= Five Finger Death Punch discography =

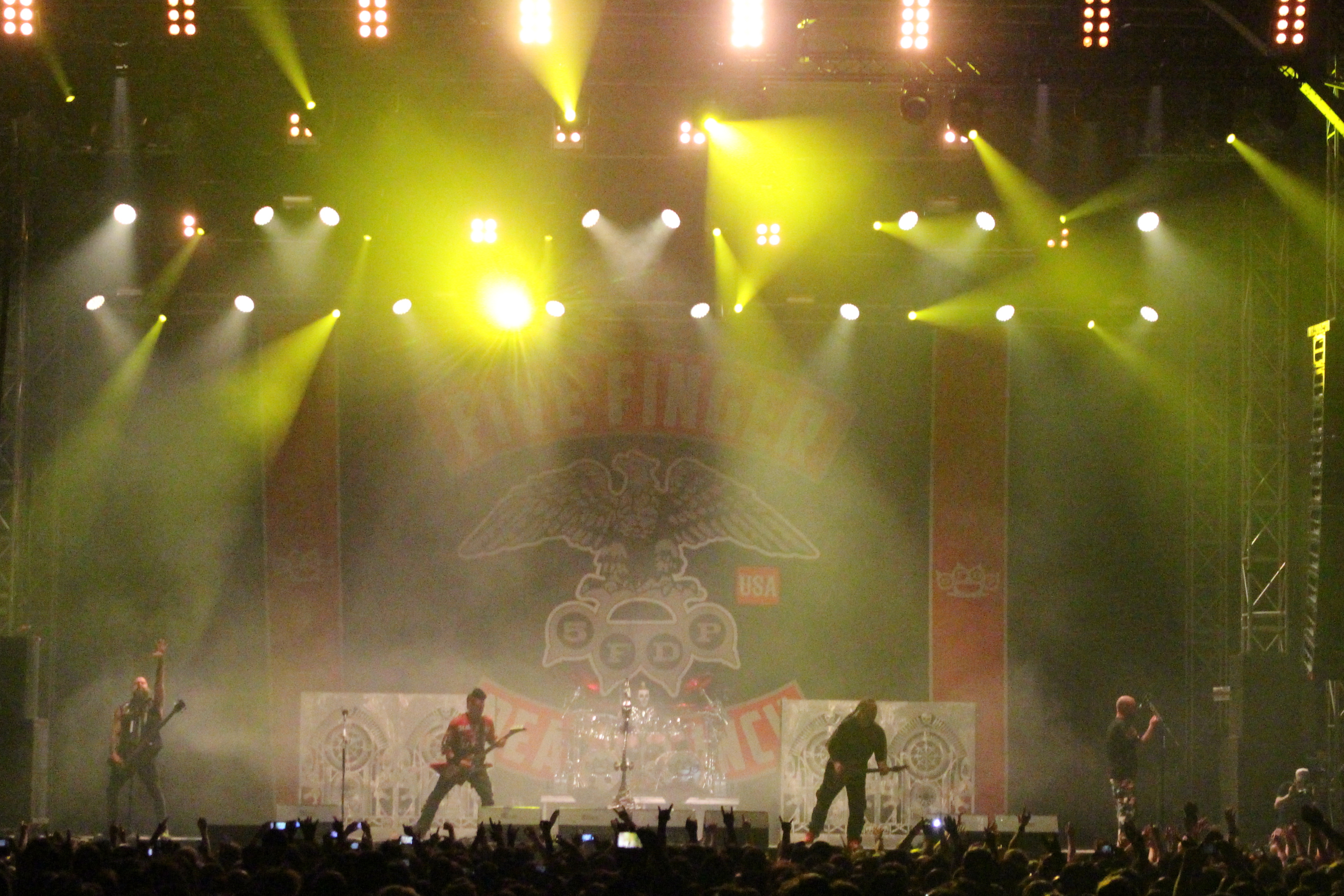
- Five Finger Death Punch performing in 2016
- Studio albums: 10
- Extended plays: 1
- Compilation albums: 2
- Singles: 38
- Music videos: 34
- Promotional singles: 7
- Re-recordings: 2

American heavy metal band Five Finger Death Punch has released ten studio albums, two compilation albums, two re-recordings, one extended play (EP), 38 singles, seven promotional singles, and 34 music videos. Formed in Las Vegas, Nevada in 2005, the group features vocalist Ivan Moody, rhythm guitarist Zoltan Bathory, lead guitarist Andy James, bassist Chris Kael. and drummer Charlie Engen. In 2007, the band released its debut album The Way of the Fist, which reached number 107 on the Billboard 200 and was certified gold by the Recording Industry Association of America (RIAA). All three singles from the album reached the top 20 of the Billboard Mainstream Rock Songs chart. After Hook replaced previous guitarist Darrell Roberts, Five Finger Death Punch released War Is the Answer in 2009 which reached the top 10 of the Billboard 200 and was certified platinum by the RIAA. Four singles from the album reached the Mainstream Rock top 10, while the band's cover of "Bad Company" was certified platinum.

In 2010, Five Finger Death Punch's original bassist Matt Snell was replaced by Kael, and the following year saw the release of the band's third album American Capitalist. It peaked at number three on the Billboard 200, reached the top 10 of the Canadian Albums Chart, and was certified platinum in the US and gold in Canada, respectively. Lead single "Under and Over It" was the band's first to register on the Billboard Hot 100, reaching number 77, while three singles from the album reached the top 10 of the Mainstream Rock chart. In 2013, the band released two studio albums – The Wrong Side of Heaven and the Righteous Side of Hell, Volume 1 and Volume 2 – both of which debuted at number two on the Billboard 200. Volume 1 was the first release by the band to reach the top five of the Canadian Albums Chart, peaking at number three, and the top 40 of the UK Albums Chart, peaking at number 21. The first single from each album – "Lift Me Up" (featuring Rob Halford) and "Battle Born" – topped the Mainstream Rock chart in the US.

Five Finger Death Punch's sixth studio album Got Your Six was released in 2015, becoming the third consecutive release by the band to debut at number two on the Billboard 200. The album was also their first to reach the top 10 of both the Australian Albums Chart and the UK Albums Chart, as well as a number of other regions. All four singles from Got Your Six reached the top five of the Mainstream Rock chart, with "Wash It All Away" becoming the band's fourth number one on the chart. Re-recorded greatest hits album Best of (Volume 1) was released on July 18, 2025.

== Studio albums ==
List of studio albums, with selected chart positions and certifications
Title	Album details	Peak chart positions										Certifications
Title	Album details	US	AUS	AUT	CAN	FIN	GER	NZ	SWE	SWI	UK	Certifications
The Way of the Fist	Released: July 31, 2007; Labels: Firm, Prospect Park; Format: CD, LP, DL, CD+DVD	107	—	—	—	28	—	—	—	—	—	RIAA: Gold; MC: Gold
War Is the Answer	Released: September 22, 2009; Label: Prospect Park; Formats: CD, LP, CD+DVD, DL	7	—	—	—	14	—	—	—	—	64	RIAA: Platinum; BPI: Silver; MC: Gold
American Capitalist	Released: October 11, 2011; Label: Prospect Park; Formats: CD, LP, DL	3	50	—	6	14	74	—	—	—	57	RIAA: Platinum; BPI: Silver; MC: Gold
The Wrong Side of Heaven and the Righteous Side of Hell, Volume 1	Released: July 30, 2013; Label: Prospect Park; Formats: CD, LP, DL	2	13	5	3	7	4	26	14	34	21	RIAA: Platinum; BPI: Gold; MC: Gold; RMNZ: Gold
The Wrong Side of Heaven and the Righteous Side of Hell, Volume 2	Released: November 19, 2013; Label: Prospect Park; Formats: CD, LP, CD+DVD, DL	2	29	17	6	—	13	—	24	81	44	RIAA: Gold; MC: Gold
Got Your Six	Released: September 4, 2015; Label: Prospect Park; Formats: CD, LP, DL	2	3	5	3	3	5	14	5	5	6	RIAA: Platinum; BPI: Silver; BVMI: Gold; MC: Gold; IFPI DAN: Gold; RMNZ: Gold
And Justice for None	Released: May 18, 2018; Label: Prospect Park; Formats: CD, LP, cassette, DL	4	4	1	4	2	1	12	4	1	7	RIAA: Gold; SWE: Gold
F8	Released: February 28, 2020; Label: Better Noise; Formats: CD, LP, cassette, DL	8	2	2	10	1	2	36	9	4	7	RIAA: Gold; MC: Gold; SWE: Gold
AfterLife	Released: August 19, 2022; Label: Better Noise; Format: CD, LP, cassette, DL	10	6	3	26	1	3	38	12	1	19	
Legacy	Released: July 31, 2026; Label: Better Noise; Format: CD, LP, cassette, DL	—	42	6	—	25	7	—	9	7	—	
"—" denotes a release that did not chart or was not issued in that region.

== Compilation albums ==
Title	Album details	Peak chart positions								Certifications
Title	Album details	US	AUS	AUT	CAN	GER	NZ Heat.	SWE	UK	Certifications
A Decade of Destruction	Released: December 1, 2017; Label: Prospect Park; Format: CD, LP, cassette, DL	29	30	52	30	36	2	45	97	BPI: Gold
A Decade of Destruction, Volume 2	Released: October 9, 2020; Label: Prospect Park; Format: CD, LP, DL	130	98	56	—	46	—	—	—	

== Re-recordings ==
- Best of (Volume 1) (2025)
- Best of (Volume 2) (2025)

== Extended play ==
List of extended plays
Title	EP details
Pre-Emptive Strike	Released: July 10, 2007; Label: Spinefarm; Format: CD

== Singles ==
=== 2000s ===
List of singles, with selected chart positions and certifications, showing year released and album name
Title	Year	Peak chart positions			Album
Title	Year	US Alt.	US Main.	US Rock	Album
"The Bleeding"	2007	—	9	—	The Way of the Fist
"Never Enough"	2008	—	9	—	The Way of the Fist
"Stranger than Fiction"	2008	—	16	—	The Way of the Fist
"Hard to See"	2009	40	8	26	War Is the Answer
"Walk Away"	2009	31	7	21	War Is the Answer
"—" denotes a release that did not chart.

=== 2010s ===
List of singles, with selected chart positions and certifications, showing year released and album name
Title	Year	Peak chart positions											Certifications	Album
Title	Year	US	US Alt.	US Hard Digi.	US Main.	US Rock	US Rock Air.	US Rock Digi.	CAN	CAN Rock	CZE Rock	FIN	Certifications	Album
"Bad Company"	2010	— (Note: "Bad Company" did not enter the Billboard Hot 100, but peaked at number 6 on the Bubbling Under Hot 100 Singles chart, which acts as an extension to the Hot 100.)	26	5	2	7	7	15	—	17	—	—	RIAA: Platinum; BPI: Silver; IFPI DAN: Gold; RMNZ: Platinum	War Is the Answer
"Far from Home"	2010	— (Note: "Far from Home" did not enter the Billboard Hot 100, but peaked at number 19 on the Bubbling Under Hot 100 Singles chart, which acts as an extension to the Hot 100.)	29	4	4	14	—	23	—	—	—	—		War Is the Answer
"Under and Over It"	2011	77	31	1	6	20	—	4	—	—	—	—		American Capitalist
"Remember Everything"	2011	— (Note: "Remember Everything" did not enter the Billboard Hot 100, but peaked at number 23 on the Bubbling Under Hot 100 Singles chart, which acts as an extension to the Hot 100.)	25	2	2	9	9	17	—	45	—	—		American Capitalist
"Coming Down"	2012	—	—	5	1	14	22	—	—	47	—	—		American Capitalist
"The Pride"	2012	—	—	21	12	—	31	—	—	—	—	—		American Capitalist
"Lift Me Up" (featuring Rob Halford)	2013	—	—	1	1	19	18	17	100	—	—	—		The Wrong Side of Heaven and the Righteous Side of Hell, Volume 1
"Battle Born"	2013	—	—	1	1	27	14	20	—	10	—	—		The Wrong Side of Heaven and the Righteous Side of Hell, Volume 2
"House of the Rising Sun"	2014	—	—	1	7	26	29	35	—	—	—	—	IFPI DAN: Gold; RMNZ: Gold	The Wrong Side of Heaven and the Righteous Side of Hell, Volume 2
"Wrong Side of Heaven"	2014	— (Note: "Wrong Side of Heaven" did not enter the Billboard Hot 100, but peaked at number 12 on the Bubbling Under Hot 100 Singles chart, which acts as an extension to the Hot 100.)	—	1	2	11	12	14	—	—	—	—	BPI: Silver; IFPI DAN: Gold; RMNZ: Platinum	The Wrong Side of Heaven and the Righteous Side of Hell, Volume 1
"Jekyll and Hyde"	2015	— (Note: "Jekyll and Hyde" did not enter the Billboard Hot 100, but peaked at number 23 on the Bubbling Under Hot 100 Singles chart, which acts as an extension to the Hot 100.)	—	1	3	12	17	8	—	—	—	—	RIAA: Platinum; BPI: Silver; RMNZ: Gold	Got Your Six
"Wash It All Away"	2015	—	—	7	1	19	15	49	—	—	4	36	RIAA: Platinum; IFPI DAN: Gold; RMNZ: Gold	Got Your Six
"My Nemesis"	2016	—	—	—	2	34	17	—	—	—	—	—		Got Your Six
"I Apologize"	2016	—	—	4	4	20	23	24	—	43	—	—		Got Your Six
"Trouble"	2017	— (Note: "Trouble" did not enter the US Billboard Hot 100, but peaked at number 35 on the US Digital Song Sales chart.)	—	1	5	10	26	4	—	—	—	32		A Decade of Destruction
"Gone Away"	2017	— (Note: "Gone Away" did not enter the US Billboard Hot 100, but peaked at number 28 on the US Digital Song Sales chart.)	—	1	2	9	18	4	—	—	16	24		A Decade of Destruction
"Fake"	2018	—	—	3	—	29	—	13	—	—	—	—		And Justice for None
"Sham Pain"	2018	—	—	2	1	14	22	10	—	38	5	—		And Justice for None
"When the Seasons Change"	2018	—	—	1	1	17	18	8	—	36	—	—		And Justice for None
"Blue on Black" (original or with Kenny Wayne Shepherd, Brantley Gilbert, and Brian May)	2018	66	—	1	1	2	9	1	—	6	—	—	RIAA: Platinum	And Justice for None
"Inside Out"	2019	— (Note: "Inside Out" did not enter the US Billboard Hot 100, but peaked at number 39 on the US Digital Song Sales chart.)	—	1	1	3	12	1	—	48	—	—	RIAA: Gold; MC: Gold	F8
"—" denotes a release that did not chart.

=== 2020s ===
List of singles, with selected chart positions and certifications, showing year released and album name
Title	Year	Peak chart positions										Certifications	Album
Title	Year	US	US Hard Digi.	US Main.	US Rock	US Rock Air.	US Rock Digi.	CAN	CAN Rock	CZE Rock	FIN	Certifications	Album
"Living the Dream"	2020	—	1	1	18	12	1	—	47	17	49		F8
"A Little Bit Off"	2020	— (Note: "A Little Bit Off" did not enter the US Billboard Hot 100, but peaked at number 43 on the US Digital Song Sales chart.)	1	1	8	3	2	—	22	—	—	RIAA: 2× Platinum; MC: Platinum	F8
"Darkness Settles In"	2021	—	9	1	25	11	17	—	35	—	81	RIAA: Gold	F8
"AfterLife"	2022	— (Note: "AfterLife" did not enter the US Billboard Hot 100, but peaked at number 43 on the US Digital Song Sales chart.)	1	1	28	8	5	— (Note: "AfterLife" did not enter the Billboard Canadian Hot 100, but peaked at number 40 on the Canadian Digital Song Sales chart.)	40	—	—		AfterLife
"Welcome to the Circus"	2022	—	1	1	35	10	3	—	49	1	—	RIAA: Gold	AfterLife
"Times Like These"	2022	—	10	1	44	11	—	—	40	—	—		AfterLife
"This Is the Way" (featuring DMX)	2024	—	1	1	47	7	8	—	—	—	—		AfterLife
"I Refuse" (2025 version) (featuring Maria Brink)	2025	—	—	1	—	15	—	—	—	—	—		Best of (Vol. 1)
"The End" (2025 version) (featuring Babymetal)	2025	—	—	1	—	16	—	—	—	—	—		Best of (Vol. 2)
"Eye of the Storm"	2026	— (Note: "Eye of the Storm" did not enter the US Billboard Hot 100, but peaked at number 8 on the US Digital Song Sales chart.)	1	1	47	11	1	—	39	—	87		Legacy
"Nails in the Coffin"	2026	—	×	2	—	20	×	—	—	—	—		Legacy
"—" denotes a release that did not chart.

=== Promotional singles ===
List of singles, with selected chart positions and certifications, showing year released and album name
Title	Year	Peak chart positions				Certifications	Album
Title	Year	US Hard Digi.	US Hard Rock	US Rock	US Rock Digi.	Certifications	Album
"Dying Breed"	2009	—	—	—	—		War Is the Answer
"No One Gets Left Behind"	2010	—	—	—	—		War Is the Answer
"Back for More"	2011	3	—	—	20		American Capitalist
"Mama Said Knock You Out" (featuring Tech N9ne)	2014	9	—	—	—		The Wrong Side of Heaven and the Righteous Side of Hell, Volume 1
"Full Circle"	2020	1	—	19	2	MC: Gold	F8
"Broken World"	2020	—	17	—	—		A Decade of Destruction, Volume 2
"Burn MF" (featuring Rob Zombie)	2023	—	12	—	—		The Wrong Side of Heaven, Volumes 1 and 2
"De Oppresso Liber"	2026	—	9	—	—		Legacy
"—" denotes a release that did not chart.

== Other charted songs ==
List of songs, with selected chart positions, showing year released and album name
Title	Year	Peaks				Album
Title	Year	US Hard Digi.	US Hard Rock	US Rock Digi.	US Rock	Album
"Anywhere But Here" (featuring Maria Brink)	2013	20	—	—	—	The Wrong Side of Heaven and the Righteous Side of Hell, Volume 1
"M.I.N.E (End This Way)"	2013	13	—	—	—	The Wrong Side of Heaven and the Righteous Side of Hell, Volume 1
"Watch You Bleed"	2013	6	—	48	—	The Wrong Side of Heaven and the Righteous Side of Hell, Volume 1
"Cold"	2013	12	—	—	—	The Wrong Side of Heaven and the Righteous Side of Hell, Volume 2
"Cradle to the Grave"	2013	23	—	—	—	The Wrong Side of Heaven and the Righteous Side of Hell, Volume 2
"War Is the Answer"	2014	25	—	—	—	War Is the Answer
"Hell to Pay"	2015	6	—	21	—	Got Your Six
"Got Your Six"	2015	4	—	28	—	Got Your Six
"Digging My Own Grave"	2015	—	—	20	—	Got Your Six
"I Refuse"	2018	10	—	—	37	And Justice for None
"To Be Alone"	2020	22	—	—	35	F8
"Bottom of the Top"	2020	—	—	—	39	F8
"Mother May I (Tic Toc)"	2020	—	—	—	48	F8
"Brighter Side of Grey"	2020	4	—	7	30	F8
"The End"	2022	—	9	—	50	AfterLife
"Judgment Day"	2022	21	9	—	—	AfterLife
"IOU"	2022	3	5	5	37	AfterLife
"Legacy"	2026	×	18	×	—	Legacy
"In Time"	2026	×	7	×	—	Legacy
"—" denotes a release that did not register or was not eligible to register on that chart.

== Music videos ==
List of music videos, showing year released and director(s) name
Title	Year	Director(s)	Ref.
"The Bleeding"	2007	Bradley Scott	
"Never Enough"	2008	Agata Alexander	
"The Way of the Fist"	2008	Sxv'Leithan Essex	
"Hard to See"	2009	Matt Silverman	
"Bad Company"	2010	Zoltan Bathory	
"Under and Over It"	2011	Ethan Emaniquis	
"Remember Everything"	2012	Emile Levisetti	
"Coming Down"	2012	Nick Peterson	
"The Pride"	2012	Ethan Emaniquis	
"Battle Born"	2013	Scott Corl	
"House of the Rising Sun"	2014	Zoltan Bathory and Brian Neal	
"Wrong Side of Heaven"	2014	Nick Peterson	
"Jekyll and Hyde"	2015	Five Finger Death Punch	
"Wash It All Away"	2015	Wayne Isham	
"My Nemesis"	2016	Nick Peterson	
"I Apologize"	2016	Nathan Cox	
"Gone Away"	2017	Nick Peterson	
"Sham Pain"	2018	Rob Anderson	
"When the Seasons Change"	2018	Nick Peterson	
"Blue on Black"	2018	Dale Resteghini	
"Blue on Black" (featuring Kenny Wayne Shepherd, Brantley Gilbert, and Brian May)	2019	Zoltan Bathory	
"Inside Out"	2019	Wombat Fire	
"A Little Bit Off"	2020	Rob Anderson	
"Living the Dream"	2020	Nick Peterson	
"Darkness Settles In"	2021	Michael Su	
"The Tragic Truth"	2022	Nick Peterson	
"Brighter Side of Grey"	2022	Nick Peterson	
"Times Like These" (first version)	2022	Shawn Brandon Media	
"Times Like These" (second version)	2022	Dale Restigini and Zoltan Bathory	
"Welcome to the Circus"	2022	Dale Restigini and Zoltan Bathory	
"Judgement Day"	2023	Nick Peterson	
"This Is the Way"	2024	Hype Williams	
"Nails in the Coffin"	2026	Shawn Brandon Media	
"Legacy"	2026	Dale Resteghini	
