= Kane Churko =

Canadian record producer (born 1986)

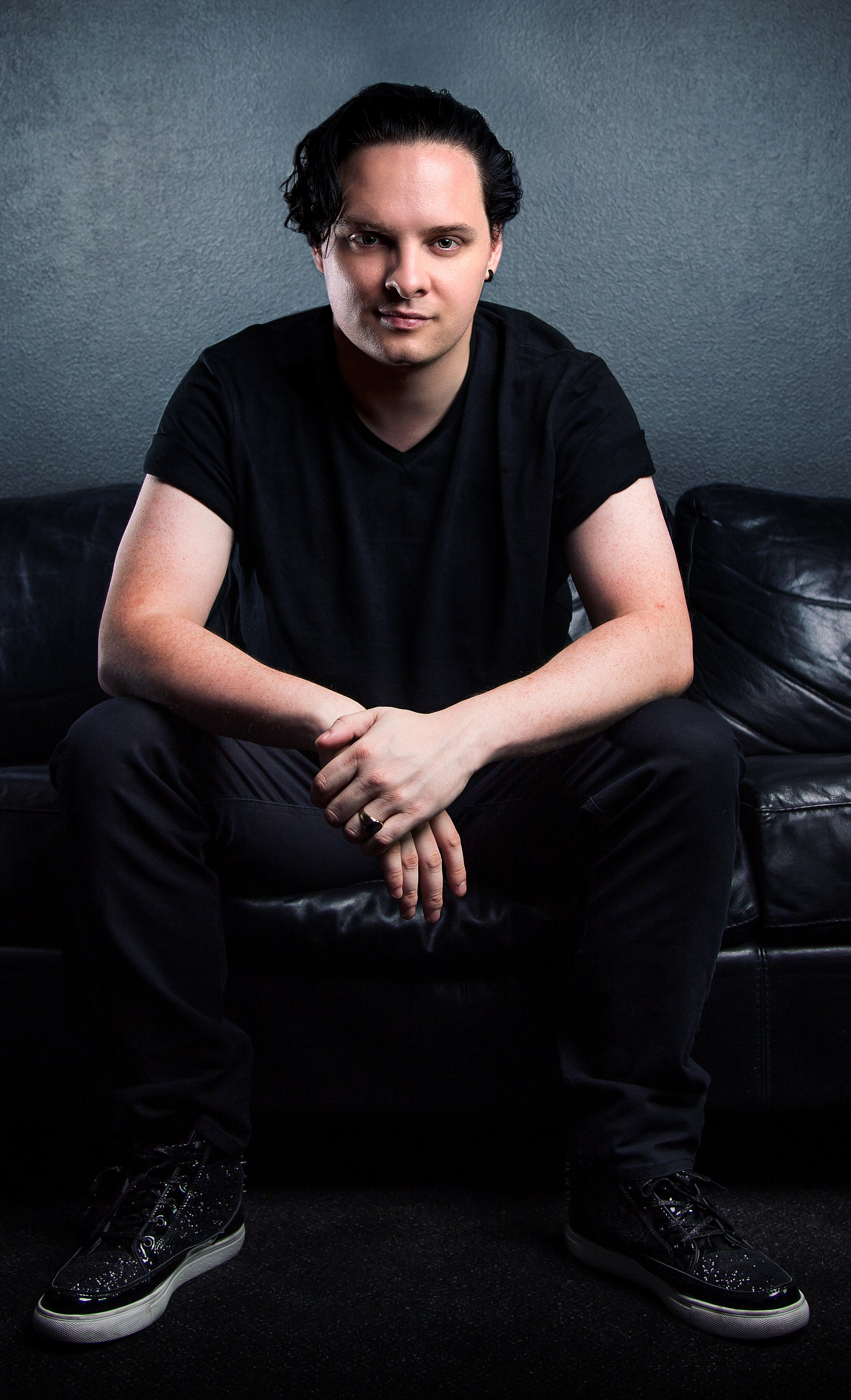
- Churko in 2017
- Born: January 20, 1986 (age 40); Regina, Saskatchewan, Canada
- Occupations: Record producer, audio engineer, songwriter, musician

Kane Gregory Churko (born January 20, 1986) is a Canadian record producer and sound engineer, best known for his work with rock and metal artists such as Ozzy Osbourne, Papa Roach, Cory Marks, Modern Science, Five Finger Death Punch, Gemini Syndrome, In This Moment, Hellyeah, and Skillet. He is the son of record producer Kevin Churko.

== Career ==
Kane Churko (son and protégé of producer Kevin Churko) is a Canadian-born, Las Vegas–based songwriter, producer, and audio engineer who has contributed to recordings by artists such as Ozzy Osbourne, Five Finger Death Punch, In This Moment, and Jake E. Lee’s Red Dragon Cartel. He works primarily out of the Hideout Recording Studio in Henderson, Nevada, and has been active in recording studios and the music industry since the age of 14.

Raised in a musical family, Churko received informal training through professional guidance from his father and through early studio experience. A multi-instrumentalist and programmer proficient with Pro Tools, he has worked with producers including Mutt Lange and Eric Valentine and has participated in projects involving artists such as Bob Dylan, Shania Twain, Maroon 5, Smash Mouth, Hinder and The Corrs.

Churko’s first co-writing credit on a released rock track appeared on Ozzy Osbourne’s eleventh studio album, Scream, which debuted at number four on the Billboard 200 and sold more than 375,000 copies. He later co-wrote with Five Finger Death Punch for their 2011 album "American Capitalist" which peaked at number two on the Billboard Hard Rock Albums chart. The single “Remember Everything,” their first collaboration, peaked at number two on the Billboard Mainstream Rock Songs chart and sold over 325,000 copies. He also co-wrote “Blood” for In This Moment’s 2012 album of the same name; the song reached number nine on the Active Rock chart and became one of Century Media Records’ best-selling singles, with more than 275,000 copies sold.

In addition to his studio work, Churko has contributed to music-production education. In 2024, he appeared on the Nail the Mix platform to teach a mixing class focused on Papa Roach’s single “Face Everything and Rise.”

Churko has also collaborated with audio-software developers on commercial production tools. He partnered with STL Tones to create the “Kane + Kevin Churko ControlHub Expansion Pack,” featuring a collection of his mix settings and signal-chain configurations. In addition, he contributed preset content for Drumforge’s Kickforge virtual instrument.

== Awards and achievements ==
In 2013 Churko became the youngest recipient of the Juno Award for "Engineer of the Year" for his work on In This Moment's "Blood" and Five Finger Death Punch's "Coming Down". He shared the award, as well as a producer nomination, with his father, who that year set a record with his fourth win in the engineering category. In 2015, Churko co-wrote, produced, engineered, and mixed “Face Everything and Rise” by Papa Roach, his first number-one song on the Active Rock chart. He has been the frontman and songwriter for the Juno-nominated pop/funk band Modern Science since 2007 and has released solo material under the name Mr. Kane since the early 2000s. He has also co-written and co-produced tracks for rapper MattyB, whose videos for those songs each reached more than five million views on YouTube. Churko’s remix and production work has included projects for Five Finger Death Punch, In This Moment, Rob Zombie, and Tech N9ne.

== Credits ==
- Cory Marks - Sorry for Nothing (December 2024)
  - Co-Producer, Engineer, Songwriter
- In This Moment - Godmode (October 2023)
  - Producer, Engineer, Mixer
- Velvet Chains - Morbid Dreams (October 2022)
  - Producer, Co-Writer, Engineer, Mixer & Masterer on 3 Songs "Last Drop", "Can't Win", "Time Stood Still".
- Skillet – Dominion (January 2022)
  - Producer, Additional Producer, Songwriter, Mixer, Engineer
- Cory Marks – Who I Am (August 2020)
  - co-producer, songwriter
- In This Moment - Mother (March 2020)
  - Producer, Engineer
- Santa Cruz – Katharsis (October 2019)
  - producer, composer.
- Memphis May Fire – Broken (November 2018)
  - producer, composer.
- Vamps – Underworld (April 2017)
  - Produced, co-wrote eight songs
- Skillet – Unleashed (August 2016)
  - Co-wrote "Out of Hell" and "Undefeated"
- Gemini Syndrome – Memento Mori (August 2016)
  - Produced, engineered & mixed album and co-wrote "Eternity" and select tracks.
- 9ELECTRIC – The Damaged Ones (July 2016)
  - Co-produced, mixed, additional engineering, & mastered album and co-wrote "Toxic Angel"
- Disturbed – Immortalized (Aug 2015)
  - Engineering, Pro Tools
- Five Finger Death Punch – Got Your Six (Sept 2015)
  - Engineering, Pro Tools
- Papa Roach – F.E.A.R. (Jan 2015)
  - Producer, Co-Writer, Engineer, Mixer & Masterer On 7 Songs "Face Everything And Rise", "Love Me Till It Hurts", "Falling Apart", *"Never Have To Say Goodbye", "Devil", "Warriors", "Hope For The Hopeless". Co-Engineer, Additional Programming On The Rest Of The Album.
- In This Moment – Black Widow (Nov 2014)
  - Co-Wrote "Bloody Creature Poster Girl" &"Bones", Additional Engineering
- Art of Dying – Rise Up EP (April 2015)
  - Produced, Mixed & Engineered The Song "Everything"
- One Ok Rock – Ambitions (2017)
  - Produced, Cowrote, Mixed, Engineered Two Songs.
- Bleeker – Ep (April 2016)
  - Mixed "Highway", Background Vocals, Additional Programming & Percussion
- Escape The Fate – Hate Me (Oct 2015)
  - Co-Wrote "Breaking Me Down"
- Falling In Reverse – Tba (2016 Tba)
  - Co-Wrote One Track
- Flyleaf – Between The Stars (Sept 2014)
  - Mixed & Mastered "Set Me On Fire (Radio Mix)" & Thread (Radio Mix)
- New Years Day – Malevolence (2015)
  - Co-Wrote "Suffer"
- Otherwise – Peace At All Costs (Sept 2014)
  - Co-Wrote Two Tracks "Coming For The Throne" &"The Other Side Of The Truth"
- Grimsley Rose – Truth To Power Ep (Aug 2014)
  - Mastered
- 3Align – Elevate (July 2014)
  - Mixed & Mastered, Vocal Production, Co-Wrote "In The Beyond", "Feel Love" &"Little Bit Better"
- Hellyeah – Blood For Blood (June 2014)
  - Additional Engineering, Pro Tools
- Chiodos – Devil (April 2014)
  - Co-Wrote "Under Your Halo"
- Gus G. - I Am The Fire (March 2014)
  - Co-Wrote "Long Way Down Featuring Alexia Rodriguez From Eyes Set To Kill"
- In This Moment – Blood Live At The Orpheum DVD (Feb 2014)
  - Co-Wrote "Blood" &"Beast Within", Assistant Mixing, Pro Tools
- Jake E. Lee's Red Dragon Cartel – Red Dragon Cartel (Jan 2014)
  - Co-wrote "Big Mouth", "Feeder", "Deceived", "Slave" and "War Machine"
- Five Finger Death Punch – The Wrong Side of Heaven and the Righteous Side of Hell, Volume 2 (Nov 2013)
  - Co-wrote "A Day In My Life", additional engineering, Pro Tools, remixer, mixed and mastered live DVD audio on bonus disc.
- Gemini Syndrome – Lux (Sept 2013)
  - Additional engineering, Pro Tools
- Eyes Set to Kill – Masks (Sept 2013)
  - Co-wrote "Haze" and "Infected"
- Five Finger Death Punch – The Wrong Side of Heaven and the Righteous Side of Hell, Volume 1 (July 2013)
  - Co-wrote "M.I.N.E (End This Way)", additional engineering, Pro Tools
- Five Finger Death Punch – Purgatory (Tales from the Pit) (July 2013)
  - Mixed and mastered entire live album, co-wrote "Remember Everything"
- Butcher Babies – Goliath (2013)
  - Co-wrote two unreleased tracks
- Rob Zombie – Venomous Rat Regeneration Vendor (2013)
  - Mix assistant, assistant mastering
- Heavy Honey – Crushing Symphony (2014)
  - Mixed and mastered entire album, vocal production on select tracks, produced and engineered "Soul Selling"
- Speaking the King's – Carousel (2015)
  - Co-wrote "Choke" and "Worthless"
- Jason Hook – American Justice (2015)
  - Mixing, additional production, mastering Heavy Honey – Crushing Symphony (2014)
  - Mixed and mastered entire album, vocal production on select tracks, produced and engineered "Soul Selling"
- Billy J White – Damn Fool Thing to Do (2014)
  - Mixed, mastered
- Chris Buck Band – Buck Wild (2014)
  - Mixed and mastered "Caribbean Dream" and "Ain't No Trouble"
- In This Moment – Blood (2012)
  - Co-wrote "Blood", "You're Gonna Listen", "Beast Within", "Comanche", engineer, programming and additional production, assistant mastering, additional guitar on "Whore", remixed "Adrenalize (Mr. Kane Remix)"
- Kobra and the Lotus – Kobra and the Lotus (2012)
  - Co-wrote "Forever One", Co-producer on 4 tracks, additional engineering, Pro Tools, assistant mastering
- Conflict of Interest – Conflict of Interest EP (2012)
  - Co-wrote and co-produced "No Pain No Pleasure", Pro Tools, programming
- Arising Tide – Arising Tide EP (2012)
  - Mixed "Guns In This Town", "Fire", "Move Along", mastered entire EP
- The Dirty Hooks – Electric Grit (2012)
  - Mixed, mastered
- Five Finger Death Punch – American Capitalist (Deluxe Edition) (2011)
  - Co-wrote "Remember Everything", 2nd engineer, remixed "Under And Over It", "The Pride", "100 Ways to Hate" and "Remember Everything"
- Modern Science – How the World Ends EP (2011)
  - Producer, writer, engineer, performer, label
- Emerson Drive – Let Your Love Speak (2011)
  - Additional engineering, Pro Tools
- Hinder – All American Nightmare (2010)
  - Additional engineering, Pro Tools
- Ozzy Osbourne – Scream (2010)
  - Co-wrote "Crucify", additional engineering, Pro Tools
- In This Moment – A Star-Crossed Wasteland (2010)
  - Assistant engineer, Pro Tools
- Five Finger Death Punch – War Is the Answer (2009)
  - Assistant engineer, Pro Tools
- Modern Science – Modern Science (2009)
  - Producer, writer, engineer, performer, label
- Scott Leigh – Scott Leigh (2009)
  - Co-writer, co-producer
- Drive A – Loss of Desire (2009)
  - Pro Tools
- Simon Collins – U-Catastrophe (2008)
  - Pro Tools
- In This Moment – The Dream (2008)
  - Pro Tools
- Ozzy Osbourne – Black Rain (2008)
  - Pro Tools, acoustic guitar on "Lay Your World on Me"
- Patricia Conroy – Talking to Myself (2007)
  - Pro Tools
- Mr. Kane – Mr. Kane (2007)
  - Producer, writer, engineer, performer, label
- Bob Dylan – Modern Times (2006)
  - Additional engineering on "Thunder on the Mountain"
- JParis – Call It What You Want (2005)
  - Pro Tools
- Lorenzo – Love Shape Bruise (2005)
  - Pro Tools
- Cardinal Trait – You Already Know (2004)

== Mix assistant ==
- SHANIA TWAIN – UP CLOSE & PERSONAL DVD (2004)
- Pro Tools Engineering
- JENNA DREY – JENNARATION JUST LIKE THAT (2004)
- Pro Tools, Additional programming on Motorocycle
- THE CORRS – BORROWED HEAVEN (2004)
- Additional Pro Tools Editing
- THE F-UPS – THE F-UPS (2004)
- Pro Tools
- THE VINES – AOL SESSIONS LIVE (2004)
- Pro Tools
- MELISSA AUF DER MAUR – AUF DER MAUR (2004)
- Pro Tools
- BRAD JOHNER – FREE (2003)
- Mix Assistant & Pro Tools on Free, Different, The Farmer's Back

== Single songs ==
- Matty B – Turn Up The Track (Feb 2015)
  - Co-Producer, Co-Writer, Engineer, Mixer, Masterer
- Rob & Pure Joy – Catches Up To You (2014 Tba)
  - Co-Writer, Produce, Engineer, Mixer, Masterer
- Two Shine County – Whole Lotta Love (Aug 2014)
  - Mixed & Mastered "Whole Lotta Love"
- Cory Marquardt – Smartphone (Sept 2014)
  - Mixed & Mastered "Smartphone"
- Brad Saunders – Hey Country Girl & Here With Me (2014)
  - Mixed & Mastered "Hey Country Girl" &"Here With Me"
- Shannon Ramirez – Sugardrop
  - Mixed & Mastered "Sugardrop"
- Rev Theory – Red Light Queen (Feb 2014)
  - Mixed Song "Red Light Queen"
- Wintergarden – Breathe (Featuring Clint Lowery) (Dec 2013)
    - Mixed, Mastered
- Lorenzo – Not Ready To Say I'M Sorry Yet (2012)
  - Mixed, Masterer
- In This Moment – Blood (2012)
  - Co-Writer #1 iTunes Metal Charts, #5 iTunes Rock Charts, #9 Active Rock Radio Charts And Still Rising Video Has Over 8 Million *Views! Best Selling Single In Century Media'S History. Over 275K Singles Sold.
- Five Finger Death Punch – Remember Everything (2011/2012)
  - Co-Writer [Peaked At #2 On Active Rock Radio], Album Sold Over 500K Copies. Over 325K Singles Sold.
- Matty B – Be Right There (2012)
  - Co-Writer, Co-Producer [Over 6 Million Views On YouTube]
- Matty B – That'S The Way (2012)
  - Co-Writer, Co-Producer [Over 6 Million Views On YouTube + #9 Billboard Social 50]
- Sherry St.Germain – Gonna Getchya (2012)
  - Co-Writer, Co-Producer, Mixer, Master, Label [Featured In Degrassi]
- Heavy Honey – Soul Selling (2012)
  - Producer, Engineer, Mixer, Master
- Nikka Bling & Modern Science – Hippie & A Thug (2010)
  - Producer, Cowriter, Engineer, Mixer, Label
- Meaghan Martin – Hate You (2010)
  - Co-Producer, Co-Writer, Label
- Modern Science Feat. Del The Funky Homosapien – Do It Right Now (2010)
  - Producer, Writer, Engineer, Performer, Label
- Modern Science – Someday (2010)
  - Producer, Writer, Engineer, Performer, Label
- Modern Science – Shake Your Money Maker (2010)
  - Producer, Writer, Engineer, Performer, Label
- Modern Science – Funky Xmas (2009)
  - Producer, Writer, Engineer, Performer, Label
- Nikka Bling – Believe Me I Know (2009)
  - Producer, Engineer, Mixer
- Juliet Simms – Say [Unreleased Demo] (2006)
  - Co-Writer, Producer
- Maroon 5 – Until You'Re Over Me (Unreleased Eric Valentine Produced B-Side) (2006)
  - Assistant Engineer, Pro Tools
- Smash Mouth – Getting Better From The Cat In The Hat Ost (2004)
  - Assistant Engineer, Pro Tools

== Remixes ==
- In This Moment – Sick Like Me (Mr. Kane & Nikka Bling Remix) (2015)
- Five Finger Death Punch – House Of The Rising Sun (Mr.Kane & Nikka Bling Remix) (Tba 2014)
- Five Finger Death Punch – Burn Mf (Mr.Kane & Nikka Bling Remix) (Tba 2014)
- Five Finger Death Punch – You (Mr.Kane & Nikka Bling Remix) (Tba 2014)
- Five Finger Death Punch – Mama Said Knock You Out (Mr.Kane & Nikka Bling Remix) (Tba 2014)
- Noah Silver – Poolhall (Mr. Kane Remix) (2013)
- For King And Country – Proof Of Your Love (Mr. Kane Remix) (2013 Unreleased)
- In This Moment – Adrenalize (Mr. Kane Remix) (2013)
- Mattyb – That'S The Way (Dubstep Remix) (2012) [Over 600K Views On YouTube]
- Five Finger Death Punch – Remember Everything (Mr.Kane & The Wolfe Remix) (2011)
- Five Finger Death Punch – The Pride (Mr.Kane & The Wolfe Remix) (2011)
- Five Finger Death Punch – 100 Ways To Hate (Mr.Kane & The Wolfe Remix) (2011)
- Five Finger Death Punch – Under And Over It (Mr.Kane & The Wolfe Remix) (2011)
- Noah Silver – Glory, Oh So Sweet&Retro Girl (Modern Science Remix) (2010)
- Snoop Dogg Feat. Kid Cudi – That Tree (Modern Science Remix) (2010)
- Weezer – Love Is The Answer (Modern Science Remix) (2010)
