= Back for More (Five Finger Death Punch song) =

Single by Five Finger Death Punch

from the album American Capitalist
- Released: September 13, 2011
- Genre: Groove metal; alternative metal
- Length: 3:22
- Label: Prospect Park
- Songwriters: Zoltan Bathory; Kevin Churko; Ivan Moody; Jason Hook; Jeremy Spencer
- Producer: Kevin Churko

Five Finger Death Punch singles chronology
"Under and Over It" (2011)	"Back for More" (2011)	"Remember Everything" (2011)

Lyric video
- "Back for More" on YouTube

"Back for More" is a song by American heavy metal band Five Finger Death Punch. It was released as the second single from their third album, American Capitalist. In October 2011, the song ranked third on the Billboard Hard Rock Digital Songs chart and 20th on the Billboard Rock Digital Songs chart.

The song is included on the soundtrack for the video game Madden NFL 12.

== Track listing ==
No.	Title	Length
1.	"Back for More"	3:22

== Personnel ==
- Zoltan Bathory – guitars
- Jason Hook – guitars, backing vocals
- Ivan Moody – vocals
- Chris Kael – bass, backing vocals (credited but did not perform)
- Jeremy Spencer – drums
