= The Pride (Five Finger Death Punch song) =

Single by Five Finger Death Punch

from the album American Capitalist
- Released: October 16, 2012
- Genre: Groove metal; rap rock
- Length: 3:23
- Label: Prospect Park
- Songwriters: Zoltan Bathory; Kevin Churko; Ivan Moody; Jason Hook; Jeremy Spencer
- Producer: Kevin Churko

Five Finger Death Punch singles chronology
"Coming Down" (2012)	"The Pride" (2012)	"Lift Me Up" (2013)

Music video
- "The Pride" on YouTube

"The Pride" is a song by American heavy metal band Five Finger Death Punch. It is the third track from their third album American Capitalist, the fifth single from the album, and is the fourteenth single overall from the band.

== Background ==
The people, brands and organisations listed in the song all relate to capitalism or the culture of the United States. In an interview, guitarist Zoltan Bathory clarified the meaning of the song. "You can be a zebra or join the lion pride. You have to rebel against your circumstances, laziness, and mediocrity—not the system."

== Music video ==
The music video was uploaded to the band's Vevo channel on YouTube on October 8, 2012. The video features clips of the band backstage and performing the song live on the American Capitalist Tour.

== Track listing ==
CD single
No.	Title	Length
1.	"The Pride"	3:24

== Personnel ==
- Zoltan Bathory – rhythm guitar
- Jason Hook – lead guitar, backing vocals
- Ivan Moody – lead vocals
- Chris Kael – bass, backing vocals (credited but did not perform)
- Jeremy Spencer – drums

== Charts ==
Chart (2013)	Peak position
US Rock & Alternative Airplay (Billboard)	31
