= Safety Dunce =

Studio album by Jason Hook
- Released: 2007
- Genre: Heavy metal; hard rock

Safety Dunce is an instrumental metal and hard rock solo album released by former Five Finger Death Punch guitarist Jason Hook in 2007. The album title is an obvious play on words of the song "The Safety Dance" by Men Without Hats. Safety Dunce won a 2007 L.A. Music Award for Best Instrumental Record.

The album's percussion was provided by former Five Finger Death Punch drummer Jeremy Spencer who also co-produced the album with Hook.

== Track listing ==
There is a six-song version and a nine-song version.

6-song version

1. Body Bag
2. Number Three
3. Slow Motion Walter
4. Beaucoup Movement
5. Safety Dunce
6. Limited Audience

9-song version

1. Body Bag
2. Number Three
3. Love Flap Candy Corn
4. Beaucoup Movement
5. Limited Audience
6. Slow Motion Walter
7. Wider Audience
8. Safety Dunce
9. Patience Tester
