= Remember Everything =

Single by Five Finger Death Punch

from the album American Capitalist
- Released: November 2011
- Studio: The Hideout (Las Vegas)
- Length: 4:38
- Label: Prospect Park
- Songwriters: Zoltan Bathory; Kevin Churko; Kane Churko; Ivan Moody; Jason Hook; Jeremy Spencer
- Producer: Kevin Churko

Five Finger Death Punch singles chronology
"Back for More" (2011)	"Remember Everything" (2011)	"Coming Down" (2012)

Music video
- "Remember Everything" on YouTube

"Remember Everything" is a song by American heavy metal band Five Finger Death Punch. It was released as the third single from their third studio album, American Capitalist (2011). The song peaked at No. 2 on Billboard's Mainstream Rock chart, at No. 10 on Billboard's Rock Songs chart and at No. 25 on Billboard's Alternative Songs chart.

== Music video ==
The music video, directed by Emile Levisetti, begins with a young child in white clothing drawing on a white floor surrounded by white walls. He begins drawing what he remembers in his life, including his home, parents, and events. It is hinted that he's abused and his father is an alcoholic. He continues drawing his memories as he grows. He gets married, joins the military, and returns to a less than perfect life. In the white room, he is shown having fits of rage and angst throughout the video. Eventually, he grows old and passes away in a hospital. Just as he dies, he drops a fifty cent coin (shown previously hanging from his carseat as an infant) and a janitor pockets it. He is then shown entering the white room (presumably heaven) as a child again.

The members of Five Finger Death Punch are not seen performing the song, although they are spotted in the video.

== Track listing ==
All tracks are written by Ivan Moody, Zoltan Bathory, Jason Hook, Jeremy Spencer and Kevin Churko.

No.	Title	Length
1.	"Remember Everything"	4:38
2.	"The Tragic Truth"	3:55

Promo CD
No.	Title	Length
1.	"Remember Everything"	4:38

== Personnel ==
Five Finger Death Punch

- Ivan Moody – vocals
- Zoltan Bathory – guitars
- Jason Hook – guitars
- Chris Kael – bass (credited but did not perform)
- Jeremy Spencer – drums

Additional personnel

- Kevin Churko – bass

== Charts ==
=== Weekly charts ===
Weekly chart performance for "Remember Everything"
Chart (2012)	Peak position
Canada Rock (Billboard)	45
US Bubbling Under Hot 100 (Billboard)	23
US Hot Rock & Alternative Songs (Billboard)	9

=== Year-end charts ===
Year-end chart performance for "Remember Everything"
Chart (2012)	Position
US Hot Rock Songs (Billboard)	36
