= Under and Over It =

Single by Five Finger Death Punch

from the album American Capitalist
- Released: July 27, 2011
- Genre: Groove metal
- Length: 3:38
- Label: Prospect Park
- Songwriters: Zoltan Bathory; Kevin Churko; Ivan Moody; Jason Hook; Jeremy Spencer
- Producer: Kevin Churko

Five Finger Death Punch singles chronology
"Far from Home" (2010)	"Under and Over It" (2011)	"Back for More" (2011)

Music video
- "Under and Over It" on YouTube

"Under and Over It" (initialized as "UAOI") is a song by American heavy metal band Five Finger Death Punch. It was released as the first single from their third album American Capitalist, and their tenth single overall. The song was released on July 27, 2011, and from July–November 2011, it was ranked as the number one song on SiriusXM's Octane (hard rock) channel's weekly countdown. "Under and Over It" reached number 77 on the Billboard Hot 100, and was their only entry on the chart until "Blue on Black" reached number 66.

== Background ==
According to lead vocalist Ivan Moody, the song was inspired by rumors that he found on the internet. The rumors purported that Moody committed suicide, that his band broke up, and that he was a drug addict with fourteen children. At the band's August 27, 2011 Pain in the Grass concert in Emerald City, Washington, Moody pointed out that he was alive, his band was still together, and stated that "the kid part might be true, I'm waiting on blood tests, but the only drug I do is green".

== Music video ==
The video begins with an illusion of the band performing in a studio in front of a marquee of flashing lights, then zooms in to the band. The video director steps in, interrupts the song and tells the band that "I need more attitude, more feeling". Moody slaps the director, and the band plays the song again.

While the band plays the introduction, Moody counts to four on his fingers, followed by Zoltan Bathory and he then driving up to a house in a black supercar. The video shifts between Moody in a studio, a bar, and a pool party at Gavin Maloof's mansion in Las Vegas, the same location as Lil Wayne's "Lollipop" video. When the lyric, "Did you hear about the money, how it made me change" came on, a briefcase with the name "GUVERA" showing is opened, with Bathory signing a contract and fistbumping Moody. Then in the bar scene, a man breaks open a piñata full of money. A picture of an article from The Las Vegas Post reading:

"1.2 MILLION IN DAMAGE!

Rock stars in DRUNKEN RAMPAGE!

TRASHED!"

then appears on the screen.

The scene then switches to Ivan driving a classic antique car with Jeremy Spencer, Jason Hook and a bikini clad women. In the pool scene, Chris Kael pushes the video director into the pool while a bikini clad woman in the front seat of the car bends over to give Moody a blow job.

Another picture of a Las Vegas Post article reading:

"SMASHED!

BAND DEMOLISHES 300K SPORTS CAR, WALKS AWAY UNSCATHED.

OUT ON BAIL!"

then rotates into view. Moody and the woman switch places, and Moody goes down on the woman while she is driving.

The five band members then enter a business jet with a Five Finger Death Punch American Capitalist logo similar to that of the seal of the president of the United States. The video director photographs the pilot after he becomes intoxicated, and has artwork drawn all over his face. Moody, Bathory and two women then take over the cockpit controls. The video director is shown to be warning Moody and Bathory to watch out in front of them. He then jumps for cover prior to the plane crashing into a mountain. The video ends with Moody and Bathory falling from the plane on parachutes, and then followed by the last scene from the studio with the band packing away instruments and leaving.

== Track listing ==
Promo CD
No.	Title	Length
1.	"Under and Over It (explicit)"	3:38
2.	"Under and Over It (clean)"	3:38

Promo CD and DVD
No.	Title	Length
1.	"Under and Over It" (on CD)	3:38
2.	"Under and Over It (music video)" (on DVD)

"Under and Over It" re-print remixes
No.	Title	Length
1.	"Under and Over It (Kraddy remix)"
2.	"Under and Over It (Kill the Noise remix)"
3.	"Under and Over It (Kill the Noise remix) (with lyrics)"
4.	"Under and Over It (Mr. Kane and the Wolfe remix)"
5.	"Under and Over It (clean single version)"

== Charts ==
Chart (2011)	Peak position
US Billboard Hot 100	77
US Hot Rock & Alternative Songs (Billboard)	20

== Personnel ==
- Zoltan Bathory – rhythm guitar
- Jason Hook – lead guitar, backing vocals (original version)
- Ivan Moody – vocals
- Chris Kael – bass, backing vocals (credited but did not perform on original version but performs on re-recorded version)
- Jeremy Spencer – drums (original version)
- Andy James - guitars (re-recorded version)
- Charlie Engen - drums (re-recorded version)
