= Coming Down (Five Finger Death Punch song) =

Single by Five Finger Death Punch

from the album American Capitalist
- Released: April 24, 2012
- Length: 4:01
- Label: Prospect Park
- Songwriters: Ivan Moody; Zoltan Bathory; Jason Hook; Jeremy Spencer; Kevin Churko
- Producer: Kevin Churko

Five Finger Death Punch singles chronology
"Remember Everything" (2011)	"Coming Down" (2012)	"The Pride" (2012)

Music video
- "Coming Down" on YouTube

"Coming Down" is a song by American heavy metal band Five Finger Death Punch. The song was released as the fourth single from their third album, American Capitalist, and their thirteenth single overall. On the week of September 1, the song ranked first on the Billboard Hot Mainstream Rock Tracks chart (their first-ever number one single) and fourteenth on the Billboard Rock Songs chart. The music video premiered on Vevo on June 12, 2012. The song won a 2012 RadioContraband Rock Radio Award for Song of the Year.

== Premise ==
This video was created by Five Finger Death Punch in an effort to prevent suicide among youth.

== Music video ==
The video, directed by Nick Peterson, begins with clips of a young woman (played by Samantha Gill) in a bathroom placing an envelope, a pill bottle and a make-up brush on the counter. Meanwhile, a young man (played by Leland Montgomery) walks out to a kitchen with a revolver in hand where an older man and woman (presumably his parents) are seated having breakfast together. The young man cocks the hammer, then puts the revolver barrel to his head and (presumably) pulls the trigger to commit suicide as his parents try to stop him. After a single gunshot is heard, the song begins playing.

The young woman is shown vomiting on her mirror, implying she attempted suicide by overdosing on pills. The video then flashes back to the events that caused the two young people to attempt suicide. The man argues with his parents and is physically bullied by a gang, causing suicidal signs such as giving away possessions while the woman is sexually abused, cyberbullied and self-harms as a result.

At the end of the video, the two young adults survive the suicide attempts and thank their parents and friends, and discard their suicide notes.

The screen then fades to black, with a message from the band encouraging viewers to call the National Suicide Prevention Lifeline if they’re suffering from suicidal ideation.

== Personnel ==
- Zoltan Bathory – rhythm guitar
- Jason Hook – lead guitar, backing vocals (original version)
- Ivan Moody – lead vocals
- Chris Kael – bass guitar, backing vocals (credited but did not perform on original version, performs on re-recorded version)
- Jeremy Spencer – drums (original version)
- Andy James - guitars (re-recorded version)
- Charlie Engen - drums (re-recorded version)

== Charts ==
=== Weekly charts ===
Chart (2012)	Peak position
Canada Rock (Billboard)	47
US Hot Rock & Alternative Songs (Billboard)	14

=== Year-end charts ===
Chart (2012)	Position
US Hot Rock & Alternative Songs (Billboard)	44
