= Legacy (Five Finger Death Punch album) =

Studio album by Five Finger Death Punch
- Released: July 31, 2026
- Length: 36:43
- Label: Better Noise
- Producer: Drew Fulk

Five Finger Death Punch chronology
AfterLife (2022)	Legacy (2026)

Singles from Legacy
- 1. "Eye of the Storm" Released: May 15, 2026; 2. "De Oppresso Liber" Released: June 26, 2026; 3. "Nails in the Coffin" Released: July 31, 2026

Professional ratings
Review scores
Source	Rating
Blabbermouth.net	9/10

Legacy is the tenth studio album by American heavy metal band Five Finger Death Punch, released digitally on July 31, 2026, exactly 19 years after their first studio album, The Way of the Fist. It was released on CD on September 18, 2026. It is the band's first album since The Way of the Fist to not be produced by Kevin Churko. With a runtime of 36:43, it is the shortest Five Finger Death Punch album to date. The album was preceded by the singles "Eye of the Storm" and "De Oppresso Liber". The album cover, along with the cover of both promotional singles was made with generative artificial intelligence. The music video for "De Oppresso Liber" was made with generative artificial intelligence as well.

== Background ==
Guitarist Zoltan Bathory stated that the album is a "reflection on the journey, the lessons, the victories, the struggles, and everything we've experienced over the last two decades."

The lead single, "Eye of the Storm", was released on May 15, 2026. The second single "De Oppresso Liber" was released on June 26, 2026. Bathory stated, "[the song] represents a willingness to stand between danger and those who cannot defend themselves." On the same day, the band released a music video for the albums third single, "Nails in the Coffin".

== Track listing ==
All music is composed by Ivan Moody, Zoltan Bathory & Andy James [unless specified].

No.	Title	Music	Length
1.	"Legacy"	Moody, Bathory, James, Drew Fulk	3:30
2.	"De Oppresso Liber"		4:00
3.	"Eye of the Storm"	Moody, Bathory, Fulk, James	3:15
4.	"Nails in the Coffin"	Moody, Bathory, Fulk, James	4:09
5.	"In Time"		4:01
6.	"Unscathed"	Moody, Bathory, Fulk, James	3:56
7.	"Joke's on Me"		3:32
8.	"Everybody Lies"	Moody, Bathory, Fulk, James	3:20
9.	"Shelter"		3:45
10.	"Scapegoat"	Moody, Bathory, Fulk, James	3:15
Total length:			36:43

== Charts ==
Chart performance for Legacy
Chart (2026)	Peak position
Australian Albums (ARIA)	42
Austrian Albums (Ö3 Austria)	6
Belgian Albums (Ultratop Flanders)	65
Belgian Albums (Ultratop Wallonia)	158
Finnish Albums (Suomen virallinen lista)	25
French Physical Albums (SNEP)	49
French Rock & Metal Albums (SNEP)	28
German Albums (Offizielle Top 100)	7
German Rock & Metal Albums (Offizielle Top 100)	3
Hungarian Physical Albums (MAHASZ)	39
Japanese Download Albums (Billboard Japan)	75
Japanese Western Albums (Oricon)	27
Scottish Albums (Official Charts)	16
Swedish Albums (Sverigetopplistan)	9
Swedish Hard Rock Albums (Sverigetopplistan)	2
Swiss Albums (Schweizer Hitparade)	7
UK Albums Sales (Official Charts)	20
UK Independent Albums (Official Charts)	12
UK Rock & Metal Albums (Official Charts)	2
US Independent Albums (Billboard)	37
US Top Album Sales (Billboard)	18
US Top Hard Rock Albums (Billboard)	20
