= Modern Science (band) =

American pop/rock band

- Origin: Las Vegas, Nevada, U.S.
- Genres: Alternative rock; synthpop; funk; party rock; pop
- Years active: 2007–present
- Label: MIMORTL
- Members: Kane Churko (vocals); Mike McHugh (bass); Live members: Nikka Bling; Kevin Churko; Michael Spadoni; Charles Henry
- Website: modernsciencemusic.com

Modern Science is an American pop/rock band from Las Vegas founded by Kane Churko and Mike McHugh with funk, electro, hip hop and R&B influences. Canadian songwriter/producer Kane Churko is the front man and lead singer for the band and primary writer and producer of all of Modern Science's music. Kane is the son of producer Kevin Churko who is also a frequent co-producer of the band's material.

Kevin Churko is also known to play drums on occasion for Modern Science at their rare live shows as well as on most of their recorded material. The band is known for their improvisational live shows that often include special guests from other entertainers that they work with.

In January 2010, while opening two nights at the Hard Rock Cafe for Simon Collins, the band announced that they would release one free song every month leading up to their second album and that it would feature a lot more hip hop elements as well as collaborators such as Del the Funky Homosapien and Reallionaire Jream. This follows in line with their history of releasing their self-titled debut album on their own independent record label MIMORTL Records for free online as well.

The pair put on a critically acclaimed performance at CMJ Music Marathon 2010 in October 2009 in New York City along with frequent live band members Charles Henry, Michael Spadoni, Nick Helbling & Kevin Churko.

Kane Churko and Mike McHugh are currently listed as celebrity judges for national Battle of the Band's contest "A Fight for Fame".

== Albums ==
=== Modern Science a.k.a. "The Free Album" (March 2009) ===
Following their two singles "Every Little Thing" and "Look Where You're Walking", Modern Science was released in 2009 on iTunes as well as for free on the band's website. Their track "Look Where You're Walking was nominated for Jack Richardson Producer Of The Year at the 2010 Canadian Juno Awards for Kevin Churko & Kane Churko's work on the album. "Look Where You're Walking" has also nominated in the Top40/Pop category for the 2009 International Songwriting Competition judged by Robbie Williams, Rob Thomas, Timbaland and more.

== Singles ==
=== "Funky Xmas" (December 2009) ===
Modern Science recorded an original Christmas song called Funky Xmas. The song was available for a limited time as a free download, but the band has pulled it from their website as of June 2009.

=== "Shake Your Money Maker" (January 2009) ===
Modern Science released "Shake Your Money Maker" on iTunes in January 2009. It is the first cover recorded by Modern Science and was originally written by Elmore James. The song was commissioned by Coinstar for a contest that eventually was canceled. The band decided to release the song anyway.

=== "Do It Right Now" featuring Del the Funky Homosapien (March 2010) ===
In March 2010 the duo released a free download on their website of a new song called "Do It Right Now" that Kane Churko wrote with Del the Funky Homosapien.

=== "Someday" (April 2010) ===
The band released their fourth single of 2010 "Someday" in April on their website. The song was written and produced by Kane Churko & Kevin Churko and was originally written as a possible UK single for the Jonas Brothers. The Jonas Brothers never used the song in the end so Modern Science recorded it for their album.

=== "Hippie & a Thug" featuring Nikka Bling (May 2010) ===
In April 2010 Modern Science collaborated with Nikka Bling for "Hippie & A Thug." The song was written with Nicholas Helbling and produced by Kane Churko.

== Remixes ==
=== "Tall Boy" by Har Mar Superstar featuring Kane (Modern Science remix) ===
In December 2009 Modern Science released a remix they did for Har Mar Superstar as part of a contest on Indabamusic. The band's remix made it to the top ten out of over 200 remixes.

=== "Love Is the Answer" by Weezer featuring Kane (Modern Science remix) ===
In March 2010 Mix94.1 FM in Las Vegas announced the release of the band's second remix.

=== "That Tree" by Snoop Dogg & Kid Cudi featuring Kane (Modern Science remix) ===
In April 2010, Kane Churko released the band's latest remix for Snoop Dogg on his personal website.

=== "Glory" by Noah Silver featuring Kane (Modern Science remix) ===
In May 2010 the band released a remix for independent artist Noah Silver.

== Music videos ==
- "Every Little Thing" directed by Brandon Christensen
