= American Capitalist =

Studio album by Five Finger Death Punch
- Released: October 11, 2011
- Recorded: 2010–2011 at The Hideout studios, Las Vegas, Nevada
- Genres: Groove metal; alternative metal; hard rock
- Length: 40:13
- Label: Prospect Park
- Producers: Kevin Churko; Five Finger Death Punch

Five Finger Death Punch chronology
War Is the Answer (2009)	American Capitalist (2011)	The Wrong Side of Heaven and the Righteous Side of Hell, Volume 1 (2013)

Singles from American Capitalist
- 1. "Under and Over It" Released: July 27, 2011; 2. "Back for More" Released: September 13, 2011; 3. "Remember Everything" Released: November 2011; 4. "Coming Down" Released: April 24, 2012; 5. "The Pride" Released: October 16, 2012; 6. "The Tragic Truth" Released: January 7, 2022

American Capitalist is the third studio album by American heavy metal band Five Finger Death Punch, released on October 11, 2011. It is the band's first album not to feature bassist Matt Snell, as he departed from the band in December 2010. The first single from the album entitled "Under and Over It", was released on July 27, 2011. The album debuted at number three on the Billboard 200 and sold more than 90,000 copies in the first week of release. In September 2012, the album was certified gold by the RIAA with sales of at least 500,000 copies. In 2012, the album won a RadioContraband Rock Radio Award for Album of the Year, and the single "Coming Down" won the award for Song of the Year. As of 2017, the album was certified platinum by the Recording Industry Association of America (RIAA) with sales of at least 1,000,000 copies.

== Singles ==
Five singles have been released from the album, "Under and Over It", "Back for More", "Remember Everything", "Coming Down", and "The Pride".

=== "Under and Over It" ===
After its release as a single, "Under and Over It" enjoyed significant success. Its highest charted position on Billboard's Hot Mainstream Rock Tracks chart was fifth; it reached 20th on the U.S. Rock Songs chart; and even appeared on the Billboard Hot 100. From July through November of 2011, the song was also the number one song on Sirius XM radio's Octane channel.

=== "The Pride" ===
"The Pride" is the third track on the album, and is often considered a list song. In an interview, guitarist Zoltan Bathory clarified the meaning of the song. "You can be a zebra or join the lion pride. You have to rebel against your circumstances, laziness and mediocrity—not the system."

=== "The Tragic Truth" ===
The song "The Tragic Truth" never made the standard edition of American Capitalist. According to an interview with Zoltan, "The Tragic Truth" was originally going to be on the album, but it wasn't mixed in time. "The Tragic Truth" then ended up on the iTunes edition of the album.

== Critical reception ==
Professional ratings
Review scores
Source	Rating
About.com	4/5 stars
AllMusic	3.5/5 stars
Artistdirect	5/5 stars
Billboard	4/5 stars
Kerrang!	4/5 stars
Loudwire	4/5 stars
PopMatters	5/10
Rock Sound	8/10

Terry Bezer of Rock Sound said that "American Capitalist announces them as the world champions at post-Black album piledriving riffs and soaring, US radio-friendly melodies. To knock it for being dumb would be to miss the point entirely." Amy Sciarretto from Loudwire commended the band for approaching the nu-metal formula with "solid songwriting and a genuine pissed off-ness" that has been masterly crafted throughout the album, revealing layers to the band that goes beyond "simplistic mook rock", concluding that "5FDP deliver mid-tempo, fiery, quality hard rock that should further increase their visibility." AllMusic editor Gregory Heaney praised the band's musicianship for replicating the "era of post-Pantera groove metal," highlighting the title track and "Menace" for encapsulating that sound but also gave credit to both "Coming Down" and "Remember Everything" for showcasing their ability to give ballads a more rougher edge, concluding that fans of Sevendust and Mudvayne will find interest in them through this record. PopMatters contributor Chris Colgan praised the overall consistency of the band's instrumentation and Ivan's "raw vocal prowess" being similar to their previous efforts but was critical of the lyrical content expounding messages of America and capitalism that goes against the band's penchant for "emotionally-charged lyrics about individualism, rage and darkness", concluding that "American Capitalist is just an unnecessary and irritating reminder that the American Dream is out of reach for most of us and will remain that way forever."

== Track listing ==
All tracks are written by Ivan Moody, Zoltan Bathory, Jason Hook, Jeremy Spencer and Kevin Churko, except where noted.

Standard edition, disc one of deluxe edition and 10th Anniversary Edition vinyl
No.	Title	Length
1.	"American Capitalist"	3:28
2.	"Under and Over It"	3:38
3.	"The Pride"	3:23
4.	"Coming Down"	4:01
5.	"Menace"	3:31
6.	"Generation Dead"	3:43
7.	"Back for More"	3:22
8.	"Remember Everything"	4:38
9.	"Wicked Ways"	3:07
10.	"If I Fall"	3:56
11.	"100 Ways to Hate"	3:21
Total length:		40:13

iTunes edition and 2019 vinyl re-release bonus track
No.	Title	Length
12.	"The Tragic Truth"	3:55

iTunes deluxe edition
No.	Title	Length
12.	"Under and Over It" (remix)	3:56
13.	"The Pride" (remix)	3:24
14.	"Remember Everything" (remix)	4:50
15.	"100 Ways to Hate" (remix)	3:11
16.	"The Tragic Truth"	3:55
17.	"Under and Over It" (music video)	4:04

Disc two of deluxe edition
No.	Title	Length
12.	"Under and Over It" (remix)	3:56
13.	"The Pride" (remix)	3:24
14.	"Remember Everything" (remix)	4:50
15.	"100 Ways to Hate" (remix)	3:11
Total length:		15:22

Japanese edition
No.	Title	Writer(s)	Length
12.	"A New Level" (Pantera cover)	Pantera	4:00

2016 vinyl re-issue bonus track
No.	Title	Length
12.	"The Pride" (remix)	3:24

== Personnel ==
Five Finger Death Punch

- Ivan Moody – lead vocals
- Zoltan Bathory – guitars
- Jason Hook – guitars
- Jeremy Spencer – drums
- Chris Kael – bass (credited but did not play)

Additional personnel

- Kevin Churko – production, engineering, mixing, mastering, bass
- "Mr. Kane" Churko – engineering, remixing and co-wrote "Remember Everything"

== Charts ==
=== Album ===
Chart (2011–2012)	Peak position
Canadian Albums	6
Finnish Albums Chart	14
Scottish Albums	56
UK Albums Chart	57
US Billboard 200	3
US Digital Albums	2
US Independent Albums	1
US Rock Albums	2
US Hard Rock Albums	2

Year-end charts
Chart (2011)	Position
U.S. Billboard 200	191

=== Singles ===
Year	Title	Peak chart positions			
Year	Title	US Alt.	US Main.	US Rock	Rock Airplay
2011	"Under and Over It"	31	6	20	—
2011	"Back for More"	—	—	—	—
2011	"Remember Everything"	25	2	9	—
2012	"Coming Down"	—	1	14	—
2012	"The Pride"	—	12	—	47
"—" denotes releases that did not chart or were not released in that country.

== Certifications ==
Region	Certification	Certified units/sales
Canada (Music Canada)	Gold	40,000^{^}
United Kingdom (BPI)	Silver	60,000^{‡}
United States (RIAA)	Platinum	1,000,000^{‡}
^{^} Shipments figures based on certification alone.^{‡} Sales+streaming figures based on certification alone.
