= Five Finger Death Punch =

American heavy metal band

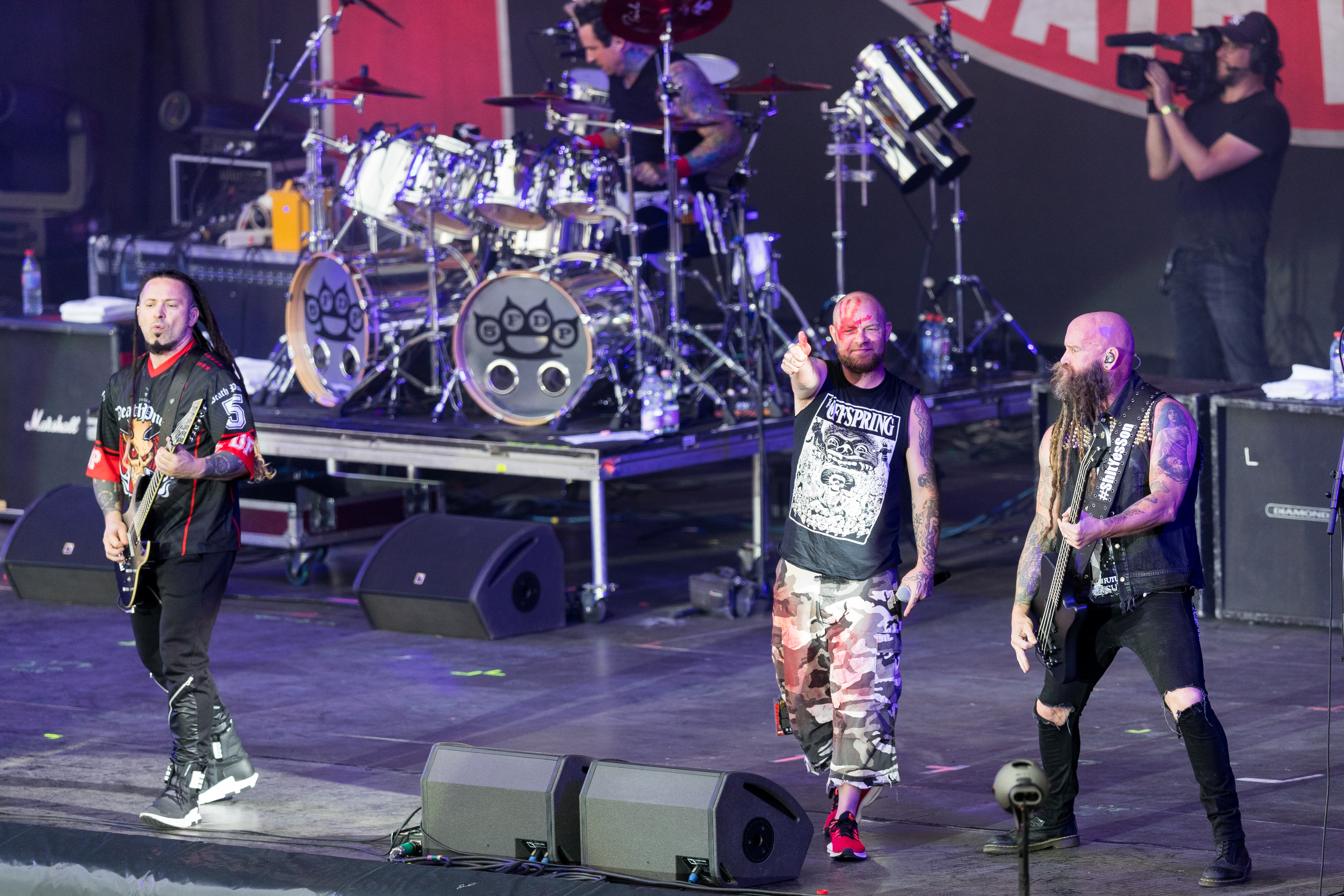
- Left to right: Bathory, Spencer, Moody, and Kael performing at 2017's Rock am Ring

Background information
- Also known as: 5FDP; FFDP; Death Punch; Five Finger
- Origin: Las Vegas, Nevada, U.S.
- Genres: Groove metal; alternative metal; hard rock
- Works: Five Finger Death Punch discography
- Years active: 2005–present
- Labels: Better Noise; Firm; EMI; Prospect Park; Spinefarm; Universal
- Members: Zoltan Bathory; Ivan Moody; Chris Kael; Charlie Engen; Andy James
- Past members: Caleb Bingham; Darrell Roberts; Matt Snell; Jeremy Spencer; Jason Hook
- Website: fivefingerdeathpunch.com

Five Finger Death Punch, also abbreviated as 5FDP or FFDP, is an American heavy metal band formed in Las Vegas, Nevada, in 2005. The band originally consisted of vocalist Ivan Moody, guitarists Zoltan Bathory and Caleb Andrew Bingham, bassist Matt Snell, and drummer Jeremy Spencer. Bingham was replaced by guitarist Darrell Roberts in 2006, who was then replaced by Jason Hook in 2009. Bassist Matt Snell departed from the band in 2010, and was replaced by Chris Kael in 2011. Spencer then departed the band in 2018 due to recurring back issues, and was replaced by Charlie Engen, making Bathory and Moody the only members to appear on every album. In October 2020, British guitarist Andy James became the band's lead guitarist, replacing Jason Hook.

Five Finger Death Punch's debut album The Way of the Fist was released in 2007, which achieved rapid success and sold over 500,000 copies in the United States. The 2009 follow-up album War Is the Answer further increased their popularity, selling over 1,000,000 copies and being certified Platinum by the RIAA, the band's third album, American Capitalist, was released on October 11, 2011, and achieved Platinum status. The following four albums—The Wrong Side of Heaven and the Righteous Side of Hell, Volume 1 (2013), The Wrong Side of Heaven and the Righteous Side of Hell, Volume 2 (2013), Got Your Six (2015), and And Justice for None (2018)—have all been certified Platinum or Gold, making Five Finger Death Punch one of the most successful heavy metal bands of the decade. The band has played international music festivals including Mayhem Festival in 2008, 2010, and 2013, and Download Festival in 2009, 2010, 2013, 2015, and 2017. The band released their eighth studio album, F8, in 2020 and their ninth album AfterLife was released in 2022. Their tenth studio album, Legacy, was released in July 2026.

Five Finger Death Punch are the recipients of the RadioContraband Rock Radio Awards for "Indie Artist of the Year" in 2011, 2012, 2013, and 2014. They were also honored with the Radio Contraband Rock Radio Award for Album (American Capitalist) and Song of the Year ("Coming Down") in 2012 and "Video of the Year" for "Wrong Side of Heaven" in 2014. As of 2025, Five Finger Death Punch has released ten studio albums, one live album, four compilation albums, one extended play (EP), and 33 singles.

In 2025, Jeff Mezydlo of Yardbarker included the band in his list of "the greatest metal acts that formed in the 2000s".

== History ==
=== Formation, The Way of the Fist and Roberts' departure (2005–2009) ===
Five Finger Death Punch was founded in 2005 by former U.P.O. bassist Zoltan Bathory and drummer Jeremy Spencer, Zoltan deriving the band's name from classic martial arts cinema. Guitarist Zoltan Bathory commented on the band's name: "The name of the band has to have some kind of effect. It doesn't have to be positive. It doesn't have to be, like, 'That's the greatest name in the world!' It can be, 'Oh my god, that's the dumbest fucking shit I ever heard!' Equally good, because it got a reaction. I mean, I don't think you can beat Five Finger Death Punch. That's probably the worst fucking name. In fact, we almost changed it, but then Ivan came in and said, 'That's the best name ever, they're gonna fucking hate it! Keep it! That's fucking ridiculous!"

Bassist Matt Snell joined in early 2006. Later that year, Bathory contacted former Motograter vocalist Ivan Moody, sending him some of the material the band had recorded and asked him to audition for the vocalist position. Moody flew from his home in Denver, Colorado to Los Angeles and quickly began recording material with the band.

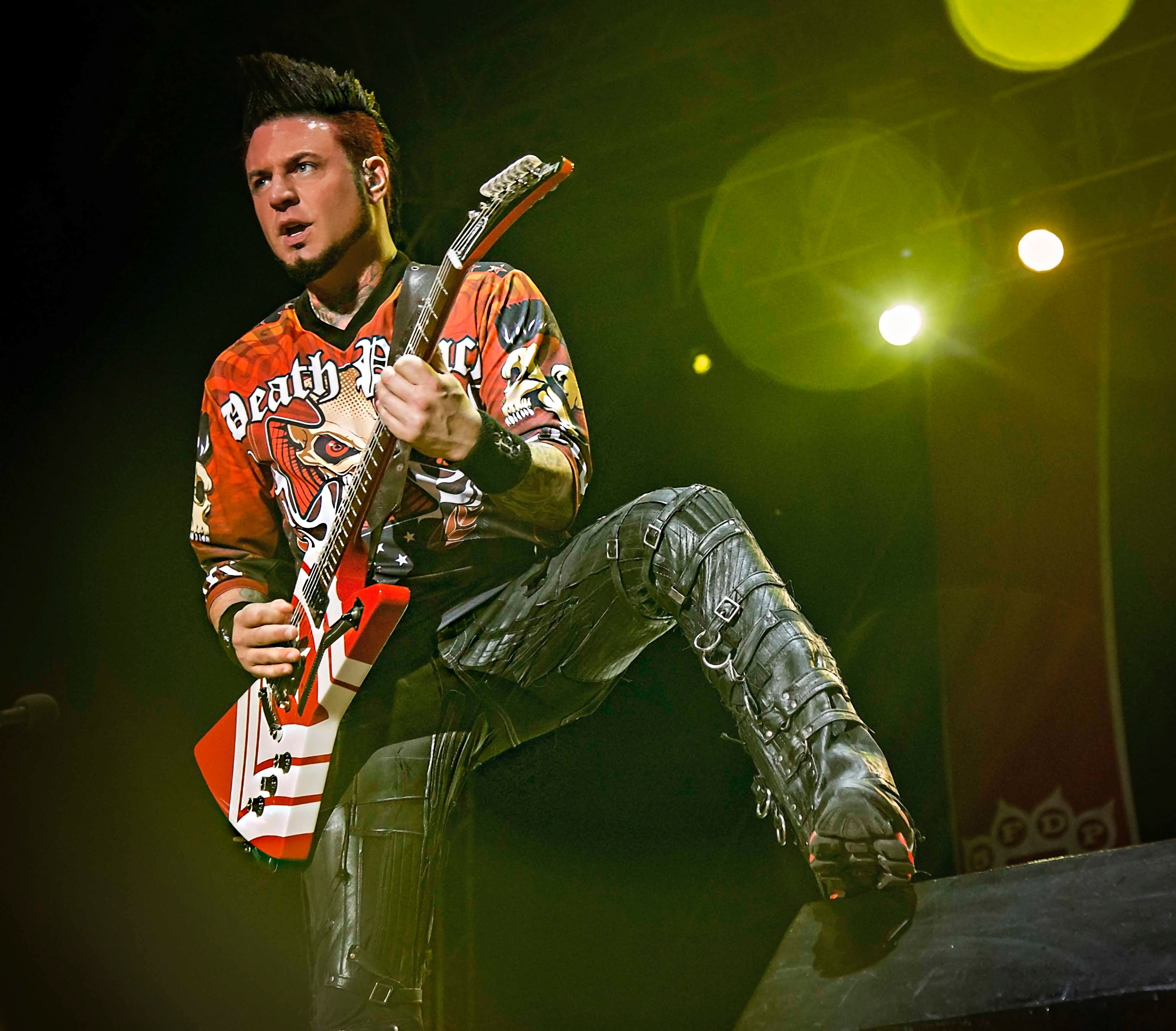
Jason Hook, who replaced guitarist Darrell Roberts in 2009

By the end of 2006, their debut album, The Way of the Fist had been recorded and entirely self-produced. The album was recorded with Stevo "Shotgun" Bruno and Mike Sarkisyan and was mixed by guitarist Logan Mader. After searching for a second guitarist, they found Caleb Bingham who played some shows with the band, but was later replaced by Darrell Roberts. Shortly after recording the album, they signed a record deal with Firm Music, a branch of "The Firm". On July 10, 2007, they released an EP, Pre-Emptive Strike exclusively through the American iTunes Store. The album's lead single, "The Bleeding", was released on July 13, 2007. The Way of the Fist was released on July 31, 2007. The album entered the Billboard 200 at number 199 and was certified gold in 2011.

From July 30 to September 2, 2007, the band went on their first major tour cycle as one of the supporting acts on Korn's Family Values Tour. They were also a supporting act of the North American leg of Korn's Bitch We Have a Problem Tour from September 22 – October 27, 2007. They were set to tour with Chimaira and All That Remains from January through March 2008, but due to singer Moody developing cysts on his vocal cords they were forced to pull out. He made a full recovery and they began to tour again. They supported Disturbed on their Indestructible US Tour from April through May 2008.

The Way of the Fist was re-released on May 13, 2008, with 3 bonus tracks. One of the bonus tracks, "Never Enough" was released as the album's second single on July 15, 2008. Later that year they were a part of the 2008 Mayhem Festival playing the Jägermeister Stage. The third single from The Way of the Fist, "Stranger Than Fiction" was released on September 17, 2008. The Way of the Fist was released through Spinefarm Records in Canada on November 4, 2008, and in Europe on January 19, 2009. In January 2009, Darrell Roberts was rumored to have been fired; the split was confirmed a few days later, and Roberts was replaced by guitarist Jason Hook. They ended their support for their first album playing the main stage at the 2009 Download Festival.

=== War Is the Answer (2009–2010) ===
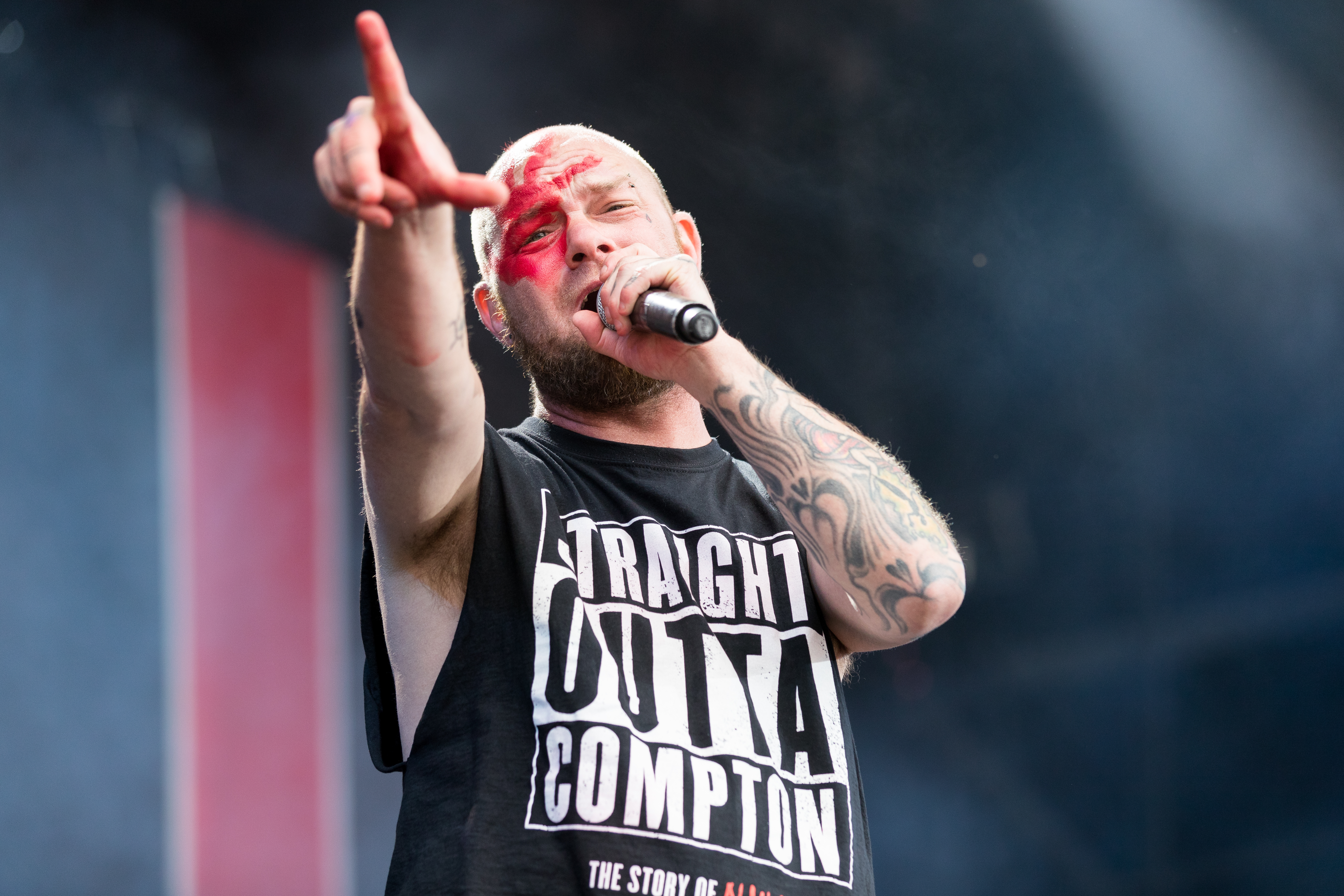
Ivan Moody at Rock am Ring 2017

In May 2009, Five Finger Death Punch announced their second studio album, War Is the Answer. The album was produced by Kevin Churko and mixed by Randy Staub. The album debuted at number 7 on the Billboard 200 and has been certified platinum by the RIAA. The first single from the album, "Hard to See", was released on July 21, 2009. To promote War Is the Answer, Five Finger Death Punch embarked on "The Shock and Raw" US Tour. Main support on the tour was provided by Shadows Fall, with additional support coming from Otep and 2Cents. Upon completing the US run of the tour, Five Finger Death Punch then brought the Shock and Raw tour to Europe, finishing off with a run of dates in the UK. Main support for these dates was again Shadows Fall, and opening acts for the UK portion of the tour were Rise to Remain and Magnacult.

The second single from War Is the Answer, "Walk Away", was released on November 2, 2009. The album also spawned two UK-only singles, "Dying Breed", released on November 16, 2009, and "No One Gets Left Behind", released on March 8, 2010. During March 2010, Five Finger Death Punch traveled to Iraq and played 10 shows for the U.S. troops. The band's cover of Bad Company's self-titled song was released as the fifth single from War Is the Answer on May 17, 2010. On their way to perform at Rock am Ring and Rock im Park Zoltan Bathory, Matt Snell and Jeremy Spencer were detained by German police for alleged international weapons violations. After recognizing the event as a misunderstanding, German police released the band members and they appeared at both Rock im Park on June 4, 2010, and Rock am Ring June 6, 2010, as scheduled.

Five Finger Death Punch also played the Maurice Jones Main Stage at the 2010 Download Festival on June 12, 2010. While playing the song "Dying Breed", their set was cut due to too many people crowd surfing up to the stage. They were allowed to play one final song, "The Bleeding". They played the main stage at Mayhem Festival 2010 with Korn, Rob Zombie and Lamb of God from July 10 until August 14, 2010. On August 17, 2010, they performed the songs "Bad Company" and "Hard to See" on the ABC show Jimmy Kimmel Live!. On September 16, 2010, The band released "Far from Home" as the sixth single from War Is the Answer. They supported Godsmack on their "The Oracle 2010" tour from October 3 – November 4, 2010. The song, "Dying Breed" was featured on the soundtrack for Namco Bandai Games' remake of Splatterhouse, released on November 23, 2010.

=== Snell's departure and American Capitalist (2010–2012) ===
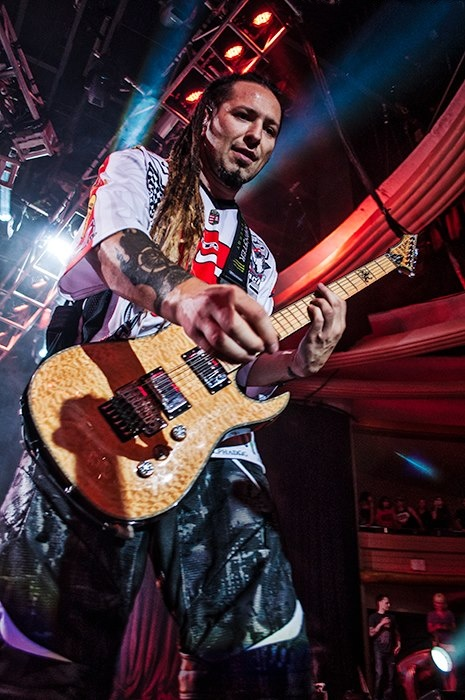
Zoltan Bathory in 2012

The band began to record their third studio album in November 2010 at The Hideout studios in Las Vegas, Nevada. Bassist Matt Snell departed from the band in December 2010, and in June 2011, Chris Kael was announced as Snell's replacement. The band's third album, titled American Capitalist, was released October 11, 2011. Production for the album was handled again by Kevin Churko. The first single from American Capitalist, entitled "Under and Over It", was released on July 27, 2011, following a music video in September 2011. In support of the album, Five Finger Death Punch embarked on their "Share the Welt" tour from October 16 – December 14, 2011, with support from All That Remains, Hatebreed and Rains and their "Furious and Deadly" tour from March 23 – April 12, 2012, with support from Soulfly, Windowpane, and Persist. The song "Back for More" is included on the soundtrack for the video game Madden NFL 12. "Back for More" was released as a digital single on September 13, 2011. "Remember Everything" was released as the second official single for American Capitalist in November 2011, with a music video following in February 2012. "Coming Down" was released as the third official single from American Capitalist in April 2012, with a music video, directed by Nick Peterson, following in June 2012. The song also won the band an Independent Music Award in 2013 for Best Metal/Hardcore Song.

From July 13 to August 28, 2012, Five Finger Death Punch took part in Metal Hammer's "Trespass America Festival" with support from Battlecross, God Forbid, Emmure, Pop Evil, Trivium and Killswitch Engage.

=== The Wrong Side of Heaven and the Righteous Side of Hell (2013–2014) ===
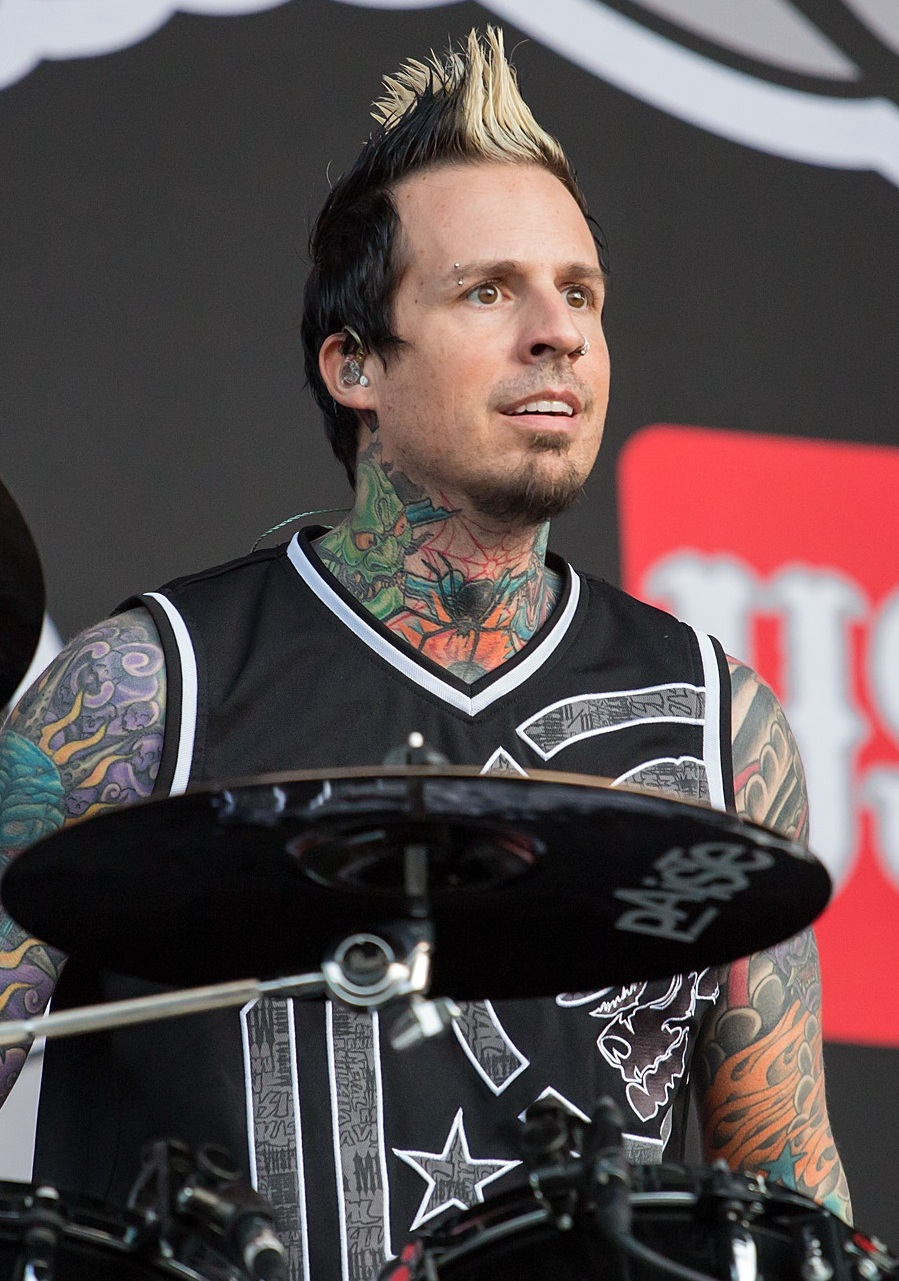
Jeremy Spencer in 2014

On February 28, the band posted a picture on Facebook of Moody recording vocals for the album. On March 12, an update video was posted to YouTube. On March 18, the band was announced to be playing Mayhem Festival 2013. On March 18, Five Finger Death Punch posted a promotional video for their next tour with a new song "Here to Die". The band also announced that they were working on a fourth album, due in the summer.

On May 1, 2013, the band announced the release of their next two studio albums collectively titled The Wrong Side of Heaven and the Righteous Side of Hell with Volume 1 being released on July 30, and Volume 2 following on November 19. During the fifth annual Golden Gods Awards, Five Finger Death Punch performed a new song with Rob Halford of Judas Priest entitled "Lift Me Up". The song was released as a single on May 14.

On June 6, Five Finger Death Punch revealed the artwork for The Wrong Side of Heaven and the Righteous Side of Hell, Volume 1 and also released a snippet of future single "Dot Your Eyes" Volume 1 reached the No. 2 position on the Billboard 200 with 113,000 copies sold in its first week, making it the band's most successful debut to date. The Wrong Side of Heaven and the Righteous Side of Hell Volume 1 has sold over 210,000 copies as of August 2013.

On September 9, 2013, the band released a new single, "Battle Born", in anticipation of their fifth studio album The Wrong Side of Heaven and the Righteous Side of Hell, Volume 2. It sold 77,000 copies in its first week, and once again landed in the No. 2 position on the Billboard 200.

On August 11, 2014, Five Finger Death Punch released a video for the song "Wrong Side of Heaven". The video is about homeless veterans who have post-traumatic stress disorder, traumatic brain injury, and depression after serving in the military, and not receiving the help they need for their illnesses.

=== Got Your Six (2015–2016) ===
On December 12, 2013, Five Finger Death Punch revealed in a radio interview that they had already begun working on a sixth studio album. On January 14, 2015, Five Finger Death Punch announced US Spring headline tour dates from April 25 to May 9, 2015, and their intention to enter the studio to write and record a new album. On May 2, 2015, the band released the title of their sixth album, Got Your Six as well as a teaser for a new song titled "Ain't My Last Dance" on their official Facebook page. The album, which was slated for release on August 28, 2015, was later pushed back to September 4. On May 19, 2015, the band announced a co-headlining North American Tour with Papa Roach to promote the upcoming album and were accompanied by In This Moment as special guests with support by From Ashes to New for the tour. The band also performed on the main stage as part of Download Festival 2015.

=== And Justice for None and Spencer's departure (2016–2019) ===
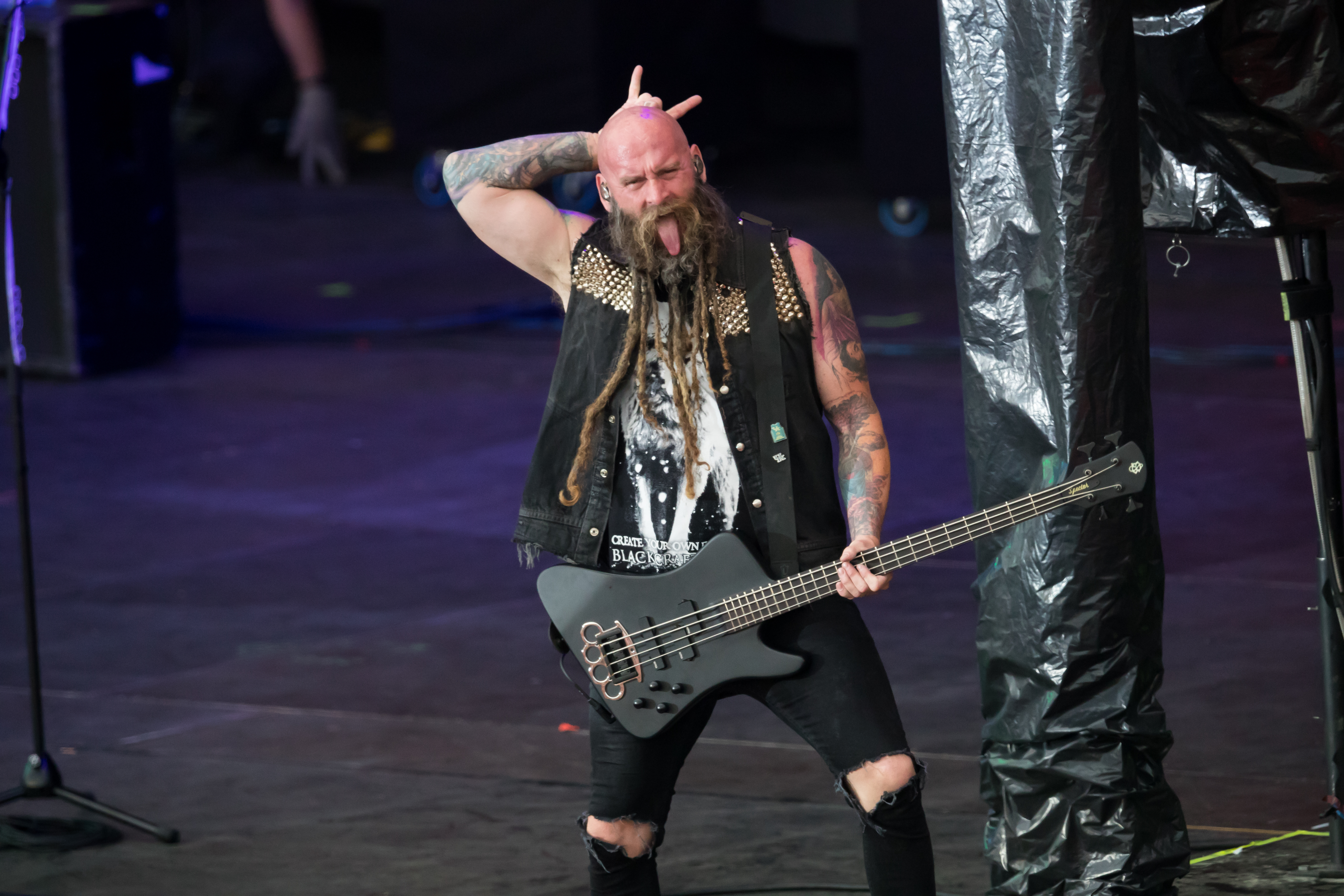
Chris Kael at Rock am Ring, 2017

On April 27, 2016, Billboard reported that Five Finger Death Punch's record label Prospect Park had filed a lawsuit against the band on April 21, 2016, for breaching their contract. The basis of the claim cites that the band began working on a new album without Prospect Park's consent and will be working with Rise Records. In a 2017 interview, vocalist Ivan Moody said he would be completing the current tour and leave the band at the end of the year. The next day however, an announcement was published on the official site of FFDP, where it was revealed, that rumors about Ivan's departure are false. According to the announcement, the vocalist plans to start a side project beside Five Finger Death Punch, which does not mean he has plans on leaving.

However, during a concert in the Netherlands, Moody did not show up to perform the first song, which was sung by Tommy Vext, with Moody saying he was running "a little bit late". Vext also sang a second song during the set later in the evening while Moody walked off stage. During the show all of the members left the stage for long periods on several occasions, and Hook also threw his guitar down and walked offstage at one point. During the set, Moody said that "there is no other singer for Five Finger Death Punch", and then later said "This is my last show with Five Finger Death Punch" before making a slit-throat gesture. Bathory shortly after the show tweeted that the events that transpired were "not a publicity stunt."

The day after the show in Tilburg, Netherlands, the band announced a headline European tour with In Flames and Of Mice & Men in late 2017. Later that same day, the band released a statement addressing what happened at the show via their Facebook page, stating that bands that tour as heavily as they do will "inevitably have a few derailments, but the train always keeps on moving", implying that all shows would proceed as planned and that Moody would remain as the band's frontman. Ivan Moody subsequently checked himself into rehab and sat out the remainder of the tour. Tommy Vext filled in for Moody while he sought treatment. On August 19, Ivan Moody returned to the stage at the Illinois State Fair, although just days prior it was still unknown if he would be taking the stage.

In December 2017, it was announced that the band was working on their seventh studio album. The album, And Justice for None was released May 18, 2018. On December 21, 2017, the band released a video for their cover of "Gone Away" by The Offspring. The cover song was featured on Five Finger Death Punch's greatest hits album, A Decade of Destruction. On April 5, 2018, the band released "Fake" as the lead single from And Justice for None. On April 20, 2018, a second single was released, titled "Sham Pain". A third single "When the Seasons Change" was released on May 4, 2018.

For a Fall 2018 tour with Breaking Benjamin, Charlie Engen replaced Jeremy Spencer to allow him to undergo back surgery. On December 18, it was announced that Spencer had departed the band permanently. In June 2019, it was announced that Jeremy Spencer has continued the band's support of first responders and was sworn in as a reserve police officer in Indiana.

Five Finger Death Punch have also worked with Brantley Gilbert, Brian May of Queen, and Kenny Wayne Shepherd to re-record a new version of Sheperd's song "Blue on Black". The proceeds from the recording support the Gary Sinise Foundation. While a cover of the song had already appeared on And Justice for None, this new version merged Sheperd's blues rock, Gilbert's country, May's classic rock and Five Finger Death Punch's mainstream rock styles.

=== F8 and Hook's departure (2019–2021) ===
On May 9, 2019, the band released a video announcing a "new record in the making". The album, F8 was released on February 28, 2020. The album's lead single, "Inside Out", was released on December 2, 2019. "A Little Bit Off" was released as the second single in June 2020. Both songs topped the Billboard Mainstream Rock songs. On February 4, 2020, it was announced that guitarist Jason Hook was forced to miss the remaining shows of the European tour due to health issues. Andy James was named as substitute for the rest of the tour. It was confirmed on October 12, 2020, that Hook officially left the band, with James replacing him permanently.

=== AfterLife and re-recordings of their greatest hits (2021–2025) ===
In May 2021, it was announced that the band planned on recording their ninth album in 2022. They will also make a 15th anniversary re-recording of their debut album, The Way of the Fist. On April 12, 2022, the band released the title track from their ninth studio album, AfterLife. On the same day, the band announced a U.S. tour with Megadeth, The Hu, and Fire from the Gods, set for August through October 2022. On May 13, 2022, the band released the second single, "IOU". They also announced the release of their ninth studio album, AfterLife, which was released on August 19, 2022. On June 10, 2022, the band released the third single, "Welcome To The Circus". On July 8, 2022, the band released the fourth single, "Times Like These".

The band toured across the U.S. at the end of 2022 with country rock artists Brantley Gilbert and Cory Marks serving as the opening acts.

In 2023, a digital compilation of the 2 volumes of "The Wrong Side of Heaven and Righteous Side of Hell" was made available on streaming platforms.

On January 12, 2024, the band announced the release of a digital deluxe edition of "AfterLife" which was planned to be released on February 9, but was delayed to April 5. It included a bonus track entitled "This Is The Way", featuring the late DMX, along with 3 new acoustic tracks.

In May 2025, it was revealed that Five Finger Death Punch re-recorded their greatest hits in response to their former record label, Prospect Park, selling their masters without the band's consent. On May 16, 2025, a single from the first album was released, with a re-recorded version of "I Refuse" featuring Maria Brink of In This Moment, along with the re-recordings of "Jekyll and Hyde" and their cover of "Bad Company".They released Volume 1 of their re-recorded greatest hits album on July 18, 2025, with 14 re-recorded tracks and 3 live tracks. On September 5, 2025, a single from the second album was released, with a re-recorded version of "The End" featuring Babymetal, along with 2 other tracks: "Hell To Pay" and "M.I.N.E (End This Way)". Volume 2 of their re-recorded greatest hits album was released on October 24, 2025, with the same track listing format as the first.

=== Legacy and 20th anniversary world tour (2026–present) ===
In January 2026, Five Finger Death Punch announced the North American leg of their 20th Anniversary World Tour, playing 48 venues across the U.S., which began on July 20 and will run through October 23. They will be supported by Cody Jinks and Eva Under Fire. In early May, they announced UK and European legs of the tour, which will occur across early 2027 with support from Lamb of God and Bleed from Within.

They performed at Daytona Beach's Welcome to Rockville festival in May 2026. On May 15, 2026, the band released the single, "Eye of the Storm", On June 26, 2026, the band announced their tenth studio album, Legacy, which was released digitally on July 31, 2026, and will be issued later on CD on September 18, 2026. The band also released the album's second single, "De Oppresso Liber". On the same day, the band released a music video for the albums third single, "Nails in the Coffin".

== Musical style and influences ==
"American Capitalist" (2011)
Amy Sciarretto of Loudwire wrote that the title track of Five Finger Death Punch's album American Capitalist "could get a crew of Marine cadets through boot camp".

Five Finger Death Punch's musical style has been described as groove metal, alternative metal, hard rock, nu metal, thrash metal, or heavy metal in general. Thom Jurek of AllMusic wrote that Five Finger Death Punch's "instantly recognizable sound is comprised of equal parts melodic and meaty guitar riffs, fat vamps, catchy hooks, tight, flashy solos, and hard-grooving bass and drums". Bathory described Five Finger Death Punch as "a straight-up heavy metal band with a hint of thrash metal—maybe a hint of the Euro stuff in there". Five Finger Death Punch vocalist Ivan Moody's vocals alternate between screaming and clean singing. The band has released successful ballads as well.

Bathory cited Pantera, Voivod, Iron Maiden, Accept, W.A.S.P., and Yngwie Malmsteen as influences. Ivan Moody cited vocalists such as Mike Patton, Phil Anselmo, Layne Staley and Lynn Strait as influences. Moody credited the witty lyricism of Tool's Maynard James Keenan and Faith No More's Mike Patton as great inspirations. The singer also said, "Pantera is one of our biggest influences". Jeremy Spencer cited drummers such as Lars Ulrich, Dave Lombardo, Gene Hoglan, Dave Grohl, Buddy Rich and Tommy Aldridge as influences. Spencer also cited Prince and David Bowie as influences.

== Band members ==
Current members

- Zoltan Bathory – guitar (2005–present); bass (2005)
- Ivan Moody – lead vocals, occasional keyboards (2006–present)
- Chris Kael – bass, backing vocals (2011–present)
- Charlie Engen – drums (2018–present)
- Andy James – guitar (2020–present)

Former members

- Jeremy Spencer – drums (2005–2018); lead vocals (2005–2006)
- Matt Snell – bass, backing vocals (2005–2010)
- Caleb Andrew Bingham – guitar, backing vocals (2005–2006)
- Darrell Roberts – guitar, backing vocals (2006–2009)
- Jason Hook – guitar, backing vocals (2009–2020)

Former touring musicians

- Philip Labonte – lead vocals (2016)
- Tommy Vext – lead vocals (2017)

== Discography ==
Studio albums

- The Way of the Fist (2007)
- War Is the Answer (2009)
- American Capitalist (2011)
- The Wrong Side of Heaven and the Righteous Side of Hell, Volume 1 (2013)
- The Wrong Side of Heaven and the Righteous Side of Hell, Volume 2 (2013)
- Got Your Six (2015)
- And Justice for None (2018)
- F8 (2020)
- AfterLife (2022)
- Legacy (2026)

== Awards and nominations ==
Revolver Golden Gods Awards

Year	Nominee / work	Award	Result
2012	Zoltan Bathory, Jason Hook	Best Guitarist	Nominated
2012	Ivan Moody	Best Vocalist	Nominated
2012	Jeremy Spencer	Best Drummer	Won
2012	American Capitalist	Album of the Year	Nominated
2013	Five Finger Death Punch	Best Live Band	Nominated
2014	The Wrong Side of Heaven...	Album of the Year	Nominated
2014	Ivan Moody	Best Vocalist	Nominated
2014	Zoltan Bathory, Jason Hook	Best Guitarist	Nominated
2014	Chris Kael	Best Bassist	Won
2014	Lift Me Up	Song of the Year	Won
2014	Five Finger Death Punch	Most Dedicated Fans	Nominated

Metal Hammer Golden Gods Awards

Year	Nominee / work	Award	Result
2009	Five Finger Death Punch	Best New Band	Won
2010	Five Finger Death Punch	Best Breakthrough Band	Won
2010	Zoltan Bathory	Best Shredder	Won
2012	Five Finger Death Punch	Best International Band	Nominated
2012	Zoltan Bathory	Metal As Fuck	Nominated
2013	Five Finger Death Punch	Best International Band	Nominated
2014	Five Finger Death Punch	Best Live Band	Nominated

Kerrang! Awards

Year	Nominee / work	Award	Result
2009	Five Finger Death Punch	Best International Newcomer	Nominated

Radio Contraband Rock Radio Awards

Year	Nominee / work	Award	Result
2011	Five Finger Death Punch	Indie Artist of the Year	Won
2012	Five Finger Death Punch	Indie Artist of the Year	Won
2012	American Capitalist	Album of the Year	Won
2012	Coming Down	Song of the Year	Won
2013	Five Finger Death Punch	Indie Artist of the Year	Won
2014	Five Finger Death Punch	Indie Artist of the Year	Won
2014	Wrong Side of Heaven	Video of the Year	Won

Bandit Rock Awards

Year	Nominee / work	Award	Result
2014	The Wrong Side of Heaven...	Best International Album	Won
2014	Five Finger Death Punch	Best International Group	Won
2016	Five Finger Death Punch	Best International Artist	Won
2019	Five Finger Death Punch	Best International Artist	Won
2019	And Justice For None	Best International Album	Won

Loudwire Music Awards

Year	Nominee / work	Award	Result
2013	The Wrong Side of Heaven...	Rock Album of the Year	Nominated
2013	Lift Me Up	Rock Song of the Year	Nominated
2013	Five Finger Death Punch	Rock Band of the Year	Nominated
2013	Five Finger Death Punch	Most Devoted Fans	Nominated
2013	Five Finger Death Punch	Best Live Act	Nominated
2014	Wrong Side of Heaven	Best Rock Video	Won
2015	Got Your Six	Best Rock Album	Nominated
2015	Wash It All Away	Best Rock Song	Nominated
2015	Five Finger Death Punch	Best Rock Band	Nominated
2015	Zoltan Bathory, Jason Hook	Best Guitarist	Nominated
2015	Jeremy Spencer	Best Drummer	Won

SiriusXM Octane Music Awards

Year	Nominee / work	Award	Result
2014	Five Finger Death Punch	Best Live Band	Won
2015	Five Finger Death Punch	Artist of the Year	Won

iHeartRadio Music Awards

Year	Nominee / work	Award	Result
2016	Five Finger Death Punch	Rock Artist of the Year	Nominated
2020	Five Finger Death Punch	Rock Artist of the Year	Nominated
2020	"Blue on Black"	Rock Song of the Year	Nominated
2022	"Living the Dream"	Rock Song of the Year	Nominated
2022	Five Finger Death Punch	Rock Artist of the Year	Nominated
