= Jeremy Spencer (drummer) =

American drummer

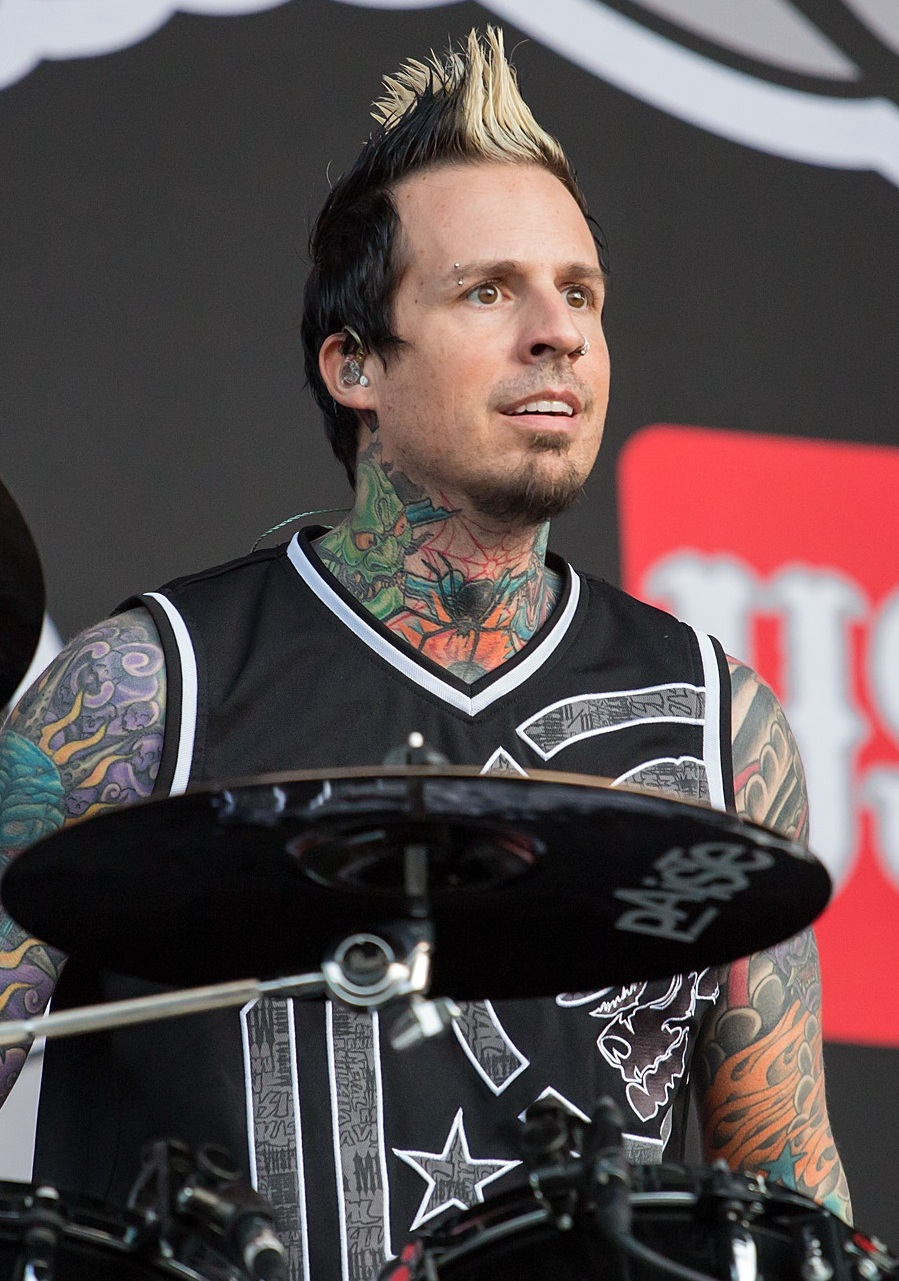
- Spencer performing with Five Finger Death Punch in 2014

Background information
- Also known as: Grym Synner; Devil Daddy
- Born: Jeremy Spencer Heyde; January 8, 1973 (age 53); Oakland City, Indiana, U.S.
- Genres: Groove metal; alternative metal; hard rock; gothic rock; death metal
- Occupations: Musician; songwriter
- Instruments: Drums; percussion; vocals
- Years active: 1990s–present
- Member of: Semi-Rotted
- Formerly of: Five Finger Death Punch; Psycho Synner

Jeremy Spencer Heyde (born January 8, 1973) is an American musician, best known as the former drummer of heavy metal band Five Finger Death Punch. As of 2022, he is the lead singer of the groove/death metal band Semi-Rotted.

In 2012, Spencer was named Golden God's "Best Drummer" by Revolver magazine, and was voted "Best Drummer of 2015" by Loudwire. He was also voted "Best Drummer" at the 5th Annual Loudwire Music Awards.

== Career ==
Jeremy Spencer Heyde was born on January 8, 1973. He started playing drums at the age of nine on a drum set his grandmother purchased at Sears. Spencer's musical influences include a lot of 1980s metal. Growing up in Boonville, Indiana, he was a member of several local bands, one of which (Cornucopia of Death) opened in Indianapolis for Pantera, when he was 17. After high school, Spencer moved to Los Angeles, where he met BulletBoys guitarist Mick Sweda. In L.A., he became friends with future Five Finger Death Punch guitarist Jason Hook. Spencer played in a number of bands, with the typical frustration of unreleased material and shelved projects—while working a variety of odd jobs—including recording tracks with heavy metal band W.A.S.P.

Spencer's autobiography, Death Punch'd – Surviving Five Finger Death Punch's Metal Mayhem, was published on September 2, 2014, by HarperCollins imprint Dey St, and named a New York Times Celebrity Bestseller.

=== Five Finger Death Punch (2005–2018) ===
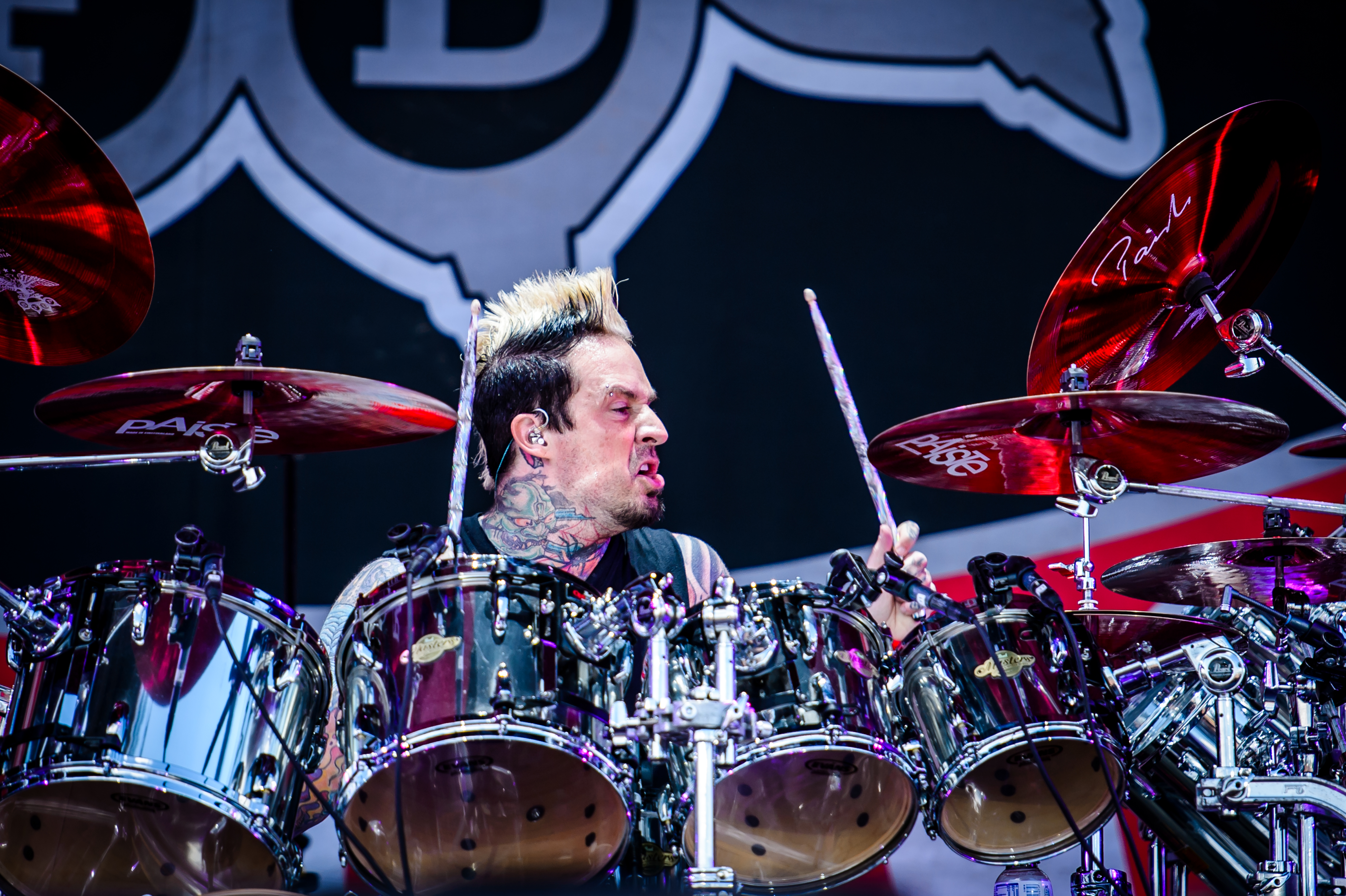
Spencer performing in 2017

In 2005, Spencer and former U.P.O. bassist Zoltan Bathory formed the heavy metal band Five Finger Death Punch with vocalist Ivan Moody, bassist Matt Snell, and guitarist Caleb Bingham.

The group recorded its first album in 2006. They signed a record deal with Firm Music and on July 10, 2007, released an EP called "Pre-Emptive Strike" from their debut album, The Way of the Fist, followed by the album's lead single, "The Bleeding". The album was certified Gold and spawned three Top 10 singles. The band's second album, War Is the Answer, debuted at No. 7 on Billboard Top 200—staying in the Top 100 for 89 weeks and selling over 500,000 units. American Capitalist, debuted at No. 3 on the Billboard Album charts (October 2011) and achieved Gold status (September 2012). "Coming Down" is the band's first No. 1 single (2012). In 2013, Five Finger Death Punch released The Wrong Side of Heaven and the Righteous Side of Hell, Vol. 1 & 2. Both volumes debuted at No. 2 on Billboard's Hot 200 Album Chart. The first single, Lift Me Up (with Rob Halford of Judas Priest), reached No. 1 on the Active Rock Chart and won the Revolver Golden Gods Award for "Song of the Year". In 2015, Got Your Six debuted at No. 1 on the Billboard top album charts.

For a fall 2018 tour with Breaking Benjamin, Spencer was replaced by Charlie Engen in order to undergo surgery on his back. On December 18, it was announced that Spencer would not be returning to the band due to the damage in his back.

=== Post-drumming career, Psycho Synner and Semi-Rotted (2018–present) ===
Spencer departed Five Finger Death Punch permanently in December 2018. He cited his recent back surgery as his reason for leaving, saying in an interview in July 2020, "I physically reached a point where I wasn't being able to perform the way I like to perform. And I'd done it for so many years and hurt myself so much doing it. I really enjoyed the time. But it was obvious that - like, athletes retire at a certain point because their bodies aren't working. And you do anything for 14 years, it starts to grind you down mentally too." In June 2019, it was announced that Spencer has continued the band's support of first responders and was sworn in as a reserve police officer in Indiana.

On September 17, 2019, it was announced that Spencer would be acting, co-directing, writing and providing the music for the soft pornographic horror parody series Lady Killer TV, which he also created. In the announcement, he stated: "I've had this idea in my head for a long time, and it was now or never in terms of pulling the trigger and making this series happen." The series features several prominent pornographic actors and actresses, such as Tori Black, Adriana Chechik, Nikki Benz and Tommy Pistol.

Between 2020 and 2023, Spencer was the frontman of Psycho Synner (formerly Psychosexual), an alternative metal band where he performed under the name Grym Synner (formerly Devil Daddy). On October 31, 2021, he released nine Psycho Synner albums. In July 2023, he revealed he had disbanded Psycho Synner and was now solely focused on his new band, Semi-Rotted.

== Personal life ==
Spencer is the son of novelist Austin Gary and actress Glory Heyde (née Kissel). His sister Rachel Rockwell was an acclaimed stage director before her death in 2018.
