= Jason Hook =

Canadian guitarist

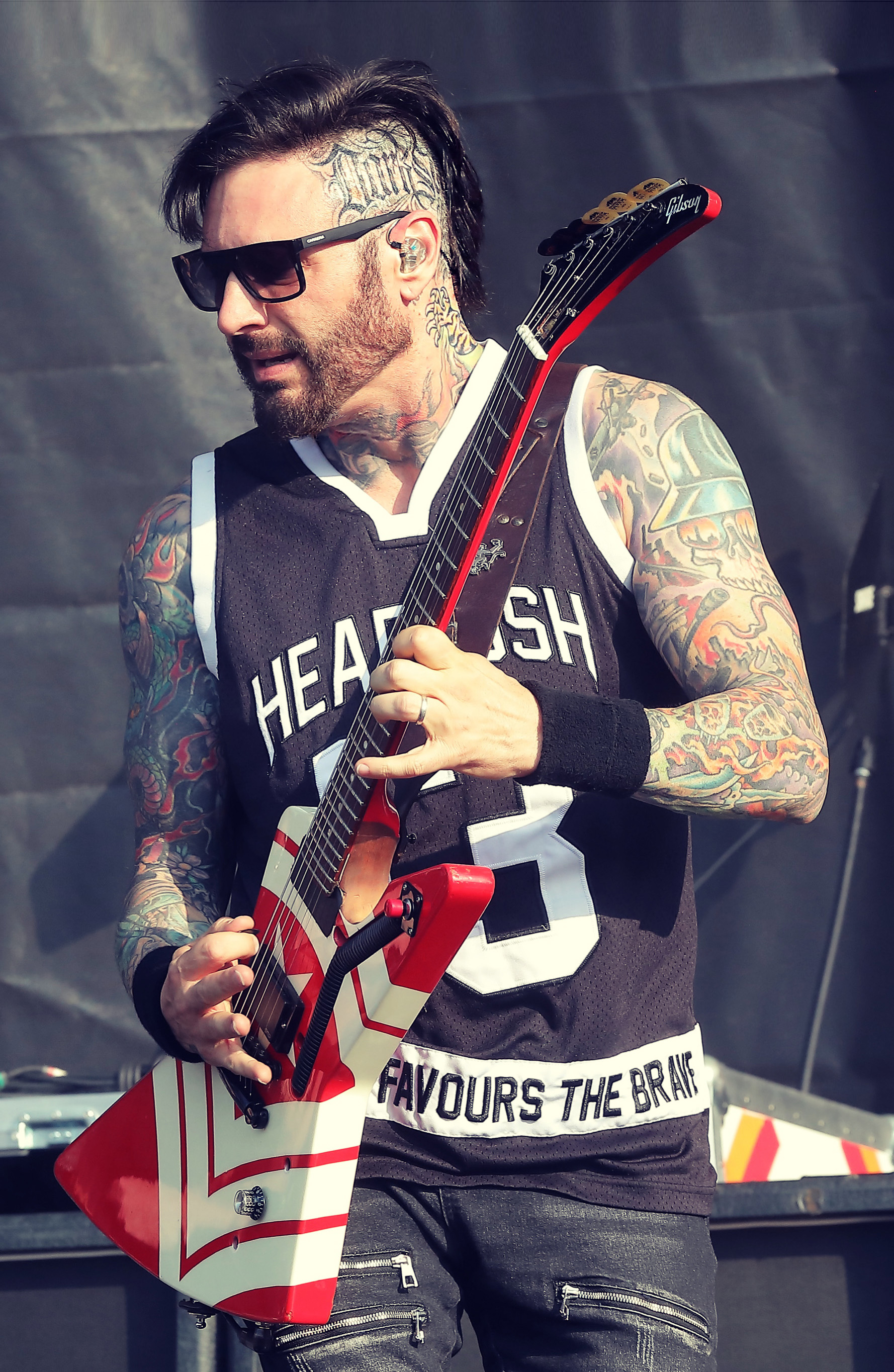
- Hook in 2023

Background information
- Born: Thomas Jason Grinstead; 1970 or 1971 (age 55–56); Toronto, Ontario, Canada
- Genres: Groove metal; alternative metal; hard rock
- Occupations: Musician; songwriter
- Instrument: Guitar
- Member of: Flat Black
- Formerly of: Five Finger Death Punch; Bulletboys
- Website: flatblackmusic.com

Jason Hook (born Thomas Jason Grinstead; 1970/1971) is a Canadian guitarist, best known as a former guitarist of the American heavy metal band Five Finger Death Punch. After his departure, he founded the heavy metal/hard rock band Flat Black.

== Early life ==
Hook was born in Toronto, Ontario.

== Career ==
=== Early career, session and solo work (1994–2009) ===
Hook spent many years in Canada honing his craft and was eventually signed to Elektra with his band No Love Lost. The band recorded an album with producer Beau Hill in Los Angeles which remained unreleased. Now, on his own in Los Angeles as a session musician, Hook took a stint in the hard rock band BulletBoys. In 2000, he was hired by pop singer Hilary Duff as the guitarist in her live lineup; he also served as the session guitarist recording tracks for her. Hook also supported Mandy Moore on her 2001 tour. Hook became a highly coveted session player in the L.A. circuit and went on to tour and record with acts like the Vince Neil Band and Alice Cooper.

In 2007, Hook released his debut instrumental hard rock/metal album Safety Dunce. He recorded his second solo release, American Justice (still unreleased), in 2009, which featured guest appearances from Alice Cooper and members of Five Finger Death Punch.

=== Five Finger Death Punch (2009–2020) ===
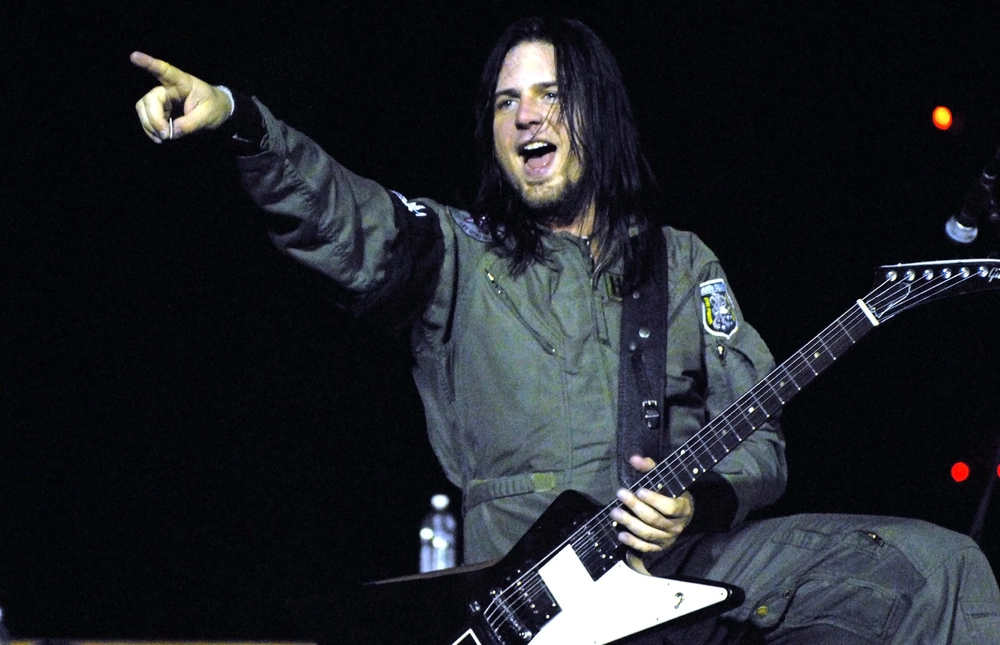
Hook with Five Finger Death Punch in 2010

In early 2009, it was announced that Hook was joining heavy metal band Five Finger Death Punch, replacing guitarist Darrell Roberts. On September 22, 2009, Hook and his bandmates released War Is the Answer, which landed them a number 7 debut on the Billboard Top 200 album. Five Finger Death Punch had great success in the following years including 14 number one songs and a total of 12 million albums sold worldwide. Some of the band's more popular hits were co-written by Hook, including "Inside Out", "Sham Pain", "Lift Me Up", "Battle Born", "A Little Bit Off", "Wash It All Away", "Coming Down", and "Remember Everything". In 2019, Hook had emergency gallbladder surgery, which caused him to miss the remainder of Five Finger Death Punch's European tour. Guitarist Andy James of Sacred Mother Tongue replaced him for the remainder of the tour.

Hook left Five Finger Death Punch in February 2020. His departure was officially announced by the band in October, with Andy James permanently replacing him. In an interview in 2021, Hook said about his departure from the band, "As for the reason I'm leaving… well, there really isn't just one. I've been in bands my entire life and I feel like I've done all the good that I can here. It's time to pass the baton and move on to new challenges."

=== Flat Black and guest appearances (2020–present) ===
During the COVID-19 pandemic, Hook kept busy with several different projects, including a feature on Cory Marks's 2021 single "Blame It on the Double" and a collaboration with Dorothy on the song "A Beautiful Life" (from the album Gifts from the Holy Ghost).

In 2023, Hook's new heavy metal band Flat Black emerged with new management in Shelter Music Group. In July 2023, the band signed with Concord Music Group / Fearless Records. Flat Black's debut album Dark Side of the Brain, co-produced by Hook, was released on July 19, 2024.

== TV and film appearances ==
Hook appeared on the History Channel's Counting Cars on July 9, 2013. His motorcycle had broken down on the side of the road and the show's star, Danny "The Count" Koker, "happened to" come along and helped get Hook's motorcycle running. Hook later appeared in the episode receiving an Ace Frehley tattoo at Koker's tattoo shop.

Hook also appeared in an episode of My Cat from Hell.

Hook appeared in the documentary film Hired Gun (2016).

== Discography ==
Monkeyhead

- 2001: Monkeyhead

Bulletboys

- 2003: Sophie

Solo

- 2007: Safety Dunce

Five Finger Death Punch

- 2009: War Is the Answer
- 2011: American Capitalist
- 2013: The Wrong Side of Heaven and the Righteous Side of Hell, Volume 1
- 2013: The Wrong Side of Heaven and the Righteous Side of Hell, Volume 2
- 2015: Got Your Six
- 2018: And Justice for None
- 2020: F8

Flat Black

- 2024: Dark Side of the Brain

As featured artist

- 2020: Cory Marks & Tyler Connolly – "Blame It on the Double"
- 2022: Ra & Keith Wallen – "Incomplete"
- 2022: Art of Dying – "Long Shot"
