= Zoltan Bathory =

Hungarian-American guitarist

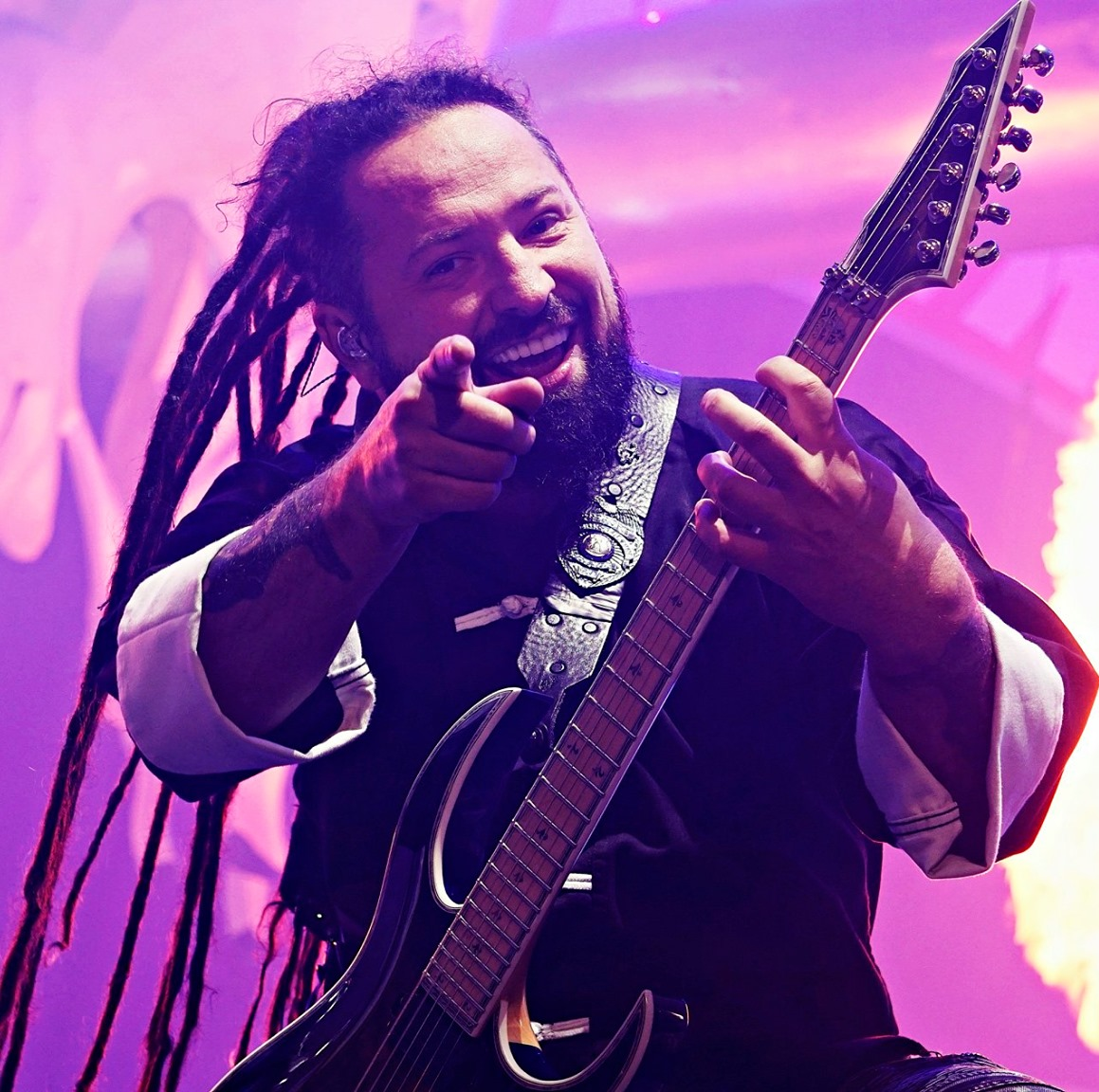
- Bathory performing with Five Finger Death Punch in 2020

Background information
- Born: 1978 (age 47–48); Szentendre, Hungary
- Genres: Groove metal; alternative metal; hard rock
- Occupations: Musician; songwriter; record producer; martial artist
- Instrument: Guitar
- Member of: Five Finger Death Punch
- Formerly of: U.P.O.
- Website: zoltanbathory.com

Zoltan Bathory (born 1978) is a Hungarian-American musician and martial artist. He is the founder and rhythm guitarist of Las Vegas-based heavy metal band Five Finger Death Punch. In 2010, he won the Metal Hammer Golden God award for "Best Shredder". Five Finger Death Punch has released ten studio albums and is one of the most successful modern metal bands.

He is an actively competing martial artist, a first degree black belt in jiu-jitsu and 4th Degree Black Belt in judo, and 2021's Jiu-Jitsu American Nationals Silver Medalist. in Black Belt Masters Super Heavy Division. Bathory is also a founding board member of the veterans nonprofit Home Deployment Project in Las Vegas and sits on the Board of Advisors at VETPAW (Veterans Empowered to Protect African Wildlife), an anti-poaching organization operating on the African continent, composed of US combat veterans.

== Career ==
Bathory joined the post-grunge band U.P.O. in 2004, replacing Ben Shirley on bass. He left the band in 2005, switched back to guitar, and went on to form the heavy metal band Five Finger Death Punch in Los Angeles, California.

Five Finger Death Punch recorded their debut album in 2006 with engineers Steve Bruno and Mike Sarkisyan. It was mixed by Soulfly/Machine Head guitarist Logan Mader. Soon after finishing the album, the band was signed by a major management company The Firm and The Way of the Fist was released on July 31, 2007. This self-produced record sold 500,000 copies in the US and spawned three top-10 singles. Their follow-up album, War Is the Answer was released on September 22, 2009, through Prospect Park Records. The record debuted number 7 on the Billboard 200 and all four singles (off of the album) made it to the top 10 mainstream rock charts. War Is the Answer stayed on Billboard's Top 100 for over a record-breaking 92 weeks and sold over 1,000,000 copies.

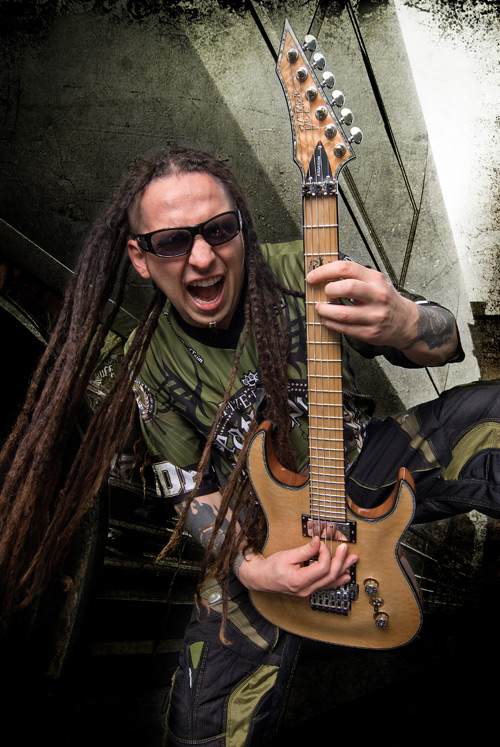
Bathory in 2010

Their third record American Capitalist was even more successful. It debuted at number 3 on the Billboard 200, had another three top 10 singles and it achieved Gold status within a year of its release. It has since been certified Platinum. In 2013, the band released a double studio album The Wrong Side of Heaven and the Righteous Side of Hell, Volume 1 and Volume 2 within three months from each other. Both albums debuted at number 2 on the Billboard 200 chart. Volume 1 featured guest vocalists Rob Halford of Judas Priest, Maria Brink of In This Moment, Tech N9ne, Jamey Jasta of Hatebreed, and Max Cavalera of Sepultura and Soulfly. Both albums also became certified Platinum.

The band's sixth record Got Your Six was the band's biggest first-week commercial success. The record was number one on Billboard 200's physical sales chart and number 2 on the overall charts. Since 2010, only six metal albums had achieved RIAA Certified Platinum Status: Metallica's Hardwired... to Self-Destruct and five of Five Finger Death Punch's albums (War Is the Answer, American Capitalist, Wrong Side of Heaven, Volume 1 and Volume 2, and Got Your Six). The band have had twenty one top 10 hit singles on U.S. Mainstream Rock Radio. Bathory won the "Best Shredder" award at the 2010 Metal Hammer Golden Gods Awards. The award was the third Golden God trophy the band received (the first was for 2009 Best New Artist and the second for 2010 Breakthrough Artist, respectively).

In 2013, the band was nominated and won another Golden God Award (Song of the Year) with "Lift Me Up". This number one mainstream rock hit featured Rob Halford of Judas Priest as a guest vocalist. Halford and Rob Zombie joined the band's performance at the Golden Gods Award Ceremony.

In 2017, it was announced that Bathory expanded into artist management and took a new band, Bad Wolves, under his wing. Bad Wolves' first record Disobey was released in May 2018 via Eleven Seven Records. The Bathory managed band's first single "Zombie" became a number one hit in the United States and several other countries.

Shortly after, Bathory signed a second band to his management company, Fire from the Gods.

== Equipment ==
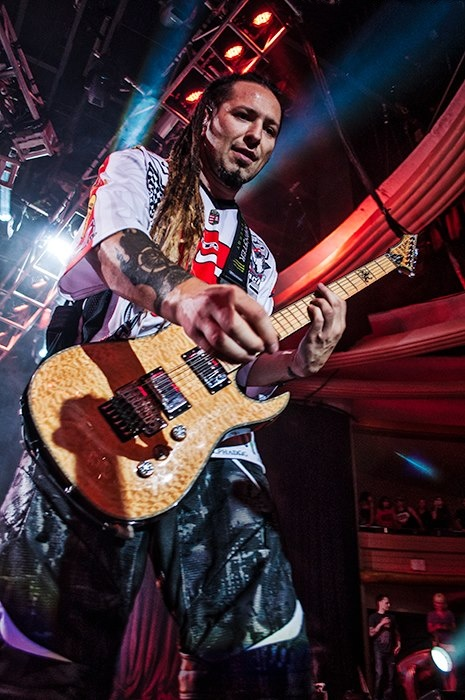
Bathory performing in 2012

In 2009, B.C. Rich launched three Zoltan Bathory Artist Signature Guitars: Bathory – Assassin (Artist Signature Model). Bathory runs this through TC Electronic G-System and Diamond Amplifiers. He uses a Dunlop heavy core string set (gauge of .13 to .66).

It was announced in November 2014, that DBZ Guitars had teamed up with Bathory to create the company's first ever Diamond signature guitars. Although Bathory made the switch to Diamond/DBZ guitars in late 2014, the company claims he goes way back with Diamond, as he designed several guitars in Diamond's arsenal in the past (Bird of Pray, Halcyon) and he's used their amplifiers for over a decade.

== Other work ==
Bathory was a contributing writer for the nationally distributed Skillset magazine.

In May 2014, Bathory joined Monster Jam Free Style World Champion Jimmy Creten's Monster Truck Racing Team 2Xtreme Racing as their driver behind the wheel of the new Knucklehead truck. Bathory's professional debut took place in California at the WGAS Motorsport Flip Fest Monster Truck and Motocross Show. Bathory raced at Florida's EastBay Race Way, Kansas City Speedway, Newfoundland Raceway in Canada, and appeared at the 2015 Monster Jam Finals in Las Vegas.

In July 2023, Bathory appeared in Call of Duty: Modern Warfare II (2022) as a likeness model for a playable character, Oz, in the multiplayer modes.

=== Martial arts ===
In his private life, Bathory is an actively competing martial artist, who practices judo (4th degree black belt) and Brazilian jiu-jitsu (black belt), often appearing in martial art magazines. He is a member of the Gracie Humaita Jiu-Jitsu Competition Team, under Professor Amilcar Cipili (5th Degree) and 8th Degree Black Belt Master Royler Gracie. Bathory won the silver medal at the 2021 American National JiuJitsu Championship in the Black Belt Super Heavy Weight Masters Division and the Open Weight Class Absolute Division. He also placed second at the Abu-Dhabi Pro Jiu-Jitsu World Trials and at the North American Grappling Championship in 2011. He placed third at the 2012 Masters World Championship in his division. He is one of the few civilians certified by the US Army as an L1 Modern Army Combatives Instructor – Close Quarter Combat. Bathory also practices Wing Chun Kung-Fu under Grand Master Randy Williams C.R.C. Academy and Guerilla Jiu-Jitsu under professor John Simons III. Bathory is featured in former Navy Seal Team 6 operator Clint Emerson's "100 Deadly Skills Combat Edition – The Most Dangerous Men in America" series.

In a Revolver magazine article, it was revealed that he is a co-owner of Epic Roll, a premier jiu-jitsu gear manufacturer.

In January 2024, it was announced that Bathory had partnered with and acquired a large stake in The Professional Grappling Federation, a Pro Jiu-Jitsu League. Their investment in the league led the competition to new heights with a record-breaking $100,000 grand prize and the involvement of some of the most legendary names in the sport, including Roger Gracie, Andre Galvao, Eddie Bravo, and Rigan Machado as team captains.

On March 19, 2024, it was announced that Bathory and his partners Brandon McCraghen, Heather Gracie and Keelan Lawyer of PGF (Professional Grappling Federation) had inked a deal with the UFC for their BJJ competition league to be broadcast on UFC Fight Pass.

=== Philanthropy ===
Five Finger Death Punch have played many military benefit concerts, visited bases around the world and spearheaded a fundraising campaign for veterans suffering from post-traumatic stress disorder and traumatic brain injury.

In 2014, the band launched a campaign that raised over $225,000. The band used their recent music video for their latest single "Wrong Side of Heaven" to focus on the theme and launched website 5fdp4Vets.com. They also started selling a custom jersey which was designed by Bathory, on Indiegogo. The funds raised went to organizations that raise awareness about post-traumatic stress disorder.

Bathory was elected as the chairman of development of the non-profit organization The Home Deployment Project in Las Vegas, helping veterans suffering from post-traumatic stress disorder and chronic homelessness.

In 2017, it was announced that Bathory had joined VETPAW (Veterans Empowered to Protect African Wildlife), an anti-poaching organization consisting of US combat veterans. VETPAW focuses on fighting against illegal rhino killings on the continent. To achieve this, VETPAW launched Operation Rhino Shield in South Africa where they deployed a team of Army, Marine and Navy veterans on private reserves that are under direct threat from rhino poachers.

Bathory is a long-time supporter of law enforcement and first responders. In 2017, Five Finger Death Punch donated $58,000 to The Badge of Honor Memorial Foundation, an organization recognized by the Department of Justice, that's available to assist the departments and families of fallen police officers by identifying all the federal and state benefits that are available for them.

In 2018, Bathory spearheaded another campaign wherein his band Five Finger Death Punch donated a portion of their ticket sales ($95,000) to C.O.P.S. (Concerns of Police Survivors), an organization that supports families of officers killed in the line of duty by offering scholarships, counseling services and peer support.

In 2019, Five Finger Death Punch teamed up with Brantley Gilbert, Brian May of Queen and Kenny Wayne Shepherd to re-record a new version of Shepherd's song "Blue on Black". All proceeds from the recording is donated to First Responders via The Gary Sinise Foundation.

== Jiu-Jitsu and Judo Championship records ==
| Event | Location | Division | Result | Date |
|---|---|---|---|---|
| NYC Veterans Open Judo Championship | New York | Black Belt 100Kg | Gold | Jan 31, 2026 |
| Presidents Cup Judo Championship | Dallas | Black Belt 100Kg+ | Gold | Nov 23, 2025 |
| IBJJF American Nationals Jiu-Jitsu Championship | Las Vegas | Black Belt Heavy Masters | Bronze | June 26, 2025 |
| IBJJF International Open Jiu-Jitsu Championship | Denver | Black Belt Heavy Masters | Silver | May 6, 2023 |
| IBJJF International Open Jiu-Jitsu Championship | Los Angeles | Black Belt Super Heavy Masters | Bronze | Mar 11, 2023 |
| IBJJF International Open Jiu-Jitsu Championship | Los Angeles | Black Belt Super Heavy Masters | Gold | Mar 19, 2022 |
| IBJJF International Open Jiu-Jitsu Championship | Los Angeles | Black Belt Absolute Masters | Gold | Mar 19, 2022 |
| IBJJF International Open Jiu-Jitsu Championship | Dallas | Black Belt Ultra Heavy Masters | Bronze | Mar 5, 2022 |
| IBJJF International Open Jiu-Jitsu Championship | New Orleans | Black Belt Ultra Heavy Masters | Silver | Feb 19, 2022 |
| IBJJF American Nationals Jiu-Jitsu Championship | Las Vegas | Black Belt Super Heavy Masters | Silver | Jun 25, 2021 |
| IBJJF American Nationals Jiu-Jitsu Championship | Las Vegas | Black Belt Absolute Masters | Silver | Jun 25, 2021 |
| IBJJF Jiu-Jitsu World Championship | Long Beach | Blue Belt Medium Heavy | Bronze | Aug 7, 2012 |
| Grapplers Quest | Las Vegas | Blue Belt Medium Heavy | Bronze | Jul 11, 2011 |
| Abu Dhabi Pro Trials Jiu-Jitsu Championship | Las Vegas | Blue Belt Medium Heavy | Silver | Jan 29, 2010 |
