= List of Billboard Mainstream Rock number-one songs of the 2020s =

The Billboard Mainstream Rock chart is compiled from the number of airplay songs received from active rock and heritage rock radio stations in the United States. Below are the songs that have reached number one on the chart during the 2020s, listed in chronological order.

== 2020s ==
† – Number-one mainstream rock song of the year.

Issue date	Song	Artist(s)	Weeks at number one	Ref.
2020
January 4	"Under the Graveyard"	Ozzy Osbourne	3 (Note: Total chart run at number one—3 weeks at the end of 2019 and 3 weeks at the beginning of 2020)	
January 25	"Killing Me Slowly"	Bad Wolves	1	
February 1	"Attention Attention"	Shinedown	1	
February 8	"Inside Out"	Five Finger Death Punch	2	
February 22	"History of Violence"	Theory of a Deadman	1	
February 29	"Inside Out"	Five Finger Death Punch	2	
March 14	"Die to Live"	Volbeat featuring Neil Fallon	1	
March 21	"Hurricane"	I Prevail	2	
April 4	"Oh Yeah!"	Green Day	2	
April 18	"Far Away"	Breaking Benjamin featuring Scooter Ward	3	
May 9	"Popular Monster"	Falling in Reverse	1	
May 16	"Unforgettable"	Godsmack	5	
June 20	"Sober"	Bad Wolves	2	
July 4	"A Little Bit Off"†	Five Finger Death Punch	4	
August 1	"Death by Rock and Roll"	The Pretty Reckless	3	
August 22	"Atlas Falls"	Shinedown	2	
September 5	"All Within My Hands"	Metallica and San Francisco Symphony	4	
October 3	"Patience"	Chris Cornell	1	
October 10	"Dangerous"	Seether	3	
October 31	"Black Eyes Blue"	Corey Taylor	2	
November 14	"Shot in the Dark"	AC/DC	5	
December 19	"Shame Shame"	Foo Fighters	6	
2021 (Note: Bring Me the Horizon's "Teardrops" peaked at number 2 in June 2021, but was ranked number-one on the year-end chart of 2021.)
January 30	"My Way, Soon"	Greta Van Fleet	1	
February 6	"Living the Dream"	Five Finger Death Punch	1	
February 13	"Trouble's Coming"	Royal Blood	2	
February 27	"Distance"	Mammoth WVH	2	
March 13	"The Ending"	Papa Roach	1	
March 20	"Self Destructor"	Chevelle	3	
April 10	"Waiting on a War"	Foo Fighters	2	
April 24	"And So It Went"	The Pretty Reckless featuring Tom Morello	2	
May 8	"Breathe Again"	Pop Evil	1	
May 15	"Bruised and Bloodied"	Seether	1	
May 22	"Let the Bad Times Roll"	The Offspring	1	
May 29	"Bruised and Bloodied"	Seether	1	
June 5	"Mercy"	Ayron Jones	4	
July 3	"Darkness Settles In"	Five Finger Death Punch	5	
August 7	"Nowhere Generation"	Rise Against	1	
August 14	"For the Glory"	All Good Things featuring Johnny 3 Tears & Charlie Scene	1	
August 21	"Wait a Minute My Girl"	Volbeat	3	
September 11	"Don't Back Down"	Mammoth WVH	1	
September 18	"Making a Fire"	Foo Fighters	1	
September 25	"Only Love Can Save Me Now"	The Pretty Reckless featuring Kim Thayil and Matt Cameron	3	
October 16	"Survivor"	Pop Evil	2	
October 30	"Wasteland"	Seether	1	
November 6	"Back from the Dead"	Halestorm	1	
November 13	"Alone Again"	Asking Alexandria	1	
November 20	"Kill the Noise"	Papa Roach	4	
December 18	"Shotgun Blues"	Volbeat	2	
2022
January 1	"Hunter's Moon"	Ghost	1	
January 8	"Shotgun Blues"	Volbeat	1	
January 15	"Dead Inside"	Nita Strauss and David Draiman	3	
February 5	"So Called Life"†	Three Days Grace	4	
March 5	"Planet Zero"	Shinedown	8	
April 30	"Zombified"	Falling in Reverse	1	
May 7	"Won't Stand Down"	Muse	1	
May 14	"Dead Man Walking"	Jelly Roll	1	
May 21	"Call Me Little Sunshine"	Ghost	2	
June 4	"The Steeple"	Halestorm	1	
June 11	"AfterLife"	Five Finger Death Punch	4	
July 9	"Lifetime"	Three Days Grace	3	
July 30	"Patient Number 9"	Ozzy Osbourne featuring Jeff Beck	3	
August 20	"Daylight"	Shinedown	2	
September 3	"Hey You"	Disturbed	3	
September 24	"No Apologies"	Papa Roach	1	
October 1	"Times Like These"	Five Finger Death Punch	3	
October 22	"Masterpiece"	Motionless in White	1	
October 29	"Natural Born Killer"	Highly Suspect	1	
November 5	"Bad Things"	I Prevail	1	
November 12	"Surrender"	Godsmack	5	
December 17	"Lux Æterna"	Metallica	11	
2023
March 4	"Welcome to the Circus"	Five Finger Death Punch	1	
March 11	"Just Pretend"	Bad Omens	1	
March 18	"Lost"†	Linkin Park	8	
May 13	"Cut the Line"	Papa Roach	1	
May 20	"Rescued"	Foo Fighters	6	
July 1	"72 Seasons"	Metallica	2	
July 15	"Need a Favor"	Jelly Roll	3	
August 5	"Lowest in Me"	Staind	2	
August 19	"Unstoppable"	Disturbed	2	
September 2	"The Dirt I'm Buried In"	Avatar	2	
September 16	"Blood in the Water"	Ayron Jones	1	
September 23	"Beyond"	Corey Taylor	1	
September 30	"Under You"	Foo Fighters	1	
October 7	"Psycho"	Asking Alexandria	4	
November 4	"Too Far Gone?"	Metallica	1	
November 11	"Skeletons"	Pop Evil	1	
November 18	"Might Love Myself"	Beartooth	1	
November 25	"The American Dream Is Killing Me"	Green Day	8	
2024
January 20	"A Symptom of Being Human"	Shinedown	4	
February 17	"Artificial"	Daughtry	1	
February 24	"Leave a Light On (Talk Away the Dark)"	Papa Roach	3	
March 16	"Dark Matter"	Pearl Jam	4	
April 13	"The Glass"	Foo Fighters	1	
April 20	"Friendly Fire"	Linkin Park	1	
April 27	"Dilemma"	Green Day	2	
May 11	"I Was Alive"	Beartooth	1	
May 18	"Screaming Suicide"	Metallica	2	
June 1	"Truth"	Godsmack	2	
June 15	"This Is the Way"	Five Finger Death Punch featuring DMX	2	
June 29	"If It Doesn't Hurt"†	Nothing More	2	
July 13	"Wreckage"	Pearl Jam	1	
July 20	"All My Life"	Falling In Reverse featuring Jelly Roll	5	
August 24	"Magnetic"	Wage War	2	
September 7	"Pieces"	Daughtry	1	
September 14	"Judas Mind"	Seether	2	
September 28	"Can U See Me In the Dark?"	Halestorm and I Prevail	1	
October 5	"The Emptiness Machine"	Linkin Park	6	
November 16	"Suffocate City"	The Funeral Portrait featuring Spencer Charnas	1	
November 23	"Angel Song"	Nothing More featuring David Draiman	2	
December 7	"Liar"	Jelly Roll	1	
December 14	"Awaken"	Breaking Benjamin	4	
2025
January 11	"Mayday"†	Three Days Grace	5	
February 15	"Heavy Is the Crown"	Linkin Park	1	
February 22	"Stuck in My Head"	Sleep Theory	2	
March 8	"Bad Guy"	Falling in Reverse featuring Saraya	1	
March 15	"Dance, Kid, Dance"	Shinedown	1	
March 22	"Even If It Kills Me"	Papa Roach	3	
April 12	"I Will Not Break"	Disturbed	3	
May 3	"House on Sand"	Nothing More featuring Eric Vanlerberghe	1	
May 10	"I Will Not Break"	Disturbed	1	
May 17	"By a Monster's Hand"	Volbeat	2	
May 31	"Up from the Bottom"	Linkin Park	2	
June 14	"Holy Water"	The Funeral Portrait featuring Ivan Moody	3	
July 5	"Afterlife"	Evanescence	2	
July 19	"Apologies"	Three Days Grace	1	
July 26	"I Refuse"	Five Finger Death Punch featuring Maria Brink	1	
August 2	"The End"	Mammoth	1	
August 9	"Freefall"	Nothing More featuring Chris Daughtry	2	
August 23	"Static"	Sleep Theory	2	
September 6	"My Mind Is a Mountain"	Deftones	2	
September 20	"Killing Fields"	Shinedown	1	
September 27	"Everything Ends"	Architects	1	
October 4	"Braindead"	Papa Roach featuring Toby Morse	2	
October 18	"Specter"	Bad Omens	2	
November 1	"Time Will Heal"	Volbeat	1	
November 8	"For I Am Death"	The Pretty Reckless	2	
November 22	"The End"	Five Finger Death Punch featuring Babymetal	2	
December 6	"Asking for a Friend"	Foo Fighters	1	
December 13	"Kill Me Fast"	Three Days Grace	6	
2026
January 24	"Dark Thoughts"	The Funeral Portrait	2	
February 7	"The Spell"	Mammoth	1	
February 14	"Dying to Love"	Bad Omens	1	
February 21	"End of You"	Poppy, Amy Lee and Courtney LaPlante	1	
February 28	"The Bottom"	Daughtry	1	
March 7	"Searchlight"	Shinedown	2	
March 21	"Wake Up Calling"	Papa Roach	2	
April 4	"So Far So Fake"	Pierce the Veil	2	
April 18	"Wake Up Calling"	Papa Roach	1	
April 25	"Your Favorite Toy"	Foo Fighters	1	
May 2	"Demonic Depression"	Volbeat	1	
May 9	"Crawl Back to My Coffin"	Dayseeker	1	
May 16	"Drag Me"	From Ashes to New	2	
May 30	"Safe and Sound"	Shinedown	1	
June 6	"Words Are Worthless"	Sleep Theory	1	
June 13	"When I Wake Up"	The Pretty Reckless	1	
June 20	"Who Will You Follow"	Evanescence	2	
July 4	"Twisting the Knife"	Ice Nine Kills featuring Mckenna Grace	1	
July 11	"Eye of the Storm"	Five Finger Death Punch	3	
August 1	"Don't Wanna Go Home Tonight"	Three Days Grace	1	
August 8	"Something Wicked"	Breaking Benjamin	3	
August 29	"Broken Mirror"	Architects	1	
September 5	"Kerosene"	The Warning	1	
September 12	"Young Again"	Shinedown	2	
September 26	"Rattle the Cage"	Nickelback featuring John 5	1	
October 3	"Starless"	A Perfect Circle	2	
October 17	"Die for You"	From Ashes to New	2	
October 31	"Window"	Foo Fighters	1	
November 7	"R.I.P."	Motionless in White featuring Skylar Grey	2	
November 21	"Happy Feels Like"	Ninth Key	1	
