= Dark Thoughts =

Dark Thoughts may refer to:

- "Dark Thoughts" (Lil Tecca song), 2025
- "Dark Thoughts" (The Funeral Portrait song), 2023
- Dark Thoughts, an album by Skylar Grey, and the title track
