= Times Like These (Five Finger Death Punch song) =

2022 song by Five Finger Death Punch

Single by Five Finger Death Punch

from the album AfterLife
- Released: July 8, 2022
- Length: 3:29
- Label: Better Noise
- Songwriters: Ivan Moody; Zoltan Bathory; Charlie Engen; Chris Kael; Andy James; Kevin Churko
- Producers: Moody; Bathory; Engen; Kael; James; Churko

Five Finger Death Punch singles chronology
| "Welcome to the Circus" (2022) | "Times Like These" (2022) | "Judgment Day" (2023) |

Music video
- "Times Like These" on YouTube

"Times Like These" is a song by American heavy metal band Five Finger Death Punch. It was released on July 8, 2022, as a single from their ninth studio album AfterLife. It reached number one on the Billboard Mainstream Rock Airplay chart.

== Background and release ==
The song was released for streaming on July 8, 2022. It was the fourth track from the album, following "AfterLife", "IOU", and "Welcome to the Circus". On August 19, 2022, the official music video was released. The song was performed live for the first time when the band kicked off their national tour in Ridgefield, Washington.

== Composition and lyrics ==
The song is a melodic rock ballad featuring clean vocals from Ivan Moody and a blues-influenced instrumental section. Compared to the band's previous three songs, it has a slower pace and gentler instrumentation, with electric guitar patterns and acoustic guitar strumming. The track begins quietly and builds with a guitar solo. Andy James contributes a guitar solo beginning around 2:03.

It also includes synthetic beats that introduce pop elements, while the guitars have been described as progressive.

The lyrics have been described as melancholic, while Metal.de discussed loneliness and division within society in connection with the song. Loudwire noted that they seemed to fit the album's overall "existential mood".

== Track listing ==
All tracks are written by Five Finger Death Punch (Ivan Moody, Zoltan Bathory, Charlie Engen, Chris Kael, Andy James) and Kevin Churko.

"Times Like These" – by Five Finger Death Punch single
| No. | Title | Length |
|---|---|---|
| 1. | "Times Like These" | 3:29 |
| 2. | "Welcome To The Circus" (Explicit) | 4:16 |
| 3. | "IOU" (Explicit) | 4:27 |
| 4. | "AfterLife" (Explicit) | 4:03 |
| Total length: | | 16:17 |

== Chart performance ==
The song reached No. 9 on the Billboard Mainstream Rock Airplay chart on August 27, 2022. It then reached No. 1 on the chart dated October 1, 2022, becoming their thirteenth overall No. 1 and ninth consecutive No. 1 on the chart. The song also reached No. 1 on rock radio, where it remained for three weeks.

== Personnel ==
Credits adapted from Apple Music.

Five Finger Death Punch

- Ivan Moody – lead vocals, songwriter, producer
- Zoltan Bathory – guitar, songwriter, producer
- Charlie Engen – drums, songwriter, producer
- Chris Kael – bass guitar, songwriter, producer
- Andy James – guitar, songwriter, producer

Additional credit

- Kevin Churko – songwriter, producer, mixing engineer, engineer

== Charts ==
=== Weekly charts ===
Weekly chart performance for "Times Like These"
| Chart (2022) | Peak position |
|---|---|
| Canada Rock (Billboard) | 40 |
| US Hot Rock & Alternative Songs (Billboard) | 44 |
| US Rock & Alternative Airplay (Billboard) | 11 |
| US Mainstream Rock Airplay (Billboard) | 1 |

=== Year-end charts ===
Year-end chart performance for "Times Like These"
| Chart (2022) | Position |
|---|---|
| US Mainstream Rock Airplay (Billboard) | 31 |
