= Nevertel =

American band

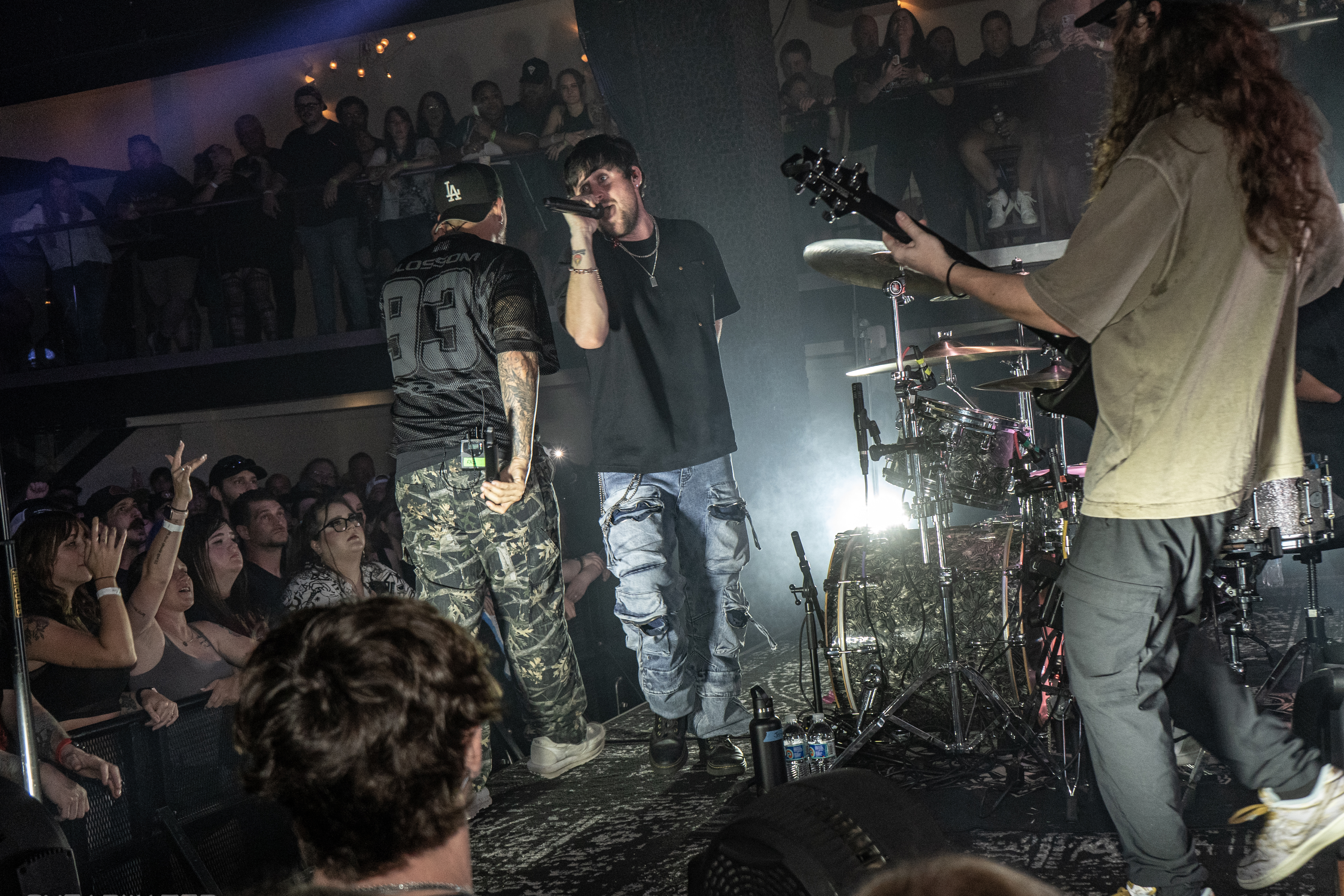
- Nevertel at The Regency Live - 9-21-25

Background information
- Origin: Tampa, Florida, U.S.
- Genres: Nu metal; metalcore; electronic rock
- Years active: 2014–present
- Label: Epitaph
- Members: Jeremy Michael; Raul Lopez
- Past members: Kyler Worley; Joshua Barter; Alec Davis
- Website: www.nevertelband.com

Nevertel is an American rock band from Tampa, Florida, formed in 2014. Their music is inspired by a variety of genres including metalcore, nu metal, hip-hop and EDM. The group consists of vocalist Jeremy Michael and guitarist/rapper Raul Lopez.

Nevertel formed in 2014, with the members all being friends from high school, and had played in prior bands together. The members had drifted apart after playing in these prior bands, until Raul Lopez had contacted Jeremey Michael and Alec Davis about starting their own band. They stated that what kept the band together was their love of music and video games from a young age until now. Nevertel has two albums, two EPs and a bunch of singles while having over 60 million worldwide streams. The band has performed at Welcome To Rockville, seen radio support from Sirius XM, and earned recognition across major digital service providers, with a position on Spotify’s All New Metal, Kickass Metal, and Hard Rock playlists.

== Band members ==
Current

- Jeremy Michael – vocals
- Raul Lopez – rap vocals, rhythm guitar

Touring

- Kevin Marks – drums

Former

- Alec Davis – lead guitar
- Kyler Worley
- Joshua Barter

== Discography ==
=== Albums ===
- Living Fiction (2016)
- Everything in My Mind (2021)
- Start Again (2025)

=== EPs ===
- Deep Down (2018)

=== Singles ===
Title	Year	Peaks			Album
Title	Year	US Air.	US Main. Rock	US Hard Rock	Album
"Losing Faith"	2024	—	40	—	Start Again
"Criminal"	2025	—	21	—	Start Again
"Break the Silence" (with Sleep Theory)	2025	20	3	18	Start Again
"Last Breath"	2026	—	28	—	TBA

=== Music videos ===
Title	Year	Director
"Stuck Inside"	2018	Cam Simon
"Down"	2019	Jeremy Michael
"All Good"	2019	Cam Simon
"Nice Try"	2020	Jeremy Michael
"Everything in My Mind"	2020	Unknown
"Back On Me"	2021	Cam Simon
"All I Need"	2021	Jeremy Michael
"New Friend"	2021	Cam Simon
"Feed the Machine" (Acoustic Version)	2023	Sebastian Clarke
"Sacrifice"	2024	Sebastian Chamberlain
"SYM (Shut Your Mouth)"	2024	Jake Johnston
"Losing Faith"	2024	Alex Kouvatsos
"Starting Over"	2025	Jake Johnston
"Criminal"	2025	Orie McGinness
"Some Things"	2025	Unknown
"Break the Silence"	2025	Orie McGinness
"Otherside"	2026	Unknown
"Last Breath"	2026	Alex Kouvatsos
