= Afterglow (Sleep Theory album) =

2025 studio album by Sleep Theory

Studio album by Sleep Theory
- Released: May 16, 2025
- Recorded: 2023–2024
- Genres: Alternative metal; hard rock; nu metal
- Length: 40:23
- Label: Epitaph
- Producer: David Cowell

Sleep Theory chronology
Paper Hearts (2023)	Afterglow (2025)

Singles from Afterglow
- 1. "Numb" Released: July 6, 2023; 2. "Fallout" Released: November 16, 2023; 3. "Stuck in My Head" Released: July 18, 2024; 4. "Static" Released: February 5, 2025; 5. "Gravity" Released: May 16, 2025; 6. "Words Are Worthless" Released: February 3, 2026

Professional ratings
Review scores
Source	Rating
AllMusic	4/5 stars
Blabbermouth.net	9/10
Kerrang!	4/5

Afterglow is the debut studio album by American rock band Sleep Theory, released on May 16, 2025, through Epitaph Records. The album peaked at number 117 on the US Billboard 200, and has sold 138,000 equivalent album units in the United States.

== Background ==
The band released the album's first single, titled "Stuck In My Head", on July 18, 2024. The second single, titled "Paralyzed", was released on October 25, 2024. On February 5, 2025, the band released the third single, titled "Static", along with the official announcement of the album. The fourth single off the album titled "III" was released on April 3, 2025. The band released a music video for the track "Gravity" on May 16, 2025, coinciding with the album release. The tracks "Numb" and "Fallout" originally appeared on the band's 2023 EP titled Paper Hearts.

== Track listing ==
All tracks are written by Cullen Moore, Daniel Pruitt, Paolo Vergara, Ben Pruitt, and David Cowell; additional writing on "Gravity" by Gabriella Khristine and on "Numb" by Tim Spencer.

Afterglow track listing
No.	Title	Length
1.	"Static"	3:29
2.	"Hourglass"	2:44
3.	"III"	3:03
4.	"Fallout"	3:18
5.	"Stuck in My Head"	3:17
6.	"Gravity"	3:53
7.	"Afterglow"	3:44
8.	"Numb"	3:35
9.	"Parasite"	3:15
10.	"Just a Mistake"	2:58
11.	"Paralyzed"	3:26
12.	"Words Are Worthless"	3:41
Total length:		40:23

== Personnel ==
Credits adapted from the album's liner notes.

=== Sleep Theory ===
- Cullen Moore – vocals
- Daniel Pruitt – guitar, unclean vocals
- Paolo Vergara – bass
- Ben Pruitt – drums

=== Additional contributors ===
- David Cowell – production, programming, additional instrumentation (all tracks); mixing (tracks 4, 8), string arrangements (7, 12)
- Zakk Cervini – mixing (1–3, 5–7, 9–12)
- Julian Gargiulo – mixing assistance (1–3, 5–7, 9–12)
- Ted Jensen – mastering
- Brandon Rodriguez – additional programming, guitar (9)
- Budapest Symphony Orchestra – strings (7, 12)
- Tim Spencer – additional vocals (8)
- Jim Hughes – artwork
- Eli Rae – layout
- RJ Vergara – logo
- Jonathan Weiner – photography

== Charts ==
Chart performance for Afterglow
Chart (2025)	Peak position
UK Albums Sales (OCC)	65
UK Independent Albums (OCC)	23
UK Rock & Metal Albums (OCC)	12
US Billboard 200	117
US Top Album Sales (Billboard)	9
US Top Rock & Alternative Albums (Billboard)	25
US Top Hard Rock Albums (Billboard)	6
