= Static (Sleep Theory song) =

2025 single by Sleep Theory

Single by Sleep Theory

from the album Afterglow
- Released: February 5, 2025
- Length: 3:29
- Label: Epitaph
- Songwriters: Cullen Moore; Daniel Pruitt; Paolo Vergara; Ben Pruitt; David Cowell
- Producer: Cowell

Sleep Theory singles chronology
"Paralyzed" (2024)	"Static" (2025)	"III" (2025)

Music video
- "Static" on YouTube

"Static" is a song by American rock band Sleep Theory. It is the third single and first track from their debut album, Afterglow. It reached No. 1 on the Billboard Mainstream Rock Airplay chart in August 2025.

== Background and release ==
"Static" was released alongside the announcement of Sleep Theory's debut album, Afterglow. The song is the opening track of the album and a music video was released concurrently with the announcement. The music video features the band performing in a neon-violet–lit club and was directed by Orie McGinness.

== Composition and lyrics ==
According to Revolver, the song combines four-on-the-floor dance-metal beats with nu-heavy hooks. Lead vocalist Cullen Moore sings in Auto-Tune-warped melodies about feeling overstimulated and unable to get away from the "static" in his mind. Guitarist Daniel Pruitt adds growls during the bridge, along with chromatic guitar parts, record scratches, and layers of synth effects. Wall of Sound wrote that the song starts with "murmurs and distorted chaos" before breaking into harsh screams, and noted that its funky beat adds some groove to what it called a "metalcore-esque foundation". Moore said that the band's growing schedule of interviews, shows, photoshoots and meet-and-greets created so much noise that "you can't turn it off".

== Reception ==
Wall of Sound called the chorus one of the year's most memorable and described the song as opening with "murmurs and distorted chaos" before erupting into harsh screams. Loudwire stated it's packed with pure adrenaline, from the primal screams to the electro-driving beats and "robotic vocals", noting that it features one of the longest-held screams that year. They also called it a standout from Afterglow. Anne Erickson of Blabbermouth wrote that the "crisp production" does not get in the way of the song's message, describing it as "brimming with emotional vocals, passionate screams and sky-high riffing". Melodic grouped "Static" with "III" and "Hourglass" as songs that pair Moore's "soulful vocals with Pruitt's aggression" while "balancing chaos and clarity". Melodic also wrote that the song gives Pruitt more opportunity to showcase his screaming, adding a raw, aggressive edge to the band's evolving sound while maintaining its soulful R&B rock roots.

== Track listing ==
All tracks are written by Cullen Moore, Daniel Pruitt, Paolo Vergara, Ben Pruitt, David Cowell.

"Static" – by Sleep Theory single
No.	Title	Length
1.	"Static"	3:29
2.	"Paralyzed"	3:26
3.	"Stuck In My Head"	3:17
Total length:		10:13

== Chart performance ==
It reached No. 1 on the Billboard Mainstream Rock Airplay chart on August 23, 2025, their second song to do so.

== Personnel ==
- Cullen Moore – clean vocals, songwriter
- Daniel Pruitt – guitar, unclean vocals, songwriter
- Paolo Vergara – bass, songwriter
- Ben Pruitt – drums, songwriter
- David Cowell – producer, songwriter

== Charts ==
=== Weekly charts ===
Weekly chart performance for "Static"
Chart (2025)	Peak position
US Hot Rock & Alternative Songs (Billboard)	46
US Rock & Alternative Airplay (Billboard)	20
US Mainstream Rock Airplay (Billboard)	1

=== Year-end charts ===
Year-end chart performance for "Static"
Chart (2025)	Position
US Mainstream Rock Airplay (Billboard)	14
