= Time Will Heal =

2025 song by Volbeat

Single by Volbeat

from the album God of Angels Trust
- Released: 16 May 2025
- Genre: Pop rock
- Length: 4:45
- Label: Vertigo; Universal
- Songwriter: Michael Poulsen
- Composers: Jon Larsen; Kaspar Boye Larsen
- Producers: Jacob Hansen; Poulsen

Volbeat singles chronology
"In the Barn of the Goat Giving Birth to Satan's Spawn in a Dying World of Doom" (2025)	"Time Will Heal" (2025)	"Demonic Depression" (2025)

Music video
- "Time Will Heal" on YouTube

"Time Will Heal" is a song by Danish rock band Volbeat. It was released as the third single from their ninth album, God of Angels Trust. It topped the Billboard Mainstream Rock Airplay chart in November 2025.

== Release and promotion ==
"Time Will Heal" was released as a single on May 16, 2025, prior to the release of God Of Angels Trust, and was accompanied by an official music video.

== Background ==
Vocalist and guitarist Michael Poulsen said that the song deals with the emotional ups and downs of life, noting the sudden changes in mood and the potential to learn from difficult experiences. Poulsen said he was still coping with the loss of his father and spoke about remaining confident that better days will come. He described it as an "intensely personal" track, inspired in part by his father's death. He said he experiences periods of coping as well as emotional low points, and stressed the importance of accepting difficult experiences rather than allowing them to dominate. Poulsen also noted the role of his children in helping him maintain perspective.

== Lyrics and themes ==
Lyrically, the song deals with grief and emotional ups and downs, and focuses on coping with difficult periods and having confidence that better days will come.

== Composition ==
Revolver noted that the song takes a more relaxed, yet still distortion-heavy approach than the preceding singles. The track has been described as a "mid-tempo" rock song by Metal Injection, and similarly described by Blabbermouth.net as a "mid-tempo anthem" that captures Volbeat's signature sound.

According to Poulsen, "Time Will Heal" is a signature Volbeat song among the band's more pop-rock songs.

== Critical reception ==
In a review of the album, Dave Everley of Louder Sound described "Time Will Heal" as an "arena-ready" anthem, while Angry Metal Guy described it as a "Weezer-like" track and characterized it as "sadboi metal". In another album review, Tim Bolitho-Jones of Distorted Sound magazine described the song as a chugging, catchy and melodious anthem, noting that it may appeal to fans of earlier Volbeat songs such as "Fallen", but called it a disappointing effort after the preceding track. Dom Lawson of Blabbermouth.net described the song as "straight-ahead" and "genuinely touching".

== Music video ==
The music video, directed by Julia Patey, features Volbeat performance footage and bloody surrealist allegory. The video contains a bloody staging in a room entirely bathed in red and a goat.

== Track listing ==
All tracks are written by Michael Poulsen.

Time Will Heal - by Volbeat Single
No.	Title	Length
1.	"Time Will Heal"	4:45
2.	"By a Monster's Hand"	3:42
3.	"In the Barn of the Goat Giving Birth to Satan's Spawn in a Dying World of Doom"	4:18
Total length:		12:46

== Personnel ==
Credits adapted from Apple Music.

Volbeat

- Michael Poulsen – lead vocals, guitar, songwriter, producer
- Jon Larsen – drums, composer
- Kaspar Boye Larsen – bass, composer

Additional credits

- Mia Maja – background vocals
- Jacob Hansen – producer, mastering engineer, mixing engineer

== Commercial performance ==
It reached No. 1 on the Billboard Mainstream Rock Airplay chart on November 1, 2025, their twelfth song to do so. This ties the band with Papa Roach for the 10th-most No. 1 hits since the chart began.

== Charts ==
Weekly chart performance for "Time Will Heal"
Chart (2025–2026)	Peak position
Austria Airplay (IFPI Austria)	15
Canada Mainstream Rock (Billboard)	15
Finland (Suomen virallinen lista)	50
Germany Airplay (TopHit)	30
US Rock & Alternative Airplay (Billboard)	8
US Mainstream Rock Airplay (Billboard)	1
