= Suffocate City =

2024 song by The Funeral Portrait

Single by The Funeral Portrait featuring Spencer Charnas

from the album Greetings from Suffocate City
- Released: June 21, 2024
- Length: 3:33
- Label: Better Noise
- Composers: Lee Jennings; Robert Weston; Brandon Umbanhowar; Cody Weissinger; Josh Landry; Johnny Andrews
- Producers: Landry; Andrews

The Funeral Portrait singles chronology
"Dark Thoughts" (2023)	"Suffocate City" (2024)	"Holy Water" (2025)

Music video
- "Suffocate City" on YouTube

"Suffocate City" is a song by American rock band The Funeral Portrait. It is the lead single from their second album, Greetings from Suffocate City, and features guest vocals from Ice Nine Kills frontman Spencer Charnas. It also reached number one on the Billboard Mainstream Rock Airplay chart in November 2024.

== Background and recording ==
The collaboration with Spencer Charnas began after The Funeral Portrait opened for Ice Nine Kills at Silver Scream Con. The Funeral Portrait frontman Lee Jennings said that following a strong fan response at the convention, Charnas expressed interest in working with the band. "Suffocate City" was chosen by Charnas as the track for collaboration following approximately six months of discussion.

The song was recorded remotely over Zoom during the COVID-19 pandemic, with each band member recording their parts separately and sending the files back and forth. Their original studio session was canceled due to the pandemic, so they turned to online collaboration to complete the song.

Jennings said that "Suffocate City" was planned from the beginning, with the band developing an idea for it. Collaborations with guest artists, including Charnas, were described as seamless, with Jennings stating the process allowed the band to try new sounds. Jennings described Charnas as "nothing but nice" and characterized the collaboration as "almost like a torch passing".

Charnas said he was "thrilled" to collaborate with the band on the song and said they also worked together on the accompanying music video. His vocals, described as fitting in perfectly with Jennings, appear around one minute and thirty seconds into the track.

== Release ==
The track had been under development for four years and was released digitally on June 21, 2024. It was the second preview from the band's forthcoming album at the time, following the track "You're So Ugly When You Cry". The music video was released alongside the single and was described as prom-themed by Rock Sound.

== Composition and themes ==
Jennings described "Suffocate City" as a mythical or "magical non-real place" where people can find a place to fit in and be together. He said the song deals with fear, particularly the feeling of being stuck in a dead-end job, relationship, or financial situation, and the fear of never being able to get out.

Blabbermouth.net described the song as featuring massive riffs and a driving chorus, evoking a sense of fear, while Rock Sound described it as "pummelling" and "explosive". New Noise Magazine described the song as "an all time favorite of many fans", calling it "wonderful" and "catchy". It opens with a mix of electric guitars and drums, with vocals beginning around fifteen seconds in. The chorus is said to capture the essence of the band. The review also noted that the song captures both Jennings' and Charnas' vocal styles. The track opens the album and begins with an industrial style, which was described as nostalgic of the 2000s while also sounding modern. The review said the instrumentals are reminiscent of My Chemical Romance and that the combination quickly draws the listener into the song.

== Music video ==
The music video shows the band performing at a school formal (prom) for a crowd of misfits and underwhelmed teens. Jennings said the band wanted choreography that they could afford, with friends and peers volunteering their time to help execute the creative idea.

== Track listing ==
"Suffocate City (feat. Spencer Charnas)" – by The Funeral Portrait single
No.	Title	Length
1.	"Suffocate City (feat. Spencer Charnas of Ice Nine Kills)"	3:33

== Commercial performance ==
"Suffocate City" reached No. 1 on the Billboard Mainstream Rock Airplay chart on November 16, 2024, their first song to do so. It is their first entry on any Billboard chart and their first No. 1 overall. The band is the third act in 2024 to achieve a first No. 1 on the Mainstream Rock Airplay chart as a lead act, and the first act to lead with a first charted track on any ranking since January 2022. Charnas also earns his first chart leader on a Billboard ranking with this song.

== Personnel ==
Credits adapted from Apple Music.

The Funeral Portrait

- Lee Jennings – lead vocals, composer
- Robert Weston – bass, composer
- Brandon Umbanhowar – drums, composer
- Cody Weissinger – guitar, composer
- Caleb Freihaut – guitar, keyboards

Additional musician

- Spencer Charnas – guest vocals

Additional credits

- Josh Landry - composer, producer
- Johnny Andrews – composer, producer

== Charts ==
=== Weekly charts ===
Weekly chart performance for "Suffocate City"
Chart (2024–2025)	Peak position
Canada Mainstream Rock (Billboard)	26
US Rock & Alternative Airplay (Billboard)	11
US Mainstream Rock Airplay (Billboard)	1

=== Year-end charts ===
Year-end chart performance for "Suffocate City"
Chart (2024)	Position
US Mainstream Rock Airplay (Billboard)	49

Chart (2025)	Position
Canada Mainstream Rock (Billboard)	65
