= Holy Water (The Funeral Portrait song) =

2025 song by The Funeral Portrait

Single by The Funeral Portrait featuring Ivan Moody

from the album Greetings from Suffocate City (deluxe edition)
- Released: February 28, 2025
- Length: 3:01
- Label: Better Noise
- Songwriters: Robert Weston; Joshua Landry
- Composers: Lee Jennings; Brandon Umbanhowar; Cody Weissinger; Johnny Andrews
- Producers: The Funeral Portrait; Landry; Andrews; Lee M. Rouse

The Funeral Portrait singles chronology
"Suffocate City" (2024)	"Holy Water" (2025)

"Holy Water" 2019 single artwork

Music video
- "Holy Water" on YouTube

"Holy Water" is a song by American rock band The Funeral Portrait. It is the second single from their second album, Greetings from Suffocate City, and features guest vocals from Five Finger Death Punch frontman Ivan Moody. It also reached number one on the Billboard Mainstream Rock Airplay chart in June 2025.

== Background and release ==
"Holy Water" is the fourth track on Greetings From Suffocate City and was previously released as a single in 2019. Frontman Lee Jennings said the song "did super well".

For the album's deluxe edition, the band released a new version featuring guest vocals from Ivan Moody. It was released on February 28, 2025, and was available as an instant-grat track with pre-orders of the album's deluxe edition. Moody said he was not too familiar with The Funeral Portrait's music prior to touring with them in 2024, but became "absolutely hooked" after watching them perform night after night. After hearing "Holy Water" on the radio, Moody contacted Jennings about the possibility of redoing the song. Moody was originally intended to appear on the album version of the track, but it did not work out because of timing. Jennings and Moody became friends while touring, and Moody later contributed vocals to a new version of the song. Jennings said that during a backstage conversation, Moody offered him advice and support. He said the experience felt "surreal", noting that Moody and Five Finger Death Punch were selling out arenas and headlining festivals, and described the collaboration as "another weird, life-changing moment". A music video for the song was subsequently released, and Jennings said that Moody's contribution "took it to another level" and that Moody was the "perfect voice to help tell this chapter".

== Composition and lyrics ==
Jennings said that "Holy Water" is one of his most personal and cathartic songs, about confronting dark moments and finding the strength to cleanse oneself of the weight they carry. He said the song has connected with fans, particularly during live performances.

== Reception ==
In a review for New Noise Magazine, Zee Caine described the song as a "classic" and a standout track, and noted that it had been played at the band's live shows for quite some time. In an August 2024 feature, Melodic magazine listed "Holy Water" among the band's "Top Tracks". In a September 8, 2024 review cited by Blabbermouth.net, MetalPlanetMusic described the song as having a "full-on arena anthem" sound and as "a real monster of a track".

== Music video ==
The music video was described by Jennings as "technically like a prequel to everything". In it, Jennings finds a box containing a voodoo doll, a crown of thorns, arrows, a feather, and a vial of blood, which he said were "the things that make the Icons who they are". Jennings interacts with The Priest, through whom Moody's voice is heard, and The Priest gives Jennings the power to control the Icons. The video's narrative was described as showing how Jennings gained the "power to ignite the souls of fans around the world". It is a gothic-style video filmed in the desert of Prescott, Arizona, and at an abandoned church in the Poconos, Pennsylvania. The Funeral Portrait's scenes were filmed on a day off between shows in Philadelphia and New York City, and the video was directed by Michael Lombardi of Better Noise Films. Jennings described filming the video as "absolutely insane" and said Moody's "energy and presence took everything to a whole new dimension".

== Track listing ==
"Holy Water" 2019 single
No.	Title	Length
1.	"Holy Water"	3:00

"Holy Water (featuring Ivan Moody of Five Finger Death Punch)" 2025 single
No.	Title	Length
1.	"Holy Water" (featuring Ivan Moody of Five Finger Death Punch)	3:01
2.	"Holy Water"	3:00
Total length:		6:01

== Chart performance ==
"Holy Water" debuted at number 21 on the Billboard Mainstream Rock Tracks chart. It then reached No. 1 on June 14, 2025, their second song to do so, and in as many charting entries. The song reached the top in its 18th week on the chart, one week faster than their previous No. 1.

== Personnel ==
Credits adapted from Apple Music.

The Funeral Portrait

- Lee Jennings – lead vocals, composer
- Robert Weston – bass, composer, songwriter
- Brandon Umbanhowar – drums, composer
- Cody Weissinger – guitar, composer
- Caleb Freihaut – guitar, keyboards

Additional musician

- Ivan Moody – guest vocals

Additional credits

- Joshua Landry – songwriter, producer
- Johnny Andrews – composer, producer
- The Funeral Portrait – producer
- Lee M. Rouse – producer

== Charts ==
=== Weekly charts ===
Weekly chart performance for "Holy Water"
Chart (2025)	Peak position
Canada Mainstream Rock (Billboard Canada)	33
US Rock & Alternative Airplay (Billboard)	8
US Mainstream Rock Airplay (Billboard)	1

=== Year-end charts ===
Year-end chart performance for "Holy Water"
Chart (2025)	Position
Canada Mainstream Rock (Billboard)	91
US Mainstream Rock Airplay (Billboard)	10
