= Back from the Dead (Halestorm album) =

Studio album by Halestorm
- Released: May 6, 2022
- Recorded: 2021
- Studios: Rock Falcon (Nashville, TN); The Barn (Springfield, TN); The Cabin (Los Angeles, CA)
- Genres: Hard rock; heavy metal
- Length: 37:41
- Label: Atlantic
- Producers: Nick Raskulinecz; Scott Stevens

Halestorm chronology
Vicious (2018)	Back from the Dead (2022)	Everest (2025)

Singles from Back from the Dead
- 1. "Back from the Dead" Released: August 18, 2021; 2. "The Steeple" Released: February 4, 2022; 3. "Wicked Ways / Mine" Released: July 16, 2022; 4. "Terrible Things" Released: May 24, 2023

Back from the Dead is the fifth studio album by American rock band Halestorm. It was released on May 6, 2022, through Atlantic Records. The album was preceded by its title track, "Back from the Dead", which was released as a single in August 2021, followed by "The Steeple" in February 2022.

== Background and production ==
Halestorm began working on their fifth studio album slightly before the beginning of the COVID-19 pandemic in 2020. During the lockdown period, the band was forced to cease their customary schedule of frequent touring while finding ways to financially support their staff and crew. The band began formal work on the album in early 2021.

Back From the Dead was the second time Halestorm worked with Nick Raskulinecz as their producer.

== Music and lyrics ==
Many of the album's lyrics are informed by singer/guitarist Lzzy Hale's experiences of self-discovery as a musician disconnected from fans and bandmates during the pandemic.

"This album is the story of me carving myself out of that abyss. It is a journey of navigating mental health, debauchery, survival, redemption, rediscovery, and still maintaining faith in humanity."

Hale has also shared that the song "Strange Girl" was intended to be an anthem for a teenage girl who had come out to her parents immediately before COVID. She was stuck with them due to lockdown despite them not being supportive, so she had conversations with Hale and other fans online.

== Critical reception ==
Professional ratings
Review scores
Source	Rating
Classic Rock	3.5/5 stars
Distorted Sound	10/10
Kerrang!	5/5
Melodic	5/5 stars
Metal Hammer	4/5 stars
Metal Injection	8/10
Riff Magazine	8/10
Upset	4/5 stars

The album received acclaim from critics. Wayne Parry of ABC News noted that "Hale manages to pull it off with a deft songwriting touch and a surprising sense of melody that belies the bombast." According to Steve Beebee of Kerrang!, "Lzzy Hale owns the best voice in modern rock – but even she's never sounded quite this enflamed" and called the album "the best 38 minutes of pure rock you've heard this year."

In the words of Chad Bowar of Metal Injection, "This album does a better job of getting closer to the energy and passion of the band's live shows than the last one [Vicious] did." According to Ed Ford of Rock N' Load, "If people wanted to know what the perfect rock album sounds like, give this a blast, you won't hear much better."

=== Accolades ===
Accolades for Back from the Dead
Publication	List	Rank
Metal Hammer	The Best Metal Albums of 2022 So Far	–

== Track listing ==
All tracks are written by Lzzy Hale and Scott Stevens, except where noted.

No.	Title	Writer(s)	Length
1.	"Back from the Dead"		3:30
2.	"Wicked Ways"		3:27
3.	"Strange Girl"		3:42
4.	"Brightside"		3:27
5.	"The Steeple"		3:27
6.	"Terrible Things"	Lzzy Hale, Zac Malloy, Scott Stevens	3:36
7.	"My Redemption"		3:33
8.	"Bombshell"	Hale, Joe Hottinger, Josh Smith, Arejay Hale	3:07
9.	"I Come First"		3:13
10.	"Psycho Crazy"		3:25
11.	"Raise Your Horns"		3:19
Total length:			37:41

Japanese edition bonus tracks
No.	Title	Length
12.	"Back from the Dead (Acoustic)"	3:39
13.	"Back from the Dead (Live)"	3:43
Total length:		45:14

Back from the Dead: Deluxe Edition
No.	Title	Length
12.	"Mine"	4:19
13.	"Heavy MeNtal (Fuck Yeah)"	3:00
14.	"Legendary"	3:28
15.	"Wannabe"	3:36
16.	"You Only Die Once"	3:39
17.	"Alien"	2:47
18.	"Special"	3:43
Total length:		62:12

== Personnel ==
Halestorm

- Lzzy Hale – vocals, guitar, piano, synthesizer
- Arejay Hale – drums, backing vocals
- Joe Hottinger – lead guitar, backing vocals, synthesizer
- Josh Smith – bass guitar, backing vocals, synthesizer

Additional personnel

- Scott Stevens – production (all tracks); engineering, digital editing (track 1); acoustic guitar, string arrangement (6)
- Nick Raskulinecz – production (all tracks), gang vocals (1)
- Ted Jensen – mastering
- Chris Lord-Alge – mixing
- Nathan Yarborough – engineering
- Nick Spezia – engineering (6)
- Rock Falcon – drum technician
- Calvin Roffey – guitar technician
- Tyler Dragness – guitar technician
- Adam Chagnon – additional engineering
- Brian Judd – mixing assistance
- Alan Umstead – concert master, violin (6)
- Craig Nelson – bass (6)
- Andrew Dunn – cello (6)
- Kevin Bate – cello (6)
- Ron Sorbo – percussion (6)
- Caroly Bailey – violin (6)
- Catherine Umstead – violin (6)
- Janet Darnall – violin (6)
- Jung-Min Shin – violin (6)
- Maria Conti – violin (6)
- Mary Kathryn Vanosdale – violin (6)
- Tiago Nunez – programming (8)

== Charts ==
Chart performance for Back from the Dead
Chart (2022)	Peak position
Australian Albums (ARIA)	90
Austrian Albums (Ö3 Austria)	24
Belgian Albums (Ultratop Flanders)	58
Belgian Albums (Ultratop Wallonia)	166
Canadian Albums (Billboard)	94
German Albums (Offizielle Top 100)	13
Hungarian Albums (MAHASZ)	12
Japanese Albums (Oricon)	34
Japanese Hot Albums (Billboard Japan)	62
New Zealand Albums (RMNZ)	29
Scottish Albums (Official Charts)	6
Swiss Albums (Schweizer Hitparade)	12
UK Albums (Official Charts)	9
UK Rock & Metal Albums (Official Charts)	1
US Billboard 200	36
US Top Hard Rock Albums (Billboard)	2
US Top Rock Albums (Billboard)	4
