= Blood in the Water (Ayron Jones song) =

2023 song by Ayron Jones

Single by Ayron Jones

from the album Chronicles of the Kid
- Released: March 17, 2023
- Length: 3:37
- Label: John Varvatos/Big Machine
- Songwriters: Ayron Jones; Scott Stevens; Marti Frederiksen; Blair Daly; Zac Maloy
- Producers: Stevens; Frederiksen; Scott Borchetta; John Varvatos

Ayron Jones singles chronology
"Filthy" (2022)	"Blood in the Water" (2023)

Music video
- "Blood in the Water" on YouTube

"Blood in the Water" is a single by American musician Ayron Jones from his fourth studio album, Chronicles of the Kid. It peaked at number one on the U.S. Billboard Mainstream Rock Airplay chart in September 2023.

== Release ==
"Blood in the Water" was released as a single with an accompanying music video in March 2023. It was the second single Jones had released in the preceding six months.

== Themes and lyrics ==
Jones said that "Blood in the Water" was his way of actively choosing to heal this trauma by creating new stories and identities for himself and his family members. He said that because he could not choose the life he had been given, he could choose to take control of the future and "break these curses now and forever". According to Loudwire, the song is about breaking generational curses, a theme Jones said he often heard about in church as a child. Mike DeWald of Riff Magazine wrote that the song stems from the generational trauma of parents Jones never really knew.

Tasha Brown of Distorted Sound noted that the lyrics refer to the death of Jones's mother, including the line "I didn't cry the day she died", and to a man Jones "never knew".

== Composition ==
Polly Glass of Classic Rock wrote that "Blood in the Water" begins with a clean, mournful guitar line that recalls Red Hot Chili Peppers' "Under the Bridge" before becoming "crushingly moody and epic". She wrote that Jones's singing comes through clearly in the song's choruses. Sam Williams of XS Noize wrote that the song begins with slow, moody guitars before building to an electrifying climax. Brown wrote that the song's verses are minimal, while the full band comes in during the choruses. She also noted that heavy screams appear in the closing moments of the track. Chad Childers of Loudwire described the track as an "emotionally charged, scorching bluesy rocker". DeWald wrote that "the pain" in "Blood in the Water" "emanates through" Jones's strained vocal cords. Monty Sewell of Rock N Load Magazine wrote that the song starts off "emotively" with Jones's "soulfully taunted vocals" before building to a "crescendo finish".

== Reception ==
American Songwriter described "Blood in the Water" as an "emotional song". Loudwire described the song as featuring emotionally charged blues and electrifying guitar playing, writing that it opens with vulnerability before building to an explosion of guitar playing.

== Track listing ==
"Blood in the Water" single
No.	Title	Length
1.	"Blood in the Water"	3:37

== Personnel ==
Credits adapted from Apple Music.

Performing artists

- Ayron Jones – vocals, guitar, backing vocals
- Marti Frederiksen – bass guitar
- Scott Stevens – guitar, programming
- Evan Frederiksen – drums

Production and engineering

- Scott Stevens – producer, recording engineer, mixing engineer
- Marti Frederiksen – producer, recording engineer
- Scott Borchetta – executive producer, producer
- John Varvatos – executive producer, producer
- Ted Jensen – mastering engineer

== Chart performance ==
"Blood in the Water" reached No. 1 on the Billboard Mainstream Rock Airplay chart dated September 16, 2023, becoming Jones's second No. 1 on the chart after "Mercy", which spent four weeks at the top beginning in June 2021.

=== Weekly charts ===
Weekly chart performance for "Blood in the Water"
Chart (2023)	Peak position
US Rock & Alternative Airplay (Billboard)	5
US Mainstream Rock Airplay (Billboard)	1

=== Year-end charts ===
Year-end chart performance for "Blood in the Water"
Chart (2023)	Position
US Rock & Alternative Airplay (Billboard)	45
US Mainstream Rock Airplay (Billboard)	13
