= AfterLife (album) =

Studio album by Five Finger Death Punch
- Released: August 19, 2022
- Recorded: 2021
- Genres: Alternative metal; groove metal
- Length: 47:09
- Label: Better Noise
- Producers: Five Finger Death Punch; Kevin Churko

Five Finger Death Punch chronology
F8 (2020)	AfterLife (2022)	Legacy (2026)

Singles from AfterLife
- 1. "AfterLife" Released: April 12, 2022; 2. "Welcome to the Circus" Released: June 10, 2022; 3. "Times Like These" Released: July 8, 2022; 4. "Judgment Day" Released: September 21, 2023; 5. "This Is the Way" Released: April 4, 2024

AfterLife is the ninth studio album by American heavy metal band Five Finger Death Punch, released on August 19, 2022, via Better Noise. It is the first album since 2007's The Way of the Fist not to feature longtime lead guitarist Jason Hook, who was replaced by Andy James in 2020.

Professional ratings
Review scores
Source	Rating
AllMusic	3/5 stars
Classic Rock	3/5 stars
Metal.de	7/10
Metal Hammer	3/5 stars
Ultimate Guitar	5.7/10
Wall of Sound	7.5/10

== Background ==
On November 29, 2021, Ivan Moody shared a new snippet of a song off of the upcoming album via Instagram, the video itself shows the frontman banging his head to a brand new song in the studio with producer Kevin Churko right in front of him, a few seconds later the video cuts out, noting that brand new music is in the works for the band. On April 12, 2022, the band officially released a brand new single off the album called "AfterLife", along with a tour announcement with Megadeth and The Hu as supporting acts. To promote the album, the band released a new song entitled "IOU", along with a lyric video and album details as well.

== Commercial performance ==
AfterLife debuted at number ten on the US Billboard 200 with 30,000 album-equivalent units. The album peaked in the top-10 in seven countries worldwide including the United States, and went number one in Finland and Switzerland. It also reached number one on the US Top Hard Rock Albums chart, making it the band's seventh number one album in that category, and the most number ones in that category in Billboard history. The album received mixed to positive reviews and has sold over 160,000 copies worldwide as of the end of 2022. As of May 2026, the album has sold 423,000 equivalent album units in the US.

The album consisted of well-charting singles. "AfterLife", the first single off the album, peaked number one on the Mainstream Rock chart, along with "Times Like These" and "Welcome to the Circus". "Welcome to the Circus" peaked number one on the Czech Republic Rock Songs chart as well.

== Singles ==
Year	Song	US Main.	CAN Rock	CZE Rock	HUN
2022	"AfterLife"	1	40	—	—
2022	"Welcome to the Circus"	1	49	1	21
2022	"Times Like These"	1	40	—	—
2024	"This Is the Way" (featuring DMX)"	1	—	—	—

== Track listing ==
All tracks are written by Five Finger Death Punch (mainly Zoltan Bathory and Ivan Moody) and Kevin Churko.

Standard and tour edition
No.	Title	Length
1.	"Welcome to the Circus"	4:17
2.	"AfterLife"	4:04
3.	"Times Like These"	3:30
4.	"Roll Dem Bones"	3:20
5.	"Pick Up Behind You"	3:09
6.	"Judgement Day"	4:53
7.	"IOU"	4:28
8.	"Thanks for Asking"	3:19
9.	"Blood and Tar"	3:23
10.	"All I Know"	5:12
11.	"Gold Gutter"	3:54
12.	"The End"	3:44
Total length:		47:09

Digital deluxe edition
No.	Title	Length
13.	"This Is the Way" (featuring DMX; mashup between DMX's "The Way It's Gonna Be" and 5FDP's "Judgment Day")	2:47
14.	"Judgment Day" (acoustic)	4:33
15.	"The End" (acoustic)	3:44
16.	"Thanks for Asking" (acoustic)	3:19

== Personnel ==
- Ivan Moody – lead vocals
- Zoltan Bathory – guitars
- Andy James – guitars
- Chris Kael – bass
- Charlie Engen – drums, percussion

Additional

- DMX – archive vocals on "This Is the Way"

Technical

- Five Finger Death Punch – production
- Kevin Churko – production, mixing, engineering
- Kane Churko – engineering
- Tristan Hardin – engineering, mastering

== Charts ==
Chart performance for AfterLife
Chart (2022)	Peak position
Australian Albums (ARIA)	6
Austrian Albums (Ö3 Austria)	3
Belgian Albums (Ultratop Flanders)	12
Belgian Albums (Ultratop Wallonia)	50
Canadian Albums (Billboard)	26
Dutch Albums (Album Top 100)	16
Finnish Albums (Suomen virallinen lista)	1
French Albums (SNEP)	66
German Albums (Offizielle Top 100)	3
Hungarian Albums (MAHASZ)	34
New Zealand Albums (RMNZ)	38
Norwegian Albums (VG-lista)	11
Polish Albums (ZPAV)	35
Scottish Albums (Official Charts)	9
Spanish Albums (Promusicae)	78
Swedish Albums (Sverigetopplistan)	12
Swedish Hard Rock Albums (Sverigetopplistan)	1
Swiss Albums (Schweizer Hitparade)	1
UK Albums (Official Charts)	19
UK Independent Albums (Official Charts)	2
UK Rock & Metal Albums (Official Charts)	1
US Billboard 200	10
US Top Hard Rock Albums (Billboard)	1
US Independent Albums (Billboard)	2
US Top Rock Albums (Billboard)	2
