= God of Angels Trust =

Studio album by Volbeat
- Released: 6 June 2025
- Recorded: October–November 2024
- Length: 44:10
- Label: Vertigo; Republic; Universal
- Producer: Jacob Hansen; Michael Poulsen

Volbeat chronology
Servant of the Mind (2021)	God of Angels Trust (2025)

Singles from God of Angels Trust
- 1. "By a Monster's Hand" Released: 6 March 2025; 2. "In the Barn of the Goat Giving Birth to Satan's Spawn in a Dying World of Doom" Released: 4 April 2025; 3. "Time Will Heal" Released: 15 May 2025; 4. "Demonic Depression" Released: 23 January 2026

God of Angels Trust is the ninth studio album by Danish rock band Volbeat. It was released on 6 June 2025 through Vertigo Records, Republic Records, and Universal Records. The album was preceded by the lead single "By a Monster's Hand" on 6 March 2025. It marks their first studio album following the departure of guitarist Rob Caggiano in June 2023.

== Background and recording ==
In June 2023, guitarist Rob Caggiano left the band after ten years, leaving the band as a trio. Poulsen then started writing on songs a year later, in the summer of 2024, following a year-long break to recover from throat surgery as well as his involvement with the band Asinhell. He would work on new material with drummer Jon Larsen and bassist Kaspar Boye Larsen for three weeks and arrange half of the album in just under a month. In fall 2024, the band entered the recording studio with longtime-producer Jacob Hansen. Poulsen's desire to work as quickly as possible followed through during the recording process, wanting to capture an "urgent and immediate" sound with "as few takes possible". The band played live in the studio and finished recording after only 13 days, making it the fastest record the band has ever created.

On God of Angels Trust, Volbeat intended to "abandon all songwriting rules" and break away from conventions to pursue new creative paths. Lead singer Michael Poulsen took a "more unconventional approach" to writing in order to break away from rules and structures. As a result, the album came out "forceful" with a "powerful combination" of catchy melodies and fresh energy.

== Promotion ==
The album was announced on 6 March 2025 alongside the release of the lead single "By a Monster's Hand" which showcases "driving guitars, a mid-paced intensity and anthemic vocal command" by Poulsen. Along with the news, Volbeat unveiled the "Greatest of All Tours Worldwide", a 70-date spanning world tour from 7 June to 13 November 2025. Tour dates in Canada consist of a co-headlining run with Three Days Grace and Wage War, followed by a series of headlining dates in the United States with special guests Halestorm and The Ghost Inside as well as Europe and the United Kingdom with special guests Bush and Gel. On 4 April 2025, the band released the album's second single, "In the Barn of the Goat Giving Birth to Satan's Spawn in a Dying World of Doom". The third single, "Time Will Heal", was released on 16 May 2025.

== Reception ==
Professional ratings
Review scores
Source	Rating
AllMusic	3.5/5 stars
Angry Metal Guy	3.5/5
Blabbermouth.net	8.5/10
Classic Rock	3.5/5 stars
Distorted Sound	7/10
Kerrang!	3/5

Dom Lawson of Blabbermouth.net called it "the heaviest and wildest Volbeat album to date." Tim Bolitho-Jones of Distorted Sound described it as being "slightly darker than its predecessors...[with themes focusing on] Satanic rites and serial killers [rather] than prohibition-era gangsters" and wrote "If you loved their last few releases and want more rump-shaking boogie metal to play...you’ll love this." Dave Everley of Classic Rock wrote, "God Of Angels Trust is a good album. Sometimes it’s a great one. But ultimately it’s another Volbeat album, nothing less but nothing more either."

== Track listing ==
All lyrics are written by Michael Poulsen.

God of Angels Trust track listing
No.	Title	Music	Length
1.	"Devils Are Awake"	Poulsen; Jon Larsen	4:54
2.	"By a Monster's Hand"	Poulsen	3:42
3.	"Acid Rain"	Poulsen	4:44
4.	"Demonic Depression"	Poulsen	3:58
5.	"In the Barn of the Goat Giving Birth to Satan's Spawn in a Dying World of Doom"	Poulsen	4:18
6.	"Time Will Heal"	Poulsen	4:45
7.	"Better Be Fueled Than Tamed"	Poulsen; Kaspar Boye Larsen	4:01
8.	"At the End of the Sirens"	Poulsen	5:14
9.	"Lonely Fields"	Poulsen; J. Larsen; K. Larsen	4:52
10.	"Enlighten the Disorder (By a Monster's Hand Part 2)"	Poulsen	3:42
Total length:			44:10

== Personnel ==
Credits adapted from Tidal.

=== Volbeat ===
- Michael Poulsen – vocals, guitars
- Kaspar Boye Larsen – bass
- Jon Larsen – drums

=== Additional contributors ===
- Michael Poulsen – production
- Jacob Hansen – production, mastering, mixing
- Tue Bayer – engineering
- Flemming C. Lund – lead guitar (tracks 1, 2, 4, 5, 7, 10)
- Mia Maja – background vocals (tracks 3, 4, 6, 9)
- Martin Pagaard Wolff – lead guitar (tracks 3, 5), acoustic guitar (3)

== Charts ==
=== Weekly charts ===
Weekly chart performance for God of Angels Trust
Chart (2025)	Peak position
Austrian Albums (Ö3 Austria)	1
Belgian Albums (Ultratop Flanders)	1
Belgian Albums (Ultratop Wallonia)	12
Canadian Albums (Billboard)	50
Danish Albums (Hitlisten)	4
Dutch Albums (Album Top 100)	1
Finnish Albums (Suomen virallinen lista)	3
French Albums (SNEP)	61
French Rock & Metal Albums (SNEP)	5
German Albums (Offizielle Top 100)	1
German Rock & Metal Albums (Offizielle Top 100)	1
Greek Albums (IFPI)	76
Hungarian Physical Albums (MAHASZ)	15
Norwegian Albums (IFPI Norge)	14
Polish Albums (ZPAV)	19
Scottish Albums (OCC)	5
Spanish Albums (Promusicae)	50
Swedish Albums (Sverigetopplistan)	3
Swedish Hard Rock Albums (Sverigetopplistan)	1
Swiss Albums (Schweizer Hitparade)	1
UK Albums (OCC)	24
UK Rock & Metal Albums (OCC)	2
US Billboard 200	78
US Top Rock & Alternative Albums (Billboard)	20

=== Year-end charts ===
Year-end chart performance for God of Angels Trust
Chart (2025)	Position
Austrian Albums (Ö3 Austria)	24
German Albums (Offizielle Top 100)	49
