= Welcome to the Circus =

2022 song by Five Finger Death Punch

Single by Five Finger Death Punch

from the album AfterLife
- Released: June 10, 2022
- Length: 4:16
- Label: Better Noise
- Songwriters: Ivan Moody; Zoltan Bathory; Charlie Engen; Chris Kael; Andy James; Kevin Churko
- Producers: Moody; Bathory; Engen; Kael; James; Churko

Five Finger Death Punch singles chronology
"AfterLife" (2022)	"Welcome to the Circus" (2022)	"Times Like These" (2022)

Music video
- "Welcome to the Circus" on YouTube

"Welcome to the Circus" is a song by American heavy metal band Five Finger Death Punch. It was released on June 10, 2022, as the second single from their ninth studio album, AfterLife. It became one of the band's number-one singles on the Billboard Mainstream Rock Airplay chart.

== Release ==
The song was released on June 10, 2022, with an accompanying lyric video, and was made available for streaming ahead of the album's release. It was the first and only song from AfterLife performed live by the band at the time of its release, debuting at the Welcome to Rockville festival in Daytona Beach.

== Composition and lyrics ==
"Welcome to the Circus" begins with melodies and laughter, before transitioning into guitar-driven sections and a vocal melody in the chorus. It has been described as unusual for the group while still remaining recognizable. The song has been described as featuring chugging riffs and gruff vocals, with lyrics that are "daft but insidiously catchy". It opens the album with what Ultimate Guitar described as "juvenile machismo and aggression".

== Critical reception ==
In an album review, the track was described as strong but noted for its familiar sound and recycled lyrics. Wall of Sound also stated that the song did not stand out.

== Track listing ==
All tracks are written by Five Finger Death Punch (Ivan Moody, Zoltan Bathory, Charlie Engen, Chris Kael, Andy James) and Kevin Churko.

"Welcome to the Circus" – by Five Finger Death Punch single
No.	Title	Length
1.	"Welcome To The Circus" (Explicit)	4:16
2.	"IOU" (Explicit)	4:27
3.	"AfterLife" (Explicit)	4:03
Total length:		12:47

== Chart performance ==
It reached No. 1 on the Billboard Mainstream Rock Airplay chart on March 4, 2023, their fourteenth song to reach the top. It became the band's tenth straight No. 1 on the chart, marking the longest run of consecutive chart-topping entries in the chart's history. It also reached No. 1 on the U.S. Active rock radio chart (Mediabase), becoming their fifteenth consecutive chart-topping single on that chart.

== Personnel ==
Credits adapted from Apple Music.

Five Finger Death Punch

- Ivan Moody – lead vocals, songwriter, producer
- Zoltan Bathory – guitar, songwriter, producer
- Charlie Engen – drums, songwriter, producer
- Chris Kael – bass guitar, songwriter, producer
- Andy James – guitar, songwriter, producer

Additional credit

- Kevin Churko – songwriter, producer, mixing engineer, engineer

== Charts ==
=== Weekly charts ===
Weekly chart performance for "Welcome to the Circus"
Chart (2022–2023)	Peak position
Canada Rock (Billboard)	49
Czech Republic Rock (IFPI)	1
Hungary (Single Top 40)	21
US Hot Rock & Alternative Songs (Billboard)	35
US Rock & Alternative Airplay (Billboard)	10
US Mainstream Rock Airplay (Billboard)	1

=== Year-end charts ===
Year-end chart performance for "Welcome to the Circus"
Chart (2023)	Position
US Rock & Alternative Airplay (Billboard)	48
US Mainstream Rock Airplay (Billboard)	23

== Certifications ==
Region	Certification	Certified units/sales
United States (RIAA)	Gold	500,000^{‡}
^{‡} Sales+streaming figures based on certification alone.
