= The Funeral Portrait =

American rock band

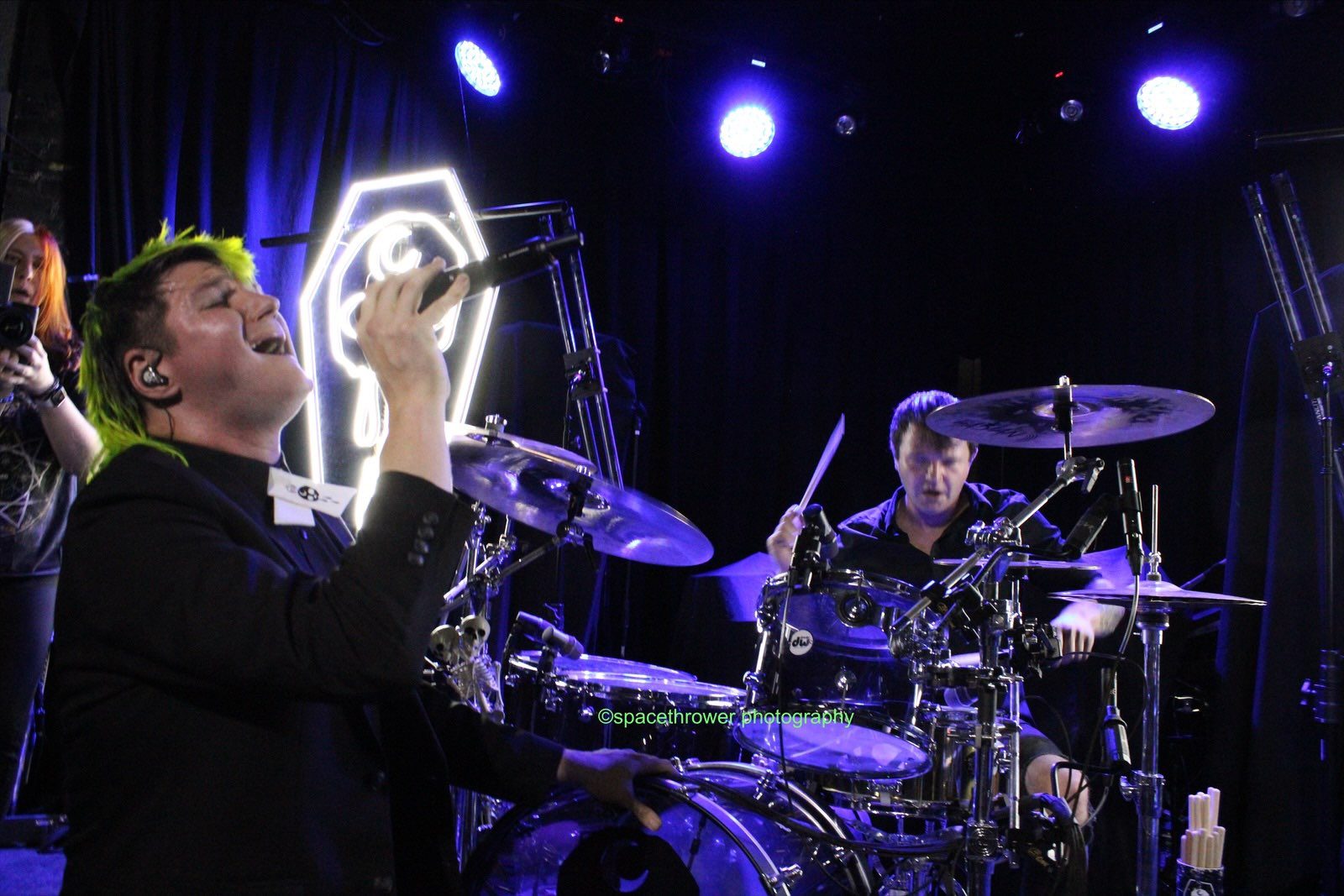
- Band members Lee Jennings and Homer Umbanhower, live in concert, September 2023

Background information
- Origin: Atlanta, Georgia
- Genres: Emo; post-hardcore; emo pop; alternative rock
- Years active: 2014–present
- Labels: Better Noise; Revival
- Members: Lee Jennings; Cody Weissinger; Robert Weston; Homer Umbanhower; Gareth Calk
- Past members: Caleb Freihaut; Stephen Danzey; AJ Pekarek; Jeurgie Landstrom; Mikey J; Chris King

The Funeral Portrait is an American rock band hailing from Atlanta, Georgia. The group formed in 2014 and currently consists of Lee Jennings (vocals), Cody Weissinger (lead guitar), Gareth Calk (rhythm guitar/auxiliary), Robert Weston (bass) and Homer Umbanhower (drums). Their musical style has been described as a blend of emotional hardcore, punk rock, and musical theater, with lead singer and frontman Lee Jennings comparing their sound on social media to a blend of bands such as My Chemical Romance, Ghost, and Motionless In White.

== History ==
Beginning under the moniker "Cosmoscope" in 2011, the band released an EP titled The Asteroid in 2012, a cover of NSYNC’s "It’s Gonna Be Me" in 2013 and an album titled "Hero or Menace" in the same year. The Funeral Portrait took their name from the Opeth song of the same name, from the 2001 album Blackwater Park.

Following the name change, the band released their first EP For the Dearly Departed in late 2014 and their subsequent LP A Moment of Silence in 2016, both under Revival Recordings: exploring, respectively, the stages of grief on the EP and what happens after you die on the LP. They have since been signed to Better Noise Music, releasing their EP Sounds from Beyond the Abyss, Vol. 1 in 2023 that includes both a cover of "Mad World" by Gary Jules and also their rendition of "Creep" by Radiohead, which was released as a single prior to the EP in partnership with the Hot Topic Foundation.

Several of their most recent hymns have debuted with music videos revealing "Icon" characters that have become representative of the band. "The Icons" include The Alien wearing a crown of thorns in the song "Alien," The Angel pierced with arrows in the song "Voodoo Doll," The Guide in the song "Dark Thoughts," The Night Terror in the song "Generation Psycho" and The Blood Mother in the song "Blood Mother"." The band featured Bert McCracken of The Used, Spencer Charnas of Ice Nine Kills and Ivan Moody of Five Finger Death Punch as featured performers on the tracks "You're So Ugly When You Cry", "Suffocate City", and "Holy Water" respectively, with Suffocate City becoming their first #1 Billboard-charting single on Mainstream Rock Airplay.

The group has played live shows alongside many notable artists, including Underoath, Starset, Escape the Fate and August Burns Red, as well as serving as the opening act for such bands as Shinedown, Skillet, Ice Nine Kills, PVRIS, and Issues. They performed as an opener for Five Finger Death Punch and Marilyn Manson on their 2024 North American summer tour. The Funeral Portrait's own live shows, nicknamed by the band and their fanbase as "Devotion Ceremonies," utilize intricately designed sets, stages, and characters ("The Icons"), with the band showcasing vibrant energy in their sound and enticing their audience visually with darkly theatrical aesthetics.

On January 11, 2026, rhythm guitarist Caleb Freihaut left the band to focus on his health.

== Musical style and themes ==
The band's lyrics touch on topics such as mental health, depression, love, and anger. In an interview with Technique magazine, frontman Lee Jennings elaborates on his lyrical approach, saying: "I think it’s important to have music that actually represents true feeling [...] There [are] a lot of people out there that I think it makes them feel better about themselves to know that they’re not the only ones struggling with something." In reference to their song "Suffocate City," Jennings further highlights his empathetic approach to lyricism, explaining on Blabbermouth that the song "speaks to our listeners' sense of fear: the fear of being stuck in a dead-end job, a dead-end relationship, or a dead-end financial situation. The fear of 'never getting out' is a ubiquitous experience that anyone can connect and relate to."

The band's members have stated that they aim to make their community a safe space for all marginalized groups, including the LGBTQ+ community; as frontman Lee Jennings details on The Jesea Lee Show podcast: "unlike The Funeral Portrait, many bands in their genre are afraid to speak out on behalf of the Queer community." Jennings and his bandmates actively interact with their fans, dubbed the "Coffin Crew", by using social media outlets such as Facebook, Instagram, TikTok, and their X account to share snippets of their life on tour: including stage photos, concert video, behind-the-scenes stories, and travel adventures. In one tweet, Jennings mentions that The Funeral Portrait is currently in its second phase, named TFP 2.0, revealing that up until 2019 the band served as a test run, since he was unsure if the project was his true calling in life. However, after seeing a rise in popularity and a cult following emerge, TFP 2.0 is now "turning it up to 11."

During live shows, band members Freihaut and Weston will regularly share a kiss on stage as part of their performance, a gesture aptly named "the kiss." Jennings took to X after a show to explain a confrontation he had with someone who shared their disdain for "the kiss," stating "people like this do not belong here and [...] it just makes us want to kiss even harder." In one particularly high-profile incident, the band was removed as an opening act from a well-known artist's tour because said artist (unnamed by the band) would not endorse "the kiss" portion of The Funeral Portrait's performance. However, in a show of further solidarity with the LGBTQ+ community, the band doubled down after the cancellation by releasing a t-shirt design in partnership with Hot Topic that says "I Love When Emo Boys Kiss."

== Band members ==
Current

- Lee Jennings – lead vocals (2014–present)
- Cody Weissinger – lead guitar, backing vocals (2018–present)
- Robert Weston – bass (2017–present)
- Homer Umbanhower – drums, percussion (2017–present)
- Gareth Calk – rhythm guitar, auxiliary, backing vocals (2026–present)

Former

- Caleb Freihaut – rhythm guitar, auxiliary, backing vocals (2019–2026)
- Stephen Danzey – drums, percussion (2014–2017)
- AJ Pekarek - guitar (2014–2017)
- Jeurgie Landstrom - guitar, backing vocals (2014–2017)
- Chris King – bass (2014–2017)
- Mikey J - guitar (2017-2019)

== Discography ==
=== Albums ===
- A Moment of Silence (2016)
- Greetings from Suffocate City (2024)

=== Extended plays ===
- For the Dearly Departed (2014)
- Sounds from Beyond the Abyss (Vol.1) (2023)
- Casanova (From Beyond the Abyss) (2024)
- Dark Thoughts (2025)

=== Singles ===
| Title | Year | Peak chart positions | | | Album |
| Title | Year | US Main. | US Hard Rock | US Air. | Album |
|---|---|---|---|---|---|
| "Dark Thoughts" (original or featuring Danny Worsnop) | 2023 | 1 | 17 | 13 | Greetings from Suffocate City |
| "Suffocate City" (featuring Spencer Charnas) | 2024 | 1 | 14 | 11 | Greetings from Suffocate City |
| "Holy Water" (original or featuring Ivan Moody) | 2025 | 1 | 14 | 8 | Greetings from Suffocate City |
| "My Future Prediction" | 2026 | — | — | — | TBA |

=== Promotional singles ===
| Title | Year | Album |
|---|---|---|
| "Voodoo Doll" (original or with Eva Under Fire) | 2022 | Greetings from Suffocate City |
| "Creep" | 2023 | Sounds From Beyond the Abyss (Vol. 1) |
| "You're So Ugly When You Cry" (featuring Bert McCracken) | 2024 | Greetings from Suffocate City |
| "Blood Mother" | 2024 | Greetings from Suffocate City |
| "Stay Weird" | 2024 | Greetings from Suffocate City |
| "Hearse for Two" (original or featuring Lilith Czar) | 2024 | Greetings from Suffocate City |
| "Evergreen" | 2024 | Greeting from Suffocate City (From Beyond the Abyss) |

=== As featured artist ===
| Title | Year | Album |
|---|---|---|
| "The End Is Where We Begin" (Thousand Foot Krutch featuring The Funeral Portrait) | 2024 | The End Is Where We Begin: Reignited |
| "Cemetery Friend" (Melrose Avenue featuring The Funeral Portrait) | 2026 | |

=== Music videos ===
| Song | Year | Director | Album | Link |
|---|---|---|---|---|
| "Casanova (C'est La Vie)" | 2015 | Justin Reich | For the Dearly Departed | |
| "Paper Mache Man" | 2019 | Aaron Marsh | Non-album single | |
| "Voodoo Doll" | 2022 | Aaron Marsh | Sounds From Beyond the Abyss (Vol. 1) /Greetings From Suffocate City | |
| "Mad World" | 2023 | James Gregory Wightman | Sounds From Beyond the Abyss (Vol. 1) | |
| "Alien" | 2023 | Alex Kouvatsos | Greetings From Suffocate City | |
| "Generation Psycho" | 2023 | James Gregory Wightman | Greetings From Suffocate City | |
| "Dark Thoughts" | 2023 | James Gregory Wightman | Greetings From Suffocate City | |
| "You're So Ugly When You Cry" | 2024 | James Gregory Wightman | Greetings From Suffocate City | |
| "Suffocate City" | 2024 | James Gregory Wightman | Greetings From Suffocate City | |
| "Blood Mother" | 2024 | James Gregory Wightman | Greetings From Suffocate City | |
| "Hearse for Two" | 2025 | James Gregory Wightman | Greetings From Suffocate City | |
| "Holy Water" | 2025 | Michael Lombardi | Greetings From Suffocate City | |
| "Evergreen" | 2025 | Unknown | Greeting from Suffocate City (From Beyond the Abyss) | |
