= Ayron Jones =

American musician

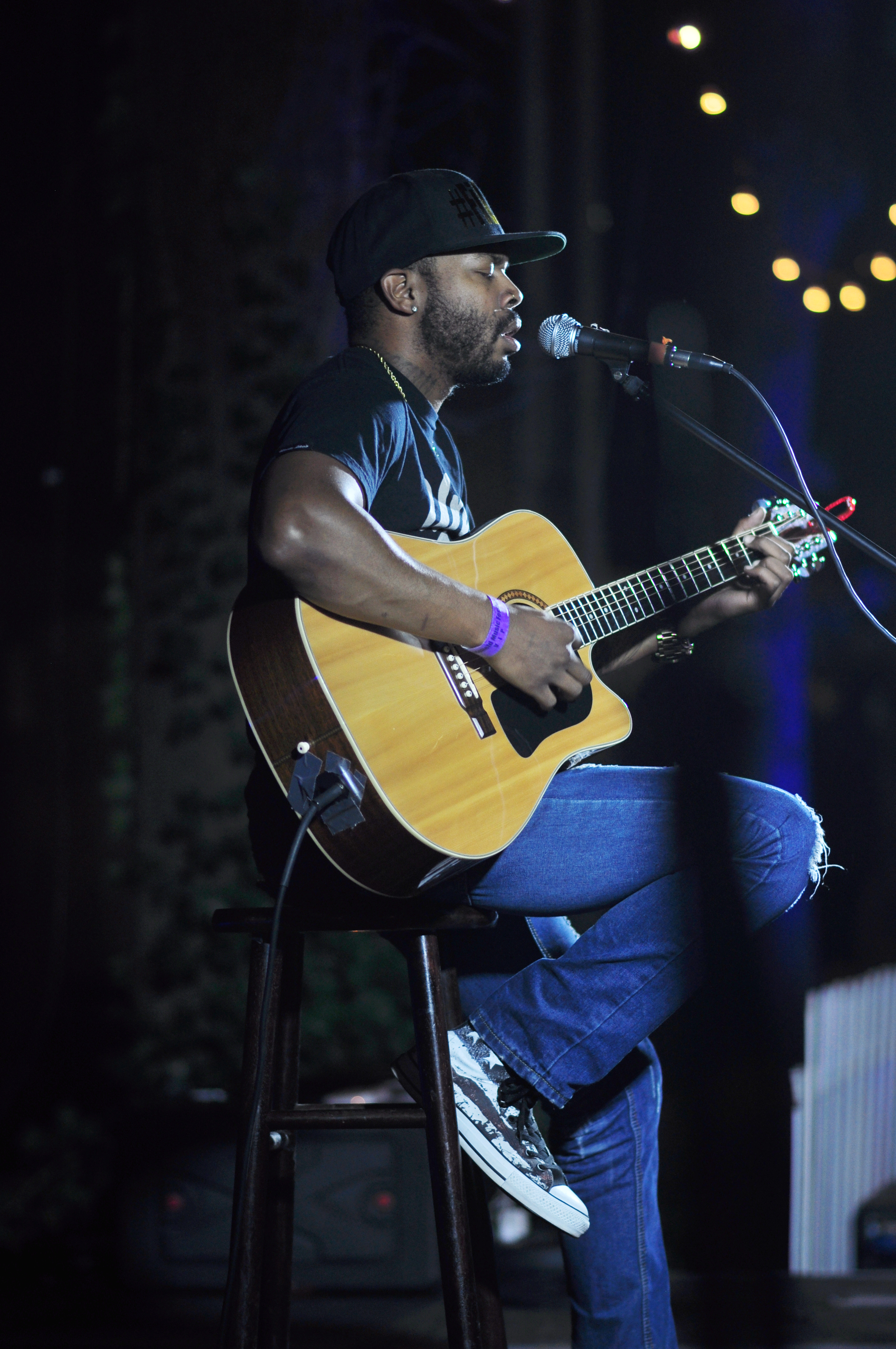
- Ayron Jones live at the 2015 Macefield Music Festival in Seattle

Background information
- Born: August 23, 1986 (age 40); Seattle, Washington, U.S.
- Genres: Blues; grunge; rock; soul
- Instruments: Vocals; guitar; bass
- Years active: 2005–present
- Labels: In De Goot; John Varvatos/Big Machine
- Website: ayronjonesmusic.com

Ayron Jones (born August 23, 1986) is an American guitarist, singer and songwriter. His music blends elements of grunge, rock, hip-hop, soul and other genres. After years performing in local venues of his hometown Seattle with his trio Ayron Jones and the Way, he was noticed by producer Sir Mix-a-Lot and led an independent career until he signed with John Varvatos/Big Machine. His first major album was released on May 21, 2021.

As an opening act or fellow participant in festivals, he has shared the stage with names such as B.B. King, Guns N' Roses, the Zombies, Patti Smith, Living Colour, The Presidents of the United States of America, Janelle Monae, Public Enemy, Rakim, Robin Trower, Spearhead, Train, Jeff Beck, Slipknot, Lamb of God, Theory of a Deadman, Run-DMC and The Rolling Stones, Judas Priest and Alice Cooper.

He has participated in festivals such as Download Festival, Bumbershoot, Mount Baker Rhythm and Blues Festival, SXSW, Sasquatch! Music Festival, KISW's Pain In The Grass, and Summer Meltdown, the Heavy Week End 2024 festival in Nancy in France.

== Early life ==
Ayron Jones was born at the University of Washington Medical Center to a 19-year-old mother and a father who "was never around". At the age of four, he was adopted by his aunt while his parents struggled with drug addiction.

As a religious person, his aunt surrounded him with soul and gospel music, which instilled a passion for music on him. Jones learned how to play the piano, the drums and the guitar alone and later chose the latter as his main instrument. He also took violin lessons at school, and despite saying that he was "terrible" at the instrument, he recognized that learning it helped him better understand music theory and allowed him to acquire some compositional skills. His first instrument was an acoustic guitar given to him by his mother for his birthday. Later, for his birthday, his aunt bought him a Squier Stratocaster. The first song he learned to play was Lenny Kravitz's "Fly Away".

At the age of 19, Jones started to perform at local bars. He would later recall being treated poorly in some places prior to performing, because he and his band "didn't look like the usual rock band". He also claims that police were called numerous times to intervene in his shows following noise complaints.

== Career ==
=== 2010–2017: Beginnings, Dream and Audio Paint Job ===
In 2010, he founded the trio Ayron Jones and the Way, inspired by important rock trios like Cream, Jimi Hendrix Experience, Stevie Ray Vaughan and Double Trouble and Prince and The Revolution. In 2012, while performing at a dive bar in Seattle, they were discovered by Sir Mix-a-Lot, who made it possible for them to record their debut, self-released album one year later. The effort was titled Dream and featured DeAndre Enrico on bass and Kai Van De Pitte on drums, with Mix-a-Lot producing it pro bono. The album was released on October 29, 2013, with a release show taking place a couple of days later, on November 2.

Following his debut, he was invited to work with Deep Cotton, but rejected an offer to tour extensively with them in order to focus on his solo career. In 2015, his two band members left the group and he decided to continue as a solo musician.

In early 2017, he signed with the Agency for the Performing Arts. Later that year, on June 2, he released his second album Audio Paint Job, which has been described as "autobiographical". Produced by Barrett Martin (who also performed on the record and distributed it via his own label Sunyata) and Jack Endino, it also featured the Way, at that time consisting of Bob Lovelace on bass and Ehssan Kirimi on drums, and some guests, such as Scarlet Parke on vocals, Andrew Joslyn on strings and Evan Flory-Barnes on the upright bass. The album release show took place on June 24 at the Neptune Theatre.

On November 2, 2017, he guest performed on the Levee Walkers's song "All Things Fade Away".

=== 2020–present: Major career, Child of the State ===
In 2020, he signed with Big Machine/John Varvatos and released his debut single "Take Me Away" in the middle of 2020. On October 5, 2020, a video shot in Seattle was released for the song, which discusses his abandonment as a child. The song was produced by Eric Lilavois at London Bridge Studio and featured Lovelace on bass, Joslyn on strings, Martin on drums and Parke on vocals.

On September 20, he performed "The Star-Spangled Banner" before an NFL game between the Seattle Seahawks and the New England Patriots.

In February 2021, he released his second single "Mercy" and its accompanying lyric video, discussing the 2020–2021 United States racial unrest. In the same month, the song was selected as one of the eight Classic Rock's "Tracks of the Week".

In April 2021, he was announced as one of the 25 artists from all the world selected by Fender to take part in the company's Fender Next project, a program that intends to assist the roster with marketing, gear and social media presence.

Also in April, he released his third single, "Spinning Circles", which discusses toxic relationships. It was also selected for another Classic Rock "Tracks of the Week" list released in April, and readers elected it as the second best of the eight.

His third album (the first via a major label), Child of the State, was released on May 21, 2021. In an interview for Loudwire, he said he would be playing the bass in some tracks. It featured the three singles among its tracks and it was elected by Loudwire as the 27th best rock/metal album of 2021.

In August 2022, he released his first single since Child of the State titled "Filthy".

== Musical style and influences ==
Ayron Jones's music is described as a mixture of blues, hip-hop, grunge, hard rock and soul. Jones himself once described his own sound as "like if Michael Jackson played guitar like Jimi Hendrix in Kurt Cobain's band".

Jones cites the beat as the most important aspect in his approach to songwriting and says he wants his sound to be representative of Seattle. When asked about the usage of noise in his music, he said that he had "developed this theory that what captivates people about an instrument or tone are the imperfections, because that’s the true reflection of human nature. [...] Your imperfections make you perfect."

Jones's playing style has been compared to Gary Clark Jr.'s and Stevie Ray Vaughan's and his singing style has been compared to Michael Jackson's.

He cites Hendrix, Freddie King, B.B. King, Roy Buchanan, Mike McCready, Kim Thayil and Cobain as guitar influences and Vaughan, Stevie Wonder, Dr. Dre, Rage Against the Machine, Nirvana, Soundgarden, Pearl Jam, Derek Trucks and Michael Jackson as general music influences.

== Personal life and other activities ==
Jones is married and has five children. Since 2017, he resides in Alki Beach, after living in the Central District until then.

Jones played for the same Ultimate Frisbee team as Sean Foreman (3OH!3) in the 2004 World Championship in Finland.

== Discography ==
=== Studio albums ===
- Dream (2013)
- Audio Paint Job (2017)
- Child of the State (2021)
- Chronicles of the Kid (2023)
- Excuse Me (2027)

=== Singles ===
Title	Year	Peak chart positions		Album
Title	Year	US Main.	US Hard Rock	Album
"Take Me Away"	2020	5	9	Child of the State
"Mercy"	2021	1	12	Child of the State
"Supercharged"	2021	2	15	Child of the State
"Hot Friends"	2022	27	—	Child of the State
"Filthy"	2022	18	—	Chronicles of the Kid
"Blood in the Water"	2023	1	23	Chronicles of the Kid
"Glad You Came"	2026	—	—	Excuse Me
"—" denotes a recording that did not chart or was not released in that territory.

=== As Featured Artist ===
Title	Album	Release date
"American Horse" (with Black Stone Cherry and John Cooper)	This Is Black Stone Cherry's RSD Album The Band Really Likes It	October 29, 2024

=== Music videos ===
Year	Title	Director	Album
2020	"Take Me Away"	Michael Rivera	Child of the State
2021	"Mercy"	Chris Berooty	Child of the State
2021	"Supercharged"	Steve Jawn	Child of the State
2022	"Filthy"	Keith Leman	Chronicles of the Kid
2022	"Otherside"	John Varvatos	Chronicles of the Kid
2023	"Blood In the Water"	John Varvatos	Chronicles of the Kid

== Awards and nominations ==
Year	Award	Category	Nominee(s)	Result	Ref.
2022	iHeartRadio Music Awards	Best New Rock Artist	Ayron Jones	Nominated	
