= This Is the Way (Five Finger Death Punch song) =

2024 song by Five Finger Death Punch

Single by Five Finger Death Punch featuring DMX

from the album AfterLife (deluxe edition)
- Released: April 4, 2024
- Genre: Rap rock
- Length: 2:47
- Label: Better Noise
- Songwriters: Ivan Moody; Zoltan Bathory; Earl Simmons; Kevin Churko; Pat Gallo
- Producers: Five Finger Death Punch; Churko

Five Finger Death Punch singles chronology
"Judgment Day" (2023)	"This Is the Way" (2024)	"I Refuse (2025 version)" (2025)

DMX singles chronology
"Kant Nobody" (2023)	"This Is the Way" (2024)	"Bring Out the Worst" (2025)

Music video
- "This Is the Way" on YouTube

"This Is the Way" is a song by American heavy metal band Five Finger Death Punch, featuring the late American rapper DMX. It was released on April 4, 2024, as a single from the digital deluxe edition of their ninth studio album, AfterLife. It reached number one on the Billboard Mainstream Rock Airplay and Hard Rock Digital Song Sales charts.

== Background and release ==
According to guitarist Zoltan Bathory, the band had discussed collaborating with DMX for several years. The song incorporates previously unreleased audio recordings by DMX. Bathory stated that everyone involved in the original recordings had to sign off on their use, and the track was held back from the original release of AfterLife. Bathory described the track as a salute to the rapper and a way to honor his memory. He also said the collaboration placed the song in radio and Spotify listings and other outlets where it would not normally appear, which he said could help attract listeners to hard rock and heavy metal.

The song was announced on January 12, 2024, as a bonus track included on the digital deluxe edition of AfterLife. The digital deluxe album was scheduled for release on February 9, 2024, with a music video for "This Is the Way" also planned for release. On February 7, 2024, it was announced that the deluxe album release, including the song, had been postponed to April 5, 2024.

== Composition ==
The track combines elements of DMX's 2009 song "The Way It's Gonna Be" and the band's earlier track "Judgement Day". Billboard described it as a "rocking" track, while Revolver called it "high-octane". MetalSucks characterized it as an "emotional" track about the struggles of daily life.

== Music video ==
The music video was directed by Hype Williams and released on April 5, 2024. The video features black-and-white performance footage of the band, along with memorial murals, cartoon images and photos of DMX.

== Track listing ==
"This Is The Way" (feat. DMX) – by Five Finger Death Punch single
No.	Title	Length
1.	"This Is The Way (feat. DMX)" (Explicit)	2:47

== Chart performance ==
The song debuted at No. 1 on the Billboard Hard Rock Digital Song Sales chart. It reached No. 1 on the Billboard Mainstream Rock Airplay chart on June 15, 2024, marking DMX's first No. 1 entry and his first appearance on a rock chart. It is their 11th consecutive No. 1 on the chart and their fifteenth overall. It also reached No. 1 on Active Rock radio.

== Personnel ==
Credits adapted from Apple Music.

Five Finger Death Punch

- Ivan Moody – lead vocals, songwriter
- Zoltan Bathory – guitar, songwriter
- Charlie Engen – drums
- Chris Kael – bass guitar
- Andy James – guitar

Additional credits

- DMX – vocals, sampled artist, songwriter
- Kevin Churko – songwriter, mixing engineer, recording engineer, co-producer, immersive mixing engineer
- Pat Gallo – songwriter
- Five Finger Death Punch – co-producer

== Charts ==
=== Weekly charts ===
Weekly chart performance for "This Is the Way"
Chart (2024)	Peak position
US Hot Rock & Alternative Songs (Billboard)	47
US Rock & Alternative Airplay (Billboard)	7
US Mainstream Rock Airplay (Billboard)	1

=== Year-end charts ===
Year-end chart performance for "This Is the Way"
Chart (2024)	Position
US Rock & Alternative Airplay (Billboard)	40
US Mainstream Rock Airplay (Billboard)	10
