= The Steeple (song) =

2022 song by Halestorm

Single by Halestorm

from the album Back from the Dead
- Released: February 4, 2022
- Genre: Hard rock
- Length: 3:27
- Label: Atlantic
- Songwriters: Lzzy Hale; Scott Stevens
- Producer: Nick Raskulinecz

Halestorm singles chronology
"Back from the Dead" (2021)	"The Steeple" (2022)	"Wicked Ways" (2022)

Music video
- "The Steeple" on YouTube

"The Steeple" is a song by American rock band Halestorm. It was released on February 4, 2022, as the second single from their fifth studio album, Back from the Dead. The song topped the Billboard Mainstream Rock Airplay chart in June 2022.

== Background and release ==
Songwriter and producer Scott Stevens said frontwoman Lzzy Hale wanted a song for the moment when she had "her audience in the palm of her hands". He described the idea as "a church of rock and roll anthem", and said that the pair completed the melody, lyrics and vocals within a few days. Hale said the band wrote "The Steeple" to re-create the "sanctuary" and sense of unity experienced at rock concerts. She added that the song was "a call to arms" and "a display of community".

The single was released on February 4, 2022. An acoustic version was released as a single on April 29, 2022.

== Composition and lyrics ==
"The Steeple" has been described as hard rock. Guitar.com noted that Joe Hottinger's lead guitar parts are played over Drop C rhythm guitars, while Hale told Guitar World that she played her Gibson Explorer Bird in the same tuning for "The Steeple".

Rolling Stone called it a "defiant redemption song" in which Hale "emerg[es] from the wilderness of pandemic isolation", and noted that the song's dramatic high point comes after Hottinger's solo, when Hale repeats the chorus a cappella. Jackson Maxwell of Guitar World wrote that Hale sings about reclaiming her "kingdom, cathedral and castle" after going through "hell", and that Hottinger's guitar solo bridges his metal and blues influences. Fraser Lewry of Classic Rock wrote that it features a chorus "custom-built" for the band's crowd singalongs.

Hale said the opening lyric, "It stopped raining in my head today", was inspired by a period of post-tour blues that lifted after Hottinger suggested they attend a concert together. She said the lyric was connected to the sense of community she feels at live rock shows, adding that she uses religious terminology to describe the communion created through music, calling it "the closest thing to magic that you'll find here on earth". American Songwriter wrote that the song is about rebirth after hardship and battling inner demons.

== Reception ==
Metal Hammer described "The Steeple" as a "rousing, metalhead call-to-arms" and an "outcast community statement". Jazmin L'Amy of Distorted Sound called it the album's "staple live anthem", while Metal Injection described it as a "rousing, uplifting song" that "should quickly become a live staple". Riff Magazine described the song as an "anthemic, fist-pumping rallying cry" for the band's fanbase and the "family of rock and roll". Steve Beebee of Kerrang! wrote that it is "a song made for crowds" and the stage. Classic Rock wrote that it brings together the album's recurring religious imagery in the depiction of a church "where God and the Devil call home".

== Track listing ==
All tracks are written by Lzzy Hale and Scott Stevens.

"The Steeple" single
No.	Title	Length
1.	"The Steeple"	3:27
2.	"Back from the Dead"	3:30
Total length:		6:57

"The Steeple (acoustic)" single
No.	Title	Length
1.	"The Steeple" (acoustic)	3:27
2.	"The Steeple"	3:27
Total length:		6:54

== Music video ==
The official music video premiered on the band's YouTube channel on February 22, 2022. It features the band alongside a group of backup dancers and focuses primarily on Hale before showing more of the band during the guitar solo. A lyric video was released on April 21, 2022.

== Chart performance ==
"The Steeple" reached number one on the Billboard Mainstream Rock Airplay chart dated June 4, 2022, becoming Halestorm's sixth song to top the chart and their second consecutive chart-topper.

== Personnel ==
Credits adapted from Apple Music.

Halestorm

- Lzzy Hale – lead vocals, rhythm guitar, synthesizer
- Arejay Hale – drums, backing vocals
- Joe Hottinger – lead guitar, backing vocals, synthesizer
- Josh Smith – bass, backing vocals, synthesizer

Production and engineering

- Nick Raskulinecz – producer
- Scott Stevens – co-producer
- Ted Jensen – mastering engineer
- Chris Lord-Alge – mixing engineer
- Brian Judd – assistant mixing engineer
- Nathan Yarborough – engineer
- Adam Chagnon – additional engineer

== Charts ==
=== Weekly charts ===
Weekly chart performance for "The Steeple"
Chart (2022)	Peak position
US Rock & Alternative Airplay (Billboard)	8
US Mainstream Rock Airplay (Billboard)	1

=== Year-end charts ===
Year-end chart performance for "The Steeple"
Chart (2022)	Position
US Rock & Alternative Airplay (Billboard)	43
US Mainstream Rock Airplay (Billboard)	18
