= Skeletons (Pop Evil song) =

2023 song by Pop Evil

- Skeletons (acoustic version) cover

Single by Pop Evil

from the album Skeletons
- Released: March 17, 2023
- Length: 3:29
- Label: MNRK Music
- Songwriters: Leigh Kakaty; Dave Bassett; Drew Fulk; KJ Strock
- Producer: Fulk

Pop Evil singles chronology
"Paranoid (Crash & Burn)" (2022)	"Skeletons" (2023)	"What Remains" (2024)

Music video
- "Skeletons" on YouTube

"Skeletons" is a song by American rock band Pop Evil. It was released as the third single from the band's seventh studio album of the same name, Skeletons. It reached No. 1 on the US Billboard Mainstream Rock Airplay chart in November 2023.

== Background ==
Speaking about the song, Pop Evil said that people's decisions affect those around them and that they can choose to be kind or selfish, adding that thinking only of oneself can lead to being alone.

== Composition and reception ==
Tasha Brown of Distorted Sound noted that the track features a slower instrumental passage and a fuller second verse with a buzzing bass line. She also described it as very catchy. Brown said the song was written around the idea of becoming saturated by negativity in the current climate. She described people as becoming "lonely skeletons" who isolate themselves within their misery.

Jannik Kleemann of Metal.de described the track as rather average, while Frank Thießies of Metal Hammer Germany described the track's roots-rock approach as stale and said it was tailored to a more rustic redneck audience.

== Music video ==
The video was directed by Johan Carlèn and depicts a supply run in the wastelands of a dystopian future that goes wrong. A man faces death in a fight between humans and machines.

== Track listing ==
"Skeletons (acoustic version)" single
No.	Title	Length
1.	"Skeletons" (acoustic version)	3:33
2.	"Skeletons"	3:29
Total length:		7:03

== Personnel ==
Credits adapted from Apple Music.

Pop Evil

- Leigh Kakaty – lead vocals
- Nick Fuelling – guitar
- Dave Grahs – guitar, backing vocals
- Joey Walser – bass
- Hayley Cramer – drums

Additional contributors

- Drew Fulk – production, mixing
- Jeff Dunne – mixing
- Paul Logus – mastering

== Chart performance ==
"Skeletons" reached No. 1 on the Billboard Mainstream Rock Airplay chart dated November 11, 2023. It was Pop Evil's eighth No. 1 on the chart and its first since "Survivor" reached the top in October 2021.

=== Weekly charts ===
Weekly chart performance for "Skeletons"
Chart (2023)	Peak position
Canada Rock (Billboard)	49
US Rock & Alternative Airplay (Billboard)	13
US Mainstream Rock Airplay (Billboard)	1

=== Year-end charts ===
Year-end chart performance for "Skeletons"
Chart (2023)	Position
US Mainstream Rock Airplay (Billboard)	29
