= Back from the Dead (song) =

2021 song by Halestorm

Single by Halestorm

from the album Back from the Dead
- Released: August 18, 2021
- Genre: Hard rock; arena rock
- Length: 3:29
- Label: Atlantic
- Songwriters: Lzzy Hale; Scott Stevens
- Producer: Nick Raskulinecz

Halestorm singles chronology
| "Long Live Rock" (2021) | "Back from the Dead" (2021) | "The Steeple" (2022) |

Back from the Dead (unplugged) single

Music video
- "Back from the Dead" on YouTube

"Back from the Dead" is a song by American rock band Halestorm. It was released on August 18, 2021, as the first single from their fifth studio album of the same name. The song topped the Billboard Mainstream Rock chart in November 2021.

== Background and release ==
After revisiting several pre-pandemic demos, frontwoman Lzzy Hale and guitarist Joe Hottinger decided those songs no longer fit the atmosphere of 2020 and instead started over, writing "Back from the Dead". Hale said the song "perfectly captures this moment" and that the band wrote it "because we had to stay sane". According to Hale, the song was written from a mental health perspective and was intended to be "a hard rock song we could shout out loud as the gates opened again". She described it as being about survival "not in a physical sense" and hoped it would remind listeners of their individual strength and that they were not alone. Hale later characterized the track as a "reintroduction", saying the band wanted a song that simply said, "Hey, we're back". In an interview with Consequence, Hale described the title as representing survival and said she wanted to "keep moving forward". She added that listeners' response to the song validated the feelings she expressed while writing it because many others shared them. Discussing the song's lyrics, Hale initially called the idea for "Back from the Dead" "dumb", but later said it "totally works". Speaking to Metal Hammer for the album's track-by-track guide, Hottinger said he re-recorded the song's guitar solo after hearing the completed mix on his phone and deciding to redo it. In a separate Metal Hammer interview, Hottinger said the band had written several songs for the album but felt they had not yet found "that thing" until Hale showed them "Back from the Dead", which Hale said was "exactly what we wanted to say".

On August 16, 2021, Halestorm announced that "Back from the Dead" would be released as a single on August 18. The band teased the song by sharing a 25-second audio snippet on social media. The single marked their first new music since the release of their 2018 album, Vicious. An unplugged version was released on November 3, 2021.

== Composition ==
The song has been described as hard rock and arena rock. Jazmin L'Amy of Distorted Sound noted its down-tuned guitars.

== Reception ==
Joseph Hudak of Rolling Stone called "Back from the Dead" "a biting but cathartic howler about overcoming all obstacles – even death". Classic Rock called it "a typically fierce anthem" and "a booming, diabolical, flame-grilled beast of a tune". Steve Beebee of Kerrang! called it "purging, anthemic". Melodic noted Hale's "thundering" vocals on the track, while Kelsey McClure of Upset praised Hale's "powerful" voice.

== Music video ==
According to Hale, director Dustin Haney challenged the band to work outside of their comfort zones during filming. She described the finished video as "dark, dirty, cinematic and beautiful". Promotional stills released ahead of the video's premiere showed Hale in a body bag, shadowy figures in a graveyard, and what appeared to be tools in a morgue.

The music video, produced by Revolution Pictures, depicts a bloodied Hale being transported through a hospital on a gurney while the other band members appear dead in an open field. It also shows Hale singing underwater, through an oxygen mask, and fighting her way out of a body bag, while the band members emerge from body bags and gravesites, are laid out on coroner's tables in a morgue, and later walk through a graveyard.

== Track listing ==
"Back from the Dead" single
| No. | Title | Length |
|---|---|---|
| 1. | "Back from the Dead" | 3:29 |

"Back from the Dead (unplugged)" single
| No. | Title | Length |
|---|---|---|
| 1. | "Back from the Dead" (unplugged) | 3:36 |
| 2. | "Back from the Dead" | 3:30 |
| Total length: | | 7:07 |

Notes

- Apple Music only lists track 1 for unplugged single.

== Live performances ==
Halestorm performed "Back from the Dead" live for the first time on August 31, 2021, at the Great New York State Fair in Syracuse, New York, as part of the Chevrolet Music Festival.

== Chart performance ==
"Back from the Dead" reached number one on the Billboard Mainstream Rock Airplay chart dated November 6, 2021. It became Halestorm's fifth number-one song on the chart and their first since "Uncomfortable" in 2018.

== Personnel ==
Credits adapted from Apple Music.

Halestorm

- Lzzy Hale – lead vocals, rhythm guitar, synthesiser
- Arejay Hale – drums, backing vocals
- Joe Hottinger – lead guitar, backing vocals, synthesiser
- Josh Smith – bass, backing vocals, synthesiser

Production and engineering

- Nick Raskulinecz – producer
- Scott Stevens – co-producer
- Ted Jensen – mastering engineer
- Chris Lord-Alge – mixing engineer
- Brian Judd – assistant mixing engineer
- Nathan Yarborough – engineer
- Adam Chagnon – additional engineer

== Charts ==
=== Weekly charts ===
Weekly chart performance for "Back from the Dead"
| Chart (2021) | Peak position |
|---|---|
| Canada Rock (Billboard) | 42 |
| US Rock & Alternative Airplay (Billboard) | 9 |
| US Mainstream Rock Airplay (Billboard) | 1 |

=== Year-end charts ===
Year-end chart performance for "Back from the Dead"
| Chart (2021) | Position |
|---|---|
| US Mainstream Rock Airplay (Billboard) | 45 |
