= Lowest in Me =

2023 single by Staind

Single by Staind

from the album Confessions of the Fallen
- Released: April 19, 2023
- Genre: Post-grunge
- Length: 3:07
- Label: Alchemy; BMG
- Songwriters: Johnny April; Aaron Lewis; Matt McGinn; Mike Mushok; Erik Ron
- Producer: Erik Ron

Staind singles chronology
"Something to Remind You" (2012)	"Lowest in Me" (2023)	"Here and Now" (2023)

Music video
- "Lowest in Me" on YouTube

"Lowest in Me" is a song by American rock band Staind. The song was released on April 19, 2023, as the lead single from their eighth studio album Confessions of the Fallen. It was co-written by Aaron Lewis, Mike Mushok, Johnny April, Matt McGinn, and producer Erik Ron.

"Lowest in Me" is the band's first new song in 12 years.

== Background ==
"Lowest in Me" was released on April 19, 2023, as the lead single to Staind's first album in 12 years, Confessions of the Fallen. Frontman Aaron Lewis stated that the song was an attempt to "modernize" the band's usual post-grunge sound.

Guitarist Mike Mushok came up with the guitar riff in 2019.

== Critical reception and commercial performance ==
Lauryn Schaffner of Loudwire described the song as a "hard-hitting track" and said that Lewis sounded "energized and fresh".

"Lowest in Me" became Staind's fifth number one song on the Billboard Mainstream Rock Airplay chart.

== Music video ==
The music video was released on May 31, 2023, and was directed by Djay Brawner. The video mixes clips of Lewis singing with footage following the protagonist living through a nightmare.

== Personnel ==
Credits adapted from Tidal.

- Aaron Lewis – lead vocals
- Johnny April – bass
- Mike Mushok – electric guitar
- Sal Giancarelli – drums
- Erik Ron – production, mixing
- Anthony Reeder – recording

== Charts ==
Chart performance for "Lowest in Me"
Chart (2023)	Peak position
US Alternative Airplay (Billboard)	40
US Hot Hard Rock Songs (Billboard)	3
US Mainstream Rock (Billboard)	1
