= Sleep Theory =

American rock band

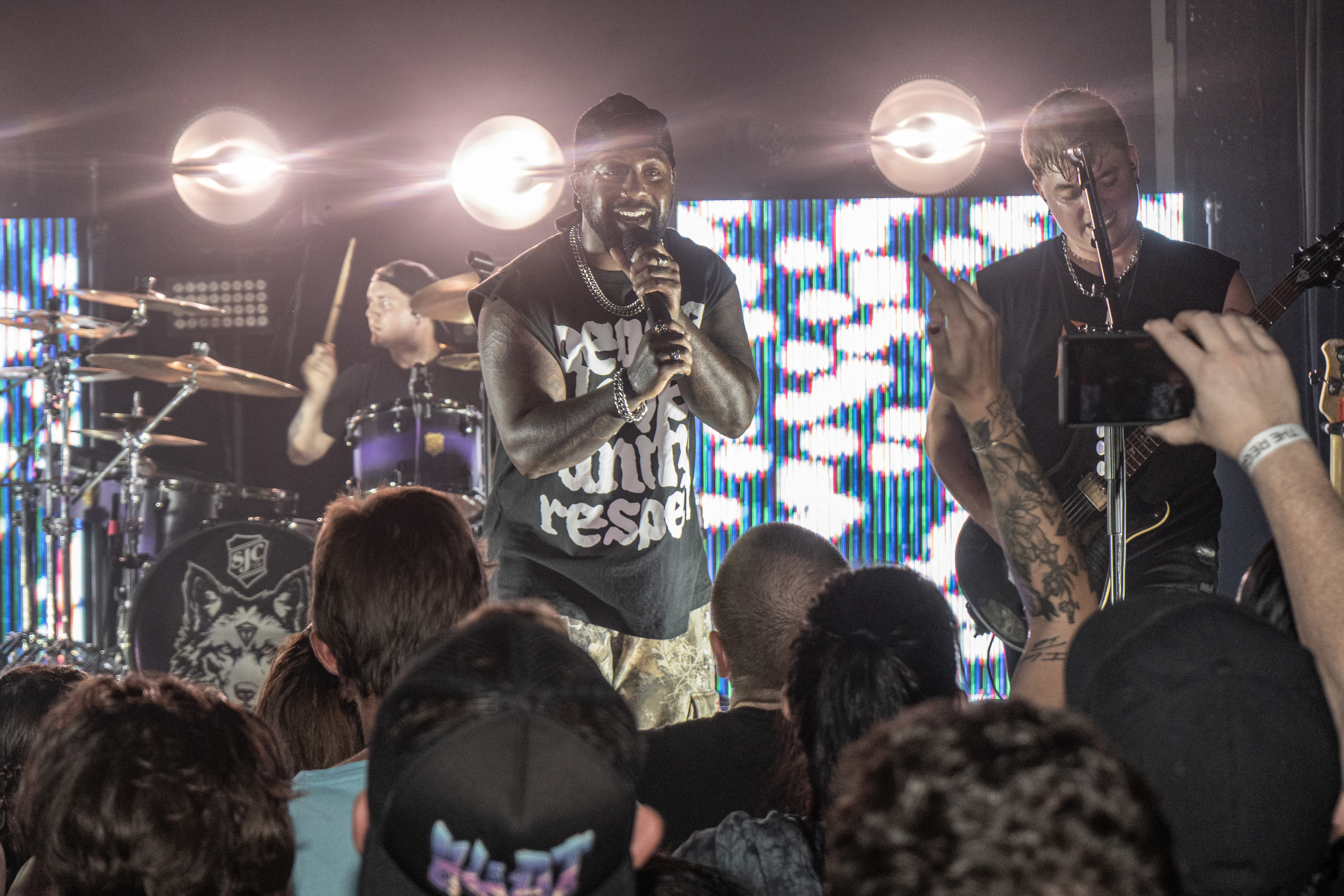
- Sleep Theory at The Regency Live - 9-21-25

Background information
- Origin: Memphis, Tennessee, U.S.
- Genres: Alternative metal; hard rock
- Years active: 2019–present
- Label: Epitaph
- Members: Cullen Moore; Daniel Pruitt; Paolo Vergara; Ben Pruitt
- Past members: Landen Terry; Alex Washam
- Website: sleeptheoryofficial.com

Sleep Theory is an American rock band from Memphis, Tennessee. They formed in 2019 and consist of vocalist Cullen Moore, guitarist/unclean vocalist Daniel Pruitt, bassist Paolo Vergara, and drummer Ben Pruitt. The band began as a solo project of Moore's, a US Army veteran, who was then joined by Vergara. The band blends styles of heavy metal and R&B. They released their debut EP, Paper Hearts, in 2023, which was preceded by the singles "Another Way" and "Numb". The EP generated over 33 million streams in the next few months.

On February 5, 2025, they announced that their debut album, titled Afterglow; the album was released on May 16, 2025. They went on tour in the U.S. in August–December 2025 to support the album along with Falling in Reverse, Nevertel, Oxymorrons, Strayview, Papa Roach and The Used. They announced a 2026 EU and UK tour, which will begin in February 2026 with supporting act The Pretty Wild.

In February 2026, the band was announced as part of the lineup for the Louder Than Life music festival in Louisville, scheduled to take place in September.

Sleep Theory have cited influences including Linkin Park, Bring Me the Horizon, Issues, Bad Omens, Beartooth, Saosin and Michael Jackson.

== Band members ==
Current

- Cullen Moore – clean vocals, harmonica (2019–present), unclean vocals (2019–2023)
- Paolo Vergara – bass, backing vocals, occasional lead vocals (2019–present)
- Ben Pruitt – drums (2022–present)
- Daniel Pruitt – guitar, unclean vocals (2023–present)

Former

- Landen Terry – guitar (2019–2023)
- Alex Washam – drums (2020–2022)

== Discography ==
=== Albums ===
- Afterglow (2025) – No. 117 US Billboard 200

=== EPs ===
- Paper Hearts (2023)
- (E)motional (S)upport (C)are (P)ackage (2026)
- Paper Hearts (Reimagined) (2026)

=== Singles ===
==== As lead artist ====
Title	Year	Peak chart positions								Album
Title	Year	US Alt.	US Hard Rock	US Hard Rock Digi.	US Main.	US Air.	US Adult Pop	US Rock/ Alt.	CAN Main. Rock	Album
"Another Way"	2023	―	—	—	—	—	—	—	—	Paper Hearts
"Numb"	2023	—	14	—	9	24	—	—	—	Paper Hearts/Afterglow
"Gone or Staying"	2023	—	—	—	—	—	—	—	—	Paper Hearts
"Fallout"	2024	—	6	—	2	14	—	—	—	Paper Hearts/Afterglow
"Stuck in My Head"	2024	31	5	6	1	11	—	—	—	Afterglow
"Paralyzed"	2024	—	15	—	—	—	—	—	—	Afterglow
"Static"	2025	—	5	3	1	20	—	46	—	Afterglow
"III"	2025	—	17	—	—	—	—	—	—	Afterglow
"Gravity"	2025	35	16	—	—	—	—	—	—	Afterglow
"Words Are Worthless"	2026	27	3	—	1	8	25	—	30	Afterglow
"Bye Bye Bye" (*NSYNC cover)	2026	—	7	—	—	—	—	—	—	(E)motional (S)upport (C)are (P)ackage
"My Heart" (Paramore cover)	2026	—	16	—	—	—	—	—	—	(E)motional (S)upport (C)are (P)ackage
"Cruel Summer" (Taylor Swift cover)	2026	—	24	—	—	—	—	—	—	(E)motional (S)upport (C)are (P)ackage
"Giving In"	2026	—	8	—	26	—	—	—	—	TBA
"—" denotes a recording that did not chart or was not released in that territory.

==== As featured artist ====
Title	Year	Peak chart positions			Album
Title	Year	US Air.	US Hard Rock	US Main.	Album
"Break the Silence" (with Nevertel)	2025	20	18	3	Start Again

=== Music videos ===
Title	Year	Director	Album
"Numb" (Reimagined)	2023	Sleep Theory	Non-album single
"Numb"	2023	Orie McGinness	Paper Hearts/Afterglow
"Fallout"	2023	Orie McGinness	Paper Hearts/Afterglow
"Gone or Staying"	2024	Orie McGinness	Paper Hearts
"Stuck in My Head"	2024	Orie McGinness	Afterglow
"Paralyzed"	2024	Unknown	Afterglow
"Static"	2025	Orie McGinness	Afterglow
"III"	2025	Orie McGinness	Afterglow
"Gravity"	2025	Orie McGinness	Afterglow
"Break the Silence"	2025	Orie McGinness	Start Again
"Words Are Worthless"	2026	Orie McGinness	Afterglow
"Bye Bye Bye" (*NSYNC cover)	2026	Hugo Rubiano	(E)motional (S)upport (C)are (P)ackage
"My Heart" (Paramore cover)	2026	Hugo Rubiano	(E)motional (S)upport (C)are (P)ackage
"Cruel Summer" (Taylor Swift cover)	2026	Hugo Rubiano	(E)motional (S)upport (C)are (P)ackage
"Giving In"	2026	Lewis Cater	TBA

== Awards and nominations ==
Heavy Music Awards

Year	Nominee / work	Award	Result
2025	Sleep Theory	Best International Breakthrough Artist	Won

iHeartRadio Music Awards

Year	Nominee / work	Award	Result
2026	Sleep Theory	Best New Artist (Rock)	Won
