= AfterLife (song) =

2022 song by Five Finger Death Punch

Single by Five Finger Death Punch

from the album AfterLife
- Released: April 12, 2022
- Length: 4:03
- Label: Better Noise
- Songwriters: Ivan Moody; Zoltan Bathory; Charlie Engen; Chris Kael; Andy James; Kevin Churko
- Producers: Moody; Bathory; Engen; Kael; James; Churko

Five Finger Death Punch singles chronology
"Darkness Settles In" (2021)	"AfterLife" (2022)	"Welcome to the Circus" (2022)

Lyric video
- "AfterLife" on YouTube

"AfterLife" is a song by American heavy metal band Five Finger Death Punch. Released on April 12, 2022, it is the lead single from their ninth studio album, AfterLife. It became the band's 12th number-one single on the Billboard Mainstream Rock Airplay chart.

== Background and release ==
The song was released on April 12, 2022, as the title track of the band's then upcoming album AfterLife, which was produced by Kevin Churko. Its release coincided with the announcement of a tour featuring Megadeth, The Hu, and Fire from the Gods.

== Composition and lyrics ==
According to Loudwire, the song opens with an atmospheric guitar line before giving way to drums and a full-band arrangement with a pulsing low end. It features a range of vocal styles from Ivan Moody, including clean melodic vocals, screaming, and deep baritone spoken passages. Guitar World described the song as opening with a reverb-heavy clean guitar intro before moving into snare rolls and electric guitar lead lines. Around the 2:30 mark, a brief breakdown leads into a short guitar solo featuring runs and a final bend. Rich Hobson of Metal Hammer wrote that the song's riffs "chug like a freight train" and described its "six-string wizardry" as having a "proper stadium feel". The song features new guitar licks from guitarist Andy James.

Guitarist Zoltan Bathory stated that "AfterLife" is about using one's free will to act and not waiting for a higher power to intervene.

== Critical reception ==
Philip Wilding of Classic Rock wrote that the track would cause a hockey arena full of punters to "lose their minds". Travis Lausch of Ultimate Guitar commented that, compared with "Welcome to the Circus", Moody is somewhat more introspective and self-aware at times on "AfterLife".

== Track listing ==
"AfterLife" – by Five Finger Death Punch single
No.	Title	Length
1.	"AfterLife" (explicit)	4:03

== Chart performance ==
It reached No. 1 on the Billboard Mainstream Rock Airplay chart on June 11, 2022, their twelfth song to do so. It is their eighth consecutive number-one single, breaking a previous tie with Disturbed and Shinedown. The achievement placed the band fourth for the most number-one songs in the chart's history.

== Personnel ==
Credits adapted from Apple Music.

Five Finger Death Punch

- Ivan Moody – lead vocals, songwriter, producer
- Zoltan Bathory – guitar, songwriter, producer
- Charlie Engen – drums, songwriter, producer
- Chris Kael – bass guitar, songwriter, producer
- Andy James – guitar, songwriter, producer

Additional credit

- Kevin Churko – songwriter, producer, mixing engineer, engineer

== Charts ==
=== Weekly charts ===
Weekly chart performance for "AfterLife"
Chart (2022)	Peak position
Canada Digital Song Sales (Billboard)	40
Canada Rock (Billboard)	40
US Digital Song Sales (Billboard)	43
US Hot Rock & Alternative Songs (Billboard)	28
US Rock & Alternative Airplay (Billboard)	8
US Mainstream Rock Airplay (Billboard)	1

=== Year-end charts ===
Year-end chart performance for "AfterLife"
Chart (2022)	Position
US Rock & Alternative Airplay (Billboard)	37
US Mainstream Rock Airplay (Billboard)	14
