= By a Monster's Hand =

2025 song by Volbeat

Single by Volbeat

from the album God of Angels Trust
- Released: 6 March 2025
- Length: 3:42
- Label: Vertigo; Universal
- Songwriter: Michael Poulsen
- Producers: Jacob Hansen; Poulsen

Volbeat singles chronology
"Temple of Ekur" (2022)	"By a Monster's Hand" (2025)	"In the Barn of the Goat Giving Birth to Satan's Spawn in a Dying World of Doom" (2025)

Music video
- "By a Monster's Hand" on YouTube

"By a Monster's Hand" is a song by Danish rock band Volbeat. It was released as the lead single from their ninth album, God of Angels Trust. It topped the Billboard Mainstream Rock Airplay chart in May 2025.

== Background and release ==
"By a Monster's Hand" is the first single and lead track from God of Angels Trust, released alongside the announcement of the album, and was accompanied by a music video directed by Adam Rothlein. The band described the track as "the perfect introduction to an album full of power and electrifying rock anthems". They also released a track-by-track video in April 2025 discussing the song.

== Lyrics and themes ==
In a track-by-track guide for the album, the band explained that the song presents a fictional narrative centered on a serial killer. The storyline involves the character gathering and transporting body parts after a storm destroys his home, and is described as the first part of a two-part story that continues in "Enlightening the Disorder (By a Monster's Hand Part 2)". The band stated that the song was inspired by real-life serial killers, without naming specific individuals.

Speaking with Revolver, frontman Michael Poulsen said the song is told from the perspective of a killer and is based in reality, though he avoided referencing specific real-life figures out of respect for the victims. He linked the song to the album's broader focus on hidden human evil, concerns about violent criminals persisting in the modern world, and his experiences as a parent.

== Composition and style ==
Several critics described the song as a mid-tempo, riff-driven track with heavy rhythms. Writing for Knotfest, Ramon Gonzales noted the driving guitar work, mid-paced intensity, and anthemic vocal performance from Poulsen. Similarly, Revolver described the song as featuring stadium-sized metal rhythms and detuned guitar riffs characteristic of Volbeat's style. Blabbermouth.net described it as a mid-paced, riff-driven track with contrasting rhythmic patterns. The publication also noted theatrical elements and a brief mid-song change of pace inspired by Poulsen's love of thrash. Meanwhile, MetalSucks considered the song stylistically typical of Volbeat, noting that it does not significantly depart from the band's established sound. According to Loudwire, the track is heavy and punchy, driven by a stomping rhythm. Consequence described it as a mid-tempo track combining heavy grooves and melody, with a chorus featuring "ascending lead guitars" and an epic vocal delivery from Poulsen, and compared its overall feel to Metallica's Black Album era. MXDWN described the song as a mid-paced track centered on riffs, noting its structure does not follow standard meter and juxtaposes forceful rhythmic passages with hook-driven sections. A later MXDWN album review noted that the song opens with a heavy guitar riff and nonstop drumming, is slightly slower than the surrounding tracks, and combines gritty heaviness with melodic elements. Stereoboard described the track as a "hard-hitting yet melodic" riff-heavy rocker, while Angry Metal Guy cited "By a Monster's Hand" as one of the album's tracks that reaches "a near-thrash level" with furious riffing and blastbeats.

== Critical reception ==
Metal Injection called it a "relentless" track, while AllMusic's review of the album singled out "By a Monster's Hand" as one of the album's "high‑octane" singles.

== Music video ==
The music video mixes footage of the band performing with a narrative featuring a drifter wearing glasses who pulls a cart through a neighborhood. It was produced by Ghost Atomic and directed by Adam Rothlein, who had previously directed other Volbeat videos.

== Track listing ==
By a Monster's Hand - by Volbeat Single
No.	Title	Length
1.	"By a Monster's Hand"	3:42

== Personnel ==
Credits adapted from Apple Music.

Volbeat

- Michael Poulsen – vocals, guitar, songwriter, producer
- Jon Larsen – drums, composer
- Kaspar Boye Larsen – bass, composer
- Flemming C. Lund – guitar

Additional credit

- Jacob Hansen – producer, mastering engineer, mixing engineer

== Commercial performance ==
It reached No. 1 on the Billboard Mainstream Rock Airplay chart on May 17, 2025, their eleventh song to do so. This ties them for the 10th-most No. 1s in the chart's history.

== Charts ==
=== Weekly charts ===
Weekly chart performance for "By a Monster's Hand"
Chart (2025)	Peak position
Canada Mainstream Rock (Billboard)	9
Finland (Suomen virallinen lista)	88
Germany Airplay (TopHit)	33
Sweden Heatseeker (Sverigetopplistan)	14
US Rock & Alternative Airplay (Billboard)	6
US Hard Rock Digital Song Sales (Billboard)	6
US Mainstream Rock Airplay (Billboard)	1

=== Year-end charts ===
Year-end chart performance for "By a Monster's Hand"
Chart (2025)	Position
Canada Mainstream Rock (Billboard)	23
US Mainstream Rock Airplay (Billboard)	20
