= Stuck in My Head (song) =

2024 single by Sleep Theory

Single by Sleep Theory

from the album Afterglow
- Released: July 18, 2024
- Genre: Nu metal
- Length: 3:17
- Label: Epitaph
- Songwriters: Cullen Moore; Paolo Vergara; Ben Pruitt; Daniel Pruitt; David Cowell
- Producer: Cowell

Sleep Theory singles chronology
"Fallout" (2023)	"Stuck in My Head" (2024)	"Paralyzed" (2024)

Music video
- "Stuck in My Head" on YouTube

"Stuck in My Head" is a song by American rock band Sleep Theory. Originally released as a standalone single in 2024, it was later included as the first single on their debut album, Afterglow. It reached No. 1 on the Billboard Mainstream Rock Airplay chart in February 2025.

== Background and release ==
The song was released on July 18, 2024, accompanied by an official music video. BraveWords described the song as having propulsive riffing and an unforgettable, heartfelt chorus. The band said the song captures their journey and the emotions they experienced along the way, and that the video marks the next step in their musical and visual evolution.

== Composition and lyrics ==
"Stuck in My Head" is a nu rock track combining Linkin Park-style arena heaviness with pop-rock hooks. Frontman Cullen Moore sings with an R&B-influenced style throughout the song. The lyrics concern "nostalgic yearning" and how a familiar song can bring back memories of a past relationship. Kerrang! stated that the song is the work of a songwriter who grew up listening to Bobby Brown and Michael Jackson, but said it still rocks.

== Reception ==
According to Melodic, the song was referred to as a viral single and was included among the album's recommended tracks.

== Chart performance ==
It reached No. 1 on the Billboard Mainstream Rock Airplay chart on February 22, 2025, their first song to do so. It also ranked No. 16 on Rock Sound's Top 24 Songs of 2024 and was one of the most-played rock radio tracks in 2025.

== Track listing ==
"Stuck in My Head" – by Sleep Theory single
No.	Title	Length
1.	"Stuck in My Head"	3:17

== Personnel ==
Credits adapted from Apple Music.

Sleep Theory

- Cullen Moore – vocals, songwriter
- Paolo Vergara – bass, songwriter
- Ben Pruitt – drums, songwriter
- Daniel Pruitt – guitar, songwriter

Additional credit

- David Cowell – producer

== Charts ==
=== Weekly charts ===
Weekly chart performance for "Stuck in My Head"
Chart (2025)	Peak position
Canada Mainstream Rock (Billboard)	39
US Rock & Alternative Airplay (Billboard)	11
US Mainstream Rock Airplay (Billboard)	1

=== Year-end charts ===
Year-end chart performance for "Stuck in My Head"
Chart (2025)	Position
US Rock & Alternative Airplay (Billboard)	49
US Mainstream Rock Airplay (Billboard)	9
