= Johnny Andrews =

American songwriter and record producer

Johnny Andrews a.k.a. Johnny Lee Andrews
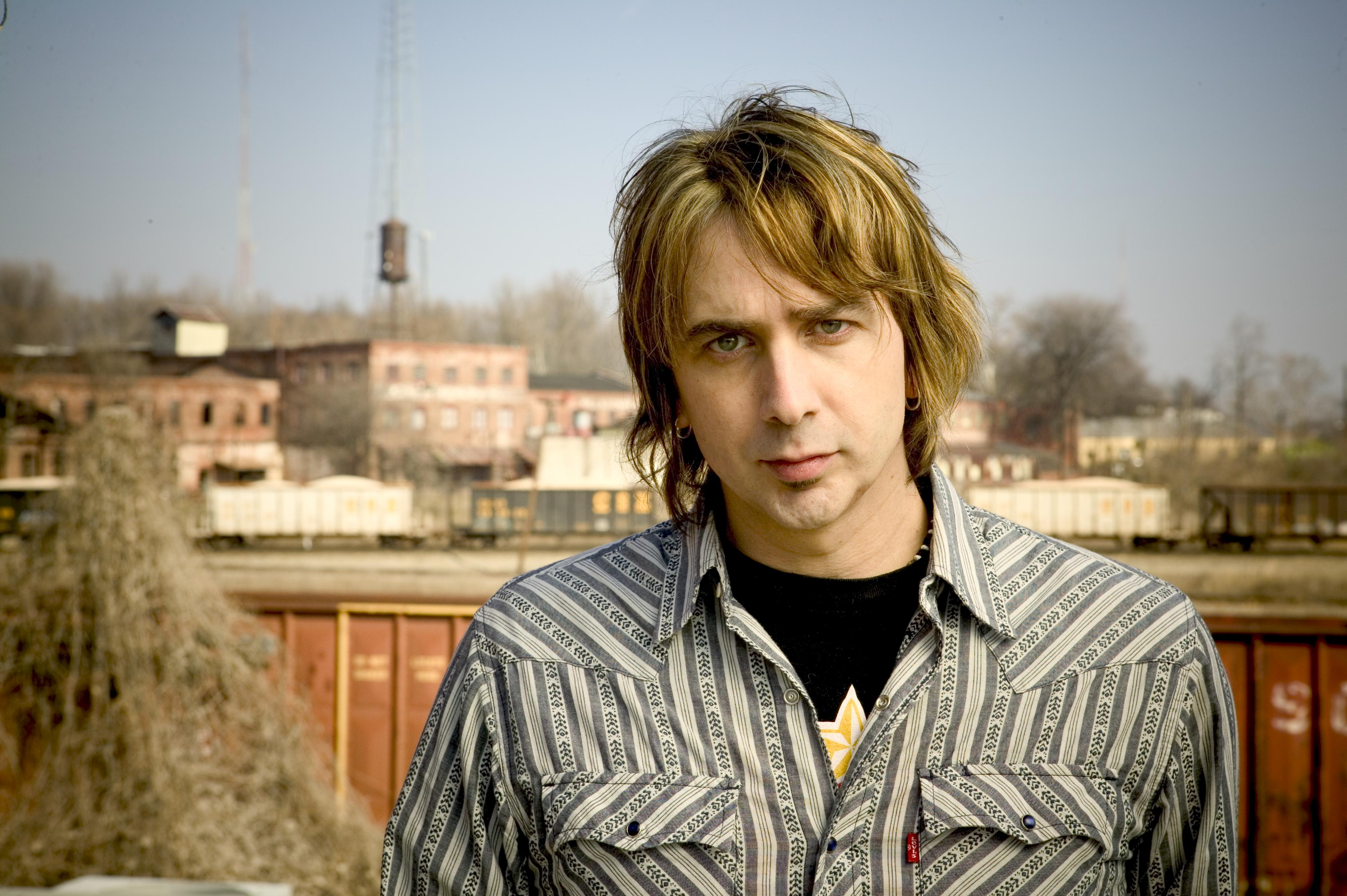

Background information
- Genres: Metal, Alternative, Rock, Country
- Occupations: Songwriter; record producer
- Years active: 2006-Present
- Website: johnnyandrews.net

Johnny Andrews is an American songwriter and record producer based in Atlanta, Georgia, and Nashville, Tennessee. Andrews has written multiple number one singles, including "I Am Machine" and "Painkiller" by Three Days Grace, "Freak Like Me" by Halestorm, and "Stand Up" by All That Remains. In addition to these bands, Andrews' compositions have been written with and performed by Apocalyptica featuring Corey Taylor ("Slipknot"), and Gavin Rossdale, Tarja Turunen, Theory of a Deadman, Motionless In White, Flyleaf, Red, Sick Puppies, and Chiodos.

== Credits ==
Year	Artist	Label	Song	Credits
2026	Motionless In White	Roadrunner	"Hollywood"	Writer
2026	Starset	Fearless	"p a r a d 0 x 1 c"	Writer
2026	Fozzy	Madison	"Madison"	Writer, Producer
2026	Above Snakes	TWRS	"Make Amends"	Writer
2025	Starset	Fearless	"Toksik", "Dystopia"	Writer
2025	Butcher Babies	Judge and Jury	"Sincerity"	Writer
2025	Brkn Love	Spinefarm	"Crooked Tongue"	Writer
2025	Dead Eyes	Thriller	"Thanks For Nothing"	Writer
2025	Fozzy	Madison	"Fall In Line"	Writer
2025	Zillion, All That Remains	PotLuck Lunch	"Cannibals"	Writer
2025	Citizen Soldier	Self	"Figure Me Out", "Dead Butterflies"	Writer
2025	No Resolve	UNDRCVR	"Phenomenon"	Writer, Producer
2025	Bloomer	E8	"Why Can’t I Be Happy?"	Writer
2024	Ekoh	Just Us League	"Hole in Your Head"	Writer
2024	Call Me Karizma	FairPlay	"Death Of The Party"	Writer
2024	Citizen Soldier	Self	"Everybody Hates You", "Where Were You", "Feels Like a Funeral", "Rock Bottom", "Hospital Bed", "Save Me From My Angels", "Live Again"	Writer
2024	The Nocturnal Affair	Madison	"Cross Me Out"	Writer, Producer
2023	Nina Strauss ft. Chris Motionless	Sumerian	"Digital Bullets"	Writer
2023	Nina Strauss ft. Lzzy Hale	Sumerian	"Through the Noise"	Writer
2023	Blind Channel	Sony	"DeadZone" (Single)	Writer
2023	Left To Suffer	Judge and Jury	"Noah" (Single)	Writer
2023	Catch Your Breath	Thriller	"Savages", "Y.S.K.W." & "Deadly"	Writer
2023	Conquer Divide	Mascot	"The Invisible" & "New Heaven"	Writer
2023	Saul	Spinefarm	"A Million Miles" (Single)	Writer
2023	Through Fire	Sumerian	"Straightjacket"	Writer
2023	The Funeral Portrait	Better Noise	"Alien", "Generation Psycho" & "Dark Thoughts"	Writer, Producer
2022	Saint Asonia	Spinefarm	"Wolf"	Writer
2022	Starset	Fearless	"Infected" (Single)	Writer
2022	Motionless In White	Roadrunner	"Meltdown" & "Scoring the End of the World"	Writer
2022	Three Days Grace	BMG	"A Scar Is Born" & "Redemption"	Writer
2022	The Funeral Portrait	Better Noise	"Voodoo Doll"	Co-writer, Producer
2022	Crobot	Mascot	"Golden" (Single) & "Electrified"	Writer
2022	Fozzy	Sony Orchard	"Sane" (Single), "I Still Burn" (Single) & "Army Of One" (Single)	Writer, Producer (entire record)
2022	Twiztid ft. Ice Nine Kills	Majik Ninja	"Envy"	Writer
2022	Awake At Last	AAL/The Fuel	"Dead To Me" (Single)	Writer
2020	From Ashes to New	Better Noise	"What I Get" & "Change My Past"	Writer
2020	Adelita's Way	Vegas Sun	"Habit" (Single)	Writer
2019	Starset	Fearless	"Trials" (Single)	Writer
2019	Motionless In White	Atlantic/Roadrunner	"Brand New Dumb" (Single), "Thoughts and Prayers" & "Holding Onto Smoke"	Writer
2019	Fozzy	Sony Red/Century	"Nowhere to Run"	Writer
2019	Through Fire	Sumerian	"Doubt" (Single)	Writer
2019	Crobot	Mascot	"Low Life"	Writer
2019	New Years Day	Sony Red/Century	"Break My Body"	Writer
2019	Modern Space	Warner Canada	"Ship Is Sinking"	Writer
2019	Twiztid	Majik Ninja	"Generation" Nightmare"	Writer, Mix Engineer
2019	Buckcherry	Century Media	"Right Now"	Writer
2019	Devour The Day	Razor and Tie	"Faithless"	Writer
2019	Apocolyptica	Columbia/Sony Music	"Grace", "Stroke" & "End of Me"	Writer
2018	Three Days Grace	BMG	"Mountain" (#1 Single), "Strange Days", "Chasing The First Time", "I Am An Outsider", "Villain I'm Not", "Nothing To Lose But You" & "Haunted"	Writer
2018	Underoath	Fearless	"Rapture" & "Wake Me"	Writer
2018	Diamante	Eleven Seven	"Haunted"	Writer
2018	Cane Hill	Rise Records	"It Follows"	Writer
2017	In This Moment	Atlantic	"Joan Of Arc"	Writer
2017	Motionless In White	Atlantic/Roadrunner	"Voices" & "Soft"	Writer
2017	Fozzy	Sony Red/Century	"Judas" #5 & "Painless" #6	Co-writer, Producer
2017	Starset	Razor and Tie	"Monster" & "Monster" #2 Rock	Writer
2017	As Lions	Eleven Seven	"Aftermath"	Writer
2017	Adelitas Way	Vegas Syn/The Fuel Music	"Trapped"	Writer
2016	Cover Your Tracks	Epitaph	"Cages" & "Follow Me"	Writer
2016	Letters From The Fire	Sand Hill	"Give In To Me"	Writer
2016	Tarja	earMusic	"The Living End"	Writer
2016	The Black Moods	Another Century	"Within Without"	Writer
2016	Sarah Simmons	Self-Released	"All We Want"	Writer
2016	Adelita's Way	Vegas Syn	"Low"	Writer
2016	Farewell Angelina	Dreamlined	"Shotgun Summer"	Writer
2015	Three Days Grace	RCA	"I Am Machine" #1 Rock & "Painkiller" #1 Rock	Writer
2015	Escape The Fate	Eleven Seven	"Remember Every Scar"	Writer
2015	Ice Nine Kills	Fearless	"The Plot Sickens"	Writer
2015	Butcher Babies	Century Media	"Never Go Back"	Writer
2015	Kovacs	Warner Germany	"Wolf in Cheap Clothes"	Writer
2015	Red	Sony Provident	"Take Me Over"	Writer
2015	Wilson	Razor and Tie	"Right to Rise", "Guilty", "Crave", "Window's Down!", "All My Friends", "Satisfy Me", "The Flood", "Hang with the Devil", "I Am the Fly", "Give 'Em Hell", "Waiting for the World to Cave In" & "Before I Burn"	Writer
2015	Apocalyptica	Eleven Seven	"Shadowmaker", "Slow Burn" & "House of Chains"	Writer
2014	Theory of a Deadman	Roadrunner	"World War Me"	Writer
2014	Flyleaf	Loud and Proud	"Set Me On Fire"	Writer
2014	Chiodos	Razor and Tie	"3am" (1st Single) & "Duct Tape"	Writer
2014	Kyng	Razor and Tie	"Electric Halo"	Writer
2014	Bad Seed Rising	Atlantic	"Wolves At The Door"	Writer
2014	Fozzy	Century Media	"Lights Go Out" & "No Good Way"	Writer
2013	All That Remains	Razor and Tie	"Stand Up"	Writer
2013	Red	Provident/Sony	"Perfect Life", "So Far Away", "Same Disease" & "Love Will Leave A Mark"	Writer
2013	Sick Puppies	Universal Music	"Walking Away"	Writer
2013	William Beckett	Equal Vision	"Benny and Joon"	Writer
2013	Royal Teeth	Dangerbird	"Vagabonds"	Writer
2013	Tarja	earMusic	"500 Letters" & "Never Enough"	Writer
2013	Emphatic	Epochal/Capitol	"Lights"	Writer
2013	Eyes Set To Kill	Century Media	"Little Liar"	Writer
2013	Scott Stapp	Windup	"Beautiful Cage"	Writer
2012	Halestorm	Atlantic	"Freak Like Me"	Writer
2012	Mark Forster	Sony/Four Music	"Auf Dem Weg" (First Single)	Writer
2012	Max Buskohl	Universal Germany	"No More Bad Days", "Harder to Breathe", "Can't Get A Minute" & "Love is The Easiest"	Writer
2012	Ich Kann Fliegen	Universal Germany	"Katastrophen"	Writer
2012	Black Pistol Fire	MudHut	"Sort Me Out" & "Bottle Rocket"	Writer
2011	Stealing Angels	Skyline/Warner Nashville	"Lord, Don't Give Up"	Writer
2011	Maylene and the Sons of Disaster	Ferret/ILG	"Come For You", "Faith Healer" & "Killing Me Slow"	Writer
2011	Jaap Rasema	Sony Music	"Changing Man", "Soulful Life" & "Bye Bye Baby"	Writer
2011	We As Human	Atlantic	"Double Life"	Writer
2010	Apocolyptica	Sony/Jive	"End of Me"	Writer
2010	10 Years	Universal Republic	"Waking Up The Ghost"	Writer
2010	Tarja Turunen	Universal Germany	"Until My Last Breath", "Falling Awake", "Underneath" & "Little Lies"	Writer
2010	Chris LeMay	EMI Netherlands	"You Did It For The Rush", "Heading Down" & "I've Got Dreams"	Writer
2010	Fady Maalouf	Columbia	"Holding Onto Water"	Writer
2010	Lacrimas Profundere	Napalm	"The Letter", "All is Suffering" & "Of Words and Rain"	Writer
2009	Better Than Ezra	Megaforce	"Just One Day"	Writer
2009	Die Mannequin	Warner Canada	"Open Season"	Writer
2009	The 69 Eyes	EMI Finland	"We Own The Night" & "Eternal"	Writer
2008	Apocalyptica	Sony/Jive	"I'm Not Jesus" & "S.O.S. (Anything But Love)"	Writer
2008	Tat	Redwagon/Megaforce	"Everything I Want", "Taking It All" & "Take You Home"	Writer
2008	The Becoming	Tooth and Nail	"Escape You"	Writer
2007	Eicca Toppinen	Universal Music	"Black Ice" (Soundtrack)	Writer
2007	Ligion	Maple Jam/ICON	"Carry Me"	Writer
