= Mercy (Ayron Jones song) =

2021 song by Ayron Jones

Single by Ayron Jones

from the album Child of the State
- Released: February 5, 2021
- Recorded: 2020
- Length: 3:25
- Label: John Varvatos/Big Machine
- Songwriters: Ayron Jones; Marti Frederiksen; Scott Stevens
- Producers: Frederiksen; Stevens

Ayron Jones singles chronology
"Take Me Away" (2020)	"Mercy" (2021)	"Supercharged" (2021)

Live from Nashville single artwork

Music video
- "Mercy" on YouTube

"Mercy" is a single by American musician Ayron Jones from his third studio album, Child of the State. It peaked at number one on the U.S. Billboard Mainstream Rock Airplay chart in June 2021.

== Background and release ==
Ayron Jones said "Mercy" continued the themes of his experiences as a Black artist in rock music and in the United States, while also summarizing the experiences of Americans during 2020. He said the song was written from the perspective of both an observer and a participant, and said it captured climate change, social unrest, the fragility of democracy and the COVID-19 pandemic.

A lyric video for "Mercy" was released by February 5, 2021. Jones later released an official music video for the song.

== Composition and lyrics ==
Jones wrote "Mercy" during the peak of the Black Lives Matter protests, along with Marti Frederiksen and Scott Stevens, toward the end of 2020, while he was working on his forthcoming album. The song is about the chaos in the United States during 2020. Jones said he wanted the track to sound unsettling. He said Nirvana and Mudhoney had a soft-loud dynamic with tension and release, which he picked up on with his riffs and arrangements.

Jones linked the lyrics to his experiences in Seattle during 2020, including civil unrest and protests and wildfires that caused poor air quality. Jones said the lyric "got me on my knees / too much smoke, can't breathe" could be interpreted in multiple ways, including the smoke from the wildfires, the response to the protests, climate change and the COVID-19 pandemic. He said the line summed up what was happening in America at the time. He said the song gave people an outsider's view of the country, particularly from his perspective as a Black man. Jones said the line "when I die, I'll die free" came from the idea of freedom in America. He said Americans are taught that they "will live free or die" and that, regardless of political ideology, freedom is something Americans are brought up to believe in. Jones said he wanted the line to express perseverance despite the difficulties in the United States.

== Reception ==
Joe Bosso of Guitar World described the song as a "bruising anthem" with corrosive rhythms and an epic, spiraling guitar solo. Lauryn Schaffner of Loudwire described "Mercy" as a song about inequality and social injustice, with gritty vocals and infectious riffs. Fraser Lewry and Polly Glass compared Jones to a heavier, grungier Gary Clark Jr., noting his combination of hip-hop sensibilities and old-school blues. They wrote that Jones had "one ear" to the blues of Stevie Ray Vaughan and "another" to the heroes of his native Seattle, while noting a touch of Michael Jackson in his vocals.

== Track listing ==
"Mercy" single
No.	Title	Length
1.	"Mercy"	3:25

"Mercy (live from Nashville)" single
No.	Title	Length
1.	"Mercy" (live from Nashville)	4:02

== Personnel ==
Credits adapted from Apple Music.

Performing artists

- Ayron Jones – vocals, guitar
- Marti Frederiksen – bass guitar
- Scott Stevens – programming, keyboards
- Evan Frederiksen – drums

Production and engineering

- Marti Frederiksen – producer, engineer
- Scott Stevens – producer, engineer
- Eric Lilavois – additional producer
- Chris Lord-Alge – mixing engineer
- Ted Jensen – mastering engineer

== Chart performance ==
"Mercy" reached number one on the Billboard Mainstream Rock Airplay chart dated June 5, 2021, giving Jones his first number-one song on the chart.

=== Weekly charts ===
Weekly chart performance for "Mercy"
Chart (2021)	Peak position
US Rock & Alternative Airplay (Billboard)	13
US Mainstream Rock Airplay (Billboard)	1

=== Year-end charts ===
Year-end chart performance for "Mercy"
Chart (2021)	Position
US Rock & Alternative Airplay (Billboard)	48
US Mainstream Rock Airplay (Billboard)	16
