= Dark Thoughts (The Funeral Portrait song) =

2023 song by The Funeral Portrait

Single by The Funeral Portrait

from the album Greetings from Suffocate City
- Released: September 22, 2023
- Length: 4:08
- Label: Better Noise
- Composers: Lee Jennings; Robert Weston; Homer Umbanhower; Cody Weissinger; Johnny Andrews; Josh Landry
- Producers: Andrews; Landry

The Funeral Portrait singles chronology
"Generation Psycho" (2023)	"Dark Thoughts" (2023)	"Suffocate City" (2024)

Music video
- "Dark Thoughts" on YouTube

Dark Thoughts

EP by The Funeral Portrait
- Released: August 22, 2025
- Length: 16:09
- Label: Better Noise
- Producers: Johnny Andrews; Josh Landry

The Funeral Portrait chronology
Casanova (From Beyond the Abyss) (2024)	Dark Thoughts (2025)

"Dark Thoughts" is a song by American rock band The Funeral Portrait, the fifth track on Greetings From Suffocate City. It was released as a single, and the album version features guest vocals from Danny Worsnop of Asking Alexandria. The song reached number one on the Billboard Mainstream Rock Airplay chart in January 2026.

== Background and recording ==
Vocalist Lee Jennings stated that several songs on the album developed from early demos, citing "Dark Thoughts" as one of the tracks that developed from those demos. He added that he had not expected the song to resonate as strongly as it did upon release.

== Release and promotion ==
A version of the song featuring Danny Worsnop of Asking Alexandria was later recorded. Jennings stated that Worsnop reached out to collaborate on the track and "helped take it to a whole new level".

On August 22, 2025, "Dark Thoughts" was released to radio as a single and appeared on the four-track "The Dark Thoughts EP". The EP includes the original track, a version featuring Worsnop, a "Beyond The Abyss" remix, and a live recording from the band's first "Suffocate City" Town Hall Meeting in Atlanta.

== Composition and themes ==
Jennings described it as a "finger snapping anthemic banger" about mental health struggles, particularly his experiences with OCD. He said the song is rooted in feeling trapped in one's own mind and having no one to reach out to for understanding or support. With the re-release of Greetings from Suffocate City, the vocals of Jennings and Worsnop harmonize.

== Reception ==
In August 2024, Melodic magazine listed "Dark Thoughts" among the top tracks in its "On Your Radar" feature on The Funeral Portrait, written by Justice Petersen. In a September 2024 review of the album, Charlotte Griffiths of Distorted Sound Magazine noted that the guitar rhythm was similar to that of "You Know What They Do to Guys Like Us in Prison" by My Chemical Romance.

== Live performance ==
A live version of "Dark Thoughts" was recorded at the band's first hometown show, the "Suffocate City" Town Hall Meeting in Atlanta on November 17, 2024, and was included on the EP.

== Track listing ==
All music is composed by The Funeral Portrait, Johnny Andrews, and Josh Landry.

Dark Thoughts 2023 single / EP
No.	Title	Length
1.	"Dark Thoughts"	4:08
2.	"Generation Psycho"	3:49
3.	"Voodoo Doll"	3:58
4.	"Alien"	4:09
Total length:		16:06

Dark Thoughts 2025 EP
No.	Title	Length
1.	"Dark Thoughts (Beyond the Abyss remix)"	3:40
2.	"Dark Thoughts"	4:02
3.	"Dark Thoughts (featuring Danny Worsnop)"	4:01
4.	"Dark Thoughts (live from Suffocate City)"	4:09
Total length:		16:09

== Personnel ==
Credits adapted from Apple Music.

The Funeral Portrait

- Lee Jennings – lead vocals, composer
- Robert Weston – bass, composer
- Homer Umbanhower – drums, composer
- Cody Weissinger – lead guitar, composer

Additional credits

- Johnny Andrews – composer, producer
- Josh Landry – composer, producer

== Commercial performance ==
It reached No. 1 on the Billboard Mainstream Rock Airplay chart on January 24, 2026, their third song to do so and third consecutive.

== Charts ==
Weekly chart performance for "Dark Thoughts"
Chart (2025–2026)	Peak position
US Rock & Alternative Airplay (Billboard)	13
US Mainstream Rock Airplay (Billboard)	1
