= Chokt =

American industrial rock band

- Genres: Industrial rock, alternative metal
- Years active: 2006–2009 (hiatus)
- Members: Pete Murray; Walter Flakus; John Stevens

Chokt is an American industrial rock band featuring Pete Murray of Lo-Pro and Ultraspank, Walter Flakus of Stabbing Westward, and John Stevens of Ghost Machine and The Clay People. The trio recorded an album's worth of material together, releasing songs one by one over the course of 2006 to 2009. It served as an outlet for Murray for songs that didn't quite fit the hard rock sound of Lo-Pro, during the six year gap in between Lo-Pro releases.

== History ==
=== Formation (2002-2004) ===
Pete Murray released two albums as the frontman of nu metal band Ultraspank, and when the band broke up, he eventually formed the hard rock band Lo-Pro with guitarist Neil Godfrey. They released one self-titled album in 2003. However, after touring in support of the album, they were dropped from the Geffen record label. The band went through a six-year period before releasing music as a band again, with the band spending searching for a new label while continually writing new material and reworking unsatisfactory material. During this time, Murray worked with Ivan Moody, who afterward formed Five Finger Death Punch, and Jon Stevens, past guitarist of The Clay People, in their band Ghost Machine. Murray produced their albums Ghost Machine and Hypersensitive. After the sessions, Murray and Stevens continued to work together outside of Ghost Machine, eventually deciding to form a new band, called Chokt, with Walter Flakus of Stabbing Westward.

=== Chokt releases (2005-2009) ===
The band began recording material in 2005. The band opted to pursue an industrial rock sound, reminiscent of Flakus's work in Stabbing Westward and Steven's work in The Clay People. Murray used the band as an outlet for the music that wasn't fitting the traditional hard rock sound he aimed for with Lo-Pro. Murray performed vocals, while the other two both contributed "guitar, bass, and programming", while using a drum machine for the drum work. Members were never actually in the same room together when working on music, but rather, they used Pro-Tools and emailed each other parts back and forth. The band started streaming songs in 2006, and continued to stream a few per year up through 2009. Most debuted on the band's Myspace, but occasionally from Murray's Myspace as well. Chokt ceased releasing tracks after the 2009 track "Only You", which was released just before Murray became active with Lo-Pro again, with them releasing the Letting Go EP in October 2009 and The Beautiful Sounds of Revenge on June 8, 2010. In an interview for Lo-Pro, Pete Murray announced his intentions to gain more exposure for Chokt, stating that the band "won't be secret for long".

== Discography ==
Chokt sessions songs

1. Train Home to Nothing (2006)
2. Passion (2006)
3. Burning (2006)
4. Distress (2006)
5. Magazine (2007)
6. Launch Pad (2008)
7. Tonight (2008)
8. Only You (2009)

== Band members ==
- Pete Murray – vocals
- Walter Flakus – guitars, bass, programming
- John Stevens – guitars, bass, programming
