= Higher (Life On Planet 9 album) =

Studio album by Life On Planet 9/Lo-Pro
- Released: January 31, 2017
- Recorded: 2015–2016
- Genre: Electronic rock, alternative rock
- Length: 44:19
- Producer: Pete Murray

Life On Planet 9/Lo-Pro chronology
The Theory of Everything (2014)	Higher (2017)

Singles from Higher
- 1. "All Your Words" Released: January 6, 2017

Higher is the third studio album by Life On Planet 9, the pseudonym for experimental releases for American hard rock band Lo-Pro. It was released on January 31, 2017.

== Background ==
Lead singer Pete Murray and guitarist Neil Godfrey first began working with each other in the late 1990s for the nu metal band Ultraspank. After two albums, the band disbanded, though the two later started a new hard rock band in the early 2000s, called Lo-Pro. The band released their major record label debut, Lo-Pro in 2003, and despite a top 20 mainstream rock single, "Sunday", the band was dropped from their label. After the split, Murray and Godfrey spent an extended five-year period of working on new material before releasing anything. The band found themselves with some material that was more centralized around acoustic guitar and electronic effects than Lo-Pro's hard rock sound. As such, the band decided to release the Lo-Pro acoustic/electronic sessions under a different moniker; the pseudonym Life On Planet 9. The band finally released their debut album, Bittersweet, in August 2011. and released a second album, The Theory of Everything in 2014.

A third album from the band was first announced on New Year's Eve 2015 with a 2016 release date intended. The first single from the album, "All Your Words", was released on January 6, 2017. The album's name, Higher, was announced a week later on January 13. A release date of January 31, 2017, was announced at the same time.

== Track listing ==
All lyrics are written by Pete Murray; all music is composed by Pete Murray and Neil Godfrey.

No.	Title	Length
1.	"Wake Up"	2:25
2.	"All Your Words"	3:18
3.	"Higher"	3:16
4.	"Gone"	4:24
5.	"Go"	4:42
6.	"Beacons"	4:28
7.	"P3"	4:40
8.	"Time to Run"	4:53
9.	"The Only Way Out is Through"	2:58
10.	"Last Summer"	4:03
11.	"Plutonium"	5:12
Total length:		44:19

== Personnel ==
- Pete Murray – vocals, electronic programming
- Neil Godfrey – guitars
