= White Noise Owl =

- Genres: Rock, hard rock
- Years active: 2014-present
- Label: Curtain Call Records
- Members: Pete Murray; Chris Shy; John Fahnestock; Will Hunt
- Website: www.whitenoiseowl.com

White Noise Owl is a rock supergroup composed of lead vocalist Pete Murray of Lo-Pro and Ultraspank, bassist John Fahnestock of Lo-Pro, Snot, and Amen, drummer Will Hunt of Evanescence and Dark New Day, and guitarist Chris Shy of Aurora Sky. Their debut EP, produced by Ben Grosse, Until We Meet Again, was released on March 11, 2014. After a series of delays, their debut full-length album, Condition Critical, is scheduled for release on November 1, 2019. The first single, "Something", was released on August 1, 2017.

== History ==
=== Formation and Until We Meet Again EP (2013–2014) ===
The project was first the idea of guitarist Chris Shy, the prior guitarist of band Aurora Sky. who envisioned doing a project with Pete Murray of Lo-Pro. He contacted Murray after the release of Lo-Pro's third album, Disintegration Effect, in June 2013. The two communicated vaguely about working together through email, which eventually led to sending song ideas back and forth. Upon completion of their first complete song, "Feed", the two decided a band should be started, and the two were tasked with forming a real band. Murray recruited John Fahnestock as a bass player, who he had worked with on Lo-Pro's first album, Lo-Pro prior to Fahnestock leaving during the six-year gap to their second album, The Beautiful Sounds of Revenge. Shy had always envisioned Will Hunt, prior drummer for Evanescence, Device and Dark New Day, as a member, and proceeded to recruit him for the project. The entire recruitment process had been done entirely over phone and internet; the band had not ever all been together in person until the start of the recording sessions. The band recorded their debut EP, Until We Meet Again, throughout the end of 2013 and early 2014, with music producer Ben Grosse, who had previously worked with Breaking Benjamin, Disturbed, and Filter. Grosse was chosen because Murray had desired to work with him since the recording of Lo-Pro's debut album, due to his involvement in producing Title of Record. The album was recorded in East West Studios. A minute long teaser clip was released in December 2013, with the band shooting for a "Spring 2014" release timeframe. The release date for Until We Meet Again was later narrowed down to March 11, 2014. A promotional single, "Feed", was released a week prior to the album's release on March 5, while the band's first single, "End Over End", was released shortly afterwards.

=== Condition Critical (2015–present) ===
Shortly after the release of Until We Meet Again, Murray announced that the band would continue working on new music, leading up to a release of a full-length album. In July 2014, the band announced that they would reconvene to work on more material in August. In September, the band provided an update that they were working on writing more music, making plans to record material, and practicing for live shows. In November, Fahnstock revealed that he had been recording bass parts for six new songs, and shortly after it was announced that the band was aiming for a release for sometime in 2015. The band later announced that the full-album release was pushed back to 2016. Hunt explained the reasons for the delay:

We have been working on new material now for the better part of a year. We have got some really cool stuff and it is certainly much different than anything I have ever been a part of. I think that we have got a deal in play right now, and I cannot say what it is yet, but it is not from America, it is for overseas. We are still working on America. For America, it is a new band, which you know is hard to break here as a Rock band. It is really tough, and I guess the thing is, with White Noise Owl, we are just looking for the right situation. None of us are young anymore, none of us can say, 'Hey, let’s just hop in the van and eat bologna sandwiches and try and break our band that way', that is just not realistic. We are taking our time with it, we are not in any hurry at all, and I think that the thing is, that the way that we carry ourselves about it, that it is kind of this open ended thing. We are hoping that this deal that I am talking about will allow us to go tour overseas for a little bit."

In January 2016, the band revealed that the record deal previously referred to had been in reference to signing to Warner Music of New Zealand. Final recording sessions for the album began on December 13, 2015 and went through the month of February, starting the mixing process on February 29, 2016. In March 2016, the band announced that the album had been made, and that more information on its release would be arising "very soon".

On August 1, 2017, the band announced the name of their debut album, Condition Critical, and released a music video for the album's first single, "Something". Condition Critical is scheduled for release in late 2017. In November 2017, the band announced the album was delayed into 2018, although it wouldn't end up being released across 2018 either. In July 2019, Murray reiterated that the album was still going to be released, but that there was still not a release date.

On October 11, 2019, the band finally announced a release date of November 1, 2019 for Condition Critical, while also releasing a new single “Maybe It’s Time” from the album on Curtain Call Records' website.

== Members ==
- Pete Murray - lead vocals (2013–present)
- Chris Shy - guitar (2013–present)
- John Fahnestock - bass (2013–present)
- Will Hunt - drums (2013–present)

== Discography ==
Album

- Condition Critical (2019)

EP

- Until We Meet Again (2014)
