= The Theory of Everything (Life on Planet 9 album) =

Studio album by Life On Planet 9/Lo-Pro
- Released: August 26, 2014
- Recorded: 2012–2014
- Genre: Alternative rock, electronic rock
- Length: 56:41
- Label: Independent
- Producer: Pete Murray

Life On Planet 9/Lo-Pro chronology
Disintegration Effect (2013)	The Theory of Everything (2014)	Higher (2017)

The Theory of Everything is the second studio album by Life On Planet 9, the pseudonym used by American hard rock band Lo-Pro when releasing music of a more experimental sound. The first album under the moniker, Bittersweet, had been more of an outlet for Lo-Pro's acoustic songs that had taken on too many electronic rock elements to be billed an acoustic album. The Theory of Everything largely disavows the acoustic elements in favor of electronic elements coupled with melodic guitar-work. It was released on August 26, 2014.

== Background ==
Lead singer Pete Murray and guitarist Neil Godfrey first began working with each other in the late 1990s for the nu metal band Ultraspank. After two albums, the band disbanded, though the two later started a new hard rock band in the early 2000s, called Lo-Pro. The band released their major record label debut, Lo-Pro in 2003, and despite a top 20 mainstream rock single, "Sunday", the band was dropped from their label. After the split, Murray and Godfrey spent an extended five-year period of working on new material before releasing anything. The band found themselves with some material that was more centralized around acoustic guitar and electronic effects than Lo-Pro's hard rock sound. As such, the band decided to release the Lo-Pro acoustic/electronic sessions under a different moniker; the pseudonym Life On Planet 9. The band finally released their debut album, Bittersweet, in August 2011.

== Writing and recording ==
Work on the album started in 2012, shortly after Bittersweet. Progress would be slow though, as Murray and Godfrey would concurrently be working on their 2013 Lo-Pro release, Disintegration Effect, and participating on the Battlefield of the Mind project, where they collaborated with members of Staind and Megadeth. Murray and Godfrey would refocus their efforts in mid-2013, with them stating that they were about 75% complete with the album as of August 2013, and done with all but one track by the end of the year. They spent the first half of the year tinkering with tracks and their mixes, with them wrapping up the final mixing process in June 2014.

== Promotion and release ==
The band released an early version of "What Would You Say" in June 2012. In early August, the band released a teaser video that showed clips of the tracks "Everything" and "Rainy Days", with a full version of "Rainy Days" being streamed on August 15. The album was released on August 26, 2014.

== Track listing ==
All lyrics are written by Pete Murray; all music is composed by Pete Murray and Neil Godfrey.

No.	Title	Length
1.	"Everything"	4:10
2.	"Home"	4:55
3.	"Ordinary"	4:21
4.	"The Sky"	4:31
5.	"Stay"	7:07
6.	"What Would You Say"	4:28
7.	"Now"	4:25
8.	"Rainy Days"	4:20
9.	"Tonight"	4:40
10.	"Here We Are"	4:55
11.	"Carry On"	4:12
12.	"The Stars"	4:37
Total length:		56:41

== Personnel ==
- Pete Murray - vocals, electronic programming
- Neil Godfrey - guitars
