= Until We Meet Again (EP) =

EP by White Noise Owl
- Released: March 11, 2014
- Recorded: 2013–2014
- Genre: Hard rock
- Length: 19:43
- Label: Independent
- Producer: Ben Grosse

White Noise Owl chronology
Until We Meet Again (2014)	Condition Critical (2019)

Singles from Until We Meet Again
- 1. "Feed" Released: March 5, 2014; 2. "End Over End" Released: March 5, 2014

Until We Meet Again is the debut extended play (EP) by rock supergroup White Noise Owl. It was released on March 11, 2014. A promotional single, "Feed", was released a week prior on March 5, 2014, while "End Over End" was later released as the EPs first and only official single.

== Background ==
=== Writing and recording ===
The EP's earlier origin tracks back to guitarist Chris Shy, the prior guitarist of band Aurora Sky, who envisioned doing a project with Pete Murray of Lo-Pro. He contacted Murray after the release of Lo-Pro's third album, Disintegration Effect, in June 2013. The two communicated vaguely about working together through email, which eventually led to sending song ideas back and forth. Upon completion of their first complete song, "Feed", the two decided to start work on writing songs for an EP, and the two were tasked with forming a real band. Murray recruited John Fahnestock, whom he had worked with on Lo-Pro's first album Lo-Pro prior to Fahnestock leaving during the six-year gap to their second album, The Beautiful Sounds of Revenge, as a bass player. Shy had always envisioned Will Hunt, prior drummer for Evanescence, Device and Dark New Day, as a member, and proceeded to recruit him for the project. The entire recruitment process had been done entirely over phone and Internet; the band had not ever all been together in person until the start of the recording sessions. Recording started at the end of 2013 and early 2014, with music producer Ben Grosse, who had previously worked with Breaking Benjamin, Disturbed, and Filter. Grosse was chosen because Murray had desired to work with him since the recording of Lo-Pro's debut album, due to his involvement in producing Title of Record. The album was recorded in East West Studios.

=== Concept and sound ===
Murray stated that the band was meant to sound like an evolution and maturation from the music he had previously done with Ultraspank and Lo-Pro. Murray states that while "anger" had been an inspiration for his music in the past, he feels he has "mellowed out" over the years, now being inspired by practicing yoga, which led to a theme of "the power of a quiet mind" for the EP. Murray explained the album title, stating:

"Until We Meet Again acts in the same way that “Sincerely” is the closing of a personal piece of correspondence. It was our way of authoring our name to the songs as a whole and the experience in general."

Both Murray and Shy felt that they were able to make the music the way they truly desired, without any external pressures such as a record label, since it was released independently, or fear of having to conform to "pay the bills", since it was not the only band or source of income for any members. The lyrics for "Bomber" were inspired by Murrays thoughts of likening the aggressive nature of people who "only thrive with drama" with World War II bomber plane attacks. "End Over End" was inspired by Murray's "here we go again"-type feelings upon starting up another band. The specific line "it was anarchy in the streets of my thoughts" refers to the chaotic nature of his own mind prior to finding peace in later years. "Breathe" is about keeping life's trouble's in perspective, with Murray stating "Bottom line is we really don’t have much to complain about. There are people in this world who have it so much worse. If you’re breathing, you’re winning. It’s that simple. I don’t need to throw a wedding at Versailles to feel like I’ve accomplished something"

== Release and promotion ==
A minute-long teaser clip was released in December 2013, with the band aiming for a "Spring 2014" release timeframe. A second teaser clip was released a month later in mid-January. The release date for Until We Meet Again was later narrowed down to March 11, 2014, with the band's first single, "Feed", was released as a promotional single a week prior on March 5, 2014, while "End Over End" was later released as the EP's first and only single.

== Reception ==
The New Zealand Herald gave the album a 4 out of 5 star review, comparing it favorably to the work of Filter and Seether, and concluding that "In five songs that will leave you breathless, White Noise Owl has harked back to the past three decades of rock to provide a glimpse of what could be the future sound of hard rock.

== Track listing ==
All music is composed by White Noise Owl.

No.	Title	Length
1.	"How Was the Week?"	0:56
2.	"Feed"	3:51
3.	"Bomber"	4:06
4.	"End Over End"	4:33
5.	"Are You Breathing?"	5:28
Total length:		19:43

== Personnel ==
Band

- Pete Murray - lead vocals
- Chris Shy - guitar
- John Fahnestock - bass
- Will Hunt - drums

Production

- Ben Grosse - production
