= Downthesun =

American metal band

- Downthesun with Shawn Crahan, 2002

Background information
- Also known as: The Six
- Origin: Kansas City, Missouri/Des Moines, Iowa, US
- Genres: Nu metal; alternative metal
- Years active: 1999–2004; 2010–2011 (indefinite hiatus)
- Labels: Maggot Corps.; London-Sire; Roadrunner
- Past members: Anthony Stevens; Aaron Peltz; Lance Collier; Nathan Church; Danny Spain; Bruce Swink; Neil Godfrey; Jason Martz; Nick Trotter; Cameron Fitzmaurice; Matthew Burns
- Website

Downthesun (stylised in lowercase) was an American nu metal band formed in Kansas City, Missouri in 1999. The group was known for their abrasive and heavy sound as well as their association with Slipknot. Downthesun was the only act signed to Slipknot's short-lived record label, Maggot Corps. The group released one studio album, 2002's Downthesun, before breaking up in 2004. They briefly reunited in 2010 and have been inactive since 2011.

== History ==
=== Formation and early years (1999–2001) ===
Downthesun was formed by bassist Lance "Kuk" Collier and keyboardist Nathan Church, who were in a local Kansas City rap metal band called Canvas. Canvas played a variety of battle-of-the-bands shows in the area, and while they never won, they were able to secure a slot as an opener for Slipknot. This led to Collier and Church meeting Slipknot percussionist Shawn "Clown" Crahan, who introduced them to drummer Danny Spain and vocalist Anthony "Satone" Stevens, who had previously worked as a drum technician for Crahan. Collier and Church soon left Canvas due to the band wanting to change its sound away from metal. The band then added vocalist Aaron Peltz and guitarist Bruce Swink to the lineup, before eventually settling on the name downthesun. In October 2001, they became the first signing to Slipknot's newly created Maggot Recordings label (later renamed Maggot Corps.), which was owned by London-Sire Records, a subsidiary of Warner Music Group.

=== downthesun (2001–2002) ===
Between May and June 2001, the band recorded their self-titled debut album in six weeks at The Warehouse Studio in Vancouver, with producer GGGarth, with Shawn Crahan acting as executive producer. The record was completed in December, with Crahan helping with the artwork. Prior to recording the album's guitar tracks, the band's original guitarist broke his hand after punching a wall while drunk. Subsequently, Lance Collier contacted Ultraspank guitarist Neil Godfrey to record the album's guitar tracks. While he was almost made a permanent member of the band, Godfrey left to join Lo-Pro (featuring Ultraspank bandmate Pete Murray) and Motograter. Downthesun then recruited Bruce Swink to handle guitar duties during live shows. The band planned on releasing the album in early February 2002, but its scheduled release plan was shelved around November 2001, during which time London-Sire Records was beginning to close. In January 2002, the label, and subsequently Maggot Corps., collapsed, which forced the band to drop off a planned tour of Europe with Slipknot. After Downthesun failed to renegotiate a record deal with Warner Music Group, they shopped the album around to a variety of labels. After A&R rep Monte Conner heard the record, and with some help from Shawn Crahan, the band was able to negotiate a new contract with Roadrunner Records in May 2002 and announced their signing to the label on June 24, 2002. A music video for the song "Medicated" was also released on the band's website.

Downthesun then participated in their first official tour, the H82K2 Tour, which saw them perform as an opener for Slayer and In Flames from August to September 2002. Their debut album was finally released on October 1, 2002, and reached number 37 on the Billboard Top Heatseekers chart; it went on to sell 50,000 copies worldwide. Downthesun promoted the record by participating in tours with Soulfly and Slipknot as well as a New Years' Day show on December 31, 2002, with Murderdolls and Stone Sour.

=== Lineup changes and breakup (2003–2004) ===
By February 2003, Bruce Swink, Aaron Peltz, Danny Spain, and Anthony Stevens had left the band, and Downthesun had also left Roadrunner Records due to a lack of touring support. Despite this, Church and Collier maintained that they would be carrying on Downthesun. Thereafter, a new lineup was formed, featuring Matthew Burns on vocals, Cameron Fitzmaurice on drums, and Jason Martz and Nick Trotter on guitars. In September 2003, Downthesun stated on their website that they were planning to release an extended play on their own label, with distribution from an indie/major label. They shared seven snippets of the EP in December 2003. By February 2004, however, Downthesun had broken up. Lance Collier confirmed in May 2004 that the band was on an "extended hiatus" and said that there would only be new material if the band's original lineup was involved: "There was a real magic with the six of us and that's the only way downthesun will ever BE again".

=== Aftermath, reunion, and indefinite hiatus (2004–2011) ===
In the aftermath of downthesun's breakup, Collier and Church parted ways and set up their own bands. Collier launched The Hell Pigs, which he described as "southern rock-meets-hardcore with a twist". In May 2004, Church founded ADAYAFTER, which also featured Burns and Fitzmaurice. The band went on hiatus in October 2004, while Burns donated a kidney to his father. Anthony "Satone" Stevens reappeared in March 2007 as the vocalist of the progressive/hardcore band Common Diseases of Swine, which broke up in 2010. The original lineup of downthesun did not communicate with each other for seven years.

In May 2010, Peltz and Collier announced that they were reforming the band and were considering re-recording their debut album. The band slowly progressed through recording of a new album, which was tentatively known as Revelations, with a planned release date of 2012. However, on October 15, 2011, they announced via their official Facebook page that they were going on an indefinite hiatus while Collier got sober. Since then, the band has been inactive, though in 2017, Collier said that the door is still open for working on new music.

== Musical style and lyrics ==
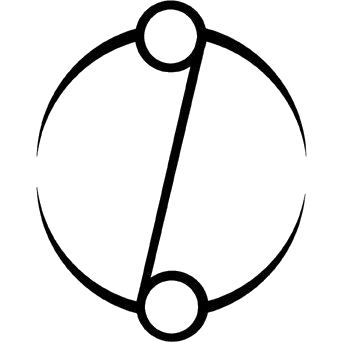
"The Six" logo, representing both the sun (6) and the moon (9), and the band members' equal good and evil energies.

Downthesun have been primarily labelled a nu metal band but have also been described as alternative metal, extreme metal, and sludge metal. AllMusic compared the band to Slipknot, stating that they "make the same kind of ugly alternative metal spliced with the visceral approach of death metal."

Downthesun's philosophy is known as "The Truth", which can be described as a rejection of Americana and the mainstream. Lance Collier described the band's philosophy in 2002: "We're ugly, we're fat and we go against everything that rock stardom is supposed to stand for: we are the truth." Shawn Crahan described downthesun as being "based on a simple foundation: 'Friend or foe. Truth or lies. On or off'."

Downthesun's musical and lyrical dynamic is largely based in mysticism, astrology, and numerology. The name "downthesun", according to Collier, refers to how "we [the band] draw down the energy of the sun to create our own circle of magic." Downthesun refer to themselves collectively as "The Six", referencing the fact of being a sextet and also the sun (6) and the moon (9). Collier described the band's lineup as being "three charged positive and three charged negative" in a "yin yang" fashion. This is best represented by the group's two lead vocalists, with Anthony "Satone" Stevens being "evil" and Aaron Peltz being "good", and often duelling with each other during songs. On "Lucas Toole", a song about serial killers Henry Lee Lucas and Ottis Toole, Peltz acts as a detective trying to find the murderous duo, while Satone acts as the two killers and taunts Peltz in his verses. According to Collier, the balance of good and evil in the band helps create "complete truth".

== Discography ==
Title	Album details	Peak chart positions
Title	Album details	US Heat.
2002	Downthesun: Released: October 1, 2002; Label: Roadrunner; Format: CD	37

== Band members ==
Final lineup

- Lance "Kuk" Collier – bass (1999–2004, 2010–2011)
- Nathan Church – keyboards, samples, vocals (1999–2004, 2010–2011)
- Aaron Peltz – vocals (1999–2003, 2010–2011)
- Anthony "Satone" Stevens – lead vocals (1999–2003, 2010–2011)
- Danny Spain – drums (1999–2003, 2010–2011)
- Bruce Swink – guitar (1999–2003, 2010–2011)

Past members

- Neil Godfrey – session guitar (2001)
- Jason Martz – guitar (2003–2004)
- Nick Trotter – guitar (2003–2004)
- Cameron Fitzmaurice – drums (2003–2004)
- Matthew Burns – lead vocals (2003–2004)
