= Downthesun (album) =

Studio album by Downthesun
- Released: October 1, 2002
- Recorded: May-June, 2001
- Studios: The Warehouse Studio, Vancouver, B.C.
- Genre: Nu metal
- Length: 53:04
- Label: Roadrunner
- Producer: Garth Richardson

Singles from Downthesun
- 1. "Medicated" Released: June 2002

Downthesun (stylised in lowercase) is the only studio album by American nu metal band Downthesun, released on October 1, 2002 by Roadrunner Records.

== Background ==
The album's development consisted of a six-week process in late 2001 at Canadian studio The Warehouse, in Vancouver, British Columbia. Garth "GGGarth" Richardson served as the producer, and Shawn Crahan as executive producer. Although Bruce Swink is credited as guitarist, his parts were actually recorded by Ultraspank and Lo-Pro guitarist Neil Godfrey, due to Swink breaking his hand during a fight just before recording began.

The members hoped for an early 2002 release, however the band's original label, Maggot Recordings, collapsed due to distributor London-Sire Records being shut down. This resulted in the album seeing a long delay. It was eventually released on October 1 through Roadrunner Records.

== Reception ==
Professional ratings
Review scores
Source	Rating
AllMusic	4/5 stars
Blistering	5/10
The Encyclopedia of Popular Music	3/5 stars
Hit Parader	B−
Metal.de	7/10
Metal Hammer	7/10
Rock Hard	5.5/10

Music website Unearthed praised the album, stating it to be "a fiery display of Midwestern aggression. Fusing sludge and aggro, the result is total, brilliant mayhem" and also compared its sound to that of Slipknot and Mudvayne. A fairly review came from antiMusic, who accused the album of being unoriginal and comparing the vocal performances to other musicians associated with nu metal such as Jonathan Davis and Max Cavalera. Metalrage compared the album to Slipknot's Iowa (2001).

== Track listing ==
No.	Title	Length
1.	"Medicated"	3:50
2.	"We All Die"	3:23
3.	"Enslaved"	3:34
4.	"Lucas Toole"	4:34
5.	"Zero"	0:30
6.	"Pure American Filth"	3:26
7.	"Pitiful"	2:11
8.	"Scapegoat"	2:57
9.	"Listen"	4:52
10.	"Eye Confide"	4:34
11.	"Jars"	3:37
12.	"Revelations"	15:30
Total length:		53:04

Japanese edition bonus tracks
No.	Title	Length
13.	"Lost"	3:34
14.	"Six"	4:16

Unreleased tracks and demos
No.	Title	Length
0.	"Down" (Available through a non-public SoundCloud page.)	3:26

== Personnel ==
=== Downthesun ===
- Nathan Church – keyboards, samples
- Anthony "Satone" Stevens – vocals
- Aaron Peltz – vocals
- Bruce Swink – guitar (credited but does not perform on the album)
- Lance "Kuk" Collier – bass
- Danny Spain – drums

=== Other duties ===
- Garth Richardson – production
- Shawn Crahan – executive production, art direction, photography, design
- Michael "Elvis" Baskette – mixing
- Dean Maher – engineering
- Ben Kaplan – digital editing
- Chris Vaughan-Jones – production coordinator
- Stephen Marcussen – mastering
- Stefan Seksis – photography
- Neil Godfrey - session guitar (uncredited)

== Charts ==
Chart (2002)	Peak position
US Top Heatseekers Albums (Billboard)	37
