= Terrortory =

Studio album by Halloween
- Released: February 25, 2012
- Genre: Heavy metal
- Length: 72:11
- Label: Motor City Metal Records, Pure Steel Records

Halloween chronology
Horror Fire (2006)	Terrortory (2012)

Professional ratings
Review scores
Source	Rating
DangerDog	3.5/5 stars
Hard Rock Haven	(8/10)
Metal-Rules.com	3/5 stars
Sea of Tranquillity	4/5 stars
The Rocktologist	(19/20)

Terrortory is the fifth studio album from the Detroit-based heavy metal band Halloween. It was released in February 2012.

== History ==
Most of the songs on Terrortory were written around the same time as the songs from the group's previous studio album Horror Fire. However, a few tracks are older. The songs "Not One", "Say Your Prayers", and "Images Quite Horrible" were written in 1990–1991, and "Caught In The Webs" was written in 1983 before the band's debut, Don't Metal With Evil. The song titled "Darkside, Inside" was originally recorded for the 2003 compilation Tricks, Treats And Other Tales From The Crypt. The song titled "Where's Michael?" was originally written for Rob Zombie's Halloween movie, but it did not make it on to the soundtrack.

== Track listing ==
No.	Title	Length
1.	"Traipsing Through the Blood"	5:29
2.	"At the Gates" (Instrumental)	1:27
3.	"Terrortory"	4:46
4.	"Images Quite Horrible"	3:52
5.	"Her Ghost Comes Out to Play"	4:28
6.	"Caught in the Webs"	4:12
7.	"Scare You"	4:08
8.	"Not One"	8:35
9.	"Darkside, Inside"	3:36
10.	"Re-Inventing Fear"	4:49
11.	"I Lie Awake"	5:15
12.	"Hands Around My Throat"	4:36
13.	"Say Your Prayers"	3:55
14.	"Where Is Michael?"	6:30
15.	"Dead on..."	4:23
16.	"Into the Afterlife" (Instrumental)	2:10

== Personnel ==
- Brian Thomas – vocals
- Donny Allen – guitars
- Don Guerrier – guitars
- George Neal – bass
- Rob Brug – drums
