= I Refuse (Five Finger Death Punch song) =

2025 song by Five Finger Death Punch

"I Refuse" (2025)

Single by Five Finger Death Punch featuring Maria Brink

from the album Best of (Vol. 1)
- Released: May 16, 2025
- Recorded: February 2025
- Length: 3:41
- Label: Better Noise
- Songwriters: Ivan Moody; Kane Churko; Jeremy Spencer
- Producer: Five Finger Death Punch

Five Finger Death Punch singles chronology
"This Is the Way" (2024)	"I Refuse" (2025) (2025)	"The End (featuring Babymetal)" (2025)

Lyric video
- "I Refuse (2025 version)" on YouTube

"I Refuse (2025 version)" is a re-recorded version of the 2018 song "I Refuse" by American heavy metal band Five Finger Death Punch. It features guest vocals from Maria Brink of the American rock band In This Moment. The song was released on May 16, 2025, as a single from their compilation album, 20 Years of Five Finger Death Punch – Best of Volume 1. It reached number one on the Billboard Mainstream Rock Airplay chart.

== Background and release ==
According to guitarist Zoltan Bathory, Five Finger Death Punch and In This Moment had connections dating back to their early careers in Los Angeles, including through the band Deadset. The band added guest vocals from Maria Brink, whom Bathory said was chosen because of their shared history. Brink recorded her parts a couple of days after being approached while she was in Las Vegas. "I Refuse" was initially intended to be a single from And Justice for None, but was not released as one. "I Refuse" has been described as a fan favorite, and was re-recorded for the Best Of – Volume 1 compilation. Brink previously collaborated with the band on "Anywhere but Here" in 2013.

The 2025 version of "I Refuse" was released as the first single from the compilation album. It was the first re-recorded song released from the project. According to Billboard, the original recording experienced increased streaming and airplay after the release of the re-recorded version.

== Lyric video ==
A lyric video was released alongside the single. The video shows two figures moving through cities, cemeteries, and battlefields, alongside imagery of gods and a largely still world.

== Track listing ==
"I Refuse" (featuring Maria Brink of In This Moment) [2025 version] – single
No.	Title	Writer(s)	Composer(s)	Length
1.	"I Refuse" (featuring Maria Brink of In This Moment – 2025 version (explicit))	Ivan Moody; Kane Churko; Jeremy Spencer	Jason Hook; Kevin Churko; Zoltan Bathory	3:41
2.	"Bad Company" (2025 version)	Paul Rodgers; Simon Kirke		4:21
3.	"Jekyll and Hyde" (2025 version (explicit))	Kevin Churko; Moody; Bathory; Hook; Spencer		3:26
Total length:				11:28

== Chart performance ==
It reached number one on the Billboard Mainstream Rock Airplay chart, becoming the band's 12th consecutive and 16th overall leader. The song also marked the first No. 1 airplay single for Maria Brink.

== Personnel ==
Credits adapted from Apple Music.

Five Finger Death Punch

- Zoltan Bathory – guitars, composer
- Ivan Moody – lead vocals, songwriter
- Chris Kael – bass
- Charlie Engen – drums
- Andy James – guitars, co-producer, mastering engineer

Additional credits

- Maria Brink – guest vocals
- Ricky Bonazza – background vocals, co-producer, engineer
- Kane Churko – songwriter
- Jeremy Spencer – songwriter
- Five Finger Death Punch – producer
- Jason Hook – composer
- Chris Lord-Alge – mixer

== Charts ==
=== Weekly charts ===
Weekly chart performance for "I Refuse (featuring Maria Brink)"
Chart (2025)	Peak position
US Rock & Alternative Airplay (Billboard)	15
US Mainstream Rock Airplay (Billboard)	1

=== Year-end charts ===
Year-end chart performance for "I Refuse (feat. Maria Brink)"
Chart (2025)	Position
US Mainstream Rock Airplay (Billboard)	35
