= 1031 (disambiguation) =

AD 1031 was a common year starting on Friday of the Julian calendar.

1031 may also refer to:

- 1031 (number)
- 1031 BC, a year in the 20th century BC
- 1031 exchange, a transaction under US law
- 1031, a Number of Things From..., an album by the Detroit band Halloween
