= The End (Five Finger Death Punch song) =

2025 song by Five Finger Death Punch

"The End" (2025)

Single by Five Finger Death Punch featuring Babymetal

from the album Best of (Vol. 2)
- Released: September 5, 2025
- Length: 3:42
- Label: Better Noise
- Songwriters: Ivan Moody; Kevin Churko; Zoltan Bathory; Andy James; Charlie Engen; Chris Kael
- Producer: Churko

Five Finger Death Punch singles chronology
"I Refuse (featuring Maria Brink)" (2025)	"The End" (2025) (2025)

Babymetal singles chronology
"My Queen" (2025)	"The End (2025)" (2025)

Lyric video
- "The End (2025 version)" on YouTube

"The End" is a song by American heavy metal band Five Finger Death Punch originally released on their 2022 album, AfterLife. In 2025, the band released a re-recorded version of the song, featuring Japanese kawaii metal band Babymetal. Released on September 5, 2025, as a single from their compilation album 20 Years of Five Finger Death Punch – Best of Volume 2, it reached number one on the Billboard Mainstream Rock Airplay chart.

== Background and release ==
Babymetal vocalist Su-metal said that Babymetal and Five Finger Death Punch had previously performed at the same festival in 2015, and that she sang Japanese lyrics inspired by and based on the original lyrics, spending time experimenting to find what kind of voice would best suit the track. The original version of the song appeared as the closing track on the 2022 album AfterLife.

The 2025 version of "The End", featuring Babymetal, was released as the lead single from the compilation album Best Of – Volume 2. A lyric video for the song was released alongside the single. It was among several songs re-recorded for the collection after the sale of the band's original master recordings.

== Composition ==
The 2025 version is modeled similarly to the original up front, including its acoustic introduction, while Su-metal performs the second verse in Japanese based on the original lyrics.

== Reception ==
The song was included in a list of recommended Five Finger Death Punch tracks by Wall of Sound. It was reported as the first song featuring Japanese lyrics to enter U.S. Active Rock radio.

== Track listing ==
"The End" (featuring Babymetal) [2025 version] – single
No.	Title	Writer(s)	Composer(s)	Length
1.	"The End" (featuring Babymetal – 2025 version)	Zoltan Bathory; Kevin Churko; Andy James; Charlie Engen; Chris Kael; Ivan Moody		3:42
2.	"Hell to Pay" (2025 version)	Churko; Moody; Bathory; Jason Hook; Jeremy Spencer		3:08
3.	"M.I.N.E (End This Way)" (2025 version)		Hook; Spencer; Bathory; Churko; Kane Churko; Moody	4:03
Total length:				10:54

== Promotion ==
Members of Five Finger Death Punch and Babymetal appeared together at a plaque presentation at the Intuit Dome in Los Angeles to mark the song's chart success in Japan and the United States.

== Chart performance ==
The song reached No. 1 on the Billboard Mainstream Rock Airplay chart, becoming Five Finger Death Punch's 17th leader and 13th consecutive No. 1 on the chart. It also marked the first time a Japanese act, as well as the first act from Asia, topped the chart, with Babymetal as a featured artist. The song also topped the Japanese iTunes Metal chart, and reached No. 18 on the Japanese all-genres chart.

== Personnel ==
Credits adapted from Apple Music.

Five Finger Death Punch

- Zoltan Bathory – guitars, songwriter
- Ivan Moody – lead vocals, songwriter
- Chris Kael – bass, songwriter
- Charlie Engen – drums, songwriter
- Andy James – guitars, songwriter

Additional credits

- Babymetal – featured artist
- Kevin Churko – songwriter, producer, mixing engineer

== Charts ==
Weekly chart performance for "The End (featuring Babymetal)"
Chart (2025)	Peak position
US Rock & Alternative Airplay (Billboard)	16
US Mainstream Rock Airplay (Billboard)	1
