= Until We Meet Again =

Until We Meet Again may refer to:

- Until We Meet Again (1950 film), a Japanese film by Tadashi Imai
- Until We Meet Again (1952 film), a West German romantic drama film
- Until We Meet Again (EP), by White Noise Owl, 2014
- "Until We Meet Again", a song by Diana Ross from the 1999 album Every Day Is a New Day
- Until We Meet Again (TV series), a 2019 Thai television drama series

== See also ==
- "If We Ever Meet Again", a 2010 song by Timbaland and Katy Perry
- "Till We Meet Again", a 1999 song by Mike Dierickx (as Push)
