= Disintegration Effect =

Studio album by Lo-Pro
- Released: May 14, 2013
- Recorded: January 2012 – March 2013
- Genre: Hard rock, industrial metal
- Length: 39:09
- Label: Independent
- Producer: Pete Murray

Lo-Pro chronology
The Beautiful Sounds of Revenge (2010)	Disintegration Effect (2013)	The Theory of Everything (2014)

Disintegration Effect is the third studio album by American hard rock band Lo-Pro. It was released on May 14, 2013. The album was a departure from the prior two Lo-Pro albums, while half of the album retained the band's usual melodic hard rock sound, half contained more screamed vocals more reminiscent of members Pete Murray and Neil Godfrey's prior band, Ultraspank.

== Background ==
After releasing two nu metal albums as members of Ultraspank, vocalist Pete Murray and guitarist Neil Godfrey formed a new band, Lo-Pro, in 2002. The band released their debut album, which featured a more mainstream, hard rock sound, Lo-Pro, on Geffen Records, but were dropped from their contract due to poor album sales. The band would spend seven years writing, recording, and re-recording a follow-up, The Beautiful Sounds of Revenge, which reflected upon the negative side of the music industry and the experience of losing their record deal, in 2010, and focused on a more raw sound, with Murray feeling the original release was overproduced due to record label pressure. After its release, the band changed directions and decided to release an acoustic album, although, as recording progressed, the music took more of an electronic sound as well, resulting in a sound so different from past albums that the band opted to release it under a pseudonym, Life On Planet 9, on their album Bittersweet in 2011. By 2012, Murray announced that the band would be returning to work under the "Lo-Pro" name again on a third studio album. However, unlike prior albums, where many songs were premiered months and even years before the album's release, Murray stated that the new album would be another shift in directions, and as such, they would not be releasing music much beforehand".

== Writing and recording ==
Writing sessions first began upon the band being asked if they would hypothetically be open to the prospect of writing a soundtrack for a "post apocalyptic cyborg type movie". The band, unfamiliar with working under the confine of a soundtrack or concept album mentality, decided to write a few songs and see how they felt about it. While the band would ultimately not do the soundtrack, the band would continue to use tracks from the session, "Soulless", "Wasteland", "Obedience", and "We Are The Ones" for Disintegration Effect, and similar themes throughout the rest of the album's recording process.

The band continued to record throughout 2012, although Murray later admitted that progress was slowed due to band members working on other projects, including concurrently working on a second Life On Planet 9 album, and contributing a few tracks to the Battlefield of the Mind soundtrack, the latter being a collaborative music project featuring band members of Staind, Megadeth, and Evanescence. While initially aiming for an early 2013 release, the album would be pushed back as Murray wrapped up contributing vocals to a few tracks for the Battlefield of the Mind soundtrack, including the tracks "No Words", "Tear It Down", and "Not Like You". Additionally, Murray and Godfrey would help perform some of the soundtrack live on April 24, 2013.

The album was entirely self-produced, with Murray even handling the album's production and mixing.

== Themes and composition ==
Spurring from the initial writing sessions where the band was contemplating the idea of providing a soundtrack for a post apocalyptic film, much of the album's lyrical content centers around the dependence of technology in the modern world. Murray had been influenced by his surroundings, stated he felt "...fascinated and horrified by our addiction to technology...Next time you're in a restaurant, look around at how many husband and wives, boyfriends/girlfriends or friends are on their phones looking at Facebook instead of enjoying each other's company. That's just the tip of the iceberg." The sentiment lead to more negative overtones, with fears that current trends could actually lead to that fictional "apocalyptic" scenario. Murray stated that the album could be epitomized by the lyrics "Freedom is dead" from the track "Obedience", which he stated"...is about defeat. The humans have lost the war and are now slaves to the machines."

Sonically, Murray stated that the band hadn't especially intended on making "their heaviest album yet", but that it just happened naturally with the subject matter. The album featured heavy, downtuned distorted guitars, electronic noises, and screamed vocals, more reminiscent of Ultraspank's sound, especially Progress, than past Lo-Pro releases. Murray eventually felt that longtime fans of his and Godfrey would enjoy the prospect of a throwback to their Ultraspank days.

== Release ==
Just before the concert Murray announced that the album's title would be Disintegration Effect, and that it would be released on May 14, 2013. The announcement was coupled with a brief, 20-second preview of the album, containing clips from the tracks "Give Me Life" and "Obedience". The opening track, "Give Me Life", was made available on the Battlefield of the Mind soundtrack a month prior to the release of Disintegration Effect. The band streamed the track "Soulless" a day prior to the album's release.

== Track listing ==
All lyrics are written by Pete Murray

No.	Title	Length
1.	"Give Me Life"	4:08
2.	"Wasteland"	2:55
3.	"We Are the Ones"	4:36
4.	"Bow Down"	4:05
5.	"Sheer Electronic"	4:10
6.	"Soulless"	3:02
7.	"Obedience"	5:00
8.	"Dig In"	4:07
9.	"Battle Song"	4:12
10.	"Farewell"	2:54
Total length:		39:09

== Reception and sales ==
AmpKicker gave the album a 9.5 of 10 album, praising the album's concept and sound, stating "It comes with a message and the power to open your eyes to how our society is destroying itself. Murray is at his peak and screams the hell out of this album. The thickness of Godfrey's guitar surrounds you and makes those speakers shake, and the drums are like a stampede through your eardrums. Belgium print magazine Rock Tribune gave the album a positive review as well, awarding it an 8.5 out of 10 rating.

Murray stated that the album charted to no. 94 on the iTunes charts on its release day, and that the band had already sold out of physical copies on the album's first day alone.

== Personnel ==
- Pete Murray – vocals, programming, mixing, mastering
- Neil Godfrey – guitar
- Pete Ricci – guitar
- Jerry Oliviera – bass
- Tommy Stewart – drums
