= Condition Critical (White Noise Owl album) =

Studio album by White Noise Owl
- Released: November 1, 2019
- Recorded: 2015–2016
- Studio: The Mix Room - Burbank, CA, Atrium Studio - Calabasas, CA
- Genre: Rock
- Label: Curtain Call Records
- Producer: Ben Grosse

White Noise Owl chronology
Until We Meet Again (2014)	Condition Critical (2019)

Singles from Condition Critical
- 1. "Something" Released: August 1, 2017; 2. "Maybe It's Time" Released: October 2019

Condition Critical is the debut full-length studio album by American rock band White Noise Owl. Initially due shortly after their debut EP Until We Meet Again, the release saw multiple delays before receiving its final release date, November 1, 2019. The album's first single, "Something, was released over two years prior to the album release, on August 1, 2017. The second single, "Maybe It's Time", was released in October 2019.

== Background ==
Four of the song's track's "Feed", "Bomber", "Are You Breathing", and "End Over End", all originate from the band's 2014 debut EP, Until We Meet Again. These initial sessions were quick and fruitful; guitarist Chris Shy contacted vocalist Pete Murray shortly after Lo-Pro's third studio album's release in 2013, and the EP was released in March 2014. The songs were written over emails between Shy and Murray, and after sessions went well, Murray recruited past Lo-Pro bassist John Fahnestock as bassist, while Shy recruited Evanescence drummer Will Hunt, a musician he had always desired to work with historically. The band did not all work together in one place until the first day of the songs recordings.

Work on a follow-up, full-length album started shortly after the EP's release, with the band entering the studio in August 2014. However, the band went quiet for over a year, with Hunt later giving an update in October 2015 that the band had been working on new material "for the better part of a year", but that progress was slow due to the members other commitments, complications with record labels, and wanting to take their time with perfecting the music. The album's initial 2015 release date was later delayed into 2016. The band again went quiet through 2016 and the first half of 2017, until August 2017. On August 1, the band released the album's first single, "Something", alongside a music video. The band also announced the album's name, Condition Critical, and a new release date - late 2017.

Despite the announcement, the album would not release that year, or 2018. In September 2019, a new release date was announced, November 1, 2019. A second single, "Maybe It's Time", was released in October 2019.

== Track listing ==
No.	Title	Length
1.	"Maybe It's Time"	4:11
2.	"Feed"	3:51
3.	"Angry Man"	5:02
4.	"Is Anyone Listening?"	4:32
5.	"Bomber"	4:07
6.	"Are You Breathing?"	5:29
7.	"Something"	4:17
8.	"End Over End"	4:34
9.	"I Know You Know"	4:18
10.	"This Has Just Begun"	7:20
11.	"."	2:40

== Personnel ==
Band

- Pete Murray - lead vocals
- Chris Shy - guitar
- John Fahnestock - bass
- Will Hunt - drums

Production

- Ben Grosse - production
- Paul Pavao - engineering
- Jamie Muhoberac - sound design
- Tom Baker - mastering
