= Victims of the Night =

Studio album by Halloween
- Released: 1997
- Recorded: 1986
- Genre: Heavy metal
- Length: 40:00
- Label: Molten Metal Records

Halloween chronology
| No One Gets Out (1991) | Victims of the Night (1997) | Horror Fire (2006) |

Victims of the Night is a 1997 studio album by American heavy metal band Halloween.

== Production 1986-1997 ==
Victims of the Night was intended to be a follow-up to the successful Don't Metal with Evil record. The album was recorded in 1986 in Ann Arbor, Michigan. Originally, the tracks "Candles" and "Come and Get It" were originally recorded for the album. Only 11 songs made it on to the album.

== Track listing ==
1997 release
| No. | Title | Length |
|---|---|---|
| 1. | "Intro" | 1:28 |
| 2. | "Welcome" | 4:07 |
| 3. | "Victims of the Night" | 3:22 |
| 4. | "No Place" | 5:02 |
| 5. | "Rest in Peace" | 2:34 |
| 6. | "Candy Caine" | 3:59 |
| 7. | "Nightmares" | 4:34 |
| 8. | "Angel" (instrumental) | 1:26 |
| 9. | "Love'Em and Loose'Em" | 4:46 |
| 10. | "Children of the Witches" | 2:45 |
| 11. | "Revelations 23:1 (The Dream)" | 5:44 |

Hidden bonus track on 2002 re-issue
| No. | Title | Length |
|---|---|---|
| 12. | "Halloween Night" (1986 demo, hidden track) |

Bonus tracks on 2010 re-release
| No. | Title | Length |
|---|---|---|
| 12. | "Come and Get It" (1986 demo) |
| 13. | "Victims of the Night" (DAoC-version 2006) |
| 14. | "Halloween Night" (1986 demo, hidden track) |
| 15. | "Victims of the Night" (video) |

== Personnel ==
- Brian Thomas – vocals
- Rick Craig – guitar
- George Neal – bass
- Bill Whyte – drums

Additional musicians

- Scott Schuster – keyboards
- Rob Tyner – backing vocals
