= Tommy Stewart =

American drummer

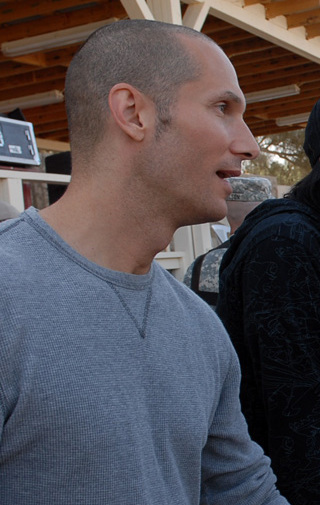
- Stewart with Everclear in 2008

Background information
- Also known as: Tommy Scott
- Genres: Alternative metal; nu metal; hard rock; heavy metal; alternative rock; post-grunge
- Occupation: Musician
- Instruments: Drums, percussion
- Years active: 1989–present
- Member of: Lo-Pro
- Formerly of: Godsmack; Fuel; Everclear; Lillian Axe; Halloween; Rusty Wright Band; Dharma Gypsys

Tommy Stewart is an American drummer, currently for the rock band Lo-Pro. He is best known for his work with the band Godsmack. He has also toured and recorded with a number of other bands including Detroit based metal band Halloween, glam rock band Lillian Axe, and alternative rock bands Fuel and Everclear.

== Early life ==
He grew up in the working-class city of Flint, Michigan, where at the age of ten he started playing in the school band.

In 1984 he graduated from Ainsworth High School (now Carman-Ainsworth High) in Flint.

== Career ==
In the 1980s, he drummed in local bands Bad Axe, Kody Lee, and Damage Inc.

Tommy (then known as Tommy Scott Stewart) joined Halloween in 1989, and recorded "The Vicious Demo" (also known as "Vicious Demonstration") which was first released on cassette in 1990, and was sold at their shows. The tracks were later released as "bonus tracks" on the band's remastered 2001 release No One Gets Out (reissued by Molten Metal U.S.A.). He left the band in 1990.

In 1993, he joined glam rock band Lillian Axe and played on their 1993 release Psychoschizophrenia. The band went on hiatus in mid-1990s after their Psychoschizophrenia tour, and band members started various sideprojects, one being The Bridge by then vocalist Ron Taylor where Tommy played drums on most of the CD.

Stewart was the original drummer of Godsmack. He had met the Godsmack frontman Sully Erna when he was playing in Lillian Axe and Sully was touring with his previous band Strip Mind. He joined Godsmack in 1995, left briefly, and returned in 1998 just before the band's debut album came out. He played with them for two multi-platinum selling albums, Godsmack and Awake. He co-wrote the single "Bad Religion" for the band's self-titled debut album with Sully Erna. Stewart also plays on the Godsmack single "I Stand Alone" which was first released on the Scorpion King soundtrack in 2002 and later appeared on the band's third studio album Faceless after his departure. He left the band in 2002 due to personal differences. The break-up has been described as amicable, but Erna, a drummer himself, who wrote the majority of drum parts and also recorded the drums on the debut album, admits that "I had a very set vision on where I wanted to go with music and after a while, in his defense, it just wore on him having no input in the band".

After leaving Godsmack, Stewart briefly joined ex-Van Halen and Extreme vocalist Gary Cherone's band Tribe of Judah as touring drummer.

In 2002 he joined vocalist Pete Murray and guitarist Neil Godfrey from Ultraspank to form Lo-Pro. Lo-Pro was signed to Staind and Aaron Lewis's record label 413 Records (a subsidiary of Geffen Records), but the band was dropped after one album.

In January 2005 he played drums on the CD Ain't No Good Life by Rusty Wright Blues. The CD was released in August 2006 and it features 13 songs in a blues/southern rock style. Tommy and Rusty were old bandmates from much earlier projects, but this was the first time doing the blues genre. Tommy does casual dates with Rusty Wright as guest drummer.

With little activity by Lo-Pro after touring behind their debut album, Stewart did some shows with Pennsylvania-based alternative rock band Fuel as a replacement drummer in mid-2005 after the band parted ways with their longtime drummer Kevin Miller. He also helped guitarist and chief songwriter Carl Bell and bassist Jeff Abercrombie audition singers after Brett Scallions' departure in 2006. Stewart was unable to participate in the recording of the Fuel album Angels & Devils due to other commitments, but was invited to join the band after the cd was completed, but not yet released. Stewart toured with the band in support of their latest album from May 2007 until early 2008.

Since Fuel had not been touring for a while, Stewart joined Portland rock band Everclear in August 2008, replacing Brett Snyder on drums. Stewart departed from Everclear in 2009 after the recording of their 2009 release In A Different Light when most of the band lineup was jettisoned by Art Alexakis. By mid-2009, he began working with Lo-Pro again to finish up, and tour in support of, their two releases, the Letting Go EP and The Beautiful Sounds of Revenge.

Tommy's current project is S.U.N. (Something Unto Nothing) with vocalist Sass Jordan, bassist Michael Devin, and guitarist Brian Tichy. Marty O'Brien replaced bassist Devin in 2012.

== Gear ==
(with Godsmack)

Drums: DW Ebony Satin Oil Finish

- 20" × 18" Bass drum
- 14" × 4½" Solid Maple Snare
- 10"-12" Toms
- 16" Floor Tom

Cymbals: Zildjian

- 14" Remix Crash
- 14" A Mastersound Hi-Hats
- Zil Bel Large
- 18" Z Custom Crash
- 10" EFX Splash
- 22" Z Custom Mega Bell Ride
- 20" A Crash/Ride Brilliant
- 18" Z Custom Rocker Crash
- 20" A China High

Electronics:

- 10" ddrum pads

Vic Firth drumsticks

DW pedals and hardware

== Discography ==
=== Halloween ===
- Vicious Demos (1990)
- No One Gets Out (2002 Reissue on bonus tracks From Vicious Demos Cassette)

=== Lillian Axe ===
- Psychoschizophrenia (1993)

=== The Bridge ===
- Demo (1997)

=== Godsmack ===
- All Wound Up (1997) (as touring drummer)
- Godsmack (1998)
- Awake (2000)
- "I Stand Alone" (Single) (2002)

=== Lo-Pro ===
- Lo-Pro (2003)
- Letting Go EP (2009)
- The Beautiful Sounds of Revenge (2010)
- Bittersweet (2011) (released under pseudonym "Life on Planet 9")
- Disintegration Effect (2013)

=== Rusty Wright Blues ===
- Ain't No Good Life (2006)

=== Fuel ===
- Angels & Devils (2007)
- "Wasted Time" (Music Video) (2007)

=== Everclear ===
- In a Different Light (2009)

=== Dharma Gypsys ===
- Volume One: Music for Yoga, Meditation and General House Cleaning (2010)
