= Letting Go (EP) =

EP by Lo-Pro
- Released: July 14, 2009 (limitedly at concerts); October 21, 2009 (Digital)
- Recorded: 2005–09
- Genre: Hard rock
- Length: 24:07
- Label: 413
- Producers: Aaron Lewis; Angus Cooke; Lo-Pro

Lo-Pro chronology
Lo-Pro (2003)	Letting Go (2009)	The Beautiful Sounds of Revenge (2010)

Letting Go is the EP of Lo-Pro, initially available only during concerts in July and August during the "Stimulate This" Tour with Staind, Shinedown, Chevelle and Halestorm. It was reported to be released digitally in September 2009, but was eventually pushed back to October 21, 2009. This is their first formal release of music in six years, since their self-titled album in 2003. In the past, Lo-Pro has claimed to be working on "over 26 songs" for a future release. Despite this, five of the six tracks on it were later put on their full-length album The Beautiful Sounds of Revenge, to be released on June 8, 2010.

== History ==
Lo-Pro's starting work on new material dates back to 2005, shortly after they were dropped from the Geffen Record label. In summer 2005, they showed their first example of this new material when they streamed a copy of a new song, "Ingenious", from their Myspace, which, in the end, was not put on the EP. They continued stream songs in various fashions in the coming years as well, some making the EP, others not. A demo of Breathe was streamed from their Myspace in the summer of 2006 and a demo of "Texas" was starting summer 2007.

Additionally, in early 2008, a full concert from 2007 was made available for streaming, which included live acoustic renditions of "Hang On", "Today", and "Letting Go". One other new song, "All I Have", was also performed at these concerts too, but was not put on the EP. On occasion, Aaron Lewis of Staind had also played on live versions of "Letting Go".

All songs except "Alive" were reworked and re-recorded in the studio before being released on the EP; "Alive" was the only track not to have been streamed beforehand in either live or demo form. It was, however, one of the songs made available to download for free shortly before the band started touring, in which the band started selling the EP at concerts. The EP versions of "Alive", "Texas", and "Breathe' had been made available for free download on July 4, 2009.

It was released physically at concerts on July 14, 2009, and digitally on October 21, 2009. Surprisingly, "Alive" was at the last second, taken off of the EP for its iTunes release. Singer Pete Murray later claimed this was due to its inclusion on Lo-Pro's upcoming June 8, 2010 release The Beautiful Sounds of Revenge although it was later revealed that all songs except for "Today" were indeed put on it. *The Beautiful Sounds of Revenge contains every EP track, except "Today". The songs that were on both releases are identical to each other, with no noticeable differences.

According to the band's Myspace bio, it appears the EP's title has a double meaning. It refers not only the "letting go" of a personal relationship, but also to the traditional ways of releasing material in the music industry. (Referring to digital releases, not using major record labors, using social networking websites, etc.) Pete Murray said in an interview:

“The business has changed so much. The technology alone allows you to get your music directly to your fans. It’s a very exciting time to be a musician if you can just let go of how things used to be.”

== Sound ==
While Lo-Pro certainly did not drastically change their sound, differences between their self-titled album and the EP are noticeable. Singer Pete Murray has referenced before that he believes the self-titled album was overproduced, and as a result, the EP sounds does have less of a cluttered sound. Additionally, the album is somewhat softer than their original effort, which is understandable considering several of the song were consistently performed acoustic.

In an article on Tunelab, Pete Murray said of the EP's sound:

We’ve always had the ‘formula’ applied to our records: big producer, big studio, big money,” explains singer Pete Murray. “We’ve always been proud of the result but when you spend that much money right from the beginning, you feel like you’re trying to outrun this dark cloud all the time. We’ve been itching to make a record on our own forever and at this point in our career, we really felt like we were ready.”

“We stripped all these songs down and played them live as gut wrenching acoustic songs in random little jazz clubs, and they totally worked. It was super fun to then build them back up as electric versions. We knew they already worked so we had a way more minimalistic approach on these recordings than in the past.

== Track listing ==
All lyrics written by Pete Murray

EP
No.	Title	Length
1.	"Texas"	3:35
2.	"Hang On"	3:50
3.	"Alive"	3:34
4.	"Today"	3:54
5.	"Breathe"	4:04
6.	"Letting Go"	5:10
Total length:		24:07

- "Alive" was omitted from iTunes digital release

== Song differences ==
Texas - The demo version of "Texas" was available from the band's MySpace since summer 2007. It featured more emphasis on a heavier, more aggressive guitar riff. The songs baseline in the EP version is very similar to the original guitar parts. Additionally, the bridge was shortened slightly in the EP version.

Hang On - The band recorded a soundboard live acoustic version of this song before the EP in 2007. While the EP version retains the same song structure, it is fully electric and features fast paced guitar, bass and drum parts, with and extended outro.

Alive - No previous versions of this song are available for comparison.

Today - The band recorded a soundboard live acoustic version of this song before the EP in 2007. The EP version is largely the same outside of some electric guitar additions.

Breathe - A demo version of "Breathe" was available from the band's MySpace since summer 2006. The EP version features a more polished sound. The EP version also features an extended and more melodic bridge.

Letting Go - The band recorded a soundboard live acoustic version of this song before the EP in 2007. The EP version is largely the same as live version, as it was kept primarily as an acoustic song for the EP.

== Reception ==
While response has been somewhat minimal due to the six years between releases in music and minimal advertisement without the support of a record label, its reception has been relatively positive. The main criticism has been about the length of time it took to release the CD, and that it is only a five/six track EP after such a length of time, rather than the actual music itself, which has received praise.

== Personnel ==
- Pete Murray - vocals
- Neil Godfrey - guitar
- Pete Ricci - guitar
- Jerry Oliviera - bass
- Tommy Stewart - drums
