= Horror Fire =

Studio album by Halloween
- Released: June 6, 2006
- Genre: Heavy metal
- Length: 68:06
- Label: Molten Metal Records

Halloween chronology
Victims of the Night (1997)	Horror Fire (2006)	Terrortory (2012)

Horror Fire is the fourth studio album by the Detroit-based heavy metal band Halloween. It was released on June 6, 2006.

== Background ==
Horror Fire was produced by new drummer Rob Brug. The album marks the return of original bassist George Neal. It is also notable as Halloween's first recording with Brug.

== Track listing ==
No.	Title	Length
1.	"I Am"	2:11
2.	"Wake Up Screaming"	5:41
3.	"Halloween Night"	3:32
4.	"The Crush"	3:36
5.	"Exist"	5:33
6.	"Candles"	4:13
7.	"The Seer"	3:57
8.	"The End and the Beginning"	1:52
9.	"Nobody's Home"	5:08
10.	"Rage"	2:29
11.	"Ways of Man"	3:59
12.	"Head Against a Wall"	2:39
13.	"Coming to Life"	3:21
14.	"Sin"	0:46
15.	"Go to Hell" (Alice Cooper cover)	4:28
16.	"Fire Still Burns"	3:50
17.	"The Battle"	4:04
18.	"Fighting Words"	5:02
19.	"H.F.B.D.T.Y."	1:45
Total length:		68:06

== Personnel ==
- Brian Thomas - vocals
- Donny Allen - guitar
- George Neal - bass guitar, keyboards
- Rob Brug - drums
