= Bittersweet (Life On Planet 9 album) =

2011 studio album by Life On Planet 9

Studio album by Life On Planet 9/Lo-Pro
- Released: August 20, 2011
- Recorded: 2007–2011
- Genre: Acoustic rock, electronic rock, alternative rock
- Length: 42:16
- Label: Independent
- Producer: Pete Murray

Life On Planet 9/Lo-Pro chronology
The Beautiful Sounds of Revenge (2010)	Bittersweet (2011)	Disintegration Effect (2013)

Bittersweet is the first studio album by Life On Planet 9, the pseudonym used by American hard rock band Lo-Pro when releasing music of a more experimental nature. The album was released on August 20, 2011. The album's origins trace back as far as 2007, when Lo-Pro participated in an acoustic tour with Staind frontman Aaron Lewis. Tracks started as acoustic rock material, but as they developed, they gained further ambient and electronic elements. The sound strayed so far from their original hard rock sound that they decided to release it under another name.

== Writing and recording ==
Lo-Pro formed after members Pete Murray and Neil Godfrey started making music together after the breakup of their prior band, Ultraspank. Under the Lo-Pro name, they started recording demo material, which attracted the attention of Staind frontman Aaron Lewis, who was able to get them signed to Geffen Records. However, after the release of their first album, Lo-Pro in 2003, and recording a short 3 track acoustic CD for exclusive release on Napster, they were dropped from the label in 2004. The band would stay together, but the band would be relatively quiet for a number of years.

In 2007, the band began to focus on a more acoustic-driven songs. Upon Aaron Lewis wrapping up touring in support Staind's Chapter V album, Lo-Pro joined him for a short acoustic tour. The band debuted a number of songs in acoustic form, including "Letting Go", "Hang On", "Today", and "All I Have". Additionally, the band started another Myspace page up under the name of "Lo-Pro Acoustic", and streamed several new acoustic studio tracks, including "Clean the Slate", the otherwise unreleased "This is Not Goodbye", and a cover of Filter's song "Consider This". In early 2008, Murray announced that the band had been working on recording a full-fledged acoustic album, and intended to release it in early 2008. However, at this point, the band had been out of the public eye for a number of years, and felt their comeback album should be closer to their original sound. As such, they decided to proceed with another electric album, delaying the release of the acoustic album. Unfortunately, the band would be unhappy with the end product of the electric album, feeling it sounded more like a polished demo, prompting them to have further recording sessions through 2008 and 2009 with Angus Cooke, pushing the acoustic album even farther out.

Upon the release of their second studio album, The Beautiful Sounds of Revenge in 2010, the band was able to return to finishing up the acoustic album. However, the band had reworked a number of the tracks they had been performing acoustically into full-band, electric tracks for The Beautiful Sounds of Revenge, so the band needed to write many more tracks before having enough original material for another album. Upon working on further material, it retained its acoustic material, but also moved into more ambient and electronic directions as well. As such, the band decided to record it under a new name, called Life On Planet 9, a name very similar to Lo-Pro, but Murray confirmed it to be what the "Lo-Pro acoustic album" evolved into, and that it was recorded entirely by Lo-Pro members; Pete Murray, Pete Ricci, and Neil Godfrey. The track "Wheels" was actually demoed as a Lo-Pro track back in 2002 when Murray and Godfrey first started creating Lo-Pro demos in an effort to attract the attention of record labels, although the track had had an industrial rock sound and was ultimately not one of the tracks selected to be re-recorded for their self-titled debut album.

== Sound and composition ==
Despite being billed as their "acoustic" record, the album also contains many elements of electronic rock as well. While its sound moved into ambient directions as well later in recording, the electronic touches were even present in the band's early 2007 b-side material "This is Not Goodbye" and "Consider This". The album features emotional downtempo elements with acoustic guitars with electronic beats, ambient keyboard textures and dreamy vocals. While the sound is driven by acoustic guitars, songs frequently feature clean electric guitar tones in the background or climax of a number of tracks. "When" and the closing three tracks additionally feature minimal distorted guitar riffs, but more as a backing beat than a prominent feature. Songs sometimes veer into a progressive rock-like sound as well.

== Release ==
The band streamed the first track from the album's final sessions, "Sweet Silence", on to YouTube in December 2010. A clip of the track "C U Soon NY" was released a little prior to the album's release in August as well. The full album would be released later on August 20, 2012, physically at a concert in Northampton, Maryland, and digitally on iTunes. The show was the second annual benefit concert in support of Aaron Lewis's "It Takes a Community" charity foundation, where the band performed along with Lewis himself and Corey Taylor of Slipknot and Stone Sour. No formal singles were released, although an official video for the track "Line Stepper" was released by the band.

== Reception ==
The album has received largely positive reviews. Melodic praised it as a "wonderful album that grows with every spin", comparing it favorably to "...ambient, dreamy, epic and acoustic based songs that breathes the prog of Camel, the melancholy of Vast and the electronic rock of Filter". The album closer "Line Stepper" has been noted as a standout track.

== Track listing ==
All lyrics are written by Pete Murray; all music is composed by Pete Murray, Neil Godfrey, and Pete Ricci.

No.	Title	Length
1.	"Holding On"	4:03
2.	"Sweet Silence"	3:46
3.	"Waiting"	3:06
4.	"Innocent"	5:39
5.	"C U Soon NY"	3:51
6.	"When"	4:40
7.	"Wheels"	4:32
8.	"Bittersweet"	3:44
9.	"Goodbye"	4:04
10.	"Line Stepper"	4:51

B-sides

- "This is Not Goodbye"
- "Consider This" (Filter cover)
- "This Way"
- "Clean the Slate" (Two separate acoustic recordings were streamed in 2007 and 2010 by the band, although the track was ultimately only released in electric full band form on The Beautiful Sounds of Revenge.)

== Personnel ==
- Pete Murray - vocals, electronic programming
- Neil Godfrey - guitars
- Pete Ricci - guitars
