= Lo-Pro =

American rock band

- Origin: Los Angeles, California, U.S.
- Genres: Alternative rock; hard rock; alternative metal
- Years active: 2002–present
- Labels: Geffen; 413; Rocket Science
- Members: Pete Murray; Neil Godfrey; Pete Ricci; Tommy Stewart; Jerry Oliviera
- Past members: John Fahnestock

Lo-Pro is an American rock band formed in 2002 by Pete Murray and Neil Godfrey after the disbandment of their previous band, Ultraspank, in 2001. After attracting the attention of Aaron Lewis of Staind, the band signed to a major record label, Geffen Records, and released their debut album, Lo-Pro in 2003. After a year of touring in support of the album, they would be dropped from their label. The band stayed together, but it would be almost six years until any further music releases, with the band opting to record and re-record several album's worth of material, participate in side-projects, and perform live shows prior to finalizing new material for release.

The long gap in releases in turn lead to a number of consecutive releases in the following years, including the Letting Go EP in 2009, a second album, The Beautiful Sounds of Revenge, in 2010, and an acoustic album, Bittersweet, under the pseudonym "Life on Planet 9", in 2011. The band briefly returned to working under the Lo-Pro name to release a third studio album, Disintegration Effect, in 2013, before returning to the "Life On Planet 9" moniker to release The Theory of Everything in 2014, and Higher in January 2017. Concurrently, Murray and ex-bassist John Fahnestock have also started up and released music under a new band called White Noise Owl as well.

== History ==
=== Formation and Lo-Pro (2002–2004) ===
In the late 1990s, vocalist Pete Murray and guitarist Neil Godfrey formed and recorded two albums in the band Ultraspank. After the poor sales of their second album, Progress, the band parted ways with their record label and ultimately disbanded. Initially burned out with the music industry, Murray and Godfrey eventually met up and began working on music together, refreshed being able to work without the pressures of dealing with a label. The two put together a demo album in one of their bedrooms, where they recorded everything between the two of them; Godfrey handling all guitar work and Murray handling vocals and all other aspects through programming in Pro Tools. They were able to attract the attention of Aaron Lewis, of Staind, who had just started up his own vanity record label, "413 Records", at Geffen Records. Lewis made the band the first to be signed to the label, stating that he felt even the early rough demo sounded "better than 80 percent of the albums released today."

After being signed based on the demo alone, Murray and Godfrey needed to assemble a full band for the band's for recording their debut album. The band recruited Tommy Stewart, the previous drummer for Godsmack, as their drummer. Additionally, John Fahnestock, who had met Murray and Godfrey while touring alongside Ultraspank in the band Snot at Ozzfest 1998, was also recruited as the bassist. The band rounded out the lineup with second guitarist Pete Ricci.

With the band assembled, recording for the album began in January 2003. The band worked with music producer Don Gilmore, who had previously worked with Linkin Park and Pearl Jam. The band recorded for the first half of the year, and then released Lo-Pro on September 30, 2003. It peaked at no. 9 on the Billboard Top Heatseekers chart, and stayed on the chart for two weeks. One single was released, "Sunday", which peaked at no. 20 on the Billboard Mainstream Rock Tracks and no. 27 on Modern Rock Tracks. The track also appeared in the 989 Studios game MLB 2004 for the PlayStation 2. Murray said of the single "It's definitely not about watching football or going to church. It's really about how I've never had anything to look forward to on Sunday. I never liked going to school or going to a job, and when Sunday comes, you just know things are gonna hit the wringer the following day." The band had planned on releasing a second single, bassist Jonathan Fahnestock had even asked the internet community to vote for which track it would be, but it never surfaced. However, the track "Ignition" was featured in the 2004 PC game The Ultimate Dodge Garage.

The band toured extensively alongside Staind and Three Days Grace into 2004. Additionally, on April 24, 2004, they released a 3 track acoustic EP exclusively through Napster, containing acoustic takes of "Sunday", "Ignition", and "Not Me". However, by June 2004, the band announced that they had been dropped by Geffen Records. Despite this, the band confirmed that they were still on good terms with Lewis and Staind, were not disbanding, and were in fact already working on writing and recording more music.

=== Letting Go and The Beautiful Sounds of Revenge (2005–2010) ===
After the loss of their record label, the band would stay together, but would not formally release music again until 2009. The band would go several years with minimal outward communication with the public, but would instead commonly release a new song for internet streaming once or twice a year to show they were still together and progress was being made on future releases. The band would allude to Let It Go as a tentative title for future releases at the time. From their Myspace account, they streamed early versions of many songs, including the track "Ingenious" in May 2005, "Breathe" in May 2006, "Blame Me" in June 2006, and "Texas" and "You Lie" in August 2007.

During these years, a number of different side-projects were also initiated by various members of the band. Murray, taking a break from creating music, turned to more producer-type roles. Most notably, he engineered and co-produced industrial rock band Ghost Machine's album Hypersensitive, where he worked with future Five Finger Death Punch vocalist Ivan Moody and The Clay People's guitarist John Stevens. After completing the album, Murray started up a new band with Stevens, and Walter Flakus of Stabbing Westward, called Chokt. Described as an outlet for music that didn't quite fit Lo-Pro, a formal album was never released, although nine songs were streamed online over the course of time before Lo-Pro would release another album. Meanwhile, Tommy Stewart worked as a short-term replacement drummer for a number of bands such as Fuel and Everclear, while John Fahnestock initially started a new band, "Noise Within" before eventually leaving permanently when his previous band, Snot, reformed with a new lead singer as Tons. He would be replaced by past Ultraspank member Jerry Olivera.

In 2007, the band began to focus on a more acoustic-driven songs. Upon Aaron Lewis wrapping up touring in support Staind's Chapter V album, Lo-Pro joined him for a short acoustic tour. The band debuted a number of songs that would later be released on future album, including tracks "Letting Go", "Hang On", "Today", and "All I Have". Murray mentioned the possibility a live DVD release of these concerts, though such a release has yet to surface. Additionally, the band started another Myspace page up under the name of "Lo-Pro Acoustic", and streamed several new acoustic studio tracks, including "Clean the Slate", the otherwise unreleased "This is Not Goodbye", and a cover of Filter's song "Consider This".

In an early 2008 interview, Murray detailed the band's progress and future plans:

"We really want to release something but we're the most prolific we've ever been so we've been recording like crazy. It's hard to stop. We've got a couple of rock records almost ready and we're almost done with our acoustic record, we promise...You're definitely going to hear a raw version of Lo-Pro which was always our intention. I love our first record but, holy crap, it was over-produced. We don't nit pick as much anymore, we move on. The acoustic album will be a first as well....We're lagging but we're really hoping the get this acoustic record out first in the spring with a rock record right behind it."

Despite plans to release music in early 2008, the band feared the material felt more like a demo than a finished product, so they began to rework, expand, and further polish the material more in further recording sessions with Angus Cooke. The band would post two more tracks, "This Way" and "Get Out of My Way" in August 2008, neither of which would make the cut for future releases. Murray would also release a demo of a piano-based cover version of the song "Drive" by The Cars, of which he was unsuccessful in convincing band members to record a full band version. The early version of "Texas" was even featured briefly in the Scrubs episode "My Bad Too" in 2008.

The band spent the first half of the year quietly working recording more music, before announcing in May 2009 that they would be part of the "Stimulate This" tour in mid-2009 with Staind, Shinedown, Halestorm, and Chevelle. The band would also briefly join Creed's reunion arena tour, around the same time-frame, playing on some of the dates where Creed would record their live DVD Creed Live, which broke the world record for most video cameras used at a live music event. With the album still not ready, but the band wanting something to release to capitalize on the high-profile touring, they instead opted to release a six track extended play titled Letting Go. The band would release a physical copy at their live shows in July, and a digital copy in October. The physical version contained six tracks, "Texas", "Hang On", "Alive", "Today", "Breathe", and "Letting Go", while the digital version lacked the track "Alive". Murray mentioned that "Alive" was kept off due to "single potential" for their future full-length album, although the track had already been made available for free download just prior to touring.

After the 2009 touring, the band returned to the studio and completed their second full album, which they would announce to be The Beautiful Sounds of Revenge. The band announced they had signed to smaller indie label "Rocket Science Ventures" and that the album would be released on May 25, 2010, though it was eventually delayed two weeks to June 8 to fit a few more songs on the album. The album's first and only single would be the track "Alive", which was released on May 4, 2010. The album contained all tracks from Letting Go except for "Today", plus an additional nine tracks, although many were reworked versions of tracks streamed in the time between the two albums.

The band toured in support of the album in the second half of 2010, most notably an acoustic show in the benefit concert being put on Aaron Lewis in support of his charity foundation "It Takes A Community" on August 14, 2010. Additionally, the final version of the song "Texas" is a playable track for the game Tap Tap Revenge 3.

=== Bittersweet (2011) ===
After the release of The Beautiful Sounds of Revenge, Murray confirmed that there were still intentions of releasing an acoustic album as he had alluded to in the years prior, but the band had wanted to return from their inactivity with an album with an electric sound closer to their original album first, then proceed with the acoustic material. Recent comments have confirmed working on recording acoustic material. In August 2010, they released a new acoustic version of "Clean the Slate", different from the version available on their Myspace in 2007. It was originally in contention for the acoustic album, but was ultimately left off.

Murray confirmed again that the album was still coming out, and was due out sometime in Spring 2011, and that there'd be a holiday preview of a song off the album with a "Yule Log" video, much like how they had done previously on New Year's Eve 2009. One new song, "Sweet Silence", was debuted in this fashion.

On July 31, Murray announced that the album would be titled Bittersweet, and would actually be released under the pseudonym "Life on Planet 9". Despite releasing it under this new name, Murray confirmed that it was still the Lo-Pro acoustic album, containing the same members, that had been working for years. It was first released in physical format at a live show on August 20, 2011, and was made available on iTunes on August 20, 2011. The album was digitally released on CDBaby on August 24, and on August 25 on iTunes.

The album contains a new version of the song "Wheels", a song Lo-Pro had demoed for their self-titled album in 2002.

On December 21, Murray posted the yearly Yule Log, revealing a new song entitled "Ammunition".

=== Disintegration Effect (2012–2013) ===
In early 2012, Murray confirmed that the band had started the process of putting together their third studio album, but said that, unlike prior releases, they wouldn't be leaking or streaming tracks beforehand because it sounded "different". Murray also confirmed that the band would continue to record their more acoustic/electronic material under the "Life on Planet 9" moniker, concurrently with the third Lo-Pro album, and released a new track for it titled "What Would You Say". Despite both moving concurrently, the band's primary focus would be releasing the third album under the "Lo-Pro" name. By the end of the year, the band has completed eight songs for the album and were aiming for an early 2013 release. In December 2012, Murray narrowed it down further, stating that the band was aiming for a February 2013 release date. A ninth track was completed in January 2013. By early February, Murray stated that the band had started the mixing process, and that the album release would likely fall into March 2013. He also announced that a Life on Planet 9 album would be released after the album.

On April 22, 2013, Murray announced that the title of the third album would be Disintegration Effect, which was released on May 14, 2013.

=== Side-projects and other releases (2014–present) ===
After the release of Disintegration Effect, Murray joined a new band, called White Noise Owl with original Lo-Pro bassist John Fahnestock. They released an EP, Until We Meet Again, on March 11, 2014, and have recorded a full-length album as well, which is scheduled for release in 2017. Two more albums under the "Life On Planet 9" moniker were recorded and released as well: The Theory of Everything in 2014, and Higher on January 31, 2017.

In April 2025, the band released a new song "Pathetic", their first song since 2013.

== Musical style and influences ==
MTV described the band's musical style as a form of melodic hard rock. Influences for the band include bands such as Pink Floyd and Alice in Chains. Murray specifically says several bands have influenced his vocals, including Led Zeppelin and U2, and the music of Peter Gabriel.

== Members ==
Current members

- Pete Murray – vocals, programming (2002–present)
- Neil Godfrey – guitar (2002–present)
- Pete Ricci – guitar (2002–present)
- Jerry Oliviera – bass (2009–present)
- Tommy Stewart – drums (2002–present)

Former members

- John Fahnestock – bass (2002–2008)

== Discography ==
Albums

- Lo-Pro (2003)
- The Beautiful Sounds of Revenge (2010)
- Disintegration Effect (2013)

Under pseudonym "Life on Planet 9"

- Bittersweet (2011)
- The Theory of Everything (2014)
- Higher (2017)
- Steady EP (2020)

EPs

- Letting Go (2009)

Singles

- "Sunday" (2003)
- "Alive" (2010)
