= Halloween (band) =

American heavy metal band

- Also known as: The Heavy Metal Horror Show
- Origin: Detroit, Michigan, U.S.
- Genres: Heavy metal; shock rock
- Years active: 1983–present
- Labels: Motor City Metal, Molten, Pure Steel Records
- Members: Brian Thomas; George Neal; Ben Harmsen; TJ Richardson; Rob Brug
- Past members: Don Guerrier; Chris "Boo" Buczek; Donny Allen; Billy Adams (BA); Jason Rossvannes; Jason Nikou; Tommy 'V' Vendetta; John Guarascio; Tim Franquist; Kevin Clifford; Tim Wright; Kenny Hill; Billy Gray; Rick Craig; Bill Whyte; Tommy Stewart
- Website: theheavymetalhorrorshow.com

Halloween is an American heavy metal band formed in Detroit, Michigan in 1983.

== History ==
The group was formed in 1983 by members Rick Craig, Brian Thomas, George Neal and Bill Whyte. Its debut album Don't Metal with Evil was released in 1985 on the Motor City Metal label. In 1986, Halloween started work on its follow up to Don't Metal With Evil, Victims of the Night. However, the record was shelved until it was finally released on Molton Metal Records in 1997.

In 1988, members Rick Craig and Bill Whyte left to pursue other careers. In 2000, Craig was asked to join the British band Humble Pie with Jerry Shirley to go on a U.S Tour. He also at the time was playing in the band NOON, in which he and Ean Evans were the primary songwriters. Their replacements were future Godsmack drummer Tommy Stewart and guitarist Billy Gray, who would go on to play in the Ann Arbor/Ypsilanti-based rock band Fair Game (not to be confused with the band led by former Keel vocalist Ron Keel). Bill Whyte went on to open his own recording studio and later (in 2003) joined Detroit based band Abandon and released a 5-song EP called "Project unrealty" which was Recorded, produced and engineered by Bill Whyte. The band and EP got great reviews but Bill's time with the band was short-lived.

In 1989, Halloween opened for Crimson Glory on a couple of dates on their Transcendence tour. In that same year, Halloween began work on a new album with Jon Drenning of Crimson Glory and Warren Wyatt management. The album never made it to the shelves.

In 1990, Halloween recorded a five-track demo titled Vicious Demos with producer Rob Tylak, Stewart and Gray. The demo was released on cassette for show and promotion only and sold at Halloween shows.

1991 saw a new lineup for Halloween, with the additions of former Erebus guitarist Tim Wright, guitarist Donny Allen (formerly of David Neil Cline's Trama and Black Onyx), and future Sponge drummer Billy Adams (a.k.a. BA!). That same year, Halloween released No One Gets Out.

The next few years saw a period of silence in terms of recordings. In 1997, former members Rick Craig and Bill Whyte rejoined, and Victims of the Night was finally released. After that, the band found themselves in debt, so they released a demo compilation called 1031, a Number of Things From.... The reunion was short-lived. Shortly after, Whyte and Craig left once again. In that period, bassist George Neal left only to return around 2004. A year before that, Tricks, Treats and Other Tales from the Crypt was released. It is a compilation album released by the band in 2003 and features re-recorded versions of classic Halloween songs, as well as one new studio track. It was recorded in 2002 and 2003.

Halloween's breakout album Tricks, Treats and Other Tales from the Crypt was recorded in 2002 with what has come to be known as the Halloween 4.0 lineup. The fourth iteration of the band featured founding vocalist Brian Thomas, Axe Slayer Donny Allen, Jason "JDawg" Rossvanes on drums, Tommy Vendetta Guitar and John "Sixpac" Guarascio on Bass. The lineup was actually not originally intended to be Halloween, but unbelievable fan support for Halloween almost forced their hand. The band worked tirelessly to record a mix of classic Halloween "hits" and a handful of new/unrecorded tracks. The band played several shows Stateside before being signed to headline the Keep It True Festival in Germany.

In 2006, the album Horror Fire and the extended play E.vil P.ieces were released. The band's new studio album, Terrortory, was released on February 25, 2012.

== Band members ==
Current members

- Brian Thomas– lead vocals
- Don Guerrier – guitar
- T.J. Richardson – guitar
- George Neal – bass
- Rob Brug – drums

Former members

- Rick Craig – guitar
- Bill Whyte – drums
- Tommy Stewart – drums
- Billy Gray – guitar
- Donny Allen – guitar
- Tim Wright – guitar
- Billy Adams – drums
- Jason Nikou – guitar
- John Guarascio – bass
- Tommy Vendetta – guitar
- Jason Rossvanes – drums

Timeline

== Discography ==
Studio albums

- Don't Metal with Evil (1985)
- No One Gets Out (1991)
- Victims of the Night (1997)
- Horror Fire (2006)
- Terrortory (2012)

Extended plays

- E.vil P.ieces (2006)

Compilations

- Motor City Rocks III (1984)
- Lamour Rocks (1986)
- Tricks, Treats and Other Tales from the Crypt (2003)

Demos

- Vicious Demos (1990)
- No One Gets Out (1990)
- 1031, a Number of Things From... (1998) (recorded from 1983 to 1998)

Live

- Not Dead... in the Murder City (2004) (recorded live February 2004)

Singles

- "Trick or Treat / She's a Teazer" (1984)
- "Where's Michael?" (2007)
