= Pete Murray (American musician) =

American singer

- Born: Peter Francis Murray; Larchmont, New York, U.S.
- Genres: Hard rock, acoustic rock, electronic rock, nu metal, industrial rock
- Occupations: Singer, songwriter
- Years active: 1995–present
- Website: lopromusic.com

Peter Francis Murray is an American rock singer. Starting his music career in the mid-1990s, he has been the lead vocalist for a number of bands, including nu metal band Ultraspank, hard rock band Lo-Pro, acoustic/electronic rock band Life On Planet 9, industrial rock band Chokt, and most recently, rock band White Noise Owl.

== Career ==
=== Early years and Ultraspank ===
Murray's first band was a speed metal band called Indica. While they did manage to earn the "MTV's Best College Rock Band of 1992" award, the band began to fall apart shortly after, leading some of the members, Murray included, to form a new band called "Spank". Unable to use the name due to copyright issues, the band changed their name to "Ultraspank" once they signed to a major record label. Murray recorded two nu metal albums with the band, Ultraspank in 1998 and Progress in 2000 before the band broke up after being dropped from their record deal.

=== Lo-Pro ===
Murray took a brief break from music after the end of Ultraspank, where he took up a job at a traveling magazine. However, before long, he reconnected with Ultraspank guitarist Neil Godfrey and began working on new music together. Murray came in contact with Aaron Lewis of the rock band Staind, who took interest in the material. Lewis also helped Murray assist in reworking the material into a more hard rock sound, fill out the rest of the band, and sign them to 413 Records, a sub-division of Geffen Records.

=== Life On Planet 9 ===
In the six-year gap between 2003 and 2009 Lo-Pro releases, the band would experiment with different sounds than their original hard rock sound. Murray, Godfrey, and Pete Ricci would write new acoustic material to perform on an acoustic tour with Lewis. However, in the studio, the tracks started to move in a more electronic rock and ambient direction. As such, Murray decided it was too different to be released under the "Lo-Pro" name, and the material would end up being released under a pseudonym called "Life On Planet 9". The first album, released in August 2011, was entitled Bittersweet. A second album, The Theory of Everything, was released in August 2014. Murray provides all vocals and electronic programming on these recordings.

=== Chokt ===
Another project taken on in between the six-year gap between Lo-Pro's first and second albums was working with Ivan Moody, who afterward formed Five Finger Death Punch, and Jon Stevens, past guitarist of The Clay People, in their band Ghost Machine. Murray produced their albums Ghost Machine and Hypersensitive. Afterwards, Murray and Stevens continued to work together, forming a new band, called "Chokt", with Walter Flakus of Stabbing Westward. They released nine songs between 2005 and 2009, but have not released a formal album or EP. Murray stated that the group "wouldn't be secret for long" in a 2008 interview, but has not revisited the project since he began releasing material in Lo-Pro again in 2009.

=== White Noise Owl ===
White Noise Owl was a band formed in 2013 by Murray, John Fahnestock, the original bassist for Lo-Pro, Will Hunt of Evanescence and Dark New Day, and Chris Shy of Aurora Sky, after the release of Lo-Pro's third album, Disintegration Effect. Murray provided vocals for their first release, an EP titled Until We Meet Again.

== Musical style and influences ==
Murray specifically says several bands have influenced his vocals, including Robert Plant of Led Zeppelin and Bono of U2, and Peter Gabriel. AllMusic described his Ultraspank era vocals as a "distorted howl".

== Discography ==
=== Ultraspank ===
- Ultraspank (1998)
- Progress (2000)

=== Lo-Pro ===
- Lo-Pro (2003)
- The Beautiful Sounds of Revenge (2009)
- Disintegration Effect (2013)

=== Life On Planet 9 ===
- Bittersweet (2011)
- The Theory of Everything (2014)
- Higher (2017)
- Steady EP (2020)

=== White Noise Owl ===
- Until We Meet Again (2014)
- Condition Critical (2019)

=== Side-projects ===
- 2005: Ghost Machine – Ghost Machine – producer
- 2006: Ghost Machine – Hypersensitive – producer
- 2009: MRI – Letters Never Sent – vocals
- 2012/2013: N Pa – Release Me: The Remixes EP / The Ghost Within: The Tale of Turmoil – vocals on "Release Me"
