= No One Gets Out =

Studio album by Halloween
- Released: 1991
- Genre: Heavy metal
- Length: 57:00
- Label: Motor City Metal Records

Halloween chronology
Don't Metal with Evil (1985)	No One Gets Out (1991)	Victims of the Night (1997)

No One Gets Out is the second studio album by Detroit metal band Halloween, released in 1991. Recorded at R.T. Audio in Novi, Michigan with studio owner/engineer Rob Tylak.

== History ==
No One Gets Out is Halloween's second release and is perhaps their most well known for the song "Kings" which was played at the 1990 Detroit Pistons playoff game. The album is a quantum leap from Don't Metal with Evil album. It's much more heavy and speedy than its predecessor, interrupted by the occasional half-ballad.

In 1989, new members Billy Gray and future Godsmack drummer Tommy Stewart joined Halloween. At the time, the band was under the same management as Florida Metal band Crimson Glory and Halloween began production on a new album for Warren Wyatt management. In 1990, Stewart and Gray departed and enter three new members, guitarist Donny Allen, guitarist Tim Wright and drummer Billy Adams (a.k.a. BA!). Recorded in 1990, two new demo tapes surfaced, one with an orange sleeve with an illustration and one that has a white covered sleeve with a photo of the band. The orange is rarer than the white. The orange contained a demo version of the track "The Thing That Creeps", while the white sleeve copy did not. The white sleeve copy also had a different track order. All demo tracks were later released on the studio album.

The album contains three cover songs. The first is "Crawl to the Altar" which guitarist Tim Wright brought to the band from his former group, Erebus. The second is a cover of a Seduce song aptly titled "Halloween". The last is a cover of a Kiss song Detroit Rock City.

Special guest Steve Langley (of the band EZ Access) played 12 string guitar on the album. Billy Gray played the 2nd guitar solo on “Kings”, at the end of the song.

== Tracks ==
All songs written by Halloween except where noted.

No.	Title	Writer(s)	Length
1.	"No One Gets Out"		4:07
2.	"If I Die You Die"		5:18
3.	"Crawl to the Altar" (Erebus cover)		4:35
4.	"7 Years"		3:38
5.	"The Death of Love"		5:19
6.	"Kings"		5:06
7.	"Sanity in Danger"		8:15
8.	"Miss Eerie's Child"		7:30
9.	"The Thing that Creeps"		3:33
10.	"Halloween" (Seduce cover)		4:00
11.	"Detroit Rock City" (Kiss cover)	Paul Stanley, Bob Ezrin	4:09
12.	"A.B.F.S."		0:44
Total length:			57:00

White sleeve demo tracks 1990
No.	Title	Length
1.	"Kings"
2.	"The Death of Love"
3.	"If I Die, You Die"
4.	"No One Gets Out"

Orange sleeve demo tracks 1990
No.	Title	Length
1.	"No One Gets Out"
2.	"The Death of Love"
3.	"The Things That Creeps"
4.	"If I Die, You Die"
5.	"Kings"

The album was reissued by Molten Metal U.S.A in 2001. It contained additional five bonus tracks from Vicious Demos (1990).

Bonus tracks on 2001 re-issue
No.	Title	Length
13.	"I Confess"	3:54
14.	"Vicious Lies"	4:35
15.	"Evil Nation"	2:35
16.	"Agony"	3:06
17.	"Black Skies"	5:56

== Personnel ==
- Brian Thomas – vocals
- George Neal – bass
- Donny Allen – guitar
- Tim Wright – guitar, acoustic guitar
- Billy Adams (a.k.a. BA!) – drums

Additional musicians

- Billy Gray – 2nd guitar solo on "Kings"
- Steve Langley – acoustic guitar
- Melanie Adams – voices on "Sanity in Danger"
