= Ultraspank (album) =

1998 studio album by Ultraspank

Studio album by Ultraspank
- Released: March 31, 1998
- Recorded: Mid-1997
- Studio: NRG Recording Studios (North Hollywood, California): Orange Whip Studios (Santa Barbara, California)
- Genre: Nu metal, industrial metal
- Length: 44:36
- Label: Epic
- Producer: David Bottrill

Ultraspank chronology
Ultraspank (1998)	Progress (2000)

Professional ratings
Review scores
Source	Rating
AllMusic	3/5 stars

Ultraspank is the debut studio album by the American nu metal band Ultraspank. It was released on March 31, 1998 on Epic Records.

Their song "5" was featured on the PlayStation video game 3Xtreme. And "Better Luck Next Time" song also featured in the main menu of the same game.

== Track listing ==
No.	Title	Length
1.	"No Man, My Hands are Dirty"	0:17
2.	"5"	4:56
3.	"Butter"	3:38
4.	"Slip"	4:26
5.	"Suck"	3:19
6.	"Wrapped"	4:07
7.	"Perfect"	4:41
8.	"Sponge"	4:53
9.	"Fired"	3:14
10.	"Worn"	4:57
11.	"Burnt"	3:57
12.	"Better Luck Next Time"	2:44
Total length:		44:36

Japanese bonus tracks
No.	Title	Length
13.	"Asphyxiate"	4:33
14.	"Suck (Live)" ("Asphyxiate" and "Suck (Live)" are featured on the "Turn Your Head & Cough" EP, and "Suck (Live)" was recorded on March 31, 1998 at the Cabaret Metro.)	3:43

== Personnel ==
- Pete Murray - vocals, programming
- Neil Godfrey - guitar
- Jerry Oliviera - guitar
- Dan Ogden - bass, backing vocals
- Tyler Clark - drums, backing vocals
- Stephen Marcussen - mastering
- David Bottrill - production, mixing
