= Alive (Lo-Pro song) =

Single by Lo-Pro

from the album The Beautiful Sounds of Revenge
- Released: May 4, 2010
- Recorded: 2009
- Genre: Hard rock, alternative metal
- Length: 3:42
- Label: Rocket Science (Indie)
- Songwriter(s): Pete Murray
- Producer(s): Pete Murray, Angus Cooke

"Alive" is the lead single from Lo-Pro's second studio album The Beautiful Sounds of Revenge, which was released on June 8, 2010. The official single itself was released ahead of time on May 4, 2010. It is the band's first single in almost seven years, since their release of their song "Sunday" in August 2003.

== History ==
Alive was first made available as a free download on July 4, 2009, on the Staind official band website. It was also put on the physical release of the Letting Go EP, which was only sold on the "Stimulate This" tour, which started on July 14, 2009. The EP was eventually released digitally on October 23, 2009, but "Alive" was left off of it. Lead singer Pete Murray confirmed that it was kept off in favor of putting it on The Beautiful Sounds of Revenge. While other songs ended up being on both releases, "Alive" being taken off due to its single potential.

The song was originally going to be released as a single on March 30, 2010. However, when the album was delayed, so was the single. The single was released on May 4, 2010, and the song is scheduled to hit radio stations on May 24, 2010.

While Lo-Pro has a history of releasing alternative versions of their songs, such as "Texas" and "Clean the Slate", this song has no known different versions. The versions on the hard copy version of the Letting Go EP and The Beautiful Sounds of Revenge are identical.
