= Bled (film) =

2009 American horror film

- Directed by: Christopher Hutson
- Written by: Sxv'leithan Essex
- Produced by: Bridget Allard; Jeffrey Allard; Christopher Hutson; Kent Jones; Chris Kazmier; Julie Newsome; Scott Rettberg; Joe Vetrano; Gregg von Thaden
- Starring: Sarah Farooqui; Chris Ivan Cevic; Alex Petrovitch; Michele Morrow; Ivan Moody
- Cinematography: Bruce Ready
- Edited by: Edward Christoph
- Music by: Chris Kazmier
- Distributed by: Grindstone Entertainment Group
- Release date: April 7, 2009
- Running time: 95 minutes
- Country: United States
- Language: English

Bled is a 2009 horror film directed by Christopher Hutson and starring Sarah Farooqui, Chris Ivan Cevic, Alex Petrovitch, Michele Morrow, and Ivan Moody. It was written by Sxv'leithan Essex. The film released direct to DVD on April 7, 2009.

== Premise ==
Sai, a young artist living in a downtown warehouse delves into an ancient world of blood and lust. An enigmatic foreigner seduces her to try a long forgotten drug making her the prey of a dimensional vampire who needs her newfound hunger for blood to cross over from his world to hers.

== Cast ==
- Sarah Farooqui as Sai
- Chris Ivan Cevic as Royce
- Alex Petrovitch as Eric
- Michele Morrow as Kerra
- Ivan Moody as Incubus
- Jonathan Oldham as Renfield
- Dichen Lachman as Aaren
- Jennifer Lee Wiggins as Lynn
- Kimberly Rowe as Deannay
- Monica Huntington as Candace
- Sarah Coleman as Gallery Patron
- Daniel Colletti as Robert
- Warren Draper as Grierson
- Aric Green as Jono
- Ben Northenor as Coot Peddeck
