= 1031, a Number of Things From... =

Demo album by Halloween
- Released: 1998
- Recorded: 1983–1998
- Genre: Heavy metal
- Length: 56:54
- Label: Central City Records

1031, a Number of Things From... is a 1998 demo-compilation released by Detroit heavy metal band Halloween to help raise money to keep the band going after a reunion with original members Rick Craig and Bill Whyte. The compilation includes five tracks from the 1990 release Vicious Demos and a number of unreleased tracks recorded through the years with different lineups.

== Track listing ==
1. I Confess
2. Vicious Lies
3. Evil Nation
4. Agony
5. Black Skies
6. 11
7. Sudden Death
8. Intoxicated
9. In Darkness
10. Crying for You
11. 1-900
12. 1989
13. The Battle
14. I Scream

== Sources ==
- Official website
- Halloween at Encyclopaedia Metallum
