= Progress (Ultraspank album) =

2000 studio album by Ultraspank

Studio album by Ultraspank
- Released: May 30, 2000
- Recorded: 1999
- Genre: Nu metal Industrial metal
- Length: 49:12
- Label: Epic
- Producer: Peter Collins

Ultraspank chronology
Ultraspank (1998)	Progress (2000)

Professional ratings
Review scores
Source	Rating
AllMusic	3/5 stars
Metal Hammer	9/10

Progress is the second and final album by American industrial metal band Ultraspank. This is the only album to feature former Snot drummer James "Fed" Carroll. The 2nd and 6th tracks “Crumble” and “Click” are featured in the soundtrack to the 2001 PS2 racing video game ATV Offroad Fury.

== Background ==
=== Album artwork ===
The album artwork used on this release is a picture of the Vacanti mouse, which had a growth of cartilage molded on its back to resemble a human ear.

=== Sales ===
Despite anemic sales, Progress nevertheless received very positive reviews from critics both at the time of its release, and today.

== Track listing ==
1. "Push" - 3:52
2. "Crumble" - 3:46
3. "Stuck" - 3:34
4. "Feed" - 4:12
5. "Smile" - 3:59
6. "Click" - 4:24
7. "Jackass" - 3:40
8. "Crack" - 3:31
9. "Invite Yourself In" - 0:16
10. "Thanks" - 3:03
11. "Left" - 4:15
12. "Where" - 10:40
- "Maybe Tomorrow" - hidden track that begins at 7:30 after "Where".

== Personnel ==
- Pete Murray - vocals, programming
- Dan Ogden - bass guitar
- James "Fed" Carroll - drums
- Jerry Oliviera - guitar
- Neil Godfrey - guitar
- Peter Collins - production, mixing, mastering
