= Ghost Machine (album) =

Studio album by Ghost Machine
- Released: July 26, 2005
- Recorded: April 2005
- Genre: Alternative metal; experimental rock; progressive rock; industrial metal
- Length: 65:16
- Label: Black Blood
- Producer: Ghost Machine, Pete Murray

Ghost Machine chronology
Ghost Machine (2005)	Hypersensitive (2006)

Professional ratings
Review scores
Source	Rating
FoundryMusic.com	link

Ghost Machine is the self-titled debut album by American metal band Ghost Machine. It was released on July 26, 2005, via the band's own label Black Blood Records.

The album contains a total of 13 core tracks. There are parts on the album that are silent spaces 4 seconds in length. There are 7 tracks, all of which are 11 seconds in length and feature the same random noises. Track 12 is a 4:01 remix of "God Forbid", track 13 is a track called "Certain Things" and is 4:38 in length. Track 14, "Ripped", goes for 6:13 and is a dark ambient track that samples random noises.

== Track listing ==
1. "Intro" – 1:06
2. "Headstone" – 4:08
3. "Vegas Moon" – 3:55
4. "God Forbid" – 3:27
5. "Scarred By Happiness (L.S.D.)" – 5:22
6. "Siesta Loca" – 4:08
7. "What You Made Me (Ugli)" – 3:23
8. "L.S.H.F." – 6:07
9. "Rock in Roll" – 3:49
10. "Burning Bridges" – 3:48
11. "Last Stairwell" – 4:04
12. "God Forbid" (Quiet Room Mix) – 4:01
13. "Certain Things" – 4:38
14. "Ripped" – 6:13
