= Ghost Machine (band) =

American rock band

- Origin: Los Angeles, California, U.S.
- Genres: Alternative metal; industrial metal; experimental rock; progressive rock
- Years active: 2005–2007
- Label: Corporate Punishment
- Members: John Stevens; Stitch; Chris "Crispy" Binns; Brett "Wingnut" Davis
- Past members: Ivan Moody; Mike "Mikey" McLaughlin

Ghost Machine was an American metal band from Los Angeles, California, active in the mid-2000s. It featured two members from Motograter, vocalist Ivan Moody (also vocalist for Five Finger Death Punch) and drummer Chris "Crispy" Binns, as well as John Stevens of The Clay People.

== History ==
Ghost Machine came together when vocalist Ivan Moody and guitarist John Stevens met at XM Radio. Moody's band Motograter, previously signed to Elektra Records, were to perform live on-air, when John, an XM Radio producer impressed with Moody's vocals, thought he would be a good fit with the material he had written for his previous project. After several recording sessions, drummer Chris Binns of Motograter (formerly of Intrinsic) was recruited, along with electronics/keyboards/programmer Brett Davis and bassist Mike McLaughlin (formerly of Intrinsic).

The band released their self-titled debut album Ghost Machine on July 26, 2005, via their own label Black Blood Records. The album was engineered and co-produced by Pete Murray (Lo-Pro). On December 21, 2005, the band signed with independent label Corporate Punishment Records.

The band's second album, Hypersensitive, was released on November 21, 2006. It features ten new tracks which were not on the band's previous release. The song "Siesta Loca" from the album is featured on the Saw III soundtrack.

Ivan Moody is no longer listed on the band's page as a member. When asked if he was going to work with Ghost Machine again, Moody said: "I don't. Ghost Machine was something I did for fun. Lots of good friends involved. But it was never intended to be huge or even a band. We literally made 20,000 copies of that. It was just something as a spiritual release more than to get anyone's attention."

== Musical style ==
AllMusic defined Ghost Machine as an "experimental heavy rock" act whose music mixed "industrial metal and progressive heavy rock".

== Members ==
- John Stevens – guitars, programming
- Stitch – bass
- Chris Binns – drums
- Brett Davis – electronics, keyboards, programming

Former

- Mike McLaughlin – bass
- Ivan Moody – vocals

== Discography ==
| Release date | Title | Label |
|---|---|---|
| July 26, 2005 | Ghost Machine | Black Blood |
| November 21, 2006 | Hypersensitive | Corporate Punishment |
