= Sunday (Lo-Pro song) =

Single by Lo-Pro

from the album Lo-Pro
- Released: August 21, 2003
- Recorded: 2002
- Genre: Hard rock, alternative metal
- Length: 3:46
- Label: Geffen/413 Records
- Songwriter: Pete Murray
- Producers: Aaron Lewis and Don Gilmore

"Sunday" is the lead single from Lo-Pro's first studio album Lo-Pro, which was released on September 30, 2003. They released a video for it the following year. It would be the band's first and only single from the album, and the only single the band would produce until almost seven years later, when they released "Alive" in May 2010.

== History ==
"Sunday" was available as free download at the band website on August 21, 2003, and it made its radio debut at the end of August.

The song did relatively well for a debut single for a new band. It reached the top 30 in both the Billboard Mainstream Rock Tracks and the Billboard Modern Rock Tracks. Despite this, the band was soon dropped from their record label, and a second single never surfaced.

Pete Murray said of the single:

"It's definitely not about watching football or going to church. It's really about how I've never had anything to look forward to on Sunday. I never liked going to school or going to a job, and when Sunday comes, you just know things are gonna hit the ringer the following day."

== Charts ==
| Chart (2004) | Peak position |
|---|---|
| US Mainstream Rock Tracks (Billboard) | 20 |
| US Modern Rock Tracks (Billboard) | 27 |
