= Don't Metal with Evil =

Studio album by Halloween
- Released: 1985
- Recorded: 1983–1985
- Studio: The Disc Ltd., Detroit, Michigan, US
- Genre: Heavy metal
- Length: 35:42
- Label: MCM Records
- Producer: Halloween

Halloween chronology
Don't Metal with Evil (1985)	No One Gets Out (1991)

Don't Metal With Evil is the debut studio album by American heavy metal band Halloween. Released in 1985, it was recorded from 1983 to 1985 in Detroit, Michigan. The album was re-released on Killer Metal Records on vinyl LP and CD with different bonus tracks.

== Track listing ==
All tracks written by Halloween except where stated.

Side one
No.	Title	Length
1.	"Busted"	3:11
2.	"Scared to Death"	2:37
3.	"Justice for All"	3:08
4.	"Trick or Treat"	3:11
5.	"The Wicked Witch"	2:52
6.	"Don't Metal with Evil"	3:02

Side two
No.	Title	Length
7.	"What a Nice Place"	2:59
8.	"Haunted"	3:51
9.	"She's a Teazer"	3:52
10.	"Tales from the Crypt"	3:19
11.	"To Fight the Beast"	3:30
Total length:		35:42

=== Bonus tracks on 2008 German re-release ===
Cd version
No.	Title	Length
12.	"I Confess"
13.	"Vicious Lies"
14.	"Evil Nation"

The bonus tracks on the cd version were originally released on Vicious Demo (1990).

Vinyl Re-release
No.	Title	Length
12.	"The Right to Rock" (Live)
13.	"Bitten by Fear" (Live)
14.	"Don't Metal With Evil" (Live)
15.	"Trick or Treat" (Live)

All live tracks were recorded at Harpo's Concert Theatre on August 2, 1985.

== Personnel ==
Band Members

- Brian Thomas – lead vocals
- Rick Craig – lead guitar, vocals
- George Neal – bass, vocals
- Bill Whyte – drums

Production

- Halloween – producer
- Greg Reilly – engineer
- Mike Harrell – engineer
