= Ivan Moody =

American heavy metal vocalist

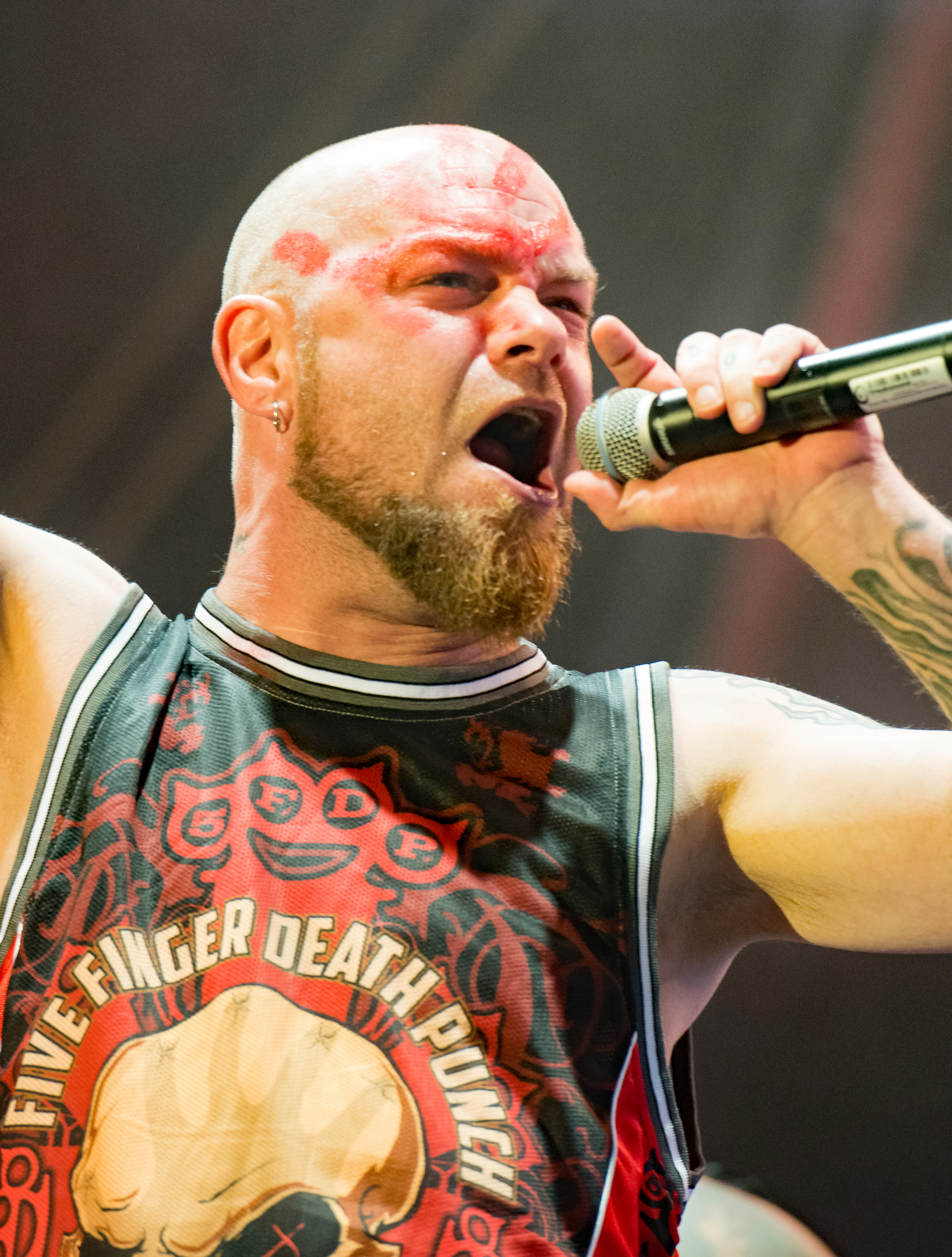
- Moody performing with Five Finger Death Punch in 2016

Background information
- Also known as: "Ghost"
- Born: Ivan Lewis Greening; January 7, 1980 (age 46); Denver, Colorado, U.S.
- Genres: Groove metal; alternative metal; hard rock; nu metal
- Occupations: Singer; songwriter
- Years active: 2002–present
- Member of: Five Finger Death Punch
- Formerly of: Motograter; Ghost Machine

Ivan L. Moody (born Ivan Lewis Greening on January 7, 1980) is an American singer and songwriter who is the lead vocalist of heavy metal band Five Finger Death Punch (FFDP). He performed for several other bands including Motograter and Ghost Machine before joining Five Finger Death Punch. Moody was known by the pseudonym "Ghost" during his time with Motograter.

== Early life ==
Moody was born Ivan Lewis Greening in Denver, Colorado. Growing up, he lived in several smaller cities in the area, including Arvada, Castle Rock, Lakewood, Wheat Ridge, and Northglenn. He said he spent a few summers with his grandmother in Wisconsin - "My grandmother put me in choir when I was about seven years old. I was only in it about two or three years. Music's always been real close to my heart. Like anybody else, there were ups and downs in my life and music just always seemed to be consistent, so it was easy to latch on to. I started singing in bands when I was 16 years old. They used to kick me out of bars after my set was done."

== Career ==
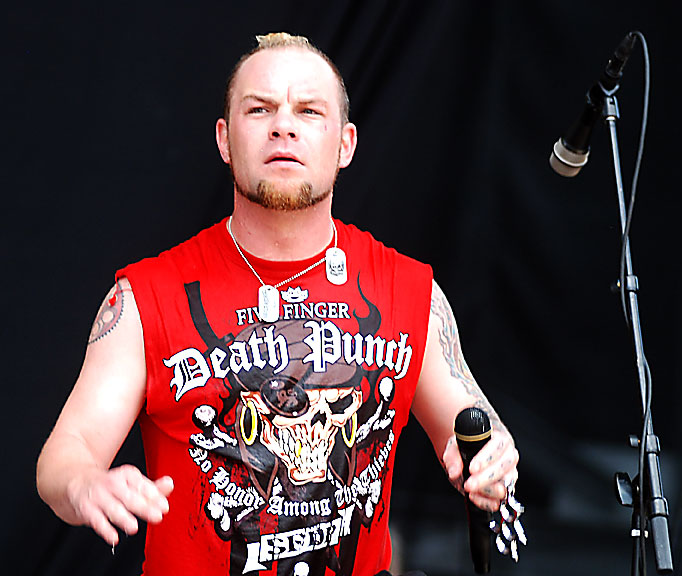
Moody during Rock on the Range 2010 in Columbus, Ohio

Moody moved to Los Angeles in 2001, adopting the surname of Billy Moody, who had married his mother and was "like a father to me". There, he joined his first band called Toiz. The band played a few shows around the Los Angeles area in 2002 and made a demo which was not released. The following year, Moody joined the nu metal band Motograter. They released their self-titled studio album in May 2003, and gained some mainstream success playing the second stage at Ozzfest 2003 and touring with bands like Korn, Disturbed, Marilyn Manson, Nothingface, Slipknot, Mushroomhead, and Killswitch Engage. Motograter went on a hiatus in 2005 but played a one-time reunion show in 2006 at the Delicious Rox Festival. Moody also made songs with old roommates and family members, Ryan Morrow (bass), Bill Stonebraker (guitar), and Jim "Dugan" Demongey (drums), calling themselves Black Blood Orchestra.

Moody joined the heavy metal band Five Finger Death Punch and his side project Ghost Machine released their self-titled debut album in July 2005. Ghost Machine released their second album, Hypersensitive, in November 2006. In the same year, Five Finger Death Punch entered the studio to record their debut album at Next Level Studios and Complex Studios in Los Angeles with Steve Bruno and Mike Sarkisyan. The album was produced by guitarist Zoltan Bathory and drummer Jeremy Spencer and was mixed by former Machine Head and Soulfly guitarist Logan Mader.

Five Finger Death Punch achieved rapid commercial success: their debut album, The Way of the Fist (2007), has sold over 600,000 copies in the United States and spawned three top 10 singles. Their second album, War Is the Answer (2009), sold more than 44,000 copies in its first week of release, spawned five top 10 singles, and has gone on to sell more than 700,000 copies. Their even more successful third record, American Capitalist, debuted number 3 on the Billboard 200 chart and sold over 90,000 copies in its first week. It was the band's third consecutive RIAA-certified Gold record. in July 2013, The Wrong Side of Heaven and the Righteous Side of Hell, Volume 1 was released, selling over 210,000 copies. Roughly four months later, The Wrong Side of Heaven and the Righteous Side of Hell, Volume 2 was released, rising to number 2 on the Billboard 200, and notable for its single, "Battle Born".

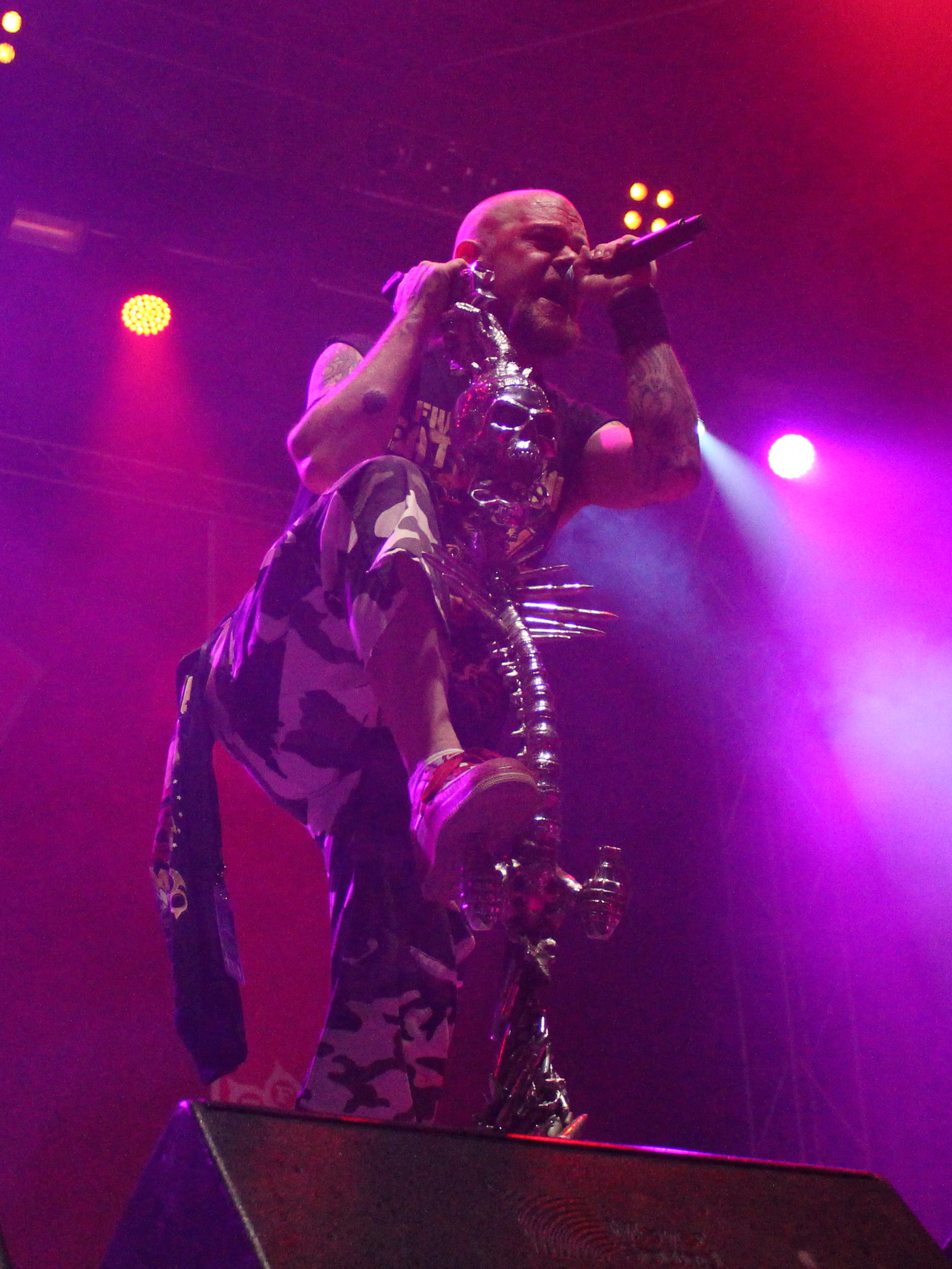
Moody performing in 2016

Five Finger Death Punch played many major tours and festivals, including Korn's Family Values and Bitch We Have a Problem tours, the Jägermeister Stage at Mayhem Festival in 2008 and the main stage at Mayhem Festival in 2010 and 2013. They also performed at Download Festival in 2009, 2010, 2013, and 2015, and the Monster Stage at Rock on the Range in Columbus, Ohio in 2008, 2010, 2012, and 2014, as well as at Rockfest 2012 in Kansas City.

Moody was interviewed for the book Full Metal: The 50 Most Influential Heavy Metal Songs of the 1980s and the True Stories Behind Their Lyrics. He discusses the impact of Metallica's "Fade to Black" on him as a lyricist in a chapter about the song that also examines its social and cultural significance.

In 2009, Moody starred in the horror film Bled, playing the role of Incubus. He also co-starred alongside Shawn Crahan in Darren Lynn Bousman's short horror musical film The Devil's Carnival, which screened in April 2012.

On June 12, 2017, Moody stated during a concert in Tilburg, Netherlands, that it will be his last show with Five Finger Death Punch. The band released a statement saying they would keep moving forward. Moody checked himself into rehab and was replaced for the remaining dates by vocalist Tommy Vext. As of December 2019, Moody had returned to touring with Five Finger Death Punch, stating he had been sober for the past 22 months (since early 2018).

== Personal life ==
Moody has two daughters and two sons He became a grandfather when his oldest daughter gave birth in 2020. He owns a CBD dispensary called Moody's Medicinals, and currently resides in Cheyenne, Wyoming. He was previously married to Holly Smith. Smith filed for divorce from Moody in August 2015.

In 2012, Moody revealed that his alcoholism nearly got him fired from Five Finger Death Punch. Moody said he would perform drunk and not remember any of it the next day. Moody says that he "felt like a junkie and from that extreme, it takes a lot of effort to go back." Moody referred to Judas Priest frontman Rob Halford as his "sober coach", and stated that he received support from him during turbulent times with other members of Five Finger Death Punch. He also stated that Jonathan Davis of Korn also provided him with support during this time.

Moody stated that he had a near-death experience and "died" for three and a half minutes from alcohol withdrawal syndrome after he went four days without drinking following a two-year bender. He recounted the experience to Metal Hammer in 2022: "For four days I locked myself inside the house, and the fourth day my daughter came over and I went to hand her a glass of water, and that’s all I remember." He claimed to have had an out-of-body experience, and that he found himself "in a blue haze." He further described his experience:

"I became part of something while I was there. I say 'there' because I was not in this shell. And for the first time in my existence, I felt peace. It was very quiet and peaceful, and I remember not worrying about anything. I didn’t have an unidirectional view. It was wide, and I could see and feel everything. There was no matter involved, I was pure energy, and I saw this incredibly blue light. It was the afterlife and I was on the edge. [...] The next thing I know, I was laying there with two paddles on my chest, and my daughter was crying in my face. My daughter was the one saying, 'Please, not now.' Her voice pulled me back and that was the wake-up call for me."

Moody references his alcoholism and its battles in the video "I Apologize", where Moody is walking through a graveyard filled with musicians that have died struggling with addiction. In November 2016, Moody cut a concert short in Worcester, claiming that his mother was dying that night. Concertgoers reported that he appeared drunk, and was assisted off the stage. His younger sister told a reporter that their mother was "alive and well". In June 2017, Moody left a Five Finger Death Punch tour for rehab. He claims that CBD products helped him overcome his alcoholism. He broke his foot in 2018, but performed shows regardless with the aid of an assistive cane. Moody has maintained sobriety from alcohol since March 2018.

=== Legal issues ===
In February 2014, Ivan Moody was arrested in Australia and charged following an incident involving a flight attendant on a Qantas flight from Brisbane.

On April 21, 2015, Moody was arrested in Las Vegas and charged with domestic battery following an incident involving his then-wife, Holly Smith. The battery charges were later dropped in July, though Smith subsequently filed a restraining order.

In August 2015, reports also surfaced that Moody’s sister, Sandra Dykes, and his mother had filed restraining orders against him amid a family dispute involving financial accusations.

== Philanthropy ==
Members of Five Finger Death Punch, including Moody, have a long history of supporting a variety of philanthropic initiatives throughout their career, particularly benefitting veterans, first responders, and recovery programs. During the COVID-19 pandemic in 2020, Moody used his health and wellness company Moody’s Medicinals to donate thousands of CBD hand sanitizers to veteran-led and veteran-serving charities across the United States, including organizations such as Workshops for Warriors. This initiative was intended to provide hygiene supplies to veterans during the pandemic.

Moody has also supported recovery-focused initiatives. As someone in long-term recovery, he has contributed time and resources to organizations assisting individuals struggling with addiction and established the Ciara Coral Intensive Outpatient Program in Cheyenne, Wyoming, which provides treatment and recovery support. In recognition of his community contributions, including his advocacy for recovery initiatives, Moody was awarded the Key to the City of Cheyenne by local officials in 2023.

In 2024, the band donated $200,000 from a portion of ticket sales from their North American arena tour to charities selected by band members. Moody chose Covenant House, which provides support and shelter for homeless and at-risk youth.

== Awards and nominations ==
Motograter was voted the best band of 2003 by Hit Parader. Five Finger Death Punch has won several awards including The Best New Band award at the 2009 Metal Hammer Golden Gods Awards, the Most Promising Artist award from FMQB's 2009 year-end Metal poll. They were also nominated for the Best International Newcomer award at 2009 Kerrang! Awards and won the Best Breakthrough Band award at the 2010 Metal Hammer Golden Gods Awards. Best Song for "Lift Me Up" at the 2014 Metal Hammer Golden Gods Awards.

== Discography ==
=== Motograter ===
- 2003: Motograter

There are also four Motograter demos with Moody on lead vocals, including "Down (2002 Demo)", "No Name (2002 Demo)", "Red (2002 Demo)", and "Failure (Live 2004)".

=== Ghost Machine ===
- 2005: Ghost Machine
- 2006: Hypersensitive

After Hypersensitive, Ghost Machine started working on a remix album that they had to put on the back burner because of the success of Five Finger Death Punch. Four remixes were released for stream on the band's MySpace music remix page: "God Forbid (Black Cape Remix)", "Vegas Moon (Pete Murray Remix)", "Siesta Loca (Steven's Organic Drum Remix)" and "Burning Bridges (Depression Remix)".

=== Five Finger Death Punch ===
Studio albums

- The Way of the Fist (2007)
- War Is the Answer (2009)
- American Capitalist (2011)
- The Wrong Side of Heaven and the Righteous Side of Hell, Volume 1 (2013)
- The Wrong Side of Heaven and the Righteous Side of Hell, Volume 2 (2013)
- Got Your Six (2015)
- And Justice for None (2018)
- F8 (2020)
- AfterLife (2022)
- Legacy (2026)

=== Guest appearances ===
List of guest appearances in other types of albums with other performing artists, showing year released and album name.
Year	Title	Other performer(s)	Album
2012	"A Penny for a Tale"	N/A	The Devil's Carnival
2019	"Outlaws & Outsiders"	Cory Marks	Who I Am
2020	"Maybe It's Time"	Sixx:A.M. featuring Joe Elliott, Brantley Gilbert, Ivan Moody, Slash, Corey Taylor, Awolnation and Tommy Vext)	Sno Babies/Prayers for the Blessed, Vol. 2
2025	"Holy Water"	The Funeral Portrait	Greetings from Suffocate City

== Bibliography ==
- Ivan Moody's Dirty Poetry (2021)

== Filmography ==
- Bled (2009) (as Incubus)
- The Devil's Carnival (2012) (as the hobo clown)
- The Retaliators (2021) as Victor "Vic" Kady
