= Hypersensitive =

Studio album by Ghost Machine
- Released: November 21, 2006
- Recorded: Orange Whip Studios (Santa Barbara, CA); Pete's Metal Box (Santa Barbara, CA)
- Genre: Alternative metal; experimental rock; progressive rock; industrial metal
- Length: 67:23
- Label: Corporate Punishment
- Producer: Pete Murray

Ghost Machine chronology
| Ghost Machine (2005) | Hypersensitive (2006) |

Hypersensitive is the second and final album by American rock band Ghost Machine. It was released on November 21, 2006, via Corporate Punishment Records.

The original track listing of the album, displayed on sites like Amazon and AllMusic, was identical to that of their self-titled debut album Ghost Machine (2005). However, it actually features ten new tracks and the older tracks have been slightly reworked.

== Track listing ==
1. "The End" – 2:12
2. "Sheltered" – 4:00
3. "Headstone" – 3:50
4. "D.U.A." – 2:08
5. "God Forbid" – 3:43
6. "What You Made Me (Ugli)" – 3:21
7. "Skank" – 3:35
8. "Bondage" – 3:30
9. "Vegas Moon" – 3:50
10. "Desert Rose" – 4:32
11. "Interlude" – 1:20
12. "Crawl" – 4:14
13. "Siesta Loca" – 4:00
14. "Edification" – 4:03
15. "Lull-A-Bye" – 2:34
16. "Untitled" – 0:06
17. "Untitled" – 0:06
18. "Untitled" – 0:06
19. "Untitled" – 0:06
20. "Scrape" – 3:53
21. "Burning Bridges" – 3:50
22. "Dose" – 8:18 (instrumental)
