= The Beautiful Sounds of Revenge =

Studio album by Lo-Pro
- Released: June 8, 2010
- Recorded: 2005–2009
- Studio: Orange Whip Studios (Santa Barbara, California)
- Genre: Hard rock, post-grunge
- Label: Rocket Science (Indie)
- Producer: Pete Murray, Angus Cooke

Lo-Pro chronology
Letting Go (2009)	The Beautiful Sounds of Revenge (2010)	Disintegration Effect (2013)

Singles from The Beautiful Sounds of Revenge
- 1. "Alive" Released: May 4, 2010

The Beautiful Sounds of Revenge is the second full-album by Lo-Pro, originally scheduled to be released was May 25, 2010, but was delayed to June 8, 2010, in order to add more songs to it. It is their third formal release of music, after their self-titled release in 2003 and the Letting Go EP in 2009. The album is described by leader singer and songwriter Pete Murray as "a diary of the Lo-Pro experience" over the course of the seven years it took to make the album. The album's only single was "Alive".

== Background ==
The band released their first, self-titled album in 2003, and then toured in support of it during the first half of 2004, until Geffen dropped them from their label. In June 2004, the band released the following statement:

As some of you seem to have heard, Lo-Pro has indeed parted ways with Geffen records. Were still a part of the 413/records family however, and were alive and kicking. Weve been using our down time to write record #2 which were really excited about and think youll be very happy with as well. I dont want to give too much away, but its shaping up to be a very "live" record.

The band then continued to work on music from 2005 through 2009, occasionally streaming a song or two they were working on from their Myspace account. Many plans, such as a live DVD or an acoustic cd were considered, but ultimately dropped for the time being.

The band did have music they intended to release around 2008, but they ended up feeling like what they had at the time was more like a demo than a finished product, and decided to expand the material more in the sessions done later with Angus Cooke, which would be worked into the final released material.

Eventually, the music was used for 2 releases. The first release was the Letting Go EP which contained 6 songs and was sold in hard copy form at concerts starting July 2009, and released digitally in October 2009 to "tide fans over". The second release was a full-length album, The Beautiful Sounds of Revenge, which contained 5 of the EP songs (the track "Today" didn't make it) and 10 new tracks, some had been made available in various forms by streaming over the internet or in live performances over the years, others being previously unheard.

Lead singer Pete Murray, in December 2009, reported via his Twitter account that he was listening to the album masters, hinting that the album was done or very close to it. In mid-February their official website read "Almost There. Almost" and then in early March its release date of May 25, 2010 was announced. However, Lo-Pro's official site changed from showing the date "5.25.10" to "6.08.2010", hinting that the release date has changed. Shortly after this, it was confirmed to be delayed to June 8, 2010.

An interview with Pete Murray confirmed that the delay was to add more music to the album, and that it would contain 15 tracks, 14 standard songs and 1 bonus track. The two additional songs were eventually revealed to be "Pushed Aside" and "Novocaine".

The first song that had been confirmed for the album was titled "Alive". This song was on the physical version of the bands Letting Go EP that was sold exclusively on their summer 2009 tours, but was later left off the digital distribution version later sold on iTunes in October 2009. When asked about this, lead singer Pete Murray confirmed that it was pulled off in favor of putting it on The Beautiful Sounds of Revenge. Eventually, five of the six tracks from the Letting Go EP actually ended up on the album. (Only "Today" is not on the album.)

On December 31, 2009, the band posted a video that contained 2 songs also to be on the upcoming LP. One was a new version of "Ingenious", a song that had been debuted and streaming in demo form as far back as 2005 when they first started recording music after their first album. The other song was a new, previously unheard track thought to be named "Waiting", although it was later turned out to be "A Life That's Just Begun". The video was taken down a few days later.

On March 8, 2010, it was announced that "Alive" would be the first single off the album. It was originally supposed to be hitting radio stations March 30, 2010. However, with the delay of the album to June 8, the single release was also delayed, to May 4, the same time the official track list for the album was set to be revealed.

By the end of March, the first review of an advance copy of the cd surfaced, confirming a number of other songs for the album, albeit mostly in no particular order. While quite early for an advance copy to be reviewed, it was mentioned by Pete Murray, confirming it legitimate. Later reviews would confirm the majority of the track list.

On May 4, the first single from the album "Alive", along with "Pushed Aside", "All I Have" and "Clean The Slate" were added to the band's Myspace player. The album was released as planned on June 8, 2010.

== Reception ==
Reception for the album has been generally positive. The New Review, gave the album at 3.5 out of 5 rating, stating "...fans who scratch their “heavy” itch with bands like Staind, Seether or Finger Eleven will embrace this release with open arms as they should." Schwegweb's review stated the album "...starts with great rock riffs that set the tone for the rest of the album. This album combines heavy influences from bands they previously were in. I could definitely feel a lot of Ultraspank peeking its head into a few of these songs... Pete’s vocals are fantastic all throughout the Beautiful Sounds of Revenge. I totally get lost in his vocal skills in every song; so much I almost block everything else out, like he puts me in a trance." A review from Sonic Dissonance stated "Lo-Pro's music is good, catchy, up-beat, and radio ready" and that they play "...an aggressive style with high quality melodies and biting lyrics." Reviewers have praised the band's lyrics, stating "...lyrically...There are layers here and in fact, some unexpected depth."

== Track listing ==
CD
No.	Title	Length
1.	"Blame Me"	3:19
2.	"Texas"	3:34
3.	"Pushed Aside"	3:26
4.	"A Life That’s Just Begun"	3:44
5.	"Wasting Away"	3:32
6.	"Ingenious"	4:07
7.	"Alive"	3:42
8.	"Hang On"	3:54
9.	"All I Have"	3:43
10.	"Say"	2:06
11.	"Clean The Slate"	3:59
12.	"Early Morning Anger"	3:08
13.	"Breathe"	4:01
14.	"Letting Go"	5:09
15.	"Novocaine (iTunes bonus track)"	3:31
Total length:		47:58

=== Track list background ===
A number of the songs from The Beautiful Sounds of Revenge were available in various forms of the course of the seven year development time of the album.

"Texas", "Hang On", "Alive", "Breathe", and "Letting Go" all appeared on the band's previous release, the Letting Go EP. The ones on The Beautiful Sounds of Revenge are identical.

"Ingenious", "Blame Me", "All I Have", and "Clean the Slate" were all available for streaming well before the album released in various forms. A demo version of "Ingenious" was made available for streaming as far back as May 2005. A demo version of "Blame Me" was available for streaming a year later in June 2006. respectively on the band's Myspace. An early acoustic version of "Clean the Slate" was made available for streaming from the band's acoustic Myspace account in 2007. A live acoustic version of "All I Have" was performed in 2007 and made available for streaming in 2008.

Closer to the album's release, the album version of "A Life That's Just Begun" was available to stream on YouTube just before midnight on December 31, 2009. It was taken down a few days later. Also, "Pushed Aside", was posted for streaming about a month before the album's release. It was previously a song that had never been available for listening in recorded form, but had been played live in concert as far back as 2007, being confirmed by a set-list written by the band.

"Wasting Away", "Say", "Early Morning Anger", and "Novocaine" were the only songs that had never been heard previous to the album's release. "Novocaine" was written very late in the process of making the album, so it was included at the last minute as an iTunes bonus track.

"A Life That's Just Begun" is based on a scrapped rock version of "Letting Go". Once the band realized that "Letting Go" worked better as an acoustic track, the band used some of their prior work on it, most notably the drums, and wrote "A Life That's Just Begun" around it.

=== Song meanings ===
Singer Pete Murray has claimed that the album in general is about the "Lo-Pro experience" over the last seven years since their first album. "Blame Me" and "Early Morning Anger" are both about the emotions the band felt after being dropped by Geffen Records. Murray said of the songs "When we were on Geffen (where) we had this ‘all star team,' we had all these people working for us. The minute we lost our deal with Geffen, thing changed– my Blackberry used to vibrate non-stop. It was constantly ringing or e-mails were coming in. The minute we were dropped, it went completely dead. I turned off the thing a couple of weeks later. The business is just brutal. When you're hot and there's money around, everybody is right there for you. And, then when things go a little south, you really figure out who your friends are and who your friends are not". The song "Texas" is "sort of a fantasy about revenge...ultimately, it's about picking up and starting over and not necessarily feeling that you have to give anybody a reason. Just basically hitting the ‘reset button,'". "Wasting Away" was about Murray's philosophical thoughts over "wrestling with how much you're sacrificing for a dream or a pursuit in life. Is it worth it in the end...". "All I Have" was inspired about a news story regarding soldiers saying goodbye to their families in order to go off to war in Iraq, and how he felt when he received an email from a friend who was about to do the same".

=== Unreleased tracks ===
During the almost seven years of working on music between their self-titled album and The Beautiful Sounds of Revenge, the band was quoted on working on "over 26 songs". 16 songs will be formally released from these sessions, 15 from The Beautiful Sounds of Revenge, and 1 song that is exclusive to the Letting Go EP ("Today"). Below are an additional 6 songs that were not released on either. It is unknown if they will be released as b-sides for this album, on a future album, or never be released at all. Also, as this only amounts to 22 songs, it is also unknown if any other songs will ever surface.

Studio recordings

1. This is Not Goodbye (Acoustic) - (2007)
2. Consider This (Acoustic Filter Cover) - (2007)
3. This Way (Acoustic) - (2008)
4. Get Out of My Way - (2008)
5. You Lie - (2007)*
6. Drive (The Cars cover)* - (2008)

Of the studio recordings, 1-3 were available for streaming on the Lo-Pro Acoustic Myspace page, 4 was available for streaming on the bands main Myspace page, and 5-6 were only available for streaming off of lead singer Pete Murray's Myspace page.

== Personnel ==
- Pete Murray - vocals
- Neil Godfrey - guitar
- Pete Ricci - guitar
- Jerry Oliviera - bass
- Tommy Stewart - drums

Additional personnel

- Angus Cooke - cello (on "All I Have")
