= Lo-Pro (album) =

Studio album by Lo-Pro
- Released: September 30, 2003
- Recorded: 2003
- Studio: NRG Recording Studios (North Hollywood, California): Elementree Studios (Tarzana, California)
- Genre: Alternative metal; post-grunge; hard rock
- Length: 42:14
- Label: Geffen/413 Records
- Producer: Aaron Lewis; Don Gilmore

Lo-Pro chronology
Lo-Pro (2003)	Letting Go (2009)

Singles from Lo-Pro
- 1. "Sunday" Released: August 23, 2003

Professional ratings
Review scores
Source	Rating
AllMusic	4/5 stars

Lo-Pro is the debut studio album of Lo-Pro, released on September 30, 2003. It had one single in "Sunday" which garnered considerable radio play upon release. Throughout 2003 and 2004, Lo-Pro toured with groups like Staind and Three Days Grace in promotion of the album before being dropped from their record label.

== Background ==
Singer Pete Murray and guitarist Neil Godfrey had previously played together in the band Ultraspank. After releasing 2 albums in 1998 and 2000, the band split up in 2001. Burned out and disillusioned, everyone parted ways to do their own thing. However, Murray and Godfrey eventually got back together with making music. Godfrey summed it up as:

During the Spank progression Pete M. had always been doing his best to record stuff, keeping up on technology updates. By the end of that time he was getting really good with Pro-Tools. So I think about 2 or 3 weeks went by and I'd been playing my guitar. I called up Pete and said I had some ideas to lay down.The Spank guys were all going in different directions. With the pressures of the industry gone and the freedom to do anything I wanted, we started writing songs. The result was so refreshing in the fact that we could record ourselves and make these great sounding recordings we could listen to.

The demos they created in these sessions were the starting point for the album. Eventually, they were able to gain the attention of Aaron Lewis, lead singer of the band Staind, and was signed to his vanity label, "413 Records", through Geffen. Through this, they configured the rest of the band, and began work on the actual album, with producing being done by Aaron Lewis and Don Gilmore.

== Release ==
The album was released on September 30, 2003. It peaked at no. 9 on the Billboard Top Heatseekers chart, and stayed on the chart for two weeks. One single, "Sunday", was released from the album, and while it did receive moderate radio airplay, another single was never released, and the band was later dropped from the label in mid-2004.

Murray later would express a number of regrets on the album, ranging from it being "over-produced" to not releasing "Oblivion" as a single.

== Track listing ==
CD
No.	Title	Length
1.	"Fuel"	3:27
2.	"Not Me"	2:52
3.	"Sunday"	3:46
4.	"1Day"	3:22
5.	"Reach"	3:25
6.	"Walk Away"	3:12
7.	"Thread"	3:51
8.	"Oblivion"	3:19
9.	"Ignition"	3:37
10.	"Never"	3:07
11.	"Fake"	3:31
12.	"Bombz"	4:45
Total length:		42:14

== Known "homemade" demos ==
These are songs known to have been worked on by Pete Murray and Neil Godfrey when they were creating demos in one of their homes:

Demos
No.	Title	Length
1.	"Thread" (Early version of the song. Featured more electronics overall, and different guitar in the chorus.)	?
2.	"Ignition" (Vastly different version, almost unrecognizable with the exception of one lyric regarding "saying goodbye to the bright side")	?
3.	"Wheels" (Kept off the final album altogether. Keeps with the theme of the other known demos with being darker and having more electronic aspects than material on the final album. Was finally released in acoustic form on their acoustic album Bittersweet.)	?

== Single charts ==
Song	Chart	Peak position	Year
"Sunday"	Billboard Mainstream Rock Tracks	20	2004
"Sunday"	Billboard Modern Rock Tracks	27	2004

== Personnel ==
- Pete Murray - vocals, programming
- Neil Godfrey - guitar
- Pete Ricci - guitar
- John Fahnestock - bass
- Tommy Stewart - drums

Additional personnel

- Gayle Boulware - handclapping
