= Ultraspank =

American nu metal band

- Origin: Santa Barbara, California, U.S.
- Genres: Nu metal; alternative metal; industrial metal
- Years active: 1996–2001
- Label: Epic
- Past members: Pete Murray; Neil Godfrey; Jerry Oliviera; Dan Ogden; James "Fed" Carroll; Tyler Clark

Ultraspank was an American nu metal band from Santa Barbara, California. They released two albums, a self-titled album in 1998, and a follow-up, Progress, in 2000. The band disbanded shortly after the release of Progress in 2001 due to being dropped by their label due to poor sales of both albums.

== History ==
=== Formation (1995–1996) ===
The band was formed soon after the breakup of the band Indica, which contained three of the five original Ultraspank members; Tyler Clark, Dan Ogden, and Pete Murray, not to be confused with Australian singer Pete Murray. The three of them want to continue making music together, they wanted to change their sound, so they enlisted the help of Neil Godfrey, and eventually Jerry Oliveria, a bandmate of his in a previous band named "Good Mourning". They originally formed the band as "Spank", but for legal reasons they were forced to change it. Rob Zombie suggested they should call themselves Ultraspank, and the band ended up taking his suggestion.

=== Self-titled (1997–1999) ===
In 1997, the band signed to Epic Records. The band decided to go with this label due to them being famous at the time for previously breaking other heavy bands such as Korn and Rage Against the Machine into mainstream popularity. Their debut, self-titled album was released on March 31, 1998. While the president of the company at the time of their signing fully supported the band, he was shortly afterwards fired, and the band received less support from the new president. Despite the lack of support, the band still toured tirelessly for two years, mostly on their own support, even using their own tour van, which racked up over 100,000 miles during the time.

The band became demoralized with all the work being put into without any backing from the label. However, the band received another break. They were able to get one of their songs, "Five", on the PlayStation video game 3Xtreme. This brought the band more exposure, as it was quoted as selling "400,000 units". This brought them more support from Epic, so the band started work on a follow-up album.

=== Progress (2000–2001) ===
After the heavy touring in support of their first album, the band returned to the studio for their followup Progress. Sonically, vocalist described the goal of the album was that he "wanted to go further out on the melodic tip. As a band, our groove is one of the things we pride ourselves on the most, but there's a lot more melody on this record. It's not happy melody, but it's still emotional music."

The name of the album represented a number of things for the band. Jerry Oliviera expanded on this in an interview, saying it's "...a statement on where we're heading together as a society. The cover is a real photo, from a genetic engineering project, of a mouse with a human ear growing out of its back. It's supposed to be like, 'we're growing ears out of animals' backs. Yeah, that's progress.'". The album name also represented the album's matured sound in comparison to the first, in its using of acoustic guitar, and using programming more to their advantage.

Murray claims that the recording sessions were so intense, that there were many times where he or Godfrey would need to leave for a break, and that the album can still be hard for them to listen to on an emotional level.

Progress was released on May 30, 2000, but didn't sell very well, yet again due to a lack of promotion. As a result, the band was dropped by their record label, leading to a breakup.

=== Post-breakup (2002–present) ===
After the break up, Murray took some time away from music, while Godfrey joined downthesun and Motograter for a short period. After leaving those bands, he went on to form Lo-Pro with former vocalist Murray in 2002. The band has released two albums, a self-titled release in 2003 and The Beautiful Sounds of Revenge in 2010, and the band is still presently together.

In 2008, rumors arose about the band reuniting. However, things had been taken out of context, as what was being referenced to was that guitarist Oliviera was joining Lo-Pro as a replacement bassist, making it so now Lo-Pro had three Ultraspank members in the band. The "reuniting" was that Murray, Godrey, and Oliviera all played on Lo-Pro's 2010 release The Beautiful Sounds of Revenge as they had in both Ultraspank releases.

== Discography ==
Year	Album details	Sales
1998	Ultraspank: Released: March 31, 1998; Label: Epic	US: 29,752
2000	Progress: Released: May 30, 2000; Label: Epic	US: 20,839

== Song appearances ==
- The song "Five" was featured on the 3Xtreme Video Game. A music video featuring the band playing live can be seen by successfully completing the game.
- The songs "Click" and "Crumble" are present in ATV Offroad Fury.

== Members ==
=== Final lineup ===
- Pete Murray – vocals, programming (1996–2001)
- Neil Godfrey – lead guitar (1996–2001)
- Jerry Oliviera – rhythm guitar (1996–2001)
- Dan Odgen – bass (1996–2001)
- James "Fed" Carroll – drums (1998–2001)

=== Former members ===
- Tyler Clark – drums (1996–1998)
