= A Decade of Destruction, Volume 2 =

Compilation album by Five Finger Death Punch
- Released: October 9, 2020
- Recorded: 2007–2020
- Genre: Groove metal; alternative metal; hard rock
- Length: 62:54
- Label: Prospect Park
- Producer: Kevin Churko

Five Finger Death Punch chronology
F8 (2020)	A Decade of Destruction, Volume 2 (2020)	AfterLife (2022)

Five Finger Death Punch chronology
A Decade of Destruction (2017)	The Wrong Side of Heaven, Volumes 1 and 2 (2023)

Professional ratings
Review scores
Source	Rating
AllMusic	3.5/5 stars

A Decade of Destruction, Volume 2 is the second compilation album by American heavy metal band Five Finger Death Punch. Released on October 9, 2020, the work was published by Prospect Park. It was the band's final release through Prospect Park.

== Track listing ==
No.	Title	Original album	Length
1.	"Blue on Black"	And Justice for None	4:34
2.	"The Tragic Truth"	American Capitalist (digital version)	3:55
3.	"Broken World"	Previously unreleased	3:01
4.	"I Refuse"	And Justice for None	3:38
5.	"The Pride"	American Capitalist	3:23
6.	"Hard to See"	War Is the Answer	3:29
7.	"When the Seasons Change"	And Justice for None	3:47
8.	"Cradle to the Grave"	The Wrong Side of Heaven and the Righteous Side of Hell, Volume 2	3:18
9.	"Sham Pain"	And Justice for None	3:29
10.	"M.I.N.E (End This Way)"	The Wrong Side of Heaven and the Righteous Side of Hell, Volume 1	4:05
11.	"Hell to Pay"	Got Your Six	3:07
12.	"Never Enough"	The Way of the Fist (2008 reissue)	3:29
13.	"Walk Away"	War Is the Answer	3:42
14.	"Wrong Side of Heaven" (acoustic version)	Previously unreleased, original version appeared on The Wrong Side of Heaven and the Righteous Side of Hell, Volume 1	4:30
15.	"Trouble (Felmax remix)"	Previously unreleased, original version appeared on the deluxe edition of And Justice for None and the previous A Decade of Destruction	2:14
16.	"Wash It All Away (Joe Hahn remix)"	Previously unreleased, original version appeared on Got Your Six	4:50
17.	"Bad Company (The Five Finger Dim Mak Steve Aoki remix)" (Bad Company cover)	Previously unreleased, original FFDP version appeared on War Is the Answer	4:23
Total length:			62:54

== Personnel ==
- Ivan Moody – vocals
- Zoltan Bathory – rhythm guitar
- Chris Kael – bass, backing vocals (tracks 1–5, 7–11, 14–16), unclean vocals on "Broken World"
- Charlie Engen – drums on "Broken World"
- Andy James – lead guitar on "Broken World"
- Jeremy Spencer – drums (tracks 1–2, 4–17)
- Darrell Roberts – guitars on "Never Enough"
- Jason Hook – guitars (tracks 1–2, 4–11, 13–17)
- Matt Snell – bass (tracks 6, 12, 13, 17)

== Charts ==
Chart performance for A Decade of Destruction, Volume 2
Chart (2020)	Peak position
Australian Albums (ARIA)	98
Austrian Albums (Ö3 Austria)	56
German Albums (Offizielle Top 100)	45
Swiss Albums (Schweizer Hitparade)	68
US Billboard 200	130
