= A Decade of Destruction =

Compilation album by Five Finger Death Punch
- Released: December 1, 2017
- Recorded: 2007–2017
- Genre: Groove metal; alternative metal; hard rock
- Length: 63:44
- Label: Prospect Park; Eleven Seven

Five Finger Death Punch chronology
Got Your Six (2015)	A Decade of Destruction (2017)	And Justice for None (2018)

Five Finger Death Punch non-studio chronology
Purgatory (Tales from the Pit) (2013)	A Decade of Destruction (2017)	A Decade of Destruction, Volume 2 (2020)

Singles from A Decade of Destruction
- 1. "Trouble" Released: October 27, 2017; 2. "Gone Away" Released: December 22, 2017

Professional ratings
Review scores
Source	Rating
AllMusic	4/5 stars
Metal Hammer	3.5/5 stars

A Decade of Destruction is the first compilation album by American heavy metal band Five Finger Death Punch. It was released on December 1, 2017, by Prospect Park. On October 27, 2017, the band issued "Trouble", the first of two new songs included on the album.

== Background ==
On October 27, 2017, the website Metal Injection reported that the band's drummer and author Jeremy Spencer had stated to Razor 94.7: "It just seems like it just started even though it's been 10 years. We're always wrapped up in our vacuum in our cocoon of our daily life. So you don't pay attention to that stuff and now we're like 'we have a greatest hits'. And the label thought it was the right time. So we were like 'Cool, let's put some new songs on it though'. We don't wanna make... cause people can pretty much... ya know they have the records already. But now this is a cool package with different stuff on it. The artwork's really rad on it. It's cool".

== Track listing ==
No.	Title	Original album	Length
1.	"Trouble"	Previously unreleased	3:12
2.	"Gone Away" (The Offspring cover)	Previously unreleased	4:35
3.	"Lift Me Up" (featuring Rob Halford of Judas Priest)	The Wrong Side of Heaven and the Righteous Side of Hell, Volume 1	4:06
4.	"Wash It All Away"	Got Your Six	3:45
5.	"Bad Company" (Bad Company cover)	War Is the Answer	4:22
6.	"Under and Over It"	American Capitalist	3:38
7.	"Wrong Side of Heaven"	The Wrong Side of Heaven and the Righteous Side of Hell, Volume 1	4:31
8.	"House of the Rising Sun" (The Animals cover)	The Wrong Side of Heaven and the Righteous Side of Hell, Volume 2	4:07
9.	"I Apologize"	Got Your Six (deluxe edition)	4:03
10.	"The Bleeding"	The Way of the Fist	4:28
11.	"Jekyll and Hyde"	Got Your Six	3:26
12.	"Remember Everything"	American Capitalist	4:38
13.	"Coming Down"	American Capitalist	4:01
14.	"My Nemesis"	Got Your Six	3:35
15.	"Battle Born"	The Wrong Side of Heaven and the Righteous Side of Hell, Volume 2	3:43
16.	"Far from Home"	War Is the Answer	3:32
Total length:			1:03:44

== Personnel ==
- Ivan Moody – vocals
- Zoltan Bathory – guitars
- Jeremy Spencer – drums, percussion
- Jason Hook – guitars (tracks 1–9, 11–16)
- Chris Kael – bass (tracks 1–4, 6–9, 11–15)
- Matt Snell – bass (tracks 5, 10, 16)
- Darrell Roberts – guitars on "The Bleeding"
- Uros Raskovski – guitar solo on "The Bleeding"

== Charts ==
=== Weekly charts ===
Chart (2017–18)	Peak position
Australian Albums (ARIA)	30
Austrian Albums (Ö3 Austria)	52
Canadian Albums (Billboard)	30
German Albums (Offizielle Top 100)	36
New Zealand Heatseeker Albums (RMNZ)	2
Scottish Albums (OCC)	85
Swedish Albums (Sverigetopplistan)	45
UK Albums (OCC)	97
US Billboard 200	29
US Top Rock Albums (Billboard)	2

=== Year-end charts ===
Chart (2018)	Position
US Billboard 200	81
US Top Rock Albums (Billboard)	7

Chart (2019)	Position
US Billboard 200	171
US Top Rock Albums (Billboard)	24

Chart (2020)	Position
US Billboard 200	167
US Top Rock Albums (Billboard)	19

Chart (2021)	Position
US Top Rock Albums (Billboard)	30

=== Singles ===
Title	Year	Peak chart positions			
Title	Year	US Main.	US Rock	US Rock Air.	US Rock Digi.
"Trouble"	2017	5	10	35	4
"Gone Away"	2017	2	9	18	4

== Certifications ==
Region	Certification	Certified units/sales
United Kingdom (BPI)	Gold	100,000^{‡}
^{‡} Sales+streaming figures based on certification alone.
