= Greg Capullo =

American comic book artist and penciller

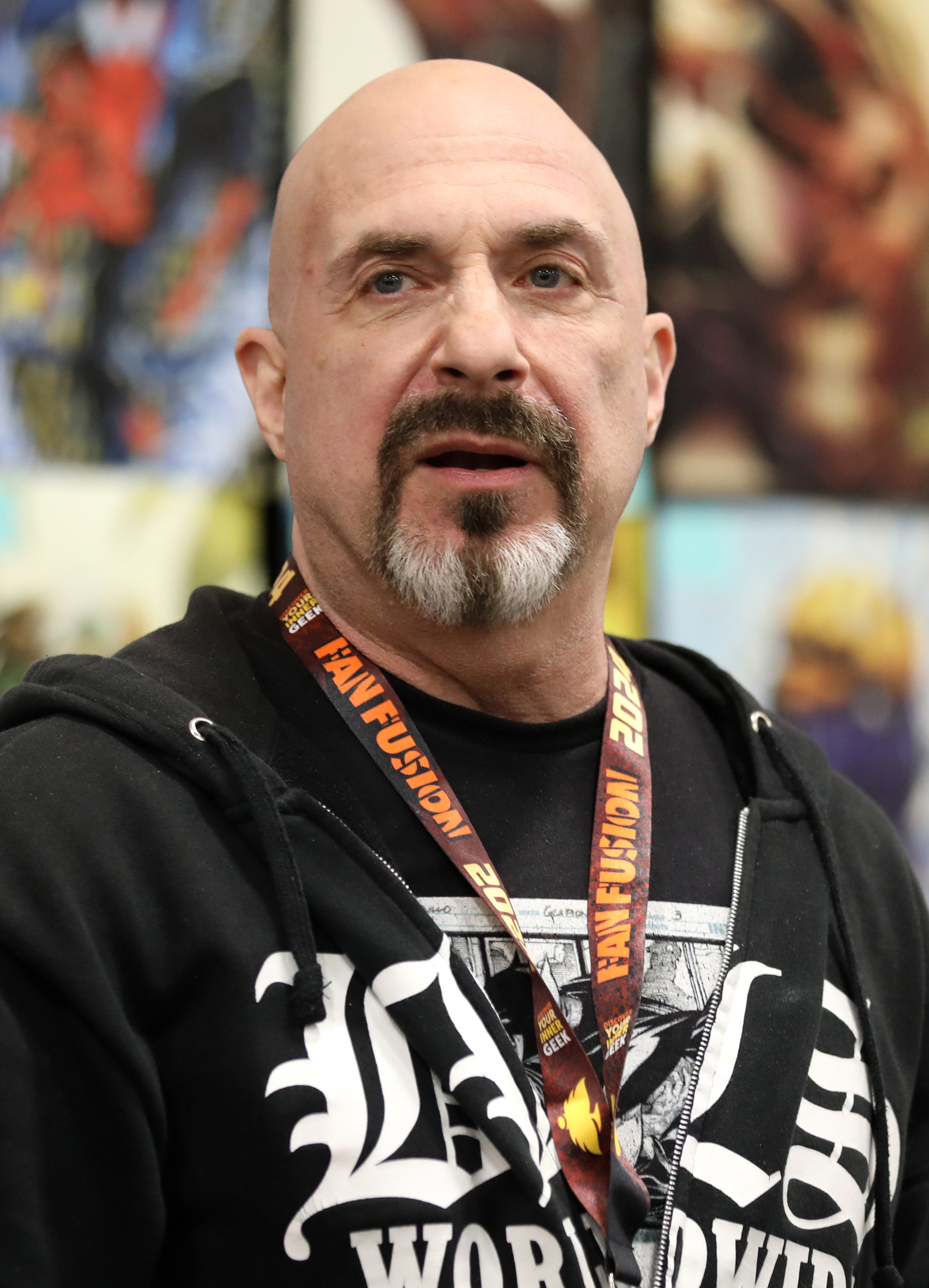
- Capullo in 2024
- Born: Gregory Capullo; March 30, 1962 (age 64) Schenectady, New York, U.S.
- Areas: Penciller, inker, cover artist
- Notable works: Quasar; X-Force; Spawn; Batman; Haunt; Reborn
- Awards: Inkpot Award (2015)

Gregory Capullo (/kəˈpʊloʊ/; born March 30, 1962) is an American comic book artist and penciller, best known for his work on Quasar (1991–1992), X-Force (1992–1993), Angela (1994), Spawn (1993–2000, 2003–2004), Batman (2011–2016), and Reborn (2016–2017). He also drew the DC Comics company-wide crossover storylines Dark Nights: Metal and Dark Nights: Death Metal. As part of his DC work, he co-created the characters, The Batman Who Laughs, Mr. Bloom, and the Court of Owls.

Greg Capullo also published his own creator-owned comic, The Creech, published through Image Comics. These were two three-issue miniseries.

Apart from comics, Capullo has been involved in several projects such as pencilling for the Iced Earth albums The Dark Saga and Something Wicked This Way Comes, the Korn album Follow the Leader and the Disturbed album, Ten Thousand Fists. He was also part of the crew who worked on the animated sequences in the 2002 film The Dangerous Lives of Altar Boys.

== Early life ==
Greg Capullo began drawing at an early age, and remembers that he drew his first drawing of Batman when he was 4. His preference for Batman persisted into his adulthood, with his favorite DC Comics graphic novel being Frank Miller's The Dark Knight Returns. He decided he wanted to be a professional artist early, having been influenced by creators such as John Buscema, Neal Adams, Gene Colan and Gil Kane. He also was influenced by artists outside of comics, such as painter Frank Frazetta, animator Chuck Jones, and Mad Magazine caricaturist Mort Drucker.

== Career ==
Capullo's first comic work was a publication called Gore Shriek, which was picked up and published by a comic book store in Albany, New York, called Fantaco Enterprises. Gore Shriek was a horror comic book specifically labeled Not Intended for Children because of the violent and graphic nature of it.

Due to the success of the small comic series, when it had ended, Capullo began work for Marvel Comics where he worked on Quasar, X-Force, and What If?. He worked with Marvel Comics for three years on various works, before moving on to other publications and projects with different companies.

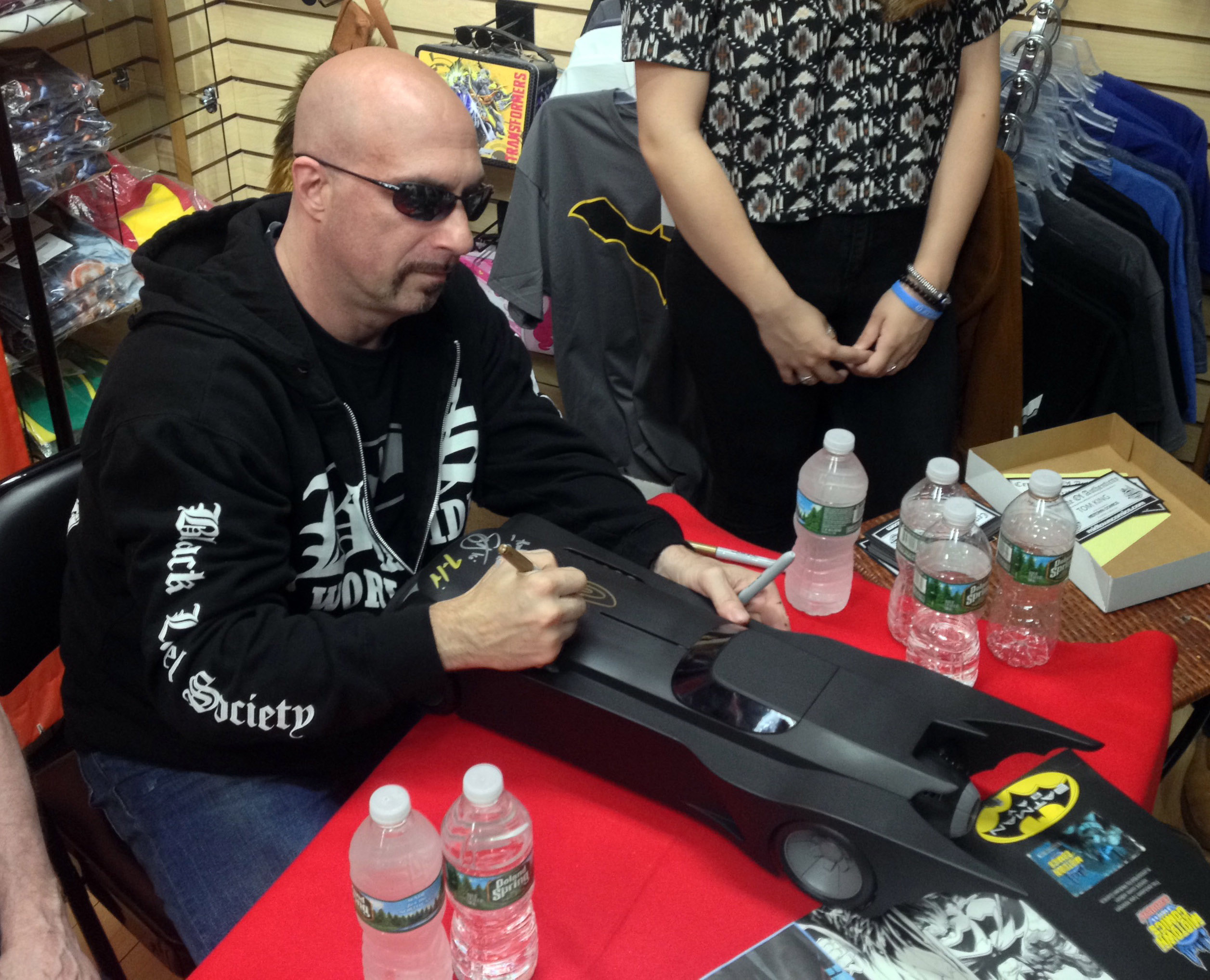
Capullo signing a Batmobile toy during an appearance at Midtown Comics

Briefly after Capullo had started work with Marvel, he had begun smaller independent projects away from the company. He had started involvement with separate labels and anyone who would hire him for miscellaneous odd-jobs that needed completion.

Todd McFarlane, who had left Marvel Comics to co-found Image Comics, noticed Capullo’s work on X-Force, and convinced him become the penciller on McFarlane’s comic, Spawn. Capullo's first issue of the book was #16, then took over as pencil artist with issue #26. Capullo has since done the cover art and pencils for many Image publications, including various Spawn tie-ins and variants, and Capullo’s own miniseries, The Creech. Capullo helped McFarlane in creating the artwork now seen on the two Halo 3-themed controllers.

In February 2007, Image Comics published The Art of Greg Capullo, a hardcover book showcasing Capullo’s artwork, ranging from widely recognized cover art to unknown never released pencils, early submissions samples and personal sketches.

Capullo provided layouts for Image's Haunt, which debuted in October 2009. The pencils for the layouts were done by Ryan Ottley up until issue 6, when Greg Capullo then took over pencilling for the series and became the regular penciller, with inks done by Todd McFarlane.

=== 2010s ===
In 2011 Capullo left the ongoing Haunt title in order to take on the art duties on Batman as part of DC Comics' 2011 company-wide title relaunch, The New 52, which paired him with writer Scott Snyder. The two creators worked together on the series for five years, creating a number of critically and fan-acclaimed stories, and reinventing classic characters for DC’s then-new continuity.

On September 9, 2013, he appeared as a special guest judge on "Skulls and Villains", a third season episode of the reality competition TV series Ink Master.

Capullo is responsible for the art on Five Finger Death Punch albums The Wrong Side of Heaven and the Righteous Side of Hell, Volume 1 and The Wrong Side of Heaven and the Righteous Side of Hell, Volume 2, plus the first single "Lift Me Up" . He has also done artwork for heavy metal bands, Iced Earth and Disturbed.

In 2013, he was named on IGN's list of "The Best Tweeters in Comics" for his "invigoratingly aggressive" posts on Twitter.

In April 2016 Snyder and Capullo's time on the Batman solo series ended with issue 51, and the series was relaunched with Tom King writing in May.

In October 2016, Capullo revealed that he was working on a project that he described as "very Batman-centric, and very rock n’ roll." That December, he revealed that he signed a new contract with DC Comics. Dark Nights: Metal was announced at Fan Expo Dallas in April 2017. The series' first issue was released in June of the same year, and featured a reunion between Capullo and Snyder. Capullo drew all six issues of the series, which concluded in March 2018.

Shortly before the release of the last issue of Metal, DC announced that Capullo would join Snyder for his Black Label book Batman: The Last Knight on Earth, replacing the previously announced Sean Gordon Murphy.

Capullo drew variant covers for the 2018 Justice League Dark series' first four issues. He also provided a variant cover for Snyder's The Batman Who Laughs miniseries, a spin-off of their Metal event. Capullo drew Snyder's 8-page story for Detective Comics' 1000th issue, which was the first in the book. He also provided the 2010s variant cover.

In February 2019 the cover to the first issue of The Last Knight on Earth was revealed, and in March the first color interiors for the book were revealed at Wondercon, though Capullo frequently shared art in various stages of development on his social media.

In July 2022, during San Diego Comic-Con 2022, it was announced that Capullo would be illustrating a new Batman/Spawn crossover, with McFarlane writing and releasing in December 2022.

In July 2023, it was announced at San Diego Comic-Con 2023 that Capullo would be returning to Marvel to draw a series of variant covers the first of which was for Wolverine (2020) #37. In September 2023, the second and third Marvel variant covers drawn by Capullo were announced for Moon Knight #30 and Vengeance of the Moon Knight #1. In November 2023, the fourth Marvel variant cover drawn by Capullo was announced for Incredible Hulk #9. That same month, Capullo announced that he had signed a contract with Marvel for more cover work and an unannounced series.

In May 2024, it was announced that Capullo would illustrate a new Marvel miniseries starring Wolverine which will be written by writer Jonathan Hickman. The miniseries, titled Wolverine: Revenge will release its first issue on August 24, 2024 and will feature a red band version that will contain extra violence and extra pages.

== Bibliography ==
=== Interior work ===
==== Marvel Comics ====
- What If? #2 (1989)
- Avengers Spotlight #39 (1990)
- Quasar #18–25, 27–29, 31–32, 35–39 (1991–1992)
- X-Force #15–25, Annual #1 (1992–1993)
- Stryfe's Strike File #1 (1993)
- X-Men Unlimited #1 (1993)
- Wolverine: Revenge #1-5 (2024)
- Deadpool/Batman #1 (2025)

==== DC Comics ====
- Batman (Vol. 2) #0–11, 13–17, 19–27, 29–33, 35–43, 45–48, 50–51 (2011–2016)
- Dark Nights: Metal #1–6 (2017–2018)
- Batman (Vol. 3) #50 (2018)
- Swamp Thing Halloween Giant #1 (2018)
- Detective Comics #1000 (story "Batman's Longest Case") (2019)
- Batman: Last Knight on Earth #1–3 (2019)
- Dark Nights: Death Metal #1–7 (2020–2021)
- Batman/Spawn #1 (2022)

==== Image Comics ====
- Spawn #16–20, 26–37, 39, 41, 43, 45, 47, 49–75, 78–100, 174, 175, 193, 199–200, 300–301 (1993–2000, 2019)
- Angela #1–3 (1994)
- The Creech #1–3 (1997)
- The Creech: Out For Blood #1–3 (2001)
- Haunt #1–5 (layouts only), 6–18 (2009–2011)
- Reborn #1–6, (2016–2017)

=== Cover work ===
==== Marvel Comics ====
- Web of Spider-Man #1 (2024)

==== DC Comics ====
- Green Lantern (Vol. 5) #1 (variant cover) (2011)
- The Flash (Vol. 4) #2 (variant cover) (2011)
- Justice League (Vol. 1) #3 (variant cover) (2011)
- Batman (Vol. 2) #1-52 (2011–2016)
- Detective Comics (Vol. 2) #15 (2013), #27 (2014)
- Detective Comics #27 Special Edition (2014)
- Dark Knight III: The Master Race #1–9 (midtown comics variant covers) (2015–2017)
- Justice League Dark #1–4 (variant covers) (2018)
- Batman The Court Of Owls Saga Essential Edition (new cover) (2018)
- Detective Comics (Vol. 3) #1000 (2010s variant cover)
- The Batman Who Laughs #1 (variant cover) (2018)
- DC's Year of the Villain #1 (2019)
- Nightwing (Vol. 4) #62 (variant cover) (2019)
- Batman Black and White #1 (2020)
- Gotham Knights: Gilded City (variant) #1–6 (2022)

==== Image Comics ====
- Image United #2 (variant cover) (2009)
- Medieval Spawn Witchblade (Vol. 2) #2 (variant cover) (2018)

=== Writer ===
==== Image Comics ====
- Creech #1–3 (1997)
- Creech: Out For Blood #1–3 (2001)
