= 2020 in downloadable songs for the Rock Band series =

- Songs released: 106
- Packs released: 3
- Albums released: 0

The Rock Band series of music video games supports downloadable songs for the Xbox One and PlayStation 4 versions through the consoles' respective online services. Users can download songs on a track-by-track basis, with many of the tracks also offered as part of a "song pack" or complete album at a discounted rate. All songs that are available to Rock Band 3 are playable in Rock Band Blitz.

Rock Band 4 was unveiled in March 2015, and released on October 6, 2015.

== List of songs released in 2020 ==
The following table lists the available songs for the Rock Band series released in 2020. All songs available in packs are also available as individual song downloads on the same date, unless otherwise noted. Dates listed are the initial release of songs on PlayStation Network and Xbox Live.

Starting from October 6, 2015, all music added to the downloadable content catalog is exclusive to Rock Band 4. In addition, due to changes in the charting format and gameplay of Rock Band 4, the released songs no longer support keyboard or Pro guitar and bass (future downloadable content will continue to support vocal harmonies and Pro drum charts), and most songs no longer display "family friendly" or "supervision recommended" ratings. Downloadable content from previous Rock Band titles (excepting The Beatles: Rock Band) is forward-compatible in Rock Band 4 within the same system family (Xbox 360 downloads are usable in the Xbox One version and PlayStation 3 downloads are usable in the PlayStation 4 version) at no additional cost.

Song title	Artist	Year	Genre	Single / Pack name	Release date
"Father of All..."	Green Day	2020	Alternative	Single	Jan 9, 2020
"The End of the Game"	Weezer	2020	Alternative	Single	Jan 9, 2020
"Young Bloods" (Note: Song was previously released as part of the Rock Band Network.)	The Bronx	2008	Punk	Single	Jan 16, 2020
"I Just Wanna Shine"	Fitz and the Tantrums	2019	Pop-Rock	Single	Jan 16, 2020
"All the Way (Stay)"	Jimmy Eat World	2019	Alternative	Single	Jan 23, 2020
"Chelsea"	The Summer Set	2009	Pop-Rock	Single	Jan 23, 2020
"Circles"	Post Malone	2019	Pop-Rock	Single	Jan 30, 2020
"Can You Tell"	Ra Ra Riot	2008	Indie Rock	Single	Jan 30, 2020
"Addicted"	Simple Plan	2002	Alternative	Simple Plan 01	Feb 6, 2020
"Welcome to My Life"	Simple Plan	2004	Alternative	Simple Plan 01	Feb 6, 2020
"Where I Belong"	Simple Plan & State Champs feat. We the Kings	2019	Alternative	Simple Plan 01	Feb 6, 2020
"No More Mr. Nice Guy"	Alice Cooper	1973	Rock	Single	Feb 13, 2020
"Mechanical Love"	In This Moment	2008	Metal	Single	Feb 13, 2020
"50,000 Unstoppable Watts"	Clutch	2009	Rock	Single	Feb 20, 2020
"Hanuman"	Rodrigo y Gabriela	2009	Rock	Single	Feb 20, 2020
"Inside Out"	Five Finger Death Punch	2020	Metal	Single	Feb 27, 2020
"Novocaine"	The Unlikely Candidates	2019	Alternative	Single	Feb 27, 2020
"Sticks & Bricks"	A Day to Remember	2010	Punk	Single	Mar 5, 2020
"5678"	Fake Problems	2010	Alternative	Single	Mar 5, 2020
"Mordecai"	Between the Buried and Me	2003	Prog	Single	Mar 12, 2020
"Icarus Lives"	Periphery	2010	Metal	Single	Mar 12, 2020
"The Best"	AWOLNATION	2019	Alternative	Single	Mar 19, 2020
"Colors"	Black Pumas	2019	Alternative	Single	Mar 19, 2020
"Some Kind of Disaster"	All Time Low	2020	Emo	Single	Mar 26, 2020
"Better Off This Way"	A Day to Remember	2010	Punk	Single	Mar 26, 2020
"Abigail"	Motionless in White	2010	Metal	Single	Apr 2, 2020
"Approach the Podium"	Winds of Plague	2009	Metal	Single	Apr 2, 2020
"Don't Start Now"	Dua Lipa	2019	Pop/Dance/Electronic	Single	Apr 9, 2020
"Simmer"	Hayley Williams	2020	Alternative	Single	Apr 9, 2020
"Boy"	Ra Ra Riot	2010	Indie Rock	Single	Apr 16, 2020
"One Man Band"	Old Dominion	2019	Country	Single	Apr 16, 2020
"Juice" (Note: Song was initially pulled from the Rock Band store due to accidentally having the word "nigga" charted in the vocals. A patch was released a week later, which censored the word.)	Lizzo	2019	Pop/Dance/Electronic	Single	Apr 23, 2020
"Bad Decisions"	The Strokes	2020	Rock	Single	Apr 23, 2020
"Alive and Kicking"	Nonpoint	2005	Rock	Single	Apr 30, 2020
"Born to Be Wild"	Steppenwolf	1968	Classic Rock	Single	Apr 30, 2020
"Rolling 7s"	Dirty Honey	2019	Rock	Single	May 7, 2020
"Special Effects"	Freezepop	2010	Pop/Dance/Electronic	Single	May 7, 2020
"Reckless & Relentless"	Asking Alexandria	2011	Metal	Single	May 14, 2020
"Arcaedion"	Children of Nova	2009	Prog	Single	May 14, 2020
"Glycerine"	Bush	1994	Grunge	Single	May 21, 2020
"With Arms Wide Open"	Creed	1999	Rock	Single	May 21, 2020
"Be Careful What You Wish For"	Memphis May Fire	2010	Metal	Single	May 28, 2020
"Hook, Line and Sinner"	Texas in July	2009	Metal	Single	May 28, 2020
"Far Away"	Breaking Benjamin ft. Scooter Ward of COLD	2020	Rock	Single	Jun 4, 2020
"Level of Concern"	Twenty One Pilots	2020	Alternative	Single	Jun 4, 2020
"Where Were You?"	Every Avenue	2008	Alternative	Single	Jun 11, 2020
"Falling"	Trevor Daniel	2020	Pop/Dance/Electronic	Single	Jun 11, 2020
"I Think We're Alone Now"	Billie Joe Armstrong	2020	Alternative	Single	Jun 18, 2020
"Van Horn"	Saint Motel	2019	Indie Rock	Single	Jun 18, 2020
"Dark Horse"	Converge	2009	Metal	Single	Jun 25, 2020
"Popular Monster"	Falling In Reverse	2019	Rock	Single	Jun 25, 2020
"10,000 Hours"	Dan + Shay & Justin Bieber	2019	Country	Single	Jul 2, 2020
"Used To Like"	Neon Trees	2019	Alternative	Single	Jul 2, 2020
"Bang!"	AJR	2020	Pop-Rock	Single	Jul 9, 2020
"Incubus"	Amberian Dawn	2009	Metal	Single	Jul 9, 2020
"Adore You"	Harry Styles	2019	Pop/Dance/Electronic	Single	Jul 16, 2020
"Wars"	Of Monsters and Men	2019	Indie Rock	Single	Jul 16, 2020
"Learn to Live"	Architects	2011	Metal	Single	Jul 23, 2020
"Killing Me Slowly"	Bad Wolves	2019	Rock	Single	Jul 23, 2020
"Ikea"	Jonathan Coulton	2003	Rock	Single	Jul 30, 2020
"This is Not a Song, It's a Sandwich!"	Psychostick	2009	Metal	Single	Jul 30, 2020
"Shiver"	Coldplay	2000	Alternative	Coldplay Parachutes to Everyday Life Pack	Aug 6, 2020
"Speed of Sound"	Coldplay	2005	Alternative	Coldplay Parachutes to Everyday Life Pack	Aug 6, 2020
"Champion of the World" (Note: Song was initially released exclusively bundled with the Coldplay Parachutes to Everyday Life Pack. It was released individually on August 13, 2020.)	Coldplay	2019	Alternative	Coldplay Parachutes to Everyday Life Pack	Aug 6, 2020
"Something Just Like This"	The Chainsmokers & Coldplay	2017	Pop/Dance/Electronic	Coldplay Parachutes to Everyday Life Pack	Aug 6, 2020
"Buttersnips"	Periphery	2010	Metal	Single	Aug 20, 2020
"Burning Hearts"	Silverstein	2011	Rock	Single	Aug 20, 2020
"Cradles"	Sub Urban	2019	Pop/Dance/Electronic	Single	Aug 27, 2020
"Blinding Lights"	The Weeknd	2019	Pop/Dance/Electronic	Single	Aug 27, 2020
"We Are the One"	Anti-Flag	2009	Punk	Single	Sep 3, 2020
"History of Violence"	Theory of a Deadman	2019	Rock	Single	Sep 3, 2020
"Antisocialist"	Asking Alexandria	2020	Metal	Single	Sep 10, 2020
"Deathbed Atheist"	Norma Jean	2010	Metal	Single	Sep 10, 2020
"Monsters"	All Time Low ft. Blackbear	2020	Emo	Single	Sep 17, 2020
"Flightless Bird, American Mouth"	Iron & Wine	2007	Indie Rock	Single	Sep 17, 2020
"I Know What I Am"	Band of Skulls	2009	Indie Rock	Single	Sep 24, 2020
"I Hope"	Gabby Barrett	2020	Country	Single	Sep 24, 2020
"Angels & Demons"	Jxdn	2020	Alternative	Single	Oct 1, 2020
"Stand for Something"	Skindred	2009	Metal	Single	Oct 1, 2020
"Some1Else" (Note: Song is available at no cost.)	Blame It On Whitman	2020	Punk	5th Anniversary Free DLC Pack	Oct 8, 2020
"Run With You"	Radio Compass	2020	Indie Rock	5th Anniversary Free DLC Pack	Oct 8, 2020
"Masquerader"	Ravi Shavi	2020	Indie Rock	5th Anniversary Free DLC Pack	Oct 8, 2020
"Stevie Sees"	Toad and the Stooligans	2020	Hip-Hop/Rap	5th Anniversary Free DLC Pack	Oct 8, 2020
"Any Other Heart"	Go Radio	2011	Pop-Rock	Single	Oct 15, 2020
"Teenage Dirtbag (2020)"	Wheatus	2020	Pop-Rock	Single	Oct 15, 2020
"Fate of the Maiden"	Amberian Dawn	2008	Metal	Single	Oct 22, 2020
"Selkies: The Endless Obsession"	Between the Buried and Me	2005	Metal	Single	Oct 22, 2020
"A Little Bit Off"	Five Finger Death Punch	2020	Metal	Single	Oct 29, 2020
"The Devil Went Down to Georgia"	Nickelback	2020	Rock	Single	Oct 29, 2020
"CITY OF ANGELS"	24kGoldn	2019	Hip-Hop/Rap	Single	Nov 5, 2020
"Spin"	We the Kings	2009	Alternative	Single	Nov 5, 2020
"White Knuckles"	OK Go	2010	Alternative	Single	Nov 12, 2020
"Caution"	The Killers	2020	Alternative	Single	Nov 12, 2020
"Alive With The Glory Of Love"	Say Anything	2004	Emo	Single	Nov 19, 2020
"Cute Without The 'E' (Cut From the Team)"	Taking Back Sunday	2002	Emo	Single	Nov 19, 2020
"Shot in the Dark"	AC/DC	2020	Rock	Single	Nov 24, 2020
"Death by Rock and Roll"	The Pretty Reckless	2020	Rock	Single	Nov 24, 2020
"Come & Go"	Juice WRLD & Marshmello	2020	Hip-Hop/Rap	Single	Dec 3, 2020
"Rollin' (Air Raid Vehicle)"	Limp Bizkit	2000	Nu-Metal	Single	Dec 3, 2020
"Rebel Rebel"	David Bowie	1974	Rock	Single	Dec 10, 2020
"My Way, Soon"	Greta Van Fleet	2020	Rock	Single	Dec 10, 2020
"Stacy's Mom"	Fountains of Wayne	2003	Pop-Rock	Single	Dec 17, 2020
"Prisoner"	Dance Gavin Dance	2020	Indie Rock	Single	Dec 17, 2020
"Come and Get Your Love"	Redbone	1974	R&B/Soul/Funk	Single	Dec 22, 2020
"Golden"	Harry Styles	2019	Pop-Rock	Single	Dec 29, 2020
"Higher"	Shawn Mendes	2020	Pop/Dance/Electronic	Single	Dec 29, 2020
