= The Wrong Side of Heaven and the Righteous Side of Hell, Volume 2 =

Studio album by Five Finger Death Punch
- Released: November 19, 2013
- Recorded: 2012–2013 at The Hideout Studios, Las Vegas, Nevada
- Genre: Groove metal; alternative metal; hard rock
- Length: 40:17
- Label: Prospect Park
- Producer: Kevin Churko; Five Finger Death Punch

Five Finger Death Punch chronology
The Wrong Side of Heaven and the Righteous Side of Hell, Volume 1 (2013)	The Wrong Side of Heaven and the Righteous Side of Hell, Volume 2 (2013)	Got Your Six (2015)

Singles from The Wrong Side of Heaven and the Righteous Side of Hell, Volume 2
- 1. "Battle Born" Released: September 10, 2013; 2. "House of the Rising Sun" Released: February 3, 2014

Professional ratings
Review scores
Source	Rating
AllMusic	3.5/5 stars
The Guardian	3/5 stars
Jukebox Metal	4/5 stars
Melodic	5/5 stars
Sputnikmusic	2/5

The Wrong Side of Heaven and the Righteous Side of Hell, Volume 2 (also known as The Righteous Side of Hell) is the fifth studio album by American heavy metal band Five Finger Death Punch, and the second of two albums released by the band in 2013, with Volume 1 having been released on July 30. It was released on November 19, 2013 through Prospect Park. The album was entirely produced by Kevin Churko and Five Finger Death Punch.

== Background ==
On February 15, 2013, Five Finger Death Punch announced that they were working on their fourth album. On March 18, the band posted a promotional video for an upcoming tour with a new song titled "Here to Die".

On May 1, 2013, the band announced that they would be releasing two studio albums in the year, with The Wrong Side of Heaven and the Righteous Side of Hell, Volume 1 being released on July 30, and Volume 2 following on November 19. Guitarist Zoltan Bathory said of the band's decision to release two albums:

"We came off the road after a couple of great years of touring and were really amped up to write the 4th record. Everybody was in the right headspace and the band tighter than ever so it was a perfect storm. We jumped in head first and found ourselves 12–13 songs deep fairly quick but were still coming up with better and better material so we looked at each other and said... okay why stop there?... let’s keep going. Once we passed the 24th song we knew we’re going to have to do a double album. We had this massive amount of music that’s very dear to us, possibly the best material this band has ever created. At that point there was no way to decide which songs to leave off the album. So we made the decision to release them all."

== Singles ==
The album's first single, "Battle Born", was released on September 10, 2013. The song's given title is a reference to the Flag of Nevada, the home state of the band.

The second single, a folk traditional cover of "House of the Rising Sun", was released on February 3, 2014.

== Commercial performance ==
Preorders for the album went up on iTunes on August 10, 2013. On its release, the album debuted at No. 2 on the Billboard 200 and No. 1 on Top Rock Albums, selling 77,000 copies in its first week. The album has sold 510,000 copies in the US as of July 2015.

== Track listing ==
All tracks are written by Ivan Moody, Zoltan Bathory, Jason Hook, Jeremy Spencer and Kevin Churko, except where noted.

Standard edition and disc one of deluxe edition
No.	Title	Length
1.	"Here to Die"	3:00
2.	"Weight Beneath My Sin"	3:36
3.	"Wrecking Ball"	3:13
4.	"Battle Born"	3:43
5.	"Cradle to the Grave"	3:18
6.	"Matter of Time"	3:16
7.	"The Agony of Regret" (interlude)	1:42
8.	"Cold"	3:47
9.	"Let This Go"	3:16
10.	"My Heart Lied"	3:35
11.	"A Day in My Life"	3:44
12.	"House of the Rising Sun" (The Animals cover)	4:07
Total length:		40:17

The Wrong Side of Heaven and the Righteous Side of Hell, Volume 1 and Volume 2 Ultimate Collector's box set and 10th Anniversary vinyl box set
No.	Title	Length
13.	"Weight Beneath My Sin" (featuring Ryan Clark of Demon Hunter)	3:39
14.	"Burn MF" (Mr. Kane and Nikka Bling remix) (featuring Rob Zombie)	2:50

Japanese bonus track
No.	Title	Length
13.	"Burn MF" (Mr. Kane and Nikka Bling remix) (featuring Rob Zombie)	2:50

Deluxe edition (disc two of deluxe edition; disc two is a live album)*
No.	Title	Length
1.	"Intro"	1:00
2.	"Under and Over It"	4:09
3.	"Burn It Down"	4:07
4.	"American Capitalist"	3:33
5.	"Hard to See"	3:45
6.	"Coming Down"	5:07
7.	"Bad Company"	4:57
8.	"White Knuckles"	10:00
9.	"Drum Solo"	4:16
10.	"Far from Home"	2:29
11.	"Never Enough"	3:42
12.	"War Is the Answer"	5:44
13.	"Remember Everything"	5:14
14.	"No One Gets Left Behind"	3:49
15.	"The Bleeding"	7:16
Total length:		69:08

*Unlike Volume 1, it contains video of the performances, rather than the songs themselves.

*Track 13 and 14 are not on the physical disc, they are digital downloads bought with the box set.

== Charts ==
Chart (2013)	Peak position
Austrian Albums (Ö3 Austria)	17
Canadian Albums (Billboard)	6
German Albums Chart (Offizielle Top 100)	13
Scottish Albums (OCC)	35
Swedish Albums (Sverigetopplistan)	24
Swiss Albums (Schweizer Hitparade)	81
UK Albums (OCC)	44
US Billboard 200	2
US Digital Albums (Billboard)	2
US Hard Rock Albums (Billboard)	1
US Independent Albums (Billboard)	1
US Tastemaker Albums (Billboard)	3
US Top Rock Albums (Billboard)	1

=== Year-end charts ===
Chart (2014)	Position
US Billboard 200	57
US Hard Rock Albums (Billboard)	1
US Independent Albums (Billboard)	4
US Top Rock Albums (Billboard)	9

== Certifications ==
Region	Certification	Certified units/sales
Canada (Music Canada)	Gold	40,000^{‡}
United States (RIAA)	Gold	500,000^{‡}
^{‡} Sales+streaming figures based on certification alone.

== Personnel ==
- Ivan Moody – vocals
- Zoltan Bathory – guitars
- Jason Hook – guitars
- Jeremy Spencer – drums
- Chris Kael – bass
- Ryan Clark – guest vocals on "Weight Beneath My Sin"
- Rob Zombie – guest vocals on "Burn MF"
- Andy James – guitar (credited only on the 10th anniversary)
- Charlie Engen – drums (credited only on the 10th anniversary)
- Kevin Churko – production
