= Inside Out (Five Finger Death Punch song) =

Single by Five Finger Death Punch

from the album F8
- Released: December 2, 2019
- Recorded: 2019
- Genre: Groove metal; alternative metal; symphonic metal
- Length: 3:46
- Label: Better Noise
- Songwriters: Zoltan Bathory; Kevin Churko; Ivan Moody; Jason Hook
- Producer: Kevin Churko

Five Finger Death Punch singles chronology
"Sham Pain" (2018)	"Inside Out" (2019)	"Living the Dream" (2020)

Music video
- "Inside Out on YouTube

"Inside Out" is a song by American heavy metal band Five Finger Death Punch, released as the lead single from their eighth studio album, F8. The song has a radio edited version (which features an extended intro and less intense vocals) and an official video for it as well. In February 2020, the song topped the Billboard Mainstream Rock Songs chart.

== Personnel ==
- Ivan Moody – vocals
- Zoltan Bathory – rhythm guitar
- Jason Hook – lead guitar
- Chris Kael – bass
- Charlie Engen – drums, percussion

== Charts ==
=== Weekly charts ===
Chart (2020)	Peak position
Canada Rock (Billboard)	48
US Hot Rock & Alternative Songs (Billboard)	3
US Rock & Alternative Airplay (Billboard)	12

=== Year-end charts ===
Chart (2020)	Position
US Hot Rock & Alternative Songs (Billboard)	44

== Certifications ==
Region	Certification	Certified units/sales
Canada (Music Canada)	Gold	40,000^{‡}
United States (RIAA)	Gold	500,000^{‡}
^{‡} Sales+streaming figures based on certification alone.
