= Daniel Kilgore =

Daniel Kilgore may refer to:

- Daniel Kilgore (American football) (born 1987), American football player
- Daniel Kilgore (politician) (1793–1851), United States representative from Ohio
- Daniel Kilgore (comics), the title character of the comic book series Haunt
