= Stranger than Fiction (Five Finger Death Punch song) =

Single by Five Finger Death Punch

from the album The Way of the Fist
- Released: September 17, 2008
- Genre: Groove metal; alternative metal
- Length: 3:20
- Label: Firm
- Songwriters: Zoltan Bathory; Ivan Moody

Five Finger Death Punch singles chronology
"Never Enough" (2008)	"Stranger than Fiction" (2008)	"Hard to See" (2009)

"Stranger than Fiction" is a song by American heavy metal band Five Finger Death Punch. It was included as one of the three bonus tracks on the re-release of their debut album, The Way of the Fist (2007). The song was released as the third single from the album on September 17, 2008.

== Track listing ==
Promo CD
No.	Title	Length
1.	"Stranger than Fiction"	3:20
Total length:		3:20

== Personnel ==
- Ivan Moody – vocals
- Darrell Roberts – guitars
- Zoltan Bathory – guitars
- Matt Snell – bass
- Jeremy Spencer – drums

== Charts ==
Chart (2008)	Peak position
US Mainstream Rock (Billboard)	16
