= The Creech =

Sci-Fi/Horror comic book series

Publication information
- Publisher: Image Comics
- First appearance: The Creech #1 (October 1997)
- Created by: Greg Capullo

The Creech is an American three-issue comic book series published by Image Comics in 1997, followed by a subsequent three issue series in 2001, The Creech: Out for Blood. The series was created by Greg Capullo.

The title character is an in vitro created life form that was made from hundreds of aborted fetuses by Dr. Pashu Battu, an engineer at The Agency. When Battu realizes The Agency intends to exploit The Creech as force for destruction, he sabotages the project and the creature is let loose on the city.

In 1998 the Creech character appeared in a line of Spawn action figures.
