= Battle Born (song) =

Single by Five Finger Death Punch

from the album The Wrong Side of Heaven and the Righteous Side of Hell, Volume 2
- Released: September 9, 2013
- Genre: Hard rock; heavy metal
- Length: 3:43
- Label: Prospect Park; Eleven Seven
- Songwriters: Zoltan Bathory; Kevin Churko; Ivan Moody; Jason Hook; Jeremy Spencer
- Producers: Kevin Churko; Five Finger Death Punch

Five Finger Death Punch singles chronology
"Lift Me Up" (2013)	"Battle Born" (2013)	"House of the Rising Sun" (2014)

Music video
- "Battle Born" on YouTube

"Battle Born" is a song by American heavy metal band Five Finger Death Punch. A ballad, it was released as the lead single from their fifth studio album, The Wrong Side of Heaven and the Righteous Side of Hell, Volume 2 (2013). The song went to radio on September 9, 2013, with the official music video being published on October 2, 2013.

== Premise ==
According to lead vocalist Ivan Moody, after 24 months of travelling what seemed to be every part of the world and shaking hands with a large number of people, that even though he was doing what he always dreamed of, that he was psychologically and physically depleted. Because he lost track of time, the flights, the hours on the tour bus and the concerts all seemed to blur together with his relatives and companions becoming a distant relic of the past. Moody concludes by stating that:

"Everything worth fighting for you will actually HAVE TO fight for. Every wish, every dream, every idea comes to existence only through blood, sweat, and sacrifice... we are all Battle Born".

== Reviews ==
Giving the song 5 stars out of 5, Artistdirect describes the composition as "their best slow song since "The Bleeding"".

== Personnel ==
- Ivan Moody – vocals
- Zoltan Bathory – guitars
- Jason Hook – guitars
- Chris Kael – bass
- Jeremy Spencer – drums

== Charts ==
=== Weekly charts ===
Weekly chart performance for "Battle Born"
Chart (2013–2014)	Peak position
Canada Rock (Billboard)	10
UK Rock & Metal (Official Charts)	39
US Hot Rock & Alternative Songs (Billboard)	27
US Rock & Alternative Airplay (Billboard)	14

=== Year-end charts ===
Year-end chart performance for "Battle Born"
Chart (2014)	Position
US Hot Rock & Alternative Songs (Billboard)	97
