= Darkness Settles In =

2021 song by Five Finger Death Punch

Single by Five Finger Death Punch

from the album F8
- Released: May 4, 2021
- Length: 4:41
- Label: Better Noise
- Songwriters: Ivan Moody; Zoltan Bathory; Jason Hook; Kevin Churko
- Producers: Churko; Five Finger Death Punch

Five Finger Death Punch singles chronology
"A Little Bit Off" (2020)	"Darkness Settles In" (2021)	"AfterLife" (2022)

Music video
- "Darkness Settles In" on YouTube

"Darkness Settles In" is a song by American heavy metal band Five Finger Death Punch. Released on May 4, 2021, it is the fourth single from their eighth studio album, F8. It was included in the soundtrack for the film The Retaliators and became the band's 11th number-one song on the Billboard Mainstream Rock Airplay chart.

== Background ==
Singer Ivan Moody said the song was inspired by a vivid REM sleep dream in which his grandmother appeared, after which he wrote the lyrics immediately. He added that the first verse of the album version is the voicemail he left for producer Kevin Churko. Moody said the song related to recovery, including what he described as "addict dreams".

== Composition and lyrics ==
Kerrang! called it a power ballad, while Loudwire described it as "somber" and said it had "undeniable hooks". Blabbermouth described it as a showcase for Moody's vocals, and Metal Hammer compared it to Metallica's cover of "Turn the Page", saying it had "serious Springsteen vibes".

Billboard wrote that the lyrics reflect Moody's struggles and convey insecurity, anger, and hopefulness. Guitarist Zoltan Bathory said the lyrics show abandonment and were vague enough to apply beyond alcoholism.

== Music video ==
In April 2021, the band filmed a music video for "Darkness Settles In". It shows the band performing in a candlelit setting alongside scenes from the film The Retaliators, including appearances by Michael Lombardi and other cast members. The video also served as a trailer for the film, whose soundtrack includes the song.

== Chart performance ==
The song reached No. 1 on the Billboard Mainstream Rock Airplay chart on July 3, 2021, becoming the band's 11th chart-topper there. It was also their seventh consecutive No. 1, tying them with Disturbed for the most consecutive No. 1s in the chart's history. At the time, this tied the band for the fourth-most leaders in the chart's history. It also reached No. 1 on the Mediabase Active Rock chart in June 2021, becoming the band's 12th career chart-topper there.

== Personnel ==
Credits adapted from Apple Music.

Five Finger Death Punch

- Ivan Moody – lead vocals, songwriter
- Zoltan Bathory – rhythm guitar, songwriter
- Charlie Engen – drums
- Chris Kael – bass guitar, background vocals
- Jason Hook – background vocals, lead guitar, songwriter

Additional credits

- Kevin Churko – songwriter, producer, mixing engineer
- Five Finger Death Punch – producer

== Charts ==
=== Weekly charts ===
Weekly chart performance for "Darkness Settles In"
Chart (2020–2021)	Peak position
Canada Rock (Billboard)	35
Finland (Suomen virallinen lista)	81
US Hot Rock & Alternative Songs (Billboard)	25
US Rock & Alternative Airplay (Billboard)	11
US Mainstream Rock Airplay (Billboard)	1

=== Year-end charts ===
Year-end chart performance for "Darkness Settles In"
Chart (2021)	Position
US Rock & Alternative Airplay (Billboard)	43
US Mainstream Rock Airplay (Billboard)	13

== Certifications ==
Region	Certification	Certified units/sales
United States (RIAA)	Gold	500,000^{‡}
^{‡} Sales+streaming figures based on certification alone.
