= Mama Said Knock You Out (song) =

1991 single by LL Cool J

Single by LL Cool J

from the album Mama Said Knock You Out
- Released: February 26, 1991
- Genre: Golden age hip-hop
- Length: 4:50 (album version)
- Label: Def Jam; Columbia
- Songwriters: James Todd Smith; Marlon Lu’Ree Williams; Bob Erwin; Leroy McCants; William Earl Collins; James McCants; George Clinton; Sylvester Stewart; Gregory Jacobs; Walter Morrison
- Producer: Marley Marl

LL Cool J singles chronology
| "Around the Way Girl" (1990) | "Mama Said Knock You Out" (1991) | "Rampage" (1991) |

Music video
- "Mama Said Knock You Out" on YouTube

"Mama Said Knock You Out" is a song by American rapper and actor LL Cool J, released in February 1991 by Def Jam and Columbia as the fourth single from his fourth studio album of the same name (1990). The song begins with the line, "Don't call it a comeback/I been here for years." Before "Mama Said Knock You Out" was released, many people felt that LL Cool J's career was waning; his grandmother, who still believed in his talent, told him to "knock out" all his critics. The song takes various shots at Kool Moe Dee. It was produced by Marley Marl with help from DJ Bobcat along with LL.

"Mama Said Knock You Out" reached the top twenty on the US Billboard Hot 100, peaking at number 17. The single also reached number 63 on the US Cash Box Top 100 and number-one on the Billboard Rap Singles chart. It was certified Platinum by the Recording Industry Association of America (RIAA) and won the Grammy Award for Best Rap Solo Performance. In October 2023, Billboard magazine ranked "Mama Said Knock You Out" among the "500 Best Pop Songs of All Time".

== Background ==
The song uses samples from James Brown's "Funky Drummer", the Chicago Gangsters' "Gangster Boogie", Sly & The Family Stone's "Trip to Your Heart", the drum break from Sly & the Family Stone's "Sing a Simple Song", and LL Cool J's own "Rock the Bells" (from his debut album Radio). The music video features LL Cool J in a boxing ring, rapping into the announcer's microphone. Intercut with this are clips of boxing matches and LL Cool J exercising.

LL Cool J said in his autobiography that the idea for the song came from a discussion with his grandmother. He had said to his grandmother that he felt that he could not survive as a rapper now that gangsta rap was popular and he was being dissed by several up-and-coming rappers. LL's grandmother responded, "Oh baby, just knock them out!" She is featured in the closing scene of the music video, saying "Todd! Todd! Get upstairs and take out that garbage."

== Critical reception ==
Jon Wilde from Melody Maker said in his review of the single, "It is rather gratifying to see this arrogant, obnoxious young feller struggling hopelessly to resurrect his career. The Roy Kinnear of the rap scene returns with more of the same bilious rubbish. Nice hat though." Another Melody Maker editor, Robin Bresnark, remarked, "Possibly the first mainstream rap track which, for me, had the vicious beats to fully match its rhetoric." David Quantick from NME wrote, "'Mama Said Knock You Out' demands that we 'don't call it a comeback'. I don't think we need go as far as that." NME editor Paolo Hewitt felt the track is "a vicious and exhilarating display of the man's talents." David Fricke from Rolling Stone remarked that the rapper "obliges big time with producer Marley Marl's steely, stripped-back beats and his own verbal fisticuffs" on "the super-slammin'" track.

== Legacy ==
Rolling Stone ranked the song 29th in a 2012 list of the "50 Greatest Hip Hop Songs of All Time". In October 2023, Billboard magazine ranked "Mama Said Knock You Out" number 406 in their list of the "500 Best Pop Songs of All Time".

Bob Dylan played it in Theme Time Radio Hour in 2006. He noted the song was "in the same tradition as the Dozens" and recited the first verse before playing it.

LL Cool J re-recorded a new version along with the Roots by mashing up with Here I Come to promote the NBA in-season tournament.

== Charts ==
| Chart (1990) | Peak position |
|---|---|
| UK Singles (Official Charts) | 41 |

| Chart (1991) | Peak position |
|---|---|
| Australia (ARIA) | 37 |
| New Zealand (Recorded Music NZ) | 47 |
| US Billboard Hot 100 | 17 |
| US Dance Club Songs (Billboard) | 7 |
| US Hot R&B/Hip-Hop Songs (Billboard) | 12 |
| US Rap Singles (Billboard) | 1 |
| US Cash Box Top 100 | 63 |

== Certifications ==
| Region | Certification | Certified units/sales |
|---|---|---|
| New Zealand (RMNZ) | Gold | 15,000^{‡} |
| United Kingdom (BPI) | Silver | 200,000^{‡} |
| United States (RIAA) | Platinum | 1,000,000^{‡} |
^{‡} Sales+streaming figures based on certification alone.

== Five Finger Death Punch version ==
"Mama Said Knock You Out"

Single by Five Finger Death Punch featuring Tech N9ne

from the album The Wrong Side of Heaven and the Righteous Side of Hell, Volume 1
- Released: March 25, 2014
- Recorded: 2012–13
- Genre: Rap metal
- Length: 2:48 (album version)
- Label: Prospect Park
- Songwriters: James Todd Smith; Marlon Williams; George Clinton; Gregory Jacobs; James Louis Mccants; Leroy Mccants; Sylvester Stewart; Walter Morrison; William Collins

Five Finger Death Punch singles chronology
| "House of the Rising Sun" (2014) | "Mama Said Knock You Out" (2014) | "Wrong Side of Heaven" (2014) |

American heavy metal band Five Finger Death Punch covered the song for their fourth studio album, The Wrong Side of Heaven and the Righteous Side of Hell, Volume 1. The cover features rapper Tech N9ne. The single was released on March 25, 2014 by Prospect Park Records.
