= F8 (album) =

Studio album by Five Finger Death Punch
- Released: February 28, 2020
- Recorded: May–October 2019
- Studio: The Hideout, Las Vegas
- Genre: Groove metal; alternative metal; nu metal
- Length: 45:06
- Label: Better Noise
- Producer: Kevin Churko

Five Finger Death Punch chronology
And Justice for None (2018)	F8 (2020)	A Decade of Destruction, Volume 2 (2020)

Singles from F8
- 1. "Inside Out" Released: December 2, 2019; 2. "Full Circle" Released: January 3, 2020; 3. "Living the Dream" Released: February 7, 2020; 4. "A Little Bit Off" Released: May 5, 2020; 5. "Darkness Settles In" Released: May 4, 2021

Professional ratings
Review scores
Source	Rating
AllMusic	3/5 stars
Blabbermouth.net	(7.5/10)
Kerrang!	3/5 stars
Metal Hammer	4/5 stars
Wall of Sound	(8.5/10)

F8 (pronounced "fate") is the eighth studio album by American heavy metal band Five Finger Death Punch, released on February 28, 2020. It is the first Five Finger Death Punch album to feature drummer Charlie Engen, who joined the band following the departure of founding drummer Jeremy Spencer, and final album with guitarist Jason Hook. F8 is also the band's first album to be released through Better Noise Music.

Written and recorded from May to October 2019, F8 is considered a "rebirth" of the band, according to guitarist Zoltan Bathory.

== Background ==
On May 9, 2019, the band released a video announcing a "new record in the making". On December 2, 2019, the band released the single, "Inside Out", announcing that their upcoming eighth studio album would be titled F8 and would be released on February 28, 2020. According to the band's lead vocalist Ivan Moody, when talking about lead single "Inside Out" he describes it as his own story about his addiction struggles. As for the record itself he called the record his pardon after what he's been through in terms of his addiction and of his friends that he lost during that time of struggles such as the late Linkin Park vocalist Chester Bennington.

== Track listing ==
All tracks written by Zoltan Bathory, Jason Hook, Ivan Moody and Kevin Churko

F8 track listing
No.	Title	Length
1.	"F8" (Intro)	1:15
2.	"Inside Out"	3:46
3.	"Full Circle"	3:22
4.	"Living the Dream"	3:35
5.	"A Little Bit Off"	3:11
6.	"Bottom of the Top"	3:30
7.	"To Be Alone"	3:45
8.	"Mother May I (Tic Toc)"	3:54
9.	"Darkness Settles In"	4:41
10.	"This Is War"	3:12
11.	"Leave It All Behind"	3:31
12.	"Scar Tissue"	2:53
13.	"Brighter Side of Grey"	4:30
Total length:		45:06

Bonus tracks
No.	Title	Length
14.	"Making Monsters"	3:03
15.	"Death Punch Therapy"	3:08
16.	"Inside Out (Radio Edit)"	4:13
Total length:		55:31

== Personnel ==
- Ivan Moody – lead vocals
- Zoltan Bathory – guitars
- Jason Hook – guitars
- Chris Kael – bass
- Charlie Engen – drums, percussion

== Charts ==
=== Weekly charts ===
Weekly chart performance for F8
Chart (2020)	Peak position
Australian Albums (ARIA)	2
Austrian Albums (Ö3 Austria)	2
Belgian Albums (Ultratop Flanders)	10
Belgian Albums (Ultratop Wallonia)	28
Canadian Albums (Billboard)	10
Czech Albums (ČNS IFPI)	28
Dutch Albums (Album Top 100)	21
Estonian Albums (Eesti Tipp-40)	23
Finnish Albums (Suomen virallinen lista)	1
French Albums (SNEP)	58
German Albums (Offizielle Top 100)	2
Hungarian Albums (MAHASZ)	8
Italian Albums (FIMI)	84
New Zealand Albums (RMNZ)	36
Norwegian Albums (VG-lista)	8
Polish Albums (ZPAV)	20
Scottish Albums (Official Charts)	3
Spanish Albums (Promusicae)	40
Swedish Albums (Sverigetopplistan)	9
Swiss Albums (Schweizer Hitparade)	4
UK Albums (Official Charts)	7
UK Rock & Metal Albums (OCC)	1
US Billboard 200	8
US Top Rock Albums (Billboard)	2

=== Year-end charts ===
Year-end chart performance for F8
Chart (2020)	Position
German Albums (Offizielle Top 100)	87
US Top Album Sales (Billboard)	63
US Top Current Album Sales (Billboard)	43
US Top Rock Albums (Billboard)	55
US Top Hard Rock Albums (Billboard)	18

== Certifications ==
Certifications for F8
Region	Certification	Certified units/sales
Canada (Music Canada)	Gold	40,000^{‡}
Norway (IFPI Norway)	Gold	10,000^{‡}
Sweden (GLF)	Gold	15,000^{‡}
United States (RIAA)	Gold	500,000^{‡}
^{‡} Sales+streaming figures based on certification alone.
