= The Wrong Side of Heaven and the Righteous Side of Hell, Volume 1 =

Studio album by Five Finger Death Punch
- Released: July 30, 2013
- Recorded: 2012–2013 at The Hideout Studios, Las Vegas, Nevada
- Genres: Groove metal; alternative metal; hard rock
- Length: 41:56
- Label: Prospect Park
- Producers: Kevin Churko; Five Finger Death Punch

Five Finger Death Punch chronology
American Capitalist (2011)	The Wrong Side of Heaven and the Righteous Side of Hell, Volume 1 (2013)	The Wrong Side of Heaven and the Righteous Side of Hell, Volume 2 (2013)

Singles from The Wrong Side of Heaven and the Righteous Side of Hell, Volume 1
- 1. "Lift Me Up" Released: May 2, 2013; 2. "Mama Said Knock You Out" Released: March 25, 2014; 3. "Wrong Side of Heaven" Released: August 10, 2014

Professional ratings
Review scores
Source	Rating
AllMusic	3.5/5 stars
Artistdirect	5/5 stars
Jukebox:Metal	5/5 stars
Loudwire	4/5 stars
Melodic	5/5 stars
Tapp Out Music	3/5 stars
Ultimate Guitar	3/5 stars

The Wrong Side of Heaven and the Righteous Side of Hell, Volume 1 (also known as The Wrong Side of Heaven and the Righteous Side of Hell or simply The Wrong Side of Heaven) is the fourth studio album by American heavy metal band Five Finger Death Punch and the first of two albums released by the band in 2013. It was released on July 30, 2013, through Prospect Park. Pre-orders for the album started on iTunes on June 18, 2013. The album debuted in the United States Billboard 200 charts at No. 2, their highest chart position in that country, with 113,000 copies sold. Volume 2 and Got Your Six would eventually tie this chart record. The album has been certified platinum by the Recording Industry Association of America (RIAA) for sales of at least 1,000,000 copies. The album was entirely produced by Kevin Churko and Five Finger Death Punch.

== Background ==
On February 15, 2013, Five Finger Death Punch announced that they were working on their fourth album. On March 18, the band posted a promotional video for an upcoming tour with a new song titled "Here to Die". The song would end up appearing on The Wrong Side of Heaven and the Righteous Side of Hell, Volume 2 as the first track.

On May 1, 2013, the band announced that they would be releasing two studio albums in the year, with The Wrong Side of Heaven and the Righteous Side of Hell, Volume 1 being released on July 30, and Volume 2 following later in the year. Guitarist Zoltan Bathory said of the band's decision to release two albums:

"We came off the road after a couple of great years of touring and were really amped up to write the 4th record. Everybody was in the right headspace and the band tighter than ever so it was a perfect storm. We jumped in head first and found ourselves 12–13 songs deep fairly quick but were still coming up with better and better material so we looked at each other and said... okay why stop there?... let’s keep going. Once we passed the 24th song we knew we’re going to have to do a double album. We had this massive amount of music that’s very dear to us, possibly the best material this band has ever created. At that point there was no way to decide which songs to leave off the album. So we made the decision to release them all."

Unlike the sequel to the album, Volume 1 features multiple guest appearances, including Rob Halford, Tech N9ne, and Maria Brink. The deluxe version includes Max Cavalera and Jamey Jasta in addition to those already mentioned.

== Singles ==
The album's opening track and lead single is "Lift Me Up", and features Judas Priest lead singer Rob Halford. The band debuted the song live during the 5th Annual Golden God Awards. It was subsequently released as a single on May 2, 2013. Lead singer Ivan Moody remarked that "just to work alongside an icon like Rob Halford, The Metal God, was absolutely surreal." Moody has said of the song's lyrical themes: "The song itself was originally written about overcoming everyday obstacles and less-than-perfect situations. Most of us weren't born with a silver spoon in our mouth, but if life dealt you all the wrong cards, you still have to play."

The album's second single, an LL Cool J cover of "Mama Said Knock You Out", was released on March 25, 2014. It features American rapper Tech N9ne.

The album's third single was the title track serving for both albums, "Wrong Side of Heaven".

== Track listing ==
All tracks are written by Five Finger Death Punch and Kevin Churko, except where noted.

No.	Title	Length
1.	"Lift Me Up" (featuring Rob Halford of Judas Priest)	4:06
2.	"Watch You Bleed"	3:43
3.	"You"	3:03
4.	"Wrong Side of Heaven"	4:31
5.	"Burn MF"	3:37
6.	"I.M.Sin"	3:39
7.	"Anywhere But Here" (featuring Maria Brink of In This Moment)	3:45
8.	"Dot Your Eyes"	3:15
9.	"M.I.N.E (End This Way)"	4:06
10.	"Mama Said Knock You Out" (featuring Tech N9ne, LL Cool J cover)	2:47
11.	"Diary of a Deadman"	4:44

Bonus tracks
No.	Title	Length
12.	"I.M.Sin" (featuring Max Cavalera of Soulfly)	3:39
13.	"Anywhere But Here" (duet with Maria Brink of In This Moment)	3:46
14.	"Dot Your Eyes" (featuring Jamey Jasta of Hatebreed)	3:15
Total length:		52:08

10th Anniversary bonus track
No.	Title	Length
15.	"Burn MF" (featuring Rob Zombie)	3:37

Disc two: Purgatory (Tales from the Pit) (live album)
No.	Title	Length
1.	"Intro"	1:00
2.	"Under and Over It"	4:09
3.	"Burn It Down"	4:07
4.	"American Capitalist"	3:33
5.	"Hard to See"	3:45
6.	"Coming Down"	5:07
7.	"Bad Company"	4:57
8.	"White Knuckles"	10:00
9.	"Drum Solo"	4:16
10.	"Far from Home"	2:29
11.	"Never Enough"	3:42
12.	"War Is the Answer"	5:44
13.	"Remember Everything"	5:14
14.	"No One Gets Left Behind"	3:49
15.	"The Bleeding"	7:16
Total length:		69:08

== Charts ==
Chart (2013)	Peak position
Australian Albums (ARIA)	13
Austrian Albums (Ö3 Austria)	5
Canadian Albums (Billboard)	3
Finnish Albums (Suomen virallinen lista)	7
German Albums Chart (Offizielle Top 100)	4
New Zealand Albums (RMNZ)	26
Scottish Albums (Official Charts)	16
Swedish Albums (Sverigetopplistan)	14
Swiss Albums (Schweizer Hitparade)	34
UK Albums (Official Charts)	21
US Billboard 200	2
US Top Rock Albums (Billboard)	1
US Hard Rock Albums (Billboard)	1
US Digital Albums (Billboard)	2
US Independent Albums (Billboard)	1
US Tastemaker Albums (Billboard)	2

=== Year-end charts ===
Chart (2013)	Position
US Billboard 200	91
US Hard Rock Albums (Billboard)	4
US Independent Albums (Billboard)	8
US Top Rock Albums (Billboard)	21

Chart (2014)	Position
US Billboard 200	186
US Hard Rock Albums (Billboard)	7
US Independent Albums (Billboard)	12
US Top Rock Albums (Billboard)	34

== Certifications ==
Region	Certification	Certified units/sales
Canada (Music Canada)	Gold	40,000^{^}
New Zealand (RMNZ)	Gold	7,500^{‡}
United Kingdom (BPI)	Gold	100,000^{‡}
United States (RIAA)	Platinum	1,000,000^{‡}
^{^} Shipments figures based on certification alone.^{‡} Sales+streaming figures based on certification alone.

== Personnel ==
Band

- Ivan Moody – vocals
- Zoltan Bathory – guitars
- Jason Hook – guitars
- Jeremy Spencer – drums
- Chris Kael – bass
- Andy James – guitars (credited only on the 10th anniversary)
- Charlie Engen – drums (credited only on the 10th anniversary)

Additional personnel

- Kevin Churko – producer
- Rob Halford – additional vocals on "Lift Me Up"
- Tech N9ne – additional vocals on "Mama Said Knock You Out"
- Max Cavalera – additional vocals on "I.M.Sin"
- Maria Brink – additional vocals on "Anywhere But Here"
- Jamey Jasta – additional vocals on "Dot Your Eyes"
- Rob Zombie – additional vocals on "Burn MF"
