= Got Your Six =

Studio album by Five Finger Death Punch
- Released: September 4, 2015
- Recorded: 2015
- Genres: Groove metal; alternative metal; hard rock
- Length: 38:23 (standard edition); 48:23 (deluxe edition)
- Label: Prospect Park
- Producers: Kevin Churko; Five Finger Death Punch

Five Finger Death Punch chronology
The Wrong Side of Heaven and the Righteous Side of Hell, Volume 2 (2013)	Got Your Six (2015)	A Decade of Destruction (2017)

Singles from Got Your Six
- 1. "Jekyll and Hyde" Released: June 15, 2015; 2. "Wash It All Away" Released: October 2015; 3. "My Nemesis" Released: February 28, 2016; 4. "I Apologize (appears on the deluxe edition)" Released: July 22, 2016

Got Your Six is the sixth studio album by American heavy metal band Five Finger Death Punch. It was released on September 4, 2015, by Prospect Park. Got Your Six sold 119,000 units to debut at number two on the Billboard 200. The 114,000 in pure album sales made it the top-selling album of the week and the band's best sales week to date. Got Your Six is also their third consecutive set to debut at number two.

== Background ==
In January 2015, the band announced they were recording a new album due later in 2015.

On May 2, 2015, they released the title of the new album as Got Your Six. On May 19, 2015, they released the art work for their new album and announced that the album will be released on August 28, 2015. They launched a preview for their new single titled "Jekyll and Hyde" in a special video message. They also announced the dates of a co-headlining North American Tour with Papa Roach and accompanied by In This Moment as special guests with support from From Ashes to New for the tour, during which they will promote the album. The release date was later moved back a week to September 4, 2015.

Drummer Jeremy Spencer said of the new album in an interview, "I'm digging it, man. It's actually more brutal, with more extreme dynamics. There are some really mellow parts and then some really brutal parts. So we're running the whole gamut of sounds.".

== Reception ==
Professional ratings
Review scores
Source	Rating
AllMusic	2/5 stars
The Guardian	4/5 stars
Metal Hammer	4/5 stars
Sputnikmusic	1/5
Ultimate Guitar	6/10 stars

Selling 119,000 units in its first week, Got Your Six debuted at number two on the September 26, 2015, survey of the Billboard 200, and number one on the Top Rock Albums survey of the same date. Of the 119,000 units sold in its first week, 114,000 of them were pure album sales, making it the best-selling album of the week. It also became the band's best-selling album in terms of first-week sales, surpassing the 112,000 first-week sales of The Wrong Side of Heaven and the Righteous Side of Hell, Volume 1. It was certified Platinum by the RIAA on January 19, 2024; and has sold more than 390,000 pure albums as of September 13, 2016.

The album was included at number 44 on Rock Sound's top 50 releases of 2015.

== Track listing ==
Standard edition Every track is written by Zoltan Bathory, Ivan Moody, Jeremy Spencer, Jason Hook and Kevin Churko
No.	Title	Length
1.	"Got Your Six"	2:58
2.	"Jekyll and Hyde"	3:26
3.	"Wash It All Away"	3:45
4.	"Ain't My Last Dance"	3:29
5.	"My Nemesis"	3:35
6.	"No Sudden Movement"	3:21
7.	"Question Everything"	5:05
8.	"Hell to Pay"	3:07
9.	"Digging My Own Grave"	3:47
10.	"Meet My Maker"	3:00
11.	"Boots and Blood"	2:45
Total length:		38:23

Deluxe edition
No.	Title	Length
12.	"You're Not My Kind"	3:21
13.	"This Is My War"	2:55
14.	"I Apologize"	4:03
Total length:		48:23

Standard CD and deluxe CD
No.	Title	Length
15.	"Jekyll and Hyde" (voicemail) (hidden track)	2:01
Total length:		50:21

== Personnel ==
Band

- Ivan Moody – lead vocals
- Zoltan Bathory – guitars
- Jason Hook – guitars
- Chris Kael – bass
- Jeremy Spencer – drums

Production

- Kevin Churko – production

== Charts ==
=== Weekly charts ===
Chart (2015)	Peak position
Australian Albums (ARIA)	3
Austrian Albums (Ö3 Austria)	5
Belgian Albums (Ultratop Flanders)	29
Belgian Albums (Ultratop Wallonia)	38
Canadian Albums (Billboard)	3
Danish Albums (Hitlisten)	14
Dutch Albums (Album Top 100)	17
Finnish Albums (Suomen virallinen lista)	3
French Albums (SNEP)	40
German Albums (Offizielle Top 100)	5
Hungarian Albums (MAHASZ)	20
Irish Albums (IRMA)	46
New Zealand Albums (RMNZ)	14
Norwegian Albums (VG-lista)	9
Scottish Albums (Official Charts)	6
Swedish Albums (Sverigetopplistan)	5
Swiss Albums (Schweizer Hitparade)	5
UK Albums (Official Charts)	6
UK Rock & Metal Albums (Official Charts)	2
US Billboard 200	2
US Top Hard Rock Albums (Billboard)	1
US Top Rock Albums (Billboard)	1

=== Year-end charts ===
Chart (2015)	Position
US Billboard 200	133
US Top Hard Rock Albums (Billboard)	5
US Top Rock Albums (Billboard)	15

Chart (2016)	Position
Swedish Albums (Sverigetopplistan)	80
US Billboard 200	140
US Top Hard Rock Albums (Billboard)	2
US Top Rock Albums (Billboard)	12

=== Singles ===
Title	Year	Peak chart positions		
Title	Year	US	US Main. Rock	US Rock
"Jekyll and Hyde"	2015	123	3	14
"Wash It All Away"	2015	—	1	19
"My Nemesis"	2016	—	2	34
"Hell to Pay"	2016	—	—	—
"I Apologize"	2016	—	4	29
"—" denotes a recording that did not chart or was not released in that territory.

== Certifications ==
Region	Certification	Certified units/sales
Canada (Music Canada)	Gold	40,000^{‡}
Denmark (IFPI Danmark)	Gold	10,000^{‡}
Germany (BVMI)	Gold	100,000^{‡}
New Zealand (RMNZ)	Gold	7,500^{‡}
United Kingdom (BPI)	Silver	60,000^{‡}
United States (RIAA)	Platinum	1,000,000^{‡}
^{‡} Sales+streaming figures based on certification alone.
