= Living the Dream (Five Finger Death Punch song) =

2020 song by Five Finger Death Punch

Single by Five Finger Death Punch

from the album F8
- Released: February 7, 2020
- Length: 3:34
- Label: Better Noise
- Songwriters: Ivan Moody; Zoltan Bathory; Jason Hook; Kevin Churko
- Producers: Churko; Five Finger Death Punch

Five Finger Death Punch singles chronology
"Inside Out" (2019)	"Living the Dream" (2020)	"A Little Bit Off" (2020)

Music video
- "Living the Dream" on YouTube

"Living the Dream" is a song by American heavy metal band Five Finger Death Punch. Released on February 7, 2020, it is the third single from their eighth studio album, F8. It became the band's tenth number-one song on the Billboard Mainstream Rock Airplay chart.

== Background and release ==
On February 7, 2020, the band released the song alongside a lyric video as a preview of their upcoming album F8. It followed the earlier singles "Inside Out" and "Full Circle".

== Composition and lyrics ==
Loudwire wrote that singer Ivan Moody reflects on the costs of fame and the music industry. The lyrics reference several fictional superheroes, including Captain America, Superman, and Iron Man, as well as the title Mr. Universe. MetalSucks noted that the lyrics include the phrases "Your Majesty" and "Lady Amnesty", and suggested that the latter may refer to Lady Liberty.

In reviews of F8, Kerrang! said "Living the Dream" has a heavy guitar riff and catchy hooks. Loudwire described the guitar riffs as "buzzsaw" and a streamlined chorus in which the singer asks whether the band is "just part of the machine". Wall of Sound AU wrote that the lyrics suggest that neither superheroes nor amnesty can save people from themselves or the judgment of others. Metal Hammer described the song as "more stadium rock-sounding" than the preceding track on the album, "Full Circle".

== Music video ==
In September 2020, the band filmed a music video for the song in Los Angeles. Guitarist Zoltan Bathory shared photos from the set on September 10, 2020, captioned "On the set shooting 'Living the Dream'". In October 2020, the band released the music video, which Kerrang! described as "rife with symbolism and implicit social commentary". Bathory said the video reflected his view that the idea of America was under siege. He described the situation as "not a 'left against right' problem but an evolutionary problem". He also said that artists "have a unique opportunity to portray and ridicule the absurd to prevent it from becoming reality". Released during the COVID-19 pandemic and the 2020 U.S. presidential election, the video was described by Loudwire as politically charged.

The video begins with a quote from Ralph Waldo Emerson: "Fiction reveals truth that reality obscures". It shows a female political figure praising mask-wearers, zombies hoarding toilet paper, and a work camp labeled "People's Republic of America". Later, an uprising occurs as people remove their masks and carry American flags. It includes a brief reference to QAnon and The Great Awakening, as well as leashed, masked, black-clothed figures that The Music interpreted as referring to Antifa or BLM. It also shows imagery including an aging Captain America snorting cocaine, and a man receiving a hammer and sickle badge labeled "compliant" for wearing a face mask. The symbol later appears on prison uniforms issued by "People's Republic of America". The narrative ends with an uprising against the woman, after which the events are revealed to be a nightmare experienced by George Washington while signing the Constitution.

The video was criticized by MetalSucks, which described it as promoting an anti-mask message. It drew backlash over scenes in which people wearing face masks receive "compliant" badges featuring the hammer-and-sickle symbols. Bathory later said the video was not intended as an anti-mask statement, adding that the mask scenes were metaphorical and showed the difference between rules for the public and those who were exempt. Moody later said he disagreed with the video and that it was not what he had in mind when he wrote the song. He also said the video caused tension between himself and Bathory, adding that Bathory had control over its concept, while he only participated in filming for two days.

== Track listing ==
"Living the Dream" – by Five Finger Death Punch single
No.	Title	Length
1.	"Living The Dream" (Explicit)	3:34

== Accolades ==
It was nominated for Rock Song of the Year at the 2022 iHeartRadio Music Awards.

== Chart performance ==
It reached No. 1 on the Billboard Mainstream Rock Airplay chart dated February 6, 2021, becoming the band's tenth song to top the chart and making them one of eight acts with at least ten leaders on the tally. The song was also their sixth consecutive No. 1 and third single from F8 to reach the top.

== Personnel ==
Credits adapted from Apple Music.

Five Finger Death Punch

- Ivan Moody – lead vocals, songwriter
- Zoltan Bathory – rhythm guitar, songwriter
- Charlie Engen – drums
- Chris Kael – bass guitar, background vocals
- Jason Hook – background vocals, lead guitar, songwriter

Additional credits

- Kevin Churko – songwriter, producer, mixing engineer
- Five Finger Death Punch – producer

== Charts ==
=== Weekly charts ===
Weekly chart performance for "Living the Dream"
Chart (2020–2021)	Peak position
Canada Rock (Billboard)	47
Czech Republic Rock (IFPI)	17
Finland (Suomen virallinen lista)	49
US Hot Rock & Alternative Songs (Billboard)	18
US Rock & Alternative Airplay (Billboard)	12
US Mainstream Rock Airplay (Billboard)	1

=== Year-end charts ===
Year-end chart performance for "Living the Dream"
Chart (2021)	Position
US Mainstream Rock Airplay (Billboard)	12
