= Walk Away (Five Finger Death Punch song) =

Single by Five Finger Death Punch

from the album War Is the Answer
- Released: November 2, 2009
- Recorded: 2009
- Genre: Hard rock
- Length: 3:42
- Label: Prospect Park
- Songwriters: Zoltan Bathory; Ivan Moody; Jason Hook; Jeremy Spencer; Matt Snell
- Producer: Kevin Churko

Five Finger Death Punch singles chronology
"Hard to See" (2009)	"Walk Away" (2009)	"Dying Breed" (2009)

Lyric video
- "Walk Away" on YouTube

"Walk Away" is a song by American heavy metal band Five Finger Death Punch. It was released as the second single from their second studio album, War Is the Answer (2009), on November 2, 2009. The song peaked at No. 7 on Billboard's Mainstream Rock chart (the band's fourth top-10 on that chart), at No. 31 on the Alternative Songs chart and at No. 21 on the Rock Songs chart (their second appearance in the latter charts), making it their second highest-charted single to date. It was used as the official theme song for the 2010 TNA Lockdown PPV.

== Writing ==
About the conception of the song, guitarist Zoltan Bathory told Metal Hammer, "You know, it's rare to come up with a song that is so complete, and I don't say that with any sense of ego. As far as I'm concerned, I'm not really the writer of the song, I'm just the vehicle for the music, but I'm really delighted to have channelled something like this – a number with the potential to touch people's lives in a powerful way, and that's an ancient and a primal thing, and actually quite a tough thing to do…"

He further added, "I think the song is pretty forceful from just a musical point of view, but when you add in the vocals and the lyrics, it takes things to a whole new plane. Ivan is dealing with relationship issues in the lyrics, and he's certainly loaded with ammo on that subject, you can tell he's singing straight from the heart… Sometimes in life, the stars all align and a bit of magic is created, and I certainly think that's the case here…"

== Track listing ==
Promo CD
No.	Title	Length
1.	"Walk Away"	3:42

== Personnel ==
- Ivan Moody – vocals
- Jason Hook – guitars
- Zoltan Bathory – guitars
- Matt Snell – bass
- Jeremy Spencer – drums

== Charts ==
Chart (2010)	Peak position
US Hot Rock & Alternative Songs (Billboard)	21
US Alternative Airplay (Billboard)	31
US Mainstream Rock (Billboard)	7
