= A Little Bit Off =

2020 single by Five Finger Death Punch

Single by Five Finger Death Punch

from the album F8
- Released: June 8, 2020
- Recorded: 2019
- Genre: Alternative rock
- Length: 3:11
- Label: Better Noise
- Songwriters: Zoltan Bathory; Kevin Churko; Ivan Moody; Jason Hook
- Producer: Kevin Churko

Five Finger Death Punch singles chronology
"Living the Dream" (2020)	"A Little Bit Off" (2020)	"Darkness Settles In" (2021)

Music video
- "A Little Bit Off" on YouTube

"A Little Bit Off" is a song by American heavy metal band Five Finger Death Punch. It was their second single off of their eighth studio album, F8. It topped the Billboard Mainstream Rock Songs chart in June 2020.

== Background ==
The song was released as the second single from the band's eighth studio album, F8. A music video was released on June 8, 2020. The video is self-referential to the struggles they encountered to make the music video; their record label was urging them to record a music video for the song, which was already climbing up the rock music charts, but production issues kept occurring due to the COVID-19 pandemic. The video documents how support staff was limited and many things in production had to be cut. In the end, the video is relatively minimalist, featuring guitarist Zoltan Bathory and bassist Chris Kael dressed up as an angel and demon playing chess, and frontman Ivan Moody singing in a deserted Las Vegas Strip backdrop in the middle of the day.

In June 2020, the song topped the Billboard Mainstream Rock Songs, making it the band's ninth song to do so. In addition to being one of the bands with the most chart toppers for the long-running chart, the song was also one of the first to top Billboard's newly created Hot Hard Rock Songs chart and is their highest charting song on the Rock and Alternative Airplay chart, peaking at #3.

== Themes and composition ==
"A Little Bit Off" is an alternative rock song driven by an acoustic guitar riff. Lyrically, the song has been described as about frontman Ivan Moody's "laundry list of little anxieties" and his previous struggles related to mental health and alcohol addiction.

== Reception ==
Loudwire named it one of the best rock songs of 2020, praising its emotional lyrics for being "open and honest" about mental health.

== Personnel ==
- Ivan Moody – lead vocals
- Zoltan Bathory – rhythm guitar
- Jason Hook – lead guitar, backing vocals
- Chris Kael – bass, backing vocals
- Charlie Engen – drums, percussion

== Charts ==
=== Weekly charts ===
Chart (2020)	Peak position
Canada Rock (Billboard)	22
Czech Republic Airplay (ČNS IFPI)	6
US Hot Rock & Alternative Songs (Billboard)	8
US Rock & Alternative Airplay (Billboard)	3

=== Year-end charts ===
Chart (2020)	Position
US Hot Rock & Alternative Songs (Billboard)	42
US Rock Airplay (Billboard)	28

== Certifications ==
Region	Certification	Certified units/sales
Canada (Music Canada)	Platinum	80,000^{‡}
United States (RIAA)	2× Platinum	2,000,000^{‡}
^{‡} Sales+streaming figures based on certification alone.
