= When the Seasons Change =

2018 song by Five Finger Death Punch

Single by Five Finger Death Punch

from the album And Justice for None
- Released: May 4, 2018
- Length: 3:47
- Label: Prospect Park; Eleven Seven
- Songwriters: Ivan Moody; Kevin Churko; Jason Hook; Zoltan Bathory; Jeremy Spencer
- Producers: Five Finger Death Punch; Churko

Five Finger Death Punch singles chronology
"Sham Pain" (2018)	"When the Seasons Change" (2018)	"Blue on Black" (2019)

Music video
- "When the Seasons Change" on YouTube

"When the Seasons Change" is a single by American heavy metal band Five Finger Death Punch. Released on May 4, 2018, it is the third single from their seventh studio album, And Justice for None. It is the band's sixth number-one hit on Billboard's Mainstream Rock Songs chart.

== Background ==
According to guitarist Zoltan Bathory, the song is about loyalty that endures in the face of adversity, which he said the band has faced many times throughout their career and in their lives, adding that it is a subject everyone can relate to.

== Composition ==
The song has been called a power ballad which Loudwire said shows a lighter side of the band. Sputnikmusic similarly described the song as a mainstream ballad and noted it as one of the highlights of the album. In a review of the album, Blabbermouth grouped it with other tracks the reviewer described as "breezy pop rocks".

== Reception ==
In a review of the album, Distorted Sound Magazine described the song as having "raw power" and praised the singing performance of vocalist Ivan Moody, while Metal Hammer noted the song as one of the album's power ballads. Loudwire listed the song among the best rock songs of 2018 so far, noting Moody's more introspective vocal performance.

== Music video ==
A music video was released in September 2018 and was dedicated to police officers and other first responders, including Charleston Hartfield, a US Army veteran and police officer who died while protecting others during the 2017 Las Vegas shooting at the Route 91 Harvest festival. The video, written by Bathory, depicts two police officers responding to a crime and coming under fire.

== Track listing ==
"When the Seasons Change" – by Five Finger Death Punch single
No.	Title	Length
1.	"When the Seasons Change"	3:47

== Chart performance ==
It reached No. 1 on the Billboard Mainstream Rock Airplay chart on March 2, 2019, their sixth song to do so. It is their second consecutive chart-topper, and tying them for the third-most No. 1's on the chart in the 2010s.

== Personnel ==
Credits adapted from Apple Music.

Five Finger Death Punch

- Ivan Moody – lead vocals, songwriter
- Zoltan Bathory – rhythm guitar, acoustic guitar, songwriter
- Jason Hook – electric guitar, background vocals, lead guitar, songwriter
- Jeremy Spencer – drums, percussion, songwriter
- Chris Kael – bass guitar, background vocals

Additional credits

- Kevin Churko – songwriter, producer, mixing engineer, recording engineer, mastering engineer
- Five Finger Death Punch – producer

== Charts ==
=== Weekly charts ===
Weekly chart performance for "When the Seasons Change"
Chart (2018–2019)	Peak position
Canada Rock (Billboard)	36
US Hot Rock & Alternative Songs (Billboard)	17
US Rock & Alternative Airplay (Billboard)	18
US Mainstream Rock Airplay (Billboard)	1

=== Year-end charts ===
Year-end chart performance for "When the Seasons Change"
Chart (2019)	Position
US Mainstream Rock Airplay (Billboard)	12
