= My Nemesis =

Single by Five Finger Death Punch

from the album Got Your Six
- Released: 28 February 2016
- Genre: Alternative metal
- Length: 3:35
- Label: Prospect Park
- Songwriters: Zoltan Bathory; Kevin Churko; Ivan Moody; Jason Hook; Jeremy Spencer
- Producer: Kevin Churko

Five Finger Death Punch singles chronology
"Wash It All Away" (2015)	"My Nemesis" (2016)	"I Apologize" (2016)

Music video
- "My Nemesis" on YouTube

"My Nemesis" is a song by American heavy metal band Five Finger Death Punch, from their sixth studio album Got Your Six. It was released on 28 February 2016 as the third single from the album. There is also an official video of the song as well.

== Charts ==
Chart (2016)	Peak position
US Hot Rock & Alternative Songs (Billboard)	34
US Rock & Alternative Airplay (Billboard)	17
