= And Justice for None =

Studio album by Five Finger Death Punch
- Released: May 18, 2018
- Recorded: 2016
- Genres: Groove metal; nu metal; alternative metal; hard rock
- Length: 47:15 (standard edition); 57:48 (deluxe edition)
- Label: Prospect Park
- Producers: Kevin Churko; Five Finger Death Punch

Five Finger Death Punch chronology
A Decade of Destruction (2017)	And Justice for None (2018)	F8 (2020)

Singles from And Justice for None
- 1. "Fake" Released: April 5, 2018; 2. "Sham Pain" Released: April 20, 2018; 3. "When the Seasons Change" Released: May 3, 2018; 4. "Blue on Black" Released: April 12, 2019

Alternative album cover
- Deluxe edition

And Justice for None is the seventh studio album by American heavy metal band Five Finger Death Punch. It was released on May 18, 2018, and was preceded by two singles released in December 2017 on their first greatest hits record. It is the last studio album to be released through Prospect Park and last album to feature founding drummer Jeremy Spencer, who departed the band in December 2018.

== Background ==
The band had already completed recording of the album by December 31, 2016. However, due to ongoing problems with their label Prospect Park, the album was delayed until 2018 after they reached negotiations with the label. After negotiations were reached in late 2017, they released the greatest hits compilation A Decade of Destruction and two new songs entitled "Trouble" and a cover of The Offspring song "Gone Away" recorded for the new album, were included on the compilation, with "Trouble" being featured on the deluxe version of the new album, which also features a different album cover than the standard edition.

With the standard edition having a runtime of 47 minutes and 15 seconds, And Justice for None is the longest Five Finger Death Punch album to date.

== Reception ==
Professional ratings
Aggregate scores
Source	Rating
Metacritic	55/100
Review scores
Source	Rating
Blabbermouth.net	6.5/10
Classic Rock	3.5/5 stars
Distorted Sound	4/5 stars
The Guardian	3/5 stars
Metal Hammer	3.5/5 stars
Rolling Stone	2/5 stars
Sputnikmusic	1.5/5

At the 2019 Bandit Rock Awards ceremony, And Justice for None won Best International Album.

According to the review aggregator Metacritic, And Justice for None received "mixed or average reviews" based on a weighted average score of 55 out of 100 from 4 critic scores.

== Track listing ==
Standard edition
No.	Title	Length
1.	"Fake"	3:30
2.	"Top of the World"	2:42
3.	"Sham Pain"	3:29
4.	"Blue on Black" (Kenny Wayne Shepherd cover)	4:34
5.	"Fire in the Hole"	2:56
6.	"I Refuse"	3:38
7.	"It Doesn't Matter"	3:45
8.	"When the Seasons Change"	3:47
9.	"Stuck in My Ways"	3:56
10.	"Rock Bottom"	2:31
11.	"Gone Away" (The Offspring cover, originally from A Decade of Destruction)	4:35
12.	"Bloody"	3:49
13.	"Will the Sun Ever Rise"	3:56
Total length:		47:15

Deluxe edition
No.	Title	Length
1.	"Trouble" (bonus track, originally from A Decade of Destruction)	3:12
2.	"Fake"	3:30
3.	"Top of the World"	2:42
4.	"Sham Pain"	3:29
5.	"Blue on Black" (Kenny Wayne Shepherd cover)	4:34
6.	"Fire in the Hole"	2:56
7.	"I Refuse"	3:38
8.	"It Doesn't Matter"	3:45
9.	"When the Seasons Change"	3:47
10.	"Stuck in My Ways"	3:56
11.	"Rock Bottom"	2:31
12.	"Gone Away" (The Offspring cover, originally appeared on A Decade of Destruction)	4:35
13.	"Bloody"	3:49
14.	"Will the Sun Ever Rise"	3:56
15.	"Bad Seed" (bonus track)	3:59
16.	"Save Your Breath" (bonus track)	3:27
Total length:		57:48

== Personnel ==
- Ivan Moody – vocals
- Zoltan Bathory – guitars
- Jason Hook – guitars
- Jeremy Spencer – drums
- Chris Kael – bass

== Charts ==
=== Weekly charts ===
Chart (2018)	Peak position
Australian Albums (ARIA)	4
Austrian Albums (Ö3 Austria)	1
Belgian Albums (Ultratop Flanders)	12
Belgian Albums (Ultratop Wallonia)	26
Canadian Albums (Billboard)	4
Danish Albums (Hitlisten)	6
Dutch Albums (Album Top 100)	19
Finnish Albums (Suomen virallinen lista)	2
French Albums (SNEP)	31
German Albums (Offizielle Top 100)	1
Hungarian Albums (MAHASZ)	24
Irish Albums (IRMA)	84
Italian Albums (FIMI)	54
Japanese Albums (Oricon)	82
New Zealand Albums (RMNZ)	12
Norwegian Albums (VG-lista)	3
Scottish Albums (Official Charts)	6
Spanish Albums (PROMUSICAE)	95
Swedish Albums (Sverigetopplistan)	4
Swiss Albums (Schweizer Hitparade)	1
UK Albums (Official Charts)	7
UK Rock & Metal Albums (OCC)	1
US Billboard 200	4
US Top Hard Rock Albums (Billboard)	1
US Top Rock Albums (Billboard)	1

=== Year-end charts ===
Chart (2018)	Position
German Albums (Offizielle Top 100)	72
US Billboard 200	167
US Top Rock Albums (Billboard)	28

== Certifications ==
Region	Certification	Certified units/sales
Sweden (GLF)	Gold	15,000^{‡}
United States (RIAA)	Gold	500,000^{‡}
^{‡} Sales+streaming figures based on certification alone.
