= Jekyll and Hyde (song) =

Single by Five Finger Death Punch

from the album Got Your Six
- Released: June 15, 2015
- Recorded: 2015
- Genre: Groove metal; alternative metal
- Length: 3:26
- Label: Prospect Park
- Songwriters: Zoltan Bathory; Kevin Churko; Ivan Moody; Jason Hook; Jeremy Spencer
- Producer: Kevin Churko

Five Finger Death Punch singles chronology
"Wrong Side of Heaven" (2014)	"Jekyll and Hyde" (2015)	"Wash It All Away" (2015)

Music video
- "Jekyll and Hyde" on YouTube

"Jekyll and Hyde" is a song by American heavy metal band Five Finger Death Punch from their sixth studio album, Got Your Six. It is the first single from the album, and is the twentieth single overall from the band, which was released on June 15, 2015.

== Composition and theme ==
The song formed from a voice mail left at 2:30AM by lead vocalist Ivan Moody to guitarist Jason Hook. Hook made the voice mail into a song, which was well received by the other members of the band.

== Release ==
On June 15, 2015, the song was premiered via MonsterEnergy.com in addition to rock radio stations around the country. The song is part of a video created to promote their tour in late 2015 with Papa Roach, In This Moment and From Ashes to New. The music video and song are playable in the video game Guitar Hero Live.

== Music video ==
A music video was made and uploaded to YouTube on June 29, 2015. It begins with a prologue giving the background of the music video itself, indirectly explaining stylistic choices made for the video. The band is talking to someone over the phone (it is not specified who or what he does, but it can be assumed he is from the band's record label) before a concert. They are talking about a music video which the band does not want to do and the voice claims "[you've] been promising it to us for a while and it's just not happening," to which Moody replies "We just don't do music videos anymore." Zoltan Bathory asks if they have to be in the music video, and the voice tells them yes, "...preferably dressed looking like Five Finger Death Punch." The call ends, and the band begins trying to come up with ideas for the music video. Spencer and Kael agree that they want to break stuff, and the band decides that they're going to make it completely ridiculous and silly instead of serious. In the music video portion, the members are in different rooms doing various things in ridiculous outfits. Moody is watching a movie in a Napoleon Dynamite T-shirt and Minion pajama pants, Hook is playing guitar on a couch wearing goggles and a jumpsuit, Spencer is sitting at a table with a coffee machine in a football jersey and helmet (though he is lacking in pants wearing Superman underwear instead), Bathory is loading and shooting guns into the air wearing a "We the People" Guy Fawkes mask t-shirt and slippers shaped like bear paws, and Kael is knitting a baby sock. Towards the end, some of the members begin breaking things (Moody smashes a TV with a baseball, Spencer headbutts the coffee machine with his football helmet, Hook smashed a glass table with his guitar, Kael flips a table and saws it with a chainsaw). The video ends with Bathory and Spencer talking after the concert, and Bathory says "My joy in this is giving it to the [record] label and watching the horrific looks on their faces," and Spencer agrees.

== Charts ==
=== Weekly charts ===
Weekly chart performance for "Jekyll and Hyde"
Chart (2015)	Peak position
US Bubbling Under Hot 100 (Billboard)	23
US Hot Rock & Alternative Songs (Billboard)	12
US Rock & Alternative Airplay (Billboard)	17

=== Year-end charts ===
Year-end chart performance for "Jekyll and Hyde"
Chart (2015)	Position
US Hot Rock Songs (Billboard)	29

== Certifications ==
Certifications for "Jekyll and Hyde"
Region	Certification	Certified units/sales
New Zealand (RMNZ)	Platinum	30,000^{‡}
United Kingdom (BPI)	Silver	200,000^{‡}
United States (RIAA)	Platinum	1,000,000^{‡}
^{‡} Sales+streaming figures based on certification alone.
