= War Is the Answer =

Studio album by Five Finger Death Punch
- Released: September 22, 2009
- Recorded: April–June 2009
- Studio: Gump Punch Studios (Las Vegas)
- Genres: Groove metal; alternative metal; hard rock
- Length: 45:17
- Labels: Prospect Park; Spinefarm
- Producer: Kevin Churko

Five Finger Death Punch chronology
The Way of the Fist (2007)	War Is the Answer (2009)	American Capitalist (2011)

Singles from War Is the Answer
- 1. "Hard to See" Released: July 21, 2009; 2. "Walk Away" Released: November 2, 2009; 3. "Dying Breed" Released: November 16, 2009; 4. "No One Gets Left Behind" Released: March 8, 2010; 5. "Bad Company" Released: May 17, 2010; 6. "Far from Home" Released: September 16, 2010

Professional ratings
Review scores
Source	Rating
AllMusic	3.5/5 stars
Decade	7.6/10
Jukebox:Metal	4/5 stars
Kerrang!	4/5 stars
Rock Sound	6/10 stars

War Is the Answer is the second studio album by American heavy metal band Five Finger Death Punch. It was released on September 22, 2009, through Prospect Park. The album debuted at number seven on the Billboard 200, selling approximately 44,000 copies in its first week. It is the band's last album to feature bassist Matt Snell, who departed in late 2010, and the first with Jason Hook. War Is the Answer has been certified platinum in the U.S., with sales of 1,000,000.

== Writing and recording ==
War Is the Answer was announced as Five Finger Death Punch's second studio album in May 2009. The album was produced by Kevin Churko, who had previously produced Ozzy Osbourne's Black Rain, and mixed by Randy Staub, who had previously worked with Metallica, Nickelback, and Stone Sour. Guitarist Zoltan Bathory, commenting on the style of the album, stated "we've continued the journey we started on the first album, so there's a healthy balance of melody and aggression, and as always we concentrated on writing strong metal songs in the traditional sense."

Bathory said to Metal Hammer about the album title:

"It's a phrase we've had up our sleeve for some time, and I've been talking about it a lot in interviews. In fact, somebody just said to me: 'If war is the answer, then what is the question?', and I guess the answer to that is 'life'! Basically, you're fighting against something or other right from the start – fighting for survival with pretty much everything against you, and there are occasions when the only really appropriate response is to punch someone in the mouth! It's a pretty involved subject once you really start to think about it, and this record covers it all – the deeper meaning and of course the more shallow one too!"

== Singles ==
Six singles were released from the album: "Hard to See", "Walk Away", "Dying Breed", "No One Gets Left Behind", "Bad Company", and "Far from Home". "Hard to See" began receiving radio play on July 13, 2009. The song was noted for having "undeniable melodies". According to Bathory, the song is about people being attached to opinions based on limited amounts of information. It is also a playable track in the video game Guitar Hero: Warriors of Rock.

The second single, "Walk Away", was released on November 2, 2009, and appeared in Tap Tap Revenge 3 as one of their weekly free tracks and also was used as the theme song for TNA's 2010 PPV Lockdown. The next two singles, "Dying Breed", released on November 16, 2009, and "No One Gets Left Behind", released on March 8, 2010, were both released exclusively in the UK.

The band released their cover of Bad Company's song "Bad Company" as the fifth single on May 17, 2010. "Far from Home" was released as the sixth single on September 16, 2010. "Far from Home" was also featured as the incidental music over the closing scenes of the TV drama show Criminal Minds episode "What Happens at Home".

== Release ==
Although War Is the Answer was originally announced to be released on June 8, 2009, this was put back to October 6, 2009, then brought forward to September 22, 2009. On August 10, 2009, they announced the first leg of their Shock and Raw Tour, which will promote the new album. The second leg was announced on August 17, 2009.

"Bad Company" was originally only played live. One of Jeremy's friends told him Five Finger Death Punch should record "Bad Company" and release it on their next album, War Is the Answer. "Bad Company" was originally going to be a bonus track, but ended up making the standard edition of the album and became one of Five Finger Death Punch's biggest songs.

The two bonus tracks, "Succubus" and "Undone", were originally cut from their first album The Way of the Fist. A demo version of "Succubus" was leaked onto the Internet under the title "Hate Me". The band decided to re-record both songs and include them as bonus tracks on War Is the Answer. According to Jeremy Spencer's book Death Punch'd, Jeremy was drunk while editing "Succubus" and forgot to save the original edit.

"Never Enough" was going to be on War Is the Answer but was then released as a bonus track on both the re-release and "The "Iron Fist" edition" of The Way of the Fist due to the band wanting to release the song before War Is the Answer.

== Track listing ==
All tracks are written by Five Finger Death Punch, except where noted.

Standard edition
No.	Title	Length
1.	"Dying Breed"	2:56
2.	"Hard to See"	3:28
3.	"Bulletproof"	3:15
4.	"No One Gets Left Behind"	3:23
5.	"Crossing Over"	2:54
6.	"Burn It Down"	3:33
7.	"Far from Home"	3:32
8.	"Falling in Hate"	3:00
9.	"My Own Hell"	3:34
10.	"Walk Away"	3:42
11.	"Canto 34" (instrumental)	4:09
12.	"Bad Company" (Bad Company cover)	4:22
13.	"War Is the Answer"	3:18
Total length:		45:17

iTunes bonus track
No.	Title	Length
14.	"Walk Away" (live)	3:40
Total length:		48:57

Deluxe edition bonus tracks
No.	Title	Length
14.	"Succubus"	3:09
15.	"Undone"	3:44
Total length:		55:50

== Personnel ==
Five Finger Death Punch

- Ivan Moody – vocals
- Zoltan Bathory – guitars
- Jason Hook – guitars
- Matt Snell – bass
- Jeremy Spencer – drums
- Darrell Roberts – writing credit on "Bulletproof"

Production

- Kevin Churko – producer
- Randy Staub – mixing

Imagery

- Sxv'leithan Essex and Zoltan Bathory – art direction and design
- Alyson Blanchard – live photo
- Nathan Gallagher – military photos

== Charts ==
=== Weekly charts ===
Weekly chart performance for War Is the Answer
Chart (2009)	Peak position
Finnish Albums (Suomen virallinen lista)	14
US Billboard 200	7
US Top Hard Rock Albums (Billboard)	3
US Independent Albums (Billboard)	5
US Top Rock Albums (Billboard)	4

=== Year-end charts ===
2010 year-end chart performance for War Is the Answer
Chart (2010)	Position
US Billboard 200	152
US Top Rock Albums (Billboard)	39

2011 year-end chart performance for War Is the Answer
Chart (2011)	Position
US Billboard 200	179
US Top Rock Albums (Billboard)	44

== Certifications ==
Certifications for War Is the Answer
Region	Certification	Certified units/sales
Canada (Music Canada)	Gold	40,000^{^}
United Kingdom (BPI)	Silver	60,000^{‡}
United States (RIAA)	Platinum	1,000,000^{‡}
^{^} Shipments figures based on certification alone.^{‡} Sales+streaming figures based on certification alone.
