= Lift Me Up (Five Finger Death Punch song) =

Single by Five Finger Death Punch featuring Rob Halford

from the album The Wrong Side of Heaven and the Righteous Side of Hell, Volume 1
- Released: May 2, 2013
- Genre: Groove metal
- Length: 4:06
- Label: Prospect Park
- Songwriters: Zoltan Bathory; Kevin Churko; Ivan Moody; Jason Hook; Jeremy Spencer

Five Finger Death Punch singles chronology
"The Pride" (2012)	"Lift Me Up" (2013)	"Battle Born" (2013)

Lyric video
- "Lift Me Up" on YouTube

"Lift Me Up" is the first single and opening track from The Wrong Side of Heaven and the Righteous Side of Hell, Volume 1, the fourth studio album from Five Finger Death Punch, and is the fifteenth single overall from the band. The song features Rob Halford, lead vocalist for Judas Priest. Halford joined the band at the Revolver Golden Gods Awards on May 2, 2013, to premiere the tune, with lead singer Ivan Moody referring to himself as being "the guest (vocalist)" on the song.

The song was number one in the Internet music app Spotify in its first week of release over pop songs from Mariah Carey, Daft Punk, Fergie, and others. The list represents the most viral tracks on Spotify based on the number of people who shared it divided by the number who listened to it from Monday, May 13, to Sunday, May 19, via Facebook, Tumblr, Twitter and Spotify.

In April 2014, the song won a Revolver Golden Gods Award for "Song of the Year."

== Meaning ==
According to Moody, the composition was about overcoming routine roadblocks and less-than-ideal circumstances in life. He then goes on to say that while most of us weren't born into wealth, if life deals you a bad hand, you still have to play with the cards that life deals you. Moody closes by stating that the song is intended to inspire and that if you play your hand right, you might still come out on top.

== Video ==
The song begins with Moody singing the first verse along with the chorus, followed by Halford singing the second verse and the two of them singing the final refrain. The current lyric video features dark skies, lightning as well as microorganisms attacking one another.

== Personnel ==
- Zoltan Bathory – rhythm guitar
- Jason Hook – lead guitar, backing vocals (original version)
- Ivan Moody – lead vocals
- Chris Kael – bass, backing vocals
- Jeremy Spencer – drums (original version)
- Rob Halford – guest vocals (original version)
- Andy James - lead guitar (re-recorded version)
- Charlie Engen - drums (re-recorded version)

== Charts ==
=== Weekly charts ===
Weekly chart performance for "Lift Me Up"
Chart (2013)	Peak position
Canada Hot 100 (Billboard)	100
US Hot Rock & Alternative Songs (Billboard)	19
US Rock & Alternative Airplay (Billboard)	18

=== Year-end charts ===
Year-end chart performance for "Lift Me Up"
Chart (2013)	Position
US Hot Rock Songs (Billboard)	48
US Rock Airplay (Billboard)	46
