= Wash It All Away (song) =

Single by Five Finger Death Punch

from the album Got Your Six
- Released: October 2015
- Genre: Alternative metal
- Length: 3:45
- Label: Prospect Park
- Songwriters: Zoltan Bathory; Kevin Churko; Ivan Moody; Jason Hook; Jeremy Spencer
- Producer: Kevin Churko

Five Finger Death Punch singles chronology
"Jekyll and Hyde" (2015)	"Wash It All Away" (2015)	"My Nemesis" (2016)

Music video
- "Wash It All Away" on YouTube

"Wash It All Away" is a song by American heavy metal band Five Finger Death Punch, from their sixth studio album Got Your Six. It was released in October 2015 as the second single from the album.

== Charts ==
=== Weekly charts ===
Weekly chart performance for "Wash It All Away"
Chart (2016)	Peak position
Czech Republic Rock (IFPI)	4
Finland (Suomen virallinen lista)	41
US Hot Rock & Alternative Songs (Billboard)	19
US Rock & Alternative Airplay (Billboard)	15

=== Year-end charts ===
Year-end chart performance for "Wash It All Away"
Chart (2016)	Position
US Hot Rock Songs (Billboard)	56

== Certifications ==
Region	Certification	Certified units/sales
Denmark (IFPI Danmark)	Gold	45,000^{‡}
New Zealand (RMNZ)	Gold	15,000^{‡}
United States (RIAA)	Platinum	1,000,000^{‡}
^{‡} Sales+streaming figures based on certification alone.
