= Wrong Side of Heaven =

Single by Five Finger Death Punch

from the album The Wrong Side of Heaven and the Righteous Side of Hell, Volume 1
- Released: August 11, 2014
- Genre: Alternative metal
- Length: 4:31
- Label: Prospect Park
- Songwriters: Zoltan Bathory; Kevin Churko; Ivan Moody; Jason Hook; Jeremy Spencer
- Producer: Kevin Churko

Five Finger Death Punch singles chronology
"Mama Said Knock You Out" (2014)	"Wrong Side of Heaven" (2014)	"Jekyll and Hyde" (2015)

Music video
- "Wrong Side of Heaven" on YouTube

"Wrong Side of Heaven" is a single by American heavy metal band Five Finger Death Punch from their fourth studio album, The Wrong Side of Heaven and the Righteous Side of Hell, Volume 1. It is the third single from the album, and is the nineteenth single overall from the band, which was released on August 11, 2014.

== Background ==
To add to the contributions made by the band through their numerous military concerts, the ensemble wanted to create a music video in order to assist vagrant veterans of the armed forces by publicly portraying the consequences of post-traumatic stress disorder on wounded warriors. Additionally, the group created a "No One Gets Left Behind" jersey to be funded via an Indiegogo crowd funding campaign to assist the organizations mentioned in the video. They also requested that the family and friends of deceased military veterans provide dog tags to assist in the preparation of a memorial wall to accompany the band in late 2014. It is proposed that the wall eventually will be placed in a museum to honor those who served.

== Music video ==
The video, directed by Nick Peterson, increases visibility on the suffering of vagrant veterans of the armed forces and the consequences of post-traumatic stress disorder.

== Track listing ==
Promo CD
No.	Title	Length
1.	"Wrong Side of Heaven"

== Charts ==
=== Weekly charts ===
Weekly chart performance for "Wrong Side of Heaven"
Chart (2014–2015)	Peak position
US Bubbling Under Hot 100 (Billboard)	12
US Hot Rock & Alternative Songs (Billboard)	11
US Rock & Alternative Airplay (Billboard)	12

=== Year-end charts ===
2014 year-end chart performance for "Wrong Side of Heaven"
Chart (2014)	Position
US Hot Rock & Alternative Songs (Billboard)	77

2015 year-end chart performance for "Wrong Side of Heaven"
Chart (2015)	Position
US Hot Rock Songs (Billboard)	87

== Certifications ==
Certifications for "Wrong Side of Heaven"
Region	Certification	Certified units/sales
Denmark (IFPI Danmark)	Gold	45,000^{‡}
New Zealand (RMNZ)	Platinum	30,000^{‡}
United Kingdom (BPI)	Silver	200,000^{‡}
^{‡} Sales+streaming figures based on certification alone.
