= Sham Pain =

2018 single by Five Finger Death Punch

Single by Five Finger Death Punch

from the album And Justice for None
- Released: April 20, 2018
- Recorded: 2016–2017
- Genre: Alternative metal; rap rock
- Length: 3:29
- Label: Prospect Park
- Producers: Kevin Churko; Five Finger Death Punch

Five Finger Death Punch singles chronology
"Fake" (2018)	"Sham Pain" (2018)	"When the Seasons Change" (2018)

Music video
- "Sham Pain" on YouTube

"Sham Pain" is a song by American heavy metal band Five Finger Death Punch. Released on April 20, 2018, it is the second single from their seventh studio album, And Justice for None. It is the band's sixth number-one hit on rock radio, and fifth number-one on Billboard's Mainstream Rock Songs chart. A music video, directed by Rob Anderson, was released on May 10, 2018.

== Music video ==
The music video for "Sham Pain" was based heavily on slapstick elements. "Life is not so difficult if you don’t take yourself sooo seriously. As long as you can find the humour in everything you are winning and the winning is strong with this video," guitarist Zoltan Bathory said of the video and song concept. He elaborated on this thought process for the video: "It was a simple process: we lit the set on fire and then made our poor director Rob Anderson’s artistic sense into a piñata. Whatever he could salvage became the music video."

The actions that occur throughout the video mostly have a direct tie to the lyrics of the song. During the verses, Ivan Moody is seen being the target of various inconveniences, as well as committing actions that follow the song's lyrics. For example, when as the song begins "I never cared about the money, never really needed fame", Moody is burning what appears to be dollar bills on a grill outside his trailer, and when the line "Everybody seems like they're waiting for me to die" is recited, Moody is shown being mauled by a bear, and then in another scene is struck by a meteorite. However, the chorus, which lyrically emphasizes that life is still good despite its inconveniences, shows Moody partying inside his trailer with several women and a few police officers, who had earlier ticketed him, perhaps because he had illegally parked his trailer. These video portrayals of the lyrics continue similarly in the second verse, where the band is signing autographs on Five Finger Death Punch memorabilia at a "meet-and-greet" event. Their tour bus breaks down in a desert in the next scene, and the band decide to hitchhike by the end of the next chorus.

During the guitar solo, the band members are stranded and Jason Hook, Jeremy Spencer and Chris Kael are busking for gas money. It is apparent that the band have obtained a vehicle to use; however, the band find another police officer in the process of impounding the car, wrapping it in caution tape with numerous tickets being placed on it, even though they presumably had been unable to move it due to a fuel situation. The band take selfies with the officer in hopes of convincing him to let it go, but are unable to do so. The officer gives the band the horns as they walk away, but Moody gives him the finger. As the final chorus comes in, the band are shown arriving in their earlier hitchhiked ride at a food truck in a desert location, and begin to have a makeshift party as the song draws to a close.

== Chart performance ==
=== Weekly charts ===
Chart (2018)	Peak position
Canada Rock (Billboard)	38
Sweden Heatseeker (Sverigetopplistan)	3
US Hot Rock & Alternative Songs (Billboard)	14
US Rock & Alternative Airplay (Billboard)	22

=== Year-end charts ===
Chart (2018)	Position
US Hot Rock Songs (Billboard)	26
