= The Way of the Fist =

Studio album by Five Finger Death Punch
- Released: July 31, 2007
- Recorded: 2006–2007
- Studios: Next Level Studios and Complex Studios in Los Angeles
- Genres: Groove metal; metalcore
- Length: 38:58; 49:26 (re-release)
- Labels: Firm; Spinefarm; Prospect Park
- Producers: Zoltan Bathory; Jeremy Spencer

Five Finger Death Punch chronology
The Way of the Fist (2007)	War Is the Answer (2009)

Singles from The Way of the Fist
- 1. "The Bleeding" Released: July 10, 2007; 2. "Never Enough (appears on the 2008 re-release)" Released: July 15, 2008; 3. "Stranger than Fiction (appears on the 2008 re-release)" Released: September 17, 2008

Alternative covers
- "Iron Fist" edition

Professional ratings
Review scores
Source	Rating
About.com	3.5/5 stars
Blabbermouth.net	3/10
Kerrang!	4/5 stars

The Way of the Fist is the debut studio album by American heavy metal band Five Finger Death Punch, released on July 31, 2007. The album sold 3,800 copies in its first week of release. The Way of the Fist made its Billboard 200 debut on August 18, 2007, at No. 199 and peaked at No. 107. It has been certified Gold for selling in excess of 500,000 copies as of April 13, 2011. This is the band's only release with guitarist Darrell Roberts.

== Recording and release ==
The band entered Next Level Studios and Complex Studios in Los Angeles to record The Way of the Fist. It was recorded with Stevo "Shotgun" Bruno (Mötley Crüe, Prong) and Mike Sarkisyan (Spineshank) and was mixed by former Machine Head and Soulfly guitarist Logan Mader. Shortly after, the band signed a deal with Firm Music, a branch of "The Firm". The album was released on July 31, 2007, selling 5,400 copies in its first week of release to debut at No. 199 on the Billboard 200 chart and peaked at No. 107. It sold an additional 1,400 copies in digital downloads its first week of release.

== Reissues ==
=== 2008 reissue ===
On May 13, 2008, The Way of the Fist was re-released. The re-release contained three new bonus tracks, "Never Enough", "Stranger than Fiction", and an acoustic version of "The Bleeding". The three songs could also be obtained on the band's website by anyone who had purchased a copy of the original release of the album.

=== "Iron Fist" edition ===
On November 22, 2010, the album was reissued again as a deluxe box set entitled The Way of The Fist: Iron Fist Edition. This version features new artwork, a documentary DVD, The Legend of The Fist Vol. 1, music videos for "The Bleeding", "Never Enough" and "The Way of the Fist", a bonus CD with 11 B-sides and rarities, trading cards, and an exclusive poster and calendar. One of the tracks on disc two, the Faith No More cover "From Out of Nowhere", was originally played live. They later recorded it and released it on the second disc.

=== 15th anniversary re-recorded version ===
Five Finger Death Punch are planning on re-recording The Way of the Fist along with their ninth studio album being recorded. With their ninth studio album AfterLife having released on August 19, 2022, the re-recorded version of The Way of the Fist was supposed to debut in 2024, but it missed the release.

== Track listing ==
Standard edition
No.	Title	Writer(s)	Length
1.	"Ashes"	Bathory; Moody	3:44
2.	"The Way of the Fist"	Bathory; Moody	3:58
3.	"Salvation"	Bathory; Moody; Snell; Spencer	3:20
4.	"The Bleeding"	Bathory; Moody	4:28
5.	"A Place to Die"	Bathory; Moody	3:40
6.	"The Devil's Own"	Bathory; Moody; Snell; Spencer	4:12
7.	"White Knuckles"	Bathory; Moody; Snell; Spencer; Roberts	4:10
8.	"Can't Heal You"	Bathory; Moody; Snell; Spencer	3:03
9.	"Death Before Dishonor"	Bathory; Moody; Spencer	3:54
10.	"Meet the Monster"	Bathory; Moody; Snell; Spencer	4:22
Total length:			38:58

2008 re-issue bonus tracks and disc one of "Iron Fist" edition
No.	Title	Length
11.	"Never Enough"	3:29
12.	"Stranger than Fiction"	3:20
13.	"The Bleeding" (acoustic)	3:37
Total length:		49:26

Disc two of "Iron Fist" edition
No.	Title	Writer(s)	Length
1.	"A New Level" (Pantera cover)	Pantera	4:00
2.	"From Out of Nowhere" (Faith No More cover)	Mike Patton	3:24
3.	"Succubus (Hate Me)" (Demo)		3:09
4.	"Salvation" (live)		3:45
5.	"The Way of the Fist" (live)		4:32
6.	"White Knuckles" (live)		6:16
7.	"Salvation" (instrumental)		3:22
8.	"The Bleeding" (instrumental)		4:30
9.	"The Way of the Fist" (instrumental)		4:02
10.	"The Devil's Own" (instrumental)		4:15
11.	"Never Enough" (instrumental)		3:30
Total length:			44:43

Disc three of "Iron Fist" edition
No.	Title	Length
1.	"The Legend of the Fist: Volume 1" (Documentary)	49:50
2.	"The Bleeding" (Music Video)	3:55
3.	"Never Enough" (Music Video)	3:29
4.	"The Way of the Fist" (Music Video)	4:10
Total length:		61:24

UK edition, 2016 UK vinyl and 2019 US vinyl
No.	Title	Length
1.	"Ashes"	3:44
2.	"The Way of the Fist"	3:58
3.	"Salvation"	3:20
4.	"The Bleeding"	4:28
5.	"A Place to Die"	3:40
6.	"The Devil's Own"	4:12
7.	"White Knuckles"	4:09
8.	"Never Enough"	3:29
9.	"Stranger than Fiction"	3:20
10.	"Can't Heal You"	3:03
11.	"Death Before Dishonor"	3:54
12.	"Meet the Monster"	4:22
Total length:		45:46

UK extended edition and reprinted on the 2018 US re-release
No.	Title	Writer(s)	Length
1.	"Ashes"		3:44
2.	"The Way of the Fist"		3:58
3.	"Salvation"		3:20
4.	"The Bleeding"		4:28
5.	"A Place to Die"		3:40
6.	"The Devil's Own"		4:12
7.	"White Knuckles"		4:09
8.	"Never Enough"		3:29
9.	"Stranger than Fiction"		3:20
10.	"Can't Heal You"		3:03
11.	"Death Before Dishonor"		3:54
12.	"Meet the Monster"		4:22
13.	"From Out of Nowhere" (Faith No More cover)	Mike Patton	3:23
14.	"The Devil's Own" (live)		4:56
Total length:			53:58

Canadian version
No.	Title	Length
1.	"Ashes"	3:44
2.	"The Way of the Fist"	3:58
3.	"Salvation"	3:20
4.	"The Bleeding"	4:28
5.	"A Place to Die"	3:40
6.	"The Devil's Own"	4:12
7.	"White Knuckles"	4:09
8.	"Can't Heal You"	3:03
9.	"Death Before Dishonor"	3:54
10.	"Meet the Monster"	4:22
11.	"Never Enough"	3:29
12.	"Stranger than Fiction"	3:20
13.	"The Bleeding" (Acoustic)	3:36
14.	"The Devil's Own" (Live)	4:54
Total length:		53:58

Japanese edition
No.	Title	Length
1.	"Ashes"	3:44
2.	"The Way of the Fist"	3:59
3.	"Salvation"	3:20
4.	"The Bleeding"	4:28
5.	"A Place to Die"	3:40
6.	"The Devil's Own"	4:12
7.	"White Knuckles"	4:09
8.	"Never Enough"	3:29
9.	"Stranger than Fiction"	3:20
10.	"Can't Heal You"	3:03
11.	"Death Before Dishonor"	3:54
12.	"Meet the Monster"	4:22
13.	"The Bleeding" (Acoustic)	3:36
14.	"Never Enough" (Music Video)	3:29
15.	"The Way of the Fist" (Music Video)	4:10
16.	"The Bleeding" (Music Video)	3:55

== Singles ==
Three singles were released from the album, "The Bleeding", "Never Enough", and "Stranger than Fiction".

Year	Title	Peak chart positions
Year	Title	US Main.
2007	"The Bleeding"	9
2008	"Never Enough"	9
2008	"Stranger than Fiction"	16

== Charts ==
Chart (2007)	Peak position
Finnish Albums Chart	28
US Billboard 200	107
US Billboard Heat Seekers	1

== Certifications ==
Region	Certification	Certified units/sales
Canada (Music Canada)	Gold	50,000^{^}
United States (RIAA)	Gold	500,000^{^}
^{^} Shipments figures based on certification alone.

== Personnel ==
Five Finger Death Punch

- Ivan Moody – lead vocals
- Zoltan Bathory – guitars
- Darrell Roberts – guitars (original version)
- Jason Hook – guitars (credited on the Iron Fist edition only)
- Matt Snell – bass, backing vocals (original version)
- Jeremy Spencer – drums (original version)
- Chris Kael – bass (re-recorded version)
- Charlie Engen – drums (re-recorded version)
- Andy James – guitars (re-recorded version)

Additional musicians

- Uros Raskovski – guitar solo on "The Bleeding"

Production

- Zoltan Bathory and Jeremy Spencer – production (original version)
- Logan Mader – mixing and mastering (original version)
- Stevo "Shotgun" Bruno – engineering (original version)
- Mike Sarkisyan – engineering (original version)
- George Alayon – engineering (original version)
- Sxv'Leithan Essex – artwork
- Kevin Churko – production, audio mixing, audio mastering, and engineering (re-recorded version)
