= Hard to See =

Single by Five Finger Death Punch

from the album War Is the Answer
- Released: July 9, 2009
- Genre: Groove metal
- Length: 3:30
- Label: Prospect Park
- Songwriters: Zoltan Bathory; Ivan Moody; Jason Hook; Jeremy Spencer; Matt Snell
- Producer: Kevin Churko

Five Finger Death Punch singles chronology
"Stranger than Fiction" (2008)	"Hard to See" (2009)	"Walk Away" (2009)

Music video
- "Hard to See" on YouTube

"Hard to See" is a song by American heavy metal band Five Finger Death Punch. The song was released as the first single from their second studio album War Is the Answer, and their fourth single overall. The single was released on July 21, 2009.

It is their fourth-highest charting single to date, peaking at No. 8on the Mainstream Rock chart. It is the band's third top-ten single. It also reached No. 28 on the Billboard Rock Songs chart and No. 40 on the Alternative Songs chart, their first appearance on either chart.

== Background ==
The song is about people being too attached to opinions they've formed on limited amounts of information. Guitarist Zoltan Bathory explained: "It's about seemingly irresolvable differences. It's valid in just about any setting: politics, religion, relationships… Everything is 'only an opinion' based on limited information, yet people sometimes get attached to their point of views to the extreme… in fact, to the point they would launch wars over them."

It began streaming on July 9, 2009, through Revolver's website. The song began to receive radio airplay on July 13, 2009.

The music video for the song premiered on August 28, 2009.

The song is available for download for the Rock Band series through the Rock Band Network. The song appeared as an on-disc track in Guitar Hero: Warriors of Rock. It was also in the soundtrack for the video game MLB 2K11. The song has been used in multiple NASCAR Racing 2003 Season crash videos on YouTube.

== Track listing ==
=== CD single ===
No.	Title	Length
1.	"Hard to See"	3:30

=== UK 7-inch ===
No.	Title	Length
1.	"Hard to See"	3:30
2.	"Bulletproof"	3:16

=== DJ edition ===
No.	Title	Length
1.	"Hard to See"	3:30
2.	"Bad Company"	4:22

== Personnel ==
- Ivan Moody – vocals
- Jason Hook – lead guitar, backing vocals
- Zoltan Bathory – rhythm guitar
- Matt Snell – bass, backing vocals
- Jeremy Spencer – drums
