= Never Enough (Five Finger Death Punch song) =

Single by Five Finger Death Punch

from the album The Way of the Fist
- Released: July 15, 2008
- Genre: Groove metal
- Length: 3:30
- Label: Firm
- Songwriters: Zoltan Bathory; Ivan Moody; Leopold Ross

Five Finger Death Punch singles chronology
"The Bleeding" (2007)	"Never Enough" (2008)	"Stranger than Fiction" (2008)

Music video
- "Never Enough" on YouTube

"Never Enough" is a song by American heavy metal band Five Finger Death Punch. It was included as a bonus track on the re-release of their debut album, The Way of the Fist. It was also made available on the band's website to anyone who had purchased the a copy of the original release of the album. It was released as the second single from The Way of the Fist on July 15, 2008. The song peaked at No. 9 on the Billboard Mainstream Rock Tracks chart.

== Music video ==
A video was directed by Agata Alexander.

The video begins showing a black-haired woman with a heavily tattooed man in what seems to be some sort of bondage fetish. The man then leaves in a white car and kisses the woman goodbye. The car is shown stopped somewhere, and a young man gets into the car revealing a handgun. A black Mercedes is shown, and the driver buys drugs from an unknown person (seemingly heroin, as the Mercedes driver is seen torching a spoon with a lighter). The white car is shown pulling up to a gas station, and the two men don ski masks and rob the store. A police car approaches the black Mercedes with its lights on, and the man gets nervous until the cop car quickly drives past him. The man then drives to the gas station held up by the other two men earlier, and the police car that passed the Mercedes is already there. The man approaches the crime scene/caution tape and is stopped by the police, but the man reveals his own badge. A chalk outline is shown on the ground outside the store, but it is not shown who was killed. The woman with the black hair from the beginning of the video is shown looking into a mirror and removing a wig, revealing her natural blonde hair. The young man who brought the gun to the robbery is shown looking depressed on his bed, holding said gun. The man with the badge from the Mercedes puts his badge in a desk drawer and is shown also looking bothered/depressed, and has a picture of the young gunman (his son) on his desk. The video ends showing all three of the characters (woman, young man and cop) eating dinner together; the adulterous wife, the murdering son and the druggie cop are all family, and all seem to wear a facade of everything being normal and ok. The video ends with a family picture being burned.

== Track listing ==
UK digital download single
No.	Title	Length
1.	"Never Enough"	3:29
2.	"Never Enough" (video)	3:38
3.	"The Way of the Fist" (video)	4:17
4.	"The Bleeding" (Highgate Vampire edition video)	4:00

US promo CD
No.	Title	Length
1.	"Never Enough (clean edit)"	3:29
2.	"Never Enough (album version)"	3:29
3.	"Never Enough (instrumental)"	3:29

Finland promo CD
No.	Title	Length
1.	"Never Enough"	3:29

== Personnel ==
- Ivan Moody – vocals
- Darrell Roberts – guitars, backing vocals (original recordings)
- Zoltan Bathory – guitars
- Matt Snell – bass, backing vocals (original recordings)
- Jeremy Spencer – drums (original recording)
- Andy James - guitars (re-recorded version)
- Chris Kael - bass, backing vocals (re-recorded version)
- Charlie Engen - drums (re-recorded version)

== Charts ==
=== Weekly charts ===
Weekly chart performance for "Never Enough"
Chart (2008)	Peak position
US Mainstream Rock (Billboard)	9

=== Year-end charts ===
Year-end chart performance for "Never Enough"
Chart (2008)	Position
US Mainstream Rock (Billboard)	21
