= Far from Home (song) =

Single by Five Finger Death Punch

from the album War Is the Answer
- Released: September 16, 2010
- Recorded: 2009
- Genre: Heavy metal
- Length: 3:32
- Label: Prospect Park
- Songwriters: Zoltan Bathory; Kevin Churko; Ivan Moody; Jason Hook; Jeremy Spencer; Matt Snell
- Producer: Kevin Churko

Five Finger Death Punch singles chronology
| "Bad Company" (2010) | "Far from Home" (2010) | "Under and Over It" (2011) |

Lyric video
- "Far from Home" on YouTube

"Far from Home" is a song by American heavy metal band Five Finger Death Punch. A ballad, it was released on September 16, 2010, as the sixth and final single from their second studio album, War Is the Answer (2009). It debuted at No. 33 on Billboard's Mainstream Rock chart, eventually peaking at No. 4. It debuted at No. 45 on Billboard's Rock Songs chart and has peaked at No. 14.

== Writing and recording ==
Guitarist Zoltan Bathory told Metal Hammer about the song's evolution: "We'd been kicking this song around for over a year, and we did record an early version of it, but somehow we couldn't quite get it to gel. That can happen with songs – you're not sure about them to start them, and then they grow into something special, which is really what happened with 'The Bleeding'… I mean, that only just scraped onto the first album!

"Then Kevin [Churko; producer] heard 'Far From Home', which is kind of a ballad I guess, and he encouraged us to work on it some more, and today of course I'm really glad we did. We changed the structure, added some strings, and generally moved the track up to a whole new level. "Now I would say it's a potential single, but quite a way down the line…"

== Track listing ==
Promo CD
| No. | Title | Length |
|---|---|---|
| 1. | "Far From Home (radio edit)" |
| 2. | "Far From Home (album version)" | 3:32 |

== Personnel ==
- Ivan Moody – vocals
- Jason Hook – guitars
- Zoltan Bathory – guitars
- Matt Snell – bass
- Jeremy Spencer – drums

== Charts ==
=== Weekly charts ===
| Chart (2010–2011) | Peak position |
|---|---|
| US Bubbling Under Hot 100 (Billboard) | 19 |
| US Hot Rock & Alternative Songs (Billboard) | 14 |

=== Year-end charts ===
| Chart (2011) | Position |
|---|---|
| US Hot Rock & Alternative Songs (Billboard) | 39 |
