= The Bleeding (song) =

Single by Five Finger Death Punch

from the album The Way of the Fist
- Released: July 10, 2007
- Genre: Alternative metal
- Length: 4:28
- Label: Firm
- Songwriters: Ivan Moody; Zoltan Bathory
- Producers: Zoltan Bathory; Jeremy Spencer

Five Finger Death Punch singles chronology
"The Bleeding" (2007)	"Never Enough" (2008)

Alternative cover
- UK 7-inch vinyl cover

Music video
- "The Bleeding" on YouTube

"The Bleeding" is a song and the debut single by American heavy metal band Five Finger Death Punch. It is the lead single from the band's first album The Way of the Fist (2007), released through Firm Music.

== Meaning and background ==
When asked by Blistering.com about what happened with his former band Motograter, vocalist Ivan Moody said:

"Well it was a domino effect in Motograter and there were a lot of things that went wrong. Our manager and good friend Steve Richards passed away, then Elektra folded so our label collapsed and then there were a lot of politics involved. It just got to the point where we didn't enjoy what we were doing anymore. There was no love for the music and no love for being on stage with one another, so it just seemed like we were constantly battling one another for different things. We all took time off hoping that would help resolve the issues and then after a year went by I just got tired of sitting on my ass."

"The Bleeding" was written by Moody about his ex-fiancé and his former band Motograter. In an interview with Blistering.com, Moody spoke about what "The Bleeding" is about:

"That song is a two-part song and it comes across as a relationship piece, which it is. Half of it is about my ex-fiancé who meant everything to me, so once Motograter had fell apart and then her and I dwindled apart it just took a huge part of my life. So a lot of that song was about me losing that love and then having to say that it was over and move on. The other half was written about Motograter, because that was the closest thing I've ever had to a real family and it took a huge part of my soul."

When Five Finger Death Punch performed a show in Arizona, the girl who Moody wrote "The Bleeding" about, his ex-fiancé, was at the show. It was the first time Moody saw her in about a year. Moody spoke about it, saying:

"...when we performed in Arizona the girl who I wrote "The Bleeding" for was at the show and that the first time I had seen her in about a year and I almost broke into tears because it all came rushing back to me. I'm not one of those artists that just likes to get up on stage and drink beer, when I sing a song I like to take myself and the fans back to the place where I was when I wrote that song."

When Moody spoke about the first time he heard "The Bleeding", he said:

"When I first heard it, I sat back in my chair and almost cried. I mean, it came so naturally. Cause at the time, you know, I had just separated from my ex-fiancee and with Motograter separating, it was a real tragic time. A good friend of mine had just passed. There was not a more opportune time to write a song like "The Bleeding." It's probably the most personal song I've ever written."

== Music video ==
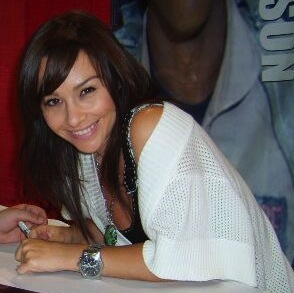
Actress Danielle Harris, 2008

A music video for the song, directed by Bradley Scott, was shot in Los Angeles on July 7–8, 2007. The video features actress Danielle Harris as Ivan Moody's girlfriend, and writer/director Sxv'leithan Essex, who also appeared in Five Finger Death Punch's video for the song "Never Enough" and directed the video for their song "The Way of the Fist". The video was released on July 27, 2007.

The video contains cuts of the band performing the song and a troubled couple portrayed by Harris and Moody. The video begins with Moody driving down an alley passing other members of the band and Sxv'leithan Essex and arriving at his house carrying in a box. When Moody enters the house, he pulls pictures of him and Harris out of the box. It then flashes back to the couple sitting at a table with other members of the band drinking beer, with Harris appearing to be uninterested in talking to Moody. They accidentally spill a beer and the couple then suddenly begin to fight, and bassist Matt Snell then pulls Moody away from his girlfriend. After the fight, it cuts to shots of Harris crying in the mirror and the couple having sex. It then shows Moody reading a letter and Harris taking a large amount of pills. At the end of the video, Harris' feet are shown dangling, implying she had hanged herself. The video ends with Moody taking an urn out of the box and spreading her ashes on the bed.

Moody commented on the video concept: "The video was a concept of mine. We were sitting around a table wondering how to project the visual for that song. One of our favorite songs of ours. I wanted it to be painful. Danielle Harris is the actress ... she was in The Last Boy Scout and the Halloween movies .. I sat down with her and racked her brain about it. It seemed logical to follow the lyrics and make it about what I went through relationship wise. The suicide part is just reality. There are situations out there that are hard to push through. I wanted that video to reconstruct how I felt when I was writing that song."

== Versions ==
There are five versions of the song:

- Album version – This version of the song is included in every edition of The Way of the Fist album.
- "Screamless" version – This version of the song is available as a single on the iTunes library and contains none of the screaming from the album version. The song is shorter than the original because the scream near the beginning of the song was completely removed.
- Acoustic version – This version, known as "The Bleeding (Acoustic)" or "The Bleeding (Unplugged)" is a version of the song performed entirely on acoustic instruments. New vocals were recorded with no screaming, as well as new guitar, drum, and bass tracks. This version came with the band's debut EP, Pre-Emptive Strike, and also with the re-release of The Way of the Fist.
- Instrumental version – This was released on the bonus disc of The Way of the Fist: Iron Fist Edition.
- Re-recorded version – This version of the song is on the re-recorded compilation release of Best of (Volume 1), and despite being the same length as the original version, Ivan's vocals and Zoltan's guitar work are updated, the bass, drum, and the guitar are new.

== Track listing ==
US promo CD
No.	Title	Length
1.	"The Bleeding" (radio edit)	3:55
2.	"The Bleeding" (album version)	4:28

Europe promo CD
No.	Title	Length
1.	"The Bleeding" (album version)	4:28
2.	"The Bleeding" (acoustic)	3:37

Digital download single
No.	Title	Length
1.	"The Bleeding"	4:29
2.	"From Out of Nowehere" (Faith No More cover)	3:23
3.	"The Devil's Own" (live)	4:54

UK digital download single
No.	Title	Length
1.	"The Bleeding"	4:29
2.	"The Bleeding" (acoustic)	3:37
3.	"The Bleeding" ("Screamless")	3:55
4.	"The Bleeding" (video)	4:02
5.	"Interview with Zoltan Bathory" (video)	14:06

"Screamless" single
No.	Title	Length
1.	"The Bleeding" ("Screamless")	3:55

UK 7-inch
No.	Title	Length
1.	"The Bleeding"	4:28
2.	"From Out of Nowehere" (Faith No More cover)	3:23

== Personnel ==
Five Finger Death Punch

- Ivan Moody – vocals
- Darrell Roberts – guitars (original version)
- Zoltan Bathory – guitars
- Matt Snell – bass (original version)
- Jeremy Spencer – drums (original version)
- Chris Kael – bass (re-recorded version)
- Charlie Engen – drums (re-recorded version)
- Andy James – guitars (re-recorded version)

Additional personnel

- Uros Raskovski – guitar solo (original version)

== Charts ==
=== Weekly charts ===
Weekly chart performance for "The Bleeding"
Chart (2008)	Peak position
US Mainstream Rock (Billboard)	9

=== Year-end charts ===
Year-end chart performance for "The Bleeding"
Chart (2008)	Position
US Mainstream Rock Songs (Billboard)	31
