= Chevelle discography =

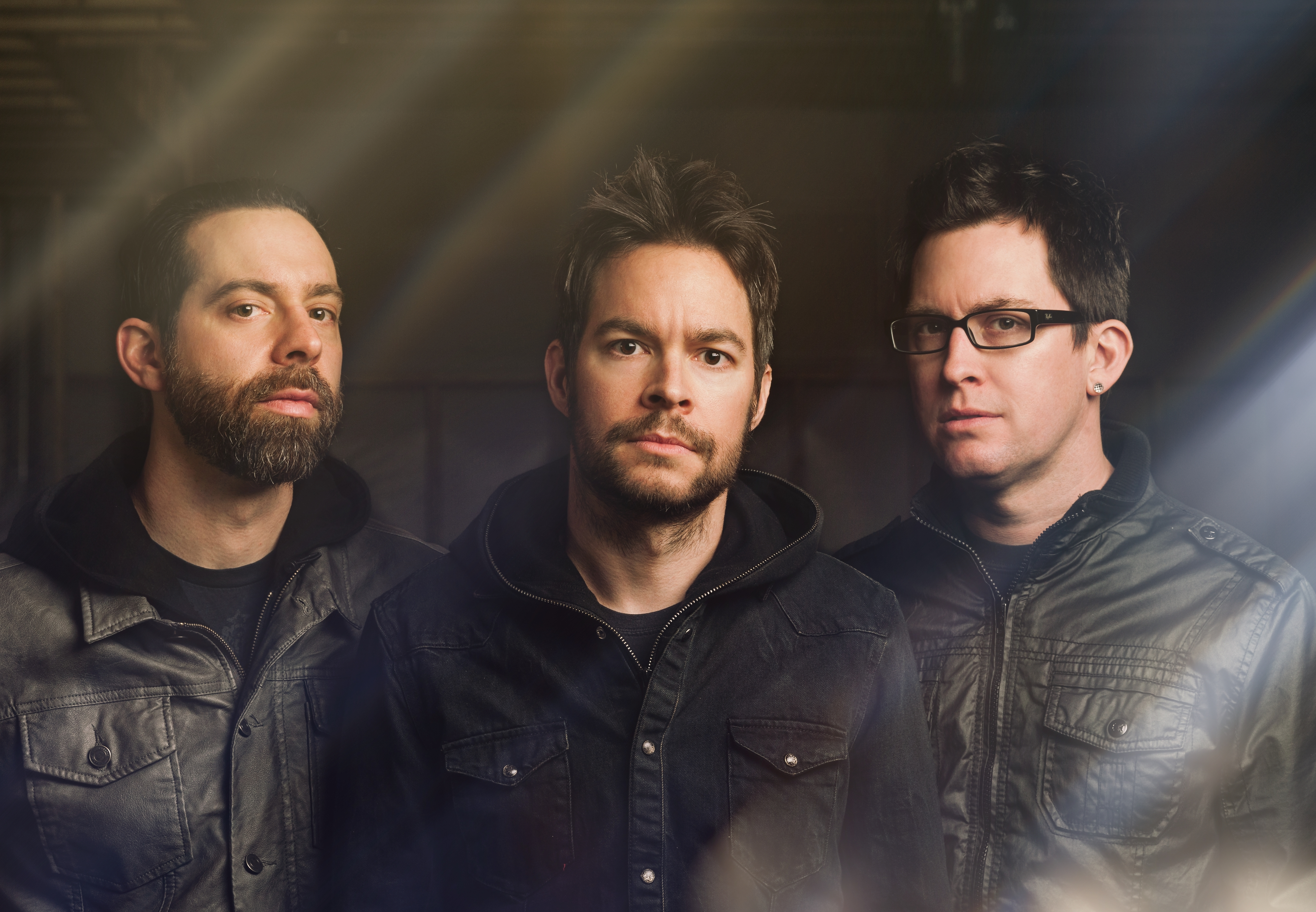
- Chevelle in 2014 (left to right: Dean Bernardini, Pete Loeffler, Sam Loeffler)
- Studio albums: 10
- Live albums: 3
- Compilation albums: 2
- Singles: 31
- Video albums: 2
- Music videos: 20
- Promotional singles: 5

The American rock band Chevelle has released ten studio albums, two compilation albums, three live albums, two video albums, 31 singles, 20 music videos, and five promotional singles. The band was originally formed in 1995 by two brothers Pete Loeffler (lead vocals and guitar) and Sam Loeffler (drums and percussion), along with Matt Scott (bass and backing vocals). Shortly after forming, Scott was replaced by Sam and Pete's brother, Joe Loeffler in 1996. Joe left the band in 2005 and Geno Lenardo joined as the touring bassist until he was replaced by Pete and Sam's brother-in-law, Dean Bernardini. Bernardini later left the band in 2019.

The band's debut studio album, Point #1, was released on a small record label called Squint Entertainment in May 1999. Chevelle's second album, Wonder What's Next was released in October 2002, was certified 2× Platinum by the RIAA after a debut at No. 14 on the United States albums chart, Billboard 200. The band's third album, This Type of Thinking (Could Do Us In) was released in September 2004 and debuted at No. 8, and has been certified Platinum. Chevelle's fourth album, Vena Sera, was released in April 2007 and has been certified Gold. Sci-Fi Crimes, their fifth album, was released in August 2009. Hats Off to the Bull, their sixth album, was released in December 2011. La Gárgola, their seventh album, was released in April 2014. Their eighth album, The North Corridor, was released in July 2016. Their ninth album, NIRATIAS, was released in March 2021. Their tenth album, Bright as Blasphemy, was released in August 2025.

== Albums ==
=== Studio albums ===
List of studio albums, with selected chart positions and sales
Title	Album details	Peak chart positions									Certifications (sales thresholds)	Sales
Title	Album details	US	US Alt.	US Catalog	US Digital	US Hard Rock	US Rock	CAN	AUS	NZ	Certifications (sales thresholds)	Sales
Point #1	Released: May 4, 1999; Label: Squint; Format: CS, CD, DI	—	—	—	—	—	—	—	—	—		
Wonder What's Next	Released: October 8, 2002; Label: Epic; Format: LP, CD, CS, DI	14	—	39	—	—	—	—	—	—	RIAA: 2× Platinum	
This Type of Thinking (Could Do Us In)	Released: September 21, 2004; Label: Epic; Format: CD, CS, LP, DI	8	—	—	—	—	—	—	—	—	RIAA: Platinum	
Vena Sera	Released: April 3, 2007; Label: Epic; Format: CD, DI	12	—	—	12	—	2	—	—	—	RIAA: Gold	
Sci-Fi Crimes	Released: August 31, 2009; Label: Epic; Format: CD, DI	6	1	—	3	1	3	21	—	—		
Hats Off to the Bull	Released: December 6, 2011; Label: Epic; Format: CD, DI	20	5	—	7	3	5	—	—	—		
La Gárgola	Released: April 1, 2014; Label: Epic; Format: CD, DI	3	1	—	4	1	1	9	—	36		US: 153,000
The North Corridor	Released: July 8, 2016; Label: Epic; Format: CD, LP, DI	8	1	—	3	1	1	19	69	2		US: 50,000+
NIRATIAS	Released: March 5, 2021; Label: Epic; Format: CD, LP, DI	9	1	—	1	1	1	68	—	—		
Bright as Blasphemy	Released: August 15, 2025; Label: Alchemy; Format: CD, LP, DI	150	—	—	—	10	—	—	—	—		
"—" denotes a release that did not chart.

=== Compilation albums ===
List of compilation albums, with selected chart positions
Title	Album details	Peak chart positions			
Title	Album details	US	US Alt.	US Hard Rock	US Rock
Stray Arrows: A Collection of Favorites	Release date: December 4, 2012; Label: Epic	195	22	10	38
12 Bloody Spies: B-Sides and Rarities	Release date: October 26, 2018; Label: Epic	139	11	6	21

=== Live albums ===
List of live albums, with selected chart positions
Title	Album details	Peak chart positions
Title	Album details	US
Live from the Road	Released: November 11, 2003; Label: Epic	—
Music as a Weapon II (Note: Music as a Weapon II is a split live album with Disturbed, Taproot and Ünloco from the second Music as a Weapon Tour.)	Released: February 24, 2004; Label: Reprise, Warner Bros.	148
Any Last Words	Released: January 11, 2011	—
"—" denotes a release that did not chart.

== Singles ==
List of singles, with selected chart positions, showing year released and album name
Song	Year	Peak chart positions											Album
Song	Year	US	US Alt.	US Main.	US Hard Digi.	US Hard Rock	US Heat.	US Rock	US Air.	CAN Alt	CAN Rock	Certification	Album
"Point #1"	1999	—	—	40	×	×	—	×	—	—	—		Point #1
"The Red"	2002	56	4	3	×	×	—	×	—	×	×	RIAA: 2× Platinum; RMNZ: Gold	Wonder What's Next
"Send the Pain Below"	2003	65	1	1	×	×	—	×	—	×	×	RIAA: Platinum	Wonder What's Next
"Closure"	2003	— (Note: "Closure" did not enter the Billboard Hot 100 but peaked at No. 20 on the Bubbling Under Hot 100 Singles chart, which acts as an extension to the Hot 100.)	11	17	×	×	—	×	—	×	×		Wonder What's Next
"Vitamin R (Leading Us Along)"	2004	68	3	1	×	×	—	×	—	×	22	RIAA: Gold	This Type of Thinking (Could Do Us In)
"The Clincher"	2005	— (Note: "The Clincher" did not enter the Billboard Hot 100, but peaked at No. 8 on the Bubbling Under Hot 100 Singles chart, which acts as an extension to the Hot 100.)	8	3	×	×	—	×	—	×	×	RIAA: Gold	This Type of Thinking (Could Do Us In)
"Panic Prone"	2005	—	—	26	×	×	—	×	—	×	×		This Type of Thinking (Could Do Us In)
"Well Enough Alone"	2007	— (Note: "Well Enough Alone" did not enter the Billboard Hot 100, but peaked at No. 19 on the Bubbling Under Hot 100 Singles chart, which acts as an extension to the Hot 100.)	9	4	×	×	—	×	—	×	×		Vena Sera
"I Get It"	2007	— (Note: "I Get It" did not enter the Billboard Hot 100, but peaked at No. 18 on the Bubbling Under Hot 100 Singles chart, which acts as an extension to the Hot 100.)	4	5	×	×	—	×	—	×	×	RIAA: Gold	Vena Sera
"The Fad"	2008	—	39	13	×	×	—	×	—	×	×		Vena Sera
"Jars"	2009	— (Note: "Jars" did not enter the Billboard Hot 100, but peaked at No. 10 on the Bubbling Under Hot 100 Singles chart, which acts as an extension to the Hot 100.)	5	3	×	×	14	2	—	27	34	RIAA: Gold	Sci-Fi Crimes
"Letter from a Thief"	2009	—	5	3	×	×	20	4	—	29	—		Sci-Fi Crimes
"Shameful Metaphors"	2010	—	22	28	×	×	—	25	—	—	—		Sci-Fi Crimes
"Face to the Floor"	2011	— (Note: "Face to the Floor" did not enter the Billboard Hot 100, but peaked at No. 10 on the Bubbling Under Hot 100 Singles chart, which acts as an extension to the Hot 100.)	7	1	1	×	16	3	—	33	8	RIAA: Gold	Hats Off to the Bull
"Hats Off to the Bull"	2012	—	17	2	—	×	—	6	—	—	24		Hats Off to the Bull
"Same Old Trip"	2012	—	—	7	—	×	—	—	24	—	—		Hats Off to the Bull
"Take Out the Gunman"	2014	—	24	1	2	×	—	25	8	46	17		La Gárgola
"Hunter Eats Hunter"	2014	—	—	10	1	×	—	—	30	—	—		La Gárgola
"An Island"	2014	—	—	17	—	×	—	—	—	—	—		La Gárgola
"Joyride (Omen)"	2016	—	—	1	8	×	—	40	15	—	17		The North Corridor
"Door to Door Cannibals"	2016	—	—	11	—	×	—	—	39	—	—		The North Corridor
"Rivers"	2017	—	—	22	—	×	—	—	—	—	—		The North Corridor
"Sleep Walking Elite"	2018	—	—	27	—	×	—	—	—	—	—		12 Bloody Spies: B-Sides and Rarities
"Self Destructor"	2021	—	35	1	1	2	—	28	9	—	49		NIRATIAS
"Peach"	2021	—	—	—	7	13	—	—	—	—	—		NIRATIAS
"Remember When"	2021	—	—	—	7	19	—	—	—	—	—		NIRATIAS
"Endlessly"	2021	—	—	—	—	—	—	—	—	—	—		NIRATIAS
"Mars Simula"	2021	—	—	3	—	21	—	—	13	—	—		NIRATIAS
"Rabbit Hole (Cowards, Pt. 1)"	2025	—	—	2	—	16	—	—	16	—	—		Bright as Blasphemy
"Jim Jones (Cowards, Pt. 2)"	2025	—	—	—	—	—	—	—	—	—	—		Bright as Blasphemy
"Pale Horse"	2025	—	—	2	—	22	—	—	13	—	—		Bright as Blasphemy
"—" denotes a release that did not chart. "×" denotes periods where charts did not exist or were not archived.

=== Promotional singles ===
List of promotional singles, showing year released and album name
Song	Year	Album
"Mia"	2000	Point #1
"Get Some"	2005	This Type of Thinking (Could Do Us In)
"Fizgig"	2012	Stray Arrows: A Collection of Favorites
"In Debt to the Earth"	2018	12 Bloody Spies: B-Sides and Rarities
"Delivery"	2018	12 Bloody Spies: B-Sides and Rarities
"—" denotes a release that did not chart or a value that is not applicable.

== Video albums ==
Title	Video details
Live from the Norva	Released: October 14, 2003; Label: Epic
Any Last Words?	Released: January 11, 2011; Label: Epic

== Music videos ==
Year	Song	Director(s)
1999	"Point #1"	Ulf Buddensieck
2000	"Mia"	Jonathan Richter
2002	"The Red"	Nathan Cox
2003	"Send the Pain Below"	Robert Hales
2003	"Closure" (live at NorVa, 05.23.2003)	Sam Erickson
2004	"Vitamin R (Leading Us Along)"	Nathan Cox
2005	"The Clincher"	Nathan Cox
2007	"Well Enough Alone"	Brian Weber
2007	"I Get It"	Citizens of Tomorrow
2008	"The Fad"	Citizens of Tomorrow
2009	"Jars"	Nathan Cox
2009	"Letter from a Thief"	P. R. Brown
2010	"Shameful Metaphors" (live at Verizon Theatre at Grand Prairie, 08.22.2010)	Frankie Nasso
2011	"Face to the Floor"	P. R. Brown
2012	"Hats Off to the Bull"	P. R. Brown
2014	"Take Out the Gunman" (live at The Myth in Maplewood, MN, 04.19.2014)	Michael Dispenza
2016	"Door to Door Cannibals"	Rich Ragsdale
2021	"Self Destructor"	Josh Stone
2021	"Mars Simula"	Josh Stone
2025	"Rabbit Hole (Cowards, Pt. 1)"	

== Cover songs ==
- "Black Boys on Mopeds" by Sinéad O'Connor
- "Black Hole Sun" by Soundgarden
- "Delivery" by Compulsion
- "High Visibility" by Helmet
- "It's No Good" by Depeche Mode
- "Pictures of You" by The Cure
- "Quiet" by The Smashing Pumpkins
- "Thieves" by Ministry

== B-sides ==
- "Build" — found on The Basement Tapes
- "Commuter" — found on The Basement Tapes
- "Credit to You" — found on The Basement Tapes
- "Humidity" — found on The Basement Tapes
- "Blind Beggar" — found on Commuter Trap Demo Tape
- "Blast" — found on Commuter Trap Demo Tape
- "Commuter Trap" — found on Commuter Trap Demo Tape
- "Tom" — acoustic song found on The Blue Album
- "Tetelestai" — found on The Blue Album
- "All of Me" — unreleased song
- "Moda" — unreleased song
- "Send the Pain Below v103" — unreleased remix song
- "The Clincher v103" — remix song found on the DualDisc version of This Type of Thinking (Could Do Us In), "Jars" single, and the 12 Bloody Spies compilation album
- "Fizgig" found on Stray Arrows: A Collection of Favorites and the 12 Bloody Spies compilation album

== Other appearances ==
Year	Song	Title
1999	"Mia"	Road Rash: Jail Break
2000	"Point #1"	Dawson's Creek
2001	"Mia"	Daria
2002	"Family System"	The Osbourne Family Album
2003	"Until You're Reformed"	Daredevil: The Album
2003	"Send the Pain Below"	Madden NFL 2003
2003	"Mia"	Project Gotham Racing 2
2004	"Still Running" (alternate version)	The Punisher: The Album
2004	"The Clincher"	Madden NFL 2005
2005	"Send the Pain Below"	Donkey Konga 2
2005	"Still Running"	MLB 2006
2007	"Antisaint"	MLB 07: The Show
2007	"Tug-O-War"	ATV Offroad Fury 3
2007	"Well Enough Alone"	WWE Smackdown vs RAW 2008
2009	"Jars"	Tony Hawk: Ride
2021	"Self Destructor"	Hitman's Wife's Bodyguard
