= Stray Arrows: A Collection of Favorites =

Greatest hits album by Chevelle
- Released: December 4, 2012
- Genre: Alternative metal; post-grunge; hard rock; progressive rock
- Length: 46:38
- Label: Epic
- Producer: Chevelle

Chevelle chronology
| Hats Off to the Bull (2011) | Stray Arrows: A Collection of Favorites (2012) | La Gárgola (2014) |

Singles from Stray Arrows: A Collection of Favorites
- 1. "Fizgig" Released: November 30, 2012

Professional ratings
Review scores
| Source | Rating |
|---|---|
| AllMusic | 4/5 stars |
| Alternative Addiction | 3.5/5 stars |

Stray Arrows: A Collection of Favorites is a greatest hits album by the American rock band Chevelle, released on December 4, 2012. It includes remastered versions of several hit songs, along with a previously unreleased B-side entitled "Fizgig." The songs on the standard track listing (except for "Sleep Apnea", "The Meddler" and "Fizgig") all cracked the top 10 on Billboard's Mainstream Rock chart, with "Send the Pain Below", "Vitamin R (Leading Us Along)", "Face to the Floor" and "Hats Off to the Bull" all reaching the No. 1 spot.

The album was named Revolver's album of the week on December 10, 2012.

== Track listing ==
All tracks are written by Pete Loeffler.

| No. | Title | Length |
|---|---|---|
| 1. | "Jars" (Sci-Fi Crimes) | 3:21 |
| 2. | "Same Old Trip" (Hats Off to the Bull) | 3:11 |
| 3. | "Vitamin R (Leading Us Along)" (This Type of Thinking (Could Do Us In)) | 3:44 |
| 4. | "The Red" (Wonder What's Next) | 3:59 |
| 5. | "I Get It" (Vena Sera) | 3:57 |
| 6. | "Face to the Floor" (Hats Off to the Bull) | 3:39 |
| 7. | "Send the Pain Below" (Wonder What's Next) | 4:12 |
| 8. | "Sleep Apnea" (Sci-Fi Crimes) | 3:51 |
| 9. | "The Clincher" (This Type of Thinking (Could Do Us In)) | 3:44 |
| 10. | "Hats Off to the Bull" (Hats Off to the Bull) | 3:56 |
| 11. | "The Meddler" (Hats Off to the Bull) | 4:13 |
| 12. | "Fizgig" | 4:51 |
| Total length: | | 46:38 |

Best Buy version
| No. | Title | Length |
|---|---|---|
| 1. | "Jars" | 3:19 |
| 2. | "Same Old Trip" | 3:09 |
| 3. | "Vitamin R (Leading Us Along)" | 3:42 |
| 4. | "The Red" | 3:57 |
| 5. | "I Get It" | 3:55 |
| 6. | "Face to the Floor" | 3:39 |
| 7. | "Saferwaters" (Vena Sera) | 4:11 |
| 8. | "Send the Pain Below" | 4:12 |
| 9. | "Sleep Apnea" | 3:50 |
| 10. | "The Clincher" | 3:42 |
| 11. | "Open / Point #1" (Point #1) | 6:23 |
| 12. | "Envy" (Hats Off to the Bull) | 4:19 |
| 13. | "Hats Off to the Bull" | 3:55 |
| 14. | "The Meddler" | 4:13 |
| 15. | "Closure" (Wonder What's Next) | 4:10 |
| 16. | "Fizgig" | 4:54 |
| Total length: | | 65:30 |

== Personnel ==
- Pete Loeffler – vocals, guitar
- Sam Loeffler – drums
- Dean Bernardini – bass (tracks 1, 2, 4–6, 8, 10–11)
- Joe Loeffler – bass (tracks 3, 7, 9, 12)

== Charts ==
| Chart (2012) | Peak positions |
|---|---|
| US Billboard 200 | 195 |
| US Alternative Albums | 22 |
| US Hard Rock Albums | 10 |
| US Rock Albums | 38 |
