= 12 Bloody Spies =

Compilation album by Chevelle
- Released: October 26, 2018
- Recorded: 2001–2016
- Genre: Alternative metal
- Length: 45:30
- Label: Epic
- Producer: Various

Chevelle chronology
The North Corridor (2016)	12 Bloody Spies (2018)	NIRATIAS (2021)

Singles from 12 Bloody Spies
- 1. "Sleep Walking Elite" Released: September 27, 2018; 2. "In Debt to the Earth" Released: October 12, 2018

12 Bloody Spies is the second compilation album by the American rock band Chevelle. The album was released on October 26, 2018, by Epic Records. The album consists of B-sides, rarities, covers, and remixes recorded between 2001 and 2016.

== Background ==
The single, "Sleep Walking Elite", a B-side from the Vena Sera sessions, was released on September 27, 2018. On September 28, the compilation album was announced. The album's second single, "In Debt to the Earth," was released on October 12.

The song, "Until You're Reformed", a B-side from the Wonder What's Next sessions, was originally released in 2003 on Daredevil: The Album. "Fizgig," a B-side from the Sci-Fi Crimes sessions, was originally released on the band's greatest hits album Stray Arrows: A Collection of Favorites in 2012.

== Track listing ==
No.	Title	Writer(s)	Producer(s)	Length
1.	"A Miracle" (The North Corridor sessions, '16)	Dean Bernardini; Sam Loeffler; Pete Loeffler	Joe Barresi	5:31
2.	"Sleep Walking Elite" (Vena Sera sessions, '07)	Bernardini; S. Loeffler; P. Loeffler	Michael Baskette	3:39
3.	"In Debt to the Earth" (Vena Sera sessions, '07)	Bernardini; S. Loeffler; P. Loeffler	Baskette	4:12
4.	"Sleep Apnea" (Acoustic version) (Sci-Fi Crimes sessions, '09)	P. Loeffler	Brian Virtue; Chevelle	2:22
5.	"The Clincher" (Version 103) (This Type of Thinking sessions, '04)	P. Loeffler; S. Loeffler	Baskette	3:39
6.	"Fizgig" (Stray Arrows: A Collection of Favorites, '12)	P. Loeffler	Virtue; Chevelle	4:51
7.	"Glimpse of the Con" (Hats Off to the Bull sessions, '11)	Bernardini; S. Loeffler; P. Loeffler	Joe Barresi	5:59
8.	"Indifference" (Hats Off to the Bull sessions, '11)	Bernardini; S. Loeffler; P. Loeffler	Barresi	2:10
9.	"Until You're Reformed" (Wonder What's Next sessions, '02)	Joe Loeffler; S. Loeffler; P. Loeffler	Garth Richardson	4:00
10.	"The Gist" (instrumental; Sci-Fi Crimes sessions, '09)	P. Loeffler	Virtue; Chevelle	1:44
11.	"Delivery" (Compulsion cover; Vena Sera sessions, '07)	Compulsion	Baskette	3:03
12.	"Leto's Headache" (Sci-Fi Crimes sessions, '09)	P. Loeffler	Virtue; Chevelle	4:21
Total length:				45:30

== Personnel ==
- Pete Loeffler – lead vocals, guitar
- Sam Loeffler – drums
- Dean Bernardini – bass, backing vocals
- Joe Loeffler – bass, backing vocals (tracks 5 and 9)

== Charts ==
Chart (2018)	Peak position
US Billboard 200	139
US Top Alternative Albums (Billboard)	11
US Top Rock Albums (Billboard)	21
