= La Gárgola =

Studio album by Chevelle
- Released: April 1, 2014
- Studio: JHOC (Pasadena, California)
- Genres: Hard rock; alternative metal; heavy metal; progressive metal
- Length: 48:29
- Label: Epic
- Producer: Joe Barresi

Chevelle chronology
Stray Arrows: A Collection of Favorites (2012)	La Gárgola (2014)	The North Corridor (2016)

Singles from La Gárgola
- 1. "Take Out the Gunman" Released: February 4, 2014; 2. "Hunter Eats Hunter" Released: June 24, 2014; 3. "An Island" Released: November 19, 2014

La Gárgola (Spanish for "The Gargoyle") is the seventh studio album by the American rock band Chevelle. It was released on April 1, 2014 in the US and on June 9, 2014 in the UK.

The album cover depicts vocalist Pete Loeffler wearing a plague doctor mask. Joe Barresi, who produced the band's previous studio album, Hats Off to the Bull, returned as the producer for this album. In August 2019, and with the collaboration of Revolution Brewing, Chevelle announced the release of their Helles Lager beer, named after the album and featuring the same illustration as the cover art.

== Composition ==
La Gárgola has been described as hard rock, alternative metal, heavy metal, and progressive metal. The album has been described as a darker and heavier album for the band.

"Hunter Eats Hunter" is a guitar-driven song with a "sinister vibe".

== Release ==
"Take Out the Gunman" was released as the lead single for the album on February 4, 2014. It topped the Billboard Mainstream Rock chart. "Hunter Eats Hunter" was released as the second single on June 24, 2014. "An Island" was released as the third single on November 19, 2014. The band had plans to release "One Ocean" as the third single. However, "An Island" was ultimately released as the third and final single for the album. The album cover depicts vocalist Pete Loeffler wearing a plague doctor mask. The album was released on April 1, 2014 in the US and on June 9, 2014 in the UK.

In August 2019, and with the collaboration of Revolution Brewing, Chevelle announced the release of their Helles Lager beer, named after the album and featuring the same illustration as the cover art.

== Reception ==
Professional ratings
Review scores
Source	Rating
AllMusic	4/5 stars
Exclaim!	6/10
Loudwire	4/5 stars
Sputnikmusic	4.1/5
Ultimate Guitar	9/10

Early critical reception to the album has been generally positive and has since gained high acclaim. AllMusic reviewer Gregory Heaney said the band has "found a way to avoid the perils of age and complacency, with the band somehow growing more into its own with each album...the real key to (La Gárgola) lies in open and ambient cuts like album closer "Twinge," where the heaviness is implied with ominous, reverb-drenched guitars and mysterious, almost mantra-like vocal repetition, creating a subtle tension that just can't be accomplished by distorted, in-your-face guitars." Loudwire noted that the experimentation is noticed in the album and comments about the band thinking outside the box. They go on to state "All in all, fans have come to know what to expect from Chevelle and the band definitely deliver on many of the signature sounds they've generated over the years." Loudwire ranked La Gárgola No. 2 on their list of Best Rock Albums of 2014 and No. 42 on their 66 Best Rock Albums of the Decade: 2010-2019, and included it in their list of the Best Hard Rock Album of Each Year Since 1970. Additionally, Loudwire ranked "Take Out the Gunman" as fourth greatest Chevelle song, with "Hunter Eats Hunter" placing at tenth place.

Greg Fisher of Sputnikmusic stated "Deriving its title from a grotesquely carved figure, La Gárgola is by far the trio's darkest release, and the darkness suits them." Michael Rancic of Exclaim! was less positive stating "Inventiveness and originality aren't in Chevelle's playbook, which should surprise no one, but it still makes it difficult to want to come back to this rather front-loaded album for repeat listens."

== Commercial performance ==
La Gargola debuted at No. 3 on the Billboard 200 albums chart, selling 44,900 copies in the first week and becoming the band's highest charting album. The album has sold 153,000 copies in the United States as of July 2016.

"Hunter Eats Hunter" reached No. 30 on weekly US Rock Airplay chart, while "An Island" peaked at 17 position on weekly US Mainstream Rock chart.

== Track listing ==
All lyrics written by Pete Loeffler, all music composed by Pete Loeffler, Sam Loeffler, and Dean Bernardini.

No.	Title	Length
1.	"Ouija Board"	4:18
2.	"An Island"	5:11
3.	"Take Out the Gunman"	4:18
4.	"Jawbreaker"	4:54
5.	"Hunter Eats Hunter"	5:45
6.	"One Ocean"	5:49
7.	"Choking Game"	5:23
8.	"The Damned"	4:15
9.	"Under the Knife"	3:57
10.	"Twinge"	4:39
Total length:		48:29

== Personnel ==
Chevelle

- Pete Loeffler – vocals, guitars
- Sam Loeffler – drums
- Dean Bernardini – bass, drums on "Ouija Board"

Production

- Joe Barresi – production, mixing
- Chevelle – co-production
- Dave Collins – mastering

== Charts ==
Chart (2014)	Peak position
Canadian Albums (Billboard)	9
New Zealand Albums (RMNZ)	36
US Billboard 200	3
US Top Rock Albums (Billboard)	1
US Top Alternative Albums (Billboard)	1
US Top Hard Rock Albums (Billboard)	1

=== Year-end charts ===
Chart (2014)	Position
US Billboard 200	196
US Billboard Alternative Albums	30
US Billboard Hard Rock Albums	12
US Billboard Rock Albums	45
