= Family system =

Family system may refer to:

- Family, a domestic group of people (or a number of domestic groups), typically affiliated by birth or marriage, or by comparable legal relationships
- "Family System", a song by Chevelle from their 2002 album Wonder What's Next
- Internal Family Systems Model, a branch of psychotherapy focused on a metaphorical inner family that represents the different modes of human behavior
- Family Therapy, a branch of therapy that works with families
- Family Systems Theory, a branch of Systems psychology focused on the psychological relationship to ones family
- Family System (martial arts)
