= Music as a Weapon =

Series of concert tours created by American metal band Disturbed

Music as a Weapon is a series of concert tours created by the American heavy metal band Disturbed. There have been seven editions of the tour, five in North America and two in Australia. The name of the tour is from the lyrics of "Droppin' Plates" on Disturbed's first album, The Sickness.

== Line-ups ==
=== Music as a Weapon (2001) ===
- Disturbed
- Drowning Pool
- Adema
- Stereomud
- Systematic

=== Music as a Weapon II (2003) ===
- Disturbed
- Chevelle
- Taproot
- Ünloco

=== Music as a Weapon III (2006) ===
- Disturbed
- Stone Sour
- Flyleaf
- Nonpoint

=== Music as a Weapon: Australia and New Zealand (2008) ===
For a list of tour dates, see Indestructible Tour.

- Disturbed
- P.O.D.
- Alter Bridge
- Redline
- Behind Crimson Eyes

=== Music as a Weapon IV (2009) ===
For a list of tour dates, see Indestructible Tour.

- Disturbed
- Killswitch Engage
- Lacuna Coil
- Chimaira
- Suicide Silence
- Spineshank
- Crooked X
- Bury Your Dead
- Born of Osiris
- After the Burial

=== Music as a Weapon V (2011) ===
For a list of tour dates, see Asylum Tour.

- Disturbed
- Korn
- Sevendust
- In This Moment
- StillWell (second leg only)

This was the first time Music as a Weapon had co-headliners, Disturbed and Korn.

=== Music as a Weapon: Australia and New Zealand (2011) ===
For a list of tour dates, see Asylum Tour.

- Disturbed
- Trivium
- As I Lay Dying
- Forgiven Rival (Australian dates only)
- These Four Walls (NZ dates only)

== Live albums ==
=== Music as a Weapon II ===
Music as a Weapon II

Live album by Disturbed, Chevelle, Taproot and Ünloco
- Released: February 24, 2004
- Recorded: 2003
- Genre: Nu metal; alternative metal
- Label: Reprise; Warner Bros.

Disturbed chronology
Believe (2002)	Music as a Weapon II (2004)	Ten Thousand Fists (2005)

Chevelle chronology
Live from the Road (2003)	Music as a Weapon II (2004)	This Type of Thinking (Could Do Us In) (2004)

Taproot chronology
Welcome (2002)	Music as a Weapon II (2004)	Blue-Sky Research (2005)

Ünloco chronology
Becoming I (2003)	Music as a Weapon II (2004)

Professional ratings
Review scores
Source	Rating
AllMusic	2.5/5 stars

Music as a Weapon II was recorded as a live album and DVD, created by Disturbed. It was recorded at The Aragon in Chicago in 2003, and released in 2004. It contains Disturbed's cover of Metallica's "Fade to Black" and the previously unreleased song "Dehumanized". The DVD also contains Disturbed's video for their single "Liberate". This was Disturbed's last release with bass guitarist Steve Kmak. It was also Ünloco's final release before splitting up.

==== Track listing ====
No.	Title	Artist	Length
1.	"Loading the Weapon" (instrumental)	Disturbed	2:33
2.	"Bound"	Disturbed	3:54
3.	"Myself"	Taproot	3:36
4.	"Dehumanized"	Disturbed	3:44
5.	"Forfeit"	Chevelle	4:06
6.	"Fade to Black" (Metallica cover)	Disturbed	4:26
7.	"Empty"	Ünloco, written by Tim Wilson	4:03
8.	"Sumtimes"	Taproot	4:42
9.	"Darkness"	Disturbed	4:02
10.	"Bruises"	Ünloco	2:50
11.	"Prayer"	Disturbed	3:49
12.	"The Red"	Chevelle and David Draiman	3:46
13.	"Poem"	Taproot	3:20
14.	"Stupify"	Disturbed, Pete Loeffler and Joey Duenas	4:28

==== Chart positions ====
Chart (2004)	Peak position
Billboard 200	148
