= Live from the Road =

Live album by Chevelle
- Released: November 11, 2003
- Recorded: 2003
- Genre: Alternative metal
- Length: 42:33
- Label: Epic
- Producer: Chevelle, Dave Pinsky

Chevelle live albums chronology
Live from the Road (2003)	Any Last Words (2011)

Live from the Road is the first live album by American rock band Chevelle. It was released in 2003 on Epic Records. It was recorded on Ozzfest 2003, where Chevelle served as a mainstage act, and accompanies the concert DVD Live from the Norva, released October 13. Live from the Road features songs from Chevelle's first two albums, 1999's Point #1 and 2002's Platinum-selling Wonder What's Next.

== Reception ==
Professional ratings
Review scores
Source	Rating
Jesus Freak Hideout	1/5 stars

Jesus Freak Hideout editor panned the album, saying it was "clearly not as good as the two studio albums Chevelle has released previously". The editor allocate the main problem to the poor vocals recording, "completely drowned out over the music as well as off key occasionally". They however, liked singled out the track "Until You're Reformed" as a highlight.

== Track listing ==
No.	Title	Length
1.	"Family System"	4:07
2.	"Forfeit"	4:09
3.	"Point #1"	6:42
4.	"Until You're Reformed"	4:04
5.	"Send the Pain Below"	4:18
6.	"SMA"	3:11
7.	"Wonder What's Next"	4:33
8.	"MIA"	2:50
9.	"Grab Thy Hand"	4:15
10.	"The Red"	4:25
Total length:		42:33

== Credits ==
- Barnaby Draper – photography
- Ben Goldman – A&R
- Chevelle – producer
- Dave Pinsky – engineer, mixing, producer
- Farra Mathews – A&R
- Thom Cadley – mixing
