= Chevelle (band) =

American rock band

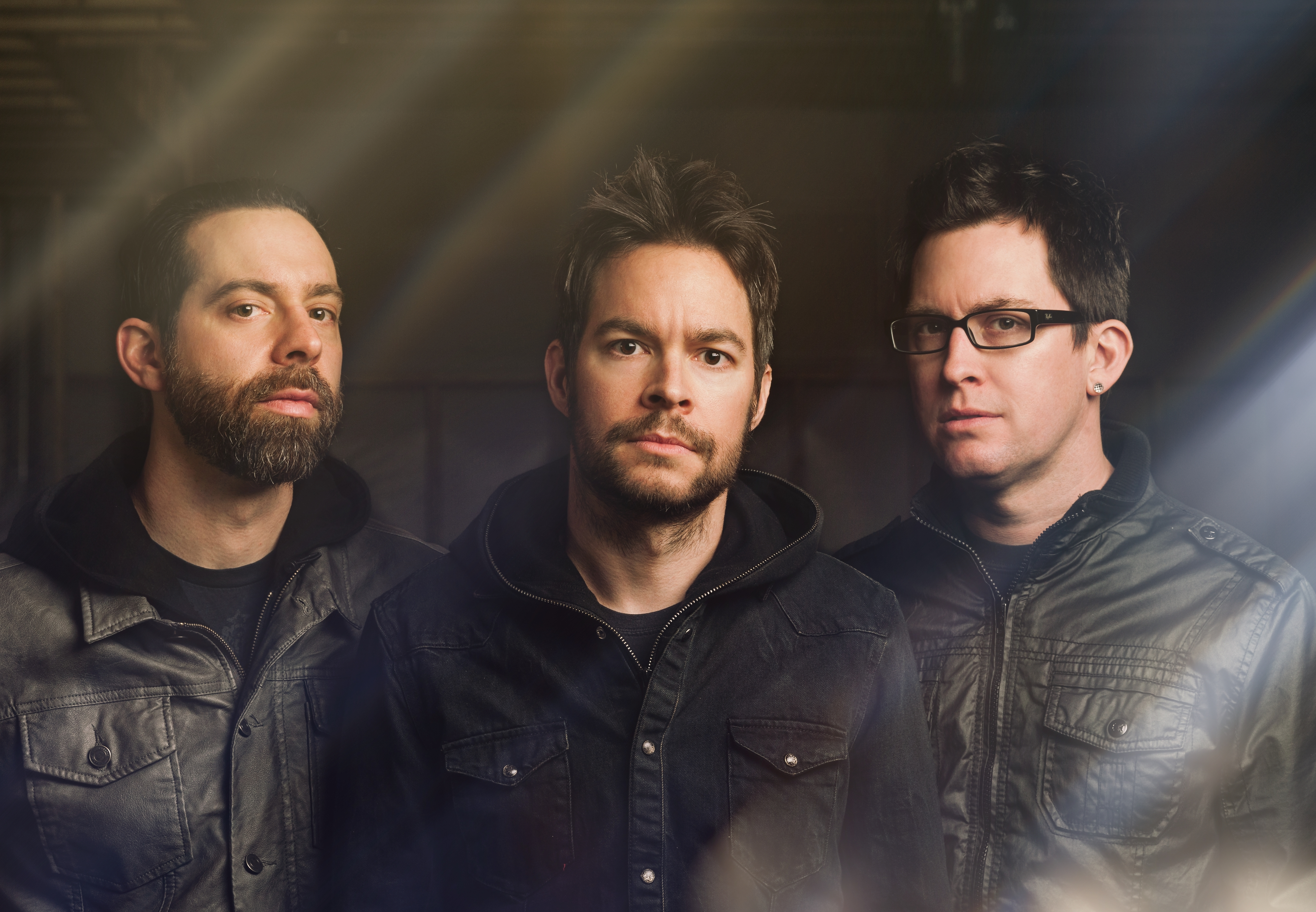
- Chevelle in 2014 (left to right: Dean Bernardini, Pete Loeffler, Sam Loeffler)

Background information
- Origin: Grayslake, Illinois, U.S.
- Genres: Hard rock; alternative metal; alternative rock; post-grunge
- Works: Chevelle discography
- Years active: 1995–present
- Labels: Squint; Epic; Alchemy Recordings
- Members: Pete Loeffler; Sam Loeffler
- Past members: Matt Scott; Joe Loeffler; Dean Bernardini
- Website: getmorechevelle.com

Chevelle is an American rock band formed in Grayslake, Illinois, in 1995. The band was originally composed of two brothers, Pete Loeffler (lead vocals and guitar) and Sam Loeffler (drums and percussion), along with Matt Scott (bass and backing vocals). Scott was replaced by Sam and Pete's brother, Joe Loeffler, in 1996. When Joe left the band in 2005, Geno Lenardo subbed in as the touring bassist until he was replaced by Pete and Sam's brother-in-law, Dean Bernardini. Bernardini departed from the band in 2019, and in 2021, Kemble Walters joined the band as a touring bassist.

The band's first studio album, Point #1, was released on a small record label called Squint Entertainment. Chevelle's second album, Wonder What's Next (2002), was certified double platinum by the RIAA after a debut at No. 14 on the United States albums chart, Billboard 200. This Type of Thinking (Could Do Us In) (2004), the band's third album debuted at No. 8 and has been certified platinum. Chevelle has since released seven more albums: Vena Sera (2007), Sci-Fi Crimes (2009), Hats Off to the Bull (2011), La Gárgola (2014), The North Corridor (2016), NIRATIAS (2021), and Bright as Blasphemy (2025). Other releases from Chevelle include two live albums, two DVDs, and two compilation albums. As of 2022, the band has sold over 6 million records.

== History ==
=== Formation, Point #1, and Wonder What's Next (1995–2003) ===
Logo used since Wonder What's Next.

Chevelle formed in 1995 in Grayslake, Illinois, when brothers Pete Loeffler and Sam Loeffler started enjoying and learning to play music. Pete started playing guitar and singing while Sam began playing drums in their parents' garage. Bassist Matt Scott was also in the band until 1996. Their youngest brother Joe Loeffler joined the band replacing Scott. Each of the band members were self-taught musicians. The name Chevelle came from the Chevrolet Chevelle, a car popular in the Midwestern hot rod scene around which the Loeffler brothers grew up. The band started playing small outdoor concerts and clubs around Chicago, Illinois, with Joe being only 14 years old.

Chevelle recorded a seven-track demo known as The Blue Album, released in 1998. The band played small concerts for the next three years until they were signed on to Steve Taylor's Squint Entertainment, a contemporary Christian music label. The band recorded with Steve Albini for 17 days in Electrical Audio studios and released its first full-length album, Point #1 in 1999. Two singles were released from the album with accompanying music videos, "Point #1" and "Mia". The songs received GMA Dove Awards in 2000 and "Point #1" in 2001. The album received an award for "Hard Music Album" in 2000 by the Dove Awards. The album was well received by Phantom Tollbooth and HM Magazine, yet was criticized for its repetitive song structures by Jesus Freak Hideout, a Christian music website. The band's label at the time was going through legal troubles as Word Records was attempting to wrest control of Squint from Taylor. This caused uncertainty with the band's future. Discussing the legal battle, bassist Joe Loeffler stated "we weren't sure if anything was going to happen after that, it was pretty crazy."

"The Red"
Sample of "The Red" from Wonder What's Next. This is the single that launched Chevelle into mainstream music.

Chevelle toured as support to bands such as Sevendust, Machine Head, Filter, and Powerman 5000 in this period. Squint Entertainment closed down in 2001 and the band signed with Epic Records in 2002. In 2002 Chevelle released its second studio album Wonder What's Next on Epic Records. The band released the single "The Red", which reached No. 3 on the Mainstream rock charts, and the video was played in regular rotation on MTV. Wonder What's Next soon peaked at No. 14 on the United States Billboard 200 album chart. Brian O'Neil of AllMusic stated the album "offers uniqueness not often heard in more commercial fare, no mean feat." Chevelle released two more singles from the album, "Closure", and "Send the Pain Below", the latter of which reached the No. 1 position on both of the mainstream rock and modern rock charts. Wonder What's Next was certified 2× platinum by the RIAA with excess sales of one million copies sold in the United States alone in 2003. Chevelle was nominated for three awards at the 2003 Billboard Music Awards. One as a band and two for their song "Send the Pain Below". The categories they were nominated for were Modern Rock Artist, Modern Rock Track, and Top Rock Song.

In 2003, Chevelle performed at Ozzfest, where the band recorded and later released its first live album, Live from the Road, and a live DVD, Live from the Norva on October 14, 2003. In 2003, the band was featured on the Music as a Weapon II tour with Disturbed. On the tour with Disturbed, Chevelle appeared on the tour compilation album, titled Music as a Weapon II, featuring the songs "The Red" and "Forfeit". Keith Miller of EvangelSociety.org was critical of Chevelle for touring with Ozzfest with bands such as Cradle of Filth, who he claimed incorporated strong Satanic and anti-Christian themes into their lyrics. Chevelle held their first major headlining tour, from November 1 to December 17, 2003. The tour started in Cleveland and ended in Chicago.

In 2004, Sam Loeffler said, "It's something that's probably going to follow us around forever and that's fine. It's pretty simple. We originally signed with a record company that was backed by Word (a Christian label housing John Tesh and Amy Grant), so [Point #1] was in Christian bookstores. It was really an accidental thing". Sam also told the Chicago Tribune, "Our faith is still extremely important to us, but it's also very personal. None of us feels being a rock band on stage should be a pedestal for preaching".

=== Line-up changes, This Type of Thinking (Could Do Us In), and Vena Sera (2004–2008) ===
This Type of Thinking (Could Do Us In) was recorded in early 2004 and was released on September 21, 2004. The album debuted at No. 8 on the Billboard 200, and was certified gold by the RIAA six weeks later. Johnny Loftus of AllMusic described the songs on the album as "strong dynamically, but sound predetermined — they don't separate from the general loud rock malaise." The song "Vitamin R (Leading Us Along)" was released as the first single from the album and reached the No. 1 position on the Mainstream Rock chart. Two other singles were released from the album, the titles of which are "The Clincher" peaking at No. 3 on the Mainstream rock chart, and "Panic Prone" which peaked at No. 26 on the same chart. The band's song "The Clincher" was featured in the video games Madden NFL 2005 and NASCAR 25.

After the release of the album, the youngest of the brothers, Joe Loeffler, was dismissed from Chevelle. Due to different stories from the band members, it is unclear whether he was fired or left the band of his own accord. Pete and Sam stated the following on the band's official website: "After three years of non-stop touring and recording, Joe is taking a break to be home with family. We'll miss having him on the road with us, but as his brothers and bandmates we respect his decision and are looking forward to getting out there and playing for the fans. See you on tour." However, according to Ultimate Guitar Archive, Joe said he was fired.

The band supported This Type of Thinking (Could Do Us In) with a headlining tour that included opening acts such as Taproot and Thirty Seconds to Mars, and continued playing small tours in 2005 with Geno Lenardo from the band Filter. In August 2005, the Loeffler brothers' brother-in-law and longtime friend, Dean Bernardini joined the band as their newest bassist. In 2006 Chevelle supported Nickelback for an arena tour across the United States.

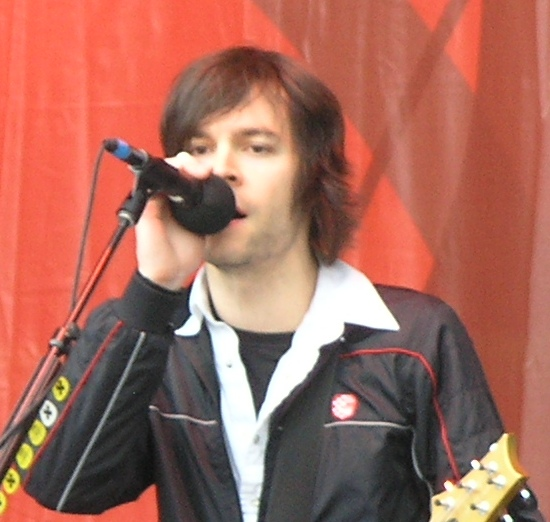
Vocalist and guitarist Pete Loeffler performing in 2007 at MyCokeFest in Atlanta

In 2006, the band recorded their fourth studio album titled Vena Sera. The album was the first album Chevelle recorded with Bernardini. Vena Sera was released on April 3, 2007, debuting at No. 12 on the Billboard 200, and sold 62,000 copies during its first week of release. The title of the album translates to "vein liquid" in Latin, representing the blood Chevelle put into making the album, according to Pete.

Corey Apar of AllMusic states that "Vena Sera probably won't disappoint fans, and it didn't, if for the sole fact that it basically sounds just like Chevelle's other albums". He noted that the song "I Get It" "has a relatively lighter underbelly than the rest, which is a nice change of pace, but it's ultimately too little, too late". "Well Enough Alone", the first single from the album, was written about the departure of Joe Loeffler, and reached No. 4 on the Mainstream rock charts. Chevelle toured with Evanescence and Finger Eleven during March and April 2007, followed by a headlining tour with Finger Eleven and Strata in May and June. The second single from the album, "I Get It", was released on June 12, 2007, and a video for the song debuted on MTV on November 27, 2007. In July of the same year, Chevelle toured Australia as a supporting act for the band The Butterfly Effect. On the tour in Australia, Chevelle's band manager Rose died of cancer, much to the distress of the band.

On May 9, 2007, during a show in Fort Worth, Texas Chevelle's trailer containing all of the band's equipment was stolen from the hotel at which the members were staying. The band posted a notice saying, "Most items are labeled 'Chevelle' and if you notice anything suspicious on eBay or other online resellers selling 'authentic' Chevelle items... guitar, basses, drums, amplifiers, risers, backdrops, tee shirts... please call the police..." A month later in an interview, Sam Loeffler stated, "Of the 14 guitars, we got two of 'em, and then we got some amplifiers back and our monitor system. So it's really, I mean it's cool because it's kind of like Christmas, only really weird. People have been calling us and saying, 'Hey, I bought this or that', and you know, we're just doing our best to buy it back from them. And certainly the issue is not a money issue, it's about having the pieces of gear that you did all your records with."

=== Sci-Fi Crimes and Hats Off to the Bull (2009–2012) ===
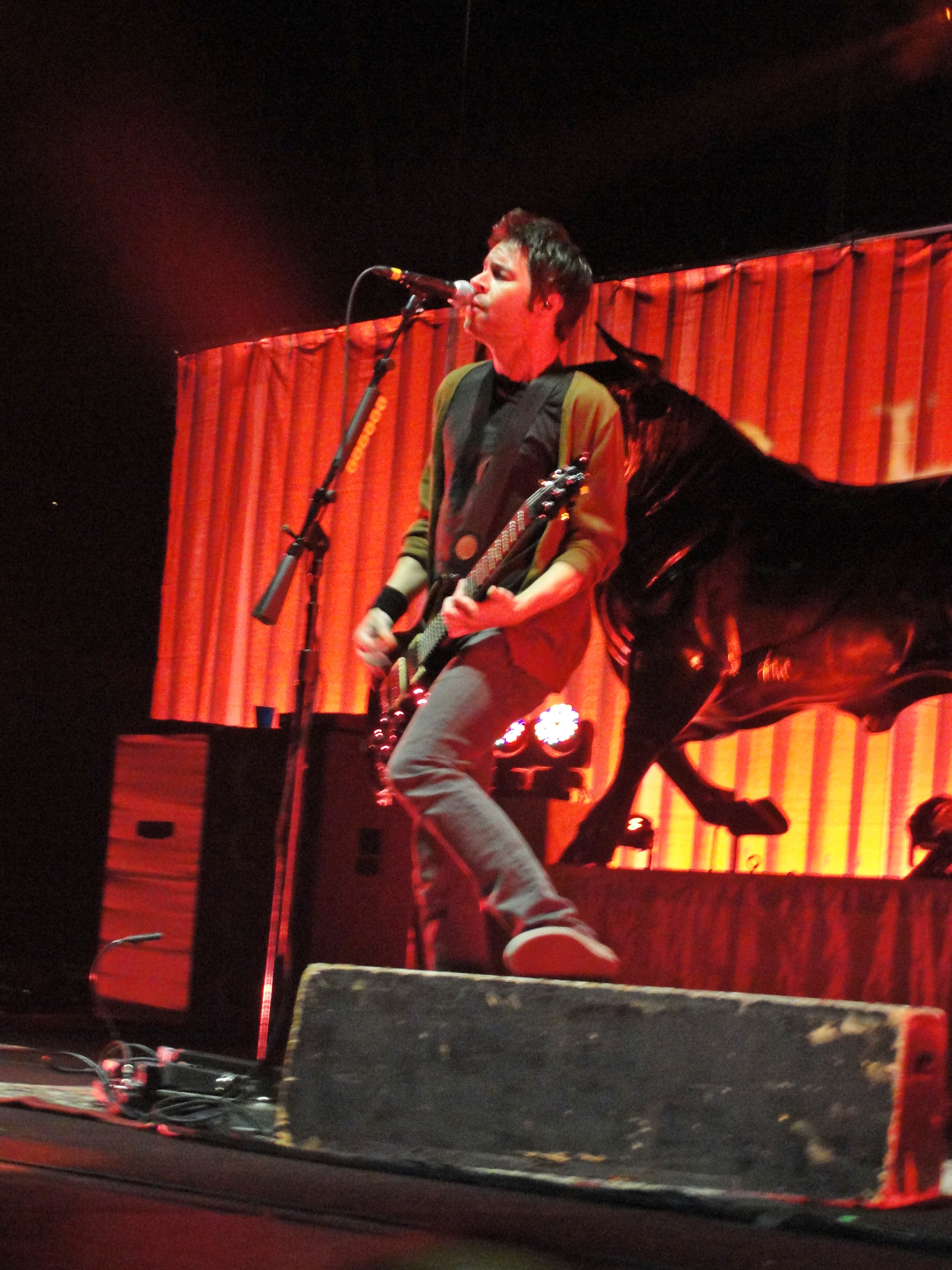
Pete Loeffler performing live at the Carnival of Madness tour in 2012 at the Laredo Energy Arena

In 2009, Chevelle entered a studio in Nashville, Tennessee with producer Brian Virtue. Sam Loeffler stated, "We have spent a lot of time making these songs something different from past records without losing the core of our passion. We are a hard rock, melodic band and it's still what drives us as musicians." The new album, titled Sci-Fi Crimes was released on August 31, 2009, peaking at No. 6 on the Billboard 200 album chart with sales of about 46,000, the highest entry onto the chart to date for the band. The album was praised by Jared Johnson of AllMusic for taking a step in a new direction in regards to the lyrics. Pete Loeffler normally wrote lyrics about personal subjects. However, on Sci-Fi Crimes he wrote of stories including apparitions, conspiracy theories, and erratic sleeping conditions. The tour following the release of Sci-Fi Crimes was in the late 2009. Halestorm opened for Chevelle on this tour. Chevelle also joined Halestorm, Staind, and Shinedown on "Stimulate This!" tour starting in July 2009.

In January 2011, Chevelle released a live CD/DVD combo, Any Last Words. The release was part of Chevelle's ten-year anniversary as a recording band. As a special offer for fans, part of the pre-order package included a T-shirt and the fans' name in the 'thank yous' part of the album booklet.

On December 6, 2011, Chevelle released Hats Off to the Bull, their sixth studio album. The album's first single was titled "Face to the Floor", which reached No. 3 on Billboard's Rock songs chart. The album debuted at No. 20 on the Billboard charts and sold 43,000 copies in its first week of release. Joe Barresi, who produced Hats Off to the Bull said of the album, "Rather than simply subscribing to a tried-and-true formula, they made a conscious effort to incorporate new sounds and textures into their patented airtight anthems. As a result, Hats Off to the Bull is one of the group's most infectious and impressive offerings to date." AllMusic reviewer Gregory Heaney stated the album is "Heavy and dramatic, the album is packed full of tightly coiled, muscular riffs, giving the album a controlled feeling more like a slow burn than an explosive, cathartic release."

Chevelle was nominated for Rock Band of the Year at the 2012 Loudwire Music Awards. Also, a compilation album of band favorites called Stray Arrows: A Collection of Favorites, was released to stores on December 4, 2012. The compilation includes 11 songs and a previously unreleased track titled "Fizgig". The Best Buy version has 15 songs and the track "Fizgig".

=== La Gárgola, The North Corridor and departure of Dean Bernardini (2013–2019) ===
After wrapping up touring in support of Hats off to the Bull in 2013, Chevelle entered the studio to record their seventh album, re-teaming with Joe Barresi to produce the album. Recording and production finished early in 2014, and the band announced on February 1 that the album, to be released April 1, 2014, would be titled La Gárgola (Spanish for "the gargoyle"). Lead singer Pete Loeffler describes that the album is about "the dark underbelly of American culture." The first single from the album, titled "Take Out the Gunman", was released on February 3, 2014. The other singles from the album are "Hunter Eats Hunter" and "An Island". The album reached the top of the Rock Album chart in April 2014. Chevelle was nominated for four awards at the 2014 Loudwire Music Awards. The categories were, Best Rock Band, Best Rock Album (La Gárgola), Best Bassist (Dean Bernardini), and Best Rock Song ("Take Out the Gunman").

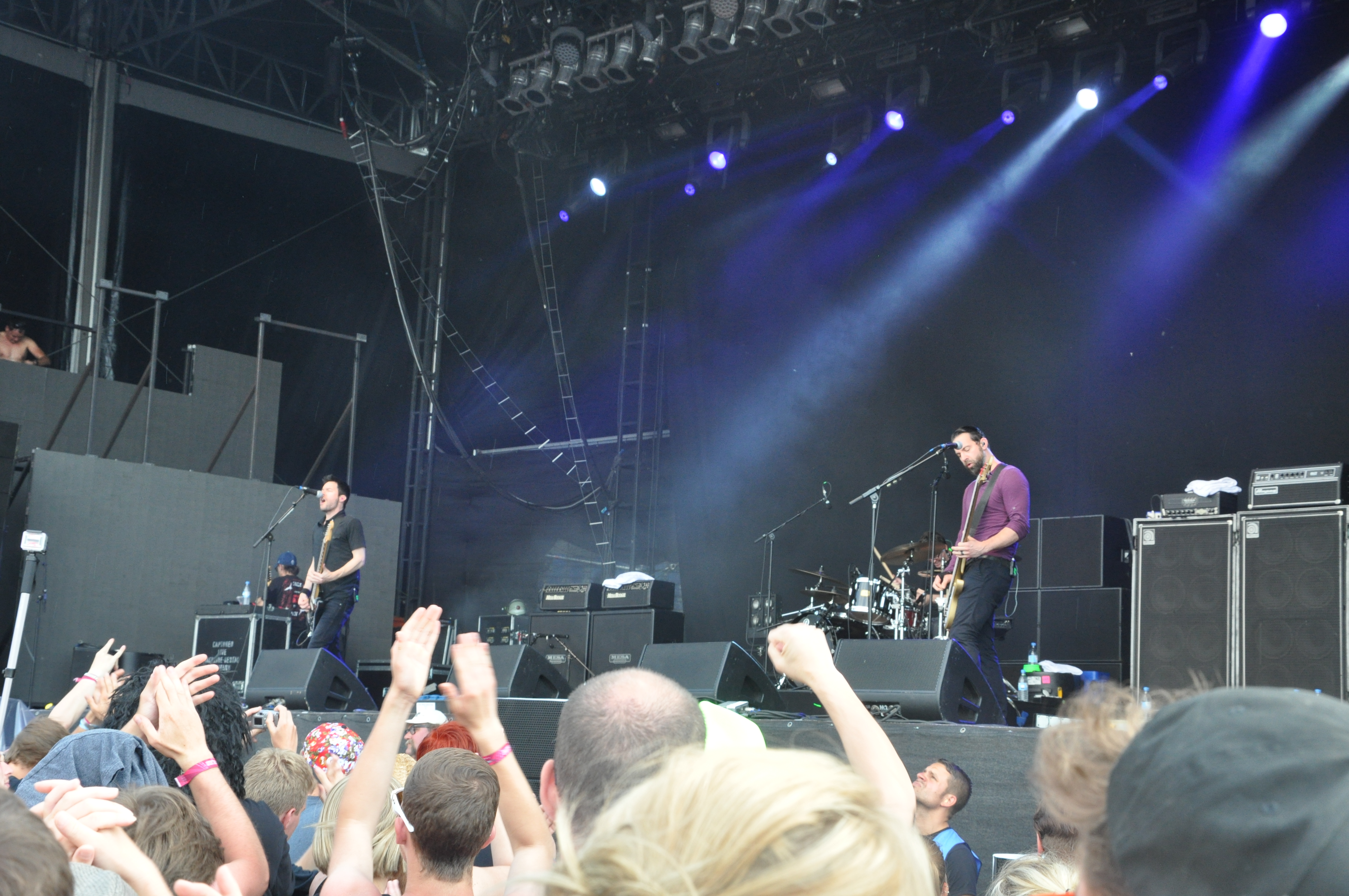
Chevelle performing at Rock am Ring in 2014

In an interview with 105.7 The Point on May 23, 2015, the band stated that after their last show of their tour in St. Louis, they would focus on writing new material, and that future work would be moving in a heavier-sounding direction.

On May 10, 2016, the band announced that their new album would be titled The North Corridor, which was released on July 8, 2016. The first single from the album is "Joyride (Omen)" which became their fifth song to reach No. 1 on the Hot Mainstream Rock Tracks. The others two singles from the album are "Door to Door Cannibals" and "Rivers". In October 2018, Chevelle released a compilation album titled, 12 Bloody Spies, featuring B-sides, covers, rarities, and remixes. On August 1, 2019, the band launched a craft beer in collaboration with Revolution Brewing. The beer the band launched is a German-style Helles Lager and is called La Gárgola named after the band's seventh album. On September 20, 2019, Bernardini announced his departure from the band.

=== NIRATIAS and Bright as Blasphemy (2019–present) ===
In June 2019, the band announced that they entered the studio with long-time producer Joe Barresi. Along with the announcement drummer Sam Loeffler said they have been writing material for a year-and-a-half, meaning the process of making this album has taken longer than usual. In an interview with KCAL 96.7's RadioActive Mike Z. in September 2019, vocalist Pete Loeffler stated:

"We went really dark on the last two [albums], really heavy and more metal. That’s personally where I like to be and I want to live on stage, but this record [Barresi] was like, ‘Let’s try to do some melodic stuff,’ so I went down that road."

On November 8, 2020, the band released an acoustic version of the new song "Endlessly". The band released a music video for their new song, "Self Destructor" on January 8, 2021. The song is the lead single from their upcoming ninth studio album, NIRATIAS (an acronym for "Nothing is real and this is a simulation") which was released on March 5, 2021. On January 29, 2021, the band released the second single from the album, "Peach". On February 19, 2021, the band released the third single from the album, "Remember When". On March 5, 2021, the band released the fourth single from the album, "Endlessly". On March 8, 2021, the band announced that ÆGES guitarist and vocalist, Kemble Walters would be their new touring bassist.

In a March 17, 2021, interview with Loudwire, Pete Loeffler states that despite the band selling over six million albums, they haven't gotten any money out of it. The money all went back to Epic. He blames it on signing a bad contract early on in his career. On May 1, 2021, the band released a music video for the song "Mars Simula". "Self Destructor" was included in the 2021 film, Hitman's Wife's Bodyguard. The band toured in September and November 2021 in promotion of the album, calling the tour, "The NIRATIAS Tour". The November dates were later canceled and the band stated it was due to "changing circumstances beyond our control." In 2022, the band was nominated for Rock Artist of the Year at the iHeartRadio Music Awards.

In April 2022, the band canceled one concert and postponed another due to Sam testing positive for COVID-19. In June 2022, the band announced that they were entering the studio to record their tenth studio album in November or December, with plans of releasing the album in 2023. It will be their first release without a major record label due to their contract with Epic Records ending. In March 2024, it was announced that Chevelle had ten songs recorded for the new album. The band went on a US tour in September 2023 with Three Days Grace and Loathe. In July 2024, the band announced that they signed with a new record label, Alchemy Recordings, and that their tenth album was tentatively due to come out in September or October that year. However, both release dates were missed and the album was delayed to 2025. On March 25, 2025, the band announced a new tour, with supporting acts Asking Alexandria and Dead Poet Society. The tour began in August 2025. The following day, they released the single "Rabbit Hole (Cowards, Pt. 1)".

In an interview with Full Metal Jackie on KLOS' "Whiplash", drummer Sam Loeffler stated that their tenth album was self-produced. He described the process as "The hardest thing we've ever done [and]...probably not worth it, but we did it, and we can say we did it." Their previous long-time producer, Joe Barresi, encouraged the band to self-produce their next album. Barresi produced all of the band's albums since Hats Off to the Bull (2011). Loeffler also stated that the song, "Cowards, Pt. 2", could be the album's second single. On May 14, 2025, a music video for "Rabbit Hole (Cowards, Pt. 1)" was released. On May 28, 2025, the second single, "Jim Jones (Cowards, Pt. 2)" was released, alongside an announcement for the band's tenth studio album, Bright as Blasphemy. The album was released on August 15. The band toured with Dead Poet Society in April 2026.

== Musical style and influences ==
Chevelle has been classified as hard rock, alternative metal, alternative rock, post-grunge, nu metal, progressive metal, and indie rock. (Note: Musical styles: "hard rock"; "alternative metal"; "alternative rock"; "post-grunge"; "nu metal"; "progressive metal"; "indie rock") The band's debut album Point #1 has been described as indie rock. The band's most popular albums, Wonder What's Next and This Type of Thinking (Could Do Us In), are both described as nu metal. Wonder What's Next had been described as having a radio-friendly sound. Albums such as La Gargola and The North Corridor feature a heavier, more riff-oriented sound with lyrical themes influenced by horror. Their ninth studio album NIRATIAS incorporated elements of progressive rock and art rock along with a science-fiction theme.

Their primary musical influences as stated by the band members are Helmet, Tool, and The Cure. Chevelle has frequently been compared to Tool throughout its career. Pete Loeffler's singing voice was stated to sound similar to that of Tool's Maynard James Keenan, and the band's music has been compared to Tool's "soft-loud vocal dynamics." According to Lauren Wise of Phoenix New Times, "[Chevelle have] never strayed far from their controlled chaos and somehow gentle rampage or their mix of dark magnetism and gothic pop (think early Tool meets The Cure if you haven't heard radio-dominating hits like "The Red")."

Despite comparisons to Tool, many critics such as Andree Farias and Andy Argyrakis of Christianity Today have stated Chevelle as having a unique sound to their music. Farias has reviewed Chevelle's first three albums, praising them as "commanding vocals over jolting guitars and chest-thumping bass beats". In discussing the band's sound throughout their career, Raul Stanciu of Sputnikmusic stated, "It amazes me how Chevelle manage to maintain such a consistent output...[they're] always tweaking the overall sound in small amounts, so that you’ll be constantly surprised." Chevelle's music has also been described as "a kind of controlled chaos, a beautiful darkness, a gentle rampage of aural velocity."

== Band members ==
Current members

- Pete Loeffler – lead vocals, guitar (1995–present); bass (2019–present; in studio only)
- Sam Loeffler – drums (1995–present)

Current touring musicians

- Kemble Walters – bass, backing vocals (2021–present)

Former members

- Matt Scott – bass, backing vocals (1995–1996)
- Joe Loeffler – bass, backing vocals (1996–2005)
- Dean Bernardini – bass, backing vocals, additional drums (2005–2019)

Former touring musicians

- Geno Lenardo – bass (2005)
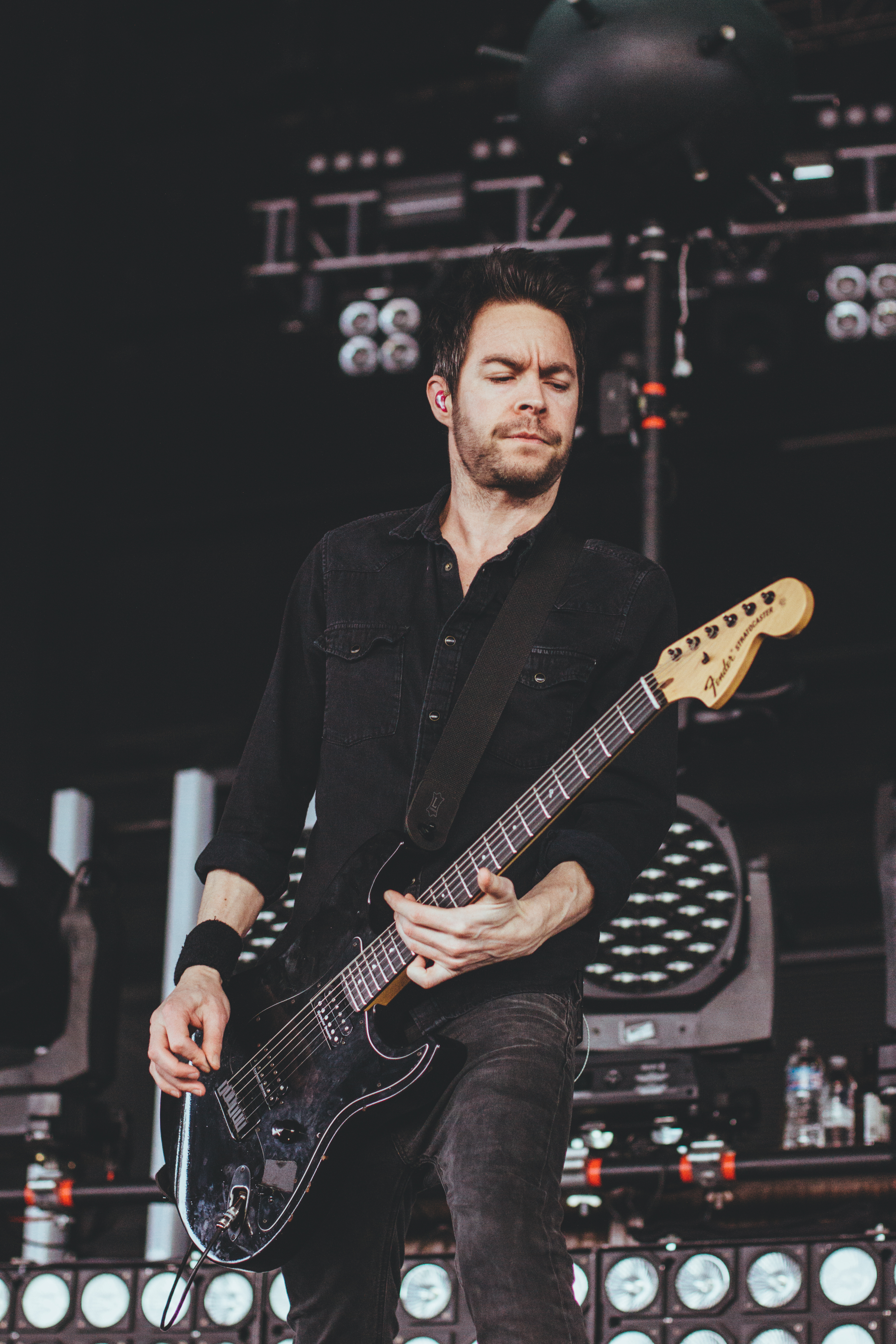
Lead vocalist and guitarist Pete Loeffler

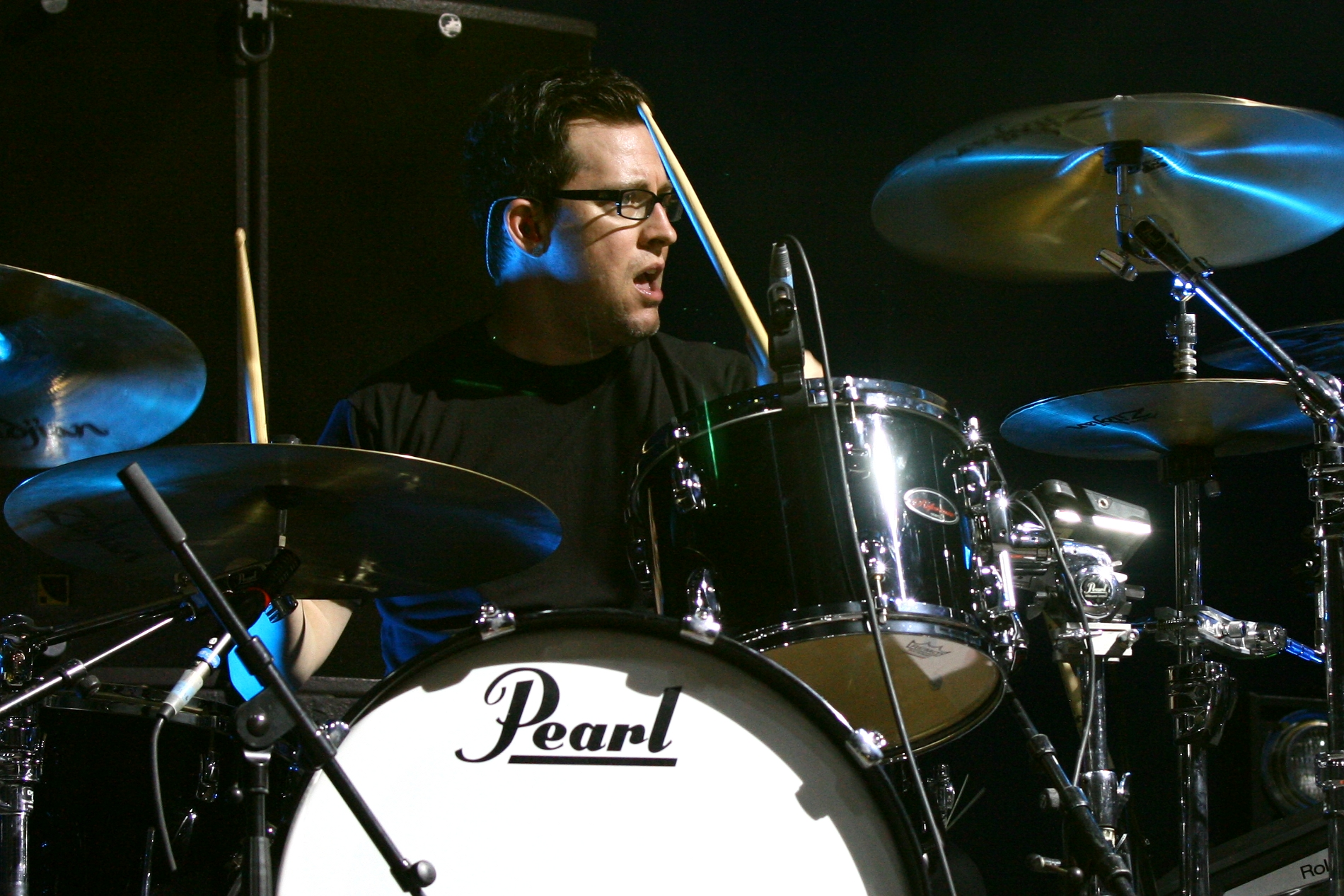
Drummer Sam Loeffler

Timeline

== Discography ==
Studio albums

- Point #1 (1999)
- Wonder What's Next (2002)
- This Type of Thinking (Could Do Us In) (2004)
- Vena Sera (2007)
- Sci-Fi Crimes (2009)
- Hats Off to the Bull (2011)
- La Gárgola (2014)
- The North Corridor (2016)
- NIRATIAS (2021)
- Bright as Blasphemy (2025)

== Awards and nominations ==
=== Billboard Music Awards ===
Year	Nominee / work	Award	Result	Ref.
2003	Chevelle	Modern Rock Artist	Nominated	
2003	"Send the Pain Below"	Modern Rock Track	Nominated	
2003	"Send the Pain Below"	Top Rock Song	Nominated	

=== GMA Dove Awards ===
Year	Nominee / work	Award	Result	Ref.
2000	Point #1	Hard Music Album	Won	
2000	"Mia"	Hard Music Recorded Song	Won	
2001	"Point #1"	Hard Music Recorded Song	Won	

=== iHeartRadio Music Awards ===
Year	Nominee / work	Award	Result	Ref.
2022	Chevelle	Rock Artist of the Year	Nominated	

=== Loudwire Music Awards ===
Year	Nominee / work	Award	Result	Ref.
2012	Chevelle	Rock Band of the Year	Nominated	
2014	Chevelle	Best Rock Band	Nominated	
2014	La Gárgola	Best Rock Album	Nominated	
2014	Dean Bernardini	Best Bassist	Nominated	
2014	"Take Out the Gunman"	Best Rock Song	Nominated	

=== Teen Choice Awards ===
Year	Nominee / work	Award	Result	Ref.
2003	"Send the Pain Below"	Choice Rock Track	Nominated	
