= NIRATIAS =

Studio album by Chevelle
- Released: March 5, 2021
- Recorded: 2019–2020
- Studio: JHOC (Pasadena, California)
- Genres: Alternative metal; hard rock; alternative rock
- Length: 50:36
- Label: Epic
- Producer: Joe Barresi

Chevelle chronology
12 Bloody Spies (2018)	NIRATIAS (2021)	Bright as Blasphemy (2025)

Singles from NIRATIAS
- 1. "Self Destructor" Released: January 8, 2021; 2. "Peach" Released: January 29, 2021; 3. "Remember When" Released: February 19, 2021; 4. "Endlessly" Released: March 5, 2021; 5. "Mars Simula" Released: May 1, 2021

NIRATIAS (an acronym for "Nothing Is Real and This Is a Simulation") is the ninth studio album by the American rock band Chevelle, released on March 5, 2021. It was preceded by four singles: "Self Destructor", "Peach", "Remember When", and "Endlessly". The album was produced by Joe Barresi and was their first studio album in five years, the previous being 2016's The North Corridor. It is also their first album as a two-piece, as bassist Dean Bernardini left the band in late 2019, leaving vocalist Pete Loeffler to play both guitar and bass on the album. It marked the final album on their contract with long-time label Epic Records; future music from the band will be released on Alchemy Records.

Unlike previous Chevelle albums, NIRATIAS is a concept album, with more instrumental and spoken word tracks, dealing with themes such as interstellar travel, mistrust in leadership, loss, and the past.

== Background ==
In June 2019, it was announced that the band entered the studio with producer Joe Barresi, who also produced their last three albums. Drummer Sam Loeffler stated they had been writing material for a year and a half, meaning the writing process of this album has taken longer than their other albums. The band recorded eight songs in 2019 and the other five were finished by March 2020. Speaking about the lyrical direction of the album, vocalist Pete Loeffler stated:

"It has a lot of space to it, a lot of interstellar travel to it. You've got Elon Musk trying to get to Mars and that was completely fascinating to me so when I write lyrics, it's just kind of made its way in there. As you'll see with the cover, it's sort of space themed as well.

Artwork for the album is by Boris Vallejo, also known for designing the posters used for films like Knightriders and National Lampoon's Vacation. The title of the album is an acronym for "Nothing Is Real and This Is a Simulation" Producer Joe Barresi challenged the band to write more melodic songs, as opposed to the darker and heavier material from their past two albums.

About the music on NIRATIAS, Pete said, "It's just more melodic singing over heavy stuff...It's not as much screaming on this album, for sure."

== Release ==
On November 6, 2020, the band uploaded a video stating that their new album has already been completed and was awaiting release. On November 8, 2020, the band released an acoustic version of the new song "Endlessly". The band released a music video for the lead single, "Self Destructor" on January 8, 2021. The album was released on March 5, 2021. On January 25, 2021, the band revealed the track listing. On January 29, 2021, the band released the second single from the album, "Peach". On February 19, 2021, the band released the third single from the album, "Remember When". On March 5, 2021, the band released the fourth single from the album, "Endlessly". On May 1, 2021, the band released a music video for the album's fifth single "Mars Simula". "Self Destructor" is included in the 2021 film, Hitman's Wife's Bodyguard.

== Composition and themes ==
Musically, NIRATIAS has been described as an alternative metal, hard rock, and alternative rock album, which incorporates elements of progressive rock and art rock. It demonstrates science-fiction themes. The opener "Verruckt" is an instrumental song that contains "sludgy stoner-doom metal" riffs. "So Long, Mother Earth" is a song about space exploration and AllMusic compared it to "Tool's dystopian art-metal". The closing track "Lost in Digital Woods" is a spoken word and ambient song. Overall, the album is more melodic and contains less screaming than their last two albums. AllMusic described the album as a "sci-fi fever dream".

== Critical reception ==
Professional ratings
Review scores
Source	Rating
AllMusic	3.5/5 stars
The Spill Magazine	4/5 stars
Sputnikmusic	4/5 stars

James Christopher Monger of AllMusic praised NIRATIAS as a "visceral sci-fi fever dream that pairs tight, caustic riffage with billowing melodic contrails". He criticized the absence of former bassist Dean Bernardini, stating, "It's in these beefier numbers that the absence of Bernardini is felt -- in addition to handling vocals, guitar, and piano, Pete Loeffler was tasked with filling in on bass as well, and while his parts are more than adequate, the paucity of low-end throughout NIRATIAS is hard to ignore."

Gerrod Harris of The Spill Magazine stated, "Chevelle has written the soundtrack warning of the dystopian future that looks more like Blade Runner and Total Recall than we'd like on NIRATIAS. The album ties together a tight recorded performance that sounds larger than life along with strong, unique songwriting that propelled Chevelle forward for just over 20 years." The staff review at Sputnikmusic generally praised the album for being slightly different due to its "interlude-filled tracklist and a sort of unifying theme throughout" though conceded that they were really only "baby steps" towards making a different sounding Chevelle album, hoping that they choose to "branch out more" on their next album.

=== Accolades ===
Publication	Accolade	Rank
Loudwire	The 45 Best Rock + Metal Albums of 2021	26

== Track listing ==
All music is composed by Chevelle.

NIRATIAS track listing
No.	Title	Length
1.	"Verruckt" (instrumental)	3:31
2.	"So Long, Mother Earth"	4:52
3.	"Mars Simula"	4:11
4.	"Sleep the Deep" (instrumental)	1:06
5.	"Self Destructor"	5:47
6.	"Piistol Star (Gravity Heals)"	4:49
7.	"VVurmhole" (instrumental)	0:19
8.	"Peach"	4:16
9.	"Test Test…Enough"	2:08
10.	"Endlessly"	5:14
11.	"Remember When"	4:29
12.	"Ghost and Razor"	5:51
13.	"Lost in Digital Woods"	4:03
Total length:		50:36

== Personnel ==
Credits for NIRATIAS adapted from liner notes.

Chevelle

- Pete Loeffler – vocals, guitar, bass guitar, piano
- Sam Loeffler – drums

Additional musicians

- Brian Kilgore – timpani, chimes, percussion (track 10)
- Joe Barresi – additional percussion

Production

- Joe Barresi – producer, mixing
- Mark "Stig" Daughney – guitar tech
- Dan Druff – guitar tech
- Mike Fasano – drum tech
- Bruce Jacoby – drum tech
- Jun Murakawa – assistant engineer
- Greg Foeller – assistant engineer
- Bob Ludwig – mastering

Artwork

- Jeff Schulz – art direction and design
- Boris Vallejo – cover illustration
- Joseph Cultice – photography

== Charts ==
=== Weekly charts ===
Weekly chart performance for NIRATIAS
Chart (2021)	Peak position
Canadian Albums (Billboard)	68
US Billboard 200	9
US Top Alternative Albums (Billboard)	1
US Top Hard Rock Albums (Billboard)	1
US Top Rock Albums (Billboard)	1

=== Year-end charts ===
Year-end chart performance for NIRATIAS
Chart (2021)	Position
US Top Rock Albums (Billboard)	94
