= Indestructible Tour =

2008–2009 concert tour by Disturbed

- Tour by Disturbed
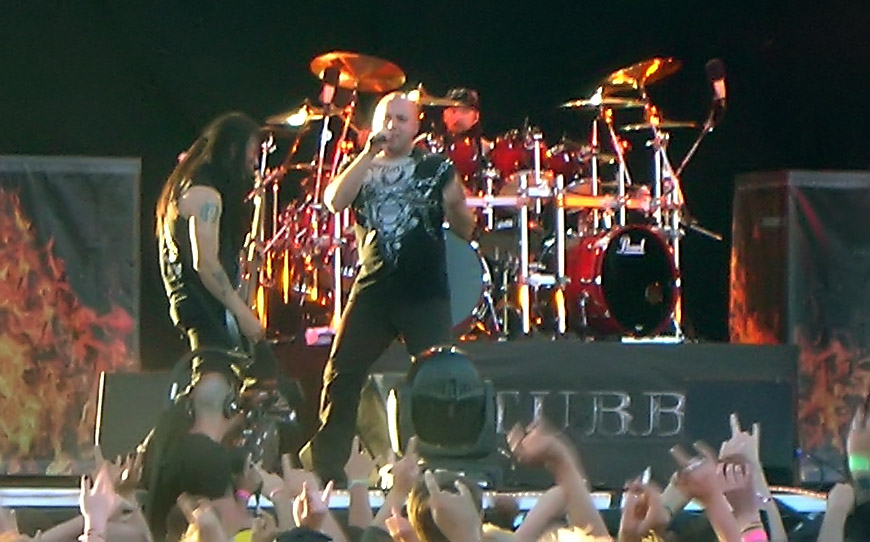
- Disturbed performing at the Sweden Rock Festival in Sölvesborg, Sweden on June 5, 2008.
- Location: Asia; Europe; North America; Oceania
- Associated album: Indestructible
- Start date: April 26, 2008
- End date: July 3, 2009
- Legs: 11
- No. of shows: 187; 137 in North America; 38 in Europe; 9 in Oceania; 3 in Asia; 4 cancellations

Disturbed concert chronology
- Ten Thousand Fists Tour (2005–2006); Indestructible Tour (2008–2009); Asylum Tour (2010–2011)

The Indestructible Tour was a 2008–09 concert tour by American heavy metal band Disturbed in support of the group's fourth studio album, Indestructible, which was released in June 2008.

The tour saw extensive legs throughout the United States, as well as tours in Europe, Canada, Australia, New Zealand, and Japan. A DVD release entitled Indestructible in Germany, which features a portion of the band's performance at the 2008 edition of the Rock am Ring Festival, was released in December 2008 exclusively through electronics retailer Best Buy.

In March 2009, the band began a fourth iteration of their self-created package tour, Music as a Weapon, for U.S. markets. The trek featured acts such as Killswitch Engage, Chimaira, and Lacuna Coil, among others. The final leg took place in Europe in June 2009, beginning in Interlaken, Switzerland and wrapping up in early July in Turku, Finland.

== Tour dates ==
Date	City	Country	Venue
North America, Leg #1
April 26, 2008	Little Rock	United States	Edgefest
April 27, 2008	Wichita	United States	The Cotillion
April 29, 2008	Amarillo	United States	Aztec Music Hall
April 30, 2008	Tulsa	United States	Cain's Ballroom
May 2, 2008	Springfield	United States	Shrine Mosque
May 3, 2008	Memphis	United States	Beale Street Music Festival
May 5, 2008	North Myrtle Beach	United States	House of Blues
May 6, 2008	Knoxville	United States	The Valarium
May 8, 2008	Lake Buena Vista	United States	House of Blues
May 9, 2008	Birmingham	United States	Sloss Furnace
May 11, 2008	Richmond	United States	The National
May 12, 2008	Atlantic City	United States	House of Blues
May 14, 2008	Cincinnati	United States	Bogart's
May 15, 2008	Fort Wayne	United States	Piere's
May 17, 2008	Columbus	United States	Rock on the Range
Europe, Leg #1
June 5, 2008	Sölvesborg	Sweden	Sweden Rock Festival
June 7, 2008	Nürburgring	Germany	Rock am Ring Festival
June 8, 2008	Nuremberg	Germany	Rock im Park Festival
June 10, 2008	Zagreb	Croatia	Boogaloo Club
June 13, 2008	Donington Park	United Kingdom	Download Festival
June 15, 2008	Nickelsdorf	Austria	Nova Rock Festival
Canada ("Heavy MTL")
June 22, 2008	Montreal	Canada	Parc Jean-Drapeau
North America, Leg #2 ("Mayhem Festival")
July 9, 2008	Auburn	United States	White River Amphitheatre
July 12, 2008	Mountain View	United States	Shoreline Amphitheatre
July 13, 2008	San Bernardino	United States	San Manuel Amphitheater
July 14, 2008 ^{[1]}	Wheatland	United States	Sleep Train Amphitheatre
July 15, 2008	Fresno	United States	Save Mart Center
July 16, 2008	Chula Vista	United States	Cricket Wireless Amphitheatre
July 18, 2008	Phoenix	United States	Cricket Wireless Pavilion
July 19, 2008	Albuquerque	United States	Journal Pavilion
July 20, 2008	Greenwood Village	United States	Fiddler's Green Amphitheatre
July 22, 2008	Bonner Springs	United States	Sandstone Amphitheater
July 23, 2008	Maryland Heights	United States	Verizon Wireless Amphitheater
July 25, 2008	Dallas	United States	SuperPages.com Center
July 26, 2008	Selma	United States	Verizon Wireless Amphitheater
July 27, 2008	Houston	United States	Sam Houston Race Park
July 29, 2008	Tampa	United States	Ford Amphitheatre
July 30, 2008	West Palm Beach	United States	Cruzan Amphitheatre
August 1, 2008	Virginia Beach	United States	Verizon Wireless Amphitheater
August 2, 2008	Burgettstown	United States	Post-Gazette Pavilion
August 3, 2008	Scranton	United States	Toyota Pavilion
August 5, 2008	Mansfield	United States	Comcast Center
August 6, 2008	Uniondale	United States	Nassau Coliseum
August 8, 2008	Toronto	Canada	Downsview Park
August 9, 2008	Clarkston	United States	DTE Energy Music Theatre
August 10, 2008	Tinley Park	United States	First Midwest Bank Amphitheatre
August 12, 2008	Atlanta	United States	Lakewood Amphitheatre
August 13, 2008	Noblesville	United States	Verizon Wireless Music Center
August 15, 2008	Camden	United States	Susquehanna Bank Center
August 16, 2008	Hartford	United States	New England Dodge Music Center
August 17, 2008	Bristow	United States	Nissan Pavilion
August 19, 2008	Corfu	United States	Darien Lake Performing Arts Center
Oceania ("Music as a Weapon: Australia and New Zealand")
August 29, 2008	Perth	Australia	Challenge Stadium
August 31, 2008	Adelaide	Australia	Thebarton Theatre
September 2, 2008	Brisbane	Australia	Brisbane Entertainment Centre
September 3, 2008	Sydney	Australia	Hordern Pavilion
September 4, 2008	Newcastle	Australia	Newcastle Entertainment Centre
September 6, 2008	Melbourne	Australia	Festival Hall
September 9, 2008	Auckland	New Zealand	Vector Arena
September 10, 2008	Wellington	New Zealand	TSB Bank Arena
September 12, 2008	Christchurch	New Zealand	Westpac Arena
Asia
September 16, 2008	Osaka	Japan	Club Quattro
September 17, 2008	Tokyo	Japan	Liquid Room
September 18, 2008	Tokyo	Japan	Liquid Room
Europe, Leg #2
October 4, 2008	London	United Kingdom	Carling Academy Brixton
October 6, 2008	Manchester	United Kingdom	Manchester Apollo
October 7, 2008	Glasgow	United Kingdom	Carling Academy
October 8, 2008	Nottingham	United Kingdom	Rock City
October 10, 2008	Birmingham	United Kingdom	Carling Academy
October 11, 2008	Brussels	Belgium	Ancienne Belgique
October 13, 2008	Amsterdam	Netherlands	Heineken Music Hall
October 14, 2008	Hamburg	Germany	Docks
October 15, 2008	Hamburg	Germany	Docks
October 17, 2008	Berlin	Germany	Columbiahalle
October 18, 2008	Düsseldorf	Germany	Philipshalle
October 20, 2008	Munich	Germany	Zenith
October 23, 2008	Vienna	Austria	Gasometer
October 24, 2008	Zürich	Switzerland	Volkshaus
October 26, 2008	Karlsruhe	Germany	Europahalle
October 28, 2008	Copenhagen	Denmark	K.B. Hallen
October 29, 2008	Oslo	Norway	Rockefeller Music Hall
October 31, 2008	Stockholm	Sweden	Arenan
November 2, 2008	Helsinki	Finland	Helsinki Ice Hall
North America, Leg #3
November 23, 2008	Rochester	United States	Mayo Civic Auditorium
November 25, 2008	Brookings	United States	Swiftel Center
November 26, 2008	Bismarck	United States	Civic Center
November 28, 2008	Great Falls	United States	Four Seasons Arena
November 29, 2008	Spokane	United States	Knitting Factory
November 30, 2008	Vancouver	Canada	Queen Elizabeth Theatre
December 2, 2008	Edmonton	Canada	Shaw Conference Centre
December 3, 2008	Calgary	Canada	Stampede Corral
December 5, 2008	Saskatoon	Canada	Prairieland Hall
December 6, 2008	Winnipeg	Canada	Burton Cummings Theatre
December 8, 2008	Grand Forks	United States	Alerus Center
December 10, 2008	Kearney	United States	FirsTier Event Center
December 12, 2008	Nashville	United States	Sommet Center
December 15, 2008	Indianapolis	United States	Murat Egyptian Room
December 16, 2008	St. Louis	United States	The Pageant
North America, Leg #4
January 16, 2009	Milwaukee	United States	Eagles Ballroom
January 17, 2009	Springfield	United States	Shrine Mosque
January 19, 2009	Kansas City	United States	Uptown Theater
January 21, 2009	Magna	United States	The Great Saltair
January 23, 2009	Everett	United States	Comcast Arena
January 24, 2009	Kennewick	United States	Toyota Center
January 26, 2009	Sacramento	United States	ARCO Arena
January 27, 2009	San Jose	United States	Event Center Arena
January 29, 2009	Los Angeles	United States	Hollywood Palladium
January 30, 2009	Las Vegas	United States	Pearl Concert Theater
February 2, 2009	El Paso	United States	El Paso County Coliseum
February 3, 2009	Belton	United States	Bell County Expo Center
February 5, 2009	Midland	United States	Horseshoe Arena
February 6, 2009	Corpus Christi	United States	Concrete Street Amphitheater
February 10, 2009	Tupelo	United States	BancorpSouth Arena
February 11, 2009	Augusta	United States	James Brown Arena
February 13, 2009	Jacksonville	United States	Morocco Shrine Auditorium
February 14, 2009	Fort Lauderdale	United States	Pompano Beach Amphitheater
February 16, 2009	Estero	United States	Germain Arena
February 18, 2009	North Myrtle Beach	United States	House of Blues
February 19, 2009	Johnson City	United States	Freedom Hall Civic Center
February 21, 2009	Rochester	United States	Main Street Armory
February 22, 2009	Atlantic City	United States	House of Blues
February 24, 2009	Trotwood	United States	Hara Arena
February 25, 2009	Huntington	United States	Big Sandy Superstore Arena
February 27, 2009	Utica	United States	Utica Memorial Auditorium
February 28, 2009	Scranton	United States	Scranton Cultural Center
North America, Leg #5 ("Music as a Weapon IV")
March 21, 2009	Waterloo	United States	McElroy Auditorium
March 23, 2009	Oklahoma City	United States	Ford Center
March 25, 2009	Denver	United States	Fillmore Auditorium
March 26, 2009	Denver	United States	Fillmore Auditorium
March 28, 2009	Glendale	United States	Jobing.com Arena
March 29, 2009	Albuquerque	United States	Tingley Coliseum
March 31, 2009	Grand Prairie	United States	Nokia Theatre at Grand Prairie
April 1, 2009	Park City	United States	Hartman Arena
April 3, 2009	Bossier City	United States	CenturyTel Center
April 4, 2009	Little Rock	United States	Riverfest Amphitheater
April 5, 2009	New Orleans	United States	Lakefront Arena
April 7, 2009	Pensacola	United States	Civic Center
April 8, 2009	Duluth	United States	Arena at Gwinnett Center
April 10, 2009 ^{[2]}	Tampa	United States	St. Pete Times Forum
April 11, 2009	Orlando	United States	Amway Arena
April 13, 2009	Charlotte	United States	Bojangles' Coliseum
April 14, 2009	Baltimore	United States	1st Mariner Arena
April 15, 2009	Lowell	United States	Paul E. Tsongas Arena
April 17, 2009	State College	United States	Bryce Jordan Center
April 18, 2009	Portland	United States	Cumberland County Civic Center
April 20, 2009	Erie	United States	Louis J. Tullio Arena
April 21, 2009	Bridgeport	United States	Arena at Harbor Yard
April 22, 2009	East Rutherford	United States	Izod Center
April 24, 2009	Fayetteville	United States	Cumberland County Crown Coliseum
April 25, 2009	Reading	United States	Sovereign Center
April 27, 2009	Glens Falls	United States	Glens Falls Civic Center
April 28, 2009	Pittsburgh	United States	Rostraver Ice Garden
April 30, 2009	Battle Creek	United States	Kellogg Arena
May 2, 2009	Detroit	United States	Cobo Arena
May 3, 2009	Cleveland	United States	Time Warner Cable Amphitheater
May 4, 2009	Columbus	United States	Lifestyle Communities Pavilion
May 6, 2009	Peoria	United States	Peoria Civic Center
May 8, 2009	Minneapolis	United States	Target Center
May 9, 2009	West Des Moines	United States	Val Air Ballroom
May 10, 2009 ^{[3]}	Madison	United States	Veterans Memorial Coliseum
May 12, 2009	La Crosse	United States	La Crosse Center
May 13, 2009	Evansville	United States	Roberts Municipal Stadium
May 15, 2009	Council Bluffs	United States	Mid-America Center
May 16, 2009	Chicago	United States	Charter One Pavilion
May 17, 2009 ^{[4]}	Ashwaubenon	United States	Resch Center
May 23, 2009 ^{[2]}	Noblesville	United States	Verizon Wireless Music Center
May 25, 2009 ^{[2]}	London	Canada	John Labatt Centre
May 26, 2009 ^{[2]}	Toronto	Canada	Sound Academy
May 27, 2009 ^{[2]}	Montreal	Canada	Bell Centre
May 29, 2009 ^{[2]}	Moncton	Canada	Moncton Coliseum
May 30, 2009 ^{[2]}	Halifax	Canada	Halifax Forum
June 1, 2009 ^{[2]}	Quebec City	Canada	L'Agora du Vieux-Port
June 2, 2009 ^{[2]}	Ottawa	Canada	Scotiabank Place
June 3, 2009 ^{[2]}	Hamilton	Canada	Copps Coliseum
Europe, Leg #3
June 14, 2009	Interlaken	Switzerland	Greenfield Festival
June 16, 2009	Milan	Italy	Alcatraz
June 17, 2009	Zagreb	Croatia	Boogaloo Club
June 19, 2009	Nickelsdorf	Austria	Nova Rock Festival
June 20, 2009	Neuhausen ob Eck	Germany	Southside Festival
June 21, 2009	Scheeßel	Germany	Hurricane Festival
June 23, 2009	Prague	Czech Republic	Roxy
June 25, 2009	Arendal	Norway	Hove Festival
June 26, 2009	Gothenburg	Sweden	Metaltown Festival
June 28, 2009	Dessel	Belgium	Graspop Metal Meeting Festival
June 29, 2009	Luxembourg	Luxembourg	Den Atelier
June 30, 2009	Tilburg	Netherlands	013
July 3, 2009	Turku	Finland	Ruisrock Festival

- 1 Rescheduled from July 10, 2009.
- 2 Headline show; non-Music as a Weapon date.
- 3 Rescheduled from March 20, 2009.
- 4 Rescheduled from May 10, 2009.

== Canceled dates ==
Date	City	Country	Venue	R
June 18, 2008	Milan	Italy	Alcatraz	[a]
June 19, 2008	Zürich	Switzerland	Rohstofflager	[a]
June 22, 2008	Biddinghuizen	Netherlands	Fields of Rock	[b]
October 21, 2008	Leipzig	Germany	Haus Auensee	[c]

- a Dates canceled due to "routing problems".
- b Festival canceled due to poor ticket sales and the organisers' inability to secure additional appearances by headliner-level acts.
- c Date canceled due to "unforeseen circumstances".

== Support acts ==
- All That Remains (May 25–June 3, 2009)
- Alter Bridge (August 29–September 12, 2008)
- Art of Dying (April 27–May 15, 2008; November 23–December 16, 2008; May 25–June 3, 2009)
- Behind Crimson Eyes (August 29–September 6, 2008)
- Chimaira (March 21–May 17, 2009)
- Egypt Central (November 23–December 16, 2008)
- Five Finger Death Punch (April 27–May 15, 2008)
- Killswitch Engage (March 21–May 17, 2009)
- Lacuna Coil (March 21–May 17, 2009)
- P.O.D. (September 2–12, 2008)
- Redline (September 9–12, 2008)
- Sevendust (January 17–February 28, 2009)
- Shinedown (October 4–November 2, 2008; May 23, 2009)
- Skindred (January 16–February 28, 2009; May 25–June 3, 2009)
- Spineshank (March 21–May 17, 2009)
- Staind (April 10, 2009)
- Static-X (April 10, 2009)
- Suicide Silence (March 29–May 17, 2009)

== Personnel ==
- David Draiman – lead vocals
- Dan Donegan – guitars
- John Moyer – bass guitar, backing vocals
- Mike Wengren – drums
