= Bright as Blasphemy =

Studio album by Chevelle
- Released: August 15, 2025
- Recorded: 2022–2025
- Genres: Alternative metal; hard rock; alternative rock
- Length: 39:27
- Label: Alchemy Recordings
- Producer: Pete Loeffler

Chevelle chronology
NIRATIAS (2021)	Bright as Blasphemy (2025)

Singles from Bright as Blasphemy
- 1. "Rabbit Hole (Cowards, Pt. 1)" Released: March 25, 2025; 2. "Jim Jones (Cowards, Pt. 2)" Released: May 28, 2025; 3. "Pale Horse" Released: August 14, 2025

Bright as Blasphemy is the tenth studio album by the American rock band Chevelle, released on August 15, 2025, through Alchemy Recordings. It marks the band's first album since 2021's NIRATIAS and their first release following their departure from Epic Records. It is the band’s shortest album in length and tracks and the only Chevelle record solely produced by Pete Loeffler.

== Background ==
In June 2022, Chevelle announced that they had plans to record their tenth studio album in November or December, and release the album in 2023. In multiple interviews, drummer Sam Loeffler described the writing process as "torturous," comparing it to "pulling your hair out and then trying to put it back in." The album was self-produced by Pete and Sam Loeffler, marking a departure from their longtime collaboration with Joe Barresi producing their albums, with touring bassist Kemble Walters assisting in engineering.

In July 2024, Chevelle signed with Alchemy Recordings, a new label founded by Danny Wimmer and Dino Paredes. This move was seen as a return to a more independent and collaborative atmosphere, with the band citing a positive and musician-focused environment. The band also announced plans to release the album in September or October 2024. The album was later delayed to 2025.

== Composition ==
Musically, Bright as Blasphemy has been described as alternative metal, hard rock, and alternative rock.

== Release and promotion ==
The album's lead single, "Rabbit Hole (Cowards, Pt. 1)", was released on March 25, 2025. A music video was released on May 14. The second single, "Jim Jones (Cowards, Pt. 2)", followed on May 28. On the same day, the band officially revealed the album's title and release date of August 15, 2025.

To support the album, Chevelle embarked on a 38-date North American headlining tour that began on August 7, 2025, with support from Asking Alexandria and Dead Poet Society, and that concluded on October 2.

== Critical reception ==
Professional ratings
Review scores
Source	Rating
AllMusic	3.5/5 stars
Kerrang!	2/5
New Noise Magazine	4/5 stars
Sputnikmusic	3.5/5

AllMusic wrote, "Bright as Blasphemy sees Chevelle deliver a pithy nine-song set that pairs the band's signature blend of punchy, melodic hard rock and gritty metal with lyrics rooted in the existential angst of the digital age." In a mixed to negative review, Steve Beebee of Kerrang! wrote, "There’s poise here...but it’s as if Chevelle can’t work out how to make their weapons fire, or to put it more bluntly, figure out a tune...the duo’s music has sizable jaws but needs way sharper teeth." In a more positive review, Lamar Ramos of New Noise Magazine stated, "Bright as Blasphemy isn’t a reinvention so much as a refinement: a veteran band taking stock of their strengths, pushing the edges of their sound without losing the punch that made them a fixture in American rock." Simon K. of Sputnikmusic wrote, "There’s nothing on Bright as Blasphemy that’s earth-shattering, but it is all well-refined stuff that...makes it one of the strongest releases in their catalogue."

== Track listing ==
All music is composed by Chevelle.

Bright as Blasphemy track listing
No.	Title	Length
1.	"Pale Horse"	4:37
2.	"Rabbit Hole (Cowards, Pt. 1)"	4:09
3.	"Jim Jones (Cowards, Pt. 2)"	5:09
4.	"Hallucinations"	4:22
5.	"Wolves (Love & Light)"	4:43
6.	"Karma Goddess"	4:11
7.	"Blood Out in the Fields"	3:34
8.	"AI Phobias"	3:47
9.	"Shocked at the End of the World"	4:55
Total length:		39:27

== Personnel ==
Credits adapted from Tidal.

Chevelle

- Pete Loeffler – vocals, guitar, production (all tracks); bass (tracks 3, 5, 6, 7, 9)
- Sam Loeffler – drums

Additional personnel

- Kemble Walters – engineering (all tracks), bass (1, 2, 4, 8, 9)
- Beau Burchell – mixing
- Mike Kalajian – mastering

Technical

- Kevin Moore (Mindreader) - Art Direction & Design
- Tegan Klein - Photography
- Amanda Noelle - Cover Model

== Charts ==
Chart performance for Bright as Blasphemy
Chart (2025)	Peak position
Swiss Albums (Schweizer Hitparade)	91
UK Independent Albums Breakers (OCC)	14
US Billboard 200	150
US Independent Albums (Billboard)	22
US Top Rock & Alternative Albums (Billboard)	32
