= Self Destructor =

Single by Chevelle

from the album NIRATIAS
- Released: January 8, 2021
- Length: 5:47
- Label: Epic
- Songwriters: Pete Loeffler; Sam Loeffler
- Producer: Joe Barresi

Chevelle singles chronology
"In Debt to the Earth" (2018)	"Self Destructor" (2021)	"Peach" (2021)

Music video
- "Self Destructor" on YouTube

"Self Destructor" is a song by American rock band Chevelle. The song was released as the lead single from the band's ninth studio album NIRATIAS. The single reached no. 1 on the Billboard Mainstream Rock chart, becoming the band's sixth song to do so, and 35th on the Billboard Alternative Airplay chart. This track is included in the 2021 film, Hitman's Wife's Bodyguard. James LaBrie of Dream Theater called it his favorite song of 2021.

== Composition ==
In an interview with Loudwire, frontman Pete Loeffler stated that the song was written in 2019 and is about science deniers.

== Track listing ==
No.	Title	Length
1.	"Self Destructor"	5:47

== Charts ==
=== Weekly charts ===
Weekly chart performance for "Self Destructor"
Chart (2021)	Peak position
Canada Rock (Billboard)	49
US Hot Rock & Alternative Songs (Billboard)	28
US Rock & Alternative Airplay (Billboard)	9

=== Year-end charts ===
Year-end chart performance for "Self Destructor"
Chart (2021)	Position
US Rock Airplay (Billboard)	41
