= Hats Off to the Bull =

Studio album by Chevelle
- Released: December 6, 2011
- Studio: JHOC (Pasadena, California)
- Genres: Hard rock; post-grunge; alternative rock; progressive rock
- Length: 42:49
- Label: Epic
- Producer: Joe Barresi

Chevelle chronology
Sci-Fi Crimes (2009)	Hats Off to the Bull (2011)	Stray Arrows: A Collection of Favorites (2012)

Singles from Hats Off to the Bull
- 1. "Face to the Floor" Released: October 10, 2011; 2. "Hats Off to the Bull" Released: February 16, 2012; 3. "Same Old Trip" Released: July 24, 2012

Hats Off to the Bull is the sixth studio album by the American rock band Chevelle, released on December 6, 2011.

"Face to the Floor", was released as a single on October 10, 2011. "Hats Off to the Bull" was released on February 16, 2012. On November 29, 2011 Hats Off to the Bull was premiered on Revolver magazine. On November 30, 2011, "Same Old Trip" was premiered on Noisecreep.

Hats Off to the Bull has sold 239,000 copies in the US.

== Background ==
Pete Loeffler, when talking about the album in an interview with Artistdirect, cited his difficulty when writing saying he read a lot of books and went on to cite Billy Corgan of The Smashing Pumpkins as an example of getting away from music when hitting a wall, quoted saying "I'm constantly rewriting them and trying not to rhyme too much." He also stated that the song "Clones" touches on the criticism that the band sounds too much like the band Tool, but going on to say it's about "getting shit from peers and people saying that you're ripping somebody else off" and that the song goes back to his youth as well as one other track.

The band also stated that "Clones" felt like it belonged on Point #1, questioning if it was a negative or positive direction.

In the interview with Artistdirect.com, Pete also said that he and Bernardini were on a "Stanley Kubrick kick", noting The Shining as one of the movies they'd record and watch at the end of the night on the tour bus, but marked that he found a humor to it and that he had also watched all the Star Trek movies back-to-back.

The album's title comes from Pete's disgust at bullfighting. He explains "It's such a heartless sport and it's so torturous for these animals ... We got the idea of rooting for the bull instead. We root for the underdog."

== Release ==
The first single, "Face to the Floor", was released on October 10, 2011. On February 16, 2012, Chevelle made it official that "Hats Off to the Bull" would be the second single this album. On November 29, 2011 Hats Off to the Bull was premiered on Revolver magazine. On November 30, 2011, "Same Old Trip" was premiered on Noisecreep. The album was released on December 6, 2011.

== Composition ==
Hats Off to the Bull has been described as hard rock, post-grunge, alternative rock, and progressive rock.

== Critical reception ==
Professional ratings
Review scores
Source	Rating
AllMusic	4/5 stars
The A.V. Club	C−
Loudwire	4/5 stars
PopMatters	7/10
Sputnikmusic	3.0/5
Ultimate Guitar	7.3/10

Hats Off to the Bull received generally positive reviews from critics. AllMusic reviewer Gregory Heaney said, "Heavy and dramatic, the album is packed full of tightly coiled, muscular riffs, giving the album a controlled feeling more like a slow burn than an explosive, cathartic release."

In About.com's article for their Best Rock Albums of 2011, in which Hats Off to the Bull placed sixth, author Tim Grierson said, "Chevelle have yet to turn into mature, reflective balladeers -- and that's a very good thing. With Hats Off to the Bull, the Chicago trio continue to deliver on-point rockers full of snarling nastiness. Taut and lean, catchy and mean, these 11 tracks expertly deliver their payload in four concise, punishing minutes of superb guitar rock."

PopMatters reviewer Pete Crigler said, "On Hats Off to the Bull, Chevelle’s sixth album, they return to their roots with the amazingly heavy first single, "Face to the Floor", which has already become one of their biggest hits. Built on an amazing riff, the song sounds just like Chevelle of 2002, and in this day and age, that's something that's perfectly acceptable to listen to."

Sputnikmusic reviewer Xenophanes said, "Hats Off to the Bull, like all Chevelle records, is truly a solid album if there ever was one. It opens up with the heavy hitter, 'Face to the Floor', and largely keeps the energy flowing from there. Chevelle's sixth proper full-length is a well-produced and overall very enjoyable rock album. However, the band is starting to show age in their formula, making Hats Off to the Bull feel like it's been down a very, very well-traveled path."

== Track listing ==
All lyrics are written by Pete Loeffler; all music is composed by Pete Loeffler, Sam Loeffler and Dean Bernardini

No.	Title	Length
1.	"Face to the Floor"	3:38
2.	"Same Old Trip"	3:09
3.	"Ruse"	4:39
4.	"The Meddler"	4:13
5.	"Piñata"	3:54
6.	"Envy"	4:19
7.	"Hats Off to the Bull"	3:55
8.	"Arise"	4:25
9.	"Revenge"	3:30
10.	"Prima Donna"	3:40
11.	"Clones"	3:27
Total length:		42:49

iTunes bonus track
No.	Title	Length
12.	"Indifference"	2:09
Total length:		44:58

Best Buy bonus tracks
No.	Title	Length
12.	"Glimpse of the Con"	5:59
13.	"Still Running (Live at the Metro)"	3:50
Total length:		52:38

== Personnel ==
- Pete Loeffler – vocals, guitar
- Sam Loeffler – drums
- Dean Bernardini – bass, organ on "Prima Donna" and "Envy", additional drums on "Envy"
- Natalie Bernardini – backing vocals on "Same Old Trip"
- Joe Barresi – co-producer, engineer, mixer
- Chevelle – co-producer
- William Albert Allard – album cover
- Jun Murakawa – assistant engineer
- Ted Jensen – mastering
- Dave Collins – mastering

== Charts ==
=== Weekly charts ===
Chart (2011)	Peak position
US Billboard 200	20
US Top Alternative Albums (Billboard)	5
US Digital Albums (Billboard)	7
US Top Hard Rock Albums (Billboard)	3
US Top Rock Albums (Billboard)	5
US Indie Store Album Sales (Billboard)	15

=== Year-end charts ===
Chart (2012)	Position
US Billboard 200	173
US Top Rock Albums (Billboard)	50
New Zealand Albums (RMNZ)	36
