= Closure (Chevelle song) =

Single by Chevelle

from the album Wonder What's Next
- Released: September 1, 2003
- Length: 4:12
- Label: Epic
- Songwriters: Pete Loeffler; Sam Loeffler; Joe Loeffler
- Producer: GGGarth

Chevelle singles chronology
"Send the Pain Below" (2003)	"Closure" (2003)	"Vitamin R (Leading Us Along)" (2004)

Music video
- "Closure" on YouTube

"Closure" is a song by American rock band Chevelle, released as the third and last single from the band's second album, Wonder What's Next. It has a dark, melodic verse that carries into a similarly melodic chorus ending in heavy guitar chords. The following verse continues with added aggression into the second chorus and heavy bridge.

A music video was produced for "Closure". It consists entirely of live performance footage.

The song was briefly covered by Breaking Benjamin in 2004 and 2005.

== Charts ==
=== Weekly charts ===
Weekly chart performance for "Closure"
Chart (2004)	Peak position
US Bubbling Under Hot 100 (Billboard)	20
US Alternative Airplay (Billboard)	11
US Mainstream Rock (Billboard)	17

=== Year-end charts ===
Year-end chart performance for "Closure"
Chart (2004)	Position
US Modern Rock Tracks (Billboard)	54
