= Revolution Brewing =

Brewery in Chicago, Illinois

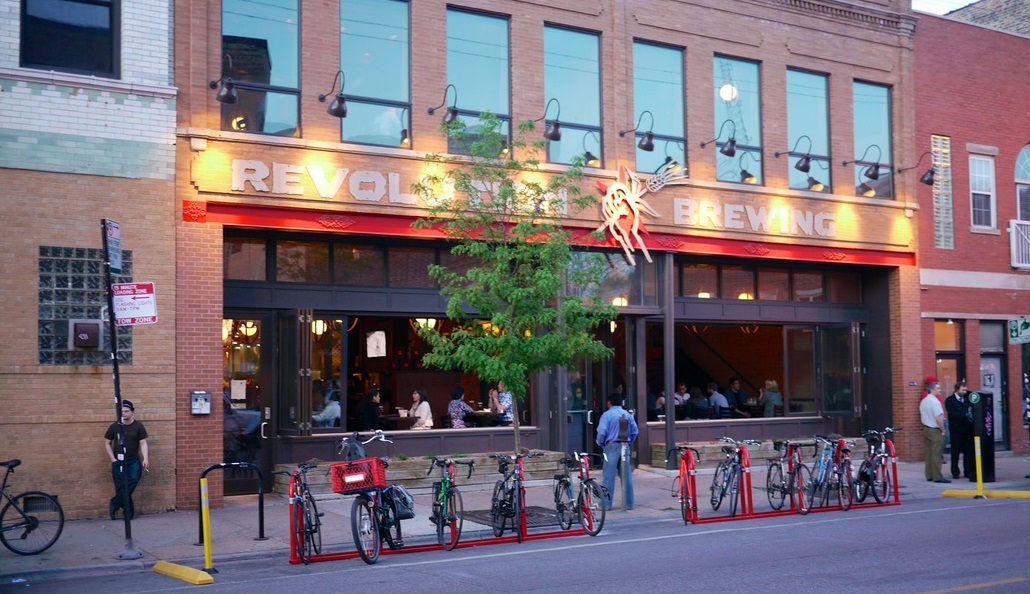
- The original Milwaukee Avenue brewpub in 2013; it closed in December 2024.
- Industry: brewing industry
- Founded: 2010
- Founder: Josh Deth
- Headquarters: Chicago, Illinois, United States
- Key people: Josh Deth (founder/CEO); Jim Cibak (brewmaster); Doug Veliky (chief strategy officer)
- Website: revbrew.com

Revolution Brewing is a brewery in Chicago, Illinois. It was founded as a brewpub in 2010 on Milwaukee Avenue in the Logan Square neighborhood; the brewpub closed in December 2024. A separate production brewery, with canning and bottling lines and a tap room, opened in 2012 about a mile from the brewpub, on Kedzie Avenue in the Avondale neighborhood.

Revolution has received local and national recognition, including awards from the Great American Beer Festival, the World Beer Cup, and Time Out Chicago. The 2013 film Drinking Buddies, starring Olivia Wilde and Jake Johnson, was partly filmed at the brewery.

== History ==
Revolution Brewing was started as a brewpub in 2010 by owner Josh Deth. Deth attended the University of Michigan and became interested in brewing from his frequent visits to Bell's Brewery. Deth worked at Goose Island Brewery and connected with head brewmaster Jim Cibak during his time there. Cibak has worked at a number of breweries including Three Floyds Brewing.

Revolution Brewing has received local and national recognition with awards from the Great American Beer Festival, World Beer Cup, and Time Out Chicago.

The film Drinking Buddies is partly set in the Revolution Brewing brewery and taphouse. A romantic comedy-drama, written and directed by Joe Swanberg, it was shot in 2012 and released in 2013. It stars Olivia Wilde, Jake Johnson, Anna Kendrick, and Ron Livingston. In the movie, the fictional characters portrayed by Wilde and Johnson work at the brewery.

In 2024, Revolution ranked 36th among the Brewers Association's Top 50 U.S. craft brewing companies by beer volume. The original Milwaukee Avenue brewpub closed permanently on December 14, 2024, after nearly 15 years in operation, consolidating the company's operations at its Kedzie Avenue production facility and taproom in Avondale.

== Beers ==
Revolution Brewing produces more than 20 different beers. Some of them are available year-round, and others are seasonal. There are also several dozen more beers that were brewed at different times in the past. As of August 2026, the brewery organizes its current lineup into several families, including Hero IPA-branded India pale ales, the Cold Time line of lagers, City Series session beers, seasonal and small-batch releases, and the barrel-aged Deep Wood Series; several earlier flagship beers, including two of its award-winning releases, have since been discontinued.

Revolution Brewing Beers
Name	Style	ABV %	IBU	Notes
Anti-Hero	India pale ale	6.7	65	Year-round
Hazy-Hero	Hazy India pale ale	7.3	35	Year-round
Fist City	American Pale Ale	5.5	45	Year-round
Rev Pils	German-style pilsner	5.5	45	Year-round
Cold Time	Premium lager	4.8	15	Year-round
Bottom Up Wit	Belgian-style white ale	5.0		Limited release
Coup D'État	French-style saison	7.6		Limited release
TV Party	Rye India pale ale	7.3		Limited release
Red Skull	Imperial red ale	9.3	60	Limited release
Rosa	Fruit ale	5.8		Limited release; hibiscus
A Little Crazy	Belgo-style pale ale	6.8	35	Seasonal
Oktoberfest	German-style Oktoberfest	5.7	25	Seasonal
Fistmas	Holiday ale	6.5	31	Seasonal
Straight Jacket	Barley wine	15		Barrel-aged; limited release
Deth's Tar	Imperial oatmeal stout	14.8		Barrel-aged; limited release
Eugene Porter	Robust porter	6.8	28	Discontinued
Double Fist	Double pale ale	8.9	90	Discontinued
Cross of Gold	Golden ale	4.8	25	Discontinued
Mad Cow	Milk stout	7.0	30	Discontinued
Mother of Exiles	German-style pilsner	5.2	30	Discontinued
Galaxy Hero	India pale ale	6.6		Discontinued; succeeded by the small-batch DDH Galaxy-Hero
Crystal Hero	India pale ale	7.2	75	Discontinued
Local Hero	India pale ale	7.5	65	Discontinued
Jukebox Hero	Black India pale ale	7.4	75	Discontinued
4th Year Beer	Belgian-style quadrupel	11.5	32	Discontinued
Rise	Stout	7.6	55	Discontinued
Repo Man	Rye stout	6.4	30	Discontinued
Very Mad Cow	Milk stout	9.7	30	Discontinued; barrel-aged
Mean Gene	Porter	8.5		Discontinued; barrel-aged
Bean Gene	Porter with coffee	9	28	Discontinued; barrel-aged

== Awards ==
Revolution Brewing awards and recognition
Year	Award	Category	Beer	Result
2025	World Beer Cup	Wood- and Barrel-Aged Strong Stout	Deth's Tar	Bronze
2025	United States Beer Tasting Championship	Imperial Hazy IPA (Midwest Regional)	X-Hero Juicy Rush	Regional Champion
2024	Brewers Association	Top 50 U.S. Craft Brewing Companies by beer volume	—	36th place
2024	United States Beer Tasting Championship	Wood/Barrel-Aged Beer (Grand National)	Straight Jacket	Champion
2024	United States Beer Tasting Championship	IPA (Midwest Regional)	Anti-Hero	Regional Champion
2024	World Beer Championships (Beverage Testing Institute)	Beer of the Year	Straight Jacket	Won
2023	United States Beer Tasting Championship	Bourbon Barrel-Aged Stout/Porter (Grand National)	Deth's Tar	Champion
2023	United States Beer Tasting Championship	IPA (Grand National)	Anti-Hero	Champion
2022	Chicago Tribune Readers' Choice Food Awards	Best Bar Food	—	Won
2022	United States Beer Tasting Championship	Multigrain Beer (Grand National)	V.S.O.R.	Champion
2022	European Beer Star Awards	Wood and Barrel Aged Strong Beer	Straight Jacket	Silver
2021	Chicago Reader Best of Chicago	Best Local Beer	—	Won
2021	Chicago Reader Best of Chicago	Best Local Brewery	—	Won
2021	European Beer Star Awards	Strong Porter	—	Gold
2020	Chicago Reader Best of Chicago	Best Local Beer	—	Won
2020	Chicago Reader Best of Chicago	Best Local Brewery	—	Won
2019	Chicago Reader Best of Chicago	Best Brewery	—	Won
2018	Great American Beer Festival	Wood- and Barrel-Aged Strong Beer	Straight Jacket	Bronze
2017	Brewers Association	Top 50 Craft Brewery	—	40th place
2017	Brewers Association	Top 50 Overall Brewery	—	50th place
2016	Chicago magazine	Best Craft Brewery (Readers' Choice)	—	Won
2016	Brewers Association	Top 50 Craft Brewery Companies	—	46th place
2016	World Beer Cup	Other Strong Beer	Winter Woman	Bronze
2015	Brewers Association	Top 50 Craft Brewery Companies	—	50th place
2015	Chicago magazine / Chicago Reader Best of Chicago	Best Craft Brewery / Best Local Brewery (Readers' Choice)	—	Won
2014	Chicago magazine Best of Chicago	Best Craft Brewery (Readers' Choice)	—	Won
2014	Chicago magazine Best of Chicago	Best Beer (Readers' Choice)	Anti-Hero	Won
2013	Chicagoist	Beer of the Week	A Little Crazy	Won
2013	Time Out Chicago 2013 Eat Out Awards	Best Chicago Microbrewery	—	Won
2013	Chicagoland Brewpub & Microbrewery Shootout	Best Food/Beer Pairing	—	1st place
2013	Chicago Tribune Dining Awards	Beverage Maker of the Year	—	Won
2012	Great American Beer Festival	English-Style Summer Ale	Cross of Gold	Gold
2012	Great American Beer Festival	American-Belgo-Style Ale	A Little Crazy	Bronze
2012	Chicago Reader Best of Chicago (Readers' Poll)	Best Brewpub	—	Won
2012	Chicago Reader Best of Chicago (Readers' Poll)	Best Pub Grub	—	Won
2012	World Beer Cup	American Style Stout	Rise	Gold
2012	World Beer Cup	English Style Summer Ale	Cross of Gold	Gold
2012	Chicago Beer Society's 35th Annual Fall Tasting	Hoppy, American Stout	Rise	1st place (tie)
2012	RateBeer	Best Brewpubs of 2012	—	Listed
2011	Chicago magazine	36 Best Local Craft Beers	Bottom Up Wit	Top 36
2011	Chicago magazine	36 Best Local Craft Beers	Eugene Porter	Top 36
2011	Chicago Reader Best of Chicago (Readers' Poll)	Best Brewpub	—	Won
2011	RateBeer.com	Top New Brewers in the World	—	Top 5
2011	Chicagoland Brewpub & Microbrewery Shootout	Best Beer/Food Pairing	—	Won
2011	Festival of Barrel Aged Beers	Classic Porter/Stout	Black Power Oatmeal Stout	Silver
2011	Festival of Barrel Aged Beers	Classic Porter/Stout	The General Molasses Porter	Bronze
2010	Chicago Reader Best of Chicago (Readers' Poll)	Best Brewpub	—	Won
2010	Eat Out Awards	Best New Gastropub	—	Won
2010	Chicago magazine Best of Chicago	Best Beer of 2010	Eugene Porter	Won

== See also ==
- List of breweries in Illinois
