= The Red (song) =

Single by Chevelle

from the album Wonder What's Next
- B-side: "Wonder What's Next"
- Released: July 22, 2002
- Studio: The Warehouse (Vancouver, Canada)
- Genre: Nu metal
- Length: 3:58
- Label: Epic
- Songwriters: Pete Loeffler; Sam Loeffler; Joe Loeffler
- Producer: Garth Richardson

Chevelle singles chronology
"Point #1" (2000)	"The Red" (2002)	"Send the Pain Below" (2003)

Music video
- "The Red" on YouTube

"The Red" is a song by American alternative rock band Chevelle. It is the fifth track and lead single from their major label debut, Wonder What's Next, released in 2002. It remains their most popular song to date, being certified 2× platinum by the RIAA and reaching No. 56 on the Billboard Hot 100 and No. 3 on the Mainstream Rock chart.

The song is about dealing with frustration and anger. Its music video depicts an anger management seminar where vocalist Pete Loeffler ascends a podium and sings the verse lyrics. The video then breaks to Chevelle performing the heavy chorus under red lighting. The agitated seminar participants, which include band members Sam Loeffler and Joe Loeffler, begin tossing folding chairs. By the end of the song, it is revealed that the fight happened to be just a daydream.

== Critical reception ==
Loudwire ranked "The Red" the greatest Chevelle song. In 2024, the staff of Consequence included the song in their list of "50 Kick-Butt Post-Grunge Songs We Can Get Behind".

== Track listing ==
No.	Title	Length
1.	"The Red"	3:58
2.	"Wonder What's Next"	4:10

== In other media ==
Former Major League Baseball player Geoff Blum used "The Red" as his intro song when he came up to bat.

In 2021, the song was used at the 2021 WWE Hall of Fame ceremony for a video package commemorating the career of the class headliner Kane.

== Charts ==
Chart (2002–03)	Peak position
US Billboard Hot 100	56
US Alternative Airplay (Billboard)	4
US Mainstream Rock Airplay (Billboard)	3

== Certifications ==
Region	Certification	Certified units/sales
New Zealand (RMNZ)	Platinum	30,000^{‡}
United States (RIAA)	2× Platinum	2,000,000^{‡}
^{‡} Sales+streaming figures based on certification alone.
