= Wonder What's Next =

2002 studio album by Chevelle

Studio album by Chevelle
- Released: October 8, 2002
- Studios: The Warehouse (Vancouver, Canada)
- Genres: Alternative metal; nu metal
- Length: 46:10
- Label: Epic
- Producer: GGGarth

Chevelle chronology
Point #1 (1999)	Wonder What's Next (2002)	This Type of Thinking (Could Do Us In) (2004)

Singles from Wonder What's Next
- 1. "The Red" Released: July 22, 2002; 2. "Send the Pain Below" Released: January 28, 2003; 3. "Closure" Released: September 2, 2003

Wonder What's Next is the second studio album by the American rock band Chevelle, released on October 8, 2002, by Epic Records. Spawning the singles "The Red", "Send the Pain Below", and "Closure", it proved to be Chevelle's breakthrough album, landing them high-profile tour slots including the main stage of Ozzfest 2003. Having been certified double platinum in the US, Wonder What's Next remains the band's most successful album.

== Background and recording ==
After experiencing label troubles, Chevelle's management set up a showcase in New York. The group received three offers, ultimately choosing Epic. After debating between GGGarth and Ben Gross, they enlisted Garth to produce their sophomore album. Recording was scheduled at The Warehouse Studio in Vancouver to begin the day following the September 11 attacks. With a tragic event having just taken place in the band's home country, they were met with an unsettling start to the recording process. The band spent nine weeks at the spacious studio.

Wonder What's Next would feature a heavier, more textured sound than its predecessor, which, according to frontman Pete Loeffler, was "more indie" and didn't effectively capture the band's intensity. While Chevelle's debut album was recorded in standard D tuning, the band switched to drop B, with some songs written in standard D♭ tuning. The band also spent much more time adjusting tones and preparing before recording, as opposed to the less refined studio process of working with Steve Albini. Ben Kaplan, the Pro Tools editor, also took a liberal approach to adding textures underneath much of the music. The band was at first uneasy with this approach but came to appreciate the influence it had on the overall sound. However, the track "One Lonely Visitor" breaks from this with its bare-bones approach; a demo was recorded in a home studio, but after rerecording it with Garth in Vancouver, Loeffler still favored the original, less-produced version for its more natural feel and convinced the label to use it. The same method would be used on the final track of their follow-up album in 2004.

== Touring and promotion ==
"The Red" served as the album's lead single. It had an accompanying music video depicting an anger management seminar and gained heavy rotation on MTV2. "Send the Pain Below" provided an even more successful follow-up single by reaching No. 1 on two charts. It, too, had an accompanying video revolving around a snowboarder. A final single was released in September 2003 with "Closure." The moody track landed spots in the top 20 of both aforementioned charts and had a video featuring concert footage from live version of the song.

Leading up to the album's release, Chevelle toured the United States with Local H and Burning Brides from March through May 2002. They then joined Ozzfest from July through September. For the remainder of the year, Chevelle continued touring the US with Stone Sour and Sinch. Chevelle also performed "The Red" on The Late Late Show with Craig Kilborn on November 8.

The band toured Europe with Audioslave in early 2003 before returning to the US. In the spring, they played on Music as a Weapon II with fellow Chicago-based headliners Disturbed. Chevelle later appeared on the tour compilation album Music as a Weapon II, featuring the songs "The Red" and "Forfeit." The band appeared on the Late Show with David Letterman to perform "Send the Pain Below" on May 20.

From June through August, Chevelle performed on the main stage of Ozzfest, where they recorded and later released the live album Live from the Road and the live DVD Live from the Norva. Starting in November, the band performed radio gigs until the end of the year, when they took a several-month break from touring to begin writing their next album.

== Musical style ==
Musically, Wonder What's Next has been described as an alternative metal and nu metal album, though one that attempts to differentiate itself from similar bands with "heart-on-sleeve lyrics and occasional acoustic ditties." John Wenz of The Daily Nebraskan added that it tries to emulate the "cerebral prog-metal" of Maynard James Keenan's bands, Tool and A Perfect Circle, unlike most of the "Alice in Chains clones out there."

== Critical reception ==
Professional ratings
Review scores
Source	Rating
AllMusic	4.5/5 stars
Blender	2/5 stars
Cross Rhythms	9/10 stars
Jesus Freak Hideout	4/5 stars
Melodic	3.5/5 stars
Rolling Stone	2/5 stars
The Daily Nebraskan	C

Reviews for Wonder What's Next were generally positive. Brian O'Neill of AllMusic noted how the band demonstrates an "indie rock mindset" in spite of the album's slick production. He added "Chevelle managed to retain its credibility yet still put out 11 tracks that, while still catchy, offer uniqueness not often heard in more commercial fare, no mean feat." MusicOMH's Tom Day described the band's sound as comparable to the likes of Helmet, Tool, and Deftones and summed up by stating, "there are no qualms with the high calibre, heavy rock that Chevelle have served up here."

== Commercial performance ==
The album's first single "The Red" was released far in advance in July 2002. It met with significant radio airplay and charted highly on the Mainstream Rock Tracks and Modern Rock Tracks charts. Its music video also gained significant TV rotation. In October, the album debuted at number 14 on the Billboard 200. Its second single "Send the Pain Below" attained even greater success than its predecessor in January 2003, reaching number one on the Mainstream Rock Tracks and Modern Rock Tracks charts. To round off promotion of Wonder What's Next, "Closure" was released as the third and final single far later in September to substantial success.

By mid-2003, Wonder What's Next had sold over one million copies in the US alone. The following year, it had reached 1.3 million. By mid-2020, it has been certified double platinum in the US.

== Track listing ==
All lyrics are written by Pete Loeffler; all music is composed by Chevelle.

No.	Title	Length
1.	"Family System"	4:17
2.	"Comfortable Liar"	3:43
3.	"Send the Pain Below"	4:12
4.	"Closure"	4:11
5.	"The Red"	3:58
6.	"Wonder What's Next"	4:10
7.	"Don't Fake This"	3:39
8.	"Forfeit"	3:59
9.	"Grab Thy Hand"	4:13
10.	"An Evening with El Diablo"	5:43
11.	"One Lonely Visitor"	4:06
Total length:		46:11

Japanese edition bonus tracks
No.	Title	Length
12.	"It's No Good"	3:59
13.	"Black Boys on Mopeds"	3:26
Total length:		53:36

Expanded edition bonus tracks
No.	Title	Length
12.	"Until You're Reformed"	4:00
13.	"(High) Visibility" (Helmet cover)	2:51
14.	"Black Boys on Mopeds" (Sinéad O'Connor cover)	3:26
15.	"It's No Good" (Depeche Mode cover)	3:59
Total length:		60:26

== Personnel ==
Credits taken from the CD liner notes.

Chevelle

- Pete Loeffler – lead vocals, guitar
- Joe Loeffler – bass guitar, backing vocals
- Sam Loeffler – drums

Technical personnel

- Garth Richardson – producer
- Michael "Elvis" Baskette – engineering
- Dean Maher, Amber Gislason – assistant engineers
- Ben Kaplan – digital editing
- Andy Wallace – mixing
- Howie Weinberg – mastering

== Charts ==
Chart (2002)	Peak position
Billboard 200	14
Top Internet Albums	14

== Certifications ==
Region	Certification	Certified units/sales
United States (RIAA)	2× Platinum	2,000,000^{‡}
^{‡} Sales+streaming figures based on certification alone.
