= Pete Loeffler =

Peter Loeffler
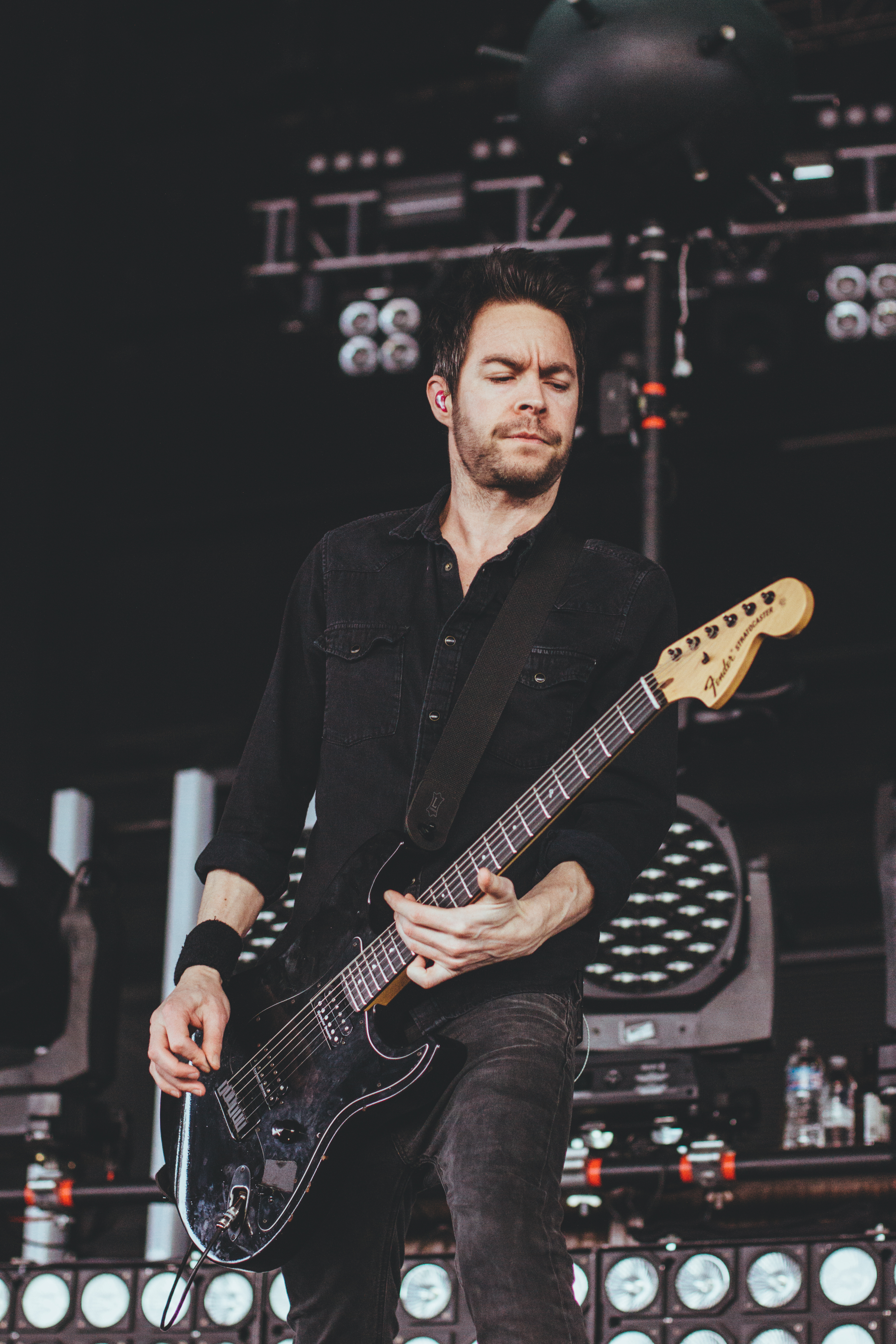
- Loeffler performing in 2014
- Born: October 19, 1976 (age 49); Grayslake, Illinois, U.S.
- Occupations: Musician; singer; songwriter
- Years active: 1995–present
- Spouse: Renate Loeffler (m. 2009)
- Children: 1
- Musical career
- Genres: Hard rock; alternative metal; alternative rock; post-grunge; nu metal
- Instruments: Vocals; guitar; bass
- Member of: Chevelle

Peter Loeffler (/lɛf.lər/ LEF-ler; born October 19, 1976) is an American musician. He is the lead vocalist, guitarist, and songwriter of the rock band Chevelle alongside his brother, drummer Sam Loeffler, who are the only continuous original members of the band.

Pete, Sam, and bassist Joe Loeffler formed Chevelle in 1995. Joe left the band in 2005, later being replaced with their brother-in-law Dean Bernardini.

Chevelle has released ten studio albums.

== Early life ==
Loeffler grew up in a Catholic family. He started off in music when he started taking piano lessons in his family at seven years old.

== Career ==
Pete and his two brothers formed Chevelle in 1995. The band's name came from the band members' passion for fast cars. It was also a car their father liked, the Chevrolet Chevelle. They released their first album, Point #1, in 1999. They later signed a 20-year contract with Epic Records. Since then, they have released nine studio albums under Epic. On October 8, 2012, while performing a show in Tucson, Arizona, Loeffler fell off the stage, which injured his knee and caused swelling. The show continued after a brief intermission and Pete later went to the hospital where it was revealed that he did not break any bones. In a March 17, 2021, interview with Loudwire, Loeffler stated that despite the band selling over six million albums, they haven't gotten any money out of it. The money all went back to Epic. He blames it on signing a bad contract early on in his career; Their tenth album - released in 2025 - was solely produced by Pete Loeffler.

== Equipment ==
From the start of his career to mid-2014, Loeffler used PRS brand guitars, two of which were custom-built for him. He also uses two PRS Custom 22s, one red (which can be seen in the music video for "Send the Pain below") and one white custom 24 (his main live guitar), as well as 2 Custom 24 baritones (one of which is a baritone with red "Xs" on the neck as inlays; the other is gold-top). Pete also owns Fender Stratocaster Sub-Sonic Baritones, but two were stolen along with the rest of the band's gear on May 9, 2007. In earlier live sets, (prior to the band's EP) Pete had played a blue Ibanez RG among other guitars. Pete also reportedly used a Gibson Les Paul for some parts on the 2011 album Hats off to the Bull. As of recently, Loeffler has switched and favored Fender guitars, taking on the road one of his Sub-sonic Stratocasters, as well as a modified Jim Root Stratocaster.

As of 2014, his pedalboard currently consists of these effect pedals:

- Boss GE-7 Equalizer
- Boss TR-2 Tremolo
- Dunlop Cry Baby Wah
- Electro-Harmonix Holy Grail Reverb
- G-Lab True Bypass Wah Pad
- MXR Phase 90
- Peterson StroboStomp 2 Tuner
- Tech 21 SansAmp GT2
- Voodoo Lab Pedal Power 2 Plus

== Style ==
Pete Loeffler's vocal style has been compared to Maynard James Keenan of Tool. In an interview with Ultimate Guitar about their fourth studio album, Vena Sera, Loeffler talked about his vocal style:

"This album does have [screamed vocals] as well. I think I focus on a little bit more of the singing. Typically the screaming should be played at certain key points in the song. You know, we're not a screamo band. We're not a metal band. It shouldn't be the focus. It should be the release. I think I just tried to kind of put it where it's needed and not be over-excessive with it."

The band's ninth studio album, NIRATIAS, balanced the band's melodic and aggressive style. Loeffler compared it to the band's more melodic albums like Hats Off to the Bull and Wonder What's Next, as opposed to the heavier sound of The North Corridor.

== Discography ==
Studio albums

- Point #1 (1999)
- Wonder What's Next (2002)
- This Type of Thinking (Could Do Us In) (2004)
- Vena Sera (2007)
- Sci-Fi Crimes (2009)
- Hats Off to the Bull (2011)
- La Gárgola (2014)
- The North Corridor (2016)
- NIRATIAS (2021)
- Bright as Blasphemy (2025)
