= Send the Pain Below =

2003 single by Chevelle

Single by Chevelle

from the album Wonder What's Next
- Released: January 27, 2003
- Genre: Alternative metal; nu metal; post-grunge
- Length: 4:13
- Label: Epic
- Songwriters: Pete Loeffler; Sam Loeffler; Joe Loeffler
- Producer: GGGarth

Chevelle singles chronology
"The Red" (2002)	"Send the Pain Below" (2003)	"Closure" (2003)

Music video
- "Send the Pain Below" on YouTube

"Send the Pain Below" is a song by American rock band Chevelle, released as the second single from their second album, Wonder What's Next (2002). It is one of their biggest hits, reaching No. 1 on the Modern Rock Tracks chart on July 5, 2003, for a week, and staying on the chart for 36 weeks. It hit No. 1 on the Mainstream Rock Tracks chart a week later on July 12, 2003, and stayed for 35 weeks, including three more intermittently on top. It placed No. 65 on the Billboard Hot 100, lower than their prior single, "The Red", at No. 56.

The song's music video, directed by Jeff Richter, revolves around a snowboarder and his difficulties in striving for excellent performance. The band is seen playing the song in a dark room, with their breath creating fog in the cold air.

== Critical reception ==
Loudwire ranked "Send the Pain Below" the third greatest Chevelle song. In 2024, the staff of Consequence included the song in their list of "50 Kick-Butt Post-Grunge Songs We Can Get Behind".

== Charts ==
Chart (2003)	Peak position
US Billboard Hot 100	65
US Alternative Airplay (Billboard)	1
US Mainstream Rock (Billboard)	1

== Certifications ==
Region	Certification	Certified units/sales
New Zealand (RMNZ)	Gold	15,000^{‡}
United States (RIAA)	Platinum	1,000,000^{‡}
^{‡} Sales+streaming figures based on certification alone.

== See also ==
- List of Billboard Alternative Songs number ones of the 2000s
- List of Billboard Mainstream Rock number-one songs of the 2000
