= Dean Bernardini =

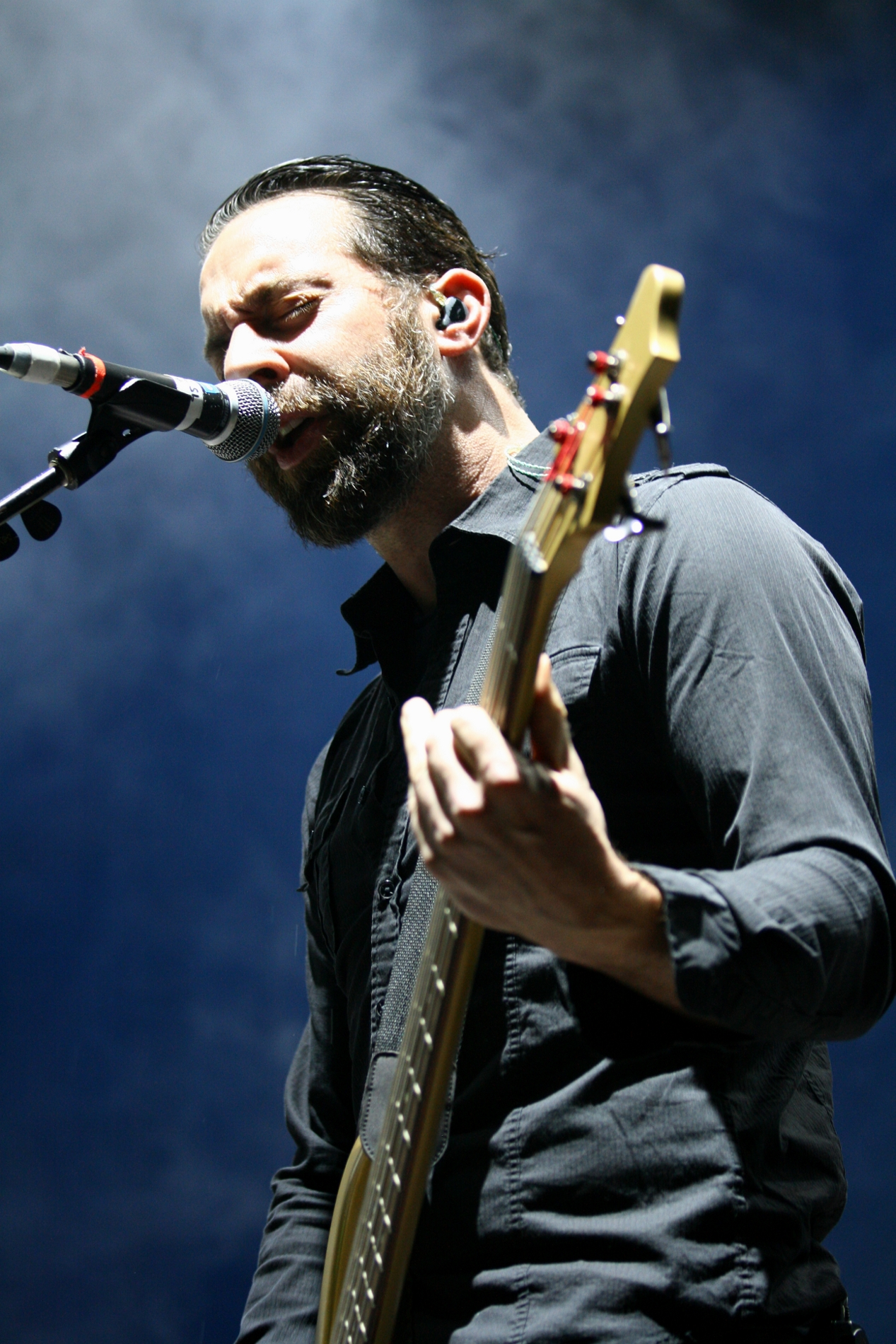
- Bernardini performing in 2014

Background information
- Born: December 27, 1973 (age 52); Deerfield, Illinois, U.S.
- Genres: Alternative metal; nu metal; post-grunge; hard rock
- Instruments: Bass; vocals
- Years active: 2005–2019
- Formerly of: Chevelle

Dean Bernardini (born December 27, 1973) is an American musician, best known as the former bass guitarist and backing vocalist for the rock band Chevelle. He joined the band in 2005 after the departure of Joe Loeffler, who had been a member of the group since 1995. Bernardini is also a noted visual artist and woodworker; the cover of the 2009 album Sci-Fi Crimes was an original 24x48 oil on canvas painting by Bernardini, and he also supplied an original oil on canvas painting for the band's 2012 album Stray Arrows: A Collection of Favorites.

== History ==
Before Chevelle, Bernardini played drums in the Chicago band Liftpoint. Bernardini taught himself to play bass by listening to and attempting to copy bass lines on albums. The first album he played to was Muse's Absolution. When a former member left Chevelle, Bernardini, who is married to the Loeffler's sister, replaced him.

In May 2006, Bernardini injured his left hand forcing the band to pull out of the first eight concert dates (from June 30 to July 26) with Nickelback and Hoobastank. In September 2019, Bernardini announced he would take a hiatus from Chevelle to focus on his family and personal projects.

== Equipment ==
In a feature in Bass Player, Bernardini stated that he uses Gibson Thunderbird and Ibanez BTB bass guitars with Mesa Boogie Big Block 750 amplifiers and Mesa 8x10 cabinets for both clean and distorted tones. He is also a featured artist by both Gibson Guitars and Ibanez Guitars.

The Thunderbirds Bernardini plays are custom built by Ryan Loux of Loux Custom Instruments. One is black with a 35 in (890 mm) scale and Chevelle logo inlays, and another is a white bass that features a custom inlaid fretboard inspired by a Picasso painting, and featuring Nordstrand pickups and an extended 35.375 in (898.5 mm) scale length. The Ibanez BTB570s are modified by Bernardini by refinishing and installing hand-made pickguards and Bartonlini pickups.

He uses custom gauge (65-85-115-130) GHS strings.

== Discography ==
with Chevelle

- Vena Sera (2007)
- Sci-Fi Crimes (2009)
- Hats Off to the Bull (2011)
- La Gárgola (2014)
- The North Corridor (2016)
