= Point No. 1 =

Point #1

Studio album by Chevelle
- Released: May 4, 1999
- Studios: Electrical Audio (Chicago, Illinois)
- Genres: Alternative metal; indie rock
- Length: 42:30
- Label: Squint
- Producer: Steve Albini

Chevelle chronology
The Blue Album (1997)	Point #1 (1999)	Wonder What's Next (2002)

Singles from Point #1
- 1. "Point #1" Released: 1999; 2. "Mia" Released: 2000

Point #1 is the debut studio album by the American rock band Chevelle, released on May 4, 1999. It is the only Chevelle album released by Squint Entertainment and their only collaboration with producer Steve Albini. The album featured a notable single in its title track but achieved only minor success, especially compared to Chevelle's major label follow-up in 2002.

== Background and recording ==
After recording a demo, Chevelle played small concerts for three years until being signed to Steve Taylor's independent Christian label Squint Entertainment. The album was recorded and mixed in 17 days at Electrical Audio by producer Steve Albini, famous for his work with the likes of Nirvana, Cheap Trick, and PJ Harvey. According to Chevelle frontman Pete Loeffler, Albini gave their album an unrefined "indie feel" in which the recording process was essentially "plug in, he hits record, and you play." Loeffler added, "At the time I was shocked talking to someone who had worked closely to Kurt Cobain. It was a trip. It was really cool." However, the band was left unsatisfied and feeling that he didn't achieve the tones and overall sound they were looking for. They called Albini and, much to his surprise, expressed disappointment with the final product. Although they enjoyed working with him, Chevelle wanted to find a different producer to resolve the issue; however, their label gave them no choice but to work with Albini once again. The second phase of recording was, according to Loeffler, much more laid back and relaxed in which Albini "really opened up."

== Touring and promotion ==
To promote the album, Chevelle toured with artists such as Filter, Sevendust, Powerman 5000, and Machine Head.

Albini and an aspiring comedian named Fred Armisen starred in the band's Point #1 EPK (electronic press kit)—several years before Armisen became famous on Saturday Night Live. The year following the album's release, a promotional single was released for the title track, which landed a marginal spot on Billboard's Mainstream Rock chart and had an accompanying music video. "Mia" had also been released as a promotional single the year prior. It also had a video.

== Critical reception ==
Professional ratings
Review scores
Source	Rating
AllMusic	3/5 stars
Cross Rhythms	10/10 stars
Jesus Freak Hideout	2/5 stars

Critical reception for Point #1 varied. Heather Phares of AllMusic gave a positive review, noting how Albini helped the band "create forceful, mercurial indie rock" and added "In line with Chicago's ambitious music scene, Chevelle's challenging take on rock is also a rewarding one."

In a 2013 article, Brian Baker of Cincinnati CityBeat wrote that Point #1 "reflected the Loefflers' alternative/hard rock influences (Helmet, Tool, The Cure)". He also claimed that the album "caused a dust-up with its release on a Christian music label, creating confusion over Chevelle's philosophical perspective".

Chevelle received GMA Dove Awards for "Mia" in 2000 and "Point #1" in 2001. The album also received an award for "Hard Music Album" in 2000 by the Dove Awards.

== Track listing ==
All lyrics are written by Pete Loeffler; all music is composed by Chevelle.

No.	Title	Length
1.	"Open"	2:01
2.	"Point #1"	4:23
3.	"Prove to You"	3:05
4.	"Mia"	2:19
5.	"Skeptic"	4:04
6.	"Anticipation"	3:07
7.	"Dos"	6:28
8.	"Long"	4:35
9.	"Blank Earth"	5:26
10.	"SMA"	2:54
11.	"Peer"	4:08
Total length:		42:34

== Personnel ==
All credits for Point No. 1 are adapted from the album's liner notes.

Chevelle

- Pete Loeffler – vocals, guitar
- Joe Loeffler – bass
- Sam Loeffler – drums

Production

- Steve Albini – production, recording, mixing
- Hank Williams – mastering at Mastermix (Nashville, Tennessee)
- Mark Smalling – photography
- Buddy Jackson – art direction
- Sally Carns – design, back cover image
- Jackson Design – design, back cover image
