= Hollywood Undead discography =

- Studio albums: 8
- Extended plays: 4
- Live albums: 1
- Singles: 50
- Music videos: 39
- Remix albums: 1

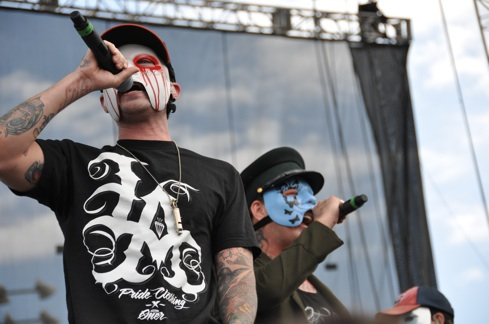

The discography of American rap rock band Hollywood Undead consists of eight studio albums, one live album, one remix album, four extended plays, fifty singles and thirty-nine music videos.

== Albums ==
=== Studio albums ===
List of studio albums, with selected chart positions and certifications
| Title | Album details | Peak chart positions | | | | | | | Certifications |
| Title | Album details | US | US Alt. | US Rock | AUS | CAN | NLD | UK | Certifications |
|---|---|---|---|---|---|---|---|---|---|
| Swan Songs | Released: September 2, 2008 (US); Label: A&M/Octone, Polydor; Formats: CD, digital download, LP, PD | 22 | — | 8 | — | — | 90 | 85 | RIAA: Platinum; MC: Platinum; BPI: Silver |
| American Tragedy | Released: April 5, 2011 (US); Label: A&M/Octone, Polydor; Formats: CD, digital download, PD | 4 | 2 | 2 | — | 5 | — | 43 | RIAA: Gold; BPI: Silver |
| Notes from the Underground | Released: January 8, 2013 (US); Label: A&M/Octone, Polydor; Formats: CD, digital download | 2 | 1 | 1 | — | 1 | — | 99 | |
| Day of the Dead | Released: March 31, 2015; Label: Interscope; Formats: CD, digital download, LP | 18 | 4 | 4 | — | 4 | — | 34 | |
| Five | Released: October 27, 2017; Label: BMG; Formats: CD, digital download, LP | 22 | 1 | 3 | 42 | 11 | 31 | 31 | |
| New Empire, Vol. 1 | Released: February 14, 2020; Label: BMG; Formats: CD, digital download, LP | 125 | 18 | 14 | 28 | 59 | 24 | 54 | |
| New Empire, Vol. 2 | Released: December 4, 2020; Label: BMG; Formats: CD, digital download, LP | 154 | 2 | 3 | 24 | 4 | 34 | — | |
| Hotel Kalifornia | Released: August 12, 2022; Label: BMG; Formats: CD, digital download, LP | 149 | 14 | 24 | — | — | — | — | |
"—" denotes a recording that did not chart or was not released in that territory.

=== Live albums ===
List of live albums, with selected chart positions
| Title | Album details | Peak chart positions | | |
| Title | Album details | US | US Alt. | US Rock |
|---|---|---|---|---|
| Desperate Measures | Released: November 10, 2009 (US); Label: A&M/Octone; Formats: CD, digital download | 29 | 8 | 10 |

=== Remix albums ===
List of remix albums, with selected chart positions
| Title | Album details | Peak chart positions | |
| Title | Album details | US Dance | US Rock |
|---|---|---|---|
| American Tragedy Redux | Released: November 21, 2011 (US); Label: A&M/Octone; Formats: CD, digital download | 9 | 49 |

== Extended plays ==
List of extended plays, with selected chart positions
| Title | Extended play details | Peak chart positions | |
| Title | Extended play details | US | US Rock |
|---|---|---|---|
| Swan Songs B-Sides | Released: June 23, 2009; Label: A&M/Octone; Formats: Digital download | 124 | 50 |
| Swan Songs Rarities | Released: April 20, 2010; Label: A&M/Octone; Formats: Digital download | 29 | — |
| Black Dahlia Remixes | Released: September 13, 2010; Label: A&M/Octone; Formats: Digital download | — | — |
| Psalms | Released: November 2, 2018; Label: BMG; Formats: Digital download | — | — |
"—" denotes a recording that did not chart or was not released in that territory.

== Singles ==
=== As lead artist ===
List of singles, with selected chart positions, showing year released and album name
| Year | Song | Peak chart positions | | | | | | | Certifications | Album |
| Year | Song | US Bub. | US Alt. | US Main. Rock | US Rock | US Hard Rock Digi. | US Hard Rock | UK | Certifications | Album |
|---|---|---|---|---|---|---|---|---|---|---|
| 2008 | "No. 5" | — | — | — | — | — | — | — | RIAA: Gold | Swan Songs |
| 2008 | "Undead" | 4 | 12 | 10 | — | 16 | — | 145 | RIAA: 2× Platinum; BPI: Silver | Swan Songs |
| 2008 | "Christmas in Hollywood" | — | — | — | — | — | — | — | | Non-album single |
| 2009 | "Young" | — | 34 | 28 | — | — | — | — | RIAA: Gold | Swan Songs |
| 2009 | "This Love, This Hate" | — | — | — | — | — | — | — | | Swan Songs |
| 2009 | "Dove and Grenade" | — | — | — | — | — | — | — | | Desperate Measures |
| 2009 | "Everywhere I Go" | — | 38 | — | — | — | — | — | RIAA: 2× Platinum; BPI: Silver; RMNZ: Gold | Swan Songs |
| 2010 | "Black Dahlia" | — | — | — | — | — | — | — | RIAA: Gold | Swan Songs |
| 2010 | "Hear Me Now" | 1 | 20 | 9 | 23 | 5 | — | — | RIAA: Gold | American Tragedy |
| 2011 | "Been to Hell" | 2 | — | 30 | — | 1 | — | — | | American Tragedy |
| 2011 | "Coming Back Down" | — | — | — | — | 14 | — | — | | American Tragedy |
| 2011 | "Comin' in Hot" | — | — | — | — | 4 | — | — | RIAA: Gold | American Tragedy |
| 2011 | "My Town" | — | — | — | — | — | — | — | | American Tragedy |
| 2011 | "Bullet" | — | — | — | — | — | — | — | RIAA: Gold | American Tragedy |
| 2011 | "Levitate" | — | — | — | — | 11 | — | — | | American Tragedy |
| 2011 | "Levitate (Digital Dog Club Mix)" | — | — | 38 | 34 | — | — | — | | American Tragedy Redux |
| 2012 | "We Are" | — | — | 24 | 33 | 1 | — | — | RIAA: Gold | Notes from the Underground |
| 2013 | "Dead Bite" | — | — | — | 35 | 3 | — | — | | Notes from the Underground |
| 2013 | "Dead Bite (Dead Planets Remix)" | — | — | — | 4 | — | — | — | | Non-album single |
| 2013 | "Another Way Out" | — | — | — | — | — | — | — | | Notes from the Underground |
| 2014 | "Day of the Dead" | — | — | — | 17 | 1 | — | — | RIAA: Gold | Day of the Dead |
| 2015 | "Usual Suspects" | — | — | — | — | 10 | — | — | | Day of the Dead |
| 2015 | "Gravity" | — | — | — | — | 23 | — | — | | Day of the Dead |
| 2015 | "How We Roll" | — | — | — | — | 21 | — | — | | Day of the Dead |
| 2015 | "Live Forever" | — | — | — | — | — | — | — | | Day of the Dead |
| 2015 | "Disease" | — | — | — | — | 8 | — | — | | Day of the Dead |
| 2015 | "War Child" | — | — | — | — | — | — | — | | Day of the Dead |
| 2017 | "California Dreaming" | — | — | 35 | — | 6 | — | — | | Five |
| 2017 | "Whatever It Takes" | — | — | — | — | 7 | — | — | | Five |
| 2017 | "Renegade" | — | — | — | — | 13 | — | — | | Five |
| 2017 | "We Own the Night" | — | — | — | — | 11 | — | — | | Five |
| 2018 | "Whatever It Takes (Mixtape)" (featuring Prodigal Sunn, Demrick and Fudd Rukus) | — | — | — | — | — | — | — | | Non-album single |
| 2018 | "Gotta Let Go" | — | — | — | — | — | — | — | | Psalms |
| 2018 | "Another Level" | — | — | — | — | — | — | — | | Psalms |
| 2019 | "Already Dead" | — | — | — | 23 | 6 | — | — | | New Empire, Vol. 1 |
| 2019 | "Time Bomb" | — | — | — | — | 11 | — | — | | New Empire, Vol. 1 |
| 2020 | "Empire" | — | — | — | — | — | — | — | | New Empire, Vol. 1 |
| 2020 | "Idol" (featuring Tech N9ne) | — | — | — | — | 4 | 7 | — | | New Empire, Vol. 2 |
| 2020 | "The End / Undead" (with Zero 9:36) | — | — | — | — | — | — | — | | ...If You Don't Save Yourself |
| 2020 | "Coming Home" | — | — | — | — | 18 | 21 | — | | New Empire, Vol. 2 |
| 2020 | "Heart of a Champion (Remix)" (featuring Papa Roach and Ice Nine Kills) | — | — | — | — | 16 | 11 | — | | New Empire, Vol. 2 |
| 2020 | "Gonna Be OK" | — | — | — | — | — | — | — | | New Empire, Vol. 2 |
| 2021 | "Runaway" (with Imanbek) | — | — | — | — | — | — | — | | Non-album singles |
| 2021 | "Shadows" (with Blasterjaxx) | — | — | — | — | — | — | — | | Non-album singles |
| 2022 | "Chaos" | — | — | — | — | 5 | 16 | — | | Hotel Kalifornia |
| 2022 | "Wild in These Streets" | — | — | — | — | — | — | — | | Hotel Kalifornia |
| 2022 | "City of the Dead" | — | — | 27 | — | — | — | — | | Hotel Kalifornia |
| 2022 | "Trap God" | — | — | — | — | — | — | — | | Hotel Kalifornia |
| 2023 | "Evil" | — | — | — | — | — | — | — | | Hotel Kalifornia |
| 2023 | "Salvation" | — | — | — | — | — | — | — | | Hotel Kalifornia |
| 2023 | "House of Mirrors" (featuring Jelly Roll) | — | — | — | — | — | 17 | — | | Hotel Kalifornia |
| 2024 | "Hollywood Forever" | — | — | 19 | — | — | 13 | — | | TBA |
| 2025 | "Savior" | — | — | 19 | — | — | 24 | — | | TBA |
| 2026 | "1×1" | — | — | — | — | — | — | — | | TBA |
| 2026 | "All My Friends" (feat. Jeris Johnson) | — | — | — | — | — | — | — | | TBA |
| 2026 | "Feels Like Home" | — | — | — | — | — | — | — | | TBA |
"—" denotes a recording that did not chart or was not released in that territory.

=== As featured artist ===
List of singles as featured artist, with selected chart positions, showing year released and album name
| Year | Song | Peak chart positions | Album |
| Year | Song | US Main. Rock | Album |
|---|---|---|---|
| 2021 | "For the Glory" (All Good Things featuring Hollywood Undead) | 1 | A Hope in Hell |

== Other charted songs ==
List of singles as lead artist, showing year released and album name
| Title | Year | Peak chart positions | | Album |
| Title | Year | US Holiday | US Hard Rock Digi. | Album |
|---|---|---|---|---|
| 2010 | "Christmas In Hollywood" | 7 | — | Non-album single |
| 2012 | "Up In Smoke" | — | 18 | Notes From the Underground |
| 2013 | "Believe" | — | 13 | Notes From the Underground |

== Other certified songs ==
List of other certified songs, with selected certifications, showing year released and album name
| Title | Year | Certifications | Album |
|---|---|---|---|
| "City" | 2008 | RIAA: Gold | Swan Songs |

== Music videos ==
=== Traditional videos ===
List of music videos, showing year released and director
| Year | Song | Album | Director(s) | Type | Link |
|---|---|---|---|---|---|
| 2006 | "No. 5" (2006 version) | Swan Songs | Don Salvatore & Steven B. | Performance | |
| 2008 | "No. 5" (2008 version) | Swan Songs | Jonas Åkerlund | Tour footage | |
| 2008 | "Undead" | Swan Songs | Jonas Åkerlund | Tour footage | |
| 2009 | "Young" | Swan Songs | Kevin Kerslake | Narrative | |
| 2009 | "Everywhere I Go" | Swan Songs | Charlie Scene & Spence Nicholson | Performance | |
| 2011 | "Hear Me Now" | American Tragedy | Jonas Åkerlund | Performance | |
| 2011 | "Been to Hell" | American Tragedy | Jeff Janke & Corey Soria | Narrative | |
| 2011 | "Comin' in Hot" | American Tragedy | Kai Henry & Robert Corbi | Narrative | |
| 2011 | "Levitate" (Digital Dog Club Mix) | American Tragedy Redux | Don Tyler | Performance | |
| 2012 | "We Are" | Notes from the Underground | Shawn Crahan | Narrative | |
| 2013 | "My Town" | American Tragedy | Michael Brewer | Performance | |
| 2013 | "Dead Bite" | Notes from the Underground | Corey Soria | Narrative | |
| 2015 | "Day of the Dead" | Day of the Dead | Spence Nicholson | Performance | |
| 2015 | "Usual Suspects" | Day of the Dead | Brian Cox | Narrative | |
| 2015 | "Gravity" | Day of the Dead | Brian Cox | Narrative | |
| 2017 | "California Dreaming" | Five | Brian Cox | Narrative | |
| 2017 | "Whatever It Takes" | Five | Charlie Scene & Brian Cox | Narrative | |
| 2017 | "Renegade" | Five | Jake Stark | Narrative | |
| 2017 | "We Own the Night" | Five | Amber Park | Performance | |
| 2017 | "Black Cadillac" | Five | Brian Cox | Performance | |
| 2018 | "Your Life" | Five | Brian Cox | Performance | |
| 2018 | "Whatever It Takes" (Mixtape) | Non-album single | Brian Cox | Performance | |
| 2018 | "Gotta Let Go" | Psalms | Caleb Mallery | Narrative | |
| 2019 | "Riot" | Five | Brian Cox | Performance | |
| 2019 | "Levitate" | American Tragedy | Brian Cox | Performance | |
| 2019 | "Already Dead" | New Empire, Vol. 1 | Unknown | Narrative | |
| 2020 | "Empire" | New Empire, Vol. 1 | Wombat Fire | Performance | |
| 2020 | "Nightmare" | New Empire, Vol. 1 | Cameron Nunez | Narrative | |
| 2020 | "Idol" | New Empire, Vol. 2 | Wombat Fire | Performance | |
| 2020 | "The End / Undead" | ...If You Don't Save Yourself | Unknown | Performance | |
| 2020 | "Heart of a Champion" (Remix) | New Empire, Vol. 2 | Frankie Nasso | Narrative | |
| 2022 | "Chaos" | Hotel Kalifornia | Jensen Noen | Performance | |
| 2022 | "City of the Dead" | Hotel Kalifornia | Brian Cox | Narrative | |
| 2022 | "Hourglass" | Hotel Kalifornia | Cameron Nunez | Performance | |
| 2023 | "Lion Eyes" | Hotel Kalifornia | Charlie Scene & Cameron Nunez | Performance | |
| 2023 | "Evil" | Hotel Kalifornia | Cameron Nunez | Performance | |
| 2023 | "Ruin My Life" | Hotel Kalifornia | Cameron Nunez | Performance | |
| 2023 | "House of Mirrors" | Hotel Kalifornia | Brendan Barone | Performance | |
| 2024 | "Alright" | Hotel Kalifornia | Cameron Nunez | Performance | |
| 2024 | "Hollywood Forever" | TBA | B.K. Barone | Narrative | |
| 2025 | "Savior" | TBA | Vicente Cordero | Performance | |
| 2026 | "1×1" | TBA | Mason Wright | Performance | |

=== Lyric videos ===
| Year | Song | Album | Type | Link |
|---|---|---|---|---|
| 2010 | "Hear Me Now" | American Tragedy | White text on black background | |
| 2011 | "Been to Hell" | American Tragedy | Studio and street footage | |
| 2011 | "Coming Back Down" | American Tragedy | Live performance footage | |
| 2011 | "Bullet" | American Tragedy | Notepad scroll | |
| 2012 | "Dead Bite" | Notes from the Underground | White text on smokey background | |
| 2012 | "We Are" | Notes from the Underground | Street footage | |
| 2012 | "Up in Smoke" | Notes from the Underground | Narrative film clip | |
| 2013 | "Pigskin" | Notes from the Underground | Narrative film clip | |
| 2013 | "Believe" | Notes from the Underground | Graffiti on various objects | |
| 2013 | "Outside" | Notes from the Underground | Los Angeles skyline footage | |
| 2013 | "Another Way Out" | Notes from the Underground | First-person footage of running through woods | |
| 2013 | "Lion" | Notes from the Underground | Timelapse of sunset | |
| 2020 | "Heart of a Champion" | New Empire, Vol. 1 | Various chaotic visuals | |
| 2020 | "Idol" | New Empire, Vol. 2 | Silhouetted performance | |
| 2020 | "The End / Undead" | ...If You Don't Save Yourself | Text over embers and flame | |
| 2020 | "Coming Home" | New Empire, Vol. 2 | Animated visuals | |
| 2020 | "Gonna Be OK" | New Empire, Vol. 2 | Animation of Dead Bite mask | |
| 2020 | "Medicate" | New Empire, Vol. 2 | Animation of Dead Bite mask | |
| 2020 | "Ghost Out" | New Empire, Vol. 2 | Animation of Dead Bite mask | |
| 2020 | "Unholy" | New Empire, Vol. 2 | Animation of Dead Bite mask | |
| 2020 | "Worth It" | New Empire, Vol. 2 | Animation of Dead Bite mask | |
| 2020 | "Monsters" | New Empire, Vol. 2 | Animation of Dead Bite mask | |
| 2020 | "Comin' Thru the Stereo" | New Empire, Vol. 2 | Animation of Dead Bite mask | |
