= My Town (Hollywood Undead song) =

Single by Hollywood Undead

from the album American Tragedy
- Released: April 2011
- Recorded: November 2010
- Genre: Rap rock; alternative rock
- Length: 3:36 (album edit)
- Label: A&M Octone
- Songwriter(s): Johnny 3 Tears; Funny Man; Danny
- Producer(s): Don Gilmore (also exec.); Sam Hollander; Dave Katz

Hollywood Undead singles chronology
"Comin' in Hot" (2011)	"My Town" (2011)	"Bullet" (2011)

"My Town" is a song by American rap rock band Hollywood Undead. It is the fifth single from their second studio album, American Tragedy, and the fourth track on that album. It is the band's ninth overall single in their discography. A remix was featured on the band's American Tragedy Redux remix album.

== Background ==
The band had been recording for a second album since early 2010, with the first singles "Hear Me Now", "Comin' in Hot" and "Been to Hell" along with the accidentally leaked Coming Back Down being released prior to the album's release date, with being released shortly after. The first surfacing of the track was on March 27, 2011, when the band played it live at Extreme Thing 2011 and put into the band's live playlist from thereafter. The track was included as the fourth track on the American Tragedy album. The track was announced as the fifth single in early 2011, with shooting for the music video being shot in July 2011. For the first time, the band asked fans to send in videos of themselves singing to "My Town", playing guitar, bass, rhythm, or drums for the track, or performing in any way in their town or at landmarks to be included in the official music video. The band also released a brief teaser video explaining the details. Submissions closed on July 22.

The track was featured on several promotional trailers for the Capcom game Street Fighter X Tekken, and may be featured on the game's soundtrack. A remix of the song by Andrew W.K. was included on the 2011 remix album American Tragedy Redux.

== Music video ==
A music video for My Town was announced on July 8, 2011 on Hollywood Undead's official website and also said that fans would be in the video if they recorded themselves in front of a famous landmark or in any other way they choose. Submissions then closed on July 22, 2011. Filming began in late July, but after almost two years, the music video is still nowhere to be seen and has no specific release date. It is possible that the video may not be officially released at all. However, it leaked on Vik Winchester's YouTube channel in June 2013.

== Reception ==
=== Critical ===
The track was individually reviewed by Gamings Rapture, which gave the track a nine out a possible ten. The reviewer praised the production on the track and called the chorus, "epic". The review proceeded to call the track, "easily one of the best tracks on the album," and pointed out mediocre verses as the track's only weakness. The review also noted the lyrics, stating, "It’s a anthem for your own town. Doesn’t matter where you’re from, you can sing it and mean it." A review by SoCal Music Today listed "My Town" as one of the key tracks on the album.

== Personnel ==
Hollywood Undead

- Charlie Scene – background vocals, lead guitar, composer
- Da Kurlzz – drums, percussion, background vocals, composer
- Danny – clean vocals
- Funny Man – vocals, background vocals, composer
- J-Dog – keyboards, synthesizers, piano, rhythm guitar, bass guitar, background vocals, composer, additional production, engineering
- Johnny 3 Tears – vocals, background vocals, composer

Production

- Don Gilmore – executive producer, recording, programming
- Dave Katz – producer
- Sam Hollander – producer
