= Bullet (Hollywood Undead song) =

Single by Hollywood Undead

from the album American Tragedy
- Released: April 4, 2011
- Length: 3:18
- Label: A&M Octone; Polydor; Universal Music Australia; Universal Music Group
- Songwriters: Dylan Alvarez the 3rd; Griffin Boice; Matthew Busek; Jorel Decker; Daniel Murillo; George Ragan; Jordon Terrell
- Producer: Griffin Boice

Hollywood Undead singles chronology
"My Town" (2011)	"Bullet" (2011)	"Levitate" (2011)

Music video
- "Bullet" (Undead house party) on YouTube

"Bullet" is a song by American rap rock band Hollywood Undead. It was recorded as the sixth single and eleventh track from their second studio album American Tragedy (2011). The song was produced by Griffin Boice. This song is one of the few songs by Hollywood Undead to feature a member other than Danny or Deuce as the clean vocalist. Charlie Scene performs the chorus of "Bullet," in addition to "Rain" from Notes from the Underground. The song has received positive reviews from critics due to its cheerful tone and uptempo beat that directly contrast its dark lyrics about suicide and self-harm.

== Background and development ==
“Bullet” contains verses by Terrell and Ragan, and a b-section and chorus sung by Terrell.

The song was produced, recorded, and mixed by Griffin Boice at the Beat Suite in Hollywood, California.

== Composition and lyrics ==
The acoustic guitar pattern repeats throughout the intro and outro, the verse, the pre-chorus and the chorus in a pattern of intro-verse-pre chorus-chorus-verse-pre chorus-outro, with the chord progression being E-B-C♯m-A. The chord progression during the pre-chorus is G♯m-F♯m-E-D♯m-C-B, with every chord following a two strum pattern, with the exceptions of C and B, which both follow an eight strum pattern.

The lyrics detail a teenage male's trouble with suicide. The chorus, which the song opens with, implies past attempts at suicide for the protagonist: "My legs are dangling off the edge, the bottom of the bottle is my only friend. I think I'll slit my wrist again, and I'm gone, gone, gone, gone! My legs are dangling off the edge, a stomach full of pills didn't work again. I put a bullet in my head, and I'm gone, gone, gone, gone!" The protagonist continues in the verses to describe the decomposition of his life, stating that his "two best friends" are "a bottle of pills" and "a bottle of Gin". We then learn he is at the top of a twenty story building, and that the polishing of a bottle is "pushing [me]" off and he describes how asphalt has never "looked so soft". The protagonist begins to express concern that his mother found his suicide note and had called the police. He starts realising he needs to move fast, as he hears "sirens and they're off in the distance" and that he's "more scarred than my wrist is". He states that he's going to purchase a suit, because "when you go to meet God ya know you wanna look nice." The pre-chorus states that "So if I survive then I'll see you tomorrow" and the chorus plays again. Johnny 3 Tears takes the second verse from a third-person point of view of another young man who had an abusive family life. The young man's father had apparently abandoned him, which left his mother guilt-struck, and he had gone astray in a way that is not specified. It is, however, stated that he "Climbed to the roof to see if [you] could fly". This ends the verse, and goes into the pre-chorus and chorus. After the chorus, Petra Christensen sings the outro stated by J-Dog in a Hollywood Undead live cast in January promoting the release for the band's latest album.

== Remix contest ==
The band has hosted a remix contest for the songs "Bullet" and "Le Deux". Bullet's remix is hosted on Indaba Music and is chosen by voting majority. One of the top five voted remixes will be picked by the band themselves, and will receive the grand prize of a Cakewalk SONAR X1 Producer, a Cakewalk Z3TA+2 virtual instrument, and a Roland audio interface. The hole of it will also be featured on an upcoming official remix EP. Five honorable mentions from the top ten remixes will be sent a Hollywood Undead album signed by the members. Submissions for the contest were due by August 24, 2011.

== Critical reception ==
The song has received positive reviews from music critics. Rick Florino of Artist Direct had a list of ten reasons readers needed American Tragedy, with number three being the track "Bullet". Florino explains that "Hollywood Undead snap from faint acoustic guitar into cinematic rhyming about suicide. It's as infectious as it is intense." He states that the ending refrain featuring a little girl "is utterly powerful." He also stated that "Bullet" is "the kind of song that could save some kid in the crowd," and closed his review stating that the song is "heart-wrenching genius." In his official review, Florino again referenced "Bullet" stating it was one of "two moments that make [American Tragedy] a classic," stating that "After an acoustic intro, the song tells a potent and poignant tale of longing for suicide. However, it's the sunniest and catchiest tune on American Tragedy" and that the band's genius lies "in that dangerous space between unforgettable and unsettling." He compared Johnny 3 Tears' verse to being as soulful as Jonathan Davis of Korn. The album as a whole garnered five out of five stars.

Jeremy Borjon of Revolver described the song as "a disturbingly upbeat song about a man attempting suicide" and included it with several other songs as high points of the album. He gave the album four out of five stars.

Richard Solomon of The Minaret stated that the song was in a part of the album that "stayed strong and continued to please", and analyzed it as "an intense song about suicide," and stated that "[t]he lyrics are probably more depressing than most. The twist? It has a melody happier than many songs, an upbeat and almost peppy tempo that's completely at odds with lyrics like, 'I never bought a suit before in my life, but when you go to meet God you know you wanna look nice!' and, 'A stomach full of pills didn't work again. I put a bullet in my head, and I'm gone, gone, gone, gone!'" He later analyzed that "[t]he final verse is different and is sung by what sounds like a little girl and adds to the 'happy' melody, but with the previous lyrics it just makes it even sadder," and stated that "if 'Comin' in Hot' is a successor to 'No. 5,' then this song is the successor to '[sic] My Black Dahlia.'" Solomon gave the album a positive review, granting four and a half out of five stars.

== Credits and personnel ==
The credits for "Bullet" are adapted from the liner notes of American Tragedy.

Recording

- Recorded at: The Beat Suite in Hollywood, California.
- Drums recorded at: NRG Studios, North Hollywood, California.

Personnel

- Charlie Scene – clean vocals, rapping, guitar, composer, writer
- Johnny 3 Tears – vocals, composer, writer
- Petra Christensen – end vocals
- J-Dog – synthesizers, keyboards, composer, writer
- Danny – composer, writer, background vocals
- Griffin Boice – production, recording, mixing, guitar, bass guitar, programming, percussion, composer, writer
- Sean Curiel – drum recording assistant
- Ken Dudley – additional recording
- Daren Pfeifer – drums

== Certifications ==
Region	Certification	Certified units/sales
United States (RIAA)	Gold	500,000^{‡}
^{‡} Sales+streaming figures based on certification alone.
