= Revolt Tour =

2011 concert tour by Hollywood Undead

- Tour by Hollywood Undead
- The official banner for the tour
- Location: North America
- Associated album: American Tragedy
- Start date: April 6, 2011
- End date: May 27, 2011
- Legs: 1
- No. of shows: 30

Hollywood Undead concert chronology
- Nightmare After Christmas Tour (2011); Revolt Tour (2011); Endless Summer Tour (2011)

The Revolt Tour was a tour by rap rock band Hollywood Undead, taking place in support of their second studio album American Tragedy, which was released on April 5, 2011. The tour began the day after the album's North American release on April 6, 2011. The tour follows their supporting role in Bullet for my Valentine's Fever Tour in late 2010 and Avenged Sevenfold's Nightmare After Christmas Tour in early 2011. It is the band's first headlining promotional tour following their 2009 touring in support of their 2008 debut album, Swan Songs.

The tour began in Boston, Massachusetts on April 6, 2011 and concluded on May 27 in Des Moines, Iowa. The tour venues consisted mainly of "House of Blues" locations along with other various venues along the way. Following the Revolt Tour, Hollywood Undead played several festivals then headlined a second major tour, the Endless Summer Tour, where they were joined by All That Remains beginning on July 9, 2011. Supporting act All That Remains was in the tour in support of their album, For We Are Many.

== Set list ==
Hollywood Undead (headliner)
1. "Undead"
2. "Sell Your Soul"
3. "Been to Hell"
4. "Bottle and a Gun"
5. "Gangsta Sexy" (performed in place of "Bottle and a Gun" on certain tour dates)
6. "California"
7. "City"
8. "Black Dahlia"
9. "Comin' in Hot"
10. "Paradise Lost"
11. "My Town"
12. "No. 5"
13. "Young"

Encore

14. "Everywhere I Go"
15. "Hear Me Now"
10 Years (support)
1. "The Wicked Ones"
2. "At a Loss"
3. "Empires"
4. "Now is the Time (Ravenous)"
5. "Fade into (The Ocean)"
6. "Fix Me"
7. "Wasteland"
8. "Shoot it Out"
New Medicine (support)
1. "The Takeover"
2. "American Wasted"
3. "Race You to the Bottom"
4. "Little Sister"
5. "Resolve to Fight"
6. "Laid"
7. "Rich Kids"
Drive-A (support)
1. "Loss of Desire"
2. "Everyone's Alone"
3. "Head Underwater"
4. "It's Getting Worse"
5. "Out of Focus"
6. "The Hell with Motivation"
7. "Take a Side"
8. "Can't Sleep It Off"
9. "Are You Blind"

== Tour dates ==
Date	City	Country	Venue
April 6, 2011	Boston	United States	House of Blues
April 8, 2011	Wallingford	United States	The Dome at Oakdale
April 9, 2011	New York City	United States	Irving Plaza
April 10, 2011	Buffalo	United States	Town Ballroom
April 12, 2011	Philadelphia	United States	Theater of Living Arts
April 13, 2011	Maryland	United States	Bourbon Street Ballroom
April 15, 2011	Charlotte	United States	The Fillmore Charlotte
April 17, 2011	For Lauderdale	United States	Revolution
April 19, 2011	New Orleans	United States	House of Blues
April 20, 2011	Dallas	United States	House of Blues
April 22, 2011	Albuquerque	United States	Sunshine Theater
April 25, 2011	Modesto	United States	Modesto Center Plaza
April 26, 2011	Reno	United States	Knitting Factory Concert House
April 27, 2011	Sacramento	United States	Ace of Spades
April 29, 2011	San Diego	United States	House of Blues
April 30, 2011	Los Angeles	United States	The Wiltern
May 1, 2011	San Francisco	United States	The Fillmore
May 3, 2011	Spokane	United States	Knitting Factory Concert House
May 6, 2011	Las Vegas	United States	House of Blues
May 9, 2011	Odessa	United States	Dos Amigos
May 10, 2011	Houston	United States	House of Blues
May 12, 2011	Denver	United States	The Fillmore Auditorium
May 14, 2011	Chicago	United States	House of Blues
May 17, 2011	Myrtle Beach	United States	House of Blues
May 18, 2011	Atlanta	United States	Tabernacle
May 20, 2011	Cincinnati	United States	Bogart's
May 21, 2011	Detroit	United States	St. Andrew's Hall
May 24, 2011	Cleveland	United States	House of Blues
May 25, 2011	Grand Rapids	United States	The Orbit Room
May 27, 2011	Des Moines	United States	Val Air Ballroom

== Support acts ==
- 10 Years
- Drive-A
- New Medicine
