= Coming Back Down =

Single by Hollywood Undead

from the album American Tragedy
- Released: March 15, 2011
- Recorded: May–December 2010
- Genre: Alternative rock; rap rock
- Length: 3:23
- Label: A&M Octone; Polydor
- Songwriters: Dylan Alvarez; Matthew Busek; Jorel Decker; Jeff Halavacs; Jacob Kasher Hindlin; Daniel Murillo; George Ragan; Kevin Rudolf; Jordon Terrell
- Producers: Kevin Rudolf; Jeff Halavacs; Jacob Kasher

Hollywood Undead singles chronology
"Been to Hell" (2011)	"Coming Back Down" (2011)	"Comin' in Hot" (2011)

"Coming Back Down" is a song by American rap rock band Hollywood Undead. It is the third single from their second full-length album, American Tragedy, and the tenth track on that album. It is the band's ninth overall single in their discography. The track was released as a promotional single and free download on the band's official website on January 11, 2011. It was later released as a single on March 15, along with another single, "Been to Hell". A remix was featured on the band's American Tragedy Redux remix album.

== Background ==
The track was initially sent to radio stations on February 24, 2011, as a promotional single for their second album, American Tragedy. The unofficial track was soon leaked afterwards, with rumors of Kevin Rudolf being a featured artist. It was later revealed Rudolf was a producer for the track along with Jacob Kasher and Jeff Halavacs, with Don Gilmore as executive producer. On March 15, the band released the song as the third official single following "Hear Me Now", with "Been to Hell" also being released as a single the same day. As a video was shot for "Been to Hell", "Coming Back Down" has yet to receive a music video. Lyrically, "Coming Back Down" centers on the story of an unknown loved one who has recently died, with the narrator having difficulty trying to live without them. The chorus is sung by Danny, with the first verse being rapped by J-Dog and the second being rapped by Johnny 3 Tears. Johnny 3 Tears also sings the bridge.

A remix of the song by Beatnick and K-Salaam was included on the 2011 remix album American Tragedy Redux.

== Reception ==
A reviewer for SoCal Music Today praised the song and said that it "tugs at the heart strings as the boys take a step back from aggression to let out some raw emotion". A reviewer for Sputnik Music called the track one of the best moments of the album and felt that the combination of "Coming Back Down" along with "Bullet" and "Levitate" on the album created a "three song knockout". The track was praised for incorporating "acoustic guitars and a chorus that wouldn’t sound out of place on an All Time Low album, with a love-lorn summery atmosphere that feels warm and comfortable for the band". Brian Voerding noted that the song showed the band's strength in both singing and rapping while comparing the sound to Linkin Park, noting that, "The song bolsters the outfit as a force in rap rock with its sampled guitar riffs and swirling synths." Voerding also compared the production to that of Kid Rock mixed with pop-punk bands. He concluded by praising the lyrics, saying, "There's a spirituality in the lyrics, swollen with defeat, but rich with yearning. It's an allowance that however dark the day, the following may lighten."

Some reviewers were critical, however. One review from Revolver Magazine called the ballad "the weaker [point] in the record", despite having a positive review for the American Tragedy album as a whole.

== Personnel ==
Hollywood Undead

- Charlie Scene – lead guitar, composer
- Da Kurlzz – drums, percussion, composer
- Danny – clean vocals
- Funny Man – composer
- J-Dog – keyboards, synthesizers, piano, rhythm guitar, bass guitar, vocals, composer, additional production, engineering
- Johnny 3 Tears – vocals, composer

Production

- Don Gilmore – executive producer, recording, programming
- Kevin Rudolf – producer
- Jeff Halavacs – producer
- Jacob Kasher – producer

== Release history ==
Release dates and formats for "Coming Back Down"
Region	Date	Format	Label(s)	Ref.
United States	May 31, 2011	Mainstream airplay	Interscope	
