= Heart of a Champion =

Heart of a Champion may refer to:

- Heart of a Champion (album), an album by Paul Wall
- "Heart of a Champion" (song), a song by Nelly
- Heart of a Champion: The Ray Mancini Story, a 1985 film
- "Heart of a Champion" (Quantum Leap), a 1991 television episode
- "Heart of a Champion", a song by Hollywood Undead from the 2020 album New Empire, Vol. 1
