= Five (Hollywood Undead album) =

Studio album by Hollywood Undead
- Released: October 27, 2017
- Length: 52:23
- Labels: MDDN; BMG
- Producers: Sean Gould; Griffin Boice; Jorel "J-Dog" Decker; Jordon "Charlie Scene" Terrell

Hollywood Undead studio album chronology
Day of the Dead (2015)	Five (2017)	New Empire, Vol. 1 (2020)

Singles from Five
- 1. "California Dreaming" Released: July 24, 2017; 2. "Whatever It Takes" Released: August 25, 2017; 3. "Renegade" Released: September 29, 2017; 4. "We Own the Night" Released: October 13, 2017

Five (stylized as V) is the fifth studio album by American rap rock band Hollywood Undead. It was released on October 27, 2017 through MDDN and BMG. It is their first album recorded as a five-member band, as Matthew "Da Kurlzz" Busek departed the group in early 2017 was not replaced. It is also the first release for BMG Rights Management since they departed from Interscope Records, successor of A&M Octone Records, its first label they signed, after release of Day of the Dead. The album features guest vocal appearances from B-Real of Cypress Hill.

== Background ==
Vocalist Johnny 3 Tears spoke about the album title, stating "We’re five brothers, and this is our fifth record. Nothing gets to the essence of the music like this number does. Numerology has a lot of power. When we said Five, it just made sense. The fact that we could all agree on one word codifies who we are."

Even though it was not released as a single, the track "Riot" was certified three times platinum in Brazil by the PMB.

Professional ratings
Review scores
Source	Rating
AllMusic	3.5/5 stars
Distorted Sound	8/10
Express & Star	5/10 stars
Metal Hammer	3.5/5 stars

== Track listing ==
No.	Title	Writer(s)	Length
1.	"California Dreaming"	Sean Gould, Hollywood Undead	3:54
2.	"Whatever It Takes"	Hollywood Undead	3:07
3.	"Bad Moon"	J-Dog, Danny, Charlie Scene, Funny Man	3:52
4.	"Ghost Beach"	J-Dog, Danny	3:54
5.	"Broken Record"	Charlie Scene, Danny, Johnny 3 Tears	3:39
6.	"Nobody's Watching"	J-Dog, Danny	3:58
7.	"Renegade"	Courtney Ballard, Johnny 3 Tears, J-Dog, Funny Man	3:03
8.	"Black Cadillac" (featuring B-Real)	Funny Man, J-Dog, Johnny 3 Tears	3:47
9.	"Pray (Put 'Em in the Dirt)"	Griffin Boice, Johnny 3 Tears	4:24
10.	"Cashed Out"	Christian Dold, Funny Man, J-Dog, Charlie Scene	3:29
11.	"Riot"	Terrel	3:47
12.	"We Own the Night"	Gould, Hollywood Undead	4:02
13.	"Bang Bang"	Hollywood Undead	3:40
14.	"Your Life"	Ballard, Jarod Poythress, Danny, J-Dog, Charlie Scene, Johnny 3 Tears	3:25
Total length:			52:23

== Personnel ==
Credits adapted from AllMusic.

Hollywood Undead

- Jorel "J-Dog" Decker – vocals, guitars, bass, keyboards, programming, composition, producer
- Dylan "Funny Man" Alvarez – vocals, soundboards
- George "Johnny 3 Tears" Ragan – vocals, bass, composition
- Jordon "Charlie Scene" Terrell – vocals, guitars, composition, producer
- Daniel "Danny" Murillo – vocals, keyboards, programming, guitars, bass, composition

Additional musicians

- B-Real – guest vocals on "Black Cadillac"
- Oliver Clinger – additional vocals on "California Dreaming"
- Liam Clinger – additional vocals on "California Dreaming"
- MUSYCA Children's Choir – additional vocals on "California Dreaming"
- Tiah Barnes – additional vocals
- Kate Crellin – additional vocals
- Isabella Custino – additional vocals
- Ernest Harrison – additional vocals
- Da'jon James – additional vocals
- Dean Butterworth – drums on "California Dreaming", "We Own the Night" and "Bang Bang"
- Tommy Lee – drums on "Pray (Put 'Em in the Dirt)"
- Colin Schwanke – drums on "Renegade"
- Griffin Boice – guitars, piano, strings on "Pray (Put 'Em in the Dirt)", composition, producer
- Danny Lohner – guitars, bass on "Pray (Put 'Em in the Dirt)"
- Henry Flury – guitars on "Renegade"

Additional personnel

- Sean Gould – producer
- Jason Hradil – product manager
- Dan Lancaster – mixing
- Rhys May – mixing assistance
- Ted Jensen at Sterling Sound, NYC – mastering
- Courtney Ballard – composition
- Jared Poythress – composition
- James Knerr – A&R
- Randall Leddy – art direction, design
- Taylor Bringuel – photography
- Jack Stark – photography

== Charts ==
Chart (2017)	Peak position
Australian Albums (ARIA)	42
Austrian Albums (Ö3 Austria)	17
Belgian Albums (Ultratop Flanders)	82
Belgian Albums (Ultratop Wallonia)	159
Canadian Albums (Billboard)	11
Czech Albums (ČNS IFPI)	19
Finnish Albums (Suomen virallinen lista)	17
German Albums (Offizielle Top 100)	24
Hungarian Albums (MAHASZ)	26
New Zealand Heatseeker Albums (RMNZ)	5
Polish Albums (ZPAV)	40
Scottish Albums (Official Charts)	28
Slovak Albums (ČNS IFPI)	55
Swiss Albums (Schweizer Hitparade)	40
UK Albums (Official Charts)	31
US Billboard 200	22
US Top Alternative Albums (Billboard)	2
US Top Rock Albums (Billboard)	3
