= American Tragedy Redux =

Remix album by Hollywood Undead
- Released: November 21, 2011
- Recorded: June–December 2010; The Beat Suite; Hollywood, California; Remixed August–September 2011 at various locations
- Genre: Rap rock, dubstep, electronica
- Length: 47:49
- Label: A&M/Octone; Polydor; Universal Music Australia; Universal Music Group
- Producer: Don Gilmore (also exec.), Griffin Boice, Sam Hollander, Dave Katz, Kevin Rudolf, Jeff Halavacs, Jacob Kasher, Ben Grosse, Steve Cornish, Nick Mace, Jim Sullivan, Eddie Craig, Sidh Solanki, Andrew Krier, Beatnick, K-Salaam, Jonathan Davis, Asaf Borger, Dr. Eargasm, Erik Tinajero, David Gill, Joey Jensen, KMFDM, Kushaal Virdi

Hollywood Undead non-studio album chronology
American Tragedy (2011)	American Tragedy Redux (2011)	Notes from the Underground (2013)

Singles from American Tragedy Redux
- 1. "Levitate (Digital Dog Club Mix)" Released: October 18, 2011

American Tragedy Redux is the first remix album by American rap rock band Hollywood Undead. It is taking songs from the band's second studio album, American Tragedy, and remixing them. It was released on November 21, 2011, by A&M/Octone Records. The original tracks on the album were recorded following the induction of Daniel Murillo into the band in early 2010 and lasted until December. The tracks were then remixed by various DJs and musicians during the band's World War III Tour with Asking Alexandria later in 2011. The album's first single, "Levitate (Digital Dog Club Mix)", was released on October 18, 2011, with a music video being released on October 24.

== Background ==
Following the release of the band's second studio album, American Tragedy, the band announced a remix contest on August 11, 2011, where fans created their own remixes of the tracks "Le Deux" and "Bullet". The contest winner for the "Le Deux" was Dr. Eargasm, whose remix was chosen by the band and is featured on the album. The "Bullet" remix was voted as the best remix and was included on Redux as an iTunes bonus track. The band announced in October 2011 that a remix album, titled American Tragedy Redux, would be released on November 21, 2011 as their first remix album. The band created a series of online promotions for the album. First, they unlocked the track list and cover art for the album once the album title was tweeted 10,000 times on Twitter, which was accomplished by the end of the second day that the contest started. Then, the band released the first single, "Levitate (Digital Dog club mix)", on October 18 once the album art was shared 3,000 times on Facebook. A music video for "Levitate (Digital Dog club mix)" was released on October 24, 2011 through Virgin Mobile. The last Facebook unlock was a site for pre-ordering the album and ordering merchandise. The band also released the "Comin' In Hot (Wideboys Remix)" on the pre-order site. J-Dog said of the album, "This is our first remix record ever, we got to pick the DJs and re-mixers that the band really likes. Who would have thought that someone you grew up listening to would one day remix your song?"

Da Kurlzz gave an interview with The Phoenix New Times about the album where he states that many of the songs were influenced by older hip-hop and rock music like Nine Inch Nails, Beastie Boys, and Guru. Da Kurlzz felt that the popularity in dance and club music was surging and that inspired the band to create Redux, stating that the band was "paying attention not only to the rock, hip hop and pop scene, but the dance and DJ club scene is obviously blowing up once again. There's always new DJs remixing some really great artists, showing people that you can mix those genres together." Upon deciding which DJs and re-mixers to use for the album, Da Kurlzz stated that the band used decided specifically which of their songs would go best with each artist and how the remixed result would sound. He concluded by saying that they chose the artists, "not just because we like their music, but we also think that the sound will really be great for the certain songs that we choose." Da Kurlzz also stated that the band worked carefully with each artist during the remixing process to ensure the best songs for the album. He stated that the remix of "Hear Me Now" by Jonathan Davis, which was streamed by Revolver Magazine on November 14, was the most difficult but that "it ended up coming out great and we're really proud of it..." and that they were able to "go up to him and personally thank [Davis]."

Charlie Scene stated that the album came around from touring with several bands, like Asking Alexandria and Korn, and seeing their experiments with remixing songs. He added that, "it’s always cool to see [how] another artist interprets your music." When choosing remixers, Charlie Scene said, "Jonathan Davis was one of the people we met on tour and we know that he does remixes and that was actually one of the reasons and one of the ways we came up with the idea to doing a remix record." He noted that the music on the remix album is very different, reasoning this by stating, "There’s only [so] many rock bands that can come out with just guitars and singing over and over again and hardcore screaming... music has to change, it has to evolve with what's going on with society and kids. It's becoming more technical now, it's becoming more digital so I think rock music [is] going to have to become more digital."

== Reception ==
=== Critical reception ===
Professional ratings
Review scores
Source	Rating
AllMusic	2/5 stars

The Daily Blam gave a positive review of the album, noting that the band's sound lent well to remixing and that, "Hollywood Undead have managed to blend rock and hip hop without sounding like trend hoes." The choice in remixers was noted as well as the three opening tracks.

=== Accolades ===
Year	Nominated work	Award	Result	Place
2011	Hollywood Undead for "Levitate (Digital Dog club mix)"	WGRD's 2011 Favorite Listener Band of The Year	Won	1
"—" denotes a nomination that did not place or places were not relevant in the award.

== Commercial performance ==
Upon release, American Tragedy Redux charted on the US Hard Rock Albums chart and the Dance/Electronica Albums chart in its first week of release. It charted at number 15 on the Hard Rock and number nine on the Dance/Electronica charts, respectively. The original American Tragedy, which songs Redux remixed, also charted on the US Top Hard Rock Albums chart the same week that Redux debuted. American Tragedy charted at number 14, one spot higher than Redux.

== Track listing ==
All tracks are written and performed by Hollywood Undead, with specific writers detailed for each track. Each track remixed by various artists.

Standard Edition
No.	Title	Writer(s)	Producer(s)	Length
1.	"Levitate" (Digital Dog club mix)	Jorel Decker, Daniel Murillo, George Ragan, Jordon Terrell	Kevin Rudolf, Jacob Kasher, Steve Cornish, Nick Mace	7:15
2.	"Comin' in Hot" (Wideboys club mix)	Dylan Alvarez, Murillo, Terrell	Griffin Boice, Jim Sullivan, Eddie Craig	5:48
3.	"Apologize" (Buffalo Bill "Die Young" remix)	Decker, Murillo, Ragan, Matthew St. Claire, Terrell	Griffin Boice, Sidh Solanki	7:37
4.	"My Town" (Andrew W.K. remix)	Alvarez, Murillo, Ragan, St. Claire	Sam Hollander, Dave Katz, Andrew Krier	3:49
5.	"Coming Back Down" (Beatnick & K-Salaam remix)	Decker, Murillo, Ragan	Kevin Rudolf, Jeff Halavacs, Jacob Kasher, Beatnick, K-Salaam	3:13
6.	"Hear Me Now" (Jonathan Davis of Korn remix)	Decker, Murillo, Ragan	Sam Hollander, Dave Katz, Jonathan Davis	3:10
7.	"I Don't Wanna Die" (Borgore remix)	Decker, Murillo, Ragan, Terrell	Griffin Boice, Asaf Borger	4:29
8.	"Le Deux" (Dr. Eargasm remix)	Alvarez, Decker, Murillo, Ragan, Terrell	Griffin Boice, Dr. Eargasm	4:33
9.	"Lights Out" (The Juggernaut Vs. Obsidian remix)	Alvarez, Decker, Murillo, Terrell	Ben Grosse, Erik Tinajero, David Gill, Joey Jensen	4:25
10.	"Been to Hell... And Back!" (KMFDM remix)	Decker, Murillo, Ragan, Terrell	Don Gilmore, KMFDM	3:30
Total length:				47:49

iTunes Bonus Track
No.	Title	Writer(s)	Producer(s)	Length
11.	"Bullet" (Kay V remix)	Decker, Murillo, Ragan, Terrell,	Griffin Boice, Kushaal Virdi	3:19

== Personnel ==
Credits for American Tragedy Redux adapted from Allmusic, as well as American Tragedy.

=== Hollywood Undead ===
- Daniel "Danny" Murillo – vocals, keyboards
- Jordon "Charlie Scene" Terrell – vocals, lead guitar
- Jorel "J-Dog" Decker – vocals, rhythm guitar, bass guitar, keyboards, synthesizers, programming
- George "Johnny 3 Tears" Ragan – vocals
- Dylan "Funny Man" Alvarez – vocals
- Matthew "Da Kurlzz" St. Claire – vocals, drums, percussion

=== Additional personnel ===
- Don Gilmore – production, composer
- Griffin Boice – production, engineering, mixing, guitar, bass guitar, drums, percussion, organ, programming, strings
- Ben Grosse – production, engineering, mixing, keyboards, programming, composer
- Jeff Halavacs – production, guitar
- Kevin Rudolf – production, engineering, instrumentation, composer
- S*A*M – production, programming, composer
- James Diener – A&R
- Steve Cornish – production, remixing
- Nick Mace – production, remixing
- Jim Sullivan – production, remixing
- Eddie Craig – production, remixing
- Sidh Solanki – production, remixing
- Andrew Krier – production, remixing
- Beatnick – production, remixing
- K-Salaam – production, remixing
- Jonathan Davis – production, remixing
- Asaf Borger – production, remixing
- Dr. Eargasm – production, remixing
- Erik Tinajero – production, remixing
- David Gill – production, remixing
- Joey Jensen – production, remixing
- KMFDM – production, remixing
- Kay V – production, remixing

== Charts ==
=== Weekly charts ===
Chart (2011)	Peak position
US Top Dance/Electronica Albums	9
US Top Hard Rock Albums	15

== Release history ==
Region	Date	Label	Format	Catalog	Ref
European Union	November 21, 2011	Polydor	CD, Digital download	B005OBMNDC	
Japan	November 21, 2011	Universal	CD, Digital download	1624802	
United States	November 21, 2011	A&M/Octone	CD, Digital download	001624802	
