= Comin' in Hot =

Single by Hollywood Undead

from the album American Tragedy
- Released: April 9, 2011
- Recorded: May–December 2010
- Genre: Electronic rock; rap rock; alternative hip hop
- Length: 3:43
- Label: A&M Octone; Polydor
- Songwriters: Dylan Alvarez; Griffin Boice; Matthew Busek; Jorel Decker; Daniel Murillo; George Ragan; Jordon Terrell
- Producer: Griffin Boice

Hollywood Undead singles chronology
"Coming Back Down" (2011)	"Comin' in Hot" (2011)	"My Town" (2011)

Music video
- "Comin' in Hot" (Undead unhinged) on YouTube

"Comin' in Hot" is a song by American rap rock band Hollywood Undead. It is the fourth single from their second full-length album, American Tragedy, and the third track on that album. It is the band's tenth overall single in their discography. An alternate version of track was released as a promotional single in January and was released as a single on April 9, 2011, just after the release of the band's second album. A music video was also released the same day. A remix was featured on the band's American Tragedy Redux remix album.

== Background ==
An alternate version of the track was initially released for free on the band's Facebook as a promotional single for their second album, American Tragedy. In the alternate track, Charlie Scene and Funny Man have a different 2nd verse, and some of the instruments and synthesizers are louder than on the album-version of the song. On April 5, the band released the American Tragedy album. Four days later, on April 9, the song was released as the third official single following "Been to Hell" and "Coming Back Down". A music video was also released the same day.

A remix of the song by Wideboys was included on the 2011 remix album American Tragedy Redux.

== Music video ==
The official music video, co-directed by Kai Henry and Robert Corbi, was released on April 9, 2011. Sylvie Lesas of Evigshed noted that the previous music videos for the album, "Hear Me Now" and "Been to Hell", were dark and very serious, making the comical video for "Comin' in Hot" a change in tone. The video begins with western style opening credits then follows nearly two minutes of conversation prior to the music beginning. In a change for the band, a large portion of the video has the band performing without their masks. During the non-music portion, the video shows Funny Man, Charlie Scene, and J-Dog working the fields dressed as field workers and all adorning Mexican accents. They discuss poor working conditions and the need for a break before noticing that the field owner, played by Johnny 3 Tears, has three beautiful daughters dressed similarly to Daisy Duke. The three men covet the girls and the owner notices, warning them to get back to work before the music begins.

During the song, the lyrics are performed while the band is shown, still dressed in country attire, as working the field and roaming the farm for girls. The band is not shown in their normal masks and attire until the second verse. The band is shown to be performing on the same farm as the acted portion of the video. The band performs on plain ground with just bales of hay around them, with the camera rotating from a ground shot to an aerial shot at times. The chorus is sung by Danny, while the pre-chorus is sung by Charlie Scene. Charlie Scene raps the first verse while the second verse is rapped back and forth by Funny Man and Charlie Scene.

== Reception ==
The track was reviewed by Evigshed writer Sylvie Lesas on January 22, 2011. The writer called the track extremely convincing of the band's skill and fame. The reviewer gave "Comin' in Hot" a perfect ten out of ten score.

== Personnel ==
Hollywood Undead

- Charlie Scene – vocals, lead guitar, composer, clean vocals, additional production, engineering
- Da Kurlzz – drums, percussion
- Danny – clean vocals
- Funny Man – vocals
- J-Dog – keyboards, synthesizers, piano, rhythm guitar, bass guitar, composer, additional production, engineering
- Johnny 3 Tears – composer

Production

- Griffin Boice – producer
- Kai Henry – director
- Robert Corbi – director
