= We Are (Hollywood Undead song) =

Single by Hollywood Undead

from the album Notes from the Underground
- Released: 29 October 2012
- Recorded: December 2011 – September 2012
- Genre: Nu metal
- Length: 4:34 (album version); 3:58 (single version)
- Label: A&M Octone
- Songwriters: Dylan Alvarez; Matthew Busek; Jorel Decker; Danny Lohner; Daniel Murillo; George Ragan; Jordon Terrell
- Producers: Griffin Boice; Danny Lohner; S*A*M & Sluggo

Hollywood Undead singles chronology
| "Levitate" (Digital Dog Club Mix) (2011) | "We Are" (2012) | "Dead Bite" (2013) |

Music video
- "We Are" on YouTube

"We Are" is a song by American rap rock band Hollywood Undead. It is the first official single from the band's third studio album Notes from the Underground and was released as the fifth track on the album.

== Composition and lyrics ==
The song has vocals from several members of the band, with Danny singing the chorus, Johnny 3 Tears rapping the first verse, and J-Dog rapping the second verse; the final verse is screamed by J-Dog as well. A bridge is sung by both J-Dog and Danny. The song is often put next to the Swan Songs single Young by fans as it has similar vibes and meanings to the song.

The lyrics of the song were inspired by America's Youth quoted by Johnny 3 Tears, as he continues "...I feel a full-on empathy for what kids are going to have to go through cause it doesn’t seem to be getting any better. In fact, it seems quite the opposite. It’s pretty sickening sometimes, man."

== Music video ==
The official music video was released on 10 December, which was directed by Shawn ‘Clown’ Crahan, the percussionist of Slipknot. The music video has various different scenes happening, such as Da Kurlzz isolated in a fenced area being ignored by the crowds walking by, Funny Man robbing a liquor store, J-Dog burning pictures of each band member in a church, Danny smashing up televisions in front of a young and frightened girl, Johnny 3 Tears aligning what appears to be cocaine into the phrase "we are built from broken parts", and Charlie Scene setting a suited man on fire. Crahan made sure to add as many different things in the video to keep it visually interesting, and as he explains in the 'Behind the Scenes' video, and it also mentioned that the video was shot in California in what Danny describes "...the most haunted place in California..." which was later revealed in an interview with Charlie Scene by bloody-disgusting.com 'Linda Vista Hospital'.

=== New masks ===
This music video was also the first video by the band to include the latest masks at the time:

- J-Dog: A white mask with two gas mask filters on the cheeks with a Dollar symbol, glowing red eyes, and God's all-seeing eye on his forehead.
- Johnny 3 Tears: Left side of his mask consists of the number 3 and his right consists of butterflies with a black background as before, but this mask has a mosaic design added.
- Charlie Scene: Dark grey bandanna with matte black spectacles, same as before.
- Funny Man: A black cloth mask with silver outlining, similar to a Lucha Libre mask. It resembles a gorilla, and has three dots on the right cheek, as well as his initials FM on the forehead.
- Da Kurlzz: Left side of his mask is white with an angry scowl, right side appears to resemble burnt lava.
- Danny: Mask seems more metal plated, and the Latin cross on his eye has been replaced with bullets.

=== Lyric video ===
Prior to the release of the single, a lyric video was published on Hollywood Undead's official YouTube channel on 29 October, a day before the single was released onto iTunes. The video, as well as providing the lyrics of the song, has various clip scenes of advertisements and urban landscapes, from skyscrapers to rubble.

=== Reviews ===
"We Are" was met with positive reviews; Aristdistrict gave it a 10 out of 10.

== Charts ==
| Chart (2012) | Peak position |
|---|---|
| US Rock Songs (Billboard) | 33 |

== Certifications ==
| Region | Certification | Certified units/sales |
|---|---|---|
| United States (RIAA) | Gold | 500,000^{‡} |
^{‡} Sales+streaming figures based on certification alone.
