= Miss Willie Brown =

American country music duo

- Origin: Nashville, Tennessee, United States
- Genres: Country
- Years active: 2007-2013
- Labels: A&M/Octone
- Members: Kasey Buckley; Amanda Watkins
- Website: misswilliebrown.com

Miss Willie Brown was an American country music duo consisting of Amanda Watkins and Kasey Buckley, who are respectively natives of West Virginia and Texas but met in California. They are signed to A&M/Octone Records, to which they were the first group signed.

The duo performed on Jimmy Kimmel Live! in 2011 before their signing. Afterward, they began working with producer Keith Stegall on their debut album. They also toured with Dierks Bentley and Josh Thompson and released a self-titled extended play. Debut single "Sick of Me" did not enter the charts, but its followup, "You're All That Matters to Me", was made into a music video and charted in August 2012. Miss Willie Brown performed "You're All That Matters to Me" and "Sick of Me" on The CW's Hart of Dixie on April 9, 2012 in the episode "Always on My Mind".

On April 16, 2013, the duo announced on their Facebook page that they were dissolving the group with Watkins pursuing a solo career and Buckley taking a break from music.

== Discography ==
=== Extended plays ===
Title	Album details
Blackouts and Polaroids	Release date: 2008; Label: Self-released; Format: Extended play
Miss Willie Brown	Release date: March 15, 2011; Label: A&M/Octone Records; Format: Digital EP

=== Singles ===
Year	Single	Peak chart positions		Album
Year	Single	US Country	US Country Airplay	Album
2011	"Sick of Me"	—	—	Miss Willie Brown
2012	"You're All That Matters to Me"	43	43	Bonafide (unreleased)
"—" denotes releases that did not chart

=== Music videos ===
Year	Video	Director
2012	"You're All That Matters to Me"	TK McKamy
