= American Tragedy (album) =

Studio album by Hollywood Undead
- Released: April 4, 2011
- Recorded: June–December 2010
- Studios: The Beat Suite, Hollywood
- Genre: Rap rock
- Length: 50:41
- Label: A&M Octone
- Producers: Don Gilmore (also exec.); Griffin Boice; Kevin Rudolf; Jeff Halatrax; S*A*M & Sluggo; Ben Grosse

Hollywood Undead studio album chronology
Swan Songs (2008)	American Tragedy (2011)	Notes from the Underground (2013)

Singles from American Tragedy
- 1. "Hear Me Now" Released: December 21, 2010; 2. "Been to Hell" Released: March 15, 2011; 3. "Coming Back Down" Released: March 15, 2011; 4. "Comin' in Hot" Released: April 9, 2011; 5. "My Town" Released: April 4, 2011; 6. "Bullet" Released: August 10, 2011; 7. "Levitate" Released: December 6, 2011

American Tragedy is the second studio album by American rap rock band Hollywood Undead. It is their first album to feature vocalist Danny Murillo, who replaced Deuce. Production for the album began following Murillo's induction into the band in early 2010 and lasted until December. Don Gilmore and Ben Grosse, who helped produce the band's debut album, Swan Songs (2008), also returned to produce the album along with several other producers including Kevin Rudolf, Sam Hollander, Dave Katz, Griffin Boice, Jeff Halavacs, and Jacob Kasher. The album is musically heavier and features darker lyrical content than the band's previous effort. Originally set to release in March, American Tragedy was released on April 5, 2011 in the United States and was released on various other dates that month in other countries. A remix of the album, American Tragedy Redux, was released on November 21, 2011.

The album debuted at number four on the US Billboard 200, selling approximately 67,000 copies in its first week in the United States, and ended up becoming the 142nd best selling album of 2011 in the US. It also charted in a few other countries, including Canada and the UK, a first for the band. The album also had five singles: "Hear Me Now", "Been to Hell", "Coming Back Down", "Comin' in Hot", and "My Town", with music videos being made for all of them except "Coming Back Down" as it was released on the same day as "Been to Hell". The band participated in three headlining tours: the Revolt Tour, the Endless Summer Tour, and the World War III Tour, as well as other supporting tours throughout 2011 to promote the album. Upon release, American Tragedy received mixed reviews. Critics consistently noted the darker and more serious tone of the album, but to mixed reception. Lyrics were widely criticized while the energy and instruments were praised in most reviews.

== Background and promotion ==
The band performing in the "Been To Hell" music video. From left to right: J-Dog, Johnny 3 Tears, Da Kurlzz, Charlie Scene, Danny, Daren Pfeifer (touring member), and Funny Man.

To promote the album, the band participated in three headlining tours and several other supporting tours. The first headlining tour, the Revolt Tour, began on April 6 and spanned across the spring until May 27, playing with Drive-A, New Medicine, 10 Years, and others at various House of Blues venues across North America. The second headlining tour for the album was the Endless Summer Tour with All That Remains and Hyro Da Hero which began in Pittsburgh, Pennsylvania, and ended in Knoxville, Tennessee. The third tour was the World War III Tour, which the band called the biggest tour they had done yet. The tour was co-headlined with Asking Alexandria with support acts We Came As Romans, D.R.U.G.S., and Borgore, with different local openers for each location. For supporting tours, the band began with the Nightmare After Christmas Tour with headliners Avenged Sevenfold and supporters Stone Sour and New Medicine on January 20, 2011, which was the first supporting tour for the album. The band also supported the Buried Alive Tour with headliner Avenged Sevenfold and supporters Asking Alexandria and Black Veil Brides on November 19, 2011. Outside of official tours, the band played several festivals throughout 2011 including UFEST in Mesa, Arizona, Rockfest, and Summerfest in Milwaukee, Wisconsin. The band also played various holiday shows, such as a Cinco De Mayo show in Salt Lake City, Utah, with Flogging Molly and others.

The album spawned five singles in total. On December 8, 2010, the band released the artwork for the album's first single, titled "Hear Me Now". The track was released on December 13 for radio and was made available online a week later on December 21. "Hear Me Now" was the album's most successful single, charting variously on the Billboard Heatseeker charts, Alternative charts, and the Rock charts. On March 22, the band appeared live on the late night talk show Lopez Tonight as a musical guest where they performed the single "Hear Me Now" to promote the album. The band reportedly almost drank the entire bar behind the Turner Broadcasting System set, with George Lopez saying to J-Dog, "Drink all of it. Go ahead, I don't care. But I've never seen anyone drink that much." The album's second and third official singles, "Been to Hell" and "Coming Back Down", were both released on March 15, 2011. "Been to Hell" was previously released as a promotional single with a lyric video on February 6, but was then released as a single with a music video, leading to it chart on Billboard's Heatseeker and Bubbling Under Hot 100 charts. Because "Coming Back Down" was released on the same day as "Been to Hell", the track did not get a music video. "Coming Back Down" previously surfaced due to a leak on February 18 and was later confirmed to be on the album and was produced by Kevin Rudolf. Brian Voerding noted that the song showed the band's strength in both singing and rapping while comparing the sound to Linkin Park. The album's fourth single, "Comin' in Hot", was released on April 9 with a music video to celebrate the album's release. Similar to "Been to Hell", "Comin' in Hot" was originally a free promotional single released on January 21, but was later released as an album single following the release of American Tragedy. The track was reviewed by Evigshed along with "Hear Me Now" after it was released as a promotional single, who gave both "Comin' in Hot" and "Hear Me Now" a perfect ten out of ten score, noting that "Comin' in Hot" was much more upbeat and was extremely catchy. On July 8, it was announced the fifth single for the album would be "My Town". The band began shooting the music video in early July and announced that fans would be featured in the video if they recorded themselves performing the song in front of a famous landmark. The video has no release date yet.

== Composition ==
=== Influences, style and themes ===
American Tragedy opens with the single "Been to Hell". J-Dog said that the song is, "the truth about what really happens to people when they move to L.A., to be actors or models or God knows what other delusions people have... failure. It's all too true, but most people aren't there to see it first-hand. But we are, so it's our interpretation of it all." The track is followed by "Apologize", a track that directly addresses critics and states the band's defiance in the face of negative opinions, as evident by the chorus, "We don't apologize and that's just the way it is, but we can harmonize even if we sound like shit." Third is "Comin' in Hot", a party song and the album's fourth single that uses humor to describe what happens in night clubs. "My Town" is the fifth single and a mid-tempo song talking about Los Angeles and Hollywood. Next is "I Don't Wanna Die", a song about the fear of death fueling the need to kill another person. "Hear Me Now" was the lead single from the album and is about the troubles each band member was going through at the time the song was written. The song's lyrics tell the story of a person who is depressed and hopeless, taking a very somber tone to the track. Despite this, the instruments and melodies contrast to make an uptempo track. Next is "Gangsta Sexy", a party anthem song about heading to nightclubs and pursuing women. The following track, "Glory", is a metal-inspired song which drew influence from war and fighting. "Lights Out", the ninth song on the album, is about Deuce, ex-vocalist of Hollywood Undead. It is a response to "Story of a Snitch". "Coming Back Down", the third single released from the album, is a rock ballad song with acoustic guitars on the track. The lyrics describes about a story of an unknown loved one who has recently died, with the narrator having difficulty trying to live without them. "Bullet", the eleventh track from the album, is a song about suicide. It is played in an upbeat tempo with energetic vocals, which gives contrast to the dark lyrical content. Rick Florino called the track, "heart-wrenching genius". "Levitate" is an uptempo discothèque song about sex, while the verses of the song talk about suicide and alcoholism. It was also featured in the Need For Speed: Shift 2 Unleashed trailer, "Autolog Drift Challenge", as well as on the game's soundtrack, where it was ranked eighth on ProGamist's list of "Top ten songs featured in racing games".

"Pour Me", the last soft song on the album, is a dark ballad that has been often compared to Eminem's "Stan". Johnny 3 Tears stated that, "We were messing around with chord progressions and that came out like a more major chord style than we were used to it. It's melodic and poppy sounding. We're talking about drinking obviously because all of us sometimes drink too much. It's one of those basic every day things that people go through but they don't know how to voice it or others around them don't know to voice it. It's almost like you're looked down upon, but no one actually talks about it." "Tendencies", which is the closing track for the standard edition of the album, is a high tempo alternative metal song about murder. Johnny 3 Tears said, "When we wrote Tendencies, I wanted to make a song that kids would just go nuts to when we played it. Kids start moshpits at our shows. Not every song we have is the best mosh song, so I wanted to make a song kids could go crazy for."

While the band was touring with Avenged Sevenfold, the guitarist Synyster Gates spoke about "S.C.A.V.A." stating "Holy shit, that's the craziest verse I've ever heard! The lyrics are insane."

== Reception ==
Professional ratings
Aggregate scores
Source	Rating
Metacritic	59/100
Review scores
Source	Rating
AllMusic	2/5 stars
Artistdirect	5/5 stars
Billboard	68%
Los Angeles Times	2/5 stars
The Minaret Online	4.5/5 stars
Revolver	4/5 stars

=== Critical reception ===
According to the review aggregator Metacritic, American Tragedy received "mixed or average reviews" based on a weighted average score of 59 out of 100 from 6 critic scores.

Rick Florino of Artistdirect gave American Tragedy 5 out of 5, particularly praising the band's choice to avoid duplicating their debut album, Swan Songs, and instead choosing to create a, "darker, deeper, and far deadlier ride this time around." Florino compared various elements of the album to the Wu Tang Clan and Nine Inch Nails, particularly comparing the album's production (which was done by various producers with executive producer Don Gilmore) to Nine Inch Nails' second album The Downward Spiral (1994). He also lauded the irony of the quality singing on, "Apologize", combined with the lyrics, "But we can harmonize, even if we sound like shit." Florino concluded that, "Hollywood Undead's genius lies—in that dangerous space between unforgettable and unsettling," pointing this out in the track, "Bullet", for it being the, "sunniest and catchiest tune on American Tragedy," while still telling, "a potent and poignant tale of longing for suicide." The other track Florino pointed out for being unforgettable is, "Pour Me", calling it, "an evil power ballad that everyone who hears it will feel."

Revolver magazine reviewer Jeremy Borjon gave the album four out of five in his review, calling American Tragedy, "one hell of an album that will leave fans’ heads buzzing long after the clubs have let out and the hangover sets in." Borjon complimented the shift in moods throughout the album and the lyrical quality compared to Swan Songs. He praised several tracks including "Been to Hell", "Apologize", "Comin' in Hot", "Bullet", "Levitate", and "Tendencies" as numerous outstanding points in the album. Borjon did criticize the slower songs, "Coming Back Down" and "Pour Me" but dismissed that that were, "easily forgotten among the album's many undeniably addictive future hits." Richard Solomon of The Minaret proclaimed that, "If you're a Hollywood Undead fan, you'll love American Tragedy. As for people who didn't care for Swan Songs, you'll probably still love American Tragedy." Instrumentally, Solomon noted one of his only complaints of the album, being that, "At times, the synthesizer seems a little too heavy handed, but it succeeds more often than not." Solomon complimented the album being different and further encouraged the Deluxe Edition tracks in addition to the album itself.

Mikael Wood of the Los Angeles Times was more critical in his review. He praised the energy of the album, pointing out the, "Booming groove," of "Apologize", and the "disco-metal urgency," of "Levitate". Wood's biggest complaint of the album was that the band has, "filtered out any sense of humor from its music, which makes American Tragedy virtually impossible to listen to for longer than a few songs at a time." Alistair Lawrence of BBC Music said that the album is, "The result is that they've ditched some of the early, growling quirkiness that at least gave them an initial, oddball appeal." Lawrence finishes his review noting, "Hollywood Undead are content to deliver clichés – more out of a lack of imagination than cynical opportunism, but it still smacks of both. That's why to seasoned ears or any genre fan requiring more than more of the same, they're very, very boring."

=== Accolades ===
Accolades for American Tragedy
Year	Nominated work	Award	Result	Place
2011	"Been to Hell"	AOL Radio: Top 10 Rock Songs of 2011	Won	5th
"—" denotes a nomination that did not place or places were not relevant in the award.

== Commercial performance ==
Prior to release, American Tragedy was projected by several publications to sell about 65,000 copies in the first week of release in the United States, and was expected to reach number three on the Billboard 200. When the official sales week ended, the album exceeded expectations and sold about 67,000 copies, but was outsold by Radiohead's The King of Limbs and so debuted at number four on the Billboard 200. Weekly sales topped albums such as Wiz Khalifa's Rolling Papers and Chris Brown's F.A.M.E., and was right behind Adele's 21, Britney Spears's Femme Fatale, and Radiohead's The King of Limbs.

Upon learning of the album's first-week sales, Jordon Terrell, also known to fans of the band as "Charlie Scene." jokingly remarked, "I gotta be honest with everyone: I was really looking forward to the opportunity to be on top of Britney this week, but being right behind her and Adele is a memory we'll relish forever." The album also debuted at number one on the US Hard Rock charts, number two on the US Rock, Digital, and Alternative charts, and number 11 on the Tastemaker Albums charts. Outside of the US, American Tragedy charted number five in Canadian albums charts and number 43 in the UK albums charts.

== Track listing ==
All tracks are written and performed by Hollywood Undead, with specific writers detailed for each track.

Standard Edition
No.	Title	Writer(s)	Producer(s)	Length
1.	"Been to Hell"	Matthew Busek, Jorel Decker, Daniel Murillo, George Ragan, Jordon Terrell	Don Gilmore	3:23
2.	"Apologize"	Busek, Decker, Murillo, Ragan, Terrell	Griffin Boice	3:27
3.	"Comin' in Hot"	Dylan Alvarez, Murillo, Terrell	Griffin Boice	3:43
4.	"My Town"	Alvarez, Busek, Murillo, Ragan	Sam Hollander, Dave Katz	3:36
5.	"I Don't Wanna Die"	Murillo, Ragan, Terrell	Griffin Boice	3:59
6.	"Hear Me Now"	Decker, Murillo, Ragan, Terrell	Sam Hollander, Dave Katz	3:34
7.	"Gangsta Sexy"	Alvarez, Busek, Murillo, Terrell	Don Gilmore	3:54
8.	"Glory"	Busek, Decker, Murillo, Ragan	Don Gilmore	3:34
9.	"Lights Out"	Alvarez, Busek, Decker, Murillo, Terrell	Ben Grosse	3:51
10.	"Coming Back Down"	Decker, Murillo, Ragan	Kevin Rudolf, Jeff Halavacs, Jacob Kasher	3:23
11.	"Bullet"	Decker, Murillo, Ragan, Terrell	Griffin Boice	3:18
12.	"Levitate"	Decker, Murillo, Ragan, Terrell	Kevin Rudolf, Jacob Kasher	3:24
13.	"Pour Me"	Murillo, Ragan	Don Gilmore	4:03
14.	"Tendencies"	Busek, Decker, Murillo, Ragan	Griffin Boice	3:32
Total length:				50:41

Deluxe Edition
No.	Title	Writer(s)	Length
15.	"Mother Murder"	Murillo, Ragan, Terrell	4:10
16.	"Lump Your Head"	Alvarez, Busek, Decker, Murillo, Ragan, Terrell	3:37
17.	"Le Deux"	Alvarez, Decker, Murillo, Terrell	3:45
18.	"S.C.A.V.A."	Busek, Murillo, Ragan	4:04
Total length:			66:17

Japanese Bonus Track
No.	Title	Writer(s)	Producer(s)	Length
19.	"Undead" (live)	Busek, Decker, Aron Erlichman, Ragan, Terrell	Erlichman, Danny Lohner	4:48
Total length:				71:05

Japanese Bonus DVD
No.	Title	Length
1.	"Hear Me Now" (music video)	3:47
2.	"No. 5" (music video)	3:22
3.	"Undead" (censored version) (music video)	3:14
4.	"Young" (music video)	3:35
5.	"Everywhere I Go" (music video)	4:06
Total length:		17:24

iTunes Bonus Track
No.	Title	Writer(s)	Producer(s)	Length
19.	"Street Dreams"	Busek, Decker, Murillo, Ragan, Terrell	Don Gilmore	4:04
Total length:				70:21

iTunes Pre-order Bonus Tracks
No.	Title	Writer(s)	Producer(s)	Length
20.	"Comin' in Hot" (instrumental)	Alvarez, Murillo, Terrell	Griffin Boice	3:43
21.	"Apologize" (instrumental)	Alvarez, Busek, Murillo, Ragan, Terrell	Griffin Boice	3:27
Total length:				77:31

== Personnel ==
Hollywood Undead

- Daniel "Danny" Murillo – lead vocals
- Jorel "J-Dog" Decker – rap vocals (tracks 1–2, 4, 6, 8–10, 12, and 14; bonus track 16), piano (track 14)
- Matthew "Da Kurlzz" Busek – hype vocals (tracks 1–2, 4, 9, and 14; bonus tracks 16 and 18–19)
- Dylan "Funny Man"/"King Kong" Alvarez – rap vocals (tracks 1, 3–4, 7, and 9; bonus tracks 16–17)
- George "Johnny 3 Tears" Ragan – rap vocals (tracks 1–2, 4–6, 8, and 10–14; bonus tracks 15–16 and 18–19)
- Jordon "Charlie Scene" Terrell – vocals (tracks 1–7, 9, and 11–12; bonus tracks 15–17 and 19), guitars (tracks 1 and 11)

Production

- Don Gilmore – production, composer
- Griffin Boice – production, engineering, mixing, guitars, bass, drums, percussion, organ, programming, strings
- Ben Grosse – production, engineering, mixing, keyboards, programming, composer
- Jeff Halatrax – production, guitars
- Kevin Rudolf – production, engineering, instrumentation, composer
- S*A*M – production, programming, composer
- Sean Gould – engineering, mixing, guitars, bass, programming
- Ken Dudley – engineering
- Paul Pavao – engineering
- Mark Kiczula – engineering
- Jeremy Miller – assistant engineer
- Grant Michaels – assistant engineer, programming
- Graham Hargrove – assistant engineer
- Sean Curiel – drum engineering
- Dylan Dresdow – mixing
- Serban Ghenea – mixing
- John Hanes – mixing
- Jaime Martinez – mixing assistant
- Tim Roberts – mixing assistant
- Jonas Åkerlund – photography
- Jeff Janke – photography
- Rogelio Hernandez II – art direction, design
- James Diener – A&R

== Charts ==
=== Weekly charts ===
Weekly chart performance for American Tragedy
Chart (2011)	Peak position
Canadian Albums (Billboard)	5
Scottish Albums (Official Charts)	40
UK Albums (Official Charts)	43
US Billboard 200	4
US Top Alternative Albums (Billboard)	2
US Top Hard Rock Albums (Billboard)	1
US Top Rock Albums (Billboard)	2

=== Year-end charts ===
Year-end chart performance for American Tragedy
Chart (2011)	Position
US Billboard 200	142
US Top Rock Albums (Billboard)	26

== Certifications ==
Certifications for American Tragedy
Region	Certification	Certified units/sales
United Kingdom (BPI)	Silver	60,000^{‡}
United States (RIAA)	Gold	500,000^{‡}
^{‡} Sales+streaming figures based on certification alone.

== Release history ==
Release dates and formats for American Tragedy
Region	Date	Label	Format	Catalog	Ref
Europe	April 4, 2011	Polydor	CD, Digital download	B004NTVMRY	
Europe	April 4, 2011	Polydor	Deluxe edition CD and digital download	B004QHBMZK	
United States	April 5, 2011	A&M/Octone	CD, Digital download	15275	
United States	April 5, 2011	A&M/Octone	Deluxe edition CD and digital download	2762142	
Australia	April 8, 2011	Universal Music Australia	Deluxe edition CD and digital download	00602527621425	
Japan	April 13, 2011	Universal	CD, Digital download	UICA1058	
Japan	April 13, 2011	Universal	Deluxe edition CD and digital download	UICA9031	
