= Hotel Kalifornia =

Studio album by Hollywood Undead
- Released: August 12, 2022
- Genre: Rap metal; hip-hop; rap rock; nu metal
- Length: 43:34
- Label: Dove & Grenade Media; BMG
- Producer: No Love for the Middle Child

Hollywood Undead studio album chronology
New Empire, Vol. 2 (2020)	Hotel Kalifornia (2022)

Singles from Hotel Kalifornia
- 1. "Chaos" Released: February 25, 2022; 2. "Wild in These Streets" Released: April 20, 2022; 3. "City of the Dead" Released: June 8, 2022; 4. "Trap God" Released: July 8, 2022; 5. "Evil" Released: March 1, 2023; 6. "Salvation" Released: March 29, 2023; 7. "House of Mirrors" Released: April 25, 2023

Hotel Kalifornia is the eighth studio album by American rap rock band Hollywood Undead. It was released on August 12, 2022 through Dove & Grenade Media and BMG. The album was produced by No Love for the Middle Child.

== Background and promotion ==
On September 5, 2021, the band announced that they were working on new music for their upcoming eighth studio album. On February 25, 2022, a few months after the announcement, the band released the first single "Chaos". On April 20, the band unveiled second single "Wild in These Streets" and its corresponding music video.

On June 8, the band released the third single "City of the Dead". At the same time, they officially announced the album itself while also revealed the album cover, the track list and release date. On July 8, one month before the album release, the band unveiled the fourth single "Trap God". On March 1, 2023, the band released the fifth single "Evil" while also announcing the deluxe edition of the album which is set for release on April 28. On March 29, the band premiered the sixth single "Salvation". On April 25, the band published the seventh single "House of Mirrors" featuring Jelly Roll along with a music video.

== Critical reception ==
Professional ratings
Review scores
Source	Rating
AllMusic	3.5/5 stars
Distorted Sound	8/10
Metal Hammer	3.5/5 stars
New Noise	4/5 stars
Wall of Sound	7/10

The album received mostly positive reviews from critics. Writing for Metal Hammer, Nik Young calls the album "...an honest, confident and catchy release that winds up oddly hard to resist." New Noise gave the album 4 out of 5 and stated: "All in all, Hotel Kalifornia is an outstanding piece of work that is sure to keep fans entertained the whole way through." Wall of Sound gave the album a score 7/10 and saying: "While Hotel Kalifornia probably isn't going to win over any new fans, it is a consistently fresh addition of their bouncy nu-metal style that'll have you up on your feet as you crank up the volume to the limit. If you've enjoyed their previous albums, there's a pretty good chance of you giving this a go on your weekend drives outta town."

== Commercial performance ==
Hotel Kalifornia debuted at number 149 on the US Billboard 200 and number 24 on the Top Rock Albums selling 6,000 pure album sales in its first week.

== Track listing ==
Hotel Kalifornia track listing
No.	Title	Length
1.	"Chaos"	3:02
2.	"World War Me"	3:10
3.	"Ruin My Life"	3:03
4.	"Hourglass"	2:43
5.	"Go to War"	2:46
6.	"Alone at the Top"	3:45
7.	"Wild in These Streets"	3:24
8.	"Dangerous"	3:24
9.	"Lion Eyes"	2:58
10.	"Trap God"	3:04
11.	"Happy When I Die"	2:32
12.	"Reclaim"	3:14
13.	"City of the Dead"	2:53
14.	"Alright"	3:29
Total length:		43:34

Deluxe edition
No.	Title	Length
15.	"Evil"	2:43
16.	"Salvation"	3:35
17.	"First Class Suicide"	3:07
18.	"Ransom"	3:20
19.	"Break on Through"	3:09
20.	"House of Mirrors" (featuring Jelly Roll)	3:25
Total length:		62:53

Notes

- Track 1 is stylized in all caps.

== Personnel ==
Hollywood Undead

- Jorel "J-Dog" Decker – vocals, guitars, bass, keyboards, programming, composition
- Dylan "Funny Man" Alvarez – vocals, composition
- George "Johnny 3 Tears" Ragan – vocals, bass, composition
- Jordon "Charlie Scene" Terrell – vocals, guitars, composition
- Daniel "Danny" Murillo – vocals, keyboards, programming, guitars, bass, composition

Additional musicians

- Greg Garman – drums
- Jelly Roll – guest vocals on track 20

Additional personnel

- No Love for the Middle Child – production
- Drew Fulk – production, composition on track 1
- Erik Ron – production, composition on track 7
- Andrew Migliore – production, composition on track 7
- Zakk Cervini and Chris Athens – engineering
- Michael Futterer – composition

== Charts ==
Chart performance for Hotel Kalifornia
Chart (2022)	Peak position
German Albums (Offizielle Top 100)	51
UK Album Sales (OCC)	70
UK Digital Albums (OCC)	25
UK Independent Albums (OCC)	21
UK Rock & Metal Albums (OCC)	7
US Billboard 200	149
US Top Rock Albums (Billboard)	24
