= Day of the Dead (Hollywood Undead album) =

Studio album by Hollywood Undead
- Released: March 31, 2015
- Recorded: 2014
- Genre: Rap rock; alternative rock; electronic rock; hip hop; nu metal
- Length: 46:13
- Label: Interscope
- Producer: Griffin Boice; Sean Gould; Jordon "Charlie Scene" Terrell; Jorel "J-Dog" Decker

Hollywood Undead studio album chronology
Notes from the Underground (2013)	Day of the Dead (2015)	Five (2017)

Singles from Day of the Dead
- 1. "Day of the Dead" Released: October 21, 2014; 2. "Usual Suspects" Released: February 17, 2015; 3. "Gravity" Released: February 23, 2015; 4. "How We Roll" Released: March 9, 2015; 5. "Live Forever" Released: March 23, 2015; 6. "Disease" Released: March 27, 2015; 7. "War Child" Released: March 31, 2015

Day of the Dead is the fourth studio album by American rap rock band Hollywood Undead. Originally set to be released October 2014, the album was released March 31, 2015, on Interscope Records. It is the band's final album recorded as a six-member band, as Matthew "Da Kurlzz" Busek departed Hollywood Undead in early 2017. It is also their last to be released on Interscope.

== Release and promotion ==
To promote the new album, the band embarked on the Album Release tour, beginning March 9, 2014 in Philadelphia, Pennsylvania, and ending on March 30 in Los Angeles, California. Fans that purchased tickets received access to a digital download of the album (including every single released before the album's arrival). Prior to the release of the first single, it was hyped up through social media websites such as Facebook, Instagram, and Twitter. On October 21, 2014, the first single from the album, "Day of the Dead", was released through Revolver Magazine. The name of the album was also revealed, being the same as the single.

It was announced that the album would be available for preorder on February 17, along with the release of the second song from the album, "Usual Suspects".

The single called "Gravity" was released on February 23. Leading up to the new CD's release, the band would unveil five new tracks from the album every Tuesday, which began with "Usual Suspects" on February 17. March 3 being an exception, where instead the band was to release the music video for "Day of the Dead". However, it was delayed to March 17, 2015 and several song samples were released March 7.

"How We Roll" was released as a single on March 9, a day earlier to make up for the delayed release of the "Day of the Dead" music video which was released on March 16. After "How We Roll", their songs were released on Mondays "Live Forever" on March 17, and "Disease" was released as a single on March 23. "War Child" was released on March 27.

The band released songs every week beginning with "Usual Suspects". Additionally, they put a band member's new mask on the artwork for each single with Johnny 3 Tears on "Usual Suspects", Danny on "Gravity", J-Dog on "How We Roll", Funny Man on "Live Forever" and Da Kurlzz on "Disease".

The band also undertook an album release tour throughout the month of March in the US, culminating back home in Los Angeles on March 31.

After the release of their fourth and new album, Day of the Dead, J-Dog, Charlie Scene, and Johnny 3 Tears spoke about their inspiration and stories on how they began work for the new album. In an interview J-Dog shared the story behind their new track "Usual Suspects" on how they began to drink in the recording studio. They eventually go down to a 7-Eleven near the studio to buy big gulp cups of ice filled with orange juice and champagne. By this point they were completely intoxicated as they walked down Sunset Blvd practically drinking mimosas. The band started writing lyrics about the Sunset Strip when suddenly Johnny 3 Tears started talking weird about losing his mind, the band quickly began writing lyrics on it. At the end, the band felt that the song came out feel like an old school Hollywood Undead song. The inspiration for the song title came from the famous phrase line, "Round up the usual suspects", from the classic 1942 film Casablanca. J-Dog also addressed critics saying that they are still the same band since they started back in 2005 and in no way have changed.

Professional ratings
Review scores
Source	Rating
AllMusic	3/5 stars
Evigshed	8.6/10
Kerrang!	2/5 Ks
Metal Hammer	2/10
aNewRisingMusic	3/5 stars
Ultimate Guitar	5.4/10

== Track listing ==
Standard Edition
No.	Title	Writer(s)	Producer	Length
1.	"Usual Suspects"	Dylan Alvarez, Matthew Busek, Jorel Decker, Gould, Daniel Murillo, George Ragan, Jordon Terrell	Sean Gould, George Ragan	3:44
2.	"How We Roll"	Alvarez, Busek, Decker, Gould, Murillo, Ragan, Terrell	Decker, Gould, Danny Lohner	4:45
3.	"Day of the Dead"	Busek, Decker, Gould, Murillo, Ragan, Terrell	Gould, Terrell	3:55
4.	"War Child"	Alvarez, Decker, Murillo, Terrell	Gould, Matt Squire, Terrell	3:58
5.	"Dark Places"	Busek, Decker, Murillo, Ragan, Terrell	Decker	4:39
6.	"Take Me Home"	Griffin Boice, Murillo, Terrell	Boice, Terrell	3:48
7.	"Gravity"	Alvarez, Busek, Decker, Gould, Murillo, Ragan, Terrell	Gould, Murillo	3:19
8.	"Does Everybody in the World Have to Die"	Boice, Decker, Ragan	Boice	3:17
9.	"Disease"	Busek, Decker, Gould, Murillo, Ragan, Terrell	Busek, Gould, Lohner	3:31
10.	"Party by Myself"	Alvarez, Boice, Terrell	Boice	4:10
11.	"Live Forever"	Alvarez, Decker, Gould, Murillo, Ragan, Terrell	Alvarez, Gould	3:40
12.	"Save Me"	Alvarez, Busek, Decker, Murillo, Ragan	Boice, Murillo	3:27
Total length:				46:13

Deluxe Edition Bonus Tracks
No.	Title	Writer(s)	Producer	Length
13.	"Guzzle, Guzzle"	Alvarez, Boice, Busek, Decker, Ragan	Boice	3:39
14.	"I'll Be There"	Boice, Murillo, Ragan, Terrell	Boice, Terrell	4:01
15.	"Let Go"	Busek, Decker, Gould, Murillo, Ragan	Gould	4:16
Total length:				58:09

iTunes Bonus Track
No.	Title	Writer(s)	Producer	Length
16.	"Ghost"	Boice, Ragan, Terrell	Boice, Ragan, Terrell	3:21
Total length:				61:30

Best Buy Bonus Tracks
No.	Title	Writer(s)	Producer	Length
16.	"Sing"	Murillo, Ragan, Terrell	Terrell	4:05
17.	"Fuck the World"	Decker, Murillo, Ragan	Decker	4:09
Total length:				66:26

== Personnel ==
Credits adapted from AllMusic.

Hollywood Undead

- Jorel "J-Dog" Decker – vocals, rhythm guitar, bass, keyboards, synth, programming, production
- Matthew "Da Kurlzz" Busek – vocals on "Gravity", drums, percussion, backing vocals
- Dylan "Funny Man" Alvarez – vocals, soundboards
- George "Johnny 3 Tears" Ragan – vocals, bass
- Jordon "Charlie Scene" Terrell – vocals, lead guitar, production
- Daniel "Danny" Murillo – vocals, keyboards, rhythm guitar, bass

Production

- Griffin Boice – production
- Sean Gould – production
- Ted Jensen – mastering, at Sterling Sound, NYC

== Charts ==
=== Weekly charts ===
Chart (2015)	Peak position
US Billboard 200	18
US Top Alternative Albums (Billboard)	4
US Top Rock Albums (Billboard)	4
US Top Hard Rock Albums (Billboard)	2

=== Year-end charts ===
Chart (2015)	Position
US Top Rock Albums (Billboard)	66
