= New Empire, Vol. 2 =

Studio album by Hollywood Undead
- Released: December 4, 2020
- Genre: Rock; hip hop; rap rock
- Length: 31:50
- Label: Dove & Grenade Media; BMG
- Producer: Matt Good; Jordon "Charlie Scene" Terrell

Hollywood Undead studio album chronology
New Empire, Vol. 1 (2020)	New Empire, Vol. 2 (2020)	Hotel Kalifornia (2022)

Singles from New Empire, Vol. 2
- 1. "Idol" Released: July 31, 2020; 2. "Coming Home" Released: September 18, 2020; 3. "Heart of a Champion" Released: October 16, 2020; 4. "Gonna Be OK" Released: November 13, 2020

New Empire, Vol. 2 is the seventh studio album by American rap rock band Hollywood Undead. It was released on December 4, 2020 through Dove & Grenade Media and BMG and was produced by Matt Good. The album is the follow-up to the group's sixth album, New Empire, Vol. 1 (2020).

== Background and promotion ==
On July 31, the band released the first single titled "Idol" featuring Tech N9ne from the unannounced official follow-up to New Empire, Vol. 1. On September 18, the band released the second single "Coming Home".

On October 16, 2020, the band released the third single and remix version of the song "Heart of a Champion" featuring Jacoby Shaddix of Papa Roach and Spencer Charnas of Ice Nine Kills along with an accompanying music video. At the same time, the band announced the album itself, the album cover, the track list, and release date. On November 13, three weeks before the album release, the band released the fourth and final single of the album "Gonna Be OK".

A Red-and-Yellow Color Vinyl version of the album is available at Tower Records website.

== Critical reception ==
Professional ratings
Review scores
Source	Rating
Classic Rock	3/5 stars
Dead Press!	7/10
Distorted Sound	5/10
Kerrang!	3/5 stars
Rock Sins	7/10
Sputnikmusic	3/5 stars

The album received mostly positive reviews, but also mixed reviews from several critics. Carlos Zelaya from Dead Press! rated the album positively calling it: "With New Empire, Vol. 2, Hollywood Undead won't exactly convert a new audience, but they will satisfy their existing fanbase. Continuing to grow their sound and embrace the hip-hop styles that they've invariably influenced, Hollywood Undead close out the year with an ambitious and revitalised approach to their sound." Distorted Sound scored the album 5 out of 10 and said: "It was honestly surprising to hear a mostly lifeless album emerge from a group as full of piss and vinegar as HOLLYWOOD UNDEAD is. Credit is due to the band for attempting to get involved with the times and recognising what is popular now, but the execution leaves much to be desired. It's time to regroup and re-plan the strategy for the next record. They're sniffing out the right track, but they have some thinking to do when the artists they want to join go much harder lyrically and musically than they do."

Writing for Kerrang!, Jake Richardson gave the album an overall positive review, saying: "If you've never liked this band, then there's little here that's likely to convert you, but for those already on board, New Empire, Vol. 2 is a more than satisfying confirmation that, a decade-and-a-half after they started, Hollywood Undead still have something to offer." James Holder of Rock Sins rated the album 7 out of 10 and said: "New Empire, Vol. 2 is Hollywood Undead just as they've always been, and that's just the way they like it."

== Track listing ==
New Empire, Vol. 2 track listing
No.	Title	Length
1.	"Medicate"	3:09
2.	"Comin' Thru the Stereo" (featuring Hyro the Hero)	3:26
3.	"Ghost Out"	2:43
4.	"Gonna Be OK"	2:54
5.	"Monsters" (featuring Killstation)	3:03
6.	"Idol" (featuring Tech N9ne)	4:07
7.	"Coming Home"	3:13
8.	"Unholy"	2:39
9.	"Worth It"	3:01
10.	"Heart of a Champion" (remix; featuring Jacoby Shaddix of Papa Roach and Spencer Charnas of Ice Nine Kills)	3:30
Total length:		31:50

bonus tracks
No.	Title	Length
11.	"Idol" (featuring Ghostkid)	4:07
12.	"Idol" (featuring Kurt92)	4:07
Total length:		40:04

== Personnel ==
Credits adapted from AllMusic.

Hollywood Undead

- Jorel "J-Dog" Decker – vocals, guitars, bass, keyboards, programming, composition
- Dylan "Funny Man" Alvarez – vocals, composition
- George "Johnny 3 Tears" Ragan – vocals, bass, composition
- Jordon "Charlie Scene" Terrell – vocals, guitars, composition, production
- Daniel "Danny" Murillo – vocals, keyboards, programming, guitars, bass, composition

Additional musicians

- Hyro the Hero – guest vocals on track 2, composition
- Killstation – guest vocals on track 5
- Tech N9ne – guest vocals on track 6, composition
- Jacoby Shaddix of Papa Roach – guest vocals on track 10
- Spencer Charnas of Ice Nine Kills – guest vocals on track 10
- Ghostkid – guest vocals on track 11
- Kurt92 – guest vocals on track 12
- Luke Holland – drums

Additional personnel

- Matt Good – production, engineering, mastering, mixing, composition
- Ted Jensen – engineering
- Ian Dietrich, Chris Nilsson and Andrew Purcell – management
- Darren Craig – art direction
- Randall Leddy – layout
