= Day of the Dead (song) =

Single by Hollywood Undead

from the album Day of the Dead
- Released: October 21, 2014
- Recorded: 2014
- Genre: Nu metal; rap metal
- Length: 3:52
- Label: Interscope
- Songwriters: Dylan Alvarez; Matthew Busek; Jorel Decker; Sean R Gould; Daniel Murillo; George Ragan; Jordon Terrell
- Producer: Sean Gould

Hollywood Undead singles chronology
"Another Way Out" (2013)	"Day of the Dead" (2014)	"Usual Suspects" (2015)

Music video
- "Day of the Dead" on YouTube

"Day of the Dead" is a song by American rap rock band Hollywood Undead. It is the first official single from the band's fourth studio album of the same name. The song was leaked on their Vevo YouTube channel on October 17, and was shortly removed afterwards. It was officially released as the first single on October 21, 2014. The album was released on March 31, 2015. The music video was released onto their Vevo YouTube channel on March 17, 2015

== Personnel ==
Hollywood Undead

- Daniel "Danny" Murillo – clean vocals, keyboards, rhythm guitar
- Jordon "Charlie Scene" Terrel – vocals, lead guitar, clean vocals
- Jorel "J-Dog" Decker – vocals, unclean vocals, bass guitar, keyboards, synth, programming
- George "Johnny 3 Tears" Ragan – vocals, bass guitar
- Matthew "Da Kurlzz" Busek – unclean vocals, background vocals, drums, percussion

== Charts ==
Chart (2014)	Peak position
US Rock Songs (Billboard)	17
US Rock Digital Songs (Billboard)	6

== Certifications ==
Region	Certification	Certified units/sales
United States (RIAA)	Gold	500,000^{‡}
^{‡} Sales+streaming figures based on certification alone.
