= The Minaret =

The Minaret (64°46′S 63°39′W) is a steep rock pinnacle, 1,065 metres (3,500 ft) high, on the ridge extending northeast from Mount William in the southern part of Anvers Island, in the Palmer Archipelago, Antarctica. It was surveyed by the Falkland Islands Dependencies Survey in 1944 and again in 1955. The name, given by the UK Antarctic Place-Names Committee, is descriptive of the shape of the summit, suggesting a minaret.
