= Jeris Johnson =

American singer-songwriter

- Born: April 5, 1996 (age 30); Eugene, Oregon
- Other name: Jeris
- Occupations: singer; songwriter
- Years active: 2015–present
- Musical career
- Genres: Metal; rock
- Instruments: Vocals; drums
- Labels: 300 Entertainment; SCRAPPY Records

Jeris Johnson (born April 5, 1996) is an American singer-songwriter from Eugene, Oregon known for blending pop, rock, metal, and alternative music. He gained recognition through social media and collaborations with various artists.

== Career ==
Johnson's first instrument was the drums, which he began playing at a young age. As a teen metal fan, he grew the inspiration of giving metal music a new aspect through the use of technology. He started making music since his early teens. In 2015, began uploading songs under the name "Jeris." In 2020, he deleted his earlier work and started releasing music under his full name.

Johnson has discussed the role of the internet in shaping his music and his interest in adapting rock and metal for a younger audience. He has stated that while he appreciates classic rock, he aims to modernize the genre by integrating digital production techniques. He has also spoken about the use of artificial intelligence and technology in music creation, suggesting that anyone can enhance their creativity. He argues that technology can be used in a "human way" and become more creative, pointing out that several metal genres have become well-known as a result of their use of technology.

Johnson draws inspiration from a number of different things, some of them include the videos games The Elder Scrolls V: Skyrim and God of War Ragnarök, the Viking Age, the series Game of Thrones and artists Amon Amarth, Avenged Sevenfold, Lamb of God, Papa Roach.

In 2021, he released a remix of Papa Roach's song "Last Resort", named "Last Resort Reloaded" after teasing it to the TikTok platform. Johnson's remix of "Last Resort" received widespread attention on the app, leading to an official release. He has described "Last Resort" as one of the songs that made him pursue music in that genre. That same year, he remixed Bring Me the Horizon's Can You Feel My Heart. After uploading a part of the remix on his TikTok account, the band's frontman, Oli Sykes, contacted him and discussed to officially release it as a remix. Johnson also opened for Korn and Evanescence on tour. Although "Last Resort Reloaded" is sometimes considered his breakthrough release, Johnson had gained attention earlier when Nickelback's Chad Kroeger remixed his song "damn!". Later, he released his first EP, "My Sword".

In 2022, inspired by Slayer's Raining Blood, he incorporated the main guitar riff of the song and added it to a new track of the same name featuring rapper ZillaKami in order to create controversy amongst other fans of the song.

In 2023, he collaborated with English rock band Yonaka on the track "Detonate" for G2 Esports, a collaboration that fulfilled his dream of creating music for a game. He also released his first metal track, "When The Darkness Comes", which was praised by metal fans and was noted for its similarities to the style of American band Avenged Sevenfold.

In 2024, he released his second album named "Dragonborn". He also participated in the writing process of "All My Life", a song by Falling in Reverse featuring Jelly Roll. That year, he was one of the opening acts for Kim Dracula and later joined Falling in Reverse on tour.

== Discography ==
=== Studio albums ===
Title	Album details
I Want Blood/ I Want Love	Released: February 4, 2022; Label: 300 Entertainment; Formats: CD, DL
Dragonborn	Released: August 23, 2024; Labels: SCRAPPY Records; Formats: CD, DL, LP

=== Extended plays ===
Title	Album details
My Sword	Released: January 29, 2021; Label: 300 Entertainment; Formats: DL

=== Singles ===
==== As a lead artist ====
Title	Year	Peak chart positions		Certifications	Album
Title	Year	US Hard Rock	US Main. Rock	Certifications	Album
"Sticks + Stones"	2020	—	—		Non-album singles
"Damn!"	2020	—	—		Non-album singles
"Damn! [Remix]"(with Ricky Desktop and Chad Kroeger)	2020	—	—	RIAA: Gold	Non-album singles
"Last Resort (Reloaded)"(with Papa Roach)	2021	1	—	RIAA: Gold	Non-album singles
"Can You Feel My Heart (Remix) (with Bring Me the Horizon)	2021	—	—		Non-album singles
"One Night"	2021	—	—		Non-album singles
"Friday (Reloaded)"	2022	—	—		Non-album singles
"Raining Blood"(featuring ZillaKami)	2022	—	—		Non-album singles
"Levitate (The Summer Song)"	2022	—	—		Non-album singles
"A Summertime Side Quest"	2022	—	—		Non-album singles
"Kryptonite (reloaded)"	2023	—	—		Non-album singles
"Detonate"(with Yonaka)	2023	—	—		Non-album singles
"Avoid Me 3 (Jeris Johnson remix)"(with KUTE)	2023	—	—		Non-album singles
"Take Me Away"	2023	—	—		Non-album singles
"When The Darkness Comes"	2023	8	30		Dragonborn
"Ode to Metal"	2023	—	—		Dragonborn
"Battling My Demons"(with BOI WHAT)	2024	—	—		Non-album single
"John"	2024	—	50		Dragonborn
"Here's To The Years"	2024	—	—		Dragonborn
"Kiss From A Rose" (Seal cover)	2024	—	—		Dragonborn
"Power"	2025	—	39		Non-album single

==== As a featured artist ====
Title	Artist	Year	Album
"Dark Days"	Point North	2022	Prepare for Death
"All My Friends"	Hollywood Undead	2026	non-album single
"Are You Entertained?"	Sueco	2026	Party's Over
