= New Empire, Vol. 1 =

Studio album by Hollywood Undead
- Released: February 14, 2020
- Genres: Metalcore; nu metal; hard rock; post-hardcore
- Length: 32:09
- Labels: Dove & Grenade Media; BMG
- Producer: Matt Good

Hollywood Undead studio album chronology
Five (2017)	New Empire, Vol. 1 (2020)	New Empire, Vol. 2 (2020)

Singles from New Empire, Vol. 1
- 1. "Already Dead" Released: October 25, 2019; 2. "Time Bomb" Released: November 15, 2019; 3. "Empire" Released: January 10, 2020

New Empire, Vol. 1 is the sixth studio album by American rap rock band Hollywood Undead. It was released on February 14, 2020, through Dove & Grenade Media and BMG and was produced by Matt Good.

== Background and promotion ==
Hollywood Undead released the lead single "Already Dead" on October 25, 2019. A music video was released about a week later on October 31, 2019. The second single, "Time Bomb" was released on November 15, as well as the announcement that the album would be titled New Empire, Vol. 1.

According to member George "Johnny 3 Tears" Ragan: "This album is our attempt at reimagining Hollywood Undead, not just a new sound for this release, but a new sound for the band altogether. Our goal from the outset was to make music that stands alone from our other albums, yet seamlessly fits with what we've made before. Building upon the old to create a new sound and a New Empire."

In an interview with Silverstein vocalist Shane Told on his Lead Singer Syndrome podcast show, members Danny Murillo and Jorel "J-Dog" Decker confirmed that Benji Madden of Good Charlotte, Kellin Quinn of Sleeping with Sirens, and rapper Killstation will be featuring on New Empire, Vol. 1. On January 10, 2020, one month before the album the release, the band released the third and final single of the album "Empire" and its corresponding music video.

== Critical reception ==
Professional ratings
Review scores
Source	Rating
AllMusic	3.5/5 stars
Distorted Sound	6/10
Kerrang!	3/5 stars
Upset	3/5 stars
Wall of Sound	7/10

The album received positive reviews from critics. AllMusic gave the album a positive review saying, "That vitality is omnipresent throughout the album's brutally efficient 32-minute runtime; a tightly packed sonic assault festooned with djent-y breakdowns, bold electronics, seedy West Coast rap verses, and huge radio-ready choruses. It's not the boldest line of demarcation between the group's past and present -- it's far too soon to be rebranding themselves as Hollywood Reborn -- but New Empire is aptly named, and more importantly, a pretty damn solid record." Writing for Kerrang!, Tom Shepherd gave the album an overall positive review, giving particular praise to the song "Empire" and the features on the album. Tamara May of Wall of Sound stated positive opinions about the album, saying the following: "While Hollywood Undead aren't necessarily breaking new ground here, New Empire, Volume I is a solid collection of new tracks for fans to fall in love with. The top production courtesy of Matt Good needs to be commended here as well as the band's attempt at reimagining their sound was a decent effort. I'd definitely recommend adding this into your post-hardcore listening session next time." May also praised the songs "Empire", "Enemy" and "Already Dead", particularly commending the production on the songs.

== Track listing ==
New Empire, Vol. 1 track listing
No.	Title	Length
1.	"Time Bomb"	3:37
2.	"Heart of a Champion"	3:30
3.	"Already Dead"	3:56
4.	"Empire"	3:59
5.	"Killin' It"	2:55
6.	"Enemy"	3:11
7.	"Upside Down" (featuring Kellin Quinn of Sleeping with Sirens)	3:04
8.	"Second Chances" (featuring Benji Madden of Good Charlotte)	4:13
9.	"Nightmare"	3:40
Total length:		32:09

== Personnel ==
Credits adapted from AllMusic.

Hollywood Undead

- Jorel "J-Dog" Decker – vocals, guitars, bass, keyboards, programming
- Dylan "Funny Man" Alvarez – vocals
- George "Johnny 3 Tears" Ragan – vocals, bass
- Jordon "Charlie Scene" Terrell – vocals, guitars
- Daniel "Danny" Murillo – vocals, keyboards, programming, guitars, bass

Additional musicians

- Kellin Quinn of Sleeping with Sirens – guest vocals on track 7
- Benji Madden of Good Charlotte – guest vocals on track 8
- Joey Sturgis – guitar on track 8
- Luke Holland – drums on tracks 1–4, 6–8

Additional personnel

- Matt Good – production, mastering, mixing, composition
- Ian Dietrich, Chris Nilsson and Andrew Purcell – management
- Darren Craig – art direction
- Randall Leddy – layout

== Charts ==
Chart performance for New Empire, Vol. 1
Chart (2020)	Peak position
Czech Albums (ČNS IFPI)	67
German Albums (Offizielle Top 100)	30
Hungarian Albums (MAHASZ)	27
Scottish Albums (Official Charts)	24
Swiss Albums (Schweizer Hitparade)	43
UK Albums (Official Charts)	54
US Billboard 200	125
US Top Rock Albums (Billboard)	14

== See also ==
- List of 2020 albums
