= Been to Hell =

Single by Hollywood Undead

from the album American Tragedy
- Released: February 5, 2011 (free download); March 15, 2011 (single)
- Recorded: November 2010
- Genre: Rap metal; nu metal
- Length: 3:23 (album edit)
- Label: A&M Octone
- Songwriters: Dylan Alvarez; Matthew Busek; Jorel Decker; Don Gilmore; Daniel Murillo; George Ragan; Jordon Terrell
- Producer: Don Gilmore (also exec.)

Hollywood Undead singles chronology
"Hear Me Now" (2010)	"Been to Hell" (2011)	"Coming Back Down" (2011)

Music video
- "Been to Hell" on YouTube

"Been to Hell" is a song by American rap rock band Hollywood Undead. It is the second single from their second full-length album, American Tragedy, and the first track on that album. It is the band's eighth overall single in their discography. The track was released as a free download on the band's official website on February 5, 2011. It was later released as a single on March 15 and accompanied an official music video the same day. A remix was featured on the band's American Tragedy Redux remix album.

== Background ==
The band had been recording for a second album since early 2010, also in the midst of The United States 2010 Recession. This caused an eventual peak of 14% unemployment in the band's state of California. The recession caused a partial motivation for "Been to Hell"'s lyrics of failure and the darker tone. The song is specifically about people who come to Hollywood expecting to achieve greatness and fame, but are unable to accomplish this for reasons of drugs, temptation, and apathy. When speaking about the track's message, J-Dog says it's about "The truth about what really happens to people when they move to LA, to be actors or models or god knows what other delusions people have... failure. It's all too true, but most people aren't there to see it first hand... But we are, so it's our interpretation of it all. And make sure you stick around til the end..."

The first surfacing of the track was on January 11, 2011, when the band officially announced the title of their second album, American Tragedy, and released a short one-minute preview video of the album. The video included an instrumental of "Been to Hell", which was untitled at the time. The track was the third song released following the first single, "Hear Me Now", and the promotional single, "Comin' in Hot". The full song was released on the band's official website at midnight on February 5 as a free download to add fans to their mailing list and to promote the album. In addition, an official lyric video was released that showed flashes of Los Angeles and the band's new masks, an elaboration of the album's preview video. The track was removed as a free download a few weeks later before it was released as a single and put on iTunes on March 15, 2011. The music video was co-directed by Jeff Janke and Corey Soria, with a cameo by porn star Peter North.

A remix of the song by KMFDM titled "Been to Hell... and Back!" was included on the 2011 remix album American Tragedy Redux.

== Music video ==
The band performing in the "Been to Hell" music video. From left to right: J-Dog, Johnny 3 Tears, Da Kurlzz, Charlie Scene, Danny, Daren Pfeifer (touring member), Funny Man

On March 15, an official music video was released on iTunes, but was available for free to people who pre-ordered the album from iTunes. The video was posted on the band's official website three days later on March 18 for viewing. Differing from the official lyrics video for the song, the music video shows clips of Los Angeles and the band performing. The band is shown playing in an underground garage with two podiums holding a drum kit on one and some percussion instruments and a keyboard on the other. Da Kurlzz plays the percussion and keyboards while the band's touring member, Daren Pfeifer, plays the drums in the video without any mask. J-Dog raps the first verse, Johnny 3 Tears raps the second, and Charlie Scene raps the third. The choruses are sung by Danny with Charlie Scene doing background vocals. When the band is performing, a few shots of the member performing has every other member in the background shown to be frozen in motion, even if there is a part for their instrument at the time.

== Reception ==
The single debuted at number thirteen on the Billboard Heatseekers Songs chart and number 2 on the Bubbling Under Hot 100.

== Charts ==
Chart (2011)	Peak position
US Heatseeker Songs (Billboard)	13
US Bubbling Under Hot 100 (Billboard)	2

== Accolades ==
Year	Award	Result	Place
2011	AOL Radio: Top 10 Rock Songs of 2011	Won	5th
"—" denotes a nomination that did not place or places were not relevant in the award.

== Personnel ==
Hollywood Undead

- J-Dog – vocals, bass
- Charlie Scene – lead guitar, rapping
- Da Kurlzz – unclean vocals
- Danny – vocals
- Funny Man – gang vocals
- Johnny 3 Tears – vocals

Additional

- Dean Butterworth – drums
- Ben Grosse – mixing
- Bart Hendrickson – programming
- BC Smith – keyboards, programming
