= Hear Me Now (Hollywood Undead song) =

Single by Hollywood Undead

from the album American Tragedy
- Released: December 13, 2010 (radio); December 21, 2010 (digital download)
- Recorded: November 2010
- Genre: Rap rock; alternative rock; electronic rock
- Length: 3:33 (album edit)
- Label: A&M Octone
- Songwriters: Dylan Alvarez; Matthew Busek; Jorel Decker; Sam Hollander; Dave Katz; Daniel Murillo; George Ragan; Jordon Terrell
- Producers: Sam Hollander; Dave Katz

Hollywood Undead singles chronology
"Black Dahlia" (2010)	"Hear Me Now" (2010)	"Been to Hell" (2011)

Music video
- "Hear Me Now" on YouTube

"Hear Me Now" is a song by American rap rock band Hollywood Undead. It is the first single from their second full-length album, American Tragedy, and the sixth track on that album. It is the band's sixth overall single in their discography. It is also the first media released by the band without vocalist/producer Deuce. The track was released to radio on December 13, 2010, with a digital download following a week later on December 21. The official music video was released on February 25, 2011. A remix was featured on the band's American Tragedy Redux remix album. This was also used as the theme song for WWE's Raw 1000 on July 23, 2012.

== Background ==
The band had been recording for a second album since early 2010. On December 8, the band announced a new single would be coming soon. On the same day, the title, single cover, and release date were announced. The cover for the single shows the inside of Da Kurlzz's new mask, hinting at new masks for the whole band for the new album and tour. The single was released a few days later to radio on December 13 while it was released for download on December 21. On March 22, the band performed the song live on Lopez Tonight to promote the album.

A remix of the song by Jonathan Davis of KoЯn was included on the 2011 remix album American Tragedy Redux.

== Music video ==
On February 25, 2011, the band released several teaser videos for the song's music video, most of them featuring Andy Milonakis. They also released the actual video on their MySpace page. The video was directed by Jonas Åkerlund. Using the frame of a film-within-a-film, the music video showed the band members being taped while performing and delivering their verses. J-Dog performs the first verse and Johnny 3 Tears performs the second, while Danny performs the choruses and the bridge. The video featured the band performing the song while riding in the back of a truck that contains neon lights, large speakers, and stripper poles. The band is surrounded by women dancing during the video while comic-book like graphics pop up to introduce each band member. This is the first music video to feature new member Danny following the departure of Deuce.

== Reception ==
=== Critical ===
The track was released on December 13 for radio and made available online on December 21. J-Dog says that this is his favorite song that the band has done so far. The song's lyrics tell the story of a person who is depressed and hopeless, taking a very somber tone to the track. Despite this, the instruments and melodies contrast to make a "Great rock smash", reports AOL Radio Blog.

=== Commercial ===
The single reached number one on the Bubbling Under Hot 100 singles chart on Billboard. "Hear Me Now" also peaked at number nine on Billboard's Heatseekers Songs chart, number twenty-four on the Rock Songs chart, and number twenty on the Alternative Songs chart.

== Charts ==
Chart (2010–2011)	Peak position
US Alternative Songs (Billboard)	20
US Rock Songs (Billboard)	23
US Heatseeker Songs (Billboard)	9

== Track listing ==
All tracks are written by Danny, J-Dog and Johnny 3 Tears.

No.	Title	Length
1.	"Hear Me Now" (album version)	3:33
2.	"Hear Me Now" (instrumental version)	3:33

== Personnel ==
Hollywood Undead

- Charlie Scene – background vocals
- Danny – clean vocals
- J-Dog – vocals
- Johnny 3 Tears – vocals

Additional

- Sean Gould – bass guitar, drums, guitars, programming
- Sam Hollander – programming
- Dave Katz – guitars, programming

== Certifications ==
Region	Certification	Certified units/sales
United States (RIAA)	Gold	500,000^{‡}
^{‡} Sales+streaming figures based on certification alone.
