= Hollywood Undead =

American rap rock band

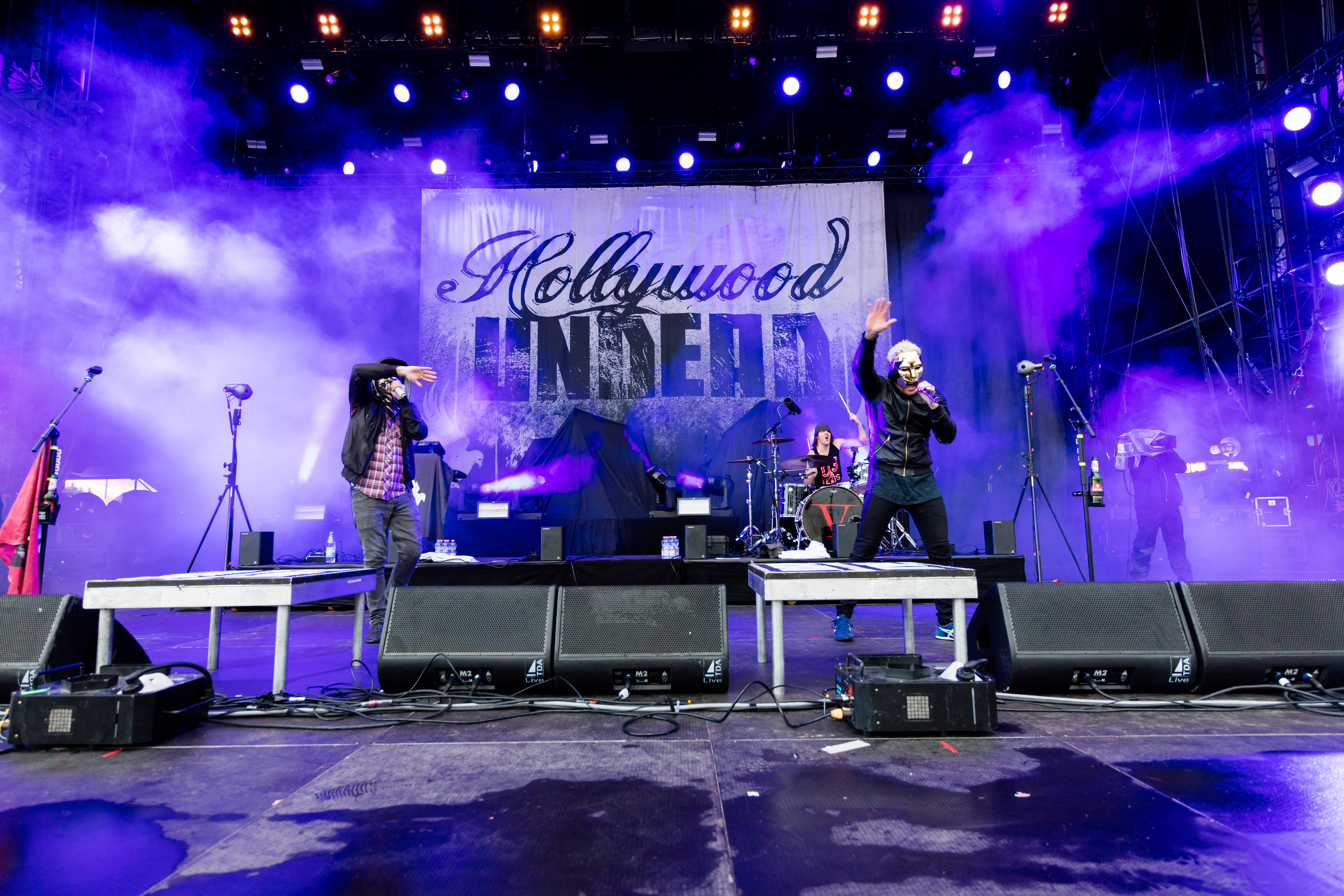
- Hollywood Undead in 2018

Background information
- Origin: Los Angeles, California, U.S.
- Genres: Rap rock; nu metal; rap metal
- Years active: 2005–present
- Labels: MDDN; Interscope; A&M/Octone; Polydor; BMG; Sumerian
- Members: J-Dog; Funny Man; Johnny 3 Tears; Charlie Scene; Danny
- Past members: Shady Jeff; Deuce; Da Kurlzz
- Website: hollywoodundead.com

Hollywood Undead is an American rap rock band from Los Angeles, California, formed in 2005. All of the band members use pseudonyms and previously wore their own unique mask, most of which were based on the common hockey goaltender design. The band currently consists of five members: J-Dog, Funny Man, Johnny 3 Tears, Charlie Scene, and Danny. They released their debut album, Swan Songs, on September 2, 2008, and their live CD/DVD Desperate Measures, on November 10, 2009. Their second studio album, American Tragedy, was released April 5, 2011. Their third studio album, titled Notes from the Underground, was released on January 8, 2013.

Their fourth studio album, Day of the Dead, was released on March 31, 2015. Hollywood Undead's fifth record is titled Five (or V), and was released on October 27, 2017. The first single from the album, called "California Dreaming", was made available July 24, 2017. Their sixth studio album, New Empire, Vol. 1, was released on February 14, 2020. Its follow-up, New Empire, Vol. 2, was released on December 4, 2020. Their most recent album, Hotel Kalifornia, was released on August 12, 2022.

== History ==
=== Formation and Swan Songs (2005–2009) ===
The band originated on June 3, 2005, as The Kids from a song titled "Hollywood" (later released as "The Kids") that Jorel Decker (J-Dog), Aron Erlichman (Deuce), and Jeff Phillips (Shady Jeff) posted on the band's MySpace profile to positive reviews, leading them to form the group Hollywood Undead with their friends George "Johnny 3 Tears" Ragan (formerly known as "The Server"), Jordon "Charlie Scene" Terrell, Dylan "Funny Man" Alvarez, and Matthew "Da Kurlzz" Busek. In an interview with Shave magazine, J-Dog explained that when forming the band "Whoever was in the room at the time and played an instrument was in the band." Phillips later left the group because of conflict with Erlichman.

The band only took one year working on their debut album, Swan Songs. The other two years were spent looking for a company that wouldn't try to censor the album. They first signed a record contract with Interscope Records in 2005 but they left the label after the label tried to censor their first album. They then signed a contract with A&M/Octone Records and their first album, Swan Songs was released on September 2, 2008, and reached No. 22 on the Billboard 200 in its first week of release, selling 21,000 copies; which was later on released in the United Kingdom on May 18, 2009, with two bonus tracks. In April 2009, the band toured with American electronic musician Skrillex as "Sonny and the Blood Monkeys". On June 23, 2009, Hollywood Undead released Swan Songs B-Sides through iTunes.

The band released a CD/DVD set entitled Desperate Measures on November 10, 2009. The set includes a CD of previously unreleased six new songs, three of which are cover songs, as well a previously unreleased remix of "Everywhere I Go", and six live recordings of songs from Swan Songs, and a DVD of a full live performance by the band. In December 2009, the band won Best Crunk/Rock Rap Artist at the Rock on Request Awards. In its first week of release, Desperate Measures reached No. 29 on the Billboard 200. It also peaked at No. 10 on the Billboard's Rock Albums chart, No. 8 on the Alternative Albums chart, No. 5 on the Hard Rock albums chart, and No. 15 on the Digital Albums chart.

=== Departure of Deuce and American Tragedy (2010–2011) ===
In early 2010, the band announced that Deuce had left the band due to creative differences. Ragan and Busek later cited arguments over writing credits, and Deuce not wanting to tour, as reasons for the departure. Decker and Terrell also stated that Deuce wanting to bring his own personal assistant for touring caused a rift between members. The band asked long-time friend, and lead singer of Lorene Drive, Daniel Murillo, to fill in for Deuce's role. Murillo had just advanced past the auditions for season 9 of American Idol, but decided to drop out to join the band.

The band soon began writing material for their second studio album, American Tragedy, in mid-2010, with hopes to release it by the end of the year. The band co-headlined the Nightmare After Christmas Tour with Avenged Sevenfold and Stone Sour to support the album. The first single, "Hear Me Now", released in December 2010. The single reached a peak of number nine on the Heatseekers Songs chart on Billboard, twenty-four on the Billboard's Rock Songs chart, and number twenty on the Alternative Songs chart. On January 21, they released a new song, "Comin' in Hot" available for a free download, and announced that the official release date for the album would be March 8, 2011. but as of February 22, 2011, it was announced that the album has been pushed back to April 5, 2011. On February 6, 2011, the band released another song titled "Been to Hell", for a free download.

American Tragedy turned out to be more successful than their first album Swan Songs, selling 66,915 in its debut week and peaking at No. 4 on the Billboard 200. It has also peaked at No. 2 on many other charts, while also reaching No. 1 on the Billboard's Top Hard Rock Albums chart. The album was also very successful in other countries, making No. 5 in Canada and No. 43 in the United Kingdom. To continue promoting the album, the band headlined the Revolt Tour, along with 10 Years, Drive A, and New Medicine. The tour took place between April 6 and May 27, 2011. After the tour, the band played several shows in Europe, Canada, and Australia. They then would headline the Endless Summer Tour with All That Remains and Hyro da Hero, which took place between July 18 and August 7, 2011.

The band announced in August 2011 that they would be releasing the remix album titled American Tragedy Redux, that would contain both professional and fan remixes from winners of a remix contest. of songs. It was released on November 21, 2011. In the same month, the band set out on the "World War III" tour, with Asking Alexandria, We Came As Romans, Borgore, and D.R.U.G.S. Following the tour, the band also joined Avenged Sevenfold again on the "Buried Alive" tour, with Black Veil Brides and Asking Alexandria, with dates running from November 11 to December 14.

=== Notes from the Underground (2012–2013) ===
Work on a third studio album began in late November 2011, with the band beginning to write and record demos while on the "Buried Alive" Tour, and heading to the studio to start recording after the conclusion of the tour. The band aimed to return the sound of their first album, Swan Songs, and that their record label had given them full creative control for the album. He also stated that the band hoped to feature more collaborations on the album.

Artistdirect named the band's upcoming album as one of the most anticipated albums of 2012, alongside other bands such as Linkin Park, Metallica, and Black Sabbath. The band revealed that Griffin Boice and Danny Lohner would return to produce the album. They also revealed that they will be upgrading their masks again, like they did prior to the release of their prior album.

On October 19, they released the track "Dead Bite" from the album for a free download, along with a lyric video to it and announcement for the upcoming album's first single. On October 29, the lead single "We Are" was released along with the album title, Notes from the Underground. On December 10, the band released their official music video for "We Are" on their Vevo account on YouTube. The teaser of the video prior the release of the video credit's Slipknot's Shawn "Clown" Crahan as the director the music video.

The album was released on January 13 and sold over 53,000 copies in its first week, charting at No. 2 on the Billboard 200 and No. 1 on Canada's Top Albums chart, making it the highest-charting album by the band.

=== Day of the Dead (2014–2016) ===
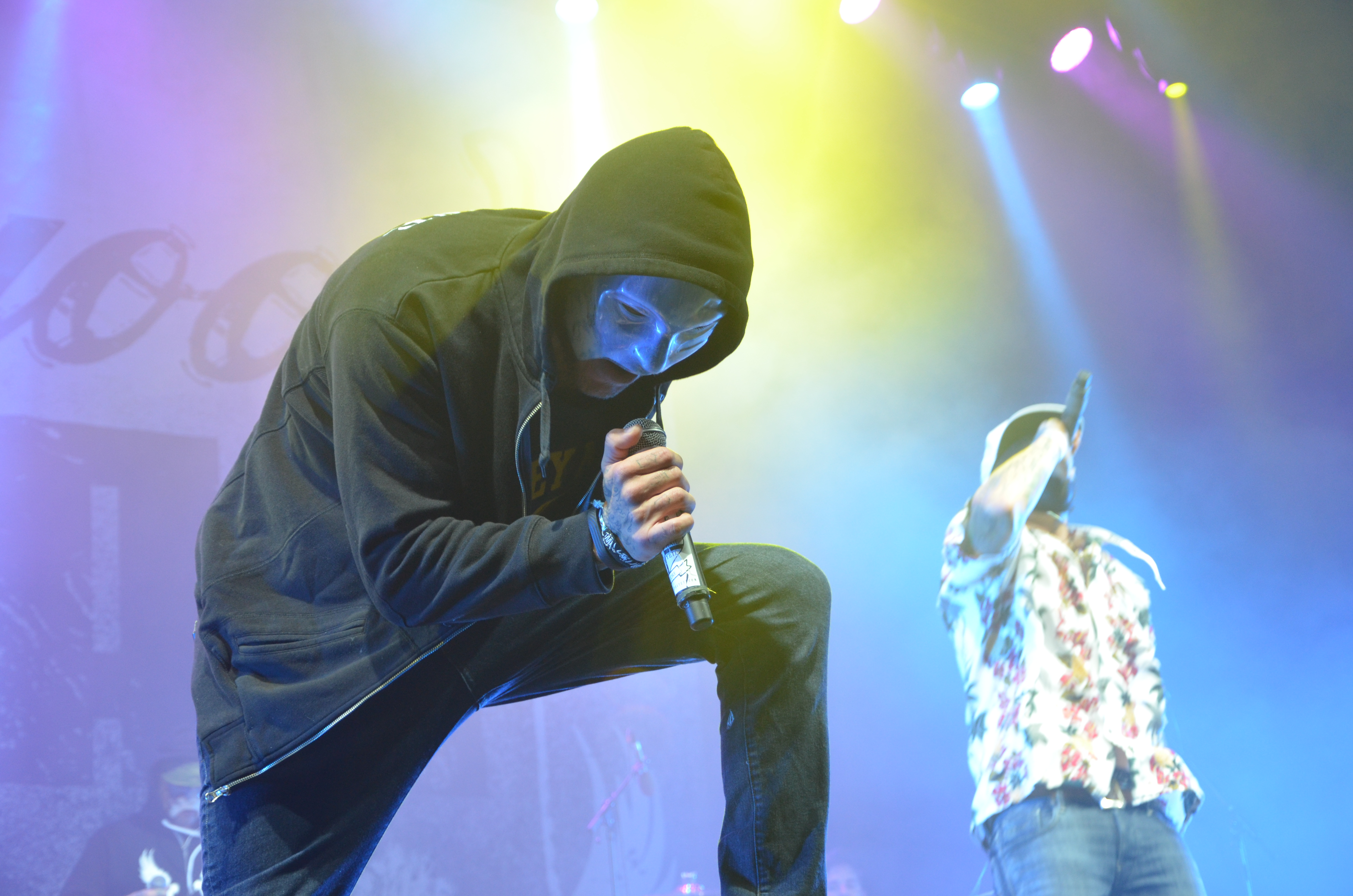
Hollywood Undead performing at Rock am Ring in 2015

On April 12, 2014, Johnny 3 Tears posted a photo on his Instagram revealing plans for the band to release a new album in the summer. On October 17, Hollywood Undead's Vevo channel leaked the audio video with a song from their new album titled "Day of the Dead," although it was removed shortly afterwards. The song was later made available on iTunes on October 21, 2014. and officially premiered through Revolver Magazine. It was also revealed that the album will also be titled Day of the Dead.

The second single, titled "Usual Suspects", was released on February 17, 2015. The next single, titled "Gravity," was released on February 24, 2015. The album was released on March 31, 2015.

On November 3, 2015, Johnny 3 Tears announced during an interview with Louder Noise that the band planned to release an EP of previously unreleased songs for free in the holiday season. However, this has yet to happen and the EP has not been mentioned since.

=== Five and Psalms (2017–2018) ===
On July 19, 2017, the song titled "California Dreaming" was leaked. The track was released officially on July 24, as the lead single off their upcoming album Five (stylized as V). On August 25, "Whatever It Takes" was uploaded to the band's official YouTube channel followed by the song "Renegade" on September 29. On October 10, founding member Da Kurlzz "amicably" parted ways with the group to "pursue his own interests". The fourth single, "We Own the Night" was released on October 13. A new video for the song "Black Cadillac" featuring B-Real, was released on December 2.

In an interview with Dead Press! whilst the band were at Reading Festival 2018, J-Dog and Danny confirmed that they intend to release a "heavy" song they've recorded called "Bloody Nose". In the same interview, they also shared their plans to record and release their sixth album in early 2019.

On October 30, 2018, it was announced that Hollywood Undead would release a new EP, Psalms, on November 2, 2018, including two songs previously released in 2018, "Gotta Let Go" and "Another Level", as well as the previously announced "Bloody Nose".

=== New Empire (2019–2020) ===
Hollywood Undead released the lead single, "Already Dead", on October 25, 2019. A music video was released about a week later on October 31, 2019. The second single, "Time Bomb" was released on November 15, as well as the announcement that the album would be titled New Empire, Vol. 1. According to member George "Johnny 3 Tears" Ragan: "This album is our attempt at reimagining Hollywood Undead, not just a new sound for this release, but a new sound for the band altogether. Our goal from the outset was to make music that stands alone from our other albums, yet seamlessly fits with what we've made before. Building upon the old to create a new sound and a New Empire."

In an interview with Silverstein vocalist Shane Told on his Lead Singer Syndrome podcast show, members Danny Murillo and Jorel "J-Dog" Decker confirmed that Benji Madden of Good Charlotte, Kellin Quinn of Sleeping with Sirens, and rapper Killstation would feature on New Empire, Vol. 1. On January 10, 2020, one month before the album the release, the band released the third and final single of the album "Empire" and its corresponding music video.

On July 31, the band released the first single titled "Idol" featuring Tech N9ne from the unannounced official follow-up to New Empire, Vol. 1. On September 4, the official music video for "The End / Undead", a song by Zero 9:36 featuring Charlie Scene, Johnny 3 Tears, and Funny Man of Hollywood Undead, was released. On September 18, the band released the second single "Coming Home". On October 16, 2020, the band released the third single and remix version of the song "Heart of a Champion" featuring Jacoby Shaddix of Papa Roach and Spencer Charnas of Ice Nine Kills along with an accompanying music video. That same day, the band revealed the tracklist, album's official artwork and announced that their seventh studio album New Empire, Vol. 2 was set for release on December 4, 2020. On November 13, three weeks before the album release, the band released the fourth and final single of the album "Gonna Be OK".

=== Hotel Kalifornia (2021–2023) ===
On September 5, 2021, the band announced that they were working on new music for their upcoming eighth studio album. On February 25, 2022, a few months after the announcement, the band released the first single "Chaos". On April 20, the band unveiled second single "Wild in These Streets" and its corresponding music video. On June 8, the band released the third single "City of the Dead". At the same time, they officially announced that their eighth studio album, Hotel Kalifornia, which was released on August 12, 2022. On July 8, one month before the album release, the band unveiled the fourth single "Trap God". On March 1, 2023, the band released the fifth single "Evil" while also announcing the deluxe edition of the album which is set for release on April 28. On March 29, the band premiered the sixth single "Salvation". On April 25, the band published the seventh single "House of Mirrors" featuring Jelly Roll along with a music video.

Hollywood Undead toured with Papa Roach, Falling in Reverse and Escape the Fate at various points in 2023.

=== Upcoming ninth studio album (2024-present) ===
On October 24, 2024, the band released the single "Hollywood Forever". In March 2025, Johnny 3 Tears stated the band would not be releasing a new album and would instead shift focus to releasing singles. The band performed at the Sonic Temple music festival in Columbus, Ohio in May of 2025. On June 26, 2025, the band released the single "SAVIOR". On March 11, 2026, the band released the single "1x1". On May 1, 2026, the band released the single "All My Friends" featuring Jeris Johnson. On May 29, 2026, the band released the single "Feels Like Home".

On June 15, 2026, Johnny 3 Tears announced the band would be releasing a new album in early 2027, and that none of the standalone singles would appear on the record.

== Musical style and influences ==
Hollywood Undead's style has been observed as a revival of rap rock and nu metal, styles that had declined prior to the band's formation. Additionally, Invisible Oranges referred to them as "scene music" in a 2018 article, and Kerrang! referred to them as a "Myspace band" due to their immense popularity on Myspace early in their career. Loudwire stated that the band has also been classified under several other "all-encompassing" labels such as "myspace-core" and "scene-core," due to the band's popularity with listeners who the publication described as "the scene kids of Myspace."

The Guardian wrote of the band, "These mask-wearing rap-metallers are an industrial boy band, N-Sync meets Nine Inch Nails". The Brag wrote, "Though the rock half of the band sounds pretty pop-punk, their aesthetic and subject matter is straight horrorcore. I tried to sum up their sound to a friend by calling it 'Good Charlotte fronted by Insane Clown Posse' [...] They rap-sing about murder, suicide, the apocalypse and chloroform while wearing masks like hockey-playing killers or Mexican wrestlers." Digital Beat said that the band combined elements of "rock, industrial and rap" as well as EDM. In a 2011 interview, band member Johnny 3 Tears said that he did not consider Hollywood Undead to be a rap rock band, but rather a rock band that was influenced by hip hop. In a 2020 interview, he said that he considers Hollywood Undead to be an industrial hip hop group, describing their sound as "an amalgamation of Nine Inch Nails and the Beastie Boys".

Funny Man cites 1990s hip-hop artists such as N.W.A, Wu-Tang Clan, and Snoop Dogg as some of the band's influences, while Johnny 3 Tears cites Tom Petty, John Fogerty, John Lennon, and Paul McCartney as some of his personal influences. Other influences for the band include Dog Eat Dog, Eminem, Linkin Park, Rage Against the Machine, Downset., Incubus, Nine Inch Nails, Slipknot, and Beastie Boys.

== Band members ==
Current members

- Jorel "J-Dog" Decker – vocals, guitars, bass, keyboards, programming (2005–present)
- Dylan "Funny Man" Alvarez – vocals (2005–present); bass (2023–present)
- George "Johnny 3 Tears" Ragan – vocals (2005–present); bass (2013–present)
- Jordon "Charlie Scene" Terrell – vocals, guitars (2005–present)
- Danny Murillo – vocals (2009–present); keyboards, programming (2011–present); guitars, bass (2013–present)

Current touring musicians

- Anthony Ghazel – drums, percussion (2023–present)

Former members

- Jeffrey "Shady Jeff" Phillips – vocals, keyboards, programming (2005–2007)
- Aron "Deuce" Erlichman – vocals, bass, keyboards, programming (2005–2009)
- Matthew "Da Kurlzz" Busek – vocals, drums, percussion (2005–2017)

Former touring musicians

- Glendon "Biscuitz" Crain – drums, percussion (2008–2010)
- Daren Pfeifer – drums, percussion (2010–2014)
- Tyler Mahurin – drums, percussion (2014–2017)
- Matt "The Kat" Oloffson – drums, percussion (2017–2020)
- Greg Garman – drums, percussion (2020–2022)
- Matt Guyre – drums, percussion (2022)

Timeline

== Discography ==
- Swan Songs (2008)
- American Tragedy (2011)
- Notes from the Underground (2013)
- Day of the Dead (2015)
- Five (2017)
- New Empire, Vol. 1 (2020)
- New Empire, Vol. 2 (2020)
- Hotel Kalifornia (2022)

== Accolades ==
Year	Nominated work	Award	Result	Place
2011	"Been to Hell"	AOL Radio: Top 10 Rock Songs of 2011	Won	5th
