= A&M Octone Records =

Record label

OctoScope Music, LLC
- Parent company: Universal Music Group
- Founded: 2000; 26 years ago (as Octone Records); 2007; 19 years ago (as A&M Octone Records)
- Founder: James Diener; David Boxenbaum
- Defunct: 2014; 12 years ago
- Status: Defunct
- Distributors: Interscope Geffen A&M (United States); Polydor (United Kingdom); Universal Music Group (international)
- Genre: Various
- Country of origin: United States
- Location: New York City, New York

A&M Octone Records was an American record label owned as a joint venture between James Diener and Universal Music Group. A full-service artist development label, it was founded in 2007 as a merger between Octone and Interscope Geffen A&M's defunct A&M Records label. For its six years of existence, A&M Octone operated music publishing, merchandising, and touring entities, in addition to specializing in recorded music.

In September 2013, Octone initiated its buy/sell rights in the joint venture, resulting in Interscope Geffen A&M purchasing Octone's 50% interest in A&M Octone, with Interscope absorbing and restructuring its artist roster in 2014.

== Overview ==
=== History ===
Launched in 2000, Octone Records was founded by CEO/President James Diener and distributed through Bertelsmann Music Group (known as Sony BMG from 2004 to 2008, now Sony Music). After successful signing, release, marketing and promotion on Octone, artists were given the option of upstreaming to RCA Music Group, via a joint-venture between the two companies. Upon launch, Diener and Octone Records were also well known in the music industry for their entrepreneurial private-equity financing model.

In February 2007, Interscope-Geffen-A&M partnered with Octone Records to relaunch the A&M label, headed by James Diener and called A&M/Octone Records with worldwide distribution handled by parent Universal Music Group. The existing Octone roster was transferred to the A&M/Octone label and all new artist signings were made under the A&M/Octone joint venture.

The legal name of the A&M/Octone label was "OctoScope Music, LLC" (d.b.a. A&M/Octone Records), the name derives from the merger of the labels Octone and Interscope. OctoScope Music, LLC was the copyright holder on all A&M/Octone releases. A&M/Octone Records operated from 2007 until 2014.

=== Executive staff ===
- James Diener, CEO/president
- David Boxenbaum, general manager/chief operating officer
- Ben Berkman, EVP/head of promotion
- Rome Thomas, senior vice president sales & artist development
- Nina Webb, head of marketing
- Roi Hernandez, head of creative services & electronic A&R
- Yu-Ting Lin, vice president A&R admin & label operations

== Former recording artists ==
- Maroon 5
- K'Naan
- Flyleaf
- Hollywood Undead
- Kat Graham
- The Hives
- The Knocks
- Bombay Bicycle Club
- Hunter Hunted
- Drop City Yacht Club
- Kevin Hammond
- Duncan
- Churchill
- As Fast As
- Dropping Daylight
- Paper Tongues
- Michael Tolcher
- Miss Willie Brown
- White Light Motorcade

== See also ==
- Geffen Records
