= Johnny 3 Tears =

American musician (born 1981)

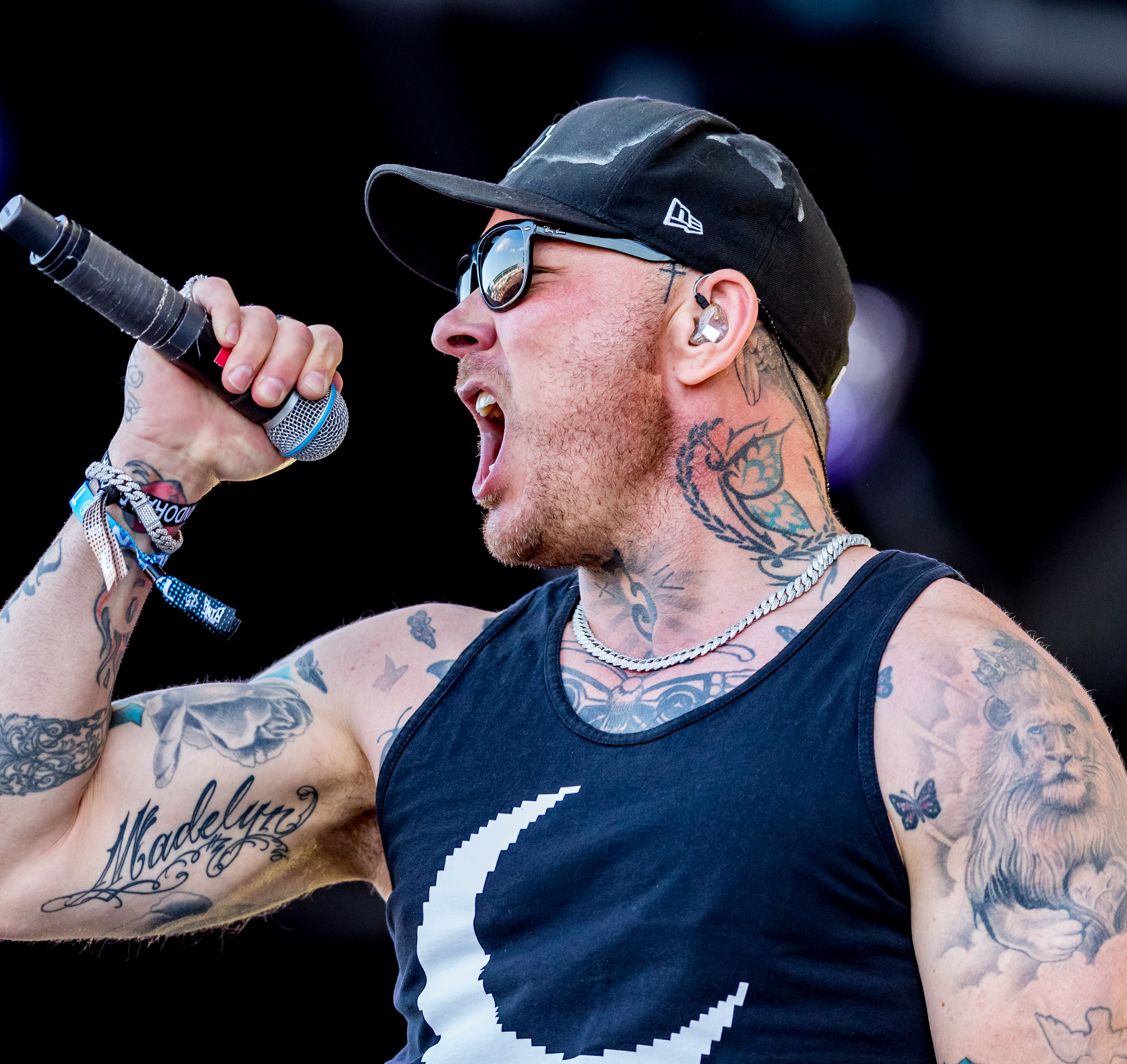
- Ragan at Rock am Ring in 2023

Background information
- Born: George Ragan; June 24, 1981 (age 45)
- Origin: Los Angeles, California
- Genres: Rap rock, nu metal, alternative metal
- Occupations: Musician, rapper, singer
- Instruments: Vocals, bass guitar
- Works: Hollywood Undead discography
- Years active: 2005–present
- Member of: Hollywood Undead

George Ragan (born on June 24, 1981), better known by his stage name Johnny 3 Tears (acronymized as J3T), is an American musician who sings and plays bass guitar for the American rap rock band Hollywood Undead.

== Early life ==
Ragan grew up in a rough neighborhood of Los Angeles that was heavily affected by street gun violence, drugs, graffiti, and gangs (particularly the 18th Street gang). In preschool and kindergarten, he was close friends with some of his future Hollywood Undead bandmates, including Charlie Scene (birth name Jordon Terrell). Ragan's parents regularly gave him books for Christmas to aid his education. At the age of 17, Ragan graduated from high school while at juvenile hall for firearm possession.

== Career ==
=== With Hollywood Undead ===
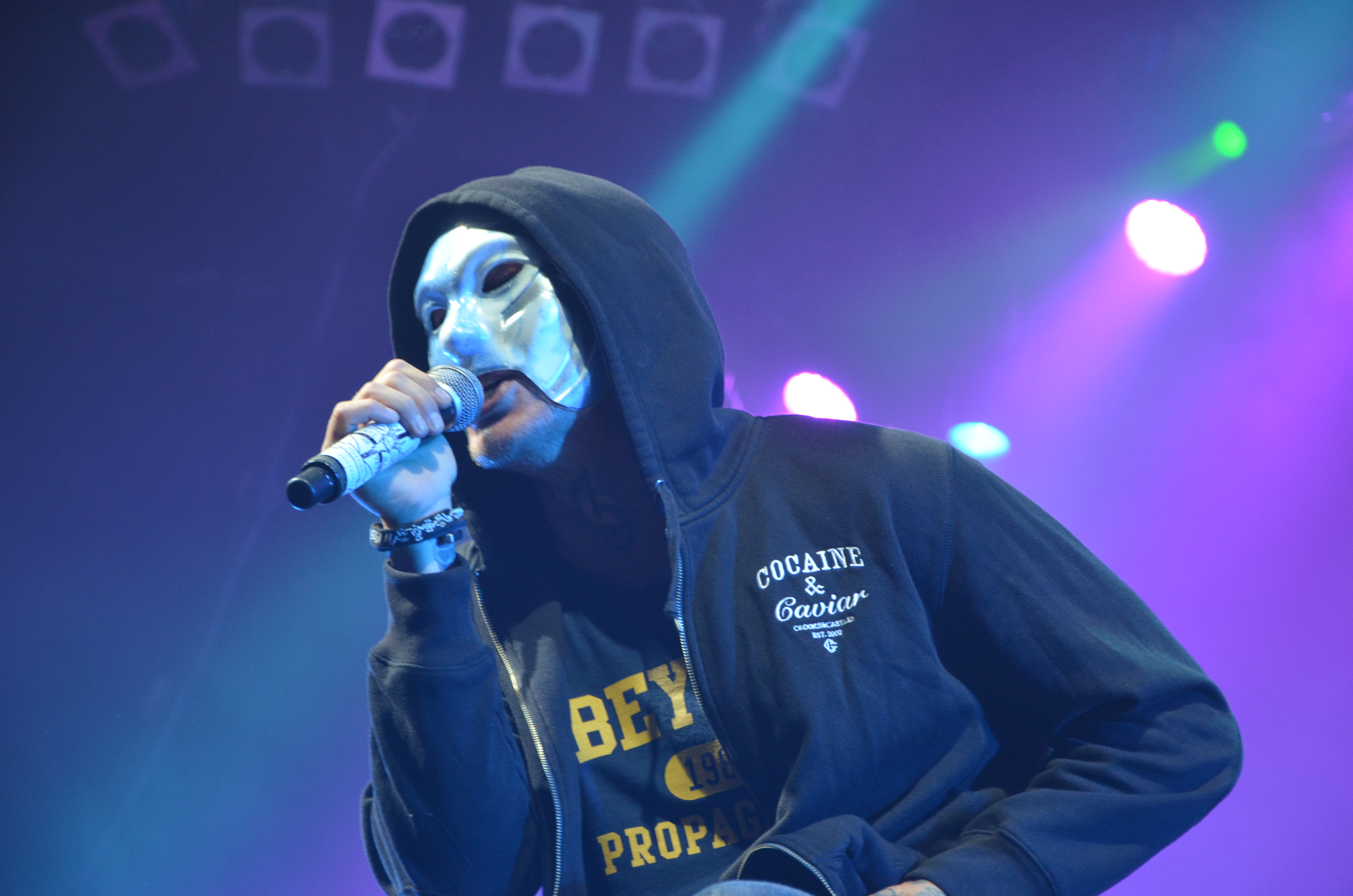
Ragan performing at the 2015 Rock am Ring in Germany with his mask on

Ragan co-founded Hollywood Undead in 2005; the band started out by posting their music to MySpace, and their popularity on the platform landed them a deal with MySpace Records after Tom Anderson took notice and invited the band out to dinner. In 2008, Ragan assisted in writing the band's breakthrough single "Undead", which reflects an expression of the band's frustrations after getting into the corporate side of the music industry. The song "Pour Me" (from the 2011 album American Tragedy), in which Ragan does all the rapping, contains introspective lyrics that chronicle his battle with alcohol. In 2012, Ragan helped write the song "We Are" as a means to inspire youth and teen fans; he started by writing the chorus for the song.

=== Solo career ===
On May 14, 2021, Ragan released a solo album titled The Abyss under the moniker "George Ragan the Dead Son". On March 27, 2024, he featured on the song "Vendetta" by TX2.

== Musical influences ==
Ragan has cited his ten most influential albums as Sea Change by Beck (2002), Enter the Wu-Tang (36 Chambers) by Wu-Tang Clan (1993), Pretty Hate Machine by Nine Inch Nails (1989), Relationship of Command by At the Drive-In (2000), Generation Rx by Good Charlotte (2018), For Those That Wish to Exist by Architects (2021), Now Or Never by Giggs (2020), Ghøstkid by Ghostkid (2020), Who Do You Trust? by Papa Roach (2019), and ...If You Don't Save Yourself by Zero 9:36 (2021).

== Other ventures ==
Since 2010, Ragan and Hollywood Undead bandmate J-Dog (birth name Jorel Decker) have run a cannabis business together called "Dove and Grenade". They began by growing in a few garages in the North Hollywood and Sylmar neighborhoods of Los Angeles. After the 2018 legalization of cannabis in Oklahoma for medical usage, Ragan and Decker moved their company's operations eastward to Lindsay, Oklahoma in 2019.

== Personal life ==
In an interview with Cryptic Rock, Ragan stated that he regularly meditates, and that he enjoys exploring the culture of places that he visits on tour. Around early 2020, Ragan moved from his native Los Angeles to Nashville for a "change of pace".
