= Deuce discography =

- Studio albums: 2
- Extended plays: 4
- Singles: 7
- Music videos: 7
- Mixtapes: 1
- Collaborations: 12

The discography of rap rock artist Deuce includes two studio albums, four extended plays, one mixtape, eleven singles, and ten music videos.

== Solo ==
=== Studio albums ===
Year	Album	Label	Chart peaks				
Year	Album	Label	US	US Rock	US Alt.	US Ind.	US Hard Rock
2012	Nine Lives	Five Seven Music	37	13	9	7	2
2017	Invincible	Better Noise Records	—	—	—	24	—

=== Extended plays ===
Year	Title	Record label	Tracks
2005	The Aron EP	self-released	No. / Title / Length; 1. / "Dreams"; 2. / "Fallen Stone"; 3. / "Far Away"; 4. / "Surface Air"
2008	The Two Thousand Eight EP	A&M Records/Octone Records	No. / Title / Length; 1. / "The One"; 2. / "Gravestone"; 3. / "Hollyhood Vacation" (featuring Truth); 4. / "Deuce Dot Com"
2012	Deuce Remixxxed EP	self-released	No. / Title / Length; 1. / "America" (Bl4ckout Remix); 2. / "Let's Get It Crackin'" (synx Remix); 3. / "America" (synx Remix); 4. / "Let's Get It Crackin" (Xenon Remix); 5. / "Let's Get It Crackin'" (Zombies Ahead! DubstepRMX); 6. / "Let's Get It Crackin" (Bl4ckout Remix); 7. / "America" (Virus Remix)
2018	Nightmare EP	Better Noise Records	No. / Title / Length; 1. / "Bleed"; 2. / "Do You Think About Me?"; 3. / "Famous" (featuring Gadjet); 4. / "Look At Me Now"; 5. / "Miracle"; 6. / "Nightmare"

=== Mixtapes ===
Year
2011
Title
The Call Me Big Deuce EP
Record label
Eleven Seven Music
Tracks

No.	Title	Length
1.	"When We Ride" (featuring Kinda Major, Truth, & Doebeezi (GML Member))
2.	"Break Them Wallz" (featuring Truth & Jeffree Star)
3.	"Story of a Snitch"
4.	"Circles"
5.	"Here in L.A." (featuring Truth)
6.	"Ambitionz Az a Ridah" (featuring Truth & Snype (GML Member))
7.	"Don't Approach Me"
8.	"Set It Off" (featuring Truth)
9.	"Sometimes"
10.	"You Don't Know" (Truth featuring Deuce)
11.	"Franny"
12.	"Blood On My Hands" (featuring Truth)
13.	"Breaking Through"
14.	"Who We Are" (featuring Tha Villa & Truth)

=== Singles ===
As lead artist

Year	Song	US Rock	US Main	Album
2011	"Let's Get It Crackin'" (featuring Jeffree Star)	—	—	Nine Lives
2012	"America"	41	16	Nine Lives
2012	"Help Me"	—	—	Nine Lives
2012	"Nobody Likes Me" (featuring Truth & Ronnie Radke)	—	—	Nine Lives
2012	"I Came to Party" (featuring Truth & Travie McCoy)	—	31	Nine Lives
2013	"The One"	—	—	Nine Lives
2017	"Here I Come"	—	—	Invincible
2017	"Bitch This is It"	—	—	Invincible
2017	"World on Fire"	—	—	Invincible
2017	"Thank You"	—	—	Invincible
2017	"Nightmare"	—	—	Nightmare

As featured artist

Year	Song	Artist	Album
2009	"Together"	Marc Bosserman	Together
2012	"Never Back Down"	brokeNCYDE	The Best of BC13
2012	"Rise and Shine"	Blood on the Dance Floor	Evolution
2013	"Will You Cry for Me "	Arina Chloe	Single
2014	"Jagger Swagger" (featuring Deuce & BastiBasti)	Electric Callboy	We Are the Mess
2014	"Who Can Stop Us?" (featuring Deuce & b.LaY)	Ronnie Radke	Watch Me
2014	"We're Takin' Over!"	Blood on the Dance Floor	Single
2014	"Fuck That" (featuring Deuce)	brokeNCYDE	Single
2016	"The Last Time" (featuring Deuce)	From Ashes to New	Single
2022	"Bring it Back" (featuring Deuce)	Tha Anarchist	Non-album single
2022	"Monsters" (featuring Deuce)	Hurricane On Saturn	Single

=== Music videos ===
As lead artist

Year	Song	Director(s)	Type	Link
2011	"Let's Get It Crackin'" (featuring Jeffree Star)	Nathan Cox	Performance	
2012	"America"	Nathan Cox	Performance	
2012	"Help Me"	Colin Real	Performance	
2012	"I Came to Party" (Album Version) (featuring Truth & Travie McCoy)	Nathan Cox	Performance	
2012	"I Came to Party" (Rock Radio Mix) (featuring Truth & Travie McCoy)	Nathan Cox	Performance	
2013	"The One"	James Jou	Performance	
2017	"Here I Come"		Narrative	

As featured artist

Year	Artist	Album	Song	Type	Link
2012	brokeNCYDE	The Best of BC13	"Never Back Down"	Performance	

== With Hollywood Undead ==
=== Studio albums ===
List of studio albums, with selected chart positions and certifications
Year	Album details	Peak chart positions						Sales	Certifications
Year	Album details	US	US Alt.	US Rock	CAN	NLD	UK	Sales	Certifications
2008	Swan Songs: Released: September 2, 2008 (US); Label: A&M/Octone, Polydor; Formats: CD, digital download	22	—	8	—	90	85	US: 1,000,000+	RIAA: Platinum

=== Live albums ===
List of live albums, with selected chart positions
Year	Album details	Peak chart positions		
Year	Album details	US	US Alt.	US Rock
2009	Desperate Measures: Released: November 10, 2009 (US); Label: A&M/Octone; Formats: CD, digital download	29	8	10

=== Extended plays ===
List of extended plays, with selected chart positions
Title	Details	Peak chart positions	
Title	Details	US	US Rock
2009	Swan Songs B-Sides EP: Released: June 23, 2009; Label: A&M/Octone; Formats: Digital download	124	50
2010	Swan Songs Rarities EP: Released: April 20, 2010; Label: A&M/Octone; Formats: Digital download	—	—
2010	Black Dahlia Remixes: Released: September 13, 2010; Label: A&M/Octone; Formats: Digital download	—	—
"—" denotes a recording that did not chart or was not released in that territory.

=== Singles ===
List of singles, with selected chart positions, showing year released and album name
year	song	Peak chart positions					Album
year	song	US Bub.	US Alt.	US Main. Rock	US Rock	UK	Album
2008	"No. 5"	—	—	—	—	—	Swan Songs
2008	"Undead"	4	12	10	—	145	Swan Songs
2008	"Christmas in Hollywood"	—	—	—	—	—	Non-album single
2009	"Young"	—	34	28	—	—	Swan Songs
2009	"This Love, This Hate"	—	—	—	—	—	Swan Songs
2009	"Dove and Grenade"	—	—	—	—	—	Desperate Measures
2010	"Everywhere I Go"	—	38	—	—	—	Swan Songs
2010	"Black Dahlia"	—	—	—	—	—	Swan Songs

=== Music videos ===
List of music videos, showing year released and director
Year	Song	Album	Director(s)	Type	Link
2006	"No. 5" (version 1)	Single	Don Salvatore, Steven B.	Performance	
2008	"No. 5" (version 2)	Swan Songs	Jonas Åkerlund	Tour footage	
2008	"Undead"	Swan Songs	Jonas Åkerlund	Tour footage	
2009	"Young"	Swan Songs	Kevin Kerslake	Narrative	
2009	"Everywhere I Go"	Swan Songs	Jordon Terrell, Spence Nicholson	Performance	
