= Nathan Cox =

American music video director

Nathan "Karma" Cox is an American music video director and editor known for his work with rock, alternative metal, nu metal, and industrial rock artists. His directing credits include music videos for Linkin Park, System of a Down, Disturbed, Coal Chamber, Korn, Marilyn Manson, Queens of the Stone Age, Chevelle, and Suicide Silence.

Cox's career became closely associated with the emergence and commercial popularity of nu metal during the late 1990s and early 2000s. Among his best-known works is Linkin Park's "In the End" (2001), which he co-directed with Joe Hahn and which won Best Rock Video at the 2002 MTV Video Music Awards.

In addition to directing, Cox has worked extensively as an editor, with credits including music videos for Metallica, Foo Fighters, U2, and other recording artists.

== Career ==
=== Early career and the rise of nu metal (1990s–2000) ===
Cox established himself as a music video director during the late 1990s, working with emerging alternative metal and nu-metal acts.

One of his early directing projects was Coal Chamber's "Loco" (1997), for which he received a Music Video Production Association nomination in the Directorial Debut category.

In 1998, Cox directed and edited the music video for System of a Down's "Sugar", from the band's self-titled debut album. The video featured a combination of performance footage and satirical television-news imagery. It subsequently received a Billboard Music Video Award nomination for Best Hard Rock Video.

Cox continued working with emerging metal acts, directing Disturbed's "Stupify" (2000), the lead single from the band's debut album, The Sickness. The video also received a Billboard Music Video Award nomination for Best Hard Rock Video.

=== Linkin Park and mainstream recognition (2001–2003) ===
In 2001, Cox collaborated with Linkin Park during the promotion of the band's debut album, Hybrid Theory.

He co-directed the music videos for "Papercut" and "In the End" with band member Joe Hahn. The latter video combined live-action performances with computer-generated environments, presenting the band within a fantasy landscape featuring monumental architecture, animated vegetation, and changing weather.

The production was filmed in Los Angeles during a break in the band's 2001 Ozzfest touring schedule. Its visual concept drew upon fantasy imagery and Art Nouveau influences.

"In the End" won Best Rock Video at the 2002 MTV Video Music Awards and was also nominated for Video of the Year and Best Group Video.

Cox additionally edited the music video for Linkin Park's "Points of Authority", using concert and touring footage.

During this period, he continued his association with Disturbed, directing videos including "Down with the Sickness" and "Liberate", and worked on concert and documentary releases involving Disturbed and Korn.

=== Established rock and metal artists (2003–2010) ===
During the 2000s, Cox directed videos for an increasingly diverse group of rock and metal artists.

His projects included Chevelle's "The Red", "Vitamin R (Leading Us Along)", and "The Clincher"; Marilyn Manson's "Personal Jesus"; Queens of the Stone Age's "Little Sister"; and Disturbed's "Stricken" and "Inside the Fire".

Cox also directed Marilyn Manson's "Running to the Edge of the World" and Korn's "Let the Guilt Go".

His editing work during this period included projects associated with Metallica and Foo Fighters. Metallica's "I Disappear" and Foo Fighters' "Best of You" received MTV Video Music Award nominations for Best Editing.

=== Later music video work (2010s–present) ===
Cox continued directing music videos through the 2010s, including projects for Suicide Silence, Seether, Five Finger Death Punch, Black Veil Brides, Of Mice & Men, and other rock and metal acts.

His work with Suicide Silence included "You Only Live Once", "Slave to Substance", and "You Can't Stop Me".

Other projects included Seether's "Same Damn Life" and "Save Today", Five Finger Death Punch's "I Apologize", and The Fray's "Love Don't Die".

Alongside his music video career, Cox has directed and edited short films, commercials, and branded entertainment.

== Directing and editing ==
Cox has worked in both music video direction and post-production editing. His career includes projects for which he served as both director and editor, as well as productions for which he was credited solely as editor.

His editing credits include Metallica's "I Disappear", Foo Fighters' "Best of You", U2's "Original of the Species", and The Fray's "How to Save a Life".

== Videography ==
2023

- "Anthem Embattled " – Against the Grave

2019

- "Killing Us Slowly" – Against the Grave

2017

- "Poontang Boomerang" – Steel Panther
- "Betray and Degrade" – Seether

2016

- "I Apologize" – Five Finger Death Punch
- "Stick to Your Guns" – Sick Puppies
- "Destroy Something Beautiful" – Media Solution

2015

- "Save Today" – Seether
- "Tonight We Ride" – Unleash the Archers

2014

- "Would You Still Be There" – Of Mice & Men
- "You Can't Stop Me" – Suicide Silence
- "Same Damn Life" – Seether

2013

- "Love Don't Die" – the Fray
- "Hopeless Wanderer" – Mumford & Sons (editor, dir. Sam Jones)

2012

- "I Came to Party" – Deuce

2011

- "The Last Time" – All That Remains
- "Fallen Angels" – Black Veil Brides
- "You Only Live Once" – Suicide Silence
- "Let's Get It Crackin'" – Deuce
- "America" – Deuce
- "Walk" – Foo Fighters (editor, dir. Sam Jones)

2010

- "Gods and Punks" – Monster Magnet
- "Let the Guilt Go" – Korn
- "My Soul Still Burns" – Media Solution

2009

- "Running to the Edge of the World" – Marilyn Manson
- "No Surprise" – Daughtry
- "Jars" – Chevelle
- "Stingwray" – Static-X

2008

- "Inside the Fire" – Disturbed
- "Runnin' Wild" – Airbourne

2007

- "Not All Who Wander Are Lost" – DevilDriver
- "One Love" – Aiden
- "The Running Free" – Coheed and Cambria
- "You Wouldn't Know" – Hellyeah

2006

- "Our Truth" – Lacuna Coil
- "Killing Loneliness" – HIM
- "Anthem (We Are the Fire)" – Trivium
- "Enjoy the Silence" – Lacuna Coil
- "Closer" – Lacuna Coil
- "Drownin" – Shurman
- "The River" – Live
- "How to Save a Life" – the Fray (editor, dir. Mark Pellington)

2005

- "Little Sister" – Queens of the Stone Age
- "The Clincher" – Chevelle
- "Drive Away" – Gratitude
- "Personal Jesus" – Marilyn Manson
- "Liberate" – Disturbed
- "Alone (No More)" – Craving Theo
- "Right Here" – Staind
- "Stricken" – Disturbed
- "Eagles Become Vultures" – Converge (editor, dir. Zach Merck)
- "Best of You" – Foo Fighters (editor, dir. Mark Pellington)

2004

- "Vitamin R (Leading Us Along)" – Chevelle
- "Redefine" – SOiL
- "Looks Like They Were Right" – Lit
- "Guilty" – The Rasmus

2003

- "Good Times" – Finger Eleven
- "Something Beautiful" – Cauterize

2002

- "I Feel So" – Box Car Racer (co-directed with Tom DeLonge)
- "Cold" – Static-X (co-directed with Mr. Hahn)
- "The Red" – Chevelle
- "Pitiful" – Blindside
- "Dem Girlz (I Don't Know Why)" – Oxide & Neutrino

2001

- "Angel's Son" – various artists (including members of Snot, Korn, Sevendust, Slipknot, System of a Down, Coal Chamber, Limp Bizkit and Sugar Ray)
- "Papercut" – Linkin Park (co-directed with Joe "Mr. Hahn" Hahn)
- "In the End" – Linkin Park (also co-directed with Mr. Hahn)
- "Points of Authority" – Linkin Park
- "Crashing Around You" – Machine Head
- "Moto Psycho" – Megadeth
- "Down with the Sickness" – Disturbed

2000

- "Ty Jonathan Down" – Videodrone featuring Jonathan Davis
- "Synthetic" – Spineshank
- "Satisfied" – 8stops7
- "Stupify" – Disturbed
- "What's the Dillio?" – Mest

1998

- "Sugar" – System of a Down

1997

- "Loco" – Coal Chamber

== DVDs ==
- "Music as a Weapon II" – Disturbed, Ünloco, Taproot and Chevelle
- "M.O.L." – Disturbed
- "Deuce" – Korn
- "Who Then Now?" – Korn
- "Frat Party at the Pankake Festival" – Linkin Park
