= Tony Lovato =

American singer

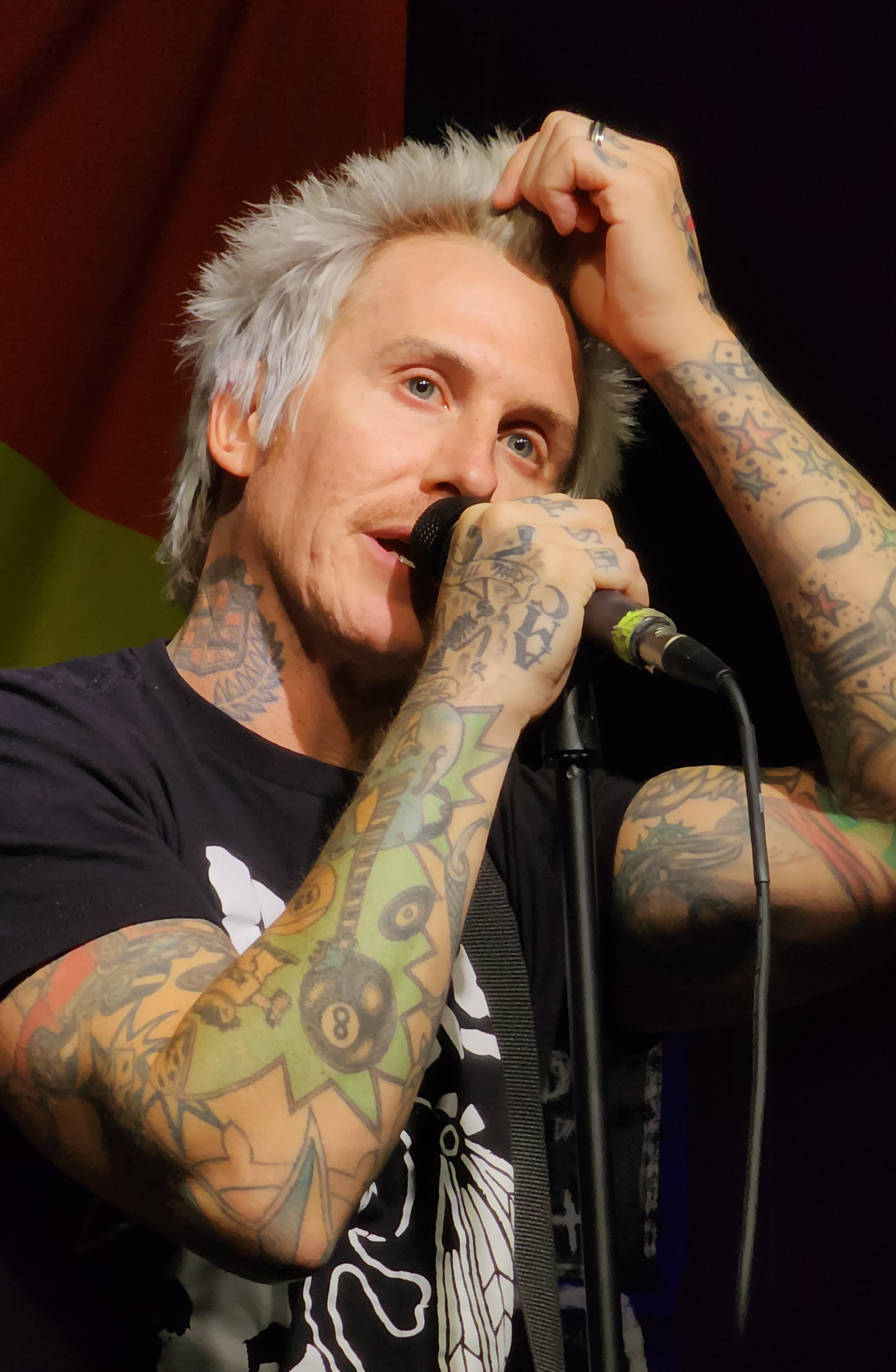
- Lovato performing in 2023

Background information
- Born: Anthony Cappiello John Lovato; June 20, 1980 (age 46); Blue Island, Illinois, U.S.
- Genres: Pop punk; punk rock; indie rock; alternative rock; ska punk; melodic hardcore (early)
- Occupations: Singer; musician; songwriter
- Instruments: Vocals; guitar
- Years active: 1995–present
- Member of: Mest; Kisses for Kings; London Falling
- Children: 5

Anthony Cappiello John Lovato (born June 20, 1980) is an American musician who serves as the vocalist and guitarist of the pop punk band Mest.

== Early life ==
Lovato was born in Blue Island, Illinois. He started getting involved in music at 12 years old and played drums for the White power band Confederate Storm. Lovato later condemned his actions, stating that he left the band at the age of 13 or 14, thinking, "This isn't who I am. I've got Mexican friends and I've got black friends, and I don't dislike them, so how can I be part of this when my true feelings are everything that's not that?" He later became involved in anti-racist activism, drawing on his experience to educate others on issues of race and influence.

== Musical career ==
=== Mest (1995–2006, 2008–present) ===
Lovato, his brother Steve and their cousin Matt founded Mest in 1995. Lovato wrote the majority of the lyrics for their self-released debut studio album Mo' Money, Mo' 40z, released in 1998. Their major label debut, Wasting Time, was released in July 2000 via Maverick Records. Their third studio album Destination Unknown, was released in October 2001. The band's self-titled album was released in June 2003, produced by John Feldmann. Their fifth album, Photographs, was released in October 2005. In 2006, the band announced on their Myspace page that they were disbanding.

In October 2008, Lovato staged a reunion tour of Mest, with Steve Lovato taking bass guitar duties, Chris Wilson (formerly of Good Charlotte) taking over on drums, and Ryan Clayton covering lead guitar. None of the other former members of Mest took part in the reunion.

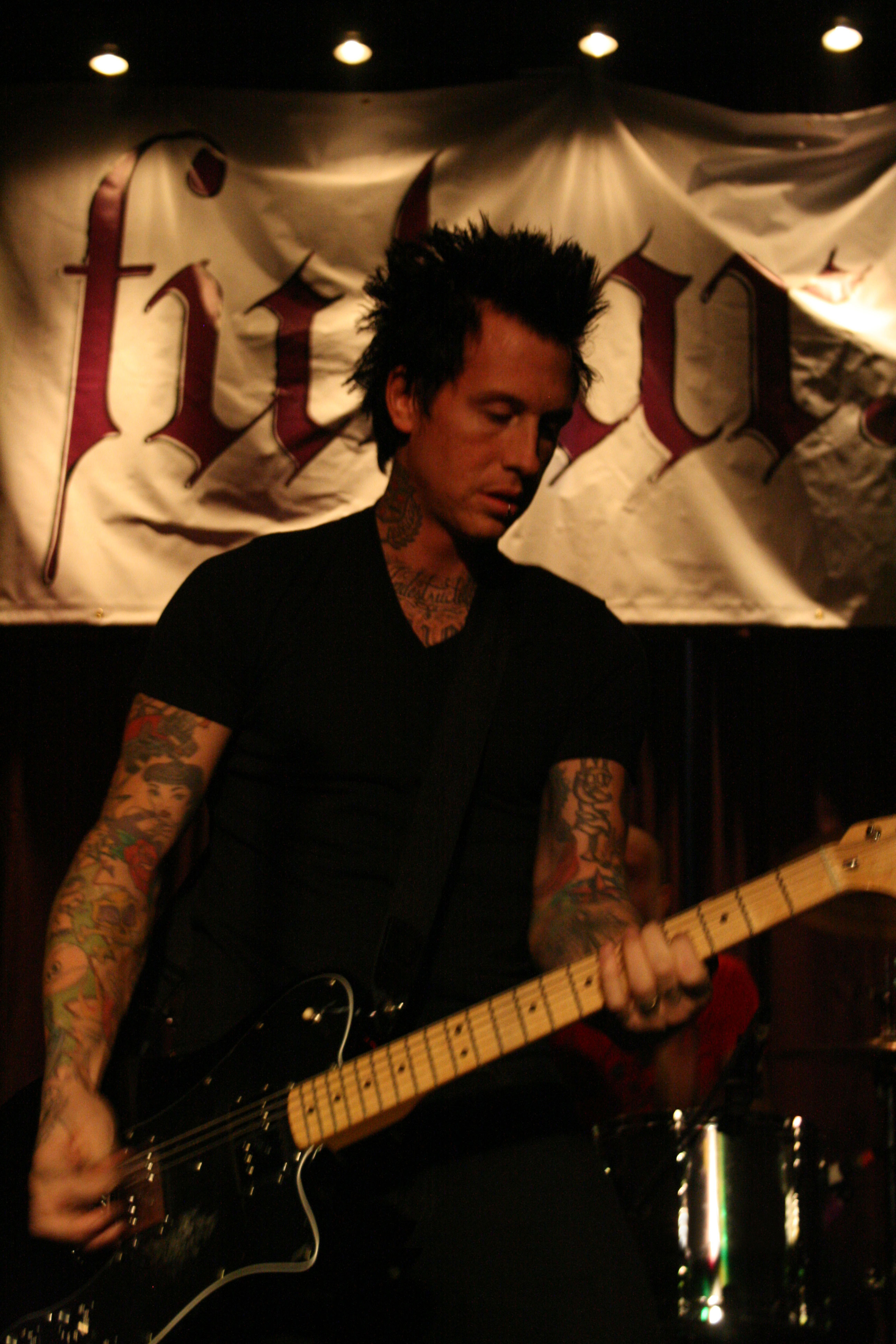
Lovato performing in 2008

A brief reunion a few years later set the stage for the band to get back together, and they toured as well as releasing the sixth studio album Not What You Expected in January 2013. Their first acoustic album, Broken Down, was released in March 2014, and their second, Broken Down 2, in October 2017.

On September 13, 2019, they released a single titled "The Upside Down" from the seventh studio album, Masquerade, which was released in January 2020.

On April 10, 2024, Mest released their new single "When We Were Young", and released "Hate You Sober" on May 16, 2024, both were featured on their eighth studio album Youth, which was released on June 20, 2024

=== Kisses for Kings (2006–2011) ===
In 2006, after Lovato moved to Los Angeles, he started his new project, A Permanent Holiday. Founding members included Jordon "Charlie Scene" Terrell (of Hollywood Undead) on guitar, Jorell "J-Dog" Decker (of Hollywood Undead) on bass and Adam Garbett (of Just Ask) on drums. Shortly after its launch, he gave a preview of the new project with several demos including "The Thought of You", "A Taste of Honesty", "The Night" and another unmixed demo called "SOS". They have performed on the 2007 Warped Tour and toured in July 2009 with Hollywood Undead, Red Jumpsuit Apparatus and The Sleeping on the "Taking Care of Business Tour".

In 2009, the band announced they would be returning with new name Kisses for Kings an entirely new lineup – Lovato on vocals, Mike Longworth on guitar, Ryan Clayton on bass, and Richie Gonzales on drums – and released five demo tracks titled "Like Always" (featuring M. Shadows), "Forgive Me", "Bad Disease", "You Don't Know What I Know" and "Risk It All".

In May 2010, the band released debut EP Forget to Remember which included collaborations with Deuce, Johnny 3 Tears and Craig Mabbitt.

After releasing the EP in 2010, no public updates were made regarding the future of Kisses for Kings.

=== London Falling (2015) ===
In 2015, Lovato started new project with former Falling in Reverse bassist, Ronnie Ficarro, called London Falling. In April 2016, the band released their debut single "Nightmare" off their upcoming EP. In 2015, Lovato performed twice for each concert on the Three-Headed Monstour, once with London Falling and once with Mest.

=== Other appearances ===
Lovato appeared in Good Charlotte's music videos for "Festival Song", "The Anthem" and "Like It's Her Birthday". He also made an appearance in Escape the Fate's music video "Something" and "City of Sin", Hollywood Undead's music video "Everywhere I Go" and The Vibrators's music video "One More".

== Legal issues ==
In 2007, Lovato was jailed on suspicion of murder in Los Angeles after police said he confessed to stabbing his then-current girlfriend's ex-boyfriend. He was held in lieu of $1 million bail after telling police that he was assaulted earlier in the day by Wayne Hughes, 25, in the underground parking lot of Archstone Apartments in the suburb of Studio City. On March 26, 2007, Good Charlotte's Benji and Joel Madden expressed their sadness, telling MTV Radio, "We're all praying for him. We're really bummed. We all have faith that it'll all work out for the best." The following day, Lovato was released from jail and homicide charges against him were dropped. A spokeswoman for the Los Angeles District Attorney's office stated: "We determined that the suspect and victim had dated the same girl back-and-forth for over a year. There had been threats, and the victim sent several threatening messages to the suspect. Apparently, there was some mutual combat and Lovato attempted to separate himself from the victim when the victim challenged him to a fight. The victim followed Lovato to an isolated spot in the underground garage and tried to fight him. Lovato defended himself, and there was insufficient evidence to show that it was not a justifiable use of reasonable force in self-defense".

== Discography ==
with Mest

- Mo' Money, Mo' 40z (1998)
- Wasting Time (2000)
- Destination Unknown (2001)
- Mest (2003)
- Photographs (2005)
- Not What You Expected (2013)
- Broken Down (2014)
- Broken Down 2 (2017)
- Masquerade (2020)
- Youth (2024)

with Kisses for Kings

- Forget to Remember (EP; 2010)

with London Falling

- "Nightmare" (Single, 2016)
- "London Falling" (EP, 2016)

Collaborations

- "Stand Your Ground" by Holly Would Surrender (Kaleidoscope, 2016)
- "Gone Forever" by NewDrive (Closed Doors and Broken Mirrors, 2016)
- "Where the Highway Ends" by TLE (Single, 2018)
- "The World in My Hands" by Ice Nine Kills (The Silver Scream, 2018)
- "Can You Feel the Love Tonight" by Punk Rock Factory (A Whole New Wurst, 2020)
- "Disconnected (Face to Face Cover)" by Mikey and His Uke (Single, 2021)
- "SOS" by Amber Facific (All In, 2025)
