= Broken Down (Mest album) =

Studio album by Mest
- Released: March 25, 2014
- Genre: Pop punk, alternative rock, acoustic rock
- Label: Self-released

Mest chronology
Not What You Expected (2013)	Broken Down (2014)	Broken Down 2 (2017)

Broken Down is an acoustic album from American pop punk band Mest. On November 13, 2013, a Kickstarter was started by Tony Lovato, and was successfully funded December 11. Much of the songs are acoustic renditions of songs from almost all their albums except "Mo' Money, Mo' 40z" and Not What You Expected.

== Track listing ==
1. "Lost Broken Confused" - 3:01
2. "Last Kiss" - 3:52
3. "Rooftops" - 4:16
4. "2000 Miles" - 3:27
5. "Fuct Up Kid" - 2:12
6. "Drawing Board" - 3:48
7. "As His Black Heart Dies" - 3:29
8. "Jaded (These Years)" - 3:10
9. "Keeps Me Movin On" - 2:52
10. "Wasting My Time" - 5:01
11. "Mother's Prayer" - 2:45
12. "Walking on Broken Glass" - 3:44
13. "Hotel Room" - 2:40
14. "Take Me Away (Cried out to Heaven)" - 4:19
- Tracks 6, 10, and 13 are acoustic versions of songs from Wasting Time
- Tracks 5, 9, and 11 are acoustic versions of songs from Destination Unknown
- Tracks 1, 3, 4, 8, and 12 are acoustic versions of songs from Mest
- Tracks 2, 7, and 14 are acoustic versions of songs from Photographs
