= Vitamin R =

Vitamin R may refer to:

- Rum
- Methylphenidate, also known as Ritalin or Vitamin R
- "Vitamin R (Leading Us Along)", a song by Chevelle
- Rainier Beer, a popular brand of beer in the Pacific Northwest of the United States
