= Well Enough Alone =

Single by Chevelle

from the album Vena Sera
- Released: March 6, 2007
- Length: 4:18
- Label: Epic
- Songwriters: Pete Loeffler; Sam Loeffler
- Producer: Michael "Elvis" Baskette

Chevelle singles chronology
"Panic Prone" (2005)	"Well Enough Alone" (2007)	"I Get It" (2007)

Music video
- "Well Enough Alone" on YouTube

"Well Enough Alone" is a song by American rock band Chevelle. It is the first single from the album Vena Sera and was released to radio the week of February 13, 2007. According to lead singer Pete Loeffler, "Well Enough Alone" was an unreleased song that had been recorded prior to the release of their third album This Type of Thinking (Could Do Us In), before it was refined for Vena Sera.

== Critical reception ==
Loudwire ranked it the ninth greatest Chevelle song.

== Track listing ==
No.	Title	Length
1.	"Well Enough Alone" (radio edit)	3:42
2.	"Well Enough Alone" (album version)	4:18

== Music video ==
The music video which is directed by Brian Scott Weber intercuts footage of the band performing with shots of the band jumping in and out of water which was done with the help of special effects.

== Personnel ==
- Pete Loeffler – vocals, guitar
- Dean Bernardini – bass
- Sam Loeffler – drums
- Michael "Elvis" Baskette – producer

== Charts ==
=== Weekly charts ===
Weekly chart performance for "Well Enough Alone"
Chart (2007)	Peak position
Canada Rock (Billboard)	50
US Bubbling Under Hot 100 (Billboard)	19
US Alternative Airplay (Billboard)	9
US Mainstream Rock (Billboard)	4

=== Year-end charts ===
Year-end chart performance for "Well Enough Alone"
Chart (2007)	Position
US Alternative Songs (Billboard)	36
US Mainstream Rock Songs (Billboard)	19
