= Sci-Fi Crimes =

Studio album by Chevelle
- Released: August 31, 2009
- Recorded: 2009
- Studios: Modernist Movement, Nashville, Tennessee
- Genres: Alternative metal; hard rock
- Length: 43:23
- Label: Epic
- Producers: Brian Virtue; Chevelle

Chevelle chronology
Vena Sera (2007)	Sci-Fi Crimes (2009)	Hats Off to the Bull (2011)

Singles from Sci-Fi Crimes
- 1. "Jars" Released: June 23, 2009; 2. "Letter from a Thief" Released: December 7, 2009; 3. "Shameful Metaphors" Released: July 13, 2010

Sci-Fi Crimes is the fifth studio album by the American rock band Chevelle, released on August 31, 2009 through Epic Records.

== Background ==
The album was recorded in Nashville, Tennessee, in 2009 with producer Brian Virtue. On April 9, 2009, Chevelle debuted two new songs, "Letter from a Thief" and "Sleep Apnea" at a concert in Atlanta, Georgia. Vocalist Pete Loeffler stated that the tracks were "possible singles" off the album. "Jars" was the first single from the album and began radio airplay on June 23. The track list and artwork were revealed July 21, 2009, in addition to a pre-order being made available which included the ability to download three tracks: "Jars", "This Circus", and "The Clincher (Version 103)" (an alternate version of the track from This Type of Thinking (Could Do Us In)). The album cover is an oil painting made by bassist Dean Bernardini on a 24x48 canvas. "Letter from a Thief" was the second single from the album and began radio airplay on December 7, 2009. "Shameful Metaphors" is the third single from the album and began radio airplay on July 12, 2010. A live performance music video for "Shameful Metaphors" premiered on September 16, 2010.

== Recording ==
Unlike previous albums, Sci-Fi Crimes was recorded live in the studio as a band, without the use of samples. "We wanted to do a record that was more true to what our live sound is like," explains Sam Loeffler. "We wanted to go in the studio and play the tracks and just record them and not make a perfect record the way I think a lot of our records in the past have been made. We wanted to compete on that same level by not tuning the vocals and not tuning every single chord and not adding samples so every single snare hit is exactly the same. We just went in and recorded. It's not a sonically perfect record; it's more like you get if you go into a studio and just play. And I'm curious to see if people notice a difference."

== Reception ==
Professional ratings
Review scores
Source	Rating
About.com	3.5/5 stars
AllMusic	4/5 stars
CHARTattack	3/5 stars
FAZER Online Music Magazine	favorable
Hearwax	7.5/10 stars
Melodic	3/5 stars
Sputnikmusic	3.0/5
USA Today	3/4 stars

Tim Grierson at About.com states "...even at its most accessible, the album never lets up on the unease." in regards to what makes the album so good. Jared Johnson of Allmusic says "This is most certainly the same band that draws frequent comparisons to Tool, with its crunchy guitar attack and Loeffler's unforgettable vocal delivery. But it's their ability to pull off such flippant tales with their characteristic punch that gives Sci-Fi Crimes a humanizing appeal not found on their previous records." Sputnikmusic states the album "feels like the fifth installment of music they've produced over their lifetimes." USA Today comments "Sci-Fi Crimes scrapes some of the polish off the band's sound. What remains is both sturdy and versatile".

== Track listing ==
All tracks are written by Pete Loeffler.

No.	Title	Length
1.	"Sleep Apnea"	3:51
2.	"Mexican Sun"	4:15
3.	"Shameful Metaphors"	4:21
4.	"Jars"	3:19
5.	"Fell into Your Shoes"	5:06
6.	"Letter from a Thief"	3:27
7.	"Highland's Apparition"	4:08
8.	"Roswell's Spell"	4:37
9.	"Interlewd"	1:21
10.	"A New Momentum"	4:25
11.	"This Circus"	4:32
Total length:		43:28

iTunes bonus track
No.	Title	Length
12.	"Sleep Apnea" (acoustic)	2:22
Total length:		45:45

Hot Topic/ShockHound bonus tracks
No.	Title	Length
12.	"The Gist" (instrumental)	1:44
13.	"Leto's Headache"	4:21
Total length:		49:33

== Personnel ==
Chevelle

- Pete Loeffler – vocals, guitar
- Sam Loeffler – drums
- Dean Bernardini – bass

Production

- Brian Virtue – producer, engineer, mixing
- Chevelle – co-producer
- Kyle Mann – assistant engineer
- John Netti – assistant engineer
- Ted Jensen – mastering

Artwork

- Dean Bernardini – album cover
- Invisible Creature, Inc. – album design
- Jerad Knudson – photography
- Mark Samuels – painting photography

== Commercial performance ==
The album was released on August 31, 2009, debuting at No. 6 on the US Billboard 200 with sales of about 46,000, the highest entry on the chart for the band, before being surpassed by their seventh studio album La Gárgola in 2014. As of January 2013, it has sold over 200,000 copies according to Nielsen Soundscan.

== Charts ==
=== Weekly charts ===
Chart (2009–10)	Peak position
Canadian Albums (Billboard)	21
US Billboard 200	6
US Top Alternative Albums (Billboard)	1
US Digital Albums (Billboard)	3
US Top Hard Rock Albums (Billboard)	1
US Top Rock Albums (Billboard)	3
US Indie Store Album Sales (Billboard)	8

Singles

Year	Song	Chart	Peak position
2009	"Jars"	Billboard Bubbling Under Hot 100 Singles	10
2009	"Jars"	Billboard Hot Mainstream Rock Tracks	3
2009	"Jars"	Billboard Alternative Songs	5
2009	"Jars"	Billboard Rock Songs	2
2009	"Letter from a Thief"	Billboard Hot Mainstream Rock Tracks	3
2009	"Letter from a Thief"	Billboard Alternative Songs	5
2009	"Letter from a Thief"	Billboard Rock Songs	4
2010	"Shameful Metaphors"	Billboard Hot Mainstream Rock Tracks	28
2010	"Shameful Metaphors"	Billboard Alternative Songs	22
2010	"Shameful Metaphors"	Billboard Rock Songs	25
