= Desperate Measures (Hollywood Undead album) =

Live album by Hollywood Undead
- Released: November 10, 2009
- Recorded: Early to Mid 2009
- Genre: Rap rock; rapcore; hip hop; alternative rock
- Length: 44:52
- Label: A&M/Octone
- Producer: Chief the Dog

Hollywood Undead non-studio album chronology
Swan Songs B-Sides (2009)	Desperate Measures (2009)	Swan Songs Rarities (2010)

Singles from Desperate Measures
- 1. "Dove and Grenade" Released: July 2009

Professional ratings
Review scores
Source	Rating
AllMusic	1.5/5 stars

Desperate Measures is the first live album by American rap rock band Hollywood Undead. The album was released on November 10, 2009, through A&M Records and Octone Records. The album includes three new songs, three cover songs, a remix of "Everywhere I Go", and six live versions of previously released tracks from a concert in Albuquerque, New Mexico along with a 60-minute DVD of live performances. The album debuted at No. 29 on the Billboard 200, No. 10 on Top Rock Albums, and No. 15 on Top Digital Albums.

== Track listing ==
=== Disc One (CD) ===
Standard Edition
No.	Title	Length
1.	"Dove and Grenade"	2:54
2.	"Tear It Up"	3:14
3.	"Shout at the Devil" (Mötley Crüe cover)	3:20
4.	"Immigrant Song" (Led Zeppelin cover)	2:40
5.	"Bad Town" (Operation Ivy cover)	2:44
6.	"El Urgencia"	3:44
7.	"Everywhere I Go" (Castle Renholdër mix)	3:30
8.	"Undead" (live (Note: Same audio as live video recording on the Disc 2 DVD.))	4:48
9.	"Sell Your Soul" (live (Note: Different live recording than DVD.))	3:23
10.	"California" (live)	3:20
11.	"Black Dahlia" (live)	3:55
12.	"Everywhere I Go" (live)	3:44
13.	"No. 5" (live)	3:29
Total length:		44:52

iTunes Bonus Tracks
No.	Title	Length
14.	"City" (live)	3:34
15.	"Bottle and a Gun" (live (Note: Available with iTunes pre-orders only. Same audio as DVD.))	4:54

=== Disc Two (DVD) ===
Live at the Sunshine Theater, Albuquerque, New Mexico and the Marquee Theater, Tempe, Arizona. The concert footage is bracketed by "interlude" segments of audience interaction, as well as interview and behind-the-scenes footage, much of it black-and-white, between many of the songs.

No.	Title	Length
1.	"Intro/Undead"	4:25
2.	"Sell Your Soul"	3:14
3.	"Faking the Folk"
4.	"Bottle and a Gun"	3:22
5.	"What's in a Name"
6.	"California"	3:16
7.	"First Time"
8.	"No Other Place"	3:16
9.	"City"	3:33
10.	"Favorite"
11.	"Paradise Lost"	3:10
12.	"Black Dahlia"	3:45
13.	"Young"	3:16
14.	"I Think I Just Puked My Soul Out"
15.	"Everywhere I Go"	3:30
16.	"Lovin' Da Kurlzz"
17.	"No. 5"	3:05

== Personnel ==
- Aron "Deuce" Erlichman – vocals, bass guitar, keyboards, production, mixing, mastering
- Jordon "Charlie Scene" Terrell – vocals, lead guitar
- Jorel "J-Dog" Decker – vocals, rhythm guitar, bass guitar, keyboards, synthesizers, programming
- George "Johnny 3 Tears" Ragan – vocals
- Dylan "Funny Man" Alvarez – vocals
- Matthew "Da Kurlzz" Busek – vocals, drums, percussion

=== Additional musicians ===
- Glendon "Biscuitz" Crain – drums

=== Additional personnel ===
- Danny Lohner, Don Gilmore, Kevin Shirley, Ben Grosse and Jon Kaplan – production, mixing, mastering

== Charts ==
Chart (2010)	Peak position
US Billboard 200	29
US Top Digital Albums	15
US Top Hard Rock Albums	5
US Top Alternative Albums	8
US Top Rock Albums	10
