= Jars (song) =

Single by Chevelle

from the album Sci-Fi Crimes
- Released: June 23, 2009
- Studio: Modernist Movement (Nashville, Tennessee)
- Length: 3:19
- Label: Epic
- Songwriters: Pete Loeffler; Sam Loeffler
- Producer: Brian Virtue

Chevelle singles chronology
| "The Fad" (2008) | "Jars" (2009) | "Letter from a Thief" (2009) |

Music video
- "Jars" on YouTube

"Jars" is a song by American rock band Chevelle. It is the first single from the band's fifth studio album Sci-Fi Crimes. It was released to radio stations on June 23, 2009 and also as a digital download on Chevelle's website. Drummer Sam Loeffler told 99.3 The Fox that this song's subject matter reflects the quirky themes of Sci-Fi Crimes. He explained that the song is, "a kind of a play on words. It's saving the environment. It's a joke about saving the environment and it's about literally taking the earth, and putting it into jars to save it for later. It's very tongue in cheek."

== Music video ==
The official music video was released on August 25, 2009. It features the band singing at night, on a wheat field, while illustrating the story of a man kidnapped in a speeding Crown Victoria, who tries to escape. The video has two alternate endings, both starting out when the man takes control of the driver's seat and remove a brick from the gas pedal, slowing the car down. A note found on the brick reads "Croatoan." One ending features an extremely brief shot of the man looking up in shock as the car explodes. The second ending features the man safely running out of the car, followed by the explosion.

The band has stated in multiple interviews that they had no involvement in the video's development and do not understand the video's meaning, assuming there is one.

The video was inspired from the short film "Lucky" by Nash Edgerton.

== Track listing ==
| No. | Title | Length |
|---|---|---|
| 1. | "Jars" | 3:19 |
| 2. | "The Clincher (Version 103)" | 3:39 |

== Charts ==
=== Weekly charts ===
Weekly chart performance for "Jars"
| Chart (2009) | Peak position |
|---|---|
| Canada Rock (Billboard) | 36 |
| US Bubbling Under Hot 100 (Billboard) | 10 |
| US Hot Rock & Alternative Songs (Billboard) | 2 |

=== Year-end charts ===
Year-end chart performance for "Jars"
| Chart (2009) | Position |
|---|---|
| US Hot Rock Songs (Billboard) | 14 |

== Certifications ==
Certifications for "Jars"
| Region | Certification | Certified units/sales |
|---|---|---|
| United States (RIAA) | Gold | 500,000^{‡} |
^{‡} Sales+streaming figures based on certification alone.
