= Panic Prone =

Single by Chevelle

from the album This Type of Thinking (Could Do Us In)
- Released: July 19, 2005
- Length: 3:50
- Label: Epic
- Songwriters: Pete Loeffler; Sam Loeffler; Joe Loeffler
- Producer: Michael "Elvis" Baskette

Chevelle singles chronology
"The Clincher" (2005)	"Panic Prone" (2005)	"Well Enough Alone" (2007)

Audio video
- "Panic Prone" on YouTube

"Panic Prone" is a song by American rock band Chevelle, released as the third and final single from the band's third album This Type of Thinking (Could Do Us In), and the album's sixth track.

== Background ==
Drummer Sam Loeffler said in an interview, "Panic Prone is an interesting song because I've just recently learned what it's about. Pete was watching television and one of those commercials came on, 'Save the Children' commercials. That song is about making a decision whether you're going to sit on your couch and watch this happen or you're going to stand up and do something about it. That song isn't about if you should or shouldn't do it, it's just about – Are you going to do it? Is this my problem? I was really surprised that it was about that. I think one of the lines is actually about one of our friend's falling off the wagon, too. I think the first line might be about that."

The single peaked at number 26 on the Billboard Mainstream Rock Tracks chart.

== Track listing ==
No.	Title	Length
1.	"Panic Prone"	3:50

== Charts ==
Chart (2007)	Peak position
US Mainstream Rock (Billboard)	26
