= Undead (Hollywood Undead song) =

2008 song by Hollywood Undead

Single by Hollywood Undead

from the album Swan Songs
- Released: August 26, 2008
- Recorded: 2008
- Genre: Rap rock
- Length: 4:25 (album edit); 3:13 (radio edit); 4:36 (promo uncut version)
- Label: Octone
- Songwriters: Bob Daisley; Jorel Decker; Aron Erlichman; Ozzy Osbourne; George Ragan; Randy Rhoads; Jordon Terrell
- Producers: Danny Lohner; Deuce

Hollywood Undead singles chronology
"No. 5" (2008)	"Undead" (2008)	"Christmas in Hollywood" (2008)

Music video
- "Undead" on YouTube

"Undead" is a song by American rap rock band Hollywood Undead. It is the first track and first single from their debut full-length album, Swan Songs. It was released as a single on August 26, 2008, a week before Swan Songs was released.

== Reception ==
The song peaked at #10 on the Hot Mainstream Rock Tracks, #12 on the Hot Modern Rock Tracks, and #4 on the Bubbling Under Hot 100. "Undead" was released as a 7" single in the United Kingdom on HMV with "Circles" as a second track.

During Super Bowl XLIII, a trailer aired for G.I. Joe: The Rise of Cobra which featured "Undead". The song is also featured in the video game UFC 2009 Undisputed from THQ and is part of the soundtrack for Madden NFL 09. MMA fighter Josh Neer used this song as his entrance music during UFC 101. The song was used in the New York Knicks 2009–2010 intro video, and was also used in the NBC telecast of WrestleMania XXV, highlighting the match between The Undertaker and Shawn Michaels. The song was used in a TV spot trailer for the 2011 remake film Conan the Barbarian. The song was also used for Shiima Xion during his run in the indy circuit.

For the 2011–2012 season, the Milwaukee Admirals of the American Hockey League used the song for their pre-game player introductions.

In 2012, Deuce, the former frontman of Hollywood Undead, remixed the song under the title "Nine Lives". This version consists of Deuce performing the original chorus, and Deuce yelling "Nine Lives", rather than "Undead". Deuce also sings over Johnny 3 Tears' verse, making slight changes to some lines. This track was used for a promotional release for Deuce's debut solo album Nine Lives.

== Arrangement ==
The main riff of the song is the same as that from "Crazy Train" by Ozzy Osbourne, played on a synthesizer rather than a guitar and transposed into a different key. As with all songs from the band's debut, Deuce sings the chorus. Johnny 3 Tears prominently screams "Undead!" at the beginning and at the end with the other members, and raps the first and fourth verses. Charlie Scene raps the second verse, and J-Dog raps the third. The uncut version, in which J-Dog disses Jeffree Star, is rapped at live shows, but was cut from Swan Songs. Da Kurlzz screams with Deuce in the chorus, and provides backup shouts on Charlie Scene and J-Dog's verses.

== Personnel ==
Hollywood Undead

- Charlie Scene – lead guitar, vocals
- Da Kurlzz – vocals
- Deuce – bass guitar, engineering, keyboards, programming, vocals
- Funny Man – gang vocals
- J-Dog – keyboards, vocals
- Johnny 3 Tears – vocals

Additional

- Josh Freese – drums
- Ben Grosse – mixing
- Billy Howerdel – additional engineering
- Danny Lohner – engineering, programming

== Charts ==
Chart (2009)	Peak position
Scotland (OCC)	39
UK Singles (OCC)	145
UK Physical Singles (OCC)	34
UK Rock & Metal (OCC)	2
US Bubbling Under Hot 100 (Billboard)	2
US Alternative Airplay (Billboard)	12
US Mainstream Rock (Billboard)	10

== Certifications ==
Region	Certification	Certified units/sales
United Kingdom (BPI)	Silver	200,000^{‡}
United States (RIAA)	2× Platinum	2,000,000^{‡}
^{‡} Sales+streaming figures based on certification alone.
