= I Came to Party =

Single by Deuce featuring Travie McCoy and Truth

from the album Nine Lives
- Released: September 4, 2012
- Recorded: 2011–2012
- Genre: Rap rock; electronic rock
- Length: 15:27
- Label: Five Seven Music
- Songwriters: Andrew Goldstein, Arina Chloe, Aron Erlichman, Jimmy Yuma, Vardan Aslanyan; Travie McCoy
- Producers: Deuce, Andrew Goldstein

Deuce featuring Travie McCoy and Truth singles chronology
"Nobody Likes Me" (2012)	"I Came to Party" (2012)	"The One" (2013)

Music video
- "I Came to Party" (Rock version) on YouTube "I Came to Party" (Album version) on YouTube

I Came to Party is the fifth single by former Hollywood Undead rapper Deuce, it features Travie McCoy and longtime collaborator Truth. The original version of the single is used on Deuce's first solo studio debut album Nine Lives, which was released on September 4, 2012. The single also includes "Rock Mix" version of the song through iTunes on the same day.

== Rock Mix and Release ==
Deuce had announced a "Rock Mix" version of "I Came to Party" on his Twitter account that if you tweet "buy" to his Twitter username "@Deuce9lives", you will have the purchase to the song. Eventually, Deuce released the song as a single to iTunes, which includes both versions of the song and two different music videos.

== Music video ==
The video, directed by Nathan Cox, is based in an empty club in Los Angeles, which Deuce walks into. It was empty until he puts on headphones, which makes a party appear in the room. At the end of the music video, Deuce takes off the headphones and the party disappears before he walks out of the room.

Cox explains the beginning of the video for "I Came to Party", which is the latest single off Deuce’s first studio album Nine Lives. “Deuce has headphones that are magical headphones,” remarks Cox. “When he puts them on, an empty club turns into a crazy club full of people.”

The video features Deuce, Millionaires (group), and also many Deuce fans who were invited via Facebook to arrive at the scene. The video also sees Deuce wearing a new mask; the design of the mask is black base with red like tape that has the word "Danger" somewhat sprayed onto.

== Track listing ==
This track listing is from the official release of the single from iTunes.

No.	Title	Length
1.	"I Came to Party"	3:39
2.	"I Came to Party (Rock Mix)"	3:57
3.	"I Came to Party (Official Version)" (Music Video)	4:03
4.	"I Came to Party" (Music Video)	3:48

== Charts ==
Chart (2012)	Peak position
US Hot Mainstream Rock Tracks (Billboard)	31
