= Mest =

American rock band

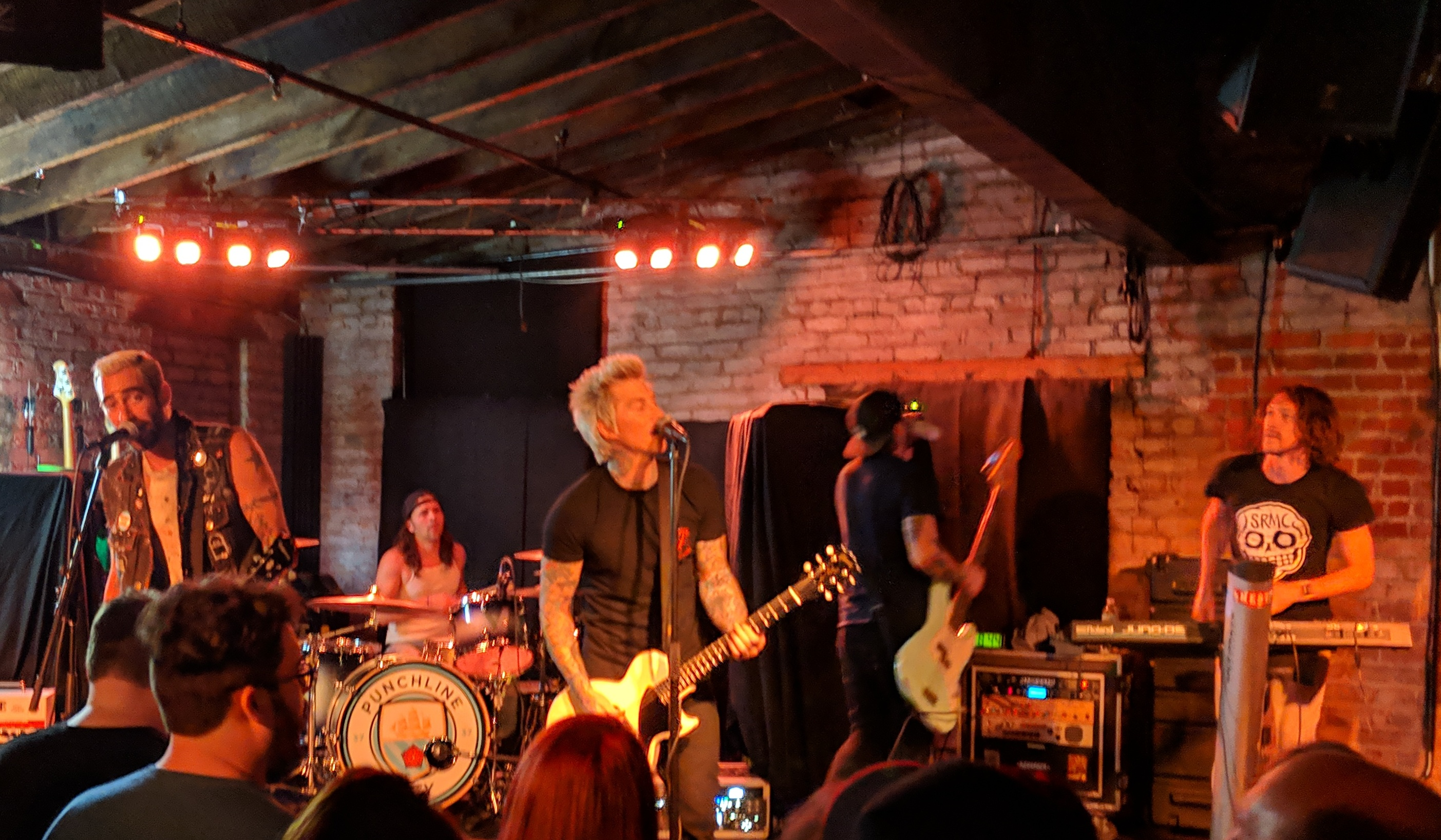
- Mest in 2019

Background information
- Origin: Blue Island, Illinois, U.S.
- Genres: Pop punk; ska punk; alternative rock
- Years active: 1995–2006, 2008–present
- Label: Maverick
- Spinoffs: Kisses For Kings
- Members: Tony Lovato; Gary Foster; Devin Parker
- Past members: Jeremiah Rangel; Steve Lovato; Nick Gigler; Richie Gonzales; Mike Longworth; Brandon Stewart; Adrian Estrella

Mest is an American rock band originally formed by lead vocalist and guitarist Tony Lovato, bassist Matt Lovato, drummer Nick Gigler, and guitarist Jeremiah Rangel. They broke up in 2006 after eleven years, but temporarily reformed in California in 2008 for a "final tour." Tony released “Not What You Expected” in 2013 and it was announced in 2018 that the classic lineup of Mest, with Tony Lovato, Matt Lovato, Nick Gigler, and Jeremiah Rangel, would be getting back together to track Masquerade.

== History ==
Cousins Matt Lovato and Tony Lovato formed the band together in October 1995. The band's last guitarist, Jeremiah Rangel, joined the band in 1998. Their previous guitarist was Steve Lovato, Tony Lovato's brother. Nick Gigler joined the band in 1997.

In 1998, the band self-released Mo' Money, Mo' 40z. Their debut album on Maverick Records, Wasting Time, was released in July 2000 and Destination Unknown in 2001. They toured as an opening band for Goldfinger on July 20, 2002, in Las Vegas and then a few months later, released a DVD called The Show Must Go Off! in January 2003. Later that same year, the band released their self-titled album, which featured the single Jaded (These Years), featuring Benji Madden of Good Charlotte.

In 2005, a tour with Social Distortion was cut short when drummer Nick Gigler required surgery for carpal tunnel syndrome in his wrists which was affecting his drumming. The band's last album, Photographs, was released October 18, 2005.

In January 2006, the band announced on their MySpace blog that they would break-up following a U.S. tour. The tour ran from late January until early March, with support from Allister and Scary Kids Scaring Kids.

Mest played a reunion show at the House of Blues in Anaheim, California, on April 17, 2008. In response, Nick Gigler posted a bulletin through his personal MySpace and confirmed that he would not be taking part, and that he had called Jeremiah Rangel and Matt Lovato, who had confirmed that they would not be appearing with Tony either.

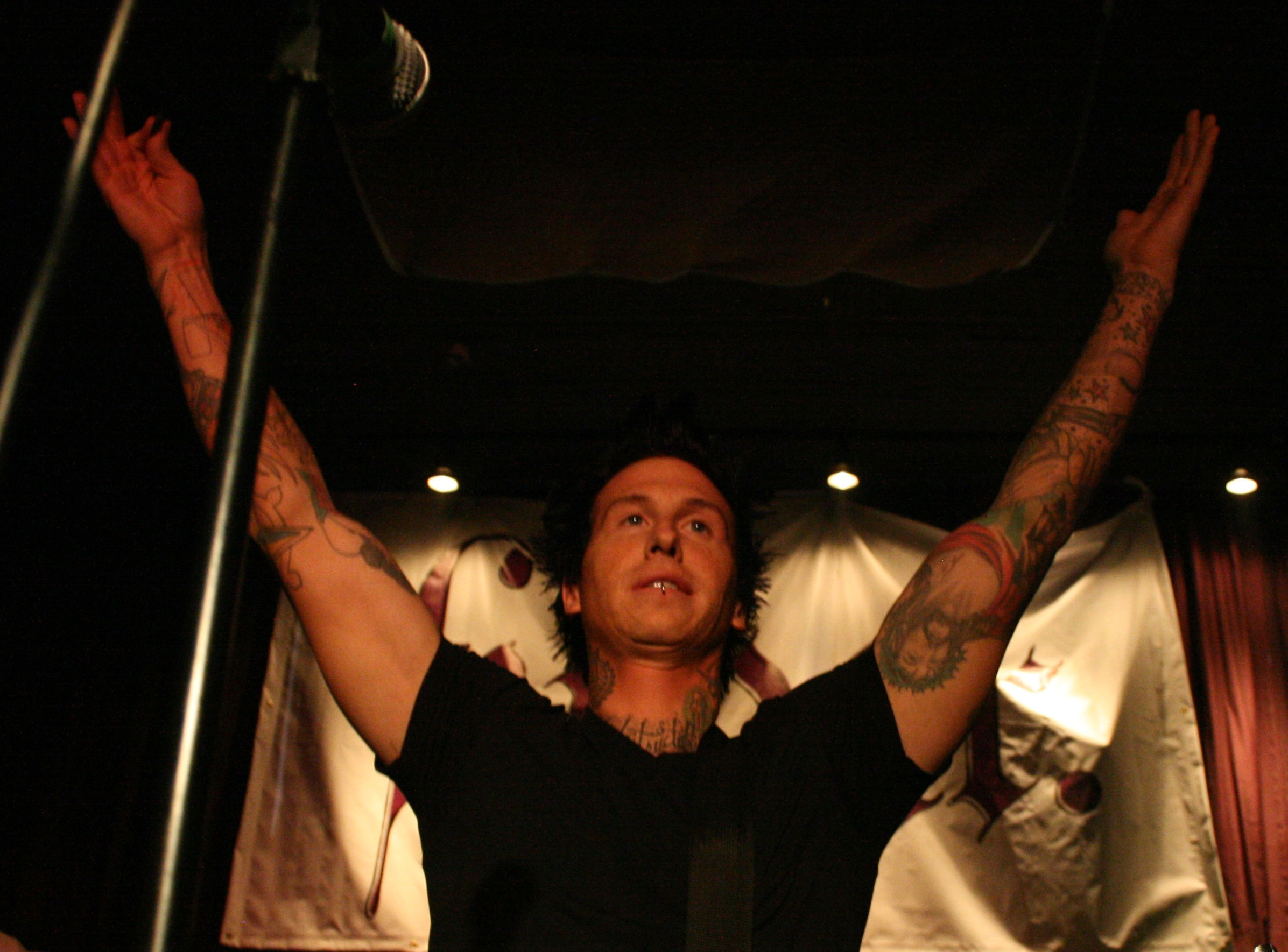
Frontman Tony Lovato in 2009

After the one-off "One Night Stand" show, Tony decided to rebuild Mest and go on a monthlong tour, with help from Chris Wilson (Good Charlotte, The Summer Obsession), and his brother and founding member, Steve Lovato (at the time in Room One Eleven). Although Matt showed interest, he and Jeremiah were both reported to be too busy with other commitments to join. Nick and Tony had not been on speaking terms since the band broke up. The trek took place in October and November 2008, and featured Quietdrive, Rookie of the Year, and Automatic Loveletter.

Mest went on a European tour in spring 2012 with its current members, Mike Longworth and Richie Gonzales, and also toured the US with Escape the Fate and Attack Attack in 2012.

Mest released their album Not What You Expected in September 2013, written and recorded with Richie Gonzales and Mike Longworth, making it available for free to download from their website. Mest played 3 dates on the Warped Tour 2013. They self-released another album in 2014, entitled Broken Down.

On October 25, 2018, Mest officially announced that they had signed with El Hefe, from NOFX's label Cyber Trax Records and a new album with the original lineup would be released in spring 2019. A single entitled "Masquerade" was uploaded to YouTube in July 2019, accompanied by an announcement to the effect that a new album would be released in the fall of that year, produced by Cameron Webb.

Mest's album Masquerade was released on January 17, 2020.

On April 12, 2024, Mest released a new song called "When We Were Young" featuring Jaret Reddick of Bowling For Soup. At this time the band also announced Youth, which released on June 21, 2024.

== Projects ==
=== Room One Eleven ===
Steve Lovato a.k.a. "Locust", went on to assemble a music project called Room One Eleven which includes former Mest lighting engineer and merchandise salesman, Phil Cirullo a.k.a. "Swylla" and hip hop prodigy Damien Ringo. They are a group based out of Chicago's Southside. This band's first album "Tears Dry Slow" was released in early March 2008.

=== Kisses for Kings ===
Tony Lovato went on to form a band called Kisses for Kings, whose line-up consists of Tony Lovato, Mike Longworth, and Richie Gonzales. They have performed on the 2007 Warped Tour and toured in July 2009 with Hollywood Undead, Red Jumpsuit Apparatus and The Sleeping on the "Taking Care of Business Tour" a.k.a. TCB Tour. Their first EP was released on May 1, 2010, at the MEST show at the House of Blues, Anaheim.

=== The Twilight and the Sound ===
Matt and Jeremiah formed a new band called The Twilight and the Sound, announced publicly via Mest's MySpace page on Monday, October 27, 2008.

=== London Falling ===
Tony Lovato's second project after Mest, they released an EP and their single “Nightmare”, The single also features Ronnie Ficarro ex-bassist of Falling In Reverse.

=== The Get Go ===
Nick Gigler's first project after Mest was Chicago-based The Get Go. The band was formed in January 2007, and also features members such as Allister's Scott Murphy on bass and vocals and Kyle Lewis on guitar and vocals, Showoff's Chris Messer on vocals and Nate Thruman on guitar and vocals.

=== The A-Gang ===
The A-Gang is a current project involving Nick Gigler on drums. Based in Detroit, it also features former Suicide Machines bassist Rich Tschirhart.

== Members ==
Current

- Tony Lovato – lead vocals, rhythm guitar (1995–present)
- Gary Foster - drums (2020–present)
- Bob Amendola - bass (2023–present)
- Devin Parker - lead guitar (2023–present)

Former

- Casey Artus - bass (2020–2023)
- Matt Lovato – bass (1995–2006, 2015–2020)
- Nick Gigler – drums (1995–2006, 2015–2020)
- Jeremiah Rangel – lead guitar, backing and lead vocals (1998–2006, 2015–2020)
- Chris Wilson – drums (2008)
- Steve Lovato – guitar, bass (1995–1998, 2008–2012)
- Richie Gonzales – drums (2010–2015)
- Mike Longworth – lead guitar, studio bass (2010–2015)
- Brandon Stewart – bass (2013–2015)

Timeline

== Discography ==
=== Studio albums ===
Year	Album	Peak chart positions		Record company
Year	Album	US	US Heat	Record company
1998	Mo' Money, Mo' 40z	—	—	Self-released
2000	Wasting Time	—	—	Maverick
2001	Destination Unknown	—	12	Maverick
2003	Mest	64	—	Maverick
2005	Photographs	116	—	Maverick
2013	Not What You Expected	—	—	Daiki Sound
2020	Masquerade	—	—	Dead End Records

=== EPs ===
Year	Album	Record company
2024	Youth	Dead End Records

=== Independent albums ===
Year	Album	Record company
1996	DAT, DAT! UH OH	Self-released

=== Acoustic albums ===
Year	Album	Record company
2014	Broken Down	Self-released
2017	Broken Down 2	Self-released

=== Singles ===
- "Drawing Board" from Wasting Time
- "Cadillac" from Destination Unknown
- "Mother's Prayer" from Destination Unknown
- "Jaded (These Years)" from Mest – No. 88 Australia
- "Rooftops" from Mest
- "Take Me Away (Cried Out to Heaven)" from Photographs
- "Kiss Me, Kill Me" from Photographs
- "Almost" from Not What You Expected
- "Radio (Something To Believe)" from Not What You Expected
- "Masquerade" from Masquerade
- "The Upside Down" from Masquerade
- "I Am Right Here" from Masquerade
- "Dead End Street" from Masquerade
- "Don't Worry Son" from Masquerade
- "When We Were Young (ft. Jaret Reddick of Bowling for Soup)" from Youth
- "Hate You Sober (ft. Spencer Charnas of Ice Nine Kills)" from Youth

=== Music videos ===
Year	Song	Director
2000	"What's the Dillio?"	Nathan Cox
2001	"Cadillac"	Marcos Siega
2003	"Jaded (These Years)"	Steven Murashige
2005	"Take Me Away (Cried Out to Heaven)"	Brian Lazzaro
2012	"Almost"	Jeff Janke
2013	"Radio (Something to Believe)"	Jeff Janke
2024	"When We Were Young (Ft. Jaret Reddick)"	Alex Ochoa

== Videography appearances ==
- The Show Must Go Off! (2003) DVD
- Vans Warped Tour (2003) DVD
- Seven Deadly Sins (2005) DVD
