= Letter from a Thief =

Single by Chevelle

from the album Sci-Fi Crimes
- Released: December 7, 2009
- Length: 3:27
- Label: Epic
- Songwriters: Pete Loeffler; Sam Loeffler
- Producer: Brian Virtue

Chevelle singles chronology
"Jars" (2009)	"Letter from a Thief" (2009)	"Shameful Metaphors" (2010)

Music video
- "Letter from a Thief" on YouTube

"Letter from a Thief" is a song by American rock band Chevelle. The song serves the second single from the band's album, Sci-Fi Crimes. It was released on December 7, 2009. Chevelle originally debuted this track on April 9, 2009, at a concert in Atlanta. Frontman Pete Loeffler said the song is about a personal experience for the band when their gear was stolen in Dallas, and his prized red PRS guitar seen in the video for "Send the Pain Below" was stolen, along with the rest of the band's gear, and returned by a man in California who returned the guitar to PRS after learning it was Loeffler's.

== Critical reception ==
Loudwire ranked it the eighth greatest Chevelle song.

== Music video ==
Mobile videos of the band recording "Letter from a Thief" were posted on the band's website on November 30, 2009.

On December 18, 2009, the music video premiered. It shows the band members performing the song in an otherwise empty room.

== Charts ==
=== Weekly charts ===
Chart (2009–2010)	Peak position
Canada Rock (Billboard)	41
US Hot Rock & Alternative Songs (Billboard)	4

=== Year-end charts ===
Chart (2010)	Position
US Hot Rock & Alternative Songs (Billboard)	23
