= Not What You Expected =

Studio album by Mest
- Released: September 25, 2013
- Genre: Pop punk, punk rock
- Label: Wave Master (Japan); self-released (USA)

Mest chronology
Photographs (2005)	Not What You Expected (2013)	Broken Down (2014)

Singles from Not What You Expected
- 1. "Almost" Released: February 14, 2012; 2. "Radio (Something to Believe)" Released: June 4, 2013

Not What You Expected is the sixth studio album from American pop punk band Mest, their first album in eight years with only vocalist Tony Lovato returning. Originally slated for released in April 2012, the album was continuously pushed back until September 24, 2013. A week before the release, the band announced via their official Facebook account and website that they would be giving the album away for free, one song per week, through their official website. However, internationally in Japan, the album was released in full.

== Singles ==
The album's first single, "Almost", which had an accompanying music video, was released on February 14, 2012. The second single, "Radio (Something to Believe)," was released over a year later on June 4, 2013, which has also been made into a music video. Although not an official single, "One Life," was released for free during the summer of 2012 to hold fans over until the official release.

== Track listing ==
1. "Radio (Something to Believe)" (featuring Jeremy McKinnon) - 4:55
2. "Goodbyes" - 3:31
3. "Almost" - 3:28
4. "One Life" - 3:36
5. "M.D.M.A." - 5:17
6. "The Past" - 3:19
7. "Not This Again" - 3:55
8. "Can't Let Go" - 3:01
9. "Day Turns Tonight" - 3:46
10. "Good Die Young" - 3:59
11. "Blinded Bye"
