= I Get It =

Single by Chevelle

from the album Vena Sera
- Released: June 12, 2007
- Length: 3:55
- Label: Epic
- Songwriters: Pete Loeffler; Sam Loeffler
- Producer: Michael "Elvis" Baskette

Chevelle singles chronology
"Well Enough Alone" (2007)	"I Get It" (2007)	"The Fad" (2008)

Music video
- "I Get It" on YouTube

"I Get It" is a song by American rock band Chevelle. It was released as the second single from their fourth studio album, Vena Sera (2007). The song was announced on the band's website to be released to radio stations on June 12, 2007.

== Critical reception ==
Loudwire ranked it the fifth greatest Chevelle song.

== Music video ==
The music video for "I Get It" premiered on November 28 on MTV2 at the top of every hour they played music videos.

The video marks the first time since the band's video for "Mia" in 1999 that the band did not appear in its music video. The video was directed by Shawn Foster under the team name Citizens of Tomorrow. The concept was written by Jeff Hilliard.

The video features a man at his job (Jeff Hilliard). He is frequently picked on by his employer (Paul Hughes). He plans an elaborate scheme to get back at his boss, including dressing up as a clown, taking pictures of his boss cheating on his wife, having a mixed martial artist (played by Josh Koscheck) attack his boss, and tattooing "Mr. Perfect" into his boss's head.

The video features two comedians and fellow friends of the band, Jeff Hilliard and Paul Hughes. They play the video's main protagonist and antagonist, respectively.

== Charts ==
=== Weekly charts ===
Weekly chart performance for "I Get It"
Chart (2007–2008)	Peak position
Canada Rock (Billboard)	31
US Bubbling Under Hot 100 (Billboard)	18
US Alternative Airplay (Billboard)	4
US Mainstream Rock (Billboard)	5

=== Year-end charts ===
2007 year-end chart performance for "I Get It"
Chart (2007)	Position
US Mainstream Rock Songs (Billboard)	14

2008 year-end chart performance for "I Get It"
Chart (2008)	Position
US Alternative Airplay (Billboard)	20

== Certifications ==
Region	Certification	Certified units/sales
United States (RIAA)	Gold	500,000^{‡}
^{‡} Sales+streaming figures based on certification alone.
