= Vena Sera =

Studio album by Chevelle
- Released: April 3, 2007
- Studios: Studio at the Palms (Las Vegas, Nevada); Studio Barbarosa (Bavon, Virginia)
- Genres: Alternative metal; hard rock; post-grunge
- Length: 44:09
- Label: Epic
- Producer: Michael "Elvis" Baskette

Chevelle chronology
This Type of Thinking (Could Do Us In) (2004)	Vena Sera (2007)	Sci-Fi Crimes (2009)

Singles from Vena Sera
- 1. "Well Enough Alone" Released: February 13, 2007; 2. "I Get It" Released: June 12, 2007; 3. "The Fad" Released: February 11, 2008

Vena Sera is the fourth studio album by the American rock band Chevelle, released on April 3, 2007, through Epic Records. Many of the tracks on this album were based on material from unreleased songs the band had previously recorded. The term "Vena Sera" is ungrammatical Latin for "vein liquids" or "it's too late".

Vena Sera is the first Chevelle album with bassist Dean Bernardini, the brother-in-law of fellow members Pete and Sam Loeffler. It would also be the second and final album produced by Michael "Elvis" Baskette, marking the first time Chevelle maintained the same producer for a second record.

The first single, "Well Enough Alone", was released to radio stations on February 13, 2007, but a CD single would not be available until March 6.

The album debuted at number 12 in the United States with sales of approximately 62,000 copies sold. This was less than their previous album, This Type of Thinking (Could Do Us In). On May 28, 2020, it was certified gold by the RIAA with sales of over 500,000 units sold.

== Composition ==
Vena Sera's genre has been described as alternative metal, hard rock, and post-grunge. The working title for "Saturdays" was "Saturdays of Our Youth".

== Reception ==
Professional ratings
Review scores
Source	Rating
AbsolutePunk	72%
AllMusic	3/5 stars
Blabbermouth.net	6.5/10
Entertainment Weekly	C
Melodic	4/5 stars
MetalSucks	2/5 stars
Rolling Stone	2/5 stars
TuneLab Music	9/10
Type 3 Media	8.5/10

According to Blake Solomon of AbsolutePunk, "Vena Sera will not stun anyone with its creative approach to rock or metal or alternative music (depending which song you hear or who you ask). But what the album will do is have you coming back more than a few times to engulf yourself in the heavy riffs and manly baritone of Pete Loeffler." Corey Apar writing for AllMusic called the album "good enough, but too much of it simply sounds like rewrites of songs from the band's past." Blabbermouth.net felt that the album "is a showcase for this band's tight, punchy sound, Peter Loeffler's fluid vocals...even if the tunes don't have the staying power of truly great rock music."

Michael Endelman of Entertainment Weekly stated that the album "begins to bore" because of the band's "reliance on a formula — chugging intro, choppy verses, clouds-parting choruses." Johan Wippsson of Melodic described the album as "[the band's] best album so far with a little cleaner and more varied sound." According to Vince Neilstein of MetalSucks, "There are a couple of solid tunes here, but... [the] album... mostly blends together from song to song." Sputnikmusic felt that the album was "[a] significant step in the right direction" and praised the addition of Dean Bernardini on bass, stating that "[he] breathes an astonishing amount of life into...the rhythm section."

== Track listing ==
All tracks are written by Lyrics: Peter Loeffler, Music: Chevelle (BMI songwriter listing: Peter Loeffler, Samuel Loeffler) except "Delivery" by Compulsion.

No.	Title	Length
1.	"Antisaint"	4:21
2.	"Brainiac"	3:21
3.	"Saferwaters"	4:11
4.	"Well Enough Alone"	4:18
5.	"Straight Jacket Fashion"	4:02
6.	"The Fad"	3:37
7.	"Humanoid"	3:58
8.	"Paint the Seconds"	3:58
9.	"Midnight to Midnight"	4:24
10.	"I Get It"	3:55
11.	"Saturdays"	4:04
Total length:		44:09

Digital bonus track
No.	Title	Length
12.	"In Debt to the Earth"	4:12
Total length:		48:20

Best Buy bonus tracks
No.	Title	Length
12.	"Sleep Walking Elite"	3:40
13.	"Delivery" (Compulsion cover)	3:03
Total length:		50:51

== Personnel ==
Chevelle

- Pete Loeffler – guitars, vocals
- Sam Loeffler – drums
- Dean Bernardini – bass, drums

Production

- Michael "Elvis" Baskette – producer, mixing
- Ted Jensen – mastering
- Dave Holdredge – engineer
- Jef Moll – digital editing and programming (tracks 1–11); co-producer, engineer, editor and mixing (on bonus tracks)

== Charts ==
Chart (2007)	Peak position	Ref.
Billboard 200	12	
Billboard Top Rock Albums	2	
Billboard Top Tastemaker Albums	10	

== Certifications ==
Region	Certification	Certified units/sales
United States (RIAA)	Gold	500,000^{‡}
^{‡} Sales+streaming figures based on certification alone.
