= Swan Songs B-Sides =

EP by Hollywood Undead
- Released: June 23, 2009
- Recorded: 2008
- Genre: Rap rock
- Label: A&M/Octone
- Producer: Don Gilmore, Danny Lohner

Hollywood Undead non-studio album chronology
Swan Songs (2008)	Swan Songs B-Sides (2009)	Desperate Measures (2009)

Swan Songs B-Sides is the first EP by American rap rock band Hollywood Undead. It was released on June 23, 2009, and consists of four B-side tracks that were recorded during the sessions of the album Swan Songs but didn't make the final cut.

These four tracks were previously available as bonus tracks on different editions of the album. "The Loss" was released on the Indie Store edition of the album, and "The Natives" was released on the Smartpunk edition, while both "Pain" and "Knife Called Lust" were released on the UK and Japanese editions of the album; "Pain" was also available on the iTunes edition.

The EP was later released on physical 7" as part of Record Store Day 2009.

== Track listing ==
No.	Title	Writer(s)	Length
1.	"Pain"	Aron Erlichman, George Ragan, Jordon Terrell	2:41
2.	"The Natives"	Alvarez, Decker, Erlichman, Jeffrey Phillips, Ragan, Matthew Busek, Terrell	3:40
3.	"Knife Called Lust"	Decker, Erlichman, Phillips, Terrell	2:59
4.	"The Loss"	Decker, Erlichman, Busek	3:15

== Personnel ==
=== Hollywood Undead ===
- Aron "Deuce" Erlichman – vocals, bass guitar, keyboards
- Jordon "Charlie Scene" Terrell – vocals, lead guitar
- Jorel "J-Dog" Decker – vocals, rhythm guitar, bass guitar, keyboards, synthesizers, programming
- George "Johnny 3 Tears" Ragan – vocals (all tracks)
- Dylan "Funny Man" Alvarez – vocals
- Matthew "Da Kurlzz" Busek – vocals, drums, percussion
- Jeffrey "Shady Jeff" Phillips – vocals (2, 3), programming (2, 3)

=== Additional personnel ===
- Danny Lohner – production, mixing, mastering

== Charts ==
Chart (2009)	Peak position
US Billboard 200	124
US Top Hard Rock Albums (Billboard)	20
US Top Rock Albums (Billboard)	50
