= Everywhere I Go (Hollywood Undead song) =

Single by Hollywood Undead

from the album Swan Songs
- Released: 2007
- Recorded: January–May 2007
- Studio: A&M Records
- Genre: Rap rock
- Length: 3:29
- Label: Octone; Polydor
- Songwriters: Aron Erlichman; Jordon Terrell
- Producers: Danny Lohner, Don Gilmore

Hollywood Undead singles chronology
"Everywhere I Go" (2007)	"Black Dahlia" (2010)

Music video
- "Everywhere I Go" on YouTube

"Everywhere I Go" is a song by American rap rock band Hollywood Undead. It was released as the fifth single and the third track off their debut studio album Swan Songs.

== Composition and lyrics ==
This song contains explicit lyrics about partying with sexual themes and is one of the band's party/dance oriented songs. The song was met with mixed reviews, some calling it a fun party track while others criticized its poor lyrics. All of the verses are rapped by member Charlie Scene, whilst the choruses are sung by former member Deuce. Background vocals are performed by Da Kurlzz.

== Music video ==
The music video was released on January 12, 2010 and was directed by member Charlie Scene. The video follows Charlie Scene to a party with the rest of the band doing typical "gangster" acts, dancing with women and general partying.

== Charts ==
Chart (2009)	Peak position
US Alternative Songs (Billboard)	38

== Personnel ==
Hollywood Undead

- Charlie Scene – guitars, lead vocals
- Da Kurlzz – backing vocals, drums, percussion
- Deuce – bass, clean vocals, keyboards
- J-Dog – keyboards

Additional

- Ben Grosse – mixing
- Mark Kiczula – engineering
- Fox Phelps – assistant programming
- B.C. Smith – programming
- Don Gillmore – production

== Certifications ==
Region	Certification	Certified units/sales
New Zealand (RMNZ)	Gold	15,000^{‡}
United Kingdom (BPI)	Silver	200,000^{‡}
United States (RIAA)	2× Platinum	2,000,000^{‡}
^{‡} Sales+streaming figures based on certification alone.
