= Young (Hollywood Undead song) =

Single by Hollywood Undead

from the album Swan Songs
- Released: April 13, 2009
- Recorded: January–May 2008
- Genre: Nu metal
- Length: 3:16
- Label: A&M Octone
- Songwriters: Aron Erlichman; Danny Lohner; George Ragan
- Producers: Don Gilmore; Danny Lohner; Deuce

Hollywood Undead singles chronology
"Christmas in Hollywood" (2008)	"Young" (2009)	"This Love, This Hate" (2009)

Music video
- "Young" on YouTube

"Young" is a song by American rap rock band Hollywood Undead. It is the fourth single from their debut studio album, Swan Songs, and is the sixth track on that album. The single was released after the album's release on April 13, 2009, with a music video directed by Kevin Kerslake released the same day.

== Background ==
Following the release of their debut album, Swan Songs, in 2008, the album became certified gold by the RIAA and led to the release of five singles. The fourth was Young, which was released as a single on April 13, 2009, six months after the United States release of Swan Songs but a month before the worldwide release. Prior to the single's release, several seven-second teaser videos of the music video were released on the internet. The full music video, directed by Kevin Kerslake, was released on the same day as the single.

The song was included as one of 20 free songs downloadable to play for people who purchased new copies of Rock Band 2.

The song was also used in the trailer for the Xbox 360 and PC video game Velvet Assassin

== Music video ==
On April 13, 2009, an official music video directed by Kevin Kerslake was released on iTunes. The video was later posted on the band's official website for viewing. The music video shows clips of Los Angeles and the band performing. The band is shown playing in a narrow hallway with no doors or windows, only photographs on all four walls. The photos show fans and others wearing their own homemade rendition of the Hollywood Undead masks. Quick cuts and fast moving camera shots are used while the band is performing around the hall. Johnny Three Tears raps both the first and second verses of the song with Deuce singing the chorus. A breakdown is placed after the second verse where choir girls sing angelic lines while the band raps between them.

In the parts that the band isn't performing, clips of various people and places are shown. The video begins with a distorted clip of an older man giving a speech over a classical piano tune. The man is shown behind of a pedestal with a phonograph microphone in front of three banners showing pictures of a grenade, a symbol for war. The image presented can be likened to World War II era videos of Adolf Hitler delivering oppressive speeches in front of the swaztika, to which the grenade flag itself strikingly resembles. The video progresses to show subliminal imaging of advertising and hate campaigns blaming youth for various things. Later in the video, images of doves are shown to be spray painted over the advertising in a rebellious fashion. The dove is the second part to the Hollywood Undead's symbol, "The Dove and Grenade", with the grenade standing for war and the dove for peace. The video pinnacles when all the images of fan's masks are shown in close up on the wall and fades out to the band ripping them all down and breaking free of the room. The video ends with Johnny 3 Tears forcibly removing the speech giver from the beginning of the video from his pedestal and he takes his place.

== Reception ==
=== Critical ===
A review for Swan Songs by Brian Rademacher called "Young" "The track that will shoot Hollywood Undead to superstar status." Rademacher commented on the track, saying, "It is aggressive yet has chart busting qualities and the addition of two young choir girls makes this song have class. Near the end of the track, you have the two girls singing 'Till the angels save us all' and that sent chills down my neck." A reviewer for New Music Reviews called the track "Hard rock music at It's [sic] finest", and scored it a positive eight out of ten. Not all reviews were as positive, however. Palmer Eldritch of the British online music magazine, Die Shellsuit, Die!, gave the song a one out of a possible ten, calling it "airbrushed nonsense."

=== Commercial ===
The single reached a peak of number thirty-four on the Billboard Alternative Songs chart, spending eleven total weeks on the chart starting April 25, 2009.

== Charts ==
Chart (2010–2011)	Peak position
US Alternative Songs (Billboard)	34

== Track listing ==
Single
No.	Title	Length
1.	"Young"	3:16

DJ CD (promotional release)
No.	Title	Length
1.	"Young"	3:16
2.	"Young" (new mix)	3:15

== Personnel ==
Hollywood Undead

- Charlie Scene – background vocals, lead guitar
- Da Kurlzz – background vocals, percussion
- Deuce – bass guitar, engineering, keyboards, programming, vocals
- J-Dog – background vocals, keyboards
- Johnny 3 Tears – vocals

Additional

- Josh Freese – drums
- Ben Grosse – mixing
- Billy Howerdel – additional engineering
- Danny Lohner – engineering, programming
- Paul Palavo – additional guitars

== Certifications ==
Region	Certification	Certified units/sales
United States (RIAA)	Gold	500,000^{‡}
^{‡} Sales+streaming figures based on certification alone.
