= The River (Live song) =

Single by Live

from the album Songs from Black Mountain
- Released: March 21, 2006
- Genre: Alternative rock
- Length: 2:59
- Label: Radioactive Records
- Songwriter: Ed Kowalczyk
- Producer: Jim Wirt

Live singles chronology
"We Deal in Dreams" (2004)	"The River" (2006)	"Mystery" (2006)

"The River" is a song by the American rock band Live, which was released as the first single from their eighth studio album, Songs from Black Mountain.

The song was not released as a commercially purchasable single in the United States and failed to chart on Billboard's Hot 100 Airplay chart, but peaked at #33 on the Billboard Hot Adult Top 40 Tracks chart.

== Track listings ==
=== Australian and European CD singles ===
1. "The River" (Radio Edit) – 3:00
2. "The River" (Acoustic Version) – 2:58
3. "Get Ready" (Acoustic Version) – 2:58

=== European CD single 2 ===
1. "The River" – 3:00
2. "The River" (Video)

== Charts ==
=== Weekly charts ===
Chart (2006)	Peak position
Australia (ARIA)	33
Belgium (Ultratop 50 Flanders)	49
Netherlands (Dutch Top 40)	19
Netherlands (Single Top 100)	15
US Adult Pop Airplay (Billboard)	33

=== Year-end charts ===
Chart (2006)	Position
Netherlands (Dutch Top 40)	91
