= Swan Songs (Hollywood Undead album) =

Studio album by Hollywood Undead
- Released: September 2, 2008
- Recorded: July 2005 – May 2008
- Studios: Hammer & Sickle Studios, Hollywood, California; Castle Renholdër, Laurel Canyon, California; Perfect Circle Studios, Hollywood, California; NRG Studios, North Hollywood, California
- Genres: Rap rock; nu metal
- Length: 49:35
- Labels: A&M Octone; Polydor
- Producers: Don Gilmore; Danny Lohner; Jimmy Yuma; Deuce (exec.)

Hollywood Undead studio album chronology
Swan Songs (2008)	American Tragedy (2011)

Singles from Swan Songs
- 1. "No. 5" Released: March 18, 2007; 2. "Undead" Released: August 26, 2008; 3. "Young" Released: April 13, 2009; 4. "This Love, This Hate" Released: Late 2009; 5. "Everywhere I Go" Released: July 29, 2009; 6. "Black Dahlia" Released: September 13, 2010

Swan Songs is the debut studio album by American rap rock band Hollywood Undead. It was released through Octone Records and Polydor Records on September 2, 2008. "Everywhere I Go" was the first single to be released, it was a web single and was available for download only on iTunes. The band released four music videos for four songs on the album, "No. 5", "Undead", "Young", and "Everywhere I Go". When purchased through Amazon.com and at some other retailers, the album includes a bonus track and an option to unlock music videos. It is their only album to feature Deuce as a member of Hollywood Undead, as he departed the band in 2009 due to creative differences.

== Background ==
Swan Songs was supposed to be released on the band's original label, MySpace Records in 2007, however it was postponed by the record label when they requested to have some of the songs removed and others censored. The band declined and switched labels to Octone which would not require them to censor their songs. The song "Undead" is featured in the video games UFC Undisputed 2009 and Madden NFL 09. The song "Young" is featured as downloadable content for Rock Band 2.

== Music and lyrics ==
Some of the album's material has been described as "ironic frat-boy party rap" by AllMusic. The vocals have drawn comparisons to Marshall Mathers. "Funny Man" sings in the baritone range. The album's lyrics contain pejoratives considered to be misogynist and homophobic.

== Critical reception ==
Professional ratings
Review scores
Source	Rating
AllMusic	2/5 stars
God Is in the TV	0/5 stars
Rock Sound	7/10 stars
Ultimate Guitar	6.2/10 stars

Swan Songs received mostly mixed reviews. Dave Donnelly of AllMusic gave the album a 2 out of 5 stars, saying that the lyrics were uninteresting and that the album was "given over to ironic frat-boy party rap" (using the singles "Everywhere I Go" and "No. 5" as examples).

== Commercial performance ==
The album debuted at number 22 on the US Billboard 200 selling 21,000 copies in its first week.

== Track listing ==
All tracks are written and performed by Hollywood Undead, with specific writers detailed for each track.

Standard Edition
No.	Title	Writer(s)	Producer(s)	Length
1.	"Undead"	Matthew Busek; Jorel Decker; George Ragan; Aron Erlichman; Jordon Terrell	Erlichman; Danny Lohner	4:25
2.	"Sell Your Soul"	Erlichman; Decker; Ragan; Lohner	Erlichman; Lohner	3:14
3.	"Everywhere I Go"	Erlichman; Terrell	Don Gilmore	3:30
4.	"No Other Place"	Erlichman; Dylan Alvarez	Erlichman	3:16
5.	"No. 5"	Erlichman; Alvarez; Matthew Busek; Ragan; Terrell	Erlichman	3:05
6.	"Young"	Erlichman; Lohner; Ragan	Lohner	3:16
7.	"Black Dahlia"	Erlichman; Decker; Ragan	Erlichman	3:46
8.	"This Love, This Hate"	Erlichman; Jimmy Yuma	Erlichman	3:57
9.	"Bottle and a Gun"	Alvarez; Erlichman; Terrell	Erlichman	3:22
10.	"California"	Erlichman; Decker; Ragan	Gilmore	3:17
11.	"City"	Erlichman; Ragan; Terrell	Erlichman; Lohner	3:34
12.	"The Diary"	Erlichman; Ragan	Erlichman	4:35
13.	"Pimpin'"	Erlichman; Decker; Ragan; Terrell	Erlichman	3:07
14.	"Paradise Lost"	Erlichman; Gilmore; Ragan	Gilmore	3:11
Total length:				49:35

Japanese and UK Bonus Tracks
No.	Title	Writer(s)	Producer(s)	Length
15.	"Pain"	Erlichman; Ragan; Terrell	Erlichman	2:41
16.	"Knife Called Lust"	Erlichman; Decker; Jeffrey Phillips; Terrell	Erlichman	2:59
Total length:				54:35

Indie Store Bonus Track
No.	Title	Writer(s)	Length
15.	"The Loss"	Busek; Decker	3:15
Total length:			52:50

Smartpunk Bonus Track
No.	Title	Writer(s)	Length
15.	"The Natives"	Alvarez; Busek; Decker; Ragan; Terrell	3:40
Total length:			53:15

iTunes Bonus Track
No.	Title	Writer(s)	Producer(s)	Length
15.	"Pain"	Erlichman; Ragan; Terrell	Erlichman	2:41
Total length:				52:16

Collector's Edition Bonus Tracks
No.	Title	Writer(s)	Producer(s)	Length
15.	"Pain" (Swan Songs B-Sides)	Erlichman; Ragan; Terrell	Erlichman	2:41
16.	"The Natives" (Swan Songs B-Sides)	Alvarez; Busek; Decker; Ragan; Terrell		3:40
17.	"Knife Called Lust" (Swan Songs B-Sides)	Busek; Decker; Jeffrey Phillips; Terrell	Erlichman	2:59
18.	"The Loss" (Swan Songs B-Sides)	Busek; Decker		3:15
19.	"Bitches" (Swan Songs Rarities)	Alvarez; Busek; Decker; Ragan; Terrell		3:30
20.	"The Kids" (Swan Songs Rarities)	Decker; Erlichman; Phillips		3:01
21.	"Circles" (Swan Songs Rarities)	Erlichman; Ragan		3:33
22.	"Black Dahlia" (Buffalo Bill remix)	Decker; Ragan		3:50
23.	"Black Dahlia" (Lo Fidelity Allstars remix)	Decker; Ragan		4:32
24.	"Black Dahlia" (The Pharmacy remix)	Decker; Ragan		3:46
Total length:				84:27

== Personnel ==
Credits for Swan Songs adapted from Allmusic.

Hollywood Undead

- Aron "Deuce" Erlichman – lead vocals, bass guitar, keyboards, executive production, engineering (tracks: 1–2, 4–9 and 11–13, bonus tracks 15–21), programming (tracks: 1–2, 4–9 and 11–13, bonus tracks 15–21), mixing (track: 13, bonus tracks 15–21), guitar (track 8)
- Jordon "Charlie Scene" Terrell – vocals (tracks: 1, 3–5, 7, 9–11, and 13, bonus tracks 15–19), guitars (on all tracks except on track 8)
- Jorel "J-Dog" Decker – vocals (tracks: 1–2, 5–7, and 9–11, bonus tracks 16–20), keyboards (tracks: 1, 6–7, and 11, bonus track 20)
- George "Johnny 3 Tears" Ragan – vocals (tracks: 1–2, 5–7, and 9–14, bonus tracks 15–16, 18–19, and 21)
- Dylan "Funny Man" Alvarez – vocals (tracks: 1, 4–5, 9, and 13, bonus tracks 16 and 19)
- Matthew "Da Kurlzz" Busek – vocals (tracks: 1–3, 5–6, and 9–11, bonus tracks 16–17 and 19), drums (tracks: 5, 7, 9, and 11, bonus tracks 16–19), percussion (tracks: 5, 7, 9, and 11, bonus tracks 16–19)
- Jeffrey "Shady Jeff" Phillips – vocals (bonus tracks 17 and 20)

Additional musicians

- Josh Freese – drums (tracks: 1, 6 and 11)
- Danny Lohner – guitars (tracks: 2, 8 and 14), engineering, production
- Paul Pavao – guitar (track 6)
- Dean Saenz – drums (track 2)
- John Tempesta – drums (track 14)

Production

- Don Gilmore – production
- Billy Howerdel – engineering
- Mark Kiczula – assistant
- Ben Grosse – mixing
- Dave McNair – mastering
- Jonas Åkerlund – art direction, photography
- Jason Goad – illustrations
- Fox Phelps – assistant
- Jimmy Yuma – assistant, production

== Charts ==
=== Weekly charts ===
2008–2009 weekly chart performance for Swan Songs
Chart (2008–2009)	Peak position
Dutch Albums (Album Top 100)	90
Scottish Albums (Official Charts)	99
UK Albums (Official Charts)	85
US Billboard 200	22
US Top Alternative Albums (Billboard)	5
US Top Hard Rock Albums (Billboard)	3
US Top Rock Albums (Billboard)	8

2011 weekly chart performance for Swan Songs
Chart (2011)	Peak position
US Top Catalog Albums (Billboard)	13

=== Year-end charts ===
Year-end chart performance for Swan Songs
Chart (2009)	Position
US Billboard 200	66
US Top Rock Albums (Billboard)	21

== Certifications ==
Certifications for Swan Songs
Region	Certification	Certified units/sales
Canada (Music Canada)	Platinum	80,000^{‡}
United Kingdom (BPI)	Silver	60,000^{‡}
United States (RIAA)	Platinum	1,000,000^{‡}
^{‡} Sales+streaming figures based on certification alone.

== Release history ==
Release dates and formats for Swan Songs
Region	Date	Label	Format	Catalog	Ref
United States	September 2, 2008	A&M/Octone	CD, Digital download	001133102	
United States	September 2, 2008	A&M/Octone	CD with Bonus Tracks	001199002	
Japan	May 6, 2009	A&M/Octone	CD, Digital download	B001133102	
Europe	May 18, 2009	Polydor Group	CD, Digital download	B002436WEE	
Germany	July 31, 2009	A&M/Octone	CD, Digital download		
European Union	December 1, 2009	Polydor Group	Vinyl	B002M81UA2	
United States	May 11, 2018	A&M/Octone	Vinyl	B0027938-01	
