= Photographs (Mest album) =

Studio album by Mest
- Released: October 18, 2005
- Genre: Pop punk, alternative rock
- Length: 43:06
- Label: Maverick
- Producer: John Feldmann

Mest chronology
Mest (2003)	Photographs (2005)	Not What You Expected (2013)

Singles from Photographs
- 1. "Kiss Me, Kill Me" Released: September 6, 2005; 2. "Take me Away (Cried Out to Heaven)" Released: September 13, 2005

Professional ratings
Review scores
Source	Rating
Allmusic	2/5 stars
Melodic	3/5 stars

Photographs is the fifth studio album by American pop punk band Mest.

== Release ==
On July 12, 2005, Photographs was announced for release later in the year; following this, the band performed on the main stage of that year's Warped Tour. On August 7, 2005, "Kiss Me, Kill Me" and "Take Me Away (Cried Out to Heaven)" were posted on the band's Myspace profile. The band supported Social Distortion on their headlining US tour from September 2005. On October 12, 2005, the music video for "Take Me Away (Cried Out to Heaven)" was posted online. That same day, Mest had to drop off the Social Distortion tour because of drummer Nick Gigler developing Carpal tunnel syndrome; they were replaced by Bullets and Octane. Six days later, Photographs was released through Maverick. Limited copies came with a bonus DVD entitled Seven Deadly Sins.

In January 2006, the band announced on their Myspace blog that they would break-up following a US tour, titled the So Long and Thanx for the Booze Tour. The trek ran from late January until early March, with support from Allister and Scary Kids Scaring Kids. Since the break-up, Lovato formed A Permanent Holiday, which featured members of Lit and Bleed the Dream.

== Track listing ==
1. "Take Me Away (Cried Out to Heaven)" (Tony Lovato, John Feldmann) – 3:41
2. "Kiss Me, Kill Me" (Jeremiah Rangel, Feldmann) – 3:34
3. "Photographs" (Lovato) – 3:01
4. "Cursed" (Rangel, Feldmann) – 3:39
5. "As His Black Heart Dies (My Mistake)" (Lovato) – 3:16
6. "This Time" (Lovato, Feldmann) – 3:45
7. "Graveyard" (Rangel, Feldmann) – 3:37
8. "Nightmare" (Lovato) – 3:36
9. "Can't Take This" (Lovato, Feldmann) – 3:28
10. "Dying for You" (Lovato, Feldmann) – 3:29
11. "Tonight Will Last Forever" (Rangel, Feldmann) – 4:15
12. "Last Kiss" (Lovato) – 3:45
