= Mest (album) =

Studio album by Mest
- Released: June 10, 2003
- Recorded: Foxy, Marina del Ray, California
- Genre: Pop punk
- Length: 49:26
- Label: Maverick
- Producers: John Feldmann, Young MC

Mest chronology
Destination Unknown (2001)	Mest (2003)	Photographs (2005)

Singles from Mest
- 1. "Jaded (These Years)" Released: July 1, 2003

Professional ratings
Review scores
Source	Rating
AllMusic	2.5/5 stars
Alternative Press	3/5
Blender	2/5 stars
Melodic	2.5/5 stars
Ultimate-Guitar	6/10 stars

Mest is the fourth studio album by American pop punk band Mest. It was released on June 10, 2003 by Maverick Records. From June to August 2003, the group went on the 2003 edition of Warped Tour. "Jaded (These Years)" was released to radio on July 1, 2003. The album peaked at #64 on the Billboard 200.

== Track listing ==
1. "Until I Met You" (Lovato/Madden) – 3:02
2. "Rooftops" (Lovato) – 3:54
3. "Jaded (These Years)" featuring Benji Madden (Lovato/Madden/Feldmann) – 3:10
4. "Night Alone" (Rangel) – 3:29
5. "Burning Bridges" (Lovato) – 3:30
6. "Walking on Broken Glass" (Feldmann/Lovato) – 3:35
7. "Your Promise" (Feldmann/Rangel) – 3:15
8. "2000 Miles" (Lovato) – 2:48
9. "Shell of Myself" (Rangel) – 3:47
10. "Lost, Broken, Confused" (Lovato) – 2:51
11. "Chance of a Lifetime" (Feldmann/Lovato) – 3:09
12. "Return to Self-Loathing" (Feldmann/Rangel) – 3:55
13. "Paradise (122nd and Highland)"/25 to Life (Hidden Track) (Feldmann/Lovato) – 8:34

Japan bonus tracks

1. "Got to Go"
2. "Cadillac" (live)
