= Vitamin R (Leading Us Along) =

Single by Chevelle

from the album This Type of Thinking (Could Do Us In)
- Released: August 2, 2004
- Length: 3:43 (album version)
- Label: Epic
- Songwriters: Pete Loeffler; Sam Loeffler; Joe Loeffler
- Producer: Michael "Elvis" Baskette

Chevelle singles chronology
"Closure" (2003)	"Vitamin R (Leading Us Along)" (2004)	"The Clincher" (2005)

Music video
- "Vitamin R (Leading Us Along)" on YouTube

"Vitamin R (Leading Us Along)" is a song by American rock band Chevelle. It was released in August 2004 as the lead single from their third studio album, This Type of Thinking (Could Do Us In). It was their second number-one hit on the Billboard Hot Mainstream Rock Tracks chart and reached number three on the Billboard Hot Modern Rock Tracks chart.

== Background ==
In interviews, it has been stated that Vitamin R is Ritalin. The song "Vitamin R (Leading US Along)" was written about a friend of Sam, Joe and Pete Loeffler, who was misdiagnosed with ADHD, and developed an addiction to Ritalin.

== Critical reception ==
Loudwire ranked it the second greatest Chevelle song.

== Music video ==
The song's music video revolves around imagery seen in the items of a cubicle. The images become real, life size landscapes that vocalist Pete Loeffler is seen drifting through.

== Charts ==
=== Weekly charts ===
Weekly chart performance for "Vitamin R (Leading Us Along)"
Chart (2004)	Peak position
Canada Rock Top 30 (Radio & Records)	22
US Billboard Hot 100	68
US Alternative Airplay (Billboard)	3
US Mainstream Rock (Billboard)	1

=== Year-end charts ===
2004 year-end chart performance for "Vitamin R (Leading Us Along)"
Chart (2004)	Position
US Mainstream Rock Tracks (Billboard)	32
US Modern Rock Tracks (Billboard)	32

2005 year-end chart performance for "Vitamin R (Leading Us Along)"
Chart (2005)	Position
US Mainstream Rock Tracks (Billboard)	35
US Modern Rock Tracks (Billboard)	43

== Certifications ==
Certifications for "Vitamin R (Leading Us Along)"
Region	Certification	Certified units/sales
United States (RIAA)	Gold	500,000^{‡}
^{‡} Sales+streaming figures based on certification alone.

== See also ==
- List of Billboard Mainstream Rock number-one songs of the 1980s
