= America (Deuce song) =

Single by Deuce

from the album Nine Lives
- Released: January 10, 2012
- Genre: Nu metal
- Length: 4:05
- Label: Five Seven
- Songwriters: Aron Erlichman, Jimmy Yuma (Jim Lee Milner)
- Producers: Deuce, Aaron Greene, Jimmy Yuma

Deuce singles chronology
"Let's Get It Crackin'" (2011)	"America" (2012)	"Help Me" (2012)

Music video
- "America" on YouTube

"America" is the second studio-release single from American artist Deuce and is a politically themed song with a stronger metal influence than some of Deuce's other music. It was released on January 10, 2012, a week earlier than originally planned due to a leak of the full music video in late December 2011. The song is the third track on Deuce's debut album titled Nine Lives.

== Track listing ==
Single

No.	Title	Length
1.	"America"	4:05

America(n) Pride

No.	Title	Length
1.	"America"	4:05
2.	"America" (Music Video)	4:06
3.	"America" (Big Chocolate Remix)	3:32
4.	"America" (Monikkr Remix)	4:02

== Charts ==
Chart (2012)	Peak position
US Rock Songs (Billboard)	41
US Hot Mainstream Rock Tracks (Billboard)	13
