= Nine Lives (Deuce album) =

Studio album by Deuce
- Released: April 24, 2012
- Recorded: 2008–2011
- Genres: Rap rock; alternative hip hop; alternative rock; nu metal
- Length: 44:34
- Label: Five Seven
- Producers: Deuce; Aaron Greene; Andrew Goldstein; Eugene Shakhov; Tristan Krause

Deuce chronology
They Call Me Big Deuce EP (2011)	Nine Lives (2012)	Invincible (2017)

Singles from Nine Lives
- 1. "Let's Get It Crackin'" Released: November 28, 2011; 2. "America" Released: January 10, 2012; 3. "Help Me" Released: April 3, 2012; 4. "Nobody Likes Me" Released: April 23, 2012; 5. "I Came to Party" Released: September 4, 2012; 6. "The One" Released: February 15, 2013

Nine Lives is the debut studio album by former Hollywood Undead rapper Deuce. The album was released on April 24, 2012, through 10th Street Entertainment. The album uses both new songs, remake versions, and demo songs recorded following Deuce's departure from Hollywood Undead in early 2010.

The album's first single, "Let's Get It Crackin'", which features Jeffree Star, was released on November 28, 2011, with an accompanying music video. The second single, entitled "America", was released on January 10, 2012, due to an early leak of the music video. The third single, "Help Me", was released on April 3, 2012, shortly before the album's release date. The fourth single, a clean version of the song "Nobody Likes Me", featuring Truth and Ronnie Radke of rock band Falling in Reverse, was released through iTunes on April 23, 2012, just before his studio album has been released the next day. His fifth single "I Came to Party" featuring Travie McCoy and Truth is released in the Party Pack single on September 4, 2012, which includes the "Rock Mix" version of the song along its two versions of music videos. Then, on February 15, 2013, the remake version of "The One", originally recorded for The Two Thousand Eight EP, his first extended play for original digital download in 2008, was released as his sixth single alongside its music video, which was directed by James Jou.

== Background ==
After he won a lawsuit and was free of his contract from A&M/Octone Records, Deuce began producing a full-length debut album Nine Lives, which was completed in late 2011 and would be released on April 24, 2012. The album will be released under 10th Street Entertainment and Five Seven Music and will contain collaborations with Travie McCoy, Ronnie Radke, and Skee-Lo, amongst others. The album's lead single, "Let's Get It Crackin'", was released November 28, 2011 with an accompanying music video and features Jeffree Star. The album's second single, "America", was initially set to be released on January 17, 2012, but was released a week early on January 10 due to a leak of the full music video in December 2011. Deuce commented on the album, saying, "This album has that signature Deuce sound and is similar in flavor to what I [helped make] on Swan Songs, but completely unrestricted and rated NC-17. I took some of the shit I couldn’t get away with on Swan Songs and brought it to another level for Nine Lives. If you liked what I did before, you will love this..."

The album artwork for Nine Lives was released in February 2012 by Loudwire, the same day Deuce announced that he will be joining artists such as Blood on the Dance Floor, BrokeNCYDE, The Bunny The Bear, William Control, New Years Day, Polkadot Cadaver, and Haley Rose on the "Fight To Unite Tour". "Help Me", which was delayed over a month, was released on April 3, 2012, with a music video released by Hot Topic on April 17. The full album was streamed on Spotify a week before release on April 17, 2012. Leading up to the release of Nine Lives, Deuce has released nine short videos previewing and explaining each song on the album.

== Music and lyrical themes ==
Nine Lives opens with the lead single "Let's Get It Crackin'", a party song featuring pop singer/model Jeffree Star which Deuce has described as "nasty". The second track is the album's third single, "Help Me", which addresses Deuce's troubles with his old label holding him under contract as well as Hollywood Undead. The third song on the album is "America", which is a politically themed song with more of a rock influence than some of Deuce's other songs. "America" is currently the most successful single, selling 36,000 copies since its release and has been played on several radio stations. Track number four of the record, "I Came to Party", is a party themed song featuring Truth and successful east-coast rapper Travie McCoy of Gym Class Heroes. The song fuses dubstep, rock, rap and pop elements to create an upbeat and diverse dance-track. The next song is a remastered version of a track previously released with The Two Thousand Eight EP in 2008, titled "The One", although it models the redone 2010 version. When speaking of the song, Deuce states that "through my music, I could so much." The sixth song of the record is also a remastered version of a previous release named "Freaky Now". This song is similar in content to "Let's Get It Crackin'" and could also be described as "nasty" and it is highly explicit. The song also features Jeffree Star, as well as fellow rapper Truth. The seventh track called "Nobody Likes Me" is a biographic-themed song featuring Falling in Reverse lead singer Ronnie Radke and Truth. The song tells of how each vocalist felt they were betrayed by their previous bands, and expresses the various emotions that come with being in that situation. Radke delivers his verse through the form of a rap. The song also features a small part from Truth. The eighth song of the record is an emotional track titled "Walk Alone" is apparently aimed at Johnny 3 Tears, ex-bandmate from Hollywood Undead. The next and ninth track on the album is "Till I Drop", an upbeat, anthem-style song featuring rappers Veze Skante, Truth and Gadjet (frontman of rap group Kinda Major). The song contains fast-paced verses from all parties, with Deuce singing catchy choruses and using his signature melodic-rap style to end the song. Deuce mentions moving on from his previous band to his newest project with "there's no more Undead, it's Nine Lives..." halfway into the final verse. Deuce describes "Till I Drop" as a "powerful song." "Gravestone", the album's tenth song that was also a remastered version of a previously released song. Deuce describes the song as being about "changes" and how certain experiences can change your life and outlook on life. "It's kinda' saying good bye to the old you [...] it's a gravestone to the old you, you don't wanna be that person any more." The final song on the album is titled "Now You See My Life", and, once again, is a remastered version of a previously released song with the same title that originally appeared on his first extended play. However, this song was remixed to fit a verse for rapper Skee-Lo. Deuce gives the song the description of his life not being as "pretty" as it seems.

=== Commercial performance ===
When the album was released, it reached No. 37 on the Billboard 200, No. 2 on Hard Rock Albums, No. 13 on Top Rock Albums, No. 9 on the Top Alternative Albums, No. 9 on Top Alternative Albums, No. 7 on Top Independent Albums charts in the United States and No. 38 on the Canadian Albums Chart.

=== Critical response ===
Professional ratings
Review scores
Source	Rating
Allmusic	3/5 stars
Loudwire	4/5 stars
Evigshed	3/5 stars
BringTheNoiseUK	5.5/10 stars

Nine Lives received generally mixed reviews from most music critics. David Jeffries from Allmusic said "...if being cocksure and crafty are essential elements of success with scene teens, then Deuce just won your kid's heart."

== Track listing ==
No.	Title	Writer(s)	Length
1.	"Let's Get It Crackin'" (featuring Jeffree Star)	Deuce, Jimmy Yuma, Arina Chloe, Jeffree Star	4:48
2.	"Help Me"	Deuce, Yuma	4:17
3.	"America"	Deuce, Aaron Greene, Yuma	4:05
4.	"I Came to Party" (featuring Travie McCoy & Truth)	Deuce, Chloe, Andrew Goldstein, McCoy, Yuma	3:39
5.	"The One"	Deuce, Aaron Greene, Yuma	3:35
6.	"Freaky Now" (featuring Truth & Jeffree Star)	Deuce, Yuma, Jeffree Star, Truth	4:33
7.	"Nobody Likes Me" (featuring Truth & Ronnie Radke)	Deuce, Radke, Yuma, Eugene Shakhov	5:24
8.	"Walk Alone"	Deuce, Yuma	3:20
9.	"Till I Drop" (featuring Truth, Gadjet & Veze Skante)	Deuce, Yuma, Gadjet, Veze Skante, Shakhov, Truth	4:42
10.	"Gravestone"	Deuce, Yuma	3:54
11.	"Now You See My Life" (featuring Skee-Lo)	Deuce, Skee-Lo, Yuma	4:17
Total length:			46:34

American iTunes Bonus Track Edition
No.	Title	Length
12.	"Walk the Walk" (featuring Gadjet)	3:42
Total length:		50:16

Canadian iTunes
No.	Title	Length
12.	"Deuce Dot Com"	3:24
13.	"Don't Approach Me"	4:05
14.	"Walk the Walk" (featuring Gadjet)	3:42
Total length:		57:45

Best Buy Exclusive tracks
No.	Title	Length
12.	"Deuce Dot Com"	3:24
13.	"Don't Approach Me"	4:05
Total length:		54:03

F.Y.E. Exclusive tracks
No.	Title	Length
12.	"Hollyhood Vacation" (featuring Truth)	4:20
Total length:		50:54

European Exclusive tracks
No.	Title	Length
12.	"Don't Speak Bitch"	2:39
Total length:		49:13

Japan Exclusive tracks
No.	Title	Length
12.	"Set It Off" (featuring Truth)	3:46
Total length:		52:59

=== Notes ===
- "The One", "Don't Speak Bitch", "Set It Off", "Freaky Now", "Gravestone", "Now You See My Life", "Hollyhood Vacation", "Don't Approach Me", and "Deuce Dot Com" are all songs that have been released over the years prior to the release of Nine Lives, but were re-recorded and remastered for the album.
- "Freaky Now" is not included in the clean version of the album.

== Personnel ==
Credits for Nine Lives adapted from Allmusic.

=== Musicians ===
Deuce (band)

- Deuce – vocals, bass guitar
- Jimmy Yuma – guitar
- Arina Chloe – composer, keyboards
- Tye Gaddis – drums

Additional musicians

- Magnus Högdahl – guitar
- Kevin Thrasher – guitar
- Nolan McIntyre – guitar on "Let's Get It Crackin'"
- Paul Pavao – guitar on "America", "Help Me", "I Came to Party", "Nobody Likes Me", "Till I Drop", and "Gravestone"

Appearing as "Featuring Artist"

- Travie McCoy – rapping
- Veze Skante – rapping
- Jeffree Star – composer, rapping
- Gadjet – composer, rapping
- Truth – composer, rapping
- Ronnie Radke – composer, rapping, clean vocals
- Skee-Lo - rapping

=== Production and technical ===
Producers

- Deuce – Executive producer, engineer
- Andrew Goldstein – producer
- Aaron Greene – producer
- Eugene Shakhov – producer, programming
- Tristan Krause – producer

Engineers

- Gadjet
- Travie McCoy
- Veze Skante
- Jeffree Star
- Truth
- Jimmy Yuma
- Gabriel Anro
- Nolan McIntyre

Additional production, technicalities

- Paul Pavao – engineer, mixing
- Ben Grosse – executive mixer, mixing
- Howie Weinberg – mastering
- David E. Jackson – art direction, photography
- Eddie Velez – art direction

== Chart performance ==
Chart (2012)	Peak position
US Billboard 200	37
US Top Rock Albums	13
US Top Alternative Albums	9
US Top Independent Albums	7
US Top Hard Rock Albums	2
Canadian Albums Chart	38

== Release history ==
=== CD ===
Region	Date	Label
United States	April 24, 2012	Five Seven Music
Worldwide	May 7, 2012	Five Seven Music
