= This Type of Thinking (Could Do Us In) =

Studio album by Chevelle
- Released: September 21, 2004
- Recorded: January–May 2004
- Genres: Alternative metal; nu metal
- Length: 46:32
- Label: Epic
- Producers: Michael "Elvis" Baskette; Chevelle

Chevelle chronology
Wonder What's Next (2002)	This Type of Thinking (Could Do Us In) (2004)	Vena Sera (2007)

Singles from This Type of Thinking (Could Do Us In)
- 1. "Vitamin R (Leading Us Along)" Released: August 2, 2004; 2. "The Clincher" Released: January 25, 2005; 3. "Panic Prone" Released: July 19, 2005

This Type of Thinking (Could Do Us In) is the third studio album by the American rock band Chevelle. Debuting at No. 8 on the Billboard 200 based on nearly 90,000 copies sold in its first week, it charted higher than its predecessor, Wonder What's Next but did not exceed its debut position. The album did not manage to match its predecessor's commercial success, but was certified platinum. This Type of Thinking follows generally the same heavy style as Wonder What's Next with popular singles like "Vitamin R" and "The Clincher". It would be the first of two records produced by Michael "Elvis" Baskette. This was also the final album that all of the Loeffler brothers involved together, following the departure of bassist Joe Loeffler from the band in 2005.

== Background and recording ==
Coming off a highly successful major label debut, Chevelle finishing touring on December 17, 2003. They set out to write a follow-up album from scratch at the onset of the following year in what drummer Sam Loeffler described as a different approach to writing. He also noted how the band felt significant pressure from their label to not simply match but topple the platinum success of Wonder What's Next. In a 2004 interview, Loeffler described the process of approaching This Type of Thinking:

"We went home for Christmas and after New Year's we went into the studio and we said, 'All right, we have to write a whole record in basically four months.' We had no songs, so we had to write that whole record and we ended up taking five months. We wanted to go heavy, we wanted to do a lot of double-bass drum, kind of syncopated rhythms, and we wanted to basically write songs that we could bob our heads to. That was sort of where we started. We're a heavy melodic rock band, that's what we like to write, and that's what we like to play. And that's what we did."

This time around, Chevelle opted to produce their own album with the help of Michael "Elvis" Baskette. This Type of Thinking would continue the balance of melody and heaviness of its predecessor. And much like the final track on Wonder What's Next, "Bend the Bracket" would be recorded simply as an acoustic demo for its unpolished presentation.

== Critical reception ==
Professional ratings
Review scores
Source	Rating
AllMusic	2/5 stars
Robert Christgau	(dud)
E! Online	B−
Kludge	6/10
Melodic	3.5/5 stars
Spin	C

AllMusic editor Johnny Loftus observes the album as "...flatly mixed, lost in depression, and obsessed with rewriting "Sober" for a new generation of lank-haired misunderstoods."

Melodic calls it "...a real quality album that you will never get bored of.", praising the songs "The Clincher", "Vitamin R (Leading Us Along)" and "Another Know It All".

== Track listing ==
All tracks are written by Chevelle.

No.	Title	Length
1.	"The Clincher"	3:43
2.	"Get Some"	4:27
3.	"Vitamin R (Leading Us Along)"	3:43
4.	"Still Running"	3:43
5.	"Breach Birth"	4:03
6.	"Panic Prone"	3:50
7.	"Another Know It All"	4:20
8.	"Tug-O-War"	4:32
9.	"To Return"	3:42
10.	"Emotional Drought"	5:24
11.	"Bend the Bracket"	5:05
Total length:		46:32

DualDisc version
No.	Title	Length
12.	"Behind the Scenes"
13.	"The Making of the "Vitamin R (Leading Us Along)" video"
14.	"Interviews"
15.	"Entire album in enhanced stereo"
16.	"The Clincher (Version 103)" (enhanced stereo)	3:39

== Personnel ==
Chevelle

- Pete Loeffler – guitar, vocals
- Joe Loeffler – bass, backing vocals
- Sam Loeffler – drums

Technical personnel

- Andy Wallace – mixing
- Ben Goldman – A&R
- Christian Lantry – photography
- Dave Holdredge – digital editing, drum programming, engineer
- Eddy Schreyer – mastering
- Farra Mathews – A&R
- Jef Moll – assistant
- Josh Wilbur – digital editing
- Katharina Fritsch – cover sculpture
- Kevin Dean – assistant
- Michael "Elvis" Baskette – engineer, producer
- Sean Evans – art direction
- Steve Sisco – assistant

== Charts ==
Chart (2004)	Peak position
Billboard 200	8

== Certifications ==
Region	Certification	Certified units/sales
United States (RIAA)	Platinum	1,000,000^{‡}
^{‡} Sales+streaming figures based on certification alone.
