= The Clincher =

Single by Chevelle

from the album This Type of Thinking (Could Do Us In)
- Released: January 25, 2005
- Genre: Alternative metal; nu metal
- Length: 3:43
- Label: Epic
- Songwriters: Pete Loeffler; Sam Loeffler; Joe Loeffler
- Producers: Michael Baskette; Chevelle

Chevelle singles chronology
"Vitamin R (Leading Us Along)" (2004)	"The Clincher" (2005)	"Panic Prone" (2005)

Music video
- "The Clincher" on YouTube

"The Clincher" is a song by American rock band Chevelle, released as the second single from the band's third album This Type of Thinking (Could Do Us In). The song is about claustrophobia, as confirmed by Sam Loeffler. Despite this, many people still mistakenly infer that the song is the band's take on The Passion of Christ, due to lyrics like "helped to nail down" which refers to the crucifixion.

== Music video ==
The music video, directed by Nathan Cox, features the band Chevelle performing in the woods while a boy collects bugs. One of the bugs he collects turns out to be a beautiful angel (played by Nicole Marie Lenz) who endures great suffering when she is framed and mounted on the wall. At the end of the video, the boy recognizes her pain and ultimately frees her.

== Critical reception ==
Loudwire ranked it the sixth greatest Chevelle song.

== Charts ==
=== Weekly charts ===
Weekly chart performance for "The Clincher"
Chart (2005)	Peak position
US Bubbling Under Hot 100 (Billboard)	8
US Alternative Airplay (Billboard)	8
US Mainstream Rock (Billboard)	3

=== Year-end charts ===
Year-end chart performance for "The Clincher"
Chart (2005)	Position
US Modern Rock Tracks (Billboard)	26

== Certifications ==
Certifications for "The Clincher"
Region	Certification	Certified units/sales
United States (RIAA)	Gold	500,000^{‡}
^{‡} Sales+streaming figures based on certification alone.
