= Deuce (musician) =

American musician (born 1983)

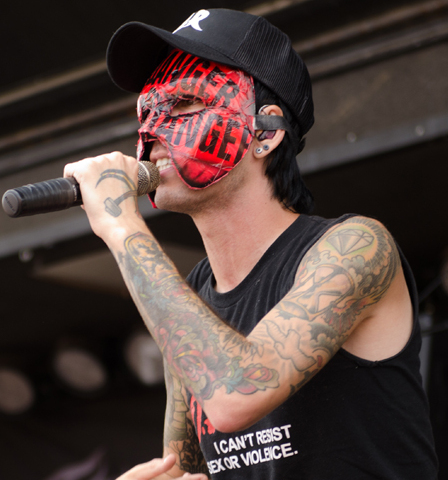
- Deuce performing live at Uproar festival 2012

Background information
- Also known as: Tha Producer
- Born: Aron Erlichman; March 2, 1983 (age 43); Los Angeles, California, U.S.
- Genres: Rap rock; rapcore; nu metal; alternative rock; hip hop; alternative metal
- Occupations: Guitarist; singer; songwriter; producer; rapper
- Instruments: Vocals, guitar, bass
- Years active: 2001–present
- Labels: Five Seven, Better Noise, Geffen
- Formerly of: Hollywood Undead

Aron Erlichman (born March 2, 1983), better known by his stage name Deuce (shortened from "Tha Producer"), is an American rapper, music producer and guitarist. Brought to fame as a member of the rap rock band Hollywood Undead, Deuce departed from Hollywood Undead in 2010 and has since moved on to solo work through the label "Five Seven Music", a branch of Eleven Seven Music. He was formerly involved in a movement with fellow rapper Truth (Vardan Aslanyan) called "Nine Lives" (often stylized as both "9LIVES" and "IX LIVES"). Deuce released his debut album of the same name on April 24, 2012, which sold 11,425 copies in its first week. Deuce has also collaborated with artists NXTREADY, Ronnie Radke, Brokencyde and Blood on the Dance Floor.

== Career ==
=== Musical beginnings (2005) ===
Deuce began creating rock-based music under his birth name of Aron Erlichman, early in 2005. In 2005, he released four tracks—"Franny", "Surface Air", "Breaking Through", and "Sometimes"—from his first EP called The Aron EP on Broadjam, an Internet sharing site. He later co-founded Hollywood Undead with Jorel Decker and Jeff Phillips, and sang clean vocals and produced instrumentals for the band, until his departure from the band in early 2010. In early February 2012, three more pre-Hollywood Undead tracks were released and surfaced, including "Far Away", "Fallen Stone", and "Dreams".

=== Hollywood Undead (2005–2010) ===
Deuce co-founded the band Hollywood Undead as a vocalist and producer with close friend Jorel Decker (J-Dog). The band began their musical career with the creation of the rap-rock song "The Kids", which was greatly promoted by Jeffree Star. Deuce initially adopted and recorded songs with the band under the pseudonym "Tha Producer" due to his role in production but shortened this pseudonym to "Tha Prodeuca" and then "Deuce" not long after. At the time of Deuce's departure, Hollywood Undead had gained success with Swan Songs, which peaked at number 22 on the Billboard 200 in its first week. A few EPs were released, the Swan Songs B-Sides EP and the Swan Songs Rarities EP in 2009 and 2010, respectively. In 2009, Hollywood Undead released their first live album, Desperate Measures, which peaked at number 29 on the Billboard 200.

In late 2009, Deuce left Hollywood Undead due to creative and personal disagreements with the other band members.

The first song he wrote following his departure was a song titled "Story of a Snitch" about Hollywood Undead. The titular 'snitch' allegedly being Hollywood Undead member J-Dog, with the lyrics consisting mainly of obscenities and insults directed towards Hollywood Undead, also making claims such as he was kicked out of the band and that members of the band were "tryin' to spit just like me [Deuce] but they don't have it".

In an interview with YouTube interviewer BryanStars, Hollywood Undead members Johnny 3 Tears and Da Kurlzz were asked why Deuce left the band, and answered by stating people would "bend over backwards to accommodate Deuce in a lot of ways" and also noted disagreements about songwriting. Deuce in a different interview with BryanStars, however, claimed the other band band members were jealous of his talent, among other grieveances. Deuece also claimed the other band members disapproved of his maintaining a personal Twitter account to communicate with fans.

Deuce states that he was also signed as a solo artist by A&M/Octone when the label signed Hollywood Undead. He released his first four-track EP, The Two Thousand Eight EP, which contained songs "The One", "Gravestone", "Hollyhood Vacation" (featuring Truth) and "Deuce Dot Com". All four songs would later be remastered and released within his début album. The EP was released through iTunes and received little success. Shortly after Deuce was evicted from the band, the EP disappeared from iTunes. Deuce accused the label of breaching the original contract terms and later sued the company under this accusation. Deuce discovered a loophole that revealed he was permitted to produce remixes and mixtape-style songs using the instrumentals of other musicians, so long as he did not incur a profit.

=== They Call Me Big Deuce EP (2010–2011) ===
In September 2010, Deuce made his first official live performance as a solo artist at California's Epicenter music festival, opening for Eminem, Blink-182, Kiss, Bush, Rise Against, and others.

In September 2011, They Call Me Big Deuce EP was released as the first collective release of material by American singer-rapper Deuce as an independent solo-artist. Consisting of 14 previously released songs, the mixtape contains verses over instrumentals by 50 Cent, Eminem, Tupac Shakur, B.o.B and Jay-Z. The mixtape did not contain the previously released songs "Freaky Now", "Surface Air" and "Now You See My Life", which would later be released with his debut album a year later.

=== Nine Lives (2011–2013) ===
Deuce completed work for his debut album in late 2011. The album was scheduled to be released March 27, 2012, by Five Seven Music; however, it was pushed back until April 24, 2012. The album artwork for Nine Lives was released on February 10 by Loudwire, who also announced that Deuce would be joining artists Blood on the Dance Floor, Brokencyde, The Bunny The Bear, William Control, New Years Day, Polkadot Cadaver, and Haley Rose on the Fight To Unite Tour.

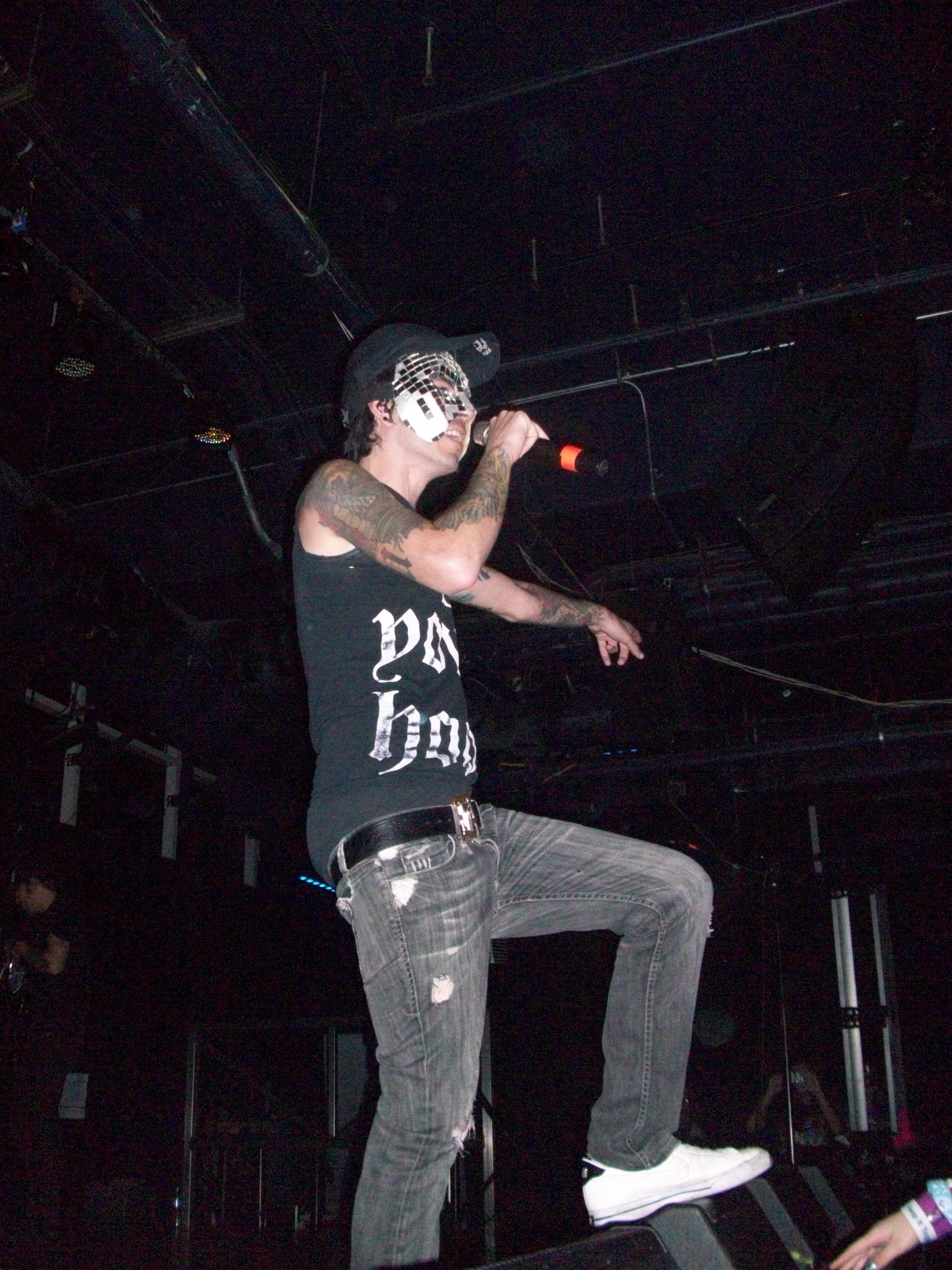
Deuce performing live

The lead single, "Let's Get It Crackin'", was released November 28, 2011, with an accompanying music video and features Jeffree Star. The album's second single, "America", was initially set to be released for January 2012, but was released a week early on January 10 due to a leak of the full music video in December 2011. Deuce commented on the album saying, "This album has that signature Deuce sound and is similar in flavor to what I created on Swan Songs, but completely unrestricted and rated NC-17. I took some of the shit I couldn't get away with on Swan Songs and brought it to another level for Nine Lives. If you liked what I did before, you will love this...". The album's third and final single before release was titled "Help Me". The song makes fun of the music industry as a whole and particularly James Diener of A&M/Octone. The song was finally released on March 27.

In an interview by Gibson guitars, Deuce talked about the inspiration of his single "America". "I was just going through a weird time, and I was really down. Then I said, 'I don't care how bad my life is, I'm just going to accept it and use it to my advantage". When comparing Nine Lives to Swan Songs, Deuce said "It's not like last time where there were so many people, now it's all Deuce. Before it was people who weren't producers and not song-writers trying to change things, and now it's just Deuce and I can do exactly what I want."

Nine Lives ended up selling 11,425 copies in the United States during its first week, peaking at number 37 on the Billboard 200.

A remix EP, titled Deuce REMIXXXED, was released on May 5, 2012, with remixes of both "America" and "Let's Get It Crackin'". On July 3, a single was released for Independence Day which was called the "America(n) Pride", which contained "America", two remixes, and the music video on iTunes. On July 17, 2012, Deuce released a remix of "I Came To Party" with "Rock mix" in parenthesize via his official Twitter account. The song, as the name suggests, has a heavier rock feel than the original and includes a new verse at the beginning.

Deuce participated on the Uproar Festival 2012 on the Jägermeister stage along with Redlight King, In This Moment and Thousand Foot Krutch. In 2013, Deuce was awarded "New Artist of the Year" from loudwire, beating Tremonti and Falling in Reverse.

On February 14, 2013, Deuce released "The One" (Nine Lives version) as a single and music video. He was also once again scheduled to be part of the Fight to Unite 2013 tour along with Kottonmouth Kings, Dizzy Wright, Eskimo Callboy, and Snow tha Product.

Following an arrest after a car chase throughout the Los Angeles area on June 15, 2012, long-time collaborator Truth was prevented from touring with the band outside of LA. In March 2013, Truth announced he was "retired from recording" and was leaving the music industry.

=== Invincible (2013–2018) ===
On May 19, 2013, Deuce for the second time participated on the Rock on the Range 2013 on the Jägermeister Stage on day three of the festival, along with Middle Class Rut, Thousand Foot Krutch, Beware of Darkness and Bad Remedy.

In May 2013, Deuce also confirmed that he had been working on a second album, had already recorded ideas, and was working on full-length material for songs. He was also hoping to have collaborations on his rock songs. Deuce had posted on Facebook that he will be releasing new material around Christmas and that he would be collaborating with Ronnie Radke of Falling in Reverse, and will also be releasing other new material of his own. On October 17, 2013, Deuce's sister Arina Chloe released a single that featured Deuce titled "Will You Cry for Me."

On January 21, 2014, Deuce confirmed on Twitter that he is collaborating with Blood on the Dance Floor for the second time on a new song called "We're Takin' Over!", and that the artwork for the single was being released the following day.

On March 28, 2014, Deuce performed for the first time outside of the United States in Moscow, Russia. Deuce also performed a new song called "Nightmare" from his upcoming album, and announced that its release would be in the summer. In early 2014, Bryan Lay stopped as Deuce's hype man in order to work on his mixtape "Initiation Part 2". The two still remain on good terms. In May, Deuce announced that longtime collaborator and rapper, Gadjet, would be the new hype man for the band via Instagram. Deuce confirmed that Gadjet would make another appearance on his next project.

On October 31, 2015, Deuce leaked Invincible online to his fans. On November 4, 2015, his label took down the album.

On September 29, 2016, From Ashes to New released a single, "The Last Time", featuring Deuce.

On December 1, 2017, Deuce released Invincible. Invincible in its official form had a different track listing from its older unofficial form. Many of the new tracks that comprised the official release were received negatively. To compensate for this, tracks cut from the unofficial version of Invincible were then released as the Nightmare EP on March 2, 2018.

=== Inactivity and legal issues (2018–present) ===
He has been arrested multiple times since 2018 with charges including aggravated harassment, resisting arrest, assault of a public safety officer and theft.

Deuce has been on hiatus for several years and has not performed live since 2014. However, Deuce still regularly communicates with his fans on Twitter. He claims to be actively working on music, and says to expect something new coming in the near future.

== Fan base and Nine Lives movement ==
Nine Lives was a rap group founded by rappers Serve and Truth. Though it later devolved into Deuce's backup band and also the name of Deuce's brand name. Truth was the C.E.O. of the Nine Lives movement, and ran the company from an office located on Vine, between Hollywood and Franklin. Truth has given the term a similar description as Deuce, adding that "Nine Lives" was also a clothing line and brand, partnered with American Apparel. Deuce used to also be partnered with clothing line "Plrklr".

== Legal issues and controversy ==
Deuce was arrested multiple times between 2018, 2020 and 2022.

Deuce filed a lawsuit against the A&M/Octone label claiming a breach of contract. The suit alleged that the label refused to release his solo music because the vulgarity and gang references in the lyrics made the music not commercial enough. Additionally, it alleged Deuce was forced out of the band by its members and said he feared for his safety after anti-Semitic slurs were leveled at him, and that a gun was pointed at him by a former band member. The lawsuit was settled privately out of court, the visible results being that Deuce is now able to release music under a new label, as well as keep his stage-name and mask designs. Deuce commented on the legal situation and how it affected him while writing his debut album, noting, "It just made me tougher and stronger. Having to write, record and make a whole album during a period of time when your music's being taken down could be hard and a lot of people could lose duration or hope. But I have my skills, because I've written so much with my old band that it just didn't affect me too much."

== Musical style, lyrical themes, and influences ==
Deuce uses a mixture of rap rock and hip hop music with elements of metal music, much like his former band Hollywood Undead and has been compared to such, along with the early works of Eminem, particularly from his works off the debut album Nine Lives. Deuce's lyricism which is similar to Hollywood Undead's tends to be a mixture of serious then sexual themes, often using explicit language, and has been negatively criticized due to choice of wording.

Deuce's album Nine Lives has often been seen as a successor to the Swan Songs album by his fans and in some reviews and even claimed in multiple interviews himself that the album is. He said, in an interview with YouTube personality BryanStars, that he wrote and produced on that album and continued to say that his music was better than what the band is now without him and that people should listen to his album if they want songs akin to Swan Songs.

Deuce cites Wu-Tang Clan, Method Man, Eminem, Jay-Z, D-12, Nirvana, The Offspring, Linkin Park, Pennywise, NOFX, Rancid, and Machine Gun Kelly as influences.

Deuce's musical style has been described as rap rock.

== Band members ==
Although a solo artist, Deuce used to perform with a backup band known as Nine Lives to provide additional instrumentation and vocals. The group's current status is unknown, as they haven't performed live since 2014, and most members' social media have been deleted or inactive. The following list includes Deuce's band, though does not feature the many early rappers in Nine Lives alongside Deuce.

Current

- Aron "Deuce" Erlichman – lead vocals, bass, keyboards (2008–present)
- James "Jimmy Yuma" Milner – lead guitar, vocals (2008–present), rhythm guitar (2008–2014)
- Arina "Arina Chloe" Erlichman – keyboards, vocals (2010–present)
- Tye Gaddis – drums, percussion (2010–2012; 2013–present)
- James Kloeppel – bass, rhythm guitar (2014–present), vocals (2017–present)
- Anthony "Gadjet" Leonard – vocals, hype man (2014–present)

Former

- Vardan "Truth" Aslanyan – vocals, hype man (2008–2013)
- Jeffrey "XXX" Wilkes – drums (2008–2009)

Former touring musicians

- Bryan "b.LaY" Lay – vocals, hype man (2012–2014)

Timeline

== Discography ==
=== Solo ===
- The Aron (EP) (2005, 2022 Unofficial)
- The Two Thousand Eight (EP) (2008)
- The 'Call Me Big Deuce' (EP) (2011, Re-Released 2023 Unofficial)
- Nine Lives (2012)
- Deuce Remixxxed (EP) (2012)
- Invincible (2015 unofficial, 2017 official)
- Nightmare EP (2018)
- Nine Lives Forever (2022) - Not officially released from Deuce.
- Turn Off The Lights (EP) (2024) - Not officially released from Deuce.

=== With Hollywood Undead ===
- Swan Songs (2008)
- Desperate Measures (2009)
