= 2016 in rock music =

This article summarizes the events related to rock music for the year of 2016.

== Notable events ==
=== January ===
- Disturbed's single "The Light" tops the US Billboard Mainstream Rock Songs chart for five weeks straight, in a run that began in December 2015.
- Five Finger Death Punch's single "Wash It All Away" tops the Mainstream Rock chart for two weeks.
- Panic! at the Disco releases their fifth studio album, Death of a Bachelor. The album is the first to be recorded entirely by frontman Brendon Urie, and has the highest first week debut to date for Panic! at the Disco, selling 190,000 album equivalent units on the US Billboard 200 all-format chart.

=== February ===
- Shinedown's single "State of My Head" tops the Mainstream Rock song chart, and stays there for six straight weeks. It is their second of four singles from their album Threat to Survival to top it, and tenth overall at the time.
- Coldplay performs at the halftime show for Super Bowl 50. The performance also pushes the album sales of their seventh studio album, A Head Full of Dreams, from December 2015, back up to number 4 on the Billboard 200, selling another 90,000 album equivalent units.

=== March ===
- Disturbed's single "The Sound of Silence", a rock cover version of the song by "Simon & Garfunkel", tops the Mainstream Rock chart for seven straight weeks. The song goes on to be their highest performing song of their career to-date, going triple platinum in the US, selling 3 million copies, and having cross-over success, peaking at number 42 on the US all-format Billboard Hot 100 chart. The band later received a Grammy Nomination for the song as well.
- Asking Alexandria releases their fourth studio album, The Black, their first and only song with replacement vocalist Denis Stoff. It debuts at number 9, selling 30,000 album equivalent units.
- Killswitch Engage releases their seventh studio album, Incarnate. It debuts at number 6, selling 33,000 album equivalent units.
- The Wonder Stuff releases their eighth studio album, 30 Goes Around the Sun. It peaks within the top 40 of the UK albums chart; it becomes their first studio album to do so since Construction for the Modern Idiot (1993).

=== April ===
- Deftones release their eighth studio album, Gore. It debuts at number 2 on the Billboard 200 chart, selling 71,000 album equivalent units. The album also tops the all-format chart of Australia and New Zealand as well, a first for the band.
- Rob Zombie releases his sixth studio album, The Electric Warlock Acid Witch Satanic Orgy Celebration Dispenser. It debuts at number 6 on the Billboard 200 chart, selling 41,000 album equivalent units.

=== May ===
- Red Sun Rising's single "Emotionless" tops the Mainstream Rock chart for 2 weeks. The band is the first band since Trapt in 2003 to have their first two major record label singles top the chart; Red Sun Rising does it with "The Otherside" and "Emotionless", while Trapt had one it with "Headstrong" and "Still Frame".
- Volbeat's single "The Devil's Bleeding Crown" tops the Mainstream Rock chart, and stays there for 8 straight weeks. It is their fifth song to top the chart.
- Pierce the Veil release their fifth studio album, Misadventures. It debuts at number 4 on the Billboard 200 chart, selling 54,000 album equivalent units, and is the band's best debut of their career.
- Radiohead releases their ninth studio album, A Moon Shaped Pool. It debuts at number 3 on the Billboard 200, selling 181,000 album equivalent units.

=== June ===
- The Red Hot Chili Peppers release their eleventh studio album, The Getaway. It debuts at number 2 on the Billboard 200 chart, selling 118,000 album equivalent units. It also is the top album on the Billboard Top Album Sales chart, selling 108,000 copies.
- Volbeat releases their sixth studio album, Seal the Deal & Let's Boogie. It debuted at number 4 on the Billboard 200 chart, selling 51,000 album equivalent units, the band's best charting performance in their career.

=== July ===
- Blink-182 releases their seventh studio album, California. It tops the Billboard 200 chart, selling 186,000 album equivalent units, and is the first album to break Drake's ninth week streak at the top of the chart with his album Views. The album is their second to top the chart, the first being 2001's Take Off Your Pants and Jacket, and the band's first album to feature Matt Skiba, who replaced Tom Delonge the year prior. The album would be the first for the band to receive a Grammy Nomination as well, for Best Rock Album, and produced a number 1 single, "Bored to Death", on the Billboard Alternative Songs chart.
- Red Hot Chili Peppers' single "Dark Necessities" tops the Mainstream Rock chart for three weeks. The song also tops the Alternative Songs chart and the Adult Alternative Songs charts, making it one of only four songs to ever top all three Billboard charts, one of the prior being their own "Dani California".
- Chevelle releases their eighth studio album, The North Corridor. It debuts at number 8 on the Billboard 200 chart, selling 33,000 album equivalent units.

=== August ===
- Chevelle's single "Joyride (Omen)" tops the Mainstream Rock chart for 4 weeks straight. It is their fifth song to do so.
- Skillet releases their ninth studio album, Unleashed. The album debuts at number 3 on the Billboard 200 chart, selling 62,000 album equivalent units, and eventually is certified Gold, indicating half a million copies sold.

=== September ===
- A Day to Remember releases their sixth studio album, Bad Vibrations. It debuts at no. 2 on the Billboard 200 chart, selling 67,000 album equivalent units, which factors in music streaming figures, and was the top selling album, topping the Billboard Top Album Sales chart. The album was their first to be released following a protracted legal battle with their prior record label, Victory Records, and their highest album debut to date.
- Jack White releases the compilation album Acoustic Recordings 1998–2016, featuring alternate and unreleased material from his solo recordings and prior bands The White Stripes and The Raconteurs. It debuts at number 8 on the Billboard 200 chart, selling 32,000 album equivalent units.

=== October ===
- Green Day releases their twelfth studio album, Revolution Radio. It tops the Billboard 200 chart, selling 95,000 album equivalent units. It is their third album to top the chart, after American Idiot (2004) and 21st Century Breakdown (2009).
- Alter Bridge releases their fifth studio album, The Last Hero. It debuts at number 8, selling 28,000 album equivalent units.
- Kings of Leon release their seventh studio album, Walls. It tops the Billboard 200 chart, selling 77,000 album equivalent units. It is the band's first album to top the chart.
- Avenged Sevenfold surprise-releases their seventh studio album, The Stage without any prior announcements. The album debuts at number 4 on the Billboard 200 chart, moving 76,000 album equivalent units.

=== November ===
- Disturbed's single "Open Your Eyes" tops the Mainstream Rock chart for a week. It is their seventh song to do so, and their fourth from their album Immortalized.

=== December ===
- Highly Suspect's single "My Name is Human" tops the Mainstream Rock chart. It is the band's first song to do so. It stays at the top position for 8 straight weeks.
- Metallica releases their tenth studio album, Hardwired... to Self-Destruct. It tops the Billboard 200 chart, selling 291,000 album equivalent units. It is the top debut for a rock album in 2016, and the third highest debut of 2016 overall, just behind Drake's Views and Beyoncé's Lemonade.
- The Rolling Stones release their first studio album of newly recorded music since 2005 - the blues rock cover song album Blue & Lonesome. It debuts at number 4 on the Billboard 200 chart, selling 123,000 album equivalent units. It is the band's 37th top 10 album for the chart - an all-time record.

== Deaths ==
- David Bowie dies on January 10, 2016, at 69 years old. He dies after a long-running battle with cancer.
- Two members of Emerson, Lake & Palmer - Keith Emerson and Greg Lake die in 2016.

== Band breakups ==
- Finch
- Motion City Soundtrack
- Yellowcard

== Bands reformed ==
- The Yellow Monkey
