= Loser (band) =

American rock band

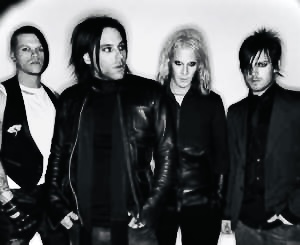
- Loser group promo in 2006.

Background information
- Origin: West Hollywood, California, U.S.
- Genres: Alternative rock
- Years active: 2005–2006
- Label: Island/Def Jam
- Members: John 5 Joe Grah; Charles Lee Salvaggio; Glendon Crain
- Past members: Elias "Bones" Andra
- Website: myspace.com/loserhq

Loser was an American alternative rock band which was active from 2005 to 2006.

Current Mötley Crüe guitarist John 5 formed Loser along with his friend and producer Bob Marlette. Marlette recommended Texas singer Joe Grah, who had already had success fronting the Texas alternative rock group Jibe, as a potential vocalist for the band. John flew to Texas to see Jibe in concert and immediately invited Grah to join. The group recruited fellow Texas musician Charles Lee Salvaggio on bass, as well as former The Feds drummer Glendon Crain. With the lineup secured, Loser began working on their debut album Just Like You. The band played its first show in Hollywood, California on June 9, 2005.

The name Loser came about as a reaction to John 5's past:

I was from Grosse Pointe, Michigan, which is kind of an upper-class area, and I was always that rock kid. . . . I started playing guitar at age 7. I always had a rock shirt on, and I had that tattoo early on. I looked like a loser because everyone around me was wearing Polo and Brooks Brothers. But now if you go into a club wearing Polo, you're called a loser. So I think everyone can relate to that name, and the album title, Just Like You, sums it up.

When questioned in an interview regarding the band's sound, John 5 replied, "It is just great rock music. It is kinda like the Foo Fighters, Queens of the Stone Age, new-age stuff."

The band had initial success not long after signing with Island Records, when their song "Nobody Knows" was added to active rock radio nationwide and their track "Disposable Sunshine" was included on the 2005 Fantastic Four soundtrack. During the recording of the soundtrack, however, Crain briefly left the band and was replaced by drummer Elias Andra, a friend of Salvaggio's. Andra had had some success himself with the industrial metal band Psycho Plague, his own creation, which toured with Linkin Park. However, Andra soon left after promotional shots had been taken, and Crain returned. In 2006 Loser was the opening act on Staind's Chapter V tour, along with Theory of a Deadman.

Loser was set to release its debut album, Just Like You, on May 9, 2006 on Island/Def Jam Recordings. At the same time, John 5 was also working for Rob Zombie, and a conflict arose. As Zombie was also touring, John 5 tried to find a live replacement for himself while Loser was touring on conflicting dates. With promo material for the debut album already out and a release date in the bag, Island Records decided it didn't like the idea of Loser without John 5, and dropped the band from the label.

"Being the founding member of Loser, my decision to leave was not an easy one", said John 5 in a press release. "I've been juggling two careers, both with Loser and Rob Zombie, for over one year now. I found it impossible to be in two places at once."

Since the dissolution of Loser, Joe Grah reformed his Dallas band Jibe for an album and multiple tours, and released sixteen solo singles with accompanying videos. Charles Lee Salvaggio later went on to play bass in Filter, Theory Of A Deadman, and guitar in Gemini Syndrome and Black Sunshine, and also teamed with Joe Grah on the project I Am The Wolf. Andra is now the drummer of bands Julien-K and Dead by Sunrise. Glendon Crain went on to join Godhead and later Hollywood Undead. In 2024, Joe officially joins forces with his long-time friend and collaborator Charles Lee Salvaggio to form the hard rock group Inside The Trojan Horse. With Charles on bass and guitar, along with Red Sun Rising and The Violent drummer Pat Gerasia, the band recorded an entire album of material. The group's first single and video, Burn, debuted Wednesday, August 7, 2024. The trio premiered the video for their second single, Savior, on I'm Music Magazine Friday, September 13, 2024. On Friday, October 30, 2024, KRAVE Rock Radio premiered ITTH's third single and video, How They Run. On Friday, November 22, 2024, BleachedBangs Magazine premiered the power-trio's fourth single and video, Stay Alive. On Christmas morning, Wednesday, December 25, 2024, the trio debuted their fifth single and video, Blood and Teeth, on Youtube. The trio launched their second EP, Origins, on Friday, May 23, 2025, featuring the songs Dogs, Fifteen, and Children. A self-directed music video debuted on YouTube the same day.

In spite of Loser's album Just Like You being completed, Island Records decided not to commercially release the album. However, a limited number of promotional copies had been sent to radio stations and music critics. These rare physical copies of the album have become sought-after collector's items among fans.As of 2026 "Just Like You" is available on all streaming services and includes b-sides and rarities.

== Discography ==
Just Like You (2006)
No.	Title	Length
1.	"The First Time"	3:25
2.	"Away"	2:51
3.	"5 A.M."	3:50
4.	"Nobody Knows"	3:46
5.	"Disposable Sunshine"	3:27
6.	"Down"	3:24
7.	"Without You (Inside Out)"	2:59
8.	"Girl Like You"	3:15
9.	"By My Side"	4:22
10.	"Faithless"	3:11
11.	"Love"	4:29

B-sides (2006)
No.	Title	Length
1.	"I'll Find You"	3:17
2.	"Beautiful"	4:10
3.	"5 AM Acoustic"	3:59

== Band members ==
- Joe Grah – lead vocals, songwriter
- John5 – guitar, songwriter
- Charles Lee Salvaggio – bass
- Glendon Crain – drums
- Bob Marlette – producer, engineer, mixer, songwriter
