= Inside The Trojan Horse =

American hard rock trio

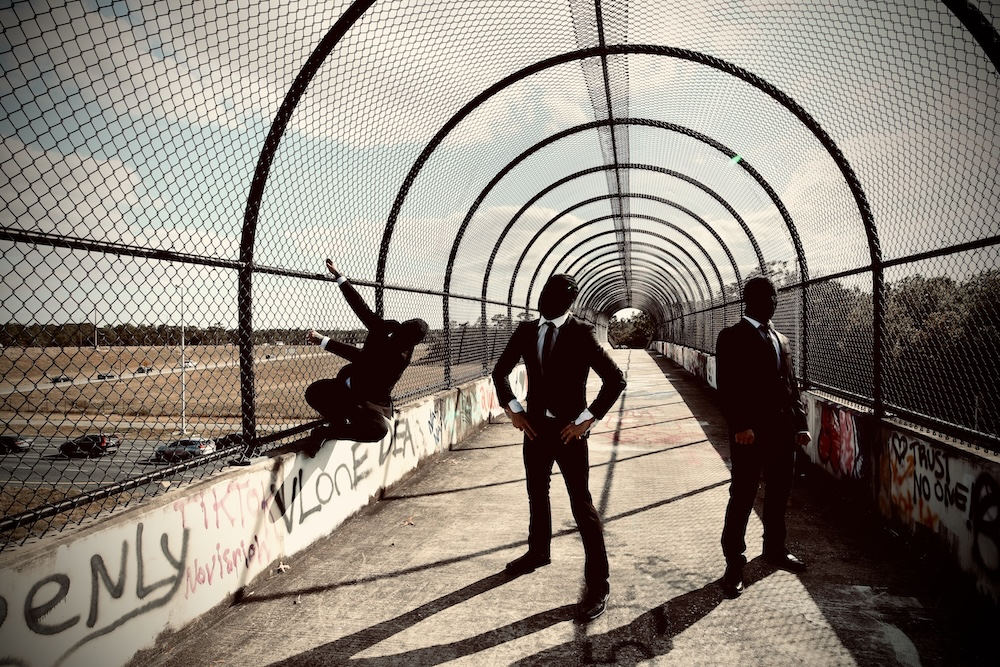
- Inside The Trojan Horse 2024.

Background information
- Origin: Los Angeles, California, U.S
- Genres: Hard rock Punk; Metal
- Years active: 2024 - present
- Label: Sixtyfouronthefloor
- Members: Joe Grah; Charles Lee Salvaggio; Pat Gerasia
- Website: www.insidethetrojanhorse.com

Inside The Trojan Horse is an American Hard rock trio composed of Jibe lead singer and solo artist Joe Grah, Gemini Syndrome guitarist Filter, and Theory Of A Deadman bassist Charles Salvaggio, along with Red Sun Rising and The Violent drummer Pat Gerasia. The band members have chosen to perform under the stage monikers NoOne, NoThing, and NoBody, wearing faceless balaclava masks.

Joe and Charles met and began writing and recording while in the band Loser alongside guitarist John 5 of Mötley Crüe. While on tour with Gemini Syndrome, Charles crossed paths with Pat, and as he and Joe sowed the early seeds of Inside The Trojan Horse, they reached out to the drummer to round out the lineup.

== Band history ==
=== EP1 ITTH (2024) ===
Inside The Trojan Horse released their first EP entitled ITTH as individual singles over five months. The video for the first track, Burn, premiered on Wednesday, August 7, 2024, on Bravewords. The video for the trio's sophomore effort, Savior, premiered on Friday, September 13, 2024, with I'm Music Magazine. On Wednesday, October 30. 2024 Krave Rock Radio premiered the video for ITTH's third single, How They Run On Friday, November 22, 2024, the band premiered the video for their fourth single, Stay Alive, with Bleach Bangs Magazine. The video for the fifth and final installment, Blood and Teeth, premiered on YouTube on Wednesday, December 25, 2024.

=== EP2 Origins (2025) ===
The trio released their second EP, Origins, on Friday, May 23, 2025. It features the tracks Dogs, Fifteen, and Children, with a self-directed music video for Dogs premiering on YouTube concurrently.

== Band members ==
- Joe Grah – Vocals, lyrics, songwriter, producer
- Charles Lee Salvaggio – Guitar, bass, songwriter, producer
- Pat Gerasia – drums

== Discography ==
=== Singles ===
- Burn (2024)
- Savior (2024)
- How They Run (2024
- Stay Alive (2024)
- Blood and Teeth (2024)
- Dogs (2025)
- Children (2025)
