= Jibe (band) =

American rock band

JIBE
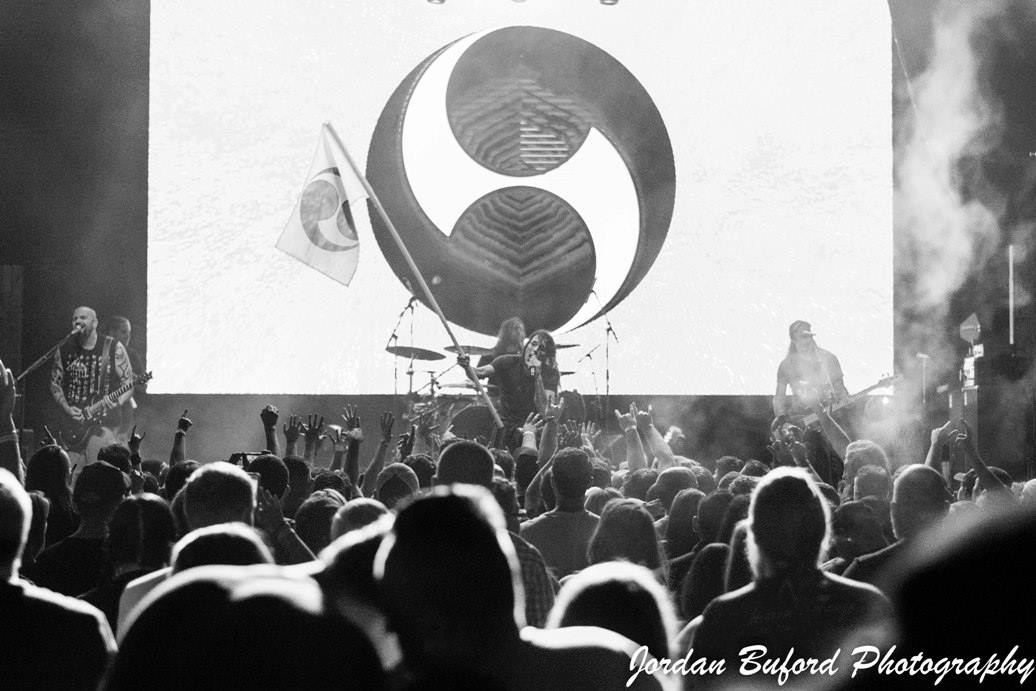
- Jibe on stage September 25, 2015

Background information
- Origin: Dallas, Texas
- Genres: Alternative rock, Psychedelic rock, Hard rock, Post-grunge
- Years active: 1994–2004, 2015-present
- Labels: Sixtyfouronthefloor; Screamin' Aardvark Records; 226 Records
- Members: Joe Grah; Toby Bittenbender; Ben Jeffries; Corey Tatro
- Past members: Sean Robinson; Todd Harwell
- Website: jibeonline.com

JIBE is an alternative rock band from Dallas, Texas best known for their song "Yesterday’s Gone" from their 2003 album Uprising. Initially active from 1994 to 2004, they reformed in 2015 and released their fourth studio album Epic Tales of Human Nature in 2017.

== Band history ==
Jibe began in late 1993 after friends Joe Grah and Toby Bittenbender met bassist Sean Robinson while working at Guitar Center in Dallas, Texas. Drummer Ben Jeffries joined the other members upon moving to Dallas in February 1994. Jibe played their first show at a club called “The Basement” in Dallas in April 1994. The group soon became known for their energetic and intense live shows and relentless touring schedule, playing well over a thousand concerts in their first five years. Jibe released their first album, a live concert recorded at Trees in Dallas, in 1994. The self-titled LP Jibe followed in 1996.

The band received their first taste of success in 2000 with their single "I’ll Meet You Halfway" from their second studio album In My Head, which reached the #1 spot on college radio stations in Texas and Louisiana. Although compared by the press to classic rock acts such as James Gang and Led Zeppelin, the band also cited contemporaries such as Soundgarden, Smashing Pumpkins, and Jane’s Addiction as the influences on their developing sound. In My Head also featured a notable rap rock influence, which drew comparisons to Kid Rock, Limp Bizkit, and Rage Against the Machine.

In 2003 Jibe released their third album Uprising. The single "Yesterday’s Gone" received significant national airplay and spent nine weeks in the top 30 on the national rock chart, peaking at #26. The song soared to #1 at radio stations in Dallas, Austin, and Shreveport, and reached the top 10 at dozens of stations across Texas, Oklahoma, and Louisiana and made the top 20 in several other markets nationwide. "Yesterday’s Gone" charted at #71 on Radio & Records year-end list of the top 100 rock tracks of 2003 and was chosen by the Dallas Cowboys as the music bed for their 2003 season. The song "Hypocrite" was also featured in an episode of the TV series One Tree Hill. Uprising was also a critical success, earning awards for alternative album of the year, male vocalist of the year, producer of the year, and song of the year at the 2003 KEGL local show awards.

Jibe quickly found themselves in high demand as an opening act for popular nationally touring post-grunge rock acts of the day such as Creed, Toadies, Fastball, Staind, Sevendust, Shinedown, Seether, Saliva, Ours, Oleander, Lit, Blue October, and Our Lady Peace. Jibe toured with Nickelback, Jerry Cantrell, Josh Todd, Kings of Leon and Marilyn Manson and established themselves as one of the premier rock bands in the Dallas scene.

== Breakup and hiatus ==
After playing over 2,500 concerts, Jibe suddenly broke up in June 2004, much to the dismay of their fans. According to the Dallas Observer, the band seemed to be “perpetually perched on fame’s doorstep” and after the success of their most recent album, by all accounts were “on their way up”. According to Jibe frontman Joe Grah, one night he simply got in his car and drove to Los Angeles and didn't tell anyone for three days. During his time in Jibe, Grah had become addicted to drugs and alcohol and believes that if he hadn't left Dallas and broken up the band, he probably would have died.

After leaving Jibe, singer Joe Grah joined the band Loser in Los Angeles, which also featured guitarist John 5. Loser was signed to Island Records and recorded the album Just Like You in 2006. Following the dissolution of Loser, Grah fronted the bands South of Earth and I Am The Wolf. He also formed the electronic rock project Dead Girls Don't Lie.

Ben Jeffries drummed for the band The Feds from 2004 to 2008 before leaving the band to attend college.

Toby Bittenbender joined Zayra Alvarez’s backing band and played on her 2006 album Ruleta. Later he played with Dallas rock band Overscene.

Corey Tatro played bass in the metal band DownLo, and also plays lead guitar in the Whiskey River Ramblers.

== Legacy ==
Jibe is recognized within the Dallas scene. The legacy of the band is inextricably tied to the Deep Ellum music scene of the 1990s and early 2000s. Along with other prominent Dallas bands such as Tripping Daisy, The Toadies, Drowning Pool, SouthFM, Flickerstick, Edgewater, Old 97's, Slow Roosevelt and Reverend Horton Heat, Jibe are considered as standard-bearers of a bygone era when rock fans packed the clubs of Deep Ellum.

== Reunion (2015–2018) ==
Jibe played their first concert in eleven years on September 25, 2015 at Gas Monkey Bar N' Grill in Dallas. The show was free, but required tickets which could be reserved at Dallas rock radio station KDGE’s website. The tickets sold out in less than ten hours, and the concert was moved to a larger venue, where tickets again quickly sold out. In 2016 the band wrote and recorded a new album, Epic Tales of Human Nature with producer Matt Noveskey and mixer Toby Wright. The first single from the album ,"We've Only Just Begun", was released November 8, 2016. The full album was released to fans who pre-ordered on June 9, 2017, and had a wider release on October 6, 2017. Along with the new album, Jibe also released a collection of B-sides and rarities. The second single from the album, "Release" soon followed, and proved to be a radio hit, peaking at #42 on the mediabase active rock chart in March 2018. With Jibe's resurgence in full swing, the band joined Theory of a Deadman on a gulf coast tour in the summer of 2018, and headlined their own west coast tour in August. On September 26, Jibe opened for Slash at the House of Blues in Houston. Jibe was invited to join Candlebox's Fall 2018 tour, but had to cancel after Joe Grah was seriously injured in a head-on collision while riding his motorcycle in Hollywood on October 8, 2018. Grah made a full recovery, and wrote new songs throughout 2019, but Jibe has not played a live show since the accident.

== Since ==
In September 2019, following his months-long recovery from the motorcycle accident, Joe Grah began releasing a series of new solo songs he self-produced, working with mixer Evan Rodinache (Flyleaf, Escape the Fate, Powerman 5000). On Friday, May 24, 2024, Joe releases his fifteenth single and video, Atypical, a powerful, raw, and unplugged acoustic anthem written and recorded on his birthday in March of this year. In 2024, Joe officially joins forces with his long-time friend and collaborator Gemini Syndrome guitarist Charles Lee Salvaggio, who has also previously played bass in Filter and Theory Of A Deadman, to form the hard rock group Inside The Trojan Horse. With Charles on bass and guitar, along with Red Sun Rising and The Violent drummer Pat Gerasia, the band recorded an entire album of material. The group's first single and video, Burn, debuted Wednesday, August 7. The trio premiered the video for their second single, Savior, on I'm Music Magazine Friday September 13, 2024. On Friday, October 30, 2024, Krave Rock Radio premiered ITTH's third single, How They Run. On Friday, November 22, 2024, BleachedBangs Magazine premiered the power-trio's fourth single and video, Stay Alive. On Christmas morning, Wednesday, December 25, 2024, the trio premiered their fifth single and video, Blood and Teeth, on Youtube. The trio released their second EP, Origins, on Friday, May 23, 2025. It features the tracks Dogs, Fifteen, and Children, with a self-directed music video for Dogs premiering on YouTube concurrently.

== Band members ==
Current

- Joe Grah – lead vocals (1993–2004, 2015–present)
- Toby Bittenbender – guitars (1993–2004, 2015–present)
- Corey Tatro – bass (1998–2004, 2015–present)
- Todd Harwell – drums (2017–present)

Former

- Sean Robinson – bass (1993-1998)
- Ben Jeffries – drums (1993-2004, 2015–2017)

== Discography ==
=== Studio albums ===
- Jibe (1996)
- In My Head (2000)
- Uprising (2003)
- Epic Tales of Human Nature (2017)

=== Live albums ===
- Live at Trees (1994)
