= Joe Grah =

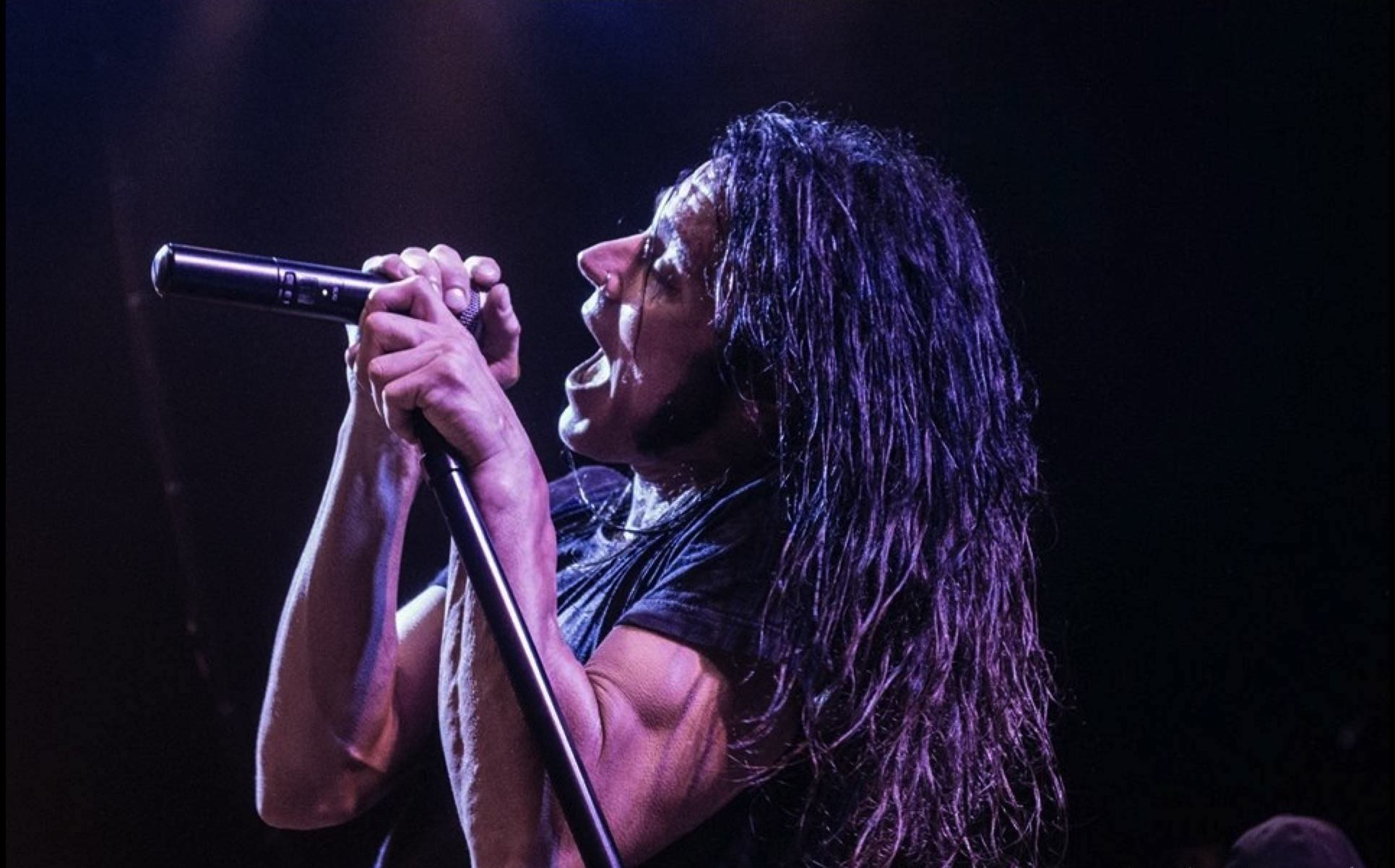
- Grah performing live at Gas Monkey Live, Dallas, August 2018

Background information
- Born: Joseph Richard Grah; March 23, 1971 (age 55); Philadelphia, Pennsylvania, U.S.
- Genres: Alt-rock, hard rock, post-grunge
- Occupations: Singer, songwriter, multi-instrumentalist, producer
- Years active: 1994–present
- Label: Sixtyfouronthefloor Records
- Member of: Inside The Trojan Horse, Jibe
- Formerly of: Loser, South of Earth
- Website: joegrah.com

Joseph Richard Grah (born March 23, 1971) is an American singer, songwriter, multi-instrumentalist, and record producer. He is best known as a solo emotional alt-rock artist whose music explores themes of isolation, reflection, resilience, and breaking free, and as the frontman of the hard rock trio Inside The Trojan Horse.

Grah first rose to prominence in the 1990s as the lead vocalist and frontman of the Dallas alt-rock band Jibe, which achieved national radio airplay and Billboard chart success with singles such as "Yesterday's Gone" and "Release". He later performed with the Island Def Jam project Loser (alongside guitarist John 5) and the band South of Earth (with Geno Lenardo of Filter).

Since late 2019, Grah has released 17 solo singles under Sixtyfouronthefloor Records, all accompanied by official music videos. His solo music is characterized by raw vocals, heavy riffs, soaring melodies, and atmospheric textures. Notable solo releases include "Far" (2026), "Notice" (2025), "Sweet Decay" (his most-streamed track), "Runaway", and "2nite".

== Career ==
=== Jibe and early bands ===
Grah gained early recognition in the 1990s as the lead singer and frontman of the Dallas-based alt-rock band Jibe. The band released four albums: Jibe Live at Trees (1994, 8 songs recorded live at Trees in Dallas), the self-titled Jibe (1996, 11 songs), In My Head (2000, 12 songs), and Uprising (2003, 12 songs). The single "Yesterday's Gone" from Uprising reached #1 on KEGL, KDGE, and KXKX and spent nine weeks in the top 30 on the national rock chart.

He later joined the Island Def Jam project Loser alongside guitarist John 5 and contributed to South of Earth with Geno Lenardo of Filter.

=== Solo career ===
In late 2019, Grah began focusing on his solo work, releasing music from his home studio in Florida under Sixtyfouronthefloor Records. He has released 17 solo singles to date, each accompanied by an official music video. His solo material blends emotional alt-rock with heavy riffs, soaring melodies, and atmospheric textures, frequently addressing themes of isolation, reflection, resilience, and breaking free.

Key solo releases include "Far" (2026), "Notice" (2025), "Sweet Decay" (his most-streamed solo track), "Runaway", "2nite", "In a Place Where Nothing Lives", "Atypical", "Stone Face", and "Pure".

=== Inside The Trojan Horse ===
Grah currently fronts the hard rock trio Inside The Trojan Horse, with guitarist Charles Lee Salvaggio (Gemini Syndrome) and drummer Pat Gerasia (Red Sun Rising). The band released its material as stand-alone singles with accompanying music videos before compiling them into EPs. The ITTH singles ("Burn", "Savior", "How They Run", "Stay Alive", and "Blood and Teeth") were released in 2025, followed by the Origins EP featuring "Dogs", "Fifteen", and "Children" (with "Dogs" released as a single with a video).

== Discography ==
=== Solo singles ===
Grah has released 17 solo singles since late 2019 under Sixtyfouronthefloor Records. All 17 singles were released with accompanying official music videos.

Notable solo singles include:

- "Who Ya Dyin' For" (2019)
- "Tidal Wave" (2019)
- "2nite" (2019)
- "Parts + Pieces" (2020)
- "The Great Unknown" (2020)
- "Runaway" (2020)
- "In a Place Where Nothing Lives" (2020)
- "Blue" (2020)
- "Sweet Decay" (2021) – his most-streamed solo track
- "Chemicals & Doctrines" (2022)
- "Summer Game" (2022)
- "Down by the Lake" (2022)
- "Pure" (2023)
- "Stone Face" (2023)
- "Atypical" (2024)
- "Notice" (2025)
- "Far" (2026)

=== Inside The Trojan Horse ===
Grah fronts the hard rock trio Inside The Trojan Horse. The band released its material as stand-alone singles with accompanying music videos before compiling them into EPs.

==== ITTH singles (2025) ====
- "Burn" (2025)
- "Savior" (2025)
- "How They Run" (2025)
- "Stay Alive" (2025)
- "Blood and Teeth" (2025)

==== Origins EP (2025) ====
- "Dogs" (2025) – released as a single with music video
- "Fifteen" (2025)
- "Children" (2025)

=== With Jibe ===
- Jibe Live at Trees (1994) – 8 songs recorded live at Trees in Dallas
- Jibe (self-titled, 1996) – 11 songs
- In My Head (2000) – 12 songs
- Uprising (2003) – 12 songs, featuring the single "Yesterday's Gone", which reached #1 on KEGL, KDGE, and KXKX and spent nine weeks in the top 30 on the national rock chart.
- Epic Tales of Human Nature (2017) – 13-track album featuring the single "Release", which charted on Billboard's Top 50.

=== With Loser ===
- Just Like You (2006)

=== With South of Earth ===
- South of Earth (2008)

=== Music videos ===
All 17 of Grah's solo singles released since late 2019 have been accompanied by official music videos. The videos typically employ raw, intimate, and cinematic visuals that reflect the emotional and introspective themes of the songs, often filmed in Florida with moody, late-night aesthetics.

Grah has also appeared in music videos from his earlier bands, including "Yesterday's Gone" and "Release" (Jibe), "We've Only Just Begun" (Jibe), "God 2 Get Down" (South of Earth), and "The First Time" (Loser).

Grah's work with Inside The Trojan Horse has been supported by music videos for every stand-alone single from the ITTH singles ("Burn", "Savior", "How They Run", "Stay Alive", "Blood and Teeth" in 2025) and the Origins EP ("Dogs" in 2025).

== Personal life ==
Grah was born on March 23, 1971, in Philadelphia, Pennsylvania. He currently resides in Florida, where he operates a home studio. He has been open about surviving a house fire and a life-altering accident, experiences that have influenced the introspective and resilient themes in his solo music.
