= Black Sunshine (band) =

- Genre: Hard rock
- Years active: 2009–2014, 2019-2024
- Label: BreakSilence Recordings
- Past members: Matt Reardon; Charles Lee; Christopher Serafini; Matt 'Toast' Young; Jave 'The Wave' Patterson 'Mad' Mike Reynolds; Spyder

Black Sunshine is a band formed and fronted by extreme sports athlete Matt Reardon and former Loser band bass guitarist Charles Lee Salvaggio. The band was originally going to release their debut self-titled album on April 13, 2010, but it was delayed to be released on May 25, 2010.

While recuperating from surgeries related to a ski accident, extreme sports athlete Matthew Reardon took time off to recuperate and turned to songwriting. Deciding to form a band to complete the sound of these songs, guitarist John 5 introduced Reardon to his previous band-mate from Loser, guitarist Charles Lee. Lee, along with bassist Christopher Serafini and drummer Matt 'Toast' Young, came together to complete the band. The band worked with producer Bob Marlette (Filter, Lynyrd Skynyrd) on the album, with him playing instruments on several songs as well.

The album produced one single "Once In My Life", which cracked the Active Rock Top 40, higher than singles from bands such as Nickelback and Atreyu and hit #31 on the Mainstream Rock chart.

The band toured in support of the album with Hinder and My Darkest Days throughout 2010, with their September 8, 2010 concert being streamed online.

== Discography ==
Studio albums

- Black Sunshine (2010)
