= Messer (band) =

American rock band

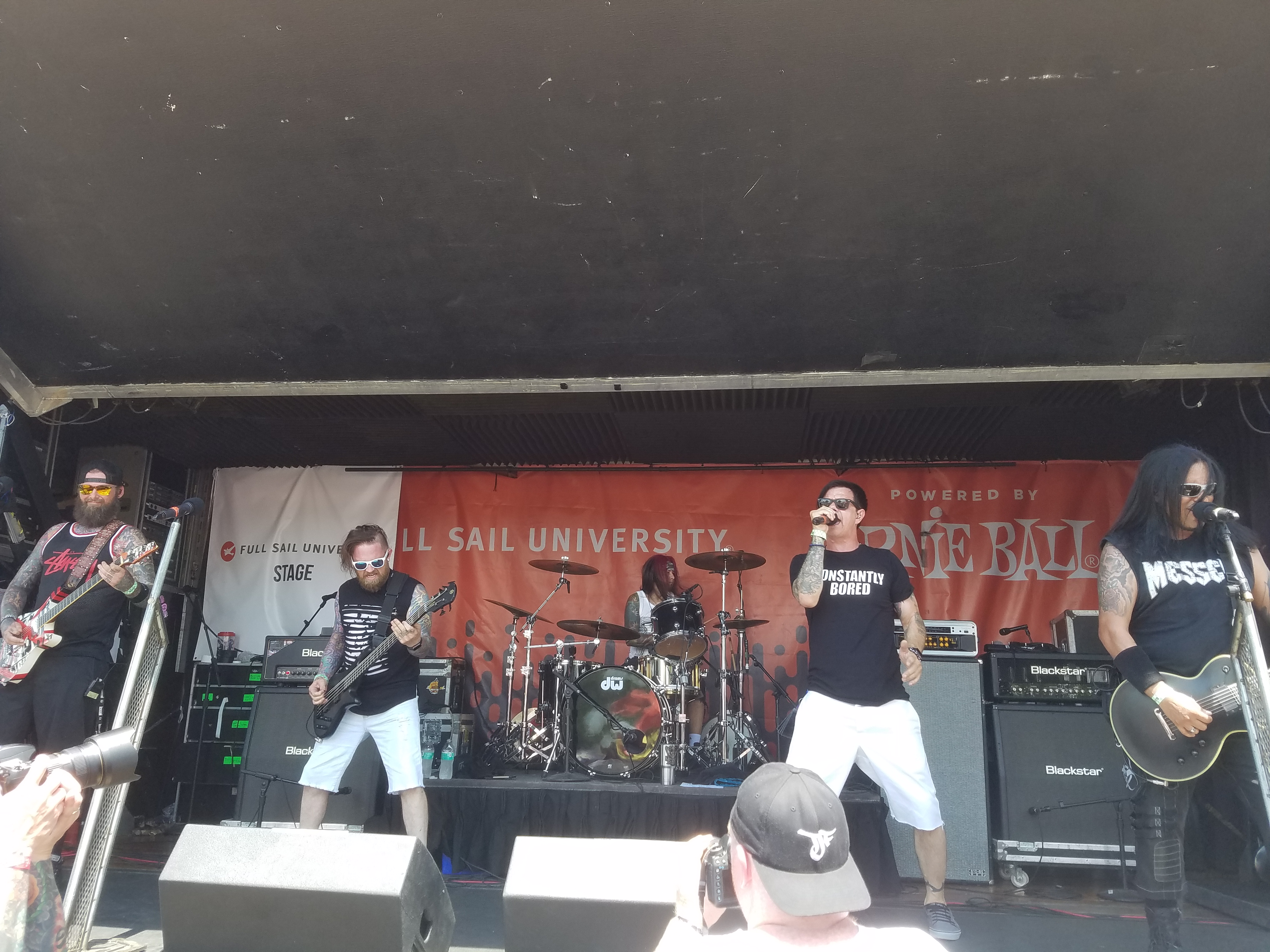
- Messer performing in 2018

Background information
- Origin: Dallas, Texas, U.S.
- Genres: Hard rock
- Years active: 2010–present
- Label: MaddPants
- Members: Dereak Messer; Maddox Messer; Kenny Youngar; Jonathan Simmons
- Past members: Donnie DeVille; Javier Contreras
- Website: messerband.com

Messer is an American hard rock band from Dallas, Texas. Formed in 2009, they have released three singles, including "Simple Man", "Whiskey" and "Make This Life", in addition to their self-titled debut studio album in 2018.

== History ==
=== Beginnings (2009–2013) ===
During lead vocalist Dereak Messer's high-school career in Iowa, he performed with local bands. After high school, the singer moved to Dallas to engage in a professional music career. Upon Dereak's move to Texas, he met Javier Contreras, who performed in bands named Mudflap and Pimpadelic. When looking for a hair stylist, Dereak entered bassist Maddox Messer's Hair salon, at which time they began to talk about music. During drummer Kenny Youngar's drive from Canada to Arizona, his automobile malfunctioned near Dallas. Youngar ended up spending the night, and joined a band named Strangleweed (who made an appearance on Eye for an Eye). After the band heard about this, Kenny was invited to join the group. Following the formation of the quartet, tattoo artist Donnie DeVille and the ensemble exchanged music after which time DeVille rounded out the quintet.

While touring with a multitude of notable music ensembles, the group caught the eye of music producer Chad Gendason, who produced the debut album from the group.

=== Self-titled debut album and Make This Life Tour (2013–2018) ===
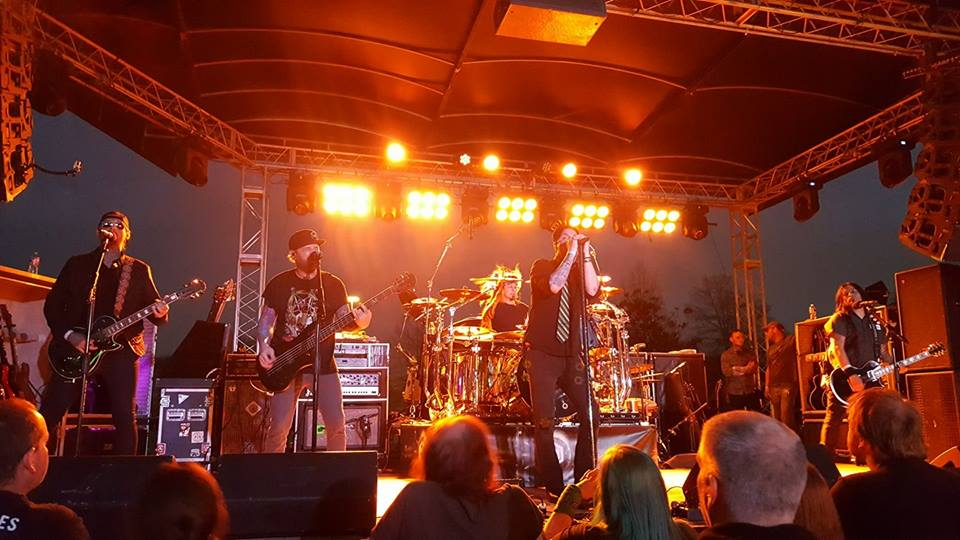
Messer performing in 2018

In 2013, the group released two singles entitled "Whisky" and "Simple Man". Just under five years later, in January 2018, the ensemble released "Make This Life", the debut single from their self-titled album. In early April 2018, "Make This Life" peaked at Number 28 on Billboard Mainstream Rock Songs.

In March and April 2018, the ensemble toured with Lacey Sturm, Red and Righteous Vendetta.

On April 20, 2018, the group released via MaddPants Records their self-titled debut studio album, produced by Chad Gendason.

In June 2018, the quintet traveled the southwestern United States in support of their Make This Life Tour, with three July stops in Texas to perform on the 2018 Vans Warped Tour.

On August 7, 2018, the band released their music video for "Save Myself", the second single from their self-titled album. In late August 2018, the group plans to perform throughout the United States with American heavy metal band Gemini Syndrome.

In October and November 2018, the group toured with American rock bands Royal Bliss and Joyous Wolf.

In January 2019, the ensemble filmed their music video for "Simple Man", one of the two first singles from their debut album. In April 2019, the group plans to perform multiple shows with Pop Evil and Memphis May Fire, followed by a mid 2019 United States tour with Scott Stapp of American rock band Creed.

== Reception ==
Regarding "Make This Life", Megan Buck of Shockwave Magazine stated that: "This fist-raising single will get your head nodding long before it's finished" and that it "provides a vivid and infectious sound that leaves you in high anticipation of the album to follow". Buck goes on to state that the tune is a "kick-starter of a single" that "draws you in with a little 'unce-unce', reminiscent of Nine Inch Nails, however, the similarities end when the first verse lands". The author continues indicating that the two aforementioned songs "are the anathema-tic attention grabbers".

== Members ==
- Dereak Messer – vocals
- Maddox Messer – bass
- Kenny Youngar – drums
- Jonathan Simmons – guitar, vocals

=== Past members ===
- Javier Contreras – lead guitar
- Donnie Deville – rhythm guitar

== Discography ==
=== Studio albums ===
- Messer (2018)

=== Singles ===
List of singles as lead artist, showing year released and album name
Title	Year	Peak chart positions	Album
Title	Year	US Main.	Album
"Simple Man"	2016	23	Messer
"Whiskey"	2016	—	Messer
"Make This Life"	2018	28	Messer
"Save Myself"	2018	28	Messer
"Hope in This World"	2022	36	TBA
"Unbreakable (Unfvckwitable)"	2022	31	TBA
"Find Out"	2024	37	TBA

=== Music videos ===
List of music videos, showing year released and directors
Title	Year	Director(s)
"Make This Life"	2018	Matthew JC
"Save Myself"	2018	TimeKeeper Media
"Simple Man"	2019	TimeKeeper Media
"Fight of My Life"	2019	Matthew JC
"Everything Beautiful"	2021	DeadEyesArt
"Hope in This World"	2022	Matthew JC
"Unbreakable (Unfvckwitable)"	2022	Matthew JC
"Cuts Like a Knife"	2023	Maddox Messer
"Lay Down Your Heart"	2023	Unknown
"One More Time"	2024	Unknown
"Throw It Away"	2024	Unknown
"Find Out"	2024	Unknown
