= Lux (Gemini Syndrome album) =

Studio album by Gemini Syndrome
- Released: September 10, 2013
- Genre: Alternative metal, nu metal
- Length: 43:53
- Label: Warner Bros.
- Producer: Kevin Churko

Gemini Syndrome chronology
Lux (2013)	Memento Mori (2016)

Singles from Lux
- 1. "Pleasure and Pain" Released: December 7, 2012; 2. "Left of Me" Released: March 1, 2013; 3. "Basement" Released: March 22, 2013; 4. "Stardust" Released: July 19, 2013

Professional ratings
Review scores
Source	Rating
AllMusic	3.5/5 stars

Lux is the debut studio album from American alternative metal band Gemini Syndrome. It was released on September 10, 2013, through Warner Bros. Records. "Pleasure and Pain", "Basement", "Left of Me," and "Stardust" have all been released as singles. The final single "Stardust" peaked at No. 19 on the Mainstream Rock Tracks chart in the US. "Basement," "Resurrection," "Take This," and "Syndrome" were all previously released on the rare EP they released in January 2011.

== Reception ==
The album peaked at No. 3 on the Top Heatseekers charts.

== Song Meanings ==
Aaron Nordstrom on Basement: "Basement is pretty personal. That's just blatant discussion of me being the teenager with Albinism and my conversation with God at the time and being angry about it, not trying - not really understanding where I fit in in society in my peer group. [...] It was a working title at beginning, but it kinda worked out in a sense that as a kid, and even if I could now, I would, I always lived in the basement because it was darker. I'm photosensitive, being Albino, so it was always darker."

Aaron Nordstrom on Mourning Star: "I wrote that at really stressful time of my life. It's not directly related to anything I was going through necessarily at the time. That song is more of a diatribe about the fall of Lucifer from heaven and in that sense of metaphor for everybody's kinda battle with their own faith in, I don't want to say God necessarily, but you know, their place in the universe and your purpose for being here. I went through a very, very emotional point when I was writing that song. That was a really heavy emotional time for me to put on paper."

== Track listing ==
All tracks are written by Gemini Syndrome.

No.	Title	Length
1.	"Pleasure and Pain"	4:17
2.	"Basement"	3:11
3.	"Falling Apart"	3:36
4.	"Resurrection"	3:54
5.	"Stardust"	3:48
6.	"Mourning Star"	4:36
7.	"Left of Me"	3:06
8.	"Pay for This"	3:38
9.	"Take This"	5:05
10.	"Babylon"	3:15
11.	"Syndrome"	3:33
12.	"Lux"	1:56
Total length:		43:53

== Personnel ==
=== Musicians ===
- Aaron Nordstrom - lead vocals
- Rich Juzwick - guitars, backing vocals
- Mike Salerno - guitars, backing vocals
- Alessandro Paveri - bass
- Brian Steele Medina - drums
