= Polyester Zeal =

Studio album by Red Sun Rising
- Released: August 7, 2015
- Studio: The Blue Room (Woodland Hills, Los Angeles)
- Genre: Hard rock, post-grunge
- Length: 42:45
- Label: Razor & Tie
- Producer: Bob Marlette

Red Sun Rising studio album chronology
| Making of Kings (2011) | Polyester Zeal (2015) | Thread (2018) |

Singles from Polyester Zeal
- 1. "The Otherside" Released: August 7, 2015; 2. "Emotionless" Released: January 4, 2016; 3. "Amnesia" Released: May 25, 2016

Polyester Zeal is the major label debut studio album by the American rock band Red Sun Rising. It was released on August 7, 2015 by Razor & Tie. The album peaked outside the top 40 on the US Billboard Rock Albums chart and spawned five singles (three official and two promotional): "The Otherside", "Emotionless", "Amnesia", "Push" and "Unnatural". To promote the record, Red Sun Rising opened for other rock bands on their respective tours.

== Background ==
Mike Protich explained that the album's title came from "the juxtaposition of what's cheap/obtainable (polyester) and what we strive for or what our goals may be (zeal)", and carried stories about "past life experiences," the band's journey towards the album's creation, and "nostalgic scenes" that made them who they are.

== Promotion ==
On May 16, 2016, the band was announced alongside Pop Evil as supporting acts for 3 Doors Down's summer-fall tour supporting their sixth album Us and the Night, starting on August 26 at Charleston's Municipal Auditorium and finishing on November 12 at Harrah's Cherokee Casino Resort. On January 10, 2017, the band was announced alongside Badflower as opening acts for Pop Evil's Rock 'N Roll Now Tour: Right Now, beginning in Louisville's Mercury Ballroom and finishing at the Dreammakers Theater in Sault Ste. Marie.

== Track listing ==
All tracks are written by Mike Protich and Ryan Williams.

| No. | Title | Length |
|---|---|---|
| 1. | "Push" | 3:28 |
| 2. | "Amnesia" | 3:30 |
| 3. | "The Otherside" | 3:36 |
| 4. | "My Muse" | 3:39 |
| 5. | "Emotionless" | 4:22 |
| 6. | "Blister" | 3:58 |
| 7. | "Worlds Away" | 4:30 |
| 8. | "Unnatural" | 3:58 |
| 9. | "Awake" | 3:55 |
| 10. | "Bliss" | 3:47 |
| 11. | "Imitation" | 4:02 |
| Total length: | | 42:45 |

== Personnel ==
Adapted credits from the liner notes of Polyester Zeal.

Red Sun Rising

- Mike Protich - lead vocals, guitar
- Tyler Valendza - rhythm guitar
- Ryan Williams - lead guitar
- Ricky Miller - bass, backing vocals
- Pat Gerasia - drums

Additional musician

- Chris Marlette - drums

Production

- George Cappellini Jr. - executive producer
- Mike Gitter - A&R
- Douglas M. Granger - album art
- Paul Loous - mastering
- Bob Marlette - producer, engineer, mixing

== Charts ==
| Chart (2015) | Peak position |
|---|---|
| US Top Rock Albums (Billboard) | 41 |
| US Top Hard Rock Albums (Billboard) | 11 |
| US Heatseekers Albums (Billboard) | 7 |
