= Thread (album) =

Studio album by Red Sun Rising
- Released: March 30, 2018
- Recorded: 2017
- Studios: Sonic Ranch (Tornillo, Texas); Hideaway Studios (Los Angeles)
- Genres: Alternative rock, hard rock
- Length: 48:16
- Label: Razor & Tie
- Producer: Matt Hyde

Red Sun Rising studio album chronology
Polyester Zeal (2015)	Thread (2018)

Singles from Thread
- 1. "Deathwish" Released: January 11, 2018; 2. "Veins" Released: July 31, 2018; 3. "Lonely Girl" Released: January 22, 2019; 4. "Stealing Life" Released: January 29, 2020

Thread is the second studio album by American rock band Red Sun Rising. It was released on March 30, 2018 by Razor & Tie. The album garnered positive reviews from critics. Thread reached number 21 on the US Billboard Top Hard Rock Albums chart and spawned six singles (four official and two promotional): "Deathwish", "Veins", "Lonely Girl", "Stealing Life", "Fascination" and "Left for Dead".

== Background ==
In an interview with Billboard, lead singer Mike Protich explained that he and the band developed "new skills and musical ambitions" while on tour promoting Polyester Zeal, and wanted to replicate that authentic live sound instead of the "slick production" on their debut record, all while showcasing their evolved songwriting. He added that they went through "different instruments" not found on Polyester Zeal and brought in "different eras [of music] and genres of music" to "create different textures."

== Promotion ==
On March 6, 2018, the band was announced alongside the Fever 333 as opening acts to the Used's spring tour supporting their seventh album The Canyon, beginning with Jacksonville, Florida's Welcome to Rockville festival and finishing at Pryor, Oklahoma's Rocklahoma festival.

The song 'Deathwish' was included in the game Forza Horizon 4's base game soundtrack on the fictional radio station Horizon XS.

== Critical reception ==
Professional ratings
Review scores
Source	Rating
Blabbermouth.net	7.5/10
Ghost Cult Magazine	9.0/10
Melodic	3/5 stars

Keith Chachkes of Ghost Cult Magazine gave the album high praise for having "a masterclass level of songwriting and a clear advance for the band from their last release Polyester Zeal", saying "every song has a style and personality all its own" and has impressive "depth and quality" along with exceptional performances from the band, concluding that: "If you've been hoping that a band would come along and make you feel like your favorite bands used to do, this band just planted itself dead in your path. Rock on!" Jay H. Goriana from Blabbermouth.net gave the band credit for expanding their sound by creating "soothing, feel good alt rock songs" with a more polished production while also displaying their darker side on tracks like "Evil Like You" and "Lonely Girl", concluding that "Invariably, the group naturally shifts into a gear that's undeniably catchy and uplifting. Through and through, Red Sun Rising is continuing to prove its one of rock's new stars." Chad Childers of Loudwire also praised the production work by Matt Hyde and Jay Ruston for providing "a more fleshed-out presentation" of the band that traverses from "melodic gems ("Left for Dead", "Veins")" to tracks that contain a sinister edge ("Fascination", "Deathwish"), saying that Red Sun Rising have "seized the day on Thread, which continues to show promise for a band bringing a little something different to the rock radio world." In a 2023 retrospective review, Johan Wippsson of Melodic felt it was "a simpler and more adapted record where they invested more in strong melodies than a challenging sound", but called it "a good and stable record for anyone who likes Foo Fighters and similar riff based Rock", concluding that: "Overall, this second album by Red Sun Rising is definitely worth checking out. Sure, it's not a classic, but if you like the band mentioned above, you won't be disappointed."

Loudwire placed Thread at number two on their list of the "30 Best Hard Rock Albums of 2018". The website's writer, Chad Childers, said: "'Thread' shows a much more well-rounded representation of who they are" [...] "Red Sun Rising does a solid job of differentiating themselves from the active rock crowd."

== Track listing ==
All tracks are written by Red Sun Rising.

No.	Title	Length
1.	"Fascination"	5:41
2.	"Left for Dead"	3:53
3.	"Deathwish"	4:48
4.	"Stealing Life"	5:05
5.	"El Lazo"	3:40
6.	"Lonely Girl"	4:19
7.	"Veins"	4:17
8.	"Clarity"	4:16
9.	"Benny Two Dogs"	4:09
10.	"Rose"	4:27
11.	"Evil Like You"	3:41
Total length:		48:16

== Personnel ==
Adapted credits from the liner notes of Thread.

Red Sun Rising

- Mike Protich - lead vocals, guitar
- Ryan Williams - lead guitar
- Ricky Miller - bass, backing vocals, keys
- Dave McGarry - rhythm guitar, backing vocals
- Pat Gerasia - drums

Production

- Matt Hyde - producer, engineer
- Jay Ruston - mixer
- Paul Logus - mastering
- Gabriel Esparza - assistant engineer

Artwork

- Mike Cortada - album artwork illustrations
- Shervin Lainez - photography

== Charts ==
Chart (2018)	Peak position
US Top Hard Rock Albums (Billboard)	21
US Heatseekers Albums (Billboard)	3
