= Amnesia (Red Sun Rising song) =

Single by Red Sun Rising

from the album Polyester Zeal
- Released: May 25, 2016
- Recorded: 2015
- Genre: Hard rock, alternative rock
- Length: 3:30
- Label: Razor & Tie
- Songwriters: Ryan Williams; Mike Protich
- Producer: Bob Marlette

Red Sun Rising singles chronology
"Emotionless" (2016)	"Amnesia" (2016)	"Unnatural" (2017)

"Amnesia" is a song by the American rock band Red Sun Rising. It was released on May 25, 2016 on their third album Polyester Zeal as the third single.

== Charts ==
Chart (2016)	Peak position
US Mainstream Rock (Billboard)	8
US Rock & Alternative Airplay (Billboard)	28
