= Door to Door Cannibals =

Single by Chevelle

from the album The North Corridor
- Released: October 3, 2016
- Recorded: 2015–2016
- Genre: Alternative metal
- Length: 4:35
- Label: Epic
- Songwriters: Pete Loeffler; Sam Loeffler
- Producer: Joe Barresi

Chevelle singles chronology
| "Joyride (Omen)" (2016) | "Door to Door Cannibals" (2016) | "Rivers" (2017) |

Music video
- "Door to Door Cannibals" on YouTube

"Door to Door Cannibals" is a song by American rock band Chevelle. It is the opening track on the band's eighth studio album, The North Corridor. The song was released as the second single from the album on October 3, 2016.

== Overview ==
Neil Z. Yeung of AllMusic called the song a "ready-made mosh pit [igniter], propulsive and visceral.

== Music video ==
A music video for the song was released on November 10, 2016, premiering via Bloody Disgusting. According to drummer Sam Loeffler, the band wanted to do a nightmare/horror video for the song, setting it in a mental asylum.

The video begins with Pete Loeffler strapped to a chair in a mental asylum. As he is about to be injected with something he escapes from the chair and runs out of the room. As he runs down the hallway he looks into other rooms, seeing things such as a man banging his head against the door, a man dressed in a bunny suit and a woman with no legs strapped to a walker. Pete runs into the common area, where his brother, Sam, is in a catatonic state. After seeing the band members on a T.V., Pete causes a distraction and tries to escape with Sam as the other patients start to attack the staff. As the two are about to caught by an orderly, Dean comes in and knocks him out. As the video ends, the three exit through a door before cutting to a shot similar to the opening scene, implying the escape was just a dream.

== Charts ==
| Chart (2017) | Peak position |
|---|---|
| US Rock & Alternative Airplay (Billboard) | 39 |
| US Mainstream Rock (Billboard) | 11 |
