= Memento Mori (Gemini Syndrome album) =

Studio album by Gemini Syndrome
- Released: August 19, 2016
- Recorded: 2016
- Length: 51:08
- Label: Another Century
- Producer: Kane and Kevin Churko

Gemini Syndrome chronology
Lux (2013)	Memento Mori (2016)	3rd Degree - The Raising (2021)

Singles from Memento Mori
- 1. "Remember We Die" Released: 2016; 2. "Sorry Not Sorry" Released: 2016

Memento Mori is the second studio album from American alternative metal band Gemini Syndrome. Released on August 19, 2016, the work was published by Another Century Records.

== Track listing ==
No.	Title	Length
1.	"Anonymous"	3:19
2.	"Remember We Die"	3:47
3.	"Zealot"	3:52
4.	"Gravedigger"	4:23
5.	"On Point"	3:24
6.	"La Devastante Veritá"	1:32
7.	"Sorry Not Sorry"	3:37
8.	"Eternity"	3:35
9.	"Alive Inside"	4:21
10.	"Inception"	3:52
11.	"Lucido Somnium"	1:25
12.	"Say Goodnight"	4:02
13.	"Awaken"	3:57
14.	"Ordo ab Chao"	1:04
15.	"Brought to Light"	5:05
Total length:		51:08

== Charts ==
Chart (2016)	Peak position
US Billboard 200	115
