= The North Corridor =

Studio album by Chevelle
- Released: July 8, 2016
- Recorded: February–April 2016
- Studios: Megawatt Recording, Valley Village, California
- Genres: Alternative metal; hard rock; post-grunge
- Length: 44:25
- Label: Epic
- Producer: Joe Barresi

Chevelle chronology
La Gárgola (2014)	The North Corridor (2016)	12 Bloody Spies (2018)

Singles from The North Corridor
- 1. "Joyride (Omen)" Released: May 13, 2016; 2. "Door to Door Cannibals" Released: October 3, 2016; 3. "Rivers" Released: May 9, 2017

Alternative cover

The North Corridor is the eighth studio album by the American rock band Chevelle, released on July 8, 2016. It is also the last studio album with Dean Bernardini, who left the band in late September 2019.

== Album cover ==
The album cover for the regular edition features a goat similar to Black Philip from the film The Witch. The alternate cover features Pete Loeffler's son.

== Release ==
On May 10, 2016, the band announced that their new album will be titled The North Corridor, which was released on July 8, 2016. The first single from the album, "Joyride (Omen)", was released to radio in May 2016. The group also added that the first 2016 pre-orders would be signed by the band; but later decided that all pre-orders would be signed due to the servers crashing when the preorders went live. "Door to Door Cannibals" and "Rivers" were also released as singles. The band announced on June 20 that the song "Young Wicked" would be available to everyone who pre-ordered the album on June 23, 2016.

== Composition ==
The North Corridor has been described as alternative metal, hard rock, and post-grunge. The album has been considered the band's heaviest album. The albums focuses more on heavy guitar riffs and lyrical themes influenced by horror. Despite the album's heavier sound, the song "Punchline" utilizes electronic elements.

== Critical reception ==
Professional ratings
Review scores
Source	Rating
AllMusic	4/5 stars
Sputnikmusic	4.1/5
Ultimate Guitar	7.7/10

Critical reception to the album has been generally positive. AllMusic's Neil Yeung has described the album as Chevelle's "heaviest, darkest, and most aggressive effort in over a decade." Stanciu Raul of Sputnikmusic stated "The North Corridor soars like never before, surpassing This Type of Thinking (Could Do Us In), and La Gárgola without feeling one-sided. [Chevelle are] always tweaking the overall sound in small amounts, so that you’ll be constantly surprised."

=== Accolades ===
Publication	Accolade	Rank
Loudwire	20 Best Rock Albums of 2016	8
Sputnikmusic	Top 50 Albums of 2016	40

== Track listing ==
All music is composed by Chevelle.

No.	Title	Length
1.	"Door to Door Cannibals"	4:35
2.	"Enemies"	3:29
3.	"Joyride (Omen)"	3:37
4.	"Rivers"	3:59
5.	"Last Days"	4:11
6.	"Young Wicked"	3:05
7.	"Warhol's Showbiz"	4:29
8.	"Punchline"	5:10
9.	"Got Burned"	3:39
10.	"Shot from a Cannon"	8:11
Total length:		44:25

GetMoreChevelle.com exclusive bonus track
No.	Title	Length
11.	"A Miracle"	5:31
Total length:		49:56

== Personnel ==
Chevelle

- Pete Loeffler – vocals, guitar, art direction
- Sam Loeffler – drums
- Dean Bernardini – bass, direction, drums and artwork

Technical personnel

- Dave Collins – mastering
- Joe Barresi – producer, mixing
- Marcel Fernandez – assistant producer
- Morgan Stratton – assistant producer

== Charts ==
=== Weekly charts ===
Chart (2016)	Peak position
Australian Albums (ARIA)	69
Canadian Albums (Billboard)	19
New Zealand Heatseekers Albums (RMNZ)	2
US Billboard 200	8
US Top Rock Albums (Billboard)	1

=== Year-end charts ===
Chart (2016)	Position
US Top Rock Albums (Billboard)	56
