= Emotionless (Red Sun Rising song) =

Single by Red Sun Rising

from the album Polyester Zeal
- Released: January 4, 2016
- Recorded: 2015
- Genre: Hard rock, alternative rock
- Length: 4:22
- Label: Razor & Tie
- Songwriters: Robert Marlette; Mike Protich; Ryan Williams
- Producer: Bob Marlette

Red Sun Rising singles chronology
"The Otherside" (2015)	"Emotionless" (2016)	"Amnesia" (2016)

Music video
- "Emotionless" on YouTube

"Emotionless" is a song by the American rock band Red Sun Rising. It was released on January 4, 2016 on their third album Polyester Zeal as the second single. A longer version of the song was previously released on their EP "Into Forever."

== Charts ==
Chart (2016)	Peak position
Canada Rock (Billboard)	45
US Hot Rock & Alternative Songs (Billboard)	38
US Rock & Alternative Airplay (Billboard)	17
US Mainstream Rock (Billboard)	1

== See also ==
- List of Billboard Mainstream Rock number-one songs of the 2010s
