= The Otherside (Red Sun Rising song) =

Single by Red Sun Rising

from the album Polyester Zeal
- Released: August 7, 2015
- Recorded: 2015
- Genre: Hard rock, alternative rock
- Length: 3:36
- Label: Razor & Tie
- Songwriters: Ryan Williams; Mike Protich; Tyler Valendza; Robert Marlette
- Producer: Bob Marlette

Red Sun Rising singles chronology
"The Otherside" (2015)	"Emotionless" (2016)

Music video
- "The Otherside" on YouTube

"The Otherside" is a song by the American rock band Red Sun Rising. It was released on August 7, 2015 on their third album Polyester Zeal as the lead single.

== Background and development ==
In an interview with Loudwire, lead singer Mike Protich explained how he and the band wrote the song during their time in Los Angeles and carried a "darker vibe" similar to the grunge band Alice in Chains. He also described the lyrics as being about existentialism and the meaning of life: "It doesn't really matter how you live your life here on earth, it's kind of insignificant when you compare it to eternal time because everyone comes out on the other side. How you live your life is up to you but you're going to come out on the other side regardless. It's kind of a simple concept but more cerebral I guess."

== Music video ==
Directed by Brad Golowin, the video features "mired images" of the band performing and lead singer Mike Protich covered in mud.

== Charts ==
Chart (2015)	Peak position
Canada Rock (Billboard)	20
US Hot Rock & Alternative Songs (Billboard)	42
US Rock & Alternative Airplay (Billboard)	17
US Mainstream Rock (Billboard)	1

== See also ==
- List of Billboard Mainstream Rock number-one songs of the 2010s
