= Red Sun Rising =

American rock band

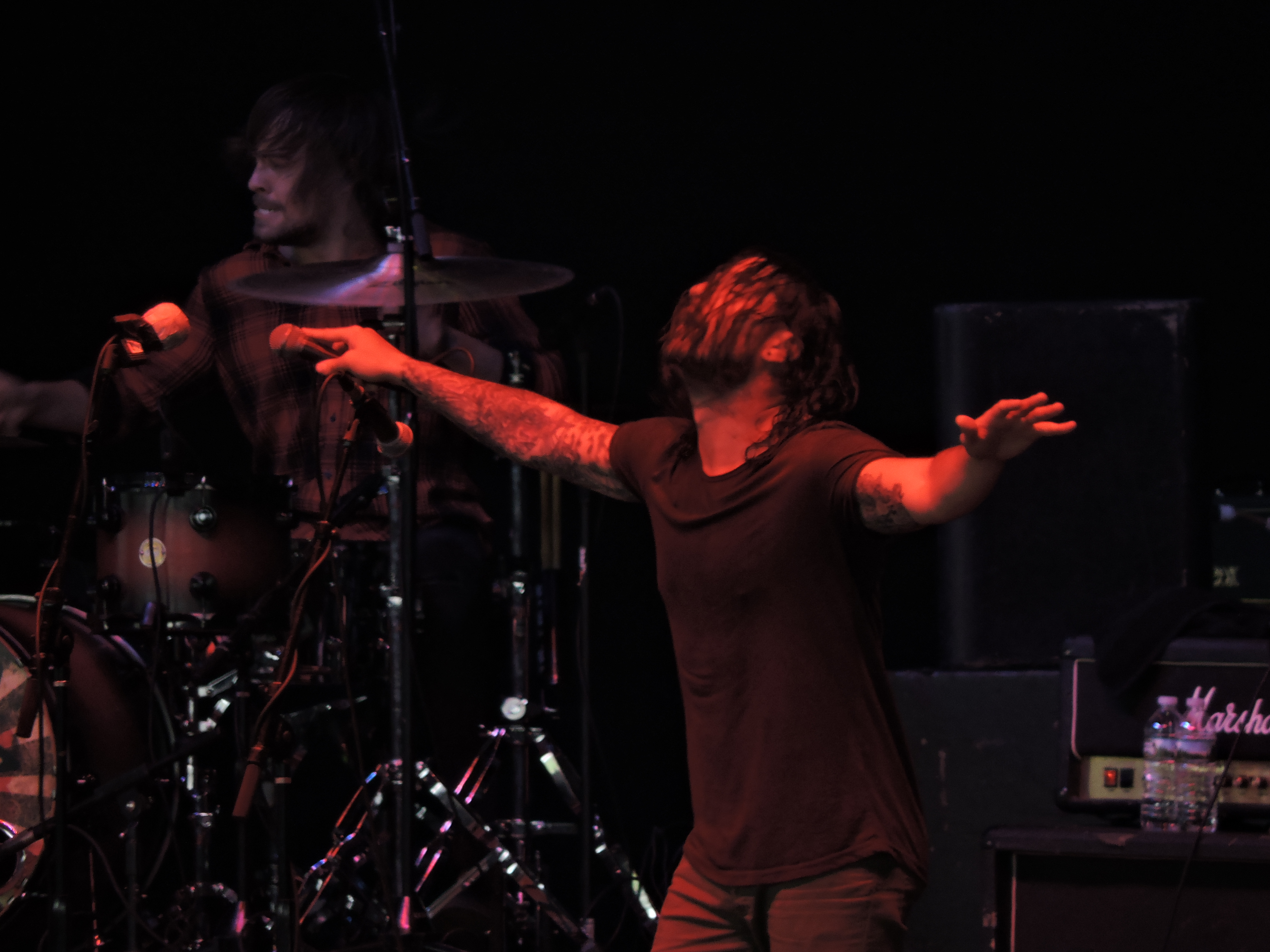
- Red Sun Rising performing at MMRBQ 2016 Camden, NJ

Background information
- Origin: Akron, Ohio
- Genres: Alternative rock, hard rock
- Years active: 2007–2020 (hiatus)
- Labels: Razor & Tie
- Spinoffs: The Violent; New Monarch
- Members: Mike Protich; Ryan Williams; Dave McGarry; Ricky Miller; Pat Gerasia
- Past members: Mark Jendrisak; Mitch Bandel; Mark Matthews; Adam Mercer; Tyler Valendza; Hayes Hornish; Bobby Consiglio
- Website: redsunrisingmusic.com redsunrising.bandcamp.com

Red Sun Rising was an American rock band from Akron, Ohio that is currently on hiatus. The band has released two studio albums through the Razor & Tie record label; their first, Polyester Zeal, in 2015, and their second, Thread, on March 30, 2018. The band also released an EP titled Peel on March 22, 2019.

== History ==
Red Sun Rising formed in 2007 when Hayes Hornish and Ryan Williams met with Mike Protich, Williams’s former high school classmate, to test his vocal ability after the two had discussed music at a gas station. The three conceived the band's name at a local bar and began to write songs together. Later that year, Red Sun Rising's first line-up was formed and they were playing local gigs. In 2011, Tyler Valendza joined the group, bringing a new element to the group's sound.

They built a following by previewing their self-released albums over their social media websites and were touring nationally by 2013. In 2014, the band signed with Razor & Tie records and released their album Polyester Zeal in August 2015 which debuted at number 11 on the Billboard Hard Rock album chart. In 2015, Tyler Valendza left the band and was replaced by Dave McGarry, who was first announced as the new guitarist in a Facebook post.

Their singles "The Otherside" and "Emotionless" both reached number 1 on the Mainstream Rock chart, making them the first band since Trapt to reach number 1 twice on their first album. Their third single "Amnesia" peaked at number 6 on the same chart. The band often uses the hashtag #WeAreThread, which is said to be the name of the genre of music they would like to represent. They explain that their influences are like the threads in fabric and they feel they cannot truly be described as one particular genre.

"Deathwish" was featured in the 2018 video game Forza Horizon 4 on its in-game rock radio station Horizon XS.

Red Sun Rising announced an indefinite hiatus on February 28, 2020. Ryan Williams went on to form New Monarch The first single "The Fray" was released May 28, 2021 . Members Mike Protich, Dave McGarry, and Pat Gerasia formed a new band, The Violent. In 2024, drummer Pat Gerasia joined forces with Jibe vocalist Joe Grah and former Gemini Syndrome guitarist, Filter, Theory Of A Deadman bassist Charles Lee Salvaggio to form the hard rock group Inside The Trojan Horse. The video for the first single, Burn, premiered on BraveWords on August 7, 2024. The video for the trio's second single, Savior, premiered on I'm Music Magazine Friday, September 13, 2024. On Friday, October 30, 2024, KRAVE Rock Radio premiered ITTH's third single, How They Run. On Friday, November 22, 2024, BleachedBangs Magazine premiered the power-trio's fourth single and video, Stay Alive. On Christmas morning, Wednesday, December 25, 2024, the trio debuted their fifth single and video, Blood and Teeth, on Youtube. The trio released a second EP, Origins, on Friday, May 23, 2025, with the songs Dogs, Fifteen, and Children. A self-directed music video debuted on YouTube the same day.

== Band members ==
Current members

- Ryan Williams – lead guitar (2006-2020)
- Mike Protich – lead vocals, guitar (2007–2020)
- Dave McGarry – rhythm guitar, backing vocals (2015–2020)
- Ricky Miller – bass, backing vocals (2015–2020)
- Pat Gerasia – drums, percussion (2015–2020)

Former members

- Mark Jendrisak – drums (2009–2013)
- Hayes Hornish – bass, backing vocals (2007–2011)
- Mitch Bandel – bass, backing vocals (2011–2013)
- Mark Matthews – bass, backing vocals (2013–2015)
- Adam Mercer – drums, percussion (2013–2014)
- Tyler Valendza – rhythm guitar (2012–2015)
- Bobby Consiglio - drums, backing vocals (2007-2008)

== Discography ==
=== Studio albums ===
Title	Peak chart positions		
Title	Rock Albums	Hard Rock Albums	Heatseekers Albums
Polyester Zeal: Released: August 7, 2015; Label: Razor & Tie; Formats: CD, digital download	41	11	7
Thread: Released: March 30, 2018; Label: Razor & Tie; Formats: CD, digital download	-	21	3
"—" denotes a recording that did not chart or was not released in that territory.

=== Independent albums ===
Title
Red Sun Rising
- Released: 2010
- Label: Independent
- Formats: CD, digital download
Making of Kings
- Released: 2011
- Label: Independent
- Formats: CD, digital download

=== EPs ===
- The Fix (2012)
- Into Forever (2013)
- Peel (2019)

=== Singles ===
Title	Year	Peak chart positions				Album
Title	Year	US Air.	US Main.	US Rock	CAN Rock	Album
"Beautiful Suicide"	2010	—	—	—	—	Red Sun Rising
"Making of Kings"	2011	—	—	—	—	Making of Kings
"Love is All to Blame"	2013	—	—	—	—	Into Forever
"The Otherside"	2015	17	1	42	20	Polyester Zeal
"Emotionless"	2016	17	1	38	45	Polyester Zeal
"Amnesia"	2016	27	6	—	—	Polyester Zeal
"Uninvited" (Alanis Morissette cover)	2017	—	—	—	—	Non-album single
"Deathwish"	2018	33	7	—	—	Thread
"Veins"	2018	—	30	—	—	Thread
"Lonely Girl"	2019	—	—	—	—	Thread
"Wouldn't It Be Nice" (Beach Boys cover)	2019	—	—	—	—	Peel
"Stealing Life"	2020	—	—	—	—	Thread
"—" denotes a single that did not chart or was not released in that territory.

=== Promotional Singles ===
Title	Year	Album
"Push"	2015	Polyester Zeal
"Unnatural"	2015	Polyester Zeal
"Fascination"	2018	Thread
"Left For Dead"	2018	Thread

=== Music videos ===
Title	Year	Director	Album
"Beautiful Suicide"	2011	Unknown	Red Sun Rising
"Making of Kings"	2011	Unknown	Making of Kings
"Love Is All to Blame"	2013	Unknown	Into Forever
"The Otherside"	2015	Brad Golowin	Polyester Zeal
"Emotionless"	2016	Dylan Marko Bell	Polyester Zeal
"Amnesia"	2016	Ryan Valdez	Polyester Zeal
"Uninvited"	2017	Brad Golowin	Non-album single
"Deathwish"	2018	Brad Golowin	Thread
"Fascination"	2018	Brad Golowin	Thread
"Veins"	2018	Brad Golowin	Thread
"Stealing Life"	2018	Jason Lester	Thread
"Wouldn't It Be Nice"	2019	Brad Golowin	Peel
