= Joyride (Omen) =

Single by Chevelle

from the album The North Corridor
- Released: May 13, 2016
- Recorded: 2016
- Genre: Alternative metal
- Length: 3:36
- Label: Epic
- Songwriters: Pete Loeffler; Sam Loeffler
- Producer: Joe Barresi

Chevelle singles chronology
"An Island" (2014)	"Joyride (Omen)" (2016)	"Door to Door Cannibals" (2016)

Audio video
- "Joyride (Omen)" on YouTube

"Joyride (Omen)" is a song by American rock band Chevelle. It serves as the lead single from their eighth studio album, The North Corridor. The song became their fifth number one on the Mainstream Rock chart. No music video was filmed for the track, the band opting instead to release one for the second single, "Door to Door Cannibals".

== Background ==
In an interview with Loudwire, front man Pete Loeffler mentioned:

"Yeah, it’s a little reminder to quit chasing the past or wishing for the future type situation. Maybe someone has come into your life like that where they’re always just saying how great it used to be or how it’s going to be good when this happens or they’re actually missing what’s going on in the here and now. And I guess it kind of comes from my teens and my youth and just from having a kid. We have a son. He’s almost two now. So now, you know I was being a dad and these things are coming up. They’re resurfacing and these memories from the past and it’s me just wondering what the world’s gonna be like when he’s older. I guess I was thinking about my younger days when I was writing this song and how I was. I had a lot of really good friends but I had a lot of people who were always, you know, they were searching a lot and everything was intense all the time, you know what I mean? And instead of enjoying life, they were constantly beating themselves down and I think I got pulled into that a little bit when I was in my teens and I guess it came out in song form in this song [Joyride], so it’s just something that no one can control. You might as well just live in the moment and enjoy it because you never know."

== Charts ==
=== Weekly charts ===
Chart (2016)	Peak position
Canada Rock (Billboard)	44
US Hot Rock & Alternative Songs (Billboard)	40
US Rock & Alternative Airplay (Billboard)	15

=== Year-end charts ===
Chart (2016)	Position
US Rock Airplay (Billboard)	41
