= The Violent =

American rock band

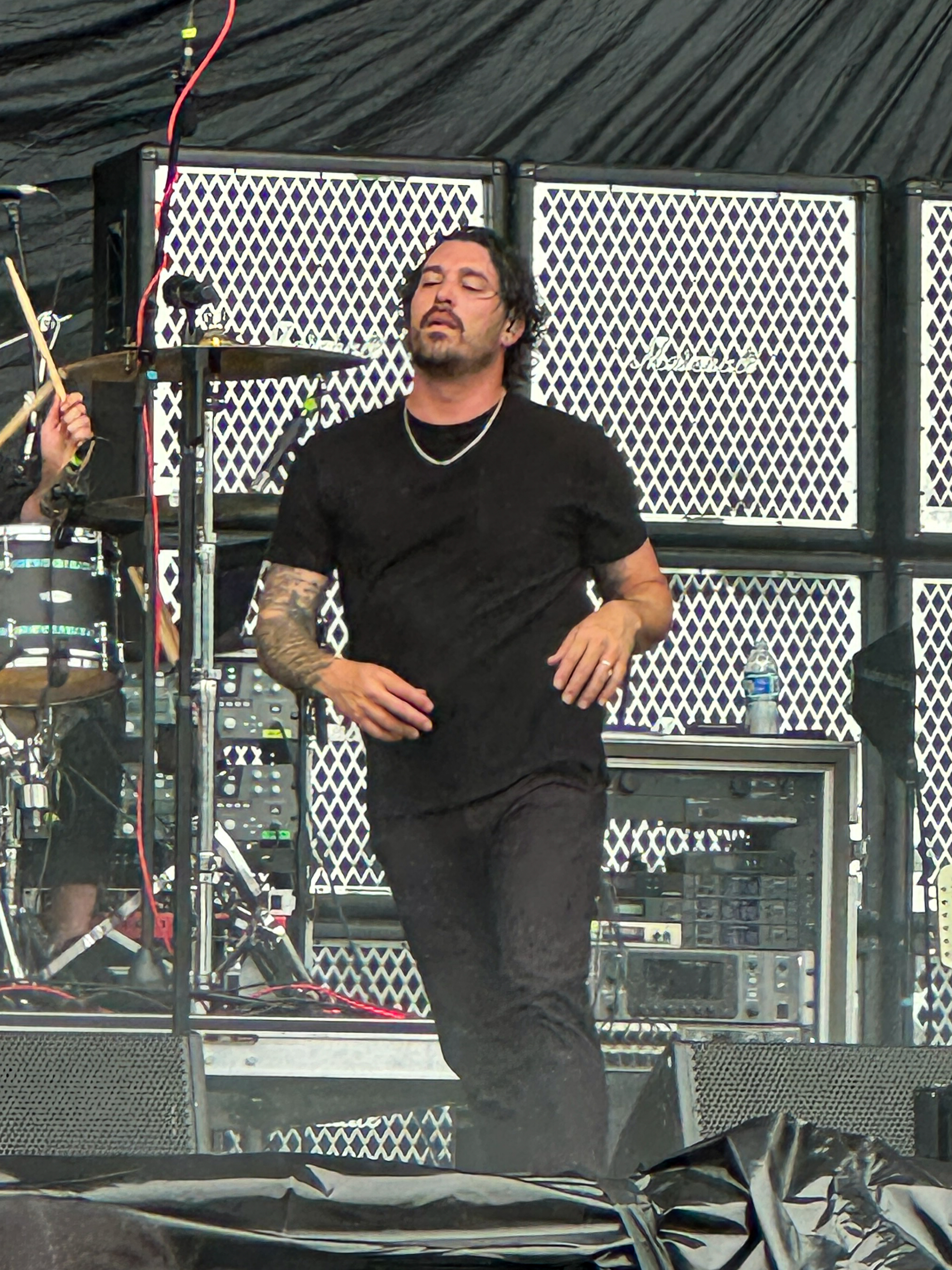
- Mike Protich performing @ Inkcarceration 2023

Background information
- Origin: Akron, Ohio, U.S.
- Genres: Alternative rock, Hard rock
- Years active: 2020–Present
- Members: Mike Protich; Dave McGarry; Pat Gerasia
- Website: www.theviolentmusic.com

The Violent is an American rock band from Akron, Ohio formed by Red Sun Rising members Mike Protich, Dave McGarry, and Pat Gerasia after that band announced an "indefinite hiatus" on February 28, 2020. (Note: Lead guitarist and founding member of Red Sun Rising Ryan Williams went on to form another band, New Monarch.)

Even before the hiatus was announced, in 2019, Protich, McGarry, and Gerasia had begun performing as a trio (billed as "Mike Protich") and playing songs outside of the Red Sun Rising discography. They released their first single "Fly on the Wall" on May 22, 2020 as The Violent, not revealing their names, stating that they are a "new independent unsigned band", only later revealing the band members' identity in a Sirius XM Octane interview. The track peaked at #28 on the Billboard's Mainstream Rock chart. The band has released two EPs since then.

Protich, who says to be the principal author of the band's material, cites Chris Cornell and other grunge artists, as well as Maynard Keenan and Trent Reznor, as influences. The Violent's music relies more on electronic sounds compared to the style of Red Sun Rising.

The band has performed as a three-piece ensemble, with Protich playing bass (and switching instruments with McGarry to play the guitar), and as a four-piece ensemble, with a hired bass player.

== Discography ==
=== EPs ===
- The Violent (2022)
- 002.TV (2023)
- 003.TV: Culmination (2025)

=== Singles ===
| Title | Year | Peak chart positions | Album |
| Title | Year | US Main. | Album |
|---|---|---|---|
| "Fly on the Wall" | 2020 | 28 | The Violent (EP) |
| "Smile Like a Hostage" | 2020 | ― | The Violent (EP) |
| "Impression" | 2021 | ― | The Violent (EP) |
| "Think For Yourself" | 2021 | ― | The Violent (EP) |
| "People are Strange" | 2022 | 28 | The Violent (EP) |
| "Counting Sheep" | 2022 | ― | 002.TV (EP) |
| "Wrap Your Head Around" | 2022 | ― | 002.TV (EP) |
| "I'll Be Waiting" | 2023 | ― | 002.TV (EP) |
| "Bitter End" | 2023 | ― | 002.TV (EP) |
| "Feels Like Letting Go" | 2024 | × | 003.TV: Culmination |
| "Fingerprints" | 2024 | × | 003.TV: Culmination |
"—" denotes a recording that did not chart or was not released in that territory.

=== Music videos ===
List of music videos, showing year released and director
| Title | Year | Director(s) |
|---|---|---|
| "Fly on the Wall" | 2020 | Jake Rains |
| "Impression" | 2021 | Mungo |
| "People are Strange" | 2022 | Samuel Shapiro |
| "I'll Be Waiting" | 2023 | Jack Fontes |
| "Follow Me" | 2023 | Johan Carlén |

== Track listing ==
The Violent track listing

| No. | Title | Length |
|---|---|---|
| 1. | "Admission" | 0:21 |
| 2. | "Think For yourself" | 3:31 |
| 3. | "Impression" | 3:17 |
| 4. | "Pocket of Your Dreams" | 0:35 |
| 5. | "ME" | 2:48 |
| 6. | "Smile Like a Hostage" | 3:30 |
| 7. | "Fly on the Wall" | 4:02 |
| 8. | "People Are Strange" | 2:27 |
| 9. | "People Say" | 3:43 |
| 10. | "People Are Strange (Bonus Song) - Alternate Version" | 1:31 |
| Total length: | | 25:49 |

002.TV track listing

| No. | Title | Length |
|---|---|---|
| 1. | "Preface" | 0:52 |
| 2. | "I'll Be Waiting" | 4:22 |
| 3. | "Wrap Your Head Around" | 4:35 |
| 4. | "Counting Sheep" | 3:24 |
| 5. | "Follow Me" | 3:49 |
| 6. | "Virtue" | 4:01 |
| 7. | "Bitter End" | 4:12 |
| Total length: | | 25:20 |

003.TV: Culmination track listing

| No. | Title | Length |
|---|---|---|
| 1. | "Feels Like Letting Go" | 3:31 |
| 2. | "Fingerprints" | 3:41 |
| 3. | "Bad Blood" | 3:42 |
| 4. | "Sinner Boy" | 3:38 |
| 5. | "Blame Who" | 3:39 |
| Total length: | | 18:13 |
