= Gemini Syndrome =

American alternative metal band

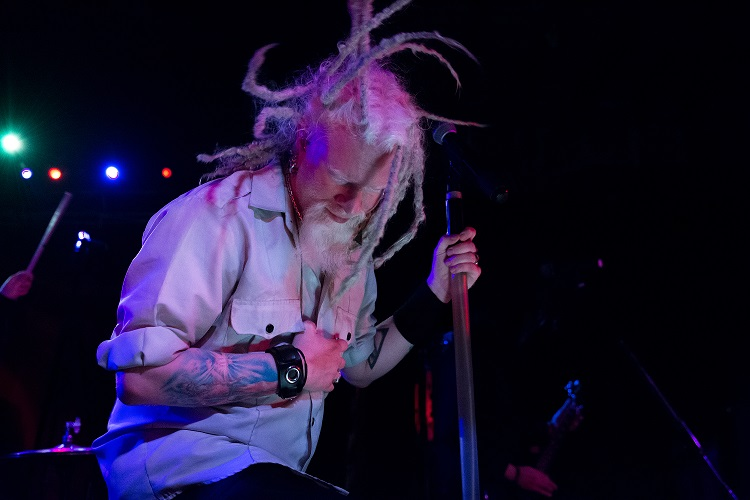
- Vocalist Aaron Nordstrom

Background information
- Origin: Los Angeles, California, U.S.
- Genres: Alternative metal, nu metal
- Years active: 2010–present
- Labels: Warner Bros., Another Century, Century Media Records
- Members: Aaron Nordstrom; Brian Steele Medina; Alessandro Paveri; Miguel "Meegs" Rascón
- Past members: Mike Salerno; Rich Juzwick; Charles Lee Salvaggio; Daniel Sahagún; Nicholas Paul Arnold
- Website: synnersociety.com

Gemini Syndrome is an American alternative metal band formed in 2010 in Los Angeles. The band currently consists of vocalist Aaron Nordstrom, drummer Brian Steele Medina, bassist Alessandro "(AP)" Paveri, and guitarist Miguel "Meegs" Rascon.

== History ==
The band's debut album, Lux, was released in September 2013. Reviewers drew comparisons to bands like Mudvayne, Five Finger Death Punch, and Tool. Four singles spawned from Lux: "Pleasure and Pain", "Left of Me", "Basement", and "Stardust", which peaked at number 19 on the Mainstream Rock Tracks chart.

Gemini Syndrome released their sophomore album, Memento Mori, on August 16, 2016, which hit number 1 on the Heatseakers Charts. Five singles spawned from Memento Mori: "Eternity", "Anonymous", "Alive Inside", "Sorry Not Sorry", and "Remember We Die", which reached number 24, and spent 20 weeks on the Mainstream Rock Tracks chart.

In a press release on September 13, 2017, the band announced that Miguel "Meegs" Rascón (formerly of Coal Chamber) joined the band, replacing both Daniel Sahagún and Charles Lee Salvaggio.

In August 2018, the group performed throughout the United States with American rock band Messer.

On December 17, 2019, the band released a video announcing a new album and that the first single is expected to be released early in 2020.

On October 15, 2021, the band released their third album 3rd Degree – The Raising. The album features the three previously released singles, "Die with Me", "IDK", and "Reintegration", along with a newly released single "Abandoned".

On April 24, 2025, former band member Mike Salerno died. The band released a tribute video on the same day. The video featured short video clips of Mike and the rest of the band while their song, "Stardust", played in the background.

On May 16, 2025, "Lucid" was released, marking the fourth single for their upcoming album, Origin: From Nothingness to Everything. As of April 1, 2025, the release date for the new album is still under consideration.

== Members ==
Current members

- Aaron Nordstrom – lead vocals (2010–present)
- Brian Steele Medina – drums (2010–present)
- Alessandro Paveri – bass (2010–present)
- Miguel "Meegs" Rascón – guitars (2017–present)

Former members

- Rich Juzwick – guitars, backing vocals (2010–2014)
- Mike Salerno – guitars, backing vocals (2010–2014, died 2025)
- Charles Lee Salvaggio – guitars (2015–2017)
- Daniel Sahagún – guitars (2015–2017)
- Nicholas Paul Arnold – guitars, backing vocals (2018–2021)

Timeline

== Discography ==
=== Studio albums ===
| Title | Album details | Peak chart positions | | | | |
| Title | Album details | US | US Hard | US Heat. | US Indie. | US Rock |
|---|---|---|---|---|---|---|
| Lux | Released: September 10, 2013; Label: Warner Bros. Records; Formats: CD, digital download | 150 | 8 | 3 | — | 44 |
| Memento Mori | Released: August 19, 2016; Label: Another Century Records; Formats: CD, vinyl, digital download | 115 | 3 | 1 | 8 | 8 |
| 3rd Degree – The Raising | Released: October 15, 2021; Label: Century Media Records; Formats: CD, vinyl, digital download | - | - | - | - | - |

=== Singles ===
List of singles, with selected chart positions and certifications, showing year released and album name
| Title | Year | Peak chart positions | Album |
| Title | Year | US Main. Rock | Album |
|---|---|---|---|
| "Pleasure and Pain" | 2012 | — | Lux |
| "Left of Me" | 2013 | — | Lux |
| "Basement" | 2013 | — | Lux |
| "Stardust" | 2013 | 19 | Lux |
| "Remember We Die" | 2016 | 24 | Memento Mori |
| "Eternity" | 2016 | — | Memento Mori |
| "Sorry Not Sorry" | 2017 | 40 | Memento Mori |
| "Reintegration" | 2020 | — | 3rd Degree – The Raising |
| "IDK" | 2021 | — | 3rd Degree – The Raising |
| "Die with Me" | 2021 | 23 | 3rd Degree – The Raising |
| "Abandoned" | 2021 | — | 3rd Degree – The Raising |
| "Primordial" | 2023 | — | Origin: From Nothingness to Everything |
| "Wake Up" | 2023 | — | Origin: From Nothingness to Everything |
| "Conquistador" | 2023 | — | Origin: From Nothingness to Everything |
| "Suffer In Silence" | 2025 | — | Origin: From Nothingness to Everything |
| "2B1" | 2025 | — | Origin: From Nothingness to Everything |
| "Carousel" | 2025 | — | Origin: From Nothingness to Everything |
| "Lucid" | 2025 | — | Origin: From Nothingness to Everything |

=== Music videos ===
| Title | Year | Director | Album |
|---|---|---|---|
| "Pleasure and Pain" | 2012 | unknown | Lux |
| "Basement" | 2013 | unknown | Lux |
| "Stardust" | 2013 | unknown | Lux |
| "Remember We Die" | 2016 | Brian Cox | Memento Mori |
| "Sorry Not Sorry" | 2017 | Brian Cox | Memento Mori |
| "Reintegration" | 2020 | Brian Cox | 3rd Degree – The Raising |
| "IDK" | 2021 | Brian Cox | 3rd Degree – The Raising |
| "Die with Me" | 2021 | Brian Cox | 3rd Degree – The Raising |
| "Abandoned" | 2021 | Brian Cox | 3rd Degree – The Raising |
| "Absolution" | 2021 | Brian Cox | 3rd Degree – The Raising |
| "Primordial" | 2023 | unknown | Origin: From Nothingness to Everything |
