= In This Moment discography =

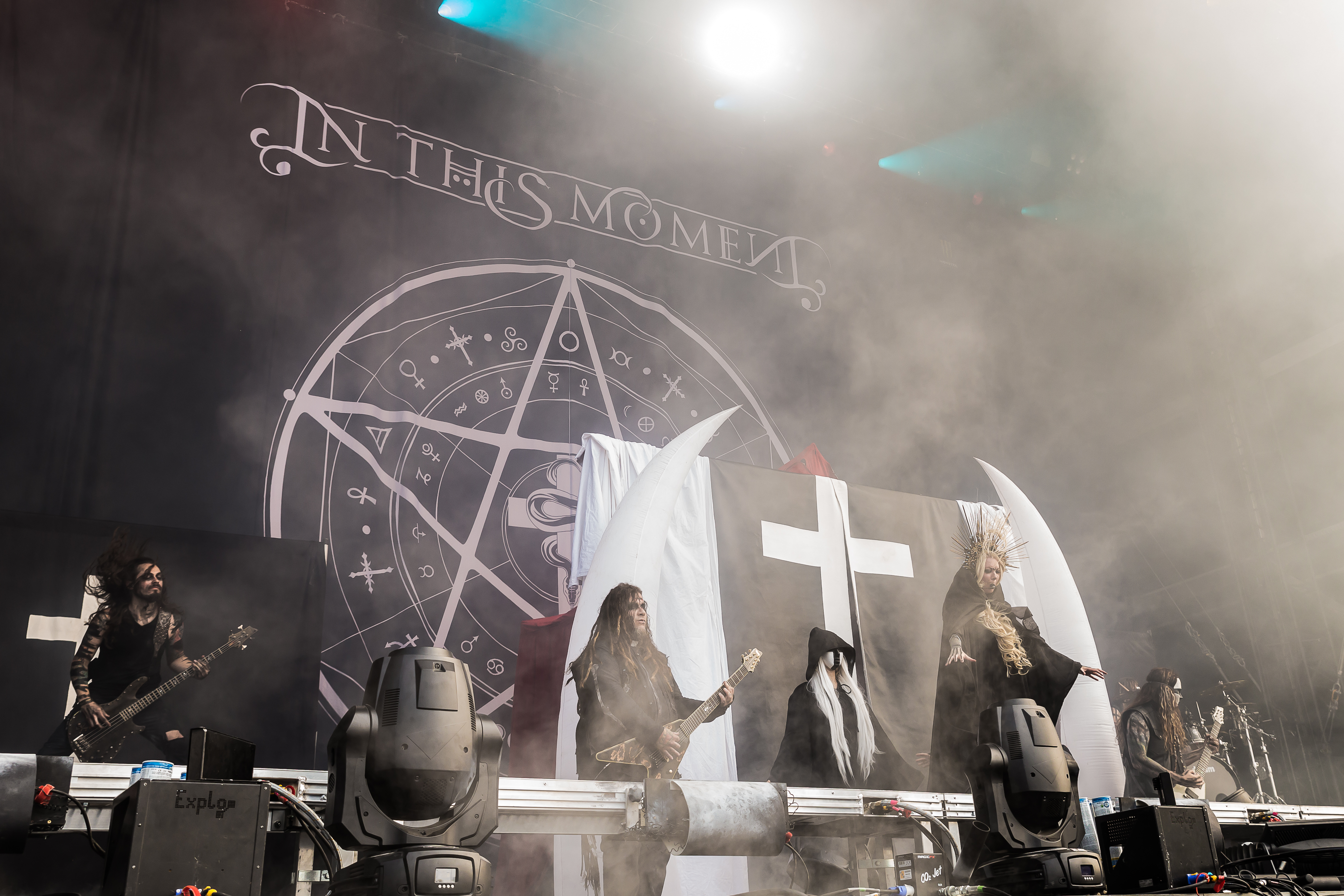
- In This Moment performing in 2018
- Studio albums: 9
- EPs: 1
- Live albums: 1
- Compilation albums: 1
- Singles: 27
- Music videos: 22

American rock band In This Moment has released nine studio albums, one live album, one compilation album, one EP, 27 singles and 22 music videos.

== Albums ==
=== Studio albums ===
List of studio albums, with selected chart positions and sales figures
Title	Album details	Peak chart positions									Sales	Certifications
Title	Album details	US	US Alt.	US Hard Rock	US Indie	US Rock	AUS	CAN	JPN	UK	Sales	Certifications
Beautiful Tragedy	Released: March 20, 2007; Label: Century Media; Formats: CD, LP, digital download	—	—	—	35	—	—	—	—	—		
The Dream	Released: September 30, 2008; Label: Century Media; Formats: CD, LP, digital download	73	—	12	—	—	—	—	—	—		
A Star-Crossed Wasteland	Released: July 9, 2010; Label: Century Media; Formats: CD, LP, digital download	40	8	4	1	13	—	—	126	—		
Blood	Released: August 14, 2012; Label: Century Media; Formats: CD, LP, digital download	15	5	1	5	5	—	15	124	187		RIAA: Gold
Black Widow	Released: November 17, 2014; Label: Atlantic; Formats: CD, LP, digital download	8	—	3	—	4	89	16	110	81	US: 120,000	
Ritual	Released: July 21, 2017; Label: Roadrunner, Atlantic; Formats: CD, LP, digital download	23	—	3	—	6	43	30	—	95	US: 40,000	
Mother	Released: March 27, 2020; Label: Roadrunner, Atlantic; Formats: CD, LP, digital download	34	—	2	—	2	58	65	—	96	US: 30,000	
Godmode	Released: October 27, 2023; Label: BMG; Formats: CD, LP, digital download	—	—	—	—	—	—	—	—	—		
Witch	Released: August 28, 2026; Label: Better Noise; Formats: CD, LP, digital download	—	—	—	—	—	93	—	—	—		
"—" denotes a recording that did not chart or was not released in that territory.

=== Live albums ===
Title	Album details
Blood at the Orpheum	Released: January 21, 2014; Label: Century Media

=== Compilation albums ===
List of compilation albums, with selected chart positions
Title	Album details	Peak chart positions			
Title	Album details	US Alt.	US Hard Rock	US Ind.	US Rock
Rise of the Blood Legion: Greatest Hits (Chapter 1)	Released: May 5, 2015; Label: Century Media; Formats: CD, DVD, digital download	25	6	21	34

== Extended plays ==
Title	Extended play details
Blood 1983	Released: October 21, 2022; Label: BMG

== Singles ==
List of singles, with selected chart positions, showing year released and album name
Title	Year	Peak chart positions						Certifications	Album
Title	Year	US Sales	US Act. Rock	US Heri. Rock	US Main. Rock	US Rock	US Hard Rock Digi.	Certifications	Album
"Prayers"	2006	40	—	—	—	—	—		Beautiful Tragedy
"Beautiful Tragedy"	2007	—	—	—	—	—	—		Beautiful Tragedy
"Surrender"	2007	—	—	—	—	—	—		Non-album single
"Forever"	2008	—	39	—	—	—	—		The Dream
"Call Me" (Blondie cover)	2009	—	—	—	—	—	—		Non-album single
"The Gun Show"	2010	—	—	—	—	—	—		A Star-Crossed Wasteland
"The Promise" (featuring Adrian Patrick of Otherwise)	2010	—	39	—	—	—	—		A Star-Crossed Wasteland
"Blood"	2012	—	8	25	9	37	5	RIAA: Gold	Blood
"Adrenalize"	2013	—	18	—	20	—	—	RIAA: Gold	Blood
"Whore"	2013	—	19	—	12	48	18	RIAA: Platinum	Blood
"Sick Like Me"	2014	1	—	—	10	36	2	RIAA: Gold	Black Widow
"Big Bad Wolf"	2014	—	—	—	20	—	11	RIAA: Gold	Black Widow
"Sex Metal Barbie"	2014	—	—	—	26	—	20	RIAA: Gold	Black Widow
"Oh Lord"	2017	—	—	—	6	— (Note: "Oh Lord" did not enter the Hot Rock Songs chart, but peaked at number 25 on the Rock Airplay chart.)	16		Ritual
"Roots"	2017	—	—	—	9	— (Note: "Roots" did not enter the Hot Rock Songs chart, but peaked at number 43 on the Rock Airplay chart.)	9	RIAA: Gold	Ritual
"In the Air Tonight" (Phil Collins cover)	2017	—	—	—	—	—	13		Ritual
"Black Wedding" (featuring Rob Halford)	2018	—	—	—	15	—	—	RIAA: Gold	Ritual
"The In-Between"	2020	—	—	—	20	23	1		Mother
"Hunting Grounds" (featuring Joe Cotela of Ded)	2020	—	—	—	—	—	—		Mother
"As Above, So Below"	2020	—	—	—	21	—	13		Mother
"I Would Die for You"	2023	—	—	—	—	—	4		John Wick: Chapter 4 soundtrack / Godmode
"The Purge"	2023	—	—	—	24	—	13		Godmode
"Godmode"	2023	—	—	—	—	—	—		Godmode
"Army of Me" (Björk cover)	2023	—	—	—	—	—	—		Godmode
"Heretic" (featuring Kim Dracula)	2025	—	—	—	—	—	—		Witch
"Sleeping with the Enemy"	2026	—	—	—	—	—	—		Witch
"Crawl"	2026	—	—	—	—	—	—		Witch
"I Want to Believe" (featuring Rory Rodriguez of Dayseeker)	2026	—	—	—	11	—	—		Witch
"—" denotes a recording that did not chart or was not released in that territory.

== Other charted songs ==
List of charted songs, with selected chart positions, showing year released and album name
Title	Year	Peak chart positions	Album
Title	Year	US Hard Rock Digi.	Album
"We Will Rock You" (Queen cover; featuring Lzzy Hale and Taylor Momsen)	2020	1	Mother

== Music videos ==
List of music videos, showing year released and directors
Title	Year	Director(s)	Ref.
"Prayers"	2007	Mike Wildt	
"Beautiful Tragedy"	2007	Robert Hall	
"Forever"	2008	David Brodsky	
"Call Me"	2009	Nathan Theys	
"The Gun Show"	2010	David Brodsky	
"The Promise"	2010	David Brodsky	
"Blood"	2012	Robert John Kley	
"Adrenalize"	2013	Robert John Kley	
"Whore"	2013	Robert John Kley	
"Sick Like Me"	2014	Maria Brink and Robert John Kley	
"Big Bad Wolf"	2014	Maria Brink and Robert John Kley	
"Sex Metal Barbie"	2015	Maria Brink	
"The Fighter"	2016	Jeremy Saffer and Maria Brink	
"Oh Lord"	2017	Maria Brink and Robert Kley	
"Roots"	2017	Maria Brink and Robert Kley	
"Black Wedding" (featuring Rob Halford)	2018	Maria Brink and Robert Kley	
"The In-Between"	2020	Maria Brink and Robert Kley	
"As Above, So Below"	2020	Maria Brink	
"The Purge"	2023	Jensen Noen	
"Sanctify Me"	2024	Jensen Noen	
"Sleeping With the Enemy"	2026	Michael Lombardi	
"Crawl"	2026	Michael Lombardi	
"I Want to Believe"	2026	Michael Lombardi	
