= Rise of the Blood Legion: Greatest Hits (Chapter 1) =

Greatest hits album by In This Moment
- Released: May 4, 2015
- Recorded: 2006–2013
- Genres: Metalcore; alternative metal; nu metal; industrial metal; electronic rock
- Length: 66:19
- Label: Century Media
- Producers: Eric Rachael; Kevin Churko; Kane Churko

In This Moment chronology
Black Widow (2014)	Rise of the Blood Legion: Greatest Hits (Chapter 1) (2015)	Ritual (2017)

Rise of the Blood Legion: Greatest Hits (Chapter 1) is the first compilation album by American rock band In This Moment. It was released by Century Media on May 4, 2015.

== Background ==
The compilation comprises the band's four releases through Century Media. Material from their 2014 album, Black Widow, is not included. The track listing was helmed by the band themselves. The DVD (US version only) contains all of their music videos except "Call Me" and anything from the Black Widow album. The title refers to the bands loyal fan base, which have been dubbed "The Blood Legion", also the title of the thirteenth track off 2012's Blood.

The album cover was revealed online on March 21, 2015.

== Track listing ==
No.	Title	Length
1.	"Whispers of October"	1:06
2.	"Beautiful Tragedy"	4:01
3.	"Prayers"	3:46
4.	"Daddy's Falling Angel"	4:12
5.	"The Rabbit Hole"	1:05
6.	"Forever"	4:23
7.	"Into the Light (live)"	5:42
8.	"The Gun Show"	4:48
9.	"The Promise"	4:29
10.	"World in Flames"	5:20
11.	"Rise with Me"	2:07
12.	"Blood"	3:27
13.	"Scarlet"	3:50
14.	"Adrenalize"	4:15
15.	"It Is Written"	0:30
16.	"Burn"	4:44
17.	"Whore"	4:05
18.	"The Blood Legion"	4:29
Total length:		66:27

DVD (U.S. only)

No.	Title	Length
1.	"Beautiful Tragedy"	4:06
2.	"Prayers"	3:48
3.	"Forever"	4:20
4.	"The Gun Show"	4:27
5.	"The Promise"	4:29
6.	"Adrenalize"	4:28
7.	"Blood"	3:29
8.	"Whore"	5:08

== Personnel ==
In This Moment

- Maria Brink – lead vocals, piano
- Chris Howorth – lead guitar, backing vocals
- Blake Bunzel – rhythm guitar on tracks 2–4, 6, 8–10
- Jeff Fabb – drums on tracks 2–4, 6, 8–10
- Kyle Konkiel – bass guitar on tracks 8–10
- Tom Hane – drums on tracks 12–14, 16–18
- Randy Weitzel – rhythm guitar on tracks 12–14, 16–18
- Travis Johnson – bass guitar on tracks 12–14, 16–18
- Jesse Landry – bass guitar on tracks 2–4, 6

Additional personnel

- Adrian Patrick – additional vocals on "The Promise"
- Mitchell Marlow – additional guitar, programming on "Burn" and "The Blood Legion"
- Ivan Moody – additional vocals on "Adrenalize"
- Kane Churko – additional engineering, additional production
- Kevin Churko – mastering, mixing, production, recording
- Eric Rachel – production

== Charts ==
Chart performance for Rise of the Blood Legion: Greatest Hits (Chapter 1)
Chart (2015)	Peak position
US Independent Albums (Billboard)	21
US Top Alternative Albums (Billboard)	25
US Top Hard Rock Albums (Billboard)	6
US Top Rock Albums (Billboard)	34
