= Blood at the Orpheum =

Live album by In This Moment
- Released: January 21, 2014
- Recorded: 2013
- Genres: Alternative metal; industrial metal; metalcore; nu metal
- Length: 60:01
- Label: Century Media
- Producer: Kevin Churko

In This Moment chronology
Blood (2012)	Blood at the Orpheum (2014)	Black Widow (2014)

Blood at the Orpheum is the first live album by American rock band In This Moment. The album was released digitally by Century Media on January 21, 2014. A DVD and Blu-ray of the concert was included in a special edition re-release of their fourth album Blood. A standalone limited edition DVD was released in Europe on February 17.

== Background ==
On April 16, 2013, In This Moment announced on Facebook that they will be filming their first concert DVD at the Orpheum Theater in Madison, Wisconsin. The show was filmed on May 21 and features a special stage setup, costume changes, props, and dancers. This show marked the first appearance of the Blood girls on stage. The set list composed heavily of material from Blood and a cover of Nine Inch Nails' "Hurt", which is omitted from this release. The DVD/Blu-ray also features interviews with Maria and behind the scenes footage. The film was directed by Brad Golowin and the live audio was mixed and mastered by producer Kevin Churko.

A trailer was released to YouTube on December 23 and a performance of "Beautiful Tragedy" was released on January 10.

== Track listing ==
No.	Title	Length
1.	"It is Written"	0:33
2.	"Rise with Me"	2:01
3.	"Adrenalize"	4:28
4.	"Interview 'Live DVD'"	0:41
5.	"Blazin'"	4:24
6.	"Interview 'Beast Within'"	0:47
7.	"Beast Within"	3:59
8.	"Beautiful Tragedy"	5:56
9.	"Interview 'Into the Light'"	0:40
10.	"Into the Light"	5:42
11.	"Interview 'The Best Crew Ever'"	0:29
12.	"The Blood Legion"	4:16
13.	"Interview 'Gunshow'"	0:26
14.	"The Gun Show"	4:49
15.	"Interview 'Whore'"	1:49
16.	"Whore"	4:14
17.	"Interview 'Burn'"	0:32
18.	"Burn"	8:34
19.	"Blood"	6:54
Total length:		60:01

== Video track listing ==
1. Intro ("It Is Written"/"Rise with Me")
2. "Adrenalize"
3. "Blazin'"
4. "Beast Within"
5. "Beautiful Tragedy"
6. "Into the Light"
7. "The Blood Legion"
8. "The Gun Show"
9. "Whore"
10. Shadow dance
11. "Burn"
12. "Blood"
13. Ending credits ("Whore")

== Personnel ==
In This Moment

- Maria Brink – lead vocals, piano
- Chris Howorth – lead guitar, backing vocals
- Tom Hane – drums
- Randy Weitzel – rhythm guitar
- Travis Johnson – bass guitar

Additional personnel

- Kevin Churko – mastering, mixing, production, recording
