= Ritual (In This Moment album) =

2017 studio album by In This Moment

Studio album by In This Moment
- Released: July 21, 2017
- Recorded: 2016–2017
- Studios: The Hideout, Las Vegas
- Genres: Alternative metal; hard rock; industrial metal
- Length: 48:56
- Labels: Atlantic; Roadrunner
- Producer: Kevin Churko

In This Moment chronology
Rise of the Blood Legion: Greatest Hits (Chapter 1) (2015)	Ritual (2017)	Mother (2020)

Singles from Ritual
- 1. "Oh Lord" Released: May 12, 2017; 2. "Roots" Released: June 16, 2017; 3. "In the Air Tonight" Released: July 17, 2017; 4. "Black Wedding" Released: April 28, 2018

Ritual is the sixth studio album by American rock band In This Moment, released on July 21, 2017, by Atlantic Records and Roadrunner Records. This marks the band's fifth release collaborating with producer Kevin Churko.

A concept album revolving around a witch during the Salem witch trials, Ritual is the band's first album since the departure of drummer Tom Hane, who left the band in 2016 citing creative differences. Hane was replaced by Kent Diimmel shortly afterwards. On May 11, 2017, the album title and album cover was released on the band's social media. The lead single, "Oh Lord", was released on May 12, along with the track listing, music video and digital pre-order of the album. "Oh Lord" is the band's highest charting single to date, peaking at #6 on the Top Mainstream Rock Charts.

== Composition ==
=== Influences, style and themes ===
In February 2016, after a year and a half of touring for their previous album Black Widow, the band posted on social media a short video that hinted the recording of a new album. In a video interview, lead vocalist Maria Brink stated that she had already come up with a theme for the next record. The theme of the album is mostly inspired by Brink's visit to Salem, Massachusetts, with the women in her family in the fall of 2016. She said, "I was trying to find a lot of truth in myself. I loved Salem. I was blown away by how visually beautiful it is. The history of the witch burnings is fascinating. It was a special ceremonial journey." The album title refers to looking at different religions and spiritualities of the world. Lead guitarist Chris Howorth explained that Brink is "a very spiritual person, she's not necessarily religious like going to church religious but she's also not into all this witchcraft stuff, she kinda likes it all and believes openly. That's why its touching all these different topics of religion and stuff."

In an interview on April 10, 2017, Howorth said the sound of the Ritual has more serious themes, "Stylistically, I think we went a little bit more raw, you know—like, not so much campiness like 'Sex Metal Barbie.'" Brink says the record is less sexualized than the band's previous efforts, saying, "I wanted to show people and definitely women a different side of strength in me that was a really powerful force in me that didn't need the sexual part, so there's definitely a more serious overtone...a more serious deeper side of us." Sonically, the electronic elements found in the previous two albums, typical of industrial metal are less prominent with a greater presence of guitars. Though the album has dark aspects, there is also a positive message inspired by Brink's spiritual learning and experiences. Brink's love for Phil Collins' "In the Air Tonight" decided the band's cover on the album, which the band has attempted in the past. The writing and recording process for the album took four to five months. This time around, songs were written with the live show in mind, whereas in the past it was created after the album was completed. The band's main songwriters—Brink, Howorth, and Kevin Churko collaborated with other writers from outside their usual lyric-pool to expand the influences, such as Scott Stevens and Dave Bassett, as was recommended by the label. Genre-wise, the album is observed by reviewers to be alternative metal, hard rock, pop rock, and industrial metal. The album utilizes elements of pop, electronic, industrial, blues, alternative, and classic rock.

== Release and promotion ==
On February 6, 2017, the band announced their North American tour titled Half God, Half Devil, which is also a track on the album. The 19-date tour kicked off on April 7, 2017. The set consisted mostly of their previous efforts, Blood and Black Widow, while also debuting three new songs from Ritual, including "River of Fire", a cover of Phil Collins' "In the Air Tonight", and the lead single "Oh Lord". The single was released on May 12, 2017. The second single, "Roots", was released on June 16, 2017, along with the lyric video. "In the Air Tonight" was released as the final pre-release single on July 14, 2017, along with a lyric video. The album's fourth and final single, "Black Wedding" (featuring Rob Halford of Judas Priest), was released on April 27, 2018, along with a music video.

== Critical reception ==
Professional ratings
Review scores
Source	Rating
AllMusic	4/5 stars
Blabbermouth.net	8/10
Kerrang!	4/5 stars
Metal Hammer	3/5 stars
New Noise	3.5/5 stars
Salute	4.25/5
Sputnikmusic	1.5/5
Wall of Sound	3/10 stars

James Christopher Monger of AllMusic wrote that "[Brink] possesses one of the most powerful and compelling voices, male or female, in the modern rock genre. Ray Horn Jr.of Blabbermouth.net noted "pop and electronic [elements]" and a "perpetual theme of repent and deliverance...[that] is still too inherently dark to cross over to FM. This naturally makes "Ritual" vastly superior." James Hickie writing for Kerrang! described the album's change in style from its predecessor as "a positive move" and stated that the band has "delivered their best vehicle to date." Chad Bower of Loudwire writes that Ritual is "their most mature album, especially lyrically, but still musically adventurous". On Brink's vocals, he writes, "outstanding voice with a lot of power and texture, and when unleashed is a potent force. The vocal effects on some of the tracks could be dialed back to allow that force to break free more often instead of being diluted" while Metal Hammer compares the album to the band's live theatrical shows, saying "feels like it's been created as the soundtrack to In This Moment's eye-popping Lady Gaga-meets-Rob Zombie live shows rather than a standalone album" and that it's "best enjoyed with moving images".

According to Michael Pemental of New Noise Magazine, "Ritual still has enough to keep fans happy. From their loud and joyous instrumentation, to Brink’s vocal inflection that lures listeners in, In This Moment still give off a work that is different, energetic, and fun." Simon K. writing for Sputnikmusic called Ritual "a heavy pop album with none of the great vocal performances to back it up." Kaydan Howison of Wall of Sound stated that the album's "production is sloppy; featuring an unnecessarily slather of electronics over everything."

== Commercial performance ==
Ritual debuted at number 23 on the Billboard 200 with an estimated 22,000 copies sold in its first week, becoming the band's third highest debut on the chart to date.

== Track listing ==
All tracks are written by Maria Brink, Chris Howorth, and Kevin Churko, except where noted. All tracks produced by Churko.

No.	Title	Writer(s)	Length
1.	"Salvation"		2:21
2.	"Oh Lord"		4:07
3.	"Black Wedding" (featuring Rob Halford)	Brink; Howorth; Churko; Billy Idol; Scott Stevens	4:07
4.	"In the Air Tonight" (Phil Collins cover)	Phil Collins	4:57
5.	"Joan of Arc"	Brink; Howorth; Churko; Johnny Andrews	3:37
6.	"River of Fire"		3:57
7.	"Witching Hour"		4:09
8.	"Twin Flames"	Brink; Howorth; Churko; Randy Weitzel	5:00
9.	"Half God Half Devil"	Brink; Howorth; Churko; Dave Bassett	4:11
10.	"No Me Importa"		4:16
11.	"Roots"		4:10
12.	"Lay Your Gun Down"		4:03
Total length:			48:56

Japanese edition bonus track
No.	Title	Writer(s)	Length
13.	"Creep" (Radiohead cover)	Radiohead; Albert Hammond; Mike Hazlewood	3:57
Total length:			52:52

== Personnel ==
Credits adapted from the liner notes of Ritual.

=== In This Moment ===
- Maria Brink – vocals
- Chris Howorth – lead guitar
- Randy Weitzel – rhythm guitar
- Travis Johnson – bass
- Kent Diimmel – drums

=== Additional musicians ===
- Rob Halford – guest vocals on "Black Wedding"
- Scott Stevens – piano on "Black Wedding"

=== Technical ===
- Kevin Churko – production, mixing, mastering, engineering
- Khloe Churko – studio management, coordination
- Josh Connolly – additional engineering
- Tristan Hardin – additional engineering
- Randy Weitzel – pre-production

=== Artwork ===
- Virgilio Tzaj – art direction, design
- Jason Blake – photography

== Charts ==
=== Weekly charts ===
Weekly chart performance for Ritual
Chart (2017)	Peak position
Australian Albums (ARIA)	43
Austrian Albums (Ö3 Austria)	44
Belgian Albums (Ultratop Flanders)	84
Belgian Albums (Ultratop Wallonia)	137
Canadian Albums (Billboard)	30
German Albums (Offizielle Top 100)	51
New Zealand Heatseeker Albums (RMNZ)	2
Scottish Albums (Official Charts)	52
Swiss Albums (Schweizer Hitparade)	50
UK Albums (Official Charts)	95
UK Rock & Metal Albums (Official Charts)	7
US Billboard 200	23
US Top Hard Rock Albums (Billboard)	3
US Top Rock Albums (Billboard)	6

=== Year-end charts ===
Year-end chart performance for Ritual
Chart (2017)	Position
US Top Hard Rock Albums (Billboard)	43
