= Oh Lord (In This Moment song) =

Single by In This Moment

from the album Ritual
- Released: May 12, 2017
- Genre: Hard rock; blues rock; pop metal
- Length: 4:07
- Label: Atlantic; Roadrunner
- Songwriter(s): In This Moment
- Producer(s): Kevin Churko

In This Moment singles chronology
"Sex Metal Barbie" (2014)	"Oh Lord" (2017)	"Roots" (2017)

Music video
- "Oh Lord" on YouTube

"Oh Lord" is a song by American rock band In This Moment. It is the first single taken from the band's sixth album Ritual.

== Background ==
In This Moment announced on May 12, 2017, the release date, album title, and "Oh Lord" on their social media. Guitarist Chris Howorth has described the sound on the upcoming album as "stripped down" and "raw". The blusey rock song is about lead vocalist, Maria Brink's struggle in her upbringing and her relationship of what she perceives as God. She says, "For me, it’s this strength and light. When I was younger, I felt guilty for thinking of these things. I’m not supposed to touch an oracle card, a tarot card, or these beautiful things, because they’re ‘bad.’ I had these fears in me for a long time like, ‘Is this wrong?’ I realized I don't have to be afraid anymore. There's a lot of learning and an awakening in that one.”

== Release ==
The song was first premiered live as part of In This Moment's setlist on the "Half God, Half Devil" Tour. The album version premiered on May 10, 2017 on Sirius Octane and released digitally the following day. The music video premiered on the band's YouTube channel on May 12, 2017 and was directed by Brink and Robert Kley. The video features Brink in various costumes and religious imagery. Brink and the blood girls are donned in white gowns are seen performing the song with glowing orbs, which is recreated for the live shows. A live video featuring footage from their performance at the 2017 music festival Carolina Rebellion was released on June 2, 2017. As of the 29th of September 2017 the song has peaked at number 6 on the American Top Mainstream Rock Songs chart. Their highest charting single to date.

== Track listing ==
All lyrics are written by Maria Brink; all music is composed by Chris Howorth, Brink, and Kevin Churko.

No.	Title	Length
1.	"Oh Lord"	4:07
