= 3 Pill Morning =

American band

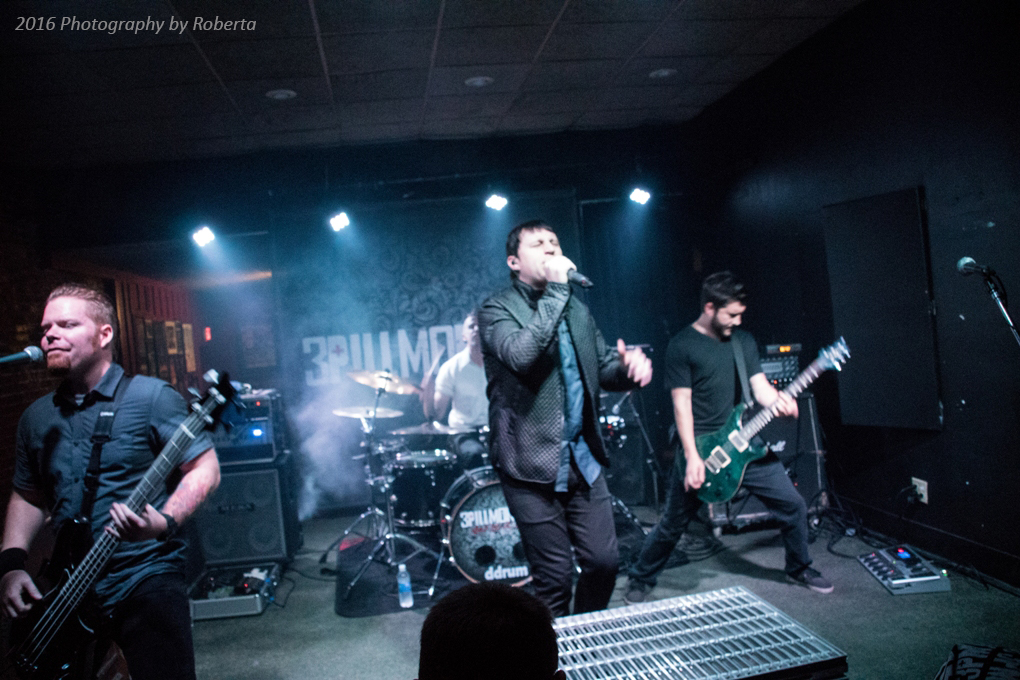

Background information
- Origin: Minneapolis, Minnesota, U.S.
- Genre: Rock Hard rock
- Years active: 2004–present
- Label: The Fuel Music
- Members: Jeff Stebbins; Gary Pahl II; Ryan Lee; Steven Starks Jr.
- Website: 3pillmorning.com

3 Pill Morning (sometimes stylized as 3PM) is an American rock / hard rock band from Minneapolis, formed in 2004. The band consists of Jeff Stebbins (vocals), Gary Pahl II (guitar), Ryan Lee (bass) and Steven Starks Jr. (drums). On October 1, 2008, the band released their debut album "The Side Effects of Chronic Ambition" independently. Their first radio single, "Loser", spawned from their EP "Take Control" and stayed in rotation on the Top 100 chart on Active Radio in the US for over 6 months in 2011. On July 17, 2012, the band released their sophomore full-length studio album entitled "Black Tie Love Affair" on Page 2 Music distributed by eOne. The music video for "Skin" was officially released on July 5, 2012. The band's latest album "Never Look Back" was released on July 29, 2016 on Countdown Entertainment distributed by The Fuel Music. The album recognized as the Billboard #15 Hard Rock Albums and #14 Heatseekers Albums for that week.

== Tours ==
- Exhale Tour with Thousand Foot Krutch and Adelitas Way Summer of 2016
- "Electric Tour" Headline Tour Spring 2016 in support of new radio single Electric Chair.
- Toured with In This Moment, Starset and Twelve Foot Ninja Winter of 2014
- Toured with Theory of a Deadman, Fozzy, Blackstone Cherry Fall of 2014
- Toured with and opened for 12 Stones in North Dakota and the Midwest in the Fall of 2012.
- Toured with Hollywood Undead and Escape the Fate on the House Of Blues tour in the summer of 2013.
- Opened for Shinedown and In This Moment on select dates in Nebraska in the summer of 2012.
- Supporting act on tour in summer 2012, with Sevendust.
- Through February and March 2012, they toured with Rains.
- Opening for Saving Abel in mid-August 2012 at the Northwoods Rock Rally.
- They played shows with Hurt and Smile Empty Soul in May and June 2012.
- In September 2011 the Armed Forces Entertainment hosted the band at the Thule Air Base in Greenland.
- North American tour with Buckcherry in 2014.

== Band members ==
Current members

- Jeff Stebbins – Vocals
- Gary Pahl II – Guitar
- Ryan Lee – Bass, Backing vocals
- Steven Starks Jr. – Drums, Percussion

== Former members ==
- Jason Hanson
- Aaron Peterson
- Adam Seiberlich
- Ryan Walch
- Dave Ackley
- Ian Combs
- Jeremy Moore
- Charlie Thompson
- Kyle Glidden
- Matt Morton
- Matt Burke
- Dan Schroeder
- Trent Laugerman
- Jon Stephenson

== Discography ==
=== Studio albums ===
Year	Album	Billboard Chart positions		
Year	Album	Billboard 200	Top Heatseekers	Hard Rock Albums
2008	The Side Effects of Chronic Ambition: Released: October 1, 2008; Label: Independent	-	-	-
2012	Black Tie Love Affair: Released: July 16, 2012; Label: Page 2 Music / A2Z Entertainment	-	#62	-
2016	Never Look Back: Released: July 29, 2016; Label: Countdown Entertainment / The Fuel Music	-	#14	#15

=== EPs ===
- Take Control (2011)
- Life Dynamic (2006)
- Clarity (2004)
- The Product (2003)

=== Singles ===
- "Rain"
- "Skin"
- "Loser"
- "I Want That For You"
- "Electric Chair"
- "The Queen"
- "Never Look Back"
