= In This Moment =

American rock band

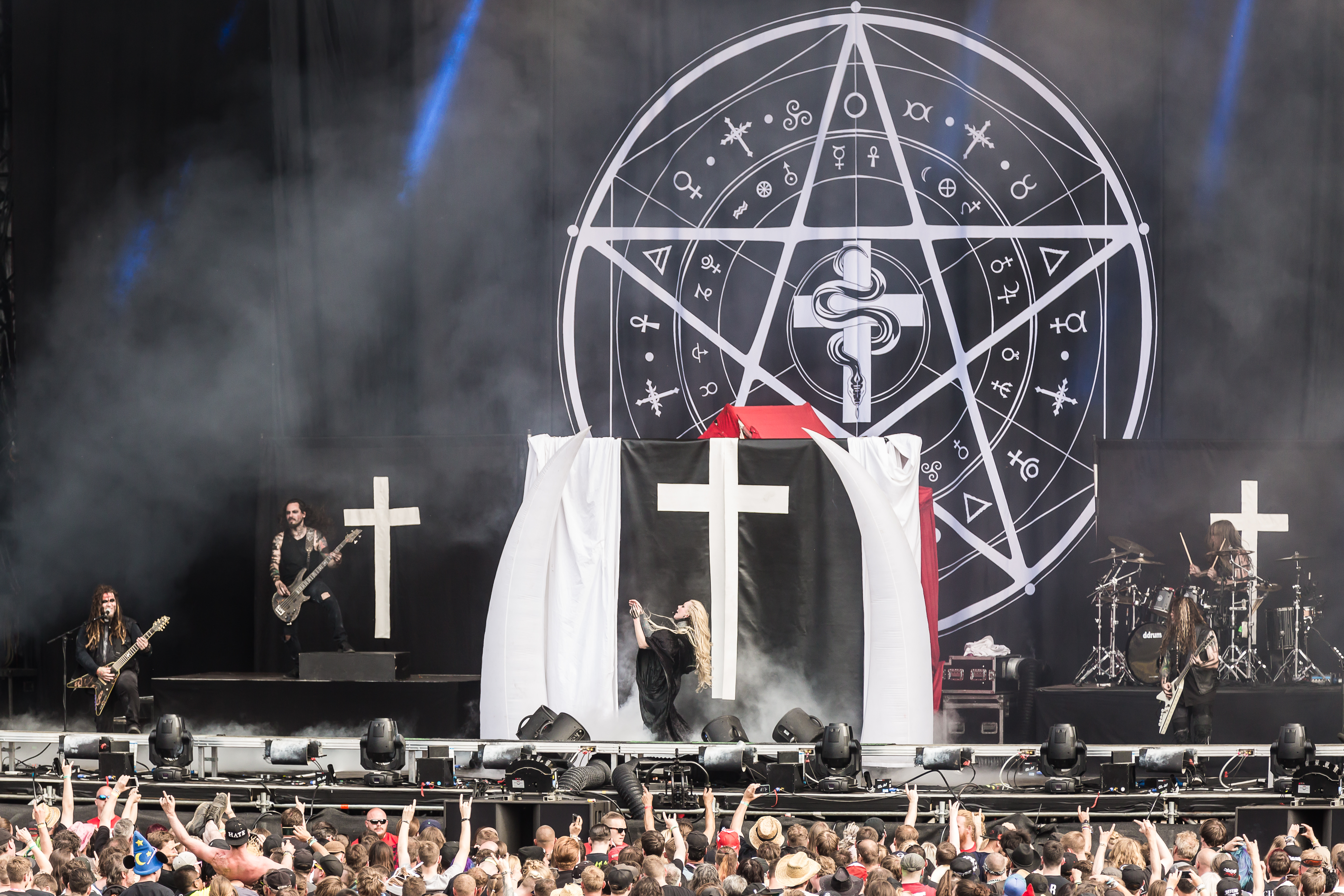
- In This Moment performing at With Full Force in 2018

Background information
- Origin: Los Angeles, California, U.S.
- Genres: Alternative metal; hard rock; metalcore; industrial metal; gothic metal; nu metal
- Works: Discography
- Years active: 2005–present
- Labels: Century Media; Atlantic; Roadrunner; BMG; Better Noise
- Members: Maria Brink; Chris Howorth; Travis Johnson; Randy Weitzel; Kent Diimmel
- Past members: Blake Bunzel; Josh Newell; Jesse Landry; Kyle Konkiel; Jeff Fabb; Tom Hane
- Website: inthismomentofficial.com

In This Moment is an American rock band from Los Angeles, California, formed by singer Maria Brink and guitarist Chris Howorth in 2005. They found drummer Jeff Fabb and started the band as Dying Star. Unhappy with their musical direction, they changed their name to In This Moment and gained two band members, guitarist Blake Bunzel and bassist Josh Newell. In 2005, bassist Newell left the band and was replaced by Jesse Landry.

Their debut album, Beautiful Tragedy, was released in 2007. Their follow up, The Dream, was released the following year and debuted at number 73 on the Billboard 200. The band's third album, A Star-Crossed Wasteland, was released in 2010, and their fourth album, Blood, was released in 2012 and debuted at number 15. Their fifth album, Black Widow, was released in 2014 and debuted at number 8, their highest chart position to date. Ritual, their sixth album, was released in the summer of 2017 and debuted at number 23. Their seventh studio album, Mother, was released in 2020. Their eighth album, Godmode, was released in 2023. The band's ninth album, Witch, was released in August 2026.

The band's lineup has changed several times. Landry was replaced by Kyle Konkiel in 2009 and Konkiel was replaced by Travis Johnson in 2010. Jeff Fabb and Blake Bunzel left the band in 2011, and were replaced by Tom Hane and Randy Weitzel respectively. In March 2016, drummer Tom Hane announced his departure from the band and was replaced by Kent Diimmel, formerly of 3 by Design.

In This Moment has received two Alternative Press Music Awards nominations, including two for Best Hard Rock Artist and one for Best Live Band. They have also received a Grammy nomination for Best Metal Performance. The band has five singles and an album certified Platinum and Gold by the Recording Industry Association of America (RIAA).

== History ==
=== Formation and Beautiful Tragedy (2004–2008) ===
In 2004, singer Maria Brink and guitarist Chris Howorth met through an audition. Howorth initially rejected Brink because she was a woman, but eventually accepted her as the singer of the band. Soon thereafter, they enlisted the help of Los Angeles drummer Jeff Fabb and formed the band Dying Star. After two shows, Howorth departed from the band to focus on other projects. Brink encouraged Howorth to return to the band. Howorth returned and they agreed to try something new with the band. The band eventually changed their name to In This Moment. By mid-2005, the lineup included Brink, Howorth, Fabb, guitarist Blake Bunzel, and bassist Josh Newell. The band recorded demos and posted them on MySpace. In late 2005, Newell departed from the band to focus on his work in music production. Producer Pascual Romero was then the bassist for a time before a friend of the band Jesse Landry was eventually tapped to round out the band permanently. Rob "Blasko" Nicholson, the bassist for Ozzy Osbourne, became the band's manager after discovering them through MySpace.

By the end of 2005, In This Moment had generated a fanbase through internet marketing and do-it-yourself touring. This sparked interest from Century Media Records, and a worldwide record deal followed. The band released their debut album Beautiful Tragedy on March 20, 2007, backed by the singles "Prayers", and title track "Beautiful Tragedy". The album was produced by Eric Rachel and combined sounds of metalcore and hard rock while the lyrics drew from Brink's personal experiences about abandonment and tragedies. The vocals on the songs alternate between Brink singing and screaming. The band performed on several tours including The Hottest Chicks in Metal Tour 2007 with Lacuna Coil, Ozzfest in 2007 and 2008, Megadeth, and the Rob Zombie and Ozzy Osbourne tour. They recorded a cover of Lacuna Coil's "Heaven's a Lie" with the band Manntis as part of "Century Media Records's Covering 20 Years of Extreme cover album.

=== The Dream (2008–2009) ===
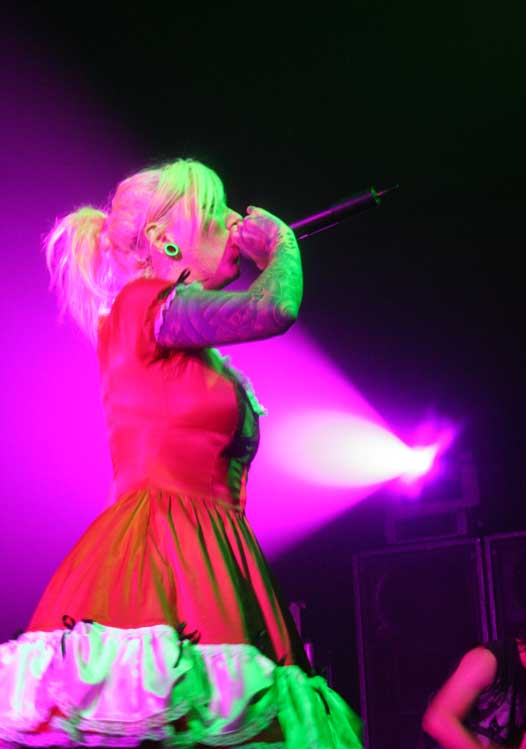
Vocalist Maria Brink performing live in 2009

In This Moment released their second album named The Dream on September 30, 2008. The album received mostly positive reviews and marked the band's debut on the Billboard 200, debuting at number 73. The album was produced by Kevin Churko and featured a less heavy approach, with a bigger focus on clean vocals from Brink. The song "Forever" was released as the album's lead single. To support the release, the band went on tour with Five Finger Death Punch, Mudvayne, Papa Roach, and Filter. They also appeared on the Give It a Name tour in the UK and were on the 2009 Warped Tour line-up, playing on the Ernie Ball Stage. They also played at Download Festival 2009 on the second stage. A cover of Blondie's "Call Me" was released as the second single from The Dream. The cover appears on the special edition, titled The Dream: Ultraviolet Edition to coincide with Warped Tour, which included unreleased tracks and acoustic performances.

The band embarked on their first headlining tour titled A Winter to Remember Tour, bringing along In Fear and Faith, Agraceful, and Motionless in White as support.

=== A Star-Crossed Wasteland (2009–2011) ===
In 2009, Maria Brink and Chris Howorth announced that the band had begun writing for the next album, citing it as being darker and heavier. Brink revealed the album title A Star-Crossed Wasteland on her official site in February 2010. Maria Brink was named the Hottest Chick in Metal at the Revolver Golden God awards in April 2010. A Star-Crossed Wasteland was released on July 9, 2010, for Europe, and July 13 for the U.S. The album's first single, "The Gun Show" was released to iTunes on June 1, 2010. The album sold 10,500 copies, debuting at number 40. The album's second single, The Promise (featuring Adrian Patrick of Otherwise), was released on September 28, 2010. The song was originally supposed to feature Ivan Moody of Five Finger Death Punch but due to business issues, Moody was not able to record vocals for the song. Producer Kevin Churko eventually enlisted Adrian Patrick to be featured on the song.

The band played Rockstar Mayhem Festival 2010 alongside Korn, Rob Zombie, Five Finger Death Punch, Hatebreed, Shadows Fall and other bands. On September 24, 2010, In This Moment officially released a video for the single "The Promise", shot and directed by David Brodsky. On November 21, 2010, it was announced that In This Moment would play alongside Sevendust, Disturbed and Korn in the Music as a Weapon V tour.

Soon after Music as a Weapon, the band went on another headlining tour titled the Hell Hath No Fury Tour, along with Straight Line Stitch, System Divide, and Sister Sin. The band was also part of the All Stars Tour along with acts such as Emmure, Alesana, Iwrestledabearonce, Blessthefall, For Today, Born of Osiris, Motionless in White, Sleeping with Sirens, among others.

=== Departure of Bunzel and Fabb, Blood, and Blood at the Orpheum (2011–2014) ===
In 2011, In This Moment parted ways with longtime manager Rob "Blasko" Nicholson. Also in 2011, In This Moment announced they were working on new material for a new album hoping for a 2012 release. This release was recorded without founding members Jeff Fabb and Blake Bunzel, who were both working with James Durbin as of September 2011. In November 2011, In This Moment took part in the ShipRocked music cruise alongside Candlebox, Hinder, Filter, Sevendust, Buckcherry, Queensrÿche, and many more. On May 14, 2012, it was announced that the band's fourth studio album Blood would be released on August 14, 2012. Blood was released as the album's first single on June 12, 2012, and the album artwork and track listing followed on June 18, 2012. Both the single and album were certified Gold, with sales of 500,000 copies by the Recording Industry Association of America in early 2017.

In March 2012, the band played some shows in Australia for the Soundwave Festival. Later in 2012, they went on to support Shinedown and Papa Roach on their U.S. headlining summer tour. The band has also appeared on the 2012 Uproar Festival, the 2012 ShipRocked music cruise, and the 2013 Carnival of Madness tour.

On February 1, 2013, "Adrenalize" was released as the album's second single. A music video for the song was released on April 9, 2013. The band filmed their first concert DVD at the Orpheum Theater in Madison, Wisconsin on May 21. It featured a special stage setup, costume changes, props, and dancers. This show also marked the first appearance of the Blood girls on stage. The setlist composed heavily on Blood. In December 2013, Whore was released as the album's third and final single, along with a music video. Blood at the Orpheum was released on January 21, 2014, and features interviews with Maria along with behind-the-scenes rehearsal footage. The film was directed by Brad Golowin and the live audio was mixed and mastered by producer Kevin Churko.

In the fall of 2013, the band headlined The Hellpop Tour with Motionless in White, West Hollywood heavy metal ensemble All Hail the Yeti, and Kyng. A second leg resumed in early 2014 with Butcher Babies, Devour the Day, All Hail the Yeti and Los Angeles melodic metal quartet Before the Mourning.

=== Black Widow and Rise of the Blood Legion (2014–2016) ===
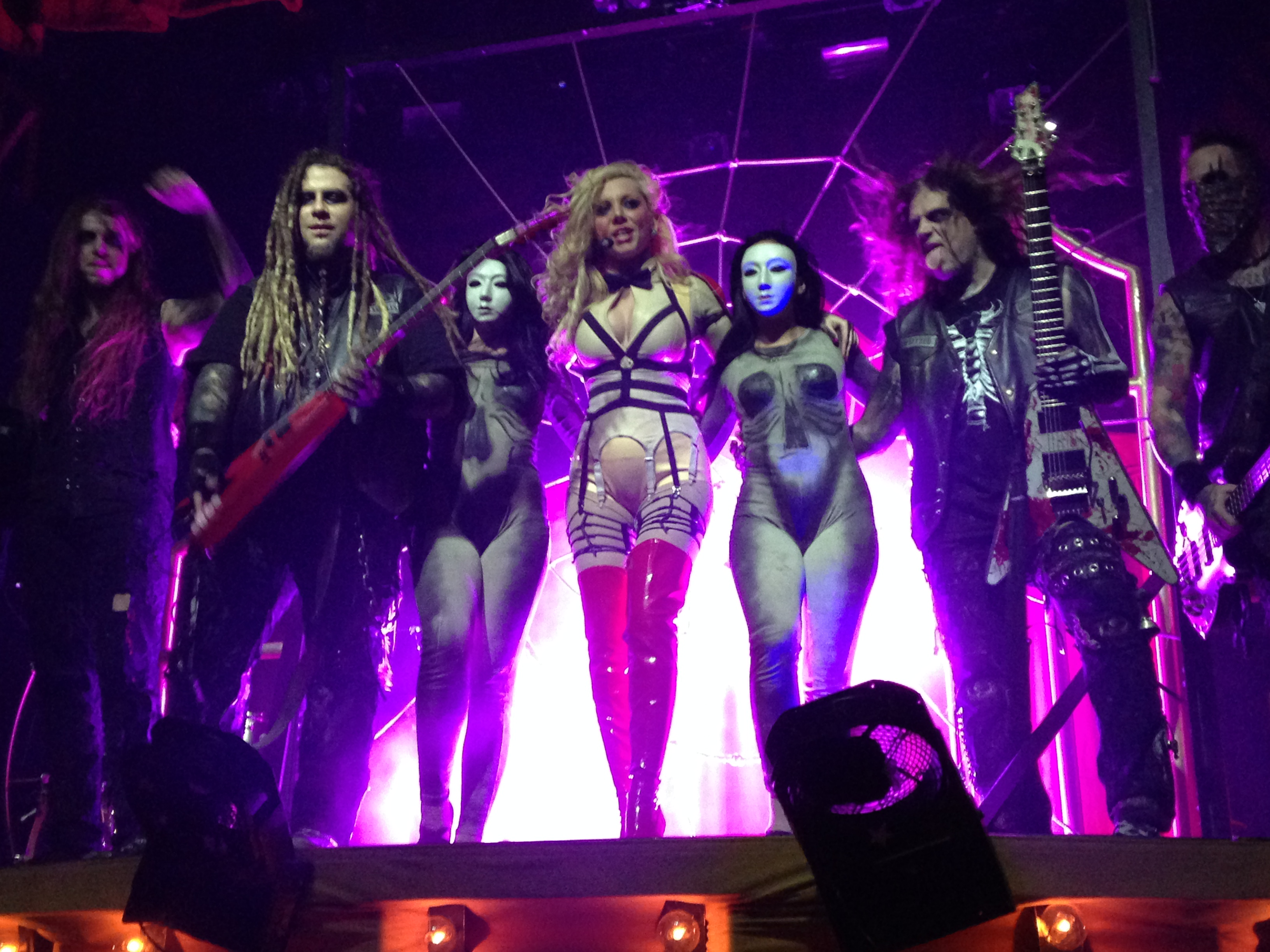
In This Moment after performing on the Black Widow Tour in 2014

On February 5, 2014, they announced that they had left Century Media and have signed with Atlantic Records, which will release their fifth album and first with a major label. They also revealed that they were set to enter the studio on February 23 to begin recording their fifth studio album and follow up to Blood. Chris Howorth said, "We have a bunch of ideas and the way we did Blood was different than we'd done any album before. We brought ideas and pieces and parts into the studio and wrote each song in the studio, one at a time. All the other albums we had the songs formatted and together already. So we're going to do the same thing again. We're gonna try to replicate the magic of Blood and try to take the style and sound we had for Blood and just do it bigger and better while still keeping true to that same vibe. That's our sound. We feel like we found something and want to stick the flag in the ground on top of that hill."

The first single, "Sick Like Me" from the band's album, Black Widow, was released on September 9, 2014. The album, produced by Kevin Churko, was released on November 17, 2014. The album's second single, "Big Bad Wolf" was released along with a music video. The album's third single, "Sex Metal Barbie" was released along with a music video. To support the release, the band performed at Knotfest on October 25, 2014 before headlining the Black Widow Tour, which kicked off on October 26, 2014, and concluded on December 14, 2014, with Starset, Twelve Foot Ninja, and 3 Pill Morning as the opening acts. The Black Widow shows presented a more elaborate stage show featuring a new set, props, and choreography. Throughout 2015, the headline tour resumed in Europe and the U.S., followed by supporting slots for Papa Roach, Five Finger Death Punch and Godsmack. The band made their network television debut on a season 2 episode of TNT's Murder in the First, which premiered on June 8, 2015. To mark the 10th anniversary of the formation of the band, on May 4, 2015, Century Media released Rise of the Blood Legion: Greatest Hits (Chapter 1), a compilation album including songs from the band's four releases with the longtime label.

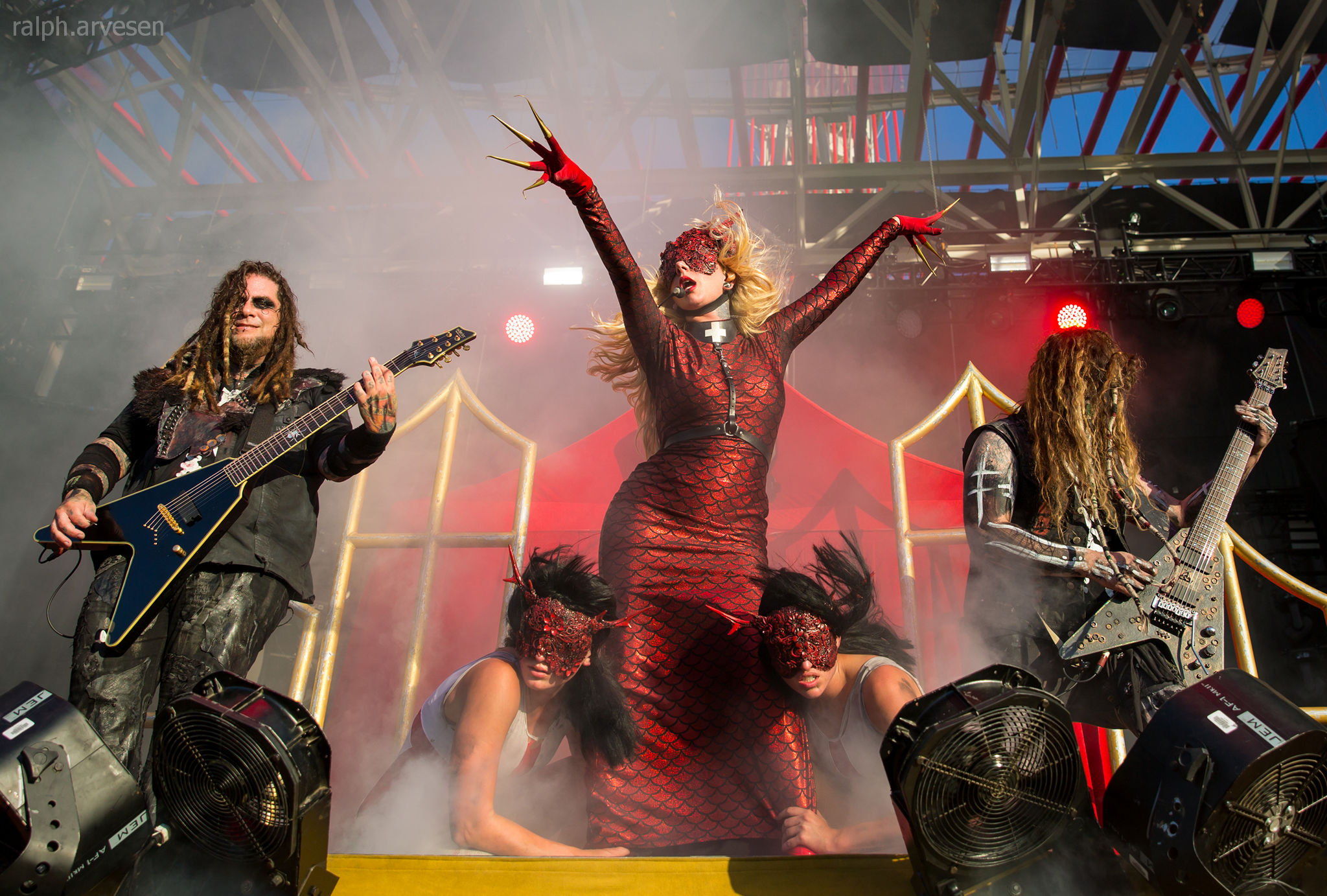
In This Moment performing in 2016

On March 16, 2016, Drummer Tom Hane announced his departure from the band, citing creative and artistic unhappiness. The band replaced Hane with Kent Diimmel, the drummer from 3 by Design. On June 18, 2016, the band kicked off The Hellpop 2016 Tour with openers Hellyeah, Sunflower Dead, and Shaman's Harvest before joining Rob Zombie and Korn for their summer tour.

=== Ritual (2017–2018) ===
On February 6, 2017, the band announced their North American headlining tour titled Half God, Half Devil. In March 2017, the band was signed to Roadrunner Records, alongside their current label, Atlantic Records. The 19-date tour kicked off on April 7, 2017, with supporting acts Gemini Syndrome, Avatar, and Motionless in White. The tour resumed for a summer trek on June 19, 2017, supported by Motionless in White, Vimic, Starset, and Little Miss Nasty and a fall run started on September 22, 2017, with Of Mice & Men and Avatar. The set list was compiled from Blood and Black Widow while also debuting three songs from the band's upcoming sixth album, Ritual, including the first single "Oh Lord"(released May 12), and third single from the album, a cover of Phil Collins "In the Air Tonight". The album's second single, "Roots", was released on June 16, 2017. Ritual was released on July 21, 2017, and said to have a more serious tone. Guitarist Chris Howorth has described the sound on the upcoming album as "stripped down" and "raw". Maria Brink said the record is less sexualized than the previous efforts, saying, "I wanted to show people and definitely women a different side of strength in me that was a really powerful force in me that didn't need the sexual part, so there's definitely a more serious overtone...a more serious deeper side of us." The album's fourth and final single, "Black Wedding" (featuring Rob Halford of Judas Priest), was released on April 27, 2018, along with a music video.

The album debuted at #23 on the Billboard 200, selling an estimated 22,000 copies.

=== Mother and Blood 1983 EP (2019–2022) ===
On February 17, 2019, Maria Brink posted a short video of herself heading to The Hideout Recording Studio in Las Vegas. The album was produced by Kevin Churko and Kane Churko. Recording for the album was completed by the spring of 2019.

A headlining spring tour kicked off on May 3, 2019, with a brand new show, with the new album originally scheduled for fall 2019. On March 25, Disturbed announced a summer tour, with In This Moment to open for the second half of the tour. That same month guitarist Chris Howorth revealed that the title of their seventh studio album would be Mother.

The band originally planned to release the lead single "The In-Between" on October 31, 2019, but decided to push the release date to 2020. In November 2019, it was announced that March 2020, would initiate a new tour, appearing together with Black Veil Brides, Ded, and Raven Black.

In January 2020, In This Moment posted several teasers, images, and clips regarding the upcoming album, Mother on their official Instagram. "The In-Between" was released on January 22, 2020. On January 22, 2020, the band officially announced that their upcoming seventh studio album titled Mother was set for release on March 27, 2020. The official album art and tracklisting has been also released. On February 21, 2020, the band released the second single of the album titled "Hunting Grounds" featuring Joe Cotela of Ded. In March 2020, In This Moment cancelled their 2020 tour with Black Veil Brides, Ded, and Raven Black due to the COVID-19 pandemic. On March 19, 2020, a week before the album release, the band released their third single "As Above, So Below".

In November 2020, the band was nominated for their first Grammy Award. The band received a nomination in the Best Metal Performance category for the song "The In-Between." The band Body Count won the award.

In May 2021, the band announced "The In-Between Tour" with Black Veil Brides, Ded, and Raven Black starting in September 2021. This tour was originally scheduled for March 2020 but had to be rescheduled due to the COVID-19 pandemic. In 2022, the band joined Slipknot on the "Knotfest Roadshow" tour from March through April.

On June 21, 2022, the band announced the "Blood 1983 Tour" with Nothing More, Sleep Token, and Cherry Bombs. The tour started on August 26 in Evansville, Indiana, and ended on October 22 in Milwaukee, Wisconsin. The band also announced the Blood 1983 EP for the tenth anniversary of the band's fourth album, Blood. This EP will reimagine songs from Blood featuring Tyler Bates and Dan Haigh of Gunship. The EP was released on October 21, 2022.

=== Godmode (2023–2024) ===
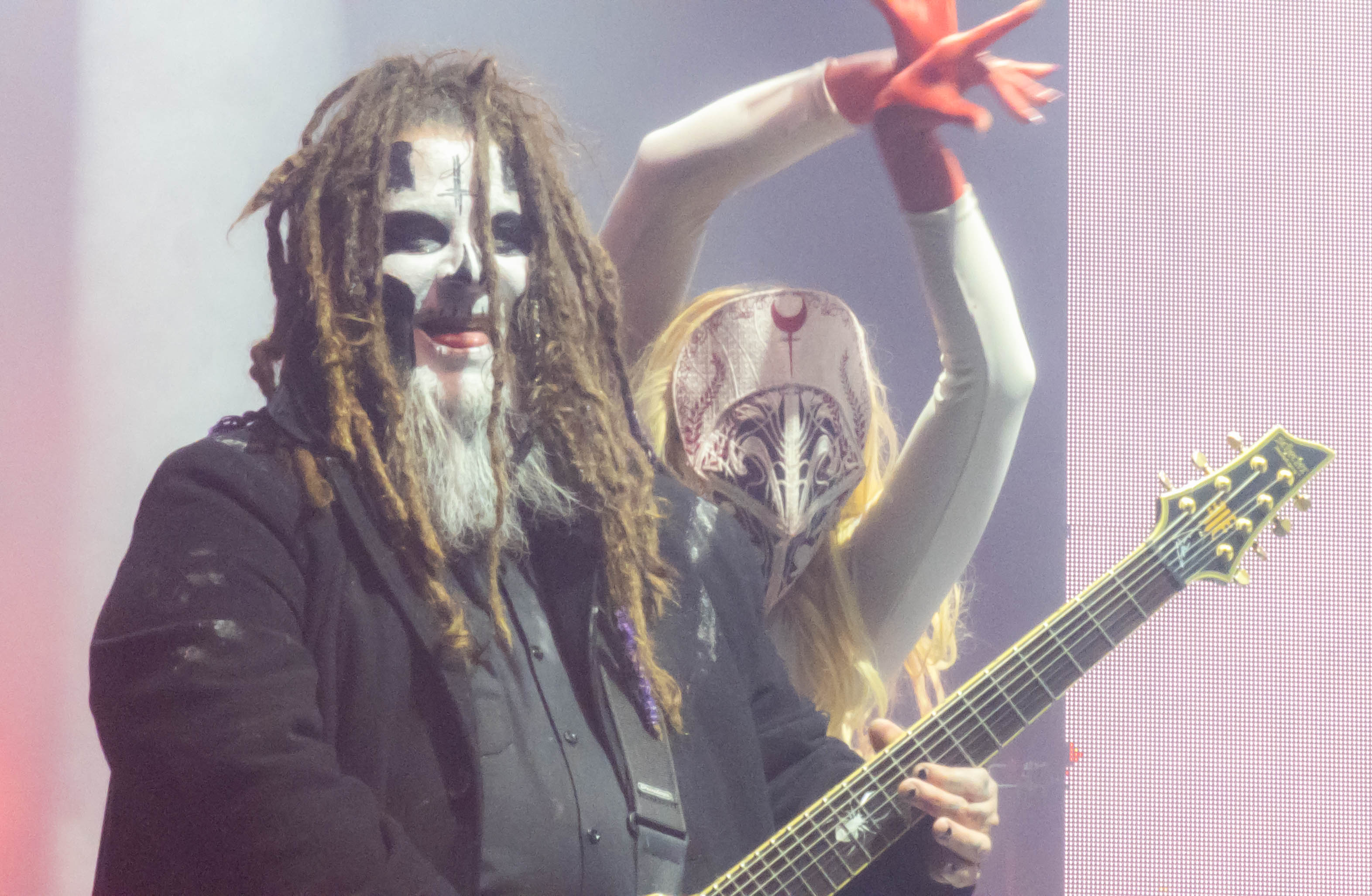
In This Moment during the Godmode Tour, Part 2 (2024)

On January 28, 2023, it was announced that the band was entering the studio to begin recording for their upcoming eighth studio album. Maria Brink stated on Instagram, "The recording of the new ITM album is about to begin...we cannot wait for you all to hear what we are conjuring up". On March 23, the band released the song, "I Would Die for You". The song is featured on the John Wick: Chapter 4 soundtrack, for the John Wick: Chapter 4 film.

On April 11, In This Moment announced "The Dark Horizons Tour" with Motionless in White. The tour started on July 8 and featured Fit for a King and From Ashes to New as special guests. On July 8, while on "The Dark Horizons Tour" with Motionless in White, the band performed two songs, "The Purge" and "Sacrifice". The band also announced that the studio version of "The Purge" would be released on July 18. Along with the song's release, the band announced their upcoming eighth studio album, Godmode, released on October 27, 2023. They also announced a co-headliner tour with Ice Nine Kills, with support from Avatar and New Years Day. On August 22, 2023, the band released album's title track as the second single. On September 20, 2023, the band released their cover of Björk's "Army of Me" on streaming music services as their third single. On August 21, 2024, a music video for the song, "Sanctify Me" was released. On the same day, the band announced a North American tour titled "The Godmode Tour Part 2". It ran from August to December and featured Kim Dracula, Nathan James, and Mike's Dead.

=== Witch (2025–present) ===
On July 15, 2025, the band released a song titled "Heretic" featuring Australian singer and musician Kim Dracula. On May 29, 2026, the band released the song "Sleeping with the Enemy". On July 17, 2026, the band announced their ninth studio album, Witch, which was released on August 28, 2026. It is the band's first album with their new label, Better Noise Music. On the same day, the album's third single, "Crawl", was released.

== Musical style and influences ==
In This Moment has been described as alternative metal, hard rock, metalcore, industrial metal, melodic metalcore, gothic metal, pop metal, nu metal, heavy metal, pop rock, industrial, alternative rock, gothic rock, and have also incorporated post-hardcore, screamo, hardcore, and arena rock into their music. The band's debut album Beautiful Tragedy and their third album A Star-Crossed Wasteland are both metalcore. The band's second album The Dream shows them becoming less intense and moving to a more alternative metal and alternative rock sound. In This Moment started to use elements of genres such as industrial and electronic on later albums such as Blood and Black Widow. Black Widow has also been described as gothic metal. In This Moment cite Pantera, Black Sabbath, Metallica, Slayer, Sepultura, Iron Maiden, Judas Priest, Whitesnake, Ratt, Mötley Crüe, Deftones, Nirvana, Dead Can Dance, and M83 as their influences.

== Band members ==
In This Moment live at With Full Force 2018

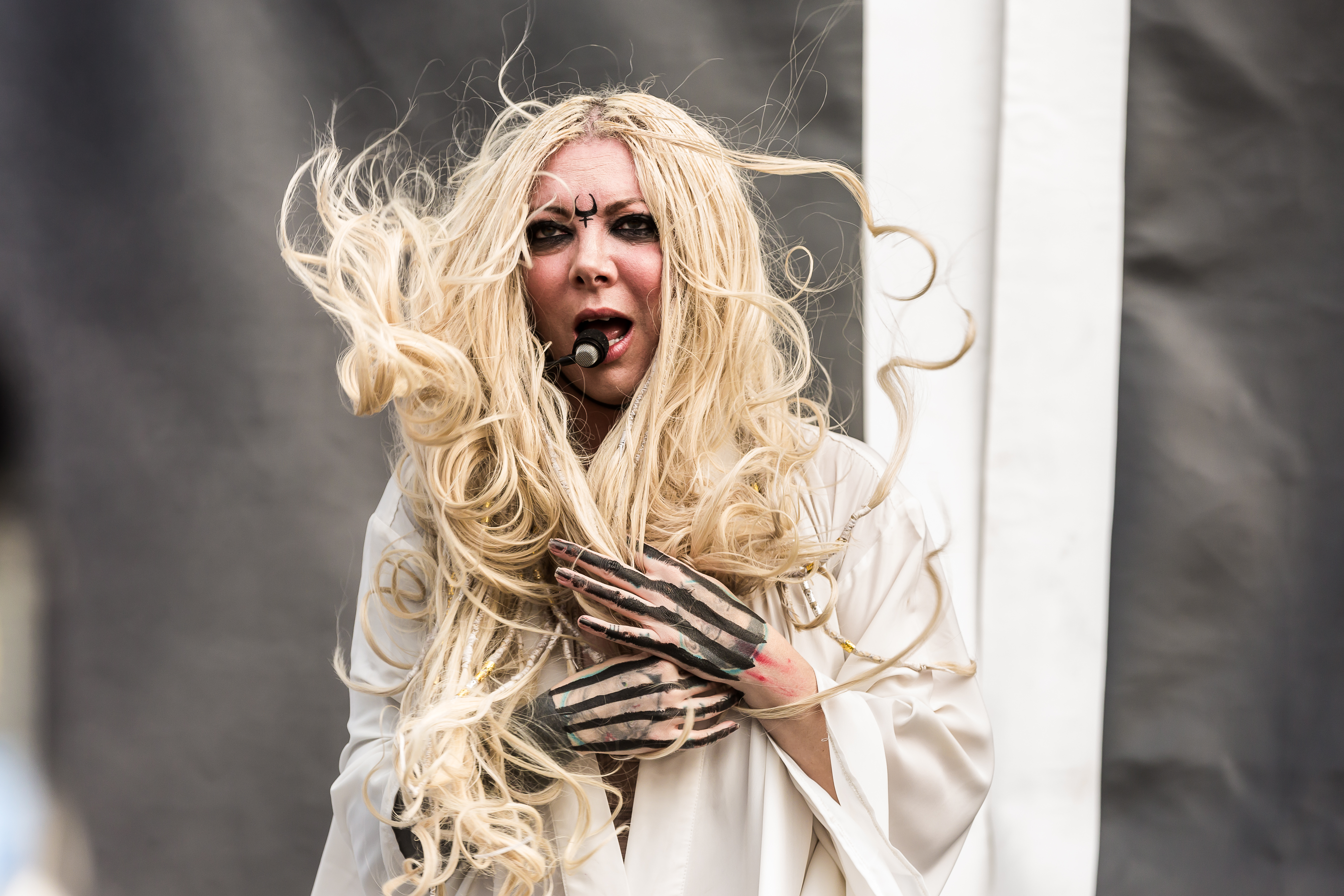
Maria Brink

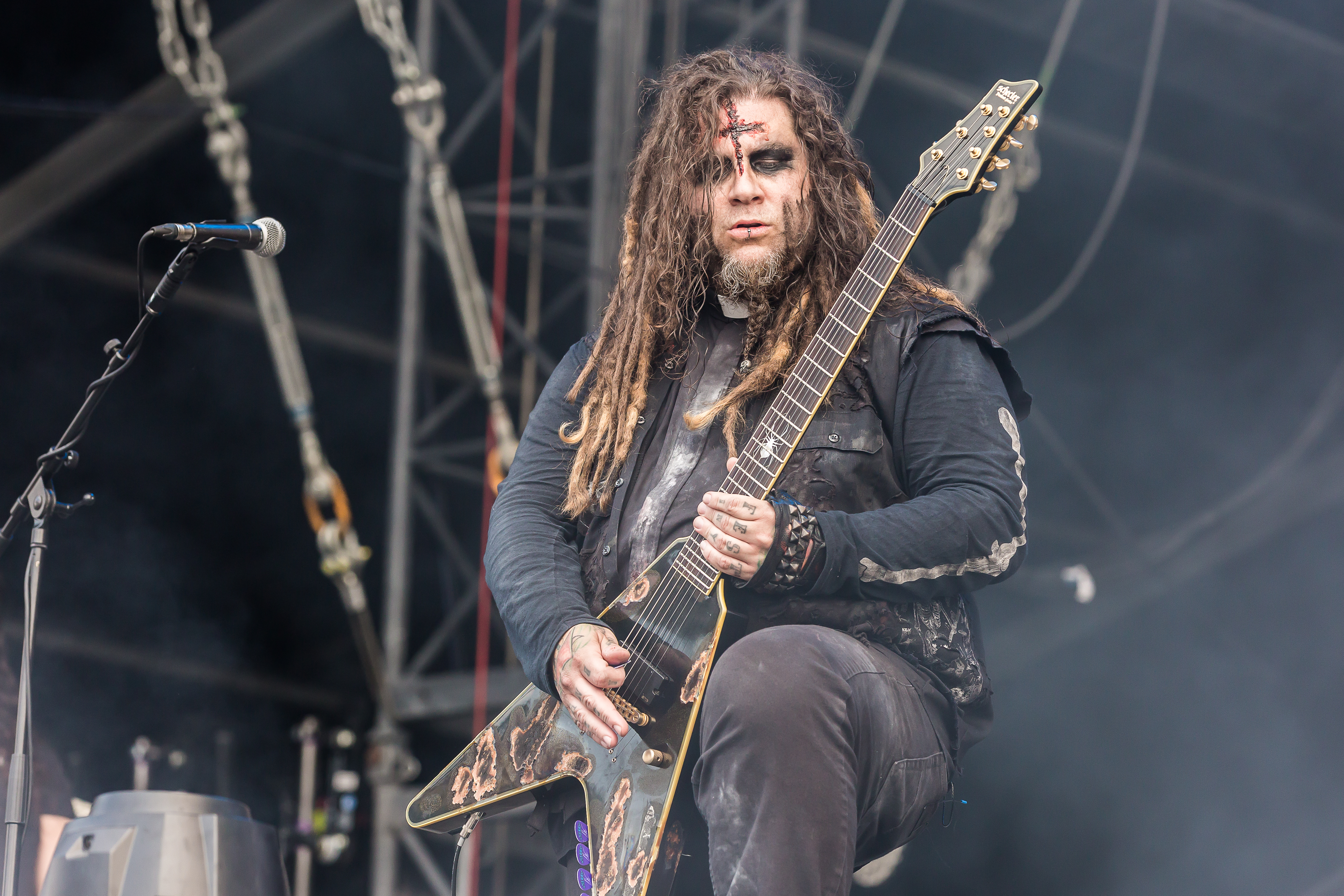
Chris Howorth

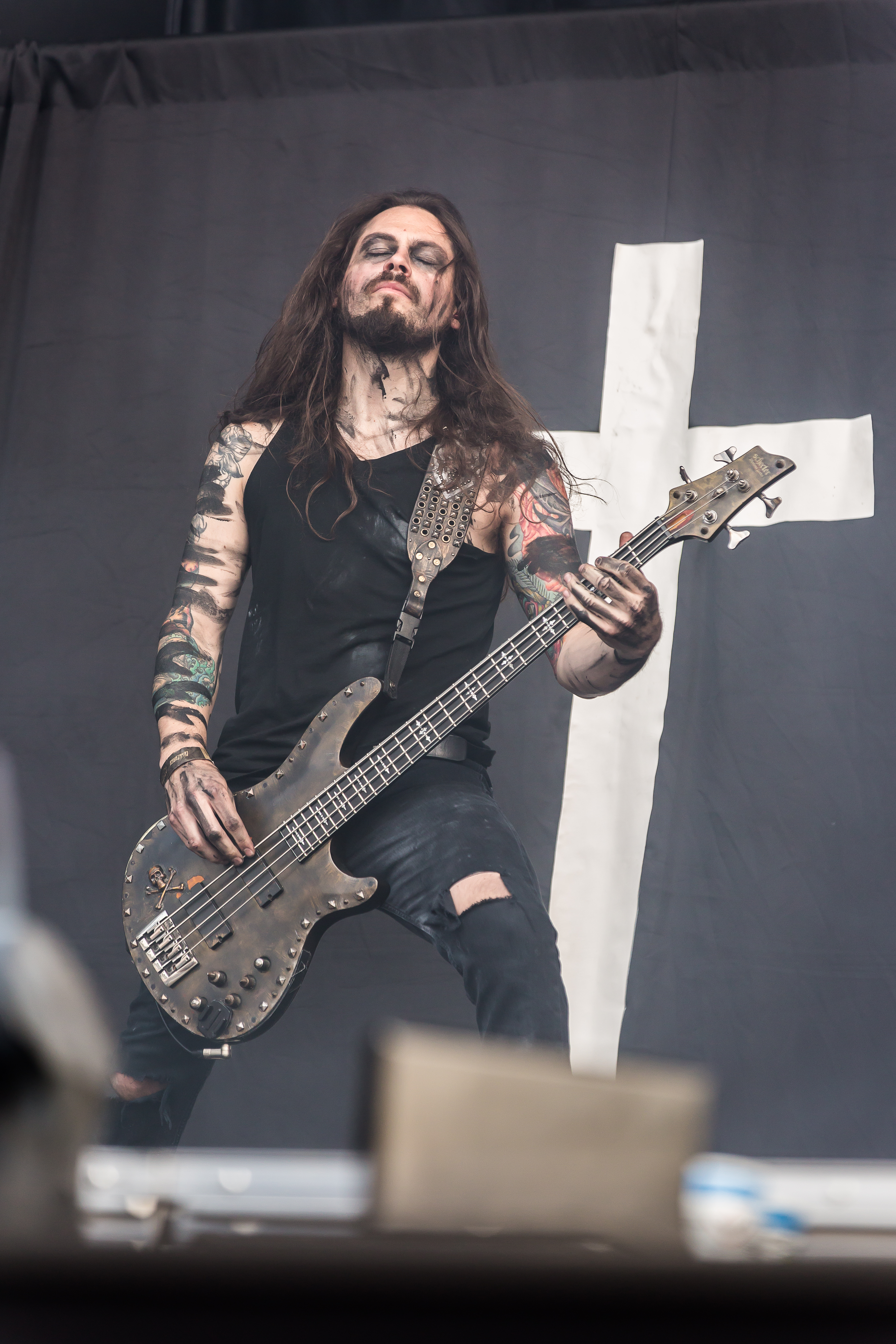
Travis Johnson

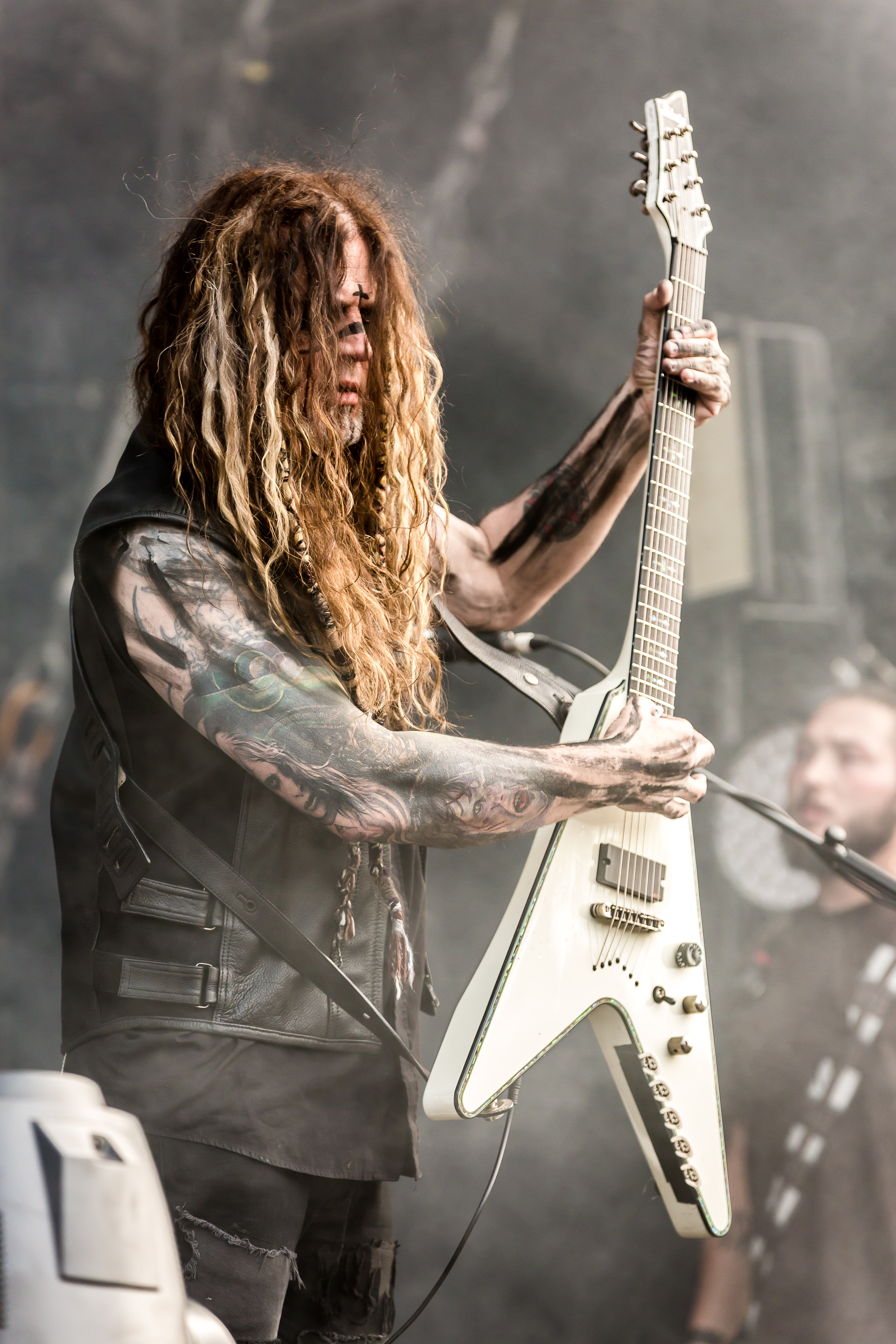
Randy Weitzel

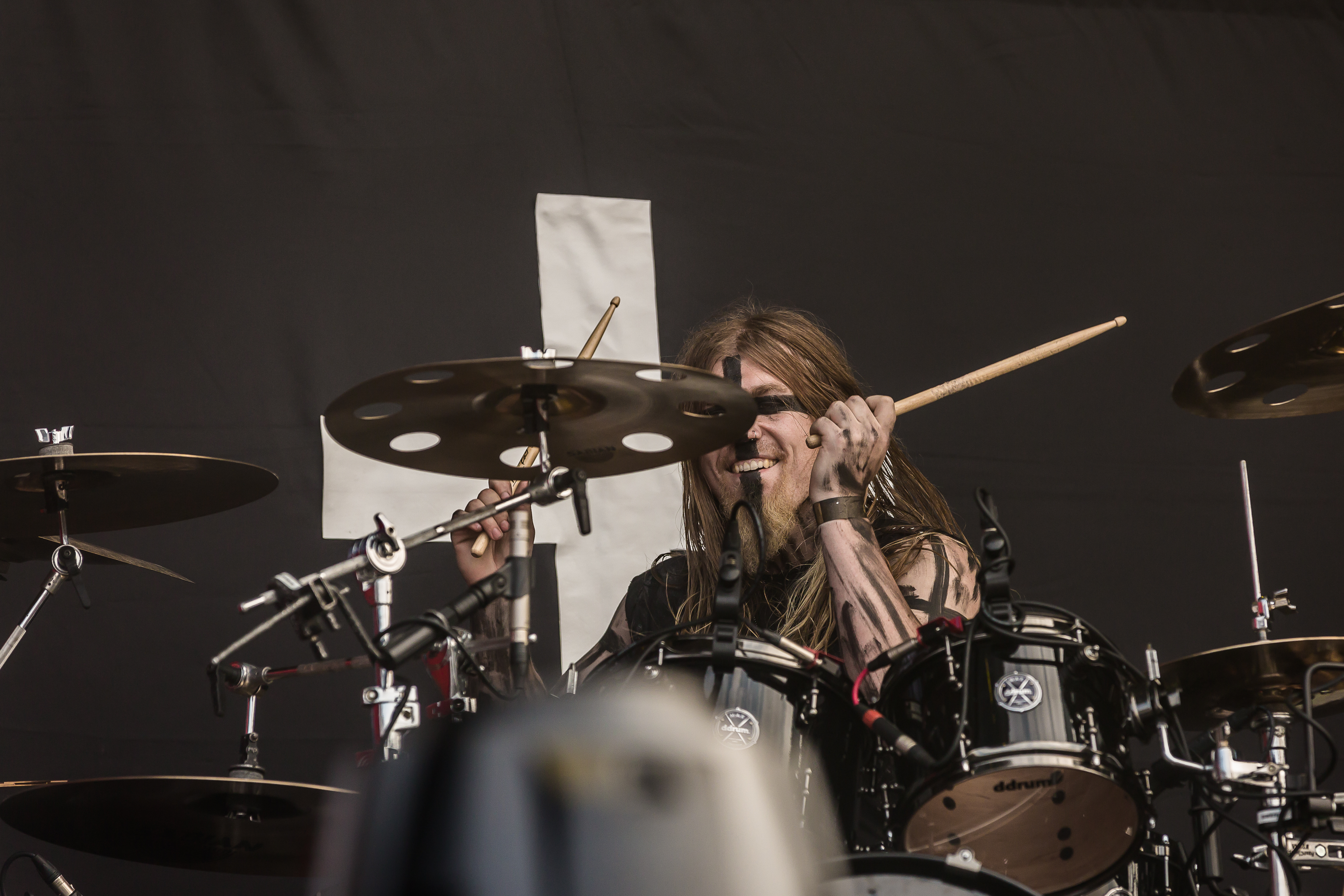
Kent Diimmel

Current

- Maria Brink – lead vocals, piano (2005–present)
- Chris Howorth – lead guitar, backing vocals (2005–present)
- Travis Johnson – bass, backing vocals (2010–present)
- Randy Weitzel – rhythm guitar, backing vocals (2011–present)
- Kent Diimmel – drums (2016–present)

Former

- Blake Bunzel – rhythm guitar, backing vocals (2005–2011)
- Josh Newell – bass, backing vocals (2005)
- Jesse Landry – bass, backing vocals (2005–2009)
- Kyle Konkiel – bass, backing vocals (2009–2010)
- Jeff Fabb – drums (2005–2011)
- Tom Hane – drums (2011–2016)

Timeline

== Discography ==
Studio albums

- Beautiful Tragedy (2007)
- The Dream (2008)
- A Star-Crossed Wasteland (2010)
- Blood (2012)
- Black Widow (2014)
- Ritual (2017)
- Mother (2020)
- Godmode (2023)
- Witch (2026)

== Awards and nominations ==
Alternative Press Music Awards

Year	Nominee / work	Award	Result	Ref.
2017	In This Moment	Best Hard Rock Artist	Nominated	
2017	In This Moment	Best Live Band	Nominated	

Grammy Awards

Year	Nominee / work	Award	Result	Ref.
2021	"The In-Between"	Best Metal Performance	Nominated	

Loudwire Music Awards

Year	Nominee / work	Award	Result	Ref.
2013	Maria Brink	Rock Goddess of the Year	Won	
2015	Maria Brink	Rock Goddess of the Year	Won	
2017	In This Moment	Hard Rock Artist of the Year	Nominated	

Revolver Golden God Awards

Year	Nominee / work	Award	Result	Ref.
2010	Maria Brink	Hottest Chick in Metal	Won	
