= Sex Metal Barbie =

Single by In This Moment

from the album Black Widow
- Released: November 4, 2014
- Length: 4:22
- Label: Atlantic
- Songwriter(s): In This Moment

In This Moment singles chronology
"Big Bad Wolf" (2014)	"Sex Metal Barbie" (2014)	"Oh Lord" (2017)

Music video
- "Sex Metal Barbie" on YouTube

"Sex Metal Barbie" is a song by American rock band In This Moment. It is the third single taken from the band's fifth album Black Widow.

== About the song ==
It was first premiered live at the band's Knotfest appearance on October 25, 2014. The single was released to online retailers as the fourth instant preorder download track on November 4, 2014. A pink limited edition 7" vinyl single was released for Record Store Day in 2015 on April 18, 2015. The single features the album version of the song and a remix.

The song is about the negative feedback the band has encountered online, especially towards lead vocalist Maria Brink. Brink's approach on building the song was to go online and search for awful comments and rumors that target her and turn them into lyrics.

It was revealed in March 2015 that the music video would be directed by Brink herself and shot in March after their European tour run.

== Track listing ==
All lyrics are written by Maria Brink; all music is composed by Chris Howorth, Brink, and Kevin Churko.

7" Vinyl
No.	Title	Length
1.	"Sex Metal Barbie"	4:22
2.	"Sex Metal Barbie" (Etnik Remix)	4:36

== Personnel ==
- Maria Brink – lead vocals, piano
- Chris Howorth – lead guitar, backing vocals
- Randy Weitzel – rhythm guitar
- Travis Johnson – bass guitar
- Tom Hane – drums, percussions

== Certifications ==
Region	Certification	Certified units/sales
United States (RIAA)	Gold	500,000^{‡}
^{‡} Sales+streaming figures based on certification alone.
