= Blood (In This Moment song) =

Single by In This Moment

from the album Blood
- Released: June 12, 2012
- Recorded: 2012
- Genre: Nu metal
- Length: 3:27
- Label: Century Media
- Songwriter(s): In This Moment

In This Moment singles chronology
"The Promise" (2010)	"Blood" (2012)	"Adrenalize" (2013)

"Blood" is a song by American rock band In This Moment. Released June 12, 2012, it is the first single released from their fourth studio album, Blood.

== Track listing ==
All lyrics are written by Maria Brink; all music is composed by In This Moment, Kevin Churko, Kane Churko.

No.	Title	Length
1.	"Blood"	3:27
Total length:		3:27

== About the song ==
'Blood' was one of the first two songs written for the upcoming album. It was written by bandmates Maria Brink and Chris Howorth along with longtime producer Kevin Churko and his son Kane. The song features Brink's intense vocals, heavy guitars and Electronica elements which gives the band a fresh new sound. The song first premiered live during their set on the Soundwave festival March 2, 2012. A stream of the studio version premiered in a Cage Match battle on WWBN on May 31, 2012. The single was released to all digital retailers on June 12, 2012.

== Music video ==
The music video was directed by Robert John Kley. A 1-minute teaser was released on the bands Facebook page on June 26, 2012, while the full video premiered on Loudwire July 10. The video features a Snow White theme with Maria Brink singing while sitting on a throne surrounded by women wearing white masks. Each character in the video represents a different emotion. "The video is about showing the different sides of me. The vulnerable, scared side. The empowering “conquer all” side. The really feminine Aphrodite side."

== Personnel ==
- Maria Brink – lead vocals, piano
- Chris Howorth – lead guitar, backing vocals
- Randy Weitzel – rhythm guitar
- Travis Johnson – bass
- Tom Hane – drums

== Reception ==
The single peaked at number 9 on the Billboard Mainstream Rock and Active Rock charts, and at number 37 on Rock Songs, making this the first In This Moment single to chart on Billboard. Spencer Kaufman of Loudwire said the song is "a passionate track both musically and lyrically".

Blood is also the best-selling single of all time for the band's label Century Media. On March 29, 2017, the single was certified gold by the Recording Industry Association of America (RIAA), moving 500,000 copies in the United States.

== Charts ==
Chart (2012)	Peak position
US Rock Songs (Billboard)	37
US Mainstream Rock (Billboard)	9
US Active Rock (Billboard)	9
US Rock Airplay (Billboard)	26
US Rock Digital Songs (Billboard)	49

== Certifications ==
Region	Certification	Certified units/sales
United States (RIAA)	Gold	500,000^{‡}
^{‡} Sales+streaming figures based on certification alone.
