= Mother (In This Moment album) =

2020 studio album by In This Moment

Studio album by In This Moment
- Released: March 27, 2020
- Recorded: October 2018 – May 2019
- Studio: The Hideout (Las Vegas); Chicago Recording Company (Chicago) (Note: Additional recording)
- Genre: Alternative metal; gothic metal; industrial metal
- Length: 54:25
- Label: Atlantic; Roadrunner
- Producer: Kevin Churko; Kane Churko

In This Moment chronology
| Ritual (2017) | Mother (2020) | Godmode (2023) |

Singles from Mother
- 1. "The In-Between" Released: January 22, 2020; 2. "Hunting Grounds" Released: February 21, 2020; 3. "As Above, So Below" Released: March 19, 2020

Mother is the seventh studio album by American rock band In This Moment, released on March 27, 2020, by Atlantic Records and Roadrunner Records. The album was produced by Kevin Churko and Kane Churko.

== Background and recording ==
On October 14, 2018, Chris Howorth posted a photo on his Instagram page stating that the band was working on their seventh album. On November 12, a short video with flickering and revolving text bearing the word "Mother" was uploaded to the band's official Instagram.

On February 17, 2019, Maria Brink posted a short video of herself heading to The Hideout Recording Studio in Las Vegas. A few days later, on February 24, Brink posted another video of the band working in the studio. Recording for the album was completed by the spring of 2019.

== Release and promotion ==
A headlining spring tour was kicked off on May 3, 2019, with a brand-new show which ties into the theme of the new record, "Mother", tentatively scheduled for release in fall 2019. On March 25, Disturbed announced a summer tour, with In This Moment to open for the second half of the tour. The tour also saw the premiere of three songs from the upcoming album including "Legacy" and "As Above, So Below". Throughout the Fall of 2019, the band embarked on a headlining tour through North America titled "Mother's House of Horror: A Traveling All Hallows Eve Masquerade" with Motionless in White, New Years Day, and Ded.

On September 15, the band announced that their new single "The In-Between" would be released on October 31 on Twitter. However, on November 1, they told fans on their Instagram that the release would be postponed until early 2020.

On November 12, another post on Instagram announced that March, 2020, will initiate a new tour, titled "The In-Between Tour" appearing together with Black Veil Brides, Ded, and Raven Black. The tour will be accompanied with the new album Mother.

In early January 2020, In This Moment posted several teasers, images and clips related to the then-upcoming album, Mother, on their official Instagram. On January 20, In This Moment posted a video clip for "The In-Between" with a caption reading "Wednesday the unveiling will be upon us". On January 21, the band pinned a post to their official Facebook page a link to a countdown timer on YouTube with the launch of "The In-Between" music video.

"The In-Between" music video, directed by Maria Brink and Robert Kley and edited by Maria Brink and Randy Weitzel, premiered on YouTube January 22, 2020 and generated over one million views in less than a week. Also on January 22, the band officially announced that their upcoming seventh studio album titled Mother is set for release on March 27, 2020. The official album art and track listing has also been released. On February 21, the band released the second single of the album titled "Hunting Grounds" featuring Joe Cotela of Ded. On March 19, a week before the album release, the band released their third single "As Above, So Below".

== Critical reception ==
Professional ratings
Review scores
| Source | Rating |
|---|---|
| Dead Press! | 4/10 |
| Distorted Sound | 9/10 |
| Kerrang! | 4/5 stars |
| New Noise | 5/5 stars |

The album received mostly positive reviews, but also mixed reviews from several critics. Carlos Zelaya from Dead Press! rated the album negatively calling it: "Mother is a record that will no doubt satisfy plenty of In This Moment's fanbase, but will unfortunately do absolutely nothing to win anyone else over." Distorted Sound scored the album 9 out of 10 and said: "Mother is an immersive experience that leaves you feeling out-of-body, it's crafty in how it executes its concepts and does not hold back both vocally and instrumentally. Arguably one of IN THIS MOMENT's best albums to date." Kerrang! gave the album 4 out of 5 with writer Steve Beebee stating: "The only thing certain about In This Moment is that nothing is ever certain. Just like their mesmerising live shows, their music defies prediction and is all the more gripping for it. Thus, aside from 'Lay Me Down''s instant rush, Mother moves away from the bewitching, gospel-tinged rock of 2017's Ritual. Gushing rivers of guitar combine with electronics and strange musical patterns that take time to coalesce, but when they do it's clear that Maria Brink's unique band have scored another win, brilliantly balancing Mother's fire and ice. The pyrotechnic cover of Queen's 'We Will Rock You', featuring Lzzy Hale and Taylor Momsen, contrasts beautifully with 'Legacy''s emotive lilt, while 'As Above, So Below' is sharp-fanged with irony and angst. It ends with an eerie interpretation of Mazzy Star's 'Into Dust', with lingering notes of darkness that will make you want to hit repeat and fall in love with it over and over again." New Noise praised the album saying, "Mother feels like a poignant testament to the energy that brings people together. Throughout 2020, as live music experiences on all scales remain in jeopardy, the album's feel takes on an even more special significance."

== Commercial performance ==
Mother debuted at number 34 on the US Billboard 200, selling 13,600 copies in its first week.

== Track listing ==
Mother track listing
| No. | Title | Writer(s) | Length |
|---|---|---|---|
| 1. | "The Beginning (Interlude)" | | 1:27 |
| 2. | "Fly Like an Eagle" (Steve Miller Band cover) | Steve Miller | 4:01 |
| 3. | "The Red Crusade (Interlude)" | | 0:44 |
| 4. | "The In-Between" | Maria Brink; Chris Howorth; Kevin Churko; Randy Weitzel | 4:14 |
| 5. | "Legacy" | Brink; Howorth; Kevin Churko; Ryan Spraker; Tom Peyton | 4:49 |
| 6. | "We Will Rock You" (Queen cover; featuring Lzzy Hale and Taylor Momsen) | Brian May | 3:05 |
| 7. | "Mother" | Brink; Howorth; Kevin Churko; Kane Churko | 4:09 |
| 8. | "As Above, So Below" | Brink; Howorth; Kevin Churko; Kane Churko | 4:09 |
| 9. | "Born in Flames" | Brink; Howorth; Kevin Churko; Kane Churko | 4:04 |
| 10. | "God Is She" | Brink; Howorth; Kevin Churko; Kane Churko | 4:39 |
| 11. | "Holy Man" | Brink; Howorth; Kevin Churko; Kane Churko; Weitzel | 3:35 |
| 12. | "Hunting Grounds" (featuring Joe Cotela of Ded) | Brink; Howorth; Kevin Churko; Kane Churko; Travis Johnson | 4:33 |
| 13. | "Lay Me Down" | Brink; Howorth; Kevin Churko; Kane Churko | 4:09 |
| 14. | "Into Dust" (Mazzy Star cover) | Hope Sandoval; David Roback | 6:41 |
| Total length: | | | 54:25 |

== Personnel ==
Credits adapted from the liner notes of Mother.

=== In This Moment ===
- Maria Brink – vocals
- Chris Howorth – guitar
- Randy Weitzel – guitar
- Travis Johnson – bass
- Kent Diimmell – drums

=== Additional musicians ===
- Lzzy Hale – guest vocals on "We Will Rock You"
- Taylor Momsen – guest vocals on "We Will Rock You"
- Joe Cotela of Ded – guest vocals on "Hunting Grounds"
- Laurie Barber – additional vocals on "Mother"
- Rita Brink – additional vocals on "Mother"

=== Technical ===
- Kevin Churko – production, engineering, mixing, mastering
- Kane Churko – production, engineering
- Tristan Hardin – additional engineering, Pro Tools editing
- Randy Weitzel – additional engineering, Pro Tools editing
- Kevin Sankel – additional engineering
- Jim Carroll – engineering assistance
- Jonathan Wyman – vocal recording

=== Artwork ===
- Virgilio Tzaj – art direction, design
- Brooke Shaden – cover image, booklet images
- Jeremy Saffer – booklet images

== Charts ==
=== Weekly charts ===
Weekly chart performance for Mother
| Chart (2020) | Peak position |
|---|---|
| Australian Albums (ARIA) | 58 |
| Austrian Albums (Ö3 Austria) | 46 |
| Canadian Albums (Billboard) | 65 |
| German Albums (Offizielle Top 100) | 38 |
| Hungarian Albums (MAHASZ) | 7 |
| Scottish Albums (Official Charts) | 18 |
| Swiss Albums (Schweizer Hitparade) | 46 |
| UK Albums (Official Charts) | 96 |
| UK Rock & Metal Albums (Official Charts) | 2 |
| US Billboard 200 | 34 |
| US Top Hard Rock Albums (Billboard) | 2 |
| US Top Rock Albums (Billboard) | 2 |

=== Year-end charts ===
Year-end chart performance for Mother
| Chart (2020) | Position |
|---|---|
| US Top Hard Rock Albums (Billboard) | 48 |
