= The Dream (In This Moment album) =

Studio album by In This Moment
- Released: September 30, 2008
- Recorded: June 2008
- Studios: The Wolves Den, Las Vegas
- Genres: Pop metal; hard rock; alternative metal; alternative rock
- Length: 42:50
- Label: Century Media
- Producer: Kevin Churko

In This Moment chronology
Beautiful Tragedy (2007)	The Dream (2008)	A Star-Crossed Wasteland (2010)

Alternative cover
- The Ultra Violet Edition

Singles from The Dream
- 1. "Forever" Released: August 19, 2008; 2. "Call Me" Released: May 26, 2009

The Dream is the second studio album by American rock band In This Moment. The Dream, unlike their last album, features more use of clean vocals and harmonization rather than Maria Brink's high-pitched screams. The first single, "Forever", premiered on the band's Myspace page in August. This is their last release with bassist Jesse Landry.

The album debuted at #73 on the Billboard Top 200 chart with first week sales of more than 8,000 copies.

== Background ==
=== Production ===
Writing for The Dream began in late 2007 and recording in Las Vegas, Nevada in June 2008. Kevin Churko was enlisted as producer, due to his diverse collaborations with artists such as Ozzy Osbourne, Shania Twain, and Britney Spears.

== Composition ==
=== Influences, style and themes ===
The album has been described as hard rock pop metal, alternative metal, and alternative rock. The most notable differences between The Dream and Beautiful Tragedy are the missing metalcore elements and the ditching of Maria Brink's screams in favor of more singing. The sound took a more '80s inspired hard rock approach mixed with "pop metal". Brink describes the change more challenging and comfortable. In an interview with MTV, Brink explains:

"As a vocalist, screaming always came really easy for me — it wasn't much of a challenge, it just came out of me. The singing vocals were always more challenging. People always complimented me on my scream, but I didn't get a lot of feedback on my singing, so I just wanted to challenge myself a lot more on this record."

Chris Howorth notes: "The basic idea behind calling our new album The Dream is that inside dreams anything can happen. All the things that seem impossible or unreachable in the 'real world' become a reality in your dreams. We wanted to make a record that you can lay down with, shut off the lights and have a total out-of-body experience. We also wanted the record to be like a rollercoaster ride with explosive highs, beautiful lows and everything in between."

== Release and promotion ==
=== Singles and videos ===
The Dream's first single was "Forever", which was released in August while the music video appeared weeks later. The video was directed by David Brodsky and features the band performing near the ocean and scenes of Maria underwater, which was filmed in a huge aquarium.

The band had been eyeing "Lost at Sea" or "Mechanical Love" as the second single, however, it was announced that their cover of Blondie's "Call Me" would replace a track off The Dream as a single. The "Call Me" single was released on iTunes on May 26, 2009. The video was shot in the UK and released on June 23, 2009.

=== Tours and performances ===
In support of The Dream, the band kicked off a North American trek with Five Finger Death Punch and Bury Your Dead in October. In early 2009, they joined as a support act for Mudvayne and Nonpoint before heading to the UK in the spring for the Give It a Name tour. They were also a part of the summer's Warped Tour lineup, performing at the Ernie Ball stage.

The band kicked off its first headlining tour called A Winter to Remember in November 2009 with Motionless in White, In Fear and Faith, and We Are Machines. Jesse Landry had parted ways with the band prior to the tour and has been replaced with Kyle Konkiel. The band placed a survey on their Myspace and allowed the fans to vote on what they wanted them to play. The setlist included "All for You", "Her Kiss", "Forever", "The Great Divide", "Beautiful Tragedy", "Prayers", "Into the Light", along with others. They finished with an encore of "Daddy's Falling Angel" complete with a circle pit.

=== Re-release ===
The Dream was first re-released in the UK on April 13, 2009, to promote the band's appearance on the Give It a Name tour. In addition to "Call Me", two B-sides from The Dream sessions were included as bonus tracks, "A Dying Star" and "Sailing Away". These two tracks were meant to be included on the album but later omitted in favor of "Lost at Sea" and "The Dream".

An expanded reissue called The Ultra Violet Edition was released in the US on June 30, 2009, in time for their Warped Tour appearance. It contains new artwork and an additional disc of unreleased tracks and video footage. It is now out of print.

== Critical reception ==
Professional ratings
Review scores
Source	Rating
About.com	3.5/5 stars
AllMusic	4/5 stars
The Cleveland Leader	(Favorable)
PopMatters	(7/10)

The album received generally positive reviews at the time of release. Alex Henderson from AllMusic said "But while some fans of Beautiful Tragedy will no doubt cry "sellout", the bottom line is that The Dream is a well-crafted, well-executed alternative rock/alternative metal effort... And even though some fans of metalcore and screamo will lament the band's pop-friendly makeover, that doesn't make The Dream any less excellent. Churko has clearly done right by In This Moment." Adrian Begrand from PopMatters wrote that the album "appeals to parents of Paramore fans, one that will have them remembering just how flat-out fun hard rock and pop metal was two decades ago. And with hooks like these, the kids just might realize the same as well."

== Track listing ==
All lyrics are written by Maria Brink; all music is composed by In This Moment and Kevin Churko.

Standard edition
No.	Title	Length
1.	"The Rabbit Hole"	1:00
2.	"Forever"	4:21
3.	"All for You"	4:55
4.	"Lost at Sea"	3:46
5.	"Mechanical Love"	3:37
6.	"Her Kiss"	4:30
7.	"Into the Light"	4:12
8.	"You Always Believed"	3:40
9.	"The Great Divide"	4:11
10.	"Violet Skies"	3:56
11.	"The Dream"	4:42
Total length:		42:50

Japanese edition bonus tracks
No.	Title	Length
12.	"Sailing Away"	4:00
13.	"Forever" (instrumental version)	4:21
14.	"Forever" (radio edit)	3:52

UK edition bonus tracks
No.	Title	Length
12.	"Call Me" (Blondie cover)	3:18
13.	"A Dying Star"	4:35
14.	"Sailing Away"	4:00

Ultra Violet edition bonus tracks
No.	Title	Length
12.	"Call Me" (Blondie cover)	3:18
13.	"Sailing Away"	4:00
14.	"A Dying Star"	4:36
15.	"Forever" (radio edit)	3:52
16.	"Call Me" (instrumental)	3:18

Limited edition bonus disc
No.	Title	Length
1.	"Forever" (radio edit)	3:52
2.	"Forever" (album version)	4:21
3.	"Forever" (instrumental)	4:21
4.	"A Journey Into the Rabbit Hole" (interview)	30:51

== Personnel ==
In This Moment

- Maria Brink – vocals, piano
- Chris Howorth – lead guitar
- Jesse Landry – bass guitar
- Blake Bunzel – rhythm guitar
- Jeff Fabb – drums

Additional personnel

- Album recorded at The Wolves Den, Las Vegas
- Additional recording conducted at The Tone Factory, Las Vegas
- Producer, engineer, mixer – Kevin "The Wolf" Churko
- Audio engineer – Jeff Welch
- Pro Tools editing – Mr. Kane Churko
- Additional engineer (at The Tone Factory) – Vinnie Castaldo
- Pro Tools, engineer, digital editing – Jeff "Tea Boy" Welch
- Photography – Hristo Shindov
- Clothing design – Sheri Bodell
- Makeup artist – Shyann Swisker
- Maria's hair – Chris Galeo, Jeffrey Kara Salon, Stephanie Hobgood
- Artwork and layout design – Anthony Clarkson
- A&R – George Vallee
- Management – Mercenary Management

== Charts ==
Chart performance for The Dream
Chart (2008–2009)	Peak position
UK Rock & Metal Albums (Official Charts)	32
US Billboard 200	73
US Top Hard Rock Albums (Billboard)	12
