= WWBM =

Yates, Georgia; United States
- Broadcast area: Newnan, Georgia
- Frequency: 89.7 MHz
- Branding: Asian FM

Programming
- Format: Defunct

Ownership
- Owner: Best Media, Inc.

Technical information
- Facility ID: 93444
- Class: A
- ERP: 1,000 watts
- HAAT: 98.0 meters
- Transmitter coordinates: 33°27′47.00″N 84°53′35.00″W

WWBM (89.7 FM) was a radio station formerly licensed to Yates, Georgia, United States. The station was owned by Best Media, Inc. The station broadcast from its transmitter near Georgia Power's Eugene A. Yates Plant south of Whitesburg.

== History ==
The station went on the air as WWBM on 1999-05-20.

The station's license was cancelled and its call sign deleted by the Federal Communications Commission per the licensee's request on January 3, 2012.
