= Whore (song) =

Single by In This Moment

from the album Blood
- Released: December 17, 2013
- Recorded: 2012
- Genre: Nu metal
- Length: 4:06
- Label: Century Media
- Songwriter: In This Moment

In This Moment singles chronology
"Adrenalize" (2013)	"Whore" (2013)	"Sick Like Me" (2014)

Music video
- "Whore" on YouTube

"Whore" is a song by American rock band In This Moment. Released December 17, 2013, it is the third and final single released from their fourth studio album, Blood.

== Background ==
Written by Maria Brink, Chris Howorth, Kevin Churko, and Kane Churko. Guitarist Chris Howorth says about the song, “It's really just about taking the power back from the word, and when you get past all the controversy of the word, you have a bombastic rock and roll song with crushing guitars and huge drums that will have you screaming whore at the top of your lungs!” Singer Maria Brink took a more artistic approach by posing nude for the song's online campaign. Brink writes on the band's Facebook post, "I decided to pose nude for the visual art for 'Whore' to evoke a raw vulnerable emotion. The word 'whore' written down my back, and the dunce cap symbolize me placing myself on the stake for those who are suffering and I can only hope to encourage at least one person to find the self worth and love they deserve to transcend out of a painful situation into a beautiful one. It is about finding our power and taking a stand.”

== Track listing ==
All lyrics are written by Maria Brink; all music is composed by In This Moment, Kevin Churko, Kane Churko.

No.	Title	Length
1.	"Whore"	4:06
2.	"Whore" (Nikka Bling Remix)	4:16
3.	"Blood" (Sluggo Remix)	3:53
4.	"Adrenalize" (Mr. Kane Remix)	3:54
5.	"The Blood Legion" (Mitch Marlow Remix)	4:48
Total length:		20:56

== Music video ==
The music video for the song was directed by Robert Kley and premiered on December 5, 2013. Kley has directed all of the videos for Blood. The video features Chris Motionless of Motionless in White as a man attending a strip club. Throughout the video Maria and her dancers don many different costumes and masks including a dunce cap, which is how the song has been performed onstage. By the end of the video, Motionless gets drugged and violated by Maria, then left tied up with the dunce cap on.

== Reception ==
On October 22, 2022, the single was certified platinum by the Recording Industry Association of America (RIAA), moving 1,000,000 copies in the United States.

== Personnel ==
- Maria Brink – lead vocals, piano
- Chris Howorth – lead guitar, backing vocals,
- Randy Weitzel – rhythm guitar
- Travis Johnson - bass guitar
- Tom Hane – drums, percussions

== Charts ==
Chart (2012)	Peak position
US Rock Songs (Billboard)	48
US Mainstream Rock (Billboard)	12
US Rock Airplay (Billboard)	49

== Certifications ==
Region	Certification	Certified units/sales
United States (RIAA)	Platinum	1,000,000^{‡}
^{‡} Sales+streaming figures based on certification alone.
