= Blood (In This Moment album) =

2012 studio album by In This Moment

Studio album by In This Moment
- Released: August 14, 2012
- Recorded: 2012
- Studio: The Hideout, Las Vegas
- Genre: Alternative metal; nu metal; industrial metal; metalcore
- Length: 48:14
- Label: Century Media
- Producer: Kevin Churko; Kane Churko

In This Moment chronology
A Star-Crossed Wasteland (2010)	Blood (2012)	Blood at the Orpheum (2014)

Alternative cover
- Special edition cover

Singles from Blood
- 1. "Blood" Released: June 12, 2012; 2. "Adrenalize" Released: February 1, 2013; 3. "Whore" Released: December 17, 2013

Blood is the fourth studio album by American rock band In This Moment, released on August 14, 2012, by Century Media Records. As has been the case with every In This Moment album, the record has a different sound, dropping many of the traditional metalcore elements in favor of electronic samples and further experimentation. This is the first album to feature rhythm guitarist Randy Weitzel, bassist Travis Johnson, and drummer Tom Hane.

This is the band's first album to be certified Gold by the Recording Industry Association of America (RIAA).

== Background ==
After over a year of touring to support their third studio album, A Star-Crossed Wasteland, the band was ready to start work on their upcoming fourth record. Lead vocalist Maria Brink revealed that this album would be darker and the first time that the band would be working with outside musicians. However, the band found themselves in a difficult position. Original members Blake Bunzel and Jeff Fabb left In This Moment to join American Idol finalist James Durbin's touring band. An official statement was released on their Facebook page in November announcing the departure. The statement also stated that the rest of the band members were ready to head back to the studio in the beginning of 2012 for a summer release. Guitarist Randy Weitzel was introduced during In This Moment's appearance at Shiprocked in December 2011 and drummer Tom Hane was introduced at Soundwave Festival in February 2012.

== Composition ==
The genre of the album has been described primarily as alternative metal, nu metal, industrial metal, and metalcore, featuring elements of electronic music.

== Release and promotion ==
Brink and Chris Howorth saw the band departures as something positive and that it would heavily influence the album. Brink said, "it's meant to be that they moved on and some other things in my life, it's so cool 'cause it's just like this brand new everything and it feels really awesome. And you're going to be able to hear it." Howorth said, "Jeff and Blake leaving kind of opened us up a bit and we went from the heart. We went a different route and it was more organic than ever before." Brink and Howorth reteamed with longtime producer, Kevin Churko, at the Hideout in Las Vegas to begin process on the album. Two songs emerged from those sessions, "Blood" and "Hello" (later became "From the Ashes"), which Howorth says brought them a new management deal with In De Goot.

"Blood" made its first appearance during In This Moment's set at the Soundwave festival on February 26, 2012. Other new songs that made it onto their First Blood Tour included "Adrenalize", "Whore", "Burn", and "You're Gonna Listen". The words to the album intro, "Rise with Me", were sung by Brink over Dredg's "What Have I Done" on their 2011 tour as an intro.

On May 14, 2012, it was announced that the album would be released on August 14, 2012, and that the first single, "Blood", would be released on June 12, 2012. A stream of the studio version premiered in a Cage Match battle on WWBM on May 31, 2012. "You're Gonna Listen" was available for streaming on July 3, 2012.

The album artwork and track listing for Blood were unveiled on June 18, 2012.

=== Reissue ===
A deluxe edition featuring a bonus disc of remixes was released on December 14, 2012. It was sold exclusively at all Hot Topic stores and was to contain the iTunes Store bonus track of Nine Inch Nails' "Closer"; however, the song was left off of the initial pressing. The bonus track was available as a free download to those who purchased the release. The error was corrected in later pressings. Blood was re-released on May 31, 2013 in Europe as a two-disc edition titled "Reissue & Bonus" featuring the same track listing as the Hot Topic release.

The album was reissued (this time as a special edition) for the third time on January 21, 2014. It contains the bonus track Nine Inch Nails' "Closer" and includes a DVD titled Blood at the Orpheum, which was shot on May 21, 2013, at the Orpheum Theater in Madison. This is the first live concert DVD shoot for the band. A cover of Nine Inch Nails' "Hurt" was performed at the show; however, it was omitted on the release. A Blu-ray version of the release was made available exclusively at Best Buy retail stores and the audio of the concert was released digitally at the same time titled Blood at the Orpheum.

== Critical reception ==
Professional ratings
Review scores
Source	Rating
About.com	3.5/5 stars
The Phoenix	3/4 stars

Chad Bowar from About.com wrote, "In This Moment is a polarizing band, and although there are a couple of marginal tracks, their fans will be pleased with Blood, which delivers all the elements they have come to expect along with some new twists. The band's accessible side will also continue to attract more radio play and attention from hard rock aficionados."

Ryan Reed from The Phoenix stated, "Blood sounds like R-rated Evanescence—a waste of such devilish talents. Elsewhere, In This Moment are up to some weird, wild, wonderful stuff."

== Commercial performance ==
Blood debuted at number 15 on the Billboard 200, selling approximately 20,000 copies in its first week. This marked the band's highest-peaking album until the release of Black Widow in November 2014. As of February 12, 2014, the album had sold over 227,000 copies. On May 10, 2017, it was certified Gold by the Recording Industry Association of America (RIAA).

== Track listing ==
No.	Title	Writer(s)	Length
1.	"Rise with Me"	Maria Brink; Chris Howorth; Kevin Churko	2:07
2.	"Blood"	Brink; Howorth; Kevin Churko; Kane Churko	3:27
3.	"Adrenalize"	Brink; Howorth; Kevin Churko; Mitchell Marlow	4:15
4.	"Whore"	Brink; Howorth; Kevin Churko	4:05
5.	"You're Gonna Listen"	Brink; Howorth; Kevin Churko; Kane Churko	3:43
6.	"It Is Written"	Brink; Howorth; Kevin Churko	0:30
7.	"Burn"	Brink; Howorth; Kevin Churko; Marlow	4:44
8.	"Scarlet"	Brink; Howorth; Kevin Churko	3:50
9.	"Aries"	Brink; Howorth; Kevin Churko	0:41
10.	"From the Ashes"	Brink; Howorth; Kevin Churko	4:26
11.	"Beast Within"	Brink; Howorth; Kevin Churko; Kane Churko	3:49
12.	"Comanche"	Brink; Howorth; Kevin Churko; Kane Churko	3:17
13.	"The Blood Legion"	Brink; Howorth; Kevin Churko; Marlow	4:29
14.	"11:11"	Brink; Howorth; Kevin Churko	4:51
Total length:			48:14

iTunes Store and special edition bonus track
No.	Title	Writer(s)	Length
15.	"Closer"	Trent Reznor	4:50
Total length:			53:04

Special edition DVD/Blu-ray: Blood at the Orpheum
No.	Title	Length
1.	"It Is Written"
2.	"Rise with Me"
3.	"Adrenalize"
4.	"Blazin'"
5.	"Beast Within"
6.	"Beautiful Tragedy"
7.	"Into the Light"
8.	"The Blood Legion"
9.	"Gunshow"
10.	"Whore"
11.	"Burn"
12.	"Blood"

Japanese edition bonus track
No.	Title	Writer(s)	Length
15.	"Remember" (B-side from A Star-Crossed Wasteland)	Brink; Howorth; Kevin Churko; Jeff Fabb; Blake Bunzel	4:23
Total length:			52:37

Hot Topic exclusive edition bonus disc
No.	Title	Writer(s)	Length
1.	"Blood" (Sluggo Remix)	Brink; Howorth; Kevin Churko; Kane Churko	3:53
2.	"Adrenalize" (Mr. Kane Remix)	Brink; Howorth; Kevin Churko; Marlow	3:55
3.	"Whore" (Nikka Bling Remix)	Brink; Howorth; Kevin Churko	4:16
4.	"The Blood Legion" (Mitch Marlow Remix)	Brink; Howorth; Kevin Churko; Marlow	4:49
Total length:			15:73

German reissue bonus disc
No.	Title	Writer(s)	Length
1.	"Closer"	Reznor	4:50
2.	"Blood" (Sluggo Remix)	Brink; Howorth; Kevin Churko; Kane Churko	3:53
3.	"Adrenalize" (Mr. Kane Remix)	Brink; Howorth; Kevin Churko; Marlow	3:55
4.	"Whore" (Nikka Bling Remix)	Brink; Howorth; Kevin Churko	4:16
5.	"The Blood Legion" (Mitch Marlow Remix)	Brink; Howorth; Kevin Churko; Marlow	4:49

== Personnel ==
Credits adapted from the liner notes of Blood.

=== In This Moment ===
- Maria Brink – lead vocals, piano
- Chris Howorth – lead guitar, backing vocals
- Travis Johnson – bass guitar
- Randy Weitzel – rhythm guitar
- Tom Hane – drums

=== Additional personnel ===
- Kevin Churko – production, recording, mixing, mastering
- Kane Churko – additional engineering, additional production
- Harvey Thibault – Pro Tools editing
- Nick Helbling – Pro Tools editing
- Mike McHugh – studio assistance
- Mitchell Marlow – additional programming, guitars (tracks 7, 13)
- Jake E. Lee – guest guitar solo (track 5)
- Anthony Clarkson – artwork, layout
- Robert Kley – band photos

== Charts ==
=== Weekly charts ===
Weekly chart performance for Blood
Chart (2012)	Peak position
Canadian Albums (Billboard)	15
Japanese Albums (Oricon)	124
UK Albums (Official Charts)	187
UK Rock & Metal Albums (Official Charts)	13
US Billboard 200	15
US Independent Albums (Billboard)	5
US Top Alternative Albums (Billboard)	5
US Top Hard Rock Albums (Billboard)	1
US Top Rock Albums (Billboard)	5

=== Year-end charts ===
2012 year-end chart performance for Blood
Chart (2012)	Position
US Independent Albums (Billboard)	46
US Top Hard Rock Albums (Billboard)	27

2013 year-end chart performance for Blood
Chart (2013)	Position
US Independent Albums (Billboard)	30
US Top Hard Rock Albums (Billboard)	19

=== Singles ===
Year	Single	Peak positions							
Year	Single	Hot Rock & Alternative Songs	Mainstream Rock Airplay	Rock & Alternative Airplay	Rock Digital Song Sales	Hard Rock Digital Song Sales	Hot Rock Songs	Active Rock	Heritage Rock
2022	"Blood"	37	9	26	49	5	37	8	25
2022	"Adrenalize"	-	20	31	-	-	-	18	-
2023	"Whore"	48	12	49	-	18	48	19	-

== Certifications ==
Certifications for Blood
Region	Certification	Certified units/sales
United States (RIAA)	Gold	500,000^{‡}
^{‡} Sales+streaming figures based on certification alone.
