= Adrenalize (song) =

Single by In This Moment

from the album Blood
- Released: February 1, 2013
- Recorded: 2012
- Length: 4:15
- Label: Century Media
- Songwriter(s): In This Moment

In This Moment singles chronology
"Blood" (2012)	"Adrenalize" (2013)	"Whore" (2013)

Music video
- "Adrenalize" on YouTube

"Adrenalize" is a song by American rock band In This Moment. Released on February 1, 2013, it is the second single released from their fourth studio album, Blood.

== Music video ==
The music video for "Adrenalize", directed by Robert John Kley, was released on April 9, 2013 and filmed at Linda Vista Community Hospital in Los Angeles. The video features Maria Brink being drugged by a masked nurse while tied to a hospital bed, the band performing throughout the facility, scantily clad men and women in animal and plain white masks (the latter are seen on the Blood album cover) partying and making out, and a black angel wandering the halls. The video ends with Brink becoming a new nurse.

The video was nominated for the Jack Richardson Producer of the Year Award.

== Personnel ==
- Maria Brink – lead vocals, piano
- Chris Howorth – lead guitar, backing vocals
- Randy Weitzel – rhythm guitar
- Travis Johnson - bass guitar
- Tom Hane – drums, percussions
- Ivan Moody — additional vocals

== Charts ==
Chart (2013)	Peak position
US Mainstream Rock (Billboard)	20
US Active Rock (Billboard)	18

== Certifications ==
Region	Certification	Certified units/sales
United States (RIAA)	Gold	500,000^{‡}
^{‡} Sales+streaming figures based on certification alone.
