= Beautiful Tragedy =

Studio album by In This Moment
- Released: March 20, 2007
- Recorded: 2006
- Studios: Trax East Studio, New Brunswick, New Jersey
- Genres: Metalcore; hard rock; melodic metalcore; post-hardcore
- Length: 41:43
- Label: Century Media
- Producer: Eric Rachel

In This Moment chronology
Beautiful Tragedy (2007)	The Dream (2008)

Singles from Beautiful Tragedy
- 1. "Prayers" Released: November 28, 2006; 2. "Beautiful Tragedy" Released: March 13, 2007; 3. "Surrender" Released: 2007

Beautiful Tragedy is the debut studio album by American rock band In This Moment. The album was promoted largely in part by an interview conducted on Sirius Satellite Radio's Hard Attack station, which performed several songs off Beautiful Tragedy and helped expose the band to the heavy metal scene.

The band's substantially heavy sound has allowed songs like the single "Prayers" and "Daddy's Falling Angel" frequent airplay on Hard Attack. However, with its strong employment of clean vocals, the title track, "Beautiful Tragedy", has also seen airplay on the Sirius hard rock station, Octane.

== Composition ==
The album has been described as metalcore, hard rock, melodic metalcore, and post-hardcore.

== Release and promotion ==
A music video was produced for "Prayers", which had the band performing in an ancient chapel. As described in the Hard Attack interview, during the video shoot, vocalist Maria Brink violently met face-first with a camera as it was closing in on the group. After having her nose laceration superglued and made up, Brink finished singing, often keeping her hair in her face to prevent noticeability of her nose. Upon release, the video for "Prayers" aired on Headbangers Ball.

The second commercial release was for the title track, "Beautiful Tragedy", which was also accompanied by a music video. Brink says of the song, "I kept thinking of these funerals where there are family members who haven't talked to each other for years. And then, when they lose someone, suddenly everyone loves each other. Sometimes, something dark brings out something beautiful." The single broke into the Top 40 Active Rock charts.

The success of the album led to a year of touring the US, Europe, and Japan with acts such as Within Temptation, Walls of Jericho, and Lacuna Coil. The band also scored opening slots for Megadeth, Ozzy Osbourne and Rob Zombie at the end of 2007 which increased their profile in the metal scene.

An unreleased track from the Beautiful Tragedy sessions called "Surrender" was released to online digital retailers in December 2007. The album was re-issued in 2022 by Brutal Planet Records on CD, LP, and cassette featuring new remastered songs and bonus tracks previously released in Japan.

== Critical reception ==
Professional ratings
Review scores
Source	Rating
About.com	3.5/5 stars
AllMusic	3.5/5 stars
Blabbermouth.net	7.5/10
MusicOMH	4/5 stars
PopMatters	7/10

The album received generally positive reviews upon release. Eduardo Rivadavia from AllMusic stated "True, with the exception of Brink's anomalous female presence, In This Moment tenders nothing truly original to the state of early-2000s metal on Beautiful Tragedy; but in a genre too often marred by the misuse of volume and aggression over substance, sometimes great songs should be cause enough for celebration."

== Track listing ==
All lyrics are written by Maria Brink; all music is composed by In This Moment.

No.	Title	Length
1.	"Whispers of October"	1:06
2.	"Prayers"	3:46
3.	"Beautiful Tragedy"	4:01
4.	"Ashes"	3:51
5.	"Daddy's Falling Angel"	4:12
6.	"The Legacy of Odio"	4:07
7.	"This Moment"	3:58
8.	"Next Life"	3:58
9.	"He Said Eternity"	3:51
10.	"Circles"	4:11
11.	"When the Storm Subsides"	4:43
Total length:		41:43

Japanese bonus tracks
No.	Title	Length
12.	"Beautiful Tragedy" (radio mix)	3:21
13.	"Have No Fear"	3:46
14.	"Beautiful Tragedy" (acoustic)	4:30
15.	"Surrender"	4:42
Total length:		58:02

2022 re-issued bonus tracks
No.	Title	Length
12.	"Beautiful Tragedy" (radio mix)	3:21
13.	"Have No Fear"	3:46
14.	"Beautiful Tragedy" (acoustic)	4:30
Total length:		53:20

== Personnel ==
In This Moment

- Maria Brink – lead vocals
- Chris Howorth – lead guitar
- Jesse Landry – bass guitar
- Blake Bunzel – rhythm guitar
- Jeff Fabb – drums

Additional personnel

- Recorded at Trax East Studio, New Brunswick, NJ
- Pre-production demos recorded at NRG
- Mastered at West West Side Music, New Windsor, NY
- Producer – Eric Rachel, In This Moment
- Pre-producer – Josh Newell, Preston Boebel
- Mastered by Alan Douches
- Engineer – Eric Kvortek, Eric Rachel
- Assistant engineer – Kyle Neeley
- Orchestra arranged by Michael Romeo
- Photography – Dean Karr, Olle Carlsson
- Artwork – Anthony Clarkson
- A&R – Phil Hinkle
- Management – Mercenary Management

== Charts ==
Chart performance for Beautiful Tragedy
Chart (2007)	Peak position
US Heatseekers Albums (Billboard)	14
US Independent Albums (Billboard)	35
