= Maria Brink =

American singer (born 1977)

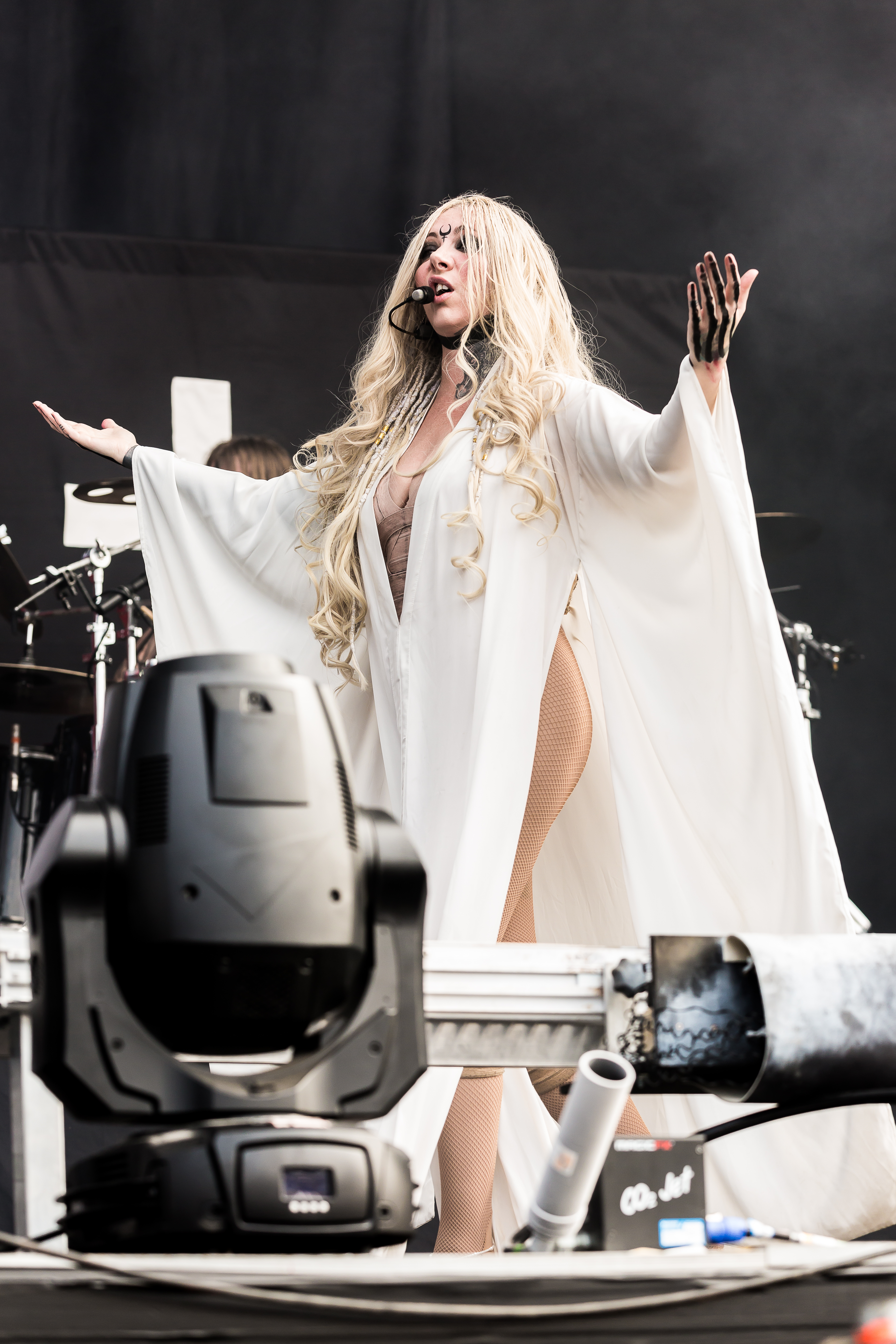
- Brink performing with In This Moment at With Full Force 2018
- Born: December 18, 1977 (age 48); Schenectady, New York, U.S.
- Occupations: Musician; singer; songwriter
- Years active: 2004–present
- Children: 1
- Musical career
- Origin: Los Angeles, California, U.S.
- Genres: Alternative metal; metalcore; hard rock; industrial metal; nu metal; gothic metal
- Instruments: Vocals; piano
- Member of: In This Moment
- Website: mariabrink.com

Maria Brink (born December 18, 1977) is an American singer and songwriter, best known as the frontwoman of the rock band In This Moment. The band has gone on to release nine studio albums and receive four nominations, two from Alternative Press Music Awards, one from Grammy Awards, and one from Loudwire Music Awards.

Brink has been awarded "Rock Goddess of the Year" in the third (2013) and fifth (2015) Annual Loudwire Music Awards, "Hottest Chick in Metal" in 2010, one of eleven women in heavy metal who matter by Yell! Magazine in 2012, and was recognized by Revolver Magazine as one of the "25 Hottest Chicks in Hard Rock & Metal".

== Early life ==
Brink was born on December 18, 1977, in Schenectady, New York; her father left the family when she was young. She was moved around to various parts of Schenectady including low income housing because the family had little money. Brink's mother introduced her to bands and artists such as Black Sabbath, Patti Smith, and the Rolling Stones. Brink became interested in performing at the age of 5.

== Career ==
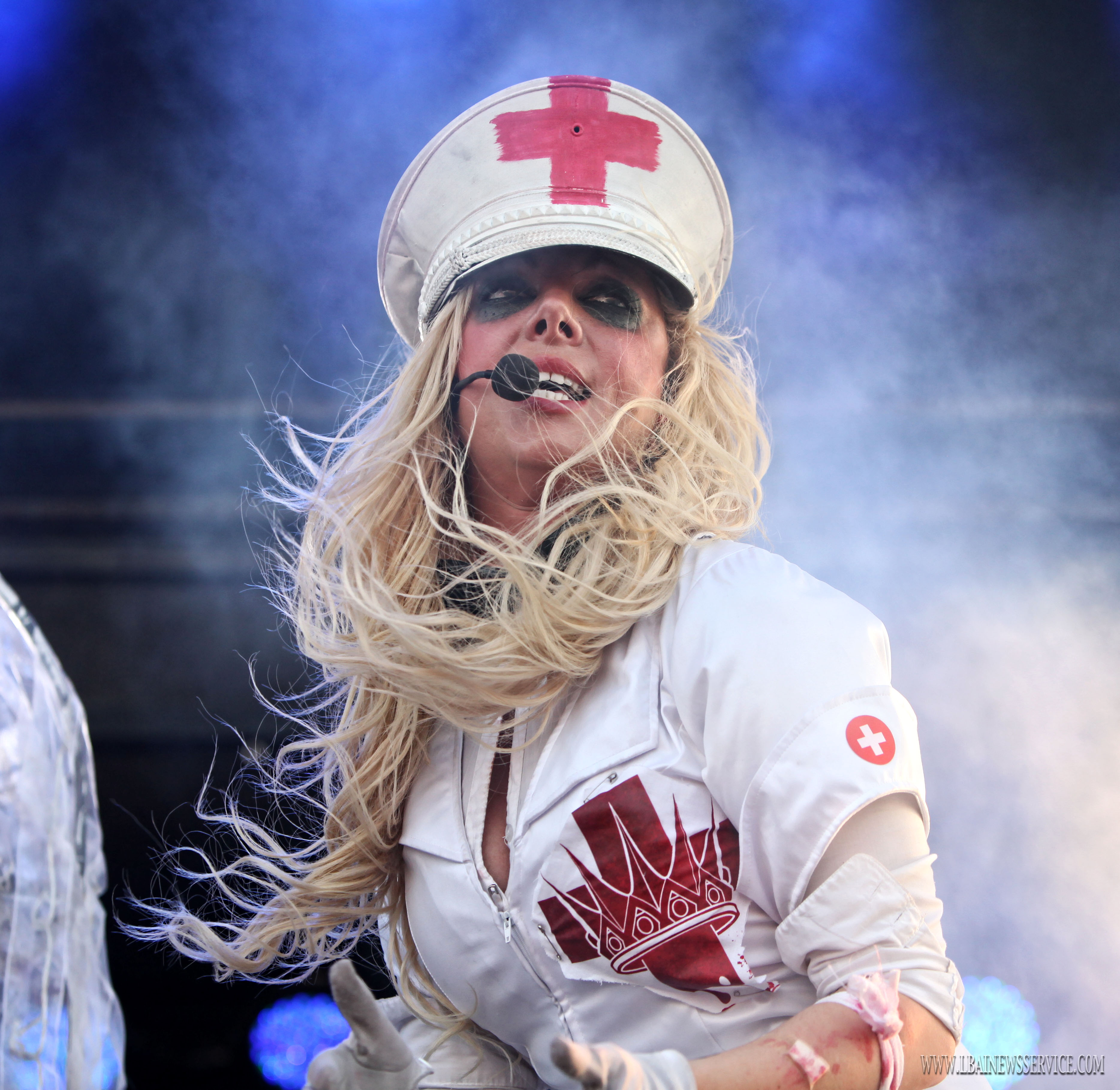
Brink performing at Fort Rock Festival 2013

=== Early career ===
The first band Brink was ever in was an Albany-based band called Pulse, before moving to California. In 2002, when she was 25, she moved to Los Angeles to find a band to work with. Before finding a band, she worked in stores, and sang in coffee shops and bars. In 2004, she met now-band member Chris Howorth at an audition. At first, Howorth rejected Brink for being a woman. Two weeks later, Howorth apologized and hired Brink as the singer. They formed the band Dying Star with drummer Jeff Fabb. They were later joined by guitarist Blake Bunzel and bassist Josh Newell. Soon after, the band changed their name to In This Moment.

=== In This Moment ===
Along with her band, she has released eight studio albums. They released their debut album, Beautiful Tragedy, on March 20, 2007. Their second studio album, The Dream, was released on September 30, 2008. The band's third album, A Star-Crossed Wasteland was released July 9, 2010. The band's fourth album titled Blood was released on August 14, 2012. Their fifth studio album titled Black Widow was released on November 17, 2014. Their sixth studio album, Ritual, was released on July 21, 2017. Their seventh studio album, Mother, was released on March 27, 2020. Their eighth, Godmode, was released on October 27, 2023. Their most recent studio album, Witch, was released on August 28, 2026.

Brink has been awarded "Rock Goddess of the Year" in the third (2013) and fifth (2015) Annual Loudwire Music Awards, "Hottest Chick in Metal" in 2010, one of eleven women in heavy metal who matter by Yell! Magazine in 2012, and was recognized by Revolver Magazine as one of the "25 Hottest Chicks in Hard Rock & Metal".

== Personal life ==
At age 15, Brink gave birth to a son, Davion. She worked to support herself and her son as well as helping her mother to overcome a drug addiction. She is also an aspiring artist/painter going by the alias of 'Maria Brink's Wonderland'. Brink was in a relationship with DevilDriver bassist, Jonathan Miller. Brink was reported in 2020 in a relationship with Ded vocalist Joe Cotela.

== Influences ==
Brink has cited Deftones, Pantera, and M83 as some of her favorite bands. She was inspired by vocalists Sarah McLachlan and Phil Anselmo. Outside of music, Brink has cited Queen Elizabeth I, Mother Teresa, Joan of Arc, and her two mothers as the women that influenced her the most.

== Discography ==
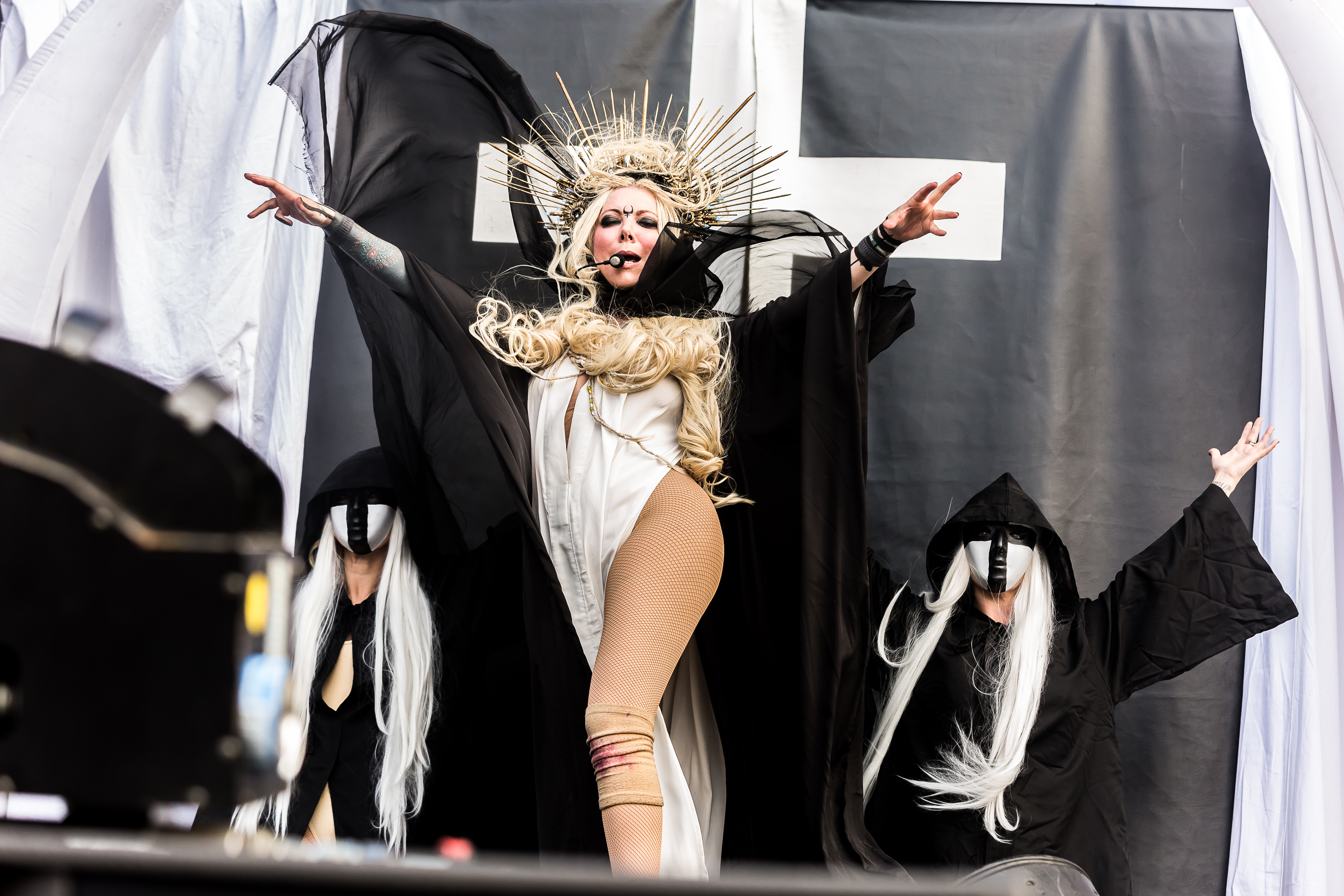
Brink performing at With Full Force 2018

=== In This Moment ===
==== Studio albums ====
- Beautiful Tragedy (2007)
- The Dream (2008)
- A Star-Crossed Wasteland (2010)
- Blood (2012)
- Black Widow (2014)
- Ritual (2017)
- Mother (2020)
- Godmode (2023)
- Witch (2026)

==== Live albums ====
- Blood at the Orpheum (2014)

==== Compilation albums ====
- Rise of the Blood Legion: Greatest Hits (Chapter 1) (2015)

=== Songs featured on ===
- "Here's to Us" (Guest Version) – Halestorm
- "Heaven's a Lie" – Manntis
- "Anywhere But Here" – Five Finger Death Punch
- "Big Mouth" – Red Dragon Cartel
- "Contemptress" – Motionless in White
- "Gravity" – Papa Roach
- "Criminal Conversations" – P.O.D.
- "New Devil" – Asking Alexandria
- "Love Song" – Ded
- "I Refuse" – Five Finger Death Punch
- "Villainous" - Eva Under Fire
