= Kevin Churko =

Canadian record producer (born 1968)

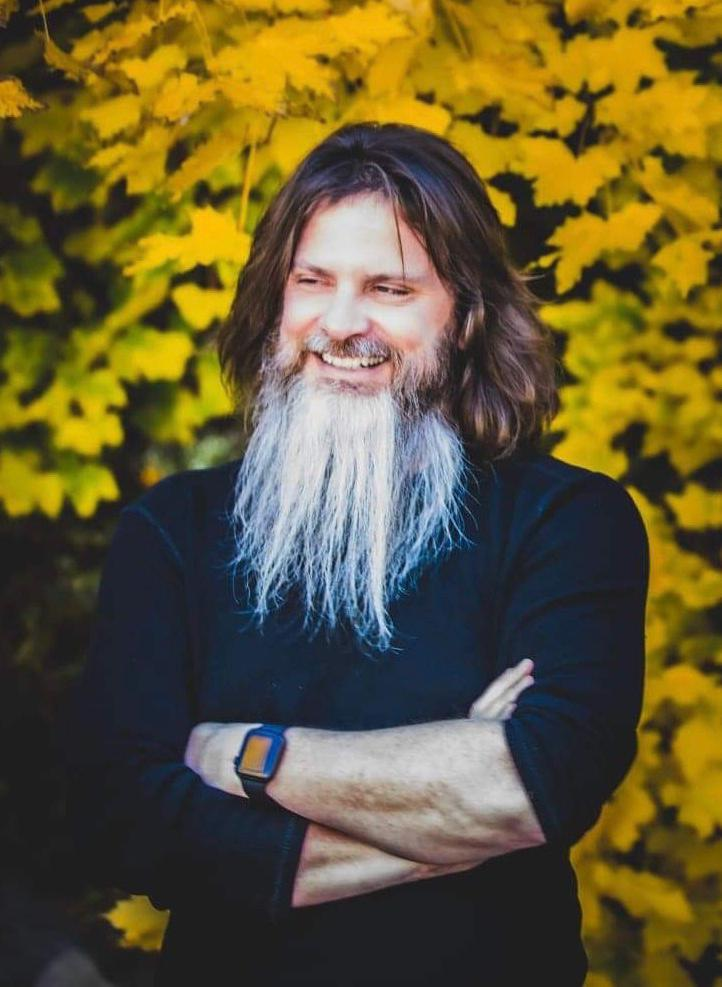

Background information
- Born: Kevin Gregory Churko; 19 January 1968 (age 58); Moose Jaw, Saskatchewan, Canada
- Genres: Rock; heavy metal; country; pop
- Occupations: Producer; audio engineer; musician
- Instruments: Bass; drums
- Years active: 1980s–present
- Website: kevinchurko.com

Kevin Gregory Churko (born 19 January 1968) is a Canadian record producer, sound engineer and musician best known for his work with artists such as Ozzy Osbourne, Papa Roach, Modern Science, Five Finger Death Punch, Disturbed, In This Moment, Shania Twain, Hellyeah, and Skillet. He resides in Las Vegas, where he works out of his private studio, "The Hideout". He is the father of record producer Kane Churko.

== Awards ==
Year	Nominee / work	Award	Result
2008	"I Don't Wanna Stop" / "God Bless the Almighty Dollar" – Ozzy Osbourne	Juno Award Recording Engineer of the Year	Won
2008	"I Don't Wanna Stop" / "God Bless the Almighty Dollar" – Ozzy Osbourne	Juno Award Jack Richardson Producer of the Year	Nominated
2008	"I Don't Wanna Stop" – Ozzy Osbourne	Grammy Award for Best Hard Rock Performance	Nominated
2009	"Disappearing" / "The Big Bang" – Simon Collins	Juno Award Recording Engineer of the Year	Won
2010	"Look Where You're Walking" – Modern Science / "The Dream" – In This Moment	Juno Award Jack Richardson Producer of the Year	Nominated
2010	"Scream" – Ozzy Osbourne	Grammy Award for Best Hard Rock Performance	Nominated
2011	"Let It Die" / "Life Won't Wait" – Ozzy Osbourne	Juno Award Recording Engineer of the Year	Won
2012	"American Capitalist" – Five Finger Death Punch	Revolver Golden Gods Awards Album of the Year	Nominated
2012	"American Capitalist" – Five Finger Death Punch	Radio Contraband Rock Radio Awards Album of the Year	Won
2012	"Coming Down" – Five Finger Death Punch	Radio Contraband Rock Radio Awards Song of the Year	Won
2013	"The Wrong Side of Heaven and the Righteous Side of Hell, Vol. 1" – Five Finger Death Punch	Loudwire Music Awards Rock Album of the Year	Nominated
2013	"Lift Me Up" – Five Finger Death Punch	Loudwire Music Awards Rock Song of the Year	Nominated
2013	"Blood" – In This Moment / "Coming Down" – Five Finger Death Punch	Juno Award Recording Engineer of the Year	Won
2013	"Blood / Adrenalize" – In This Moment	Juno Award Jack Richardson Producer of the Year	Nominated
2014	"The Wrong Side of Heaven and the Righteous Side of Hell, Vol. 1" – Five Finger Death Punch / "Stardust" – Gemini Syndrome	Juno Award Recording Engineer of the Year	Nominated
2014	"The Wrong Side of Heaven and the Righteous Side of Hell, Vol. 1" – Five Finger Death Punch	Revolver Golden Gods Album of the Year	Nominated
2014	"Lift Me Up" – Five Finger Death Punch	Revolver Golden Gods Song of the Year	Won
2014	"The Wrong Side of Heaven and the Righteous Side of Hell, Vol. 1" – Five Finger Death Punch	Bandit Rock Awards Best International Album	Won
2015	"Got Your Six" – Five Finger Death Punch	Loundwire Music Awards Best Rock Album	Nominated
2015	"Wash It All Away" – Five Finger Death Punch	Loudwire Music Awards Best Rock Song	Nominated
2015	"Immortalized" – Disturbed	SiriusXM Octane Music Awards Album of the Year	Won
2017	"The Sound of Silence" – Disturbed	Grammy Award for Best Hard Rock Performance	Nominated
2017	"The Sound of Silence" – Disturbed	iHeartRadio Music Awards Rock Song of the Year	Nominated
2017	"The Sound of Silence" – Disturbed	iHeartRadio Music Awards Best Cover Song of the Year	Nominated
2017	"The Sound of Silence" – Disturbed	Loudwire Music Awards Best Rock Song	Nominated
2017	"Unleashed" – Skillet	Dove's Rock/Contemporary Album	Nominated
2018	"Unleashed Beyond" – Skillet	Dove's Rock/Contemporary Album	Won
2019	"And Justice for None..." – Five Finger Death Punch	Bandit rock Awards Best International Album	Won
2020	"Victorious" – Skillet	Dove's Rock/Contemporary Album	Won
2021	"The In-Between" – In This Moment	Grammy's Best Metal Performance	Nominated

== Discography ==
- 2000 – Britney Spears – Oops!... I Did It Again
- 2000 – The Corrs – In Blue
- 2002 – Shania Twain – Up
- 2002 – Michael Bolton – Only a Woman Like You
- 2002 – Celine Dion – A New Day Has Come
- 2004 – Robert Downey Jr. – The Futurist
- 2005 – Ozzy Osbourne – Under Cover
- 2005 – Ringo Starr – Choose Love
- 2007 – Ozzy Osbourne – Black Rain
- 2008 – Simon Collins – U-Catastrophe
- 2008 – In This Moment – The Dream
- 2009 – Modern Science – Modern Science
- 2009 – Five Finger Death Punch – War Is the Answer
- 2010 – Ozzy Osbourne – Scream
- 2010 – In This Moment – A Star-Crossed Wasteland
- 2010 – Slash – Slash
- 2010 – Hinder – All American Nightmare
- 2011 – Emerson Drive – Decade of Drive
- 2011 – Five Finger Death Punch – American Capitalist
- 2012 – Kobra and the Lotus – Kobra and the Lotus
- 2012 – In This Moment – Blood
- 2013 – Rob Zombie – Venomous Rat Regeneration Vendor
- 2013 – Five Finger Death Punch – The Wrong Side of Heaven and the Righteous Side of Hell, Volume 1
- 2013 – Asking Alexandria – From Death to Destiny
- 2013 – Five Finger Death Punch – The Wrong Side of Heaven and the Righteous Side of Hell, Volume 2
- 2013 – Gemini Syndrome – Lux
- 2014 – Ozzy Osbourne – Memoirs of a Madman
- 2014 – Hellyeah – Blood for Blood
- 2014 – In This Moment – Black Widow
- 2015 – Papa Roach – F.E.A.R
- 2015 – Apocalyptica – Shadowmaker
- 2015 – Disturbed –Immortalized
- 2015 – Five Finger Death Punch – Got Your Six
- 2015 – Escape the Fate – Hate Me
- 2016 – Hellyeah – Undeniable
- 2016 – Skillet – Unleashed
- 2016 – Gemini Syndrome – Memento Mori
- 2017 – In This Moment – Ritual
- 2018 – Five Finger Death Punch – And Justice for None
- 2018 – Halestorm – Vicious
- 2018 – Disturbed – Evolution
- 2019 – Hellyeah – Welcome Home
- 2019 – Skillet – Victorious
- 2020 – Five Finger Death Punch – F8
- 2020 – In This Moment – Mother
- 2020 – Cory Marks – Who I Am
- 2021 – Ded – School of Thought
- 2022 – Skillet – Dominion
- 2022 – Five Finger Death Punch – AfterLife
- TBA – Five Finger Death Punch – The Way of the Fist: 15th Anniversary Re-recording
- 2024 - Cory Marks - Sorry for Nothing
- 2025 - Five Finger Death Punch - TBA
