= Breaking the Silence (Firewind song) =

Single by Firewind

from the album Allegiance
- Released: (Greece) 2 July 2007
- Recorded: Studio Fredman in Göteborg, Sweden; February 2007
- Genre: Power metal
- Length: 4:03
- Label: Century Media
- Songwriter(s): Apollo Papathanasio, Mark Cross, Tara Teresa
- Producer(s): Fredrik Nordström

Firewind singles chronology
"Falling to Pieces" (2006)	"Breaking the Silence" (2007)	"Mercenary Man" (2008)

"Breaking the Silence" is the fifth track off Greek power metal band Firewind's fourth studio album Allegiance. It was released as a single to the market of Greece on 2 July 2007. Tara Teresa's vocal performance on the song has been described as "more characteristic of gothic metal and gothic rock than power metal" and compared that of Evanescence's Amy Lee.

== Track listing ==
1. "Breaking the Silence" – 4:03
2. "Healing Tool" (Papathanasio, Mark) – 4:43
3. "Till the End of Time" (Papathanasio, Gus G.) – 4:58 (live)
4. "Breaking the Silence" (Ullaeus) – 4:03 (Video clip)

== Personnel ==
- Apollo Papathanasio – vocals
- Gus G. – guitars
- Babis Katsionis – keyboards
- Petros Christodoylidis – bass
- Mark Cross – drums
- Tara Teresa – guest vocals
