= Falling to Pieces (Firewind song) =

Single by Firewind

from the album Allegiance
- B-side: "Teenage Idol"
- Released: 13 June 2006
- Recorded: CD, Digital
- Genre: Power metal
- Length: 4:05
- Label: Century Media
- Songwriter(s): Gus G.
- Producer(s): Gus G.

Firewind singles chronology
"Falling to Pieces" (2006)	"Breaking the Silence" (2007)

"Falling to Pieces" was the first single by Greek power metal band Firewind, released on 13 June 2006 through Century Media Records. The music video was directed by Patric Ullaeus, and the song peaked at No. 11 in the Greek Singles Chart.

The song also appears on the metal compilation album Metal for the Masses.

== Track listing ==
1. "Falling to Pieces" – 3:20 (Gus G.)
2. "Teenage Idol" – 4:28 (Blackfoot)
3. "Demon Nights" – 4:23 (Katsionis, Gus G.)

== Personnel ==
- Apollo Papathanasio – vocals
- Gus G. – guitars
- Babis Katsionis – keyboards
- Petros Christodoylidis – bass
- Mark Cross – drums
