= Mercenary Man =

Single by Firewind

from the album The Premonition
- Released: 25 February 2008
- Recorded: December 2007 at Studio Fredman in Göteborg, Sweden
- Genre: Power metal
- Length: 3:27
- Label: Century Media
- Songwriter(s): Gus G., Apollo Papathanasio
- Producer(s): Fredrik Nordström

Firewind singles chronology
"Breaking the Silence" (2007)	"Mercenary Man" (2008)	"'World on Fire'" (2010)

"Mercenary Man" is the third track on the Greek power metal band Firewind's fifth studio album The Premonition. It was released for streaming on Firewind's Myspace page on February 2, 2008 but only physically released as a single in Greece, on February 25, 2008. The song was also released on several models of Walkman in 2008. The song shares a title with a song by British glam rock band Geordie, from their 1974 album Don't Be Fooled by the Name.

== Music video ==
The music video for "Mercenary Man" was filmed in Sweden and produced by Patric Ullaeus.

== Track list ==
1. "Mercenary Man" – 3:28
2. "My Loneliness" – 4:04
3. "Spirits in a Digital World" – 4:04
4. "Mercenary Man [Acoustic]" – 3:54

== Charts ==
- (Greece) Greek Top 50 – #5
