= Nightfall (band) =

Greek extreme metal band

- Origin: Athens, Greece
- Genres: Gothic metal, melodic death metal, symphonic black metal
- Years active: 1991–2006, 2010–present
- Labels: Holy, Black Lotus, Metal Blade, Season of Mist
- Members: Efthimis Karadimas; Mike Galiatsos; Kostas Kyriakopoulos; Fotis Benardo; Vasiliki Billie Biza

Nightfall is a Greek extreme metal band from Athens. Formed by vocalist/bassist/keyboardist Efthimis Karadimas in 1991, the group is signed to Season of Mist. They are considered forerunners to a "mediterranean way to black metal" with Inchiuvatu and Moonspell.

== History ==
Frontman, bassist and keyboardist Efthimis Karadimas formed Nightfall in 1991. A few months later, Karadimas produced Nightfall's only demo tape, Vanity. The four-track demo drew the attention of French label Holy Records. A deal resulted in the debut release for Nightfall and Holy Records, Parade into Centuries, in 1992. The pioneering release was a success for both parties. This established a tradition of French labels releasing Greek metal albums.

Nightfall stayed with Holy Records throughout the decade, releasing 1994's Macabre Sunsets, 1995's Athenian Echoes, 1997's Lesbian Show, and 1999's Diva Futura, backed by European tours. Line-up changes occurred in almost every release. Karadimas remained the only constant member. Early on, Chris Adamou played rhythm guitar and Costas Savvidis drummed, while later Jim Agelopoulos and Phil Anton took over guitars. Bob Katsionis joined on keyboards for their summer of 2001 Wacken appearance, with drummer Mark Cross and lead guitarist Mike Galiatsos. Katsionis later played guitars too, and himself and Cross later performed with Greek power metal outfit Firewind, the main band of guitarist Gus G.

During the next few years, the band changed direction and signed with Greek label Black Lotus Records, with whom Nightfall released 2003's I Am Jesus and 2005's Lyssa: Rural Gods and Astonishing Punishments. George Bokos played guitar on Lyssa. In 2005, the band stopped performing live, and Bokos joined Rotting Christ. That year, drummer George Kollias, who had replaced Cross years prior and appeared on both albums, joined Nile.

The band had apparently split up (although no official announcement was made). In early 2009, Stathis Kassios (known to Efthimis Karadimas from his on-stage keyboard services in the previous years) introduced American guitarist Evan Hensley to Karadimas to convince him to record new compositions together. German drummer and producer Jörg Uken was in touch with Karadimas, and, in early 2010, a new line-up was announced, which led to a deal with Metal Blade Records.

Metal Blade released Astron Black and the Thirty Tyrants in August, 2010. The album was well-received, garnering praise from international critics, and included artwork by artist Travis Smith.

In 2011, the band added guitarist Constantine and bassist Stathis Ridis.

After their 2013 album, Cassiopeia, Nightfall went on hiatus. In June 2020, the band announced their return to live performances through their official Facebook page. The band's lineup, apart from Karadimas on vocals and bass, included Mike Galiatsos and Kostas Kyriakopoulos on guitars, and drummer Fotis Bernardo of Septicflesh.

In July 2020, Nightfall announced a deal with Season of Mist, and that they were working on an album that would be released in early 2021. Season of Mist announced that it had acquired distribution rights for the band's Holy Records catalog.

Nightfall released At Night We Prey on March 5, 2021.

== Band members ==
Current members

- Efthimis Karadimas - vocals (1991–present), keyboards (1991-1992, 1999–2004, 2020-present), bass (1991-1999, 2002–2004, 2005–2010, 2020–2021)
- Kostas Kyriakopoulos - guitars (2020–present), bass (2004–2005, 2020–2021)
- Fotis Benardo - drums (2020–present)
- Vasiliki Biza - bass (2021–present)

Former members

- Chris Adamou - guitars (1991–1995)
- Costas Savidis - drums (1991–1995)
- Mike Galiatsos - guitars (1991–1999, 2020–2022)
- George Aspiotis - keyboards, piano, effects (1992–1999)
- Jim Agelopoulos - guitars (1996-1997)
- Phil Anton - guitars (1998–2000, died in 2023)
- Bob Katsionis - guitar, keyboards (1999–2005)
- Marc McKnight - bass (1999–2002)
- Mark Cross - drums (1999-2000)
- George Kollias - drums (2000–2005)
- George Bokos - guitar (2002–2005)
- Fotis Anagnostou - bass (1999, died in 2021)
- Nikos Papadopoulos - bass (2010-2011)
- Evan Hensley - guitars (2009–2020)
- Constantine - guitars (2011–2020)
- Stathis Ridis - bass (2011–2020)
- Stathis Kassios - keyboards (2004–2020)
- Jörg Uken - drums (2009–2020)

== Discography ==
- Parade into Centuries (1992)
- Macabre Sunsets (1994)
- Eons Aura EP (1995)
- Athenian Echoes (1995)
- Lesbian Show (1997)
- Electronegative (1999)
- Diva Futura (1999)
- I Am Jesus (2003)
- Lyssa: Rural Gods and Astonishing Punishments (2004)
- Astron Black and the Thirty Tyrants (2010)
- Cassiopeia (2013)
- At Night We Prey (2021)
- Children of Eve (2025)
