= Savage Souls =

Savage Souls can refer to:

- Savage Souls (album) a 2006 album by German power metal band Mystic Prophecy
- Savage Souls (film), a 2001 film directed by Raúl Ruiz
