= Gods, Myths & Titans =

Studio album by Firewind
- Released: 19 February 2027
- Genre: Power metal
- Label: BlkIIBlk
- Producers: Dennis Ward, Gus G

Firewind chronology
Stand United (2024)	Gods, Myths & Titans (2027)

Singles from Gods, Myths & Titans
- 1. "The Legend of Achilles" Released: 10 September 2026; 2. "Firegod" Released: 10 November 2026

Gods, Myths & Titans is the eleventh studio album by Greek power metal band Firewind. The album will be released on 19 February 2027, by BlkIIBlk. It is the second album to feature vocalist Henning Basse, marking his return to the band, and also the band's first album to be released through BlkIIBlk, with whom the band signed in 2025. The album is a concept album about Greek mythology.

== Background ==
On 1 March 2024, Firewind released their tenth studio album Stand United. On 20 November 2025, the band announced that Herbie Langhans had parted ways with the band, and that Basse had returned as the lead vocalist. The following day, they signed a record deal with BlkIIBlk.

== Release and promotion ==
On 10 September 2026, Firewind announced their eleventh studio album Gods, Myths & Titans alongside its lead single "The Legend of Achilles". On 10 November, the band released the second single "Firegod".

== Track listing ==
No.	Title	Length
1.	"Prologue Sacrifice"
2.	"Firegod"	3:50
3.	"I Will Sail On"
4.	"The Legend of Achilles"	4:27
5.	"Cries of a Mortal"
6.	"Queen of the Underworld"
7.	"Prelude the Chosen One"
8.	"Under Aegean Skies"
9.	"A King Dethroned"
10.	"Unbreakable"
11.	"Titans Fall"
12.	"Epilogue"

== Personnel ==
- Henning Basse – vocals
- Gus G – guitars, keyboards, production
- Petros Christodoulidis – bass
- Johan Nunez – drums
- Dennis Ward – Mixing, mastering, production
