= Stand United =

- Artwork by Costin Chioreanu

Studio album by Firewind
- Released: 1 March 2024
- Studios: Kangaroo, Germany (Drums); Blackfire, Greece (Guitars, keyboards); H-Factor, Hannover (Vocals)
- Genres: Power metal, heavy metal
- Length: 43:14
- Label: AFM Records
- Producers: Dennis Ward, Gus G

Firewind chronology
Firewind (2020)	Stand United (2024)	Gods, Myths & Titans (2027)

Stand United is the tenth studio album by Greek power metal band Firewind. It was released on 1 March 2024, and features the same lineup as the bands eponymous previous studio album, Firewind; the first to do so since Days of Defiance. It is also the second and last album to feature Herbie Langhans on vocals. The opening track "Salvation Day" was released as a single with a music video ahead of the albums release on 13 October 2023.

== Track listing ==
No.	Title	Writer(s)	Length
1.	"Salvation Day"	Gus G, Herbie Langhans	4:24
2.	"Stand United"	Gus G, Langhans, Dennis Ward	4:31
3.	"Destiny Is Calling"	Gus G, Langhans, Ward	3:56
4.	"The Power Lies Within"	Gus G, Langhans	4:21
5.	"Come Undone"	Gus G, Langhans	4:46
6.	"Fallen Angel"	Gus G, Langhans	3:38
7.	"Chains"	Gus G, Langhans, Ward	4:55
8.	"Land of Chaos"	Gus G, Langhans	3:55
9.	"Talking In Your Sleep" (The Romantics cover)	Coz Canler, Jimmy Marinos, Mike Skill, Peter Solley, Wally Palmar	4:12
10.	"Days of Grace"	Gus G, Langhans	4:47

== Personnel ==
- Herbie Langhans – vocals, vocal arrangement
- Gus G – guitars, keyboards, production
- Petros Christodoulidis – bass
- Johan Nunez – drums
- Dennis Ward – Mixing, mastering, production

== Charts ==
Chart (2017)	Peak position
German Albums (Offizielle Top 100)	36
Swiss Albums (Schweizer Hitparade)	45
