= Firewind (album) =

Studio album by Firewind
- Released: 15 May 2020
- Recorded: 2019–2020
- Studio: HOFA-Studios, Karlsdorf (drums); Blackfire, Greece (guitars, bass, keyboards); Valve Studio, Thessaloniki (acoustic guitars); H-Factor, Hannover (Vocals)
- Genre: Hard rock, power metal
- Length: 47:22
- Label: AFM Records
- Producer: Dennis Ward, Gus G

Firewind chronology
Immortals (2017)	Firewind (2020)	Stand United (2024)

Professional ratings
Review scores
Source	Rating
Blabbermouth.net	8/10

Firewind is the self-titled ninth studio album by Greek heavy metal band Firewind. It was released on 15 May 2020, and is their first album with new vocalist Herbie Langhans.

== Background ==
In May 2019, it was announced by Gus G. that they would enter the studio to start working on a follow-up to their eighth album Immortals in August of that year. However, on 9 March 2020, it was announced that Bob Katsionis would be leaving the band in order to focus on his studio work and his other projects. They also parted ways with singer Henning Basse, because of personal reasons, which may prevent him from continuing with the band, with Herbie Langhans, who worked with Sinbreed and Avantasia, replacing Basse on vocals. They also announced that the next album, with vocals finished by Langhans and most of the keyboards performed by Gus G., would be released in 2020. Gus G. explained that "once Herbie stepped in we had about six or seven weeks to complete the whole project. We had the music all recorded and done, but we had to write the lyrics for seven or eight songs, plus the vocal melodies. I had three already, and the rest was up to Herbie. His work ethic was amazing – he worked every day and he would be in touch sending me versions of the songs the whole time. And even though we worked from a distance, he was really quick and really professional. That was also one more thing, another reason why I thought he was the perfect guy for the job."

The album was released during the Coronavirus pandemic that caused the band's world tour with Symphony X and Primal Fear to be postponed until 2021.

== Track listing ==
No.	Title	Length
1.	"Welcome to the Empire"	5:12
2.	"Devour"	3:45
3.	"Rising Fire"	3:31
4.	"Break Away"	5:13
5.	"Orbitual Sunrise"	4:44
6.	"Longing to Know You"	4:28
7.	"Perfect Stranger"	4:10
8.	"Overdrive"	4:25
9.	"All My Life"	3:55
10.	"Space Cowboy"	3:12
11.	"Kill the Pain"	4:47
Total length:		47:22

== Personnel ==
- Herbie Langhans – vocals, vocal arrangement
- Gus G – guitars, keyboards, production, recording
- Petros Christodoulidis – bass
- Johan Nunez – drums
- Bob Katsionis – keyboards (track 5)
- Dennis Ward – engineering, production

== Charts ==
Chart (2020)	Peak position
Swiss Albums (Schweizer Hitparade)	22
