= Few Against Many =

Studio album by Firewind
- Released: 21 May 2012 (Europe); 22 May 2012 (North America)
- Recorded: Valve Studios in Thessaloniki, Greece, The Sweetspot Recording Studio Satellite in Halmstad, Sweden and Sound Symmetry Studios in Athens, Greece
- Genre: Power metal
- Length: 45:09
- Label: Century Media
- Producer: Gus G

Firewind chronology
Days of Defiance (2010)	Few Against Many (2012)	Immortals (2017)

Professional ratings
Review scores
Source	Rating
About.com	4/5 stars

Few Against Many is the seventh studio album by Greek heavy metal band Firewind. It is the first album to feature ex-Nightrage and Meridian Dawn drummer, Johan Nunez. It was released on 21 May 2012 in Europe and 22 May in North America. This would be Firewind's last album with Apollo Papathanasio as their Vocalist before he decided to quit on 15 January 2013.

== Track listing ==
No.	Title	Length
1.	"Wall of Sound"	3:58
2.	"Losing My Mind"	6:28
3.	"Few Against Many"	4:44
4.	"The Undying Fire"	5:20
5.	"Another Dimension"	3:59
6.	"Glorious"	3:37
7.	"Edge of a Dream" (feat Apocalyptica)	4:09
8.	"Destiny"	4:08
9.	"Long Gone Tomorrow"	4:44
10.	"No Heroes, No Sinners"	3:59
Total length:		45:06

Digipak edition bonus tracks
No.	Title	Length
11.	"Battleborn"	5:10
12.	"No Heroes, No Sinners (acoustic)"	2:59
Total length:		53:15

== Chart positions ==
Chart (2012)	Peak position
German Albums Chart	90
Swedish Albums Chart	12
Japanese Albums Chart	98
UK Rock Chart	11
US Top Heatseekers	28
Greek Album Chart	1

== Personnel ==
=== Band members ===
- Apollo Papathanasio – lead vocals
- Gus G. – lead guitar, backing vocals on "Wall of Sound"
- Petros Christodoulidis – bass
- Bob Katsionis – keyboards, rhythm guitar
- Johan Nunez - drums

=== Guest Artists ===
- Apocalyptica - cellos on "Edge of a Dream"
- Staffan Karlsson - backing vocals
- Johan Edlund - backing vocals
- Dean Mess - backing vocals
