= The Premonition (album) =

Studio album by Firewind
- Released: 21 March 2008
- Recorded: Studio Fredman in Göteborg, Sweden; November–December 2007
- Genre: Power metal
- Length: 45:51
- Label: Century Media
- Producer: Gus G.

Firewind chronology
Allegiance (2006)	The Premonition (2008)	Days of Defiance (2010)

Singles from The Premonition
- 1. "Mercenary Man" Released: (Online début) 2 February 2008 (Greece) 25 February 2008

Professional ratings
Review scores
Source	Rating
AllMusic	(favorable)
Blabbermouth.net	8/10 stars

The Premonition is the fifth full-length album by Firewind and their first album to feature the same line-up as its predecessor. Gus G. said "we basically kept the Allegiance 'winning team' together" much to the apparent surprise of fans.

== Creation process ==
The song writing began in part while in tour supporting the band's previous album Allegiance during which time they wrote 6 titled songs (Remembered, Life Foreclosed, The Silent Code, Mercenary Man, My Loneliness, Head Up High) Gus G. said "Song writing-wise I think all songs are special and once again everyone was involved in the writing" while in the studio they recorded a total of 12 original songs and "a few covers" including their cover of the Michael Sembello song "Maniac". Gus G. also said:

I feel that the new Firewind album is yet another step up in our career – musically speaking. Once again we aimed for a highly variable effort as I really don't like those albums where you've listened to the first song and it's like you heard them all! This doesn't happen on a Firewind album and certainly not on the new one!

— Gus G,

== Touring and promotion ==
Firewind started touring after the completion of the album in January, in which time they filmed the content for the bonus DVD. They are scheduled to tour supporting Kamelot on their "Rule the World Tour" in April through Europe and then in May on their "Tyranny and Bloodshred" tour through North America with Arch Enemy, Dark Tranquillity, and Divine Heresy.

=== Release history ===
Unlike previous releases, The Premonition wasn't first released in the band's homeland, Greece, although it was first announced for release there. Instead, it was initially released in Italy and Benelux (Belgium, the Netherlands, and Luxembourg) on 21 March 2008. Then the following day in Germany, Austria, and Switzerland. On 24 March 2008 it was released in Greece, Denmark, Norway, and to a large portion of the rest of Europe. In Spain and Portugal, it was released on 25 March 2008, and the following day in Sweden, Finland, and Hungary. It was released four days later in France, and was released in the United Kingdom on 7 April 2008. It was re-released on vinyl on 3 March 2010, making this their first vinyl release, and including the Japan bonus track "Ride to the Rainbows End".

=== Singles ===
The first single from The Premonition, "Mercenary Man", was released on the band's official Myspace page for streaming almost two months before the album's release on 2 February 2008, and one month before the album's release as a maxi-CD exclusively to Greece on 25 February 2008. In-between the two release dates, the band filmed the music video for the song in Sweden with Patric Ullaeus as the producer. "Mercenary Man" entered the Greek Top 50 Singles chart at #6 and is peaked at #5. Meanwhile, the two singles from their previous album, Allegiance, were still charting in Greece. "Falling to Pieces", which peaked at #11, it was still in at #43, and "Breaking the Silence", which peaked at #16, was still in at #33.

== Track listing ==
No.	Title	Writer(s)	Length
1.	"Into the Fire"	Gus G.; Babis Katsionis; Apollo Papathanasio	6:29
2.	"Head Up High"	Gus G.; Katsionis; Papathanasio	3:46
3.	"Mercenary Man"	Gus G.; Papathanasio	3:27
4.	"Angels Forgive Me"	Gus G.; Katsionis; Papathanasio	4:57
5.	"Remembered"	Niclas Engelin; Gus G.; Papathanasio	3:38
6.	"My Loneliness"	Gus G.; Papathanasio	4:04
7.	"Circle of Life"	Mark Cross; Gus G.; Papathanasio	4:14
8.	"The Silent Code"	Cross; Gus G.; Papathanasio	4:48
9.	"Maniac" (Michael Sembello cover)	Dennis Matkosky; Sembello	4:55
10.	"Life Foreclosed"	David T. Chastain; Gus G.	4:52

iTunes bonus track
No.	Title	Writer(s)	Length
11.	"Wild Rose"	Gus G.	4:23

Japanese bonus track
No.	Title	Writer(s)	Length
12.	"Ride to the Rainbow's End"	Gus G.	4:30

=== B-sides ===
1. "Spirits in a Digital World" (Gus G., Christo) – 4:04 (from the "Mercenary Man" single)
2. "Mercenary Man [Acoustic]" (Gus G., Papathanasio) – 3:54 (from the "Mercenary Man" single)

=== Unreleased song ===
The instrumental song "Perasmenes mou Agapes", originally by Manolis Chiotis, was cut at the final stages of the release for copyright reasons. The song had a few live performances by Firewind including at the Gagarin Open Air festival in Athens 2007. It was also played on 12 January 2008 during the filming of Live Premonition but was cut from the DVD.

== Bonus DVD ==
The special edition version of the album comes with O-Card packaging and a bonus DVD with four songs, recorded at a live performance of the album in the Principal theatre in Thessaloniki, Greece, on 12 January 2008, and interviews with all the band members.

1. "Into the Fire" – 6:34
2. "Head Up High" – 3:43
3. "Mercenary Man" – 3:56
4. "My Loneliness" – 4:01

== Personnel ==
Band members

- Apollo Papathanasio – vocals
- Gus G. – guitars
- Babis Katsionis – keyboards
- Petros Christodoylidis – bass
- Mark Cross – drums

Technical staff

- Fredrik Nordström – mixing, engineering
- Patric Ullaeus – photography
