= Matt Scurfield =

American drummer

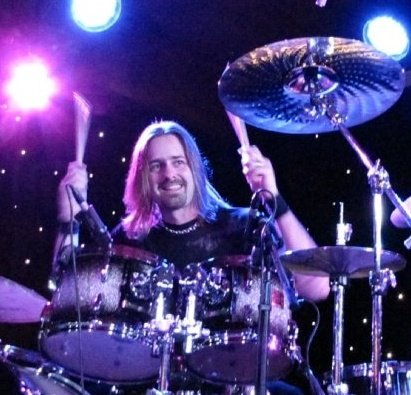

Background information
- Born: March 10, 1976 (age 50); Sarnia, Ontario, Canada
- Genre: Rock
- Occupation: Musician
- Instrument: Drums
- Years active: 1998 - present

Matthew Robert Scurfield (born March 10, 1976, in Sarnia, Ontario) is a Canadian-born American musician and songwriter from Massachusetts. He is a drummer and a notable figure in the progressive rock scene. His professional work includes studio work, touring and live performances. Matt Scurfield has recorded and/or toured with Jaye Foucher, Joe Stump, Event, Matahari, Gus G, Lita Ford, Gary Hoey, Chad Hollister Band, and Sonic Joyride

Scurfield graduated in 1998, with a degree in Professional Music, from Berklee College of Music. Scurfield's drumming style, influenced by the likes of Queensrÿche and Iron Maiden, embraces linear drumming, double bass styles, and masterfully employs basic techniques developed through three years of Drum Corps. In between touring and studio projects Matt is a private instructor at Centre Street Drums in Taunton, Massachusetts.

== Discography ==
- Nocturnal Symphony by Firewind (1998)
- Electric Skies by Event (1999)
- Behemoth by Sonic Joyride (2000)
- Contagious Grooves by Jaye Foucher (2000)
- Sacred Ground by The Reign of Terror (2001)
- 2001: A Shred Odyssey by Joe Stump (2001)
- Human Condition by Event (2001)
- Conquer and Divide by Joe Stump's Reign of Terror (2002)
- Scratching at the Surface by Event (2003)
- Shredology/Midwest Shredfest by Joe Stump (2005)
- Shrine of Counterfeits by Matahari (2005)
- American Made by Gary Hoey (2006)
- Utopia by Gary Hoey (2010)
- Living Like A Runaway by Lita Ford (2012)
- Deja Blues by Gary Hoey (2013)
- Dust & Bones by Gary Hoey (2016)
- Neon Highway Blues by Gary Hoey (2019)
- Light of Truth by Event (2021)
