= Burning Earth =

Studio album by Firewind
- Released: Original CD: 11 November 2003 Remastered Version: 6 March 2012
- Genre: Power metal
- Length: 46:48
- Label: Leviathan; Toshiba; Massacre
- Producer: David T. Chastain

Firewind chronology
Between Heaven and Hell (2002)	Burning Earth (2003)	Forged by Fire (2005)

Burning Earth is Firewind's second album, released in 2003. The original rhythm section of Brian Harris and Konstantine were replaced by Stian Kristoffersen and Petros Christo, respectively. This was the last album to feature vocalist Stephen Fredrick, who left months after its release. Burning Earth, has been remastered and re-issued in Japan via Hydrant Music in 2012.

== Track listing ==
Original recording

All tracks composed by Gus G. and Stephen Fredrick except where noted

1. "Steal Them Blind" – 4:58
2. "I Am the Anger" (Chastain, Gus G.) – 3:45
3. "Immortal Lives Young" – 6:50
4. "Burning Earth" (Chastain, Gus G.) – 4:00
5. "The Fire and the Fury" (instrumental) (Gus G.) – 5:24
6. "You Have Survived"– 5:26
7. "Brother's Keeper" – 4:40
8. "Waiting Still"– 4:04
9. "The Longest Day" (Chastain, Gus G.) – 5:20
10. "Still the Winds" – 2:13 (Japanese bonus track)

Remastered Version

1. "Steal Them Blind" - 5:00
2. "I Am The Anger" - - 3:48
3. "Immortal Lives Young" - 6:47
4. "Burning Earth" - 4:02
5. "The Fire and The Fury" - 5:26
6. "You Have Survived" - 5:28
7. "Brother's Keeper" - 4:42
8. "Waiting Still" - 4:06
9. "The Longest Day" - 5:24
10. "Burning Earth (Demo)" - 4:05
11. "The Fire and The Fury (Demo)" - 5:23
12. "You Have Survived (Demo)" - 5:27

== Personnel ==
Band members

- Stephen Fredrick – vocals
- Gus G. – guitars, keyboards
- Petros Christo – bass
- Stian L. Kristoffersen – drums
