= Allegiance (Firewind album) =

Studio album by Firewind
- Released: 10 July 2006
- Recorded: February 2006
- Studio: JM Studio, Mölnlycke, Sweden
- Genre: Power metal
- Length: 48:37
- Label: Century Media
- Producer: Gus G.

Firewind chronology
Forged By Fire (2005)	Allegiance (2006)	The Premonition (2008)

Singles from Firewind
- 1. "Falling to Pieces" Released: 13 June 2006; 2. "Breaking the Silence" Released: 2 July 2007

Professional ratings
Review scores
Source	Rating
AllMusic	3.5/5 stars
HCS.net	3.5/5 stars
Kerrang!	4/5 stars
Alternative Press	3/5 stars

Allegiance is the fourth full-length studio album by Greek power metal band Firewind, first released on 10 July 2006. Vocalist Chitral Somapala was replaced by Apollo Papathanasio and Stian L. Kristoffersen made way for Mark Cross on drums, ending the previous tradition of changing line-up between albums. It was recorded at JM Studio, Mölnlycke, Sweden, in February 2006, mixed by Fredrik Nordström with Patrik J. Sten in Studio Fredman, Göteborg, Sweden, in March 2006, then mastered by Peter In de Betou at Tailor Maid productions in Stockholm.

== Release history ==
Allegiance was initially released in Greece on 10 July 2006, almost a fortnight before the rest of the world. It was later released in Benelux (Belgium, the Netherlands, and Luxembourg), Germany, Austria, Switzerland and Italy on 21 July 2006, and three days later, on 24 July 2006, in the UK, France, Spain, Denmark, Norway and most of the rest of Europe and finally in Finland, Sweden and Hungary a further two days later, on 26 July 2006.

=== Singles and promotion ===
A month before the album's release, on 13 June 2006, the "Falling to Pieces" maxi single was released to the Greek market, with a music video directed by Patric Ullaeus, and peaked at #11 in the Greek Singles Charts. Approximately five weeks later, the album was released and peaked at the same position in the Greek Album Charts. Then, following the Inhuman Rampage tour with DragonForce and their own World Allegiance tour, they released their second single off the album, "Breaking the Silence", almost a year later, on 2 July 2007, again only physically to Greece with a video directed by Patric Ullaeus guest starring Tara Teresa, this time peaking at #16 in the Greek Singles Charts.

== Track listing ==
No.	Title	Lyrics	Music	Length
1.	"Allegiance"	Gus G., Papathanasio, Cross	Gus G.	4:41
2.	"Insanity"	Papathanasio, Gus G.	Gus G., Katsionis	4:29
3.	"Falling to Pieces"	Papathanasio	Gus G.	4:03
4.	"Ready to Strike"	Papathanasio	Gus G., Katsionis	4:35
5.	"Breaking the Silence"	Tara, Papathanasio, Cross	Gus G., Katsionis	4:03
6.	"Deliverance"	Gus G.	Gus G.	6:07
7.	"Till the End of Time"	Gus G., Papathanasio	Katsionis	4:36
8.	"Dreamchaser"	Cross	Cross	4:07
9.	"Before the Storm" (instrumental)	—	Katsionis, Gus G.	3:42
10.	"The Essence"	Gus G., Papathanasio	Gus G.	4:19
11.	"Where Do We Go from Here?"	Papathanasio	Papathanasio, Gus G.	3:57

Japanese bonus tracks
No.	Title	Writer(s)	Length
12.	"Healing Tool"	Papathanasio, Cross	4:43
13.	"Demon Nights"	Katsionis, Gus G.	4:23
Total length:			57:48

Video clip enhancements
No.	Title	Length
14.	"Falling to Pieces" (Director & Producer: Patric Ullaeus)	3:20
15.	"The Firewind Documentary 2005/2006" (Editor: Bob Katsionis)	17:26

== Personnel ==
=== Band members ===
- Apollo Papathanasio – vocals
- Gus G. – guitars
- Babis Katsionis – keyboards
- Petros Christodoylidis – bass
- Mark Cross – drums, backing vocals on "Allegiance"

=== Guest musicians ===
- Tara Teresa – vocals on "Breaking the Silence"
- Markus Palsson – backing vocals on "Allegiance" and "The Essence"

=== Technical staff ===
- Fredrik Nordström – engineering, mixing
- Patrik J. Sten – mixing assistant
- Martin Kronlund – additional engineering
- Rickard Bengtsson – vocal coach, additional engineering on "Insanity" and "Falling to Pieces"
- Peter In de Betou – mastering
- Patric Ullaeus – photography, producer and director of the video clip for "Falling to Pieces"
- Carsten Drescher – artwork
