= Fireangel =

Studio album by Mystic Prophecy
- Released: May 22, 2009
- Studio: Prophecy & Music Factory Studios, Germany
- Genre: Power metal
- Length: 46:03 (without bonus tracks)
- Label: Massacre
- Producer: R.D Liapakis

Mystic Prophecy chronology
Satanic Curses (2007)	Fireangel (2009)	Ravenlord (2011)

Professional ratings
Review scores
Source	Rating
Dangerdog Music Reviews	4/5 stars

Fireangel is the sixth studio album by German power metal band Mystic Prophecy. It is the first album to feature new guitarist Constantine, new bassist Connie Andreszka, and new drummer Stefan Dittrich who all joined the band in 2008. It was released by Massacre Records on May 22. It is the first Mystic Prophecy album to chart, reaching No. 77 on the German albums chart.

== Track listing ==
1. "Across the Gates of Hell" (Liapakis/Liapakis, Andreszka) – 4:09
2. "Demons Crown" (Liapakis/Liapakis, Pohl) – 4:30
3. "We Kill!! You Die!!" (Liapakis/Liapakis, Pohl) – 3:38
4. "Father Save Me" (Liapakis/Liapakis, Constantine) – 4:34
5. "To the Devil I Pray" (Liapakis/Liapakis, Pohl) – 4:10
6. "Fireangel" (Liapakis/Liapakis, Constantine) – 4:24
7. "Fight Back The Light" (Liapakis/Liapakis, Pohl) – 4:37
8. "Death Under Control" (Liapakis/Liapakis, Pohl) – 3:45
9. "Revolution Evil" (Liapakis/Liapakis, Pohl) – 4:06
10. "Gods of War" (Liapakis/Liapakis, Pohl) – 3:27
11. "Forever Betrayed" (Liapakis/Liapakis, Constantine) – 4:43

Bonus disk included in digipack version:

1. "Crimson Devastation" (bonus track from Satanic Curses)
2. "Stranger in Me" (bonus track from Satanic Curses)
3. "The King is Back" (bonus track from Savage Souls)
4. "War in the Sky" (bonus Track from Never-Ending)
5. "Sacrifice Me" (track from Satanic Curses)
6. "Dark Forces" (live)
7. "Sign of the Cross" (live)
8. "Evil Empires" (live)
9. "Demon's Blood" (live)
10. "Master of Sins" (live)
11. "Satanic Curces" (live)
12. "In the Darkness" (live)
13. "Shadows Beyond My Soul" (live)

== Personnel ==
- Roberto Dimitri Liapakis – vocals
- Markus Pohl – guitar
- Constantine – guitar
- Connie Andreszka – bass
- Stefan Dittrich – drums
