= Constantine (metal musician) =

Greek guitarist

Constantine, real name Konstantinos Kotzamanis (Greek: Κωνσταντίνος Κοτζαμάνης; born 1987) is a Greek metal guitarist.

With the solo project Constantine, he released the album Shredcore in 2010 and Aftermath in 2019. The first output was a shred guitar-based instrumental record. For the second album, he recruited a number of guest vocalists: Björn Strid (Soilwork), Ralf Scheepers (Primal Fear), Schmier (Destruction), Apollo Papathanasio (Firewind) and Chris Clancy (Mutiny Within).

In the second half of the 2000s he played in Nightrage, Descending. and Mystic Prophecy. He played in Nightfall during the 2010s, as well as touring with Primal Fear from 2012, covering for Magnus Karlsson who had "family obligations". He co-founded Temor in 2023.
