= Never Ending =

Never Ending may refer to:

- "Never Ending" (Elvis Presley song), 1964
- "Never Ending" (Rihanna song), 2016
- Never Ending (album), a 2018 album by Beres Hammond
- Never-Ending, a 2004 album by Mystic Prophecy
- Never Ending Tour, a name for Bob Dylan's endless touring schedule since 1988, or any individual tour in that time frame
- The Never Ending, an American indie rock and folk band
