= Forged by Fire =

Studio album by Firewind
- Released: 5 January 2005
- Recorded: Bazement studios, Germany; Mediamaker studio, Norway; A29 studio, Greece; June–August 2004
- Genre: Power metal
- Length: 49:31
- Label: Century Media
- Producer: Gus G

Firewind chronology
Burning Earth (2003)	Forged by Fire (2005)	Allegiance (2006)

Professional ratings
Review scores
Source	Rating
Allmusic	3.5/5 stars

Forged by Fire is the third full-length album by Greek power metal band Firewind and their first released through Century Media. The album was released in Japan on 5 January 2005, and on 12 July 2005 for the rest of the world. From this album onwards, Gus G is the sole ever-present in their professional discography, following the replacement of Stephen Fredrick with Chitral "Chity" Somapala. It is also the first album to feature keyboardist Bob Katsionis.

== Track listing ==
All tracks composed by Gus G. and Chitral Somapala except where noted

1. "Kill to Live" – 3:41
2. "Beware the Beast" – 4:21
3. "Tyranny" – 3:29
4. "The Forgotten Memory" – 3:42
5. "Hate World Hero" – 5:38
6. "Escape from Tomorrow" – 3:51
7. "Feast of the Savages" (Instrumental) (Gus G.) – 4:21
8. "Burn in Hell" – 4:38
9. "Perished in Flames" – 4:52
10. "The Land of Eternity" – 5:53
11. "I Confide" – 5:05 (Japanese bonus track)

Bonus videos

1. "Tyranny" (Ioannis Nikolaidis, Achilleas Kapahtsis)
2. "Making of/Burning the Earth Live" (Bob Katsionis)

== Personnel ==
Band members

- Chitral "Chity" Somapala – vocals, backing vocals
- Gus G. – guitars, producing, engineering
- Bob Katsionis – keyboards, album layout
- Petros Christo – bass guitar
- Stian L. Kristoffersen – drums

Guest musicians

- James Murphy – guitar solo on "The Forgotten Memory"
- Marty Friedman – guitar solos "Feast of the Savages"
- Lisa Gelenberg – backing vocals
- Johannes Nimtz – backing vocals
- Markus Teske – backing vocals

Technical staff

- Patrik J. Sten – mixing
  - Fredrik Nordström – assistance
- Christian Schmidt – mastering
- R.D. Liapakis – mastering
- Markus Teske – engineering
- Espen Mjoen – engineering
- Kazuo Hakamada – artwork
- OB Solutions – photography
