= Immortals (album) =

Studio album by Firewind
- Released: 21 January 2017 (Europe)
- Genre: Power metal
- Length: 49:22
- Label: Century Media
- Producer: Dennis Ward

Firewind chronology
Few Against Many (2012)	Immortals (2017)	Firewind (2020)

Immortals is the eighth studio album by Greek heavy metal band Firewind. It is the first album to feature new vocalist Henning Basse and the final album by the band to have longtime keyboardist Bob Katsionis before he departed in 2020. It was released on 20 January 2017 in Europe.

== Track listing ==
All lyrics by Dennis Ward. All music by Gus G., except where noted.

No.	Title	Length
1.	"Hands of Time"	4:49
2.	"We Defy"	3:52
3.	"Ode to Leonidas"	5:59
4.	"Back on the Throne"	4:03
5.	"Live and Die by the Sword"	6:12
6.	"Wars of Ages" (G., Bob Katsionis)	4:05
7.	"Lady of 1000 Sorrows"	4:42
8.	"Immortals" (Instrumental)	1:57
9.	"Warriors and Saints"	4:08
10.	"Rise from the Ashes"	4:30
11.	"Vision of Tomorrow" (Digipack Bonus Track)	5:05
Total length:		49:22

== Personnel ==
- Henning Basse – lead vocals
- Gus G. – lead guitar
- Petros Christodoulidis – bass
- Bob Katsionis – keyboards, rhythm guitar
- Johan Nunez – drums

== Charts ==
Chart (2017)	Peak position
Belgian Albums (Ultratop Flanders)	184
Belgian Albums (Ultratop Wallonia)	98
German Albums (Offizielle Top 100)	72
Swiss Albums (Schweizer Hitparade)	45
Greek Albums (IFPI)	6
