= A Star-Crossed Wasteland =

Studio album by In This Moment
- Released: July 9, 2010
- Recorded: January–April 2010
- Studios: The Hideout, Las Vegas
- Genres: Metalcore; heavy metal; hard rock
- Length: 42:08
- Label: Century Media
- Producer: Kevin Churko

In This Moment chronology
The Dream (2008)	A Star-Crossed Wasteland (2010)	Blood (2012)

Singles from A Star-Crossed Wasteland
- 1. "The Gun Show" Released: June 1, 2010; 2. "The Promise" Released: September 28, 2010

A Star-Crossed Wasteland is the third studio album by American rock band In This Moment. The album was first released in Germany on July 9, 2010, and later in the United States by Century Media. It was named by Alternative Press as one of the most anticipated releases of 2010. This is the first album not to feature bassist Jesse Landry; it is also the band's only album to feature bassist Kyle Konkiel, and the last album with founding members rhythm guitarist Blake Bunzel and drummer Jeff Fabb.

== Background ==
Before the band started their first headlining tour in late 2009, vocalist Maria Brink announced that they had begun writing songs for their upcoming third album to be released the following summer. In January, the band described the sounds of A Star-Crossed Wasteland in a Myspace posting, talking about their plans for 2010:

As far as direction for the new album everyone in the band is feeling a heavier/ darker vibe, We want the lush production and melodic layers from "The Dream" with the raw power and aggression from "Beautiful Tragedy" all mixed together...we are the kind of band that musically does what we want, from the heart, we do not follow trends or fads, the new ITM album will be no exception, we are writing from our heart and I can promise you what you hear from us next will be 100% THE REAL DEAL, no flavor of the week bullshit here.

Brink says working with Churko was the obvious choice: "We worked with Kevin Churko on the last album, and that's who we want. He's our dude. He can take the second album that we just had, still go heavy, but not sound just like our first album and grow into something new and evolved. We want to move up without sounding like we've gone backwards."

Production and recording began in February 2010 at the Wolve's Den in Las Vegas. This is also the first studio album to feature new bass player, Kyle Konkiel. The album was completed in April and Brink announced the release date during an interview at the Revolver Golden God Awards.

== Composition ==
=== Influences, style and themes ===
In January 2009, Brink revealed two working song titles, "The Gun Show" and "The World Is On Fire" on her website. Lyrically, Brink drew inspiration from her personal life, mostly the ending of her relationship with DevilDriver bassist Jon Miller. She describes her experiences on the album title and its meaning, "I wrote about my experiences and kinda this metaphorical story type thing. There is definitely an underlying theme for this whole entire album of this post-apocalyptic wasteland world and 'star-crossed lovers' is obviously where these two people are meant to basically fail and it's not gonna work out, so it's this Star-Crossed Wasteland world."

The sound of A Star-Crossed Wasteland takes elements from both Beautiful Tragedy and The Dream, but with a darker and heavier sound. Chris Howorth describes: "We went in a much heavier direction on this album. We feel it's our defining album. Just the right mix of aggression and melody." Howorth also does the backing vocals for many of the songs such as "Iron Army", "The Road", and "The Last Cowboy". "The Promise" is a duet featuring vocals by Adrian Patrick, lead singer of Otherwise. Originally, the male vocal parts were intended for Ivan Moody of Five Finger Death Punch.

== Release and promotion ==
A teaser trailer was released on May 19 containing a small snippet of a new song, "The Gun Show". A few weeks later, a new trailer was released featuring an extended clip of the song, a first look at the music video and also a glimpse of the album cover artwork.

On June 1, "The Gun Show" premiered on Sirius XM Radio Liquid Metal channel along with an interview with Brink. Three other songs were also premiered that night including "Iron Army", "Standing Alone", and "Blazin". On June 14, clips of the album can be previewed on iTunes, a full month before the release date. Another track, "Just Drive" was made available for online streaming on July 3. The entire album was available for streaming on July 9.

=== Singles ===
- "The Gun Show" is the first single and was released on iTunes on June 1. The song was also available for streaming on their Myspace and Facebook page on June 8.
- "The Promise" was released as the album's second single and is the first track for active rock and alternative radio stations in the US. A video for the song was filmed around the same time as "The Gun Show".

=== Tours and performances ===
The band supported the album by touring from July to August 2010, and they participated in the Mayhem Festival 2010.

== Critical reception ==
Professional ratings
Review scores
Source	Rating
411mania.con	7/10 stars
About.com	3.5/5 stars
AllMusic	4.5/5 stars
Alternative Press	4.5/5 stars
Boston Herald	B+
Metalholic	(9.4/10)
PopMatters	7/10 stars
Rock Sound	7/10 stars
Sputnikmusic	3/5 stars

The album received positive reviews upon its release. The NewReview gave the album a 4 out of 5 and stated "The band have put out a monumental work that is utterly and completely enjoyable that sets the standard— and boy is it high." The Boston Herald gave it a B+, calling Maria Brink's vocals "a roaring, emotional hellion and much more than just a pretty face." MSN Music called the record "powerful" and labeled it some of the "heaviest stuff they've ever recorded." The album received 4.5 stars from Alternative Press, which felt that the band have created a "modern metal masterpiece". Chad Bower of About.com rated the album 3.5 of 5 stars, and said of Brinks vocals, "The transitions between singing and screaming seem smoother this time around."

Lenny Vowels of the 411mania.com gave A Star-Crossed Wasteland 7 out of 10 stars—"good" according to the 411 Legend—and summarized his review by saying: "As a whole, with this album, it seemed like In This Moment finally took the necessary steps towards becoming a bigger band in America. The album sounds quite a bit more mainstream than their previous two releases. It's not so much bad as it is hit-and-miss. Thankfully, it's mostly a hit. While I certainly can't say I'm a fan of everything on this album, the positive sides bring the goods. Maybe this will be the album that finally gets In This Moment the amount of exposure they need in the U.S." Phil Freeman of AllMusic compared the album's sound to the works of Italian gothic metal band Lacuna Coil and commented: "Established fans of In This Moment will love A Star-Crossed Wasteland, but as their best album, it's also a perfect introduction for a newcomer."

== Commercial performance ==
A Star-Crossed Wasteland debuted at #40 on the Billboard 200, selling approximately 10,500 copies in its first week of release. It also debuted at number one on the Billboard Independent Albums chart and number eight on the Top Hard Rock Albums chart. This was the highest chart position to date by the band, beating its 2008 predecessor which debuted at number 70 on the Billboard 200 with first-week sales of 8,000 copies.

== Track listing ==
All lyrics are written by Maria Brink; all music is composed by In This Moment and Kevin Churko.

Standard edition
No.	Title	Length
1.	"The Gun Show"	4:47
2.	"Just Drive"	3:27
3.	"The Promise" (featuring Adrian Patrick of Otherwise)	4:28
4.	"Standing Alone"	3:51
5.	"A Star-Crossed Wasteland"	4:31
6.	"Blazin'"	4:21
7.	"The Road" (featuring Gus G)	4:04
8.	"Iron Army"	3:27
9.	"The Last Cowboy"	3:54
10.	"World in Flames"	5:21
Total length:		42:08

Deluxe edition
No.	Title	Length
11.	"Remember"	4:23
12.	"A Star-Crossed Wasteland" (unplugged)	4:50
Total length:		51:24

Japanese edition
No.	Title	Length
11.	"The Promise" (radio edit)
12.	"A Star-Crossed Wasteland" (unplugged)
13.	"The Promise" (instrumental)
14.	"The Gun Show" (instrumental)

Deluxe DVD contents
No.	Title	Length
1.	"Maria & Chris answer fan-submitted questions"	27:19
2.	"World in Flames" (live unplugged performance)	5:02
3.	"In the Studio/Making of A Star-Crossed Wasteland"	8:24
4.	"Getting ready and shopping with Maria on Melrose"	4:30
5.	"Making of "The Gun Show" video"	5:36

== Personnel ==
In This Moment

- Maria Brink – lead vocals
- Chris Howorth – lead guitar, backing vocals
- Blake Bunzel – rhythm guitar
- Kyle Konkiel – bass
- Jeff Fabb – drums

Additional musicians

- Gus G – guitar on "The Road"
- Adrian Patrick – additional vocals on "The Promise"

Additional personnel

- Kevin Churko – production, engineering, mixing, Pro Tools
- Kane Churko – pro-tools, engineering
- Anthony Clarkson – artwork, layout
- Mike Gitter – A&R
- Steve Joh – A&R
- Andy Hartmark – photography
- Kemnay Churko – photography
- Tara Tatangeio – make-up, hair stylist
- Sheri Bodel – clothing design
- Rob "Blasko" Nicholson – management

== Charts ==
Chart performance for A Star-Crossed Wasteland
Chart (2010)	Peak position
US Billboard 200	40
US Independent Albums (Billboard)	1
US Top Alternative Albums (Billboard)	8
US Top Hard Rock Albums (Billboard)	4
US Top Rock Albums (Billboard)	13

== Release history ==
Date	Region
July 9, 2010	Europe
July 12, 2010	United Kingdom
July 13, 2010	United States
August 25, 2010	Japan
November 25, 2016	United States (Record Store Day – Vinyl)
