= Days of Defiance =

Studio album by Firewind
- Released: 25 October 2010 (Europe); 26 October 2010 (North America)
- Recorded: Sound Symmetry Studios, Greece
- Genre: Power metal
- Length: 54:45
- Label: Century Media

Firewind chronology
The Premonition (2008)	Days of Defiance (2010)	Few Against Many (2012)

Singles from Days of Defiance
- 1. "World on Fire" Released: 17 August 2010; 2. "The Ark of Lies" Released: 2010

Professional ratings
Review scores
Source	Rating
Allmusic	4/5 stars
Blabbermouth.net	7/10 stars

Days of Defiance is the sixth studio album by Greek heavy metal band Firewind. It was released on 25 October 2010 in Europe and 26 October in North America.

The guitars, bass, keyboards and drums were recorded at Sound Symmetry Studios and Zero Gravity Studios in Greece while the vocals were recorded at Studio Landgren 5,0 in Sweden. All backing vocals were recorded by Marcus Pålsson. The artwork was done by Gustavo Sazes.

== Track listing ==
No.	Title	Length
1.	"The Ark of Lies"	4:45
2.	"World on Fire"	4:39
3.	"Chariot"	4:39
4.	"Embrace the Sun"	4:06
5.	"The Departure"	0:45
6.	"Heading for the Dawn"	4:01
7.	"Broken"	3:26
8.	"Cold as Ice"	4:35
9.	"Kill in the Name of Love"	4:27
10.	"SKG"	5:20
11.	"Losing Faith"	4:12
12.	"The Yearning"	4:54
13.	"When All Is Said and Done"	5:06

Limited Edition bonus tracks
No.	Title	Length
14.	"Wild Rose"	4:25
15.	"Ride to the Rainbow's End"	4:32
16.	"Breaking the Law (Judas Priest Cover)"	2:38

iTunes bonus track
No.	Title	Length
14.	"Riding on the Wind"	4:16

== Singles ==
Two singles were released from Days of Defiance: "World on Fire" and "Embrace The Sun".

== Personnel ==
- Apollo Papathanasio – vocals
- Gus G. – lead guitars
- Bob Katsionis – rhythm guitars and keyboards
- Petros Christo – bass
- Mark Cross - drums (credited for recording all drums on the album, no longer a member and not featured in album promotional material and artwork)
- Michael Ehré – drums (recorded none of the material with the exception of "Breaking the Law")
