= Killhammer =

Studio album by Mystic Prophecy
- Released: 27 September 2013
- Studios: Prophecy & Music Factory studios, Germany
- Genre: Power metal
- Length: 48:05
- Label: Massacre Records
- Producers: R.D Liapakis, Christian Schmid

Mystic Prophecy chronology
Ravenlord (2011)	Killhammer (2013)	War Brigade (2016)

Professional ratings
Review scores
Source	Rating
Darkscene.at	8.5/10
Heavymetal.dk	9/10
Metal Temple	8/10
Metal.de	8/10
Metalfan.nl	57/100
Musikreviews.de	10/15
Powermetal.de	7/10

Killhammer is the eighth studio album by German power metal band Mystic Prophecy, released on 27 September 2013.

== Track listing ==
All lyrics by R.D. Liapakis (except track 11), songwriters listed in parentheses.

1. "Killhammer" (Liapakis / Andreszka) - 4:16
2. "Armies of Hell" (Liapakis / Ragazas) - 4:30
3. "To Hell and Back" (Liapakis / Ragazas) - 4:24
4. "Kill the Beast" (Liapakis / Andreszka) - 3:24
5. "Hate Black" (Liapakis / Ragazas) - 4:54
6. "Children of the Damned" (Liapakis / Andreszka / Ragazas) - 4:41
7. "300 in Blood" (Liapakis / Pohl) - 4:22
8. "Angels of Fire" (Liapakis / Ragazas) - 4:07
9. "Warriors of the Northern Seas" (Liapakis / Pohl) - 4:21
10. "Set the World on Fire" (Liapakis / Ragazas) - 3:47
11. "Crazy Train" (Ozzy Osbourne cover) - 5:19

== Personnel ==
- Roberto Dimitri Liapakis – vocals
- Lakis Ragazas – guitars
- Markus Pohl – guitars
- Connie Andreszka – bass
- Tristan Maiwurm – drums
