= Satanic Curses =

Studio album by Mystic Prophecy
- Released: 2007
- Recorded: Prophecy & Music Factory studios, Germany
- Genre: Power metal
- Label: Massacre Records
- Producer: R.D Liapakis & Fredrik Nordström

Mystic Prophecy chronology
Savage Souls (2006)	Satanic Curses (2007)	Fireangel (2009)

Satanic Curses is the fifth studio album by the German power metal band Mystic Prophecy. It was released in 2007.

== Track listing ==
- All music by Liapakis and Pohl
- All lyrics by Liapakis
- Track 11 written by Iommi, Ward, Butler, Osbourne
1. "Back from the Dark" - 3:47
2. "Sacrifice Me" - 3:59
3. "Dark Forces" - 3:44
4. "Satanic Curses" - 3:40
5. "Evil of Destruction" - 4:27
6. "Demons Blood" - 4:45
7. "Damnation" - 4:02
8. "Rock the Night" - 4:13
9. "We Will Survive" - 4:38
10. "Grave of Thousand Lies" - 3:47
11. "Paranoid" (Black Sabbath cover) - 2:45
12. "We Fly" (bonus track) - 4:21

== Personnel ==
- Roberto Dimitri Liapakis – vocals
- Martin Grimm – guitars
- Markus Pohl – guitars
- Martin Albrecht – bass
- Mattias Straub – drums

== Reviews ==
Larry Griffin writing for metalcrypt.com called the album a "solid exercise in revisiting the strengths of past greats". Writing for metalfan.nl Jeroen stated it matched the level of Mystic Prophecy's previous album, Savage Souls.
