= Imaginary Force =

Studio album by Bob Katsionis
- Released: June 6, 2004
- Genre: Neo-Classical, Progressive
- Length: 50:06
- Label: Lion Music
- Producer: Bob Katsionis

Bob Katsionis chronology
Turn Of My Century (2002)	Imaginary Force (2004)	Noemon (2008)

Imaginary Force is the second solo album by Greek keyboardist and guitarist Bob Katsionis. It was released June 6, 2004, under the label Lion Music.

== Track listing ==
1. "The Imaginary Force" – 4:11
2. "March Of The Spirits" – 3:58
3. "Sing For The Day" – 4:39
4. "Galaxy" – 3:06
5. "Sudden Death" – 3:13
6. "Bird's Eye View – 3:31
7. "Is It Me Or The Weather?" – 4:18
8. "All My Naked Hopes" – 4:08
9. "Separated" – 4:46
10. "St. Pervert" – 3:58
11. "Tsifteteli (Overture 1821)" 5:56
12. "Ouzo!" – 6:23

== Personnel ==
=== Band members ===
- Bob Katsionis – Guitars and keyboards
- Stavros Giannakopoulos – Bass
- Fotis Giannakopoulos – Drums

=== Guest musicians ===
- Theodore Ziras – Guitar solo on "Ouzo!"
- Alex Flouros – Guitar solo on "Ouzo!"
