= Ravenlord =

Studio album by Mystic Prophecy
- Released: 25 November 2011
- Studios: Prophecy & Music Factory studios, Germany
- Genre: Power metal
- Length: 40:15
- Label: Massacre Records
- Producers: R.D Liapakis, Christian Schmid

Mystic Prophecy chronology
Fireangel (2009)	Ravenlord (2011)	Killhammer (2013)

Professional ratings
Review scores
Source	Rating
Darkscene.at	9/10
Metal Temple	7/10
Metal.de	9/10
Metal1.info	8/10
Musikreviews.de	10/15
Powermetal.de	9/10

Ravenlord is the seventh studio album by German power metal band Mystic Prophecy, released on 25 November 2011.

== Track listing ==
All lyrics by R.D. Liapakis (except track 10), songwriters listed in parentheses.

1. "Ravenlord" (Liapakis / Pohl) - 4:06
2. "Die Now" (Liapakis / Andreszka) - 3:30
3. "Eyes of the Devil" (Liapakis / Andreszka) - 5:24
4. "Damned Tonight" (Liapakis / Andreszka) - 3:24
5. "Hollow" (Liapakis / Pohl) - 4:32
6. "Wings of Destiny" (Liapakis / Andreszka) - 4:22
7. "Endless Fire" (Liapakis / Pohl) - 4:30
8. "Cross of Lies" (Liapakis / Pohl) - 3:21
9. "Reckoning Day" (Liapakis / Pohl) - 3:47
10. "Miracle Man" (Ozzy Osbourne cover) - 3:19

== Personnel ==
- Roberto Dimitri Liapakis – vocals
- Constantine – guitars
- Markus Pohl – guitars
- Connie Andreszka – bass
- Tyronne Silva – drums
