= Between Heaven and Hell (album) =

Debut record by Firewind, from 2002

Studio album by Firewind
- Released: 30 July 2002
- Genre: Power metal
- Length: 52:48
- Label: Leviathan; Massacre; Century Media (Re-release)
- Producer: David Chastain

Firewind chronology
Nocturnal Symphony (1998)	Between Heaven and Hell (2002)	Burning Earth (2003)

Alternate Cover
- Japanese Version of the cover released under EMI

Between Heaven and Hell is Firewind's first album released in 2002 through Massacre Records in Europe, Leviathan Records in the US, EMI in Japan and Rock Brigade in South America. There were 3 different versions of the cover art, European, Japanese and American. The album was re-released on 10 October 2007 with the European artwork originally designed by Kristian Wåhlin and with 2 bonus demo tracks.

== Track listing ==
All music composed by Gus G. and all lyrics by Stephen Fredrick except the Scorpions cover "Pictured Life"

1. "Between Heaven and Hell" – 4:51
2. "Warrior" – 4:44
3. "World of Conflict" – 4:04
4. "Destination Forever" – 3:44
5. "Oceans" (Instrumental) – 1:49
6. "Tomorrow Can Wait" – 5:39
7. "Pictured Life" (Meine, Schenker, Roth) – 3:36
8. "Firewind Raging" – 4:26
9. "I Will Fight Alone" – 5:09
10. "Northern Sky" (Instrumental) – 4:50
11. "Fire" – 4:38
12. "Who Am I?" – 5:18 (Contains a sample of one of J.S. Bach's violin concertos)
13. "End of an Era" – 1:52 (Japanese bonus track — dedicated to Chuck Schuldiner)
14. "Fire" (Demo) – 4:30 (re-release bonus track)
15. "Destination Forever" (Demo) – 3:28 (re-release bonus track)

== Personnel ==
Band members

- Stephen Fredrick – vocals
- Gus G. – guitars, keyboards
- Konstantine – bass
- Brian Harris – drums
