= The Promise (In This Moment song) =

Single by In This Moment featuring Adrian Patrick

from the album A Star-Crossed Wasteland
- Released: September 28, 2010
- Genre: Alternative metal; melodic metalcore
- Length: 4:28
- Label: Century Media
- Songwriter(s): In This Moment
- Producer(s): Kevin Churko

In This Moment singles chronology
"The Gun Show" (2010)	"The Promise" (2010)	"Blood" (2012)

Music video
- "The Promise" on YouTube

"The Promise" is a song by American rock band In This Moment. It is the second promotional single released from their third studio album, A Star-Crossed Wasteland, and first to go for radio adds. The song is a duet with Otherwise vocalist Adrian Patrick. The music video for the song premiered in late September 2010.

== Song meaning ==
"This song is about when you are madly in love with somebody, but you know that you’re dangerous for that person and vice versa. They’re dangerous for you even though you crave them. You want it more than anything, even though you know it will end badly." – Maria Brink

== Background ==
Originally, Brink had written the male vocal parts of the song for Five Finger Death Punch frontman Ivan Moody. Due to record business issues, Moody was not able to lend his vocals to the track. Brink explains, "They (Five Finger Death Punch) would've had a single coming out at the same time as us, so it prevents problems business wise or whatever. [There] was nothing we could do for it..." Producer Kevin Churko instead enlisted Adrian Patrick, who sang on the demo version of the song to appear on the final version. Guitarist Chris Howorth says Patrick's vocals were a perfect match, "Adrian had this deep, rich voice. And together with Maria, it was a sound I have never heard before from any band or any duet. It was such a thrill to write such a powerful song and hear it sound so amazing in its rough form."

== Promotion ==
The music video was directed by David Brodsky and shot around the same time as the first single, "The Gun Show" in May 2010. The clip premiered on Century Media's YouTube channel on September 22, 2010.

To perform the song live, Adrian Patrick has made appearances throughout the summers 2010 Mayhem festival to sing the duet while his band Otherwise opened for In This Moment on a few off festival shows. Patrick continued to sing the duet during the bands co headlining tour with Nonpoint during the fall of 2010. Maria Brink has invited other vocalists from touring bands to fill in Patricks vocals live.

For Record Store Day 2011, a limited edition CD single of "The Promise" was released. Only 1,000 were produced and the single features two tracks recorded live at Criminal Records on December 11, 2010.

== Reception ==
"The Promise" is In This Moment's highest-charting single to date. The song cracked the Top 40 Active Rock Chart in late January.

== Track listing ==
Promo CD

1. "The Promise (Radio Version)" - 4:28
2. "The Promise (Album Version)" - 4:28

CD single

1. "The Promise (Album Version)" - 4:28
2. "The Promise (Acoustic/Live at Criminal Records)"
3. "Standing Alone (Live at Criminal Records)"

== Personnel ==
In This Moment

- Maria Brink, - vocals
- Chris Howorth - lead guitar
- Kyle Konkiel - bass
- Blake Bunzel - rhythm guitar
- Jeff Fabb - drums

Additional musicians

- Adrian Patrick - guest vocals
