= The Gun Show =

Single by In This Moment

from the album A Star-Crossed Wasteland
- Released: June 1, 2010
- Genre: Metalcore
- Length: 4:46
- Label: Century Media
- Songwriter(s): In This Moment
- Producer(s): Kevin Churko

In This Moment singles chronology
"Call Me" (2009)	"The Gun Show" (2010)	"The Promise" (2010)

Music video
- "The Gun Show" on YouTube

"The Gun Show" is a song by American rock band In This Moment. It is the first promotional single released from their third studio album, A Star-Crossed Wasteland. The song was released to iTunes on June 1, premiered on Sirius XM Radio Liquid Metal channel, and was also available for streaming on their Myspace page for 24 hours.

A teaser trailer was released on May 19 containing a small snippet of the song. A few weeks later, a new trailer was released featuring an extended clip of the song and a first look at the music video.

It was the official theme song of TNA Against All Odds 2011, and was later re-used by the promotion for their show Xplosion.

== Style ==
"The Gun Show" represents the band's return to a heavier sound. Guitarist Chris Howorth says, "we just wanted to come out with a really heavy metal track to show everybody that In This Moment is back in metal and we’re embracing that part of ourselves." It contains screaming by lead vocalist Maria Brink throughout the song with no clean vocals, a first for the band.

== Track listing ==
1. "The Gun Show" — 4:46

== Music video ==
On May 1, 2010, the band posted a flyer on their Twitter and Myspace asking their Los Angeles area fans to come out in full cowboy costume for the music video. The video was directed by David Brodsky and debuted on Revolver TV June 23.

Brink describes the song and video shoot: "It's kind of a western ranch feel video for sure. I dressed up as a cowgirl and have these cowgirls in the video with me. We had so much fun doing it. It's just, I think it's one of the heaviest songs and we really love it, and its just a fun, awesome, summertime kick ass song."

== Personnel ==
In This Moment

- Maria Brink – lead vocals
- Chris Howorth – lead guitar, backing vocals
- Blake Bunzel – rhythm guitar
- Kyle Konkiel – bass
- Jeff Fabb – drums
