= War Brigade =

Studio album by Mystic Prophecy
- Released: 18 March 2016
- Studios: Prophecy & Music Factory studios, Germany
- Genre: Power metal
- Length: 44:32
- Label: Massacre Records
- Producer: R.D Liapakis

Mystic Prophecy chronology
Killhammer (2013)	War Brigade (2016)	Monuments Uncovered (2018)

Professional ratings
Review scores
Source	Rating
Darkscene.at	8/10
Heavymetal.dk	8/10
Metal Temple	10/10
Metal.de	9/10
Powermetal.de	7.5/10

War Brigade is the ninth studio album by German power metal band Mystic Prophecy, released on 18 March 2016. It was mixed by Swedish producer Fredrik Nordström. The band promoted the album with a European tour in September and October 2016, supported by Artillery.

== Track listing ==
All lyrics by R.D. Liapakis, songwriters listed in parentheses.

1. "Follow the Blind" (Liapakis / Ragazas) - 3:55
2. "Metal Brigade" (Liapakis / Ragazas) - 4:30
3. "Burning Out" (Liapakis / Ragazas) - 3:54
4. "The Crucifix" (Liapakis / Ragazas) - 4:09
5. "Pray for Hell" (Liapakis / Ragazas) - 4:19
6. "10,000 Miles Away" (Liapakis / Pohl) - 3:41
7. "Good Day to Die" (Liapakis / Pohl) - 4:07
8. "The Devil Is Back" (Liapakis / Pohl) - 3:52
9. "War Panzer" (Liapakis / Pohl) - 4:08
10. "Fight for One Nation" (Liapakis / Pohl) - 4:04
11. "War of Lies" (Liapakis / Pohl) - 3:53

== Personnel ==
- Roberto Dimitri Liapakis – vocals
- Lakis Ragazas – guitars
- Markus Pohl – guitars
- Joey Roxx – bass
- Tristan Maiwurm – drums
