= Noemon =

Studio album by Bob Katsionis
- Released: October 14, 2008
- Genre: Neo-Classical, Progressive
- Length: 46:14
- Label: Lion Music
- Producer: Bob Katsionis

Bob Katsionis chronology
Imaginary Force (2006)	Noemon (2008)	Rest In Keys (2012)

Noemon is the third solo album by the Greek keyboardist and guitarist Bob Katsionis. It was released on October 14, 2008 under the label Lion Music.

== Track listing ==
1. "Noemon" – 4:03
2. "Birth of the Sun" – 3:57
3. "Tears of Alice" – 3:31
4. "Soukse!" – 3:52
5. "Delirium In Santiago" – 3:34
6. "A Melody Like You" – 3:38
7. "The Nightrager" – 3:34
8. "Athenian Light" – 4:32
9. "Milestone" – 3:30
10. "The Wounded Chords" – 4:07
11. "Apocalypse" – 3:05
12. "Spongeibob Vs Ibob the Builder" – 5:02

== Personnel ==
=== Band members ===
- Bob Katsionis - Keyboards and guitar
- Stelios Pavlou - drums
- George Xyndas - bass guitar

=== Guest musicians ===
- Jeff Waters – Guitar solo on "Tears of Alice"
- Marcel Coenen – Guitar solos on "Soukse!" and "Athenian Light"
- Theodore Ziras – Guitar solo on "Apocalypse"
- Lars Eric Mattsson – Guitar solo on "Delirium In Santiago"
