= Turn of My Century =

Turn Of My Century

Studio album by Bob Katsionis
- Released: 2002
- Recorded: 2001
- Studio: Sound Symmetry Studios
- Genre: Neo-Classical, Progressive
- Length: 58:08
- Label: Lion Music
- Producer: Bob Katsionis

Bob Katsionis chronology
Turn Of My Century (2002)	Imaginary Force (2004)

Turn Of My Century is the first solo album by Greek guitarist and keyboardist Bob Katsionis. It was released in 2002 under the label Lion Music. It was rereleased in Japan in 2004 with new cover art and a bonus video.

Cover art of the 2004 Japanese rerelease

== Track listing ==
1. "Turn Of My Century" – 3:02
2. "Planetarium" – 4:32
3. "Cosmic" – 3:50
4. "Omega" – 3:41
5. "Windows To The World" – 4:11
6. "My Strange Girl" – 4:30
7. "Forbidden Erotica" – 2:07
8. "Song Of The East" – 3:23
9. "Exploration" – 3:48
10. "Enhanced Fear" – 4:04
11. "Automatic World Science" – 3:28
12. "Face The Undead" – 2:47
13. "Sapphire" – 1:52
14. "Enemy's Adagio" – 2:49
15. "Flight Of the Pink Dragon" – 3:20
16. "Cold Pale Skin" – 3:37
17. "Scary Groove" – 2:58

== Personnel ==
- Bob Katsionis - keyboards, 7 string guitar
- Fotis Benardo - drums
- Steve Benardo - bass
