= Monuments Uncovered =

Studio album of cover songs by Mystic Prophecy
- Released: 10 January 2018
- Studios: Prophecy and Music Factory Studios (Germany)
- Genre: Power metal
- Length: 37:05
- Label: Massacre
- Producers: R.D Liapakis; Fredrik Nordström

Mystic Prophecy chronology
| War Brigade (2016) | Monuments Uncovered (2018) | Metal Division (2020) |

Monuments Uncovered is the tenth studio album by the German power metal band Mystic Prophecy. It was released by Massacre Records on the 12 January 2018 and contains 11 metal cover tracks of famous rock hits primarily from the 1970s and 1980s with the exception of "Are You Gonna Go My Way" and "Space Lord" releasing from the 1990s.

== Track listing ==
1. You Keep Me Hangin' On (Kim Wilde/The Supremes cover) - 4:02
2. Hot Stuff (Donna Summer cover) - 3:47
3. Shadow on the Wall (Mike Oldfield cover) - 3:14
4. Are You Gonna Go My Way (Lenny Kravitz cover) - 3:12
5. I'm Still Standing (Elton John cover) - 3:12
6. Because the Night (Patti Smith cover) - 3:28
7. Space Lord (Monster Magnet cover) - 4:38
8. Get It On (T.Rex cover) - 4:33
9. Tokyo (At Vance cover) - 3:41
10. Proud Mary (Creedence Clearwater Revival cover) - 3:18
11. The Stroke (Billy Squier cover) (digipak bonus track) - 3:40

== Personnel ==
- Roberto Dimitri Liapakis – vocals
- Markus Pohl – guitars
- Joey Roxx – bass
- Hanno Kerstan – drums
- Evan K – guitars
- Producer - R.D. Liapakis
- Mixer - Fredrik Nordström
- Mastering - Christian Schmid and R.D.Liapakis
- Recorded at Prophecy & Music Factory Studios (Germany)
- Sound Engineer - Christian Schmid
- Cover art and general artwork - Uwe Jarling
- Artwork and layout design - Anestis Goudas
- Band photos - Peter Roth
