= Vengeance (Mystic Prophecy album) =

Studio album by Mystic Prophecy
- Released: August 2001
- Recorded: Prophecy & Music Factory Studios, Germany
- Genre: Power metal
- Length: 51:30
- Label: B-Mind Records
- Producer: R.D Liapakis & Christian Schmid

Mystic Prophecy chronology
Vengeance (2001)	Regressus (2003)

Vengeance is the first studio album by German power metal band Mystic Prophecy. It was originally released on 24 August 2001 by B-Mind Records and reissued in 2003 by Nuclear Blast.

The album was rated 2.5 out of 5 stars by AllMusic.

== Track listing ==
1. "1545 – The Beginning" – 1:02
2. "Sky's Burning" – 6:45
3. "Damnation and Darkness" – 4:30
4. "Welcome (In the Damned Circle)" – 5:29
5. "Dark Side of the Moon" – 5:13
6. "River of Hate" – 4:45
7. "In the Mirror" – 5:09
8. "In the Distance" – 5:02
9. "When Shadows Fall" – 4:49
10. "Fallen Angel" – 8:34

== Personnel ==
- Roberto Dimitri Liapakis – vocals
- Gus G. – guitars
- Martin Albrecht – bass
- Dennis Ekdahl – drums
