= Descending (band) =

Greek metal band

Descending was a Greek death/thrash metal band. They released two albums, both through Massacre Records.

Vocalist Jon Simvonis also played in Godlike Demon. Guitarist Constantine played in Nightrage prior to Descending.

== Select discography ==
- Enter Annihilation (2008)
- New Death Celebrity (2011)

== External link ==
- Discogs

=== Further reading ===
- Review of Enter Annihilation by Stormbringer.at (in German)
- Review of Enter Annihilation by Metal Temple
- Review of Enter Annihilation by Disagreement
- Review of Enter Annihilation by Metal Rage
- Review of Enter Annihilation by Brutalism
- Review of Enter Annihilation by Metalfan.nl (in Dutch)
- Review of Enter Annihilation by Rocking.gr (in Greek)
- Review of Enter Annihilation by Darkscene.at (in German)

- Review of New Death Celebrity by Stormbringer.at (in German)
- Review of New Death Celebrity by Time for Metal (in German)
- Review of New Death Celebrity by Metal 1 (in German)
- Review of New Death Celebrity by Metal Kaoz
- Review of New Death Celebrity by Hallowed.se
- Review of New Death Celebrity by Reflections of Darkness
