= Live Premonition =

Video by Firewind
- Released: 28 November 2008
- Genre: Heavy metal, power metal
- Label: Century Media

Live Premonition is the first live DVD by Greek heavy metal band Firewind.

It had 22 songs and is released on 2 CDs or 1 DVD. There is also a combo pack available. Songs 3-10 are from the Firewind album The Premonition. All the other tracks with exception of the solos are from prior Firewind albums. The show was filmed on 12 January 2008 and subsequently released on 28 November 2008.

== Track listing ==
1. Allegiance
2. Insanity
3. Into the Fire
4. Head up High
5. Mercenary Man
6. Angels Forgive Me
7. My Loneliness
8. Circle of Life
9. The Silent Code
10. Life Foreclosed
11. Destination Forever
12. Keyboard solo
13. Guitar solo
14. The Fire and the Fury
15. Drum solo/Dreamchaser
16. Till the End of Time
17. Deliverance
18. Brother's Keeper
19. Between Heaven and Hell
20. I am the Anger
21. Falling to Pieces
22. Tyranny

=== Extras ===
- Documentary / Tales of the Greek Road Warriors
- Unplugged - MAD TV Sessions
  - My Loneliness
  - Where Do We Go from Here?
- Live in Montreal 2008
  - Head up High
  - The Fire and the Fury
  - Till the End of Time
- Promotional Videos
  - Mercenary Man
  - Head up High
  - Falling to Pieces
  - Breaking the Silence

== Audio CD ==
Live Premonition was also released as a stand-alone double audio CD - disc one containing the first ten songs of the DVD, while disc two held the remaining twelve.

== Unreleased song ==
The song "Perasmenes mou Agapes" was played at the filming of the DVD, but had to be cut for copyright reasons. Fan filmed footage of this song has surfaced, though. One of the on-stage cameramen can be seen on this recording, proving it to be from the night of the taping.
