= Mystic Prophecy =

German power metal band

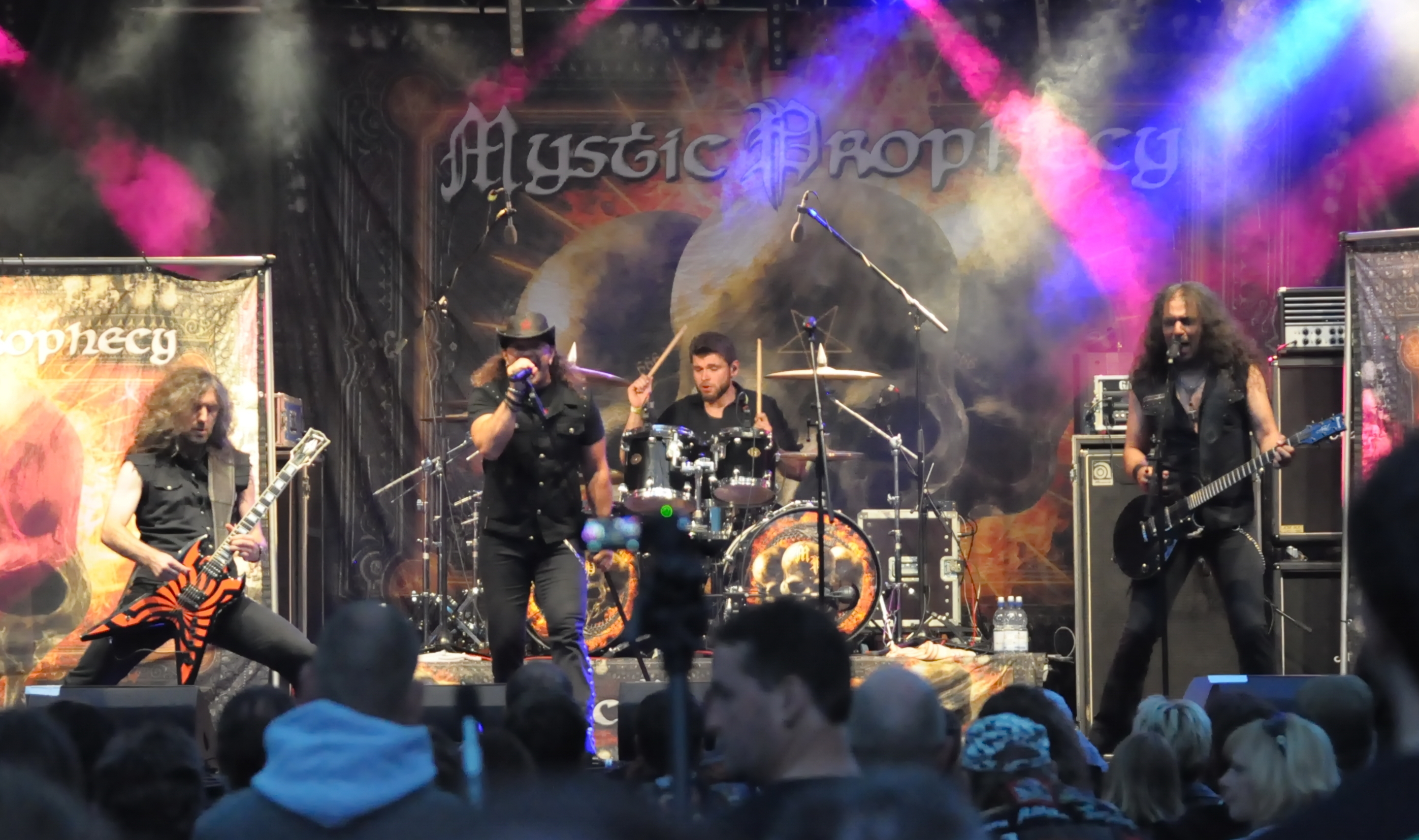
- Mystic Prophecy performing in 2015

Background information
- Origin: Bad Grönenbach, Germany
- Genres: Power metal, heavy metal
- Years active: 2000–present
- Labels: Nuclear Blast (2003–2005); Massacre (2006–2019); ROAR (2019–present)
- Members: Roberto Dimitri Liapakis; Markus Pohl; Joey Roxx; Hanno Kerstan; Evan K
- Past members: Martin Albrecht; Gus G Dennis Ekdahl; Martin Grimm; Mathias Straub; Stefan Dittrich; Constantine; Connie Andreszka; Laki Ragazas; Tristan Maiwurm
- Website: www.mysticprophecy.net

Mystic Prophecy is a German power metal band from Bad Grönenbach. Their sound has been described as heavy and melodic, similar to American power metal bands such as Iced Earth, due to their melodic riffing and powerful drumming.

== History ==
The band was formed in 2000 by Valley's Eve bandmates R.D. Liapakis and Martin Albrecht. Greek guitarist Gus G was recommended to them by David T. Chastain and played all guitars on their first three albums. However, he left in 2005 to focus on his own band, Firewind.

Since then, the band has undergone several lineup changes, with singer R.D. Liapakis and guitarist Markus Pohl, who joined in 2005, being the only long-term members.

The current lineup includes bassist Joey Roxx and drummer Hanno Kerstan. In August 2017, the band announced the addition of new guitarist Evan K.

Since 2001, Mystic Prophecy has released 12 albums. Their ninth album, War Brigade, released in 2016 with Massacre Records, became their best-selling album up to that point. It includes some of their most well-known songs, such as "Metal Brigade", "The Crucifix", "Burning Out", and "War Panzer".

In January 2018, the band released Monuments Uncovered, an album featuring metal covers of famous rock hits from the '70s and '80s, including "You Keep Me Hangin' On" (Kim Wilde/The Supremes), "Shadow on the Wall" (Mike Oldfield), "I'm Still Standing" (Elton John), and "Because the Night" (Patti Smith), among others.

In January 2020, Mystic Prophecy released their 11th album, Metal Division. Within days of its release, the album reached #20 on the German charts and became a hit in the metal genre on the iTunes charts in countries such as Germany (#7), the US (#23), and Canada (#11). It also became an Amazon bestseller. The album's release was accompanied by the singles and music videos "Metal Division", "Eye to Eye", and "Dracula", followed by a tour.

== Band members ==
Current

- Roberto Dimitri Liapakis – vocals (2000–present)
- Markus Pohl – rhythm guitar (2005–present)
- Joey Roxx – bass (2016–present)
- Hanno Kerstan – drums (2016–present)
- Evan K – lead guitar (2017–present)

Former

- Martin Albrecht – bass (2000–2008)
- Gus G – lead and rhythm guitar (2000–2005)
- Dennis Ekdahl – drums (2000–2004)
- Martin Grimm – lead guitar (2005–2008)
- Mathias Straub – drums (2005–2008)
- Stefan Dittrich – drums (2008–2009)
- Constantine Kotzamanis – lead guitar (2008–2013)
- Laki Ragazas – lead guitar (2013–2017)
- Claudio Sisto – drums (2010–2011)
- Connie Andreszka – bass (2008–2016)
- Tyrone Silva – drums (2011–2012)
- Tristan Maiwurm – drums (2012–2016)

Touring

- Klaus Sperling – drums (2004–2005)
- Matt C. – drums (2009)

== Discography ==
- Vengeance (2001)
- Regressus (2003)
- Never-Ending (2004)
- Savage Souls (2006)
- Satanic Curses (2007)
- Fireangel (2009)
- Ravenlord (2011)
- Killhammer (2013)
- War Brigade (2016)
- Monuments Uncovered (2018)
- Metal Division (2020)
- Hellriot (2023)
- In Metal (2026)
