= Firewind =

Greek power metal band

- Firewind in 2023

Background information
- Origin: Thessaloniki, Greece
- Genres: Power metal, heavy metal
- Years active: 1998, 2002–present
- Label: Century Media
- Members: Gus G Petros Christodoulidis; Johan Nunez; Henning Basse
- Past members: Bob Katsionis; Brandon Pender; Stephen Fredrick; Chitral Somapala; Kostas Exarhakis; Matt Scurfield; Brian Harris; Stian Kristoffersen; Mark Cross; Michael Ehré; Apollo Papathanasio; Herbie Langhans
- Website: firewind.gr

Firewind is a Greek power metal band formed in Thessaloniki in 1998. The group is currently signed to AFM records and was originally a small project created by guitarist Gus G. to showcase his demo, Nocturnal Symphony, in 1998. Firewind later became a full band over three years later when they recorded their debut album, Between Heaven and Hell. To date, the band has released ten studio albums and has been met with international success.

== History ==
=== Early history ===
The band began in 1998 when the young Greek Gus G. decided to record a demo on a 4-track recorder with some close musician friends in the United States as Gus "briefly attended Berklee College of Music in Boston". The project was entitled Firewind, and was used as a showcase for Gus' guitar skills in an attempt to earn a professional recording deal. Gus G. was quoted as saying, "Firewind, the second Electric Sun album, that's where I got the band name from."R.Y.A.N. - Season 2, Episode 4: Gus G. The demo attracted the attention of Leviathan Records, but activity was put on hold when Gus was hired by Nightrage, Dream Evil, and Mystic Prophecy.

=== Between Heaven and Hell ===
After the release of his other bands' debut albums, Gus' attention returned to the Firewind project. Only he remained from the original formation - Leviathan owner David T. Chastain brought in vocalist Stephen Fredrick and drummer Brian Harris (both formerly of Kenziner), while Gus enlisted the help of bassist Konstantine. This line-up recorded the debut album Between Heaven and Hell.

=== Burning Earth ===
In 2003, new changes were instituted as drummer Stian Kristoffersen and bassist Petros Christo joined the band. Harris and Konstantine had been replaced as Gus was looking for a more permanent rhythm section that was prepared to tour. This lineup recorded Burning Earth and went on a tour of Japan with Rob Rock, but without vocalist Fredrick, who was not prepared to go on the road (despite prior guarantees to the contrary). At their October 2007 show at ProgPower USA, the band briefly reunited with Fredrick for a few songs off their first two albums.

=== Forged by Fire ===
Fredrick's replacement on the Burning the Earth Tour, singer Chitral "Chity" Somapala, was given the job full-time. Fellow touring member Bob Katsionis was also hired permanently to play keyboards. Firewind got a worldwide deal with Century Media by the end of that year.

A few months after Forged By Fire was released, Chitral left due to personal and musical differences with the rest of the band. When his replacement, Apollo Papathanasio (of Time Requiem), was found, it was also announced that Kristoffersen would be leaving, to be replaced by British drummer Mark Cross. The reason for the split was that Gus wanted to have a set of Greek-based musicians willing to make Firewind their number one priority (probably to end the virtual revolving door of members) and Stian's main band was the Norwegian outfit Pagan's Mind. Gus also left his roles in Dream Evil, Mystic Prophecy and Nightrage.

=== Allegiance and The Premonition ===
Between 2004 and 2006, the band recorded Allegiance, which was released in July 2006. From November to December 2006, they toured the UK supporting DragonForce with All That Remains. Firewind accomplished their 2006/2007 world tour in Copenhagen at the Scandinavian Prog Power festival on 10 November. The band went around the globe almost twice being on three continents including Asia, Africa, North America and Europe and played nearly 100 shows. The band went to Sweden to record The Premonition, which was released in 2008 and followed again by tours in Europe (with Kamelot) and North America (with Arch Enemy).

In November 2008, the band released their first DVD, Live Premonition, containing footage of their entire concert at their home town in Greece on 12 January of that year. The band toured with Stratovarius in the UK during May 2009. During this tour, they added two new songs to their setlist, "Losing Faith" and "Days of No Trust". "Losing Faith", which contains a line in the chorus "in the days of no trust", was eventually to appear on 2009's Days of Defiance. Shortly after this tour, Gus G went on to audition for Ozzy Osbourne in Los Angeles and landed the gig, becoming Ozzy's new guitarist and appearing on his 2010 album "Scream".

=== Days of Defiance ===
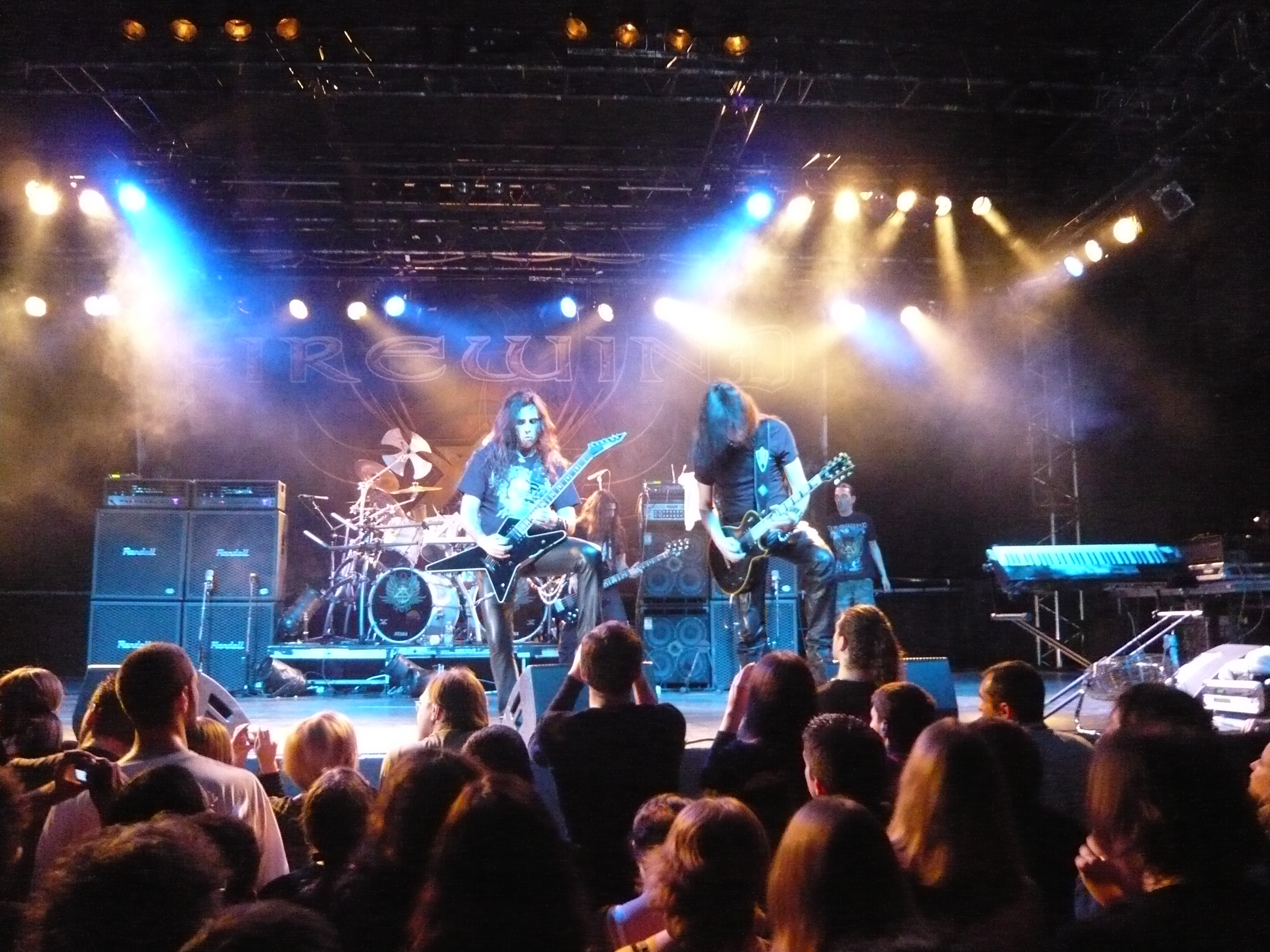
Firewind performing in 2008

At the end of September 2009, Firewind began work on their sixth studio album, the band confirmed that they have written twelve vocal and two instrumental songs.

On 13 January 2010, Firewind announced that they were parting ways with drummer Mark Cross (Tower of Babel, God's Army), with Michael Ehré (Uli Jon Roth, Metalium, Kee Marcello) playing at the live Mexico shows. Those shows, however, were cancelled. On 7 May, the band recorded a cover of Judas Priest's "Breaking the Law" for a compilation CD by the magazine Metal Hammer. On 26 May, Firewind announced the name of their new album as Days of Defiance and confirmed Michael Ehré as a full-time member although Mark Cross had recorded all drums on the album.

On 6 August 2010, they confirmed an October release date for their sixth studio album Days of Defiance, and an August release date for the album's first single "World on Fire". On the weekend of 20–22 August, Gus G guest appeared on the radio show Full Metal Jackie where he premièred a second song from the album, titled "Embrace the Sun".

Almost a year after the release of Days of Defiance, Firewind did a European headlining tour, with Mats Levén as a replacement for Apollo who couldn't make the European leg of the tour and a US headlining tour. Gus has said in an interview that Firewind will probably do a South America(this never happened) tour after the US tour and then enter the studio for a new album. Also has Michael Ehré left Firewind and Johan Nunez of Nightrage replaced him on the tours and now is a full member of the band.

=== Few Against Many ===
Johan Nunez joined the session for the seventh studio album as drummer in Valve Studio in Greece.

Firewind debuted two songs, "Wall of Sound" and "Losing My Mind", from their seventh studio album at headlining shows in Greece. The band has been confirmed for the Summer Breeze Festival and the Masters of Rock festival. In early 2012, Firewind and Century Media have announced that Firewind has re-signed with the label and that they will be releasing the new album titled "Few Against Many" 21 May in Europe and 22 May in North America. Firewind's second album was re-released throughout Japan with two bonus tracks in February 2012. The band was confirmed to perform at the Download Festival in June 2012.

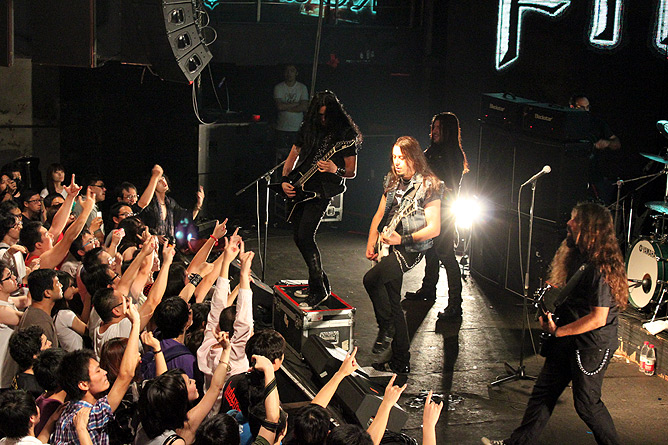
Firewind performing live in Shanghai

On 5 September 2012, Firewind released a music video entitled "Edge of a Dream" that features Apocalyptica. It was taken from their Few Against Many album released by Century Media Records earlier that year. Later in September 2012, Firewind announced that they would play four anniversary live shows in Greece in December (counting from the release date of Between Heaven and Hell), to celebrate their 10 years of existence. The shows took place on 15 and 16 December in Thessaloniki, and on 20 and 21 December in Athens. The band played different set lists each night in each city. The shows, as the band repeatedly announced were recorded for a live cd release in 2013. Anniversary merchandise was also sold at the venues. On 15 January 2013 Firewind announced that vocalist Apollo Papathanasio had quit the band due to not being able to keep up with the band's touring and promotion schedule.

On 15 January 2013, the band announced that Kelly Sundown Carpenter (Adagio, Beyond Twilight, Outworld, Darkology) would replace Apollo Papathanasio on vocals for their 2013 North American Tour. During an interview in June 2013 with Metal Shock Finland's Blackdiamond, Gus mentioned Kelly as a fantastic singer and also he stated that they have no plans to record a new studio album yet.

=== Immortals ===
In July 2016, Firewind entered the studio to begin recording a new album. In November 2016, it was announced that the album, titled Immortals, had been completed and would be released on 20 January 2017. On 25 November, the band released the first single from this album, entitled "Hands of Time".

=== Self-titled album and Stand United ===
In May 2019, it was announced by Gus G. that they would enter the studio to start working on a follow-up to Immortals in August of that year. However, on 9 March 2020, it was announced that Bob Katsionis would be leaving the band in order to focus on his studio work and his other projects. They also parted ways with singer Henning Basse, because of personal reasons, which may prevent him from continuing with the band, with Herbie Langhans, who worked with Sinbreed and Avantasia, replacing Basse on vocals. They also announced that the next album (with vocals finished by Langhans) would be released in 2020. On 20 March 2020, the band premiered a new single, "Rising Fire", which is included on the band's self-titled album, released on 15 May 2020.

Firewind's tenth studio album Stand United was released on March 1, 2024.

=== Gods, Myths & Titans ===
On November 20, 2025, it was announced that Langhans had parted ways with the band, and that Basse had returned as the lead vocalist. Their second album with Basse and first since his return, Gods, Myths & Titans, will be released on February 19, 2027.

== Band members ==
Current

- Gus G. – lead guitar, backing vocals (1998, 2002–present), rhythm guitar, keyboards (1998, 2002–2004, 2020–present), bass (1998)
- Petros Christodoulidis – bass, backing vocals (2003–present)
- Johan Nunez – drums (2011–present)
- Henning Basse – lead vocals (2015–2020, 2025–present; touring 2007)

Touring

- Mats Levén – lead vocals (2011)
- Kelly Sundown Carpenter – lead vocals (2013–2015)
- Percy Trayanov - bass, backing vocals (2022–present)

Former

- Brandon Pender – lead vocals (1998)
- Stephen Fredrick – lead vocals (2002–2004)
- Chitral Somapala – lead vocals (2004–2006)
- Apollo Papathanasio – lead vocals (2006–2013)
- Bob Katsionis – keyboards, rhythm guitar, backing vocals (2004–2020)
- Kostas "Konstantine" Exarhakis – bass (2002–2003)
- Matt Scurfield – drums (1998)
- Brian Harris – drums (2002–2003)
- Stian Kristoffersen – drums (2003–2006)
- Mark Cross – drums (2006–2010)
- Michael Ehré – drums (2010–2011)
- Herbie Langhans – lead vocals (2020–2025)

== Discography ==
Studio albums

- Between Heaven and Hell (2002)
- Burning Earth (2003)
- Forged by Fire (2005)
- Allegiance (2006)
- The Premonition (2008)
- Days of Defiance (2010)
- Few Against Many (2012)
- Immortals (2017)
- Firewind (2020)
- Stand United (2024)
- Gods, Myths & Titans (2027)

Live albums

- Live Premonition (2008)
- Apotheosis - Live 2012 (2013)
- Still Raging - 20th Anniversary Show - Live at Principal Club Theatre (2023)

Compilation albums

- Melody and Power (2002)
- Century Media Records: Covering 20 Years of Extreme (2008)

DVDs

- Live Premonition (2008)

Demo albums

- Nocturnal Symphony (1998)

Singles

- "Falling to Pieces" (2006)
- "Breaking the Silence" (2007)
- "Mercenary Man" (2008)
- "World on Fire" (2010)
- "Embrace the Sun" (2011)
- "Wall of Sound" (2012)
- "Hands of Time" (2016)
- "Ode to Leonidas" (2016)
- "Rising Fire" (2020)

Music videos

- "I am the Anger" (2003)
- "The Fire and the Fury" (2004)
- "Tyranny" (2005)
- "Falling to Pieces" (2006)
- "Breaking the Silence" (2007)
- "Mercenary Man" (2008)
- "Head Up High" (2008)
- "World on Fire" (2010)
- "Embrace the Sun" (2011)
- "Wall of Sound" (2012)
- "Edge of a Dream" (feat. Apocalyptica) (2012)
- "Ode to Leonidas" (2016)
- "Lady of 1000 Sorrows" (2017)
- "We Defy" (2018)
- "Rising Fire" (2020)
- "Welcome To The Empire" (2020)
- "Devour" (2021)
- "New Found Power" (2021)
