= Savage Souls (album) =

Studio album by Mystic Prophecy
- Released: 24 February 2006
- Recorded: October 2005
- Studios: Prophecy & Music Factory studios, Germany
- Genres: Heavy metal, power metal
- Label: Massacre Records
- Producers: R.D Liapakis & Fredrik Nordström

Mystic Prophecy chronology
Never-Ending (2004)	Savage Souls (2006)	Satanic Curses (2007)

Professional ratings
Review scores
Source	Rating
Darkscene.at	8.5/10
Heavymetal.dk	7/10
Metal.de	9/10
Musikreviews.de	9/15

Savage Souls is the fourth studio album by German power metal band Mystic Prophecy. A limited edition digibook version of the album was released including a DVD of the band performing most of the tracks live.

== Track listing ==
1. "Shadow Beyond My Soul" (Liapakis / Pohl) - 4:18
2. "Master of Sins" (Liapakis / Grimm) - 4:30
3. "Evil Empires" (Liapakis / Albrecht) - 4:16
4. "Savage Souls" (Liapakis / Albrecht) - 4:30
5. "In the Darkness" (Liapakis / Albrecht) - 5:10
6. "Deception of Hate" (Liapakis / Pohl / Grimm) - 3:56
7. "Sins and Sorrows" (Liapakis / Pohl / Grimm) - 4:26
8. "Best Days of My Life" (Liapakis / Albrecht / Grimm) - 4:30
9. "Nightmares of Demons" (Liapakis / Pohl) - 4:08
10. "Victim of Fate" (Liapakis / Grimm) - 4:34
11. "Into the Fire" (Liapakis / Albrecht) - 15:14

Track 11 ends at 5:30. After 9 minutes and 10 seconds of silence (5:30 - 14:40), there is a hidden spoken outro.

== Personnel ==
- Roberto Dimitri Liapakis – vocals
- Martin Grimm – guitars
- Markus Pohl – guitars
- Martin Albrecht – bass
- Mattias Straub – drums
