= Regressus =

Studio album by Mystic Prophecy
- Released: June 2003
- Studios: Prophecy & Music Factory Studios, Germany
- Genre: Power metal
- Length: 50:50
- Label: Nuclear Blast
- Producer: R.D Liapakis

Mystic Prophecy chronology
Vengeance (2001)	Regressus (2003)	Never-Ending (2004)

Professional ratings
Review scores
Source	Rating
Scream Magazine	4/6

Regressus is the second studio album by German power metal group Mystic Prophecy.

The album was rated a 4 out of 5 by The Metal Crypt.

== Track listing ==
- All lyrics by R.D Liapakis
- All music by R.D. Liapakis and Gus G. except track 6 by Martin Albrecht
- All songs arranged by R.D. Liapakis and Gus G.
1. "Calling from Hell" – 4:31
2. "Eternal Flame" – 4:44
3. "Lords Of Pain" – 4:30
4. "Sign of the Cross" – 4:01
5. "Night of the Storm" - 4:24
6. "The Traveller" (instrumental) – 0:50
7. "In Your Sins" – 4:56
8. "Forgotten Soul" – 3:36
9. "When Demons Return" – 4:44
10. "Regressus / Lost in Time" – 5:24
11. "Mystic Prophecy" – 4:27
12. "The Land of the Dead" – 4:43
13. "Fighting the World" (cover)

== Personnel ==
- Roberto Dimitri Liapakis – vocals
- Gus G. – guitars
- Martin Albrecht – bass
- Dennis Ekdahl – drums
