= Gus G =

Greek guitarist (born 1980)

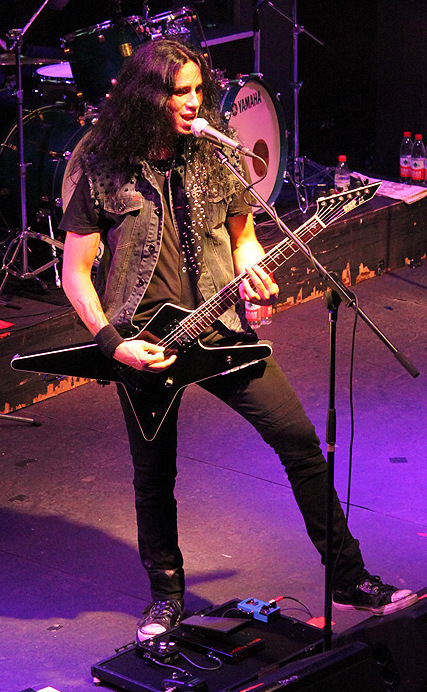
- Gus G live with Firewind

Background information
- Also known as: Gus G.
- Born: Konstantinos Karamitroudis; 12 September 1980 (age 46); Thessaloniki, Greece
- Genres: Heavy metal, melodic death metal, thrash metal, power metal, black metal, neoclassical metal
- Occupations: Musician, songwriter
- Instrument: Guitar
- Years active: 1998–present
- Label: Century Media Records
- Member of: Firewind
- Formerly of: Ozzy Osbourne, Mystic Prophecy, Dream Evil, Nightrage, Arch Enemy, Kamelot, Angel Vivaldi, Project: Aegis
- Website: gusgofficial.com

Konstantinos Karamitroudis (Greek: Κωνσταντίνος (Κώστας) Καραμητρούδης; born 12 September 1980), better known as Gus G, is a Greek heavy metal guitarist. He currently plays with his band Firewind. He has also played in Mystic Prophecy, Nightrage, Arch Enemy, Dream Evil and Ozzy Osbourne's band. He is currently touring with King Diamond after the departure of longtime guitarist Andy LaRocque.

== Biography ==
=== Early life ===
Gus was born on 12 September 1980 in Thessaloniki. His father was a part-time singer who sang Greek folk music at bars and taverns. He was also a fan of rock music. He was introduced to bands like Pink Floyd, Santana and the Eagles by his father's album collections. Gus G was inspired to start playing guitar after listening to his father's copy of Peter Frampton's album Frampton Comes Alive. Gus has stated, "Frampton Comes Alive, specifically, was the reason why I picked up the guitar and started playing." He was drawn in particular by Frampton's use of the Talkbox. Gus stated, "I was like 8 or 9 years old and my dad had the vinyl at home and was playing that song 'Do You Feel Like We Do,' and when he was doing all that talkbox effects and making the guitar talk...I somehow thought it was a robot talking...I was just amazed by it. It was one of those epiphanies we get in life." At the age of 10, Gus asked his dad for a guitar. His father bought him a classical guitar and he started to take lessons from a local music school. When he finally received his first electric guitar at the age of 14, he got heavily into practicing and took lessons from a rock guitar teacher at a local conservatory.

=== Career ===
At the age of 18 he left Greece to enroll in the Berklee College of Music, but left after only a few weeks and began working on making a name on the metal scene. During his brief time at Berklee, Gus came into contact with Joe Stump, who he credits as a great influence on his career. In 1998, Gus G decided to record a demo with some close musician friends in the United States. The project was entitled Firewind, and was used as a showcase for Gus's guitar skills in an attempt to earn a professional recording deal. The demo attracted the attention of Leviathan Records, but activity was put on hold when Gus was hired by Nightrage, Dream Evil, and Mystic Prophecy. After the release of these bands' debut albums, Gus's attention returned to his band, Firewind. The band has released seven studio albums to date and has gone through many lineup changes. Gus G was declared third of the three best guitar players all over the world in 2003 by the Japanese magazine BURRN!.

In 2009, Gus was sent an email invitation from Ozzy Osbourne's management to learn several songs and take a flight to Los Angeles to audition for the role of guitarist in Ozzy Osbourne's backing band. After jamming with the band, Gus was "asked on the spot to come back and perform a concert with Ozzy a couple of months later". Soon thereafter it was announced that Gus G would be taking the place of lead guitarist for Ozzy Osbourne. Ozzy had decided to part ways with longtime guitarist Zakk Wylde, because he thought his music was beginning to sound too much like Zakk's band Black Label Society. Gus's first live appearance with Ozzy was at the BlizzCon 2009.

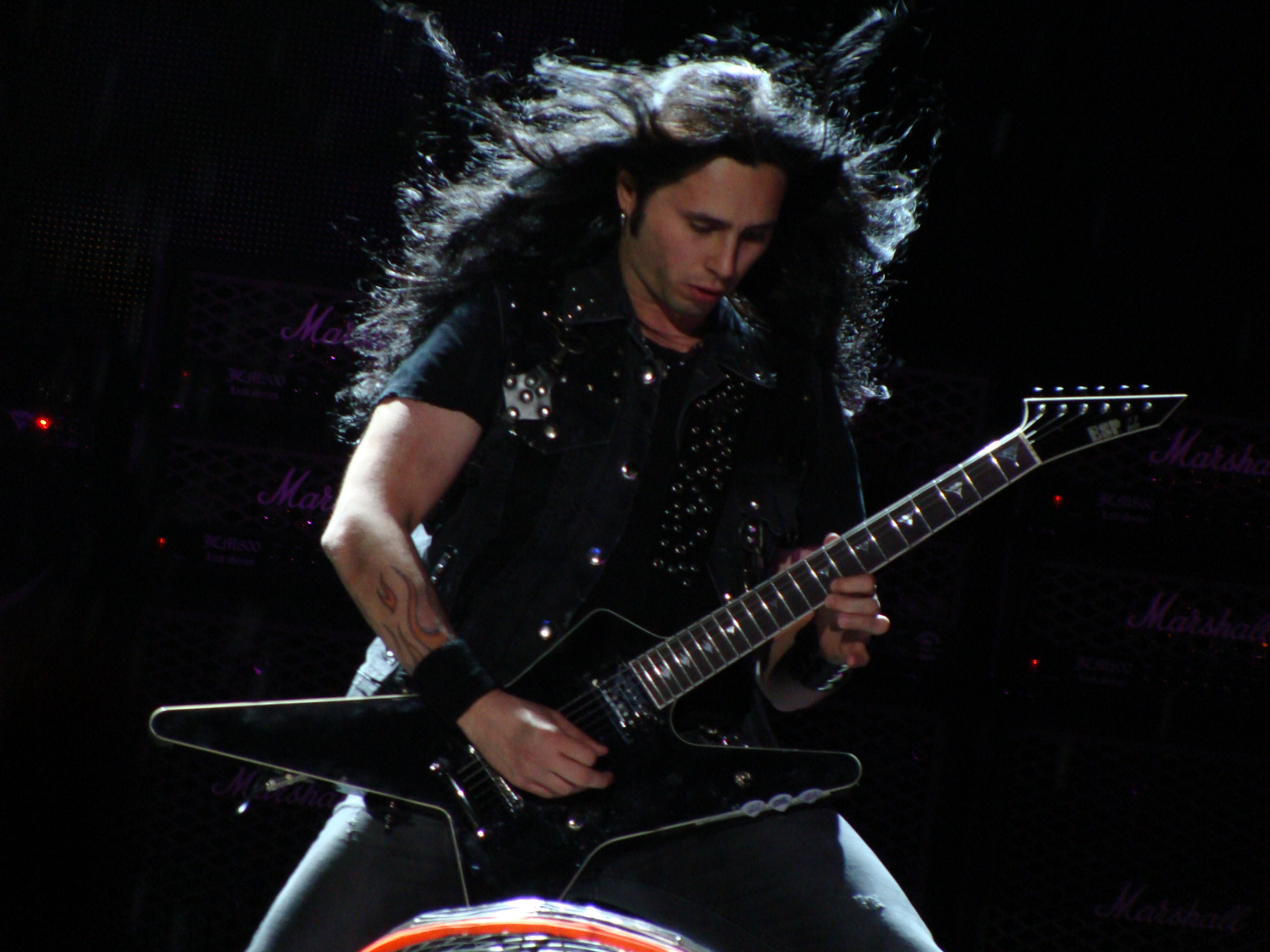
Gus G performing with Ozzy Osbourne

In 2010 Gus G appeared alongside Firewind in Issue 3 of the Eternal Descent Comic Book which is an epic comic series that features characters of several of ESP Guitars' most popular artists.

In the summer of 2012 he toured with Ozzy Osbourne as part of the Ozzy & Friends European Tour. The line-up featured special guests Slash, Zakk Wylde, and Geezer Butler. He then returned to his band Firewind, and they released their 7th studio album "Few Against Many". The world tour that followed took them all over Europe, UK, North America, Asia and Australia. In the midst of the tour, Firewind's longtime singer, Apollo Papathanasio, quit the band. Firewind vowed to continue with a replacement singer. At the end of the world tour in December 2013, Firewind decided to go on an indefinite hiatus and Gus G launched his solo career with the release of his debut album, "I Am The Fire". The album was released in March 2014 and features many guest musicians including Jacob Bunton, Mats Levén, Jeff Scott Soto, Michael Starr of Steel Panther, Alexia Rodriguez of Eyes Set To Kill, Devour the Day and many more.

In February 2015, Gus said that he had written songs for a solo album with an intended summer release. He also noted that another Firewind album was not planned due to the lack of a suitable singer. On 24 July his second solo album, Brand New Revolution was released in Europe through Century Media.

On June 22, 2016, Gus G announced a partnership with Jackson Guitars. This resulted in the release of 2 new signature models that were unveiled at the NAMM Show 2017.

In April 2017, Gus exited Ozzy Osbourne's band after he was announced a farewell tour and reunion with former guitarist, Zakk Wylde. Gus is the 2nd longest serving guitarist in Ozzy's career after Zakk.

On September 15, 2017, Gus was honoured with the "God of Riffs" award at the German Metal Hammer Awards in Berlin.

On April 20, 2018, Gus G released his 3rd solo album "Fearless" through AFM Records. Following a power trio format the album features Dennis Ward on bass and vocals and Will Hunt (Evanescence) on drums.

During the pandemic years, Gus recorded and released his 4th solo album and first all instrumental one, "Quantum Leap". It was ranked at number 2 guitar album of the year by the readers of Guitar World Magazine.

On February 19, 2025, Gus performed with a classical orchestra for the first time at Megaron Athens Concert Hall. Together with the Camerata Friends of Music Orchestra, they performed Jon Lord's Sarabande album in its entirety.

On October 2, 2025, Gus partnered up with fellow Greek-French songwriter and rapper Vlospa for the latter's album Paidia Tou Feggariou, providing guitar recordings for the song "LOV€".

Gus released an EP titled Steel Burning Live exclusively in Japan on October 7, 2026. In addition to four live tracks, it includes covers of Black Sabbath's "The Mob Rules" and Iron Maiden's "Murders in the Rue Morgue", with the latter featuring vocals by Nicklas Sonne and a guitar solo by Saki.

=== Musical influences ===
Gus G's first influences began with Peter Frampton and his work "Frampton Comes Alive". When asked about Uli Jon Roth, Gus G stated, "'He's a guy that I took my band's name (Firewind) from. If you listen to Uli Jon Roth, what he was doing back in the 70s with the Scorpions, and of course, with Electric Sun, you'll see, "Ohh, now I know where all the 80s shredders like Yngwie and all those guys got their inspiration from. He's an original for me. He's like a true original like Blackmore. He's a mentor, a friend, and a guitar idol of mine." Gus also cites Al Di Meola, Joe Stump, John Norum, Steve Vai, John Petrucci, Yngwie Malmsteen, George Lynch, Uli Jon Roth, Michael Schenker, Paul Gilbert, Marty Friedman, Jimi Hendrix, Jimmy Page, Gary Moore, The Beatles, The Doors, Black Sabbath, Metallica, Iron Maiden, Joe Satriani and many others as his influences.

== Discography ==
Firewind

- Between Heaven and Hell (2002)
- Burning Earth (2003)
- Forged by Fire (2005)
- Allegiance (2006)
- The Premonition (2008)
- Live Premonition (2008)
- Days of Defiance (2010)
- Few Against Many (2012)
- Apotheosis – Live 2012 (2013)
- Immortals (2017)
- Firewind (2020)
- Stand United (2024)

Solo releases

- I Am the Fire (2014)
- Brand New Revolution (2015)
- Fearless (2018)
- Quantum Leap (2021)
- Steel Burner (2026)

Ozzy Osbourne

- iTunes Festival: London 2010 (2010)
- Scream (2010)

Dream Evil

- Dragonslayer (2002)
- Evilized (2003)
- Children of the Night (EP, 2003)
- The Book of Heavy Metal (2004)

Mystic Prophecy

- Vengeance (2001)
- Regressus (2003)
- Never-Ending (2004)

Nightrage

- Sweet Vengeance (2003)
- Descent into Chaos (2005)

Guest appearances

- Exhumation – Traumaticon (1999)
- Raise Hell – Not Dead Yet (2000)
- Dies Irae – Naive (2001)
- Dragonland – Holy War (2002)
- Old Man's Child – In Defiance of Existence (2003)
- Cans – Beyond the Gates (2004)
- Rotting Christ – Sanctus Diavolos (2004)
- Sigh – Gallows Gallery (2005)
- Imaginery – Long Lost Pride (2005)
- Arch Enemy – Doomsday Machine (2005)
- Dream Evil – United (2006)
- Rob Rock – Garden of Chaos (2007)
- Dew-Scented – Incinerate (2007)
- Heavenwood – Redemption (2008)
- Nightrage – Wearing a Martyr's Crown (2009)
- In This Moment - A Star-Crossed Wasteland (2010)
- Kamelot – Poetry for the Poisoned (2010)
- Hevisaurus – Räyh! (2011)
- Nightrage – Insidious (2011)
- Doro – Raise Your Fist (2012)
- Bob Katsionis – Rest in Keys (2012)
- Altitudes & Attitude – Altitudes & Attitude (EP, 2014)
- Place Vendome - Close to the Sun (2017)
- Jorn - Life On Death Road (2017)
- Jason Becker – Triumphant Hearts (2018)
- Andy James – Waking the Dead (2019)
- Orden Ogan – Final Days (2021)
- Mike Mangini – Freek of Nature (2023)
- Ron Coolen & Keith St. John – Here to Stay (2023)
- Bruce Dickinson – The Mandrake Project (2024)
- Saki – Pluvia (2026)

== Equipment ==
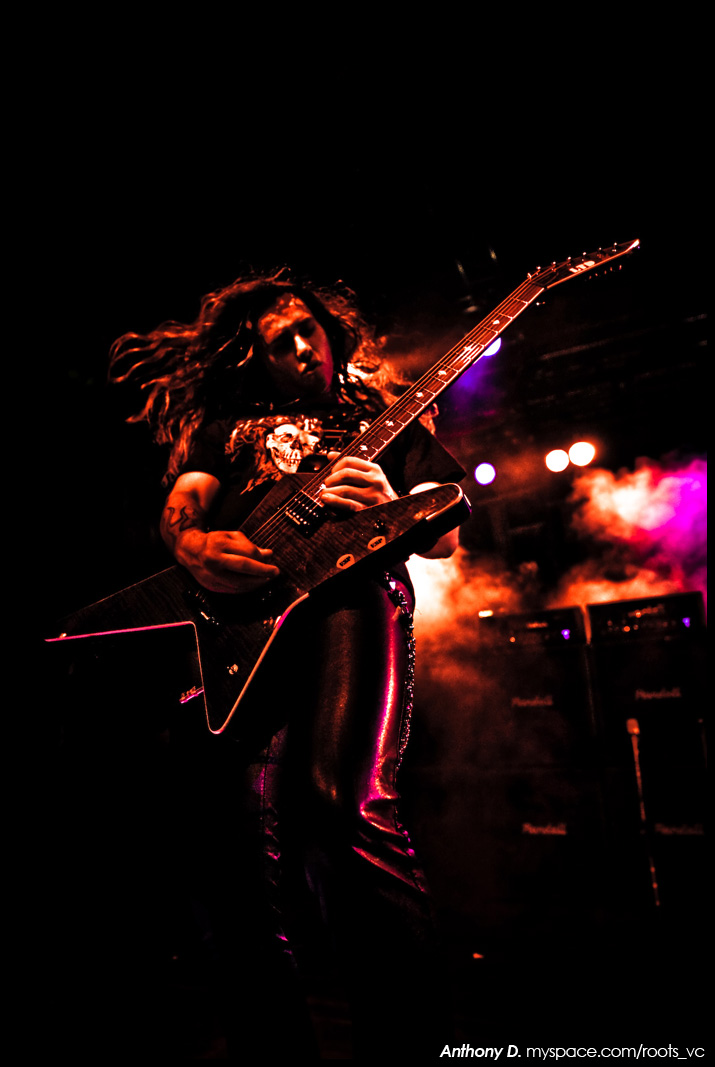
Gus G performing live with his signature ESP guitar

In 2005, Gus teamed up with ESP Guitars to make two custom model guitars to his specifications, the "Gus G. FR" and the "Gus G. NT". The 'NT' was used in the videos for "Falling to Pieces", "Breaking the Silence" and "Tyranny". The 'FR' is featured along with the NT model in the video for "Falling to Pieces" and "Head Up High" and was discontinued in 2009 for North America, being replaced by the 'NT'. In a 2009 video of Gus playing backstage at Musikmesse Frankfurt with his new T2 amplifier, he is seen with a white ESP Gus model with a black Firewind logo on the front. Before using ESP, he was endorsed by Washburn, playing a Culprit with a chrome pickguard, and before using a Fender Floyd Stratocaster. Recently Gus has released 2 new signature series guitars in Japan the ESP GUS G. NT-II which is a white version of his normal signature guitars with the Firewind symbol on the neck at 1–15 frets, and also in black on the body. And ESP GUS G. FM-NT which is the same as the GUS G. NT ESP, the only change made is to the frets who are now the same as at the ESP GUS G. NT-II. In March 2010 ESP announced a new Gus G guitar the EC Revolver, it has a custom graphic finish, 22 frets, a 25.5-inch scale, and Seymour Duncan Blackouts active pickups.

While playing with Ozzy Osbourne during the BlizzCon 2009 closing ceremony, he could be seen playing two ESP Eclipse II guitars, one in Amber Cherry Sunburst tuned to Standard D, and another one in Vintage Black, tuned to Dropped C.

In terms of picks and strings, he used Elixir Strings early in Firewind, then switched to DR, using 10-56. Currently he uses DR Dragon Skins 10-14-18-32-42-56. He currently uses Dunlop Jazz III XL 1.5mm guitar picks.

Gus has used various amps in the past including Randall T2 and V2 Amplifiers. Gus briefly had a signature Randall amp designed by him and based on the T2 head named Heaven and Hell. It featured 2 channels, each using independent gain and tone controls. Gus G here performs with Ozzy using 10 of his Signature Randall T2HH amps and cabs.

In January 2010, he teamed up and was featured on the Blackstar Amplification website using the Series One 200 head and matching cab.

In June 2010, Blackstar Amplification launched a Gus G. signature pedal HT-BLACKFIRE at Summer NAMM. The HT-BLACKFIRE is a two channel, valve-driven, metal distortion pedal and was launched at Summer NAMM in Nashville on 18 June 2010. However live he does not play this, rather he uses a BBE Green Screamer.

In September 2011, Blackstar announced they were working on a Gus G signature Series One amplifier. This was announced at a Blackstar, Andertons and Gus G masterclass session at The Boileroom in Guildford. The signature amp was released in 2012 and was named BLACKFIRE 200 based on the Series One 200 amp. It was made available at the limited number of 225 amps worldwide.

A detailed gear diagram of Gus G's 2011 Ozzy Osbourne guitar rig is well-documented. It is based on a 2011 interview with Gus G's guitar tech, Chet Haun.

2016 saw Gus G switching to Jackson Guitars shortly before heading out on his North American tour with Angel Vivaldi. They were based on the star design originally created by Wayne Charvel in the late 1970s and early 1980s. A signature guitar line with Jackson was revealed at NAMM 2016.
