= Never-Ending =

Studio album by Mystic Prophecy
- Released: October 2004
- Genre: Power metal
- Label: Nuclear Blast
- Producer: R.D Liapakis

Mystic Prophecy chronology
Regressus (2003)	Never-Ending (2004)	Savage Souls (2006)

Never-Ending is the third studio album by German power metal group Mystic Prophecy, released in October 2004. This is the last album of a trilogy and also the last to feature Gus G and Dennis Ekdahl.

It is rated an 8 out of 10 on Blabbermouth.net.

== Track listing ==
1. "Burning Bridges" (Liapakis / Albrecht) - 4:13
2. "Time Will Tell" (Liapakis / Gus G.) - 3:54
3. "Under A Darkened Sun" (Liapakis / Albrecht) - 4:08
4. "Dust Of Evil" (Liapakis / Gus G. / Albrecht) - 4:29
5. "In Hell" (Liapakis / Gus G.) - 3:33
6. "Never Surrender" (Liapakis / Gus G.) - 4:31
7. "Wings Of Eternity" (Liapakis / Albrecht) - 4:34
8. "When I'm Falling" (Liapakis / Gus G.) - 3:46
9. "Warriors Of Lies" (Liapakis / Albrecht) - 6:12
10. "Dead Moon Rising" (Liapakis / Gus G.) - 5:15
11. "Never Ending" (Liapakis / Gus G. / Albrecht) - 2:41

== Personnel ==
- Roberto Dimitri Liapakis – vocals
- Gus G – guitars
- Martin Albrecht – bass
- Dennis Ekdahl – drums
