= Apollo Papathanasio =

Swedish vocalist

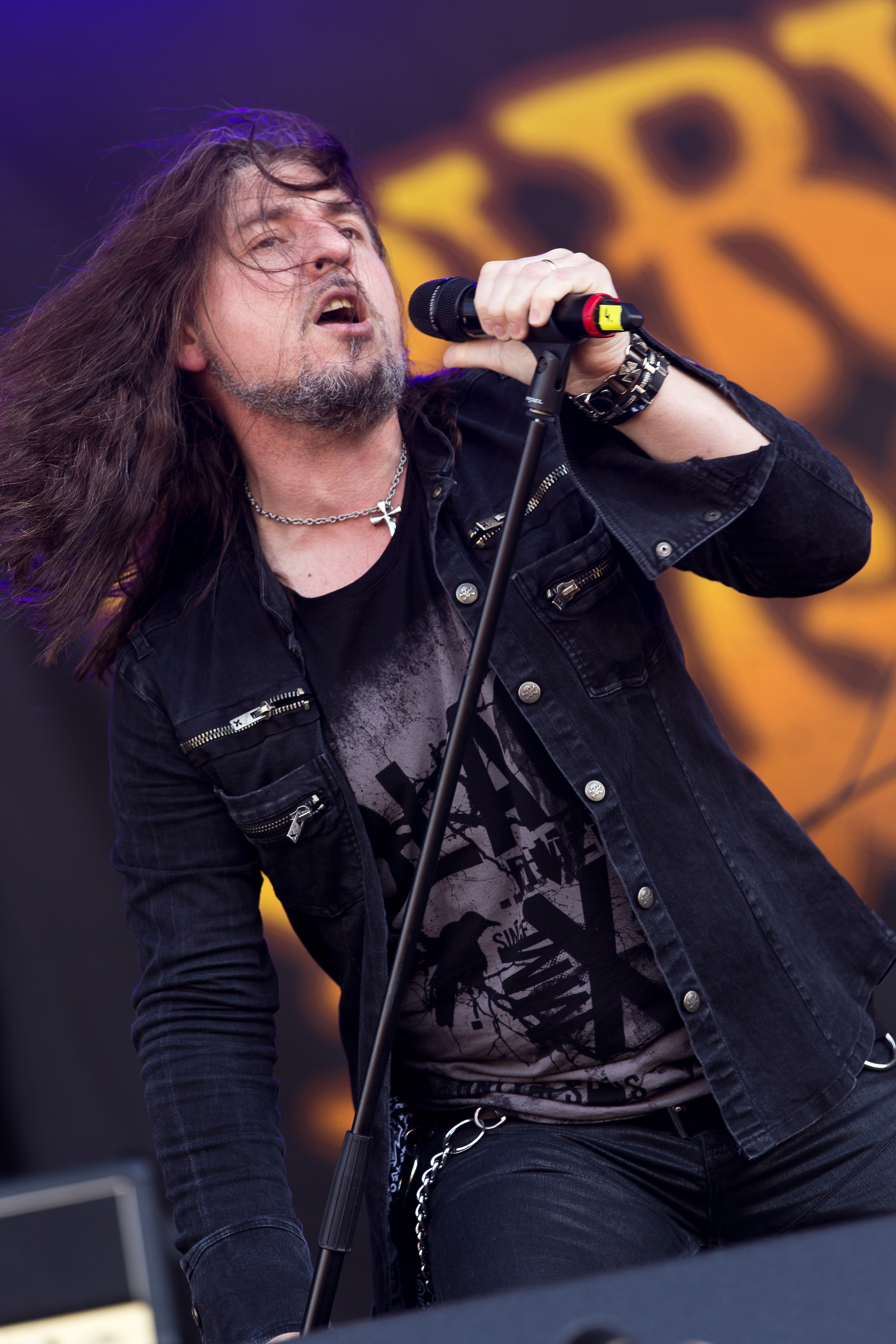
- Papathanasio with Spiritual Beggars at Rockharz Open Air 2016 in Germany

Background information
- Born: Apostolos Papathanasio; 15 March 1969 (age 57); Borås, Sweden
- Genres: Heavy metal, power metal, stoner metal
- Occupation: Musician
- Instruments: Vocals, guitar
- Years active: 1997–present

Apostolos "Apollo" Papathanasiou (Greek: Aπόστολος Παπαθανασίου or Απόλλωνας Παπαθανασίου; born 15 March 1969) is a Swedish heavy metal vocalist of Greek descent, who is currently with the band Spiritual Beggars. He has also sung for Firewind, Meduza, Evil Masquerade, Gardenian, and Richard Andersson's projects Majestic and Time Requiem.

In 2007, Papathanasio had to opt out of certain tour dates with Firewind. His position was temporarily filled by Henning Basse of Metalium. Apollo's last release with Firewind was "Few Against Many" (2012). On 15 January 2013, Firewind announced that the band had parted ways with Apollo. After his departure from Firewind he has continued on with Spiritual Beggars and released return to zero (2010), Earth Blues, 15 April 2013 and Sunrise to Sundown (2016). Papathanasio also works as a music teacher for a school in Halmstad.

== Discography ==
=== Faith Taboo ===
- 1997: Psychopath

=== Majestic ===
- 2000: Trinity Overture

=== Time Requiem ===
- 2002: Time Requiem
- 2003: Unleashed in Japan
- 2004: The Inner Circle of Reality

=== Meduza ===
- 2002: Now and Forever
- 2004: Upon the World

=== Sandalinas ===
- 2005: Living on the Edge

=== Evil Masquerade ===
- 2006: Third Act
- 2009: Fade to Black
- 2012: Black Ravens Cry (single)
- 2012: A Silhouette (single)
- 2012: Pentagram
- 2014: 10 Years in the Dark - remastered compilation
- 2016: The Outcast Hall of Fame

=== Firewind ===
- 2006: Allegiance
- 2008: The Premonition
- 2010: Days of Defiance
- 2012: Few Against Many

=== Bassinvaders ===
- 2008: Hellbassbeaters

=== Spiritual Beggars ===
- 2010: Return to Zero
- 2013: Earth Blues
- 2016: Sunrise To Sundown

=== Apollo (solo) ===
- 2016: Waterdevils

=== Other works ===
- 2005: Vitalij Kuprij - Revenge
- 2010: Sebastien - Tears of White Roses
- 2011: Nightrage - Insidious
- 2011: The MFC Dragon Slayer All Star Project - Let's Unite in Rock (single)
- 2012: Kamelot - Grace (bonus track)
