= Bob Katsionis =

Greek heavy metal guitarist and keyboardist

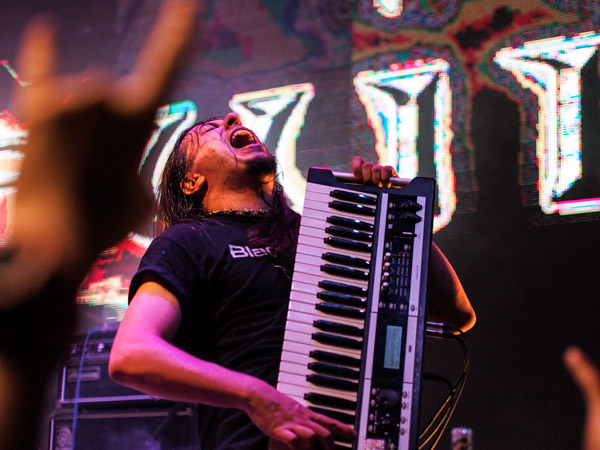
- Bob Katsionis performing live in 2012

Background information
- Born: Charalambos Katsionis; February 17, 1977 (age 49)
- Origin: Athens, Greece
- Genres: Heavy metal, neo-classical metal, progressive metal, power metal
- Occupation: Musician
- Instruments: Keyboard, guitar
- Years active: 1996–present
- Website: symmetricrecords.bandcamp.com/artists

Babis "Bob" Katsionis (Greek: Μπάμπης Κατσιώνης; born February 17, 1977, in Athens, Greece) is a Greek guitarist and keyboardist and the lead guitarist and keyboard player for the heavy metal/power metal bands Stray Gods, Warrior Path, Outloud, and Serious Black; he was part of Firewind, before leaving in 2020 for personal reasons. He is the only musician to ever win the same category "Best Keyboardist" in Greek Metal Hammer's Annual Readers' Polls for 5 years in a row (2006–2011). He is founder of Progressive Vision Group, a videoclip making company, which has produced more than 230 videos for rock and metal artists since 2002.

In 2014 he started his own records label "Symmetric Records" to help bands and artists he produced/worked with in Sound Symmetry Studio release their works. To date, Symmetric Records has 14 official releases, with Warrior Path's "The Mad King" being the most successful.

== Appearances ==
Katsionis has appeared in various small-time bands over the years (Skyward, Retrospect etc.), most of them projects he developed himself, before gaining more recognition with the likes of Firewind and Outloud.

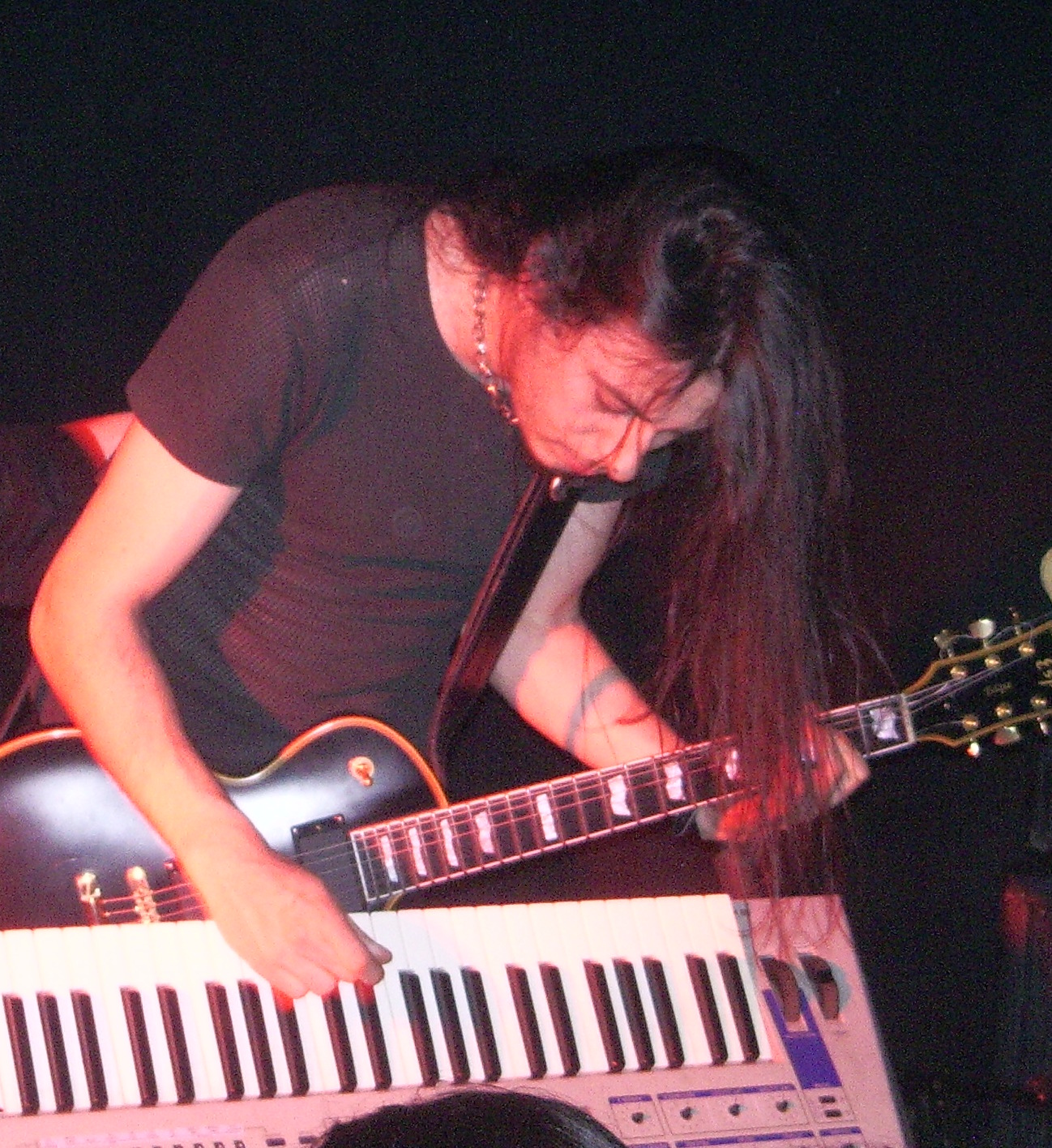
Bob Katsionis performing live in 2007.

He started playing keyboards when he was 10 years old and, four years later, began learning guitar. Bob cites Kevin Moore, Jens Johansson and Keith Emerson as his main keyboard influences. As well as playing keyboards, Bob is also a seven string guitar player and has played both instruments in his various bands. For instance, when Firewind play live, he performs in a dual role as keyboard player or rhythm guitarist (or both), depending on the song. He uses a standard six-string guitar in these circumstances. Bob also has released three instrumental albums with his solo project resembling mostly jazzy neo-classical/progressive metal. and has also joined his idol Timo Tolkki (ex-Stratovarius) band Revolution Renaissance for the recording of their album "Trinity" without making any live appearances.

He released his 4th solo album titled "Rest In Keys" in December 2012, followed by "Prognosis & Synopsis" (2016) and the experimental album titled "Amadeus Street Warrior" which was a 16-bit fictional game soundtrack.

After Bob filled in live for Roland Grapow on their tour with Hammerfall (January–February 2015), Serious Black announced him as a full-time member in February 2015.

== Bands currently featuring Bob Katsionis ==
- Warrior Path
- Outloud
- Serious Black
- Stray Gods

== Past bands and/or projects ==
- Firewind
- Revolution Renaissance
- Kamelot (as co-writer)
- Nightfall
- Septic Flesh
- Warrior Path
- Wonders (ITA)
- Validor (GR)
- Casus Belli
- Suicidal Angels (as guest, on Torment Payback)
- Scar Of The Sun (as guest and co-writer)
- Keado Mores (as guest and producer)
- Encomium
- Fatal Morgana (guest for Rock Of Gods 1996 Festival)
- Imaginary
- Power Quest (as guest)
- Eldritch (as guest)
- NTX (Greek crossover band Nipto Tas Xeiras)
- Battleroar (as guest)
- Skyward (later became Retrospect)
- Mirage (later became Imaginary)
- Eternal Voyager (as guest)
- Tragedian (as guest on "Casting Shadows" on the album Unholy Divine)

== Discography ==
=== Firewind ===
- Forged By Fire (2005)
- Allegiance (2006)
- The Premonition (2008)
- Days of Defiance (2010)
- Few Against Many (2012)
- Immortals (2017)

=== Outloud ===
- We'll Rock You To Hell and Back Again (2009)
- Love Catastrophe (2011)
- More Catastrophe E.P (2012)
- Let's Get Serious (2014)
- Destination: Overdrive (The Best of Outloud) (2017)
- Virtual Hero Society (2018)

=== Warrior Path ===
- Warrior Path (2019)
- The Mad KIng (2021)

=== Stray Gods ===
- Storm The Walls (2021)
- Olympus (2023)

=== Serious Black ===
- MirrorWorld (2016)
- Magic (2017)
- Vengeance Is Mine (2022)

=== Imaginary ===
- Oceans Divine (2001)
- Long Lost Pride (2005)

=== Nightfall ===
- I am Jesus (Black Lotus records) 2002
- Lyssa: Rural Gods And Astonishing Punishments (2004)

=== Star Queen ===
- Faithbringer (2002)

=== Bob Katsionis ===
- Turn Of My Century (2002)
- Imaginary Force (2004)
- Noemon (2008)
- Rest in Keys (2012)
- Prognosis & Synopsis (2018)
- Amadeus Street Warrior (2020)
