= Mark Cross (musician) =

English drummer

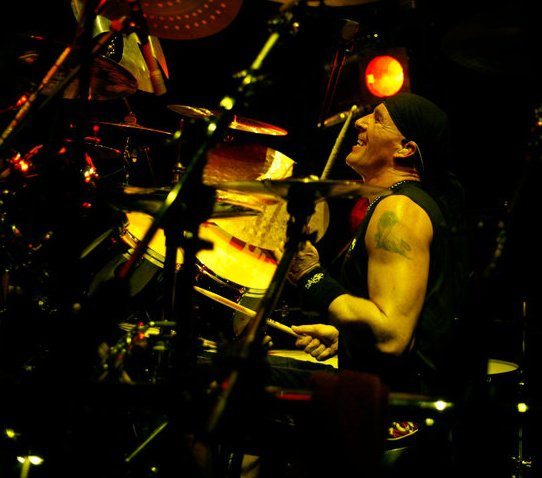
- Mark Cross

Background information
- Instruments: Drum kit
- Formerly of: Metalium, Helloween, Kingdom Come, Firewind
- Website: mcross.com

Mark Cross is a hard rock and heavy metal drummer of English/German descent. He has played in many bands in his career and is currently based in London, England. Cross recorded in 1992 an album with Greek singer/songwriter Michalis Rakintzis named "Etsi Maresei" featuring also Deep Purple singer Ian Gillan.

Cross left Helloween in 2002 due to illness. He had recorded two tracks with them, both of which featured on their Rabbit Don't Come Easy album in 2003.

In 2005 he featured as a session and touring musician for At Vance and also appeared on the British rock band Saracen's latest album, Vox in Excelso and Winter's Bane's comeback album, Redivivus.

With Firewind he released Allegiance in 2006 they supported Dragonforce across Europe and the UK and went on an two-year world tour through three continents, playing more than 160 shows. Supporting their forthcoming album The Premonition, which was released in April 2008 Firewind toured Europe and North America alongside Swedish metallers Arch Enemy and in Japan with Kamelot. After recording their 6th studio album, Days of Defiance, on 13 January 2010, Cross announced that he and Firewind had split.

In the following decade Cross released three albums with the band Outloud, We'll Rock You to Hell... (2009), Love Catastrophe (2011), and the Christmas special More Catastrophe! (2012). With God's Army, also three albums God's Army AD (2014), Demoncracy (2018), and Warriors of the Wasteland (2021). and with UK rock band Tainted Nation the album F.E.A.R. (2012) and On the Outside (2016).

Cross played with the Scorpions in Bahrain on 4 April 2014 at the Gulf Formula 1 Grand Prix.

In 2023 he recorded and produced Joe Stump's Tower of Babel's latest album Days of Thunder which was released by Silver Lining Music in 2025.
