= Petros Christo =

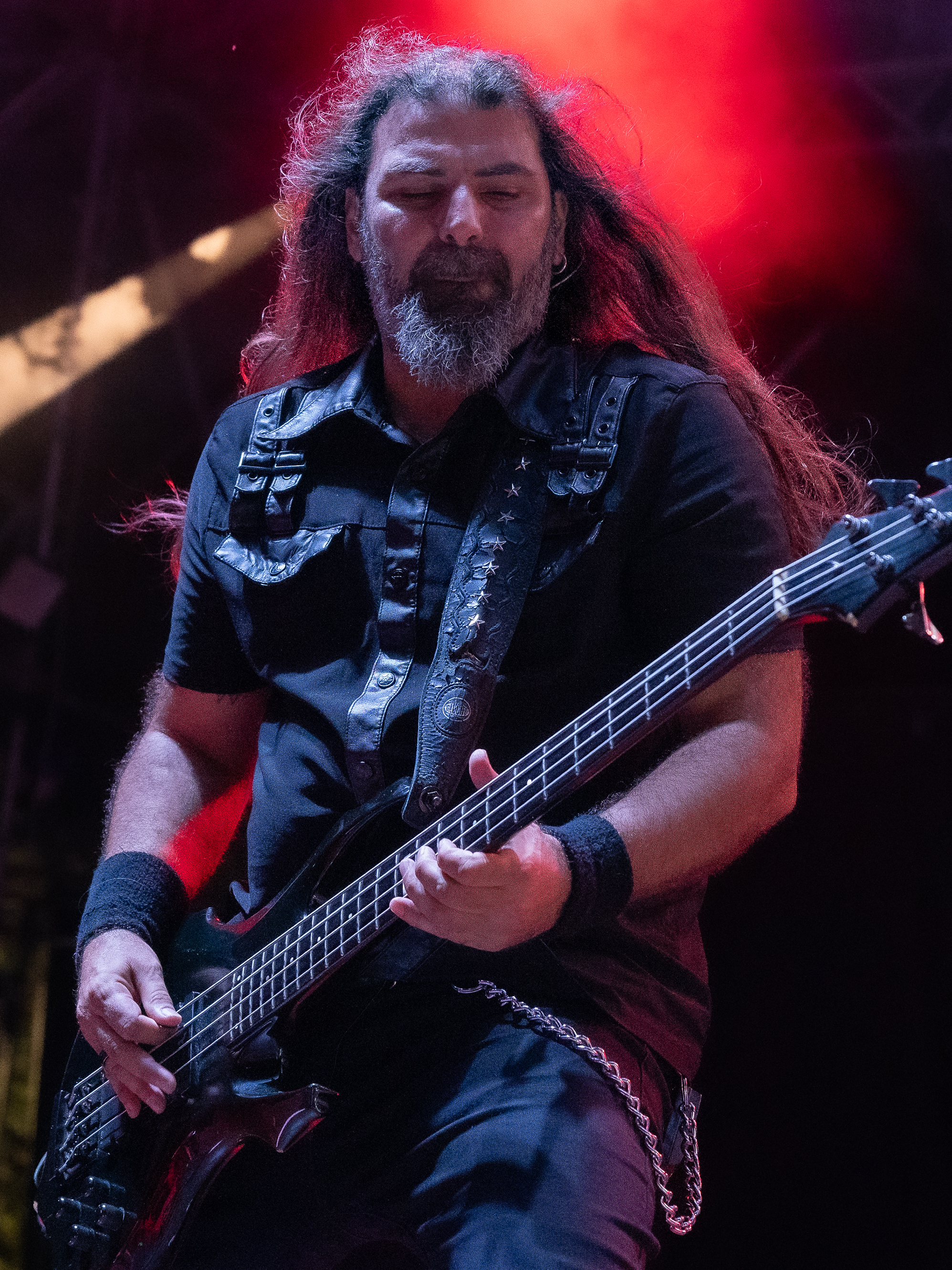
- Petros live in 2025

Background information
- Also known as: Petros Christo
- Born: Petros Christodoulidis; March 4, 1975 (age 51); Thessaloniki, Greece
- Genres: Power metal
- Occupation: Musician
- Instrument: Bass guitar
- Member of: Firewind

Petros Christodoulidis (Greek: Πέτρος Χριστοδουλίδης; born March 4, 1975) is the current bass player of the Greek power metal band Firewind. He has also played in Breaking Silence. He is the owner of The Wet Match Cafe, which was known as Emerald Cafe in the past, in his home town, Thessaloniki.
