= Teach Me =

Teach Me may refer to:

== Films ==
- Teach Me!, a short film by Mike Nichols

== Music ==
- Teach Me (Joey Badass song), single feat. Kiesza 2015
- "Teach Me" (Bakermat song), 2014
- "Teach Me" (Lee Vasi song), 2024
- "Teach Me", song by Jackie DeShannon, 1960
- "Teach Me", song by Cory Marks from This Man, 2015
- "Teach Me", song by Explosions (band) with Juanita Brooks
- "Teach Me", song by The Highway QCs, 1958
- "Teach Me", song by Lowell Fulson, 1971
