= Outlaws & Outsiders =

2019 song by Cory Marks

Single by Cory Marks featuring Ivan Moody, Travis Tritt & Mick Mars

from the album Who I Am
- B-side: "Blame It on the Double"
- Released: November 15, 2019 (Note: The track was not officially sent to radio formats as a single until March 4, 2020.)
- Genre: Country rock
- Length: 3:17
- Label: Better Noise
- Songwriter(s): Cory Marks; Kane Churko; Kevin Churko
- Producer(s): Kevin Churko

Cory Marks singles chronology
"Nowhere With You" (2016)	"Outlaws & Outsiders" (2019)	"Drive" (2020)

Travis Tritt singles chronology
"Sometimes Love Just Ain't Enough" (2013)	"Outlaws & Outsiders" (2019)	"Pick Her Up" (2020)

Music video
- "Outlaws & Outsiders" on YouTube

Music video
- "Outlaws & Outsiders (From the Sno Babies Movie)" on YouTube

"Outlaws & Outsiders" is a song co-written and recorded by Canadian country rock singer Cory Marks. Ivan Moody of Five Finger Death Punch, Travis Tritt, and Mick Mars of Mötley Crüe are featured on the track. The song was released in November 2019 through Better Noise Music and was sent to both country and rock radio formats as the lead single off Marks’ album Who I Am. A solo version by Marks was included on the soundtrack for the film Sno Babies, while both versions of the track were included on a CD-exclusive EP of the same name.

== Background ==
Marks told David McPherson of SOCAN Magazine that "Outlaws & Outsiders" started "simply a cool title" for a cross-Canada tour he did with Aaron Pritchett in 2015. Later that year, Marks co-wrote the track with Kevin Churko. McPherson remarked that "Canadian country radio is where [Marks] would love to land, but like the song’s title, he’s an outlier. His sound isn’t poppy enough to fit the mainstream mold." Marks said "I feel like I’m a country artist, first and foremost, I want to give country radio something different for the fans and for the genre."

== Critical reception ==
Hendrik Pape of Sound Check Entertainment called the song a "powerhouse country/rock crossover" and "one of the greatest songs of 2019". Front Porch Music referred to the song as a "heavy hit", while Dave Brooks of Billboard called it "hard-charging" with "an arena anthem hook and a throwback sound mixing metal and southern rock with a countrified sound palate". Billboard dubbed it the "hit that couldn't be confined".

== Commercial performance ==
"Outlaws & Outsiders" debuted atop the Rock Digital and Hard Rock Digital Song Sales charts and at #7 on Country Digital Songs. It later reached a peak of #10 on US Mainstream Rock, and #12 on Canada Rock radio. It has been certified Platinum by Music Canada. As of September 2023, the song had received over 60 million streams through Spotify.

== Music video ==
The official music video for the track was released in November 2019, and features Marks along with Moody, Tritt, and Mars each recording their parts. A second video for the solo version was released in May 2020 in support of the song's appearance in the film "Sno Babies" and integrates footage from the film.

== Track listings ==
Digital download - single

1. "Outlaws & Outsiders" – 3:17
  (feat. Ivan Moody, Travis Tritt & Mick Mars)

7-inch vinyl - single

1. "Outlaws & Outsiders" – 3:17
  (feat. Ivan Moody, Travis Tritt & Mick Mars)
2. "Blame It on the Double" – 3:27

CD - EP

1. "Outlaws & Outsiders" – 3:17
  (feat. Ivan Moody, Travis Tritt & Mick Mars)
2. "Better Off" – 3:17
3. "Blame It on the Double" – 3:27
4. "My Whiskey Your Wine" – 3:16
5. "Outlaws & Outsiders" – 3:28

== Chart performance ==
Chart (2019–20)	Peak position
Australia Country Hot 50 (The Music)	41
Canada Digital Songs (Billboard)	11
Canada Rock (Billboard)	12
US Country Digital Songs (Billboard)	7
US Digital Songs (Billboard)	26
US Hot Hard Rock Songs (Billboard)	7
US Hot Rock & Alternative Songs (Billboard)	14
US Mainstream Rock (Billboard)	10
US Rock & Alternative Airplay (Billboard)	33

=== Year-end charts ===
Chart (2020)	Position
US Hard Rock Digital Songs (Billboard)	19
US Mainstream Rock (Billboard)	49
US Rock Digital Songs (Billboard)	18

== Certifications ==
Region	Certification	Certified units/sales
Canada (Music Canada)	Platinum	80,000^{‡}
^{‡} Sales+streaming figures based on certification alone.
