= Somewhere New =

Somewhere New may refer to:

- Somewhere New, a 2012 extended play (EP) by 5 Seconds of Summer
- A 2016 song by Klingande, featuring M-22
