= Tropical house =

Subgenre of house music

- Other names: Trop house; melodic house
- Stylistic origins: Deep house; Balearic beat; dancehall; electropop; tropical music; reggae fusion
- Cultural origins: 2010s, Northwestern Europe
- Typical instruments: Synthesizers; piano; steel drums; flute; marimba

Tropical house, also known as trop house, is a subgenre of house music, and a derivation of tropical music, with elements of dancehall and Balearic house. Artists of the genre are often featured at various summer festivals such as Tomorrowland. The genre was popularized by artists including Kygo, Thomas Jack, Klangkarussell, Klingande, Robin Schulz, Bakermat, Matoma, Lost Frequencies, Felix Jaehn, Seeb and Gryffin. Tropical house hits include Kygo's "Firestone", Klingande's "Jubel", Felix Jaehn's remix of "Cheerleader", Robin Schulz's remixes of "Waves" and "Prayer in C", and Lost Frequencies's remix of "Are You With Me".

The term "Tropical House" began as a joke by Australian producer Thomas Jack, but has since gone on to gain popularity among listeners. The term "trouse" should not be confused with tropical house, as "trouse" is a genre that instead combines the feeling of trance and the beats of progressive house, using electro synths.

== Characteristics ==
Tropical house is a derivation of deep house music characterized by its relaxed and island-inspired melodies, which give off a "Caribbean, beach-party vibe.” Like deep house, it features synthesized instrumentation and a four-on-the-floor beat at a tempo of 100 to 120 bpm, slower than average electronic music. The subgenre distinguishes itself through its use of airy synths, melodic rhythms, and tropical instruments, such as steel percussions, trumpets, saxophones, flutes, marimbas, or bongos. Tropical house does not rely heavily on the build-ups and drops seen in EDM, instead featuring calming melodies and soft vocals that are easy to listen to in any setting. It aims to create a laid-back atmosphere evoking the paradisical imagery of an island holiday, typically associated with the tropics. Producers frequently follow up the vocal delivery of the hook with an instrumental break highlighting the melody. Lyrically, songs often talk about happiness, love, relationships, break-ups, and sadness.

While EDM mainly happens in clubs, tropical house is more associated with online platforms and outdoor festivals, beach parties, and boat raves. Successful producers typically break through on SoundCloud or YouTube, where their remixes of mainstream tracks in the tropical style can gather tens of millions of views before they are signed to a commercial label and start producing original singles in the genre.

== History ==
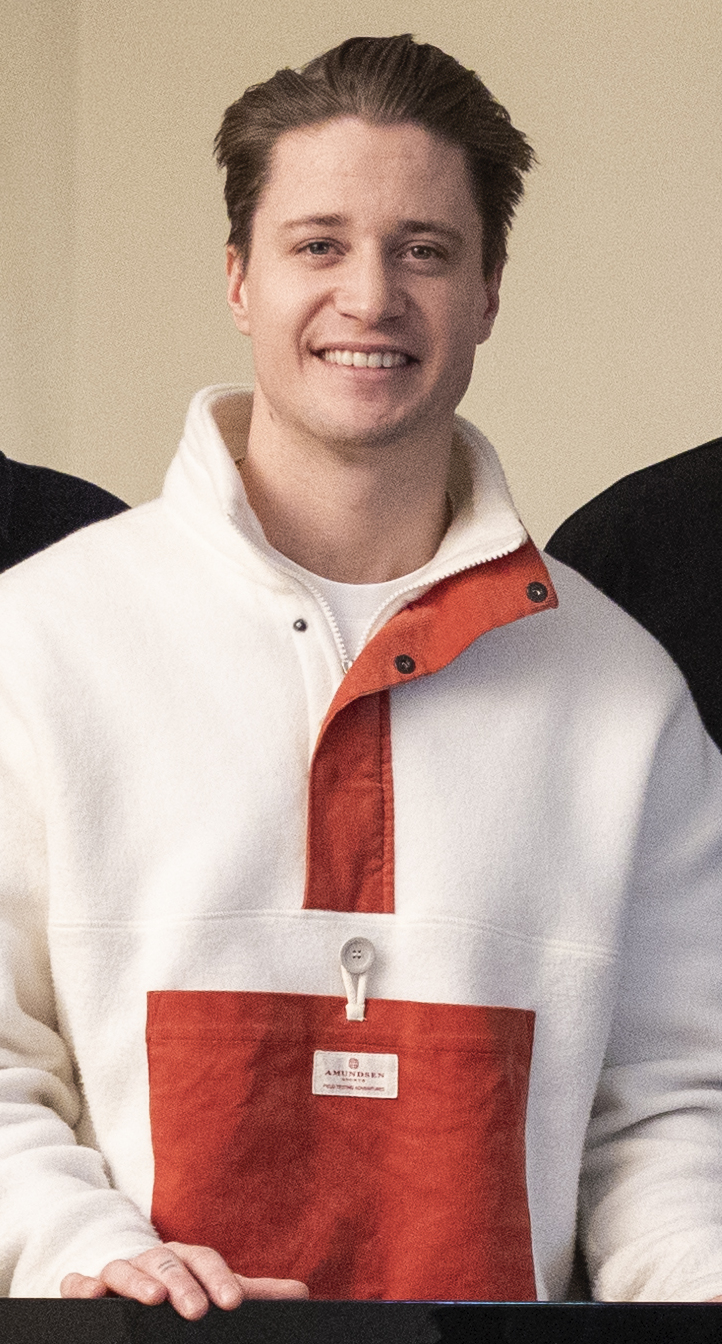
Kygo (pictured in 2024) is the most successful tropical house artist

In the mid and late 2000s, Bob Sinclar and Yves Larock created international hits which had many characteristics of tropical house, drawing inspiration from 1980's Hi-NRG music and in contrast with other sub-types of Electronic ("EDM") music of the time. The style was further popularized by "Stereo Love", an international hit by Edward Maya, a music producer from the Romanian house scene. In 2012, Unicorn Kid created tropical rave, a faster form of the genre which would become known as tropical house. However, it was not until 2013 with Klangkarussell's "Sun Don't Shine" and the emergence of producers such as Kygo and Robin Schulz that tropical house became a dance music trend. During 2014 and 2015, producers such as Lost Frequencies, Felix Jaehn, Alex Adair, Sam Feldt, Bakermat, Klingande, Jonas Blue and Faul & Wad Ad would join them with big tropical house hits. During the mid-2010s, certain tropical house producers would team up with artists such as Justin Bieber and Little Mix. This helped the genre achieve massive commercial success and gave rise to the playlist term of 'tropical pop', this success best articulated through the tropical pop hit "Shape of You" by Ed Sheeran, which to this day is the second highest streamed song on Spotify.

== See also ==
- Category:Tropical house musicians
- Category:Tropical house songs
- List of electronic music genres
- Styles of house music
- Future house
- Balearic trance
