= Riva =

Riva may refer to:

== People ==
- Riva (surname)
- Riva Castleman (1930–2014), American art historian, art curator and author
- Riva Ganguly Das (born 1961), Indian diplomat
- Riva (footballer), Brazilian former footballer Rivadávio Alves Pereira (born 1944)
- Riva Taylor, professional name of English singer/songwriter Rebecca Jane Grosvenor-Taylor
- A diminutive of Rebecca (given name)
- Rabbi Isaac ben Asher ha-Levi an 11th century German Tosafist

== Places ==
- Riva, Istanbul, a village in Istanbul Province, Turkey
- Riva, Maryland, a census-designated place in the United States
- Riva del Garda, a town and comune in northern Italy

== In music ==
- Riva Records, a record label
- Riva (band), a former Croatian band
- An alternative name used by Dutch producing duo Zki & Dobre
- "Riva (Restart the Game)", a 2015 song by Klingande featuring Broken Back

== In business ==
- Riva Spa, an Italian yachtbuilding company, part of the Ferretti Group as of 2000
- Gruppo Riva, an Italian steel company
- Lada Riva, an automobile
- Riva Fashion, a fashion brand in the Middle East
- Riva Verlag, a German book publisher

== Other uses ==
- RIVA, a line of graphics cards made by Nvidia Corporation
- Riva Ridge, winner of the 1972 Kentucky Derby and Belmont Stakes, stablemate to Triple Crown winner Secretariat
- Riva (Star Trek), a deaf and mute fictional character in Star Trek
- "riva", a Croatian term for "riviera"
