= Lee Vasi =

American gospel and R&B singer

- Born: Halle Sullivan-Vargas; July 29, 1997 (age 29); Fayetteville, North Carolina, U.S.
- Origin: Atlanta, Georgia
- Genres: Gospel, R&B
- Occupations: Singer; songwriter; musician
- Years active: 2018–present
- Labels: Capitol Christian Music Group, TAMLA Records

Halle Sullivan-Vargas better known by her stage name Lee Vasi, is an American gospel and R&B singer and songwriter. Vasi was a contestant on American Idol during season 16, where she made it to the Hollywood rounds.

Following the success of independent viral singles "My Bad" and "Teach Me", Vasi was signed to Capitol Christian Music Group and Tamla Records in 2025. Her debut album, Love Me To Life, arrived May 30, 2025, and placed on Billboards Top Gospel Albums chart.

== Early life ==
Lee Vasi was born Halle Sullivan-Vargas on July 29, 1997, in Fayetteville, North Carolina. She was raised in a multicultural, Puerto Rican-Dominican and African American household where she was encouraged to engage in music from a young age.

== Career ==
=== Early years—2018 ===
Lee Vasi enjoyed music from an early age, often singing with her brother. She started musical theater when she was 7 and by the age of 9, she had been cast as young Nala on the Broadway musical, The Lion King. During her time on Broadway, Vasi began songwriting and after leaving, she attended the Tisch School of the Arts at New York University to further develop her musical talents. In 2018 she appeared on season 16 of American Idol where she advanced to the Top 50 before being cut prior to the final 24.

=== 2019—2024: From Me, To God (EP) ===
Following her appearance on American Idol, Vasi moved to Atlanta, Georgia to pursue music fulltime. After several years of unsuccessfully finding her footing in the industry, the COVID-19 pandemic prompted Vasi to take a step-back from music entirely. In 2021 she retreated to her hometown Fayetteville, North Carolina, where she grew closer with her Christian faith, inspiring a new direction in her music. In 2023 she returned to Atlanta and released the single "My Bad", alongside a Spanish version. The single went viral on social media, receiving widespread reception for its modern approach to Christian R&B.

The following year, Vasi, still an independent artist, released "Teach Me" on January 12, 2024. The single achieved online viral success and became her first entry on Billboard charts; reaching No. 2 on the Billboard Gospel Digital Songs Sales chart and No. 21 on the Hot Gospel Songs chart. In the wake of the single's virality, Vasi issued her first extended play, From Me, To God, on April 26, 2024. In June 2024, Vasi was featured at the Gospel Music Association's Future Sounds Showcase; where she performed alongside Christian hip-hop artist Caleb Gordon and singer-songwriter Jervis Campbell.

=== 2025: Love Me To Life ===
After being named Amazon Music's 2025 Artist to Watch, Lee Vasi issued the single, "GPS", on January 17, 2025. A second single, "My Bad Part II" was released on March 14, 2025. Vasi released a third single, "He Is" on April 25, 2025, and announced she had signed with major labels Capitol CMG and Tamla Records which would support her subsequent releases and debut album. Her debut studio album, Love Me To Life, was recorded in a three-week span and arrived on May 30, 2025; placing on Billboards Top Gospel Albums chart.

To promote the album, Vasi opened for American R&B and worship singer Ryan Ellis on the summer leg of the Better Days Tour. On August 16, 2025, the music video for the single, "My Bad Part II", alongside Vasi's story behind the song, was featured at the 40th Stellar Awards.

=== 2026—present ===
At the 57th NAACP Image Awards on February 28, 2026, Lee Vasi received a nomination for Outstanding New Artist. Preceding the awards, Vasi announced via social media that she was entering a new era, confirming the single, "Worthy", which arrived February 27, 2026, would be her final release with Capitol CMG/TAMLA Records.

In July 2026, Vasi returned to releasing independently with the single, "Forward".

== Artistry ==
=== Influences ===
Lee Vasi grew up listening to Mariah Carey, Ne-Yo and Selena and cites her Puerto Rican-Dominican and African American household as having a large influence on the music she appreciates.

=== Musical style ===
Vasi's music has widely been received as "Christian R&B" primarily incorporating elements of soul and Latin pop with Gospel-inspired lyricism. She sings in both English and Spanish with several bilingual songs and Spanglish variations.

== Discography ==
=== Studio albums ===
Title	Album details	Peak chart positions
Title	Album details	US Gospel
Love Me To Life	Release date: May 30, 2025; Label: Capitol CMG, Tamla Records; Formats: Digital download, streaming	28

=== EPs ===
Title	Details
From Me, To God	Release date: April 26, 2024; Label: Leeda Music Group; Formats: Digital download, streaming

=== Singles ===
Year	Single	Peak chart positions			Album
Year	Single	US Gospel Air	US Hot Gospel	US Digital Gospel	Album
2023	"My Bad"	—	—	—	Non-album single
2024	"Teach Me"	47	21	2	From Me, To God (EP)
2024	"Your Will"	—	—	—	From Me, To God (EP)
2024	"Never Let Me Go"	—	—	—	Non-album single
2025	"GPS"	—	—	—	Love Me To Life
2025	"My Bad Part II"	—	—	—	Love Me To Life
2025	"He Is"	—	—	—	Love Me To Life
2026	"Worthy"	—	—	—	TBA
2026	"Forward"	153	—	—	TBA
2026	"Hallelujah"	—	—	—	TBA
"—" denotes releases that did not chart or were not released in that territory.

== Awards and nominations ==
=== NAACP Image Awards ===
Year	Category	Nominee	Result	Ref
2026	Outstanding New Artist	Herself	Nominated	
