= RIVA =

RIVA was a series of Nvidia graphics processing units. The main products of the series were:

- RIVA 128
- RIVA TNT
- RIVA TNT2

== See also ==
- Riva (disambiguation)
