= Cory Marks =

Canadian country singer (born 1989)

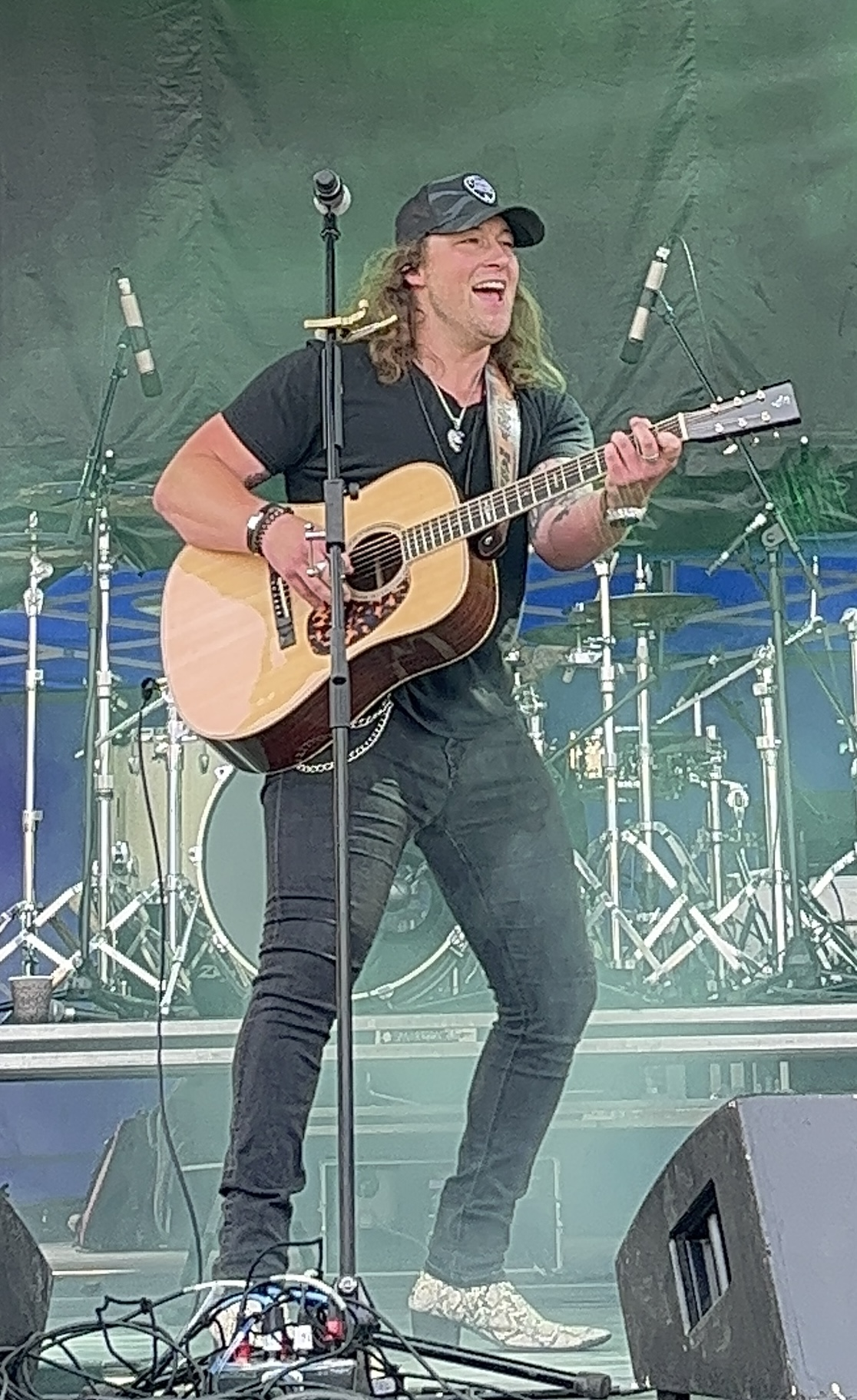
- Marks performing in Burlington, Ontario, in 2023

Background information
- Also known as: Lion Man, Sunshine
- Born: October 11, 1989 (age 36); North Bay, Ontario, Canada
- Genres: Country; country rock; outlaw country; hard rock
- Occupation: Singer-songwriter
- Instruments: Vocals, guitar, drums
- Years active: 2011–present
- Labels: Better Noise; Big Star
- Website: corymarks.com

Cory Gerald Joseph Marquardt (born October 11, 1989) is a Canadian country rock singer-songwriter better known by his stage name Cory Marks. He is signed to Better Noise Music. He has released four albums, This Man in 2015 under Big Star Recordings, then Who I Am in 2020, Sorry for Nothing in 2024, and Sorry for Nothing Vol. 2, all under Better Noise. Marks has accumulated over 450 million global streams with his debut single "Outlaws & Outsiders" being certified Platinum in Canada, Gold in the US and reaching top 10 at US rock radio and #3 in Germany, making Marks the first to ever do so as a Canadian country act. Marks' 2024 hit "(Make My) Country Rock" featuring Travis Tritt, Mick Mars formerly of Mötley Crüe and Sully Erna of Godsmack earned him his second top 20 single at US Rock radio.

== Early life ==
Marks was raised in North Bay, Ontario, the younger brother of professional hockey player Matt Marquardt, and learned how to skate at three years old. He cites Merle Haggard, Brad Paisley, Eric Church, Bryan Adams, Ozzy Osbourne, and Rush as early musical influences. Marks played university hockey at the Royal Military College of Canada where he also pursued dreams of becoming a fighter pilot. He had never performed music publicly until his friends encouraged him to do so while at a bar in college. He has performed using the name "Cory Marks" since the release of his debut album. Marks achieved his private pilot license in 2021.

== Career ==
=== 2014–2015: This Man ===
In July 2014, he released his first single to Canadian country radio, "Smartphone". His second single, "21", was released in April 2015. His first album, This Man, was released on May 26, 2015, through Big Star Recordings. The album included his first two singles, as well as two further singles, "This Man" and "Nowhere With You".

=== 2016–2021: Who I Am and extended plays ===
In 2016, Marks signed a deal to work with award-winning producer Kevin Churko, known for work with Ozzy Osbourne, Shania Twain, and Five Finger Death Punch. In 2018, he signed a record deal with Eleven Seven Music (later rebranded as Better Noise Music) as their flagship country artist.

In November 2019, Marks released his first single on Better Noise, "Outlaws & Outsiders", featuring Ivan Moody, Travis Tritt, and Mick Mars, which debuted at #1 on iTunes in Canada as well as #1 on the Billboard Rock Digital Songs and Hard Rock Digital Songs charts and #7 on the Country Digital Songs charts. The song would later peak inside the top 10 on US Mainstream Rock radio, top 5 on German rock radio, and peaked at #12 on Canada Rock radio. It was also certified Gold by Music Canada.

In June 2020, Marks released "Drive" and announced it as the second single to country radio off his second album, Who I Am, which was released on August 7, 2020, through Better Noise. In October 2020, "Blame It on the Double" was released as the second single to rock radio in Germany and the United Kingdom. Marks also released his first Christmas single "Jingle My Bells", a cover of a song by The Tractors, that month. In April 2021, Marks released a new version of "Blame It on the Double" featuring Tyler Connolly of Theory of a Deadman and Jason Hook.

On June 18, 2021, Marks released the extended play Nashville Mornings. It included a cover of Blaze Foley's "If I Could Only Fly", as well as a "Country Mix" of "Blame It on the Double" featuring Tyler Connolly, which was sent to Canadian country radio. He followed that up with the extended play Nashville Nights on August 20, 2021, which included a new track "In Me I Trust", the solo version of "Outlaws & Outsiders", and live versions of "Drive" and "Blame It on the Double".

=== 2022–present: I Rise and Sorry for Nothing albums ===
In November 2022, Marks released the extended play I Rise, which included the singles "Burn It Up" and "Flying". He supported Five Finger Death Punch on their headlining tour in the United States in the fall and winter of 2022 alongside Brantley Gilbert. In early 2024, Marks toured across Canada on Aaron Pritchett 's "Liquored Up Tour" with Matt Lang.

In June 2024, Marks released two songs, "Guilty”, which featured Bad Wolves's lead singer DL, and "Drunk When I'm High", which was serviced to Australian country radio. On December 6, 2024, Marks released his third studio album Sorry for Nothing. He released the song "(Make My) Country Rock" featuring Sully Erna, Travis Tritt, and Mick Mars, concurrently with the announcement of the album several months prior. Marks released his fourth studio album Sorry for Nothing Vol. 2 on October 3, 2025.

== Discography ==
=== Albums ===
Title	Details	Peak chart positions					
Title	Details	AUS Country	CAN	SWI	UK Country	US Heat	US Album Sales
This Man	Release date: May 26, 2015; Label: Big Star Recordings; Format: CD, digital download, streaming	—	—	—	—	—	—
Who I Am	Release date: August 7, 2020; Label: Better Noise Music; Format: CD, vinyl, digital download, streaming	16	12	98	6	17	74
Sorry for Nothing	Release date: December 6, 2024; Label: Better Noise Music; Format: CD, vinyl, digital download, streaming	—	—	—	—	—	—
Sorry for Nothing Vol. 2	Release date: October 3, 2025; Label: Better Noise Music; Format: CD, vinyl, digital download, streaming	—	—	—	—	—	—

=== Extended plays ===
Title	Details
Outlaws & Outsiders	Release date: June 2020; Label: Better Noise Music; Format: CD
Nashville Mornings	Release date: June 18, 2021; Label: Better Noise Music; Format: Digital download, streaming
Nashville Nights	Release date: August 13, 2021; Label: Better Noise Music; Format: Digital download, streaming
I Rise	Release date: November 4, 2022; Label: Better Noise Music; Format: CD, digital download, streaming

=== Singles ===
==== 2010s ====
Year	Single	Album
2014	"Smartphone"	This Man
2015	"21"	This Man
2015	"This Man"	This Man
2016	"Nowhere with You"	This Man

==== 2020s ====
Year	Single	Peak positions							Certifications	Album
Year	Single	AUS Country	CAN Rock	US Country Digital	US Hard Rock	US Hard Rock Digi.	US Main Rock	US Rock	Certifications	Album
2020	"Outlaws & Outsiders" (featuring Ivan Moody, Travis Tritt and Mick Mars)	41	12	7	7	1	10	14	MC: Platinum	Who I Am
2020	"Drive"	—	—	—	—	—	—	—		Who I Am
2020	"Blame It on the Double" (solo or featuring Tyler Connolly and Jason Hook)	—	—	—	—	—	—	—		Who I Am
2022	"Burn It Up"	—	—	—	—	—	—	—		I Rise
2023	"Snowbirds"	—	—	—	—	—	—	—		Non-album singles
2024	"A Different Kind of Year"	—	—	—	—	—	—	—		Sorry for Nothing Vol. 2
2024	"Drunk When I'm High"	34	—	—	—	—	—	—		Sorry for Nothing
2024	"(Make My) Country Rock" (featuring Sully Erna, Mick Mars and Travis Tritt)	—	—	—	14	3	19	—		Sorry for Nothing
2024	"Fast as I Can"	43	—	—	—	—	—	—		Sorry for Nothing
2025	"Guilty" (featuring DL of Bad Wolves)	—	—	—	—	—	—	—		Sorry for Nothing
2025	"Hangman"	—	—	—	—	—	—	—		Sorry for Nothing Vol. 2
2025	"Whiskey River"	—	—	—	—	—	—	—		Sorry for Nothing Vol. 2
"—" denotes releases that did not chart or were not released in that territory.

==== As Featured Artist ====
Song	Year	Peak chart positions	Album
Song	Year	US Main.	Album
"Unstoppable" (with Eva Under Fire)	2023	20	Non-album single
"Livin' My Life Like a Country Song" (with Theory of a Deadman)	2024	—	Non-album single

=== Christmas singles ===
Year	Single	Album
2020	"Jingle My Bells"	Christmas With Better Noise Music

=== Music videos ===
Year	Video	Director
2014	"Smartphone"	Manee Osman
2015	"21"	Blake McWilliam
2016	"Nowhere with You"	
2016	"Don't Count Saturday Night"	Ed Regan
2019	"Outlaws & Outsiders" (featuring Ivan Moody, Travis Tritt and Mick Mars)	
2019	"Better Off"	Blake Judd
2020	"Blame It on the Double"	
2020	"Outlaws & Outsiders" (solo)	Jaclyn Cataldi
2020	"Drive"	Ed Regan
2020	"Out In the Rain" (featuring Lzzy Hale)	Ed Regan
2021	"Blame It on the Double" (featuring Tyler Connolly and Jason Hook)	
2021	"Blame It on the Double" - Country Mix (featuring Tyler Connolly)	Ed Regan
2021	"In Me I Trust"	Travis Nesbitt
2022	"Burn It Up"	Michael Lombardi
2022	"Flying"	
2023	"I Rise"	
2024	"(Make My) Country Rock"	
2024	"Sorry For Nothing"	Michael Lombardi
2025	"Whiskey River"	Michael Lombardi

== Awards and nominations ==
Year	Association	Category	Nominated work	Result	Ref
2021	Canadian Country Music Association	Alternative Country Album of the Year	Who I Am	Nominated	
2022	Country Music Association of Ontario	Fans' Choice	—N/a	Nominated	
2022	Country Music Association of Ontario	Songwriter(s) of the Year	"Blame It on the Double" (with Kevin Churko and Kane Churko)	Nominated	
2026	Country Music Association of Ontario	Music Video of the Year	"Whiskey River"	Nominated	
