= One Day (Vandaag) =

"Vandaag"

Single by Bakermat
- Released: 28 April 2014
- Genre: Dance
- Length: 5:22 (Promo, 2012); 3:41 (CD maxi, Sony, 2014)
- Label: Délicieuse Records (2012); Sony (2014)
- Songwriter(s): Martin Luther King Jr. Lodewijk Fluttert
- Producer(s): Bakermat

Bakermat singles chronology
"Zomer" (2012)	"Vandaag" (2014)	"Uitzicht" (2013)
"Uitzicht" (2013)	"One Day (Vandaag)" (2014)	"Teach Me" (2014)

One Day (Vandaag) cover
- Alternative "One Day (Vandaag)" cover

"Vandaag" is a song by Dutch producer Bakermat. It was released in August 2012 as a single and reached the top ten in Austria, Belgium, France, and the Netherlands.

It was re-released by Sony in 2014 as "One Day (Vandaag)" becoming a hit in several European countries.

== Content ==
The song consists of an integrated sample of the "I Have a Dream" speech by Martin Luther King Jr.

== Track list ==
Promo – digital (27 August 2012)

1. "Vandaag" (5:22)
2. "Zomer" (6:47)

CD Maxi – Sony release (25 April 2014)

1. "One Day (Vandaag)" (radio edit) (3:41)
2. "One Day (Vandaag)" (original mix) (5:24)

== Charts ==
=== Weekly charts ===
Chart (2012–14)	Peak position
Austria (Ö3 Austria Top 40)	2
Belgium (Ultratop 50 Flanders)	5
Belgium (Ultratop 50 Wallonia)	2
Czech Republic (Rádio – Top 100)	5
Denmark (Tracklisten)	31
France (SNEP)	1
Germany (GfK)	4
Hungary (Editors' Choice Top 40)	38
Hungary (Single Top 40)	13
Ireland (IRMA)	64
Netherlands (Dutch Top 40)	2
Netherlands (Single Top 100)	2
Poland (Polish Airplay Top 100)	6
Poland (Dance Top 50)	15
Scotland (OCC)ERROR in "Scotland". The date format specified in "Scotland" is incorrect. Please enter the date in the YYYYMMDD or YYYY-MM-DD format.	8
Slovakia (Rádio Top 100)	6
Slovenia (SloTop50)	8
Switzerland (Schweizer Hitparade)	22
UK Singles (OCC)ERROR in "UK". The date format specified in "UK" is incorrect. Please enter the date in the YYYYMMDD or YYYY-MM-DD format.	15

=== Year-end charts ===
Chart (2013)	Position
Belgium (Ultratop Flanders)	14
Belgium (Ultratop Wallonia)	33
Netherlands (Dutch Top 40)	18
Netherlands (Single Top 100)	13
Chart (2014)	Position
Austria (Ö3 Austria Top 40)	29
Germany (Official German Charts)	21

== Certifications ==
Region	Certification	Certified units/sales
Belgium (BRMA)	Platinum	30,000^{*}
Germany (BVMI)	Platinum	300,000^{^}
Switzerland (IFPI Switzerland)	Gold	15,000^{^}
United Kingdom (BPI)	Silver	200,000^{‡}
Streaming
Sweden (GLF)	Gold	4,000,000^{†}
^{*} Sales figures based on certification alone.^{^} Shipments figures based on certification alone.^{‡} Sales+streaming figures based on certification alone.^{†} Streaming-only figures based on certification alone.
