= Bakermat =

Dutch DJ and producer (born 1991)

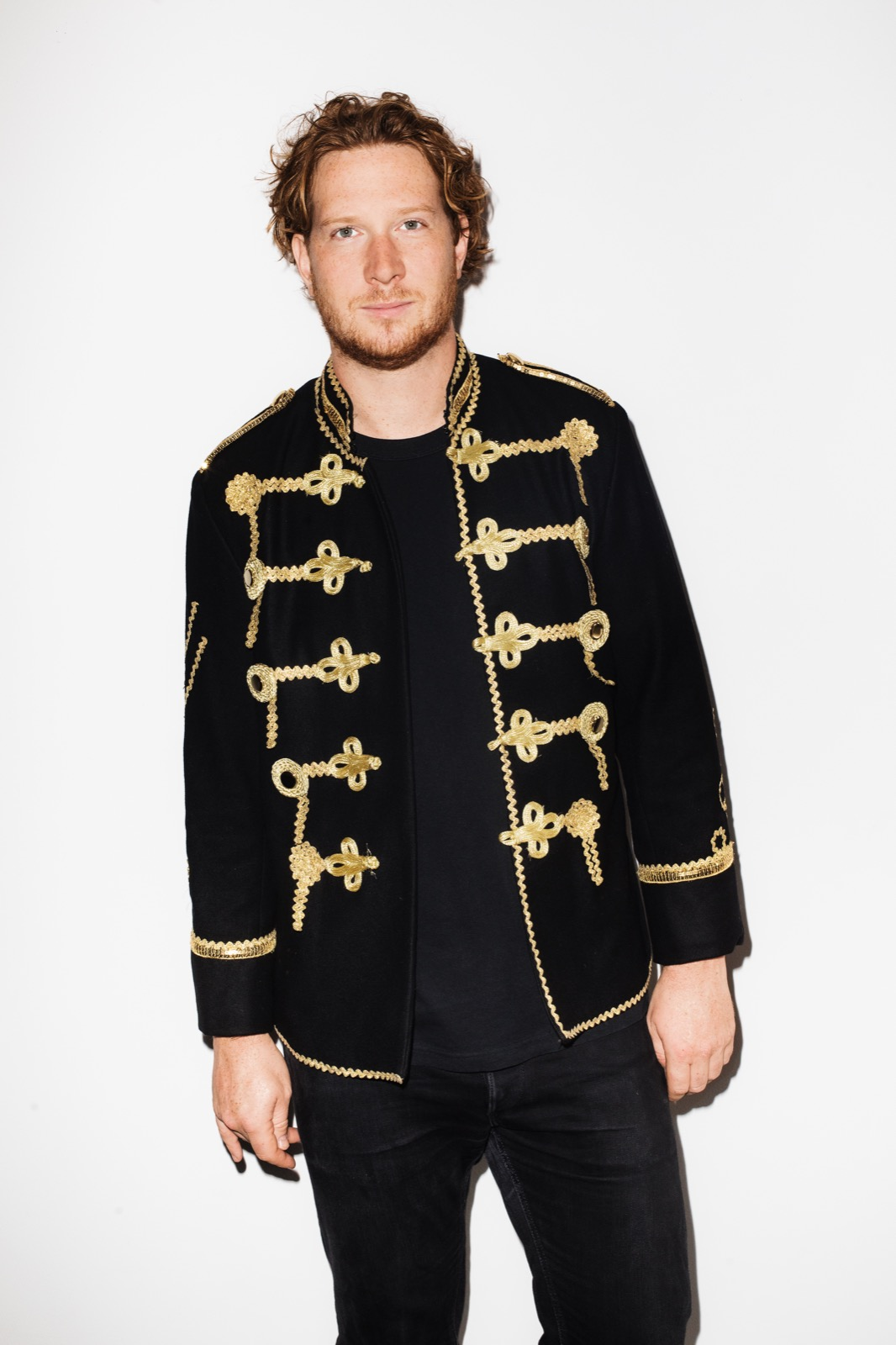

Background information
- Born: Lodewijk Fluttert; 8 October 1991 (age 34); Markelo, Netherlands
- Genre: Electronic
- Occupations: DJ, record producer
- Instrument: Keyboards
- Years active: 2012–present
- Labels: Sony Music, Ultra Music, BeYourselfMusic, Big Top Amsterdam
- Website: bakermatmusic.com

Lodewijk Fluttert (born 8 October 1991), best known by his stage name Bakermat, is a Dutch DJ and music producer. His music is characterised by a mix of dance, soul, jazz, funk, gospel, and pop.

== Career ==
=== 2012–2013: Vandaag ===
Fluttert started his musical career while studying psychology at Utrecht University and moonlighting as a DJ in his spare time. He released his first two EPs in 2012 titled "Zomer" and "Vandaag". The latter, consisting of an integrated sample of the "I Have a Dream" speech by Martin Luther King Jr., charted as a single in the Netherlands, Belgium, France and the UK between 2012 and 2013. Re-released by Sony, in December 2014 Bakermat's single "Vandaag" received a platinum record in Germany, France, The UK, The Netherlands, Austria, Belgium, Denmark and Switzerland.

In this early stage of his career, Bakermat's different approach to dance music inspired many other artists to develop their career in this style (often referred to as 'melodic house' or 'tropical house'). Artists like Klingande, Kungs, Lost Frequencies, Felix Jaehn, Sam Feldt, Thomas Jack, Kygo and many more started making music in this genre.

Bakermat often distinguishes himself in his performances compared to other DJ's by including live elements to his DJ sets. He combines his music with live artists on stage (saxophonists, singers, violinists and percussionists). In 2014, he gathered 6 musicians and formed the ‘Bakermat Live Band’, which was the foundation of his live band tour.

=== 2014–2015: Bakermat Live Band ===
In 2014 Bakermat confirmed that he would perform at the 2014 edition of Tomorrowland. That gave birth to the first stage host of Bakermat & Friends at Tomorrowland, and laid the foundation for further editions growing in to 2015 and 2016.

In collaboration with Live Nation, Bakermat began his first tour with the Bakermat Live Band. Starting in Paris, he sold out the Olympia concert hall in 3 weeks. Following Olympia, Bakermat went on to sell out his Europe Tour, which included a night at London's Brixton Academy.

After the summer he made an official remix for Labrinth's single "Jealous" and later that year released the single, "Teach Me", on the Dirty Soul Music division of Be Yourself Music. "Teach Me" was influenced by gospel, soul, blues and jazz in combination with samples of the American gospel singer, Shirley Caesar. Legendary house DJ MK also made a release of the single.

=== 2015–2016: Bakermat's Circus ===
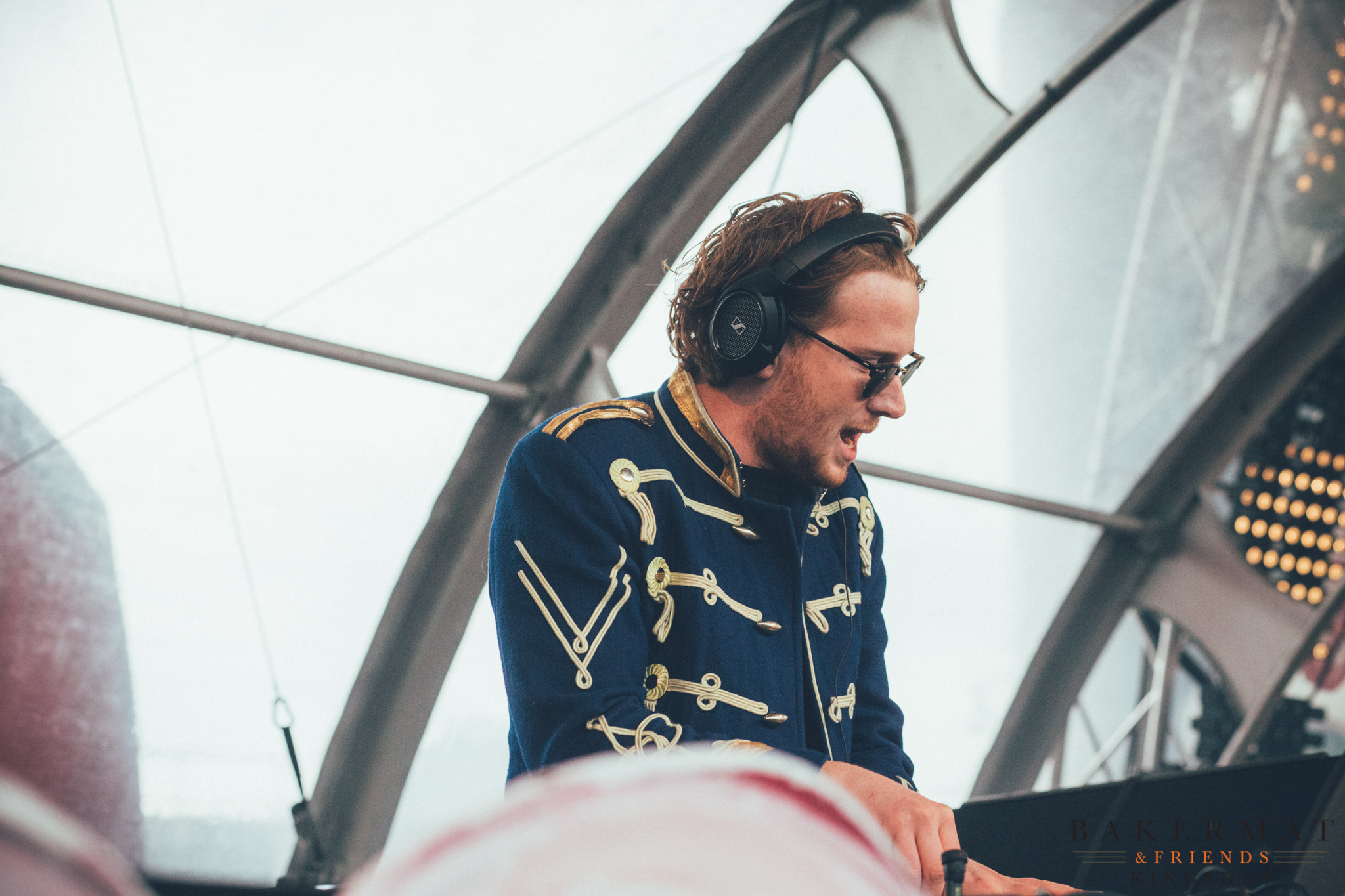
Koningsdag special

Starting in 2015, Bakermat created a new platform for artists, the audience and himself called Bakermat's Circus. His idea behind it was "to create a night where artists could push themselves musically and the audience would be carried away music, event and ambience wise". He started the trail for the shows at his residency venue in Paris, the Zig Zag Club. Soon after he travelled to London, performing two sold-out shows in a row at Electric Brixton. Since then Bakermat's Circus has travelled to London, New York City, Amsterdam, Ibiza, Paris, Rio de Janeiro, São Paulo, Malta and hosted stages at festivals like Tomorrowland and Airbeat One. Bakermat also organises his own ‘Circus’ festivals in Amsterdam. Notable guests at the shows have included Oliver Heldens, Robin Schulz, Don Diablo, Klingande, Kungs, Sam Feldt, Tube & Berger and many more.

Soon after this his monthly radio show Bakermat's Circus debuted. The series was aired on over 75 radio stations worldwide from SiriusXM to Radio538 and Revolution FM.

Former head of ID&T Duncan Stutterheim said of Bakermat on Radio538's Dance Department: "Bakermat was one of the few artists that brought something spectacular and refreshing to the stage, and he was also one of the few that didn't just press play during a performance." This led to the invitation for Bakermat to play at Stutterheim's Sensation event.

=== 2016: "Living" ===
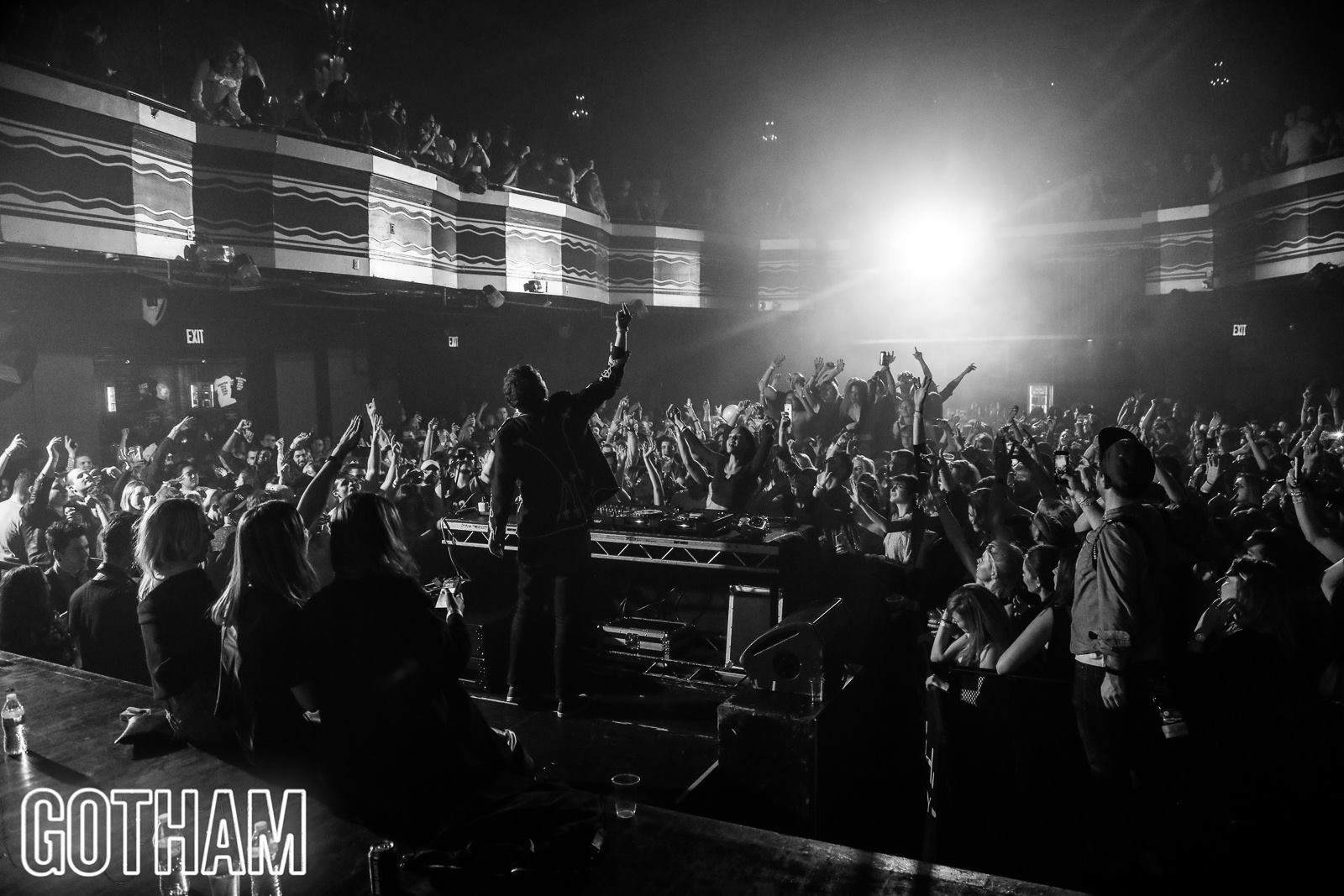
Webster Hall 2016

Early in 2016, Bakermat released his Games EP and one its featured tracks, "Games Continued", officially became Corona's Sunsets anthem for 2016. To celebrate this, Bakermat performed at a rooftop event in London, streamed live via Mixmag alongside support acts including Busy P, Sinéad Harnett and Mr. M.

In addition to Games, Bakermat released another EP, titled Ballade, which incorporated influences from classical and pop music. Later in the year, Bakermat issued the track "Living" (feat. Alex Clare), which was featured in a number of commercials including Suzuki.

In October 2016, Bakermat founded the Dutch record label Big Top Amsterdam during the Amsterdam Dance Event together with his business partner/music manager Bob van Wees.

=== 2017: Baby ===
In 2017, Bakermat debuted his live band Pukkelpop. A 7-piece band led by the ringmaster took over the live stage where they played for over 8,000 people. While touring, Bakermat released his hit "Baby", which samples Thelma Houston's 1977 hit "Don't Leave Me This Way". The track charted in France, Belgium and Switzerland.

=== 2018: Matt Baker ===
Together with Peggy Gou, Bakermat was chosen to be the global brand ambassador for the new Porsche Macan 2. During a period of 3 days the two artists shot a commercial in Berlin introducing the new Porsche to the international market.

During the Autumn of 2018 the Circus moved to São Paulo where the first full edition of Bakermat's Circus São Paulo took place. Over 4,000 people were introduced to the Circus.

After the successful debut of the summer before at Pukkelpop, the fall of 2018 was dedicated to bringing the live band show to the clubs. Bakermat returned with the 7-piece band to Paris where a sold-out Elysees Montmartre was the stage for the night.

In 2018, Bakermat released his hit "Partystarter", featured in a number of commercials including Samsung Galaxy Q4B4 Commercial, Amazon Corporate Video and Mc Fit January Campaign.

In the same year, Bakermat introduced a new character in his music narrative "Matt Baker", his canine alter ego whose adventures feature in Bakermat's music videos from that year onwards.

=== 2019: Baianá ===
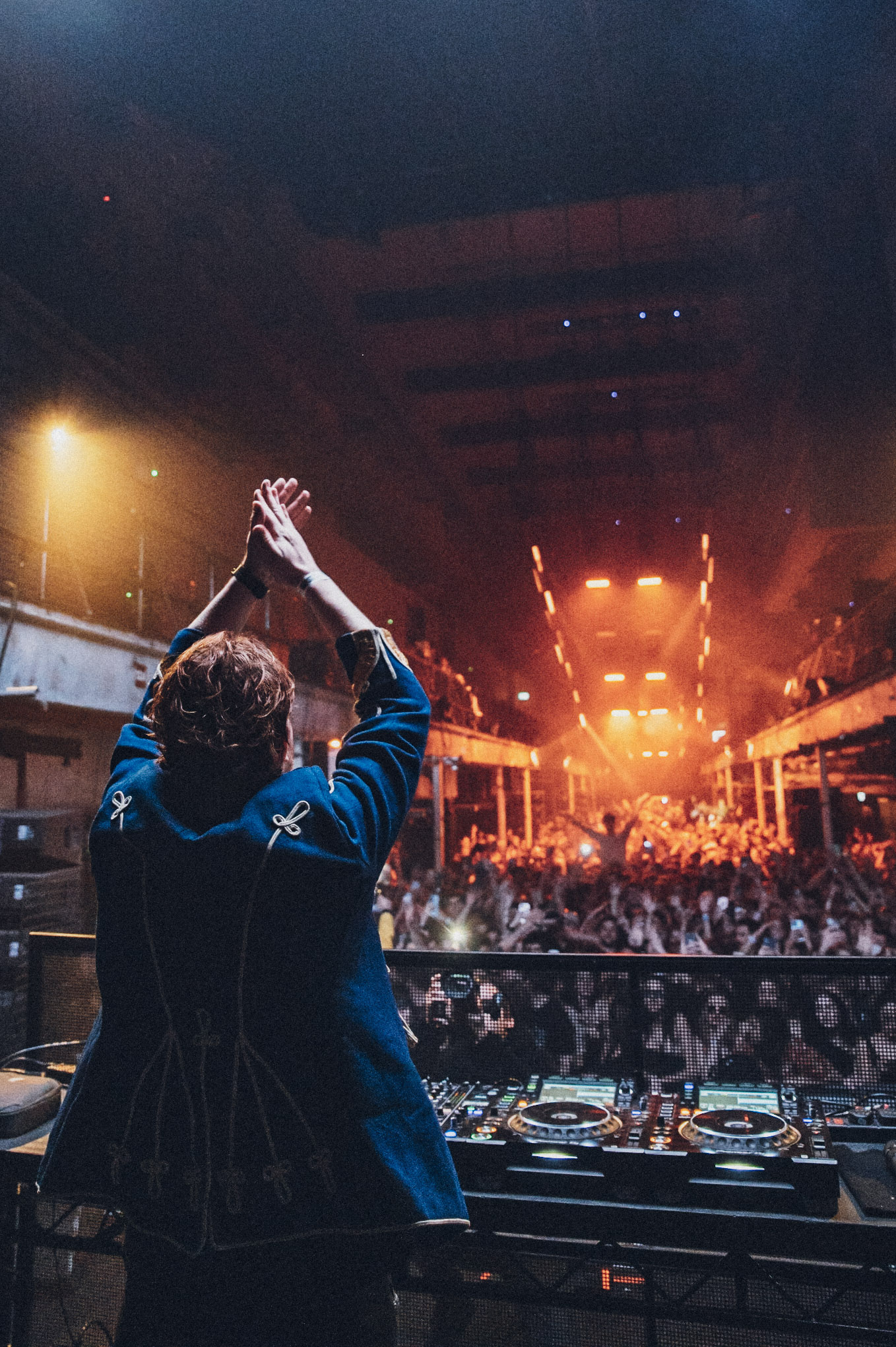
Bakermat at Printworks

The relationship with London's venue Printworks started in 2019. Bakermat moved his live band show to the live-stage at Printworks. This edition where 4,500 people saw the live band show laid the fundament for the partnership Bakermat had until 2023 with Printworks.

After debuting Bakermat's Circus in São Paulo the year before, he returned to Brazil with the Circus for more than 10,000 people divided over two cities. Both São Paulo and Rio de Janeiro turned into a proper Bakermat-event where an actual Circustent was built to host the nights.

During the summer of 2019 Bakermat announced his residency at Marseille's top venue R2 Rooftop. During a period of 6 months Bakermat was one of the monthly returning international artists that had the honour for a residency.

In 2019, Bakermat released his hit "Baianá", sampling the track by Barbatuques and Maria do Carmo Barbosa in Brazil (which itself is an adaptation of the traditional song "Boa Tarde Povo" by Maria do Carmo). The track reached the SNEP No. 38 top single of the year 2020 in France and it was certified diamond in France and platinum and gold in other countries including Benelux. The hit was selected as one of the official soundtracks of the FIFA21 football game and it was featured in the motion-based dance video game, Just Dance.

=== 2020–2021: The Ringmaster and The Spirit ===
On 9 October 2020, Bakermat released his first album, The Ringmaster, a ten-track project featuring new tracks as well as previously released songs including "Partystarter", "Trouble", "Learn to Lose" and "Baianá".

One year later, on 25 June 2021, the ringmaster released his second album, The Spirit, a twelve-track project including the gospel-house single "Ain't Nobody" featuring LaShun Pace and "Walk That Walk" featuring Nic Hanson.

At the end of 2021 Bakermat celebrated his return on stage after COVID-19 in London, at Brixton Electric. The night sold out instantly and during this night he announced his return to Printworks.

=== 2022: Big Top Amsterdam ===
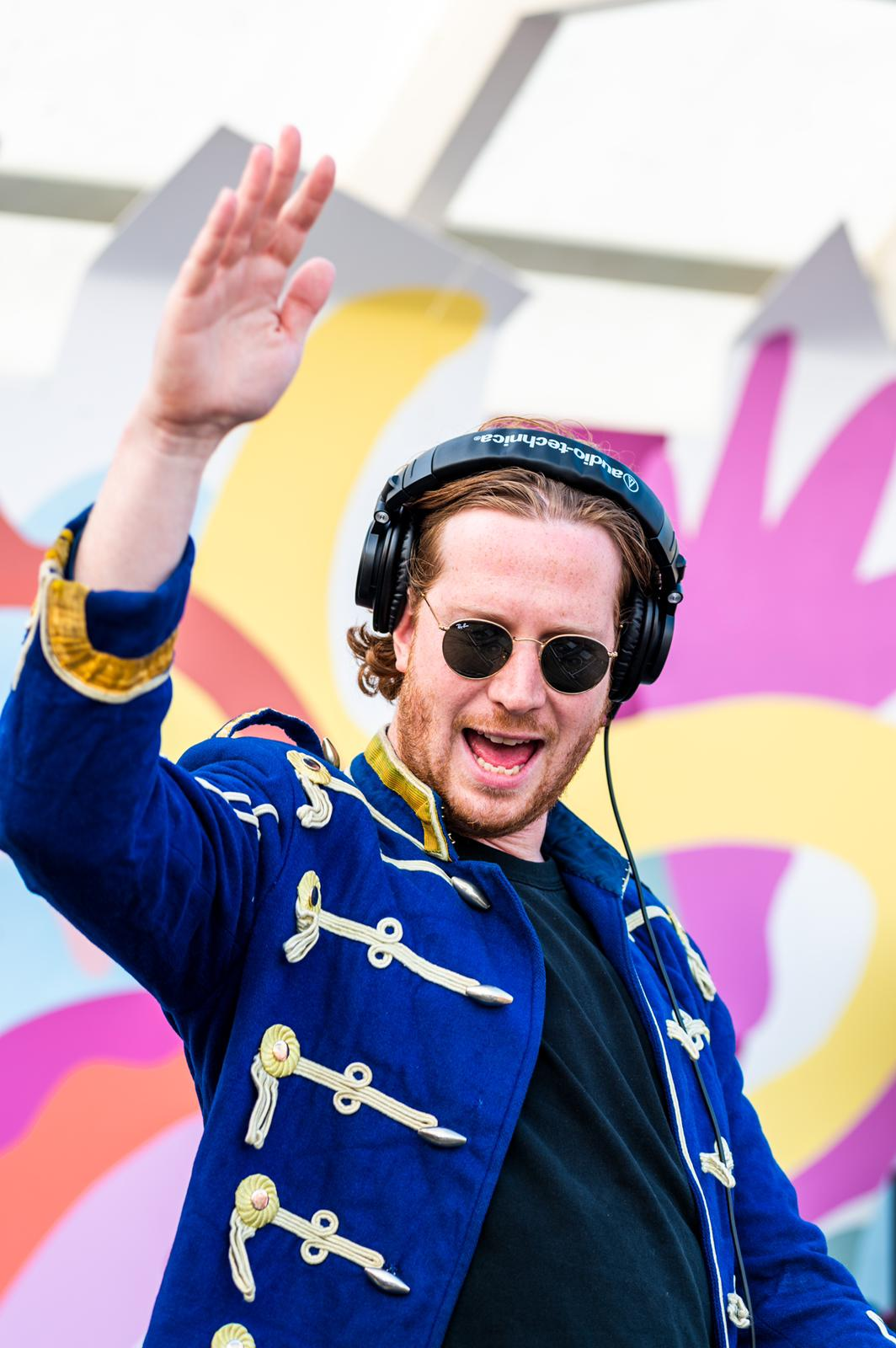
The Williamsburg Rooftop 2022

In 2022, Bakermat officially signed with his own record label Big Top Amsterdam, founded by the producer a few years before with his business partner and music manager Bob van Wees. Bakermat's first release on Big Top Amsterdam was "Temptation" (featuring Elise LeGrow), released on the occasion of his 10-year career anniversary. It was broadcast in many countries like France, Italy, Germany, the Netherlands and Belgium.

March 2022 also marked the end of the adventures of "Matt Baker", Bakermat's canine alter ego.

During February 2022 Bakermat took his concept 'Bakermat's Circus' a step further. He took over the Press Hall at Printworks for a 12 hrs day-edition of the Circus. Joined on his podium by other artists like DJ Regard, Tube&Berger among others this day's event was joined by 5,000 people.

After a two-year absence the famous Techno Parade came back to Paris in 2022. Over 20 trucks with different music genres formed the centre of the parade that went through the streets of Paris. Bakermat was invited by the French radio station Fun Radio to perform on their truck.

While touring, his second release on Big Top Amsterdam "Madan (King)" was released, sampling Salif Keita ‘Madan’. For the launch of the new FIFA23 football video game, the song was chosen as one of the official soundtracks.

=== 2023: New music ===
Starting from January 2023, based on Bakermat social media, the ringmaster has been busy with studio sessions, focusing on production along with writers and producers.

On 24 March 2023, Bakermat released the single "Good Feeling" featuring indie artist Rhys Lewis.

== Discography ==
=== Studio albums ===
Year	Title	Album details
2020	The Ringmaster	Released: 9 October 2020; Labels: Sony Music; Formats: CD, digital download, streaming
2021	The Spirit	Released: 25 June 2021; Formats: Digital download, streaming
2025	Grace Note	Released: 7 February 2025; Formats: Digital download, streaming, CD

=== Singles ===
Year	Title	Peak chart positions									Certifications	Album
Year	Title	NL	AUT	BEL	DEN	FRA	GER	SWE Heat.	SWI	UK	Certifications	Album
2012	"Zomer"	21	—	30	—	60	—	—	—	—		Non-album singles
2013	"One Day (Vandaag)"^{[A]}	2	2	2	31	1	4	—	22	15	BPI: Silver; BRMA: Platinum; BVMI: Platinum; GLF: Gold; IFPI SWI: Gold	Non-album singles
2013	"Uitzicht"	51	—	56	—	86	—	—	—	—		Non-album singles
2014	"Teach Me"	53	45	25	—	167	42	—	66	22	NVPI: Platinum; BPI: Silver	Non-album singles
2015	"Remix for Hurts "Lights""	—	—	—	—	—	—	—	—	—		Non-album singles
2015	"Remix for Foxes "Body Talk""	—	—	—	—	—	—	—	—	—		Non-album singles
2016	"Games"	—	—	76	—	—	—	—	—	—		Non-album singles
2016	"Games Continue" (with GoldFish featuring Marie Plassard)	—	—	—	—	—	—	—	—	—		Non-album singles
2016	"Ballade / Gone"	—	—	—	—	—	—	—	—	—		Non-album singles
2016	"Living" (featuring Alex Clare)	—	—	74	—	72	—	15	—	—	NVPI: Gold; GLF: Gold; SNEP: Gold	Non-album singles
2016	"Dreamreacher"	—	—	—	—	—	—	—	—	—		Non-album singles
2016	Remix of Melody Gardot's "Same To You"	—	—	—	—	—	—	—	—	—		Non-album singles
2017	"Baby"	—	—	89	—	61	—	—	99	—	BPI: Silver; SNEP: Gold	Non-album singles
2017	"Don't Want You Back" (featuring Kiesza)	—	—	86	—	—	—	—	—	—		Non-album singles
2018	"Do Your Thing / Lion EP"	—	—	—	—	—	—	—	—	—		Non-album singles
2018	"Partystarter"	—	—	—	—	—	—	—	—	—		Non-album singles
2018	Remix of George Ezra "Paradise"	—	—	—	—	—	—	—	—	—		The Ringmaster
2019	"Trouble" (featuring Albert Gold)	—	—	—	—	—	—	—	—	—		The Ringmaster
2019	"Learn to Lose" (featuring Alex Clare)	—	—	—	—	—	—	—	—	—		The Ringmaster
2019	"Baianá"	—	—	51	—	24	—	—	59	—	NVPI: Platinum; BPI: Silver; BRMA: Platinum; BVMI: Gold; IFPI AUT: Gold; IFPI SWI: Platinum; SNEP: Diamond	The Ringmaster
2020	"Under the Sun" (featuring Kidda)	—	—	—	—	—	—	—	—	—		The Ringmaster
2020	Remix for Caravan Palace "Moonshine"	—	—	—	—	—	—	—	—	—		Non-album singles
2021	Remix for Kronan's "Gatluak"	—	—	—	—	—	—	—	—	—		Non-album singles
2021	"Walk That Walk" (featuring Nic Hanson)	—	—	—	—	—	—	—	—	—		The Spirit
2021	"Ain't Nobody" (featuring LaShun Pace)	—	—	—	—	—	—	—	—	—		The Spirit
2022	"Temptation" (featuring Elise LeGrow)	—	—	—	—	—	—	—	—	—		Non-album singles
2022	"Madan (King)"	—	—	—	—	—	—	—	—	—		Non-album singles
2022	"Joy" (with Ann Nesby)	—	—	—	—	—	—	—	—	—		Non-album singles
2022	"Work It Out"	—	—	—	—	—	—	—	—	—		Non-album singles
2023	"Good Feeling" (featuring Rhys Lewis)	—	—	—	—	—	—	—	—	—		Non-album singles
"—" denotes a single that did not chart or was not released in that territory.
