= Son of David (song) =

2022 song by Ryan Ellis

Song by Ryan Ellis featuring Brandon Lake

from the album Ryan Ellis
- Released: July 15, 2022
- Genre: Contemporary worship music
- Length: 3:09
- Label: Provident Label Group
- Songwriters: Brandon Lake; Joshua Silverberg; Ryan Ellis; Tedd Tjornhom
- Producers: Joshua Silverberg; Tedd Tjornhom

Music video
- "Son of David" (Lyrics) on YouTube

"Son of David" is a song performed by American contemporary worship musician Ryan Ellis featuring Brandon Lake. It was released as the seventh track on Ellis' third studio album, Ryan Ellis, on July 15, 2022. Ellis co-wrote the song with Brandon Lake, Joshua Silverberg, and Tedd Tjornhom. Tedd Tjornhom and Joshua Silverberg produced the song.

"Son of David" peaked at No. 18 on the US Hot Christian Songs chart.

== Composition ==
"Son of David" is composed in the key of E minor with a tempo of 79 beats per minute and a musical time signature of 4/4.

== Critical reception ==
Katie Clinebell of Air1 said the song "infuses the rocking sound that it creates with a unique sense of purpose and drive, evoking a feeling of perseverance and strength. This song provides a worship anthem for when you need to push through a difficult situation and lean on God's mercy to get through it."

== Commercial performance ==
"Son of David" made its debut at number 46 on the US Christian Airplay chart dated November 12, 2022.

"Son of David" debuted at number 49 on the US Hot Christian Songs chart dated December 10, 2022,

== Music video ==
Ryan Ellis released the official lyric video of "Son of David" featuring Brandon Lake through his YouTube channel on July 15, 2022.

== Charts ==
=== Weekly charts ===
Weekly chart performance for "Son of David"
Chart (2022–2023)	Peak position
US Christian Songs (Billboard)	18
US Christian Airplay (Billboard)	37

=== Year-end charts ===
Year-end chart performance for "Son of David"
Chart (2023)	Position
US Christian Songs (Billboard)	82
