= Jubel (song) =

2013 single by Klingande

Single by Klingande
- Released: 5 April 2013
- Genre: Tropical house; deep house
- Length: 4:44 (original mix); 3:19 (radio edit); 2:28 (UK radio edit)
- Songwriters: Cédric Steinmyller; Edgar Catry
- Producer: Klingande

Klingande singles chronology
"Punga" (2013)	"Jubel" (2013)	"Riva (Restart the Game)" (2015)

"Jubel" (Germanic languages: "cheers", "jubilance") is a song by French duo Klingande. It features uncredited vocals by French singer Lucie Decarne and saxophone by British musician Snake Davis. It was published on SoundCloud and YouTube on 16 March 2013 and first released commercially on 5 April 2013, and went on to top the charts in numerous European countries across 2013 and 2014.

== Commercial performance ==
The song first charted in France, where it debuted at number 117 in April 2013, eventually peaking at number five in March 2014. It first reached number one in Germany in October 2013, spending seven weeks on top, and reached number one in Austria and Switzerland in November 2013. It further topped the charts in Italy and the Flanders region of Belgium in January 2014, as well as the airplay charts of Poland, Slovakia and the Czech Republic later in 2014. On the UK Singles Chart, it debuted and peaked at number three in June 2014, and it also reached number three in Australia in August 2014.

== Music video ==
The music video was released on the duo's YouTube channel on 17 September 2013, and on the Kontor Records channel three days later. It was directed by Michael Johansson and Johan Rosell, and was filmed on the Danish island of Møn, as well as in the Swedish city of Malmö. Johansson explained that the location of Møn was chosen by searching for "the most beautiful place in Denmark", as a short deadline prevented the Swedish director's initial plans of filming in the south of France or Croatia. The video was originally intended to have a storyline, but had to be shortened to fit the radio edit of the song, so they instead chose to just "[capture] the mood of the track". As of March 2023, the video has over 210 million views on YouTube.

== Charts ==
=== Weekly charts ===
Chart (2013–2014)	Peak position
Australia (ARIA)	3
Austria (Ö3 Austria Top 40)	1
Belgium (Ultratop 50 Flanders)	1
Belgium (Ultratop 50 Wallonia)	2
Czech Republic (Rádio – Top 100)	1
Czech Republic (Singles Digitál Top 100)	49
Denmark (Tracklisten)	8
Finland (Suomen virallinen lista)	5
France (SNEP)	5
Germany (GfK)	1
Hungary (Rádiós Top 40)	24
Hungary (Single Top 40)	4
Ireland (IRMA)	3
Italy (FIMI)	1
Luxembourg Digital Songs (Billboard)	1
Mexico Anglo (Monitor Latino)	14
Netherlands (Dutch Top 40)	9
Netherlands (Single Top 100)	9
Norway (VG-lista)	2
Poland Airplay (ZPAV)	1
Poland Dance (ZPAV)	11
Portugal Digital Songs (Billboard)	1
Romania (Airplay 100)	8
Scottish Singles Sales (Official Charts)	3
Slovakia (Rádio Top 100)	1
Slovakia (Singles Digitál Top 100)	36
Slovenia (SloTop50)	3
Spain (Promusicae)	9
Sweden (Sverigetopplistan)	3
Switzerland (Schweizer Hitparade)	1
UK Dance (Official Charts)	2
UK Singles (Official Charts)	3
US Hot Dance/Electronic Songs (Billboard)	24

=== Year-end charts ===
Chart (2013)	Position
Austria (Ö3 Austria Top 40)	29
France (SNEP)	144
Netherlands (Dutch Top 40)	110
Germany (Official German Charts)	13
Switzerland (Schweizer Hitparade)	39

Chart (2014)	Position
Australia (ARIA)	26
Austria (Ö3 Austria Top 40)	63
Belgium (Ultratop Flanders)	8
Belgium (Ultratop Wallonia)	10
France (SNEP)	24
Germany (Official German Charts)	49
Hungary (Single Top 40)	29
Italy (FIMI)	3
Netherlands (Dutch Top 40)	35
Netherlands (Single Top 100)	57
Poland (ZPAV)	3
Slovenia (SloTop50)	1
Spain (PROMUSICAE)	33
Sweden (Sverigetopplistan)	19
Switzerland (Schweizer Hitparade)	26
UK Singles (Official Charts Company)	68
US Hot Dance/Electronic Songs (Billboard)	63

== Certifications ==
Certifications for "Jubel"
Region	Certification	Certified units/sales
Australia (ARIA)	4× Platinum	280,000^{‡}
Austria (IFPI Austria)	Platinum	30,000^{*}
Belgium (BRMA)	Platinum	30,000^{*}
Canada (Music Canada)	Platinum	80,000^{‡}
France (SNEP)	Gold	75,000^{*}
Germany (BVMI)	2× Platinum	600,000^{‡}
Italy (FIMI)	5× Platinum	150,000^{‡}
Norway (IFPI Norway)	9× Platinum	90,000^{‡}
Portugal (AFP)	Gold	10,000^{‡}
Spain (Promusicae)	Platinum	60,000^{‡}
Sweden (GLF)	5× Platinum	200,000^{‡}
Switzerland (IFPI Switzerland)	Platinum	30,000^{^}
United Kingdom (BPI)	Platinum	600,000^{‡}
Streaming
Denmark (IFPI Danmark)	Platinum	2,600,000^{†}
Spain (Promusicae)	Gold	4,000,000^{†}
^{*} Sales figures based on certification alone.^{^} Shipments figures based on certification alone.^{‡} Sales+streaming figures based on certification alone.^{†} Streaming-only figures based on certification alone.

== Release history ==
Region	Date	Format	Track(s)	Label	Ref.
Various	5 April 2013	Digital download	"Jubel"; "Punga"	Self-released	
France	19 August 2013	Digital download	"Jubel"	Self-released	
Germany	13 September 2013	Digital download	"Jubel" (radio edit); "Jubel"	B1M1 Recordings	
Germany	9 October 2013	CD single	"Jubel" (radio edit); "Jubel"	B1M1 Recordings	
Italy	24 October 2013	Digital download	"Jubel" (radio edit); "Jubel"	Ego; Vae Victis	
Scandinavia	1 November 2013	Digital download	"Jubel" (radio edit)	Self-released	
Germany	8 November 2013	Digital download	"Jubel" (radio edit); "Punga"; "Jubel"; "Jubel" (Zero Set rewerk)	B1M1 Recordings	
Belgium	11 November 2013	Digital download	"Jubel" (radio edit); "Jubel"; "Jubel" (Zero Set remix); "Punga"	541; N.E.W.S.	
Netherlands	11 November 2013	Digital download	"Jubel" (radio edit)	Spinnin' Deep	
Italy	15 November 2013	Digital download	"Jubel"; "Jubel" (Zero Set remix); "Punga"	Ego; Vae Victis	
Italy	15 November 2013	Radio airplay	—N/a	Ego; Vae Victis	
France	18 November 2013	Digital download	"Jubel"; "Jubel" (radio edit); "Jubel" (Zero Set remix); "Punga"	Self-released	
Romania	25 November 2013	Digital download	"Jubel"; "Jubel" (radio edit)	Cat Music	
Poland	17 December 2013	Digital download	"Jubel"; "Jubel" (radio edit); "Jubel" (Zero Set remix); "Punga"	Magic Records	
Italy	18 December 2013	CD single	"Jubel"; "Jubel" (Zero Set remix); "Jubel" (radio edit); "Punga"	Ego; Vae Victis	
Italy	10 January 2014	Digital download	"Jubel" (2Elements and Dave Kurtis remix)	Ego; Vae Victis	
Spain	13 January 2014	Digital download	"Jubel" (radio edit)	Self-released	
Spain	13 January 2014	Digital download	"Jubel"; "Jubel" (Zero Set remix); "Punga"	Sony Spain	
Poland	7 March 2014	CD single	"Jubel"; "Jubel" (radio edit); "Jubel" (Zero Set remix); "Punga"	Magic Records	
United States	11 March 2014	Digital download	"Jubel"; "Punga"	Ultra Records	
South Africa	7 April 2014	Digital download	"Jubel"; "Jubel" (radio edit); "Jubel" (Zero Set remix); "Punga"	Just Music	
Italy	16 May 2014	Digital download	"Jubel" (Rudeejay, Marvin and Da Brozz remix)	Ego; Vae Victis	
United Kingdom	25 May 2014	Digital download	"Jubel" (UK radio edit)	One More Tune; Warner UK	
United Kingdom	25 May 2014	Digital download	"Jubel"; "Jubel" (Nora En Pure remix); "Jubel" (Friend Within remix); "Jubel" (Kant remix)	One More Tune; Warner UK	
United States	26 May 2014	Digital download	"Jubel"; "Jubel" (Nora En Pure remix); "Jubel" (Friend Within remix); "Jubel" (Kant remix)	Ultra Records	
Australia	30 May 2014	Digital download	"Jubel" (radio edit)	Neon Records	
New Zealand	30 May 2014	Digital download	"Jubel" (radio edit)	Neon Records	
Scandinavia	20 June 2014	Digital download	"Jubel" (Kant remix); "Jubel" (Nora En Pure remix); "Jubel" (Friend Within remix); "Punga"	Catchy Tunes; Family Tree Music	
United States	12 August 2014	Digital download	"Jubel" (Tube & Berger remix)	Ultra Records	
Australia	29 August 2014	Digital download	"Jubel" (Yolanda Be Cool remix); "Jubel" (Tube & Berger remix); "Jubel" (Friend Within remix); "Jubel" (Kant remix); "Jubel" (Nora En Pure remix); "Jubel" (Zero Set rewerk)	Neon Records	
Italy	12 September 2014	Digital download	"Jubel" (Tube & Berger remix)	Ego; Vae Victis	
