= Drive (Cory Marks song) =

2020 song by Cory Marks

Single by Cory Marks

from the album Who I Am
- Released: June 5, 2020 (Note: The track was not officially sent to country radio as a single until July 20, 2020.)
- Genre: Country; country rock
- Length: 3:34
- Label: Better Noise
- Songwriter(s): Cory Marks
- Producer(s): Kevin Churko; Kane Churko

Cory Marks singles chronology
"Outlaws & Outsiders" (2020)	"Drive" (2020)	"Blame It on the Double" (2020)

Music video
- "Drive" on YouTube

"Drive" is a song written and recorded by Canadian country rock artist Cory Marks. It was the second single from Marks' studio album Who I Am. The track was produced by Kevin Churko and Kane Churko.

== Background ==
Marks wrote "Drive" alone, and said it "is one of those summertime, roll down your window good feeling love songs".

== Critical reception ==
"Drive" received generally positive reviews. Dave Brooks of Billboard called the song a "made for country radio jam" and "anthem with a infectious hook and roll-down-your-window feel-good sound", noting inspiration from past country stars like Alan Jackson and Brooks & Dunn. Peter Coates of Think Country Music referred to it as a "top-down, feelgood, summer-cruising, country rocker". Tuonela Magazine wrote that the track is a "feel-good romance about trucks, driving, and love". Bethany Bowman of Main Street Nashville described the song as a "country classic".

== Music video ==
The official music video for "Drive" was directed by Ed Regan and premiered on June 4, 2020. It features Marks and actor/pilot Kristy Mair.
