= Teach Me (Lee Vasi song) =

Single by Lee Vasi

from the EP From Me, To God
- Released: January 12, 2024
- Recorded: 2023
- Genre: R&B
- Length: 2:20
- Label: Leeda Music Group
- Songwriters: Alex Corvera, Lee Vasi
- Producer: Loudestro

Lee Vasi singles chronology
"My Bad" (2023)	"Teach Me" (2024)	"Your Will" (2024)

"Teach Me" is a song by American gospel and R&B singer Lee Vasi. It was first released on January 12, 2024, through independent label, Leeda Music Group and was later included on Vasi’s first extended play, From Me, To God, on April 26, 2024. Upon release, the single gained widespread viral attention on social media leading it to debut at No. 2 on Billboards Gospel Digital Songs Sales chart on January 27, 2024.

"Teach Me" received three additional versions: an alternate version featuring Christian hip-hop artist Anike was released on April 5, 2024, a remix featuring gospel rapper Mike Teezy was released May 31, 2024, and the Spanish-language counterpart, "Enséñame", was issued June 21, 2024.

== Background and meaning ==
An R&B ballad, "Teach Me" blends vulnerable themes involving romantic love and doubt with empowering faith-based messaging, Vasi describes the song "as a way to "break up with toxic era and let God lead the way".

== Release ==
"Teach Me" was released digitally and to streaming platforms on January 12, 2024.

== Music video ==
To celebrate the single's viral success, the music video for, "Teach Me" was released on the song’s one-year anniversary on January 12, 2025. The video contains themes of introspection and features Vasi performing the song in various locations.

== Live performances ==
Lee Vasi premiered "Teach Me" live on Genius Open Mic on May 30, 2024; the performance marked the first Christian R&B act to be featured on the platform. As part of the Gospel Music Association Future Sounds Showcase, Vasi performed "Teach Me" on June 28. In September, Vasi was invited to On The Radar Radio for an exclusive performance of "Teach Me".

In 2025, "Teach Me" was included as part of Vasi's opening setlist for R&B and worship artist Ryan Ellis summer tour, Better Days.

In 2026, Vasi performed “Teach Me” on the mobile performance interview web series, CadillacChroniclesTV, hosted by artist Brian Freeman.

== Charts ==
Chart	Peak position
US Gospel Airplay (Billboard)	47
US Hot Gospel Songs (Billboard)	21
US Gospel Digital Song Sales (Billboard)	2
