= NAACP Image Award for Outstanding New Artist =

American music award

This article lists the winners and nominees for the NAACP Image Award for Outstanding New Artist.

== Winners and nominees ==
Winners are listed first and highlighted in bold.

=== 1980s ===
Year	Artist	Ref
1985
1985	**Whitney Houston**	
1986 – 88	—N/a	
1989
1989	**Vanessa Williams**	

=== 1990s ===
Year	Artist	Ref
1990
1990	**After 7**	
1991	—N/a	
1992
1992	**Boyz II Men**	
1992	C+C Music Factory	
1992	Lalah Hathaway	
1992	Lisa Fischer	
1992	Keith Washington	
1993
1993	**Arrested Development**	
1993	Jodeci	
1993	TLC	
1993	Mary J. Blige	
1993	Kris Kross	
1994
1994	**Shai**	
1994	Digable Planets	
1994	Silk	
1994	SWV	
1994	Tag Team	
1995	—N/a	
1996
1996	**Brandy**	
1996	D'Angelo	
1996	Kirk Franklin and the Family	
1996	Hootie & the Blowfish	
1996	Monica	
1997
1997	**Kenny Lattimore**	
1997	Eric Benét	
1997	Maxwell	
1997	Monifah	
1997	Az Yet	
1998
1998	**Erykah Badu**	
1998	God's Property	
1998	Missy Elliott	
1998	Puff Daddy	
1998	Wyclef Jean	
1999
1999	**Lauryn Hill**	
1999	Tatyana Ali	
1999	Big Pun	
1999	Mýa	
1999	Trin-i-tee 5:7	

=== 2000s ===
Year	Artist	Ref
2000
2000	**Eve**	
2000	Kevon Edmonds	
2000	Les Nubians	
2000	Angie Stone	
2000	Iyanla Vanzant	
2001
2001	**Carl Thomas**	
2001	Audra McDonald	
2001	Lucy Pearl	
2001	Jill Scott	
2001	Musiq Soulchild	
2002
2002	**Alicia Keys**	
2002	Bilal	
2002	City High	
2002	Nelly Furtado	
2002	India.Arie	
2003
2003	**Ashanti**	
2003	Amerie	
2003	Floetry	
2003	Kelly Rowland	
2003	Tweet	
2004
2004	**Ruben Studdard**	
2004	Beyoncé	
2004	Byron Cage	
2004	Anthony Hamilton	
2004	Heather Headley	
2005
2005	**Kanye West**	
2005	Fantasia	
2005	Van Hunt	
2005	John Legend	
2005	Mario Winans	
2006
2006	**Chris Brown**	
2006	Bobby V	
2006	Keyshia Cole	
2006	Leela James	
2006	Omarion	
2007
2007	**Corinne Bailey Rae**	
2007	Cherish	
2007	Lupe Fiasco	
2007	LeToya	
2007	Mario Vazquez	
2008
2008	**Jordin Sparks**	
2008	Corbin Bleu	
2008	J. Holiday	
2008	Sean Kingston	
2008	Chrisette Michele	
2009
2009	**Jennifer Hudson**	
2009	Anthony David	
2009	Estelle	
2009	Leona Lewis	
2009	Jazmine Sullivan	

=== 2010s ===
Year	Artist	Ref
2010
2010	**Keri Hilson**	
2010	Kristinia DeBarge	
2010	Melanie Fiona	
2010	Jeremih	
2010	K'Jon	
2011
2011	**Willow Smith**	
2011	B.o.B	
2011	Jason Derulo	
2011	Bruno Mars	
2011	Nicki Minaj	
2012
2012	**Diggy Simmons**	
2012	Committed	
2012	Mindless Behavior	
2012	Landau Eugene Murphy, Jr.	
2012	Wynter Gordon	
2013
2013	**Elle Varner**	
2013	Melanie Amaro	
2013	Gary Clark, Jr.	
2013	Lianne La Havas	
2013	The OMG Girlz	
2014
2014	**K. Michelle**	
2014	RaVaughn Brown	
2014	Candice Glover	
2014	Ariana Grande	
2014	Zendaya	
2015
2015	**3 Winans Brothers**	
2015	Jhené Aiko	
2015	Aloe Blacc	
2015	Erica Campbell	
2015	Liv Warfield	
2016
2016	**Jussie Smollett**	
2016	Andra Day	
2016	Judith Hill	
2016	The Weeknd	
2016	Yazz	
2017
2017	**Chance the Rapper**	
2017	Chloe x Halle	
2017	Ro James	
2017	MAJOR	
2017	Serayah	
2018
2018	**SZA**	
2018	Demetria McKinney	
2018	Khalid	
2018	Kevin Ross	
2018	Vic Mensa	
2019
2019	**Ella Mai**	
2019	Jade Novah	
2019	Koryn Hawthorne	
2019	Omar Wilson	
2019	Tory Lanez	

=== 2020s ===
Year	Artist	Ref
2020
2020	**Lil Nas X**	
2020	Ari Lennox	
2020	Lucky Daye	
2020	Mahalia	
2020	Mykal Kilgore	
2021
2021	**Doja Cat**	
2021	Chika	
2021	D Smoke	
2021	Giveon	
2021	Skip Marley	
2022
2022	**Saweetie**	
2022	Cynthia Erivo	
2022	Jimmie Allen	
2022	Tems	
2022	Zoe Wees	
2023
2023	**Coco Jones**	
2023	Adam Blackstone	
2023	Armani White	
2023	Fivio Foreign	
2023	Steve Lacy	
2024
2024	**Victoria Monét**	
2024	FLO	
2024	Jordan Ward	
2024	Leon Thomas	
2024	October London	
2025
2025	**Doechii**	
2025	Myles Smith	
2025	Samoht	
2025	Shaboozey	
2025	Tyla	
2026
2026	**Monaleo**	
2026	Elmiene	
2026	Lee Vasi	
2026	Madison McFerrin	
2026	Ravyn Lenae	
