= Who I Am (Cory Marks album) =

Studio album by Cory Marks
- Released: August 7, 2020
- Studio: The Hideout, Las Vegas, NV
- Genre: Country rock
- Length: 44:25
- Label: Better Noise
- Producer: Kevin Churko; Kane Churko

Cory Marks chronology
This Man (2015)	Who I Am (2020)	Nashville Mornings (2021)

Singles from Who I Am
- 1. "Outlaws & Outsiders" Released: March 4, 2020; 2. "Drive" Released: July 20, 2020; 3. "Blame It on the Double" Released: October 5, 2020

Professional ratings
Review scores
Source	Rating
Maximum Volume	9/10 stars
Entertainment Focus	4/5 stars
Ramzine	4/5 stars

Who I Am is the second studio album by Canadian country rock artist Cory Marks, and was released on August 7, 2020 through Better Noise Music. It includes the singles "Outlaws and Outsiders", "Drive" and "Blame It on the Double".

== Background ==
Marks spent five years co-writing and recording the songs for this album with producer Kevin Churko. Marks frequently travelled from his hometown North Bay, Ontario to Churko's studio "The Hideout" in Las Vegas, Nevada to work on the album.

== Critical reception ==
Dave Brooks of Billboard referred to the album as the "Long Awaited Next Generation Country Rock Record". Nanci Dagg of Canadian Beats Media said of Marks and the album: "his style is outlaw country/country rock and he pulls it off like no other. He has a boisterous sound and unique style that will always impress those who have come to know him and his music". Rock 'N' Load Magazine said the "album is packed with a gnarly backbone and beautiful melodies intertwined right across the thirteen fine recordings". Andy Morley of Maximum Volume Music stated the album is "for the good ol’ boys, [it's] never meaning no harm, oh and it's going to take over the world. See, a college hockey player, and a pilot he might have been, but these days Cory Marks is about to break out as a big star.

== Singles ==
Marks released his first single on Better Noise Music, "Outlaws & Outsiders", featuring Ivan Moody, Travis Tritt, and Mick Mars, in November 2019. It debuted at #1 on iTunes in Canada as well as #1 on the Billboard Rock Digital Songs and Hard Rock Digital Songs charts and #7 on the Country Digital Songs charts and would later peak inside the top 10 on US Mainstream Rock radio, top 5 on German rock radio, and at #12 on Canada Rock radio.

Marks released three promotional singles, "Better Off", "Blame It on the Double", and "Devil's Grin", prior to officially announcing the album.

In June 2020, Marks released "Drive", and announced it as the second single to country radio off the simultaneously announced album.

"Blame It on the Double" became the album’s second single to rock radio in Germany and the United Kingdom in October 2020. A later version of the song featuring Tyler Connolly of Theory of a Deadman was sent to Canadian country radio, while another version featuring Connolly and Jason Hook was sent to Canadian rock radio.

== Track listing ==
No.	Title	Writer(s)	Length
1.	"Devil's Grin"	Cory Marks; Kane Churko; Kevin Churko	2:43
2.	"Outlaws & Outsiders" (featuring Travis Tritt, Ivan Moody & Mick Mars)	Marks; Churko; Churko	3:17
3.	"Good to Be Us"	Randy Montana; Jeremy Stover; Andrew Petroff	2:57
4.	"Blame It on the Double"	Marks; Churko; Churko	3:27
5.	"Another Night in Jail"	Marks; Churko; Churko	3:36
6.	"Who I Am"	Marks	2:53
7.	"Drive"	Marks	3:34
8.	"Better Off"	Marks; Kevin Churko	3:17
9.	"My Whiskey Your Wine"	Marks	3:16
10.	"Keep Doing What I Do"	Marks; Churko; Churko	3:33
11.	"Out in the Rain" (featuring Lzzy Hale)	Marks; Churko; Churko	4:14

Bonus tracks (CD/Digital/Streaming only)
No.	Title	Writer(s)	Length
12.	"She’s Hollywood"	Marks; Churko; Churko	4:16
13.	"My Whiskey Your Wine" (acoustic)	Marks	3:16

== Personnel ==
Adapted from the album liner notes.

- Scotty Alexander - electric guitar, acoustic guitar, fiddle, banjo
- Jay Buettner - electric guitar
- Kane Churko - electric guitar, acoustic guitar, keys, production, engineering
- Kevin Churko - electric guitar, acoustic guitar, mandolin, bass guitar, keys, drums, production, engineering, mixing, mastering
- Khloe Churko - studio assistance
- Jody Domingue - photography
- Alex Donaldson - electric guitar
- Joel Ferguson - steel guitar, slide guitar
- Bob Funk - electric guitar, acoustic guitar, mandolin, banjo
- Tristin Hardin - editing
- Lzzy Hale - featured vocals on "Out in the Rain"
- Shane Hendrickson - bass guitar
- Cory Marks - lead vocals, acoustic guitar, drums
- Mick Mars - electric guitar on "Outlaws & Outsiders"
- Shawn McGhee - editing
- Ivan Moody - featured vocals on "Outlaws & Outsiders"
- Marc Muller - electric guitar, steel guitar, slide guitar
- Ed Regan - photography
- Travis Tritt - featured vocals on "Outlaws & Outsiders"
- Justin Schipper - steel guitar, slide guitar
- Adam Wakeman - organ
- John Wellman - artwork

== Charts ==
=== Album ===
Chart (2020)	Peak position
Australian Country Albums (ARIA)	16
Canada Top 20 (MC)	12
Swiss Albums (Schweizer Hitparade)	98
UK Country Albums (OCC)	6
US Top Album Sales (Billboard)	74
US Heatseekers Albums (Billboard)	17

=== Singles ===
Year	Single	Peak positions					
Year	Single	AUS Country	CAN Digital	CAN Rock	US Country Digital	US Main Rock	US Rock
2020	"Outlaws & Outsiders" (featuring Ivan Moody, Travis Tritt and Mick Mars)	41	11	12	7	10	14
2020	"Drive"	—	—	—	—	—	—
2020	"Blame It on the Double"	—	—	—	—	—	—
"—" denotes releases that did not chart or were not released in that territory.

== Awards and nominations ==
Year	Award	Category	Work	Result	Ref
2021	Canadian Country Music Awards	Alternative Country Album of the Year	Who I Am	Nominated	
2022	Country Music Association of Ontario	Songwriter(s) of the Year	"Blame It on the Double" (with Kevin Churko and Kane Churko)	Nominated	

== Release history ==
Release formats for Who I Am
Country	Date	Format	Label	Ref.
Various	August 7, 2020	Digital download	Better Noise Music	
Various	August 7, 2020	Compact disc	Better Noise Music	
Various	August 7, 2020	Streaming	Better Noise Music	
Various	August 28, 2020	Vinyl	Better Noise Music	
