= Sorry for Nothing =

2024 album by Cory Marks

Studio album by Cory Marks
- Released: December 6, 2024
- Genre: Country rock
- Length: 43:50
- Label: Better Noise
- Producer: Andrew Baylis; Kevin Churko; Kile Odell

Cory Marks chronology
| I Rise (2022) | Sorry for Nothing (2024) | Sorry for Nothing Vol. 2 (2025) |

Singles from Sorry for Nothing
- 1. "Drunk When I'm High"; 2. "(Make My) Country Rock"; 3. "Fast as I Can"; 4. "Guilty"

Sorry for Nothing is the third studio album by Canadian country rock artist Cory Marks. It was primarily produced by Andrew Baylis, Kevin Churko, and Kile Odell, and released on December 6, 2024, via Better Noise Music. The album includes Marks' second single to U.S. rock radio "(Make My) Country Rock", as well as the singles "Drunk When I'm High", "Fast as I Can", and "Guilty", which were sent to various international country and rock radio formats. Marks released a follow-up album titled Sorry for Nothing Vol. 2 on October 3, 2025.

== Background and promotion ==
In a press release, Marks stated the album "is really who I am," adding that he always wanted to 'pave his own lane' and that "whether you’re a rock fan, a metal fan or a country music fan, my mission is to reach anyone who feels a little different". He wanted the album to have "songs for partying, songs to look back on life and have a good cry, love songs" and "something for everyone". Marks wrote or co-wrote every song on the album, with the exception of the final song, a cover of Foo Fighters' "Learn to Fly". Marks elected to cover "Learn to Fly" as he is a pilot and a "huge aviation guy", and he and producer Kevin Churko wanted to make their own version of it that featured more steel guitar.

Marks embarked on his "Sorry for Nothing Tour" to support the album, which included headlining dates in Germany, France, and Canada, as well as festival stops in the Netherlands and Great Britain.

== Critical reception ==
Jason Hopper of Rock Poser Dot Com stated that Sorry for Nothing is "one of the most interesting and refreshing albums" that he has heard in years. He praised the "perfect mix of both rock and country styles" and said there is "not a bad track on the album", adding that this is the album that Bon Jovi should have recorded when they released Lost Highway in 2007. An uncredited review from Metal Planet Music called the release a "mighty album", adding that it "covers a lot of ground with its mish-mash of Country, Rock and Metal stylings but ultimately it does sound very cohesive and there is no denying the quality of songwriting, performance or production on it, which is top notch". Jenna Melanson of Canadian Beats Media opined that the album was "delivered with raw energy and authenticity".

== Track listing ==
Sorry for Nothing
| No. | Title | Writer(s) | Length |
|---|---|---|---|
| 1. | "(Make My) Country Rock" (featuring Sully Erna of Godsmack, Travis Tritt, and Mick Mars) | Cory Marks; Blair Daly; Zac Maloy | 3:08 |
| 2. | "Guilty" (featuring DL of Bad Wolves) | Marks; Daly; Maloy; Kile Odell | 2:59 |
| 3. | "Whiskey for Sale" | Marks; Aaron Gillespie; Logan Wall | 3:11 |
| 4. | "Sorry for Nothing" | Marks; Gillespie; Riley Thomas | 3:18 |
| 5. | "Drunk When I'm High" | Marks; Kane Churko; Kevin Churko | 2:26 |
| 6. | "17" | Marks; Carson Chamberlain; Jacob Bryant | 2:54 |
| 7. | "Fast as I Can" | Marks; J.T. Harding; Steve Brown | 2:56 |
| 8. | "Tough to Be Strong" | Marks; Churko; Churko | 3:19 |
| 9. | "A Lot Like Me" | Marks; Josh Dunne; Mike Fiorentino | 2:34 |
| 10. | "1949" | Marks; Craig Brooks | 3:48 |
| 11. | "Lit Up" | Marks; Skidd Mills | 2:52 |
| 12. | "Late Night of Drinking Again" | Marks | 3:06 |
| 13. | "(Make My) Country Rock - Harder" (featuring Sully Erna of Godsmack, Travis Tritt, and Mick Mars) | Marks; Daly; Maloy | 3:11 |
| 14. | "Learn to Fly" | Dave Grohl; Nate Mendel; Taylor Hawkins | 4:00 |
| Total length: | | | 43:50 |

== Personnel ==
Adapted from the CD liner notes.

- Andrew Baylis – production (tracks 1, 3–4, 6–7, 9, 11–12)
- Kane Churko – co-production, engineering (tracks 5, 8, 10, 13)
- Kevin Churko – engineering, mixing, production (tracks 5, 8, 10, 13)
- Jim Cooley – mixing (tracks 1, 3–4, 6–7, 9, 11–12)
- Tristan Hardin – engineering, editing, mastering (tracks 5, 8, 10, 13)
- Ted Jensen – mastering (tracks 1, 3–4, 6–7, 9, 11–12)
- Cory Marks – primary vocals, composition
- Kurtis Norris – cover photo
- Kile Odell – mastering, mixing, production (track 2)
- Ed Regan – photography
- John Wellman – design, layout, interior BTS photos

== Charts ==
=== Singles ===
| Year | Single | Peak positions | | | |
| Year | Single | AUS Country | US Hard Rock | US Hard Rock Digi. | US Main Rock |
|---|---|---|---|---|---|
| 2024 | "Drunk When I'm High" | 34 | — | — | — |
| 2024 | "(Make My) Country Rock" | — | 14 | 3 | 19 |
| 2024 | "Fast as I Can" | 43 | — | — | — |
| 2025 | "Guilty" | — | — | — | — |
"—" denotes releases that did not chart or were not released in that territory.

== Release history ==
Release formats for Sorry for Nothing
| Country | Date | Format | Label | Ref. |
|---|---|---|---|---|
| Various | December 6, 2024 | CD | Better Noise Music | |
| Various | December 6, 2024 | LP record | Better Noise Music | |
| Various | December 6, 2024 | Digital download | Better Noise Music | |
| Various | December 6, 2024 | Streaming | Better Noise Music | |
