= This Man (album) =

Studio album by Cory Marks
- Released: May 26, 2015
- Genre: Country; country rock
- Length: 32:10
- Label: Big Star; 306
- Producer: Cory Marks; Danick Dupelle; Rob Crosby; James Dean Hicks; Murray Pulver

Cory Marks chronology
First Time Around (2012)	This Man (2015)	Who I Am (2020)

Singles from This Man
- 1. "Smartphone" Released: July 1, 2014; 2. "21" Released: April 21, 2015; 3. "This Man" Released: August 11, 2015; 4. "Nowhere with You" Released: January 5, 2016

This Man is the first studio album by Canadian country rock artist Cory Marks. It was released on May 26, 2015 through Big Star Recordings.

== Background ==
Marks released his debut Canadian country radio single "Smartphone" in July 2014. The track was one of eight tracks that he co-wrote on the album. Marks co-wrote these tracks during writing trips to Nashville between the Fall of 2012 and November 2014. The second single to radio, "21" was released in April 2015. The title track "This Man" became the third single in August 2015, while "Nowhere with You" was released to radio as the fourth single in January 2016.

== Track listing ==
No.	Title	Writer(s)	Length
1.	"21"	Cory Marks; Jason Deere; Rob Crosby	3:37
2.	"Nowhere with You"	Marks; Jon McElroy; Terry Lee Palmer	2:49
3.	"This Man"	Crosby; Eric Paslay	3:21
4.	"Don't Count Saturday Night"	Brian Davis; Josh Thompson; Kendell Marvel	2:46
5.	"Rock Me Steady"	Marks; Deere; Crosby	3:35
6.	"Take You Home Tonight"	Marks; James Dean Hicks	3:32
7.	"Smartphone"	Marks; Deere; Crosby	2:52
8.	"Teach Me"	Marks; Crosby; Liz Hengber	3:52
9.	"I Need a Beer"	Marks; McElroy; Crosby	2:41
10.	"Burnin' Up the Blacktop"	Marks; Hicks	3:06
Total length:			32:10

== Singles ==
Year	Single
2014	"Smartphone"
2015	"21"
2015	"This Man"
2016	"Nowhere with You"

== Release history ==
Release formats for This Man
Country	Date	Format	Label	Ref.
Various	May 26, 2015	Compact disc	Big Star Recordings	
Various	May 26, 2015	Digital download	Big Star Recordings	
Various	May 26, 2015	Streaming	Big Star Recordings	
