= Riva (Restart the Game) =

Single by Klingande featuring Broken Back
- Released: 2 March 2015
- Recorded: 2014
- Genre: Deep house
- Length: 5:14 (original version); 3:00 (single edit)
- Songwriters: Cédric Steinmyller; Greg Zlap
- Producer: Klingande

Klingande singles chronology
| "Jubel" (2013) | "Riva (Restart the Game)" (2015) | "Losing U" (2016) |

"Riva (Restart the Game)" is a song by French deep house producer Klingande featuring vocals from Broken Back. The song was released in France as a digital download on 2 March 2015. It charted in Austria, Belgium, France, Germany, Italy, Norway and Switzerland. Written and produced by Klingande, the song also features harmonica played by Greg Zlap and is not a saxophone that has been modified as some people have believed.

== Music video ==
A music video to accompany the release of "Riva (Restart the Game)" was first released onto YouTube on 19 March 2015, at a total length of four minutes and twenty-five seconds.

== Charts ==
=== Weekly charts ===
| Chart (2015) | Peak position |
|---|---|
| Australia (ARIA) | 56 |
| Austria (Ö3 Austria Top 40) | 13 |
| Belgium (Ultratip Bubbling Under Flanders) | 20 |
| France (SNEP) | 144 |
| Germany (GfK) | 9 |
| Italy (FIMI) | 19 |
| Norway (VG-lista) | 36 |
| Poland (Polish Airplay Top 100) | 14 |
| Poland (Polish Airplay New) | 5 |
| Slovenia (SloTop50) | 15 |
| Sweden Heatseeker (Sverigetopplistan) | 3 |
| Switzerland (Schweizer Hitparade) | 6 |

=== Year-end charts ===
| Chart (2015) | Position |
|---|---|
| Austria (Ö3 Austria Top 40) | 72 |
| Germany (Official German Charts) | 84 |
| Italy (FIMI) | 96 |
| Switzerland (Schweizer Hitparade) | 60 |

== Certifications ==
| Region | Certification | Certified units/sales |
|---|---|---|
| Germany (BVMI) | Gold | 200,000^{‡} |
| Italy (FIMI) | Platinum | 50,000^{‡} |
^{‡} Sales+streaming figures based on certification alone.

== Release history ==
| Region | Date | Format |
|---|---|---|
| France | 2 March 2015 | Digital download |
