= Kidda =

Kidda is the artist name for UK electronic music and video producer Ste McGregor. Described by one national newspaper in the UK as "a bearded 30-something one-man cottage industry", he is signed to the Brighton-based Skint Records – the home of Fatboy Slim, a.k.a. Norman Cook. McGregor has released one album on Skint, "Going Up", and his second long-player "Hotel Radio" is scheduled for release in the summer of 2011. In 2008, his track "Under The Sun" was used in Bacardi's worldwide TV advertising campaign, and other singles from his debut sample-based album such as "Strong Together" have made the charts in several European countries including Italy, Belgium and the Netherlands, and has recently been licensed to Ultra Records in America. In addition to being a recording artist and DJ, Kidda is an animator and video director and has made music promos for assorted artists such as Midfield General, the Lo-Fidelity Allstars, X-Press 2 and Phil Kieran – as well as completing animation work for the stage shows of US artists Kanye West and Rihanna. McGregor also sewed his own tapestry to make up the artwork for his 2008-released album "Going Up".

Born and raised in Middlesbrough in the north-east of England, McGregor moved to Nottingham in the Midlands region of the UK to study fine art. In his spare time he began to craft hip-hop beats, and after completing an MA in animation back in Middlesbrough he moved to Brighton on the south coast of England. He moved into a house with Skint Records artist Danielsan, and was soon invited to make a promo video for Danielsan's "Force Ten" single. This led to more video work with other Skint Records artists, and after a couple of EPs for the Brighton-based Catskills Records in the mid-2000s (decade) – "The Shoe Cash EP" and "The Word Booty EP" – he signed to Skint as a recording artist. Kidda's debut album featured Gary Lightbody from indie band Snow Patrol (on "Shining 1") and various other vocalists, and was notable for being constructed from samples that were then all re-recorded. First single from the album, "Smile", used the theme tune from BBC sports show Ski Sunday, while "Under The Sun" contained elements of a song written by US songwriters Ashford and Simpson. A section of the single was used in a Bacardi worldwide TV advertising campaign, although most of the money the spirits company paid for its use went to Ashford and Simpson's publishers EMI.

The "Going Up" album received favourable reviews in most music publications. "With infectious hooks, tasty beats and soul-tinged melodies, Kidda’s debut feels like the natural sequel to The Avalanches' universally acclaimed 'Since I Left You',” said MOJO magazine. It was awarded album of the month status in DJ magazine, album of the week in DMC Update, while BBC Music said: "Somewhere between funk, pop, hip-hop and old skool rave, 'Going Up' is the perfect soundtrack to this summer's festivals". However, the same review went on to say: "While Going Up's blatant and intended cheesiness appeals to this particular scribe, more straight-laced musos may find it all a bit too camp and annoying. Basically Kidda's a bit like Marmite; you'll either love him or hate him." The NME, meanwhile, said: "Like airy muzak in a shopping centre, most of 'Going Up' washes over you."

The remix of "Under The Sun" by British producer Hervé was a club hit supported by the likes of BBC Radio One's Annie Mac and Kissy Sellout and was subsequently licensed to a number of compilations, including Ministry of Sound's "The Annual 2009" and Godskitchen "Anthems 2009". "Strong Together" was also used on a TV ad for Warner Leisure. Second album "Hotel Radio" is thought to have a more pop-orientated feel, and contain no samples whatsoever – it's purported to be all original songwriting from Kidda and his co-writer Lee Muddy Baker. McGregor is also thought to be preparing a live show to support the release of "Hotel Radio".

== Discography ==
Singles:

- The Shoe Cash EP (Catskills Records, 2004)
- The Word Booty EP (Catskills Records, 2005)
- V.I.P. featuring Psycho Les (Skint Records, 2007)
- Smile (Skint Records, 2008)
- Under The Sun (Skint Records, 2008)
- Strong Together (Skint Records, 2009)
- Feel Too Good (Skint Records, 2009)
- Wanna Be Loved (Skint Records, 2009)

Albums:

- Going Up (Skint, 2008)
- Hotel Radio (Skint Records, 2010)
