= Ryan Ellis (singer) =

American singer-songwriter

- Origin: San Diego, California
- Genres: CCM
- Occupation: Singer-songwriter
- Instruments: Vocals, Guitar
- Years active: 2017-present
- Label: Provident Label Group
- Website: www.ryanellismusic.com

Ryan Ellis is a contemporary Christian pop, R&B, and worship singer from Orange, CA known for the hit song, “Heart of the Father.” He is currently signed to Provident Label Group.

== Background ==
Ryan Ellis was born in San Diego and raised by a single mother. Ellis spent five years in the U.S. Navy. He did a tour of duty in Afghanistan. He found his passion for music as a founding member of the hip-hop dance team Jabbawockeez. He was the worship leader of Isla Upper.

== Career ==
Ryan Ellis first major success was the single "Heart of the Father." The song came out of Ellis’ time spent in California with the charitable organization Isla Vista Worship. The online publication Aleteia said,"'Heart of the Father' is a tune firmly planted at the junction of Christian music and R&B. The tune is a powerful one that gives rise to goosebumps from the first chorus."

Ellis released his self-titled album which included "Heart of the Father" in July 2023, with the album peaking at No. 2 at Mediabase and receiving more than 34 million streams.

Ellis also recorded the song Son of David with singer Brandon Lake.

On July 14, 2023, Ellis released the 5 song EP 'Nite-N-Day.'

In 2022, Ellis toured with Christian artist Big Daddy Weave.

Before his solo success, in 2014 Ellis joined the Housefires Gospel Community, an inclusivity-driven music collective made up of GRAMMY-nominated and chart-topping artists and songwriters. The group released two albums in 2023, 'How to start a House, Part 1 & 2.

Ryan Ellis and his wife, Cassie, announced they were expecting a baby boy in late November 2022.

== Discography ==
=== Albums ===
- Ryan Ellis (Provident Label Group, 2022)
- Lyfe (The Fuel, 2019)
- Isla Vista Worship Presents Ryan Ellis Live from the Upper Room II (Independent, 2015)

=== EPs ===
- Nite-N-Day (Provident Label Group, 2023)
- Ryan Ellis Live (Provident Label Group, 2023)
- Episode 1 - EP (Provident Label Group, 2021)
- Rysponse (The Fuel, 2019)
- Kingdom Glory (Independent, 2015)

=== Singles ===
- "More Than Enough" w/Lee Vasi (Provident Label Group, 2025)
- "Gonna Be Alright" w/Cecily (Provident Label Group, 2023)
- "I Thank God" (Provident Label Group, 2023)
- "Lean on the Lord (Live)" (Provident Label Group, 2023)
- "Unto Us" (Provident Label Group, 2022)
- "New Wine Flow" (Provident Label Group, 2022)
- "Lean on the Lord" (Provident Label Group, 2022)
- "Gonna Be Alright" (Provident Label Group, 2022)
- "Heart of the Father" w/DOE (Provident Label Group, 2022)
- "Need" (Provident Label Group, 2021)
- "Keep My Eyes Up" (Provident Label Group, 2021)
- "Heart of the Father" (Provident Label Group, 2021)
- "Like You" (West Coast Worship, 2019)
- "Lyfe" (Independent, 2019)
- "Closer" (Independent, 2019)
- "Lyfe" (Independent, 2019)
