= Teach Me (Bakermat song) =

Single by Bakermat
- Released: 24 November 2014
- Genre: Electronic; house
- Length: 3:08 (radio edit) 3:45 (Promo, 2014)
- Label: Dirty Soul Music/Be Yourself Music
- Songwriters: Shirley Caesar, Lodewijk Fluttert, Clifford Goilo
- Producers: Lodewijk Fluttert, Clifford Goilo

Bakermat singles chronology
"One Day (Vandaag)" (2014)	"Teach Me" (2014)

"Teach Me"
30-second sample showcasing the vocal section and beat drop

"Teach Me" is a song by Dutch producer Bakermat. It was released on 24 November 2014 by the Dirty Soul Music division of Be Yourself Music as the first single of his upcoming debut album, which was to be released in early 2015.

The song consists of samples of American gospel singer Shirley Caesar's song "Teach Me Master", which originally appeared on her 1972 album Get Up My Brother.

== Charts ==
Chart (2015)	Peak position
Austria (Ö3 Austria Top 40)	45
Belgium (Ultratop 50 Flanders)	25
Belgium (Ultratop 50 Wallonia)	49
France (SNEP)	167
Germany (GfK)	42
Netherlands (Dutch Top 40)	35
Netherlands (Single Top 100)	53
Switzerland (Schweizer Hitparade)	66
UK Singles (Official Charts)	22

== Certifications ==
Region	Certification	Certified units/sales
United Kingdom (BPI)	Silver	200,000^{‡}
^{‡} Sales+streaming figures based on certification alone.
