= Klingande =

French DJ and producer (born 1990)

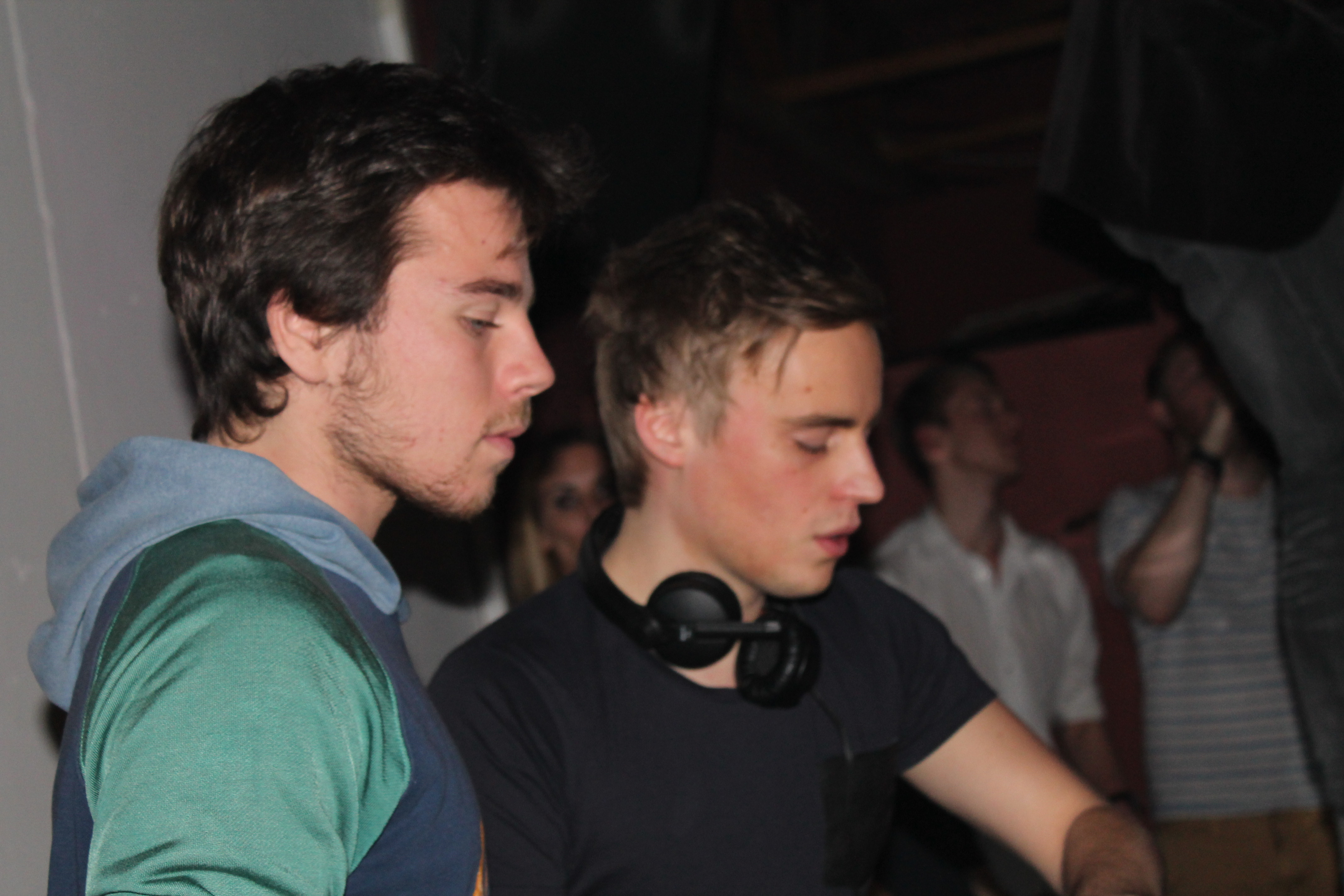
- Klingande in 2014

Background information
- Born: Cédric Steinmyller; 14 May 1990 (age 36); Croix, Hauts-de-France, France
- Genres: Deep house; tropical house
- Occupations: DJ; record producer
- Instruments: Digital audio workstation; piano; saxophone
- Years active: 2012–present
- Labels: Klingande Music; Ultra Music
- Website: www.klingandemusic.com

Klingande (Swedish: [ˈklɪ̂ŋːandɛ], lit. 'chiming'; born 14 May 1990), is a stage name of a French DJ and producer Cédric Steinmyller. (French pronunciation: [sedʁik ʃtajnmilœʁ]) "Klingande" in a Swedish language means for "ringing". Klingande was formerly a duo, which included Steinmyller and Edgar Catri; the latter left the duo in 2014.

== Background ==
=== Name origin ===
The stage name, as well as some of Klingande's songs, are in Swedish because of Steinmyller's admiration of the language. According to him, it sounds like it is being sung when it is just being spoken. With this in mind, the name was founded after a search in a Swedish dictionary. Klingande is the present participle of the Swedish verb (att) klinga, which means '(to) chime' or '(to) sound'. The artist name thus means 'chiming' or 'sounding'. Klingande is also inspired by Steinmyller's admiration for Swedish artists such as Avicii and Swedish House Mafia.

=== Musical style ===
Steinmyller describes his music as "melodic house".

== Career ==
=== 2012: Formation ===
Formed in December 2012, Klingande was originally a duo consisting of Steinmyller and fellow Frenchman Edgar Catry (born 1990). When they were 10 years old, Catry and Steinmyller met at the Cross School, in northern France. Steinmyller was more interested in the teaching of music theory before he distinguishing himself as a DJ whereas Catry was more interested in piano, which he studied for more than four years. Steinmyller had moved to London to study at Point Blank Music College for a year. After returning from London to his hometown, Steinmyller had spent time with Catry before discovering their same admiration for deep house producers such as Bakermat and Nico Push. Klingande was soon formed.

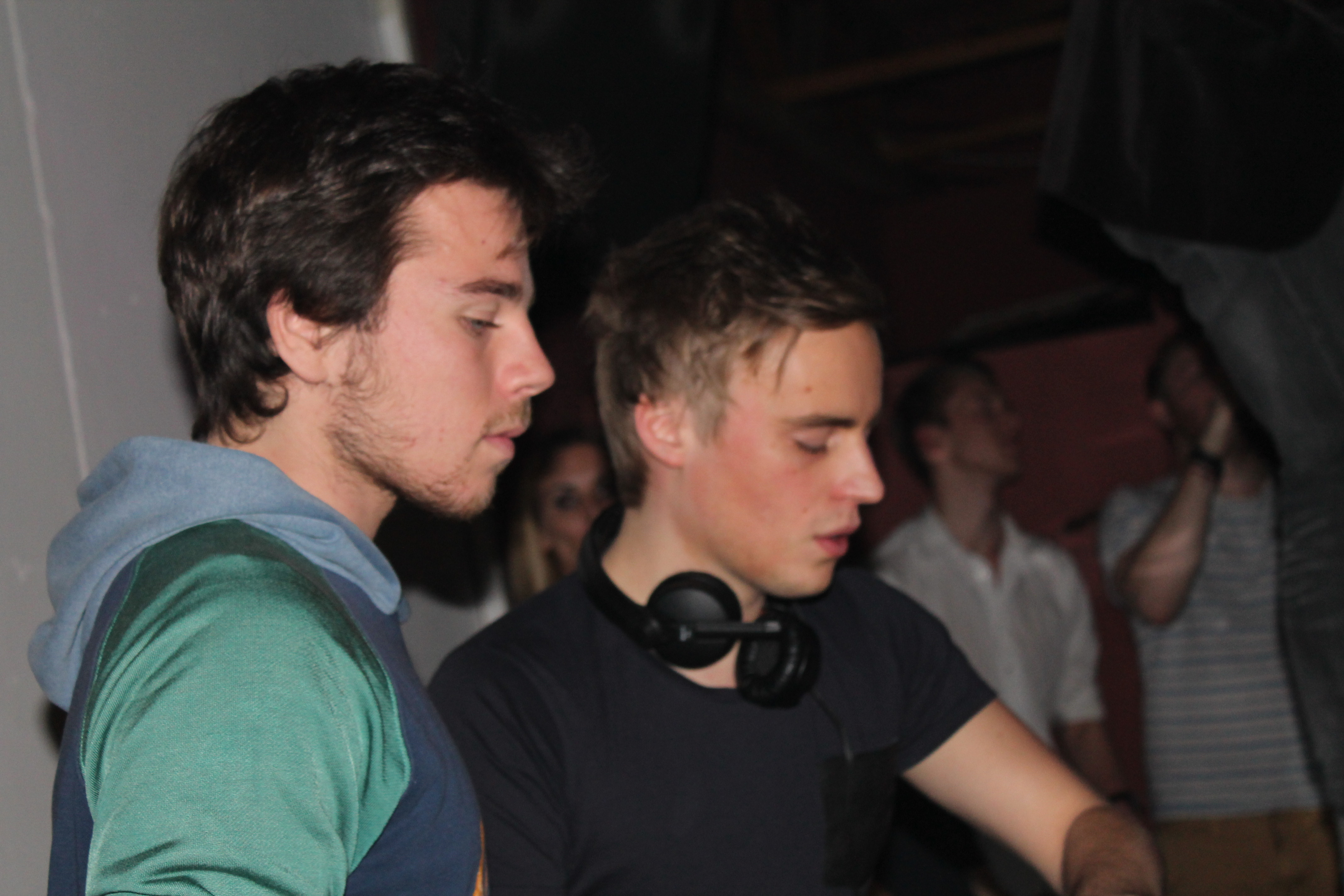
Steinmyller and Catry in 2013.

=== 2013: "Punga" and "Jubel" ===
Klingande self-released their debut single, "Punga", which gained attention and eventually made it to the French Singles Chart, peaking at number 86; the song also peaked at number 62 in Austria, number 59 in Germany and number 41 in Switzerland. They found international chart success with their follow-up single "Jubel" which was released on 1 January 2013. The song peaked at number 5 on the French Singles Chart and at number one in Austria, Belgium, Germany, Italy, Switzerland and Poland. The song was also a top five hit in Australia, France, Finland, Norway, Sweden and the United Kingdom and a top 10 hit in Denmark and the Netherlands.

=== 2014: Klingande goes solo ===
In 2014, they released a remix of Clean Bandit's "Extraordinary". Edgar Catry left the group shortly after, prompting Steinmyller to continue using the stage name, as a solo act.

=== 2015–present: "Riva", "Losing U" and "Somewhere New" ===
On 2 March 2015, Steinmyller released his first single as a solo act, titled "Riva (Restart the Game)" featuring French singer Broken Back. It was released via Klingande Music with exclusive license to Ultra Records. An official music video was uploaded by Ultra Records' YouTube channel on 19 March 2015. The song charted in several countries including France, Austria, Australia, Belgium, Germany, Italy, Norway and Switzerland. It was also certified gold by FIMI.

In 2016, he released two singles: "Losing U" featuring Daylight, and "Somewhere New" featuring M-22 and uncredited vocals from English recording artist Jodie Connor. An official music video for "Losing U" was uploaded by Ultra Records on 11 March 2016.

Klingande's 2017 single "Pumped Up", featuring uncredited vocals from Lauren "LYON" Malyon, went on to chart in four countries. (The song is a reinterpretation of "Pumped Up Kicks" by Foster the People.)

Klingande released the single "Ready for Love" with UK singer-songwriter Joe Killington and featuring French harmonica player, Greg Zlap, on 26 April 2019 via Ultra Music.

== Discography ==
=== Albums ===
Title	Album details
The Album	Released: 15 November 2019; Format: CD, digital download; Label: Ultra, Klingande Music

=== Singles ===
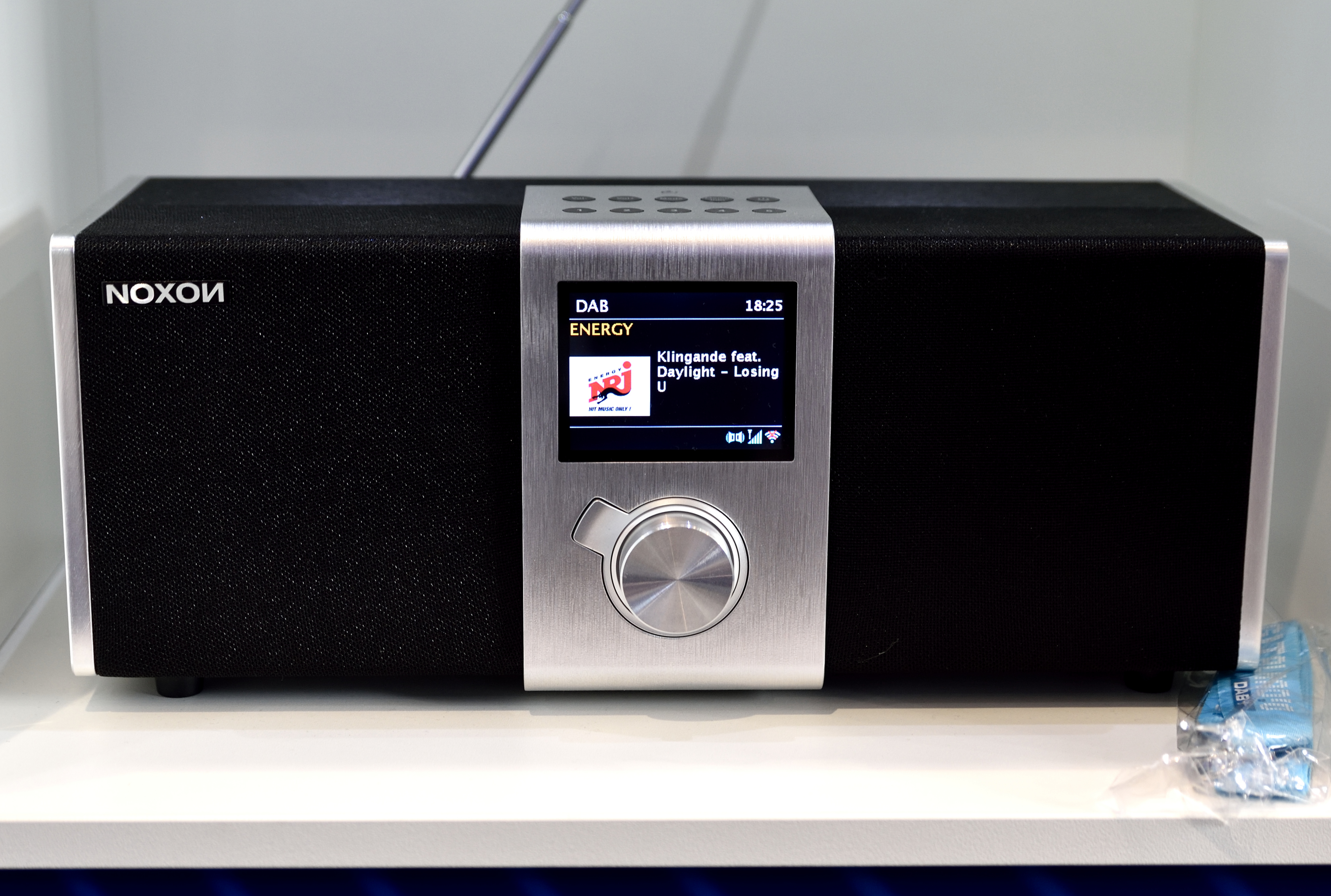
Losing U playing on NRJ (DAB+)

Year	Title	Peak chart positions													Certifications	Album
Year	Title	FRA	AUS	AUT	BEL	DEN	FIN	GER	ITA	NLD	NOR	SWE	SWI	UK	Certifications	Album
2013	"Punga"	86	—	62	24	—	—	59	—	—	—	—	41	—		Non-album singles
2013	"Jubel"	5	3	1	1	8	5	1	1	9	2	3	1	3	ARIA: 3× Platinum; BEA: Gold; BVMI: 2× Platinum; FIMI: 5× Platinum; IFPI NOR: 4× Platinum; GLF: 3× Platinum; IFPI SWI: Platinum	Non-album singles
2015	"Riva (Restart the Game)"	144	56	13	69	—	—	9	19	—	36	—	6	—	FIMI: Gold	Non-album singles
2016	"Losing U"	—	—	—	88	—	—	—	64	—	—	—	—	—	FIMI: Gold	Non-album singles
2016	"Somewhere New" (featuring M-22)	—	—	—	—	—	—	—	100	—	—	35	—	—	FIMI: Gold	Non-album singles
2017	"Pumped Up"	—	—	—	82	—	—	—	—	—	22	71	—	—	FIMI: Gold	Non-album singles
2018	"Hope for Tomorrow" (with Autograf and Dragonette)	—	—	—	—	—	—	—	—	—	—	—	—	—		Non-album singles
2018	"Rebel Yell" (with Krishane)	—	—	—	—	—	—	—	—	—	—	— (Note: "Rebel Yell" did not enter the Swedish Singellista Chart, but peaked at number 12 on the Swedish Heatseeker Chart.)	—	—		Non-album singles
2018	"Wonders" (with Broken Back)	—	—	—	—	—	—	—	—	—	—	—	—	—		Non-album singles
2019	"By the River" (with Jamie N Commons)	—	—	—	—	—	—	—	—	—	—	—	—	—		The Album
2019	"Ready for Love" (with Joe Killington featuring Greg Zlap)	—	—	—	—	—	—	—	—	—	—	—	—	—		The Album
2019	"Messiah" (with Bright Sparks)	—	—	—	—	—	—	—	—	—	—	—	—	—		The Album
2021	"Better Man" (featuring Rogelio Douglas Jr.)	—	—	—	—	—	—	—	—	—	—	—	—	—		Non-album singles
2022	"Planet In The Sky" (with Merk & Kremont featuring Mkla)	—	—	—	—	—	—	—	—	—	—	—	—	—		Non-album singles
2023	"Kids on the Run" (with Vargen)	—	—	—	—	—	—	—	—	—	—	—	—	—		Non-album singles
"—" denotes a single that did not chart or was not released in that territory.

== Awards and nominations ==
Year	Awards	Category	Recipient	Outcome	Ref
2016	NRJ Music Awards	Best French DJ	Klingande	Nominated	
