= Blame It on the Double =

2020 song by Cory Marks

Single by Cory Marks

from the album Who I Am
- Released: January 30, 2020 (Note: The track was officially sent to German and British rock radio as a single on October 5, 2020.)
- Genre: Country rock
- Length: 3:27
- Label: Better Noise
- Songwriters: Cory Marks; Kevin Churko; Kane Churko
- Producers: Kevin Churko; Kane Churko

Cory Marks singles chronology
"Drive" (2020)	"Blame It on the Double" (2020)	"Burn It Up" (2022)

Music video
- "Blame It on the Double" on YouTube

"Blame It on the Double" is a song co-written and recorded by Canadian country rock artist Cory Marks. It was a promotional single from Marks' studio album Who I Am, and later became a single at German and British rock radio. The track was co-written by Kevin Churko and Kane Churko.

== Background ==
Marks co-wrote the song with his producers Kevin Churko and Kane Churko in 2015. He referred to it as a "country/rock small town party anthem".

== Critical reception ==
"Blame It on the Double" was named Top Country "Pick of the Week" for February 14, 2020, with the outlet saying it "has a fresh country sound with a signature rock feel".

== Music video ==
The official music video for "Blame It on the Double" premiered on February 14, 2020.

== Collaborative version ==
"Blame It on the Double"

Single by Cory Marks featuring Tyler Connolly & Jason Hook
- Released: April 30, 2021 (Note: The track was officially sent to Canadian rock radio as a single on May 14, 2021.)
- Genre: Hard rock
- Length: 3:27
- Label: Better Noise
- Songwriters: Cory Marks; Kevin Churko; Kane Churko
- Producers: Kevin Churko; Kane Churko

Music video
- "Blame It on the Double" on YouTube

"Blame It on the Double - Country Mix"

Single by Cory Marks featuring Tyler Connolly

from the EP Nashville Mornings
- Released: July 16, 2021
- Genre: Outlaw country
- Length: 3:09
- Label: Better Noise
- Songwriters: Cory Marks; Kevin Churko; Kane Churko
- Producers: Kevin Churko; Kane Churko

Music video
- "Blame It on the Double - Country Mix" on YouTube

A new version of the song was released in April 2021, featuring Tyler Connolly, lead vocalist of Canadian rock band Theory of a Deadman, and Jason Hook, former lead guitarist of Five Finger Death Punch. This version of the track will be featured on the 2021 film The Retaliators.

=== Background ===
Marks decided to release a new version of "Blame It on the Double" because he felt it "needed to be heard". He cited Merle Haggard, Waylon Jennings, Pantera, and Ozzy Osbourne as both country and rock influences reflected in this song, and said that adding Tyler Connolly and Jason Hook to the track gave it "epic rock energy". Connolly said he "jumped at the chance" when asked to be on the track, calling Marks the "future of outlaw country music". Hook stated he was "honoured to be asked to contribute" and called Marks and co-writer / producer Kevin Churko "dear friends".

=== Critical reception ===
Dave Brooks of Billboard said the track "reflects on all the freedoms that come with the loss of control during a night out on the town". Chris Parton of Sounds Like Nashville called the song an "aggressive hard-rock anthem" noting "crunchy guitars and pounding drums with lyrics that nod to country greats". Kerry Doole of FYI Music News labelled the new version a "rockin' remake" of the original track.

=== Music video ===
The official music video for the second version of "Blame It on the Double" was filmed at a drive-in theatre in Los Angeles, California, and premiered on April 30, 2021. It features Marks, Connolly, and Hook, and integrates footage from the film The Retaliators as well.

== Country Mix ==
Marks included a new "Country Mix" of the song on his extended play Nashville Mornings in June 2021. This version of the song was sent to Canadian country radio.

=== Music video ===
The official music video for the "Blame It on the Double - Country Mix" premiered on July 2, 2021. The video features Marks and Connolly each recording their own parts of the song whilst having fun in the process.

== Awards and nominations ==
Year	Association	Category	Nominated work	Result	Ref
2022	Country Music Association of Ontario	Songwriter(s) of the Year	"Blame It on the Double" (with Kevin Churko and Kane Churko)	Nominated	
