= List of Razor & Tie artists =

The following is an incomplete list of artists who have released records on Razor & Tie and Razor & Tie imprints since the label was founded in 1990.

== Former Razor & Tie artists ==
- 16 Horsepower
- 40 Below Summer
- Adestria
- Al Stewart and Shot in the Dark
- Alex Chilton
- Andy McKee
- Angelique Kidjo
- Attila (independent)
- Bad Books
- Barbara Mandrell
- BeBe Winans
- Blood Youth
- The Bongos
- Born Cages
- Brad
- Brand New
- A Bullet for Pretty Boy (Artery Recordings)
- Bury Tomorrow (Nuclear Blast Records)
- Capture the Crown
- Casino Madrid (Artery Recordings)
- César Velázquez
- Chelsea Grin (Rise Records)
- Cher Lloyd (Malaysia and Thailand)
- Chiodos (disbanded)
- The Clarks
- Close to Home (disbanded)
- Cledus T. Judd
- Corey Smith
- The Crimson Armada (disbanded)
- Crystal Lake
- The Dan Band
- Danko Jones
- Dar Williams
- Dave Barnes
- Dave Stewart
- Day of Fire
- Dead Confederate
- Deaf Havana
- Death of an Era
- Dee Snider
- Defiler
- Devin the Dude
- DIVISIONS
- Don Johnson
- Donnie Iris
- Early Seasons
- Elliott Murphy
- Emerson, Lake and Palmer (U.S. and Canada)
- Endeverafter
- Entheos
- Enterprise Earth (Stay Sick)
- Finch
- For the Win
- For Today
- Four Letter Lie
- Fronzilla
- Gary U.S. Bonds
- The Graduate
- Graham Parker
- Hearts & Hands
- Hit the Lights
- Horseneck
- Hoods
- Joe Grushecky
- Hatebreed (Nuclear Blast Records)
- I Am War
- I Declare War
- INVSN
- It Lives, It Breathes (Stay Sick)
- Ivory Joe Hunter
- The Jingle Punks Hipster Orchestra
- Joan Baez
- Joe Jackson
- John Lithgow
- Jon McLaughlin
- Jules Shear
- Just Surrender
- Kelly Sweet
- Kevin Devine
- Kublai Khan
- Kyng
- Ladysmith Black Mambazo
- Laurie Berkner
- Little Steven
- Love Tractor
- Madina Lake
- Man Made Machine
- Marshall Crenshaw
- Mathias Anderle
- Melinda Watts
- Message to the Masses
- Michael Londra
- Neil Sedaka
- Nicole Atkins
- The Nields
- Nikolai Baskov
- Nonpoint
- Norma Jean (Solid State Records)
- Ocean is Theory
- Old Again (Stay Sick)
- Phillip LaRue
- Phinehas
- The Plot in You (Stay Sick)
- P.O.D.
- Prince Paul
- Protest the Hero
- The Ready Set
- Richard Ashcroft
- Rick Springfield
- Ryan Shaw
- Saves the Day
- The Seeking
- Selena Gomez
- Semi Precious Weapons
- Seven Nations
- Slumber Party Girls
- Shadows Fall
- Shoot the Girl First
- Silent Screams
- Simon Collins
- Sirens & Sailors
- Slaves
- Sonia Dada
- Spoken
- Steve Hofstetter
- Stevie T.
- Such Gold
- The Summer Set
- Suzanne Vega
- Sworn In (Fearless Records)
- Sylar (Hopeless Records)
- Tina Sugandh
- Upon This Dawning
- Vanessa Carlton
- Vanna (Pure Noise Records)
- While She Sleeps (SharpTone Records)
- White Fox Society
- Wildways
- Will Heaven
- Willie Nile
- Wounds
- Yellowcard
- Zappa Plays Zappa
- Zendaya

== Razor & Tie artists (2016-late 2010s) ==
- All That Remains
- Boonyi
- Choo Choo Soul
- Austin Plaine (Washington Square)
- Devour the Day
- Failure Anthem
- HIM
- Holy White Hounds
- Kegan Kline
- Kidz Bop
- Kyng
- The Low Anthem (Washington Square)
- MAGIC GIANT (Washington Square)
- MOTHXR (Washington Square)
- Mount Holly
- My Jerusalem (Washington Square)
- Myka Relocate
- The New Low
- The Pretty Reckless (Fearless Records)
- Red Sun Rising
- Sons of Texas
- Soren Bryce (Washington Square)
- STARSET
- The Sword
- The Vapors
- The Wiggles
- Wilson
