= First World problem (disambiguation) =

First World problem is an informal term for issues in First World nations that are complained about only because of the absence of more pressing concerns.

First World problem and First World problems may also refer to:

- A satirical image macro featuring a crying woman (Silvia Bottini)
- First World Problems (album), an album by Failure Anthem
- "First World Problems" (song), a song by Weird Al Yankovic on the album Mandatory Fun
- "First World Problem", a song by MC Frontalot on the album Zero Day
- "First World Problem", a single by Unknown Mortal Orchestra
- "First World Problems", a song by Ian Brown on the album Ripples
