= Witch (In This Moment album) =

Studio album by In This Moment
- Released: August 28, 2026
- Length: 49:48
- Label: Better Noise
- Producers: Kane Churko; Kile Odell; Drew Fulk

In This Moment chronology
Godmode (2023)	Witch (2026)

Singles from Witch
- 1. "Heretic" Released: July 15, 2025; 2. "Sleeping with the Enemy" Released: May 29, 2026; 3. "Crawl" Released: July 17, 2026; 4. "I Want to Believe" Released: August 28, 2026

Professional ratings
Review scores
Source	Rating
Blabbermouth.net	9/10
Distorted Sound	6/10
Kerrang!	4/5

Witch is the ninth studio album by the American rock band In This Moment. The album was released on August 28, 2026, through Better Noise Music, their first with the label. The album was preceded by four singles: "Heretic", "Sleeping with the Enemy", "Crawl", and "I Want to Believe".

== Background ==
Discussing the meaning of the album, vocalist Maria Brink stated:

"Witch is my declaration of inner transformation,” Brink adds of the album arc. “It's about embracing the duality within — taking pain, persecution, and struggle — and alchemizing them into strength and power. The album reflects both ancient trials and my own journey — where being a 'witch' means being a creator, connected to the universe, manifesting my own reality."

== Promotion ==
On July 15, 2025, the band released a song titled "Heretic" featuring Australian singer and musician Kim Dracula. On May 29, 2026, the band released a song titled "Sleeping With the Enemy". On July 17, 2026, the band announced the album, with a release date of August 28, 2026. It is the band's first album to be released under Better Noise Music. The album's third single, "Crawl", was released the same day as the album announcement. After the album's release, the band will co-headline the revived Taste of Chaos tour with Hollywood Undead. The first show is scheduled for September 22, 2026 in Charlotte, North Carolina.

== Track listing ==
Witch track listing
No.	Title	Writer(s)	Length
1.	"Shame"	Maria Brink; Chris Howorth; Drew Fulk	4:21
2.	"I Want to Believe" (featuring Dayseeker)	Brink; Howorth; Kane Churko	4:41
3.	"Crawl"	Brink; Howorth; Fulk	3:51
4.	"Into the Dark"	Brink; Howorth; Churko	4:31
5.	"Sleeping with the Enemy"	Brink; Howorth; Fulk	4:06
6.	"Wrapped Around Your Finger"	Sting	4:50
7.	"Heretic" (featuring Kim Dracula)	Brink; Howorth; Kent Diimmel; Travis Johnson; Randy Weitzel; Churko; Samuel Wellings	3:03
8.	"Father"	Brink; Howorth; Churko	4:48
9.	"Without Me There's No You"	Brink; Howorth; Churko	4:44
10.	"Another Brick in the Wall" (featuring Kat Von D)	Roger Waters	3:55
11.	"Something I Can Never Have"	Trent Reznor	6:58
Total length:			49:48

== Personnel ==
Credits are adapted from Tidal.

=== In This Moment ===
- Maria Brink – performance, co-production
- Kent Diimmel – performance, programming
- Chris Howorth – performance, co-production
- Travis Johnson – performance, vocal engineering
- Randy Weitzel – performance, engineering

=== Additional contributors ===
- Kile Odell – production, mixing (tracks 1, 3, 5); engineering (all tracks)
- Drew Fulk – production, mixing (1, 3, 5)
- Kane Churko – production, engineering, mixing, mastering (2, 4, 6–11)
- Brett Portzer – engineering assistance
- Rory Rodriguez – vocals (2)

== Charts ==
Chart performance for Witch
Chart (2026)	Peak position
Australian Albums (ARIA)	93
French Physical Albums (SNEP)	176
French Rock & Metal Albums (SNEP)	74
UK Album Downloads (Official Charts)	26
UK Independent Albums (Official Charts)	34
UK Rock & Metal Albums (Official Charts)	13
US Top Album Sales (Billboard)	32
