= Paralysed (disambiguation) =

Paralysed or paralyzed may refer to:

- the state of paralysis, the complete loss of muscle function for one or more muscle groups

== Music ==
=== Albums ===
- Paralyzed (album), a 2008 album by Witch

=== Songs ===
- "Paralyzed" (Delta Goodrem song), 2020
- "Paralyzed" (Elvis Presley song), 1956
- "Paralyzed" (Sueco song), 2021
- "Paralyzed", by Agnes Monica from Agnes Is My Name, 2011
- "Paralyzed", by Big Time Rush from Elevate, 2011
- "Paralyzed", by the Cardigans from Gran Turismo, 1998
- "Paralyzed", by David Archuleta from Therapy Sessions, 2020
- "Paralyzed", by Failure Anthem from First World Problems, 2016
- "Paralysed", by Gang of Four from Solid Gold, 1981
- "Paralyzed", by Hardline from II, 2002
- "Paralyzed", by Legendary Stardust Cowboy, 1968
- "Paralyzed", by Marshmello from Joytime II, 2018
- "Paralyzed", by NF from Mansion, 2015
- "Paralysed", by Nilüfer Yanya from Miss Universe, 2019
- "Paralysed", by Ride from Nowhere, 1990
- "Paralyzed", by Rock Kills Kid from Are You Nervous?, 2006
- "Paralyzed", by Sixpence None the Richer from Divine Discontent, 2002
- "Paralysed", by Suzi Quatro from Your Mamma Won't Like Me, 1975
- "Paralyzed", by Ted Nugent from State of Shock, 1979
- "Paralysed", by Travis from Everything at Once, 2016
- "Paralyzed", by the Used from Lies for the Liars, 2007

== See also ==
- "Paralyze", song by Tila Tequila, 2008
- Paralysis (disambiguation)
- Paralyzer (disambiguation)
