= Chicago Open Air =

Rock concert in Illinois, US

- Chicago Open Air 2016 Lineup
- Genre: Heavy metal, hard rock, thrash metal, death metal, nu metal, punk rock, metalcore
- Dates: First concert: July 15–17, 2016 Second Concert: July 14-16, 2017 Third Concert May 18-19, 2019
- Locations: Bridgeview, Illinois
- Years active: 2016–2017, 2019
- Website: Chicago Open Air website

Chicago Open Air was an annual concert held in Bridgeview, Illinois that featured several rock and metal acts. Beginning in 2016, the festival got a lot of recognition as it was Rammstein's only US performance that year. It is held at Toyota Park. Korn debuted the new single "Rotting in Vain" on July 16, 2016 at Chicago Open Air.

The first concert was held from July 14 to July 17, 2016. The 2018 festival was cancelled, but the festival returned in 2019. It was announced via email in late 2019 that the festival was on hiatus for 2020.

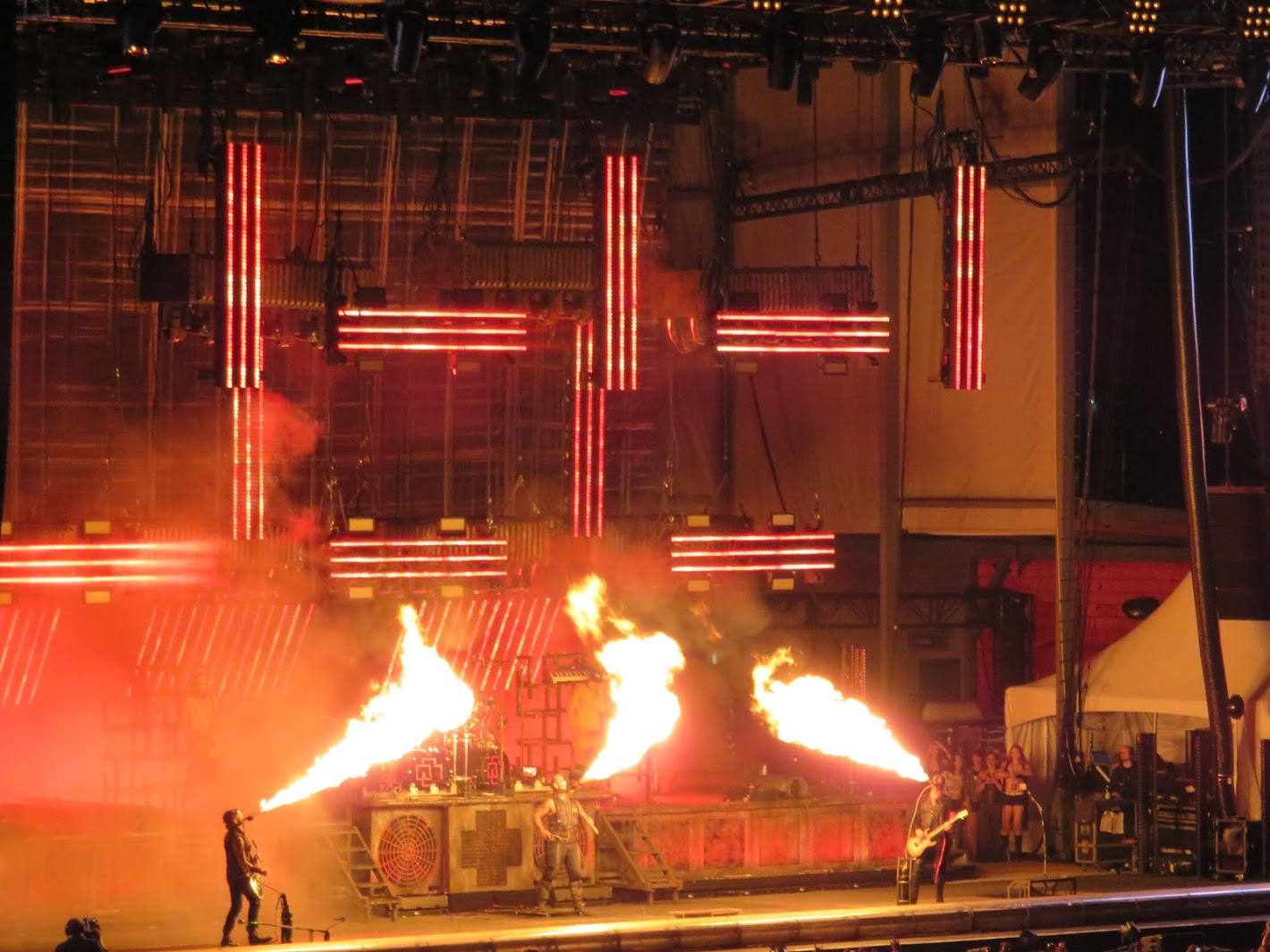
Rammstein Performance at Chicago Open Air 2016

== Chicago Open Air 2016 ==
Pre-Party (Thursday, July 14)

- Otep
- Shaman's Harvest
- Islander
- Through Fire

Day one (Friday, July 15)

Main Stage:

- Rammstein
- Chevelle
- Ministry
- Of Mice & Men
- In This Moment
- Hollywood Undead
- Trivium

Second Stage:

- Meshuggah
- The Devil Wears Prada
- Hatebreed
- Periphery
- Drowning Pool
- Butcher Babies
- Through Fire

Day two (Saturday, July 16)

Main Stage:

- Disturbed
- Korn
- Breaking Benjamin
- Alter Bridge
- Pop Evil
- Helmet
- Nothing More
- Saint Asonia

Second Stage:

- Gojira
- Deafheaven
- Carcass
- Miss May I
- Beartooth
- Silver Snakes
- City of the Weak

Day three (Sunday, July 17)

Main Stage:

- Slipknot
- Five Finger Death Punch
- Marilyn Manson
- Bullet for My Valentine
- Asking Alexandria (canceled)
- All That Remains
- Jim Breuer & The Loud & Rowdy

Second Stage:

- Killswitch Engage
- Babymetal
- Corrosion of Conformity
- Letlive
- We Came as Romans
- Upon a Burning Body
- Gemini Syndrome

== Chicago Open Air 2017 ==
Day one (Friday, July 14)

- Kiss
- Rob Zombie
- Megadeth
- Anthrax
- Meshuggah
- The Dillinger Escape Plan
- Falling in Reverse
- Vimic
- Suicide Silence
- Whitechapel
- Crobot
- Code Orange
- Hell or Highwater
- Failure Anthem

Day two (Saturday, July 15)

- Korn
- Godsmack
- Seether
- Clutch
- Steel Panther
- Body Count
- Avatar
- Mushroomhead
- Metal Church
- Pig Destroyer
- DragonForce
- Cane Hill
- Night Verses
- Black Map

Day three (Sunday, July 16)

- Ozzy Osbourne
- Slayer
- Stone Sour
- Lamb of God
- Amon Amarth
- Behemoth
- Hellyeah
- Demon Hunter
- DevilDriver
- Kyng
- Norma Jean
- Whores
- Ded

== Chicago Open Air 2019 ==
Day one (Saturday, May 18)

- System of a Down
- Ghost
- Meshuggah
- Beartooth
- Code Orange
- Knocked Loose
- Vein

Note: Vein, Knocked Loose, and Code Orange did not play due to severe weather.

Day two (Sunday, May 19)

- Tool
- The Cult
- Gojira
- In This Moment
- Fever 333
- The Black Dahlia Murder
- Alien Weaponry
