= School of thought (disambiguation) =

A school of thought is the perspective of a group of people who share common characteristics of opinion or outlook.

School of thought may also refer to:

- Schools of economic thought, a group of economic thinkers who share or shared a common perspective on the way economies work
- Hundred Schools of Thought, Chinese philosophies and schools that flourished from the 6th century BC to 221 BC
- Anarchist schools of thought
- Marxist schools of thought
- Perspectives on capitalism by school of thought
- School of Thought (album), a 2021 album by Ded
