= Developed country =

Country with a developed economy and infrastructure

Comparison of countries by their level of development (seven criteria: HDI, WESP, WB, DAC, IMF, Paris Club, UNIDO) 5+ criteria 4 criteria 3 criteria 2 criteria 1 criterion

A developed country, or advanced country, is a country that has a high quality of life, developed economy, and advanced technological infrastructure relative to other less industrialized nations. Most commonly, the criteria for evaluating the degree of economic development are: gross domestic product (GDP), gross national income (GNI), per capita income, level of industrialization, amount of widespread infrastructure and general standard of living. Which criteria are to be used and which countries can be classified as being developed are subjects of debate. Different definitions of developed countries are provided by the United Nations Department of Economic and Social Affairs (UNDESA), the World Bank, the Development Assistance Committee (DAC), the International Monetary Fund (IMF), the Paris Club and the United Nations Industrial Development Organization (UNIDO), while the Human Development Index is used to rank countries on the composite basis of life expectancy, education, and income per capita.

They are contrasted with developing countries, which are in the process of industrialisation or are pre-industrial and almost entirely agrarian, some of which might fall into the category of least developed countries. As of 2023, advanced economies constitute 57.3% of global GDP based on nominal value and 41.1% of global GDP based on purchasing power parity (PPP) according to the IMF.

== Definition and criteria ==
Economic criteria have tended to dominate discussions. One such criterion is the income per capita; countries with the high gross domestic product (GDP) per capita would thus be described as developed countries. Another economic criterion is industrialisation. More recently, another measure, the Human Development Index (HDI), which combines an economic measure, national income, with other measures, indices for life expectancy and education has become prominent. This criterion would define developed countries as those with a very high (HDI) rating. The index, however, does not take into account several factors, such as the net wealth per capita or the relative quality of goods in a country. This situation tends to lower the ranking of some of the most advanced countries, such as the G7 members and others.

According to the United Nations Statistics Division:

There is no established convention for the designation of "developed" and "developing" countries or areas in the United Nations system.

And it notes that:

The designations "developed" and "developing" are intended for statistical convenience and do not necessarily express a judgement about the stage reached by a particular country or area in the development process.

Nevertheless, the UN Conference on Trade and Development (UNCTAD) considers that this categorization can continue to be applied:

The developed economies broadly comprise Northern America and Europe, Israel, Japan, the Republic of Korea, Australia, and New Zealand.

=== Similar terms ===
Terms linked to the concept developed country include "advanced country", "industrialized country", "more developed country" (MDC), "more economically developed country" (MEDC), "Global North country", "first world country", and "post-industrial country". The term industrialized country may be somewhat ambiguous, as industrialisation is an ongoing process that is hard to define. The first industrialized country was the United Kingdom, followed by Belgium. Later it spread further to Germany, United States, France and other Western European countries. According to some economists such as Jeffrey Sachs, however, the current divide between the developed and developing world is largely a phenomenon of the 20th century.

Mathis Wackernagel calls the binary labeling of countries as "neither descriptive nor explanatory. It is merely a thoughtless and destructive endorsement of GDP fetish. In reality, there are not two types of countries, but over 200 countries, all faced with the same laws of nature, yet each with unique features."

A 2021 analysis proposes the term emerged to describe markets, economies, or countries that have graduated from emerging market status, but have not yet reached the level equivalent to developed countries. Multinational corporations from these emerging markets present unique patterns of overseas expansion and knowledge acquisition from foreign countries.

== Economy lists by various criteria ==
=== Human Development Index (HDI) ===
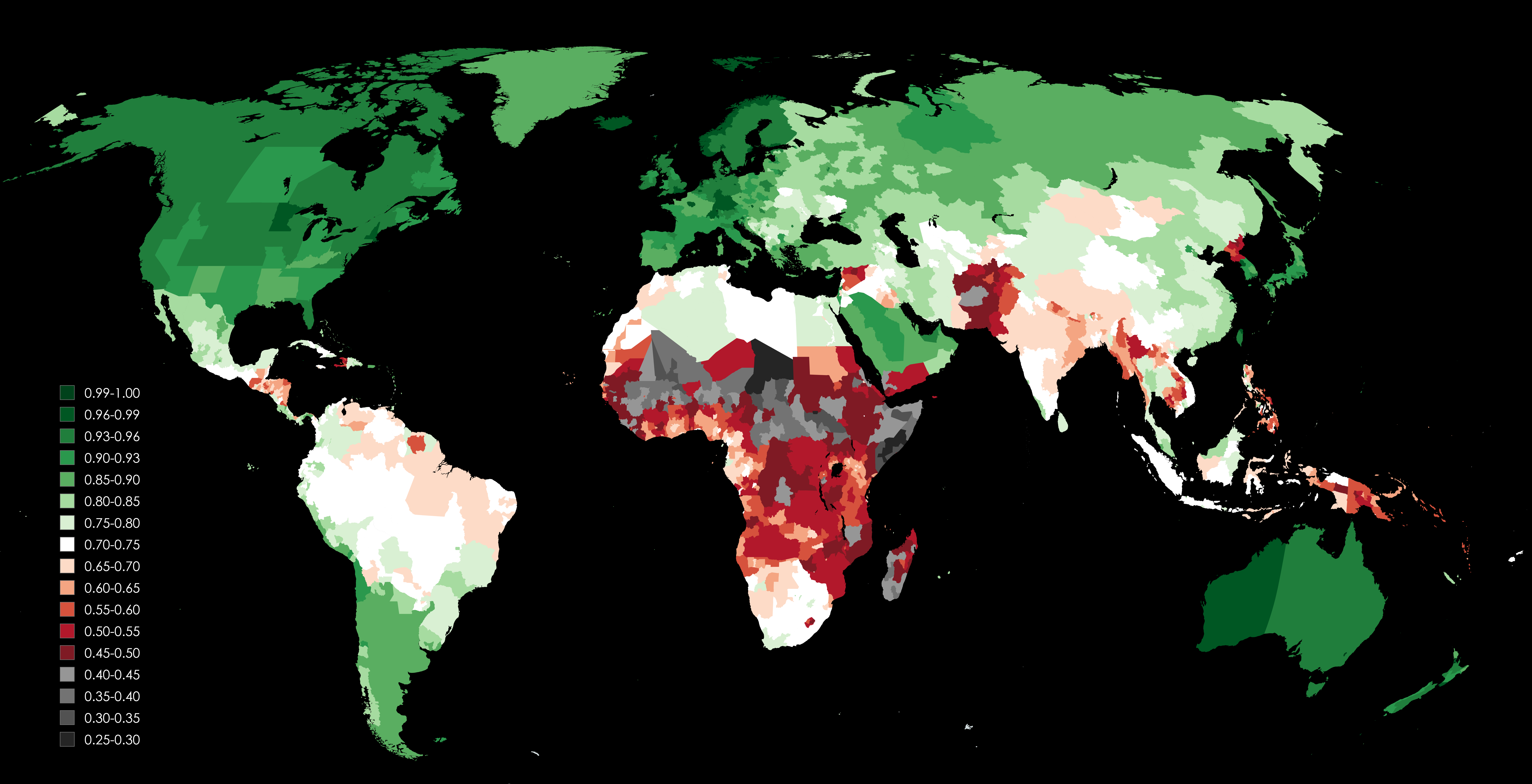
Subnational HDI in 2023 to 2025

The world map representing Human Development Index categories (based on 2023 data, published in 2025): Very high; High; Medium; Low; No data

World map of countries or territories by Human Development Index scores in increments of 0.050 (based on 2023 data, published in 2025): ≥ 0.950; 0.900–0.950; 0.850–0.899; 0.800–0.849; 0.750–0.799; 0.700–0.749; 0.650–0.699; 0.600–0.649; 0.550–0.599; 0.500–0.549; 0.450–0.499; 0.400–0.449; ≤ 0.399; Data unavailable

The UN HDI is a statistical measure that gauges an economy's level of human development. While there is a strong correlation between having a high HDI score and being a prosperous economy, the UN points out that the HDI accounts for more than income or productivity. Unlike GDP per capita or per capita income, the HDI takes into account how income is turned "into education and health opportunities and therefore into higher levels of human development."

Since 1990, Norway (2001–2006, 2009–2019), Japan (1990–1991 and 1993), Canada (1992 and 1994–2000) and Iceland (2007–2008) have had the highest HDI score.

The following countries in the year 2023 are considered to be of "very high human development":

Human Development Index by country
Rank	Δ	Country or territory	HDI value	% annual growth (2010–2023)
1	▲2	Iceland	0.972	▲0.28%
2	▼ (1)	Norway	0.970	▲0.25%
2	Steady	Switzerland	0.970	▲0.24%
4	▲ (2)	Denmark	0.962	▲0.35%
5	▼ (1)	Germany	0.959	▲0.19%
5	Steady	Sweden	0.959	▲0.38%
7	▲ (1)	Australia	0.958	▲0.20%
8	▲ (2)	Netherlands	0.955	▲0.26%
8	▼ (1)	Hong Kong	0.955	▲0.38%
10	▲ (3)	Belgium	0.951	▲0.26%
11	▲ (4)	Ireland	0.949	▲0.38%
12	▼ (4)	Finland	0.948	▲0.27%
13	▼ (2)	Singapore	0.946	▲0.25%
13	▲ (2)	United Kingdom	0.946	▲0.24%
15	▲ (27)	United Arab Emirates	0.940	▲1.04%
16	▼ (2)	Canada	0.939	▲0.22%
17	▲ (1)	Liechtenstein	0.938	▲0.23%
17	▼ (5)	New Zealand	0.938	▲0.13%
17	Steady	United States	0.938	▲0.10%
20	▲ (1)	South Korea	0.937	▲0.36%
21	▲ (2)	Slovenia	0.931	▲0.33%
22	▼ (3)	Austria	0.930	▲0.21%
23	▼ (3)	Japan	0.925	▲0.16%
24	▲ (5)	Malta	0.924	▲0.50%
25	▼ (3)	Luxembourg	0.922	▲0.14%
26	▼ (1)	France	0.920	▲0.28%
27	▼ (3)	Israel	0.919	▲0.26%
28	Steady	Spain	0.918	▲0.40%
29	▼ (3)	Czechia	0.915	▲0.22%
29	▲ (1)	Italy	0.915	▲0.24%
29	▼ (2)	San Marino	0.915	▼0.32%
32	▲ (3)	Cyprus	0.913	▲0.45%
32	▲ (1)	Andorra	0.913	▲0.20%
34	▼ (3)	Greece	0.908	▲0.18%
35	▼ (1)	Poland	0.906	▲0.35%
36	▼ (5)	Estonia	0.905	▲0.33%
37	▲ (9)	Saudi Arabia	0.900	▲0.70%
38	▼ (1)	Bahrain	0.899	▲0.80%
39	▼ (4)	Lithuania	0.895	▲0.32%
40	▲ (2)	Portugal	0.890	▲0.42%
41	▲ (4)	Latvia	0.889	▲0.51%
41	▼ (1)	Croatia	0.889	▲0.53%
43	▼ (4)	Qatar	0.886	▲0.45%
44	▼ (6)	Slovakia	0.880	▲0.14%
45	▼ (1)	Chile	0.878	▲0.47%
46	▲ (1)	Hungary	0.870	▲0.22%
47	▼ (7)	Argentina	0.865	▲0.15%
48	Steady	Montenegro	0.862	▲0.38%
48	▲ (13)	Uruguay	0.862	▲0.47%
50	▲ (1)	Oman	0.858	▲0.22%
51	▲ (7)	Turkey	0.853	▲1.10%
52	▲ (1)	Kuwait	0.852	▲0.36%
53	▼ (5)	Antigua and Barbuda	0.851	▲0.18%
54	▲ (5)	Seychelles	0.848	▲0.30%
55	▲ (1)	Bulgaria	0.845	▲0.09%
55	▲ (2)	Romania	0.845	▲0.14%
57	▲ (6)	Georgia	0.844	▲0.54%
58	▼ (4)	Saint Kitts and Nevis	0.840	▲0.49%
59	▲ (6)	Panama	0.839	▲0.47%
60	▼ (12)	Brunei	0.837	▲0.13%
60	▼ (1)	Kazakhstan	0.837	▲0.38%
62	▲ (3)	Costa Rica	0.833	▲0.39%
62	▲ (5)	Serbia	0.833	▲0.39%
64	▼ (12)	Russia	0.832	▲0.25%
65	▼ (10)	Belarus	0.824	▲0.12%
66	▼ (3)	Bahamas	0.820	▲0.21%
67	▲ (2)	Malaysia	0.819	▲0.41%
68	▲ (4)	North Macedonia	0.815	▲0.21%
69	▲ (9)	Barbados	0.811	▲0.18%
69	Steady	Armenia	0.811	▲0.52%
71	Steady	Albania	0.810	▲0.25%
72	▼ (10)	Trinidad and Tobago	0.807	▲0.30%
73	Steady	Mauritius	0.806	▲0.44%
74	▲ (7)	Bosnia and Herzegovina	0.804	▲0.68%

=== WESP developed economies ===
Countries classified as developed economies by UNDESA's World Economic Situation and Prospects report.

According to the World Economic Situation and Prospects report by the United Nations Department of Economic and Social Affairs (UNDESA), the following 37 countries are classified as "developed economies" as of January 2026:

31 countries in Europe:

- Austria
- Belgium
- Bulgaria
- Croatia
- Cyprus
- Czechia
- Denmark
- Estonia
- Finland
- France
- Germany
- Greece
- Hungary
- Iceland
- Ireland
- Italy
- Latvia
- Lithuania
- Luxembourg
- Malta
- Netherlands
- Norway
- Poland
- Portugal
- Romania
- Slovakia
- Slovenia
- Spain
- Sweden
- Switzerland
- United Kingdom

two countries in North America:

- Canada
- United States

two countries in Asia:

- Japan
- South Korea

two countries in Oceania:

- Australia
- New Zealand

=== World Bank high-income economies ===
Map of world economies based on the World Bank income classification for the 2026 fiscal year.

According to the World Bank, the following sovereign states and territories across are classified as "high-income economies", having a nominal GNI per capita in excess of $13,935 as of the 2025 fiscal year:

Non-sovereign entities appear in italics.

- American Samoa
- Andorra
- Antigua and Barbuda
- Aruba
- Australia
- Austria
- Bahamas
- Bahrain
- Barbados
- Belgium
- Bermuda
- British Virgin Islands
- Brunei
- Bulgaria
- Canada
- Cayman Islands
- Channel Islands
- Chile
- Costa Rica
- Croatia
- Curaçao
- Cyprus
- Czechia
- Denmark
- Estonia
- Faroe Islands
- Finland
- France
- French Polynesia
- Germany
- Gibraltar
- Greece
- Greenland
- Guam
- Guyana
- Hong Kong
- Hungary
- Iceland
- Ireland
- Isle of Man
- Israel
- Italy
- Japan
- South Korea
- Kuwait
- Latvia
- Liechtenstein
- Lithuania
- Luxembourg
- Macau
- Malta
- Monaco
- Nauru
- Netherlands
- New Caledonia
- New Zealand
- Northern Mariana Islands
- Norway
- Oman
- Palau
- Panama
- Poland
- Portugal
- Puerto Rico
- Qatar
- Romania
- Russia
- San Marino
- Saudi Arabia
- Seychelles
- Singapore
- Sint Maarten
- Slovakia
- Slovenia
- Spain
- Saint Kitts and Nevis
- Saint Martin
- Sweden
- Switzerland
- Taiwan
- Trinidad and Tobago
- Turks and Caicos Islands
- United Arab Emirates
- United Kingdom
- United States
- Uruguay
- United States Virgin Islands

=== Development Assistance Committee members ===
Member and associate nations of the Development Assistance Committee Member nations Associates

There are 32 OECD member countries and the European Union—in the Development Assistance Committee (DAC), a group of the world's major donor countries that discusses issues surrounding development aid and poverty reduction in developing countries. The following OECD member countries are DAC members:

26 countries in Europe:

- Austria
- Belgium
- Czechia
- Denmark
- Estonia
- Finland
- France
- Germany
- Greece
- Hungary
- Iceland
- Ireland
- Italy
- Latvia
- Lithuania
- Luxembourg
- Netherlands
- Norway
- Poland
- Portugal
- Slovakia
- Slovenia
- Spain
- Sweden
- Switzerland
- United Kingdom

two countries in North America:

- Canada
- United States

two countries in Asia:

- Japan
- South Korea

two countries in Oceania:

- Australia
- New Zealand

one associate member:

- Romania

=== IMF advanced economies ===
World map of advanced economies based on the World Economic Outlook, April 2026.

According to the International Monetary Fund, 43 countries and territories are officially listed as "advanced economies", with the addition of 6 microstates and dependencies listed by the CIA but omitted from the IMF version:

31 countries in Europe classified by the IMF, two sovereign entities and three territories listed by the CIA:

- Andorra
- Austria
- Belgium
- Bulgaria
- Croatia
- Cyprus
- Czechia
- Denmark
- Estonia
- Finland
- France
- Germany
- Greece
- Iceland
- Ireland
- Italy
- Latvia
- Liechtenstein
- Lithuania
- Luxembourg
- Malta
- Netherlands
- Norway
- Portugal
- San Marino
- Slovakia
- Slovenia
- Spain
- Sweden
- Switzerland
- United Kingdom

Plus^{d}

- Faroe Islands
- Guernsey
- Holy See
- Jersey
- Monaco

five countries and two territories in Asia:

- Hong Kong
- Israel
- Japan
- South Korea
- Macau
- Singapore
- Taiwan

two countries and one territory in the Americas classified by the IMF, one territory listed by the CIA :

- Bermuda^{d}
- Canada
- Puerto Rico
- United States

two countries in Oceania:

- Australia
- New Zealand

^{d} The CIA has modified an older version of the IMF's list of advanced economies, noting that it "would presumably also cover the following nine smaller countries of Andorra, Bermuda, Faroe Islands, Guernsey, Holy See, Jersey, Liechtenstein, Monaco, and San Marino[...]". San Marino (2012), Andorra (2021) and Liechtenstein (2025) were later included in the IMF's list.

=== Paris Club members ===
Permanent members of the Paris Club

There are 22 permanent members in the Paris Club (French: Club de Paris), a group of officials from major creditor countries whose role is to find coordinated and sustainable solutions to the payment difficulties experienced by debtor countries.

15 countries in Europe:

- Austria
- Belgium
- Denmark
- Finland
- France
- Germany
- Ireland
- Italy
- Netherlands
- Norway
- Russia
- Spain
- Sweden
- Switzerland
- United Kingdom

three countries in the Americas:

- Brazil
- Canada
- United States

three countries in Asia:

- Israel
- Japan
- South Korea

one country in Oceania:

- Australia

=== UNIDO high-income industrial economies ===
World map of high-income industrial economies (HIIEs), according to UNIDO.

According to the United Nations Industrial Development Organization (UNIDO), 48 countries and one territory are categorized as "high-income industrial economies". This classification, first implemented in 2022, is assigned to economies that have achieved a high national income through a development path resulting in high levels of industrialization. UNIDO determines this status by evaluating three core dimensions of the manufacturing sector: value added (manufacturing value added per capita), historical employment share, and the quality of exports (average exports of medium- and high-technology products). Previously, UNIDO's top-tier classification of "industrialized economies" included countries that were not high-income economies, e.g. Belarus and Malaysia.

34 countries in Europe:

- Austria
- Belgium
- Bulgaria
- Croatia
- Cyprus
- Czechia
- Denmark
- Estonia
- Finland
- France
- Germany
- Greece
- Hungary
- Iceland
- Ireland
- Italy
- Latvia
- Liechtenstein
- Lithuania
- Luxembourg
- Malta
- Netherlands
- Norway
- Poland
- Portugal
- Romania
- Russia
- San Marino
- Slovakia
- Slovenia
- Spain
- Sweden
- Switzerland
- United Kingdom

six countries in Asia:

- Bahrain
- Israel
- Japan
- South Korea
- Singapore
- Taiwan

five countries and one territory in the Americas:

- Canada
- Chile
- Costa Rica
- Puerto Rico
- United States
- Uruguay

three countries in Oceania:

- Australia
- Nauru
- New Zealand

== Comparative table ==
Comparative table of countries with a "very high" human development (0.800 or higher), according to the UNDP; "developed" economies, according to the World Economic Situation and Prospects report by UNDESA; "high-income" economies, according to the World Bank; DAC members; "advanced" economies, according to the IMF; Paris Club members; and/or "high-income industrial economies", according to UNIDO.

Year of inclusion in brackets; non-sovereign entities in italics.

Country	HDI	WESP	WB	DAC	IMF	Paris Club	UNIDO
Albania	✓ (2025)	✗	✗	✗	✗	✗	✗
Andorra	✓ (2003)	✗	✓ (1990)	✗	✓ (2021)	✗	✗
Antigua and Barbuda	✓ (2007)	✗	✓ (2012)	✗	✗	✗	✗
Argentina	✓ (2006)	✗	✗	✗	✗	✗	✗
Armenia	✓ (2025)	✗	✗	✗	✗	✗	✗
Australia	✓ (1990)	✓ (19??)	✓ (1987)	✓ (1966)	✓ (1980)	✓ (????)	✓ (2022)
Austria	✓ (1992)	✓ (19??)	✓ (1987)	✓ (1965)	✓ (19??)	✓ (????)	✓ (2022)
Bahamas	✓ (2016)	✗	✓ (1987)	✗	✗	✗	✗
Bahrain	✓ (2012)	✗	✓ (2001)	✗	✗	✗	✓ (2024)
Barbados	✓ (2016)	✗	✓ (2006)	✗	✗	✗	✗
Belarus	✓ (2012)	✗	✗	✗	✗	✗	✗
Belgium	✓ (1990)	✓ (19??)	✓ (1987)	✓ (1961)	✓ (19??)	✓ (????)	✓ (2022)
Bosnia and Herzegovina	✓ (2025)	✗	✗	✗	✗	✗	✗
Brazil	✗	✗	✗	✗	✗	✓ (2017)	✗
Brunei	✓ (1999)	✗	✓ (1990)	✗	✗	✗	✗
Bulgaria	✓ (2021)	✓ (2007)	✓ (2023)	✗	✓ (2026)	✗	✓ (2025)
Canada	✓ (1990)	✓ (19??)	✓ (1987)	✓ (1961)	✓ (19??)	✓ (????)	✓ (2022)
Chile	✓ (2007)	✗	✓ (2012)	✗	✗	✗	✓ (2025)
Costa Rica	✓ (2019)	✗	✓ (2024)	✗	✗	✗	✓ (2026)
Croatia	✓ (2007)	✓ (2013)	✓ (2017)	✗	✓ (2023)	✗	✓ (2022)
Cyprus	✓ (2001)	✓ (2004)	✓ (1988)	✗	✓ (2001)	✗	✓ (2025)
Czechia	✓ (2001)	✓ (2004)	✓ (2006)	✓ (2013)	✓ (2009)	✗	✓ (2022)
Denmark	✓ (1991)	✓ (19??)	✓ (1987)	✓ (1963)	✓ (19??)	✓ (????)	✓ (2025)
Estonia	✓ (2003)	✓ (2004)	✓ (2006)	✓ (2023)	✓ (2011)	✗	✓ (2022)
Finland	✓ (1994)	✓ (19??)	✓ (1987)	✓ (1975)	✓ (1980)	✓ (????)	✓ (2022)
France	✓ (1993)	✓ (19??)	✓ (1987)	✓ (1961)	✓ (19??)	✓ (????)	✓ (2022)
Georgia	✓ (2019)	✗	✗	✗	✗	✗	✗
Germany	✓ (1990)	✓ (19??)	✓ (1987)	✓ (1961)	✓ (19??)	✓ (????)	✓ (2022)
Greece	✓ (2001)	✓ (19??)	✓ (1996)	✓ (1999)	✓ (1989)	✗	✓ (2025)
Guyana	✗	✗	✓ (2022)	✗	✗	✗	✗
Hong Kong	✓ (????)	✗	✓ (????)	✗	✓ (1997)	✗	✗
Hungary	✓ (2005)	✓ (2004)	✓ (2014)	✓ (2016)	✗	✗	✓ (2022)
Iceland	✓ (1990)	✓ (19??)	✓ (1987)	✓ (2013)	✓ (1980)	✗	✓ (2025)
Ireland	✓ (1996)	✓ (19??)	✓ (1987)	✓ (1985)	✓ (1980)	✓ (????)	✓ (2022)
Israel	✓ (1991)	✗	✓ (1987)	✗	✓ (1997)	✓ (2014)	✓ (2022)
Italy	✓ (1995)	✓ (19??)	✓ (1987)	✓ (1961)	✓ (19??)	✓ (????)	✓ (2022)
Japan	✓ (1990)	✓ (19??)	✓ (1987)	✓ (1961)	✓ (19??)	✓ (????)	✓ (2022)
Kazakhstan	✓ (2015)	✗	✗	✗	✗	✗	✗
Kuwait	✓ (2014)	✗	✓ (1987)	✗	✗	✗	✗
Latvia	✓ (2005)	✓ (2004)	✓ (2012)	✓ (2025)	✓ (2014)	✗	✓ (2022)
Liechtenstein	✓ (2000)	✗	✓ (1990)	✗	✓ (2025)	✗	✓ (2022)
Lithuania	✓ (2005)	✓ (2004)	✓ (2012)	✓ (2022)	✓ (2015)	✗	✓ (2022)
Luxembourg	✓ (1992)	✓ (19??)	✓ (1987)	✓ (1992)	✓ (19??)	✗	✓ (2022)
Macau	✗ (N/A) (Note: Not included in the United Nations Development Programme's Human Development Report.)	✗	✓ (1994)	✗	✓ (2016)	✗	✗
Malaysia	✓ (2016)	✗	✗	✗	✗	✗	✗
Malta	✓ (2003)	✓ (19??)	✓ (2002)	✗	✓ (2008)	✗	✓ (2022)
Mauritius	✓ (2025)	✗	✗	✗	✗	✗	✗
Monaco	✓ (1990)	✗	✓ (1990)	✗	✓ (2008)	✗	✗
Montenegro	✓ (2013)	✗	✗	✗	✗	✗	✗
Nauru	✗	✗	✓ (2019)	✗	✗	✗	✓ (2022)
Netherlands	✓ (1990)	✓ (19??)	✓ (1987)	✓ (1961)	✓ (19??)	✓ (????)	✓ (2022)
New Zealand	✓ (1990)	✓ (19??)	✓ (1987)	✓ (1973)	✓ (1980)	✗	✓ (2022)
North Macedonia	✓ (2025)	✗	✗	✗	✗	✗	✗
Norway	✓ (1990)	✓ (19??)	✓ (1987)	✓ (1962)	✓ (19??)	✓ (????)	✓ (2025)
Oman	✓ (2012)	✗	✓ (2007)	✗	✗	✗	✗
Palau	✗	✗	✓ (2023)	✗	✗	✗	✗
Panama	✓ (2019)	✗	✓ (2021)	✗	✗	✗	✗
Poland	✓ (2003)	✓ (2004)	✓ (2009)	✓ (2013)	✗	✗	✓ (2022)
Portugal	✓ (2005)	✓ (19??)	✓ (1994)	✓ (1991)	✓ (1989)	✗	✓ (2025)
Puerto Rico	✗ (N/A)	✗	✓ (2002)	✗	✓ (2016)	✗	✓ (2022)
Qatar	✓ (1996)	✗	✓ (1987)	✗	✗	✗	✗
Romania	✓ (2013)	✓ (2007)	✓ (2021)	✓ (2025)	✗	✗	✓ (2023)
Russia	✓ (2013)	✗	✓ (2023)	✗	✗	✓ (????)	✓ (2025)
Saint Kitts and Nevis	✓ (2011)	✗	✓ (2012)	✗	✗	✗	✗
San Marino	✓ (2021)	✗	✓ (2000)	✗	✓ (2012)	✗	✓ (2022)
Saudi Arabia	✓ (2010)	✗	✓ (2004)	✗	✗	✗	✗
Serbia	✓ (2019)	✗	✗	✗	✗	✗	✗
Seychelles	✓ (2022)	✗	✓ (2014)	✗	✗	✗	✗
Singapore	✓ (1999)	✗	✓ (1987)	✗	✓ (1997)	✗	✓ (2022)
Slovakia	✓ (2006)	✓ (2004)	✓ (2007)	✓ (2013)	✓ (2009)	✗	✓ (2022)
Slovenia	✓ (1998)	✓ (2004)	✓ (1997)	✓ (2013)	✓ (2007)	✗	✓ (2022)
South Korea	✓ (1999)	✓ (2024)	✓ (2001)	✓ (2009)	✓ (1997)	✓ (2016)	✓ (2022)
Spain	✓ (1995)	✓ (19??)	✓ (1987)	✓ (1991)	✓ (1980)	✓ (????)	✓ (2022)
Sweden	✓ (1990)	✓ (19??)	✓ (1987)	✓ (1965)	✓ (19??)	✓ (????)	✓ (2022)
Switzerland	✓ (1990)	✓ (19??)	✓ (1987)	✓ (1968)	✓ (19??)	✓ (????)	✓ (2022)
Taiwan	✓ (N/A) (Note: The Human Development Report does not include Taiwan because it is no longer a UN member state, nor is it included as part of the People's Republic of China. Taiwan's Statistical Bureau calculated its HDI to be 0.926 based on UNDP's 2010 methodology, which would place Taiwan well within the group of "very high human development" at 19th globally in 2021 within the 2022 UNDP report.)	✗	✓ (1987)	✗	✓ (1997)	✗	✓ (2022)
Trinidad and Tobago	✓ (2021)	✗	✓ (2006)	✗	✗	✗	✗
Turkey	✓ (2015)	✗	✗	✗	✗	✗	✗
United Arab Emirates	✓ (2004)	✗	✓ (1987)	✗	✗	✗	✗
United Kingdom	✓ (1992)	✓ (19??)	✓ (1987)	✓ (1961)	✓ (19??)	✓ (????)	✓ (2022)
United States	✓ (1990)	✓ (19??)	✓ (1987)	✓ (1961)	✓ (19??)	✓ (????)	✓ (2022)
Uruguay	✓ (2014)	✗	✓ (2012)	✗	✗	✗	✓ (2022)

== See also ==
- Advanced economy
- Developed market
- Developing country
- Digital divide
- D-10 Strategy Forum
- Emerging market
- First World privilege
- Globalization
- G7
- High-income economy
- List of countries by wealth per adult
- Median income
- OECD
