= Paralysis (disambiguation) =

Paralysis is the complete loss of muscle function for one or more muscle groups.

Paralysis may also refer to:

- Paralysis (album), a 2001 death metal album
- Paralysis (band), a gothic metal band
- Paralysis (novel), a Gujarati novel by Indian writer Chandrakant Bakshi

== See also ==
- Paralysed (disambiguation)
- Paralyzer (disambiguation)
