= Mis-An-Thrope =

Studio album by Ded
- Released: July 21, 2017
- Genre: Nu metal
- Length: 37:24
- Label: Suretone
- Producer: John Feldmann

Ded chronology
Mis-An-Thrope (2017)	School of Thought (2021)

Singles from Mis-An-Thrope
- 1. "FMFY" Released: December 23, 2016; 2. "Anti-Everything" Released: February 25, 2017; 3. "Dead to Me" Released: June 21, 2017; 4. "Remember the Enemy" Released: September 12, 2017; 5. "Hate Me" Released: January 25, 2018

Mis-An-Thrope is the debut studio album by American nu metal band Ded. It was released on July 21, 2017, produced by John Feldmann and published through Suretone Records. In December 2016, the group published a lyric video for their debut single "FMFY". In February 2017, the ensemble debuted a lyric video for their second single "Anti-Everything", with an official music video produced by Fred Durst released the following month.

== Track listing ==
Credits adapted from CD and iTunes.

No.	Title	Length
1.	"Architect"	3:47
2.	"Anti-Everything"	3:14
3.	"Dead to Me"	3:17
4.	"FMFY"	3:11
5.	"Remember the Enemy"	3:32
6.	"Disassociate"	2:51
7.	"Rope"	3:59
8.	"Hate Me"	3:02
9.	"I Exist"	3:07
10.	"Inside"	3:26
11.	"Beautiful"	3:57
Total length:		37:24

== Personnel ==
- Joe Cotela – lead vocals
- David Ludlow – guitar, backing vocals
- Matt Reinhard – drums
- Kyle Koelsch – bass guitar, backing vocals

== Charts ==
=== Album ===
Chart (2017)	Peak position
US Independent Albums (Billboard)	16
US Heatseekers Albums (Billboard)	3
US Top Album Sales (Billboard)	80

=== Singles ===
Title	Year	Peak chart positions	
Title	Year	US Main. Rock	US Active Rock
"FMFY"	2016	—	—
"Anti-Everything"	2017	18	20
"Dead to Me"	2017	—	—
"Remember the Enemy"	2017	21	20
"Hate Me"	2018	32	—
