= First World privilege =

Unearned advantages gained by being a national of a First World country

First World privilege is any advantages accrued by an individual by virtue of being a national of a First World country.

== Overview ==
First-World privilege is often explicitly maintained by legal means such as immigration laws and trade barriers. Further, very few nations have laws that prevent explicit discrimination on the basis of nationality for access to employment, promotions, education, scholarships, etc. Laws of many nations actively encourage the discrimination against foreign nationals, for employment and educational purposes, via stringent immigration requirements, exorbitant fees, devaluation of educational qualifications, and scholarship quotas that usually favor citizens from developed nations.

First World nations usually have mutual trade and immigration arrangements and treaties that limit the discrimination faced by First-World nationals regarding employment, education and business in other First World countries. The existence of discriminatory laws and barriers across the world, according to First World privilege theory, on balance systematically favor the employment, business, access to education and health care, and subsequently welfare of citizens of First World nations at the cost of the welfare and oppression of the people of developing nations.

In general, the term "privilege" when referring to social inequality has been criticized for not distinguishing between "spared injustice" and "unjust enrichment".

== See also ==
- Developed country
- Global North and Global South
- First World problem
