= Paralyzer (disambiguation) =

Paralyzer is a first single from Finger Eleven's fifth album.

Paralyzer or paralyser may also refer to:

- Paralyser, that which causes paralysis (the complete loss of muscle function for one or more muscle groups)
- Paralyzer, the alias of Randall Darby, a fictional mutant character
- Paralyzer, a cocktail consisting of cola, milk, coffee liqueur, and vodka, variant of a Black Russian

== See also ==
- Paralysed (disambiguation)
- Paralysis (disambiguation)
