= Ded (band) =

American nu metal band

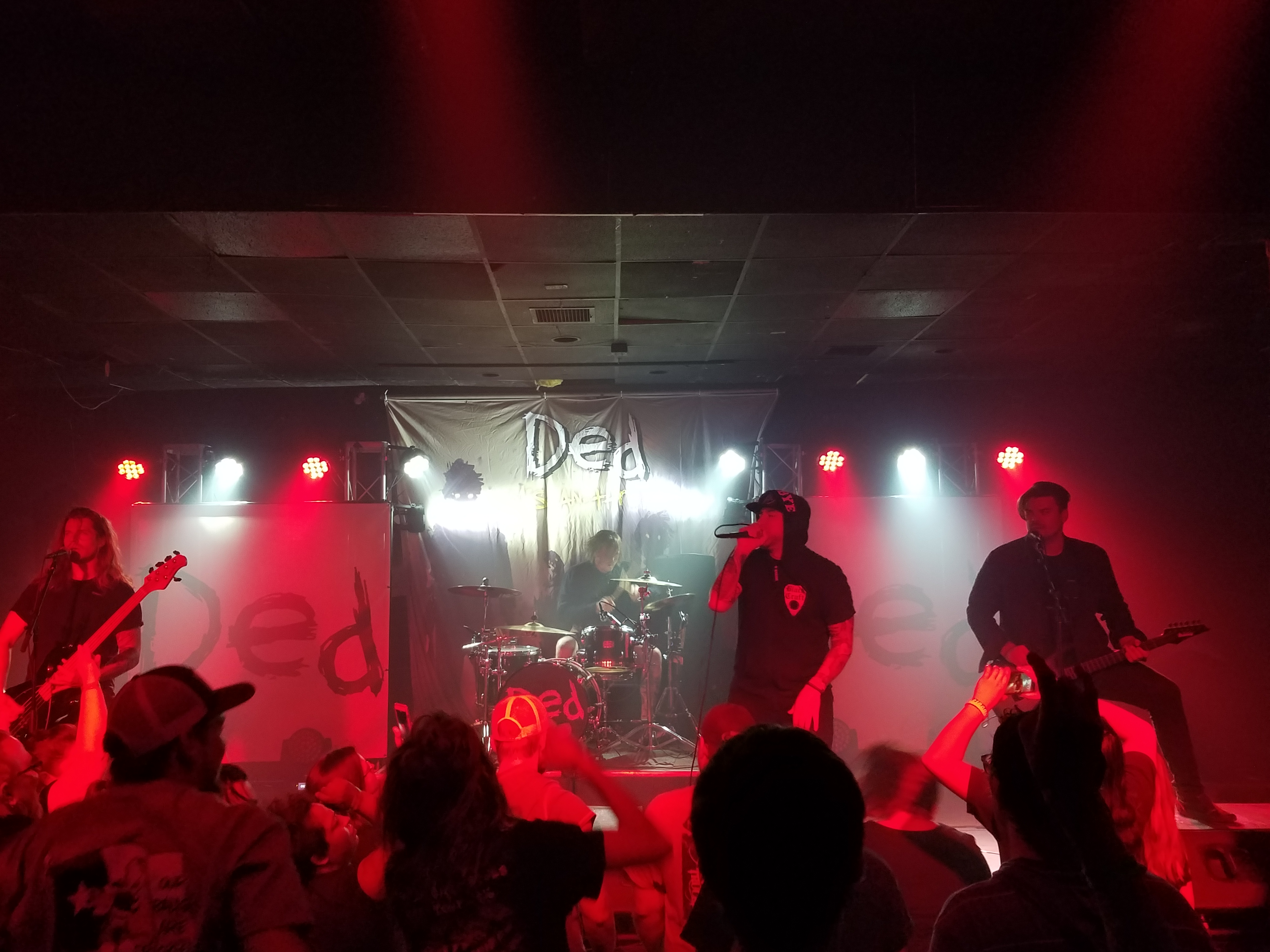
- Members of Ded performing in 2017

Background information
- Origin: Tempe, Arizona, U.S.
- Genres: Nu metal
- Years active: 2016–present
- Labels: Suretone, UNFD
- Spinoff of: Man Made Machine; Greeley Estates; The Cover Up
- Members: Joe Cotela; Matt Reinhard; Kyle Koelsch; Alex Adamcik
- Past members: David Ludlow

Ded (stylized as DED) is an American nu metal band from Tempe, Arizona made up of members from Greeley Estates and Man Made Machine. The band released its debut track "FMFY" in December 2016 with production by John Feldmann. Ded followed up with its first radio single "Anti-Everything" on February 3, 2017 with an exclusive premiere on Sirius XM Octane.

== History ==
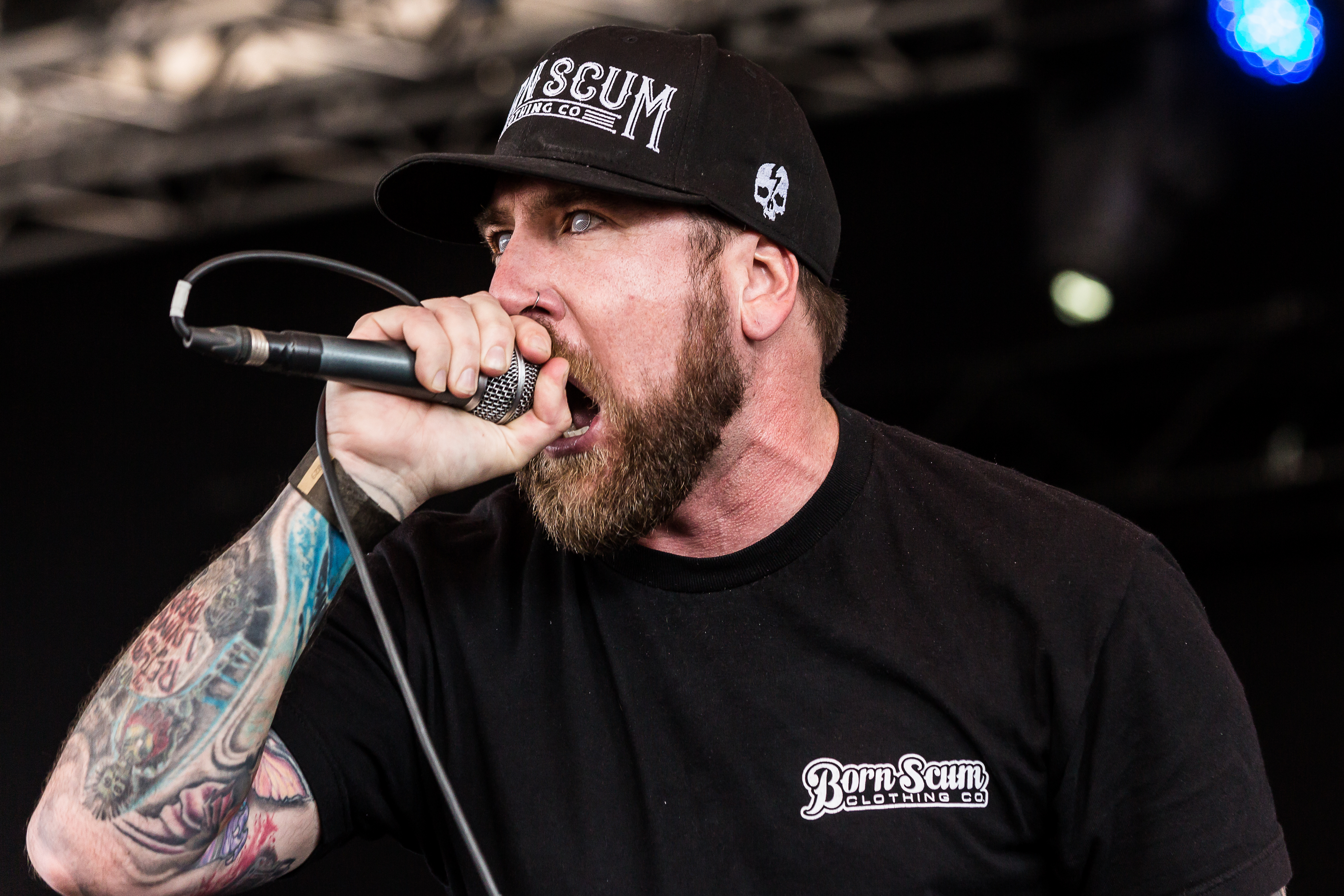
Singer Joe Cotela, With Full Force 2018

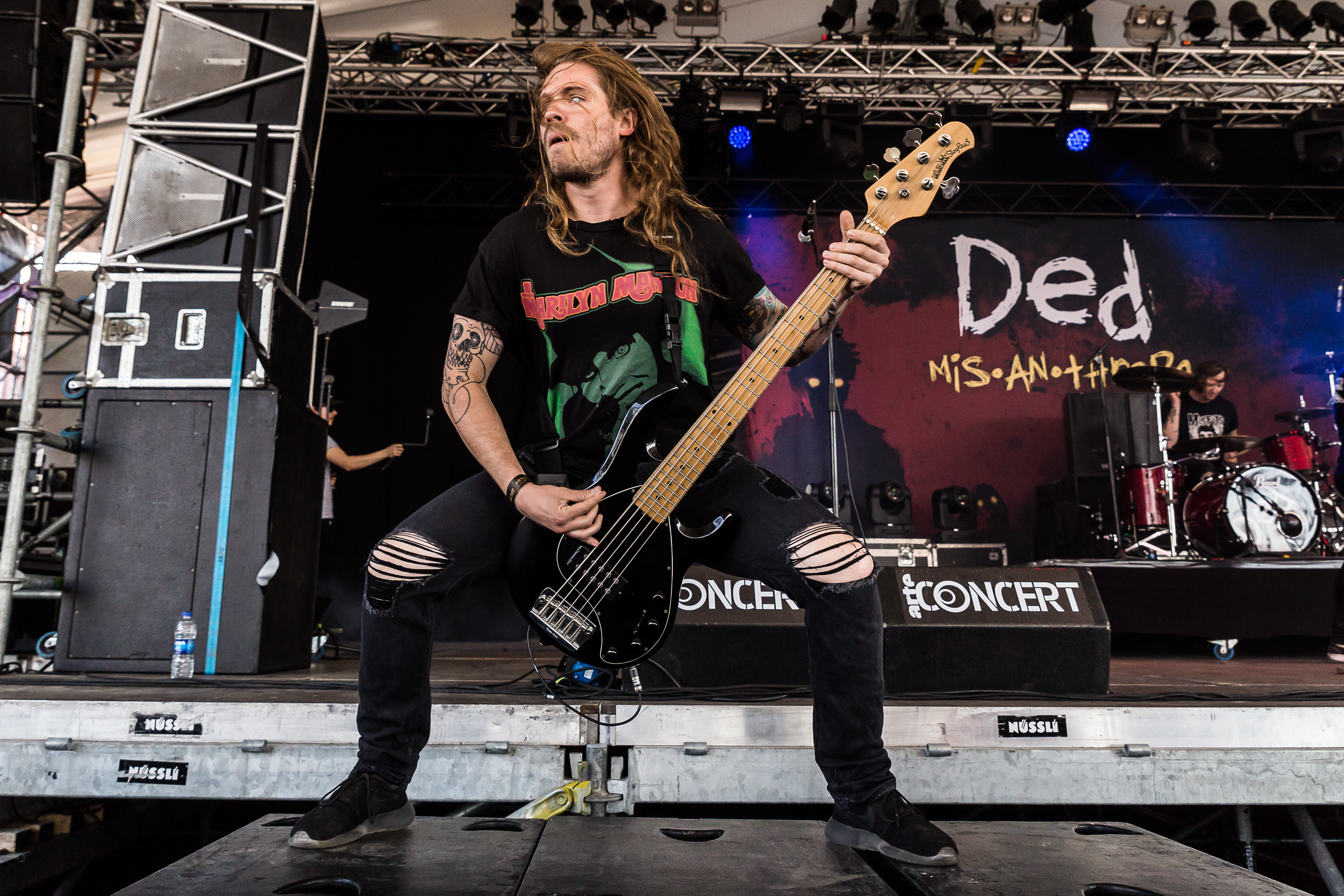
Bassist Kyle Koelsch, With Full Force 2018

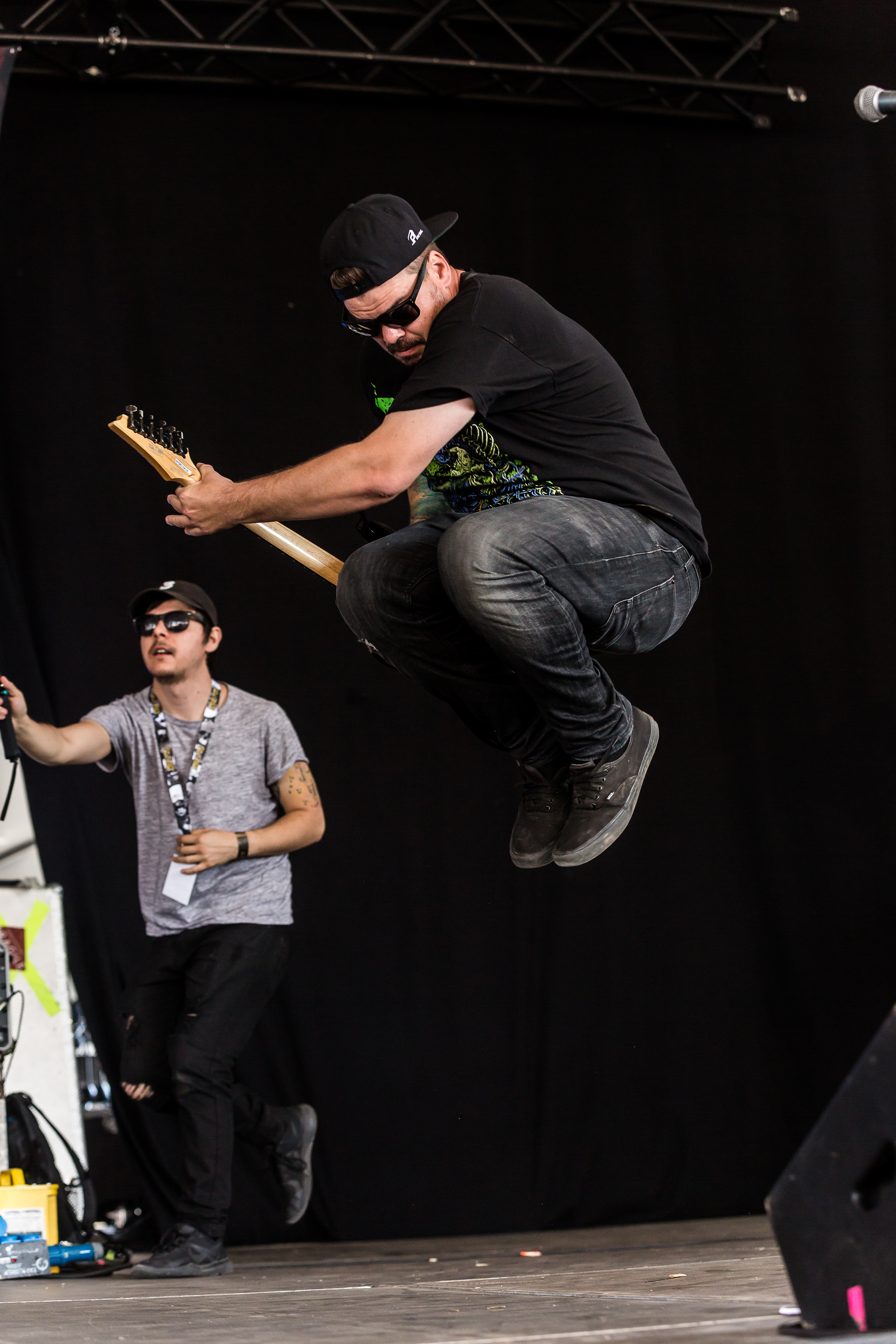
Former guitarist David Ludlow

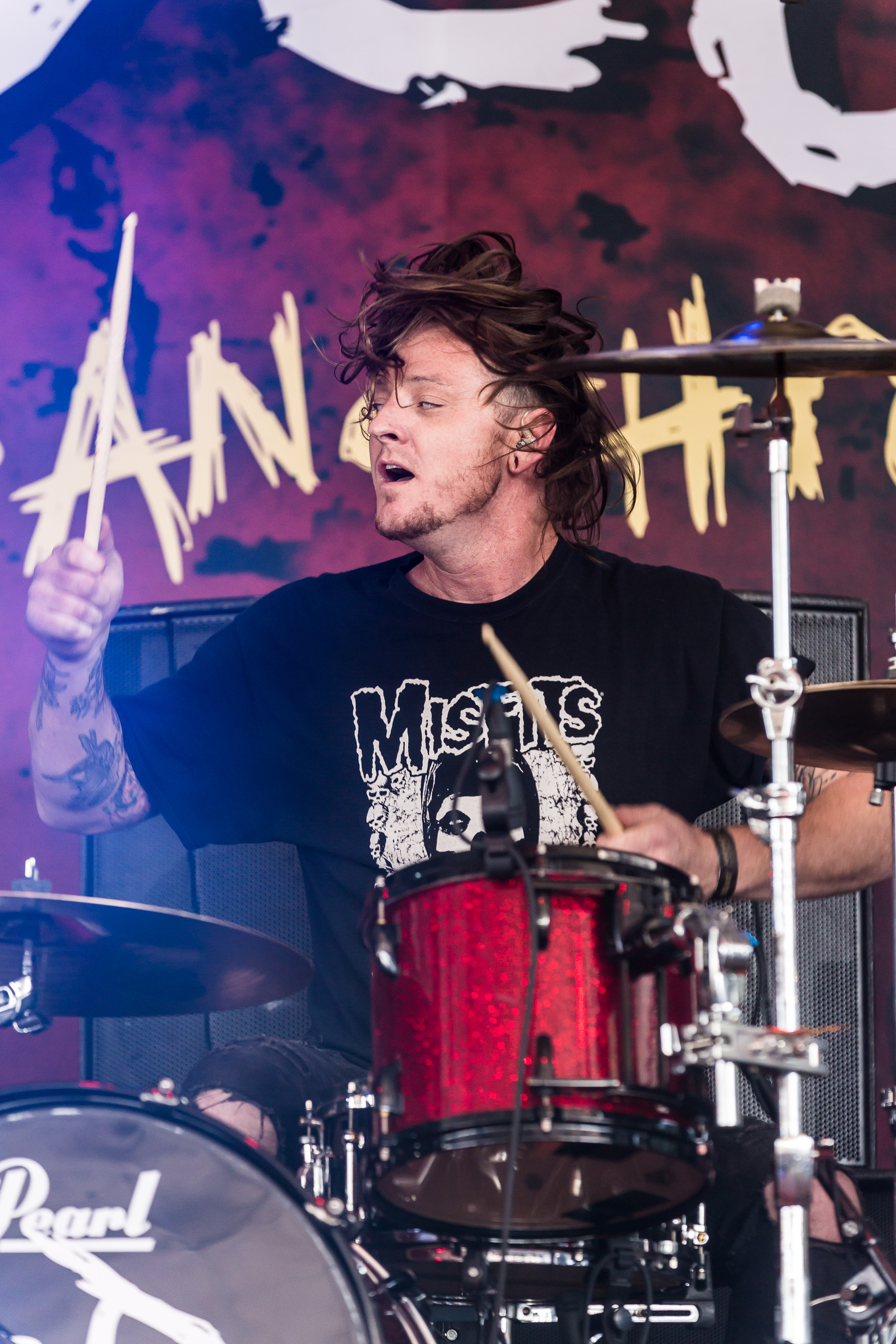
Drummer Matt Reinhard

The origins of the ensemble can be traced to Arizona band The Cover Up. Lead vocalist Joe Cotela stated that things with The Cover Up were approaching a standstill, and that they were performing music influenced by Every Time I Die. Because the band was dissatisfied with Epic Records not properly promoting the album, the band decided to move on.

This dissolution eventually formed Man Made Machine.

=== Formation and Mis-An-Thrope (2015–2017) ===
Shortly after Man Made Machine performed their final show, Cotela and percussionist Matthew Reinhard formed Ded along with guitarist David Ludlow and bassist Kyle Koelsch, both members of Greeley Estates. In December 2016, the band released its debut track "FMFY" on all digital platforms along with a music video. The following February, the band released its second single, "Anti-Everything." In May 2017, the latter composition ranked No. 18 on Mainstream Rock songs. Ded released their debut studio album, Mis-An-Thrope, on July 21, 2017.

=== Mannequin Eyes EP and School of Thought (2018–present) ===
In July 2018, the ensemble announced that they had begun working on their second studio album.

In April 2020, Suretone Records renewed its multiple-year deal with ADA Worldwide for exclusive distribution. Shortly thereafter, the band released a two-track EP entitled "Mannequin Eyes" which features the songs "A Mannequin Idol (Lullaby)" and "Eyes Sewn Shut".

Sometime in 2021, guitarist David Ludlow departed the group, and was replaced by Alex Adamcik.

At the time of the EP's arrival on streaming platforms, it was announced the band's second studio album will be arriving sometime after 2020 and will be the first studio release under the new deal. The album, School of Thought, was released on October 15, 2021.

== Touring ==
The band first toured with Korn and Animals As Leaders in May 2017 and Korn again in July and August on the Serenity of Summer Tour with Stone Sour, Yelawolf, and others. Ded also played at various rock festivals including Carolina Rebellion, Rock on the Range, Rocklahoma, Chicago Open Air, Louder than Life, and Aftershock Festival. In October 2017, Ded performed at the Loudwire Awards Kickoff Party in Los Angeles, California. They were also nominated for Best Name Artist at the award show. In October, the band announced a tour with Pop Evil that would run November to December.

Ded is set to open their 2018 touring season on In This Moment's The Witching Hour Tour with New Years Day and P.O.D. The tour will run January 16, 2018 through February 18. Ded also performed at Shiprocked on January 21–25.

In September–October 2018, the ensemble performed throughout North America with Blessthefall, The Word Alive, Thousand Below, and A War Within.

== Members ==
Current members

- Joe Cotela – lead vocals (2016–present)
- Matt Reinhard – drums (2016–present)
- Kyle Koelsch – bass, backing vocals (2016–present)
- Alex Adamcik – guitars, backing vocals (2021–present)

Former members

- David Ludlow – guitars, backing vocals (2016–2021)

Timeline

== Discography ==
=== Studio albums ===
Year	Album details	Peak chart positions		
Year	Album details	US Heat.	US Ind.	US Sales
2017	Mis-An-Thrope: Released: July 21, 2017; Label: Suretone; Formats: CD, DI	3	16	80
2021	School of Thought: Released: October 15, 2021; Label: Suretone; Formats: CD, DI	—	—	—
2025	Resent: Released: September 19, 2025; Label: UNFD; Formats: CD, DI	—	—	—

=== EPs ===
- Mannequin Eyes (2020)

=== Singles ===
Title	Year	Peak chart positions	Album
Title	Year	US Main.	Album
"FMFY"	2016	—	Mis.an.thrope
"Anti-Everything"	2017	18	Mis.an.thrope
"Dead to Me"	2017	—	Mis.an.thrope
"Remember the Enemy"	2017	21	Mis.an.thrope
"Hate Me"	2018	32	Mis.an.thrope
"A Mannequin Idol (Lullaby)"	2020	25	School of Thought
"Eyes Sewn Shut"	2020	—	School of Thought
"Parasite"	2020	—	School of Thought
"Kill Beautiful Things"	2021	13	School of Thought
"Ghost"	2022	—	
"Rockstar"	2024	—	Resent
"Until I Die" (featuring Chris Motionless)	2025	—	Resent
"Eraser"	2025	—	Resent
"Purpose: Be Myself"	2025	—	Resent

=== Music videos ===
Title	Year	Director(s)
"FMFY"	2017	Unknown
"Anti-Everything"	2017	Fred Durst
"Remember the Enemy"	2017	Fred Durst
"Hate Me"	2018	Shan Dan Horan
"A Mannequin Idol (Lullaby)"	2020	Marc Klasfeld
"Kill Beautiful Things"	2021	Marc Klasfeld
"Ghost"	2022	Shan Dan Horan
"Rockstar"	2024	Jacob Reynolds
"Until I Die"	2025	Justin Hudson
"Purpose: Be Myself"	2025	Tony Aguilera
