= Godmode =

Studio album by In This Moment
- Released: October 27, 2023
- Recorded: 2022
- Studios: Hideout Recording Studio in Las Vegas, Nevada
- Genres: Industrial; industrial metal; alternative metal
- Length: 39:01
- Label: BMG
- Producers: Kane Churko; Tyler Bates

In This Moment chronology
Mother (2020)	Godmode (2023)	Witch (2026)

Singles from Godmode
- 1. "I Would Die for You" Released: March 23, 2023; 2. "The Purge" Released: July 18, 2023; 3. "Godmode" Released: August 22, 2023; 4. "Army of Me" Released: September 20, 2023

Godmode is the eighth studio album by American rock band In This Moment. The album was released on October 27, 2023, through BMG Rights Management. It is the band's first album to not be produced by Kevin Churko since Beautiful Tragedy (2007). Instead, the album was produced by Kevin's son, Kane Churko, along with Tyler Bates. The album was preceded by four singles: "I Would Die for You", "The Purge", "Godmode", and "Army of Me" (Björk cover).

== Background and promotion ==
On January 28, 2023, it was announced that the band was entering the studio to begin recording for their upcoming eighth studio album. Maria Brink stated on Instagram, "The recording of the new ITM album is about to begin...we cannot wait for you all to hear what we are conjuring up". On March 23, the band released the song, "I Would Die for You". The song is featured on the John Wick: Chapter 4 soundtrack, for the John Wick: Chapter 4 film.

On April 11, In This Moment announced "The Dark Horizons Tour" with Motionless in White. The tour starts on July 8 and will feature Fit for a King and From Ashes to New as special guests. On July 8, while on "The Dark Horizons Tour" with Motionless in White, the band performed two songs, "The Purge" and "Sacrifice". The band also announced that the studio version of "The Purge" would be released on July 18. Along with the song's release, the band announced the album itself and release date, whilst also revealing the album cover and the track list. They also announced a co-headliner tour with Ice Nine Kills, with support from Avatar and New Years Day. On August 22, 2023, the band released album's title track as the second single. On September 20, the band released their cover of Björk's "Army of Me" on streaming music services as their third single. The album was recorded at Hideout Recording Studio in Las Vegas, Nevada, produced by Kane Churko (Ozzy Osbourne, Papa Roach, Five Finger Death Punch) and Tyler Bates (Jerry Cantrell and Bush).

== Composition ==
Godmode has been described as industrial, industrial metal, and alternative metal, with elements of metalcore. "The Purge" and "Godmode" "mix throbbing beats, keyboards and djent-style guitar riffs." According to Dom Lawson of Blabbermouth.net, [the album] expands upon the gothic and industrial influences that dominated 2020's Mother." and "[is] heavy on post-NIN industrial throb 'n' squelch, the likes of the wild and aggressive title track, "Sanctify Me" and a crushing cover of Björk's "Army of Me" are classic, hard-edged In This Moment." "Sacrifice" has "Nine Inch Nails-inspired electronics". "Skyburner" has been described as a "prog metal/dream-pop hybrid". "Everything Starts and Ends with You" is...built upon an alien electro pulse, but with a razor-sharp pop-metal chorus". "Damaged" features Spencer Charnas of Ice Nine Kills and has been described as "cross-pollinated alt-metal". "Fate Bringer" contains an "unsettling dance rhythm". The closing track, "I Would Die for You", has been described as an "epic rock ballad". Instead of working with their long time producer, Kevin Churko, the band worked with his son, Kane Churko. According to Punktastic, "it's reasonable to assume [Kane's] youth is driving the album's relative freshness, leading to a really great piece of production. Notably the guitar tones change between soft or djenty depending on the context and feel remarkably heavy even when they're understated."

== Critical reception ==
Professional ratings
Review scores
Source	Rating
Blabbermouth.net	7/10
Kerrang!	4/5 stars
Metal Hammer	4/5 stars
Riff	7/10
Rock 'N' Load	9/10
Soundmagnet	8/10
Sputnikmusic	3.3/5
Wall of Sound	8/10

Godmode received generally positive reviews from critics. Dom Lawson of Blabbermouth.net wrote, "In every other respect, this is a strong and gently subversive piece of work. As ever, In This Moment have vast commercial potential, but there is plenty of evidence that they remain slightly too weird and unpredictable for that potential to be fully realized. For that alone, they should be loudly applauded." Kerrang! was positive about the album's sound, Steve Beebee stating, "From electronic throb and dark pop menace, Godmode persistently creates new textures that nevertheless resolve in ways that will get heads nodding and hands raised at the band's uniquely theatrical live shows." Metal Hammer gave the album a positive review and stated that "Anyone who's been paying attention knows that, for some time, In This Moment have had the live show and back catalogue to grant them access to metal's top tier. If there's any justice in the world, Godmode will be the album that finally sees them break down the door."

Mike DeWald of Riff wrote, "At its core, the eighth album from SoCal rockers In This Moment is the natural extension of a sound the band has been cultivating for years." Rock 'N' Load praised the album saying, "All in all, Godmode is a frantically beautiful collection of songs, a perfect change of pace and direction if you need a pallet cleanser. If you haven't delved into the world of In This Moment, this could just be the perfect time to get your hands dirty." Simon K. of Sputnikmusic wrote that they were surprised by Godmode:"[it's] their best album since Blood...The band's experimentation with atmosphere comes into fruition on Godmode, and uses their old, heavier style in the process...it's certainly a step in the right direction...If you're a fan of the band's older sound but didn't gel with what they've been doing since 2014, give this a go." Wall of Sound wrote, "This album is excellent, especially if you want something different in the heavy music world."

== Track listing ==
Godmode track listing
No.	Title	Writer(s)	Length
1.	"Godmode"	Maria Brink; Chris Howorth; Kane Churko	4:00
2.	"The Purge"	Brink; Howorth; Churko; Randy Weitzel	3:59
3.	"Army of Me" (Björk cover)	Björk Guðmundsdóttir; Graham Massey	3:10
4.	"Sacrifice"	Brink; Howorth; Churko	4:22
5.	"Skyburner"	Brink; Howorth; Churko	3:53
6.	"Sanctify Me"	Brink; Howorth; Churko; Weitzel; Travis Johnson	4:11
7.	"Everything Starts and Ends with You"	Brink; Howorth; Churko; Tyler Bates	3:33
8.	"Damaged" (featuring Spencer Charnas)	Brink; Howorth; Churko	3:24
9.	"Fate Bringer"	Brink; Howorth; Churko; Bates	3:53
10.	"I Would Die for You"	Brink; Howorth; Bates	4:36
Total length:			39:01

== Personnel ==
In This Moment

- Maria Brink – lead vocals, piano
- Chris Howorth – lead guitar, backing vocals, programming
- Randy Weitzel – rhythm guitar, backing vocals
- Travis Johnson – bass, backing vocals
- Kent Diimmel – drums

Additional musicians

- Spencer Charnas – guest vocals on track 8

Additional personnel

- Kane Churko – production, engineering, mixing
- Tyler Bates – production

== Charts ==
Chart performance for Godmode
Chart (2023)	Peak position
Scottish Albums (Official Charts)	66
Swiss Albums (Schweizer Hitparade)	78
UK Album Downloads (Official Charts)	14
UK Independent Albums (Official Charts)	21
UK Rock & Metal Albums (Official Charts)	8
