= First World Problems (album) =

Studio album by Failure Anthem
- Released: January 22, 2016
- Recorded: 2013–2015
- Genre: Hard rock
- Length: 42:18
- Labels: Razor & Tie, Sony Music Entertainment
- Producers: Failure Anthem, Drew Fulk

Singles from First World Problems
- 1. "Paralyzed" Released: May 19, 2015; 2. "First World Problems" Released: June 22, 2016

First World Problems is the debut studio album for hard rock band Failure Anthem. After two years of writing and recording, the album was released on January 22, 2016, by Razor & Tie Records, a subsidiary of Sony Music Entertainment. The album debuted at number 12 on the Billboard Top Heatseekers chart, and its first single, "Paralyzed", peaked at number 23 on the Mainstream Rock chart.

== Background and recording ==
The band first began on work for the album after their formation in 2013. The project started as a collaboration between friends, lead vocalist JD Eubanks and guitarist Kile Odell. Odell, who, after working as a music studio worker for years, assisting various bands such as Motionless in White, had desired to start his own project. Eubanks, who had prior moved to Los Angeles to work as a chef under Wolfgang Puck, had not found success in the endeavor, eventually finding himself homeless. Upon moving back to Greensboro, Odell convinced him to start working on music together. Impressed with the initial results, they recruited the rest of the band – Wil Andrews as a second guitarist, Ryan Nimmo as a bassist, and Zane Frye on drums – and began working on recording an album.

The band worked with Drew Fulk, who had previously worked frequently with Odell during his stint as a studio worker. The song creation process would start with Odell creating a basic melody, chord progression, or "Nine Inch Nails-esque" beat or electronic loop to create a chorus. From there, he would work with the rest of the band to write lyrical themes and create the rest of the song, and work with Banks on the vocals. Fulk shared duties with Odell in regards to producing the album, with Odell often bouncing ideas off of Fulk prior to mixing the final takes himself. The group wrote and recorded demos for over 35 songs over the course of two years, eventually settling on 11 tracks and finalizing the album around October 2015.

== Themes and composition ==
Odell stated that the album's theme was based around the concept of a first world problem, criticizing society's tendency to focus on and complain about ultimately insignificant problems. The lyrics were meant to give the listener a sense of hope after hearing about the trials that band members had personally overcome, making them feel like they too could overcome their problems. The opening track "First World Problems" alludes to the time that Eubanks was homeless. The closing track "I Won't Say Goodbye" was written around Odell's experience as a teenager regarding the denial he felt during the sickness, and eventual death, of his mother. While primarily in regards to Odell, the lyrics also touched on sentiments regarding lost loved ones of Eubanks and producer Drew Fulk as well.

The band's music has primarily been described as hard rock. Odell felt that some of the tracks, such as "The Ghost Inside" even had a bit of an "industrial" feel to them.

== Release and promotion ==
Shortly after the completion of the album, their management secured them a record label contract with Razor & Tie, a subsidiary of Sony Music Entertainment, to release the album. The album had initially scheduled to be released in the second half of 2015, but was eventually delayed to January 22, 2016. As such, the band released the song's first single, "Paralyzed", well before the album's release, in May 2015. An accompanying music video, produced by Aaron Marsh, was released at the same time. Upon the album's eventual release, the album charted on several of the Billboard charts, including number 12 on the Top Heatseekers chart, number 12 on the Top Hard Rock charts, and number 39 on the Top Rock Albums chart. "Paralyzed" peaked at number 24 on the Billboard Mainstream Rock chart in 2016 as well.

Prior to the album's release, the band promoted its upcoming release with a tour with the band Like a Storm. After a short break to release the album, the band resumed touring again for further promotion, most notably securing a spot Carolina Rebellion shows in May 2016 alongside Shinedown and Megadeth.

== Reception ==
The album was generally well received by critics. The staff reviewer of Sputnik Music favorably compared it to the type of hard rock that was popular in the early 2000s, such as Alterbridge, Seether, and Breaking Benjamin, stating that the album was "catchy, upbeat rock music executed by a group of musicians with a little bit of talent and vision. They have plenty of flaws, and they aren’t the next coming of the Foo Fighters, but they are definitely creating new waves of energy in a genre pool that has been stagnant for years – a feat worth lauding in itself. If you don’t mind the intrinsic faults of popular rock music, then First World Problems is likely a debut that will capture your interest from start to finish."

== Track listing ==
All tracks are written by Failure Anthem

No.	Title	Length
1.	"First World Problems"	2:59
2.	"The Ghost Inside"	3:57
3.	"Paralyzed"	3:41
4.	"Here for Good"	4:18
5.	"Just a Wasteland"	3:26
6.	"Leap of Faith"	3:35
7.	"3 AM"	4:22
8.	"Carousel (ft. Kelly Silver)"	4:06
9.	"Savannah"	4:09
10.	"One Step at a Time"	4:08
11.	"I Won't Say Goodbye"	3:37
Total length:		42:18

== Personnel ==
Credits per AllMusic.

Band

- JD Eubanks – lead vocals
- Kile Odell – lead guitar
- Wil Andrews – rhythm guitar
- Ryan Nimmo – bass, backing vocals
- Zane Frye – drums

Additional musicians

- Kelly Silver – duet vocals on "Carousel"
- Drew Fulk – background vocals
- Lucas Fowler – background vocals
- Wes Lauterbach – background vocals

Production

- Kile Odell – production, mixing, mastering
- Drew Fulk – production, mixing, mastering
- Wes Lauterbach – assistant sound engineer
- Michael Brantley – assistant sound engineer

== Chart performance ==
Album

Chart (2016)	Peak position
US Billboard Top Heatseekers	12

Singles

Year	Title	Peak position
Year	Title	Billboard Mainstream Rock
2016	"Paralyzed"	23
2016	"First World Problems"	34
