= Man Made Machine =

Former hard rock band from Phoenix, Arizona

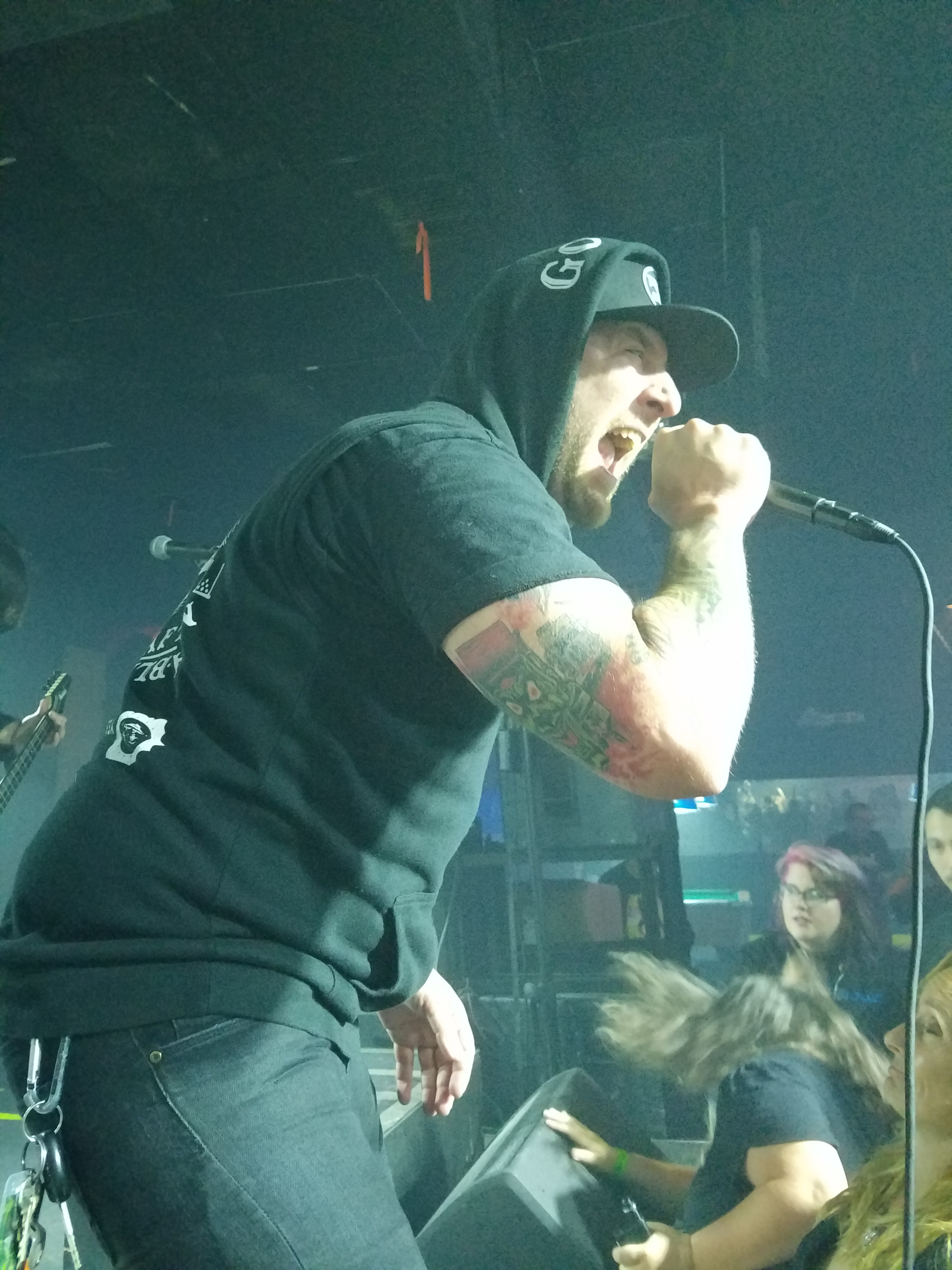

Background information
- Origin: Phoenix, Arizona, U.S.
- Genres: Alternative metal, post-grunge, hard rock, nu metal
- Years active: 2011–2015
- Label: Razor and Tie
- Past members: Joe Cotela; Marc Hernandez; Matt Reinhard; Justyn Sena; Steve Siminski

Man Made Machine was an American hard rock band from Phoenix, Arizona. The band released its debut album Become in 2011 with production by Chad Gray and Greg Tribbett in addition to mixing by Kishan Pandey.

== History ==
The origins of the ensemble can be traced back to Arizona band The Cover Up. Lead vocalist Joe Cotela stated that things with The Cover Up were approaching a standstill, and that they were performing music swayed by Every Time I Die. Because the band was dissatisfied with Epic Records not properly promoting the album, the band decided to move on.

On October 2, 2015, Man Made Machine performed their final concert, and released B-Sides and Rarities, a compilation album of 34 songs.

Shortly after performing their final show, lead vocalist Joe Cotela and percussionist Matthew Reinhard formed a new ensemble named DED along with guitarist David Ludlow and bassist Kyle Koelsch. In December 2016, the band published a music video for "FMFY", the first song portrayed by the band. In February of the following year, a similar release was made for "Anti-Everything", the second single from the band. At the end of that month, the ensemble announced that Mis.an.thrope, their debut studio album, is scheduled for release on July 14, 2017. However, the release date was changed to July 21, 2017.

== Touring ==
The band has toured with Escape The Fate, Dr. Acula, Aranda and Shaman's Harvest.

== Critical reception ==
Jennifer Beaudoin of WQBK-FM stated that "The band fits in very well with today’s popular rock bands, as they have similar sound and style, while showing the world what they have “become” since luckily being signed, recorded, released and on tour". Mark S. Tucker of The Buzz About described Become as "one long contrast between reckless defiant balls-out bluster and gob-spittle against some interestingly introspective explorations of what lies beneath such rampant rage and desperation". The video for "Victim", the first single from the debut album was No. 2 most added during its first week at Active Rock radio.

== Personnel ==
- Joe Cotela – vocals
- Justyn Sena – bass
- Matt Reinhard – drums
- Marc Hernandez – guitar
- Steve Siminski – guitar

== Discography ==
=== Studio albums ===
- Become (2011)

=== EPs ===
- Undeniable (2014)

=== Compilation albums ===
- B-Sides and Rarities (2015)

=== Singles ===
- "Victim" (2011) #34 Mainstream rock
- "X-Rated" (2014)
