= School of Thought (album) =

Studio album by Ded
- Released: October 15, 2021
- Genre: Nu metal, alternative metal
- Length: 35:40
- Label: Suretone
- Producer: Kevin Churko

Ded chronology
Mis•an•thrope (2017)	School of Thought (2021)	Resent (2025)

School of Thought is the second studio album by American nu metal band Ded. Released on 15 October 2021, the work was produced by Kevin Churko and published via Suretone Records.

== Background ==
In March 2020, the quartet released tracks for "A Mannequin Idol (Lullaby)" and "Eyes Sewn Shut", both a part of their Mannequin Eyes EP.

During May 2020, the ensemble released a music video for "A Mannequin Idol (Lullaby)", which was directed by Marc Klasfeld. The song title is a play on words for "American Idol".

Then, in August 2021, the group released "Kill Beautiful Things", the first song involving new guitarist Alex Adamcik. The tune began with a demo transmitted by Adamcik and bass player Kyle Koelsch, with singer Joe Cotela playing the work in his vehicle and writing the lyrics while sitting in the driver seat.

== Critical reception ==
Augusta Battoclette of Alternative Press stated "From the evocative vocals on “Kill Beautiful Things” to the anthemic “Half Alive,” it’s clear that DED are embracing their sonic growth and maturity as a rock outfit".

Jeannie Blue of Cryptic Rock indicated that "With the passing of four years, the quartet—Vocalist Joe Cotela, Guitarist Alex Adamcik, Bassist Kyle Koelsch, and Drummer Matt Reinhard—has evolved from thick Nu Metal influences that proudly waved a sonic “FMFY” middle finger toward a more refined cynicism", going on to say that "Much as 2017’s Mis•an•thrope sought to provoke, School of Thought inspires discussion of false idols, willful ignorance, mental health, and begs listeners to “stop making stupid people famous”".

Regarding "A Mannequin Idol (Lullaby)" and "Eyes Sewn Shut", Kevin Rutherford of Billboard professed that they "largely follow that same formula, albeit with less of a rap rock edge that occasionally permeated Mis-an-thrope and a radio-ready nu-metal sound courtesy of Kevin Churko, one of the genre's more in-demand producers (Five Finger Death Punch, Disturbed)".

That Music Magazine said that "The new track “A Mannequin Idol (Lullaby)” takes on the conveyor-belt music machine and the fake, surface-level aspects of our society that have somehow entered our society influencing what’s real in life" going on to describe “Eyes Sewn Shut” as having "explosive guitars and a message that challenges that things we accept so readily to be true".

Blabbermouth.net stated that "The Phoenix-based band's new music takes on the fury of its debut and deepens the emotions with a compassion for humanity and a thought-provoking consciousness that we can all be and do better, not only for ourselves but each other".

== Touring ==
In 2021, the four piece toured the United States with American rock bands Black Veil Brides and In This Moment.

== Track listing ==
No.	Title	Length
1.	"Ghost"	3:28
2.	"Kill Beautiful Things"	4:11
3.	"Love Song" (feat. Maria Brink)	3:36
4.	"Eyes Sewn Shut"	2:59
5.	"A Mannequin Idol (Lullaby)"	3:26
6.	"Parasite"	2:51
7.	"Persona"	3:04
8.	"My Blood (My Family)"	3:37
9.	"10 Minutes Underwater"	3:32
10.	"Half Alive"	3:45
11.	"Lost"	3:11
Total length:		35:40
