= Failure Anthem =

American hard rock band

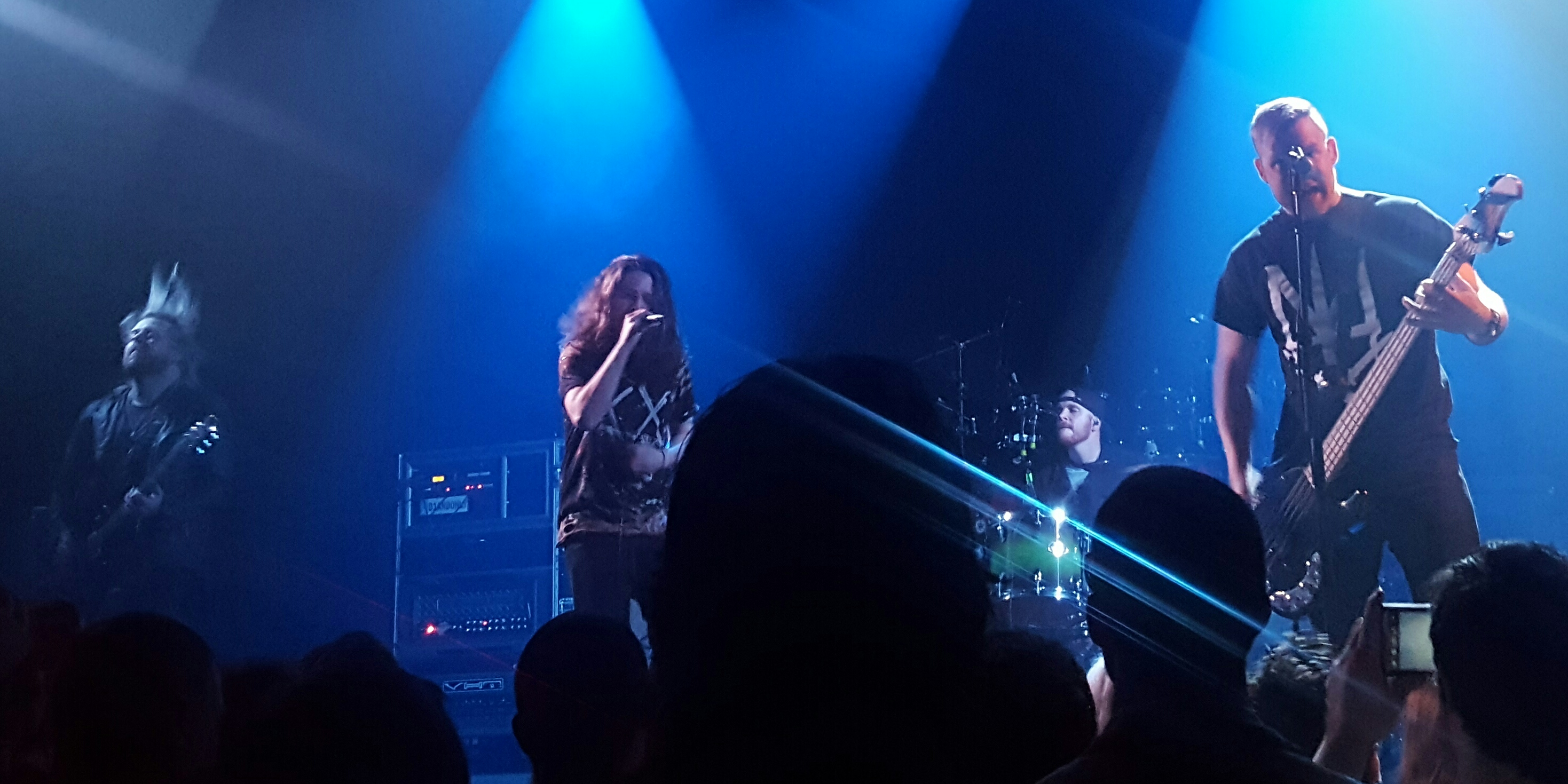
- Failure Anthem photographed in Montreal, Quebec, Canada at the Corona Theatre.

Background information
- Origin: Greensboro, North Carolina
- Genre: Hard rock
- Years active: 2013–2017 (hiatus)
- Labels: Razor & Tie; Sony Music Entertainment
- Members: Kile Odell; Ryan Nimmo; Troy Surratt
- Past members: JD Eubanks; Wil Andrews; Zane Frye; Chris Pierson

Failure Anthem is an American hard rock band from Greensboro, North Carolina. Forming in 2013, they worked on recording a debut album for two years before signing to Razor & Tie, a subsidiary of Sony Music Entertainment, in late 2015. Their debut album, First World Problems, was released on January 22, 2016.

== History ==
=== Formation and early years (2013–2014) ===
The band first formed in 2013 in Greensboro, North Carolina. The project started as a collaboration between friends, lead vocalist JD Eubanks and guitarist Kile Odell. Odell, who, after working on assisting various bands such as Motionless in White, had desired to start his own project. Eubanks, who had prior moved to Los Angeles to work as a chef under Wolfgang Puck, had not found success in the endeavor, eventually finding himself homeless. Upon moving back to Greensboro, Odell convinced him to start working on music together. Impressed with the initial results, they recruited the rest of the band – Wil Andrews as a second guitarist, Ryan Nimmo as a bassist, and Zane Frye on drums – and began working on recording an album. The group wrote and recorded demos for over 35 songs over the course of two years, eventually settling on 11 tracks and finalizing the album around October 2015.

=== First World Problems (2015–present) ===
Just after completing the recording of the album, their management secured them a record label contract with Razor & Tie, a subsidiary of Sony Music Entertainment. The album, titled First World Problems, was initially scheduled to be released in the second half of 2015, but was eventually delayed to, and release on, January 22, 2016. The album charted on several of the Billboard charts, including number 12 on the Top Heatseekers chart, number 12 on the Top Hard Rock charts, and number 39 on the Top Rock Albums chart. The band released their first single from the album, "Paralyzed", well in advance of the album's release, in May 2015. An accompanying music video, produced by Aaron Marsh, was released at the same time. The single peaked at number 24 on the Billboard Mainstream Rock chart in 2016. The band toured with Like a Storm prior to the album's release as well.

Shortly after the release of the album, the band resumed touring. Notably, the band played at Carolina Rebellion shows in May 2016, alongside Shinedown and Megadeth. Shortly after the shows, the band would go through multiple lineup changes. In June 2016, Eubanks left the band, citing personal and financial reasons, and was replaced by new singer Chris Pierson. Frye also left the band for personal reasons and was replaced by Troy Surratt, and Andrews left a short time later, and was not replaced, making the band into a quartet. In February 2017, Pierson departed from the band for personal reasons.

== Musical style, influences, and themes ==
The band's music has primarily been described as hard rock. Each member's previous smaller local bands they had played in had influenced their approach to making music as well – Eubanks and Odell coming from a heavy metal background, Nimmo coming from a rock and country music background, and Andrews and Frye coming from pop punk background. Odell in particular has mentioned James Hetfield of Metallica as his biggest influence in his guitar-work, mostly notably the track "Sad but True". Odell explained the meaning behind the band's name, and how it ultimately reflected the positive aspect of their music, stating:

It has this underdog theme to it, which is like an anthem to people who don’t feel like they can beat the odds but they can, you know? It’s like, you have those people in life that no one thinks that they’re capable of doing things, and then — you know, we want to be the people who say, “Yeah, you can do it. You’re not stuck. You can do whatever you want to do.”

Similarly, he stated that the band's album First World Problems was indeed related to the concept of a first world problem, criticizing society's tendency to focus on and complain about ultimately insignificant problems.

== Band members ==
Current

- Kile Odell – lead guitar (2013–present)
- Ryan Nimmo – bass, backing vocals (2013–present)
- Troy Surratt – drums (2016–present)

Former

- JD Eubanks – lead vocals (2013–2016)
- Zane Frye – drums (2013–2016)
- Wil Andrews – rhythm guitar (2013–2016)
- Chris Pierson – lead vocals (2016–2017)

== Discography ==
Studio albums

- First World Problems (2016)

=== Singles ===
Title	Year	US Main.	Album
"Paralyzed"	2015	23	First World Problems
"First World Problems"	2016	34	First World Problems

=== Promotional Singles ===
Title	Year	Album
"Here for Good"	2016	First World Problems
"Just a Wasteland"	2016	First World Problems
"Leap of Faith"	2016	First World Problems

=== Music Videos ===
Title	Year	Album
"Paralyzed"	2015	First World Problems
"First World Problems"	2016	First World Problems
"Here For Good"	2016	First World Problems
