= First World problem =

Term for issues in the First World

First World problem is an informal term for the issues in First World nations that are complained about in response to the perceived absence of more pressing concerns. It has been called a subset of the fallacy of relative privation and is also used to acknowledge gratefulness for not having worse problems, such as those in the Second or Third Worlds. It has been used to minimize complaints about trivial issues and shame the complainer, to generate humour at the expense of First World culture, and as good-humored self-deprecation.

== History ==
The term First World problem first appeared in 1979 in G. K. Payne's work Built Environment, but gained recognition as an Internet meme beginning in 2005, particularly on social networking sites like Twitter (where it became a popular hashtag). In 2012, UNICEF NZ conducted a survey of First World problems in New Zealand, finding "slow web access" to be the most common. The phrase was added to the Oxford Dictionary Online in November 2012, and to the online Macquarie Dictionary in December 2012.

== Examples ==
Things that have been cited as being First World problems include:

- Slow Internet access
- Poor mobile-phone coverage
- Phone battery dying (low battery anxiety)
- Television remote not working
- Misplacing AirPods (the most frequent complaint about AirPods). Apple Inc. attempted to alleviate this problem by introducing a "Find My AirPods" application in 2017.
- Not being able to find items in a shop
- Getting a bad haircut
- Bad-tasting fruit
- Self-checkout in stores
- Forgetting headphones
- Feeling that there is nothing to eat despite plenty of food being available

== See also ==
- Diseases of affluence
- First World privilege
- Maslow's hierarchy of needs
- Whataboutism
