= Shinedown discography =

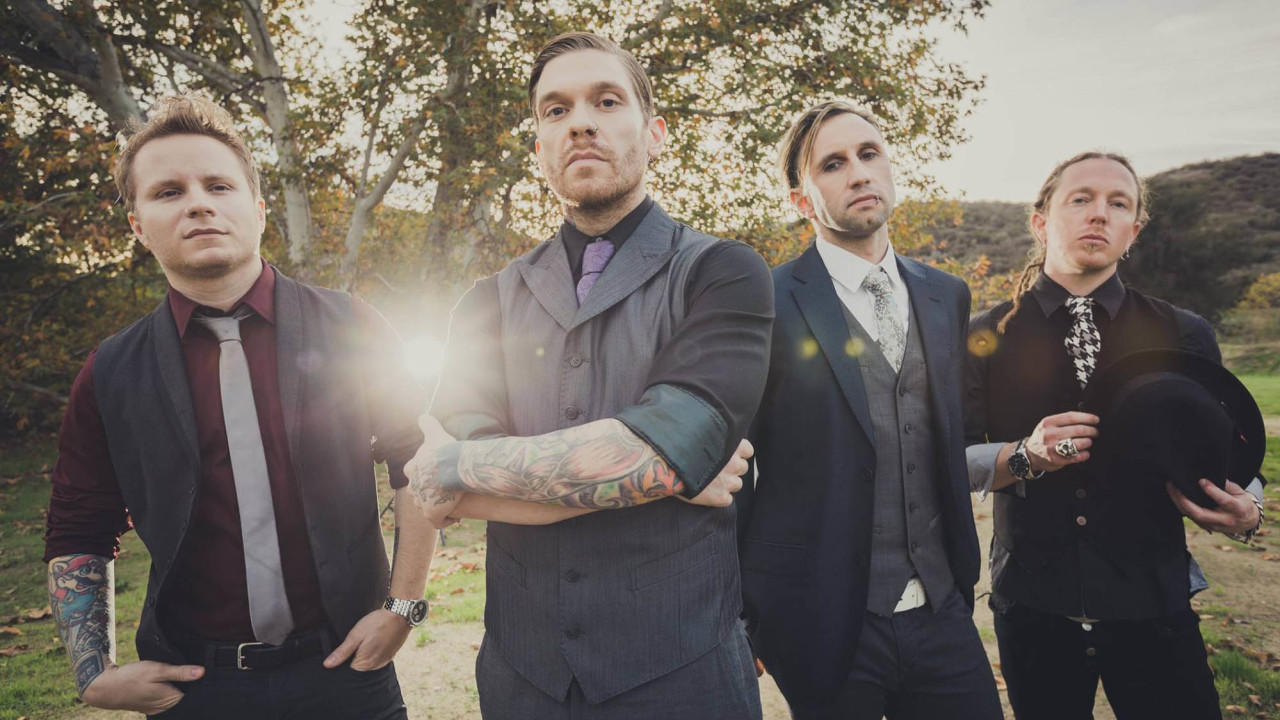
- Shinedown in 2012
- Studio albums: 8
- Extended plays: 4
- Live albums: 1
- Compilation albums: 1
- Singles: 37
- Video albums: 5
- Music videos: 47
- Promotional singles: 21

The American rock band Shinedown has released eight studio albums, one live album, one compilation album, five video albums, four extended plays, 37 singles, 47 music videos, and 21 promotional singles.

All of Shinedown's singles have charted on at least one Billboard tracking chart. Their biggest hit is "Second Chance", the second single from their album The Sound of Madness. The single reached number seven on the Hot 100, number three on the Mainstream Top 40, and number one on the Hot Mainstream Rock Tracks, Alternative Songs, and Adult Top 40 charts.

Shinedown has found much of its success on the Hot Mainstream Rock Tracks chart, as each of their 36 singles in the format has reached the top five, with "Young Again" becoming the most recent in August 2026. Of those 36 singles, twenty four of them have climbed to the number one spot, a chart record.

The band also has three singles that spent at least 10 weeks at number one. Their first single to do this was also their first ever chart topper, "Save Me", which came from the 2005 album Us and Them. "Second Chance" became the second during its massive run of success. The third and most recent was "Bully", which was released in 2012 off of the album Amaryllis.

== Albums ==
=== Studio albums ===
List of albums, with selected chart positions, sales figures and certifications
Title	Album details	Peak chart positions									Sales	Certifications
Title	Album details	US	AUS	AUT	CAN	GER	NLD	NZ	SWI	UK	Sales	Certifications
Leave a Whisper	Released: May 27, 2003; Label: Atlantic; Format: LP, CD, digital download	53	—	—	—	—	—	32	—	—		RIAA: Platinum; MC: Gold
Us and Them	Released: October 4, 2005; Label: Atlantic; Format: LP, CD, digital download	23	—	—	—	—	—	—	—	—		RIAA: Platinum
The Sound of Madness	Released: June 24, 2008; Label: Atlantic; Format: LP, CD, digital download	8	—	70	19	—	—	24	—	143	UK: 129,250	RIAA: 2× Platinum; BPI: Gold; MC: 2× Platinum
Amaryllis	Released: March 27, 2012; Label: Atlantic, Roadrunner; Format: LP, CD, digital download	4	78	43	7	36	85	26	28	18		RIAA: Gold; BPI: Silver; MC: Gold
Threat to Survival	Released: September 18, 2015; Label: Atlantic; Format: LP, CD, digital download	6	37	38	8	40	50	34	13	13		RIAA: Gold; BPI: Silver; MC: Gold
Attention Attention	Released: May 4, 2018; Label: Atlantic; Format: LP, CD, digital download	5	45	21	8	21	77	— (Note: Attention Attention did not enter the NZ Top 40 Albums Chart, but peaked at number 2 on the NZ Heatseeker Albums Chart.)	10	8		RIAA: Gold; MC: Gold
Planet Zero	Released: July 1, 2022; Label: Atlantic; Format: LP, CD, digital download	5	—	21	46	15	—	5	10	4	US: 452,000	
Eight	Released: May 29, 2026; Label: Atlantic; Format: LP, CD, digital download	12	7	17	49	23	—	21	14	8	UK: 8,529	
"—" denotes items which were not released in that country or failed to chart.

=== Live albums ===
Title	Album details	Peak chart positions		Certifications
Title	Album details	US	US Rock	Certifications
Somewhere in the Stratosphere	Released: May 3, 2011; Label: Atlantic; Format: 2CD + 2DVD	83	21	RIAA: Gold

=== Compilation albums ===
Title	Album details
The Studio Album Collection	Released: November 11, 2013; Label: Atlantic

== Extended plays ==
Title	EP details	Peak chart positions	
Title	EP details	US	US Rock
Shinedown	Released: June 20, 2006; Label: Atlantic	—	—
Rolling Stone Original	Released: June 27, 2006; Label: Atlantic	—	—
iTunes Session	Released: April 6, 2010; Label: Atlantic (US), WEA (international)	118	35
The Warner Sound Live Room EP	Released: May 28, 2013; Label: Atlantic	—	—
"—" denotes a release that did not chart.

== Singles ==
List of singles as lead artist, with selected chart positions and certifications, showing year released and album name
Title	Year	Peak chart positions										Certifications	Album
Title	Year	US	US Adult	US Alt.	US Main.	US Rock	AUS	AUT	CAN	NZ	UK	Certifications	Album
"Fly from the Inside"	2003	—	—	34	5	—	—	—	—	—	—		Leave a Whisper
"45"	2003	—	—	12	3	—	—	—	—	—	—	RIAA: Platinum	Leave a Whisper
"Simple Man"	2004	—	—	40	5	—	—	—	—	—	—	RIAA: Platinum; RMNZ: Gold	Leave a Whisper
"Burning Bright"	2004	— (Note: "Burning Bright" did not enter the Billboard Hot 100, but peaked at number 5 on the Bubbling Under Hot 100 Singles chart.)	—	22	2	—	—	—	—	—	—		Leave a Whisper
"Save Me"	2005	72	—	2	1	—	—	—	—	—	—	RIAA: Gold	Us and Them
"I Dare You"	2006	88	—	8	2	—	—	—	—	—	—		Us and Them
"Heroes"	2006	—	—	28	4	—	—	—	—	—	—		Us and Them
"Devour"	2008	— (Note: "Devour" did not enter the Billboard Hot 100, but peaked at number 14 on the Bubbling Under Hot 100 Singles chart.)	—	13	1	—	—	—	—	—	— (Note: "Devour" did not enter the UK Singles Chart, but peaked at number 11 on the UK Rock & Metal Singles Chart.)	RIAA: Gold	The Sound of Madness
"Second Chance"	2008	7	1	1	1	8	19	13	29	32	74	RIAA: 3× Platinum; ARIA: Gold; BPI: Silver; MC: 3× Platinum; RMNZ: Platinum	The Sound of Madness
"Sound of Madness"	2009	85	—	5	1	2	—	—	—	—	— (Note: "Sound of Madness" did not enter the UK Singles Chart, but peaked at number 77 on the UK Physical Singles Chart.)	RIAA: Platinum; BPI: Silver; MC: Platinum; RMNZ: Gold	The Sound of Madness
"If You Only Knew"	2009	42	11	7	2	4	—	—	64	—	—	RIAA: Platinum; MC: Gold	The Sound of Madness
"The Crow & the Butterfly"	2010	97	—	6	1	1	—	—	51	—	—	RIAA: Gold	The Sound of Madness
"Diamond Eyes (Boom-Lay Boom-Lay Boom)"	2010	— (Note: "Diamond Eyes" did not enter the Billboard Hot 100, but peaked at number 11 on the Bubbling Under Hot 100 Singles chart.)	—	17	1	7	—	—	—	—	— (Note: "Diamond Eyes" did not enter the UK Singles Chart, but peaked at number 36 on the UK Rock & Metal Singles Chart.)	RIAA: Gold	The Sound of Madness
"Bully"	2012	94	—	12	1	3	—	—	—	—	— (Note: "Bully" did not enter the UK Singles Chart, but peaked at number 11 on the UK Rock & Metal Singles Chart.)	RIAA: Gold	Amaryllis
"Unity"	2012	—	—	22	1	9	—	—	—	—	—		Amaryllis
"Enemies"	2012	—	—	29	2	29	—	—	—	—	—	MC: Gold	Amaryllis
"I'll Follow You"	2013	—	—	31	2	25	—	—	—	—	—		Amaryllis
"Adrenaline"	2013	—	—	—	4	—	—	—	—	—	—		Amaryllis
"Cut the Cord"	2015	— (Note: "Cut the Cord" did not enter the Billboard Hot 100, but peaked at number 4 on the Bubbling Under Hot 100 Singles chart.)	—	34	1	10	—	—	—	—	—	RIAA: Platinum; MC: Platinum; RMNZ: Gold	Threat to Survival
"State of My Head"	2015	—	—	25	1	19	—	—	—	—	—	RIAA: Gold; MC: Gold	Threat to Survival
"Asking for It"	2016	—	—	—	2	27	—	—	—	—	—		Threat to Survival
"How Did You Love"	2016	—	—	—	1	17	—	—	—	—	—	MC: Gold	Threat to Survival
"Devil"	2018	— (Note: "Devil" did not enter the Billboard Hot 100, but peaked at number 21 on the Bubbling Under Hot 100 Singles chart.)	—	—	1	9	—	—	—	—	—	RIAA: Gold; MC: Platinum	Attention Attention
"Get Up"	2018	—	30	23	1	12	—	—	—	—	—		Attention Attention
"Monsters"	2019	—	—	—	1	10	—	—	—	—	—	RIAA: Platinum; MC: Gold	Attention Attention
"Attention Attention"	2019	—	—	—	1	30	—	—	—	—	—		Attention Attention
"Atlas Falls"	2020	— (Note: "Atlas Falls" did not enter the Billboard Hot 100, but peaked at number 6 on the US Digital Song Sales chart.)	—	—	1	6	—	—	—	—	— (Note: "Atlas Falls" did not enter the UK Singles Chart, but peaked at number 40 on the UK Singles Sales Chart.)		Non-album single
"Planet Zero"	2022	—	—	36	1	28	—	—	—	—	—		Planet Zero
"Daylight"	2022	—	31	22	1	31	—	—	—	—	—		Planet Zero
"Dead Don't Die"	2023	—	—	—	2	— (Note: "Dead Don't Die" did not enter the Hot Rock & Alternative Songs chart, but peaked at number 3 on the Rock Airplay chart.)	—	—	—	—	—		Planet Zero
"A Symptom of Being Human"	2023	— (Note: "A Symptom of Being Human" did not enter the Billboard Hot 100, but peaked at number 46 on the Radio Songs chart.)	15	8	1	17	—	—	—	—	—		Planet Zero
"Three Six Five" / "Dance, Kid, Dance"	2025	— (Note: "Three Six Five" did not enter the Hot 100, but peaked at number 10 on the US Digital Songs chart.)	12	3	34	30	—	—	— (Note: "Three Six Five" did not enter the Canadian Hot 100, but peaked at number 29 on the Canada Mainstream Rock chart.)	—	— (Note: "Three Six Five/Dance, Kid, Dance" did not enter the UK Singles Chart, but peaked at number 45 on the UK Singles Sales Chart.)		Ei8ht
"Three Six Five" / "Dance, Kid, Dance"	2025	— (Note: "Dance, Kid, Dance" did not enter the Hot 100, but peaked at number 20 on the US Digital Songs chart.)	—	—	1	36	—	—	—	—	—		Ei8ht
"Killing Fields"	2025	—	—	39	1	—	—	—	—	—	—		Ei8ht
"Searchlight"	2025	— (Note: "Searchlight" did not enter the Hot 100, but peaked at number 15 on the US Digital Songs chart.)	—	—	1	37	—	—	—	—	— (Note: "Searchlight" did not enter the UK Singles Chart, but peaked at number 95 on the UK Singles Sales Chart.)		Ei8ht
"Safe and Sound"	2026	—	—	—	1	—	—	—	—	—	—		Ei8ht
"Young Again"	2026	—	—	18	1	— (Note: "Young Again" did not enter the Hot Rock and Alternative Songs, but peaked at number 1 on the US Hot Hard Rock Songs chart.)	—	—	—	—	—		Ei8ht
"—" denotes a recording that did not chart or was not released in that territory.

=== Promotional singles/Other Charted and Certified songs ===
List of promotional singles as lead artist, with selected chart positions and certifications, showing year released and album name
Title	Year	Peak chart positions			Certifications	Album
Title	Year	US Hard Rock Dig.	US Hard Rock	US Rock	Certifications	Album
"Happy X-Mas (War Is Over)"	2006	—	—	—		Non-album single
"Call Me"	2008	—	—	—	RIAA: Gold; MC: Gold	The Sound of Madness
"Breaking Inside" (original or feat. Lzzy Hale)	2008	—	—	—		The Sound of Madness
"Amaryllis"	2012	—	—	—		Amaryllis
"Miracle"	2012	5	—	—		Amaryllis
"Through the Ghost"	2012	—	—	—		Amaryllis
"Black Cadillac"	2015	4	—	—		Threat to Survival
"Outcast"	2015	13	—	—		Threat to Survival
"Dangerous"	2015	—	—	—		Threat to Survival
"Thick as Thieves"	2015	—	—	—		Threat to Survival
"The Human Radio"	2018	9	—	36		Attention Attention
"Black Soul"	2018	24	—	—		Attention Attention
"Kill Your Conscience"	2018	—	—	—		Attention Attention
"Creatures"	2018	—	—	—		Attention Attention
"The Saints of Violence and Innuendo"	2022	15	14	—		Planet Zero
"Sure Is Fun"	2022	—	—	—		Planet Zero
"Dysfunctional You"	2022	23	23	—		Planet Zero
"Outlaw"	2026	1	17	—		Ei8ht
"Burning Down the Disco"	2026	—	21	—		Ei8ht
"At the Bottom"	2026	—	19	—		Ei8ht
"Dizzy"	2026	—	20	—		Ei8ht
"—" denotes a recording that did not chart or was not released in that territory.

== Video albums ==
List of video albums as lead artist, with certifications, showing year released and album name
Title	Video details	Certifications
Live from the Inside	Released: August 23, 2005; Label: Atlantic; Format: DVD	
The Sight of Madness	Released: November 17, 2009; Label: Atlantic; Format: Digital download	
The Sound of Madness (deluxe version - Bonus DVD)	Released: November 23, 2010; Label: Atlantic; Format: DVD	
Somewhere in the Stratosphere	Released: May 3, 2011; Label: Atlantic; Format: 2CD + 2DVD	RIAA: Gold
Attention Attention	Released: September 3, 2021; Label: Atlantic, Gravitas Ventures; Format: Digital download, on demand	

== Music videos ==
List of music videos, showing director(s) and year released
Title	Year	Director
"45"	2003	Glen Bennett
"Simple Man"	2004	Christopher Mills
"Save Me"	2005	Marc Klasfeld
"Lady So Divine"	2006	Shawn Geer
"Devour"	2008	Darren Doane
"Second Chance"	2008	Ryan Smith
"Sound of Madness"	2009	Darren Doane
"If You Only Knew"	2009	Ryan Smith
"What a Shame"	2010	Cat Solen
"The Crow & the Butterfly"	2010	Hannah Lux Davis
"Diamond Eyes (Boom-Lay Boom-Lay Boom)"	2010	Unknown
"Breaking Inside"	2011	from live footage broadcast
"Bully"	2012	Darren Doane
"Unity"	2012	Darren Doane
"Enemies"	2012	Darren Doane
"I'll Follow You"	2013	Darren Doane and John Stevens
"Adrenaline"	2013	Rob Fenn
"Through the Ghost"	2014	Unknown
"Cut the Cord"	2015	Darren Doane
"State of My Head"	2015	Unknown
"Asking for It"	2016	Stephen Smith
"How Did You Love"	2016	N.D. Wilson
"I'll Follow You" (alternate video)	2017	Unknown
"Devil"	2018	Bill Yukich
"The Human Radio"	2018	Bill Yukich
"Get Up"	2018	Bill Yukich
"Monsters"	2019	Bill Yukich
"Attention Attention"	2019	Bill Yukich
"Planet Zero"	2022	Charles De Meyer
"Daylight"	2022	Sanjay Parikh Media
"Dead Don't Die"	2023	Lewis Cater
"A Symptom of Being Human"	2023	Lewis Cater
"Black Soul"	2024 (Note: The music videos for "Black Soul", "Kill Your Conscience", "Pyro", "Evolve", "Creatures", "Special", "Brilliant", and "Darkside" were originally released as part of the "Attention Attention" film in 2021, but were released individually in 2024.)	Bill Yukich
"Kill Your Conscience"	2024	Bill Yukich
"Pyro"	2024	Bill Yukich
"Evolve"	2024	Bill Yukich
"Creatures"	2024	Bill Yukich
"Special"	2024	Bill Yukich
"Brilliant"	2024	Bill Yukich
"Darkside"	2024	Bill Yukich
"Dance, Kid, Dance"	2025	Lewis Cater
"Three Six Five" (animated video)	2025	Toon53 Productions
"Three Six Five"	2025	Carter Louthian
"Killing Fields"	2025	Carter Louthian
"Searchlight"	2025	Andrew Donoho
"Young Again"	2026	Andrew Donoho
"Safe and Sound"	2026	Vlad Iksvyshch

== Other songs ==
Title	Year	From
"So You Know"	—	Unreleased demo
"One" (U2 cover)	2005	Us and Them (deluxe edition)
"Tie Your Mother Down" (Queen cover)	2005	Killer Queen: A Tribute to Queen
"Dirthouse" (Dreve cover)	2006	Masters of Horror (soundtrack) Volume 2
"Happy Xmas (War Is Over)" (John Lennon cover)	2006	"Happy Xmas (War Is Over) single"
"Nutshell" (live Alice in Chains cover with Seether)	2006	The 97X Green Room: Volume 2
"Be the Same"	2007	Unreleased demo
"Sitting on the Dock of the Bay"	2008	Live Otis Redding cover
"Junkies for Fame"	2008	The Sound of Madness 2010 deluxe reissue and featured on Rock Band
"Her Name Is Alice"	2010	Almost Alice and The Sound of Madness 2010 deluxe reissue
"The Underground"	2011	Amaryllis outtake
"I'm Alive"	2012	Avengers Assemble
"I Feel the Earth Move" (live Carole King cover)	2013	The Warner Sound Live Room EP
"Breathe"	2015	Threat to Survival outtake
"Never Gonna Let Go" and "Reject"	2015	Threat to Survival Japanese edition bonus tracks
"Headcase" and "ANWTD (A New Way to Die)"	2018	Attention Attention Walmart & Japanese edition bonus tracks
"Little Drummer Boy"	2019	Music Choice Originals - Sounds of the Seasons 2019
"Christmas Time Is Here" (acoustic cover)	2020	98 Rock Baltimore
"Back to the Living"	2022	Planet Zero cut
