= Somewhere in the Stratosphere =

Live album by Shinedown
- Released: May 3, 2011
- Recorded: 2010, Washington State, Kansas City
- Genre: Hard rock; alternative metal; post-grunge; alternative rock
- Length: 2:35:23
- Label: Atlantic

Shinedown chronology
iTunes Session (2010)	Somewhere in the Stratosphere (2011)	Amaryllis (2012)

Somewhere in the Stratosphere is a two-CD/two-DVD package released by the American rock band Shinedown. It contains two full recordings of the "Live from Washington State" performance from the Carnival of Madness tour, and the Kansas City performance from the Anything and Everything Acoustic tour. The two DVDs contain the same tracks as the CDs. The album debuted at No. 83 on the U.S. Billboard 200. The album title is derived from a lyric in the song "Second Chance".

== Track listing ==
=== Disc 1: Live from Washington State (Electric Show) ===
No.	Title	Writer(s)	Length
1.	"Intro (Scary Fairy)"	Tom Jemmott, Brent Smith, Dave Bassett	1:02
2.	"Sound of Madness"	Brent Smith, Dave Bassett	3:56
3.	"Devour"	Brent Smith, Dave Bassett	3:56
4.	"I Dare You"	Brent Smith, Tony Battaglia, Brad Stewart	3:43
5.	"Cyanide Sweet Tooth Suicide"	Brent Smith, Dave Bassett	3:37
6.	"If You Only Knew"	Brent Smith, Dave Bassett	3:48
7.	"Diamond Eyes (Boom-Lay Boom-Lay Boom)"	Brent Smith, Eric Bass, Zach Myers	5:41
8.	"45"	Brent Smith, Tony Battaglia	5:17
9.	"Burning Bright"	Brent Smith, Tony Battaglia	3:53
10.	"Heroes"	Brent Smith, Tony Battaglia, Jasin Todd	3:30
11.	"The Crow & the Butterfly"	Brent Smith, Dave Bassett	4:16
12.	"Her Name Is Alice"	Brent Smith, Dave Bassett, Eric Bass	5:05
13.	"Save Me"	Brent Smith, Tony Battaglia	3:31
14.	"Left Out"	Brent Smith, Brad Stewart, Jasin Todd	5:54
15.	"Simple Man" (Lynyrd Skynyrd cover)	Gary Rossington, Ronnie Van Zant	7:35
16.	"Fly from the Inside"	Brent Smith, Bob Marlette	5:39
17.	"Second Chance"	Brent Smith, Dave Bassett	5:38
Total length:			1:16:04

=== Disc 2: Live from Kansas City (Acoustic Show) ===
No.	Title	Writer(s)	Length
1.	"Heroes"	Brent Smith, Tony Battaglia, Jasin Todd	8:08
2.	"Save Me"	Brent Smith, Tony Battaglia	3:40
3.	"If You Only Knew"	Brent Smith, Dave Bassett	3:55
4.	"Sound of Madness"	Brent Smith, Dave Bassett	4:35
5.	"Shed Some Light"	Brent Smith	4:41
6.	"45"	Brent Smith, Tony Battaglia	6:12
7.	"I Dare You"	Brent Smith, Tony Battaglia, Brad Stewart	4:30
8.	"Times Like These" (Foo Fighters cover)	Dave Grohl	4:07
9.	"The Crow & the Butterfly"	Brent Smith, Dave Bassett	4:36
10.	"Burning Bright"	Brent Smith, Tony Battaglia	3:56
11.	"Devour"	Brent Smith, Dave Bassett	3:53
12.	"Call Me"	Brent Smith, Dave Bassett	4:41
13.	"Fly from the Inside"	Brent Smith, Bob Marlette	5:36
14.	"With a Little Help from My Friends" (The Beatles cover)	Paul McCartney, John Lennon	5:29
15.	"Simple Man" (Lynyrd Skynyrd Cover)	Gary Rossington, Ronnie Van Zant	6:14
16.	"Second Chance"	Brent Smith, Dave Bassett	5:06
Total length:			1:19:20

== Personnel ==
- Brent Smith – lead vocals
- Zach Myers – guitar, backing vocals
- Eric Bass – bass guitar, piano, additional guitar, backing vocals
- Barry Kerch – drums
- Brandon "The Bear" Alanis – (drum tech) xylophone, vibes, percussion, shakers, lap steel guitar, backing vocals
- Ryan (Zilla) Ashurst – (bass tech) bass guitar
- Alan Price – second guitar, backing vocals

Also Will Hoge joins the band for the song "With a Little Help from My Friends", with a horn section. The horn section is not noted in the credits.

== Charts ==
Chart (2011)	Peak position
US Billboard 200	83
US Top Rock Albums (Billboard)	21
