= ITunes Session (Shinedown EP) =

iTunes Session

EP by Shinedown
- Released: April 06, 2010
- Genre: Hard rock; alternative metal; post-grunge; alternative rock
- Length: 31:06
- Label: Atlantic

Shinedown chronology
The Sound of Madness (2008)	''iTunes Session'' (2010)	Somewhere in the Stratosphere (2011)

Shinedown iTunes Session is part of the iTunes Originals series of releases. Unlike the others in this series there are no interviews, and it is an EP. All tracks are originally from Shinedown's third studio album, The Sound of Madness.

== Track listing ==
All tracks written by Brent Smith and Dave Bassett

No.	Title	Length
1.	"The Crow & the Butterfly"	4:19
2.	"Breaking Inside"	3:49
3.	"Sound of Madness"	3:58
4.	"Second Chance"	3:43
5.	"If You Only Knew"	3:57
6.	"Call Me"	3:43
7.	"What a Shame"	4:12
8.	"Devour"	3:25
Total length:		31:06

== Personnel ==
- Brent Smith - lead vocals
- Zach Myers - guitar, backing vocals
- Eric Bass - bass guitar, piano, backup vocals
- Barry Kerch - drums

== Charts ==
Chart performance for iTunes Session
Chart (2011)	Peak position
US Billboard 200	118
US Top Rock & Alternative Albums (Billboard)	35
