= 2009 in rock music =

This article summarizes events related to rock music for the year of 2009.

== Notable events ==
=== January ===
- Shinedown's single "Second Chance", in a run that starts late December 2008, tops the US Billboard Mainstream Rock Songs chart. The song finds crossover success as well, peaking at number 7 on the US Billboard all-format Hot 100 chart, the band's highest to date. The song later goes triple platinum in the US as well.
- Nickelback's sixth studio album, Dark Horse, released in November 2008, stays in the top 5 of the US all-format Billboard 200 chart for the entire month of January.
- Scottish band Franz Ferdinand releases their third studio album, Tonight: Franz Ferdinand. It debuts in the top 10 of fourteen separate countries all-format album charts in its first week of release, including hitting number 2 on the UK album chart.
- The Offspring single "You're Gonna Go Far, Kid" finds cross-over success, peaking at number 63 on the Billboard Hot 100 chart. The band would not have any songs break on the chart in the decade following.

=== February ===
- The Fray releases their second studio album, The Fray. It tops the Billboard 200 chart, selling 179,000 copies in its opening week. The album holds on to the fourth places slot in its second week, and even rises to the third place spot in its third week.
- Coldplay's 2008 album, Viva La Vida or Death and All His Friends receives a 271% increase in sales after the album wins three Grammy Awards, making it the eightieth best selling album of the week, selling another 31,000 copies.
- Plant and Krauss (featuring Robert Plant of Led Zeppelin and folk rock musician Alison Krauss) receives a 715% increase in sales after it wins the Grammy Award for Album of the Year".
- Nickelback's Dark Horse album, after being bumped out of the top 10 of the Billboard 200 for a week for the first time of the year due to the bump in sales from Grammy Award winners, again returns to the top 10 for multiple weeks.
- Lamb of God releases their sixth studio album, Wrath. It debuts at number 2 on the Billboard 200 chart, a career best for the band, selling 68,000 copies in its opening week.
- Framing Hanley's rock cover of "Lollipop" breaks onto the Billboard Hot 100 chart, peaking at 86. It would be the band's only song to ever appear on the chart.

=== March ===
- Irish rock band U2 releases their twelfth studio album, No Line on the Horizon. It tops the album charts of over 20 countries, including the US, where it debuted atop of the Billboard 200 chart, selling 484,000 copies in its first week. It is the band's seventh album to top the chart at the time, and one of the highest debuts of the year. It goes on to be the eighteenth best selling album of 2009 in the US.
- Chris Cornell (Soundgarden, Audioslave) releases his third and final solo album, Scream. The album is controversial in its direction, with Cornell opting to collaborate with Timbaland to create a more electronic sound. The album debuts at number 10 on the Billboard 200 chart, selling 26,000 copies in its opening week.
- New Found Glory releases their sixth studio album, Not Without a Fight. It is their first on an independent record label, and tops Billboard's indie album chart. It places at number 12 overall on the Billboard 200 chart, moving 23,000 copies.

=== April ===
- Silversun Pickups release their second studio album, Swoon. It debuts at number 7 on the Billboard 200, selling 43,000 copies, both selling and charting higher than their debut album.
- The Tragically Hip release their eleventh studio album, We Are the Same. It tops the Billboard Canadian Albums Chart upon its release week. It is their eighth album to top the Canadian albums chart.
- Depeche Mode releases their twelfth studio album, Sounds of the Universe. It debuts at number 3 on the Billboard 200, selling 80,000 copies. It is their highest charting album since 1993, even though their prior four album had all sold more.
- Papa Roach's single "Lifeline" tops the Billboard Mainstream Rock songs chart, and stays there for six consecutive weeks.

=== May ===
- Green Day releases their eighth studio album, 21st Century Breakdown. It tops the Billboard 200 chart, selling 215,000 copies, despite only being released for three of the days in the week's tracking period. In its second week, it holds on to the second place spot on the chart, selling another 166,000 copies, and continues to appear in the top 10 of the chart into June.
- Green Day's single "Know Your Enemy" tops the Billboard Mainstream Rock song chart for three weeks straight.
- Fall Out Boy's pop punk single "America's Suitehearts" charts on the Billboard all-format Hot 100 chart, despite not charting on any Billboard rock or alternative charts. Its eventually certified Gold by the RIAA, indicating half a million copies sold.
- Marilyn Manson releases his seventh studio album, The High End of Low. It debuts at number 4 on the Billboard 200, selling 49,000, almost half the first week sales of his prior album, Eat Me, Drink Me, in 2007.
- American indie rock band Grizzly Bear releases their third studio album, Veckatimest. It debuts at number 8 on the Billboard 200 chart, selling 33,000 copies. It is the band's first album to place anywhere on the top 200 of the chart.
- Manic Street Preachers release their ninth studio album, Journal for Plague Lovers. It peaked at number 3 on the UK albums chart and was certified silver.

=== June ===
- Shinedown's single "Sound of Madness" tops the Billboard Mainstream Rock chart for 3 weeks. Additionally, the song finds crossover success, charting at number 85 on the Billboard all-format Hot 100 chart, and eventually being certified platinum by the RIAA, indicating 1 million units sold.
- Linkin Park single "New Divide", which releases as a tie-in to the blockbuster film Transformers: Revenge of the Fallen, finds cross-over success, peaking at number 6 on the Billboard all-format Hot 100 chart.
- Dave Matthews Band releases their seventh studio album, Big Whiskey and the GrooGrux King. It tops the Billboard 200 chart in its first week of release, selling 424,000 copies. It is one of the biggest album debuts of the year, and is their fifth consecutive studio album to top the chart. It holds on to the second place spot in its second week as well, selling another 128,000 copies.
- 311 releases their ninth studio album, Uplifter. It debuts at number 3 on the Billboard 200 chart, selling 60,000 copies in its first week. Its the highest charting position of the band's career, but concurrently their lowest sales for an album release since 1995.
- Taking Back Sunday releases studio album New Again. It debuts at number 7 on the Billboard 200, selling 48,000 copies.
- Incubus releases their greatest hits album, Monuments and Melodies. It peaks at number 5 on the Billboard 200 chart, selling 70,000 copies in its opening week.
- Australian progressive rock band Karnivool releases their second studio album, Sound Awake. It is the second best selling album of the week upon its release on the Australian all-format ARIA albums chart.
- Kasabian releases their third studio album West Ryder Pauper Lunatic Asylum.It tops the UK all-format album's chart for two weeks. Its their second of five albums to top the chart.
- Matchbox 20 frontman Rob Thomas releases his second studio album, Cradlesong. It debuts at number 2 on the Billboard 200, selling 122,000 copies in its first week.
- Killswitch Engage releases their fifth studio album, and second self-titled album, Killswitch Engage. It debuts at number 7 on the Billboard 200, selling 58,000 copies in its opening week.

=== July ===
- Nickelback's single "If Today Was Your Last Day" peaks at number 19 on the Billboard Hot 100 all-format chart.
- All Time Low releases their third studio album, Nothing Personal. It debuts at number 4 on the Billboard 200, selling 63,000 copies in its first week, a career best for the band.
- Daughtry releases their second studio album, Leave This Town. It tops the Billboard 200 chart, selling 269,000 copies in its opening week. Its his second album to top the chart, but only his first to debut at number one on the chart. The album holds on to the second place spot on the chart in its second week, selling an additional 101,000 copies, and stays in the top 10 into August weeks.
- The Dead Weather (featuring Jack White of The White Stripes and Alison Mosshart of The Kills) release their debut album Horehound. It debuts at number 6 on the Billboard 200, selling 51,000 copies in its first week.

=== August ===
- Third Eye Blind releases their fourth studio album, Ursa Major, their first in six years. It debuts at number 3 on the Billboard 200 chart, selling 51,000 copies. It is the highest first week debut for the band, though not their best selling album.
- Skillet releases their seventh studio album Awake. It debuts at number 2 on the Billboard 200 chart, a career high for the band, selling 68,000 copies in its first week.
- Chevelle releases their fifth studio album, Sci-Fi Crimes. It debuts at number 6, selling 46,000 copies.
- The Used releases their fourth studio album, Artwork. It debuts at number 10, selling 35,000 copies.

=== September ===
- Pearl Jam releases their ninth studio album, Backspacer. It tops the Billboard 200 chart, selling 189,000 copies in its opening week. It is the bands fourth album to top the chart, and their first album to top the chart in 13 years.
- Three Days Grace releases their third studio album, Life Starts Now. It debuts at number 3 on the Billboard 200 chart, selling 79,000 copies in its opening week.
- Muse releases their fifth studio album, The Resistance. It debuts at number 3 on the Billboard 200, selling 128,000 copies, their best debut at the time.
- Five Finger Death Punch releases their second studio album, War is the Answer. It debuts at number 7, selling 44,000 copies in its opening week. Their debut album never peaked any higher than 107 on the chart the year prior.
- Paramore releases their third studio album, Brand New Eyes. It debuts at number 2 on the Billboard 200 chart, selling 175,000 copies. The album had been projected to top the US sales chart, and missed the spot by just 5,000 copies.
- Breaking Benjamin releases their fourth studio album, Dear Agony. It debuts at number 4, selling 134,000 copies in its first week, the band's best performance at the time.
- Alice In Chains release their album Black Gives Way to Blue. It debuts at number 5 on the Billboard 200, selling 126,000 copies. It is the band's first new album since the death of their original vocalist, Layne Staley, and their first to feature new vocalist William DuVall.

=== October ===
- The Twilight New Moon soundtrack tops the Billboard 200 chart, selling 115,000 copies in its opening week. The soundtrack features contributions from a number of rock bands and musicians, including Death Cab for Cutie, The Killers, Thom Yorke, Muse, and Band of Skulls.
- Creed releases their reunion album their fourth studio album, Full Circle. The album, their first in 8 years, debuts at number 2 on the Billboard 200 chart, selling 110,000 copies in its first week. It fares considerbly worse than their prior album, Weathered, which debuts with 887,000 copies sold in its first week of sale in 2001.

=== November ===
- The Foo Fighters song, "Wheels" finds crossover success, peaking at number 72 on the Billboard Hot 100 all format songs chart. Recorded alongside music producer Butch Vig, the song is such a success that it inspires the band to record an entire album with Vig, leading to 2011's chart topping Wasting Light album.
- Saving Abel have a crossover top 40 hit with their song "Addicted", which peaks at number 20 on the Billboard Hot 100 chart. It is their first and only song to chart on the all-format chart.
- Them Crooked Vultures, a rock supergroup consisting of Dave Grohl of the Foo Fighters, Josh Homme of Queens of the Stone Age, and John Paul Jones of Led Zeppelin, release their only studio album to date, Them Crooked Vultures. It reaches the top 10 of seven separate national all-format album charts.
- UK band Snow Patrol releases their greatest hits album Up to Now. It charts in the top 10 of six separate national all-format album charts.
- Weezer releases their seventh studio album, Raditude. It debuts at number seven on the Billboard 200 chart, selling 66,000 copies in its opening week.

=== December ===
- In protest of X-Factor's saccharine pop music dominance in the UK around Christmas, a fan campaign is started to get Rage Against the Machine's 1992 protest song "Killing in the Name" to top the singles chart. The campaign is successful, making it officially the number one Christmas song in the UK for 2009.

=== Year end ===
- Shinedown occupies the top two spots for the 2009 year-end chart for the Billboard Mainstream Rock songs chart, "Second Chance" and "Sound of Madness" respectively. The third most popular song is Mudvayne's "Do What You Do".

== Deaths ==
- Les Paul of the Gibson Les Paul

== Band breakups ==
- Oasis
- The Verve
