= Asking for It =

Asking for It may refer to:

- "Asking for It" (Hole song), a song by Hole from the 1994 album Live Through This
- "Asking for It" (Shinedown song), a song by Shinedown from the 2016 album Threat to Survival
- "Asking 4 It", a song by Gwen Stefani from the 2016 album This Is What the Truth Feels Like
- Asking For It (novel), a 2015 novel by Irish author Louise O'Neill, as well as the play based on the novel
- Asking for It (film), a 2022 film with Vanessa Hudgens

== See also ==
- Victim blaming
