= Monsters (Shinedown song) =

Single by Shinedown

from the album Attention Attention
- Released: March 1, 2019
- Recorded: 2017–2018
- Genre: Rock
- Length: 4:08
- Label: Atlantic
- Songwriters: Brent Smith; Eric Bass
- Producer: Eric Bass

Shinedown singles chronology
"Get Up" (2018)	"Monsters" (2019)	"Attention Attention" (2019)

Music video
- "Monsters" on YouTube

"Monsters" is a song by American rock band Shinedown. It was their third single from their sixth studio album Attention Attention. It reached the top of the Billboard Mainstream Rock Songs chart in June 2019. Upon reaching number one on the Mainstream Rock, Shinedown moved into second place for the most Mainstream Rock number ones with fourteen songs. "Monsters" was nominated for iHeartRadio's rock song of the year award.

== Background ==
The song was released in March 2019, as the third single from the band's studio album Attention Attention, after "Devil" and "Get Up". In April 2019, Billboard noted that the song had become the band's twenty fifth top-ten song on the Mainstream Rock Songs chart. As of June 2019, it had reached number two on the chart, and it topped it for a week in July. The band teased a music video for the song as early as July 2018, though one wasn't released until June 2019. On July 2, 2019, the band released an animated video for the song.

== Themes and composition ==
Attention Attention is a concept album, that, from beginning to end of the album, "charts the life of an individual protagonist from excruciating lows to searing highs”, with the track appearing at the mid-point of the album. Smith states that the song was influenced by his past struggles with alcoholism and substance abuse that he struggled with around The Sound of Madness era of the band, stating:

"Everyone who knows a bit of my background with regard to substance abuse and alcoholism knows that I've battled with it. It's something I deal with on a daily basis. I've always been very honest about it, which is that I didn't do drugs today – and I didn't drink today – but I don't know what I'll do tomorrow, because I literally have to take it day by day. I never went to rehab, I didn't do a 12-step programme, and I don't talk about sobriety unless I'm asked about it. Even then, I don't spend much time on it because I literally live my life day by day. That's how I have to do it, but the dynamic in the song is not just about substance abuse. It's about a lot of different situations that people get put in because they have things in their mind that – for whatever reason – they used to sabotage themselves. They don't know why they do it, but they do it, and these are the monsters that I'm talking about: those voices that say, 'I know this is going to be really fucked up after it's over with, but let's do it anyway.' That's the sentiment in the song, when I sing that 'my monsters are real and they're trained to kill.'"

Smith similarly noted the song was influenced by his self-awareness of the issue, and his belief that despite his control of his sobriety, he feels that just one drink of alcohol could lead him straight back into binge drinking and causing trouble.

While critics saw much of the Attention Attention as an attempt to cater to the fans of modern pop bands like Imagine Dragons, "Monsters" was noted as sounding like more of the classic Shinedown sound.

== Personnel ==
Band

- Brent Smith – vocals
- Zach Myers – guitar
- Eric Bass – bass
- Barry Kerch – drums

== Charts ==
In June 2019, "Monsters" peaked at number one on the Billboard Mainstream Rock. The song gave Shinedown their fourteenth number one and moved the band to second for the most Mainstream Rock number ones.

=== Weekly charts ===
Chart (2019–2020)	Peak position
Canada Rock (Billboard)	34
US Hot Rock & Alternative Songs (Billboard)	10
US Rock & Alternative Airplay (Billboard)	7

=== Year-end charts ===
Chart (2019)	Position
US Hot Rock Songs (Billboard)	39
US Rock Airplay (Billboard)	34

== Certifications ==
Region	Certification	Certified units/sales
Canada (Music Canada)	Gold	40,000^{‡}
United States (RIAA)	Platinum	1,000,000^{‡}
^{‡} Sales+streaming figures based on certification alone.
