= What a Shame =

What a Shame may refer to:

- "What a Shame" (Shinedown song), a song by Shinedown on their 2008 album The Sound of Madness
- "What a Shame", a song by The Rolling Stones on their 1965 album The Rolling Stones No. 2
- "What a Shame", a song from Lizzy McAlpine's album Five Seconds Flat (2022)
