= Attention Attention =

Studio album by Shinedown
- Released: May 4, 2018
- Recorded: 2016–2018
- Studio: Ocean Industries Studios (Charleston, South Carolina)
- Genres: Hard rock; pop rock; alternative rock; arena rock
- Length: 50:31
- Label: Atlantic
- Producer: Eric Bass

Shinedown chronology
Threat to Survival (2015)	Attention Attention (2018)	Planet Zero (2022)

Singles from Attention Attention
- 1. "Devil" Released: March 7, 2018; 2. "Get Up" Released: August 8, 2018; 3. "Monsters" Released: March 1, 2019; 4. "Attention Attention" Released: September 24, 2019

Attention Attention is the sixth studio album by American rock band Shinedown. It was released on May 4, 2018, through Atlantic Records. It is a concept album, depicting an individual overcoming negativity and related problems to be reborn as a new person. The first single, "Devil", was released on March 7, 2018. The first promotional single, "The Human Radio", was released on April 6, 2018. The second single, "Get Up", was released on August 8, 2018. The third single, "Monsters" was released on March 1, 2019. The fourth single, "Attention Attention" was released on September 24, 2019. All four singles reached number one on the US Billboard Mainstream Rock Songs chart. The album was certified Gold by both the RIAA and Music Canada.

== Writing and recording ==
Initial work on the album began in late 2016, after the band had finished the tour in support of their prior album, Threat to Survival. In February 2017, Smith announced that they had begun work on their sixth studio album. Bass had been working on writing 22 separate pieces of music over the course of their 2016 tour, separate from the rest of the band, who wanted to just concentrate on touring. Bass had just begun presenting the material to Smith, who, while unsure how much exactly would go into the future album, did say that he was very impressed, and that the material may fit together into a concept album, a first for the band. They joined Iron Maiden on tour in Europe in April and May, and began recording soon after. Upon the resuming work on the album and beginning work in the studio, the band decided to actually only use one of the 22 originally proposed songs by Bass, but the work of the original 22 songs still inspired them to press forward in sticking with the concept album idea overall, just with different songs.

In January 2018, Myers announced that the band had finished the recording the album and that Bass was working on finalizing the production and mixing of the album.

== Themes and composition ==
Attention Attention has been described as hard rock, pop rock, alternative rock, and arena rock, with electronic elements. The sound of the album has been compared to bands like Imagine Dragons, Awolnation, and X Ambassadors. Attention Attention is a concept album. The album tells a story of an individual in a very negative mental and emotional place and, over the course of the fourteen songs, has them work through their issues, becoming a completely changed person by the end of the last song. Smith outlined the album's progression:

"At the beginning of the record, you can feel this intensity and these bold statements that are being made, but as the record progresses, you hear the individual and the record start to shift, and they start to get their confidence back, and they start to understand what's going on, because they're having to face emotions that they've never really faced before. We call it digging in the dirt mentally. This person has to flush it out. In order to be able to get out of this room and out of this chair and go back into the world, they have to train themselves mentally. They have to accept the fact that it's not always going to be great. It's not always going to be exactly the way you want it."

Myers also described the album's sound as "heavier than Threat to Survival".

== Release and promotion ==
The band tentatively planned to finish the album in late 2017, release a first single in January 2018, and then release the album in April. Plans were eventually pushed back; on March 7, 2018, the title was revealed and the album was announced for release on May 4, and its first single "Devil", was released. The band announced that there would be a video created for every song on the album, and that the video project would be led by Bill Yukich, the lead editor on Beyoncé's Lemonade film for HBO. The band also embarked on a co-headlining tour with Godsmack to promote the release, as part of Live Nation's "Ticket to Rock" program of tours.

On April 5, a second song, "The Human Radio" was released as a promotional single, accompanied by a music video. On August 8, "Get Up" was released as the second single, accompanied by a music video. A third single for the song "Monsters" was released to radio on March 1, 2019 followed by a music video. Later, an animated video for the song was also released. A fourth single for the song "Attention Attention" was released on September 24, 2019 followed by a music video. All four songs have made it to the top of the Active Rock Charts. The band plans to release a video for every song on the album.

The band released a film based on the album. The film was directed by Bill Yukich and was released on September 3, 2021.

== Critical reception ==
Professional ratings
Aggregate scores
Source	Rating
Metacritic	75/100
Review scores
Source	Rating
AllMusic	4/5 stars
Altwire	B−
Classic Rock	4/5 stars
Distorted Sound	9/10
Kerrang!	3/5
Metal Hammer	3.5/5 stars
Music Existence	4.6/5 stars
Rock 'N' Load	10/10
Salute	4/5 stars
Sputnikmusic	4/5 stars

Attention Attention received generally positive reviews from critics. At Metacritic, which assigns a normalized rating out of 100 to reviews from mainstream critics, the album has an average score of 75 out of 100, which indicates "Generally favorable reviews" based on 4 reviews. AllMusic described the album as "expertly crafted" album that "maintain[s] high energy on 14 tracks of fuel-injected might", concluding that it was a "fun, engaging ride" that "maintain[s] Shinedown's power". Mark Stoneman, writing for Altwire said, "Attention Attention is an easy step up from the band’s previous effort and offers something that is generally fun and rewarding; it’s nothing revolutionary or ground-breaking, but then it was never going to be."

Jessica Howkins, writing for Distorted Sound, stated that "Shinedown have released their best album to date." Howkins calls the album "incredible, raw and strong with very minor flaws." Joshua Leep, writing for Salute, commenting, "the overall vibe of Attention Attention still has that slightly dated mid/late 2000s post-grunge vibe to it. Leep also said, rather than recycling an old sound...Shinedown manage[s] to use this sound to drive home the message of the album even further."

The Sputnik Music staff review described the album as the band's true follow up to The Sound of Madness (2008), stating that "There were moments on Amaryllis (2012) – and certainly throughout Threat to Survival (2015) – that Smith’s talents were underutilized, misplaced, and flat-out squandered...with Attention Attention placing the impetus behind Shinedown’s aggressive rock tendencies, Brent Smith is back in his element in a way that hasn’t happened since, well, The Sound of Madness...they both excel at balancing the group’s heavy, southern-rock roots with their infectious pop-sensibilities." Matt Mills, writing for Metal Hammer, was a little less positive calling songs like "Black Soul" and "Kill Your Conscience" "hilarity-inducing head-scratchers." Mills was more positive towards songs like "Devil", "Evolve", and "Brilliant" saying, "the anthems’ bouncing energy already feels destined to ignite live crowds." Music Existence wrote, "overall, it’s a very interesting concept to explore in an album, and one that many listeners can relate to."

Rock 'N' Load complimented the production and saying "[it will leave] you to enjoy every nuance." Classic Rock gave the album a positive review saying that the album is "punchier" and "angrier even, than previous records." Kerrang! was a little less positive writing, "a couple of tracks...could probably have been left on the side of the road," but praised the album for its "immense vocals" and "thunderous, thirst-quenching melod[ies]."

== Track listing ==
All tracks are written by Brent Smith and Eric Bass, except where noted.

No.	Title	Length
1.	"The Entrance"	0:39
2.	"Devil"	3:27
3.	"Black Soul"	3:23
4.	"Attention Attention" (Smith, Dave Bassett)	3:51
5.	"Kill Your Conscience" (Smith, Bass, Bassett)	3:52
6.	"Pyro" (Smith, Bassett)	3:51
7.	"Monsters"	4:08
8.	"Darkside"	3:53
9.	"Creatures" (Smith, Bass, Bassett, Barry Kerch)	3:56
10.	"Evolve" (Smith, Zach Myers, Scott Stevens)	2:57
11.	"Get Up"	4:06
12.	"Special" (Smith, Myers, Stevens)	3:44
13.	"The Human Radio"	4:09
14.	"Brilliant"	4:34
Total length:		50:31

Japanese/Walmart bonus tracks
No.	Title	Length
15.	"Headcase"	3:20
16.	"ANWTD" ("A New Way to Die")	3:24
Total length:		57:15

Notes

- The Walmart bonus tracks are a digital download release; they are not present on the physical disc. However, the Japanese pressing of the album has the bonus tracks on the physical disc.
- All track titles are stylised in all caps except for "Special", which is stylized in lowercase.

== Personnel ==
Adapted from the album's liner notes.

Shinedown

- Brent Smith – lead vocals
- Zach Myers – guitar, backing vocals, piano
- Eric Bass – bass, backing vocals, acoustic guitar, production, mixing, engineering
- Barry Kerch – drums

Additional personnel

- Doug McKean – engineering
- Eric Rickert – engineering
- Mike Fasano – drum tech
- HooGie J Donais – guitar tech
- Ted Jensen – mastering

== Charts ==
=== Weekly charts ===
Chart (2018)	Peak position
Australian Albums (ARIA)	45
Austrian Albums (Ö3 Austria)	21
Belgian Albums (Ultratop Flanders)	87
Belgian Albums (Ultratop Wallonia)	190
Canadian Albums (Billboard)	8
Czech Albums (ČNS IFPI)	59
Dutch Albums (Album Top 100)	77
German Albums (Offizielle Top 100)	21
Japanese Albums Chart (Oricon)	141
New Zealand Heatseeker Albums (RMNZ)	2
Scottish Albums (Official Charts)	4
Swedish Albums (Sverigetopplistan)	31
Swiss Albums (Schweizer Hitparade)	10
UK Albums (Official Charts)	8
US Billboard 200	5
US Top Alternative Albums (Billboard)	1
US Top Hard Rock Albums (Billboard)	1
US Top Rock Albums (Billboard)	1

=== Year-end charts ===
Chart (2018)	Position
US Top Rock Albums (Billboard)	58

=== Singles ===
Year	Single	Peak positions				
Year	Single	US Bubbling Under Hot 100	US Main. Rock	US Alt. Airplay	US Rock & Alternative	US Adult Pop Airplay
2018	"Devil"	21	1	-	9	-
2018	"Get Up"	-	1	23	12	30
2019	"Monsters"	-	1	-	10	-
2019	"Attention Attention"	-	1	-	30	-

== Certifications ==
Region	Certification	Certified units/sales
Canada (Music Canada)	Gold	40,000^{‡}
United States (RIAA)	Gold	500,000^{‡}
^{‡} Sales+streaming figures based on certification alone.
