= Get Up (Shinedown song) =

Single by Shinedown

from the album Attention Attention
- Released: August 8, 2018
- Recorded: 2016–2017
- Length: 4:06
- Label: Atlantic
- Songwriters: Brent Smith; Eric Bass
- Producer: Eric Bass

Shinedown singles chronology
"Devil" (2018)	"Get Up" (2018)	"Monsters" (2019)

Music video
- "Get Up" on YouTube

"Get Up" is a song by American rock band Shinedown. It was the second song off of their sixth studio album Attention Attention. The song's accompanying music video was released on August 8, 2018. In November 2018, the song gave Shinedown their eleventh song to reach the top ten on the Billboard Rock Airplay chart and broke the Foo Fighters previous record with ten songs. The following month, "Get Up" reached number one on the US Billboard Mainstream Rock Songs chart in December 2018 where it remained for two consecutive weeks. The song's number one peak gave Shinedown their 13th Mainstream Rock number one, and tied them for second place with Van Halen for the most number ones on the chart. It was also the band's first single to chart on the Adult Top 40 chart since 2010's "If You Only Knew".

== Release ==
The following year, a music video showing live footage of the band performing "Get Up" was uploaded in February 2019. The footage included in the live version was recorded during Shinedown's 2018 Attention Attention tour. A piano rendition of "Get Up" came out on May 3, 2019, with an accompanying music video later that month on May 15. On May 31, 2019, the “Get Up” EP was released, which features the regular and piano versions, as well as a new acoustic version of the song.

== Themes ==
Singer Brent Smith wrote the song while helping his friend and bandmate Eric Bass cope with depression. The song also reflects Smith's own struggles. Smith explains the premise and purpose of the song: "We don't want people to feel ashamed about what they're going through. ...You're not going to be defined by your failures," Smith said. "You're going to be defined by the fact that you didn't give up.".

== Charts ==
In November 2018, "Get Up" became the eleventh song by Shinedown to reach the top ten of the Billboard Rock Airplay chart. Upon reaching the top ten, the band broke the Foo Fighters record for the most Rock Airplay songs to peak at the top ten. The following month, "Get Up" peaked at number one on the Billboard Mainstream Rock Songs. The song was the 13th number one for Shinedown, and moved the band to a second place tie for most number ones on the Mainstream Rock chart with Van Halen.

=== Weekly charts ===
Chart (2018–19)	Peak position
Canada Rock (Billboard)	40
US Adult Pop Airplay (Billboard)	30
US Hot Rock & Alternative Songs (Billboard)	12
US Rock & Alternative Airplay (Billboard)	8

=== Year-end charts ===
Chart (2018)	Position
US Hot Rock Songs (Billboard)	85
Chart (2019)	Position
US Hot Rock Songs (Billboard)	59
US Rock Airplay (Billboard)	39
