= Save Me (Shinedown song) =

Single by Shinedown

from the album Us and Them
- Released: August 23, 2005
- Length: 3:33
- Label: Atlantic
- Songwriters: Brent Smith; Tony Battaglia
- Producer: Tony Battaglia

Shinedown singles chronology
"Burning Bright" (2004)	"Save Me" (2005)	"I Dare You" (2006)

Music video
- "Save Me" on YouTube

"Save Me" is a song by American rock band Shinedown. The song was released as the first single in promotion of the band's second studio album, Us and Them. "Save Me" was the theme song for WWE's No Mercy 2005 pay-per-view event, and is their second most commercially successful single to date, reaching number one on the U.S. mainstream rock chart (and remaining there for 12 weeks). It is also Shinedown's third-highest charting song on the Billboard Hot 100 (behind "Second Chance" (number 7) and "If You Only Knew" (number 42), peaking at number 72.

The foundations of the song date back to the mid-1990s, when the band's singer Brent Smith was just 16 years old and beginning to make demo tracks.

At the time the single was released to radio, the band was still working to complete the album which had not yet been mixed or mastered. According to Smith, "when the first single, 'Save Me', hit the radio, I still hadn't written lyrics for four of the songs nor had sung four others on the album. I was in the studio working my ass off to get finished".

== Background ==
In 2011, singer Brent Smith said, “‘Save Me’ is a song about how people will take on everyone else’s problems and issues. When they put that much pressure on themselves, they’re going to hit a wall eventually. A person in my life saw me go through the darkest times in life. They picked me up. Eventually they had that dark time and I had to pick them up.”

== Track listing ==
No.	Title	Length
1.	"Save Me"	3:34

== Charts ==
=== Weekly charts ===
Weekly chart performance for "Save Me"
Chart (2005–2006)	Peak position
Canada Radio (Nielsen BDS)	67
US Billboard Hot 100	72
US Alternative Airplay (Billboard)	2
US Mainstream Rock (Billboard)	1

=== Year-end charts ===
2005 year-end chart performance for "Save Me"
Chart (2005)	Position
US Mainstream Rock Tracks (Billboard)	30
US Modern Rock Tracks (Billboard)	57

2006 year-end chart performance for "Save Me"
Chart (2006)	Position
US Alternative Songs (Billboard)	18
US Mainstream Rock Songs (Billboard)	11

== Certifications ==
Certifications for "Save Me"
Region	Certification	Certified units/sales
United States (RIAA)	Gold	500,000^{‡}
^{‡} Sales+streaming figures based on certification alone.
