= State of My Head =

Single by Shinedown

from the album Threat to Survival
- Released: October 9, 2015
- Recorded: Ocean Way (Hollywood); Capitol (Hollywood)
- Genre: Alternative rock; electropop
- Length: 3:25
- Label: Atlantic
- Songwriters: Brent Smith; Carlo Colasacco; Jayson DeZuzio; Peter Nappi; Ethan Thompson

Shinedown singles chronology
"Cut the Cord" (2015)	"State of My Head" (2015)	"Asking for It" (2016)

Music video
- "State of My Head" on YouTube

"State of My Head" is a song by American rock band Shinedown. It was released on October 9, 2015 as the second single from the band's fifth studio album, Threat to Survival. The song reached number one on the Billboard Mainstream Rock chart, their tenth single to do so.

== Style ==
James Christopher at AllMusic described the song as a departure from post-grunge, finding it to be a "slick amalgam of electropop and vintage alternative rock".

== Media ==
"State of My Head" was the theme song for the Professional Bull Riders' Built Ford Tough Series telecasts on CBS and CBS Sports Network during the PBR's 2016 season.

== Charts ==
=== Weekly charts ===
Weekly chart performance for "State of My Head"
Chart (2015–2016)	Peak position
Canada Rock (Billboard)	33
US Hot Rock & Alternative Songs (Billboard)	19
US Rock & Alternative Airplay (Billboard)	11

=== Year-end charts ===
Year-end chart performance for "State of My Head"
Chart (2016)	Position
US Hot Rock Songs (Billboard)	46
US Rock Airplay (Billboard)	32

== Certifications ==
Certifications for "State of My Head"
Region	Certification	Certified units/sales
Canada (Music Canada)	Gold	40,000^{‡}
United States (RIAA)	Gold	500,000^{‡}
^{‡} Sales+streaming figures based on certification alone.
