= Attention Attention (song) =

Single by Shinedown

from the album Attention Attention
- Released: September 24, 2019
- Recorded: 2017–2018
- Length: 3:51
- Label: Atlantic
- Songwriters: Brent Smith; Dave Bassett
- Producer: Eric Bass

Shinedown singles chronology
"Monsters" (2019)	"Attention Attention" (2019)	"Atlas Falls" (2020)

Music video
- "Attention Attention" on YouTube

"Attention Attention" is a song by American rock band Shinedown. It was the fourth and final single off of their sixth studio album Attention Attention. It reached the top of the Billboard Mainstream Rock chart and number 30 on the Billboard Hot Rock & Alternative Songs chart in January 2020.

== Background ==
The song was released on September 24, 2019, as the fourth single from the band's sixth studio album, Attention Attention. An accompanying music video was released on the same day.

== Themes and composition ==
Attention Attention is a concept album, that, from beginning to end of the album, "charts the life of an individual protagonist from excruciating lows to searing highs", with the track appearing in the first half of the album. While discussing the track Smith stated:

"Attention Attention is a warning. It's like your alter ego jumps into the room all of a sudden, and starts messing you with you and pushing you around a little bit. And then you start going into the psychological part of the song. It's the other dimension of the individual, where the other side of them is going, 'Nothing about me is ordinary/My friends all say I'm going crazy/I don't hear a word that they say/Because the voices in my head are legendary/But I'll never tell them where the bodies are buried/It keeps them coming back every day.'"

The song has rap-styled verses along with a melodic chorus.

== Personnel ==
Adapted from the album's liner notes.

Shinedown

- Brent Smith – lead vocals
- Zach Myers – lead guitar, backing vocals
- Eric Bass – bass, backing vocals
- Barry Kerch – drums

Additional personnel

- Eric Bass – production, mixing, engineering
- Doug McKean – engineering
- Eric Rickert – engineering
- Mike Fasano – drum tech
- HooGie J Donais – guitar tech
- Ted Jensen – mastering

== Charts ==
Chart (2020)	Peak position
US Mainstream Rock (Billboard)	1
US Hot Rock & Alternative Songs (Billboard)	30
