= Threat to Survival =

Studio album by Shinedown
- Released: September 18, 2015
- Recorded: 2014–2015
- Studios: Ocean Way (Hollywood); Capitol (Hollywood); NRG (Hollywood)
- Genres: Hard rock; pop rock; alternative rock
- Length: 40:14
- Label: Atlantic
- Producers: Dave Bassett; Pete Nappi; Eric Bass; Scott "The Ninja" Stevens

Shinedown chronology
Amaryllis (2012)	Threat to Survival (2015)	Attention Attention (2018)

Singles from Threat to Survival
- 1. "Cut the Cord" Released: June 29, 2015; 2. "State of My Head" Released: October 9, 2015; 3. "Asking for It" Released: April 5, 2016; 4. "How Did You Love" Released: October 4, 2016

Threat to Survival is the fifth studio album by American rock band Shinedown. It was announced on August 7, 2015 that the album would be released on September 18, 2015, via Atlantic Records. Four singles were released from the album, "Cut the Cord", "State of My Head", "Asking for It", and "How Did You Love". "Black Cadillac" was also released as a promotional song prior to the album's release as well. In February 2018, the album was certified Gold by the RIAA, indicating 500,000 copies sold in the US.

== Reception ==
Professional ratings
Review scores
Source	Rating
AllMusic	3/5 stars
Sputnikmusic	1.5/5
Ultimate Guitar	4.7/10

Reception for the album from critics has been mixed. The staff review for Sputnikmusic panned the album for "a complete lack of substance", stating that "The melodies just aren't flowing and the choruses are rarely memorable. The instrumentation is lacking to say the least, and their brand new ideas are questionable at best. There's absolutely no lyrical, emotional, or musical substance", while conceding that "Cut the Cord" still managed to be one of the band's best singles. AllMusic was less negative, conceding that "If anything, Threat to Survival proves that Shinedown still have plenty of gas left in the tank, and while the occasional foray into the shallower end of the mainstream may divide some listeners, there's enough here to keep longtime followers satiated..."

== Track listing ==
All tracks are written by Brent Smith and Dave Bassett, except where noted.

No.	Title	Length
1.	"Asking for It"	3:30
2.	"Cut the Cord" (Smith, Eric Bass)	3:45
3.	"State of My Head" (Smith, Carlo Colasacco, Jayson DeZuzio, Peter Nappi, Ethan Thompson)	3:25
4.	"Outcast"	3:25
5.	"How Did You Love" (Smith, Scott Stevens)	3:07
6.	"It All Adds Up" (Smith, Bassett, Zach Myers)	3:51
7.	"Oblivion"	3:57
8.	"Dangerous" (Smith, Stevens)	3:51
9.	"Thick as Thieves"	3:54
10.	"Black Cadillac" (Smith, Bassett, Bass)	3:27
11.	"Misfits"	4:05
Total length:		40:14

Japanese edition bonus tracks
No.	Title	Length
12.	"Never Gonna Let Go" (Smith, David Hodges)	4:06
13.	"Reject" (Smith, Jimmy Messer)	3:30

There is also an unreleased song from the Threat to Survival sessions called "Breathe".

== Personnel ==
Shinedown

- Brent Smith – lead vocals
- Zach Myers – guitar, backing vocals
- Eric Bass – bass, backing vocals, additional production, engineering, production and recording on "Cut the Cord"
- Barry Kerch – drums, percussion

Additional musicians

- Patrick Warren – Chamberlain, synths and programming on "Misfits" and "Thick as Thieves"
- Lynn Mabry and Sheree Brown – backing vocals on "Black Cadillac" and "Oblivion"
- Delaney McLernon – additional vocals on "Cut the Cord"

Technical personnel

- Steve Robertson – A&R
- Anne DeClemente and Craig Rosen – A&R administration
- Anthony Delia – marketing
- Mark Obriski – art direction & design
- Darren Doane – band photography
- Alex Kirzhner – back of booklet illustration
- Josh Skubel – packaging production
- Bill McGathy and Gwyther Bultman (In De Goot Entertainment) – management
- Ron Opaleski (William Morris Endeavor) – booking
- Jess Rosen – legal representation
- David Weise, Beth Sabbagh, Laurie Davis (David Weise & Associates) – business management
- Dave Bassett – production on "Asking For It", "Outcast", "It All Adds Up", "Oblivion", "Thick as Thieves", "Black Cadillac", and "Misfits", engineering, additional guitar, synths and programming, mixing on "It All Adds Up", "Oblivion" and "Thick as Thieves" at Chateau Relaxeau, Malibu, CA
- Dave Schiffman – engineering, mixing on "Outcast"
- Jake Gorski – assistant engineering
- Mike "Sack" Fasano – drum tech
- Alexander Arias – drum editing
- Francesco Cameli – engineering
- Rudá Carvalho – assistant engineering
- Hans Buscher – guitar tech
- Nigel Lundemo – vocal editing
- Pete Nappi – production and mixing on "State of My Head"
- Eric Rickert and Jeff Leonard Jr. – additional recording
- Scott "The Ninja" Stevens – production and mixing on "How Did You Love" and "Dangerous", additional instrumentation and engineering
- Chris Baseford – engineering, co-mixing
- Michael Eckes – assistant engineering
- Chris Lord-Alge – mixing on "Asking for It" and "Cut the Cord" at Mix LA, Tarzana, CA
- Jean-Marie Horvat – mixing on "Black Cadillac"
- Michael H. Brauer – mixing on "Misfits" at Electric Lady Studios, NYC
- Mark Bengtson and Steve Vealey – mixing assistants
- Ted Jensen – mastering at Sterling Sound, New York, NY

== Charts ==
=== Weekly charts ===
Chart (2015)	Peak position
Australian Albums (ARIA)	37
Austrian Albums (Ö3 Austria)	38
Belgian Albums (Ultratop Flanders)	140
Canadian Albums (Billboard)	8
Dutch Albums (Album Top 100)	50
German Albums (Offizielle Top 100)	40
Irish Albums (IRMA)	86
New Zealand Albums (RMNZ)	34
Scottish Albums (Official Charts)	8
Swiss Albums (Schweizer Hitparade)	13
UK Albums (Official Charts)	13
UK Album Downloads (Official Charts)	16
UK Rock & Metal Albums (Official Charts)	2
US Billboard 200	6
US Top Hard Rock Albums (Billboard)	1
US Top Rock Albums (Billboard)	2

=== Year-end charts ===
Chart (2015)	Position
US Top Rock Albums (Billboard)	33
Chart (2016)	Position
US Top Rock Albums (Billboard)	25

=== Singles ===
Year	Single	Peak positions			
Year	Single	US Bubbling Under Hot 100	US Main. Rock	US Alt. Airplay	US Rock & Alternative
2015	"Cut the Cord"	4	1	34	10
2015	"State of My Head"	-	1	25	19
2016	"Asking for It"	-	2	-	27
2016	"How Did You Love"	-	1	-	17

== Certifications ==
Region	Certification	Certified units/sales
Canada (Music Canada)	Gold	40,000^{‡}
United Kingdom (BPI)	Silver	60,000^{‡}
United States (RIAA)	Gold	500,000^{‡}
^{‡} Sales+streaming figures based on certification alone.
