= Asking for It (Shinedown song) =

Single by Shinedown

from the album Threat to Survival
- Released: April 5, 2016
- Recorded: 2015
- Genre: Hard rock
- Length: 3:30
- Label: Atlantic
- Songwriters: Brent Smith; Dave Bassett

Shinedown singles chronology
"State of My Head" (2016)	"Asking for It" (2016)	"How Did You Love" (2016)

Music video
- "Asking for It" on YouTube

"Asking for It" is a song by American rock band Shinedown. It was their third single off of their fifth album Threat to Survival. It peaked at number two on the Billboard Mainstream Rock Songs chart in 2016.

== Background ==
The song was released as the third single from the band's fifth album Threat to Survival in April 2016. The song made its live national television debut in the same month, with the band performing the song on Jimmy Kimmel Live. Frontman Brent Smith noted that the song was the very first written and conceived during the Threat to Survival writing sessions. The fact that it was chosen for the album was a rarity; the band often writes 40–60 songs over the course of an album's writing sessions, and typically discards the earlier material. The song's music video, expanded beyond the length of the song and dubbed a "short film" by the band, pokes fun of the band and the music industry in general. The band desired to try to do something different and new that would stand out on YouTube, rather than just make a performance-based video, something the band felt was unoriginal and overdone.

== Themes and composition ==
Smith outlined the meaning of the song's lyrics:

"As far as subject matter, it's pretty straight forward: be careful of the toes that you step on in life, because they may be the attached to the ass that you have to kiss later on. It just means be careful how you treat people, basically, and don't be a jerk."

Drummer Barry Kerch expanded on the concept, stating that it was influenced on the fact that the band members themselves have to watch what they say in interviews and concerts, or it has come back to haunt them, without citing any specific examples. Alternatively, the song's music video's themes are centered around actual opinions that people had voiced about band itself, complaining that they weren't "real metal," weren't "real rock", or that they had "sold out" and were better back when they were "fat and lazy drug addicts", in references to Smith's struggle with drug abuse and obesity in the late 2000s. Musically, Smith described the song as having a "punk rock style", and named Cheap Trick and Billy Joel as influences.

== Reception ==
AllMusic singled out the song and "Cut the Cord" as album highlights, describing them as "two of its hardest-hitting (and classic-sounding) cuts... both of which are as hook-laden as they are bruising". Loudwire similarly praised the song, calling it a "hook-laden track crafted with atmospherics" that "has the vintage Shinedown sound while still moving the band forward."

== Personnel ==
Band

- Brent Smith – vocals
- Zach Myers – guitar
- Eric Bass – bass
- Barry Kerch – drums

== Charts ==
=== Weekly charts ===
Weekly chart performance for "Asking for It"
Chart (2016)	Peak position
Canada Rock (Billboard)	35
US Hot Rock & Alternative Songs (Billboard)	27
US Rock & Alternative Airplay (Billboard)	13

=== Year-end charts ===
Year-end chart performance for "Asking For It"
Chart (2016)	Position
US Hot Rock Songs (Billboard)	71
US Rock Airplay (Billboard)	37
