= Us and Them (Shinedown album) =

- Cover art by James Jean

Studio album by Shinedown
- Released: October 4, 2005
- Recorded: 2005
- Genres: Hard rock; post-grunge
- Length: 48:56
- Label: Atlantic
- Producer: Tony Battaglia

Shinedown chronology
Leave a Whisper (2003)	Us and Them (2005)	The Sound of Madness (2008)

Singles from Us and Them
- 1. "Save Me" Released: August 23, 2005; 2. "I Dare You" Released: February 2006; 3. "Heroes" Released: July 25, 2006

Professional ratings
Review scores
Source	Rating
Allmusic	2.5/5 stars

Us and Them is the second studio album by American rock band Shinedown, released on October 4, 2005, by Atlantic Records. Recorded in Jacksonville, Florida and Sanford, Florida, the album had three singles, two of which, "Save Me" and "I Dare You," were used as themes for WWE pay-per-view events No Mercy 2005 and WrestleMania 22 respectively. On March 19, 2018, Us and Them was certified Platinum by the RIAA for selling one million units in the United States. Us and Them is the last album to feature guitarist Jasin Todd and bassist Brad Stewart.

== Track listing ==
All lyrics are written by Brent Smith except where noted.

No.	Title	Music	Length
1.	"The Dream"	Smith	0:59
2.	"Heroes"	Tony Battaglia; Smith; Jasin Todd	3:25
3.	"Save Me"	Battaglia; Smith; Todd	3:34
4.	"I Dare You"	Battaglia; Smith; Brad Stewart	3:54
5.	"Yer Majesty"	Battaglia; Smith; Barry Kerch; Todd; Stewart	3:01
6.	"Beyond the Sun"	Christopher Rice	4:13
7.	"Trade Yourself In"	Battaglia; Smith; Stewart	3:33
8.	"Lady So Divine"	Battaglia; Smith; Stewart; Todd	7:09
9.	"Shed Some Light"	Smith	3:41
10.	"Begin Again"	Battaglia; Smith; Todd	3:49
11.	"Atmosphere"	Battaglia; Smith; Todd; Stewart	4:16
12.	"Fake"	John Shanks; Smith	4:07
13.	"Some Day"	Battaglia; Smith	3:14
Total length:			48:56

2009 iTunes and Amazon deluxe edition bonus tracks
No.	Title	Length
14.	"Simple Man (live)" (Live from the Inside)	9:14
15.	"Stranger Inside (live)" (Live from the Inside)	4:16
16.	"Save Me" (acoustic)	3:22
17.	"I Dare You" (acoustic)	3:44
18.	"Some Day" (acoustic)	3:13
19.	"One" (Clear Channel Stripped) (U2 cover)	4:28
20.	"I Dare You" (Clear Channel Stripped)	3:41
21.	"Save Me" (Pull mix)	4:19
22.	"Persistence" (demo)	3:40
23.	"Carried Away" (demo)	3:14
24.	"Atmosphere" (demo)	3:35
25.	"Fake" (demo)	5:05
Total length:		1:40:40

== Additional songs ==
This song was featured on a separate CD that was sold bundled with the album at Best Buy for a limited time following the album's release.

No.	Title	Length
1.	"Carried Away"	3:14

This song was an exclusive download that could only be accessed with a code found exclusively in versions of the CD sold at Wal-Mart.

No.	Title	Length
1.	"Break"	3:56

These songs were exclusive to the 2LP vinyl release on Atlantic Records

No.	Title	Length
14.	"Save Me (acoustic)"
15.	"I Dare You (acoustic)"
16.	"Some Day (acoustic)"

Additionally, an unreleased duet version of "Shed Some Light" featuring Lzzy Hale of Halestorm has surfaced online but has never been officially released.

== Personnel ==
Band

- Brent Smith – lead vocals
- Jasin Todd – guitar
- Brad Stewart – bass
- Barry Kerch – drums

Additional personnel

- Paul Fleury – cello
- Juan Perez – maracas
- Olivia Battaglia – spoken word vocals on "The Dream"

Production

- Tony Battaglia – producer
- Tom Lord-Alge – mixing
- Ted Jensen – mastering

== Chart positions ==
=== Album ===
Weekly charts (2005)	Peak position
US Billboard 200	23

=== Singles ===
Year	Song	US	US Alt.	US Main.
2005	"Save Me"	72	2	1 (12)
2006	"I Dare You"	88	8	2
2006	"Heroes"	—	28	4

== Certifications ==
Region	Certification	Certified units/sales
United States (RIAA)	Platinum	1,000,000^{‡}
^{‡} Sales+streaming figures based on certification alone.
