= How Did You Love =

- Cover art for the acoustic version

Single by Shinedown

from the album Threat to Survival
- Released: October 4, 2016
- Studio: Ocean Way (Hollywood); Capitol (Hollywood); NRG (Hollywood)
- Length: 3:07
- Label: Atlantic
- Songwriters: Brent Smith; Scott Stevens
- Producers: Dave Bassett; Eric Bass; Pete Nappi; Scott Stevens

Shinedown singles chronology
| "Asking for It" (2016) | "How Did You Love" (2016) | "Devil" (2018) |

Music video
- "How Did You Love" on YouTube

"How Did You Love" is a single by American rock band Shinedown. It is their fourth and final single from their fifth studio album, Threat to Survival.

== Background ==
The song was released on October 4, 2016, as the fourth single from the band's fifth studio album, Threat to Survival. A music video was released the same day, featuring scenes from the short film The Hound of Heaven. On January 13, 2017, acoustic and piano versions of the song were released. A remix EP followed in February, featuring 5 additional versions produced by various DJs. Later that month, the song topped the Billboard Mainstream Rock chart, the band's 11th song to do so. It was also the band's 22nd top 5 on the chart, breaking a tie with Aerosmith for the most in the format. It remained atop the tally for 4 weeks.

== Themes and composition ==
Frontman Brent Smith said of the song's meaning in a Billboard article:

"How Did You Love is about understanding and respecting your own mortality. Not in a morbid, negative way, but in a way that inspires you to live each day to its fullest and without regret, especially when it comes to your relationships and your individuality. You need to be at peace and proud when you look back and ask yourself, 'how did you love?'"

== Track listing ==
Digital download and streaming (acoustic)

1. "How Did You Love" (Acoustic Version) – 3:06
2. "How Did You Love" (Piano Version) – 3:06

Digital download and streaming - Remix EP

1. "How Did You Love" (Twine Remix) – 5:14
2. "How Did You Love" (Neon Tribe Remix) – 3:52
3. "How Did You Love" (Dr. Ozi Remix) – 3:41
4. "How Did You Love" (Rob & Jack Remix) – 3:39
5. "How Did You Love" (Nikö Blank Remix) – 3:16

== Charts ==
=== Weekly charts ===
Weekly chart performance for "How Did You Love"
| Chart (2017) | Peak position |
|---|---|
| Canada Rock (Billboard) | 29 |
| US Hot Rock & Alternative Songs (Billboard) | 17 |
| US Rock & Alternative Airplay (Billboard) | 11 |

=== Year-end charts ===
Year-end chart performance for "How Did You Love"
| Chart (2017) | Position |
|---|---|
| US Hot Rock Songs (Billboard) | 58 |
| US Rock Airplay (Billboard) | 45 |

== Certifications ==
Certifications for "How Did You Love"
| Region | Certification | Certified units/sales |
|---|---|---|
| Canada (Music Canada) | Gold | 40,000^{‡} |
^{‡} Sales+streaming figures based on certification alone.
