= Atlas Falls =

2020 single by Shinedown

Single by Shinedown
- Released: May 23, 2020
- Recorded: 2011
- Genre: Rock
- Length: 3:12
- Label: Atlantic
- Songwriters: Brent Smith; David Hodges; Zac Maloy
- Producer: Rob Cavallo

Shinedown singles chronology
"Attention Attention" (2019)	"Atlas Falls" (2020)	"Planet Zero" (2022)

"Atlas Falls" is a song by American rock band Shinedown. Originally conceived and recorded for the band's 2012 album Amaryllis, the song was left off the album and unreleased until 2020, when the band released it to raise money in support of the on-going COVID-19 pandemic. It was later released as a non-album single, and topped the Billboard Mainstream Rock Songs chart for a week in August 2020, marking the band's 16th number one, the most by any musician since the chart's inception in 1981.

== Background ==
The song was initially written and recorded by the band for band's fourth studio album Amaryllis (2012). While the song did not make the cut for the album, frontman Brent Smith noted that he always expected to release it to the public at some point, noting that it "meant a great deal" to him. The band decided to release the song on March 24, 2020, as part of a plan to raise money in support of fighting the COVID-19 pandemic. The efforts were deemed a success by the band, who announced that the song, along with a t-shirt bundle, had raised over $300,000 in approximately two months. Initially only available to those who donated, on May 22, 2020, the band released the song as a formal, non-album single, and made it widely available for purchase and streaming. A music video was released as well. In August 2020, the song topped the Billboard Mainstream Rock Songs chart. The song was the band's sixteenth song to top the chart, making Shinedown the band with the most number ones on the chart in its almost 40 years of existence, having previously been tied with Three Days Grace.

== Themes and composition ==
The song was described as an "uplifting rocker" by Louder Sound and "more inspirational in tone, a coronavirus-era power ballad with some electronic fringe and a generic message of perseverance" by Stereogum. While written far prior to the rise of COVID-19, the band's decision to release it was because they felt its uplifting message was relatable and something they wished to share during the pandemic.

== Personnel ==
- Brent Smith – vocals
- Zach Myers – guitar
- Eric Bass – bass
- Barry Kerch – drums

== Charts ==
=== Weekly charts ===
Weekly chart performance for "Atlas Falls"
Chart (2020)	Peak position
Canada Digital Songs (Billboard)	39
Czech Republic Airplay (ČNS IFPI)	51
Scotland (OCC)	39
UK Singles Downloads (OCC)	40
UK Singles Sales (OCC)	40
US Digital Song Sales (Billboard)	6
US Hot Rock & Alternative Songs (Billboard)	6
US Rock & Alternative Airplay (Billboard)	11

=== Year-end charts ===
Year-end chart performance for "Atlas Falls"
Chart (2020)	Position
US Hot Rock & Alternative Songs (Billboard)	93
US Rock Airplay (Billboard)	49
