= 45 (Shinedown song) =

Single by Shinedown

from the album Leave a Whisper
- Released: July 29, 2003
- Recorded: 2002
- Genre: Hard rock; post-grunge
- Length: 4:09
- Label: Atlantic
- Songwriters: Brent Smith; Tony Battaglia
- Producer: Tony Battaglia

Shinedown singles chronology
"Fly from the Inside" (2003)	"45" (2003)	"Simple Man" (2004)

"45" is a song by American rock band Shinedown. The song was released on July 13, 2003, on the album Leave a Whisper. Following the album's release, "45" became a popular single. An acoustic cover of "45" was featured on the album's re-release on June 15, 2004.

"45" placed twelfth among U.S. Modern Rock and third among U.S. Mainstream Rock songs after its release.

== Background ==
Brent Smith (the lead singer and songwriter) has stated in an interview:

The inspiration from the song really came from – I think a lot of people kinda take a literal sense because of the lyrics – but the song is basically about the day that you wake up and you look at yourself in the mirror and you finally decide that you want to try to become comfortable in your own skin, and realize that you’re gonna have to make yourself happy before you’re going to make anyone else happy. And basically, the 45 isn’t an actual literal term for a gun, I used it as a metaphor for the world, the .45 is actually the world and what it hands you every day of your life. When you get up, it’s a gift to be alive to begin with. A lot of different people, when I’ve talked about it, they said, “Do you really honestly mean that?” And I’m like, “Well, yeah.” Because I’ve been in that situation where I didn’t know if I wanted to continue going on and I didn’t know how to necessarily make myself comfortable with who I was, trying to find a way of learning more about myself. And you come from a dark place sometimes, and that’s really the reality of the song. It’s about overcoming and about moving forward. And it’s basically about understanding that it’s not always going to be good, but you really have no one to blame for yourself if you don’t move forward. That’s where the whole, “Nobody knows what I believe,” [comes from] because we’re all individuals. So that’s really where it comes from, it’s about moving on, really.

== Music video and controversy ==
The band requested that the music video for "45" be removed from MTV broadcast because the lyrics "the barrel of a .45" and "ashes of another life" were removed from the chorus and the title card of the video referred to the song by the MTV-originated title "Staring Down..." Singer Brent Smith felt the editing blurred the song's message and MTV was hypocritical since they had played other unedited videos. Smith believed that if they did not wish to play the song as it was written, they should never have broadcast it. Though the edited version of the video was aired a few times without the artists' consent, the song was eventually pulled from the airwaves.

== Charts ==
=== Weekly charts ===
Weekly chart performance for "45"
Chart (2004)	Peak position
US Alternative Airplay (Billboard)	12
US Mainstream Rock (Billboard)	3

=== Year-end charts ===
Year-end chart performance for "45"
Chart (2004)	Position
US Mainstream Rock Tracks (Billboard)	7
US Modern Rock Tracks (Billboard)	39

== Certifications ==
Certifications for "45"
Region	Certification	Certified units/sales
United States (RIAA)	Platinum	1,000,000^{‡}
^{‡} Sales+streaming figures based on certification alone.
