= Leave a Whisper =

Studio album by Shinedown
- Released: May 27, 2003
- Recorded: 2002–2003
- Studios: Made in the Shade (Jacksonville, Florida); My House (Sanford, Florida)
- Genres: Hard rock; post-grunge; alternative metal
- Length: 47:01
- Label: Atlantic
- Producers: Bob Marlette; Tony Battaglia; Rick Beato

Shinedown chronology
| Leave a Whisper (2003) | Us and Them (2005) |

Singles from Leave a Whisper
- 1. "Fly from the Inside" Released: March 25, 2003; 2. "45" Released: July 29, 2003; 3. "Simple Man" Released: June 15, 2004; 4. "Burning Bright" Released: July 13, 2004

Leave a Whisper is the debut studio album by American rock band Shinedown. The album was released on May 27, 2003, by Atlantic Records, faring well due to the success of the singles "Fly from the Inside" and "45". Recording took place at Henson Recording Studios and The Blue Room, both in Los Angeles. Leave a Whisper paved the way for Shinedown's successful second album, Us and Them, and was re-released on June 15, 2004, to incorporate a cover version of Lynyrd Skynyrd's "Simple Man". The album's singles also fared well, with "Fly from the Inside" reaching No. 5, "45" reaching No. 3, "Simple Man" reaching No. 5, and "Burning Bright" reaching No. 2 on the US Mainstream Rock list. Music videos were made for the songs "45" and "Simple Man".

Leave a Whisper is Shinedown's second best-selling album in both the United States and Canada. On August 17, 2004, it was certified gold for 500,000 copies sold, and by October 21, 2005, the album had sold one million copies in the US, and was certified platinum by the RIAA. The album was certified gold in Canada by Music Canada on February 8, 2023.

In 2025, Lauryn Schaffner of Loudwire named the album the best post-grunge release of 2003.

== Background ==
Prior to the album's release, frontman Brent Smith had been working with his prior band, Dreve, which had signed a record deal with Atlantic Records in 2000. The record label, unhappy with Dreve as a whole, dropped the band prior to releasing an album, but retained Smith, who they felt was worth developing separately as an artist. Atlantic signed Smith to a development deal where record representatives helped him with his song-writing ability, and helped him recruit members for a new band, which would become Shinedown. Smith moved to Jacksonville, Florida and began work on the project in 2001. The first member he recruited was bassist Brad Stewart, through local Jacksonville music producer Pete Thornton. Smith and Stewart began recording demos together in a small local studio, whose owner recommended they meet with her fiancé, guitarist Jasin Todd, who Smith brought in as the third member. The original lineup was rounded out by drummer Barry Kerch, who was the seventh drummer the band had auditioned for the spot. The four worked together on creating demos, and submitted their work-in-progress material to Atlantic, who approved of the material and greenlit a full-length album. The name of the band was thought of through a conversation about a painting that Stewart had inside of his home, with Brent Smith saying about the meaning of the band's name, "it's like the Yin and the Yang: sometimes you Shine and sometimes you're Down".

== Production and recording ==
Leave a Whisper was recorded at two studios in Florida, Made in the Shade (Jacksonville, Florida) and My House (Sanford, Florida). Production and engineering took place at Henson Recording Studios in Hollywood, California, The Blue Room in Woodland Hills, and Tree Sound in Atlanta, Georgia, with mixing occurring at Soundtrack Studios in New York City and The Armoury in Vancouver, British Columbia. According to producer Rick Beato in August 2021, the tracking process was done in around one week.

During an interview in February 2023, Brent Smith described the album as having "character" due to sounding "rich" and "full". Smith said producer Bob Marlette's use of Logic Pro and analog two-inch tape, as well as Andy Wallace's mixing of the songs Marlette helped the band work on, contributed to the album's sound. In April 2003, Smith stated the following about the making of Leave a Whisper:

We approached it in as cool and calm a manner as we could, but there's no denying that a lot of the time we were like kids in a candy store. That's how excited we were. I think a lot of that energy found its way into the music, which was our intent from the very beginning. We want each song to carry the listener on a journey, and we want to make sure the ride is as interesting as possible. The best way I can describe it is to say that this band is a celebration of being alive. We all have our problems, but if you're honest with yourself, you can draw from that darkness and turn it into something great.

The album was released on May 27, 2003. While not an immediate success, through the extensive touring and successful singles, eventually went platinum in the United States, indicating sales of over one million. Four singles were released from the album: "Fly from the Inside", "45", "Burning Bright", and a cover of the Lynyrd Skynyrd song, "Simple Man". All four singles charted in the top five of the Billboard Mainstream Rock charts, peaking at fifth, third, fifth, and second, respectively.

A promotional sampler CD for Leave a Whisper, which contained the songs "No More Love" and "Fly from the Inside", was released by Atlantic Records on February 4, 2003. In October that year, acoustic versions of the songs "45", "Burning Bright", "Fly from the Inside", and "Lost in the Crowd" were made available to download on Shinedown's official website.

The band toured extensively in support of the album, playing over 400 live shows over the course of 2003 and 2004. While touring, the band's bus ended up breaking down during the first week of the tour in 2004 while the members were on their way to perform with Powerman 5000. Shinedown ended up touring for 24 months straight, doing various tours with Van Halen, Seether, and 3 Doors Down. A live DVD titled Live from the Inside that documented the live shows of the touring cycle was released in August 2005. The DVD includes live recordings of almost all the songs from Leave a Whisper, with the exception of "All I Ever Wanted".

The album was re-released twice. The final three tracks only appear on the enhanced edition, released June 15, 2004. This re-release was prompted due to the popularity of their "Simple Man" cover, which was not present on the original album's release. On July 7, 2009, Shinedown digitally released a deluxe edition of Leave a Whisper, featuring demo material and unused tracks from the recording sessions.

== Songs ==
"Fly from the Inside", the opening track and the first single to be released from the album, is about, according to Brent Smith, "[believing] you can accomplish anything. You believe you can fly, you believe you can steal the sun from the sky. It is just this song of pure determination". Smith said the second track, "Left Out", was "way more raw" during live performances, describing it as "the jump song, it was. It was the song that got everybody, like, bouncing". "Lost in the Crowd" discusses substance abuse issues and is "about losing somebody that you tried to help". He explained, "You knew they were in trouble and you knew they were really going down a very bad road, and you wanted to help them so bad and you tried to so much, and you tried to love them and care for them and support them and help them". On the earliest version of the song, the lyrics Smith sang, which consisted of the first verse, had been improvised "on the spot" while producer Rick Beato played on an acoustic guitar.

"No More Love" was written inside a Comfort Inn hotel that Smith stayed in for "eight months". Smith said the song "was one of the first things that me and Jasin (Todd) ever wrote together". The fifth track, "Better Version", was described as "difficult" according to Smith because of having to enunciate certain words in the chorus. The death of Smith's grandmother inspired him to write "Burning Bright", the album's fourth and final single. Smith said the song's meaning is "how sometimes you feel like you can't do anything right or you're not good enough, and the whole thing is about sometimes you have to just close your eyes and try to get as much energy and as much strength and as much confidence as you can and just go after whatever it is you need to go after".

The track "In Memory" was among "the last songs written and recorded" on Leave a Whisper, along with "Stranger Inside", due to Smith being "so tired of writing songs". Smith said the track "All I Ever Wanted" was "a lot of fun" to record with bassist Brad Stewart and that Rick Beato asked Smith after he finished singing the song in the studio "How are you gonna do this live?". "Stranger Inside" was recorded in a session that lasted a total of six hours. Smith specifically requested that a gong be included on "Lacerated", the tenth track, and said the song "buttoned up the record".

Smith said about "Crying Out", the penultimate track, "I think it was the second one I did" following the recording of "Fly from the Inside". "45", the album's second single, took "thirty minutes" to write. In February 2025, drummer Barry Kerch said a demo recording of him playing the drums, which was done as part of his audition for Shinedown, ended up being utilized in "45" on the album.

Smith stated in November 2022 about the band's cover of "Simple Man", "After we started touring, we played Simple Man on a radio show in Boston. They released it as an MP3 and it got downloaded 500,000 times. After that, we recorded the song in the studio in three takes". Smith said that the half a million downloads occurred over the course of a six-week period.

When discussing the material on Leave a Whisper during an interview in April 2004, guitarist Jasin Todd said, "We didn't want 12 songs that sounded the same. We wanted 12 songs that said something". According to Smith in various interviews, the songs "Lost in the Crowd" and "Crying Out" were put into consideration to be released as singles, but ultimately were not. Smith stated in May 2004 that he wanted either "Better Version" or "In Memory" to be the last single released from Leave a Whisper. In April 2003, he said the following about the band's approach to writing material:

To our way of thinking, each song should be different – as far away from a formula as you can possibly get. We pride ourselves in taking some things you might think you know, and then twisting them around. We're not trying to necessarily be different – it's just the way we are. That keeps it interesting for us, and interesting for the fans as well.

== Reception ==
Professional ratings
Review scores
| Source | Rating |
|---|---|
| AllMusic | 2/5 stars |
| KNAC | 4/5 stars |
| Melodic | 4/5 stars |

Leave a Whisper received positive to negative reviews from critics. A review by Johnny Loftus on AllMusic compared the album to that of post-grunge acts such as Creed, Puddle of Mudd, and a modern-day Alice in Chains. He gave the album two out of five stars, saying "Coupled with a plodding, two-dimensional sound varying little from song to song, let alone from the sound of its peers, Shinedown's debut offers scant hope that heavy music will right itself from the nasty stumble of its last few years".

Brian Davis of KNAC gave Leave a Whisper four out of five stars, comparing the vocals to that of Travis Meeks from Days of the New and Chris Cornell from Soundgarden, saying "Smart lyrics and a seriously impressive singer in the form of one Brent Smith put this band a step or two above the rest of the redundant headcases". According to Melodic, the album will satisfy fans of bands like Depswa and Saliva, with reviewer Johan Wippsson giving it four out of five stars and saying "this is a clear winner and a hot candidate for my toplist when the year 2003 is closing in".

== Legacy ==
Matthew Wilkening ranked the songs "Simple Man", "Fly from the Inside", and "45" at No. 9, No. 7, and No. 1, respectively, on Loudwire's "10 Best Shinedown Songs" list. The publication ranked Leave a Whisper at number three on their "Shinedown Albums Ranked" list, saying it "made a mark" and Chad Childers, when speaking about the material on the album in May 2013, said "Songs like the rock ballad 'Better Version' and the harder edged 'Left Out' and 'In Memory' also stood out in what was overall a very stellar rock record for the band". In September 2024, the band's cover of "Simple Man" was included on Loudwire's "The Best Cover Song by 50 of Rock's Biggest Bands" list, with Childers saying, "There really is no other cover that could lay claim to the title of Shinedown's best cover".

In May 2023, Tasha Brown of Distorted Sound Magazine said Leave a Whisper's rawness and charm cannot be surpassed. The album which started it all and proves second chances are hard won".

In June 2023, Brent Smith said about the album in retrospect:

It was extraordinary. I think it shows in the work that we did on the album. We were a young band, it was our debut, so the hunger was there.

Shinedown bassist Eric Bass, who joined the band in 2008, said about the album in March 2025, "Leave a Whisper is the sound of a band becoming itself".

== Track listing ==
| No. | Title | Music | Length |
|---|---|---|---|
| 1. | "Fly from the Inside" | Brent Smith; Bob Marlette | 3:55 |
| 2. | "Left Out" | Smith; Brad Stewart; Jasin Todd | 3:51 |
| 3. | "Lost in the Crowd" | Smith; Rick Beato; Todd | 3:58 |
| 4. | "No More Love" | Smith; Marlette; Todd; Tony Battaglia | 3:46 |
| 5. | "Better Version" | Smith; Marlette; Stewart | 3:45 |
| 6. | "Burning Bright" | Smith; Battaglia | 3:46 |
| 7. | "In Memory" | Smith; Beato; Stewart | 4:04 |
| 8. | "All I Ever Wanted" | Smith; Stewart; Todd | 4:12 |
| 9. | "Stranger Inside" | Smith; Beato | 4:01 |
| 10. | "Lacerated" | Smith; Battaglia; Stewart; Todd | 4:00 |
| 11. | "Crying Out" | Smith; Marlette; Todd | 3:34 |
| 12. | "45" | Smith; Battaglia | 4:09 |
| Total length: | | | 47:01 |

The Sanford Sessions: enhanced edition bonus tracks
| No. | Title | Music | Length |
|---|---|---|---|
| 13. | "Simple Man" (Lynyrd Skynyrd cover) | Gary Rossington; Ronnie Van Zant | 5:20 |
| 14. | "Burning Bright" (Sanford mix) | | 3:44 |
| 15. | "45" (acoustic) | | 4:34 |
| Total length: | | | 60:39 |

2009 deluxe edition bonus tracks
| No. | Title | Length |
|---|---|---|
| 16. | "Simple Man" (rock version) | 4:25 |
| 17. | "Leave a Whisper" (Leave a Whisper sessions) | 3:36 |
| 18. | "Start Over" (Leave a Whisper sessions) | 4:32 |
| 19. | "Soon Forgotten" (demo) | 3:33 |
| 20. | "No More Love" (demo) | 3:46 |
| 21. | "Falling Fearless" (demo) | 4:39 |
| 22. | "Left Out" (demo) | 3:36 |
| 23. | "Emptiness Man" (demo) | 2:51 |
| 24. | "Notice Me" (demo) | 4:03 |
| 25. | "Fly from the Inside" (live acoustic) | 3:59 |
| Total length: | | 99:39 |

== Personnel ==
Band

- Brent Smith – lead vocals
- Jasin Todd – guitars, lap steel, theremin, sitar
- Brad Stewart – bass
- Barry Kerch – drums, percussion

Additional personnel

- Bob Marlette – producer, engineer (tracks 1, 2, 4–6, 10, 11)
- Tony Battaglia – engineer, mixing, producer (tracks 12–15)
- Rick Beato – engineer, producer (tracks 3, 7–9)
- Andy Wallace – mixing (tracks 1, 2, 4–6, 10, 11)
- Randy Staub – mixing (tracks 3, 7–9)
- Steven Marshall – additional guitar on "45"

== Charts ==
=== Weekly charts ===
Weekly chart performance for Leave a Whisper
| Chart (2003–2004) | Peak position |
|---|---|
| US Billboard 200 | 53 |
| US Heatseekers Albums (Billboard) | 1 |

=== Year-end charts ===
Year-end chart performance for Leave a Whisper
| Chart (2004) | Position |
|---|---|
| US Billboard 200 | 168 |

== Certifications ==
Certifications for Leave a Whisper
| Region | Certification | Certified units/sales |
|---|---|---|
| Canada (Music Canada) | Gold | 50,000^{‡} |
| United States (RIAA) | Platinum | 1,000,000^{^} |
^{^} Shipments figures based on certification alone.^{‡} Sales+streaming figures based on certification alone.

== Appearances ==
- "Fly from the Inside" was featured on both the soundtrack to the movie Grind in 2003 and the video game MX vs. ATV Unleashed in 2005.
- "45" was released as downloadable content for the video game Rocksmith 2014 in 2014; the acoustic version of "Simple Man" was later released as downloadable content for the game in 2016.
