= Fly from the Inside =

2003 single by Shinedown

Single by Shinedown

from the album Leave a Whisper
- Released: March 25, 2003
- Recorded: 2002
- Genre: Post-grunge; hard rock; nu metal
- Length: 3:55
- Label: Atlantic
- Songwriter(s): Brent Smith; Bob Marlette
- Producer(s): Bob Marlette

Shinedown singles chronology
"Fly from the Inside" (2003)	"45" (2003)

"Fly from the Inside" is the debut single of the American rock band, Shinedown, off of the album Leave a Whisper. The song performed fairly well on the charts, reaching number five on the Mainstream Rock Tracks chart, the band's first hit single, and is still a very popular song that remains in the setlist at concerts.

== Background ==
During a May 2004 interview with KNAC.com, Brent Smith explained the song's meaning:

It’s about having an unattainable dream that maybe the people around you are telling you that you can’t accomplish and you’re never going to succeed at it, and maybe they’re being that way towards you because they didn’t go after THEIR dreams. And “Fly from the Inside” is just a metaphor about believing in yourself and going after anything that seems unattainable. You have to at least try for it...because you’ll be kicking yourself in the ass if you don’t!

"Fly from the Inside" had no official video, but on the re-release of Leave a Whisper they had a bonus video with bonus footage.

"Fly from the Inside" was used in a scene in the 2003 film Grind. It also appeared on the soundtrack for the video games, MX vs. ATV Unleashed and MVP Baseball 2003.

== Track listing ==
EP (2004)
No.	Title	Length
1.	"Fly from the Inside" (Sony Connect version)	3:56
2.	"45" (Sony Connect version)	4:17
3.	"Simple Man" (Sony Connect version)	5:17

Promo single (2003)
No.	Title	Length
1.	"Fly from the Inside"	3:55

== Chart performance ==
Chart title	Year	Peak position
Billboard Mainstream Rock Tracks	2003	5
Billboard Modern Rock Tracks	2003	34
