= Devour (song) =

Single by Shinedown

from the album The Sound of Madness
- Released: May 5, 2008
- Length: 3:49
- Label: Atlantic
- Songwriters: Brent Smith; Dave Bassett
- Producer: Rob Cavallo

Shinedown singles chronology
"Heroes" (2006)	"Devour" (2008)	"Second Chance" (2008)

Music video
- "Devour" on YouTube

"Devour" is a song by American rock band Shinedown. The song was released as the first single in promotion of the band's third studio album, The Sound of Madness. The track landed online and at multi-format rock radio outlets nationwide on May 5.

Vocalist Brent Smith said that the single was "a letter to the President," and that it is about Smith's distaste towards George W. Bush. It was their second No. 1 song on the Hot Mainstream Rock Tracks chart.

== Background ==
"Devour" is an anti-Iraq War song that criticizes the presidency of George W. Bush. Smith wrote the song after the band took a trip to Iraq.

"I looked at a lot of people that were there, men and women from all different kinds of walks of life, all different races, all nationalities, and there was like a lot of them that were really desensitized, they were tired. So I wrote this song called 'Devour' about the end of George W. Bush's presidency. And what I thought of what he's done over the time that he was president. I hope that he will hear the song and that he'll want to sit down and talk with me about it, I'd like to ask him a couple questions."

— Brent Smith

Fifteen years after the release of the song, Smith said: "While I was in Fallujah, which is the deadliest city in Iraq, and played for the military, I talked to the soldiers and they talked to me about what was going on and why they were still there; some of them knew why they were, but a lot of them didn’t, and they would talk to me openly about it. But when I came back to the US, I looked at everything that had gone on, and I remembered a lot of the soldiers and found out that some of them didn’t make it home."

== Video ==
The music video to "Devour" is set in a music studio for most of the video, where the band is performing the song, with various stunts being shown throughout the video. At points during the video, the rail track in which the camera rolls on in order to get some of the shots going around the band and the dancers are visible.

At the beginning of the video, it shows the band setting up their instruments with periodic shots of a flag with Shinedown's previous "S" logo that was on their Leave a Whisper album before cutting to the performance in the warehouse. These shots also join the other elements of the video during the bridge.

In addition to various camera effects (such as slow motion and certain filter effects that changes the appearance of the film), the video also periodically cuts to Brent Smith also singing the song without a band behind him in a different setting: In an ocean-blue background with several beads of water splashing around him. These shots begin to be shown once the first chorus of the song begins.

When the song ends, the band is shown from behind the drummer in slow motion, in which Barry Kerch is seen throwing his sticks into the air (they fall onto the snares), with the other band members walking away from the camera's position.

== Licenses ==
- "Devour" served as the theme song to World Wrestling Entertainment's pay-per-view event, Night of Champions, on June 29, 2008.
- The single was also featured on ESPN throughout the 2008 major league baseball season.
- Included on the soundtrack to EA Sports Madden NFL 09 video game.
- The song was released on July 22, 2008 for the video game Rock Band. The song also appears as a downloadable track for Guitar Hero 5 part of the Shinedown Track Pack along with "Second Chance" and "Sound of Madness".
- The song is the theme song for Real World/Road Rules Challenge: The Island.
- The song was previously in Sound Choice's karaoke catalog (the first karaoke track of the song that was released), though it has recently been removed. No reason is given towards the removal (even though the site claims that the track had been removed from their catalog), giving the notion that its only a temporary removal and not a license issue. The Sound Choice CD in which the song appears (which also features Buckcherry's "Crazy Bitch") is still available, however.
- The song appears briefly at the beginning of The Final Destination before the accident at the speedway. The lyrics of the song make a snide reference to events of the film ("it's your final hour", "smash it and crash it", "until you take us all", "what a way to go"), relating to the car crash, and Death hunting after the survivors.

== Charts ==
=== Weekly charts ===
Weekly chart performance for "Devour"
Chart (2008)	Peak position
US Bubbling Under Hot 100 (Billboard)	14
US Alternative Airplay (Billboard)	13
US Mainstream Rock (Billboard)	1

=== Year-end charts ===
Year-end chart performance for "Devour"
Chart (2008)	Position
US Alternative Airplay (Billboard)	39
US Mainstream Rock (Billboard)	9

== Certifications ==
Certifications for "Devour"
Region	Certification	Certified units/sales
United States (RIAA)	Gold	500,000^{‡}
^{‡} Sales+streaming figures based on certification alone.
