= Heroes (Shinedown song) =

Single by Shinedown

from the album Us and Them
- Released: July 25, 2006
- Length: 3:24
- Label: Atlantic
- Songwriters: Brent Smith; Jasin Todd; Tony Battaglia
- Producer: Tony Battaglia

Shinedown singles chronology
"I Dare You" (2006)	"Heroes" (2006)	"Devour" (2008)

"Heroes" is the third single from American rock band Shinedown's second album, Us and Them. It reached number 4 on the U.S. Mainstream Rock chart and number 28 on the U.S. Modern Rock chart.

== Charts ==
=== Weekly charts ===
Weekly chart performance for "Heroes"
Chart (2006)	Peak position
US Mainstream Rock (Billboard)	4
US Alternative Airplay (Billboard)	28

=== Year-end charts ===
2006 year-end chart performance for "Heroes"
Chart (2006)	Position
US Mainstream Rock Songs (Billboard)	23

2007 year-end chart performance for "Heroes"
Chart (2007)	Position
US Mainstream Rock Songs (Billboard)	39
