= Devil (Shinedown song) =

Single by Shinedown

from the album Attention Attention
- Released: March 7, 2018
- Recorded: 2017–2018
- Genre: Hard rock
- Length: 3:27
- Label: Atlantic
- Songwriters: Brent Smith; Eric Bass
- Producer: Eric Bass

Shinedown singles chronology
"How Did You Love" (2016)	"Devil" (2018)	"Get Up" (2018)

Music video
- "Devil" on YouTube

"Devil" is a song by American rock band Shinedown. It was their first single off of their sixth studio album Attention Attention. It reached number one on the US Billboard Mainstream Rock Songs chart in May 2018.

== Background ==
The song was first released on March 7, 2018, as the first single from the band's sixth studio album, Attention Attention. An accompanying music video was released on the same day, also featuring intro track "The Entrance". The video was directed by Bill Yukich, the lead editor for Beyonce's Lemonade film. The song was included in the soundtrack for WWE 2K19, having been selected by Baron Corbin. The song was also included in the Apex Legends season 3 cinematic trailer.

== Themes and composition ==
Lyrically, the song has been described by Alternative Press as "a deep dive into the heart of fear". Attention Attention is a concept album that details a person's progression, from being in a dark, negative space, to working through their issues and eventually progressing into be a new, more positive person; "Devil" is the second track from the album, and the first fully formed song after the intro track, placing it in the more negativity-themed side of the album. Frontman Brent Smith outlined the meaning of the song:

'Devil' is about being afraid, 'Devil' is about being terrified of not only yourself, in some respects, but the world around you, and understanding that there are so many things and so many different situations and people and places and atmospheres and exposure that human beings are put in front of on a daily basis, [and] the world can be a really difficult place to navigate. So that's where the story starts.

Musically, Loudwire described the song as having a dense, wall of sound quality to it, describing it as having a "sliding guitar lick and off kilter beat"...backing choirs.. layers of synth, piano and guitar textures."

== Personnel ==
Band

- Brent Smith – vocals
- Zach Myers – guitar
- Eric Bass – bass
- Barry Kerch – drums

== Charts ==
=== Weekly charts ===
Weekly chart performance for "Devil"
Chart (2018–19)	Peak position
Canada Rock (Billboard)	7
US Bubbling Under Hot 100 (Billboard)	21
US Digital Song Sales (Billboard)	11
US Hot Rock & Alternative Songs (Billboard)	9
US Rock & Alternative Airplay (Billboard)	13

=== Year-end charts ===
Year-end chart performance for "Devil"
Chart (2018)	Position
US Hot Rock Songs (Billboard)	24
US Rock Airplay (Billboard)	32

== Certifications ==
Certifications for "Devil"
Region	Certification	Certified units/sales
Canada (Music Canada)	Platinum	80,000^{‡}
United States (RIAA)	Gold	500,000^{‡}
^{‡} Sales+streaming figures based on certification alone.
