= Cut the Cord =

Single by Shinedown

from the album Threat to Survival
- Released: June 29, 2015
- Recorded: Ocean Way; Capitol
- Genre: Hard rock
- Length: 3:45
- Label: Atlantic
- Songwriters: Brent Smith; Eric Bass

Shinedown singles chronology
"Adrenaline" (2013)	"Cut the Cord" (2015)	"State of My Head" (2015)

Music video
- "Cut the Cord" on YouTube

"Cut the Cord" is a song by American rock band Shinedown. It was released on June 29, 2015 as the lead single from the band's fifth studio album, Threat to Survival. The song reached No. 1 on the Billboard Mainstream Rock chart, their ninth single to do so. It was featured as the official theme song of WWE’s Hell in a Cell (2015).

== Release ==
The song was released on June 29, 2015 as an audio clip and single, and its accompanying music video was released the following day.

== Song meaning ==
Through a post on the band's Facebook page, vocalist Brent Smith described "Cut the Cord" as "the statement to the world that you will not give up, you will not give in, and you refuse to fail." In an interview with the American magazine Billboard, Smith said the song was "brutally honest and unapologetic." He also described it as essentially "a wake-up call reminding us all that we can control our own destiny by finding the courage and tenacity to destroy whatever it is that's holding us back."

== Track listing ==
1. "Cut the Cord"
2. "Black Cadillac"

== Charts ==
=== Weekly charts ===
Weekly chart performance for "Cut the Cord"
Chart (2015)	Peak position
Canada Rock (Billboard)	23
US Bubbling Under Hot 100 (Billboard)	4
US Hot Rock & Alternative Songs (Billboard)	10
US Rock & Alternative Airplay (Billboard)	8

=== Year-end charts ===
Year-end chart performance for "Cut the Cord"
Chart (2015)	Position
US Hot Rock Songs (Billboard)	28
US Rock Airplay (Billboard)	30

== Certifications ==
Certifications for "Cut the Cord"
Region	Certification	Certified units/sales
Canada (Music Canada)	Platinum	80,000^{‡}
New Zealand (RMNZ)	Gold	15,000^{‡}
United States (RIAA)	Platinum	1,000,000^{‡}
^{‡} Sales+streaming figures based on certification alone.
