= Burning Bright (song) =

Single by Shinedown

from the album Leave a Whisper
- Released: July 13, 2004
- Recorded: 2002–2003
- Length: 3:47
- Label: Atlantic
- Songwriters: Brent Smith; Tony Battaglia
- Producer: Bob Marlette

Shinedown singles chronology
"Simple Man" (2004)	"Burning Bright" (2004)	"Save Me" (2005)

"Burning Bright" is the fourth single from American rock band Shinedown's debut album Leave a Whisper. A new mix of the song was featured on the re-release of Leave a Whisper, titled the "Sanford" mix. It reached number two on the Billboard Mainstream Rock Tracks chart. The song was also sampled on the track "Just to be Different" from rapper Joe Budden's Halfway House album.

== Track listing ==
No.	Title	Length
1.	"Burning Bright" (Sanford mix)	3:45
2.	"Burning Bright"	3:47

== Charts ==
=== Weekly charts ===
Weekly chart performance for "Burning Bright"
Chart (2005)	Peak position
US Bubbling Under Hot 100 (Billboard)	5
US Alternative Airplay (Billboard)	22
US Mainstream Rock (Billboard)	2

=== Year-end charts ===
Year-end chart performance for "Burning Bright"
Chart (2005)	Position
US Mainstream Rock Tracks (Billboard)	7
US Modern Rock Tracks (Billboard)	56
