= Diamond Eyes (Boom-Lay Boom-Lay Boom) =

Single by Shinedown

from the album The Sound of Madness (Deluxe edition)
- Released: June 15, 2010
- Recorded: 2010
- Length: 5:36 (single version); 4:34 (radio edit)
- Label: Atlantic
- Songwriters: Brent Smith; Eric Bass; Zach Myers

Shinedown singles chronology
"The Crow & the Butterfly" (2010)	"Diamond Eyes (Boom-Lay Boom-Lay Boom)" (2010)	"Bully" (2012)

Music video
- "Diamond Eyes (Boom-Lay Boom-Lay Boom)" on YouTube

"Diamond Eyes (Boom-Lay Boom-Lay Boom)" is a digital single by Shinedown, written for the 2010 film The Expendables. The song was released on iTunes on June 15, 2010, and to online retailers on June 21, 2010. It is the nineteenth track on the deluxe version of The Sound of Madness. The song was released to U.S. radio on December 7.

In addition to The Expendables, the song was used as the secondary theme for WWE's WrestleMania XXVII event and as WWE Main Event's opening theme from October 3, 2012, to January 22, 2014. It was also used in Formula One's video review for the 2011 Brazilian Grand Prix. In gaming, it is a playable song in Rock Band Blitz and Rock Band 3.

The song also later appeared on March 28, 2012, as the thirteenth track on the Japanese release of Amaryllis.

== Writing process ==
On the Carnival of Madness Tour, Shinedown lead singer Brent Smith said this about the song:

A few months ago we got a phone call from a very interesting individual. It's not everyday that Rambo and Rocky call you at the same time. Sylvester Stallone wanted a song for his new movie, called The Expendables. He said write me something that will personify not only the South, but what rock truly is.

Despite this, the song did not make it into the theatrical cut of the film. However, the track eventually made its way into the director's cut, which premiered on various on demand services in April 2011. It plays twice in the extended edition, with the first being during the raid on Garza's compound and the second during the end credits.

== Track listing ==
No.	Title	Length
1.	"Diamond Eyes (Boom-Lay Boom-Lay Boom)"	5:36
2.	"Breaking Inside" (featuring Lzzy Hale of Halestorm)	3:47
3.	"Diamond Eyes (Boom-Lay Boom-Lay Boom)" (video – live from Washington State)	5:36

== Music video ==
Released on December 14, 2010, the music video for "Diamond Eyes" features a live performance of the song from the Carnival of Madness Tour, intercut with clips from The Expendables.

== Chart performance ==
In the U.S., the song reached No. 11 on Billboard Bubbling Under Hot 100 Singles, while topping the Mainstream Rock Tracks chart in March 2011.

== Charts ==
=== Weekly charts ===
Chart (2011)	Peak position
Canada Rock (Billboard)	26
US Bubbling Under Hot 100 (Billboard)	11
US Hot Rock & Alternative Songs (Billboard)	7

=== Year-end charts ===
Chart (2011)	Position
US Hot Rock & Alternative Songs (Billboard)	22

== Certifications ==
Region	Certification	Certified units/sales
United States (RIAA)	Gold	500,000^{‡}
^{‡} Sales+streaming figures based on certification alone.
