= I Dare You (Shinedown song) =

Single by Shinedown

from the album Us and Them
- Released: February 13, 2006
- Length: 3:53
- Label: Atlantic
- Songwriters: Brent Smith; Brad Stewart; Tony Battaglia
- Producer: Tony Battaglia

Shinedown singles chronology
"Save Me" (2005)	"I Dare You" (2006)	"Heroes" (2006)

"I Dare You" is the second single from Shinedown's second album, Us and Them. It reached number two on the US Billboard Mainstream Rock chart, and was a minor crossover hit, reaching number 88 on the Billboard Hot 100. The song was the secondary theme for World Wrestling Entertainment (WWE) WrestleMania 22 and also used in a promo for WWE Friday Night SmackDown's move to myNetworkTV on October 3, 2008, and was also sung on American Idol by Chris Daughtry.

== Charts ==
=== Weekly charts ===
Weekly chart performance for "I Dare You"
Chart (2006)	Peak position
US Billboard Hot 100	88
US Alternative Airplay (Billboard)	8
US Mainstream Rock (Billboard)	2
US Pop Airplay (Billboard)	31
US Pop 100 (Billboard)	78

=== Year-end charts ===
Year-end chart performance for "I Dare You"
Chart (2006)	Position
US Alternative Songs (Billboard)	35
US Mainstream Rock Songs (Billboard)	16

== Release history ==
Release dates and formats for "I Dare You"
Region	Date	Format	Label(s)	Ref.
United States	February 13, 2006	Active rock; alternative radio; mainstream rock	Atlantic	
United States	April 24, 2006	Contemporary hit radio	Atlantic	
