= The Crow & the Butterfly =

Single by Shinedown

from the album The Sound of Madness
- Released: April 6, 2010 (rock radio only)
- Recorded: 2008
- Length: 4:13 (album version); 5:26 (pull mix)
- Label: Atlantic
- Songwriter(s): Brent Smith; Dave Bassett
- Producer(s): Rob Cavallo

Shinedown singles chronology
"If You Only Knew" (2009)	"The Crow & the Butterfly" (2010)	"Diamond Eyes (Boom-Lay Boom-Lay Boom)" (2010)

Music video
- "The Crow & the Butterfly" on YouTube

"The Crow & the Butterfly" is the fifth single by American rock band Shinedown from their 2008 album The Sound of Madness. The song was written by Shinedown lead singer Brent Smith. The song was introduced in 2007, in an acoustic session on The Buckethead Show.

The Crow & the Butterfly – EP was released on iTunes on July 27, 2010, which included the original song, "The Crow & the Butterfly (pull mix)", the music video for the song, and a digital booklet.

== Song meaning ==
Brent Smith explained on a radio interview program, Rockline, that while the band was writing the new album, he had a dream about a mother whose daughter died a month before her son Trevor was born. He wrote the song about the mother dealing with the death of her child and trying to move on.

On a blog on the Shinedown website, Brent Smith said this about the song: "For me lyrically this was one of the most intense stories I have ever written. But I know the song means something different to everyone."

== Music video ==
Smith said this about a possible "The Crow & the Butterfly" video:

"We are in the process of reading through video treatments for the song, and I have to admit we have been so busy with the current tour we are on, and putting everything together for "The Carnival of Madness," we haven't even gotten a chance to ask all of you what you think about the song, and also what kind of video you would like to see from us."

The music video for "The Crow & the Butterfly" was directed by Hannah Lux Davis. It was shot on June 24, 2010, which happens to be the second anniversary of The Sound of Madness. A photo was published of the set, which appeared to be a large room in a mansion. On July 17, 2010, the music video premiered on Yahoo Music. The video begins with the band playing on a stage while a group of mysterious people wearing their black clothes eating dinner and putting their silverware down. Then, a woman with a black mascara teardrop on her eyes comes in and sees the people finishing their dinner. During the dance scene and the chorus, the girl decided to go through the people while searching for a boy. During the bridge, she was too late to find him and she found the man who walked closer to her while transforming as the band. He gives the girl the locket and whispered in her ears. The video ends with the boy and the band walking away into the light while the girl stares at the camera.

The music video debuted on Fuse Top 20 Countdown at number 18 on July 23, 2010, and on VH1's Top 20 Video Countdown at number 20 on July 31, 2010.

== Chart performance ==
"The Crow & the Butterfly" peaked on the Billboard Rock Songs chart at number one. It was Shinedown's first single to rank at number one on the Rock Songs chart. It also reached number one on the Hot Mainstream Rock Tracks chart, thus making The Sound of Madness the second album ever to have four singles topping the chart, after The Black Crowes' The Southern Harmony and Musical Companion in 1992. The song also made appearances on the U.S. Billboard Hot 100, debuting at number 97, and U.S. Alternative Songs, peaking at number six.

== Charts ==
=== Weekly charts ===
Chart (2010)	Peak position
Canada (Canadian Hot 100)	51
Canada Rock (Billboard)	2
US Billboard Hot 100	97
US Hot Rock & Alternative Songs (Billboard)	1

=== Year-end charts ===
Chart (2010)	Position
US Hot Rock Songs (Billboard)	14

== Certifications ==
Region	Certification	Certified units/sales
United States (RIAA)	Gold	500,000^{‡}
^{‡} Sales+streaming figures based on certification alone.
