= If You Only Knew (song) =

Single by Shinedown

from the album The Sound of Madness
- Released: August 31, 2009
- Recorded: 2007
- Length: 3:46
- Label: Atlantic
- Songwriters: Brent Smith; Dave Bassett
- Producer: Rob Cavallo

Shinedown singles chronology
"Sound of Madness" (2009)	"If You Only Knew" (2009)	"The Crow & the Butterfly" (2010)

Music video
- "If You Only Knew" on YouTube

"If You Only Knew" is the fourth single by American rock band Shinedown from their 2008 album, The Sound of Madness. The music video premiered on October 6, 2009.

The song was written about Brent Smith's then-fiancée when she was pregnant with their child. Smith has described the song as "their first ballad".

The song was used in a promo for ABC's daytime drama One Life to Live.

"If You Only Knew" was certified platinum by the RIAA for selling over 1,000,000 copies.

== Background ==
After Shinedown recorded their second studio album Us and Them, Smith decided to take time off before starting on the next studio album. In an interview with The Oklahoman, Smith said he would "never do a love song, ever" but changed his mind after falling in love with an old friend he reunited with. Smith explained "If You Only Knew" was "about the person that you love and that you miss and that you still believe in, and that's the only thing that you have to hold onto sometimes."

== Charts ==
On the week ending November 14, 2009, "If You Only Knew" debuted on the Billboard Hot 100 at number 92. Five weeks later, it peaked at number 42. On the week ending February 6, 2010, it matched its peak. "If You Only Knew" peaked at number 64 on the Canadian Hot 100.

=== Weekly charts ===
Chart (2009–10)	Peak position
Canada Hot 100 (Billboard)	64
Canada CHR/Top 40 (Billboard)	49
Canada Hot AC (Billboard)	27
Canada Rock (Billboard)	6
US Billboard Hot 100	42
US Adult Pop Airplay (Billboard)	11
US Pop Airplay (Billboard)	21
US Hot Rock & Alternative Songs (Billboard)	4

=== Year-end charts ===
Chart (2010)	Position
US Adult Top 40 (Billboard)	33
US Hot Rock Songs (Billboard)	13

== Music video ==
This video takes place on the steel skeleton of a skyscraper in New York City that has yet to be completed. While the video's primary focus is the band playing, there are also shots of couples standing around the building's rafters.

== Certifications ==
Region	Certification	Certified units/sales
Canada (Music Canada)	Gold	40,000^{‡}
United States (RIAA)	Platinum	1,000,000^{‡}
^{‡} Sales+streaming figures based on certification alone.
