= The Sound of Madness =

2008 studio album by Shinedown

Studio album by Shinedown
- Released: June 24, 2008
- Recorded: 2007–08
- Genres: Hard rock; alternative rock; post-grunge; alternative metal
- Length: 41:48
- Label: Atlantic
- Producer: Rob Cavallo

Shinedown chronology
| Us and Them (2005) | The Sound of Madness (2008) | Amaryllis (2012) |

Singles from The Sound of Madness
- 1. "Devour" Released: May 5, 2008; 2. "Second Chance" Released: September 9, 2008; 3. "Sound of Madness" Released: February 23, 2009; 4. "If You Only Knew" Released: August 31, 2009; 5. "The Crow & the Butterfly" Released: April 6, 2010; 6. "Diamond Eyes (Boom-Lay Boom-Lay Boom)" Released: June 15, 2010

The Sound of Madness is the third studio album by American rock band Shinedown, released June 24, 2008, via Atlantic Records. The album's lead single, "Devour", was released to radio on May 5, 2008. It is their first release to feature Eric Bass and Zach Myers, their only release to feature Nick Perri, and their only album as a five-piece. A deluxe version was released on November 23, 2010.

The album's lyrics explore diverse subject matter as opposed to their previous albums; "Devour" explores political and anti-war themes, "If You Only Knew" is a love ballad about singer Brent Smith's then-fiancée and son, and "What a Shame" tells the story about the death of Smith's uncle, and how he dealt with it, with the song being a eulogy to his uncle.

Shinedown's tour to support the album subsequently started with the band playing a few festival shows before the release of The Sound of Madness.

The Sound of Madness is Shinedown's most successful album, and has issued one multi-platinum single ("Second Chance"), two platinum singles ("Sound of Madness" and "If You Only Knew"), as well as all other singles going gold ("Devour", "The Crow & the Butterfly", "Diamond Eyes (Boom-Lay Boom-Lay Boom)", and "Call Me"). The album has since been certified 2× Platinum by the both RIAA and Music Canada, and Gold by the BPI.

== Writing and recording ==
Work on a third studio album began in early 2007; while the record label requested an album to be created in six months, Smith declined, stating that he was not happy with the results of working under the time restraints on the last album, and wished to take his time on the album. The label agreed to this, ultimately allowing Smith to take eighteen months to prep the album. Part of the long development time was due to internal issues within band members; during this time, Smith fired both Stewart and Todd from the band. Smith let Stewart go due to disagreements with the direction of the band, feeling that Stewart was no longer happy or committed to the band. Todd was fired due to major disagreements with Smith, and personal problems that were getting in the way of the band. Then-touring guitarist Zach Myers later recounted that both Smith and Todd were going through significant substance abuse issues at the time with drugs and alcohol, which lead to much infighting between the two. The band almost broke up during the period, but Smith firing Todd and stopping his drug use helped eliminate the internal issues, and helped the band move forward.

"It's time to just go over the top, literally go above and beyond what a human being thinks they're capable of recording. We want to do a huge hard rock record that has a lot of crossover potential but also some of the most insanely intense and heavy material that this band has ever tried—and see if we can pull it off." Brent Smith, on the 40-60 demos created while recording The Sound of Madness.

Smith spent much of 2007 writing new material, alone, for the third album. Sessions were prolific, with Smith writing over 60 songs during the period, though the fact that he now lacked a guitarist and bassist was a constant concern. Smith recruited a number of studio musicians for its recording sessions; Dave Bassett contributing most of the album's guitars, Tim Pierce, contributing some additional guitar, and Chris Chaney contributing most of the album's bass guitar. The rough demos were sent from the record label to music producer Rob Cavallo, who, upon hearing them, told Smith he wanted to produce the album.

== Release and promotion ==
The final result, The Sound of Madness was released on June 24, 2008. The first single, "Devour", was released on May 6, 2008, and was the band's second No. 1 on the active rock chart. In order to start touring in support of the album, Smith assembled a new official lineup for the band, consisting of Nick Perri of Silvertide on lead guitar, Eric Bass on bass guitar, and upgrading touring member Meyers to a permanent rhythm guitarist position. Perri toured only briefly with the band in 2008, before leaving to pursue a solo career, a move Smith was fine with, as he felt the band operated better as a quartet, leaving Myers as the primary guitarist.

Through multiple successful single releases, and extensive touring, the album ended up being the band's best-selling, staying on the Billboard 200 charts for 120 consecutive weeks, and eventually being certified double platinum in the United States, indicating two million units sold. Six singles were released from the album: "Devour", "Second Chance", "Sound of Madness", "If You Only Knew", "The Crow & the Butterfly", and "Diamond Eyes (Boom-Lay Boom-Lay Boom)", each one topping a Billboard rock music chart. Of particular note was "Second Chance", which crossed over to the top 10 of the Billboard Hot 100, peaking at number 7, and eventually being certified triple platinum, indicating three million units of the single sold.

The band, with its new lineup, once again toured extensively in support of the album release, spending over two years on live performances. Tours include a European tour with Disturbed in 2008, the "Stimulate This!" tour with Staind, Chevelle, Halestorm, and Lo-Pro, in 2009, the Download Festival, in the United Kingdom, in 2009. The band continued touring into 2010, including headlining the "Carnival of Madness" tour, which involved larger, 10,000 capacity arena venues, and a later "Anything and Everything Tour", which involved acoustic performances in smaller venues and Q&A sessions with the crowd. Somewhere in the Stratosphere, a live album/DVD, was released in May 2011, documenting performances from both tours.

== Reception ==
Professional ratings
Review scores
| Source | Rating |
|---|---|
| About.com | 3.5/5 stars |
| AllMusic | 2.5/5 stars |
| Alternative Addiction | 4/5 stars |
| IGN | 7.3/10 |
| Melodic | 4.5/5 stars |
| Sputnikmusic | 4/5 stars |

The Sound of Madness received positive reviews. Tim Grierson at About.com stated "Though hard rock remains Shinedown's forte, this new record suggests that the band members are more than willing to pursue other sonic territory in order to better express themselves." and referred to "Devour" and the title track as the album's "most explosive" songs. The album is referred to as Shinedown's best one by Alternative Addiction, who also called it one of the best albums of 2008. Ed Thompson of IGN wrote a positive review, stating that "There really is nothing new or Earth-shatteringly original included here. But likewise, there really isn't a weak track on the record." However, Stephen Thomas Erlewine of AllMusic gave a mixed review, noting that "Shinedown serve up what they always have: active modern rock embodying the sound of post-grunge in the new millennium without offering much that is memorable, either for better or for worse."

In 2024, Loudwire staff elected it as the best hard rock album of 2008.

== Track listing ==
All tracks are written by Brent Smith and Dave Bassett, except where noted.

| No. | Title | Length |
|---|---|---|
| 1. | "Devour" | 3:50 |
| 2. | "Sound of Madness" | 3:54 |
| 3. | "Second Chance" | 3:40 |
| 4. | "Cry for Help" | 3:20 |
| 5. | "The Crow & the Butterfly" | 4:13 |
| 6. | "If You Only Knew" | 3:46 |
| 7. | "Sin with a Grin" | 4:00 |
| 8. | "What a Shame" | 4:18 |
| 9. | "Cyanide Sweet Tooth Suicide" | 3:11 |
| 10. | "Breaking Inside" (Smith, Bobby Huff) | 3:51 |
| 11. | "Call Me" (Smith, Tony Battaglia) | 3:43 |
| Total length: | | 41:48 |

Deluxe version
| No. | Title | Length |
|---|---|---|
| 12. | "I Own You" | 3:37 |
| 13. | "The Energy" | 3:28 |
| 14. | "Son of Sam" (Smith, Rick Beato) | 3:38 |
| Total length: | | 52:31 |

Japanese edition bonus tracks
| No. | Title | Length |
|---|---|---|
| 12. | "Son of Sam" | 3:38 |
| 13. | "Junkies for Fame" | 3:26 |
| Total length: | | 48:52 |

2010 deluxe reissue
| No. | Title | Length |
|---|---|---|
| 12. | "The Energy" | 3:28 |
| 13. | "Son of Sam" | 3:38 |
| 14. | "I Own You" | 3:37 |
| 15. | "Junkies for Fame" | 3:26 |
| 16. | "Second Chance" (acoustic version) | 3:40 |
| 17. | "The Crow & the Butterfly (Pull Mix)" | 5:27 |
| 18. | "Her Name Is Alice" (Smith, Eric Bass) | 3:40 |
| 19. | "Diamond Eyes (Boom-Lay Boom-Lay Boom)" (Smith, Bass, Zach Myers) | 5:36 |
| 20. | "Breaking Inside" (featuring Lzzy Hale) | 3:49 |
| Total length: | | 1:17:04 |

2010 vinyl reissue
| No. | Title | Length |
|---|---|---|
| 12. | "The Energy" | 3:28 |
| 13. | "Son of Sam" | 3:38 |
| 14. | "I Own You" | 3:37 |
| 15. | "Junkies for Fame" | 3:26 |
| 16. | "Second Chance" (acoustic version) | 3:40 |
| 17. | "The Crow & the Butterfly (Pull Mix)" | 5:27 |
| Total length: | | 1:04:59 |

2010 deluxe DVD
| No. | Title | Length |
|---|---|---|
| 1. | "Devour" (lyric video) | 3:47 |
| 2. | "Devour" (music video) | 3:48 |
| 3. | "Second Chance" (music video) | 3:44 |
| 4. | "Sound of Madness" (music video) | 4:14 |
| 5. | "If You Only Knew" (music video) | 3:48 |
| 6. | "The Crow & the Butterfly" (music video) | 4:18 |
| 7. | "What a Shame" (music video) | 4:18 |
| 8. | "Save Me" (Live from Atlanta) | 3:38 |
| 9. | "Devour" (Live from Atlanta) | 5:04 |
| 10. | "Call Me" (Live from Atlanta) | 3:39 |
| 11. | "Second Chance" (Live from Atlanta) | 3:40 |
| 12. | "Sound of Madness" (Live from Atlanta) | 4:34 |
| 13. | "Interview from LA" | 18:13 |
| Total length: | | 1:06:45 |

Track notes

- ^{^[n]}The song "Junkies for Fame", rumored to be released as an album track, an iTunes exclusive, a retailer-exclusive bonus track and later falsely confirmed by the band to be a Target exclusive song debuted via the video game Rock Band on July 22. On August 18 the song was released for download on iTunes and Amazon.

Outtakes

Two songs, "Be the Same" and "Seasons" were written during the Sound of Madness sessions but didn't make the album's final track listing. Both songs were eventually recorded and released by the band One Less Reason on their 2010 independent release of the album Faces & Four Letter Words. Brent Smith even contributed vocals to the song "Seasons". Neither song appeared on the revised track listing when the album was released nationally by Arsenic Records the following year.

== Personnel ==
Shinedown

- Brent Smith – lead vocals
- Zach Myers – rhythm guitar
- Nick Perri – lead guitar
- Eric Bass – bass
- Barry Kerch – drums

Additional musicians

- Chris Chaney – bass
- Tim Pierce – rhythm guitar
- Dave Bassett – rhythm guitar
- Bobby Huff – rhythm guitar and keyboards on "Breaking Inside"
- Dale Oliver – guitar on "Breaking Inside"
- Rob Cavallo – rhythm guitar and piano on "Call Me"
- David Campbell – string arrangements and orchestration
- Jamie Muhoberac – keyboards
- Lzzy Hale – guest vocals on 2010 deluxe re-issue version of "Breaking Inside"

Production

- Rob Cavallo – producer
- Doug Mckean – engineer, mixing (track 2)
- Lars Fox – ProTools engineer
- Dorian Crozier – assistant engineer
- Steve Rea – assistant engineer
- Keith Armstrong – assistant engineer
- Nik Karpen – assistant engineer
- Chris Lord-Alge – mixing (tracks 1, 3–11)
- Ted Jensen – mastering at Sterling Sound in NYC, NY

== Charts ==
=== Weekly charts ===
Weekly chart performance for The Sound of Madness
| Chart (2008–2009) | Peak position |
|---|---|
| Austrian Albums (Ö3 Austria) | 70 |
| Canadian Albums (Billboard) | 19 |
| New Zealand Albums (RMNZ) | 24 |
| UK Albums (Official Charts) | 143 |
| UK Rock & Metal Albums (Official Charts) | 8 |
| US Billboard 200 | 8 |
| US Top Rock Albums (Billboard) | 3 |

=== Year-end charts ===
2008 year-end chart performance for The Sound of Madness
| Chart (2008) | Position |
|---|---|
| US Billboard 200 | 184 |
| US Top Hard Rock Albums (Billboard) | 22 |

2009 year-end chart performance for The Sound of Madness
| Chart (2009) | Position |
|---|---|
| US Billboard 200 | 53 |
| US Top Rock Albums (Billboard) | 18 |

2010 year-end chart performance for The Sound of Madness
| Chart (2010) | Position |
|---|---|
| US Billboard 200 | 104 |
| US Top Rock Albums (Billboard) | 27 |

2011 year-end chart performance for The Sound of Madness
| Chart (2011) | Position |
|---|---|
| US Top Rock Albums (Billboard) | 63 |

== Certifications ==
Certifications for The Sound of Madness
| Region | Certification | Certified units/sales |
|---|---|---|
| Canada (Music Canada) | 2× Platinum | 160,000^{‡} |
| United Kingdom (BPI) | Gold | 100,000^{‡} |
| United States (RIAA) | 2× Platinum | 2,000,000^{‡} |
^{‡} Sales+streaming figures based on certification alone.
