= Second Chance (Shinedown song) =

2008 single by Shinedown

Single by Shinedown

from the album The Sound of Madness
- Released: September 9, 2008
- Genre: Alternative rock; hard rock; post-grunge
- Length: 3:40
- Label: Atlantic
- Songwriters: Brent Smith; Dave Bassett
- Producer: Rob Cavallo

Shinedown singles chronology
| "Devour" (2008) | "Second Chance" (2008) | "Sound of Madness" (2009) |

Music video
- "Second Chance" on YouTube

"Second Chance" is a song by the American rock band Shinedown and the second single from their 2008 album, The Sound of Madness. It was released on September 9, 2008, and has become Shinedown's highest-charting single.

== Background ==
The song has been used in promotion for the second season of Terminator: The Sarah Connor Chronicles and the 2008 WWE Tribute to the Troops show. In May 2009, "Second Chance" was used in a promo regarding the return of character Michael Corinthos on ABC's daytime drama General Hospital. It was released as downloadable content for the video games Guitar Hero 5, Rock Band 3 and Rocksmith.

"Second Chance", along with Taylor Swift's "Love Story", was one of two number one songs played by Casey Kasem on the last weekend of his radio career. "Second Chance" was the final number one on Kasem's American Top 20, his hot adult contemporary countdown show that aired its finale on July 4/5, 2009. ("Love Story" held that distinction on its sister program, the adult contemporary American Top 10.)

Three versions of the song exist – a rock version, which is the album version, a pop version (notably played on Sirius XM Satellite Radio's Adult Top 40-formatted The Pulse satellite radio channel), which is a remix, although the harder guitars start in the second verse in the song rather than at the second half of the first verse, and an acoustic version, which is very similar to the original, with the exception of the absence of the electric guitar and vocal layering in the original.

== Song meaning and music video ==
At Pointfest 22, lead singer Brent Smith told the audience;

"It's important for you to hear this... When I grew up, everyone was okay with being in a bubble. They were cool in their circle. That's fine. But no one should discourage someone if they have a dream, if they want something more [...] This song was difficult for me to write the lyrics to because it's about my mother and my father, and about the day I said goodbye to them, because I had to go try, and I'm still trying, every day, to become a man. So, this song is about that. It's about the moment that you wake up and you decide you want to go for every single dream you ever want."

— Brent Smith, Pointfest 22

The official music video for the song was directed by Ryan Smith, and premiered on January 8, 2009, on MSN Music. It starts with a teenage girl sitting on a bench at night, and lead singer Brent Smith in the background. It shows that she has a job helping a fisherman. She also has a boyfriend. She aspires to be a ballerina, and wants to go to a dance school. She is seen dancing in her garage a few times in the music video. However, her family is somewhat dysfunctional, with her parents shown fighting all the time. She looks out for her younger brother, and often takes care of him. When she asks her mother for permission to go to the school one day, her mother immediately refuses, showing her bills, and shouting at her. The girl thinks about all the things in her life that make her happy, and decides to run away to attend the school. She leaves a note for her parents, and she looks in on her younger brother asleep, before leaving the house. She then goes to the bench where the music video began, bringing the music video to full circle. When her parents read the note, it makes them realize that they didn't make the best choices in raising her, but they have a second chance by choosing to let her go.

Lead singer Brent Smith is shown singing alone on a hill throughout the video, and the girl is shown practicing her dancing in the garage frequently. At the end of the video, the girl gets on a bus, where Smith and the other members of the band are riding on as well.

The video was shot on Anna Maria Island on the Gulf Coast of Florida. It was shot at various locations on the Island, including Periwinkle Plaza in Anna Maria, the Silver Surf resort in Bradenton Beach and the Star Fish Company in Cortez. The video stars a couple of local people; the girl is played by Alanna Massey, of nearby Parrish, Florida, and the little brother is William Bernet who lives across the street from Corky and Brenda Parker's house whose home is featured as the girl's home in the video.

== Chart performance ==
"Second Chance" is Shinedown's biggest hit to date. It reached the top spot on Billboard's Hot Mainstream Rock Tracks on December 27, 2008, then hit number one on the Hot Modern Rock Tracks on February 14, 2009 and marked the first time the band had topped multiple charts.

On June 20, 2009, "Second Chance" reached number one on the Hot Adult Top 40 Tracks chart, almost nine months after its original release. When this happened, the song became the third to top the Modern Rock, Mainstream Rock, and Adult Top 40 charts, joining the songs "One Headlight" by the Wallflowers and "Boulevard of Broken Dreams" by Green Day.

On the Billboard Hot 100, it peaked at number seven, making it not only their first (and, to date, only) top 40 single to date ("I Dare You" was their first Hot 100 single in 2006), but also their first top 10 single. It was also their debut single on the Hot Adult Contemporary Tracks chart, debuting at number 29. On Mainstream Top 40 radio, the song has done exceptionally well for a rock song, peaking within the top three there at number three. It is their first charting single on the Canadian Hot 100 as well, so far peaking at number 32.

Overall, "Second Chance" is Shinedown's third of sixteen singles to top the Hot Mainstream Rock Tracks chart to date, having spent 10 weeks at number one beginning December 27, 2008. On the Hot Modern Rock Tracks chart, it is their only number one single to date, having spent three non-consecutive weeks at number one beginning February 14, 2009. It was also their only number one single to date on the Hot Adult Top 40 Tracks chart, having spent seven consecutive weeks at number one beginning June 20, 2009, which is three weeks less than the song's stay on the Mainstream Rock chart and four weeks longer than the song's stay on the Modern Rock chart.

On March 29, 2009, "Second Chance" debuted at number 20 on the VH1 Top 20 Video Countdown, becoming their first video to ever debut on the show, and on May 16, "Second Chance" hit number one; Brent Smith and Barry Kerch, the guests on the show at the time, introduced it themselves. It was later number one for a second time on June 20.

"Second Chance" is also the band's first and only song to chart internationally, reaching number 19 on the Australian ARIA Charts, and number 32 on the New Zealand RIANZ charts. It has also charted at number 53 on the German Singles Chart. In Austria, the song has reached the top 20 at number 13.

"Second Chance" is also notable for being the final song the legendary disc jockey Casey Kasem played before signing off the air for the final time.

Shinedown was one of the final post-grunge bands to hit the top 40 of the Billboard Hot 100. Since then, the only acts to achieve such success were Nickelback and Daughtry, who both have frequent crossover success, and Breaking Benjamin, whose "I Will Not Bow" barely reached the top 40 on the strength of downloads.

In addition to chart success, "Second Chance" has been certified Platinum by the RIAA – Shinedown's first single to achieve any certification. Second Chance" has since been certified 3× Platinum by both the RIAA and Music Canada. The song was also certified gold in both Australia and New Zealand, and silver in the United Kingdom.

== Charts ==
=== Weekly charts ===
Weekly chart performance for "Second Chance"
| Chart (2008–2009) | Peak position |
|---|---|
| Australia (ARIA) | 19 |
| Austria (Ö3 Austria Top 40) | 13 |
| Canada Hot 100 (Billboard) | 29 |
| Canada CHR/Top 40 (Billboard) | 16 |
| Canada Hot AC (Billboard) | 14 |
| Canada Rock (Billboard) | 2 |
| Germany (GfK) | 53 |
| Netherlands (Dutch Top 40) | 31 |
| New Zealand (Recorded Music NZ) | 32 |
| Scottish Singles Sales (Official Charts) | 47 |
| UK Singles (Official Charts) | 74 |
| UK Rock & Metal (Official Charts) | 2 |
| US Billboard Hot 100 | 7 |
| US Adult Contemporary (Billboard) | 16 |
| US Adult Pop Airplay (Billboard) | 1 |
| US Hot Rock & Alternative Songs (Billboard) | 8 |
| US Pop Airplay (Billboard) | 3 |
| US Pop 100 (Billboard) | 5 |

=== Year-end charts ===
Year-end chart performance for "Second Chance"
| Chart (2009) | Position |
|---|---|
| Canada (Canadian Hot 100) | 56 |
| US Billboard Hot 100 | 26 |
| US Adult Contemporary (Billboard) | 38 |
| US Adult Top 40 (Billboard) | 9 |
| US Hot Rock Songs (Billboard) | 2 |
| US Mainstream Top 40 (Billboard) | 20 |

== Certifications ==
Certifications for "Second Chance"
| Region | Certification | Certified units/sales |
|---|---|---|
| Australia (ARIA) | Gold | 35,000^{^} |
| Canada (Music Canada) | 3× Platinum | 240,000^{‡} |
| New Zealand (RMNZ) | Platinum | 30,000^{‡} |
| United Kingdom (BPI) | Silver | 200,000^{‡} |
| United States (RIAA) | 3× Platinum | 3,000,000^{‡} |
^{^} Shipments figures based on certification alone.^{‡} Sales+streaming figures based on certification alone.
