= Sound of Madness =

Single by Shinedown

from the album The Sound of Madness
- Released: February 23, 2009
- Genre: Heavy metal; hard rock
- Length: 3:54
- Label: Atlantic
- Songwriters: Brent Smith; Dave Bassett
- Producer: Rob Cavallo

Shinedown singles chronology
"Second Chance" (2008)	"Sound of Madness" (2009)	"If You Only Knew" (2009)

Music video
- "Sound of Madness" on YouTube

"Sound of Madness" is a single by American rock band Shinedown from their 2008 album The Sound of Madness and is also the album's title track, despite the exclusion of the word "the" in the song's title. The song was chosen to be the title track after some road testing on a short run of dates. It was released on February 23, 2009, in Europe. The song peaked at No. 1 on the Mainstream Rock Tracks chart, making it their third straight single to reach the top spot on the chart. This made Shinedown the only band to have their first 10 singles all reach the top five on the Mainstream Rock chart. It also reached No. 5 on the Modern Rock Tracks chart, making it the band's fourth top ten hit and third top five hit.

== Track listing ==
UK CD single
No.	Title	Length
1.	"Sound of Madness" (album version)	3:53
2.	"Call Me" (Warner Germany acoustic session)	6:15
3.	"Sound of Madness" (Warner Germany acoustic session)	4:13

== Charts ==
=== Weekly charts ===
Weekly chart performance for "Sound of Madness"
Chart (2009)	Peak position
Canada Rock (Billboard)	13
UK Physical Singles (OCC)	77
US Billboard Hot 100	85
US Hot Rock & Alternative Songs (Billboard)	2

=== Year-end charts ===
Year-end chart performance for "Sound of Madness"
Chart (2009)	Position
US Hot Rock Songs (Billboard)	8

== Certifications ==
Certifications for "Sound of Madness"
Region	Certification	Certified units/sales
Canada (Music Canada)	Platinum	80,000^{‡}
New Zealand (RMNZ)	Gold	15,000^{‡}
United Kingdom (BPI)	Silver	200,000^{‡}
United States (RIAA)	Platinum	1,000,000^{‡}
^{‡} Sales+streaming figures based on certification alone.
