= Planet Zero (song) =

2022 single by Shinedown

Single by Shinedown

from the album Planet Zero
- Released: January 26, 2022
- Recorded: 2020–2021
- Studio: Big Animal Studio (Charleston, South Carolina)
- Genre: Hard rock
- Length: 3:42
- Label: Atlantic
- Songwriters: Brent Smith; Eric Bass
- Producers: Eric Bass; Dave Bassett

Shinedown singles chronology
"Atlas Falls" (2020)	"Planet Zero" (2022)	"Daylight" (2022)

Music video
- "Planet Zero" on YouTube

"Planet Zero" is a song by American rock band Shinedown. It was released on January 26, 2022 as the lead single from their seventh studio album of the same name. It topped the Billboard Mainstream Rock Songs chart in March 2022, remaining there for eight weeks.

== Background ==
The song was released on January 26, 2022 as the first single from the band's seventh studio album, Planet Zero, which was announced on the same day. In March 2022, the song topped the Billboard Mainstream Rock Songs chart. The song was their 17th to do so, breaking their tie with Three Days Grace for the most number ones in the chart's history. A music video for the song was released the same day, directed by Charles De Meyer. The video depicts a dystopian future where cancel culture has taken over, and ends with the interlude "Welcome".

== Themes and composition ==
The song was described as "loud and bursting with energy" by Loudwire, calling its production "much more stripped down in terms of sound." Addressing a suggestion by frontman Brent Smith that the record would be controversial, they said, "this song definitely touches upon some themes that are sure to get the wheels turning." According to guitarist Zach Myers in March 2022, the guitar instrumentals in the song were recorded a dozen times and the demo guitar recording ended up being used in the song, saying "We went through every amp in that studio, recording that guitar part again. I'd play it, [Eric Bass] he'd play it; you know, everybody but the damn assistant engineer played it at one point, just trying to get this thing."

== Personnel ==
- Brent Smith – vocals
- Zach Myers – guitar
- Eric Bass – bass
- Barry Kerch – drums

== Charts ==
=== Weekly charts ===
Chart (2022)	Peak position
Canada Rock (Billboard)	38
US Mainstream Rock (Billboard)	1
US Rock & Alternative Airplay (Billboard)	5
US Hot Rock & Alternative Songs (Billboard)	28

=== Year-end charts ===
Chart (2022)	Position
US Rock & Alternative Airplay (Billboard)	19
US Hot Rock & Alternative Songs (Billboard)	86
