= I Had a Name =

Studio album by Eric Bass
- Released: February 28, 2025
- Studio: Ocean Industries (Charleston); Big Animal (Johns Island)
- Length: 47:16
- Label: ONErpm
- Producer: Eric Bass

Singles from I Had a Name
- 1. "Mind Control" Released: November 13, 2024; 2. "Azalia" Released: December 13, 2024; 3. "Goodnight, Goodnight" Released: February 27, 2025

I Had a Name is the debut studio album by American rock/alternative musician Eric Bass. The album was released on February 28, 2025, via ONErpm.

== Writing ==
Bass shared that the idea for the album came to him in a hotel room in Milan, during a tour that Shinedown was doing in support of their album Attention Attention. According to him, once the idea emerged, he sat down and wrote for two consecutive hours what later became a summary of the background story he tells in the album. Bass explained that when writing the music for the songs, he imagined the characters he created. He noted that the album does not tell the entire story in chronological order but rather presents moments and snippets from it. The album was written during the COVID-19 pandemic, which allowed him to put all the pieces together, and completing the album.

Bass mentioned that after writing the album, he realized that aside from the fact that the album explores current real-world society through a dystopian story, it is also an autobiographical album that he wrote about himself, reflecting his battle with depression. He stated that this is not the central theme of the story in the album, which he described as a "silly rock opera" and as an "epic odyssey", and that he does not want the topic of mental health to overshadow the album's narrative.

== Recording ==
Bass is the only musician featured on the album. Besides singing, he plays all the instruments and also handled the entire production of the album. In an interview Bass said that the album was fully finished, including post production, before the writing of Shinedown's album Planet Zero, but he didn't know at first if he wanted it to be publicly released.

== Release ==
On November 13, 2024, the lead single from the album, "Mind Control," was released. The song was described as a combination of hard rock, glam rock and dance-punk.

The album was released alongside a companion graphic novel.

== Track listing ==
All tracks are written by Eric Bass.

No.	Title	Length
1.	"A World Unseen"	2:37
2.	"The New Gods of War"	3:45
3.	"Azalia"	4:20
4.	"We Can't Go Home"	5:00
5.	"Goodnight Goodnight"	3:32
6.	"Mind Control"	3:32
7.	"New Graves"	3:41
8.	"All Good Children/Our Guts"	4:21
9.	"Modenhardt"	4:49
10.	"Dead Inside"	4:31
11.	"The Churches of the Dead"	5:30
12.	"Wanna Go to Hell (Meanwhile, Back on Earth)"	1:47
Total length:		47:16

== Personnel ==
Credits adapted from the album's liner notes.

- Eric Bass – vocals, instruments, scoring, programming, recording, production, mixing, artwork, design, layout
- Eric Wayne Rickert – additional engineering
- Ted Jensen – mastering
- Julianne Moore – additional voices
- Dora Bullock – additional voices
- Anna Moore – additional voices
- Brooklynn Moore – additional voices
- Will Moore – additional voices
- Noah Bullock – additional voices
- Aubrey Bullock – additional voices
- Allison Forres – additional voices
- Tom Orth – additional voices
- Rob Prior – artwork, design, layout
- Mykela Bajari – artwork, design, layout
- Naomi Griffin – artwork, design, layout
- Faedra May – artwork, design, layout
- Cameron Prior – artwork, design, layout
- Kaitlyn DiDi – artwork, design, layout
- Sanjay Parikh – all photos
