= Daylight (Shinedown song) =

2022 single by Shinedown

Single by Shinedown

from the album Planet Zero
- Released: June 1, 2022
- Recorded: 2020
- Studio: Big Animal Studio (Charleston, South Carolina)
- Genre: Pop rock
- Length: 4:00 (single version); 3:32 (radio edit); 4:52 (Amazon Original)
- Label: Atlantic
- Songwriters: Brent Smith; Dave Bassett; Eric Bass; Zach Myers
- Producers: Eric Bass; Dave Bassett

Shinedown singles chronology
"Planet Zero" (2022)	"Daylight" (2022)	"Dead Don't Die" (2023)

Music video
- "Daylight" on YouTube

"Daylight" is a song by American rock band Shinedown. It was the second single from their seventh studio album Planet Zero. It topped the Billboard Mainstream Rock Songs chart in August 2022, their eighteenth song to do so.

== Background ==
The song was released on June 1, 2022, as the second single from the band's seventh studio album, Planet Zero. In August 2022, the song topped the Billboard Mainstream Rock Songs chart. The song was their 18th to do so, breaking their tie with Three Days Grace for the most number ones in the chart's history. On September 2, 2022, the band released an "Amazon Original" remix of the song, with added guitars and drums. On October 21, 2022, the band released a music video for the song, with footage from the Planet Zero touring cycle set to the Amazon Original version. The song appeared in the debut episode of Suits LA.

== Themes and composition ==
Frontman Brent Smith commented on the meaning of the song:

"This is about the human condition. We've got to live, and we've got to live with one another. And that should be something that is celebrated and not tolerated. That's what 'Daylight' really represents. It's our humanity. It's an understanding that we're all on this planet together, and we've got to figure out ways to take care of one another. A lot of times, it may just be asking someone 'are you okay?' because you could potentially save someone's life just by asking. We can't lose our empathy and courage towards each other, or our willingness to pick someone up if you see them on their knees, because there's gonna be a moment in time when you need someone to pick you up."

Musically, Kerrang! described the song as "a unifying ballad that could conceivably have been written for Leona Lewis." In an interview with People, Smith said "we didn't want to focus on bombastic elements such as distorted guitars and such. We wanted the intent of the song to be heard."

== Charts ==
=== Weekly charts ===
Chart (2022)	Peak position
Canada Rock (Billboard)	40
US Adult Pop Airplay (Billboard)	31
US Rock & Alternative Airplay (Billboard)	4
US Hot Rock & Alternative Songs (Billboard)	31

=== Year-end charts ===
Chart (2022)	Position
US Rock & Alternative Airplay (Billboard)	20
US Hot Rock & Alternative Songs (Billboard)	94
