= DKD =

DKD may refer to:

- Daniel K Daniel (born 1986), or DKD, a Nigerian actor
- Donald K. Tarlton (born 1943), also known as Donald K. Donald, Canadian music promoter and founder of Le Groupe DKD
- "Dance, Kid, Dance", a 2025 song by Shinedown
