= A Symptom of Being Human =

2023 single by Shinedown

- Cover art for the 2024 live single release

Single by Shinedown

from the album Planet Zero
- Released: February 22, 2023
- Recorded: 2021
- Studio: Big Animal Studio (Charleston, South Carolina)
- Genre: Alternative rock
- Length: 4:08
- Label: Atlantic
- Songwriters: Brent Smith; Eric Bass
- Producer: Eric Bass

Shinedown singles chronology
"Dead Don't Die" (2023)	"A Symptom of Being Human" (2023)	"Three Six Five" / "Dance, Kid, Dance" (2025)

Music video
- "A Symptom of Being Human" on YouTube

"A Symptom of Being Human" is a song by American rock band Shinedown. It was released on February 22, 2023, as the fourth single from their seventh studio album Planet Zero (2022).

The song was a crossover hit, reaching the Mainstream Top 40, topping the Mainstream Rock Songs charts, and becoming the first song to chart in the top 10 across the Mediabase Active Rock, Alternative Rock, and Adult Contemporary charts.

== Background ==
Unlike all of Shinedown's previous singles, "A Symptom of Being Human" was initially not released to Mainstream Rock radio, and was instead started at Hot Adult Contemporary radio. On June 23, 2023, a "Pop Remix" was released, which turns the song into an upbeat song in the style of modern top-40 hits. The song would eventually enter Mainstream Rock radio, becoming the band's nineteenth to top the Billboard Mainstream Rock Songs chart in January 2024, extending their record for the most number ones in the chart's history. The song also entered the Billboard Pop Airplay chart on the week of March 2, 2024, Shinedown's fourth song on the chart, and the first one since "If You Only Knew" in 2010.

== Lyrics and composition ==
Frontman Brent Smith stated that "A Symptom of Being Human" is written about his struggles with mental illness and the social stigma surrounding it he endured throughout his life. Joseph Hudak of Rolling Stone described the song as a "mid-tempo piano ballad about self-doubt, anxiety, and anything that threatens our mental health".

== Charts ==
=== Weekly charts ===
Weekly chart performance for "A Symptom of Being Human"
Chart (2023–24)	Peak position
Canada Rock (Billboard)	22
US Adult Contemporary (Billboard)	16
US Adult Pop Airplay (Billboard)	15
US Hot Rock & Alternative Songs (Billboard)	17
US Rock & Alternative Airplay (Billboard)	2
US Mainstream Rock (Billboard)	1
US Pop Airplay (Billboard)	19
US Radio Songs (Billboard)	46

=== Year-end charts ===
Year-end chart performance for "A Symptom of Being Human"
Chart (2023)	Position
US Adult Top 40 (Billboard)	40

Chart (2024)	Position
US Adult Contemporary (Billboard)	40
US Hot Rock & Alternative Songs (Billboard)	36
US Rock & Alternative Airplay (Billboard)	8
