= What You Wanted =

What You Wanted may refer to:

- "What You Wanted" (OneRepublic song)
- "What You Wanted", a 2022 song by Shinedown from Planet Zero
