= Not Strong Enough (Apocalyptica song) =

2010 single by Apocalyptica

Single by Apocalyptica featuring Brent Smith of Shinedown or Doug Robb of Hoobastank

from the album 7th Symphony
- Released: 1 November 2010
- Genre: Cello metal; alternative metal
- Length: 3:35 (US single); 15:30 (iTunes UK EP)
- Label: Sony Music Germany; Columbia; Jive (US)
- Songwriter: Diane Warren
- Producer: Howard Benson

Apocalyptica singles chronology
"Broken Pieces" (2010)	"Not Strong Enough" (2010)

"Not Strong Enough" is a song by Finnish rock band Apocalyptica. The song is the third single from their seventh studio album 7th Symphony. The song features Brent Smith of Shinedown on lead vocals. It was first released on iTunes on 1 November 2010, but not in the US, where another version of the song, featuring Doug Robb of Hoobastank on vocals, was released on 18 January 2011. The song was re-recorded with Robb after the band failed to secure the rights to release the song in the US with Smith's vocals from Shinedown's label, Atlantic Records.

== Track listing ==
US single
No.	Title	Writer(s)	Length
1.	"Not Strong Enough 2.0" (featuring Doug Robb of Hoobastank)	Diane Warren	3:35

iTunes UK digital bundle
No.	Title	Writer(s)	Length
1.	"Not Strong Enough" (featuring Brent Smith of Shinedown)	Diane Warren	3:36
2.	"Return Game"	Eicca Toppinen	4:18
3.	"The Unforgiven" (acoustic; Live X - May 9th, 2008)	James Hetfield, Kirk Hammett, Lars Ulrich	3:55
4.	"Not Strong Enough" (video)	Diane Warren	3:41
Total length:			15:30

== Charts ==
Chart performance for "Not Strong Enough"
Chart (2010–2011)	Peak position
Finland (Suomen virallinen lista)	16
US Hot Rock & Alternative Songs (Billboard)	36

== Certifications ==
Certifications for "Not Strong Enough"
Region	Certification	Certified units/sales
United States (RIAA)	Gold	500,000^{‡}
^{‡} Sales+streaming figures based on certification alone.
