= Volumes 1 & 2 =

Volumes 1 & 2 may refer to:

- Volumes 1 & 2 (The Desert Sessions album), 1998
- Volumes, 1 & 2 (Smith & Myers EP), 2020
