= Dance, Kid, Dance =

2025 single by Shinedown

Single by Shinedown

from the album Eight
- A-side: "Three Six Five" (double A-side)
- Released: January 24, 2025
- Recorded: 2024
- Studio: Big Animal Studio (Charleston, South Carolina)
- Genre: Pop rock; hard rock
- Length: 3:32
- Label: Atlantic
- Songwriters: Brent Smith; Dave Bassett; Eric Bass
- Producer: Eric Bass

Shinedown singles chronology
"A Symptom of Being Human" (2023)	"Three Six Five" / "Dance, Kid, Dance" (2025)	"Killing Fields" (2025)

Music video
- "Dance, Kid, Dance" on YouTube

"Dance, Kid, Dance" is a single by the American rock band Shinedown, released on January 24, 2025, as the second official single from their eighth studio album, Eight.

== Background ==
On January 15, 2025, the band shared a Spotify playlist titled "D.K.D. Mixtape", featuring a diverse range of songs from various genres, accompanied by the suggestion to "let the music move you". This playlist's title was later revealed to be an acronym for "Dance, Kid, Dance". On January 17, the band officially announced that the song would be released on January 24, alongside another single, "Three Six Five". The songs were released together as a double A-side single. A music video for the song was released on April 3, 2025, directed by Lewis Cater.

The band's 2025 tour is named after the song.

== Lyrics ==
The song serves as both a social critique and a personal statement. The lyrics address the increasing societal decline, criticizing the addiction to superficial thrills and the growing isolation of individuals, while simultaneously conveying a message about overcoming personal fears and embracing life's experiences.

In an interview with "Faceculture" Eric Bass said that the song is "about how, as a society, we put kids on a lot of pharmaceutical drugs, at least in America we do, for sure — a lot of antidepressants and Ritalin and things like this. And by the way, that's one place that I was fortunate as a child. I was diagnosed with what was just termed as ADD back in the 1970s when I was diagnosed with it, but there was no 'H' in ADHD. But they wanted to put me on Ritalin, and my mother said no, which I'm really happy she didn't. At the time, me being a kid, I wasn't sure how to navigate those waters".

== Chart performance ==
Upon its release, "Dance, Kid, Dance" was well-received, entering the list of top six new songs on the Mediabase ranking. The following day, it reached the fourth position on iTunes' daily rock chart. By January 26, two days post-release, the song debuted at number 33 on Mediabase's Active Rock chart. A week after its release, it debuted at number 11 on Billboard's Rock & Alternative Airplay chart and the 14th spot on the Mainstream Rock chart. The song went on to reach the top of the Mainstream Rock chart in March, extending the band's record and marking the first time an artist had earned 20 number ones in the format.

== Charts ==
=== Weekly charts ===
Weekly chart performance for "Dance, Kid, Dance"
Chart (2025)	Peak position
Canada Mainstream Rock (Billboard)	2
Germany Airplay (TopHit)	49
Italy Rock Airplay (FIMI)	20
UK Singles Downloads (Official Charts)	44
UK Singles Sales (OCC)	45
US Digital Song Sales (Billboard)	20
US Hot Rock & Alternative Songs (Billboard)	36
US Rock & Alternative Airplay (Billboard)	5

Weekly chart performance for "Three Six Five"
Chart (2025)	Peak position
Canada Digital Songs (Billboard)	25
Canada Hot AC (Billboard)	31
Canada Mainstream Rock (Billboard)	26
Finland Airplay (Radiosoittolista)	79
German Alternative Singles (GfK)	1
Italy Rock Airplay (FIMI)	7
UK Singles Downloads (Official Charts)	44
UK Singles Sales (OCC)	45
US Adult Contemporary (Billboard)	13
US Adult Pop Airplay (Billboard)	12
US Digital Song Sales (Billboard)	10
US Pop Airplay (Billboard)	23
US Hot Rock & Alternative Songs (Billboard)	30
US Rock & Alternative Airplay (Billboard)	9

=== Year-end charts ===
Year-end chart performance for "Dance, Kid, Dance"
Chart (2025)	Position
Canada Mainstream Rock (Billboard)	7
US Rock & Alternative Airplay (Billboard)	27

Year-end chart performance for "Three Six Five"
Chart (2025)	Position
Canada Hot AC (Billboard)	69
Canada Mainstream Rock (Billboard)	56
US Adult Contemporary (Billboard)	34
US Adult Pop Airplay (Billboard)	30
US Hot Rock & Alternative Songs (Billboard)	49
US Rock & Alternative Airplay (Billboard)	42
