= End of Me (Apocalyptica song) =

Single by Apocalyptica featuring Gavin Rossdale of Bush

from the album 7th Symphony
- Released: 2 August 2010
- Recorded: 2010
- Genre: Cello metal, alternative metal
- Length: 3:30
- Songwriters: Eicca Toppinen, Gavin Rossdale, Johnny Andrews
- Producer: Joe Barresi

Apocalyptica singles chronology
"I Don't Care" (2008)	"End of Me" (2010)	"Broken Pieces" (2010)

"End of Me" is a song by Finnish rock band Apocalyptica, the song is released as the first single from their seventh studio album 7th Symphony. The song features Gavin Rossdale of Bush on lead vocals. It was first released on iTunes on 2 August 2010 and in Germany on 6 August 2010.

The music video for "End of Me" was shot in a crematorium in Altadena, California at the end of May 2010. The band worked again with Canadian Lisa Mann who directed the video for "I Don't Care" from the album Worlds Collide.

== Formats and track listings ==
- Maxi-CD
1. "End of Me" - 3:30
2. "Path" (Acoustic at XM Radio) - 2:38
- iTunes digital bundle
1. "End of Me" - 3:30
2. "Path" (Acoustic at XM Radio) - 2:38
3. "End of Me" (300mph Remix) - 3:19
4. "End of Me" (Video) – 3:37

== Charts ==
=== Weekly charts ===
Chart (2010)	Peak position
Canada Rock (Billboard)	39
Germany (GfK)	81
US Hot Rock & Alternative Songs (Billboard)	16

=== Year-end charts ===
Chart (2010)	Position
US Hot Rock Songs (Billboard)	50
