= Acoustic Sessions (Shinedown EP) =

- Cover art for part 1

EP by Smith & Myers
- Released: January 28, 2014; March 18, 2014
- Length: Part 1: 25:18; Part 2: 17:51
- Label: Atlantic

Smith & Myers chronology
Acoustic Sessions (2014)	Volumes, 1 & 2 (2020)

Alternative cover
- Cover art for part 2

Acoustic Sessions is a duo of EPs by Brent Smith and Zach Myers of American rock band Shinedown, released on iTunes on January 28 and March 18, 2014. Videos of the recording sessions, directed by Darren Doane, were released on YouTube in the weeks prior to each album's release.

== Production ==
Frontman Brent Smith and guitarist Zach Myers asked fans to request songs on their Facebook page to be narrowed down to their top ten cover choices. Smith said of the album, "This is for the fans. They picked the songs and we recorded them. It’s as simple as that. And I must say that our audience has great taste."

The ten songs voted highest by the fans were planned to be released over ten days, along with YouTube videos of the recordings, directed by Darren Doane. However, some of the artists being covered (Adele, Phil Collins, Pearl Jam, and Bon Jovi) did not sign off in time for the video release. The extended play was reduced to six songs. The following recording videos were released on YouTube between January 22 and January 28:

- "London Calling" (The Clash), January 22, 2014
- "(Sittin' On) The Dock of the Bay" (Otis Redding), January 23, 2014
- '"Black" (Pearl Jam), January 24, 2014
- "Nothing Else Matters" (Metallica), January 25, 2014
- "Blue on Black" (Kenny Wayne Shepherd), January 26, 2014
- "Runaway Train" (Soul Asylum), January 27, 2014
- "She Talks to Angels" (Black Crowes), January 28, 2014

Smith insisted on eventually releasing all of the videos on YouTube, saying, "It's not about money for us. We didn't write these songs. We did this for the audience and for the fans, and we know it's something they're gonna dig." Despite the fact that the band did not intend to sell the songs, the album (Acoustic Sessions) - EP was released for sale on iTunes under the name "Smith & Myers" on January 28, 2014.

The following videos were released on YouTube in March 2014:

- "Someone Like You" (Adele), March 11, 2014
- "In the Air Tonight" (Phil Collins), March 11, 2014
- "Wanted Dead or Alive" (Bon Jovi), March 18, 2014

On March 18, 2014, (Acoustic Sessions, Pt. 2) - EP was released on iTunes with the previously omitted tracks.

== Track listing ==
Acoustic Sessions EP
No.	Title	Original Artist	Length
1.	"London Calling"	The Clash	2:49
2.	"(Sittin' On) The Dock of the Bay"	Otis Redding	3:24
3.	"Nothing Else Matters"	Metallica	4:56
4.	"She Talks to Angels"	Black Crowes	5:04
5.	"Blue on Black"	Kenny Wayne Shepherd	5:44
6.	"Runaway Train"	Soul Asylum	3:25
Total length:			25:22

Acoustic Sessions, Pt. 2 EP
No.	Title	Original Artist	Length
1.	"Someone Like You"	Adele	4:56
2.	"Wanted Dead or Alive"	Bon Jovi	3:30
3.	"Black"	Pearl Jam	4:34
4.	"In the Air Tonight"	Phil Collins	4:51
Total length:			17:51

== Personnel ==
Band

- Brent Smith - lead vocals
- Zach Myers - guitar
- Kenny Wayne Shepherd - guitar on "Blue on Black"

Production

- Darren Doane - director (video companion)
