= Sick Like Me =

Single by In This Moment

from the album Black Widow
- B-side: "Big Bad Wolf"
- Released: September 9, 2014
- Length: 5:00
- Label: Atlantic
- Songwriter: In This Moment

In This Moment singles chronology
"Whore" (2013)	"Sick Like Me" (2014)	"Big Bad Wolf" (2014)

Music video
- "Sick Like Me" on YouTube

"Sick Like Me" is a song by American rock band In This Moment. It is the first single taken from the band's fifth album Black Widow.

== About the song ==
The song premiered on Sirius Octane on September 8, 2014 and released digitally on September 9, 2014. The song follows the same style as the band's previous effort, Blood, with hard crunching guitars and melodic soaring choruses. Singer Maria Brink exercises both her clean singing and heavy screams throughout the song pleading in the chorus, "Am I beautiful as I tear you to pieces..." Brink says of the song, "It's about when somebody loves you for everything you are," she states. "They love you even for what you consider flaws. It's that vision of people who are super eccentric and twisted, but they're perfect like that because that's who they are. They're meant to be."

A Best Buy exclusive release of the single (with "Big Bad Wolf") was released in the U.S. on November 4, 2014.

The music video was directed by Robert Kley and Maria Brink and premiered on their Facebook page October 20, 2014.

== Track list ==
All lyrics are written by Maria Brink; all music is composed by In This Moment, Kevin Churko, Mitchell Ray Marlow.

CD Single
No.	Title	Length
1.	"Sick Like Me"	5:00
2.	"Big Bad Wolf"	5:10
Total length:		10:10

== Personnel ==
- Maria Brink – lead vocals, piano
- Chris Howorth – lead guitar, backing vocals,
- Randy Weitzel – rhythm guitar
- Travis Johnson - bass guitar
- Tom Hane – drums, percussions

== Charts ==
On June 29, 2022, the single was certified Gold by the Recording Industry Association of America (RIAA), moving 500,000 copies in the United States.

Chart (2014)	Peak position
US Rock Songs (Billboard)	36
US Mainstream Rock (Billboard)	12
US Rock Digital Songs (Billboard)	13

== Certifications ==
Region	Certification	Certified units/sales
United States (RIAA)	Gold	500,000^{‡}
^{‡} Sales+streaming figures based on certification alone.

== In popular culture ==
The track is used in the first episode of the second season of Murder in the First, with Maria Brink appearing in the show singing the track during the underground chase scene.
