= Black Widow (In This Moment album) =

2014 studio album by In This Moment

Studio album by In This Moment
- Released: November 17, 2014
- Recorded: 2014
- Studio: The Hideout, Las Vegas
- Genre: Gothic metal; industrial metal; alternative metal; electronic metal
- Length: 60:05
- Label: Atlantic
- Producer: Kevin Churko

In This Moment chronology
Blood at the Orpheum (2014)	Black Widow (2014)	Rise of the Blood Legion: Greatest Hits (Chapter 1) (2015)

Singles from Black Widow
- 1. "Sick Like Me" Released: September 9, 2014; 2. "Big Bad Wolf" Released: October 21, 2014; 3. "Sex Metal Barbie" Released: November 4, 2014

Black Widow is the fifth studio album by American rock band In This Moment, released on November 17, 2014, by Atlantic Records, marking the band's major-label debut and first release away from longtime label Century Media Records. Black Widow is the second and last album to feature drummer Tom Hane, who left the band in March 2016 citing creative differences.

== Background ==
After the success of their 2012 album Blood and a headline tour, In This Moment announced that they were returning to the studio at the end February 2014 to begin working on a follow-up. Lead guitarist Chris Howorth told Billboard that they were again teaming up with longtime collaborator Kevin Churko, who has produced the band's previous records, and that the sound would continue with the same style as Blood. On their new evolved sound he remarked, "We feel like we found something and want to stick the flag in the ground on top of that hill." It was reported on February 5 that the band had signed with Atlantic Records. Frontwoman Maria Brink said of the new deal, "We are very excited to be releasing this album through Atlantic Records, who have put out some of the greatest and most revered albums of all time."

== Composition ==
The genre of the album has been described primarily as gothic metal, industrial metal, alternative metal, and electronic metal, with elements of metalcore.

== Release and promotion ==
It was revealed on September 6, 2014, through the band's social media pages that new album details would be announced the following week. A redesign of the band's logo featured an image of a black widow, in line with the new album. On September 8, the first single, "Sick Like Me", premiered on Sirius Satellite Radio and was released to iTunes at midnight. The album's title was announced along with a headlining tour, which began in late October. Brink revealed the title is a metaphor for positive and negative life experiences and turning weaknesses into strength. She says, "This innocent young girl who gets infected with life, traumas, experiences, and the balance of light and darkness. She becomes this poised and powerful creature."

The album was made available for pre-order on iTunes on October 14, 2014, while the second single, "Big Bad Wolf", was released on October 21. Leaving little time in between, "Bloody Creature Poster Girl" was released as the next promotional single on October 27, followed by the final pre-release single, "Sex Metal Barbie", on November 4.

=== Tours and performances ===
To support the release, the band performed at Knotfest on October 25, 2014, before headlining the Black Widow Tour, which kicked off on October 26, 2014, and concluded on December 14, 2014, with Starset, Twelve Foot Ninja, and 3 Pill Morning as the opening acts. The Black Widow shows presented a more elaborate stage show with each song featuring a new set, props, and choreography. According to Brink, the stage show is to bring the songs to life. Throughout 2015, the headline tour resumed in Europe and the United States, followed by supporting slots for Papa Roach, Five Finger Death Punch and Godsmack. On March 16, 2016, Drummer Tom Hane announced his departure from the band, citing creative and artistic unhappiness. The band replaced Hane with Kent Diimmel, the drummer from 3 by Design. On June 18, 2016, the band kicked off The Hellpop 2016 Tour with openers Hellyeah, Sunflower Undead, and Shaman's Harvest before joining Rob Zombie and Korn for their summer tour.

A second outing in Europe and the UK was scheduled to begin on January 10, 2016, in France. Due to health problems concerning the band members, the tour was postponed and later cancelled. Guitarist Howorth announced that he was being treated for a neck injury due to years of headbanging on stage. Howorth later revealed that the treatment led to painkiller addictions, which he overcame.

== Critical reception ==
Professional ratings
Review scores
Source	Rating
About.com	3.5/5 stars

Stephen Hill of Louder Sound gave Black Widow three-and-a-half out of five stars, saying that it "is a big step in the right direction" and goes on to describe it as "slicker and poppier" than In This Moment's previous albums. Arielle J of KillYourStereo cited Black Widow is "a good example of how a band should evolve", praising Maria Brink's vocals as "completely dynamic".

Following the album's success, In This Moment was nominated for Breakthrough Band of the Year at the 2015 Metal Hammer Golden Gods Awards, alongside Halestorm, Bury Tomorrow, and the Amity Affliction, but lost out to Babymetal.

== Commercial performance ==
Black Widow debuted at number eight on the US Billboard 200 with first-week sales of 36,000 copies, marking the band's highest chart entry. By June 2015, the album had sold 120,000 copies.

On June 29, 2022, the singles "Sick Like Me" and "Big Bad Wolf" were certified Gold by the Recording Industry Association of America (RIAA), moving 500,000 copies in the United States.

== Track listing ==
All tracks are written by Maria Brink, Chris Howorth, and Kevin Churko, except where noted. All tracks are produced by Kevin Churko.

No.	Title	Writer(s)	Length
1.	"The Infection"		1:49
2.	"Sex Metal Barbie"		4:22
3.	"Big Bad Wolf"		5:12
4.	"Dirty Pretty"		4:07
5.	"Black Widow"		4:58
6.	"Sexual Hallucination" (featuring Brent Smith)		6:18
7.	"Sick Like Me"	Brink; Howorth; Kevin Churko; Mitchell Ray Marlow	5:00
8.	"Bloody Creature Poster Girl"	Brink; Howorth; Kevin Churko; Kane Churko	4:20
9.	"The Fighter"	Brink; Howorth; Kevin Churko; Nick Helbling; Michael Spadoni	4:52
10.	"Bones"	Brink; Howorth; Kevin Churko; Kane Churko	4:30
11.	"Natural Born Sinner"		5:09
12.	"Into the Darkness"		2:52
13.	"Out of Hell"		6:34
Total length:			60:03

Best Buy and Japanese edition bonus tracks
No.	Title	Length
14.	"Turn You"	5:27
15.	"Rib Cage"	5:06
Total length:		70:36

Vinyl digital download bonus tracks
No.	Title	Length
1.	"Sick Like Me" (Motionless in White remix)
2.	"Big Bad Wolf" (Dr. Ozi remix)

== Personnel ==
Credits adapted from the liner notes of Black Widow.

- Kevin Churko – production, recording, mixing, mastering
- Kane Churko – additional engineering, programming, editing
- Shawn McGhee – additional engineering, editing
- Nick Helbling – additional programming, editing
- Marcel Szczypka – additional programming, editing
- Kelly Churko – noise
- Khloe Churko – studio management and assistance
- Michael Spadoni – piano on "The Fighter"
- Brent Smith – guest vocals on "Sexual Hallucination"
- Sean Mosher-Smith – art direction, design, photo illustration
- Robert Kley – cover image, booklet photos
- Jeremy Saffer – album cover image editing, back cover
- Tom Hane – back booklet photo

== Charts ==
=== Weekly charts ===
Weekly chart performance for Black Widow
Chart (2014)	Peak position
Australian Albums (ARIA)	89
Canadian Albums (Billboard)	16
Japanese Albums (Oricon)	110
UK Albums (OCC)	81
UK Rock & Metal Albums (OCC)	7
US Billboard 200	8
US Top Hard Rock Albums (Billboard)	3
US Top Rock Albums (Billboard)	4

=== Year-end charts ===
Year-end chart performance for Black Widow
Chart (2015)	Position
US Top Hard Rock Albums (Billboard)	8
US Top Rock Albums (Billboard)	34
