= Volumes, 1 & 2 (Smith & Myers EPs) =

- Cover art for Volume 1

EP by Smith & Myers
- Released: Volume 1: October 9, 2020; Volume 2: October 23, 2020
- Recorded: 2020
- Length: Volume 1: 34:01; Volume 2: 36:02
- Label: Atlantic
- Producer: Dave Bassett

Smith & Myers chronology
Acoustic Sessions (2014)	Volumes, 1 & 2 (2020)

Alternative cover
- Cover art for Volume 2

Volumes, 1 & 2 is a pair of EPs by Brent Smith and Zach Myers of American rock band Shinedown. Volume 1 was released on October 9, 2020, while Volume 2 was released on October 23, 2020. Both EPs were released via Atlantic. These are the first EPs by Smith and Myers to feature a mixture of acoustic covers and originals by the duo along with additional instruments such as a piano, unlike the previous EP which featured only acoustic guitars and all cover songs on the disc. The first two songs released by the duo features one original song entitled "Not Mad Enough" and one cover track originally by Neil Young called "Rockin' in the Free World". Both songs were released via YouTube and all streaming platforms on August 21, 2020.

== Production ==
Smith and Myers again let their fans vote on songs that they want to have them cover, as with the previous EP, but this time voting took place on their main page instead of having them vote via Facebook.

== Track listing ==
All tracks are written by Brent Smith and Zach Myers, except where noted

Volume 1
No.	Title	Writer(s)	Length
1.	"Not Mad Enough"		3:39
2.	"Rockin' in the Free World"	Neil Young	3:33
3.	"The Weight of It All"		3:00
4.	"Better Now"	Post Malone; Louis Bell; Frank Dukes; Billy Walsh	3:20
5.	"Panic!"		3:03
6.	"Never Tear Us Apart"	Andrew Farriss; Michael Hutchence	3:17
7.	"Coast to Coast"		3:46
8.	"Valerie"	Abi Harding; Boyan Chowdhury; Dave McCabe; Russ Pritchard; Sean Payne	3:27
9.	"Since You Were Mine"		3:14
10.	"Unchained Melody"	Alex North; Hy Zaret	3:42
Total length:			34:01

Volume 2
No.	Title	Writer(s)	Length
1.	"Bad at Love"		3:27
2.	"Bad Guy"	Billie Eilish; Finneas O'Connell	3:20
3.	"New School Shiver"		3:04
4.	"Sledgehammer"	Peter Gabriel	3:37
5.	"GBL GBD"		2:53
6.	"Rebel Yell"	Billy Idol; Steve Stevens	4:28
7.	"Like You Never Left"		3:52
8.	"Losing My Religion"	Bill Berry; Peter Buck; Mike Mills; Michael Stipe	4:23
9.	"One More Time"		3:11
10.	"Don't Look Back in Anger"	Noel Gallagher	3:47
Total length:			36:02

== Personnel ==
- Brent Smith – lead vocals, co-lead vocals on "Never Tear Us Apart"
- Zach Myers – guitar, piano, lead vocals on "Never Tear Us Apart" and "Don't Look Back in Anger"

Production

- Paris Visone – director for "Not Mad Enough" and "One More Time" videos
- Sanjay Parikh — director for "Bad Guy" & "Panic!" videos
