= Eight (Shinedown album) =

Studio album by Shinedown
- Released: May 29, 2026
- Recorded: 2024–2025
- Studio: Big Animal Studio (Charleston, South Carolina)
- Genres: Hard rock; pop rock; alternative rock; country rock; arena rock
- Length: 64:28
- Label: Atlantic
- Producer: Eric Bass

Shinedown chronology
Planet Zero (2022)	Eight (2026)

Singles from Eight
- 1. "Three Six Five" Released: January 24, 2025; 2. "Dance, Kid, Dance" Released: January 24, 2025; 3. "Killing Fields" Released: July 15, 2025; 4. "Searchlight" Released: November 18, 2025; 5. "Safe and Sound" Released: February 17, 2026; 6. "Young Again" Released: May 29, 2026

Eight (stylized as Ei8ht) is the eighth studio album by American rock band Shinedown, released by Atlantic Records on May 29, 2026. The album spawned six singles, "Three Six Five", "Dance, Kid, Dance", "Killing Fields", "Searchlight", "Safe and Sound", and "Young Again", along with four promotional singles, "Outlaw", "Burning Down the Disco", "At the Bottom", and "Dizzy".

== Background and recording ==
The first hint regarding the next album was shared by lead singer Brent Smith, who suggested the eighth album was already written before the release of Planet Zero. In a 2023 interview, Smith stated the album was set for release in 2024, and said "there are some really, really good songs".

The album was produced and mixed by bassist Eric Bass, the third to be handled by Bass following Attention Attention and Planet Zero. It was written and recorded in Bass' Big Animal Studio in Charleston, South Carolina.

== Release and promotion ==
On January 24, 2025, the band released two singles, "Three Six Five" and "Dance, Kid, Dance" as the lead singles for the album. On July 15, 2025, the album's third single, "Killing Fields", was released. A music video for the song was released on October 28. On November 18, 2025, the band released the single, "Searchlight", along with a music video. Eight was announced on February 17, 2026, alongside the fifth single, "Safe and Sound". The album's sixth single, "Outlaw", was released on April 2.

The album topped the Billboard Top Hard Rock Albums chart in its first week, selling 38,000 equivalent units in the United States.

== Critical reception ==
Professional ratings
Aggregate scores
Source	Rating
Metacritic	75/100
Review scores
Source	Rating
AllMusic	3.5/5 stars
Associated Press	4/5 stars
Blabbermouth.net	9/10
Classic Rock	8/10 stars
Distorted Sound	7/10
Kerrang!	4/5
Metal Hammer	6/10 stars
PopMatters	8/10
Spill Magazine	4/5 stars
Sputnikmusic	2.5/5

According to the review aggregator Metacritic, Eight received "generally favorable reviews" based on a weighted average score of 75 out of 100 from 5 critic scores.

== Track listing ==
Eight track listing
No.	Title	Writer(s)	Length
1.	"At the Bottom"	Eric Bass; Brent Smith	3:49
2.	"Dance, Kid, Dance"	Bass; Smith; Dave Bassett	3:32
3.	"Burning Down the Disco"	Bass; Zach Myers; Smith; Bassett	2:51
4.	"Three Six Five"	Bass; Smith	3:40
5.	"Young Again"	Bass; Smith	3:36
6.	"Dizzy"	Bass; Smith; Bassett	3:41
7.	"Imposter"	Bass; Smith; Bassett	3:37
8.	"Machine Gun"	Bass; Smith	3:31
9.	"Outlaw"	Bass; Smith; Bassett	3:35
10.	"Safe and Sound"	Bass; Smith; Myers; Bassett	3:21
11.	"Searchlight"	Bass; Smith; Bassett	3:34
12.	"Bear with Me"	Bass; Smith	3:25
13.	"Deep End"	Bass; Smith; Bassett	3:27
14.	"Killing Fields"	Bass; Smith; Bassett	3:43
15.	"Back to the Living"	Bass; Myers; Smith; Bassett	3:45
16.	"Wide Open"	Bass; Smith	3:46
17.	"So Glad That You Asked"	Bass; Myers; Smith; Bassett	4:04
18.	"The Pilot"	Bass; Smith; Bassett	3:31
Total length:			64:28

Walmart bonus track
No.	Title	Writer(s)	Length
19.	"Young Again (acoustic version)"	Bass; Smith	3:21

Japanese bonus track
No.	Title	Writer(s)	Length
19.	"Imposter (acoustic version)"	Bass; Smith; Bassett	3:02

== Personnel ==
Credits adapted from Tidal.

=== Shinedown ===
- Eric Bass – bass, programming, production, engineering, mixing, orchestral arrangements, string arrangements, bass technician, guitar technician
- Barry Kerch – drums
- Zach Myers – guitar
- Brent Smith – vocals

=== Additional contributors ===
- Dave Bassett – vocal production (all tracks), additional instrumentation (tracks 1–9, 12, 13, 15–18), backing vocals (3, 6, 7, 17), synthesizer (7, 17), strings (9, 17), lap steel guitar (9), synthesizer programming (13), piano (17)
- Ted Jensen – mastering
- Eric Wayne Rickert – engineering assistance
- Ricky Sanders – drum technician

== Charts ==
Chart performance for Eight
Chart (2026)	Peak position
Australian Albums (ARIA)	7
Austrian Albums (Ö3 Austria)	17
Belgian Albums (Ultratop Flanders)	131
Canadian Albums (Billboard)	49
Croatian International Albums (HDU)	4
French Physical Albums (SNEP)	108
German Albums (Offizielle Top 100)	23
German Rock & Metal Albums (Offizielle Top 100)	9
Hungarian Physical Albums (MAHASZ)	9
Japanese Rock Albums (Oricon)	13
Japanese Western Albums (Oricon)	22
New Zealand Albums (RMNZ)	21
Scottish Albums (Official Charts)	3
Swiss Albums (Schweizer Hitparade)	14
UK Albums (Official Charts)	8
UK Rock & Metal Albums (Official Charts)	1
US Billboard 200	12
US Top Hard Rock Albums (Billboard)	1
US Top Rock & Alternative Albums (Billboard)	3
