= Big Bad Wolf (In This Moment song) =

Single by In This Moment

from the album Black Widow
- A-side: "Sick Like Me"
- Released: October 21, 2014
- Genre: Nu metal
- Length: 5:12
- Label: Atlantic
- Songwriter: In This Moment

In This Moment singles chronology
"Sick Like Me" (2014)	"Big Bad Wolf" (2014)	"Sex Metal Barbie" (2015)

Music video
- "Big Bad Wolf" on YouTube

"Big Bad Wolf" is a song by American rock band In This Moment. It is the second single from the band's fifth album Black Widow.

== About the song ==
The song was initially leaked online on October 12, 2014, and released digitally as an instant preorder track on October 21, 2014. The song appeared as a B-side on the physical Sick Like Me single.

The music video was directed by Robert Kley and Maria Brink and premiered on their YouTube channel on November 28, 2014. Brink says of the video, "It is one of my favorite videos we've ever done, and it is super. It's just raw and gritty and almost nasty, but it's very different and I'm very excited for people to see it. It's very creaturous; I think I have creature parts to myself, but my blood girls are wearing these, like, big werewolf masks that...You've just got to see it. If I try to describe it, it almost can sound campy, but when you see it it's not. It's almost like a twisted horror story, but in this cool, artistic way." The song is about the struggles between the light and the dark that is represented by the "wolf" and the "piggy" within Brink. She says, "It’s the internal struggle of those two animals in me, but I realize both are very necessary for all of us. I need to embrace that fire, be wild and primal. That’s important too.” The song was released as the album's second radio single in September 2015.

On June 29, 2022, the single was certified Gold by the Recording Industry Association of America (RIAA), moving 500,000 copies in the United States.

== Track listing ==
All lyrics are written by Maria Brink; all music is composed by In This Moment, Kevin Churko.

"Sick Like Me" CD Single
No.	Title	Length
1.	"Sick Like Me"	5:00
2.	"Big Bad Wolf"	5:10
Total length:		10:10

== Personnel ==
- Maria Brink – lead vocals, piano
- Chris Howorth – lead guitar, backing vocals,
- Randy Weitzel – rhythm guitar
- Travis Johnson - bass guitar
- Tom Hane – drums, percussions

== Certifications ==
Region	Certification	Certified units/sales
United States (RIAA)	Gold	500,000^{‡}
^{‡} Sales+streaming figures based on certification alone.
