= Planet Zero =

Studio album by Shinedown
- Released: July 1, 2022
- Recorded: 2021
- Studio: Big Animal Studio (Charleston, South Carolina)
- Length: 48:54
- Label: Atlantic
- Producer: Eric Bass

Shinedown chronology
Attention Attention (2018)	Planet Zero (2022)	Eight (2026)

Singles from Planet Zero
- 1. "Planet Zero" Released: January 26, 2022; 2. "Daylight" Released: June 1, 2022; 3. "Dead Don't Die" Released: January 17, 2023; 4. "A Symptom of Being Human" Released: February 22, 2023

Planet Zero is the seventh studio album by American rock band Shinedown, released by Atlantic Records on July 1, 2022. The release date was originally set for April 22, 2022, but was postponed due to a delay in CD and vinyl production. The album topped the all-genre Billboard Top Album Sales chart, a first for the band. Music videos were made for the title track, "Daylight", "Dead Don't Die", and "A Symptom of Being Human".

== Background and recording ==
Planet Zero was announced on January 26, 2022, alongside the lead single of the same name. It was produced and mixed by bassist Eric Bass, making it the second album to be handled by Bass following Attention Attention. It was written and recorded during the COVID-19 pandemic in Bass' newly built Big Animal Studio in Charleston, South Carolina. The process initially began in South Carolina, then continued in California for additional engineering and production on the album.

Guitarist Zach Myers said in March 2022 that no reverb was utilized on the album. The sound is described by lead singer Brent Smith as much more stripped down in terms of sound than previous records. He also describes it as "controversial" and it would touch upon subjects that the band has shied away from in the past. In January 2022, Smith stated about making Planet Zero, "This time around we pushed everything to the front for the listeners, not layering so many things or having a lot of effects or cues or things of that nature." He further elaborated, "There was a lot of self-doubt, a lot of wondering if I should mix it or not, that type of thing. I had a lot of disdain for it the whole time I was making it. But in the end I think that's what gives it its edge." Drummer Berry Kerch said about writing the album, "it was, holy shit, we are in the middle of a pandemic, everybody hates each other, there are riots, the world is falling apart in front of our faces, and social media is just [exacerbating] this."

== Album title and meaning ==
According to Eric Bass in January 2022, the album title came from a nickname he came up with about the United States, saying:

It seemed like there was zero intelligence, zero tolerance for anybody's opinion, zero accountability for anything.

Brent Smith described the album as "a warning that if we don't start to view everything through a human lens...we could be headed for a really, really bad place." He said in February 2022, "Planet Zero was written for all of us. The fact is that we're all here on this planet no matter what, so it's time to actually move forward together with empathy, perseverance and strength." In March 2023, Barry Kerch said the overall message is:

It's about getting along with each other and loving each other even if you have differences. I think that's the biggest takeaway we hope people get.

== Concept and themes ==
Planet Zero is a concept album about various topics such as "growing toxic intolerance" and "the pitfalls of social media, mental health issues, political divisiveness, partisan media and cancel culture." The concept involves Cyren, an AI figure in a dystopia that controls the daily activities of the Earth's population, determining what is acceptable or unacceptable for people to engage in. During an interview in July 2022, guitarist Zach Myers said the album is "not necessarily autobiographical", but instead about "what's happening in this world and the things that have gone down".

The album's themes include "personal struggles, growth, emotional rebirth and overcoming negativity" as well as rejecting authoritarianism and fascism, forced conformity, the oppression of independent thinking and freedom of speech, and the negative impact and consequences of censorship. Smith stated in November 2022 that, like with Shinedown's previous releases, the album had "no censorship." Myers said in an interview that Planet Zero was not originally intended to be a concept album.

== Release and promotion ==
On January 26, 2022, the band released the lead single, "Planet Zero". The album was originally set to be released on April 22, 2022. The single went on to reach number one on the Billboard Mainstream Rock Airplay chart on the March 5, 2022 dated chart and remained atop the tally for eight weeks. On March 25, the band released a second song, "The Saints of Violence and Innuendo". On April 12, the band announced that the album's release was being pushed back to July 1, 2022. The delay was due to a delay in vinyl production, and the band's desire to have all their fans experience the album at the same time in all formats. On June 1, the band released the second single, "Daylight". On June 21, the band launched the "Planet Zero Observer", an augmented reality web app. The app visualized the planet in orbit, along with interactive symbols that revealed exclusive teasers. The album sold 43,000 copies during its first week, with 30,000 sales being on physical media and 13,000 being digital.

== Reception ==
Professional ratings
Review scores
Source	Rating
AllMusic	3.5/5 stars
Cryptic Rock	5/5 stars
Distorted Sound Magazine	8/10 stars
Kerrang!	4/5 stars
Louder Sound	4/5 stars
Melodic	3/5 stars

Planet Zero received primarily positive reception from critics. Jazmin L'Amy of Distorted Sound Magazine gave Planet Zero an eight out of ten score, saying that the band "revert back to full-form whilst still experimenting and evolving their sound in a manner that will keep fans happy as well as themselves." Planet Zero was given three out of five stars by Johan Wippsson on Melodic, who called it "a good and well-written record" despite being "contrived". Both Kerrang! and Louder Sound gave it a score of four out of five, with Steve Beebee of the former calling Planet Zero "both considered and considerate. Its pacing is especially to be admired as is its caring assessment of what fear and confusion has done to our humanity." and Hugh Fielder of the latter saying "the band utilise the well-honed dynamics of their visceral arena rock as a potent soundtrack." The album received three and a half out of five stars on Allmusic, saying it "features a more stripped-back sound than on their previous albums." Cryptic Rock gave Planet Zero a perfect score, speaking positively about the band "fearlessly saying what they want to say." on the album, summarizing the review with, "Planet Zero does not at all letdown but instead offers plenty of moments where your heart, soul, and ears will be tingling all at once."

== Track listing ==
Planet Zero track listing
No.	Title	Writer(s)	Length
1.	"2184" (instrumental)	Eric Bass	0:22
2.	"No Sleep Tonight"	Brent Smith; Dave Bassett; Bass	2:30
3.	"Planet Zero"	Smith; Bass	3:42
4.	"Welcome"	Bass	0:34
5.	"Dysfunctional You"	Smith; Bass	3:37
6.	"Dead Don't Die"	Blair Daly; Smith; Bass; Zac Maloy; Zach Myers	3:14
7.	"Standardized Experiences"	Bass	0:42
8.	"America Burning"	Smith; Bass	3:43
9.	"Do Not Panic"	Bass	0:33
10.	"A Symptom of Being Human"	Smith; Bass	4:08
11.	"Hope"	Smith; Bassett; Bass; Myers	3:38
12.	"A More Utopian Future"	Bass	0:33
13.	"Clueless and Dramatic"	Smith; Bassett; Bass; Myers	3:06
14.	"Sure Is Fun"	Smith; Bass; Myers	3:00
15.	"Daylight"	Smith; Bassett; Bass; Myers	4:00
16.	"This Is a Warning"	Bass	0:50
17.	"The Saints of Violence and Innuendo"	Smith; Bass	3:40
18.	"Army of the Underappreciated"	Smith; Bassett; Bass; Myers	3:13
19.	"Delete"	Bass	0:36
20.	"What You Wanted"	Smith; Bass	3:03
Total length:			48:54

== Personnel ==
Album credits adapted from liner notes.

Shinedown

- Brent Smith – vocals
- Zach Myers – guitar
- Eric Bass – bass guitar, production, mixing, engineering, orchestral/string arrangements
- Barry Kerch – drums

Additional personnel

- Doug McKean – engineer
- Dave Bassett – additional production, additional engineering
- Eric Wayne Rickert – engineering assistance
- Jeremy "Hoogie" Donais – bass technician, guitar technician
- Mike Fasano – drum technician
- Mark Obriski – art direction, design
- Mark Stutzman – illustration
- Ted Jensen – mastering at Sterling Sound (Nashville, Tennessee)

== Charts ==
=== Weekly charts ===
Weekly chart performance for Planet Zero
Chart (2022)	Peak position
Australian Digital Albums (ARIA)	5
Australian Physical Albums (ARIA)	48
Austrian Albums (Ö3 Austria)	21
Belgian Albums (Ultratop Flanders)	113
Canadian Albums (Billboard)	46
German Albums (Offizielle Top 100)	15
Japanese Hot Albums (Billboard Japan)	99
Scottish Albums (Official Charts)	2
Swiss Albums (Schweizer Hitparade)	10
UK Albums (Official Charts)	4
UK Rock & Metal Albums (Official Charts)	1
US Billboard 200	5
US Top Alternative Albums (Billboard)	1
US Top Hard Rock Albums (Billboard)	1
US Top Rock Albums (Billboard)	1

=== Year-end charts ===
Year-end chart performance for Planet Zero
Chart (2022)	Position
US Top Album Sales (Billboard)	89

=== Singles ===
Year	Single	Peak positions				
Year	Single	US Main. Rock	US Alt. Airplay	US Rock & Alternative	US Pop Airplay	US Adult Pop Airplay
2022	"Planet Zero"	1	36	28	-	-
2022	"Daylight"	1	22	31	-	31
2023	"Dead Don't Die"	2	-	-	-	-
2023	"A Symptom of Being Human"	1	8	17	19	15

== Appearances ==
- "No Sleep Tonight" was featured on the soundtrack to the video game NHL 23 in 2022.
