= Eric Bass =

American rock musician

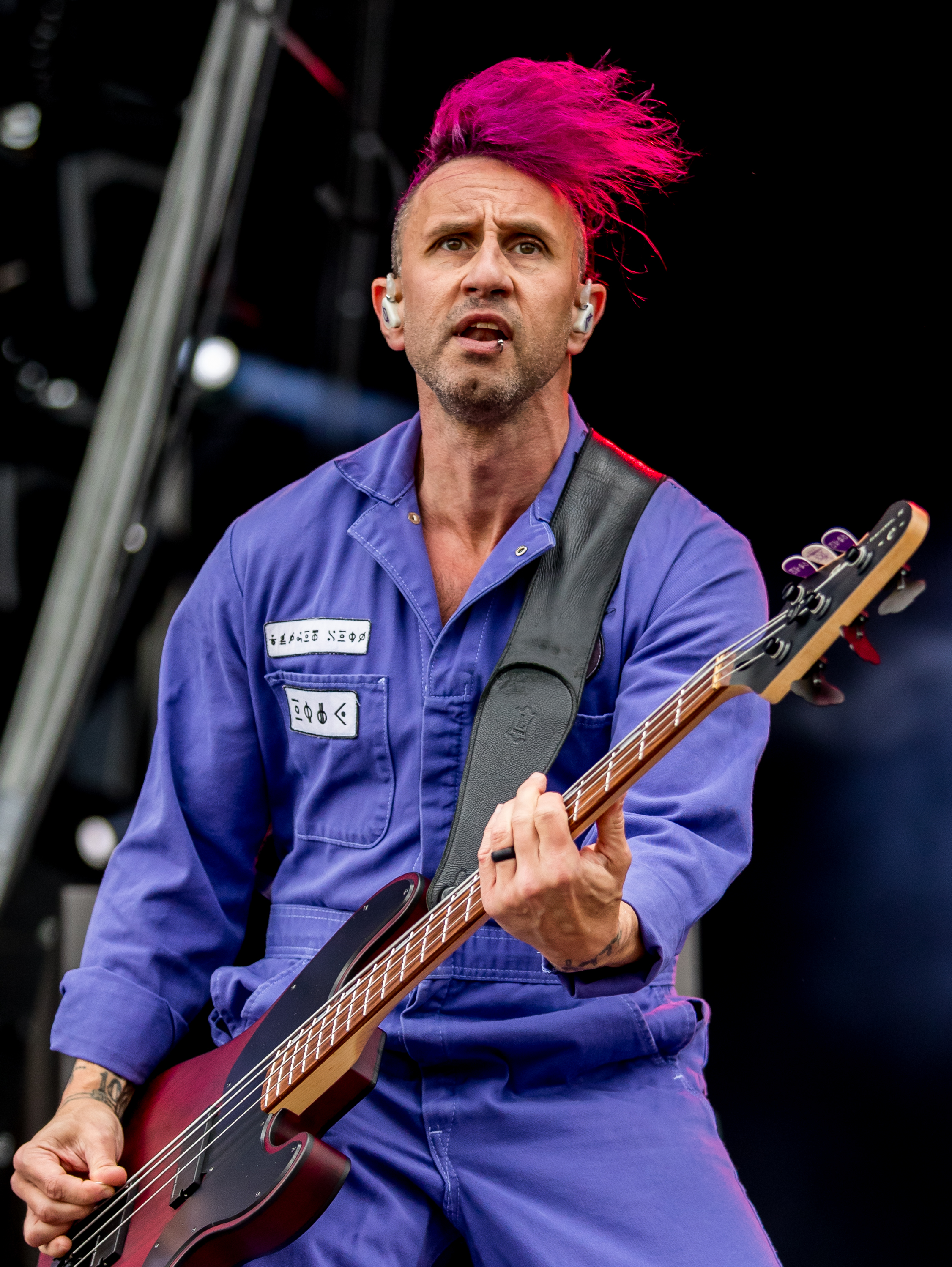
- Bass performing with Shinedown in 2022

Background information
- Born: William Frederic Bass Jr. October 23, 1974 (age 52)
- Origin: Charleston, South Carolina, U.S.
- Genres: Hard rock; alternative metal; post-grunge; alternative rock; pop rock; southern rock
- Occupations: Musician; record producer; songwriter
- Instruments: Bass guitar; guitar; piano; vocals
- Member of: Shinedown
- Formerly of: Deepfield

William Frederic "Eric" Bass Jr. (born October 23, 1974) is an American musician and record producer. He is the bassist of the rock band Shinedown. He is currently signed to ONErpm as a solo artist.

== Personal life ==
Bass was born into a conservative, and very musical family, and was encouraged to sing and play piano from an early age. At 13 he received a trombone, before moving onto guitar the following Christmas. In high school he played drums in the marching band, which he recalls as being "rhythmically invaluable to me throughout my music career".

Bass currently lives in Charleston, SC with his wife and their two dogs. He owned a recording studio called Ocean Industries Studios (www.32tracks.com), which was his second studio, and now owns a studio called "Big Animal Studio", in which he recorded and produced Planet Zero.

Bass is known to have depression, which influenced his work, especially in Shinedown's sixth album, Attention Attention, which was influenced by Bass' condition along with frontman Brent Smith's addiction.

In September 2021, it was reported that Bass tested positive for COVID-19, and would miss a few shows during the band's tour.

== Career ==
=== Sheldon ===
In the late 90s Eric played guitar for Charleston rock band Sheldon.

=== Deepfield ===
In 2002 Eric formed Deepfield with Baxter Teal. By 2003 they were signed to In De Goot records/McGathy Promotions, and began to produce their first record. However, Eric soon left the band after becoming more and more drawn by the producing, recording and studio process.

=== Shinedown ===
Bass joined Shinedown in 2008, before the release of The Sound of Madness, as a permanent replacement for Brad Stewart. He did not record the album with the band (the album's bass parts were contributed by noted session bassist Chris Chaney), but was touring with them. In addition to his bass duties, he also plays the keyboard in concert and contributes backing vocals.

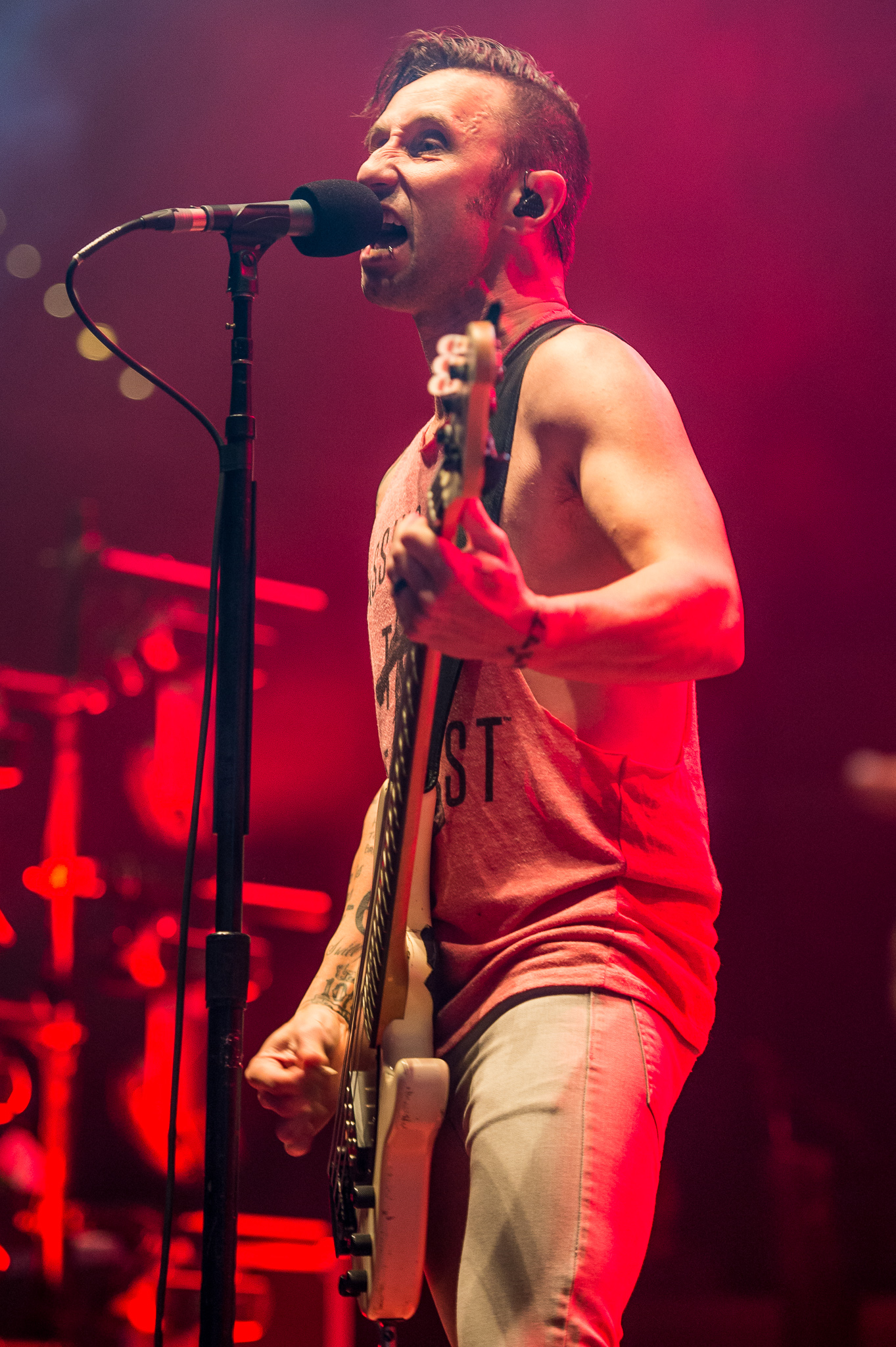
Bass performing in 2016

Bass soon became a prominent member in Shinedown, and wrote many of their songs, starting in Amaryllis. After producing a few singles for the band, such as "Diamond Eyes" and "Cut the Cord", in 2018 he produced Shinedown's sixth album, Attention Attention, and in 2022 he produced their seventh album, Planet Zero in his new studio, "Big Animal Studio". Four years after the seventh Shinedown record, Planet Zero, Shinedown’s eighth studio record Eight, was also produced by Bass.

On July 10, 2026, Bass announced that he would be taking a hiatus from touring to focus on his mental health.

=== Solo career ===
In November 2024 Bass announced a solo project. The first single, "Mind Control", was released on November 13, 2024, as the first single from his solo album titled I Had a Name set for release on February 28, 2025. On December 13, 2024, he released "Azalia", the second single from the album.

=== Influences ===
Bass never learned to play a guitar (or a bass guitar), and is self taught.

He was influenced by bass players Robert DeLeo (Stone Temple Pilots), Chris Wolstenholme (Muse), Tim Commerford (Rage Against the Machine), and producers Rich Costey, Brendan O'Brien, Howard Benson, Andy Wallace, Chris Lord-Alge.

=== Producer ===
- Framing Hanley – The Sum of Who We Are (2014)
- Sleeper Agent – About Last Night (2014)
- Cold Kingdom – Cold Kingdom (2017)
- Shinedown – Attention Attention (2018)
- Shinedown – Planet Zero (2022)
- Shinedown – Eight (2026)

=== Equipment ===
- 2008–2012 – Ernie Ball Music Man Sterling Bass
- 2012–2019 – Dean Eric Bass Hillsboro Bass
- 2019–present – Prestige Eric Bass Signature Bass

=== Solo Album ===
- I Had a Name (2025)

== Singles ==
List of singles as lead artist, with selected chart positions and certifications, showing year released and album name
Title	Year	Peak chart positions	Album
Title	Year	US Main.	Album
"Goodnight, Goodnight"	2025	33	I Had a Name
