= Shinedown =

American rock band

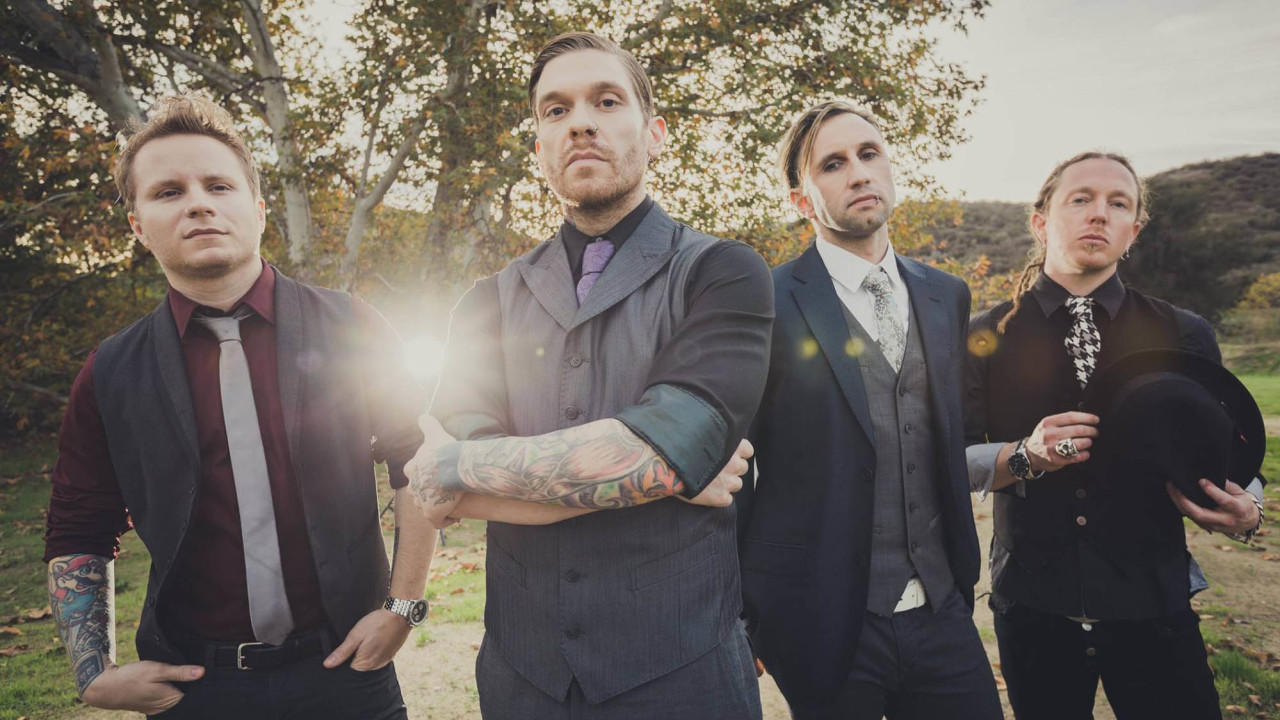
- Shinedown in 2012. From left to right: Zach Myers, Brent Smith, Eric Bass and Barry Kerch.

Background information
- Origin: Jacksonville, Florida, U.S.
- Genres: Hard rock; alternative metal; post-grunge; alternative rock; pop rock
- Works: Shinedown discography
- Years active: 2001–present
- Labels: Atlantic; Roadrunner
- Members: Brent Smith; Barry Kerch; Zach Myers; Eric Bass
- Past members: Nick Perri; Jasin Todd; Brad Stewart
- Website: shinedown.com

Shinedown is an American rock band from Jacksonville, Florida, formed by singer Brent Smith in 2001 after the dissolution of his previous band, Dreve. Smith, still under contract with record label Atlantic Records, recruited the band's original lineup of Jasin Todd as guitarist, Brad Stewart on bass, and Barry Kerch on drums. Consistent for the first two album cycles, several lineup changes followed in the late 2000s, eventually stabilizing with Smith and Kerch alongside Zach Myers on guitar and Eric Bass on bass. The group has released eight studio albums: Leave a Whisper (2003), Us and Them (2005), The Sound of Madness (2008), Amaryllis (2012), Threat to Survival (2015), Attention Attention (2018), and Planet Zero (2022). The band's eighth album, Eight, was released on May 29, 2026.

Shinedown has the most number one singles on the Billboard Mainstream Rock charts with 24, and all of their released singles have reached the top five on the chart. Additionally, on June 3, 2021, Shinedown was ranked number one by Billboard on the Greatest of All Time Mainstreams Rock Artists chart released to celebrate the Mainstream Rock chart's 40th anniversary. To date, the band has sold more than 10 million records worldwide. In 2025, Jeff Mezydlo of Yardbarker included the band in his list of "the greatest metal acts that formed in the 2000s".

== History ==
=== 2000–2004: Formation and Leave a Whisper ===
The band's origins trace back to frontman Brent Smith's prior band, Dreve, which had signed a record deal with Atlantic Records in 2000. The record label, unhappy with Dreve as a whole, dropped the band prior to releasing an album, but retained Smith, who they felt was worth developing separately as an artist. Atlantic signed Smith to a development deal where record representatives helped him with his song writing ability, and helped him recruit members for a new band, which would become Shinedown. Smith moved to Jacksonville, Florida and began work on the project in 2001. The first member he recruited was bassist Brad Stewart, through local Jacksonville music producer Pete Thornton. Smith and Stewart began recording demos together in a small local studio, whose owner recommended they meet with her fiancé, guitarist Jasin Todd, who Smith brought in as the third member. The original lineup was rounded out by drummer Barry Kerch, who was the seventh drummer the band had auditioned for the spot. The four worked together on creating demos, and submitted their work-in-progress material to Atlantic, who approved of the material and green-lighted a full-length album.

The resulting work was the band's debut album, Leave a Whisper, which was released May 27, 2003. While not an immediate success, through the extensive touring and successful singles, eventually certified platinum by the RIAA in the United States, indicating sales of over 1 million. Four singles were released from the album: "Fly from the Inside", "45", a cover of the Lynyrd Skynyrd song "Simple Man", and "Burning Bright". All four singles charted in the top five of the Billboard Mainstream Rock charts, peaking at fifth, third, fifth, and second, respectively. The band toured extensively in support of the album, playing over 400 live shows over the course of 2003 and 2004. The band ended up touring for 24 months straight, doing various tours with Van Halen, Seether and 3 Doors Down. The band later released a live DVD titled Live from the Inside that documented the live shows of the touring cycle.

=== 2005–2006: Us and Them ===
The band did not start work on a follow-up album until 2005, with the band finding the touring lifestyle too hectic to start writing or recording material. This, however, left the band with limited time to record new music, with their record label pressuring the band to get the album out in a six-month time period. Despite the time restrictions, the label did not pressure the band on the album's musical direction after the commercial success of Leave a Whisper. The band worked with music producer Tony Battaglia, and chose to go in a more "mature" and "stripped down" direction for the album's sound, Kerch describing it as just "pure rock." During the same time, the band was also approached by Hollywood Records to record a song for a tribute album for the band Queen, something the band agreed to out of their respect for the band. They recorded a cover of the track "Tie Your Mother Down," which was released on Killer Queen: A Tribute to Queen (2005).

The band released their second studio album, Us and Them, on October 4, 2005. The album debuted higher than Leave a Whisper on the Billboard 200 chart, peaking at number 23 versus Leave a Whisper's number 53 peak, but the album ultimately sold less than its predecessor. Despite this, the band's three singles from the album, "Save Me", "I Dare You", and "Heroes" ended up being more successful than their prior album's singles. The lead single, "Save Me" was the band's first to reach the number one spot on the Mainstream Rock Charts, and held the position for twelve weeks in a row. The second single, "I Dare You", also peaked at number 2 on the same chart. Notably, both songs were also the band's first to have crossover success on the Billboard Hot 100 charts, hitting 72 and 88 respectively.

The band again toured heavily in support of the album, including the 2006 iteration of the SnoCore Tour with Seether, Flyleaf, and Halestorm, and later opening for Godsmack and Rob Zombie co-headlining tour of North America. Promotional support came from other areas as well; then-American Idol contestant Chris Daughtry performed "I Dare You" live on the show, helping its crossover appeal, and was used as a theme song for WrestleMania 22. The success of the singles helped propel sales of the album in the long run, ultimately being certified platinum by the RIAA on March 19, 2018, signifying 1 million album sales.

=== 2007–2010: The Sound of Madness ===
Work on a third studio album began in early 2007. While the record label requested an album to be created in six months, Smith declined, stating that he was not happy with the results of working under the time restraints on the last album, and wished to take his time on the album. The label agreed to this, ultimately allowing Smith to take 18 months to prep the album. Part of the long development time was due to internal issues within band members; during this time, Smith fired both Stewart and Todd from the band. Smith let Stewart go due to disagreements with the direction of the band, feeling that Stewart was no longer happy or committed to the band. Todd was fired due to major disagreements with Smith, and personal problems that were getting in the way of the band. Then-touring guitarist, Zach Myers, later recounted that both Smith and Todd were going through significant substance abuse issues at the time with drugs and alcohol, which lead to much infighting between the two. The band almost broke up during the period, but Smith firing Todd and stopping his drug use helped eliminate the internal issues, and helped the band move forward.

Smith spent much of 2007 writing new material with Rick Beato of Black Dog Sound Recording Studios in Stone Mountain, GA, for the third album. Sessions were prolific, with Smith writing over 60 songs during the period, though that he now lacked a guitarist and bassist was a constant concern. Smith recruited a number of studio musicians for its recording sessions; Dave Barrett contributed most of the album's guitars, Tim Pierce contributed some additional guitar, and Chris Chaney contributed most of the album's bass guitar. The rough demos were sent from the record label to music producer Rob Cavallo, who, upon hearing them, told Smith he wanted to produce the album.

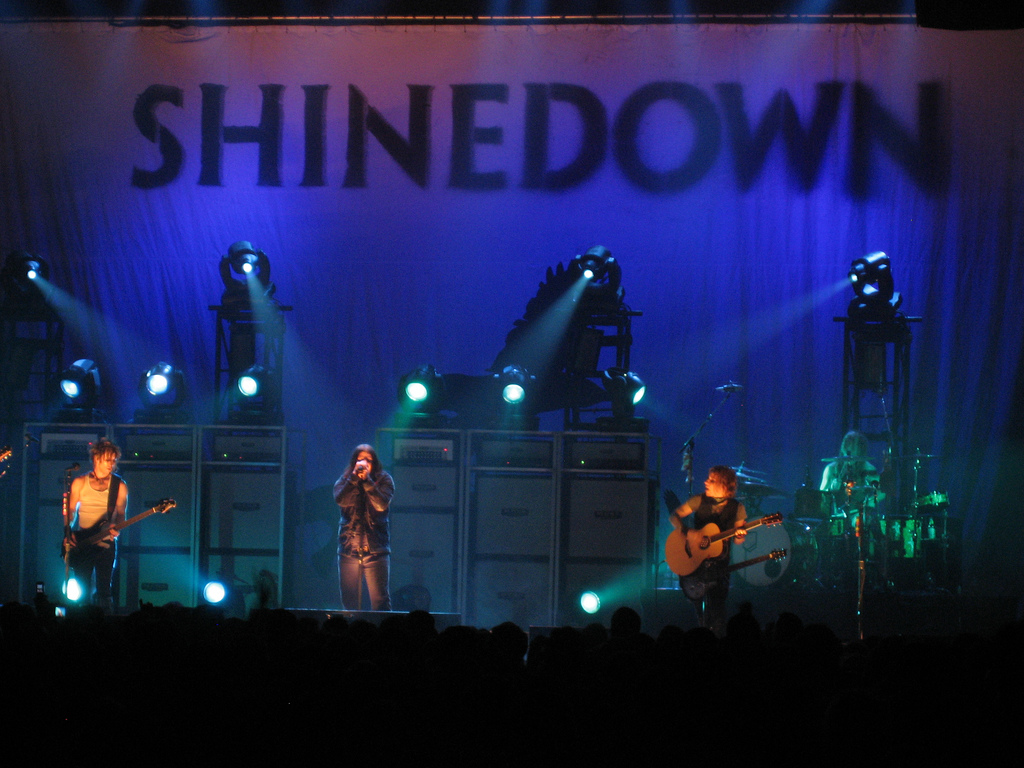
Shinedown live in 2008

The final result, The Sound of Madness, was released on June 24, 2008. It debuted at number eight on the Billboard 200 top album charts, selling 50,000 copies in its opening week. In order to start touring in support of the album, Smith assembled a new official lineup for the band, consisting of Nick Perri of Silvertide on lead guitar, Eric Bass on bass guitar, and upgrading touring member, Zach Myers to a permanent rhythm guitarist position. Perri toured only briefly with the band in 2008, before leaving to pursue a solo career, a move Smith was fine with, as he felt the band operated better as a quartet, leaving Myers as the primary guitarist.

Through multiple successful single releases, and extensive touring, the album ended up being the band's best-selling, staying on the Billboard 200 charts for 120 consecutive weeks, and eventually being certified double platinum in the United States, indicating two million units sold. Six singles were released from the album: "Devour", "Second Chance", "Sound of Madness", "If You Only Knew", "The Crow & the Butterfly", and "Diamond Eyes (Boom-Lay Boom-Lay Boom)"; each one topping a Billboard rock music chart. Of particular note was "Second Chance", which crossed over to the top 10 of the Billboard Hot 100, peaking at number 7, and eventually being certified triple platinum, indicating three million units of the single sold.

The band, with its new lineup, once again toured extensively in support of the album release, spending over two years on live performances. Of note, the band headlined the "Carnival of Madness" tour, which involved larger, 10,000 capacity arena venues, and a later "Anything and Everything Tour," which involved acoustic performances in smaller venues and Q&A (question and answer) sessions with the crowd. Somewhere in the Stratosphere, a live album/DVD, was released in May 2011, documenting performances from both tours.

=== 2011–2014: Amaryllis ===
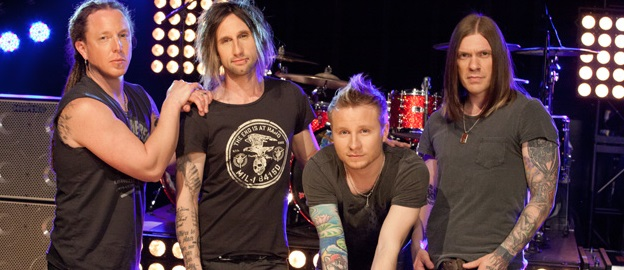
Shinedown in 2012

Work on a fourth studio album began in February 2011, with the band spending the first half of the year writing and demoing over 33 songs. The band again decided to work with Cavallo as a producer, but moved into a new sound and lyrical direction on the album, capturing a more of a message of "empowerment, perseverance, and inspiration", inspired by Smith's then-recent change of getting sober and living a healthier lifestyle, and the new band members contributing to the writing process for the first time on an album. The recording process wrapped up about a year later in February 2012, and the album, Amaryllis, was released the next month, on March 27, 2012, in 30 countries simultaneously, through a joint release between Atlantic and Roadrunner Records in countries Atlantic did not distribute into. Amaryllis debuted at number four on the Billboard 200 charts, selling 106,000 copies in its opening week. While the opening sales doubled the debut of The Sound of Madness, overall sales fell well short, with the album only being certified Gold, indicating a half million copies sold.

Five singles were released from the album: "Bully", "Unity", "Enemies", "I'll Follow You", and "Adrenaline". The band's singles once again fared well, albeit it slightly below The Sound of Madness singles; "Bully" and "Unity" topped the Billboard Mainstream Rock Charts, "Enemies" and "I'll Follow You" peaked at number 2, and "Adrenaline" peaked at number 4. Additionally, only "Bully" managed to have any cross-over success, breaking into the Billboard Top 100 chart at number 94 and eventually being certified Gold as well. Shinedown also contributed the non-album song titled "I'm Alive" to the soundtrack of the 2012 film The Avengers.

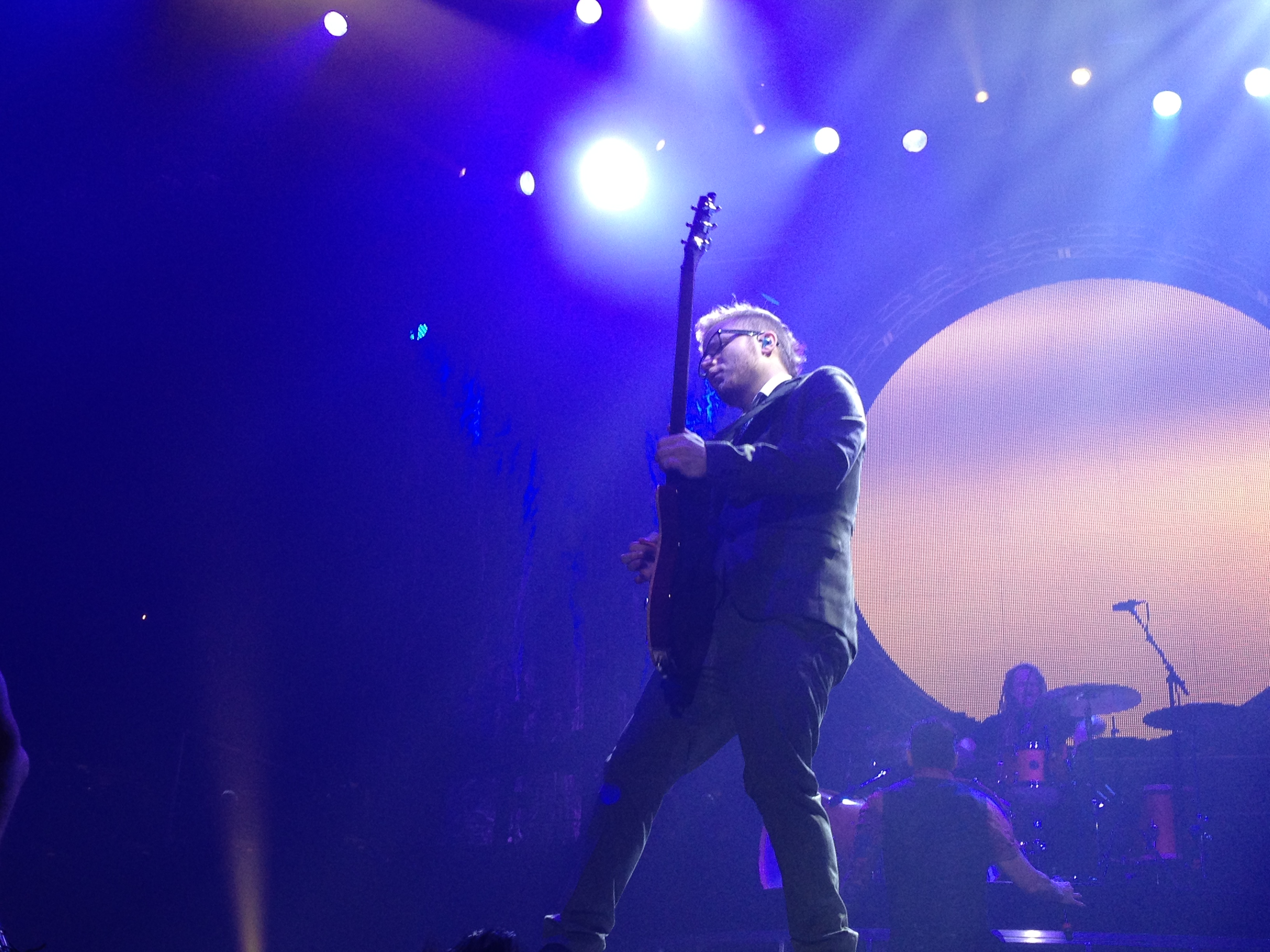
Zach Myers performing in 2013

In November 2012, Smith announced in an NME interview that a follow up Shinedown album had already been recorded. Smith stated "We have another record of material. It's actually recorded...It's still very massive, it still has an epic feel to it all, but the tempo is a little slower, and the subject matter is a little different. I would say it's actually a bit darker, a little bit more mischievous." Despite the announcement, the band proceeded to continue on with the Amaryllis touring cycle, touring through 2013 to complete another two year touring cycle. Shinedown and Three Days Grace embarked on a co-headlined tour beginning in February 2013, and went on another iteration of the yearly "Carnival of Madness" tour with Papa Roach in later 2013.

In April 2013, Smith and Myers recorded ten acoustic cover songs, selected out of a pool of over 4,000 fan requests, selecting a variety of different types of songs, from Metallica's "Nothing Else Matters" to Adele's "Someone Like You". The tracks were released across two separate EPs, Acoustic Sessions on January 28, 2014, and Acoustic Sessions Pt. 2 on March 28, 2014, with performance videos created for every track on the first EP. The band took much of 2014 off, a rarity for the band, which had pretty consistently moved back and forth between recording and touring for each album cycle. The time off was for the band to rest, specifically Smith, who had damaged his vocal cords and contracted oral thrush from the constant years of touring prior.

=== 2015–2016: Threat to Survival ===
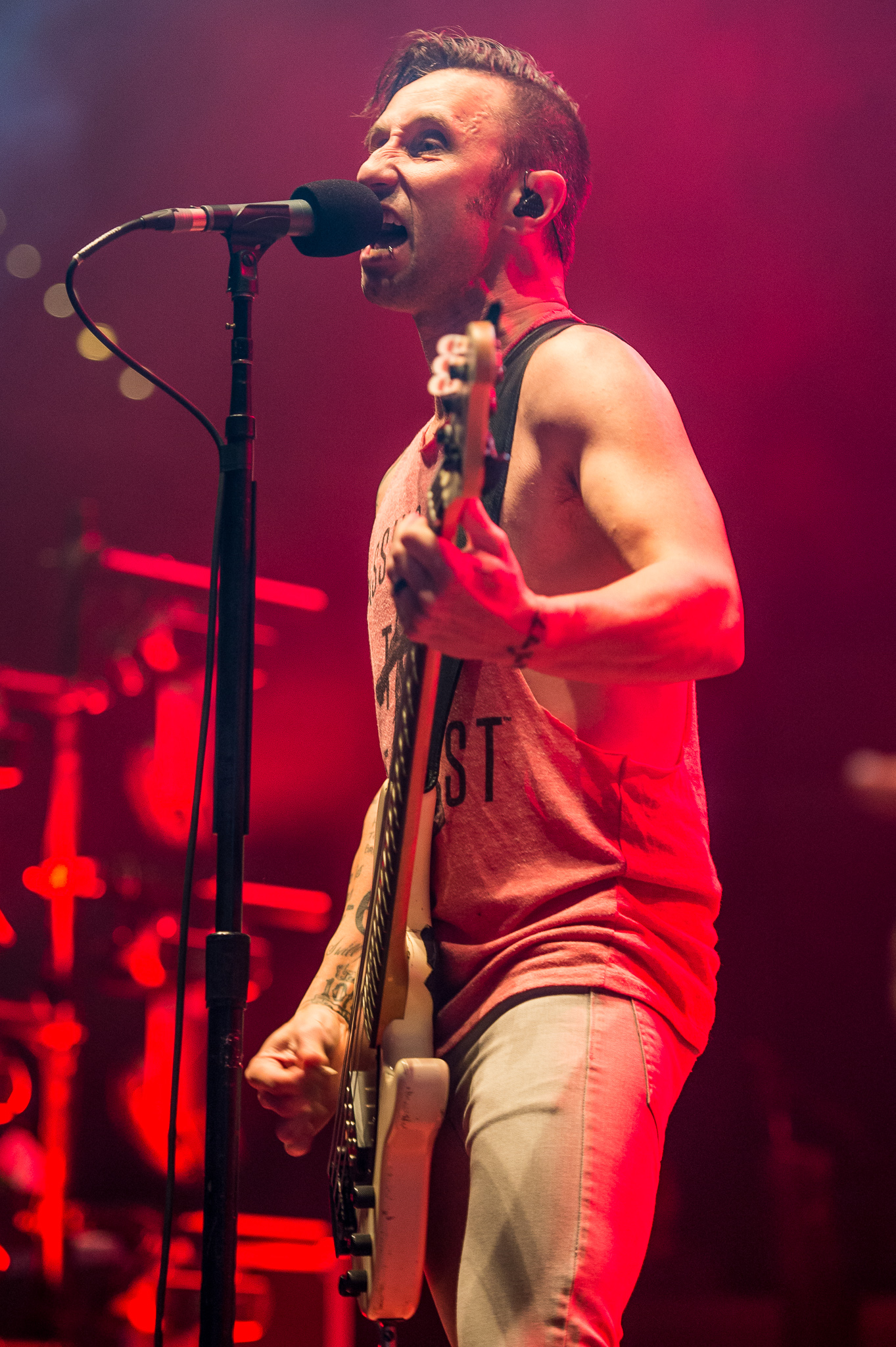
Eric Bass performing in 2016

Recording for the band's fifth studio album began in January 2015, with a goal of a July or August release date. The band later embarked on a summer headlining tour with Nothing More. The first single from the album, "Cut the Cord" was released in June 2015, ahead of the album's release. Two more promotional songs were released in August as well, "Black Cadillac" and "State of My Head".

In August 2015, the band announced the name of the album, Threat to Survival, and its release date of September 18, 2015. The album debuted at number six on the Billboard 200, selling 65,000 in the first week, lower than their prior album, Amaryllis. Despite the drop in sales, the band still found success in their singles. Four singles were released from the album, and three of the four singles - "Cut the Cord", "State of My Head", and "How Did You Love" hit number one on the US Mainstream Rock charts, while the other, "Asking for It", peaked at number two. After the album's release, they embarked on a co-headlining US tour with Breaking Benjamin that would take place between October and November 2015. The tour went on to gross a total of $5.7 million.

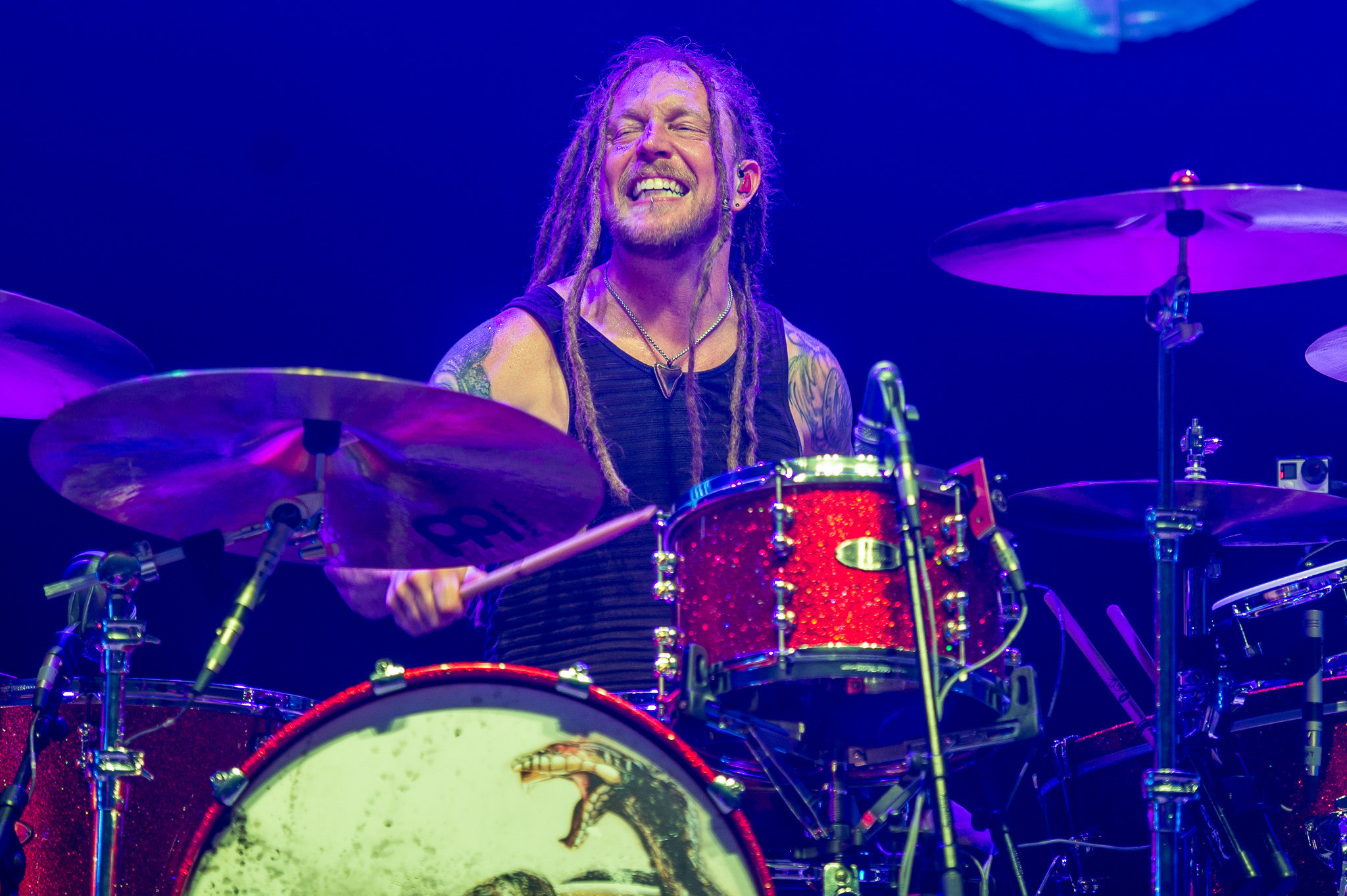
Barry Kerch performing in 2016

The band continued touring in 2016, headlining U.S. dates with The Virginmarys. The group appeared on Jimmy Kimmel Live in April 2016, and, the following month, they performed at several festivals including the Fort Rock Festival and Rock'N Derby. The band also headlined the 2016 version of the Carnival of Madness tour with Halestorm in July and August. Later in 2016, the band went on a fall U.S. arena tour with Sixx AM and Five Finger Death Punch that was extended into December.

=== 2017–2020: Attention Attention ===
In February 2017, Smith announced that they had begun work on a sixth studio album. Bass had been working on writing 22 separate pieces of music over the course of their 2016 touring, separate from the rest of the band, who wanted to just concentrate on touring. Bass had just begun presenting the material to Smith, who, while unsure how much exactly would go into the future album, did say that he was very impressed, and that the material may fit together into a concept album, a first for the band. They joined Iron Maiden on tour in Europe in April and May, and began recording soon after. At the time, the band planned to finish the album in late 2017, release a first single in January 2018, and then release the album in April. In January 2018, Myers announced that the band had finished recording the album, and that Bass was working on finalizing the production and mixing of the album. Myers also described the album's sound as "heavier than Threat to Survival."

On March 7, 2018, the band announced the album's title, Attention Attention, and released its first single, "Devil". "Devil" would eventually reach number 1 on the Active Rock and Mainstream Rock charts. Attention Attention was released on May 4, 2018, and was Shinedown's first album to be produced and mixed entirely by a member of the band (Eric Bass). The album debuted at number 1 on the Top Rock Albums, Hard Rock Albums, and Alternative Albums charts. It was the second time the band had achieved that feat (Amaryllis also topped all three charts). It has thus far peaked at number 5 on the Billboard 200 chart, selling 61,000 units in the process. On April 5, a second song, "The Human Radio" was released as a promotional single, accompanied by a music video.

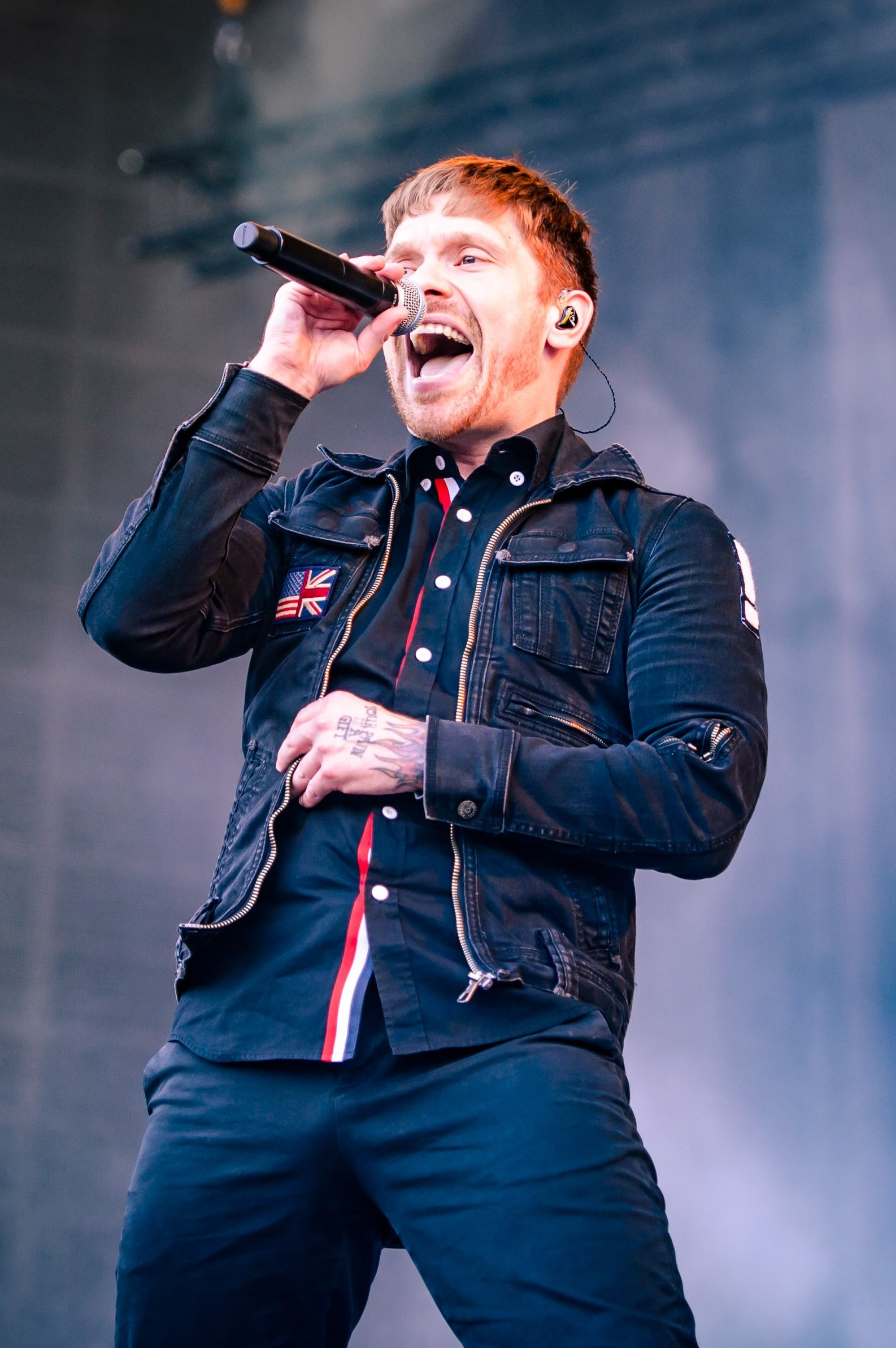
Brent Smith performing in 2018

Shortly after the album's release, the band went on a brief co-headlining tour with Five Finger Death Punch. They also released a 14-minute behind the scenes documentary video about the making of Attention Attention. The band embarked on a summer co-headlining tour with Godsmack that began in July 2018.

In October 2018, Shinedown announced plans to headline a U.S. tour beginning February 20, 2019, in Estero, Florida. Supporting acts for the trek included Papa Roach and Asking Alexandria. The tour concluded on March 20, 2019, in Loveland, CO.

In November 2018, Shinedown regained sole possession of the most top 10 chart placements in the history of Billboard's Rock Airplay chart, with "Get Up" the second single from Attention Attention. The song earned 5.9 million rock radio audience impressions, a boost of 5 percent, in the week ending Nov. 18, according to Nielsen Music. On March 1, 2019, the band released the song "Monsters" as the third single from Attention Attention and was followed by a music video. On July 2, 2019, an animated video for the song was also released. On September 24, 2019, the band released the song "Attention Attention" as the fourth single from Attention Attention and was followed by a music video.

On March 23, 2020, the band released a previously unreleased song recorded for Amaryllis titled "Atlas Falls", to raise money for Direct Relief to provide equipment for frontline workers during the 2020 COVID-19 pandemic. The song was available to download with the purchase of a T-shirt. The band donated $20,000 themselves, and raised over $70,000 in the first 36 hours. On May 22, after raising over $300,000, "Atlas Falls" was officially released to streaming services and digital retailers. On the June 27 tally, "Atlas Falls" became Shinedown's 27th top 10 single on the Mainstream Rock Chart. Only Tom Petty has more, with 28.

On May 26, 2020, the band announced that they had postponed all of their 2020 summer Deep Dive tour due to the COVID-19 pandemic, with many dates being rescheduled.

=== 2021–2024: Planet Zero ===
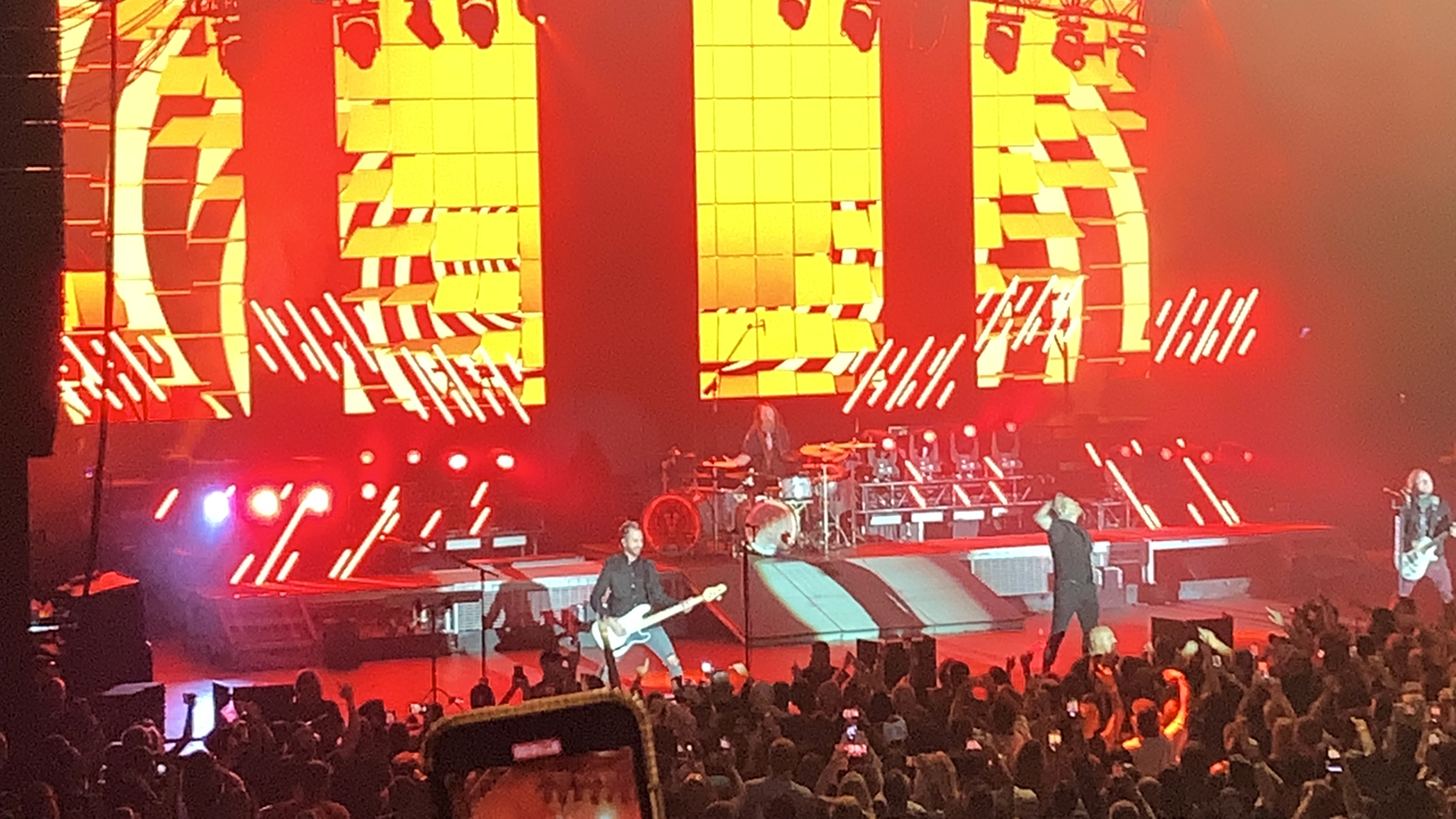
Shinedown performing in St. Augustine, Florida, on October 8, 2021

In February 2021, Smith announced that the band had started working on a seventh studio album, with the goal of releasing it in the second half of 2021. The band released a film for their sixth album, Attention Attention. The film was directed by Bill Yukich and was released on September 3, 2021. On August 28, 2021, Smith announced the band's first single off the upcoming album is expected to be out in January 2022, with the album following a few months later.

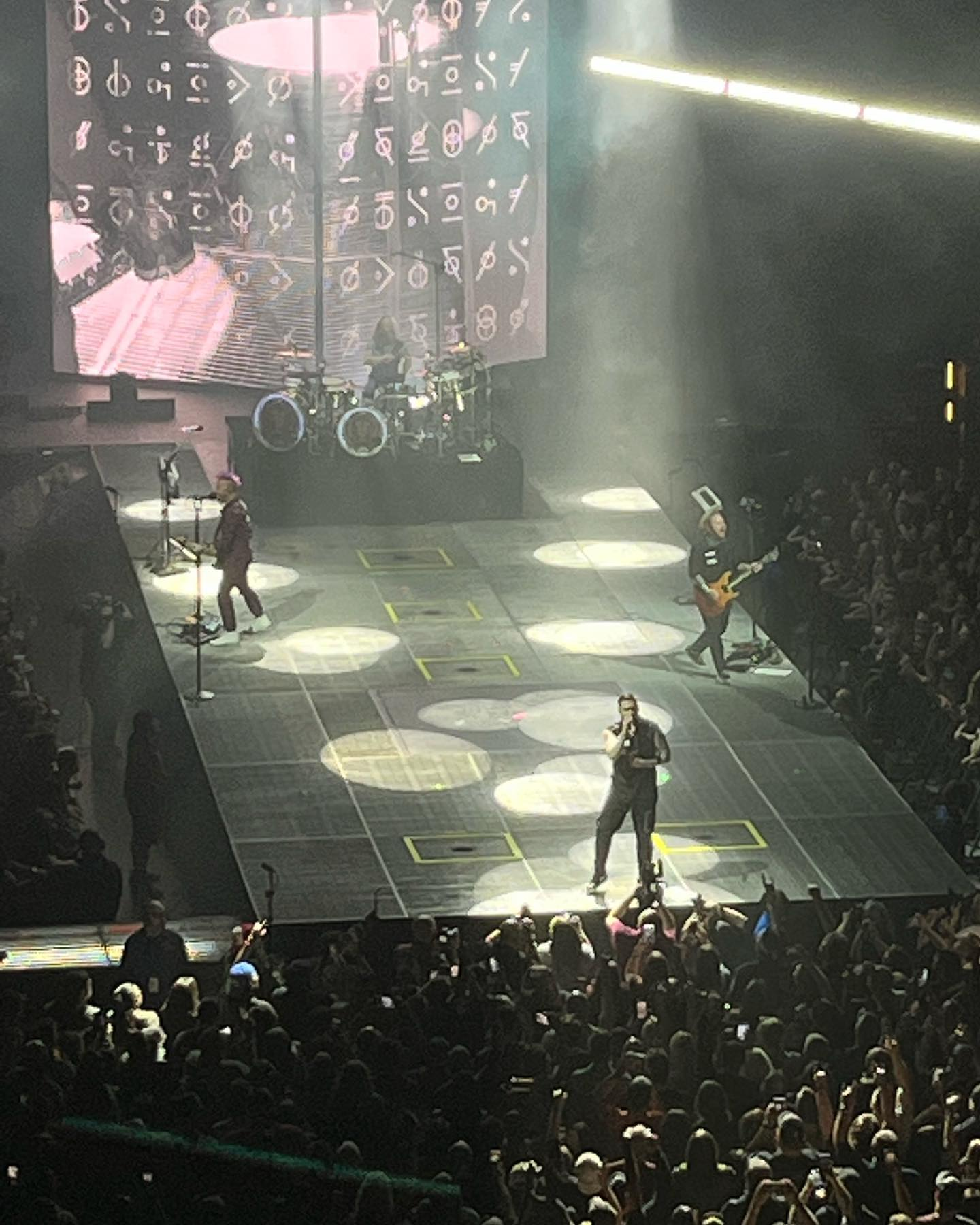
Shinedown performing in Uncasville, Connecticut, on April 16, 2022

On January 26, 2022, the band released the lead single, "Planet Zero", from their seventh studio album of the same name. The album was originally set to be released on April 22, 2022. On March 25, 2022, the band released a second song, "The Saints of Violence and Innuendo". On April 12, 2022, the band announced that the album's release was being pushed back to July 1, 2022. The change was due to a delay in vinyl production, and the band's desire for the fanbase to experience the album simultaneously across formats. In April 2022, the band was inducted into "Mohegan Sun's Walk Of Fame". On June 1, 2022, the band released the second single, "Daylight". After the album's release, "Dead Don't Die" was released as the third single on January 17, 2023, and then "A Symptom of Being Human" as the fourth on February 22, 2023. "A Symptom of Being Human" was the first Shinedown single since their debut to initially not be released to rock radio, instead debuting on Hot Adult Contemporary radio and crossing to rock radio later on. A "Pop Remix" of the song was released on June 23, 2023.

In May 2024 the band launched a signature hot sauce line, with each of the three sauces named after a different song, the first being the "Symptom Chipotle Garlic Sauce" (named after their 2023 single "A Symptom of Being Human"), followed by "Devour Pineapple Jerk Sauce" (after their 2008 single, "Devour"), and "Attention Attention Mango Habanero Sauce" (after their 2019 single, "Attention Attention").

=== 2025–present: Eight ===
In February 2024, Smith announced that the band was working on its eighth studio album. Throughout 2024, both Kerch and Bass shared details about the upcoming album, the process leading to its production, the musical style and the fact that unlike the previous two albums, the next one will not be a concept album.

On January 24, 2025, the band released two singles, "Three Six Five" and "Dance, Kid, Dance" from their upcoming eighth studio album. On July 15, 2025, the album's third single, "Killing Fields", was released. A music video for the song was released on October 28. On November 18, 2025, the band released the single, "Searchlight", along with a music video. The band originally debuted the song live at the Grand Ole Opry earlier in the year.

The band was confirmed to be performing at the 2026 Sonic Temple music festival in Columbus, Ohio.

They were originally scheduled to be performing at the Rock the Country festival led by Kid Rock, but dropped off out of concerns that their appearance would stir division amongst their audience. This decision came after drummer Barry Kerch called rapper Ludacris a "coward" for pulling out of the festival for the same reason.

The eighth album, Eight (stylized as Ei8ht), was officially announced on February 17, 2026, along with a fifth single, "Safe and Sound". The album's sixth single, "Outlaw", was released on April 2. The album released on May 29, 2026 along with a music video for their next single "Young Again".

In June 2026, "Searchlight" became the band's first track to chart at country radio, debuting on the Billboard Country Airplay chart. In July 2026, Bass announced that he was having issues with his mental health and he would not be joining the band for North American tour to focus on the issues. Shortly after, it was announced that two touring members Josh Sturm and Zack Mack would fill in for him.

== Musical style and influences ==
Shinedown's music has been described as hard rock, alternative metal, post-grunge, alternative rock, pop rock, grunge, arena rock, and nu metal, with pop and Southern rock influences. (Note: Hard rock: Alternative metal: Post-grunge: Alternative rock: Pop rock: Grunge: Arena rock: Nu metal: Pop: Southern rock:) In August 2013, Kerch disagreed with more specialized genre ascribed to the band, stating that "We're just a rock 'n' roll band" while conceding that each album did have a markedly different rock sound to them by design. The nu metal label has been applied to the band's earlier work by journalists on occasion, though the band disputes that term as well. The band's first album, Leave a Whisper, largely stayed away from having any guitar solos, something then-guitarist Todd felt was undesirable due to the popularity of nu metal at the time of recording the album, though he felt the band was never particularly part of the genre's movement. With nu metal falling out of popularity by the mid-2000s, they began adding guitar solos more prominently to their music, starting with their next album, Us and Them. Us and Them has also been described as less "grungy" than its predecessor with "more twisted, progressive song structures".

The Sound of Madness went in different musical and lyrical directions as compared to the band's previous two albums. Barry Kerch noted that lineup changes and volatility in the band members' lives produced a darker and angrier sound. The album's lead single, "Devour", is an anti-war anthem, but The Sound of Madness also contains "If You Only Knew", the band's first love ballad. Amaryllis has been noted to have a more positive, "anthemic" bent. Writing for Loudwire, Anne Erickson described the album's sound as "aggressive-yet-cathartic." Their fifth studio album, Threat to Survival, was described as the band's most "pop-oriented" album, with the single "State of My Head" being referred to as "a slick amalgam of electro-pop and vintage alt-rock with a catchy as hell though extremely well-worn chorus." The 2018 follow-up, Attention Attention, is a concept album that begins with the narrator in a "dark, negative place" and gradually emerging from that over the course of the track listing. Both Threat to Survival and Attention Attention have been described as having more of a pop rock sound but have also been described as hard rock.

The band has cited Stone Temple Pilots, Otis Redding, Pink Floyd, and Iron Maiden as influences. Primary songwriter, Brent Smith, has also cited Etta James, Ella Fitzgerald, The Doors, Soundgarden, and Metallica as some of his influences.

== Members ==
Shinedown live at Rock im Park 2022

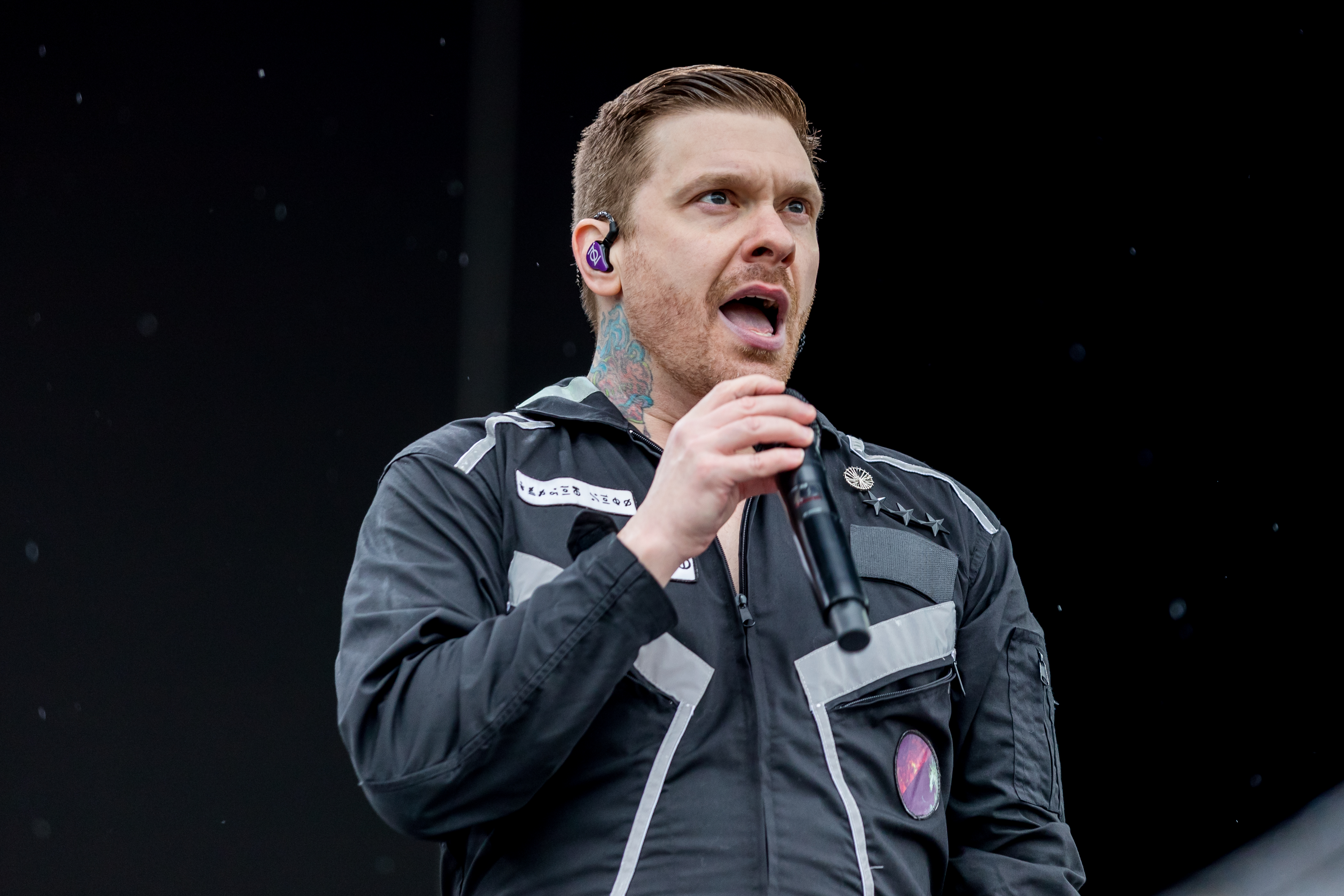
Brent Smith

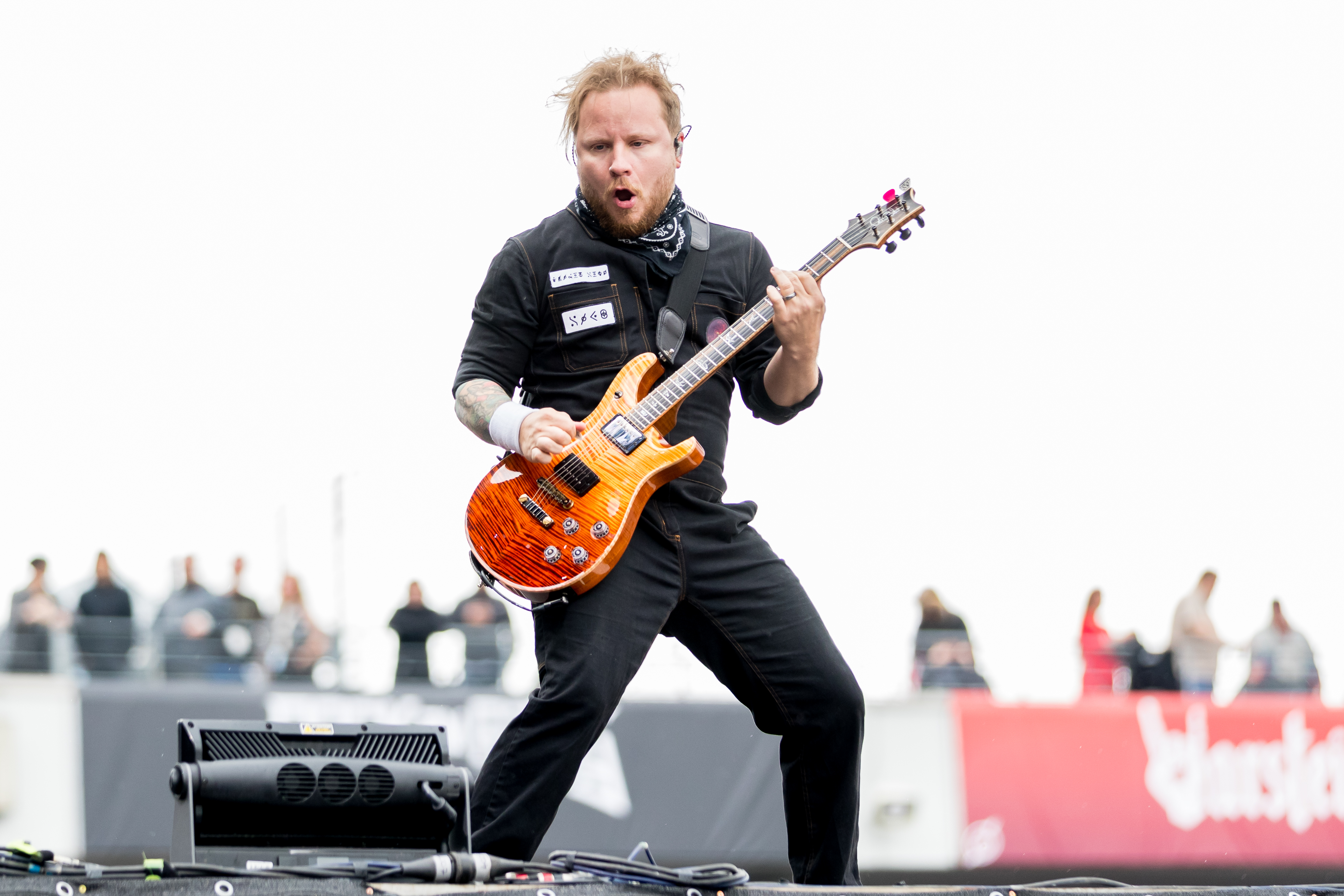
Zach Myers

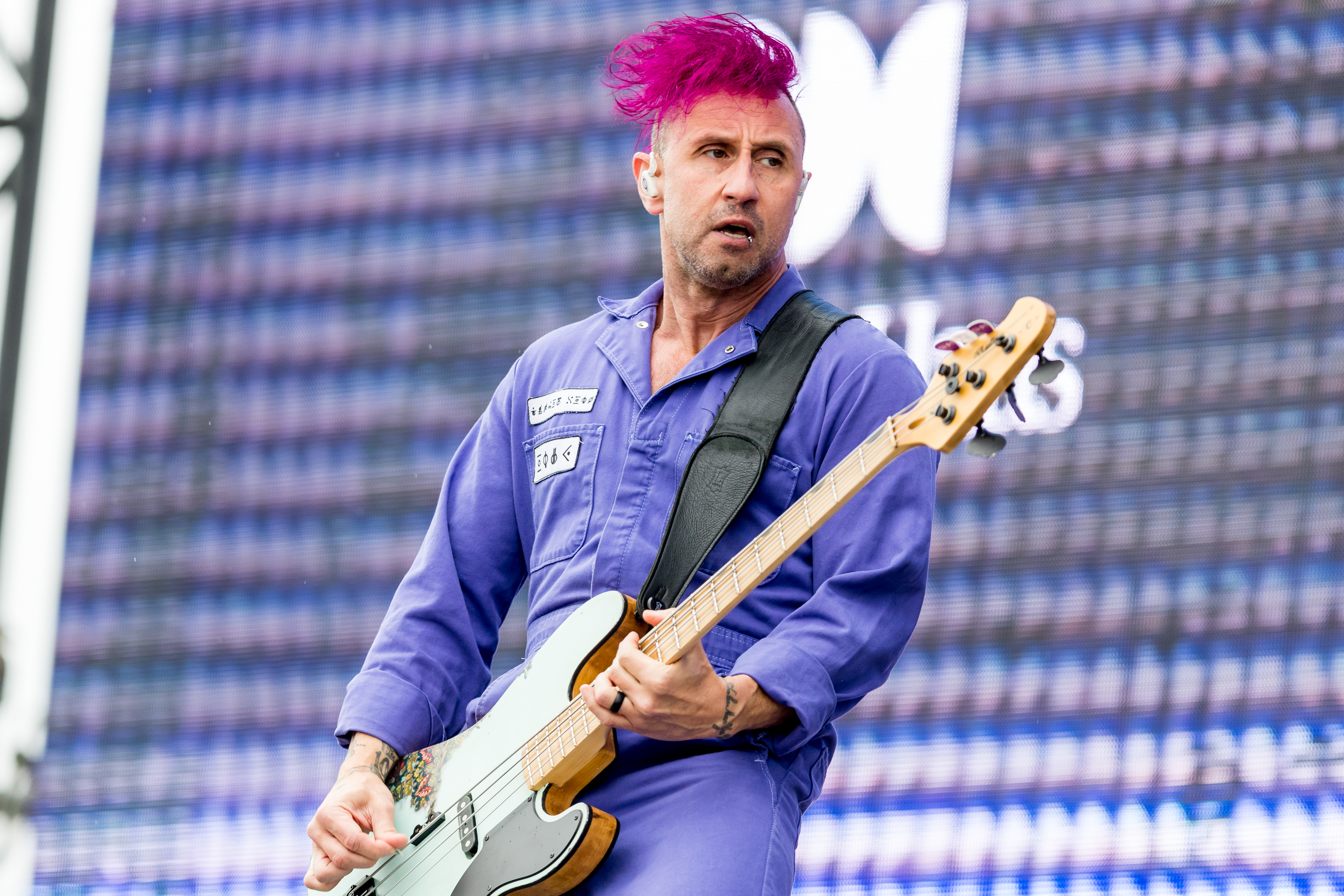
Eric Bass

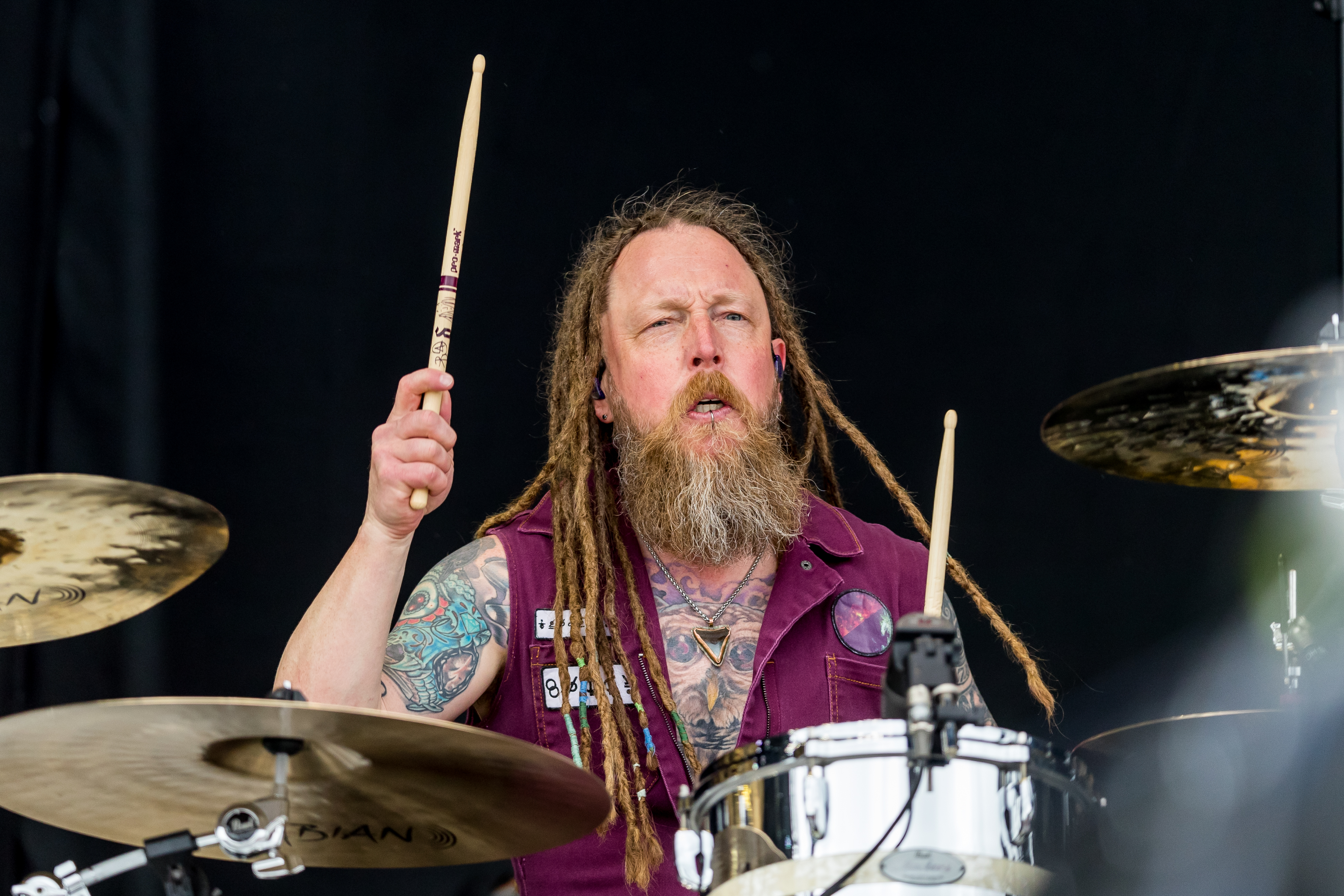
Barry Kerch

Current

- Brent Smith – lead vocals (2001–present)
- Barry Kerch – drums (2001–present)
- Zach Myers – guitar, piano, backing vocals (2008–present; touring 2005–2007), bass (2017–present; touring 2007–2008)
- Eric Bass – bass, piano, backing vocals (2008–present), guitar (2017–present)

Former

- Brad Stewart – bass (2001–2007)
- Jasin Todd – guitar (2001–2007)
- Nick Perri – guitar (2008)

Touring

- Josh Sturm – bass (2026–present; substitute for Eric Bass)
- Zack Mack – guitar, piano (2026–present)

== Discography ==
Studio albums

- Leave a Whisper (2003)
- Us and Them (2005)
- The Sound of Madness (2008)
- Amaryllis (2012)
- Threat to Survival (2015)
- Attention Attention (2018)
- Planet Zero (2022)
- Eight (2026)

== Awards and nominations ==
Kerrang! Awards

Year	Nominee / work	Award	Result
2009	Shinedown	Best International Newcomer	Nominated

Billboard Music Awards

Year	Nominee / work	Award	Result
2006	Shinedown	Modern Rock Artist of the Year	Nominated
2006	Shinedown	Rock Artist of the Year	Nominated

American Music Awards

Year	Nominee / work	Award	Result
2009	Shinedown	Favorite Alternative Artist	Nominated

iHeartRadio Music Awards

Year	Nominee / work	Award	Result
2016	"Cut the Cord"	Rock Song of the Year	Nominated
2017	Shinedown	Rock Artist of the Year	Nominated
2019	Shinedown	Rock Artist of the Year	Nominated
2019	"Devil"	Rock Song of the Year	Nominated
2020	Shinedown	Rock Artist of the Year	Nominated
2020	"Monsters"	Rock Song of the Year	Nominated
2021	Shinedown	Rock Artist of the Year	Nominated
2023	Shinedown	Rock Artist of the Year	Nominated
2023	"Planet Zero"	Rock Song of the Year	Nominated
2024	Shinedown	Rock Artist of the Year	Nominated
2024	"Dead Don't Die"	Rock Song of the Year	Nominated
2025	Shinedown	Rock Artist of the Year	Won
2025	"A Symptom of Being Human"	Rock Song of the Year	Won
2026	Shinedown	Duo/Group of the Year	Nominated
2026	Shinedown	Rock Artist of the Year	Won
2026	"Dance, Kid, Dance"	Rock Song of the Year	Nominated

MTV Video Music Awards

Year	Nominee / work	Award	Result
2022	"Planet Zero"	Best Rock	Nominated
