= Brent Smith =

American singer (born 1978)

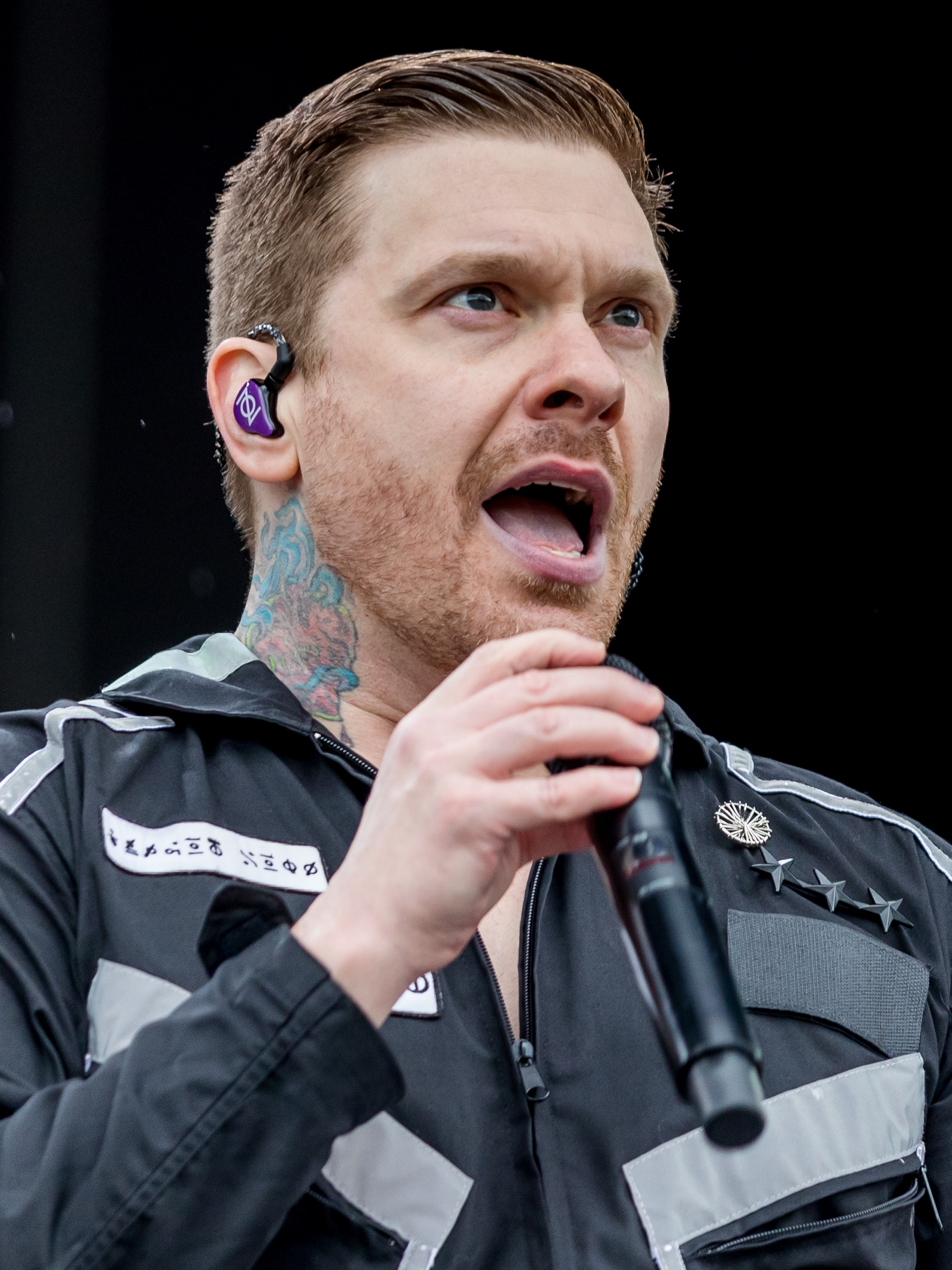
- Smith performing with Shinedown in 2022
- Born: Brently Stephen Smith; January 10, 1978 (age 48); Knoxville, Tennessee, U.S.
- Occupations: Singer; songwriter
- Children: 1
- Musical career
- Genres: Hard rock; post-grunge; alternative metal; alternative rock; pop rock; acoustic
- Instrument: Vocals
- Years active: 2001–present
- Label: Atlantic
- Member of: Shinedown; Smith & Myers
- Website: shinedown.com

Brently Stephen Smith (born January 10, 1978) is an American singer and songwriter best known as the lead vocalist and one of the main songwriters of the rock band Shinedown.

== Early life ==
Brently Stephen Smith was born January 10, 1978, in Knoxville, Tennessee. Interview-based reporting from Noisecreep in 2010 states that Smith was an only child.

== Career ==
Prior to fronting the rock band Shinedown, Smith was the lead singer in a band called Dreve. Eventually, Dreve got signed to Atlantic Records, with Smith and his bandmates traveling to Los Angeles, California, to record with well-known producer Desmond Child. Shortly after returning home to Knoxville, Atlantic dropped the band but retained Smith. Atlantic signed Smith to a developmental contract, with Smith needing to either find another band or lose his record deal. He put together Shinedown shortly after, moving to Jacksonville, Florida to begin working on the project in 2001.

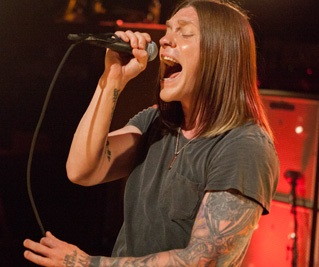
Smith performing with Shinedown in 2012

Brad Stewart, the band's bassist, was the first member Smith recruited, through local Jacksonville music producer Pete Thornton. Smith and Stewart began recording demos together in a small local studio, whose owner recommended they meet with her fiancé, guitarist Jasin Todd, who Smith brought in as the third member. The original lineup was rounded out by drummer Barry Kerch, who was the seventh drummer the band had auditioned for the spot. The four worked together on creating demos, and submitted their work-in-progress material to Atlantic, who approved of the material and green-lighted a full-length album. The band's debut album, Leave a Whisper was released May 27, 2003. The album was eventually certified platinum, indicating sales of over one million copies. In 2010, Smith was featured on the Apocalyptica song, "Not Strong Enough" from the album 7th Symphony. In 2013, Smith was featured on the Halestorm "Here's to Us (Guest Version)". In 2014, Smith collaborated with In This Moment on the song, "Sexual Hallucination", from the album, Black Widow. In 2014, Smith and Zach Myers started an acoustic side project called Smith & Myers. As a duo they have released three EPs: Acoustic Sessions (2014), Volume I (2020), and Volume II (2020). On August 28, 2022, Brent was presented with a key to Knox County at a concert in Knoxville, Tennessee, by former wrestler and current Knox County Mayor Glenn Jacobs. Shinedown has since released seven more studio albums: Us and Them (2005), The Sound of Madness (2008), Amaryllis (2012), Threat to Survival (2015), Attention Attention (2018), Planet Zero (2022), and Eight (2026). On August 28, 2022, Smith was presented with a key to Knox County at a concert in Knoxville, Tennessee, by former wrestler and current Knox County Mayor Glenn Jacobs. In 2014, Smith and Zach Myers started an acoustic side project called Smith & Myers.

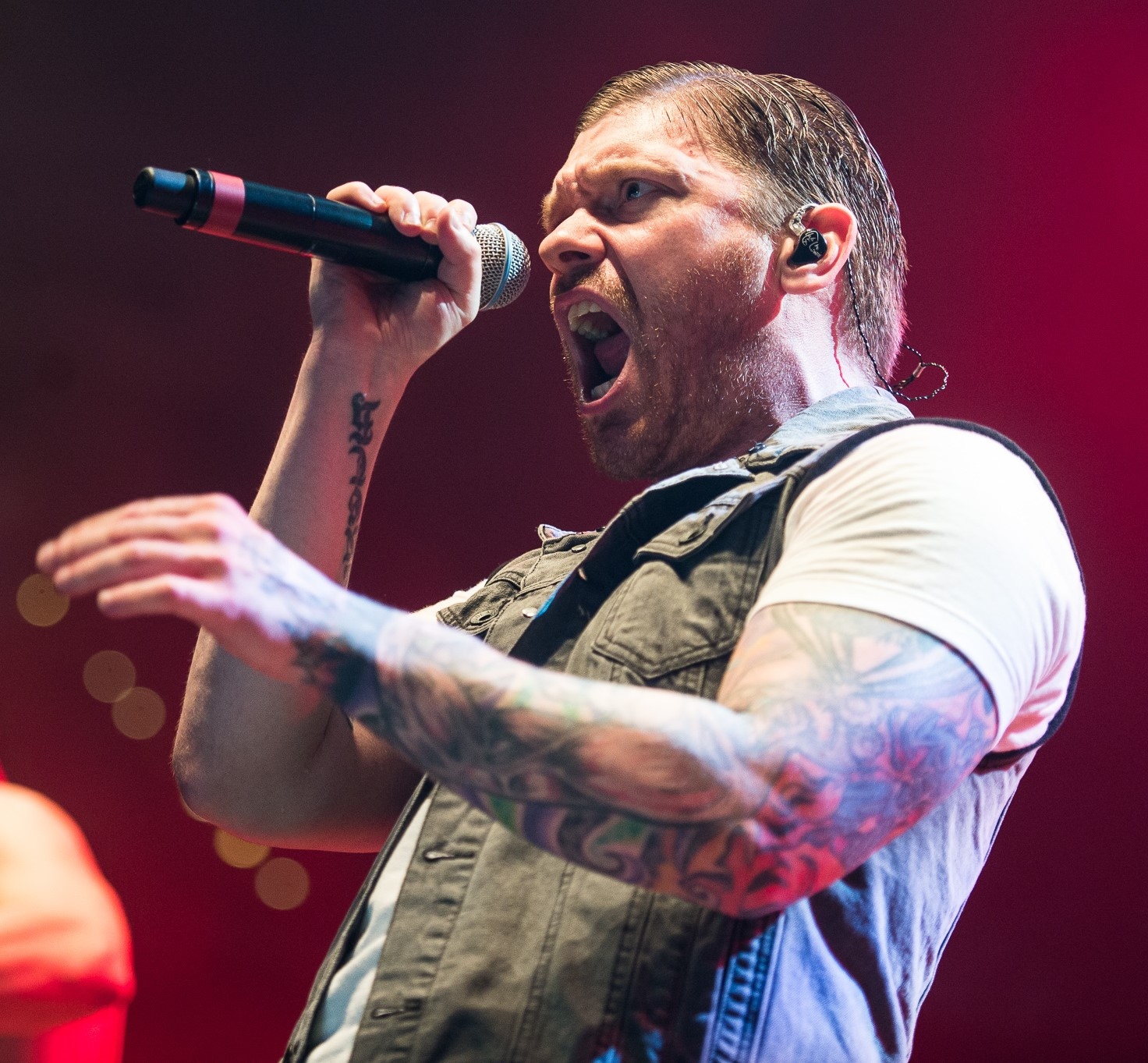
Smith performing with Shinedown in 2016

== Personal life ==
In 2008, Smith had a son with his then fiancée, Ashley. Smith struggled with drugs and alcohol managing his weight. Following an intervention from his then-girlfriend, "Theresa", Smith states, in interview, that he quit drinking, and lost weight through a healthier diet and exercise. Smith says that his former girlfriend, his son, and his fans inspired him to lose weight and become healthier.

== Discography ==
=== Shinedown ===
- Leave a Whisper (2003)
- Us and Them (2005)
- The Sound of Madness (2008)
- Amaryllis (2012)
- Threat to Survival (2015)
- Attention Attention (2018)
- Planet Zero (2022)
- Eight (2026)

=== Smith & Myers ===
- Acoustic Sessions (2014)
- Volume I (2020)
- Volume II (2020)

=== Guest appearances ===
Artist	Song	Album	Year	Ref.
Daughtry	"There and Back Again" (Note: (Smith is credited as a writer on this song.))	Daughtry	2006	
Theory of a Deadman	"So Happy (feat. Brent Smith)"	Scars & Souvenirs	2008	
Saliva	"Don't Question My Heart (feat. Brent Smith)"	WWE The Music, Vol. 8	2008	
Saliva	"My Own Worst Enemy (feat. Brent Smith)"	Cinco Diablo	2008	
Apocalyptica	"Not Strong Enough (feat. Brent Smith)"	7th Symphony	2010	
Halestorm	"Here's to Us (Guest Version)" (Note: (feat. Brent Smith, Slash, Wolfgang Van Halen, Myles Kennedy, James Michael, Tyler Connolly, David Draiman, and Maria Brink)")	The Strange Case Of... (Reissue Version)	2013	
In This Moment	"Sexual Hallucination (feat. Brent Smith)"	Black Widow	2014	
Multiple Artists	"Mustang Sally"	Muscle Shoals: Small Town, Big Sound	2018	
Lynyrd Skynyrd	"Simple Man (feat. Brent Smith) (live)"	Celebrating 50 Years - Live at the Ryman	2025	
