= 2012 in rock music =

This article summarizes the events related to rock music for the year of 2012.

== Notable events ==
=== January ===
- A number of late 2011 released rock albums stay in the top 10 of the US all-format Billboard 200 albums chart in January, including The Black Keys's El Camino, Nickelback's Here and Now, and Coldplay's Mylo Xyloto.
- Snow Patrol releases their sixth studio album, Fallen Empires. It debuts on the Billboard 200 at number 5, selling 31,000 copies. It's the band's highest charting album on the chart, though it is behind Eyes Open in highest sales week and sells far less than Eyes Open or Final Straw cumulatively.
- Lamb of God releases their seventh studio album, Resolution. It debuts at number 3 on the Billboard 200 chart, selling 52,000 copies.
- Chevelle's single "Face to the Floor" tops the US Billboard Mainstream Rock Songs chart, and stays there for seven weeks in a row. The song was an angry response to the Bernie Madoff investment scandal.

=== February ===
- Shinedown's single "Bully" tops the Billboard Mainstream Rock Songs chart, and stays there for 12 consecutive weeks. It is also a cross-over success, charting on the US all-format Billboard Hot 100 songs chart, peaking at 94, a rarity for a hard rock song in the 2010s.
- Van Halen releases their twelfth studio album, A Different Kind of Truth, their first studio album in 14 years. It debuts at number 2 on the Billboard 200 chart, selling 187,000 copies. It is the band's fourteenth album in a row to debut in the top 10 of the chart.
- The Fray releases their third studio album, Scars & Stories. It debuts at number 4 on the Billboard 200, selling 87,000 copies.

=== March ===
- Bruce Springsteen releases his seventeenth studio album, Wrecking Ball. It tops the Billboard 200 chart, selling 196,000 copies in its opening week. It is his tenth studio album to top the chart. It tops over 10 other national all-format album charts as well.
- The Shins release their fourth studio album, Port of Morrow, their first album in five years, and their first with an entirely new lineup outside of band frontman James Mercer. It debuts at number 3 on the Billboard 200 chart.

=== April ===
- Shinedown releases their fourth studio album, Amaryllis. It debuts at number 4 on the Billboard 200 chart, selling 106,000 copies. The first week sales are over double the debut of their prior album, 50,000 for The Sound of Madness in 2008, although Amaryllis only goes on to be certified Gold by the RIAA, while The Sound of Madness has been certified double platinum to date.
- The Used releases their fifth studio album, Vulnerable. It debuts at number 8 on the Billboard 200, selling 32,000 copies.
- Silversun Pickups release their third studio album, Neck of the Woods. It debuts at number 6 on the Billboard 200, selling 41,000 copies.
- Jack White releases his first solo album, Blunderbuss. It tops the Billboard 200 chart, selling 138,000 copies. It remains in the chart's top 10 in its second week as well.

=== May ===
- Soundgarden single "Live to Rise" tops the Billboard Mainstream Rock Songs chart, and stays there for six straight weeks. The song is the band's first newly written song in 15 years, since the band's first breakup in 1997.
- Slash, billed as Slash feat. Myles Kennedy & The Conspirators, releases the studio album Apocalyptic Love, the first of three collaborations between Slash and Myles Kennedy of Alterbridge. It debuts at number 4 on the Billboard 200, selling 38,000 copies.
- Avengers Assemble (Music from and Inspired by the Motion Picture), the soundtrack to the 2012 Avengers film, charts at number 11 on the Billboard 200. The album is primarily contributed from rock bands, many of which released new, non-album, songs, including Soundgarden, Shinedown, and Papa Roach.
- Tenacious D releases their third studio album, Rize of the Fenix. It debuted at number 4 on the Billboard 200 chart, selling 49,000 copies in its opening week.

=== June ===
- Linkin Park releases their fifth studio album, Living Things. It tops the Billboard 200 chart, selling 223,000 copies. It is the highest debuting hard rock album in the US until over a year later when Avenged Sevenfold releases Hail to the King. It is the band's fifth album to top the chart. The album holds on to number 5 in its second week of release, and is eventually certified platinum by the RIAA as well.
- Linkin Park's single "Burn It Down" tops the Billboard Mainstream Rock Songs chart. While its only on top of the chart for a week, the song goes on to be certified double platinum by the RIAA, indicating two million copies sold.
- Volbeat's single "Still Counting" tops the Billboard Mainstream Rock Songs chart for two weeks.
- Neil Young releases his thirty first studio album, Americana, his first collaboration with the Crazy Horse backing band since 2003. It is his highest debuting album since his 1972 release of Harvest Moon.
- Rush releases their nineteenth and final album prior to breaking up after 40 years of activity. The album debuts at number 2 on the Billboard 200, selling 103,000 copies. It also tops the Canadian Albums Chart.
- The Smashing Pumpkins release their eighth studio album, Oceania. The album debuts at number 4 on the Billboard 200 chart, selling 54,000 copies in its first week, and over 135,000 copies by early 2014.

=== July ===
- Slash feat. Myles Kennedy & The Conspirators single "You're a Lie" tops the Billboard Mainstream Rock Songs chart for two weeks, and tops the Canadian Active Rock chart for 5 weeks.
- The Gaslight Anthem releases their fourth studio album, Handwritten. It debuts at number 3 on the Billboard 200 chart, selling 40,000 copies.

=== August ===
- Shinedown's single "Unity" tops the Billboard Mainstream Rock Songs chart for 4 weeks - the entire month of August. By the end of the month, between it and previous single "Bully", the band spends 16 weeks atop of the chart.
- Yellowcard releases their eighth studio album, Southern Air. It debuts at number 10 on the Billboard 200, selling 23,000 copies.

=== September ===
- Matchbox Twenty releases their fourth studio album, North, their first studio album in a decade. It tops the Billboard 200 chart, selling 95,000 copies in its opening week. Despite the band's popularity in the late 1990s and early 2000s, its their first to top the chart, and is eventually certified gold by the RIAA (though this is less than their prior three albums, which all went multi-platinum.)
- Dave Matthews Band releases their eighth studio album, Away from the World. It tops the Billboard 200 chart, selling 223,000 copies. It is their sixth straight album to top the chart.
- Five Finger Death Punch's single "Coming Down" tops the Billboard Mainstream Rock Songs chart for two nonconsecutive weeks during the month.
- Three Days Grace single "Chalk Outline" tops the Billboard Mainstream Rock Songs chart for 13 weeks in a row, in a streak that runs from September to December, the longest period for the entire year.

=== October ===
- Muse releases their sixth studio album, The 2nd Law. It debuts at number 2 on the Billboard 200 chart, selling 101,000 copies.
- All Time Low releases their fifth studio album, Don't Panic. It debuts at number 5, selling 49,000 copies.
- Coheed and Cambria releases their sixth studio album, The Afterman: Ascension. It debuts at number 5, selling 48,000 copies.

=== December ===
- Soundgarden's single "Been Away Too Long" tops the Billboard Mainstream Rock Songs chart for the last 2 weeks of the year, as part of a 7 week stay at the top that runs into February 2013.

=== Year end ===
- Shinedown's Bully tops the Billboard Mainstream Rock Songs year-end chart, followed by Chevelle's "Face to the Floor" and "Hats Off to the Bull", despite the latter never topping the chart, peaking at number 2.
- Both Jack White and The Black Keys are nominated for the Grammy Award for Record of the Year and Grammy Award for Best Rock Album. Neither win Record of the Year, but The Black Keys win Best Rock Album. White additionally performs live at the ceremony.

== Deaths ==
- Dennis Flemion - member of The Frogs, dies at the age of 57 due to drowning. While never finding breakout success in his own band, many 1990s alternative rock bands, such as Nirvana, Pearl Jam, and Smashing Pumpkins express approval of his music, the latter two recording minor b-sides with him, and even touring for a brief stint with the Smashing Pumpkins.

== Band breakups ==
- Jet (reformed for touring in 2016).
