= List of Billboard Mainstream Rock number-one songs of the 1990s =

When the 1990s began, Billboard magazine published two rock charts, Album Rock Tracks and Modern Rock Tracks, and the two formats played a decidedly different set of artists with a few exceptions. Crossover between the two began to increase, however, with the rise and emergence of alternative rock such as grunge and a heavier sound that appealed to both genres. Mainstays on the Album Rock chart, such as Def Leppard, Tom Petty and the Heartbreakers, and Van Halen were being mixed in with alternative bands such as Pearl Jam, Red Hot Chili Peppers, and Stone Temple Pilots, to name a few, by the middle part of the decade. The progressive rock of Rush's "Show Don't Tell", the final song to top the chart in the 1980s, had evolved into the post-grunge sound of Creed's "Higher" by the end of the 1990s. Despite the evolution, Van Halen still managed to top the chart more than any other artist during the 1990s with eight number-one songs.

The 1990s brought a new methodology of measuring airplay on the Billboard charts, and its impact was shown in the Album Rock Tracks chart. Songs stayed on the chart for a long time and fewer songs made it on the chart. Ten songs had runs at number one of ten weeks or longer during the 1990s, with the longest coming from "Touch, Peel and Stand" by Days of the New at 16 weeks. ("Higher" by Creed spent 17 weeks at the top of the chart but its last couple of weeks ran into the year 2000).

By 1996, rock radio stations had become more song-driven rather than album-driven. In response, Billboard changed the name of its Album Rock Tracks chart to Mainstream Rock Tracks in April of that year.

== Number ones of the 1990s ==
† – Number-one song of the year (Note: The Mainstream Rock Tracks year-end number-one song of 1996 was "Counting Blue Cars" by Dishwalla, while the number-one song of 1999 was "One" by Creed.)

Issue date	Song	Artist(s)	Weeks at number one (Note: Weeks spent at number one in this decade)	Ref.
1990
January 6	"Show Don't Tell"	Rush	1	
January 13	"Downtown Train"	Rod Stewart	2	
January 27	"Bad Love"	Eric Clapton	3	
February 17	"Black Velvet"	Alannah Myles	1	
February 24	"What It Takes"†	Aerosmith	1	
March 3	"Black Velvet"	Alannah Myles	1	
March 10	"Almost Hear You Sigh"	The Rolling Stones	1	
March 17	"Blue Sky Mine"	Midnight Oil	1	
March 24	"Hurting Kind"	Robert Plant	6	
May 5	"Coming of Age"	Damn Yankees	1	
May 12	"Texas Twister"	Little Feat	1	
May 19	"Doubleback"	ZZ Top	5	
June 23	"Cradle of Love"	Billy Idol	2	
July 7	"Holy Water"	Bad Company	2	
July 21	"Across the River"	Bruce Hornsby and the Range	1	
July 28	"The Other Side"	Aerosmith	2	
August 11	"Good Clean Fun"	Allman Brothers Band	1	
August 18	"Brickyard Road"	Johnny Van Zant	3	
September 8	"Blaze of Glory"	Jon Bon Jovi	1	
September 15	"Suicide Blonde"	INXS	4	
October 13	"Concrete and Steel"	ZZ Top	4	
November 10	"Hard to Handle"	The Black Crowes	2	
November 24	"One and Only Man"	Steve Winwood	2	
December 8	"My Head's in Mississippi"	ZZ Top	6	
1991
January 19	"All This Time"	Sting	7	
March 9	"She Talks to Angels"	The Black Crowes	1	
March 16	"Highwire"	The Rolling Stones	3	
April 6	"Silent Lucidity"†	Queensrÿche	1	
April 13	"Losing My Religion"	R.E.M.	3	
May 4	"Lift Me Up"	Yes	6	
June 15	"Poundcake"	Van Halen	2	
June 29	"Learning to Fly"	Tom Petty and the Heartbreakers	6	
August 10	"Runaround"	Van Halen	4	
September 7	"Out in the Cold"	Tom Petty and the Heartbreakers	2	
September 21	"Dreamline"	Rush	4	
October 19	"Get a Leg Up"	John Mellencamp	1	
October 26	"Top of the World"	Van Halen	3	
November 16	"Get a Leg Up"	John Mellencamp	1	
November 23	"Top of the World"	Van Halen	1	
November 30	"Get a Leg Up"	John Mellencamp	1	
December 7	"Heavy Fuel"	Dire Straits	1	
December 14	"Mysterious Ways"† (1992)	U2	12	
1992
March 7	"Again Tonight"	John Mellencamp	2	
March 21	"Human Touch"	Bruce Springsteen	3	
April 11	"Let's Get Rocked"	Def Leppard	1	
April 18	"One"	U2	2	
May 2	"Remedy"	The Black Crowes	11	
July 18	"Sting Me"	The Black Crowes	2	
August 1	"Even Better Than the Real Thing"	U2	3	
August 22	"Thorn in My Pride"	The Black Crowes	4	
September 19	"How About That"	Bad Company	6	
October 31	"Digging in the Dirt"	Peter Gabriel	1	
November 7	"Rest in Peace"	Extreme	2	
November 21	"Keep the Faith"	Bon Jovi	1	
November 28	"Hotel Illness"	The Black Crowes	6	
1993
January 9	"Stand Up (Kick Love into Motion)"	Def Leppard	5	
February 13	"Don't Tear Me Up"	Mick Jagger	1	
February 20	"Won't Get Fooled Again"	Van Halen	1	
February 27	"Pride and Joy"	Coverdale and Page	6	
April 10	"Livin' on the Edge"	Aerosmith	9	
June 12	"Are You Gonna Go My Way"	Lenny Kravitz	2	
June 26	"Plush"†	Stone Temple Pilots	1	
July 3	"Big Gun"	AC/DC	2	
July 17	"Cryin'"	Aerosmith	6	
August 28	"What If I Came Knocking"	John Mellencamp	2	
September 11	"Peace Pipe"	Cry of Love	4	
October 9	"No Rain"	Blind Melon	2	
October 23	"Stick It Out"	Rush	4	
November 20	"Mary Jane's Last Dance"	Tom Petty and the Heartbreakers	2	
December 4	"Daughter"	Pearl Jam	8	
1994
January 29	"Pincushion"	ZZ Top	4	
February 26	"Deuces Are Wild"	Aerosmith	4	
March 26	"No Excuses"	Alice in Chains	2	
April 9	"Keep Talking"	Pink Floyd	6	
May 21	"Shine"†	Collective Soul	8	
July 16	"Black Hole Sun"	Soundgarden	7	
September 3	"Vasoline"	Stone Temple Pilots	2	
September 17	"Interstate Love Song"	Stone Temple Pilots	15	
December 31	"You Don't Know How It Feels"	Tom Petty	1	
1995
January 7	"Better Man"	Pearl Jam	2	
January 21	"Don't Tell Me (What Love Can Do)"	Van Halen	3	
February 11	"Better Man"	Pearl Jam	6	
March 25	"Lightning Crashes"	Live	10	
June 3	"December"†	Collective Soul	9	
August 5	"Hold Me, Thrill Me, Kiss Me, Kill Me"	U2	1	
August 12	"And Fools Shine On"	Brother Cane	6	
September 23	"Tomorrow"	Silverchair	3	
October 14	"Hard as a Rock"	AC/DC	3	
November 4	"Name"	Goo Goo Dolls	5	
December 9	"My Friends"	Red Hot Chili Peppers	4	
1996
January 6	"Cumbersome"	Seven Mary Three	4	
February 3	"The World I Know"	Collective Soul	4	
March 2	"1979"	The Smashing Pumpkins	2	
March 16	"Santa Monica"	Everclear	3	
April 6	"In the Meantime"	Spacehog	4	
May 4	"Big Bang Baby"	Stone Temple Pilots	1	
May 11	"Where the River Flows"	Collective Soul	2	
May 25	"Humans Being"	Van Halen	2	
June 8	"Until It Sleeps"	Metallica	7	
July 27	"Trippin' on a Hole in a Paper Heart"	Stone Temple Pilots	1	
August 3	"Until It Sleeps"	Metallica	1	
August 10	"Trippin' on a Hole in a Paper Heart"	Stone Temple Pilots	3	
August 31	"Burden in My Hand"	Soundgarden	5	
October 5	"Test for Echo"	Rush	3	
October 26	"Me Wise Magic"	Van Halen	6	
December 7	"Hero of the Day"	Metallica	3	
December 28	"Blow Up the Outside World"	Soundgarden	3	
1997
January 18	"Lady Picture Show"	Stone Temple Pilots	1	
January 25	"Blow Up the Outside World"	Soundgarden	1	
February 1	"One Headlight"	The Wallflowers	5	
March 8	"Falling in Love (Is Hard on the Knees)"	Aerosmith	5	
April 12	"Precious Declaration"	Collective Soul	4	
May 10	"Gone Away"	The Offspring	2	
May 24	"Little White Lie"	Sammy Hagar	5	
June 28	"If You Could Only See"†	Tonic	5	
August 2	"Listen"	Collective Soul	5	
September 6	"Pink"	Aerosmith	4	
October 4	"Touch, Peel and Stand"	Days of the New	16	
1998
January 24	"Given to Fly"	Pearl Jam	6	
March 7	"Without You"	Van Halen	6	
April 18	"Blue on Black"†	Kenny Wayne Shepherd Band	3	
May 9	"Most High"	Jimmy Page & Robert Plant	2	
May 23	"Blue on Black"†	Kenny Wayne Shepherd Band	2	
June 6	"I Lie in the Bed I Make"	Brother Cane	4	
July 4	"Blue on Black"†	Kenny Wayne Shepherd Band	1	
July 11	"The Down Town"	Days of the New	10	
September 19	"What's This Life For"	Creed	6	
October 31	"Psycho Circus"	Kiss	1	
November 7	"Fly Away"	Lenny Kravitz	3	
November 28	"Turn the Page"	Metallica	11	
1999
February 13	"What It's Like"	Everlast	1	
February 20	"Heavy"	Collective Soul	15	
June 5	"Lit Up"	Buckcherry	3	
June 26	"Promises"	Def Leppard	3	
July 17	"Scar Tissue"	Red Hot Chili Peppers	10	
September 25	"Higher"	Creed	14	
