= Outpost =

Outpost or outposts may refer to:

== Places ==
- Outpost (military), a detachment of troops stationed at a distance from the main force or formation, usually at a station in a remote or sparsely populated location
- Border outpost, an outpost maintained by a sovereign state on its border, usually one of a series placed at regular intervals, to watch over and safeguard its border with a neighboring state
- Human outpost, an artificially-created, controlled human habitat located in an environment inhospitable for humans, such as the ocean floor, the Antarctic, in space, or on another planet
- Outpost Estates, Los Angeles, California, a canyon neighborhood
- Outpost Islands, Nunavut, Canada
- Israeli outpost, a settlement built on land that was not legally purchased and was not given a building permit by the State of Israel

== Entertainment ==
- The Outpost, a 1909 play written by James Francis Jewell Archibald
- Outpost (board game), from TimJim games
- Outpost (chess), a strategic element in chess
- Outpost Gallifrey, a Doctor Who fan website
- The Outpost (Resnick novel), a 2001 science fiction novel by Mike Resnick
- The Outpost (Prus novel), by Bolesław Prus
- Outpost Recordings, an American record label
- The Outpost: An Untold Story of American Valor, a book by Jake Tapper

=== Television ===
- The Outpost (TV series), a 2018 fantasy TV series
- "The Outpost" is Episode 23 of Freeform's 2018 drama show Siren
- "The Outpost" (Star Wars: The Bad Batch)

=== Music ===
- Outpost (The Samples album), 1996
- Outpost (Robert Rich and Ian Boddy album), 2002
- Outpost (Freddie Hubbard album), 1981
- Outpost, a 2014 album by Buckethead
- The Outpost (opera), a 1900 short opera by Hamilton Clarke, played as a companion piece for The Pirates of Penzance

=== Films ===
- Outpost (1944 film), 1944 animated film
- Outpost (1959 film), an Australian television play
- Outpost (2008 film), a 2008 horror film directed by Steve Barker
- Outpost (2009 film), one of Neil Marshall's unrealized films
- Outpost (2022 film), an American horror film
- The Outpost (1995 film), a Hungarian film
- The Outpost, another name for the 1995 film Mind Ripper
- The Outpost (2019 film), a 2019 war drama film based on the book The Outpost: An Untold Story of American Valor by Jake Tapper, about the Battle of Kamdesh in the war in Afghanistan
- The Blackout (2019 film), a 2019 Russian film, whose original title means 'Outpost'

=== Video games ===
- Outpost (1981 video game) for the Apple II
- Outpost (1994 video game) published by Sierra On-Line
- Outpost 2 (1997)
- Outpost Kaloki X, a city-building video game for the Xbox 360

== Other uses ==
- Cyberian Outpost, an online vendor of discount computerware
- Outpost Building, a historic building in Hollywood, California
- Outpost Magazine, a Canadian adventure-travel publication
- Lunar outpost (NASA), a planned, Moon-based inhabited facility
- Outpost Firewall Pro, a software package
- Outpost for Hope, a missing persons website
- Outpost Harry, a remote Korean War military base
- Outpost Island Mine, a gold mine in Canada
- Outpost Snipe, a remote World War II military located Egypt
- Outpost Societies, secret, early 20th century Istanbul societal organizations
- Outposts of tyranny, a term used in 2005 to characterize some governments
- Outpost.com, a name formerly used by Fry's Electronics
- Outposts: Journeys to the Surviving Relics of the British Empire, a 1985 travel book by Simon Winchester
- AWS Outposts, Amazon Web Services infrastructure and services on premises for a consistent hybrid experience

== See also ==
- The Last Outpost (disambiguation)
- Southern Outpost, a record label
