= Days of the New (2001 album) =

Studio album by Days of the New
- Released: September 25, 2001
- Recorded: February–July 2000, summer 2001
- Genre: Post-grunge; alternative rock; acoustic rock
- Length: 56:58
- Label: Outpost; Geffen
- Producer: Ron Aniello; Travis Meeks; Bill Klatt

Days of the New chronology
Days of the New (1999)	Days of the New (2001)

Singles from Days of the New
- 1. "Hang On to This" Released: August 20, 2001; 2. "Die Born" Released: 2002

Days of the New (also known as the Red album or Days of the New III) is the self-titled third and final studio album by American alternative rock band Days of the New. It was released in 2001 and was originally scheduled for late 2000, but Interscope enlisted Ron Aniello to help the band re-record and remix several songs for the record. The songs "Hang On to This," "Die Born," and "Once Again" were also added during this process. Reinforcing the Days of the New album color theme, the CD case to Red is translucent red. This is their only album with a "Parental Advisory" label. Yet, there is little strong language or themes in the lyrics.

== Overview ==
In February 2000, Meeks returned to the studio with a new band. This album incorporated aspects of the previous two; much of the energy from the first album had returned, combined with orchestral interludes similar to the second album. Red also continues the upbeat vibe as emphasized on Green with more emphasis on electric guitar, namely in the opening track "Hang On to This". The album encompasses several tracks written in 2001 as well as some of Meeks' earliest compositions, such as "Words" and "Fighting With Clay."

The original version of the album was completed in 2000. At the record label's request, the album was retooled with producer Ron Aniello enlisted to remix tracks and record several new songs. During the 2001 recording sessions, Meeks' cocaine use escalated. After the album's release that September, he also started using methamphetamine and lost an extreme amount of weight. The tour for the album became chaotic as a result of his use of both drugs.

== Reception ==
Professional ratings
Review scores
Source	Rating
AllMusic	2/5 stars
The Encyclopedia of Popular Music	3/5 stars
The Philadelphia Inquirer	3/4 stars
The Press of Atlantic City	2/4 stars
The Winnipeg Sun	2.5/5 stars
The Wichita Eagle	3/4 stars

The first single, "Hang On to This," charted fairly well and was the most added song on rock radio the week it was released. However, the album was released two weeks after the 9/11 attacks and, with very little promotion, only sold 80,000 copies. The band maintained a profile touring with the likes of Creed and 3 Doors Down.

The songs "Dirty Road", "Hang On to This", and "Die Born" were included on Classic Rock History's list of "Top 10 Days Of The New Songs" at nos. 10, 7, and 5, respectively.

== Track listing ==
All tracks are written by Travis Meeks, except where noted.

No.	Title	Writer(s)	Length
1.	"Hang On to This"		4:11
2.	"Fighting w/ Clay"	Jesse Vest, Matt Taul	2:52
3.	"Days in Our Life"		3:42
4.	"Die Born"		3:56
5.	"Best of Life"		5:33
6.	"Dirty Road"		4:43
7.	"Where Are You?"		3:33
8.	"Never Drown"		5:05
9.	"Words"		3:42
10.	"Once Again"		3:39
11.	"Giving In"		5:44
12.	"Dancing with the Wind" (Track ends at 6:19; includes untitled hidden track)		10:09

=== Original track listing ===
No.	Title	Writer(s)	Length
1.	"Words"		3:42
2.	"Where Are You?" (alternate demo)		3:34
3.	"Fighting w/ Clay"	Vest, Taul	3:42
4.	"Giving In"		3:56
5.	"Days in Our Life" (alternate demo)		3:52
6.	"Best of Life" (alternate demo)		3:53
7.	"Never Drown" (alternate demo)		5:31
8.	"Place with the Sky"		6:05
9.	"Dirty Road" (alternate demo)		6:39
10.	"Dancing with the Wind"		6:19
11.	"Angry Light"		6:32
12.	"Champagne" (includes untitled hidden track)		7:04

- On digital versions of the album, the untitled hidden track is a separate song on track 13.

== Outtakes ==
- "Surface Skimming"
- "Choke Hold" – 5:01

== Personnel ==
Days of the New

- Travis Meeks – lead vocals, guitar
- Mike Huettig – bass
- Ray Rizzo – drums, percussion

Additional

- Sam Anderson – choir conduction
- Roy Horton – trombone
- John Ray – choir conduction
- Roger Soren – bassoon, contrabassoon
- Wendy Doyle, Louise Harris – cello
- Doug Buchanan, Julie Edwards – viola
- John Chisholm – violin
- Trevor Johnson – English horn, oboe
- Scott Staidle – violin
- Marcus Ratzenboeck – violin
- Michael Anthony King – guitar, vocals
- Ron Aniello – keyboards, production
- Mike Shipley – mixing
- Robert Edwards – percussion

== Charts ==
Singles - Billboard (North America)

Year	Single	Chart	Position
2001	"Hang On to This"	Mainstream Rock Tracks	18
