= List of years in rock music =

This article lists the individual year in rock music pages. Each year is annotated with a few of the top performing bands, songs, and significant events of each year, with further details at each respective article.

== 2026 ==
- 2026 in rock music

== 2025 ==
- 2025 in rock music
  - Theatrically costumed and masked hard rock artists perform particularly well, with both Swedish rock band Ghost and English rock band Sleep Token attaining number one albums on the all-format US Billboard 200 album chart.
  - Twenty One Pilots cap off their series of conceptual albums with Breach, which becomes the third rock album of the year to debut at the top of the Billboard 200, and the biggest US debut for a rock album in the 2020s by total units.

== 2024 ==
- 2024 in rock music
  - Coldplay is the only rock band to have a number one album on the all-format US Billboard 200 album chart, though Twenty One Pilots has the highest debut for a rock album by units sold. Coldplay also tops 15 other national album charts and become the first group in history to gross over $1 billion on the same concert run with the Music of the Spheres World Tour.
  - Linkin Park reunites for the first time since 2017, with a new lineup that includes Emily Armstrong replacing deceased vocalist Chester Bennington. Their first single "The Emptiness Machine", debuts at number 3 on the Billboard Global 200, indicating it was the third most popular song in the world of the week, while their album, From Zero, debuts on the top of 16 separate national album charts and at number 2 in the US.

== 2023 ==
- 2023 in rock music
  - Blink 182 is the only rock band to have a number one album on the all-format US Billboard 200 album chart. The release is one of many that continues the surge of popularity in pop-punk music in the 2020s.
  - Linkin Park's "Lost" and Green Day's "The American Dream Is Killing Me" both spend 8 consecutive weeks atop of the Billboard Mainstream Rock Songs chart. "Lost" ends up as the number 1 song of the year on the same chart as well.
  - A number of genre bending rock and country artists find crossover success with releases, including Zach Bryan, Hardy, and Jelly Roll. Similarly, the death of Jimmy Buffett leads to a resurgence of popularity of his rock and country styled music.

== 2022 ==
- 2022 in rock music
  - Machine Gun Kelly and the Red Hot Chili Peppers have number one albums on the all-format US Billboard 200 album chart.
  - Two of some the biggest rock music releases find success in very different ways. Machine Gun Kelly's second rock album, Mainstream Sellout draws from a 2000s pop punk sound that has very high music streaming numbers for a rock album, and tops the Billboard 200 chart, while Swedish band Ghost's Impera finds success through its theatrical, metallic hard rock sound and the highest debut in pure sales in the US at the time of its release week, and peaks at number 2 on the Billboard 200.

== 2021 ==
- 2021 in rock music
  - For the first time, in the 2021 iteration of the chart, no rock albums released in 2021 make the top 200 best performing albums of the year in the US all-format Billboard 200 chart, nor do any rock albums top the chart over the course of the year. While the genre is noted to generally be in a state of decline, publications also note a resurgence in pop punk music. Part of this is due to rap and pop musicians' interest in the genre, including popular songs in the genre by Machine Gun Kelly, Olivia Rodrigo, and The Kid Laroi.
  - The COVID-19 pandemic delays many rock albums and tours originally meant for 2020 into 2021, and then some again into 2022.

== 2020 ==
- 2020 in rock music
  - Rapper Machine Gun Kelly goes through a radical style change and releases a pop punk album, titled Tickets to My Downfall. The album, along with AC/DC's Power Up in November, are the only rock albums to hit number one on the all-format US Billboard 200 album chart in 2020. Both Green Day and the Killers top both the UK and Australian all-format album charts.
  - The COVID-19 pandemic delays or outright cancels countless rock albums and tours scheduled for the year.
  - During the 2020 United States presidential election, many rock musicians oppose Donald Trump's unauthorized use of their music.

== 2019 ==
- 2019 in rock music
  - Tool, Slipknot and The Raconteurs have number one albums on the all-format US Billboard 200 album chart. Bring Me the Horizon tops the UK and Australian all-format album charts.
  - Disturbed spends 7 weeks at the top of the Billboard Mainstream Rock Songs chart between their singles "A Reason to Fight" and "No More". Five Finger Death Punch spend 6 weeks at the top of the chart across "When the Seasons Change" and their cover of "Blue on Black".
  - Tool releases their first album in 13 years, Fear Inoculum, and it has the biggest debut for a rock album in 2019. The first single, "Fear Inoculum", breaks the record for longest song to ever chart on the Billboard Hot 100 charts at 10 minutes 21 seconds. My Chemical Romance and Rage Against the Machine announce their reformation and intention to tour in the future.

== 2018 ==
- 2018 in rock music
  - Jack White, Dave Matthews Band, Fall Out Boy, and Panic! at the Disco all have number one albums on the all-format US Billboard 200 album chart. Greta Van Fleet have the best-selling album of the week in the US for their debut album Anthems of the Peaceful Army.
  - Ghost's single "Rats" tops the Mainstream Rock chart for seven straight weeks. Bad Wolves cover of The Cranberries song "Zombie" is the first rock song of 2018 to go platinum in the US, indicating sales of 1 million for the song.
  - A Perfect Circle releases their first album in 14 years, Eat the Elephant. Billy Corgan reforms 3/4's of the Smashing Pumpkins' original lineup.

== 2017 ==
- 2017 in rock music
  - Foo Fighters, Linkin Park, and U2 all have number one albums on the US all-format Billboard 200 album chart.
  - The Foo Fighters tops the Mainstream Rock charts for a cumulative 8 weeks across their two singles "Run" and "The Sky is a Neighborhood". Papa Roach's "Help" and Theory of a Deadman's "Rx (Medicate)" each spend six weeks at the top of the chart as well.
  - Both Chris Cornell, lead singer of Soundgarden and Audioslave, and Chester Bennington, lead singer of the band Linkin Park, die by suicide.

== 2016 ==
- 2016 in rock music
  - Blink 182, Green Day, and Panic! at the Disco all have number one albums on the US all-format Billboard 200 album chart.
  - Disturbed's single "The Sound of Silence", a rock cover version of the song by Simon & Garfunkel, tops the Mainstream Rock chart for seven straight weeks, and goes on to be certified triple platinum in the US, selling 3 million copies.
  - Coldplay performs at the halftime show for Super Bowl 50.

== 2015 ==
- 2015 in rock music
  - Disturbed, Breaking Benjamin, Twenty One Pilots, and Fall Out Boy all have number one albums on the US all-format Billboard 200 album chart.
  - Foo Fighters single "Something from Nothing" goes through the second half of its 13-week run at the top of the Mainstream Rock chart. Breaking Benjamin spends 9 weeks atop of the chart with "Failure", Shinedown spends 7 weeks with "Cut the Cord".
  - Country music musician Zac Brown and his band have success with more rock-oriented material, collaborating with the Foo Fighters on the song "Congregation", and with Chris Cornell with the song "Heavy is the Head", both of which top the Mainstream Rock chart for multiple weeks.

== 2014 ==
- 2014 in rock music
  - The Black Keys, Jack White, Slipknot, Tom Petty and the Heartbreakers, and Coldplay all have number one albums on the US all-format Billboard 200 chart.
  - Foo Fighters's single "Something From Nothing" spends 8 weeks atop of the Billboard Mainstream Rock songs chart, Seether's "Words as Weapons" and The Pretty Reckless's "Heaven Knows" both spend 5 weeks at the top of the chart each.
  - U2 releases their thirteenth studio album Songs of Innocence in a non-traditional and controversial manner - an automatic download to all registered iTunes accounts to mixed results.

== 2013 ==
- 2013 in rock music
  - Queens of the Stone Age, Pearl Jam, Avenged Sevenfold, Paramore, and Fall Out Boy all have number one albums on the US all-format Billboard 200 chart.
  - Avenged Sevenfold's single "Hail to the King" spends 10 weeks in a row, and 11 weeks cumulative, atop of the Billboard Mainstream Rock songs chart. Alice in Chains spends 8 weeks atop of the chart cumulatively between songs "Hollow" and "Stone", Soundgarden seven weeks across "Been Away Too Long" and "By Crooked Steps".
  - Remaining Stone Temple Pilots members (Dean DeLeo, Robert DeLeo and Eric Kretz) collaborate with Linkin Park vocalist Chester Bennington after the firing of original lead singer Scott Weiland. After legal battles over the name, the four excluding Weiland retain the rights to the band name and record and release an EP of material, High Rise, which includes the Mainstream Rock Songs chart topping song "Out of Time".

== 2012 ==
- 2012 in rock music
  - Linkin Park, Matchbox 20, Jack White, and Dave Matthews Band all have number one albums on the US all-format Billboard 200 album chart.
  - Three Days Grace's single "Chalk Outline" spends 13 consecutive weeks atop of the Billboard Mainstream Rock Songs chart. Shinedown spends a cumulative 16 weeks atop the chart between 12 weeks with "Bully" and 4 weeks with "Unity". Chevelle and Soundgarden each spend 7 weeks atop of the chart as well.
  - Soundgarden reforms and releases their first new material in 15 years.

== 2011 ==
- 2011 in rock music
  - Foo Fighters, Evanescence, Coldplay all have number one albums on the all-format US Billboard 200 album chart.
  - Seether's "Country Song" spends 10 consecutive weeks at number 1 on the Billboard Mainstream Rock songs chart. Foo Fighters spend 9 weeks atop of the chart between singles "Rope" and "Walk". Alterbridge's "Isolation" and Staind's "Not Again" spend 7 weeks at the top of the chart.
  - Red Hot Chili Peppers miss number one on the chart, but tops 18 other national album charts upon release. Nickelback misses having a number one album by a margin of ".18%".

== 2010 ==
- 2010 in rock music
  - Godsmack, Linkin Park, Avenged Sevenfold, and Disturbed all have number one albums on the all-format US Billboard 200 album chart.
  - Stone Sour's "Say You'll Haunt Me", Alice in Chains's "Your Decision", and Disturbed's "Another Way to Die" all have separate 8 week runs atop of the Billboard Mainstream Rock songs chart.
  - The low sales of Guitar Hero: Warriors of Rock puts a halt to the yearly releases of the Guitar Hero series of games that had previously been very popular in the late 2000s.

== 2009 ==
- 2009 in rock music
  - Green Day, Pearl Jam, Daughtry, U2, and Dave Matthews Band all have number one albums on the all-format US Billboard 200 album chart.
  - Both Linkin Park and Shinedown find crossover success with singles, with "New Divide" and "Second Chance" peaking at number 6 and 7 on the Billboard Hot 100 all-format song charts respectively.
  - A fan campaign succeeds in getting Rage Against the Machine's 1992 protest song "Killing in the Name" named the number one Christmas song in the UK that year.

== 2008 ==
- 2008 in rock music
  - Death Cab for Cutie, Radiohead, Disturbed, Three Doors Down, Coldplay, Slipknot, Metallica, and AC/DC all have number one albums on the US all-format Billboard 200 album chart.
  - Coldplay's song "Viva la Vida" is the top song in the US for a week.
  - Kings of Leon's Only by the Night is the best selling album of the year in Australia.

== 2007 ==
- 2007 in rock music
  - Fall Out Boy, Linkin Park, Modest Mouse, and Daughtry all have number one albums on the US all-format Billboard 200 album chart.
  - Multiple rock bands have songs in the top 10 of the US Billboard all-format singles chart, including My Chemical Romance ("Welcome to the Black Parade"), Fall Out Boy ("This Ain't a Scene, It's an Arms Race"), Daughtry ("It's Not Over", "Home"), Linkin Park ("What I've Done"), and Nickelback ("Rockstar").
  - Plain White T's song "Hey There Delilah" is the top song in the US for 2 consecutive weeks.

== 2006 ==
- 2006 in rock music
  - Tool, Red Hot Chili Peppers, Incubus, Godsmack, and AFI all have number one albums on the US all-format Billboard 200 chart.
  - Red Hot Chili Peppers "Dani California" peaks at number 6 on the Billboard Hot 100 chart, and spends 12 consecutive weeks at number one on the US Mainstream Rock chart. Three Days Grace has the top rock song of the year on rock radio with "Animal I Have Become", while another single, "Pain", tops the Mainstream Rock chart for 13 weeks straight.
  - Snow Patrol album, Eyes Open is the best selling album of 2006 in the UK. A wide variety of high profile spinout and supergroup bands, including Angels and Airwaves, +44, Audioslave, and Army of Anyone, release albums to varying degrees of success.

== 2005 ==
- 2005 in rock music
