= Enemy (Days of the New song) =

1999 single by Days of the New

Single by Days of the New

from the album Days of the New
- Released: August 10, 1999
- Genre: Acoustic rock
- Length: 5:11
- Label: Outpost
- Songwriter: Travis Meeks
- Producers: Travis Meeks; Todd Smith

Days of the New singles chronology
"Shelf in the Room" (1998)	"Enemy" (1999)	"Weapon & the Wound" (2000)

Audio sample
- "Enemy": file; help

"Enemy" is a song by American rock band Days of the New, released as the lead single from their second studio album, Days of the New also known as Green. Serviced to US rock radio in August 1999, the song reached number two on the US Billboard Mainstream Rock Tracks chart and number 10 on the Billboard Modern Rock Tracks, becoming their second song to enter the top 10 on the latter chart. "Enemy" also appears as the ninth track on The Definitive Collection, released in 2008.

== Overview ==
"Enemy" is a prime example of Travis Meeks' shift into new musical scape on "Green"; whereas the first album established a moderately stripped down acoustic rock style, "Enemy" incorporates classical strings as well as electronic effects and percussion comparable to that heard in dance club music. Regarding this decision, Meeks said, "It was an experiment. It was something that I wanted to try - just like putting red in a painting instead of using more blue, just trying something different." Acoustic guitar remains well implemented, however, and an echoed horn is also heard during the chorus. Vocal layering occurs throughout "Enemy" as well with clean singing in the foreground and a distant, hollower voice providing backup vocals. The song fades to silence as it nears the end. A moody acoustic guitar then enters which is soon accompanied by a lead guitar solo before slowly fading out together.

Meeks described the song composition process in an interview with LAUNCHcast, stating that he wrote the guitar and vocal pattern first before demoing in the studio. While there, he created the bass line and composed samples around that. Meeks also expressed hope that fans wouldn't get the impression that "Enemy" stylistically represents the entire album.

Lyrically, "Enemy" appears to focus on a vague dispute between a young man and his authority figure. The first lyric in the song proclaims, "Listen down you little man/I'm not the one who's trying to change you," yet perhaps ironically, also declares later, "you need to change now." Amidst these claims, the narrator also tries to maintain respect between the two and cite that he or she is not an enemy despite the aforementioned demands.

== Music video ==
A video was produced for a remixed version of "Enemy" which edits the song length to 4:21 and introduces more electronic effects. A director's cut was also made available at Launch.com. Filmed in mid-August 1999, "Enemy" was directed by John Schindler and Louisiana native Chip Dumstorf who was also responsible for the "Green" album's art direction.

The majority of "Enemy" was shot at The Louisville Palace with an invitation for fans to appear as extras in the August 19 shooting. Scenes taking place outside were shot along the Ohio River in Indiana. The video includes fast motion footage such as people using a revolving door and walking outside an apartment building. A bald, red-skinned figure crouches in front of a stained glass window and becomes the physical embodiment of the masked, feathered man seen on it. Throughout the video, this caped and hooded man plays a game of chess with Meeks before replacing his mask, reentering the window, and departing in his red-skinned form. The band performs in a dark, foggy room of trees similar to the album's cover art. Various characters in strange wardrobe are seen dancing among the group in an almost rave-like fashion. Other footage shows Meeks singing alone in the psychedelically colored outdoors; a truss bridge over the Ohio River can be seen in the background.

== Charts ==
=== Weekly charts ===
Chart (1999)	Peak position
Canada Rock/Alternative (RPM)	1
US Alternative Airplay (Billboard)	10
US Mainstream Rock (Billboard)	2

=== Year-end charts ===
Chart (1999)	Position
Canada Rock/Alternative (RPM)	5
US Mainstream Rock Tracks (Billboard)	19
US Modern Rock Tracks (Billboard)	69
