= Shelf in the Room =

Single by Days of the New

from the album Days of the New
- Released: September 1998
- Recorded: October–November 1996
- Studio: Woodland (Nashville, Tennessee)
- Genre: Post-grunge; alternative rock; acoustic rock
- Length: 4:44
- Label: Outpost
- Songwriter: Travis Meeks
- Producer: Scott Litt

Days of the New singles chronology
"The Down Town" (1998)	"Shelf in the Room" (1998)	"Enemy" (1999)

"Shelf in the Room" is a song by Days of the New and the third and final single from their self-titled debut album. The song reached #3 on Billboard's Mainstream Rock Tracks in 1998 and is a concert staple. "Shelf in the Room" is also the first track on the band's Definitive Collection released in 2008.

While perhaps not as popular as other singles from the album, "Shelf In The Room" is regarded for its engaging acoustic guitar melody and serves as the opening track. The song utilizes the basic instrumentation heard throughout the album but also features a vocal distortion during the chorus. Lyrically, the song often refers to a key and tends to vaguely describe emotional stability and isolation. The shelf is considered a means of security with the chorus line, "The shelf in the room has been so true/I can hide in the shelf in the room." It is also described as "holding me, and letting me stay." These themes are illustrated through the song's music video.

== Music video ==
The video for "Shelf in the Room", directed by Sean Mullens, bears the rural and color aesthetics depicted in the album art of Days of the New. It focuses on a troubled adolescent boy, likely a reflection of Days of the New frontman Travis Meeks. He is first seen glaring through the display window of an antique store before shattering it with his fists. The store owner comes out to yell at the boy who carelessly leaves. He is then shouted at by a man on the street and barked at by a dog, all of whom appear in a motion blur. Later on, the boy is surrounded by older kids who begin taunting him. He is chased out of town and into the woods where he finds solace in a small wooden building. While appearing no bigger than an outhouse from its exterior, inside is a large empty room. The boy places items he has obtained, including a set of old keys, a dead bird's feather, and shards of glass, on a shelf. He then sits curled up on a chair in the middle of the room.

Throughout these scenes, the band is shown performing in a wooden building with a shelf bearing various strange items that Meeks examines while he sings. He also uses a telephone device to perform the distorted vocal effect during the chorus. Meeks does not perform guitar in the video with the exception of the solo. He is also seen sitting on the floor under direct lighting much like the young boy. Items showcased on the shelf include a 19th-century photograph of a bearded man, an old photograph of two women wrestling, a gold Buddharupa, a glass jar of billiard balls, a wired gadget with an eyeball, an insect anatomy chart, and a severed porcelain doll arm giving the love gesture.

== Track listing ==
1. "Shelf in the Room"
2. "Special Guide"
3. "Whimsical"

== Chart ==
Chart (1998)	Peak position
Australia (ARIA Charts)	90
Billboard Modern Rock Tracks	22
Billboard Mainstream Rock Tracks	3
