= Days of the New (1999 album) =

Studio album by Days of the New
- Released: August 31, 1999
- Recorded: March 1998–May 1999
- Studio: Distillery Sound (Louisville); Louie's Clubhouse (Los Angeles); Ocean Way Recording (Los Angeles)
- Genre: Acoustic rock, post-grunge, alternative rock
- Length: 63:38
- Label: Outpost
- Producer: Travis Meeks; Todd Smith

Days of the New chronology
Days of the New (1997)	Days of the New (1999)	Days of the New (2001)

Singles from Days of the New
- 1. "Enemy" Released: July 22, 1999; 2. "Weapon and the Wound" Released: 2000

Days of the New (also known as the Green album or Days of the New II) is the second self-titled album by American alternative rock band Days of the New. Released on August 31, 1999, it marks the first album following the breakup of the original lineup and the last under Outpost. While not nearly as commercially successful as its predecessor Days of the New (1997), Green acquired stronger appreciation from critics and featured two successful singles.

== Overview ==
Shortly after finishing their 1998 tour with Metallica and Jerry Cantrell, after much turmoil, the original Days of the New split up. Todd Whitener, Matt Taul, and Jesse Vest would go on to form Tantric while Meeks carried on the Days of the New name. In February 1999, it was reported that while his ex-bandmates were looking for a new singer, Meeks was finishing up work on a second album tentatively titled Days of the New 2 with an expected release in late spring or early summer that year. He eventually formed a new band lineup and hired an orchestra for this project.

In contrast to the band's first album, which has a more of a stripped-down acoustic style, Green incorporates many different elements, namely an orchestra and female backing vocals. The darker song writing is also deemphasized in favor of more upbeat melodies as seen in "Flight Response" and "Take Me Back Then". Many of the album's songs contain intros and codas to seamlessly carry into the next song. While largely maintaining the acoustic feel of its predecessor (as evidenced by the folk number "Provider") Green even utilizes electronic percussion more commonly found in dance club music, particularly in the track "Enemy". This song, along with "Weapon and the Wound", became the album's radio singles.

A young Nicole Scherzinger took a break from her studies at Wright State University to sing backing vocals for Green. Meeks noted that he wanted a female singer to "deliver some more world/operatic textures and sounds" and that her contributions were not buried in the back but instead featured prominently alongside his. Scherzinger performs on "Flight Response", "The Real", "Take Me Back Then", "Phobics of Tragedy", "Bring Yourself", and "Last One". Meeks claims that after touring for the album, the two grew apart creatively and that despite being an "amazing entertainer", she "didn't seem to understand music very well." Taul played drums on "Flight Response" and "I Think".

== Touring and promotion ==
In June 1999, the band tentatively planned to tour Europe in September before a lengthy US tour in the summer of 2000, but this did not pan out. Meeks debuted his new seven-member band lineup on September 4, 1999, at the Ear Xtacy store in Louisville. According to Pollstar, the official tour would begin in Pensacola, Florida, on October 22; however, Yahoo! Music stated that same day that touring would run from October 21 in Chattanooga, Tennessee, through November 27 in Louisville, Kentucky. The concerts exhibited "more of a dramatic show" and "more of a choreographed direction" compared to previous Days of the New tours. This included a backdrop screen, stage props, and other effects and, in the words of Travis Meeks, wouldn't be "just a rock 'n' roll show" but " more of a sensory-experience thing."

According to Meeks, the band toured for two months in support of Green after which he and Scherzinger had a "small fling". Despite her already having a boyfriend, Meeks admits to having had a crush on her during this period. He later expressed interest in working with her again on his much delayed Days of the New Presents Tree Colors.

Green had two singles. Its lead, "Enemy", charted well and gained music video rotation on MTV. A second single, "Weapon and the Wound," charted at number 10 on Mainstream Rock Tracks.

== Reception ==
Professional ratings
Review scores
Source	Rating
AllMusic	3/5 stars
The Boston Phoenix	2/4 stars
The Encyclopedia of Popular Music	4/5 stars
Entertainment Weekly	B
Los Angeles Times	3/4 stars
The Philadelphia Inquirer	3/4 stars
Rolling Stone	3/5 stars
San Francisco Examiner	5/5 stars
Stereo Review	4/5 stars
Wall of Sound	67/100

Critics were fairly enthusiastic of Green. Allmusic's Stephen Thomas Erlewine named it an AMG Album Pick and praised Meeks' production abilities, calling it a "definite improvement from his debut." Tom Lanham of Entertainment Weekly gave it a B grade and noted, "Like Roger Waters, [Meeks] toys with colorful tones and textures and waxes ponderous in a schoolmaster baritone. Some tracks stumble awkwardly, but inventive oomph pulls this naif through."

Despite better critical reception, Green sold poorly compared to the first album. By October 1999, it had sold only 124,000 copies according to SoundScan. It would eventually reach around 300,000 copies sold. Only one song, "Enemy", was a major hit, and the second single, a ballad entitled "Weapon and the Wound", charted reasonably well. In 2004, Metal Hammer included the album on its list of "50 Lost Classics".

== Track listing ==
All songs written by Travis Meeks except where noted.

1. "Flight Response" – 5:55
2. "The Real" (Meeks, Todd Whitener) – 4:18
3. "Enemy" – 5:11
4. "Weapon & the Wound" – 5:44
5. "Skeleton Key" – 3:02
6. "Take Me Back Then" – 4:16
7. "Bring Yourself" – 5:55
8. "I Think" – 5:51
9. "Longfellow" – 1:56
10. "Intro" – 1:42
11. "Phobics of Tragedy" – 3:26
12. "Not the Same" – 4:24
13. "Provider" – 5:53
14. "Last One" (Meeks, Whitener) – 4:37

== Outtakes ==
- "The Sun"
- "Requiem" - unreleased coda

== Personnel ==
- Travis Meeks: lead vocals, guitar
- Max Maxwell: drums
- Pete Peterson: arrangements
- Peter Rhee: drums
- Ray Rizzo: percussion
- Nicole Scherzinger: backing vocals
- Carl Shields: drums
- Matt Taul: drums
- Alex Tench: backing vocals
- Brian Vinson: bass
- Orchestra
  - Conducted and arranged: Suzie Katayama
  - Members: Rick Baptist, Charles Boito, Eve Butler, Jon Clarke, Larry Corbett, Mario DeLeon, Joel Derouin, Virginia Frazer, Matthew J. Funes, Geraldo Hilera, Steven M. Holtman, Ronald Janelli, John T. Johnson, Renita Koven, Daniel Smith, David Stone, John Wittenberg, and Phillip E. Yao
- Choir
  - Sandie Hall, Linda Harmon, Luana Jackman, Victor Janacua, Bob Joyce, Jon Joyce, Rick Logan, Suzie Katayama, Donna Medina, and Oren Waters

== Production credits ==
- Produced by Travis Meeks and Todd Smith
- Engineered by Todd Smith with Mike Baker and Clark Hagan
- Mixed by Scott Litt, Travis Meeks, Todd Smith
- Digital Engineer: Greg Fidelman
- Second Engineers: Victor Janacua, Bill McCord, Al Sanderson, Alex Tench

== Artwork ==
- Creative Direction: Jeral Tidwell
- Art and Digital Direction: Chip Dumstorf
- Illustrations: Jeral Tidwell
- Graphic Design: Chip Dumstorf and Travis Meeks
- Photography: Theresa Carpenter, Chaz Rough, and Larry Smith

== Charts ==
Singles - Billboard (North America)

Year	Single	Chart	Position
1999	"Enemy"	Mainstream Rock Tracks	2
1999	"Enemy"	Modern Rock Tracks	10
2000	"Weapon and the Wound"	Mainstream Rock Tracks	10
