= Days of the New: Live Bootleg =

Live album by Days of the New
- Released: 2004
- Genre: Post-grunge; Acoustic rock World music
- Label: Independent Record Label
- Producer: Travis Meeks

Days of the New: Live Bootleg is a 2004 live album by acoustic rock/world music band Days of the New.

== Track listing ==
1. Words 5:41
2. Freak 6:38
3. How Do You Know You? 5:31
4. Shelf in the Room 5:22
5. I Think 5:35
6. Orch of the Medium* 6:48
7. The Down Town 4:47
8. Solitude 4:52
9. Dirty Road 6:01
10. Enemy 4:44
11. Touch, Peel and Stand 9:03
- (* Previously unreleased tracks)
