= Adrenaline (Shinedown song) =

Single by Shinedown

from the album Amaryllis
- Released: August 13, 2013
- Studio: Ocean Way (Los Angeles); Capitol (Hollywood)
- Genre: Alternative metal; hard rock
- Length: 3:25
- Label: Atlantic
- Songwriters: Brent Smith; Dave Bassett
- Producer: Rob Cavallo

Shinedown singles chronology
"I'll Follow You" (2013)	"Adrenaline" (2013)	"Cut the Cord" (2015)

Music video
- "Adrenaline" on YouTube

"Adrenaline" is the fifth single from American rock band Shinedown's fourth studio album, Amaryllis.

== Release ==
The song was released on August 13, 2013. The official video premiered on the band's YouTube channel on October 30, 2013.

== Use in media ==
The song was the official theme song of WWE Extreme Rules 2012. It is also the official theme song of the monster truck Extreme Attitude.

== Charts ==
Chart (2013–14)	Peak position
US Mainstream Rock (Billboard)	4
US Rock & Alternative Airplay (Billboard)	16
