= The Down Town =

1998 single by Days of the New

- Australian CD single cover artwork

Single by Days of the New

from the album Days of the New
- Released: May 12, 1998
- Length: 4:16
- Label: Outpost
- Songwriter: Travis Meeks
- Producer: Scott Litt

Days of the New singles chronology
"Touch, Peel and Stand" (1997)	"The Down Town" (1998)	"Shelf in the Room" (1998)

Music video
- "The Down Town" on YouTube

"The Down Town" is a song by American rock band Days of the New, released as the second single from their self-titled debut album. Like its predecessor, the song reached number one on the US Billboard Mainstream Rock Tracks chart in 1998. "The Down Town" is also the third track on the band's Definitive Collection, released in 2008.

== Composition ==
Lyrically, "The Down Town" ambiguously details a town of drug users who are afraid of change and suppressive of the narrator. The phrase "to bring me down" is rebelliously shouted throughout the chorus. A mention of pointless and rejected concern over another person's well-being is also addressed during the bridge. Given this theme of negativity, the "Down Town" song title may be intended as a double entendre or pun.

== Music video ==
The "Down Town" video, directed by Lance Bangs, consists of a live concert performance. It retains the live audio and includes some notable differences from the studio recording; verse chords are used extensively in various parts, more punchy staccato is incorporated, and the first lyric of the bridge is changed to "I don't think that I should give a fuck about you." The performance lasts nearly a whole minute longer at 5:10.

== Track listing ==
1. "The Down Town" (LP version)
2. "The Down Town" (radio remix version)
3. "Touch, Peel and Stand" (live)
4. "Freak" (live)
- The live tracks were recorded at the New World Music Theatre for Rock 103.5 Chicago's Rockstock '97 on September 6, 1997.

== Charts ==
=== Weekly charts ===
Chart (1998)	Peak position
US Alternative Airplay (Billboard)	19
US Mainstream Rock (Billboard)	1

=== Year-end charts ===
Chart (1998)	Position
US Mainstream Rock Tracks (Billboard)	3
US Modern Rock Tracks (Billboard)	72

== Release history ==
Region	Date	Format(s)	Label(s)	Ref.
United States	May 12, 1998	Contemporary hit radio	Outpost	
United States	May 25, 1998	Active rock radio	Outpost	
