= I'll Follow You (Shinedown song) =

Single by Shinedown

from the album Amaryllis
- Released: February 5, 2013
- Studio: Ocean Way (Los Angeles); Capitol (Hollywood)
- Length: 3:58
- Label: Atlantic
- Songwriters: Brent Smith; Dave Bassett; Eric Bass
- Producer: Rob Cavallo

Shinedown singles chronology
"Enemies" (2012)	"I'll Follow You" (2013)	"Adrenaline" (2013)

Music video
- "I'll Follow You" on YouTube

"I'll Follow You" is the fourth single from American rock band Shinedown's fourth studio album, Amaryllis.

== Release ==
The song was released on February 5, 2013.

== Track listing ==
No.	Title	Length
1.	"I'll Follow You" (Smith, Bassett, Bass)	3:58

== Music videos ==
The official video premiered on the band's YouTube channel on June 15, 2013. An alternate music video for the song was released on February 14, 2017.

== Charts ==
=== Weekly charts ===
Weekly chart performance for "I'll Follow You"
Chart (2013)	Peak position
Canada Rock (Billboard)	9
US Hot Rock & Alternative Songs (Billboard)	25
US Rock & Alternative Airplay (Billboard)	8

=== Year-end charts ===
Year-end chart performance for "I'll Follow You"
Chart (2013)	Position
US Hot Rock Songs (Billboard)	50
US Rock Airplay (Billboard)	34
