= Enemies (Shinedown song) =

Single by Shinedown

from the album Amaryllis
- Released: July 17, 2012
- Studio: Ocean Way (Los Angeles); Capitol (Hollywood)
- Length: 3:08
- Label: Atlantic
- Songwriters: Brent Smith; Dave Bassett; Eric Bass
- Producer: Rob Cavallo

Shinedown singles chronology
"Unity" (2012)	"Enemies" (2012)	"I'll Follow You" (2013)

Music video
- "Enemies" on YouTube

"Enemies" is the third single from American rock band Shinedown's fourth studio album, Amaryllis.

== Track listing ==
No.	Title	Length
1.	"Enemies" (Smith, Bass, Bassett)	3:08

== Music video ==
The video shows the band sitting in a private meeting, in an open and empty room. The lyrics in the song simulate the dialogue, and how it causes the resulting "fight" that ensues.

== In popular culture ==
This song was used as the opening theme for WWE Raw from July 25, 2016, to January 22, 2018, as well as being featured in the WWE 2K18 video game.

== Charts ==
=== Weekly charts ===
Weekly chart performance for "Enemies"
Chart (2012–13)	Peak position
Canada Rock (Billboard)	40
US Hot Rock & Alternative Songs (Billboard)	29
US Rock & Alternative Airplay (Billboard)	8

=== Year-end charts ===
2012 year-end chart performance for "Enemies"
Chart (2012)	Position
US Hot Rock Songs (Billboard)	94

2013 year-end chart performance for "Enemies"
Chart (2013)	Position
US Rock Airplay (Billboard)	47

== Certifications ==
Certifications for "Enemies"
Region	Certification	Certified units/sales
Canada (Music Canada)	Gold	40,000^{‡}
^{‡} Sales+streaming figures based on certification alone.
