= The Last Outpost =

The Last Outpost may refer to:

- The Last Outpost (1935 film), a 1935 film with Cary Grant
- The Last Outpost (1951 film), a 1951 film starring Ronald Reagan
- "The Last Outpost" (Star Trek: The Next Generation), a first-season episode of Star Trek: The Next Generation
- Gundam W G-Unit: Last Outpost, the Tokyopop release of the manga side story Gundam Wing Dual Story: G-UNIT
- Last Outpost, a 2018 Discovery Channel reality television series centered around a metal fabrication/mechanical modification shop based in Anchorage, Alaska

== See also ==
- Outpost (disambiguation)
