= Touch, Peel and Stand =

Single by Days of the New

from the album Days of the New
- B-side: "Independent Slaves"; "Got to Be You"
- Released: July 1997
- Length: 4:57
- Label: Outpost
- Songwriter: Travis Meeks
- Producer: Scott Litt

Days of the New singles chronology
"Touch, Peel and Stand" (1997)	"The Down Town" (1998)

Music video
- "Touch, Peel and Stand" on YouTube

"Touch, Peel and Stand" is a song by the American rock band Days of the New, released as the lead single from their self-titled debut album. It was released in July 1997 and reached number one on the US Billboard Mainstream Rock Tracks chart, retaining the spot for a then-record 16 weeks. The song also rose to number six on the Billboard Modern Rock Tracks chart, becoming their first top-10 hit on the chart. The song was named the "Greatest of All-Time Mainstream Rock Song" by Billboard in 2021.

"Touch, Peel and Stand" is known for its raw, acoustic feel and maintains considerable radio play to this day. Despite the fact that Travis Meeks writes the majority of the songs by Days of the New, and considers it his own personal project, he has praised Matt Taul's cymbal-heavy percussion in the song. In a 2008 interview, Meeks noted, "As far as I'm concerned, he owns the track."

The cover art of the "Touch, Peel and Stand" CD single borrows a photograph from the band's debut album liner notes. This depicts the Wrestling Superstars figure of George "The Animal" Steele. The rubber figure is heavily battered with both his head and left arm torn off.

== Music video ==
The music video for "Touch, Peel and Stand", directed by Frank W. Ockenfels 3, has a disgruntled young man (Lead Singer Travis Meeks' friend Levi Sulivan) watching TV in a filthy, rundown house. On the TV screen, the band is performing the song in a gray, open-spaced room and appears to acknowledge the man through the screen. He eventually becomes enraged and tosses furniture around the room before entering the bathroom and cutting off his long hair and shaving his head bald. Photos of the band are seen throughout his house. The man is eventually seen, with clothes neatly tucked in, facing a closed curtain while the band continues to perform in the TV screen.

== Live performances ==
The song was performed live on the Late Show with David Letterman on November 28, 1997.

== Track listings ==
The CD single, released in 1998, also includes two B-sides: "Independent Slaves" and "Got to be You." The former was also included on the Crow: Salvation soundtrack while the latter appeared on 2 Guitars, Bass & Drums: Songs for Survival.

1. "Touch, Peel and Stand"
2. "Independent Slaves"
3. "Got to Be You"

== Charts ==
=== Weekly charts ===
Chart (1997–1998)	Peak position
Australia (ARIA)	38
Canada Top Singles (RPM)	32
Canada Rock/Alternative (RPM)	5
New Zealand (Recorded Music NZ)	35
Scottish Singles Sales (Official Charts)	91
UK Singles (Official Charts)	88
US Hot 100 Airplay (Billboard)	57
US Mainstream Rock Tracks (Billboard)	1
US Modern Rock Tracks (Billboard)	6

=== Year-end charts ===
Chart (1997)	Position
Canada Rock/Alternative (RPM)	49
US Mainstream Rock Tracks (Billboard)	8
US Modern Rock Tracks (Billboard)	77

Chart (1998)	Position
US Mainstream Rock Tracks (Billboard)	4
US Modern Rock Tracks (Billboard)	24

=== All-time charts ===
Chart (1981–2021)	Position
US Mainstream Rock Tracks (Billboard)	1

== Certifications ==
Region	Certification	Certified units/sales
New Zealand (RMNZ)	Gold	15,000^{‡}
^{‡} Sales+streaming figures based on certification alone.

== Covers ==
"Touch, Peel and Stand (Reimagined)", in the style of NÜ-JAZZ (a fusion of house music and jazz) from the album, Wish You Were Brooklyn by Jonathan Hay on (Ingrooves (part of Virgin Music Group), a subsidiary of Universal Music Group. Hay is a former business partner of Travis Meeks.

== In popular culture ==
"Touch, Peel and Stand" was featured on compilations like X-Games, Vol. 3 in 1998, Shine! in 2000, and Total Rock and Crossing All Over, Vol. 7 in 2002. It can also be found on the soundtrack to Hitman Hart: Wrestling with Shadows released in 1999 and Days of the New: The Definitive Collection released March 2008.

The song appeared in the ninth episode of Dawson's Creek, originally airing on March 17, 1998.

In January 2006, the song was featured in a TV commercial for TLC's reality television program Beyond the Bull.

The song was briefly featured in the 2011 documentary series Metal Evolution episode 7, which covered grunge's role in the history of metal.
