= Hats Off to the Bull (song) =

Single by Chevelle

from the album Hats Off to the Bull
- Released: February 16, 2012
- Studio: JHOC (Pasadena, California)
- Length: 3:55
- Label: Epic
- Songwriters: Pete Loeffler; Sam Loeffler; Dean Bernardini
- Producer: Joe Barresi

Chevelle singles chronology
"Face to the Floor" (2011)	"Hats Off to the Bull" (2012)	"Same Old Trip" (2012)

Music video
- "Hats Off to the Bull" on YouTube

"Hats Off to the Bull" is a song by American rock band Chevelle. It was released on February 16, 2012, as the second single from the band's sixth studio album, Hats Off to the Bull (2011). The song also appears on the band's greatest hits album, Stray Arrows: A Collection of Favorites (2012).

The song has been described as an anti-animal cruelty song, especially criticizing bullfighting.

== Critical reception ==
Loudwire ranked it the seventh greatest Chevelle song. AOL Radio called it the ninth best rock song of 2011.

== Music video ==
A music video was released for the song via the band's Vevo and YouTube accounts on April 18, 2012 and was directed by P.R. Brown, who also directed the video for previous single "Face to the Floor".

The video begins with the band members waking up on the street, bloodied and bruised, before they are attacked by an unseen force. The unseen force is revealed to be a kid, playing with toy figures of the band, much like a voodoo doll. The video ends with the kid stepping on the toys, killing the band members and zooms in to reveal he is holding a toy figurine of a bull.

== Charts ==
=== Weekly charts ===
Weekly chart performance for "Hats Off to the Bull"
Chart (2012)	Peak position
Canada Rock (Billboard)	43
US Hot Rock & Alternative Songs (Billboard)	6

=== Year-end charts ===
Year-end chart performance for "Hats Off to the Bull"
Chart (2012)	Position
US Hot Rock Songs (Billboard)	23
