= Days of the New =

American rock band

- The original line-up of Days of the New. (L–R): Jesse Vest, Todd Whitener, Matt Taul and Travis Meeks

Background information
- Origin: Charlestown, Indiana, U.S.
- Genres: Post-grunge; alternative rock; acoustic rock; alternative metal
- Years active: 1995–2014
- Labels: Outpost; Geffen; Interscope
- Spinoffs: Tantric
- Past members: Todd Whitener; Jesse Vest; Matt Taul; Mike Starr; Ray Rizzo; Larry Montgomery; Brian Vinson; Malcolm Gold; Mike Huettig; Geddy Friedman; Rachael Beaver; Taylor James; Jason Fresta; Nicole Scherzinger; Charlie Colin; Anthony Sickles; Dave Medcalf; Jess Gayle; Kimmet Cantwell; Doug Florio; Travis Meeks

Days of the New was an American rock band from Charlestown, Indiana, formed in 1995. The band later relocated to Louisville, Kentucky. They consisted of vocalist/guitarist Travis Meeks and a variety of supporting musicians. They are best known for the hit singles "Touch, Peel and Stand", "The Down Town", "Shelf in the Room", and "Enemy". "Touch, Peel and Stand" was named "Greatest of All-Time Mainstream Rock Song" by Billboard.

The band was formed by Meeks as an acoustic solo project during his teenage years. Their debut album, Days of the New, informally known as the Yellow or Orange album, was released in 1997 and featured Meeks, along with Jesse Vest, Todd Whitener and Matt Taul. Vest, Whitener and Taul went on to form Tantric. The group briefly included future pop star and The Pussycat Dolls frontwoman Nicole Scherzinger on their 1999 album, also named Days of the New, but informally known as the Green album to distinguish it from the first album. Other band members included drummer Ray Rizzo, bassist Mike Starr (Alice in Chains) and bassist Charlie Colin (Train). The group's third album was also called Days of the New, informally known as the Red album, released in 2001.

== History ==
=== Early years ===
Days of the New began as an experimental rock/groove metal trio called Dead Reckoning, with Meeks, Matt Taul, and Jesse Vest. When they turned to an acoustic sound, they changed the name of the band and added guitarist Todd Whitener.

A demo version of the song "Freak" appeared on the Harvest Showcase Volume 3, a compilation of Louisville area artists. This recording features a solo performance by Meeks credited to Days of the New. Jesse Vest and Mat Taul are listed as band members in the liner notes although they do not appear on this recording.

Producer Scott Litt, known for working with R.E.M and Nirvana, signed the band to his label Outpost Recordings, a joint venture with Geffen Records.

=== 1996–1998 ===
The band recorded their first album, Days of the New, at Allen Martin Productions in Louisville, Kentucky, in October and November 1996. The first Days of the New release, frequently called "Orange" or "Yellow" after the color of the disc and liner notes, was released in 1997, selling 1.5 million copies worldwide. Three songs from this album were hits: "Touch, Peel and Stand", "The Down Town" and "Shelf in the Room". The first was No. 1 on Billboard's Rock Chart for 17 weeks; "The Down Town" and "Shelf in the Room" were each top 40 hits.

The band contributed the song "Running Knees" to Godzilla: The Album.

The band had internal problems early on. Shortly after releasing their debut album, Days of the New began touring smaller venues. MTV reported that, after missing a Florida concert in April, the band members appeared physically black-eyed and beaten the following day after what sources claimed to be a band brawl. They toured with Metallica and Jerry Cantrell starting June, 1998. Meeks criticized this billing, arguing that due to their acoustic sound, Days of the New should have toured with a group like Dave Matthews Band.

Just before starting the summer tour, Meeks had told interviewers that all of his fellow band members were holding him back and, consequently, were being released from the group. He said they were disappointed by this decision but he thought they would remain friends. An Outpost spokesperson, claimed that "Travis just talks" and nothing was official. Before they could fulfill club touring duties with Finger Eleven and Flight 16 in December, without citing reason, Meeks canceled in early November. Various explanations were given by band members and a label spokesperson including poor tour scheduling, band fighting, and Meeks being physically ill. It was confirmed in February 1999 that the band split up. Todd Whitener, Mat Taul, and Jesse Vest formed C14, renamed Tantric, while Meeks formed a new band under the Days of the New name.

There are two contradictory explanations of the original Days of the New breakup. Comments by Meeks in 1998 led to reports that he fired the rest of the band. Meeks has called this telling false and claims the other band members were jealous that he was paid more than they were. When Meeks announced the news, he said "It's like a journey in the wilderness – you know with like the struggle and stuff. I made it through, I survived, but the other guys didn't." He posted comments online: "It wasn't truly a band format. It is my fault for leading you on and setting you up to get attached to the prior members." In 2002, Meeks called in to The Howard Stern Show and was asked by Stern why he did not stick with the original members. He replied, "They had no spirituality. They had no brains." When Stern pointed out, "They had hits!" he gave the vague response, "That's not what I'm into. I'm into the truth."

=== 1999–2001 ===
Shortly after the original band's breakup, Meeks recorded a second album, Days of the New, informally referred to as the Green album to distinguish it from the group's first album with the same title. The Green album was released on August 31, 1999. Meeks debuted his new band on September 4, 1999, at the ear X-tacy store in Louisville. Critics were fairly enthusiastic about the album but it sold poorly compared to the previous effort.

In February 2000, Meeks returned to the studio with a new band and recorded his third album as Days of the New, completing it by July. Like the previous two albums, it was titled Days of the New, but called the Red album by the media. The first single, "Hang on to This" peaked at No. 18 on the US Rock Chart and was the most added song on rock radio the week of its debut. The album, released two weeks after the September 11, 2001 attacks with very little promotion, sold 90,000 copies. Days of the New toured with Creed and 3 Doors Down.

=== 2002–2014 ===
After touring for Red, the band parted ways with Interscope and had a period of inactivity. In December 2002, Meeks was involved in a high-profile audition for Velvet Revolver with several former members of Guns N' Roses. In the later half of 2003, Meeks embarked on a solo tour, performing at small venues. In January 2004, Days of the New split with Interscope Records over creative differences. His addiction to methamphetamine continued and in early 2005, he appeared on A&E's Intervention, where family and friends convinced him to enter rehab.

In September 2005, Meeks announced he had achieved sobriety and was writing for a fourth Days of the New record.

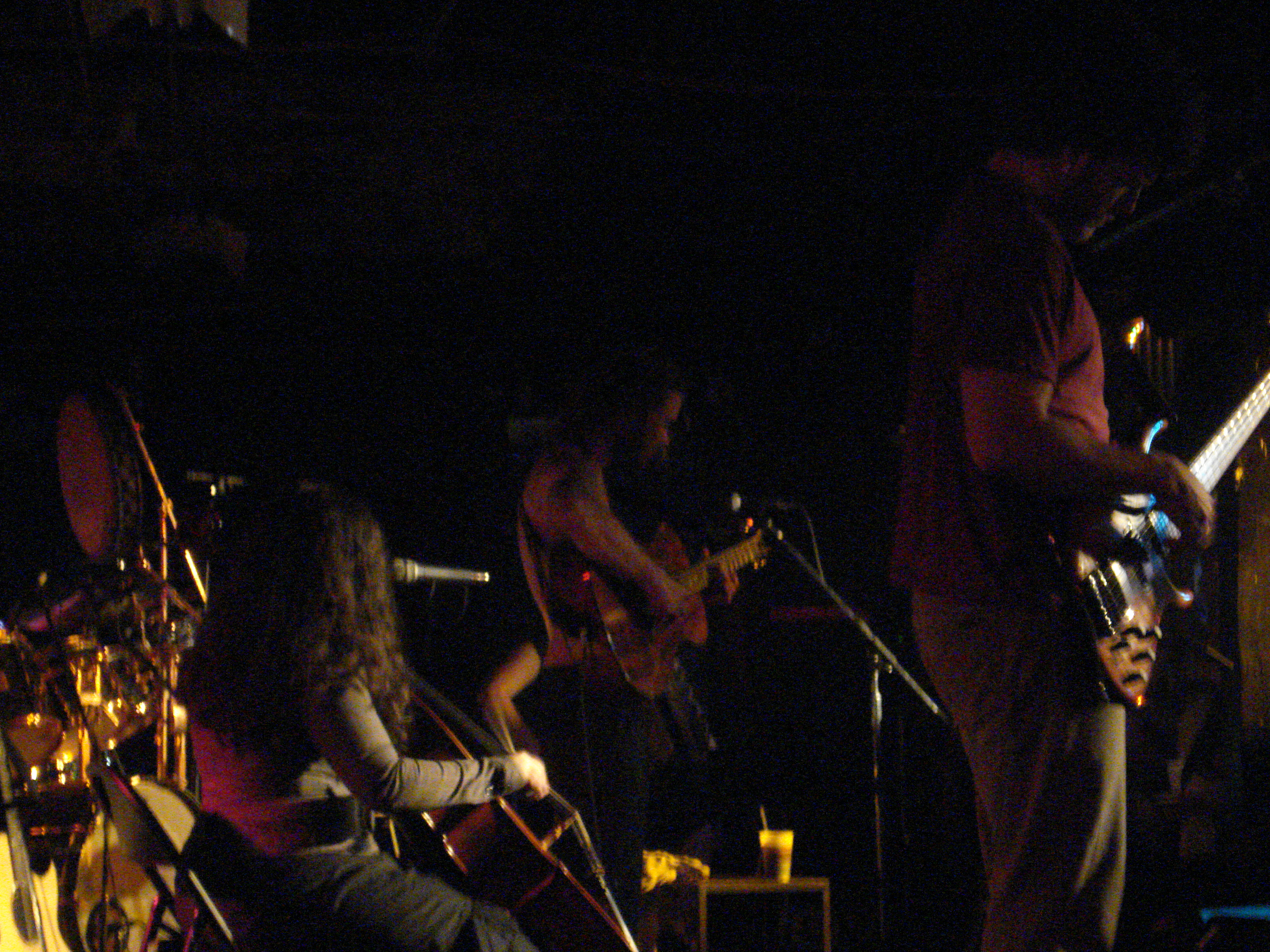
Days of the New performing in Clarksville, Tennessee, in 2008

On March 4, 2008, Geffen released Days of the New: The Definitive Collection, the first compilation of the band. Meeks stated that the upcoming record will be called Days of the New Presents Tree Colors.

In 2010, Mike Starr of Alice in Chains began playing with Meeks, preparing for a tour that would also feature Charlie Colin of Train. Starr died on March 8, 2011, before touring had begun.

In 2014, the original lineup of Days of the New announced they had reunited and were planning a summer tour called Full Circle. On May 30, 2014, Days of the New announced plans to release an EP with new material that fall.

Following a cancelled date, the band abruptly ended a set on September 6 due to Meeks being too drunk to perform. Bassist Jesse Vest took the microphone to inform the crowd that it was the band's last show together. In the next several days, the band released several statements on Facebook claiming they had reunited with Meeks because, after he had unsuccessfully tried to recruit other musicians, he begged them to return.

On September 26, 2014, the band announced on Facebook that they again would be going their separate ways with Meeks retaining the Days of the New name. Meeks put a new lineup together and continued touring but was arrested in Portland, Maine on October 10, 2014, on a warrant for failure to appear in court to answer charges of possessing a hypodermic needle.

=== Post breakup ===
In April 2017, Meeks had been released from jail and was posting on social media.

In August 2018, after a four-year hiatus, Meeks played a solo show.

On March 3, 2021, an unofficial bootleg compilation of some of Days of the New's rarer tracks, entitled The Gift, was released illegally without the consent of the band or previous record label. 911 Entertainment Records have since confirmed this was wrong and pulled the release from all streaming platforms, effective immediately. 911 Entertainment Records issued an apology and pulled the bootleg album from streaming services. However, shortly after on July 26, 2021, 911 Entertainment Records released a revised version of the compilation, removing and adding several songs, titled Illusion is Now.

== Members ==
- Travis Meeks – lead vocals, guitar (1995–2014)
- Todd Whitener – guitar, backing vocals (1995–1999, 2014)
- Jesse Vest – bass (1995–1999, 2014)
- Matt Taul – drums (1995–1999, 2014)
- Mike Starr – bass (2010–2011; died 2011)
- Ray Rizzo – drums, percussion (1999–2008)
- Brian Vinson – bass, upright bass (1999–2000, 2007–2010)
- Dave Neill – bass, upright bass (2010, 2012)
- Billy Youngblood – bass (2010)
- Rob Edwards – drums (2009–2010)
- Malcolm Gold – bass (2007–2009, 2012)
- Jason Fresta – bass (2011–2014)
- Taylor James – guitar, alto guitar (2008)
- Rachael Beaver – cello, backing vocals (2008)
- Brigid Kaelin – accordion, backing vocals (2008)
- Geddy Friedman – drums (2010)
- Chuck Mingis – guitar (2001–2003)
- Michael Huettig – bass (2000–2002)
- Nicole Scherzinger – backing vocals (1999–2000)
- Doug Florio – guitar (1999–2001; died 2018)
- Kimmet Cantwell – keyboards (1999–2001)
- Shane Vetter – guitar (2000)
- Karen Rombat – flutist (2003–2005)
- Craig Wagner – guitar (1999–2000)
- Charlie Colin – bass (2010, 2014)
- Paul Culligan – drums (2004–2012, 2014)
- Damon Fountain – drums, backing vocals, rhythm guitar (1998–2001)
- Michael Anthony King – guitars, backing vocals (2001–2003, 2007–2009, 2014)
- Adam Turgeon – drums (1996; died 2020)

== Discography ==
=== Studio albums ===
Year	Album details	Peak chart positions				Sales	Certifications (sales thresholds)
Year	Album details	US	AUS	NZL	UK	Sales	Certifications (sales thresholds)
1997	Days of the New (yellow): Released: June 3, 1997; Label: Outpost (30004); Format: CD, CS	54	47	1	183	US: 1,100,000	RIAA: Platinum; MC: Platinum; RMNZ: Gold
1999	Days of the New (green): Released: August 31, 1999; Label: Outpost (30037); Format: CD, CS	40	93	—	—	US: 300,000	
2001	Days of the New (red): Released: September 25, 2001; Label: Outpost (490767); Format: CD, CS	91	—	—	—	US: 80,000	
"—" denotes a release that did not chart.

=== Live albums ===
Year	Album details
2004	Live Bootleg: Release: 2004; Formats: CD

=== Compilation albums ===
Year	Album details
2008	The Definitive Collection: Released: March 4, 2008; Label: Geffen (1046602); Formats: CD

=== Singles ===
Year	Song	Peak chart positions					Certifications	Album
Year	Song	US Alt.	US Main.	AUS	NZL	UK	Certifications	Album
1997	"Touch, Peel and Stand"	6	1	38	35	88	RMNZ: Gold	Days of the New (yellow)
1998	"The Down Town"	19	1	—	—	—		Days of the New (yellow)
1998	"Shelf in the Room"	22	3	90	—	—		Days of the New (yellow)
1999	"Enemy"	10	2	—	—	—		Days of the New (green)
2000	"Weapon & the Wound"	—	10	—	—	—		Days of the New (green)
2001	"Hang on to This"	—	18	—	—	—		Days of the New (red)
2002	"Die Born"	—	—	—	—	—		Days of the New (red)
"—" denotes a release that did not chart.

=== Soundtracks and notable appearances ===
- "Independent Slaves" – from the Touch, Peel and Stand single and on the Crow: Salvation soundtrack
- "Got to Be You" – from the Touch, Peel and Stand single and on 2 Guitars, Bass & Drums: Songs for Survival
- "Special Guide" – from the Shelf In The Room single
- "Seasons Change" – from the Half Baked soundtrack
- "Two Faces" – from the Varsity Blues soundtrack
- "Running Knees" – from the Godzilla soundtrack
- "Rough Day" – from the Heavy Metal 2000 soundtrack
- "L.A. Woman" and "The End" – from Stoned Immaculate: The Music of The Doors

=== Music videos ===
Title
"Touch, Peel and Stand"
"The Down Town"
"Shelf in the Room"
"Enemy"
