= Days of the New (1997 album) =

Studio album by Days of the New
- Released: June 3, 1997
- Recorded: October–November 1996
- Studio: Woodland (Nashville, Tennessee)
- Genre: Post-grunge; alternative rock; acoustic rock
- Length: 72:00
- Label: Outpost
- Producer: Scott Litt

Days of the New chronology
| Days of the New (1997) | Days of the New (1999) |

Singles from Days of the New
- 1. "Touch, Peel and Stand" Released: July 1997; 2. "The Down Town" Released: March 1998; 3. "Shelf in the Room" Released: September 1998

Days of the New (also known as the Orange or Yellow album) is the debut studio album by American alternative rock band Days of the New, and the first of their three self-titled albums. The album was released on June 3, 1997, through Outpost Records.

In 2025, Lauryn Schaffner of Loudwire named the album the best post-grunge release of 1997. That same year, she said it was the band's best album.

== Production ==
The band recorded its debut album in late October and early November 1996 at Woodland Studios in Nashville, Tennessee. Drummer Matt Taul was called away from the studio during the sessions for the birth of his daughter, so session drummer Adam Turgeon filled in on some tracks.

Travis Meeks named Dead Can Dance as an inspiration while working on the album.

The last song on the album, "Cling," is a home demo that Meeks recorded on a four-track machine. The entire album is acoustic, with emphasis on guitar, and features dark melodies such as "Face of the Earth" and "Freak" as well as more up-tempo songs like "The Down Town" and "Where I Stand."

== Promotion ==
Days of the New was a success, selling 1.5 million copies worldwide. Three songs from the album were hits: "Touch, Peel and Stand," "The Down Town," and "Shelf in the Room." "Touch, Peel and Stand" was number one on Billboard's Rock Chart for 16 weeks; "The Down Town" and "Shelf in the Room" were each top 40 hits. Music videos produced for the three singles also found rotation.

Shortly after releasing the album, the band went on tour with Metallica and Jerry Cantrell in 1998. Internal problems became publicly evident, however, and soon after concluding the tour, the band split up. Todd Whitener, Matt Taul and Jesse Vest would go on to form Tantric while Meeks formed a new band under the Days of the New name.

== Critical reception ==
Professional ratings
Review scores
| Source | Rating |
|---|---|
| Addicted to Noise | Very Good |
| AllMusic | 3/5 stars |
| The Encyclopedia of Popular Music | 3/5 stars |
| Kerrang! | 4/5 stars |
| MusicHound Rock | 3/5 stars |
| Pitchfork | 2.8/10 |
| The Village Voice | C |

Reviewing for The Village Voice in December 1997, Robert Christgau was unenthusiastic about the album: "As marketing, pure genius. Looks like alt-country, no electric guitars even, yet is actually America's answer to Silverchair. And hey, it's sincere—17-year-old heartland frontman Travis Meeks really is depressed, really has immersed in Soundgarden, really does think it's deep to hook your single to the all-purpose trope 'abuse.' This is why grownups need Hanson. It's also why they need Radish."

Stephen Thomas Earliwine was more complimentary, giving the album three out of five stars. He said Meeks's vocals and lyrics were occasionally disappointing, but the album's stronger moments "prove that teenagers can rock as hard, and with as much purpose, as adults." Mike Peake of Kerrang!, who gave the album four stars out of five, stated that "the sheer songwriting class, production and the obvious musical savvy of the band makes [Days of the New] one of the most appealing and powerful debut albums for some time."

== Track listing ==
All tracks are written by Travis Meeks.

Tracks
| No. | Title | Length |
|---|---|---|
| 1. | "Shelf in the Room" | 4:44 |
| 2. | "Touch, Peel and Stand" | 4:57 |
| 3. | "Face of the Earth" | 5:17 |
| 4. | "Solitude" | 4:11 |
| 5. | "The Down Town" | 4:16 |
| 6. | "What's Left for Me?" | 5:27 |
| 7. | "Freak" | 5:23 |
| 8. | "Now" | 5:04 |
| 9. | "Whimsical" | 6:01 |
| 10. | "Where I Stand" | 5:39 |
| 11. | "How Do You Know You?" | 5:33 |
| 12. | "Cling/The Boner Track" (hidden track) | 15:27 |
| Total length: | | 72:00 |

== Outtakes and B-Sides ==
- "Independent Slaves" - Appears on the Touch, Peel and Stand single and on the Crow: Salvation soundtrack
- "Got to Be You" - Appears on the Touch, Peel and Stand single and on 2 Guitars, Bass & Drums: Songs For Survival
- "Special Guide" - Appears on the Shelf In The Room single
- "The Character/The Threat" - Appears on the Days of the New: Live VHS
- "Break You" - Played during the Fall 1997 tour
- "I Tried" Unreleased song

== Personnel ==
Adapted credits from the Days of the New booklet. Drum credits as per Meeks' official biography.

Days of the New

- Travis Meeks – lead vocals, acoustic rhythm guitar
- Todd Whitener – acoustic lead guitar, backing vocals
- Jesse Vest – bass
- Matt Taul – drums ("Touch, Peel, and Stand", "Whimsical", "Freak", "Now")

Additional musicians

- Todd Smith – keyboards
- Adam Turgeon – drums ("Shelf in the Room", "The Down Town", "Solitude", "What’s Left For Me?", "Face of the Earth", "How Do You Know You?", "Where I Stand")

Artwork

- Chris Bilheimer – art direction, illustrations, photography
- Jim Goldberg – photography

Production

- Travis Meeks – producer
- Bill Klatt – producer, engineer
- Scott Litt – producer
- Todd Smith & Chris Stone – second engineers
- Blair Wells – digital editing
- Bob Ludwig – mastering
- James Rosenthal – mixing
- Adam Green – digital editing

== Charts ==
Album

| Year | Chart | Position |
|---|---|---|
| 1997 | Top Heatseekers Charts | 1 |
| 1997 | US Billboard 200 | 54 |
| 1998 | Australian Albums Chart | 47 |
| 1998 | New Zealand Albums Chart | 1 |

Singles

| Year | Song | Chart | Position |
|---|---|---|---|
| 1997 | "Touch, Peel and Stand" | US Mainstream Rock Tracks | 1 |
| 1997 | "Touch, Peel and Stand" | US Modern Rock Tracks | 6 |
| 1998 | "Shelf in the Room" | US Mainstream Rock Tracks | 3 |
| 1998 | "Shelf in the Room" | US Modern Rock Tracks | 22 |
| 1998 | "The Down Town" | US Mainstream Rock Tracks | 1 |
| 1998 | "The Down Town" | US Modern Rock Tracks | 19 |

== Certifications ==
| Region | Certification | Certified units/sales |
|---|---|---|
| Canada (Music Canada) | Platinum | 100,000^{^} |
| New Zealand (RMNZ) | Gold | 7,500^{^} |
| United States (RIAA) | Platinum | 1,000,000^{^} |
^{^} Shipments figures based on certification alone.

== Days of the New: Live ==
On December 1, 1998, Outpost released Days of the New: Live, a VHS featuring concert footage and two music videos. The video includes numerous songs that would be released on future Days of the New albums.

=== Track listing ===
1. Fighting with Clay
2. Freak
3. Best in Life
4. Shelf in the Room
5. The Character/The Threat
6. Face of the Earth
7. Special Guide
8. How Do You Know You?
9. Touch, Peel and Stand
10. Bring Yourself
11. The Down Town
12. Touch, Peel and Stand (video)
13. Shelf in the Room (video)
