= Face to the Floor =

Single by Chevelle

from the album Hats Off to the Bull
- Released: October 10, 2011
- Genre: Alternative metal
- Length: 3:42
- Label: Epic
- Songwriters: Pete Loeffler; Sam Loeffler
- Producer: Joe Barresi

Chevelle singles chronology
"Shameful Metaphors" (2010)	"Face to the Floor" (2011)	"Hats Off to the Bull" (2012)

Music video
- "Face to the Floor" on YouTube

"Face to the Floor" is a song by American rock band Chevelle. It is the first single from the band's album, Hats Off to the Bull. According to the band, it is a "pissed off, angry song about people who got taken by the Ponzi scheme that Bernie Madoff had for all those years." "Face to the Floor" reached No. 1 on Billboard's Mainstream Rock chart, their first No. 1 single since "Vitamin R (Leading Us Along)". It was also the band's last top-ten single (to date) on the Alternative Songs chart, where it reached No. 7. The song's style has been described as a "cathartic alt-metal".

== Critical reception ==
Billboard rated "Face to the Floor" 80 out of 100, saying "Floor" delivers nearly four minutes of the cathartic alt-metal fans have come to expect from Chevelle." Liz Ramanand of Loudwire gave the song 4 out of 5 stars, praising it for its consistently "heavy, catchy guitar riffs".

== Charts ==
=== Weekly charts ===
Weekly chart performance for "Face to the Floor"
Chart (2011–2012)	Peak position
Canada Rock (Billboard)	11
US Bubbling Under Hot 100 (Billboard)	10
US Hot Rock & Alternative Songs (Billboard)	3

=== Year-end charts ===
Year-end chart performance for "Face to the Floor"
Chart (2012)	Position
US Hot Rock Songs (Billboard)	11

== Certifications ==
Certifications for "Face to the Floor"
Region	Certification	Certified units/sales
United States (RIAA)	Gold	500,000^{‡}
^{‡} Sales+streaming figures based on certification alone.
