= Neil Marshall's unrealized projects =

During his long career, British filmmaker Neil Marshall has worked on several projects which never progressed beyond the pre-production stage under his direction. Some of these projects fell in development hell, were officially canceled, were in development limbo or would see life under a different production team.

== 2000s ==
=== Outpost ===
Outpost was a planned film that Marshall announced before starting The Descent. He described the premise to be zombies terrorising an oil rig, but he placed the film on hold for the time being.

=== The Eagle's Nest ===
The Eagle's Nest was a planned film that Marshall described as a World War II action-adventure that would be a hybrid of Die Hard (1988) and The Remains of the Day (1993). He said the film was an action adventure tribute to films like Where Eagles Dare (1968) and The Eagle Has Landed (1976). The premise would be about a rescue attempt for a parachutist, Rudolf Hess, who lands in Scotland during World War II. The rescue is botched, and Hess is taken by a German unit to a country castle. He also said "It's a little bit of Where Eagles Dare, Indiana Jones, James Bond and its kind of an espionage story set during WWII but it is not really a war movie as such it's a full on action-adventure."

=== The Sword and the Fury ===
The Sword and the Fury was a planned film about a heist that takes place in medieval times. The story takes place 30 years after the death of King Arthur when his sword Excalibur is stolen. Arthur's queen Guinevere hires a band of thieves to steal it back.

=== Sherlock Holmes ===
On March 15, 2007, Marshall was set to direct Michael Johnson’s action-adventure Sherlock Holmes screenplay with Lionel Wigram producing the film, and Warner Bros. set to distribute the film, but Guy Ritchie ended up directing instead.

=== Sacrilege ===
Sacrilege was a planned film that takes place in the Old West. Marshall described the film, "It is set during the Gold Rush, a time remembered for incidents like the Donner Party. It is meant to be a pitch-black, gritty, period horror movie." The film will be themed on paranoia and isolation, and the director will draw inspiration from the 1982 film The Thing. "This is Unforgiven by way of H.P. Lovecraft, with that grim, gritty setting and a horror element nobody has seen before," Marshall said.

=== Drive ===
On March 19, 2008, Marshall was set to direct the feature film adaptation of James Sallis’ novel Drive, with Hossein Amini set to write the screenplay and Hugh Jackman attached to star and produce the film with John Palermo & Marc Platt and Universal Pictures distributing the film, which Nicolas Winding Refn ended up directing instead.

=== Predators ===
Marshall was Robert Rodriguez's second choice to direct the Predator sequel Predators in the late 2000s. Rodriguez chose Nimród Antal instead, and the film was released in 2010. Marshall later reflected, "I'd love to make a Predator movie sometime, the same way I'd like to do an Alien movie too. There's a bunch of things I'd have done differently if I was directing Predators. All things considered, I'd rather start from scratch and do a fresh take on the Predator concept, rather than do anything that's come before me."

=== Burst 3D ===
Burst 3D was a horror thriller film, first announced in October 2009, that Marshall planned to direct. The film, based on a screenplay by Gary Dauberman, would follow travellers stranded in a blizzard and being attacked by an entity that makes them spontaneously combust. The film was planned to be produced by Sam Raimi's company Ghost House Pictures.

== 2010s ==
=== The Professionals ===
In April 2010, at the time of the release of his film Centurion, Marshall signed on to direct a feature adaptation of the 1970s British series The Professionals. An undisclosed writer was also attached and then in the process of working on the script. "We want to contemporize it but keep everything that made the original great," said Marshall. "Just turn it into a real wham-bam rip-roaring adventure movie. And a really great buddy movie: these guys are like Butch and Sundance or Riggs and Murtaugh. But this is a British buddy movie, which I don't think I've seen before..." However, by March the following year, he was off the project.

=== Underground ===
In August 2010, it was reported by Deadline Hollywood that Marshall was set to direct David Cohen's script Underground, about "an ambitious young chef who ventures into the terrifying underbelly of extreme cuisine."

=== Untitled WWII-set alien invasion film ===
In March 2011, Marshall revealed that he was in the process of writing the script for an alien invasion film set during World War II. By 2024, Marshall stated in an interview that he had returned to writing the project, expressing his frustration over to how pitch it; "When you pitch that, everyone thinks it's Independence Day meets Saving Private Ryan. It's not that at all — it's more quirky and set in a small fishing village."

=== Hell Fest ===
In December 2011, it was reported by Deadline Hollywood that Marshall would next be directing the horror project Hell Fest for CBS Films and producer Gale Ann Hurd. Production was expected to begin in summer 2012, with plans for a franchise of future films. Marshall departed from the film by 2016 as result of many delays, and it was instead directed by Gregory Plotkin.

=== The Last Voyage of the Demeter ===
On May 11, 2012, Marshall was set to direct Bragi Schut Jr.'s screenplay The Last Voyage of the Demeter with Mike Medavoy, Arnold Messer, Bradley Fischer, Chris Bender, Brian Spink, Jake Weiner and J.C. Spink producing for Millennium Films, which André Øvredal would direct instead.

=== Black Widow ===
In 2014, Marshall had expressed interest in doing a solo Black Widow film for Marvel Studios.

=== Britannia TV series ===
On April 9, 2015, Paris-based financier and producer Backup Films announced its first-ever English-language TV series with Marshall's historical drama Britannia. The eight-part series, which was shopped at Cannes' Mip TV market that year, depicts the Roman conquest of Britain and the union between Boudica and Roman consul Cassius Dio against Roman emperor Claudius. Executive producing were Marshall, Elizabeth Stanley, Thomas Bliss, and creator Martha Little. It was never filmed.

=== Nightrise TV series ===
Nightrise was a planned television drama series from Marshall and Marc Helwig, developed through their Applebox Entertainment banner. It was written by David Arata and was said to be set amidst a global pandemic. In October 2015, Spike TV acquired the series. Marshall was to executive produce alongside Helwig, and direct.

== 2020s ==
=== Nightshade TV series ===
In November 2022, 108 Media signed on to finance, co-develop and produce a supernatural action series Nightshade with Marshall and Simon Uttley serving as writers/co-creators. The project was set in an 18th-century English port city visited by international traders, rogues and vagabonds. Six hour-long episodes were planned for the show, with Marshall set to direct the pilot.

=== Shrine ===
In December 2023, horror author Janine Pipe revealed via Twitter that in 2024 she would be developing a supernatural-themed script called Shrine, co-written with Marshall.

=== Dog Soldiers sequel ===
In 2024, Marshall confirmed that he had been trying to get a planned sequel to his film Dog Soldiers off the ground for the past six years, and that it was likely "dead in the water". "I've got a story hammered out, but I've not written the script yet because I want to know if we're actually making it or not first," Marshall said. "It's a good idea, and I know Kevin McKidd is on board, but everything has gone very quiet and we don't know why. We'll see."

== Offers ==
=== Pride and Prejudice and Zombies ===
On October 17, 2010, Marshall was offered to direct the feature film adaptation of Seth Grahame-Smith’s novel Pride and Prejudice and Zombies before Burr Steers was hired.
