= Outpost Firewall Pro =

Personal firewall developed by Agnitum

- Developer: Agnitum
- Final release: 9.3 (4934.708.2079) / December 1, 2015; 10 years ago
- Operating system: Windows XP and later
- Platform: IA-32
- Type: Firewall, HIPS, anti-spyware
- License: Freemium
- Website: agnitum.com

Outpost Firewall Pro is a discontinued personal firewall developed by Agnitum (founded in 1999 in St. Petersburg, Russia).

== Overview ==
Outpost Firewall Pro monitors incoming and outgoing network traffic on Windows machines. Outpost also monitors application behavior in an attempt to stop malicious software covertly infecting Windows systems. Agnitum called this technology "Component Control" and "Anti-Leak Control" (included into HIPS-based "Host Protection" module). The product also includes a spyware scanner and monitor, along with a pop-up blocker and spyware filter for Internet Explorer and Mozilla Firefox. (Outpost's web surfing security tools had included black-lists for IPs and URLs, unwanted web page element filters and ad-blocking. The technology altogether is known as "Web control".)

Version 7.5 adds new techniques to help PC users block unknown new threats before their activation:

- Removable media protection (so-called "USB Virus Protection", part of the Proactive Protection module) blocks unsigned programs set to run automatically upon the connection of a removable media.
- SmartDecision technology (so-called "Personal Virus Adviser", basis of the Proactive Protection module) facilitates decision-making process.

Version 8 introduces further improvements as well as Windows 8 compatibility and a redesigned user interface; version 8 also has extends x64 host-based intrusion-prevention system (HIPS) support.

Outpost Firewall Pro allows the user to specifically define how a PC application connects to the Internet. This is known as the "Rules Wizard" mode, or policy, and is the default behavior for the program. In this mode, Outpost Firewall Pro displays a prompt each time a new process attempts network access or when a process requests a connection that was not covered by its pre-validated rules. The idea is to let the user decide whether an application should be allowed a network connection to a specific address, port or protocol. Outpost Firewall includes pre-set rules for many popular applications. Users could optionally submit rules they had created.

First versions for Outpost Firewall Pro (1.0–4.0) allow users to create their own plugins and add other third-party plugins to meet specific needs. Later versions do not have the plugin programming interface.

== Online assistance ==
Outpost Firewall Pro users developed an unofficial web forum fed by Agnitum since 2002 to discuss product features and support. The forum is moderated by experienced senior users of Outpost Firewall Pro and offers help and support for technical advice and program assistance.

== Achievements ==
Outpost Firewall Pro's self-protection technology aims at detecting attempts to modify or disable its services or hinder program protection, and received accolades by Comparison Testers as being capable and sophisticated at detecting all known methods of disabling it without user permission. The testing site Matousec.com (performing a test-set of leak-tests to all known software including PC firewalls), consistently gives Outpost Firewall Pro its highest ratings in PC firewalls independent comparisons. Outpost Firewall Pro has more than 30 awards in 15 countries in computer media and test labs since 2002.

The product was also licensed by several security software publishers in 2003–2010: Sophos (UK, USA), Lavasoft (Sweden), Canon (Japan), Bullguard (UK), CAT-QuickHeal (India), Novell (USA), AVG (Czech Republic), Avast (Czech Republic), Proland Software (India), and others.

== Editions ==
- Outpost Firewall Pro: A shareware personal firewall with inbound-outbound PC program actions control and port stealthing plus anti-spyware and web surfing security plus HIPS engine.
- Outpost Firewall Free: A freeware version which includes a web and local PC firewall with access control and port stealthing, plus HIPS engine.
- Outpost Security Suite Pro: Includes personal firewall, anti-virus, anti-spam, web surfing security tools and HIPS. Anti-spam has been dropped from version 8 onwards as it duplicates functions built into the most popular web and PC mail clients and is thus redundant.
- Outpost Security Suite Free: Free but limited edition for Internet Security Suite features (PC firewall, anti-virus, anti-spyware, anti-spam and host intrusion prevention system HIPS).

== Criticism ==
Outpost can generate a large number of security alerts, which some experts believe will lead to an inexperienced end-user habitually dismissing all alerts, even important ones. This firewall is preferred by experienced users as Agnitum's direction is to give the end user complete control to all aspects of their system to avoid unwanted changes by malicious software, disclosure of personal information and malware. In advanced security mode, Outpost's Component Control will notify the user every time a network enabled application has a changed component and Anti-Leak Control will notify the user whenever an application performs a potentially dangerous operation such as overwriting another application's memory space. In practice this can result in such a high number of alerts that they can quickly become intrusive. To mediate this, Outpost includes the option to apply validated presets automatically, to allow for a secure configuration, and yet provide ease of use.

== Discontinuation ==
On December 9, 2015, Yandex acquired Agnitum in order to use their technology in the Yandex Browser. Valid license holders were given until January 31, 2016, to exchange their license keys for a 1-year license of Kaspersky Internet Security.

== Footnotes ==
- (Website Review and user ratings)
- Bullguard License Agreement, saying that firewall is based on the Outpost
- Sophos to use Outpost Firewall technology from Agnitum
- Novell Client Firewall was based on Outpost Pro from Agnitum
