= Outpost Recordings =

American record label (1996–2000)

- Founded: January 26, 1996; 29 years ago
- Founder: Scott Litt; Mark Williams; Andy Gershon
- Defunct: January 2000; 26 years ago
- Status: Defunct
- Distributors: Geffen Records (1996–1998); Interscope Records (1999–2000)
- Genre: Various
- Country of origin: United States
- Location: Los Angeles, California
- Official website: outpostrec.com (Archived on January 11, 1998)

Outpost Recordings was an American record label, founded in January 1996 by Scott Litt, Mark Williams and Andy Gershon. The label was launched as a joint venture with Geffen Records, who originally handled the label's marketing, promotion and distribution.

Outpost Recordings achieved its greatest commercial successes with Days of the New and The Crystal Method, but never became a financially profitable operation. After an unsuccessful pairing with Interscope Records in 1999 following Geffen's closure, the label closed down in January 2000.

== History ==
=== Formation and successes (1996–1998) ===
Outpost Recordings was launched on January 26, 1996, by producer Scott Litt, former Virgin Records A&R head Mark Williams and artist manager Andy Gershon. According to Gershon, "The reason we chose the name Outpost is our plan is to be on the frontier of what's happening in the future." In spite of its founders' backgrounds being primarily in the alternative rock genre, Williams said that the label would not specialize in any particular genre and that they only wanted to "sign artists who make music we love. Period." Prior to its official launch, Outpost signed a five-year, multi-million dollar joint-venture deal with Geffen Records, who agreed to handle the label's marketing, promotion and distribution worldwide. Shortly after its launch, Outpost signed Veruca Salt over from Geffen.

On February 23, 1996, Outpost signed its first new act, Canadian singer/songwriter Hayden. His debut album Everything I Long For, originally released in 1995, was reissued through Outpost/Geffen in May 1996 as the label's first release. The album sold moderately well in Japan and Canada (the latter where it was instead distributed by Hayden's own label, Hardwood Records) but found little success in the United States, where it had only sold 23,000 copies by April 1998. Veruca Salt's second album Eight Arms to Hold You, released on February 11, 1997, served as the label's first original release. In January 1997, Outpost signed a deal with the independent electronic breakbeat label City of Angels to distribute its releases outside of North America, where the genre was more popular. The deal also gave Outpost the ability to sign some of City of Angels' artists, most notably The Crystal Method, directly to the label.

1997 saw Outpost experience its greatest commercial successes with Days of the New's self-titled debut album and The Crystal Method's Vegas, which were certified Platinum by the Recording Industry Association of America (RIAA) in 1998 and 2007, respectively. The lead single from Days of the New's album, "Touch, Peel and Stand", stayed at number 1 on Billboard's Mainstream Rock Tracks Chart for sixteen weeks and was named the "Greatest of All Time Mainstream Rock Song" by Billboard in 2021.

=== Distributor change and closure (1999–2000) ===
Outpost never became a financially profitable operation. Following the merger between Universal Music Group and PolyGram in 1999, Geffen Records was closed and the label was left without a distributor. The label asked Zach Horowitz, UMG's COO, to be paired with MCA Records, but relations between the two labels quickly turned sour when Outpost discovered that UMG were planning to do a deal with MCA that would reduce the label's A&R budget and keep Days of the New at Interscope Records, which Williams found "unacceptable". Outpost subsequently attempted to work with Interscope, releasing two albums together in August 1999; Hot Sauce Johnson's Truck Stop Jug Hop and Day's of the New's second self-titled album. Both albums fared poorly commercially, and both Williams and Gershon felt that Interscope was a poor pairing for Outpost. According to Gershon:

"The original reason our joint venture with Geffen was successful was because they didn't put out a lot of records and they needed help in A&R. Interscope's the exact opposite. They have great A&R, and they put out a lot of albums... To be honest [...] the minute they closed down Geffen, we were living on borrowed time."

On January 15, 2000, Billboard reported that Outpost had ended its deal with UMG and would likely shut down by the month's end. As part of an agreement between the two labels, Days of the New and the Crystal Method were transferred over to Interscope, with the rest of Outpost's artists either being transferred to other UMG labels or released from their contracts. Nina Gordon's Tonight and the Rest of My Life, which had been due for release through Outpost/Interscope, was instead issued through Warner Bros. Records in June 2000. Whiskeytown's Pneumonia, which was in the process of being mixed and mastered when Outpost folded, was released through Lost Highway in May 2001.

== Former artists ==
- BMX Girl
- The Crystal Method
- Days of the New
- DJ Spooky
- Flat Duo Jets
- Hayden
- Home Grown
- Hot Sauce Johnson
- Jim Rome
- Leona Naess
- Marigold
- Nina Gordon
- Vaganza
- Veruca Salt
- Whiskeytown
