= Amaryllis (Shinedown album) =

Studio album by Shinedown
- Released: March 27, 2012
- Recorded: 2011–12
- Studio: Lightning Sound; Ocean Way (Hollywood); No Excuses; Capitol (Hollywood)
- Genre: Hard rock; post-grunge; alternative metal; alternative rock
- Length: 44:10
- Label: Atlantic; Roadrunner (Europe and Australasia only)
- Producer: Rob Cavallo

Shinedown chronology
The Sound of Madness (2008)	Amaryllis (2012)	Threat to Survival (2015)

Singles from Amaryllis
- 1. "Bully" Released: January 3, 2012; 2. "Unity" Released: March 13, 2012; 3. "Enemies" Released: July 17, 2012; 4. "I'll Follow You" Released: February 5, 2013; 5. "Adrenaline" Released: August 13, 2013; 6. "Through the Ghost" Released: March 27, 2014

Professional ratings
Aggregate scores
Source	Rating
Metacritic	47/100
Review scores
Source	Rating
About	3.5/5 stars
AllMusic	2.5/5 stars
Loudwire	4.5/5 stars
Metal Hammer Germany	6/7
Mind Equals Blown	4.5/5 stars
Powermetal	4.5/5 stars
Rolling Stone	2/5 stars
Sputnikmusic	2.5/5

Amaryllis is the fourth studio album by American rock band Shinedown. It was announced on January 3, 2012, the same day as the first single, "Bully," was released, for release by Atlantic and Roadrunner on March 27, with pre-orders opening on January 17. A music video for the song "Unity" was released on March 12. An e-book about the making of Amaryllis, titled For Your Sake: Inside the Making of Amaryllis, was released concurrently with the album.

The album was recorded at Lightning Sound Studios, Ocean Way Recording, No Excuses Studios and Capitol Studios, and was produced by Rob Cavallo, who also produced the band's previous album, The Sound of Madness. Amaryllis was released on Atlantic Records in the United States and via Roadrunner elsewhere.

Speaking about the album, Shinedown singer Brent Smith said that "During the recording [of Amaryllis], the vision of what Shinedown is and where it's going became completely clear. Amaryllis is the manifestation of that vision, the centerpiece of what Shinedown is. It reflects on everything we've done and where we're heading. It's a message of empowerment, perseverance, and inspiration that I think speaks to fans that have been with us since the beginning as well as those who are just learning about who we are and what we're about." "Adrenaline" served as the official theme song to WWE's Extreme Rules (2012). The album's second single, "Unity", was released on May 15. The album's third single, "Enemies" was used as the theme song to WWE Raw from July 25, 2016, to January 22, 2018.

The album was certified Gold by both the RIAA and Music Canada, and Silver by the British Phonographic Industry.

== Track listing ==
All tracks are written by Brent Smith and Dave Bassett except where noted

No.	Title	Length
1.	"Adrenaline"	3:26
2.	"Bully" (Smith, Zach Myers, Bassett)	4:02
3.	"Amaryllis"	4:04
4.	"Unity" (Smith, Eric Bass, Bassett)	4:12
5.	"Enemies" (Smith, Bass, Bassett)	3:08
6.	"I'm Not Alright" (Smith, Dana Calitri, Nina Ossoff, Kathy Sommer)	3:07
7.	"Nowhere Kids" (Smith, Bass, Bassett)	3:11
8.	"Miracle"	3:38
9.	"I'll Follow You" (Smith, Bass, Bassett)	3:58
10.	"For My Sake"	3:47
11.	"My Name (Wearing Me Out)"	3:36
12.	"Through the Ghost"	4:01
Total length:		44:10

Japanese bonus tracks
No.	Title	Length
13.	"Diamond Eyes (Boom-Lay Boom-Lay Boom)"	5:36
14.	"Devour" (Live from Washington State)	3:56
15.	"Diamond Eyes (Boom-Lay Boom-Lay Boom)" (Live from Washington State)	5:41
Total length:		59:23

There is also an unreleased song from the Amaryllis sessions called "The Underground".

The band announced the previously unreleased song "Atlas Falls" would be available as part of a $50 shirt bundle with all proceeds benefiting the humanitarian charity Direct Relief.

== Personnel ==
Shinedown

- Brent Smith – lead vocals
- Zach Myers – guitar, backing vocals
- Barry Kerch – drums, backing vocals on "Adrenaline"
- Eric Bass – bass, backing vocals, additional production

Additional musicians

- David Campbell – conducting, string and horn arrangements
- Dave Bassett – additional guitar, backing vocals on "Bully" and "Enemies", additional production
- Rob Cavallo – additional guitar and keyboards
- Tim Pierce – additional guitar
- Jamie Muhoberac – keyboards and piano
- West Los Angeles Children's Choir (August Bagg, Hannah "Caz" Blatt, Boyce Buchanan, Arielle Cohen, Lowell Novitch, Skylar Saltzman, Finn Snyder, Sonam KC, Andrew Steele and Mario Thomas) – choir on "Bully"
- Barbara Klaskin Silberg – choir director
- Wayne Bergeron – piccolo trumpet solo on "I'm Not Alright"
- Rick Baptist and John Furno – trumpets on "I'm Not Alright"
- Steve Becknell and Paul Klintworth – horns on "I'm Not Alright"
- Alan Kaplan and Steve Holtman – trombones on "I'm Not Alright"
- Charlie Bisharat (concertmaster), Jackie Brand, Darius Campo, Kevin Connolly, Mario Delcon, Tammy Hatwan, Gerry Hillera, Songa Lee, Natalie Leggett, Serena McKinney, Sid Page, Alyssa Park, Katia Popov, Michelle Richards, Josefina Vergara, John Wittenberg and Ken Yerke – violins on "Amaryllis", "Unity", "I'm Not Alright", "I'll Follow You" and "Through the Ghost"
- Roland Kato, Denyse Buffum, Andrew Duckles, Matt Funes and Kate Vincent – violas on "Amaryllis", "Unity", "I'm Not Alright", "I'll Follow You" and "Through the Ghost"
- Steve Richards, Paula Hochhalter, Kim Scholes, Rudy Stein and Suzie Katayama (contractor) – celli on "Amaryllis", "Unity", "I'm Not Alright", "I'll Follow You" and "Through the Ghost"
- Dave Stone, Mike Valerio, Nico Abondolo and Don Ferrone – double bass on "Amaryllis", "Unity", "I'm Not Alright", "I'll Follow You" and "Through the Ghost"

Technical personnel

- Rob Cavallo – producer
- Doug McKean – engineering
- Steve Rea, Ross Waugh, Wes Seidman, Jake Gorski, Charlie Paakkari and Bryan Morton – assistant engineering at Lightning Sound Studios, Ocean Way Recording, Capitol Studios and No Excuses Studio
- The Gyrlz (Dana Calitri, Nina Ossoff and Kathy Sommer) and Martin Briley – additional vocal and instrumental production
- Lars Fox – additional ProTools engineering
- Scott Gibson McKay – additional ProTools editing
- Chris Lord-Alge – mixing at Mix LA, Tarzana, Los Angeles, CA
- Keith Armstrong and Nik Karpen – assistant mix engineering
- Andrew Schubert and Brad Townsend – additional mix engineering
- Ted Jensen – mastering at Sterling Sound, New York, NY
- Mike Fasano and Brandon "Bear" Alanis – drum technicians
- Todd Youth and RJ Ronquillo – guitar and bass technicians
- Cheryl Jenets – production management
- Clayton Jackson and Michelle Rogel – production assistants
- Steve Robertson – A&R
- Anne DeClemente and Craig Rosen – A&R administration
- Anthony Delia – marketing
- David J. Harrigan III – art direction and design
- James Minchin III – photography
- Pamela Simon – packaging management
- Bill McGathy and Gwyther Bultman (In De Goot Entertainment) – management
- Ron Opaleski (William Morris Endeavor) – booking
- Jess Rosen – legal representation
- David Weise, Beth Sabbagh and Laurie Davis (David Weise & Associates) – business management

== Chart positions ==
Amaryllis debuted at No. 4 on the Billboard 200 with 106,000 units sold in its first week; giving Shinedown their highest first week sales and highest entry on the charts. As of October 22, 2014, Amaryllis has sold 500,000 copies in the U.S.

=== Weekly charts ===
Chart (2012)	Peak position
Austrian Albums (Ö3 Austria)	43
Canadian Albums (Billboard)	7
New Zealand Albums (RMNZ)	26
Dutch Albums (Album Top 100)	85
German Albums (Offizielle Top 100)	36
Japanese Albums (Oricon)	108
Scottish Albums (OCC)	14
Swiss Albums (Schweizer Hitparade)	28
UK Albums (OCC)	18
US Billboard 200	4
US Top Alternative Albums (Billboard)	1
US Top Hard Rock Albums (Billboard)	1
US Top Rock Albums (Billboard)	1

=== Year-end charts ===
Chart (2012)	Position
US Billboard 200	89
US Top Rock Albums (Billboard)	25

== Certifications ==
Region	Certification	Certified units/sales
Canada (Music Canada)	Gold	40,000^{‡}
United Kingdom (BPI)	Silver	60,000^{‡}
United States (RIAA)	Gold	500,000^{^}
^{^} Shipments figures based on certification alone.^{‡} Sales+streaming figures based on certification alone.
