= Bully (song) =

Single by Shinedown

from the album Amaryllis
- Released: January 3, 2012
- Studio: Cameron More; Capitol (Hollywood)
- Length: 4:01
- Label: Atlantic
- Songwriters: Brent Smith; Zach Myers; Dave Bassett
- Producer: Rob Cavallo

Shinedown singles chronology
"Diamond Eyes (Boom-Lay Boom-Lay Boom)" (2010)	"Bully" (2012)	"Unity" (2012)

Music video
- "Bully" on YouTube

"Bully" is the lead single from American rock band Shinedown's fourth studio album, Amaryllis. It is best known for appearing on the soundtrack for the 2012 EA Sports game NHL 13.

== Meaning ==
Speaking to Rolling Stone, Shinedown front man Brent Smith discussed the lyrics of the song as "about not feeling like you can't stand up for yourself and take back your self respect if you feel as if someone is belittling you or trying to push you around. The song is not condoning violence. What it is condoning is survival. I don't think that anyone should ever have their self-respect or their dignity taken from them."

He also mentioned that his father had instructed him on how to defend himself against bullies. "When I was ten years old, my dad took me to the garage and put a pair of boxing gloves on me and said, 'I don't ever want it to come to this, but you need to learn how to fight.' And I got my butt kicked sometimes, but I always stood up for myself. By nature I've just never backed down from what I believed in, and I'll be damned if I'm going to let someone push me around. It's the same thing with my family, too. I wouldn't let someone come into my house and mess with my girlfriend or my son."

== Music video ==
The official video premiered on the band's YouTube channel on March 6, 2012. The video was directed by Darren Doane, who previously directed the video for "Sound of Madness".

== The Ohio State University Marching and Athletic bands ==
A version of "Bully" was arranged by John Brennan for the 2012 football season for the Ohio State University Marching and Athletic bands. It is played as a pep song by the marching band at football games and by the athletic band at basketball (and hockey) games.

== Charts ==
=== Weekly charts ===
Weekly chart performance for "Bully"
Chart (2012)	Peak position
Canada Rock (Billboard)	32
Mexico Ingles Airplay (Billboard)	44
UK Rock & Metal (Official Charts)	11
US Billboard Hot 100	94
US Hot Rock & Alternative Songs (Billboard)	3

=== Year-end charts ===
Year-end chart performance for "Bully"
Chart (2012)	Position
US Hot Rock Songs (Billboard)	16

== Certifications ==
Certifications for "Bully"
Region	Certification	Certified units/sales
United States (RIAA)	Gold	500,000^{‡}
^{‡} Sales+streaming figures based on certification alone.
