= Unity (Shinedown song) =

Single by Shinedown

from the album Amaryllis
- Released: March 13, 2012
- Studio: Ocean Way (Los Angeles); Capitol (Hollywood)
- Length: 4:12
- Label: Atlantic
- Songwriters: Brent Smith; Dave Bassett; Eric Bass
- Producer: Rob Cavallo

Shinedown singles chronology
"Bully" (2012)	"Unity" (2012)	"Enemies" (2012)

Music video
- "Unity" on YouTube

"Unity" is the second single from American rock band Shinedown's fourth studio album, Amaryllis.

== Release ==
The song was released on March 13, 2012.

== Music video ==
On the same day as the release of the official single, the official video premiered on the band's YouTube channel. The video follows a girl taking pictures of people across town. At the end of the song, the pictures resemble two hands, each of a different color.

== Charts ==
=== Weekly charts ===
Weekly chart performance for "Unity"
Chart (2012)	Peak position
Canada Rock (Billboard)	37
US Hot Rock & Alternative Songs (Billboard)	9

=== Year-end charts ===
Year-end chart performance for "Unity"
Chart (2012)	Position
US Hot Rock Songs (Billboard)	28
