= Southern Outpost =

- Origin: Sydney, NSW, Australia
- Genres: Electro music
- Years active: 10
- Labels: Southern Outpost
- Members: The Sentinel, Agent Patrick, shapeShiftr, Miss Memory, kloc, G.I.V., DJ K1, DJ Godfather, Dcast Dynamics, Scape One, dynArec, bvdub
- Website: www.southernoutpost.com

Southern Outpost is an independent electronic Record label that was started in Sydney, Australia, in 1998 but is now based in San Francisco, United States.

The labels main musical focus is the genre of electro music, having released music from such artists as DJ K1 (from Aux 88), DJ Godfather, Scape One, Dcast Dynamics, dynArec among others.

== Discography ==
| Cat # | Artist | Title |
|---|---|---|
| SO-001 | Southern Outpost | Setting The Agenda |
| SO-002 | Southern Outpost | Boogie Down 313 |
| SO-002.5 | Various | Boogie Down Detroit Remixes |
| SO-004 | ShapeShifter/The Sentinel | +612 |
| SO-005 | DJ-K1 | From Detroit to the Outback |
| SO-006 | Shadow People | Secret Society |
| SO-008 | Southern Outpost | Source Code |
| SO-009 | The Sentinel/Miss Memory | Electric Shock |
| SO-010 | The Sentinel | Trust No One |
| SO-011 | dynArec | Yellow Trigger |
| SO-012 | Scape One | Unstablebeatprotoncharacteristics |
| SO-014 | Dcast Dynamics | Trans-Migration EP |
| SOSP-001 | Bvdub | Monuments To Oblivion (cassette) |
| SOSP-001.5 | Bvdub | Monuments To Oblivion (12") |
