= Travis Meeks =

American singer-songwriter

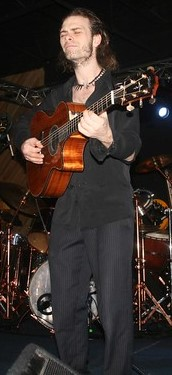
- Travis Meeks performing with Days of the New in 2009

Background information
- Born: Travis Shane Meeks; April 27, 1979 (age 47); Jeffersonville, Indiana
- Origin: Charlestown, Indiana
- Years active: 1995–2018
- Labels: Outpost; Geffen; Interscope
- Formerly of: Days of the New
- Website: travismeeks.com

Travis Shane Meeks (born April 27, 1979) is an American musician and the lead singer, guitarist and songwriter for acoustic rock band Days of the New. At age 17, Meeks was signed to Geffen Records, and from 1997 to 2001 his band of rotating musicians experienced mainstream success with three studio albums.

== Early life and career ==
Meeks was born on April 27, 1979, in Jeffersonville, Indiana. His parents divorced when he was two, and he lived with his grandmother and father. Meeks' father was a musician. At a young age, he began playing guitar and wrote songs and performed covers by age 8. Between ages 11 to 15, he went to various rehabilitation centers and a year in special schooling. During that time, Meeks formed an experimental rock band called Bad Dreemz which included Jesse Vest and Mat Taul. They then formed Dead Reckoning, which was a heavy metal band that sounded similar to Pantera.

In 1995, Meeks moved to Louisville, and Dead Reckoning changed its name to Days of the New as well as its genre to an acoustic rock, post-grunge style. Regarding that era, Meeks stated, "I went through paranoia and acid trips, separation from the mind and body... That's where my spiritual journey begins."

== Days of the New ==
At the age of 17, Meeks and fellow teenage band members Mat Taul, Todd Whitener and Jesse Vest were signed to a major record label. In 1997, they released their widely successful self-titled Yellow album that included the single, "Touch, Peel and Stand." The song rose to #1 on the Billboard Mainstream Rock Tracks chart and became the group's signature piece. Opening slots on tour with Jerry Cantrell and Metallica further exposed the band to fans around the country. Days of the New then set out on a headlining tour that lasted until a stop in Dallas, Texas after which Meeks left the tour and the remaining shows were canceled amid conflicting explanations for his departure.

As of 2008, Meeks had standing invitations to perform at the Ryman Auditorium in Nashville as well as to front the Boston Pops Orchestra. He has referred to himself as a "maestro" due to his "self-taught mastery" of the acoustic guitar and incorporation of classical sounds into his music.

Leaks of unreleased material took place from 2006 to 2020. In 2020, previously unreleased Days of the New material was leaked anonymously via YouTube, including a majority of the Days of the New Presents Tree Colors album under the color Rainbow; demo material from studio sessions in 2002 and 2003 making up the unreleased fourth "Purple" album; all of the material from Meeks' early metal band Dead Reckoning; an unreleased metal split from 2002 Not Of This World under the color chrome, which consisted of the "Red" lineup and local collaborating musician David "Sailor" Bryant of 16 Bones; and a 2014 EP entitled Aqua Marine Shuttle under the color blue.

== Personal life ==
Travis has Asperger syndrome and considers this a factor in some of his personal problems, while still being largely content. His life and career have been plagued by substance abuse and conflict with band members.

Meeks has two daughters from previous relationships. His first daughter (who was later put up for adoption) was born in 1994 from his relationship with his then-girlfriend Amy. His second daughter was born November 11, 2004, with his then-girlfriend, Karen.

In 2008, Meeks maintained sobriety and promoted his forthcoming comeback album, Days of the New Presents Tree Colors, produced under his independent label, Days of the New Productions. However, lack of distribution and finances as a result of the IRS seizing his royalties continually delayed the albums' official release. Meeks continued to be plagued by personal issues. After finding the body of his friend and former Alice in Chains bassist Mike Starr in March 2011, he experienced a divorce in 2012, which prompted a one-year hiatus. This was followed by the death of Meeks' father, Gary Lee Meeks, aged 57, on November 15, 2013.

Meeks reunited with his original Days of the New bandmates for the Full Circle reunion tour in 2014, but the endeavor came undone allegedly due to Meeks' substance issues. On October 10 that year, he was arrested in Portland, Maine, on a warrant for failing to appear in court after being charged with possession of a hypodermic needle. These events prompted him to relapse on methamphetamine in 2015 and spend a year in prison during 2016. After being released, Meeks made appearances on social media voicing his philosophy, only to be arrested in 2017 for charges of burglary, fleeing or evading police on foot, public intoxication charges and possession of a controlled substance.

In 2020, he was arrested for disorderly conduct, failure to obey a police officer, and resisting arrest.

== In other media ==
In September 2000, Meeks performed with The Doors on VH1 Storytellers and covered their magnum opus, "The End." His cover was well received, as The Doors would not allow anyone else to cover the song. Travis also was enthusiastically offered an audition by then ex-members of Guns N' Roses to be the vocalist and frontman of Velvet Revolver in 2001; however, his creative differences as well as his predicament with addiction resulted in them declining Meeks. Scott Weiland of Stone Temple Pilots would front Velvet Revolver.

In April 2005, Meeks was showcased in an episode of A&E's TV series Intervention, which was filmed in February that year. Meeks' addiction to methamphetamine was one of the two subjects for this episode. He decided to go to rehab at Cirque Lodge in Provo, Utah, but the episode ends with Meeks checking out early after 73 days. After a period of relapsing, he remained sober since September 19, 2005 until a brief relapse in September 2007.

In an online interview with Meeks, licensed clinical counselor and blogger Stephen Borgman described Meeks' Asperger syndrome and included many descriptions by Meeks himself. In this way, Meeks stated that he had "lived with intense shame and the feeling of extreme inadequacy. Everything I felt I did was wrong and that I could do nothing right. I wasn't diagnosed with Asperger's Syndrome until 2005. […] Thanks to my father, Gary Meeks, he knew I was different and tried to protect me from the vultures of punishment. I felt severely punished anyway by the way I felt when I was removed from my comfort zones such as putting me in school."

== Musical style and influences ==
He favors acoustic guitar over electric, once citing:

"Acoustic guitars are more musical. They're not all covered up by different sounds and distortions and stuff. Of course we put distortion on our guitars, but I like to go make campfires and sit out by the water, and you can't do that with an electric guitar. Each acoustic guitar has its own soul; it seems way more natural to play than electric."

== Discography ==
- With Lennon Murphy - My Beautiful (feat. Travis Meeks, single from the I Am album) and Damaged Goods (LP, credited as one of the bassists)
