= Mainstream Rock Airplay =

Music chart in Billboard magazine

Mainstream Rock Airplay is a music chart published by Billboard magazine that ranks the most-played songs on mainstream rock radio stations in the United States. It is an administrative category that combines the "active rock" and "heritage rock" formats. The chart was launched in March 1981 as Rock Albums & Top Tracks. The name changed multiple times afterwards: first to Top Rock Tracks, then to Album Rock Tracks, then to Mainstream Rock, and finally to its current in 2021. The first number-one song on this chart was "I Can't Stand It" by Eric Clapton on March 21, 1981.

== History ==
The "Rock Albums & Top Tracks" charts were introduced in the issue of Billboard that the parent company published on March 21, 1981. The 50-slot based and 60-slot based positional charts ranked airplay on album rock type radio stations in the United States. Because album-oriented rock stations often focused on playing tracks from entire albums rather than specifically released singles, these charts were designed to measure the airplay of any and all tracks from an album, regardless of context. Rock Albums was a survey of the top albums on American rock radio, while Top Tracks listed the top individual songs being played. Mike Harrison of Billboard explained that when major artists release albums, more than one song from the album can become popular at the same time. The first number-one song on the Top Tracks chart was "I Can't Stand It" by Eric Clapton. "I Can't Stand It" was from Clapton's album Another Ticket with its single having the track "Black Rose" on its alternate side.

On September 15, 1984, the Rock Albums chart was discontinued and Top Tracks was renamed Top Rock Tracks. It reduced from a 60-song tally to 50 songs on October 20, 1984, following a major revamp to the magazine. Coinciding with an increase in its reporting panel of album rock stations in the United States, the name of the chart was changed again with the issue dated April 12, 1986, to Album Rock Tracks.

On November 23, 1991, instead of reporting panels, Billboard changed its methodology of measuring airplay by using monitored airplay as provided by Nielsen Broadcast Data Systems to compile many of its charts. As a result, this data showed that many songs could spend months to over a year on the Album Rock Tracks chart. Billboard decided to drop to a 40-position chart on the week of June 27, 1992 (still its current format), and songs that fell out of the top 20 and after spending 20 weeks on the chart were moved to a new 10-position recurrent chart.

To differentiate between classic and alternative album rock radio formats, Billboard changed the name of the chart to Mainstream Rock Tracks beginning with issue dated April 13, 1996. The Mainstream Rock Tracks chart did not appear in the print edition of Billboard from its issue dated August 2, 2003, being accessible only through the magazine's subscription-based website, Billboard.biz. In late 2013, the chart was reintroduced to its primary website and magazine.

When R&R ceased publication in June 2009, Billboard incorporated its rock charts, Active Rock and Heritage Rock into its own publication. The radio station reporters of the two charts combine to make up the Mainstream Rock chart. In the United States, active rock stations concentrate on current hits over classic rock standards while heritage rock stations put a greater emphasis on classic rock with a few newer tracks mixed in. The individual Active Rock and Heritage Rock components were discontinued by Billboard at the end of November 2013, due to a growing lack of difference between the two charts.

To celebrate the 40th anniversary of the chart, in June 2021, Billboard released two charts ranking the top songs and artists in the history of the chart. "Touch, Peel and Stand" by Days of the New was the number-one song on the Greatest of All Time Mainstream Rock Songs and Shinedown was named the number-one artist on the ranking of Greatest of All Time Mainstream Rock Artists. The current number-one song on the chart is "Happy Feels Like" by Ninth Key.

== Chart achievements ==
=== Artists with the most number-one songs ===
These are the artists with the most songs that topped the Mainstream Rock chart.

Songs	Artist	References
24	Shinedown	
21	Three Days Grace	
18	Five Finger Death Punch	
17	Foo Fighters	
14	Metallica	
13	Van Halen	
13	Godsmack	
13	Disturbed	
13	Linkin Park	
13	Papa Roach	
13	Volbeat	

=== Artists with the most charted songs ===
Acts who have scored the most charted songs on the Mainstream Rock chart.

Songs	Artist	Reference
51	U2	
48	Pearl Jam	
48	Tom Petty and the Heartbreakers	
47	Van Halen	
46	John Mellencamp	
44	Aerosmith	
44	Foo Fighters	
43	Metallica	
42	Rush	
41	Ozzy Osbourne	
41	Papa Roach	

=== Artists with the most top-ten songs ===
Songs	Artist	Reference
36	Shinedown	
36	Foo Fighters	
33	Five Finger Death Punch	
29	Godsmack	
29	Papa Roach	
28	Disturbed	
28	Metallica	
28	Three Days Grace	
28	Tom Petty and the Heartbreakers	
26	Pearl Jam	
26	Seether	
26	Van Halen	

=== Acts who have reached number one in at least three decades ===
==== Four decades ====
Metallica (1990s, 2000s, 2010s, 2020s)

==== Three decades ====
AC/DC (1990s, 2000s, 2020s)
Aerosmith (1980s, 1990s, 2000s)
Alice in Chains (1990s, 2000s, 2010s)
Breaking Benjamin (2000s, 2010s, 2020s)
Chevelle (2000s, 2010s, 2020s)
Disturbed (2000s, 2010s, 2020s)
Foo Fighters (2000s, 2010s, 2020s)
Godsmack (2000s, 2010s, 2020s)
Green Day (2000s, 2010s, 2020s)
Linkin Park (2000s, 2010s, 2020s)
Nickelback (2000s, 2010s, 2020s)
The Offspring (1990s, 2010s, 2020s)
Ozzy Osbourne (2000s, 2010s, 2020s)
Papa Roach (2000s, 2010s, 2020s)
Red Hot Chili Peppers (1990s, 2000s, 2010s)
Seether (2000s, 2010s, 2020s)
Shinedown (2000s, 2010s, 2020s)
Staind (2000s, 2010s, 2020s)
Theory of a Deadman (2000s, 2010s, 2020s)
Three Days Grace (2000s, 2010s, 2020s)

=== Artists with the most consecutive number-one songs ===
Songs	Artist	Reference
14	Five Finger Death Punch	
8	Shinedown	
7	Disturbed	
6	Papa Roach	
5	Godsmack	
5	Three Days Grace	
5	The Pretty Reckless	

=== Artists with the most cumulative weeks at number one ===
Total cumulative weeks	Artist	Reference
106	Three Days Grace	
93	Shinedown	
70	Metallica	
62	Foo Fighters	
61	Disturbed	
53	3 Doors Down	
52	Nickelback	
50	Seether	
47	Collective Soul	
47	Godsmack	

=== Albums With the Most Weeks at #1 ===
Albums whose singles have spent at least 15 weeks at #1 on the Mainstream Rock charts

Total cumulative weeks	Album	Year	Weeks at #1	Singles	Artist	Reference
33	The Better Life	2000	9	"Kryptonite"	3 Doors Down	
33	The Better Life	2000	21	"Loser"	3 Doors Down	
33	The Better Life	2000	3	"Duck and Run"	3 Doors Down	
27	One-X	2006	7	"Animal I Have Become"	Three Days Grace	
27	One-X	2006	13	"Pain"	Three Days Grace	
27	One-X	2006	7	"Never Too Late"	Three Days Grace	
26	Days of the New	1997	16	"Touch, Peel, and Stand"	Days of the New	
26	Days of the New	1997	10	"The Down Town"	Days of the New	
23	The Southern Harmony and Musical Companion	1992	11	"Remedy"	The Black Crowes	
23	The Southern Harmony and Musical Companion	1992	2	"Sting Me"	The Black Crowes	
23	The Southern Harmony and Musical Companion	1992	4	"Thorn in My Pride"	The Black Crowes	
23	The Southern Harmony and Musical Companion	1992	6	"Hotel Illness"	The Black Crowes	
21	Human Clay	1999	17	"Higher"	Creed	
21	Human Clay	1999	4	"With Arms Wide Open"	Creed	
21	Life Starts Now	2009	11	"Break"	Three Days Grace	
21	Life Starts Now	2009	5	"The Good Life"	Three Days Grace	
21	Life Starts Now	2009	5	"World So Cold"	Three Days Grace	
20	Break the Cycle	2001	20	"It's Been Awhile"	Staind	
20	Contraband	2004	11	"Fall to Pieces"	Velvet Revolver	
20	Contraband	2004	9	"Slither"	Velvet Revolver	
19	Silver Side Up	2001	13	"How You Remind Me"	Nickelback	
19	Silver Side Up	2001	3	"Too Bad"	Nickelback	
19	Silver Side Up	2001	3	"Never Again"	Nickelback	
18	Hail to the King	2013	11	"Hail to the King"	Avenged Sevenfold	
18	Hail to the King	2013	7	"Shepherd of Fire"	Avenged Sevenfold	
17	Away From the Sun	2002	17	"When I'm Gone"	3 Doors Down	
17	When Legends Rise	2018	5	"Bulletproof"	Godsmack	
17	When Legends Rise	2018	5	"When Legends Rise"	Godsmack	
17	When Legends Rise	2018	2	"Under Your Scars"	Godsmack	
17	When Legends Rise	2018	5	"Unforgettable"	Godsmack	
17	American Idiot	2004	14	"Boulevard of Broken Dreams"	Green Day	
17	American Idiot	2004	3	"Holiday"	Green Day	
17	Come Clean	2001	10	"Blurry"	Puddle of Mudd	
17	Come Clean	2001	6	"Drift and Die"	Puddle of Mudd	
17	Come Clean	2001	1	"She Hates Me"	Puddle of Mudd	
17	The Sound of Madness	2008	10	"Second Chance"	Shinedown	
17	The Sound of Madness	2008	3	"Sound of Madness"	Shinedown	
17	The Sound of Madness	2008	1	"The Crow and the Butterfly"	Shinedown	
17	The Sound of Madness	2008	3	"Diamond Eyes (Boom-Lay Boom-Lay Boom)"	Shinedown	
17	Purple	1994	2	"Vasoline"	Stone Temple Pilots	
17	Purple	1994	15	"Interstate Love Song"	Stone Temple Pilots	
17	Achtung Baby	1991	12	"Mysterious Ways"	U2	
17	Achtung Baby	1991	2	"One"	U2	
17	Achtung Baby	1991	3	"Even Better than the Real Thing"	U2	
16	Black Gives Way to Blue	2009	8	"Check My Brain"	Alice in Chains	
16	Black Gives Way to Blue	2009	8	"Your Decision"	Alice in Chains	
16	Sonic Highways	2013	13	"Something from Nothing"	Foo Fighters	
16	Sonic Highways	2013	3	"Congregation"	Foo Fighters	
16	72 Seasons	2023	11	"Lux Æterna"	Metallica	
16	72 Seasons	2023	2	"72 Seasons"	Metallica	
16	72 Seasons	2023	1	"Too Far Gone?"	Metallica	
16	72 Seasons	2023	2	"Screaming Suicide"	Metallica	
16	Amaryllis	2012	12	"Bully"	Shinedown	
16	Amaryllis	2012	4	"Unity"	Shinedown	
15	Collective Soul	1995	9	"December"	Collective Soul	
15	Collective Soul	1995	4	"The World I Know"	Collective Soul	
15	Collective Soul	1995	2	"Where the River Flows"	Collective Soul	
15	Dosage	1999	15	"Heavy"	Collective Soul	
15	Evolution	2018	8	"Are You Ready"	Disturbed	
15	Evolution	2018	3	"A Reason to Fight"	Disturbed	
15	Evolution	2018	4	"No More"	Disturbed	
15	Transit of Venus	2012	13	"Chalk Outline"	Three Days Grace	
15	Transit of Venus	2012	1	"The High Road"	Three Days Grace	
15	Transit of Venus	2012	1	"Misery Loves My Company"	Three Days Grace	

=== Songs with the most weeks on the chart ===
These are the songs that have spent at least one year (52 weeks) on the Mainstream Rock chart.

Number of weeks	Song	Artist	Reference
62	"So Cold"	Breaking Benjamin	
56	"Cold"	Crossfade	
56	"Hemorrhage (In My Hands)"	Fuel	
55	"Headstrong"	Trapt	
53	"Loser"	3 Doors Down	
53	"Awake"	Godsmack	
52	"Wasteland"	10 Years	
52	"Paralyzer"	Finger Eleven	
52	"Remedy"	Seether	
52	"Life Is Beautiful"	Sixx: A.M.	

=== Songs with ten or more weeks at number one ===
Number of weeks	Song	Artist	Years	Reference
21	"Loser"	3 Doors Down	2000–2001	
20	"It's Been Awhile"	Staind	2001	
17	"Higher"	Creed	1999–2000	
17	"When I'm Gone"	3 Doors Down	2002–2003	
16	"Touch, Peel and Stand"	Days of the New	1997	
15	"Interstate Love Song"	Stone Temple Pilots	1994	
15	"Heavy"	Collective Soul	1999	
14	"So Far Away"	Staind	2003	
14	"Boulevard of Broken Dreams"	Green Day	2005	
14	"Fake It"	Seether	2007–2008	
14	"Inside the Fire"	Disturbed	2008	
13	"Start Me Up"	The Rolling Stones	1981	
13	"How You Remind Me"	Nickelback	2001	
13	"Figured You Out"	Nickelback	2004	
13	"Pain"	Three Days Grace	2006–2007	
13	"Chalk Outline"	Three Days Grace	2012	
13	"Something from Nothing"	Foo Fighters	2014–2015	
12	"Mysterious Ways"	U2	1991–1992	
12	"Like a Stone"	Audioslave	2003	
12	"Save Me"	Shinedown	2005–2006	
12	"Dani California"	Red Hot Chili Peppers	2006	
12	"Face to the Floor"	Chevelle	2011–2012	
12	"Bully"	Shinedown	2012	
11	"Remedy"	The Black Crowes	1992	
11	"Turn the Page"	Metallica	1999	
11	"Fall to Pieces"	Velvet Revolver	2004	
11	"Break"	Three Days Grace	2009–2010	
11	"Hail to the King"	Avenged Sevenfold	2013	
11	"Lux Æterna"	Metallica	2022–2023	
10	"Lightning Crashes"	Live	1995	
10	"The Down Town"	Days of the New	1998	
10	"Scar Tissue"	Red Hot Chili Peppers	1999	
10	"Blurry"	Puddle of Mudd	2002	
10	"Second Chance"	Shinedown	2008–2009	
10	"Country Song"	Seether	2011	

== See also ==
- Classic rock formats
- List of Billboard Mainstream Rock number-one songs of the 2020s
