= Bad Wolves discography =

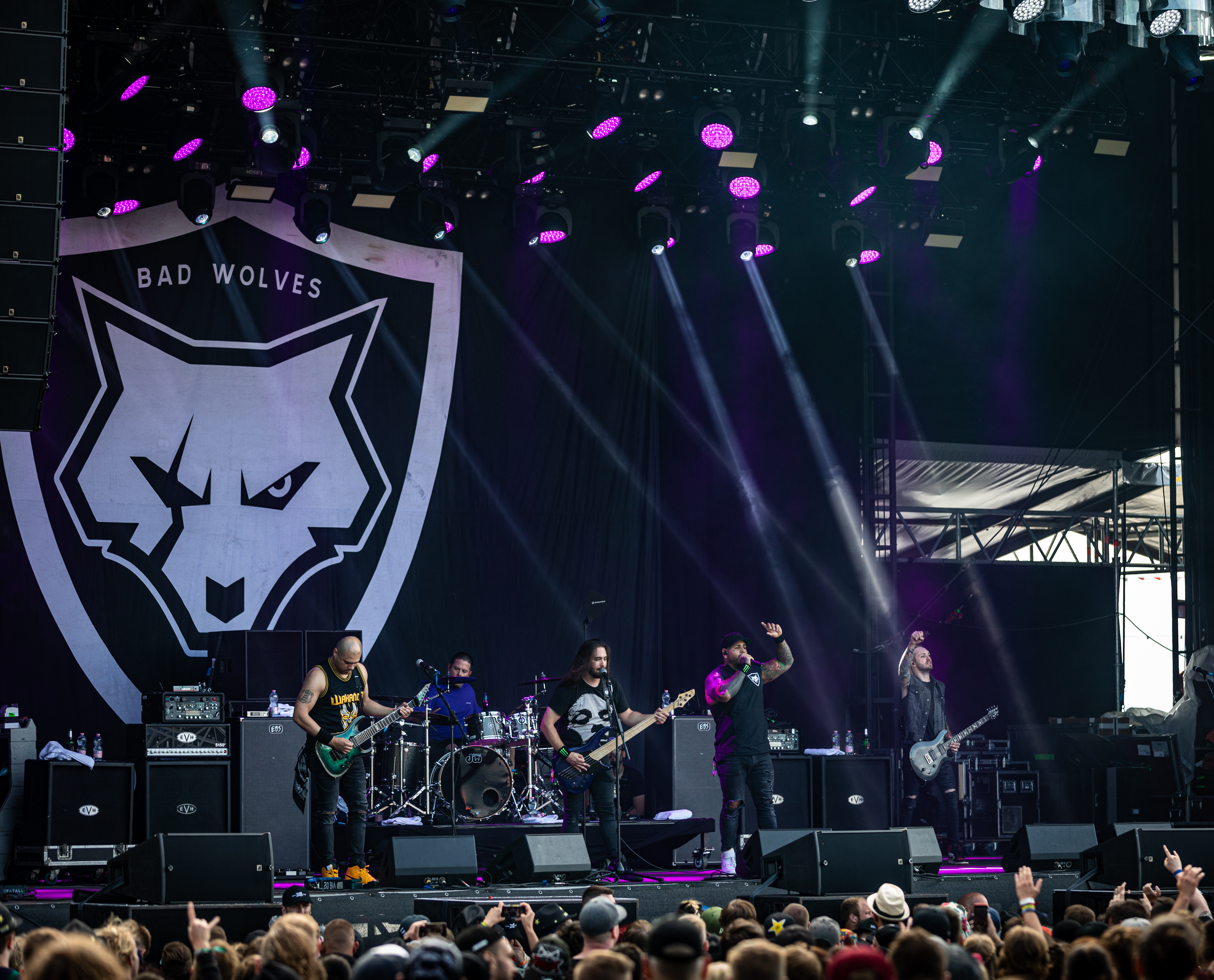
- Studio albums: 4
- EPs: 3
- Singles: 8
- Music videos: 11

Bad Wolves is an American heavy metal band formed in 2017. The band has three studio albums in its discography, Disobey (2018), N.A.T.I.O.N. (2019) and Dear Monsters (2021), though they have found more fame with their singles. Initially releasing a cover of the Cranberries' 1994 hit "Zombie", that was certified platinum in the US, the band proceeded to find further success with a number of songs topping the Billboard Mainstream Rock songs chart, including "Remember When", "Killing Me Slowly", and "Sober".

== Studio albums ==
List of albums, with selected chart positions and certifications
| Title | Album details | Peak chart positions | | | | | | | | | | Certifications |
| Title | Album details | US | AUS | AUT | BEL (FL) | CAN | FRA | GER | NZ Heat. | SCO | SWI | Certifications |
|---|---|---|---|---|---|---|---|---|---|---|---|---|
| Disobey | Released: May 11, 2018; Label: Eleven Seven; Format: CD, digital download | 23 | 9 | 39 | 126 | 23 | 89 | 55 | 9 | 51 | 24 | MC: Gold |
| N.A.T.I.O.N. | Released: October 25, 2019; Label: Eleven Seven; Format: CD, digital download | 78 | 46 | 44 | — | — | — | 60 | — | 88 | 63 | |
| Dear Monsters | Released: October 29, 2021; Label: Eleven Seven; Format: CD, digital download | — | — | — | — | — | — | 94 | — | — | 83 | |
| Die About It | Released: November 3, 2023; Label: Eleven Seven; Format: CD, digital download | — | — | — | — | — | — | — | — | — | — | |
"—" denotes a single that failed to chart or was not released to that territory.

=== Extended plays ===
List of extended plays
| Title | Album details | Certifications |
|---|---|---|
| False Flags, Volume One | Release date: March 23, 2018; Label: Eleven Seven Music | MC: Gold |
| False Flags, Volume Two | Release date: April 20, 2018; Label: Eleven Seven Music | |
| Zombie EP | Release date: May 4, 2018; Label: Eleven Seven Music | |
| Sacred Kiss | Release date: July 29, 2022; Label: Better Noise Music | |

== Singles ==
=== 2010s ===
List of singles, with selected chart positions, showing year released and album name
| Title | Year | Peak chart positions | | | | | | | | | | | Certifications | Album |
| Title | Year | US | US Alt. | US Main. Rock | US Rock | AUS | CAN | CAN Rock | FRA | SCO | SWI | SWE | Certifications | Album |
|---|---|---|---|---|---|---|---|---|---|---|---|---|---|---|
| "Zombie" | 2018 | 54 | 26 | 1 | 5 | 26 | 47 | 7 | 7 | 28 | 48 | 94 | RIAA: 3× Platinum; ARIA: Gold; BPI: Gold; GLF: Platinum; MC: 5× Platinum; RMNZ: Platinum; SNEP: Gold | Disobey |
| "Hear Me Now" (original or featuring Diamante) | 2018 | — | — | 2 | 25 | — | — | 45 | — | — | — | — | RIAA: Gold; MC: Platinum | Disobey |
| "Remember When" | 2018 | — | — | 1 | 22 | — | — | — | — | — | — | — | RIAA: Gold | Disobey |
| "Killing Me Slowly" | 2019 | — | — | 1 | 14 | — | — | — | — | — | — | — | MC: Gold | N.A.T.I.O.N. |
| "Sober" | 2019 | — | — | 1 | 21 | — | — | — | — | — | — | — | | N.A.T.I.O.N. |
"—" denotes a single that failed to chart or was not released to that territory.

=== 2020s ===
List of singles, with selected chart positions, showing year released and album name
| Title | Year | Peak chart positions | | | | Album |
| Title | Year | US Airplay | US Hot Hard Rock | US Main. Rock | CZ | Album |
|---|---|---|---|---|---|---|
| "Learn to Walk Again" | 2020 | 26 | 14 | 10 | — | N.A.T.I.O.N. |
| "Lifeline" | 2021 | 9 | 8 | 3 | — | Dear Monsters |
| "If Tomorrow Never Comes" (original or with Spencer Charnas) | 2021 | 15 | 18 | 2 | — | Dear Monsters |
| "Legends Never Die" | 2023 | 17 | 17 | 2 | 50 | Die About It |
| "Jolene" (original or featuring Dolly Parton) | 2026 | — | — | 20 | — | |
"—" denotes a single that failed to chart or was not released to that territory.

=== Promotional singles ===
List of promotional singles, showing year released and album name
| Title | Year | Peak chart positions | Album |
| Title | Year | US Hard Rock Digi. | Album |
|---|---|---|---|
| "Learn to Live" | 2017 | — | Disobey |
| "Toast to the Ghost" | 2017 | — | Disobey |
| "I'll Be There" | 2019 | — | N.A.T.I.O.N. |
| "Crying Game" | 2019 | 6 | N.A.T.I.O.N. |
| "House of Cards" | 2021 | — | Dear Monsters |
| "The Body" | 2022 | — | Sacred Kiss EP |
| "Bad Friend" | 2023 | — | Die About It |
| "Die About It" | 2023 | — | Die About It |
| "Knife" | 2024 | — | Non-album singles |
| "Hungry for Life" (original or featuring Chris Daughtry) | 2024 | — | Die About It |
| "Paint It Red" | 2026 | — | Non-album single |
"—" denotes a single that failed to chart or was not released to that territory.

== Music videos ==
| Title | Year | Director | Ref. |
|---|---|---|---|
| "Learn to Live" | 2017 | Orie McGinness | |
| "Zombie" | 2018 | Wayne Isham | |
| "Hear Me Now" (featuring Diamante) | 2018 | Ben Guzman | |
| "Remember When" | 2018 | Wayne Isham | |
| "No Masters" | 2018 | Randy Edwards | |
| "I'll Be There" | 2019 | Bryan Ramirez | |
| "Killing Me Slowly" | 2019 | Nick Peterson | |
| "Sober" | 2020 | Nick Peterson | |
| "Learn to Walk Again" | 2020 | Unknown | |
| "Lifeline" | 2021 | Bobby Hanaford | |
| "If Tomorrow Never Comes" | 2021 | Unknown | |
| "If Tomorrow Never Comes" (featuring Spencer Charnas) | 2022 | Timmy Carhart | |
| "Sacred Kiss" (featuring Aaron Pauley) | 2022 | Ryan Owens | |
| "Mama, I'm Coming Home" | 2022 | Wombat Fire | |
| "Bad Friend" | 2023 | Wombat Fire | |
| "Legends Never Die" | 2023 | Wombat Fire | |
| "Die About It" | 2023 | Wombat Fire | |
| "Hungry For Life" (featuring Chris Daughtry) | 2024 | Unknown | |
| "Paint It Red" | 2026 | Evan Aparicio | |
| "Jolene" (feat. Dolly Parton) | 2026 | Michael Lombardi | |
