= 2021 in rock music =

This article summarizes the events related to rock music for the year of 2021.

== Notable events ==
=== January ===
- Bruce Springsteen and the Foo Fighters are among the artists who perform at the US Presidential Inauguration of Joe Biden. New Radicals reunite for the first time in 22 years to perform their song "You Get What You Give".
- In a run that starts in December, Foo Fighters single "Shame Shame" tops the Billboard Mainstream Rock songs chart, and stays there for 6 consecutive weeks.
- UK musician Steven Wilson (of Porcupine Tree) released his sixth studio The Future Bites on 29 January 2021. It was originally scheduled for June 2020, but the COVID-19 pandemic prevented Wilson from carrying the albums full high concept premise, which included an extensive and intricate live performance. The album debuts in the top five of six different European national charts, but only hits 192nd on the US Billboard 200 top albums chart.
- Bad Wolves part ways with vocalist Tommy Vext after tensions arise between Vext and the rest of the band, management, and label on political and social issues. Later in the year, lawsuits are filed by both parties contending over whether or not the departure was voluntary.

=== February ===
- Green Day performs live at the NFL Honors event to open up the Super Bowl 2021 weekend.
- Foo Fighters released their tenth studio album, Medicine at Midnight, on February 5, 2021. Frontman Dave Grohl has worked on demos throughout 2019, and the band completed in March 2020, but its release was delayed due to the COVID-19 pandemic. The album topped the national charts of nine separate countries upon release. In the US, it debuted at number 3 on the Billboard 200 chart, moving 70,000 album-equivalent units. It was however the best-selling album in terms of pure album sales.
- The Pretty Reckless release their fourth studio album, Death by Rock and Roll in 2021. The album was completed in 2020, but frontwoman Taylor Momsen wished to delay the album until they could tour in support of the album and perform the new material live. The album topped the Billboard Top Album Sales chart, making it the best album of the week in terms of pure sales.
- Marilyn Manson is accused of sexual abuse by Evan Rachel Wood, leading to him being dropped from his record label and his songs being dropped from radio rotation.
- British band Architects releases their ninth studio album, For Those That Wish to Exist. It tops the UK and Australian all-format, national album charts.

=== March ===
- While rock music trails other genre in the realm of music streaming, which is factored into the Billboard 200 chart, it performs well in pure albums sales. In a single week, rock bands take the top three best selling albums in the US:
  - Chevelle releases their ninth studio album, Niratias. It is the number one selling album of the week in the US, selling 24,000 copies. Additionally, this places them at number 9 on the Billboard 200 chart that includes music streaming figures.
  - Kings of Leon release their seventh studio album, When You See Yourself, places second in sales, selling 22,000 copies.
  - A Day to Remember releases their seventh studio album You're Welcome. The album places third, selling 16,000 copies. The release had previously been intended to be released in 2020 before being delayed due to the COVID-19 pandemic. The band, previously dabbling in pop punk and screamo genre, took more of a pop rock approach with the album.
- Rob Zombie releases his seventh studio album, The Lunar Injection Kool Aid Eclipse Conspiracy. It debuts at number nine on the Billboard 200 chart, moving 28,000 copies. It is the seventh album of his to hit the top 10, making him seven out of seven. Additionally, the album tops the Billboard US pure Albums Sales chart.
- Serj Tankian, Armenian frontman of System of a Down, releases an EP of material that he had originally written for a hypothetical album for the band. The album, which would have been the first in over 15 years for the band, was cancelled, as the band was unable to agree how to proceed with recording new material, so Tankian instead decided to release his proposed songs as solo material. The EP is titled Elasticity, an allusion to the band's album Toxicity.
- Evanescence released their fourth studio album, The Bitter Truth, their first since 2011. Frontwoman Amy Lee describes it as "heavy and dark" and similar to the sound of their second album, The Open Door. While initially aiming for a 2020 release, it was pushed back into 2021 due to the COVID-19 pandemic. The album charts in the top ten of eight separate national charts, and debuts just outside of it at number eleven in the US.

=== April ===
- The Pretty Reckless has their sixth song, "And So It Went", top the Billboard Mainstream Rock chart, making them the first female-fronted band to do so. The song features a guitar solo by Tom Morello.
- Greta Van Fleet releases their second full-length album, The Battle at Garden's Gate. Lead singer Josh Kiszka describes it as "the next step...in the evolution in the sound of the band", an allusion to the fact that the band's sounds is often considered extremely similar to Led Zeppelin. The album debuts at number 7 on the Billboard 200, moving 43,000 album equivalent units. It also tops the Billboard Rock Albums chart, Hard Rock Albums chart, and nine of the twelve songs chart on the Hard Rock Songs chart.
- The Offspring released their tenth studio album, Let the Bad Times Roll, their first since 2012. Guitarist "Noodles" explained that the process had been slow due to trying to change their sound, only to return to their normal punk rock sound. The album was "basically complete" by June 2020, but its release was put on hold due to the COVID-19 pandemic.

=== May ===
- Weezer releases their fifteenth studio album, Van Weezer. Band frontman Rivers Cuomo stated the band would return to a guitar-heavy album in 2020, with heavy emphasis on guitar riffs and guitar solos. The album was inspired by enthusiastic fans response to these aspects of their live shows in recent years. The first single, "The End of the Game", contains over 100 guitar overdubs. With a big emphasis of the album being based around touring in support of it, the COVID-19 pandemic caused the band to delay the album to May 2021. Upon release, it tops the Billboard Top Album Sales chart, selling 23,000 copies.
- The Black Keys release their tenth studio album, Delta Kream, an album of blues cover songs. It debuts at number six on the Billboard 200 chart, moving 35,000 album equivalent units.
- American musical duo Twenty One Pilots released their sixth studio album, Scaled and Icy. The title is a play on the phrase "scaled back and isolated", an allusion to the album being recorded in isolation due to the COVID-19 pandemic.
- Machine Gun Kelly wins the Billboard Music Award for Top Rock Artist and Top Rock Album for Tickets to My Downfall, While alt rock trio AJR win Top Rock Song for Bang!
- Italian rock band Måneskin win the Eurovision Song Contest 2021, held at Rotterdam on 22 May, with "Zitti e buoni". Afterwards, the group's lead vocalist Damiano David told the audience: "We just want to say to the whole Europe [sic], to the whole world, rock and roll never dies." Finnish rock band Blind Channel finish in sixth place with their song "Dark Side".
- Dave Mustaine of Megadeth announces the band is parting ways with longtime bassist David Ellefson over recent sexual misconduct accusations.
- Seether has their second single in a row, "Bruised and Bloodied", top the Mainstream Rock chart. The first had been "Seether" in October 2020.
- Olivia Rodrigo's song "Good 4 U", often described as pop punk, tops the Billboard all-format Hot 100 chart.

=== June ===
- UK indie rock band Wolf Alice released their third studio album, Blue Weekend. It tops the UK all-format albums chart, selling 36,000 copies. It's their first to top the chart, after two consecutive debuts at number 2, and at time of release, the biggest debut of 2021 on the UK chart.
- Wolfgang Van Halen, under the moniker Mammoth WVH, releases his debut studio album, Mammoth WVH. It is the second best selling album in the US in its debut week, selling 30,000 copies.
- Garbage releases their seventh studio album, No Gods No Masters. The album was not delayed by Coronavirus, but rather, it is recording was used as therapy for front woman Shirley Manson, who was suffering from depression due to the Coronavirus shutdowns. The album makes the top ten of five separate national albums charts.

=== July ===
- Five Finger Death Punch single "Darkness Settles In" tops the Billboard Mainstream Rock songs chart, and stays there for five straight weeks. It is their seventh single in a row to top the chart, which ties them with Disturbed for most singles in a row to top the chart. Additionally, it is their eleventh single overall to top the chart, which is the fourth-most of all time, tied with Godsmack and behind Shinedown, Three Days Grace, and Van Halen.

=== August ===
- Rise Against's single "Nowhere Generation" tops the Mainstream Rock chart for a week. It is the first song in the bands 20 year career to top the chart.
- Meet Me at the Altar, pop punk upstarts with 2 million Spotify streams at the time of releasing only 2 songs, was signed to Fueled by Ramen, and releases their major label debut EP, Model Citizen. The band is described as "saving pop punk" by The New York Times.
- The Killers release their seventh album, Pressure Machine, despite releasing their prior album, Imploding the Mirage as recently as August 2020. It tops the UK all format albums chart in its debut, but only peaks at ninth on the US Billboard 200 albums chart.
- Pop artist Halsey released her fourth studio album, If I Can't Have Love, I Want Power . The album, produced by Nine Inch Nails's Trent Reznor and Atticus Ross, and is described as Halsey's rock album.
- Despite being relatively inactive in the last decade, Limp Bizkit is one of the few rock acts to perform at Lollapalooza. The performance receives favorable coverage from publications, resulting in a 100% in sales of their back catalogue.

=== September ===
- Daughtry releases their sixth studio album. Originally titled Nothing Lasts Forever, it was later renamed Dearly Beloved. After moving in more country and pop music directions in recent years, frontman Chris Daughtry states that the album will move back into the band's rock roots.

=== October ===
- Coldplay collaborates with K-pop band BTS for the pop rock song "My Universe", off of their ninth studio album Music of the Spheres. The song outperforms any rock song in 2021, debuting at the top of the Billboard all format Hot 100 chart, and all related Billboard rock sales and streaming charts.
- Bad Wolves released their third studio album, Dear Monsters in 2021. It was the first without lead singer Tommy Vext, who left in January of the same year. Vext insists he was forced out of the band by his label and bandmates over his controversial political and social views.

=== November ===
- Papa Roach's single "Kill the Noise" tops the Billboard Mainstream Rock chart. It is their seventh song to do so, and their second in 2021 after "The Ending". It stays atop the chart for 4 consecutive weeks.

=== December ===
- Swedish metal band Ghost tops the Billboard Mainstream Rock chart in the past week of December with their song "Hunter's Moon". It is their fourth song to top the chart, all within the last five years.

=== Year-end ===
- Shinedown is named Billboard's "Greatest of All-Time Mainstream Rock Artist", naming the most played artist in the entire radio format.
- Publications note that pop punk music sees an increase in attention after falling out of mainstream relevance in the late 2000s. Part of this is rap and pop musician's interest in the genre, including popular song's in or influenced by the genre by Machine Gun Kelly, Olivia Rodrigo, and The Kid Laroi.

== Deaths ==
- January 10
  - Mark Keds, 50, singer and guitarist of British punk band Senseless Things
  - Thorleif Torstensson, 71, singer, guitarist and saxophonist of Swedish ь Thorleifs; of COVID-19
- January 16
  - Pave Maijanen, 70, keyboardist of Finnish rock bands Hurriganes and Dingo
  - Phil Spector, 81, American record producer, musician, and songwriter and inventor of the Wall of Sound
- February 2 – Aaron Wegelin, drummer of American indie rock band Elf Power.
- February 4 – Matt Harris, former bassist of The Posies (exact date and cause of death unknown)
- February 5 – Örs Siklósi, 29, former lead singer of Hungarian metal and post-hardcore band (AWS); of leukemia.
- March 2 –Radim Pařízek, 67, Czech drummer (Citron) and media proprietor (complications from surgery)
- March 7 – Lars-Göran Petrov, 49, Swedish rock singer (cancer)
- March 15 – Doug Parkinson, 74, Australian rock singer
- April 5 – Henry Stephen, 79, Venezuelan rock singer (COVID-19)
- April 18 – Lars Ranzenberger, 53, German-born Spanish heavy metal bassist with Metalium (ultralight crash)
- May 4 – Rodolfo García, 75, Argentine rock drummer (Almendra, Aquelarre)
- May 15 – Đorđe Marjanović, 89, Serbian singer, pioneer of Yugoslav rock
- June 18 – Takeshi Terauchi, 82, Japanese guitarist
- July 1 – Bryan St. Pere, 52, drummer for rock band Hum.
- July 15 – Pyotr Mamonov, 70, Russian rock musician and songwriter (Zvuki Mu)
- July 26 - Mike Howe, 55, vocalist for American band Metal Church.
- July 27 - Joey Jordison, 46, past drummer for American band Slipknot.
- July 28 - Dusty Hill, 72, bassist for ZZ Top
- August 21 - Don Everly, 84, member of pioneer rock and roll duo The Everly Brothers
- August 24 – Charlie Watts, 80, drummer for The Rolling Stones.
- October 13 – Andrea Haugen, 52, German singer (killed in Kongsberg attack)
- October 28 – Raša Đelmaš, 71, Serbian rock musician
- November 19 – Hank von Hell, 49, Norwegian punk rock singer (Turbonegro)
- November 20 – David Longdon, 56, British progressive rock singer (Big Big Train)
- December 10 – János Kóbor, 78, Hungarian rock singer (Omega)
- December 10 – Michael Nesmith, 78, guitarist and vocalist for The Monkees
- December 24 – Marco Mathieu, 57, Italian bassist (Negazione) and journalist (stroke)
