= Killing Me Slowly =

Single by Bad Wolves

from the album N.A.T.I.O.N.
- Released: August 23, 2019
- Genre: Hard rock
- Length: 3:57
- Label: Eleven Seven
- Songwriters: John Boecklin, Andrew Colin Fulk, David Alan Gorman, Samuel Louis Karlin, Josh Adam Strock, Matthew S Thomas, Tommy Vext

Bad Wolves singles chronology
"Remember When" (2018)	"Killing Me Slowly" (2019)	"Sober" (2020)

Music video
- "Killing Me Slowly" on YouTube

"Killing Me Slowly" is a song by American rock band Bad Wolves. It was their first single off of their second studio album N.A.T.I.O.N.. It topped the Billboard Mainstream Rock Songs chart in January 2020.

== Background ==
The song was released on August 23, 2019, the same day that the band announced their second studio album would be titled N.A.T.I.O.N., making the song an instant grat download for pre-ordering the album. It was later released as an official single on October 25, 2019, the same day as N.A.T.I.O.N. release. A music video, directed by Nick Peterson, was released the same day. In January 2020, the song topped the Billboard Mainstream Rock Songs chart for a single week. The made it the band's third song to top the chart, after their cover of The Cranberries "Zombie" and "Remember When", making three of their first four singles ending up topping the chart, a feat only done quicker by The Pretty Reckless, who had their first four singles top the chart.

== Themes and composition ==
The song's lyrics deal with the subject of infidelity, and the aftermath that comes from it in romantic relationships. Loudwire described the song as a "pensive rock anthem" with "impassioned, soaring hooks".

== Personnel ==
- Tommy Vext – lead vocals
- Doc Coyle – lead guitar, backing vocals
- Chris Cain – rhythm guitar
- Kyle Konkiel – bass guitar, backing vocals
- John Boecklin – drums

== Charts ==
Chart (2020)	Peak position
US Mainstream Rock (Billboard)	1

== Certifications ==
Region	Certification	Certified units/sales
Canada (Music Canada)	Gold	40,000^{‡}
^{‡} Sales+streaming figures based on certification alone.
