= Disobey =

Studio album by Bad Wolves
- Released: May 11, 2018
- Recorded: 2017
- Studio: Hideout (Las Vegas); Sparrow Sound Studios (Los Angeles); Purple Skull Studios (Stockholm, Sweden); Audiohammer Studios (Orlando, Florida)
- Genre: Alternative metal; groove metal; djent; hard rock
- Length: 49:14
- Label: Eleven Seven
- Producer: John Boecklin; Tommy Vext; Mark Lewis; Wzrdbld; Philip Naslund (co.)

Bad Wolves chronology
Disobey (2018)	N.A.T.I.O.N. (2019)

Singles from Disobey
- 1. "Toast to the Ghost" Released: November 2, 2017; 2. "Zombie" Released: January 18, 2018; 3. "Hear Me Now" Released: April 20, 2018; 4. "Remember When" Released: June 21, 2018

Disobey is the debut studio album by the American heavy metal band Bad Wolves. The album peaked at number 23 on the US Billboard 200 chart.

The first single, "Toast to the Ghost", was released on November 2, 2017. They are also known for "Zombie", a cover of the 1994 song originally performed by The Cranberries, which was released on January 18, 2018, as the second single. The third single, "Hear Me Now", was released on April 20, 2018. The fourth and final single, "Remember When" was released on June 21, 2018.

Music videos have also been released for "Learn to Live" and "No Masters".

== Promotion ==
On April 17, 2018, the band announced a co-headlining U.S. tour with From Ashes to New in June, beginning at The Annex in Madison, Wisconsin and finishing in Oklahoma City's Diamond Ballroom. On August 14, they were announced on select October shows as a supporting act on Three Days Grace's fall European tour supporting their sixth album Outsider, starting at Portsmouth's Pyramids Centre and concluding in Warsaw's Progresja. On October 2, lead singer Tommy Vext was hospitalized during a show in Nottingham after suffering from "a severe viral bronchial infection" that he further explained on his Instagram page. Vext reached out to fellow Eleven Seven label mates As Lions and Bang Bang Romeo to take his band's place on the tour while he recovered.

== Critical reception ==
Professional ratings
Review scores
Source	Rating
Blabbermouth.net	8/10
New Noise Magazine	4/5 stars

Jay H. Gorania of Blabbermouth.net praised the band's musicianship for creating various sounds that aren't retreads of their former respective acts, giving note of their use of simplistic musical conventions to create an approachable yet hard-hitting record, concluding that, "[T]here has been a massive void on the contemporary side of heavy music in recent times. Bad Wolves is poised to move in for the kill." Nicholas Senior of New Noise Magazine said that despite the album's lengthy runtime, he lauded the band for crafting melodic groove metal tracks that don't dilute their sound to be accessible for mainstream rock radio, concluding that "Disobey, despite some startlingly political lyrics, have the hooks and riffs that should appeal to rock and metal fans aplenty."

== Chart performance ==
Disobey debuted and peaked at number 23 on the Billboard 200 the week of May 26, 2018, before dropping sixty-eight spots to number 91 the week of June 2 and leaving the next week. The album debuted at number 9 in Australia before dropping to number 35 the next week and leaving the chart completely. It did not fare as well in Switzerland, Austria and the UK, entering at numbers 24, 39 and 51 for one week.

== Track listing ==
Standard edition
No.	Title	Length
1.	"Officer Down"	3:29
2.	"Learn to Live"	3:40
3.	"No Masters"	3:53
4.	"Zombie" (The Cranberries cover)	4:15
5.	"Run for Your Life"	3:32
6.	"Remember When"	3:29
7.	"Better the Devil"	3:02
8.	"Jesus Slaves"	3:39
9.	"Hear Me Now" (featuring DIAMANTE)	3:39
10.	"Truth or Dare"	3:33
11.	"The Conversation"	3:38
12.	"Shape Shifter"	3:50
13.	"Toast to the Ghost"	5:30
Total length:		49:14

Vinyl-only bonus tracks
No.	Title	Length
14.	"I Swear"	3:31
15.	"Pacifico"	3:46
16.	"Blood 'N' Bone"	4:05
Total length:		60:36

B-sides
No.	Title	Length
14.	"Zombie" (acoustic)	4:19
15.	"Hear Me Now" (featuring DIAMANTE; acoustic)	3:43
16.	"Remember When" (acoustic)	3:29
17.	"Truth or Dare" (acoustic)	3:31

Note

The acoustic version of "Truth or Dare" is available only to members of the band's Patreon page.

== Personnel ==
Adapted credits from the liner notes of Disobey.

Bad Wolves

- Tommy Vext – lead vocals
- Doc Coyle – lead guitar, backing vocals
- Chris Cain – rhythm guitar
- Kyle Konkiel – bass guitar, backing vocals
- John Boecklin – drums

Additional musicians

- DIAMANTE – guest vocals on "Hear Me Now"
- Philip Naslund – additional instrumentation ("Zombie", "Hear Me Now")
- Max Karon – additional guitars

Production

- Kane Churko – mixing, mastering ("Zombie", "Remember When")
- Joseph McQueen – mixing ("No Masters", "Hear Me Now"), vocal engineering and mixing
- Kristoffer Folin – additional vocal recording
- Mark Lewis – drum engineering and producing
- Matt Brown – drum technician
- James Thatcher – drum technician
- John Douglas – mix assisting

Artwork

- Zoltan Bathory – cover art
- Trevor Niemann – package design
- Stephen Steelman – photography

== Charts ==
=== Weekly charts ===
Chart (2018)	Peak position
Australian Albums (ARIA)	9
Austrian Albums (Ö3 Austria)	39
Belgian Albums (Ultratop Flanders)	126
Canadian Albums (Billboard)	23
French Albums (SNEP)	141
German Albums (Offizielle Top 100)	55
New Zealand Heatseeker Albums (RMNZ)	9
Scottish Albums (OCC)	51
Swiss Albums (Schweizer Hitparade)	24
US Billboard 200	23
US Top Rock Albums (Billboard)	4

=== Year-end charts ===
Chart (2018)	Position
US Top Rock Albums (Billboard)	71

== Certifications ==
Region	Certification	Certified units/sales
Canada (Music Canada)	Gold	40,000^{‡}
^{‡} Sales+streaming figures based on certification alone.
