= Sober (Bad Wolves song) =

Single by Bad Wolves

from the album N.A.T.I.O.N.
- Released: January 13, 2020
- Recorded: 2019
- Genre: Rock
- Length: 3:16
- Label: Eleven Seven
- Songwriters: John Boecklin, Drew Fulk, Josh Adam Strock, Tommy Vext

Bad Wolves singles chronology
"Killing Me Slowly" (2019)	"Sober" (2020)	"Learn to Walk Again" (2020)

Music video
- "Sober" on YouTube

"Sober" is a song by American rock band Bad Wolves. It was their second single off of their second studio album N.A.T.I.O.N.. It topped the Billboard Mainstream Rock Songs chart for two weeks in June 2020.

== Background ==
The song was released in January 2020, as the second single from their third album, N.A.T.I.O.N., with a music video being released at the same time. The video features frontman Tommy Vext at an addiction recovery meeting. Vext had previously suffered from addiction, and had affected his role in bands he performed with in the past. The song will also be on the soundtrack for the film Sno Babies, a feature film scheduled for late 2020 release that depicts two girl's struggle with opiate addiction.

The song was the band's fifth song in a row to top the active rock chart, and their fourth to top the Billboard Mainstream Rock Songs chart. The song also made the band be the first to have two different songs top the latter chart, with "Killing Me Slowly" topping earlier in the year. Sober stayed atop of the chart for two weeks.

== Themes and composition ==
Lyrically, the song addresses alcohol addiction from multiple perspectives; from the one suffering from it, and from the people who are affected by it second-hand. Vext stated that he aspired to write about addiction from a different perspective than it typically is in modern music, stating:

The message is very different from traditional songs that seem to always perpetuate a mentality of self-victimization, which is exactly the kind of misguidedthinking that perpetuates the mental obsessive side of alcoholism and addiction. In the end, the moral of the story is about holding on to not giving up on ourselves or the people who are trying - who are really really trying to make and better themselves.

Vext states that the song also fits into N.A.T.I.O.N.'s larger message of support, inclusion, and anti-suicide, while Loudwire interpreted its lyrics to be about "relationship fragility".

Billboard described the song's sound as a "metal ballad", while Loudwire described it as a "mid-tempo, radio ready rock track". The track primarily plays out on an acoustic guitar and "clap-along beat", with an electric guitar solo at the bridge, and an uplifting tonal shift in the song's final chorus.

== Personnel ==
- Tommy Vext – lead vocals
- Doc Coyle – lead guitar, backing vocals
- Chris Cain – rhythm guitar
- Kyle Konkiel – bass guitar, backing vocals
- John Boecklin – drums

== Charts ==
Chart (2020)	Peak position
Czech Republic Airplay (ČNS IFPI)	6
Czech Republic Rock (IFPI)	1
US Mainstream Rock (Billboard)	1
