= Remember When (Bad Wolves song) =

Single by Bad Wolves

from the album Disobey
- Released: June 15, 2018
- Genre: Heavy metal
- Length: 3:29
- Label: Eleven Seven
- Songwriters: Tommy Vext; Drew Fulk; Josh Strock

Bad Wolves singles chronology
"Zombie" (2018)	"Remember When" (2018)	"Killing Me Slowly" (2019)

Music video
- "Remember When" on YouTube

"Remember When" is a song by the American heavy metal band Bad Wolves. It was their third single off of their debut album Disobey. It topped the Billboard Mainstream Rock chart for two weeks in 2019.

== Background ==
The song was first released on Bad Wolves' debut studio album Disobey in May 2018. A music video was released a month later on June 15, debuting exclusively on Apple Music. The song was released to radio in January 2019, and spent 24 weeks on the Billboard Mainstream Rock Songs chart, eventually topping it for a week in July 2019.

== Themes and composition ==
Lyrically, the song deals with the relationship between frontman Tommy Vext and his twin brother; while Vext chose a life of sobriety and pursued a career in the music industry as a singer, his brother became a drug dealer and struggled with addiction and substance abuse. Specifically, the song was inspired by the fact that his brother attempted to murder Vext. Vext explained:

"My twin brother is currently serving 17 years for attempted murder — [he] tried to kill me during a home invasion when he was high in 2010. [Testifying against him] was definitely one of the more difficult moments of my life. 'Remember When' kinda goes through a timeline and highlights two people who lived the exact same life and had the exact same hardships and advantages and disadvantages, and who we are ultimately as adults is defined by the choices that we made, and our lives reflect those choices."

While AntiHero Magazine described the original song as heavy metal, a separate acoustic version was released in February 2019.

== Personnel ==
Band

- Tommy Vext – lead vocals
- Doc Coyle – lead guitar, backing vocals
- Chris Cain – rhythm guitar
- Kyle Konkiel – bass, backing vocals
- John Boecklin – drums

Production

- Kane Churko – mixing, mastering

== Charts ==
=== Weekly charts ===
Chart (2019)	Peak position
US Hot Rock Songs (Billboard)	22

=== Year-end charts ===
Chart (2019)	Position
US Hot Rock Songs (Billboard)	63

== Certifications ==
Region	Certification	Certified units/sales
United States (RIAA)	Gold	500,000^{‡}
^{‡} Sales+streaming figures based on certification alone.
