= David Parry-Jones =

Welsh sports commentator

David Parry-Jones (25 September 1933 – 10 April 2017) was a Welsh sports commentator, TV current affairs presenter and writer. He presented BBC Wales Today for many years and was a rugby analyst for BBC Radio 5. He was the author of books on the sport of rugby; including several on the history of rugby in Wales.

== Life and career ==
Parry-Jones was born in Pontypridd on 25 September 1933. In 1952, after attending school in Cardiff, he went up to Merton College, Oxford, where he read Classics and captained the Greyhounds rugby union and Authentics and college cricket teams. After completing his national service, in 1959 he took up journalism and went on to become one of the BBC's best-known rugby commentators, most notably for his description of Llanelli's famous win over the All Blacks in 1972. He was more familiar to television viewers as a regular presenter of the nightly regional news programme Wales Today, which he hosted during the 1960s and 1970s.

Parry-Jones was the long-term partner of the broadcaster Beti George and lived in Cardiff. From 2009 he suffered from Alzheimer's disease, and Beti George raised awareness of the condition through the Welsh media. In 2013 S4C showed a programme about the disease, Un o Bob Tri ("One in Every Three"), and Beti George presented a programme, The Dreaded Disease – David's Story, on BBC Radio Wales. In February 2017, BBC One Wales produced a documentary, Beti and David: Lost for Words, that followed the couple over a number of months, and looked at the challenges and frustrations faced by carers in Wales.

Parry-Jones died on 10 April 2017, at a hospice in Penarth.

== Selected works ==
- The Dawes Decades: John Dawes and the Third Golden Era of Welsh Rugby (2006)
- The Gwilliam Seasons: John Gwilliam and the Second Golden Era of Welsh Rugby (2003)
- Prince Gwyn: Gwyn Nicholls and the First Golden Era of Welsh Rugby (1999)
- Action Replay – A Media Memoir (1993)
- The Rugby Clubs of Wales (1989)
- Rugby Remembered: From the Pages of the Illustrated London News (1988)
- Out of the Ruck (1986)
- Boots, Balls and Banter: Collection of Rugby Stories (1980)
