= Coed-y-bryn =

Village in Ceredigion, Wales

Coordinates: 52.078985°N 4.401085°W

- Village
- Coed-y-bryn Calvinistic Methodist chapel in 2008

- Location within Ceredigion
- OS grid reference: SN 3556 4501
  - Cardiff: 66.8 mi (107.5 km)
  - London: 186.8 mi (300.6 km)
- Community: Troedyraur
- Principal area: Ceredigion
- Country: Wales
- Sovereign state: United Kingdom
- Post town: Llandysul
- Postcode district: SA44
- Police: Dyfed-Powys
- Fire: Mid and West Wales
- Ambulance: Welsh
- UK Parliament: Ceredigion Preseli
- Senedd Cymru – Welsh Parliament: Ceredigion

Coed-y-bryn is a small village in the community of Troedyraur, Ceredigion, Wales. Coed-y-bryn is represented in the Senedd by Elin Jones and the Member of Parliament is Ben Lake (both Plaid Cymru).

== Notable people ==
- Siân James (1930–2021), a Welsh novelist, academic and translator
- Beti George (born 1939), a Welsh broadcaster of television and radio.

== See also ==
- List of localities in Wales by population
