= A Small Country =

1979 novel by Siân James

First edition (publ. Collins)

A Small Country is an English-language novel by Siân James, first published by Collins in 1979. It is James's third novel, and has come to be regarded as a significant publication in Anglo-Welsh literature. It includes themes of Welsh identity and women's experience in the pre-First World War period.

Set in 1914, the novel deals with the lives of a farming family in Carmarthenshire. The son, Tom, and daughter, Catrin, are both restless in their rural existence and their father, Josi, abandons his wife and the farm to live with a local schoolteacher.

A new edition, with an introduction by Stan Barstow, was published by Seren Books in 1999. The book was adapted for television in 2006, for a Welsh-language serial, Calon Gaeth; the dramatisation won the 2008 BAFTA Cymru award for Best Drama/Drama Serial for Television.
