= Dear Monsters =

Studio album by Bad Wolves
- Released: October 29, 2021
- Recorded: 2020–2021
- Studio: Sparrow Sound, Glendale, California
- Length: 45:03
- Label: Better Noise
- Producer: Josh Gilbert; John Boecklin

Bad Wolves chronology
N.A.T.I.O.N. (2019)	Dear Monsters (2021)	Sacred Kiss EP (2022)

Singles from Dear Monsters
- 1. "Lifeline" Released: September 7, 2021; 2. "If Tomorrow Never Comes" Released: October 28, 2021; 3. "Sacred Kiss" Released: July 29, 2022

Dear Monsters is the third studio album by the American heavy metal band Bad Wolves. It was released on October 29, 2021 through Better Noise Music and was produced by Josh Gilbert. It is the first of two albums to feature vocalist Daniel "DL" Laskiewicz, after the departure of Tommy Vext from the band in January 2021, and the last to feature rhythm guitarist Chris Cain, who left the group in April 2022.

== Background and recording ==
Following the completion of their tour promoting N.A.T.I.O.N. (2019), Bad Wolves began writing music for their third studio album. In an interview in October 2020, former Bad Wolves vocalist Tommy Vext confirmed that the band had almost completed their third studio album and that they may release it six months early exclusively via Patreon. However, on January 8, 2021, Vext announced his departure from the band, with intention to launch his own solo career.

On June 2, 2021, Bad Wolves announced Daniel "DL" Laskiewicz had joined the band as their lead vocalist and that they were working on their third album called Dear Monsters, which they claimed would be "the best Bad Wolves album to date". Laskiewicz was previously involved in the songwriting of N.A.T.I.O.N.

According to Laskiewicz, "The album [Dear Monsters] was about 60% done when I joined the band." Despite this, Laskiewicz was involved in the songwriting and helped the other band members with the completion of the remaining 40% of the album.

== Release and promotion ==
It is supported by the singles "Lifeline" and "If Tomorrow Never Comes". Bad Wolves was originally going to promote the album as a support act on Tremonti's European tour in January 2022 but the tour was later rescheduled. They instead supported Papa Roach's Kill The Noise tour in March 2022. A deluxe edition of the album was released on October 28, 2022.

== Critical reception ==
Professional ratings
Review scores
Source	Rating
Hysteria Magazine	7/10
Wall of Sound	6/10

Dear Monsters was met with mixed to favorable reviews. KJ Draven of Wall of Sound writes "They [Bad Wolves] have written some cool heavy riffs and more melodic tracks to put together a collection that has peaks and valleys that make for a great drinkin' and singin' album… There are decent album tracks, and might even make good singles, but they don’t rock me."

Alan Ronson of Brutal Planet wrote that "Bad Wolves has proved they can not only make great music but can sustain the behemoth of the music industry and endure a change in their lineup. It takes a special kind of determination to undergo all that affliction and come out on top with an album as stunning as this. 'Dear Monsters' is an intense and passionate response to all the beasts who attempted to devour them."

== Track listing ==
Dear Monsters track listing
No.	Title	Length
1.	"Sacred Kiss"	4:04
2.	"Never Be the Same"	3:50
3.	"Lifeline"	3:13
4.	"Wildfire"	3:16
5.	"Comatose"	4:03
6.	"Gone"	3:40
7.	"On the Case"	3:27
8.	"If Tomorrow Never Comes"	3:08
9.	"Springfield Summer"	4:16
10.	"House of Cards"	4:19
11.	"Classical"	3:33
12.	"In the Middle"	4:09
Total length:		45:06

Deluxe edition
No.	Title	Length
13.	"Mama, I'm Coming Home (Ozzy Osbourne cover)"	3:50
14.	"If Tomorrow Never Comes (featuring Spencer Charnas)"	3:09
15.	"The Body"	3:51
16.	"Sacred Kiss" (featuring Aaron Pauley)	4:04
17.	"Up in Smoke"	4:09
18.	"I Don't Wanna Feel"	3:21
19.	"Wildfire" (orchestral)	4:03
20.	"Sacred Kiss" (acoustic)	2:32
21.	"If Tomorrow Never Comes" (acoustic)	3:14
22.	"Lifeline" (acoustic)	3:35
Total length:		80:35

== Personnel ==
Bad Wolves

- Daniel "DL" Laskiewicz – lead vocals
- Doc Coyle – lead guitar, backing vocals
- Chris Cain – rhythm guitar, backing vocals
- Kyle Konkiel – bass, backing vocals
- John Boecklin – drums, percussion, producer

Production

- Josh Gilbert – producer

== Charts ==
Chart performance for Dear Monsters
Chart (2021)	Peak position
German Albums (Offizielle Top 100)	83
Swiss Albums (Schweizer Hitparade)	94
UK Album Downloads (Official Charts)	42
UK Independent Albums (Official Charts)	29
UK Rock & Metal Albums (Official Charts)	16
