= N.A.T.I.O.N. =

Studio album by Bad Wolves
- Released: October 25, 2019
- Genres: Alternative metal; groove metal; hard rock
- Length: 42:40
- Label: Eleven Seven
- Producers: John Boecklin; Joseph McQueen; Tommy Vext

Bad Wolves chronology
Disobey (2018)	N.A.T.I.O.N. (2019)	Dear Monsters (2021)

Singles from N.A.T.I.O.N.
- 1. "Killing Me Slowly" Released: August 23, 2019; 2. "Sober" Released: January 13, 2020; 3. "Learn to Walk Again" Released: August 4, 2020

N.A.T.I.O.N. (pronounced "Nation" by band members in interview) is the second studio album by the American heavy metal band Bad Wolves. It was released through Eleven Seven Music on October 25, 2019. It is supported by the singles "Learn to Walk Again", "Sober" and "Killing Me Slowly". Bad Wolves promoted the album as a support act on Five Finger Death Punch's headline arena tour with Fire from the Gods and Three Days Grace in November 2019. It is the last album to feature vocalist Tommy Vext, after his departure from the band in January 2021. Loudwire named it one of the 50 best rock albums of 2019.

== Background ==
The band stated that the album features a more "focused" sound than their debut, 2018's Disobey. Guitarist Doc Coyle called the record "diverse", saying that "There's stuff that's probably heavier, as or more heavy than the last record... And then there's some really catchy, kind of more mainstream stuff to cover that end of it, and a lot of stuff in the middle."

== Track listing ==
No.	Title	Length
1.	"I'll Be There"	4:02
2.	"No Messiah"	4:20
3.	"Learn to Walk Again"	2:47
4.	"Killing Me Slowly"	3:57
5.	"Better Off This Way"	3:22
6.	"Foe or Friend"	3:26
7.	"Sober"	3:15
8.	"Back in the Days"	3:43
9.	"The Consumerist"	3:29
10.	"Heaven So Heartless"	3:35
11.	"Crying Game"	3:11
12.	"L.A. Song"	3:33
Total length:		42:40

Patreon exclusive tracks
No.	Title	Length
13.	"Shanghai" (B-side from the N.A.T.I.O.N. session)	3:31
14.	"Heart-Shaped Box" (Nirvana cover)	4:29
15.	"Last Resort" (Papa Roach cover)	4:05
16.	"Video Games" (Lana Del Rey cover)	4:27
17.	"Everybody Wants to Rule the World" (Tears for Fears cover)	3:09
18.	"Take Me to Church" (Hozier cover)	4:03
19.	"Crawling" (Linkin Park cover)	3:48
20.	"Hollywood's Bleeding" (Post Malone cover)	2:37
21.	"The Hills" (The Weeknd cover)	4:15
22.	"Look at Me Now" (Chris Brown cover)	1:48
23.	"Bitch Better Have My Money" (Rihanna cover)	3:44
24.	"Cry Me a River" (Justin Timberlake cover)	4:51
25.	"Hometown Glory" (Adele cover)	3:54
Total length:		91:21

== Credits ==
- Tommy Vext – lead vocals, producer
- Doc Coyle – lead guitar, backing vocals
- Chris Cain – rhythm guitar
- Kyle Konkiel – bass guitar, backing vocals
- John Boecklin – drums, producer

Production

- Joseph McQueen – producer, engineering, mixing, mastering

Additional musicians

- Max Karon – additional guitars
- Emma Zander – additional backing vocals
- Mark Lewis – percussion

== Charts ==
Chart (2019)	Peak position
Australian Albums (ARIA)	46
Austrian Albums (Ö3 Austria)	44
German Albums (Offizielle Top 100)	60
Scottish Albums (Official Charts)	88
Swiss Albums (Schweizer Hitparade)	63
US Billboard 200	78
