= Siân James (novelist) =

Welsh writer in English (1930–2021)

- Born: 20 September 1930; Coed-y-bryn, Ceredigion, Wales
- Died: 21 July 2021
- Education: University of Wales, Aberystwyth
- Occupations: Novelist, academic, translator
- Spouse: Emrys James (m. 1958; died 1989)
- Writing career
- Language: English
- Notable works: A Small Country; One Afternoon; Not Singing Exactly
- Notable awards: Wales Book of the Year; Yorkshire Post Prize

Siân James (20 September 1930 – 21 July 2021) was a Welsh novelist, academic and translator, who wrote in English. Her third novel, A Small Country, is seen as a classic of Anglo-Welsh literature. Her 1996 short-story collection Not Singing Exactly won the English-language category in Wales Book of the Year, the first book by a woman to do so.

== Birth and academic posts ==
James, born in Coed-y-bryn in Ceredigion, attended the University of Wales, Aberystwyth. She was a Fellow of the University of Wales, Aberystwyth, and of the Welsh Academy. She taught on the University of Glamorgan's Masters' degree in Creative Writing. She was later awarded an honorary doctorate by the university for her contribution to literature in Wales.

== Writing career ==
Siân James twice won the Yorkshire Post Prize, for her first and second novels One Afternoon and Yesterday. One Afternoon was republished in 2023. Her third novel, A Small Country, is regarded as a classic of Anglo-Welsh literature. In 2006, A Small Country was adapted as a Welsh-language TV series, Calon Gaeth, which won the 2007 Bafta Cymru award for Best Drama/Drama Serial for Television.

James translated Kate Roberts's novel Y Byw Sy'n Cysgu into English as The Awakening. She also published a memoir, The Sky Over Wales, in 1997. In the same year, her short-story collection Not Singing Exactly won the Wales Book of the Year award.

== Family ==
In 1958 Siân James married the Welsh Shakespearean actor Emrys James and set up a home with him in London and later Worcestershire. They had four children, William, Owen, Jo and Anna. Emrys James died in 1989.

== Works ==
- One Afternoon (1975) (Reprinted by Persephone Books in 2023)
- Yesterday (1978)
- A Small Country (1979)
- Another Beginning (1979)
- Dragons and Roses (1983)
- A Dangerous Time (1984)
- Love and War (1994)
- Storm at Arberth (1994)
- Not Singing Exactly (collected short stories, 1996)
- Two Loves (1997)
- The Sky Over Wales (memoir, 1997)
- Summer Storm (1998)
- Second Chance (2000)
- Outside Paradise (short stories, 2001)
- Summer Shadows (2004)
- Return to Hendre Ddu (2009)
