= Beti George =

Welsh broadcaster

- Born: 19 January 1939 (age 87); Coed-y-bryn, Ceredigion, Wales
- Education: Cardiff University; Aberystwyth University
- Occupations: Radio and television broadcaster
- Partner: David Parry-Jones
- Children: Iestyn George

Beti George (born 19 January 1939) is a Welsh broadcaster of television and radio. She began working for the BBC in Swansea and was best known for presenting the nightly Welsh-language news programme, Newyddion. Since 1987 she has presented a radio programme called Beti a'i Phobol on BBC Radio Cymru.

== Biography ==
=== Early life ===
George was born n Coed-y-bryn near Llangrannog. She studied at Cardiff University and Aberystwyth University. George taught at a grammar school in Brecon for 18 months.

=== Career ===
George started her career as a freelance with the BBC as a reporter for the programme "Bore Da" (Good Morning) alongside T. Glynne Davies who inspired her. She also introduced a number of music programmes as well as presenting the Welsh-language news broadcast Newyddion on S4C. She was one of the presenters of a series called DNA Wales; it broadcast a special programme on St. David's Day in 2015 and showed a series of four programmes between November and December 2015. George has presented a programme on BBC Radio Cymru called Beti a'i Phobol since 1985, where she talks to different guests each week.

=== Personal life ===
Her partner was the writer and broadcaster David Parry-Jones and they lived in Cardiff. Their relationship of 42 years lasted until Parry-Jones' death from Alzheimer's disease in 2017. George raised awareness of the condition through the Welsh media. She presented Un o Bob Tri for S4C i, and the programmeThe Dreaded Disease – David's Story on BBC Radio Wales .

In 2017 a documentary - David and Beti : Lost for Words, broadcast on BBC Cymru/Wales and BBC One, won a gold award at the New York Film Festival.

She has a son, Iestyn George, who is a journalist and former music editor for NME and GQ magazines.

=== Political Views ===
George rejected an MBE on the grounds that it would be hypocritical and that she is a republican.

She is a supporter of Welsh independence. She said: "We can't afford not to embrace independence and a new system of government – one that puts the emphasis on well-being rather than on dreary monetary and GDP statistics which don't seem to be working anyway. An egalitarian Wales that would be outwardly looking, that would work with other like minded nations to end poverty and tackle climate change, and would joyfully share and exchange language and cultural experiences."
