= Diamante (musician) =

American singer-songwriter (born 1996)

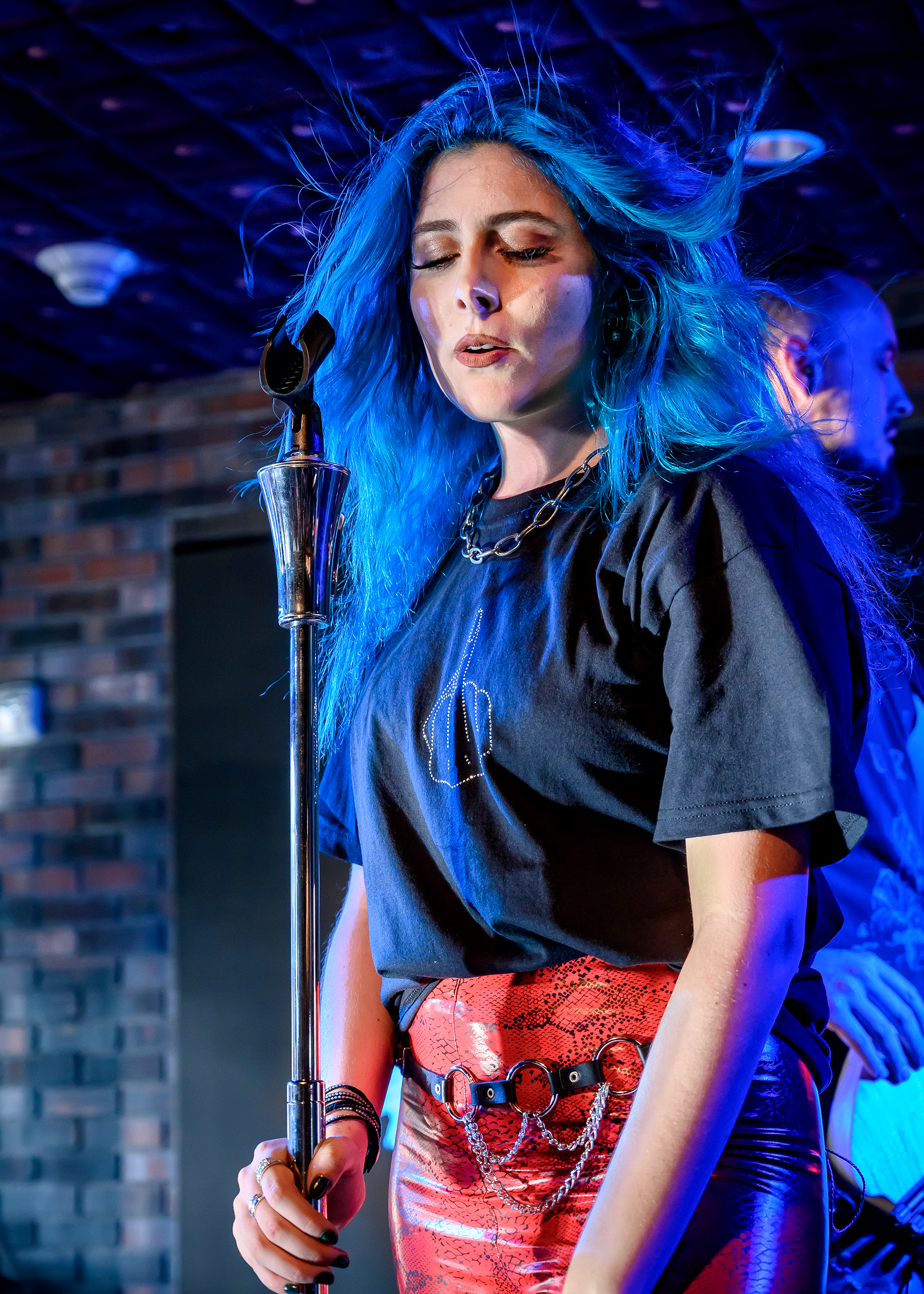
- Diamante performing in 2019

Background information
- Born: Diamante Azzura Bovelli; September 7, 1996 (age 30); Irvine, California, US
- Origin: Boston, Massachusetts, U.S.
- Genres: Hard rock; alternative rock; pop rock
- Occupations: Singer; songwriter
- Instrument: Vocals
- Years active: 2014–present
- Labels: Better Noise; Sumerian
- Website: thisisdiamante.com

Diamante Azzura Bovelli (born September 7, 1996), known mononymously as Diamante, is an American singer and songwriter.

== Career ==
Diamante's first widely released work was the 2017 single "Haunted". Her debut album Coming in Hot was released under Better Noise Music on June 15, 2018.

In 2018, she provided guest vocals on the Bad Wolves song "Hear Me Now", from the band's debut album Disobey, which reached number one on active rock radio. In early to mid-2019, she toured in support of Breaking Benjamin to further promote her album.

On January 17, 2020, she announced her departure from Better Noise Music and released the single "Obvious" through her own label, Anti-Heroine. An acoustic version of the song was released on February 14, 2020. On April 17, 2020, Diamante released the third single "Serves You Right". On May 29, 2020, she released the fourth single "Ghost Myself". Her cover of the Goo Goo Dolls' "Iris" was released on July 10, 2020, and features Breaking Benjamin frontman Benjamin Burnley.

In April 2021, Diamante announced that her second studio album, American Dream, would be released independently on May 7. In 2021 and 2022, Diamante made several festival appearances and toured in support of Shinedown and The Pretty Reckless to promote the album.

On October 28, 2022, Diamante released a cover EP titled The Diamond Covers, which consisted of her covers of "Maniac", "Dancing on My Own", "Paparazzi", "Like a Prayer" and "Running Up That Hill".

On November 10, 2023, Diamante released a new song titled "1987". On August 20, 2024, Diamante announced her signing to Sumerian Records and released the song "All for the Glory". On August 6, 2025, Diamante released the single, "Silver Bullet". On March 6, 2026, Diamante released the single, "Bite of the Beast", while on tour with I See Stars. On September 22, 2026, she released the single, "Cool Down".

On October 20, 2026, Diamante announced her third studio album, SUPERNOVA, with the release of the single "Hollywood Blvd".

== Personal life ==
Diamante is of Mexican and Italian descent. In addition to her native English, she can also speak Italian and Spanish.

In 2021, Diamante graduated from the University of Redlands with a Bachelor of Science (BS) degree in Business Administration.

== Discography ==
=== Studio albums ===
Title	Details	Peak chart positions	
Title	Details	US Heat.	US Indie.
Coming in Hot	Released: June 15, 2018; Label: Better Noise; Format: Digital download, streaming	12	49
American Dream	Released: May 7, 2021; Label: Anti-Heroine (self-released); Format: Digital download, streaming	—	—
"—" denotes a release that did not chart or a value that is not applicable.

=== Extended plays ===
List of extended plays (EPs)
Title	EP details
The Diamond Covers	Released: October 28, 2022; Label: Anti-Heroine; Format: Digital download, streaming

=== Singles ===
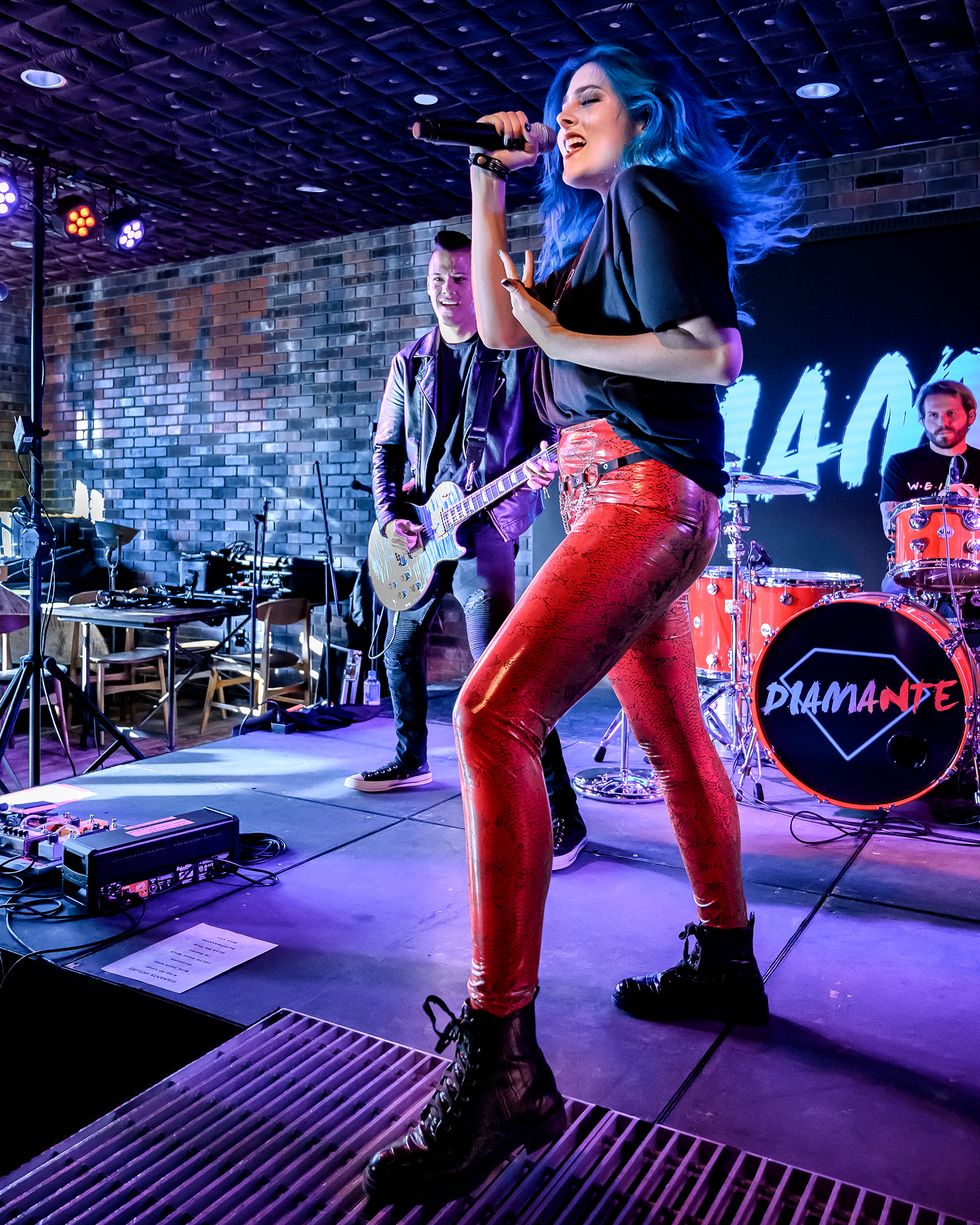
Diamante performing in 2019

==== As lead artist ====
Title	Year	Peak chart positions		Album
Title	Year	US Air.	US Main.	Album
"Bite Your Kiss"	2014	—	—	Dirty Blonde
"Coming in Hot"	2017	—	—	Coming In Hot
"Haunted"	2018	38	13	Coming In Hot
"Obvious"	2020	—	—	American Dream
"Serves You Right"	2020	—	—	American Dream
"Ghost Myself"	2020	—	—	American Dream
"Iris" (featuring Breaking Benjamin)	2020	—	—	American Dream
"I Love Myself for Hating You"	2020	—	—	American Dream
"Difícil de Amar	2022	—	—	Non-album singles
"American Dream" (featuring Lit)	2022	—	—	Non-album singles
"Running Up That Hill"	2022	—	—	The Diamond Covers
"Like a Prayer"	2022	—	—	The Diamond Covers
"1987"	2023	—	—	SUPERNOVA
"All for the Glory"	2024	—	—	SUPERNOVA
"Silver Bullet"	2025	—	—	SUPERNOVA
"Bite of the Beast"	2026	—	—	SUPERNOVA
"Cool Down"	2026	—	—	SUPERNOVA
"Hollywood Blvd"	2026	—	—	SUPERNOVA
"Cry Wolf"	2026	—	—	SUPERNOVA
"—" denotes a release that did not chart or a value that is not applicable.

==== As featured artist ====
Title	Year	Peak chart positions		Album
Title	Year	US Main.	US Rock	Album
"The Thunder Rolls" (All That Remains featuring Diamante)	2017	23	26	Madness
"Hear Me Now" (Bad Wolves featuring Diamante)	2018	2	25	Disobey

=== Music videos ===
Title	Year	Director(s)	Ref.
"Bite Your Kiss"	2014	CODENAME	
"Coming in Hot"	2017	Nayip Ramos	
"Had Enough"	2018	Sofia Lane	
"I'm Sorry"	2018	Ben Guzman and Ryan Ewing	
"Haunted"	2018	Postas	
"Bulletproof"	2018	Postas	
"Lo Siento"	2019	Postas	
"Sleepwalking"	2019	Postas	
"When I'm Not Around"	2019	Postas	
"Iris" (with Breaking Benjamin)	2020	Alyson Coletta	
"Obvious"	2020	Kevin Garcia	
"Ghost Myself"	2021	Nayip Ramos	
"American Dream"	2021	Nayip Ramos	
"Unlovable"	2021	Nayip Ramos	
"1987"	2023	Jared Asher Harris	
"All for the Glory"	2024	Jared Asher Harris	
"Silver Bullet"	2025	Nas Bogado	
"Cool Down"	2026	Grace Stromatt	
