= Zombie (The Cranberries song) =

1994 single by the Cranberries

- CD/vinyl variant of standard artwork

Single by the Cranberries

from the album No Need to Argue
- B-side: "Away"; "I Don't Need"
- Released: 19 September 1994
- Recorded: 1994
- Studio: The Manor (Oxford); Townhouse (London)
- Genre: Alternative rock; grunge
- Length: 5:06
- Label: Island
- Songwriter: Dolores O'Riordan
- Producer: Stephen Street

The Cranberries singles chronology
"Linger" (1993)	"Zombie" (1994)	"Ode to My Family" (1994)

Music video
- "Zombie" on YouTube

Audio sample
- Zombie: file; help

"Zombie" is a protest song by Irish alternative rock band the Cranberries. It was written by the lead singer, Dolores O'Riordan, about the young victims of a bombing in Warrington, England, during the Troubles in Northern Ireland. The song was released on 19 September 1994 by Island Records as the lead single from the Cranberries' second studio album, No Need to Argue (1994). Critics have described "Zombie" as "a masterpiece of alternative rock", with grunge-style distorted guitar and shouted vocals uncharacteristic of the band's other work.

While Island Records feared releasing a politically charged song as a single, "Zombie" reached No. 1 on the charts of Australia, Belgium, Denmark, France, Germany, and Iceland. The song reached No. 1 on the US Billboard Alternative Airplay chart. Listeners of the Australian radio station Triple J voted it No. 1 on the 1994 Triple J Hottest 100 chart, and it won the Best Song Award at the 1995 MTV Europe Music Awards. The music video was directed by Samuel Bayer, and featured O'Riordan singing while painted gold, and footage of war-torn Belfast. In April 2020, it became the first song by an Irish group to surpass one billion views on YouTube.

The Cranberries noted that "Zombie" drew strong responses from audiences. After O'Riordan's death in 2018, it became an Irish stadium anthem, first for the teams from the Cranberries' hometown of Limerick, and later for the Ireland national rugby union team starting in the 2023 Rugby World Cup. The band recorded acoustic, stripped-down versions on MTV Unplugged and the 2017 album Something Else. "Zombie" has been covered by numerous artists; O'Riordan had planned to contribute vocals to a version by the American band Bad Wolves, which was released days after her death.

== Background and composition ==
The Troubles were a conflict in Northern Ireland from the late 1960s to 1998. The Provisional Irish Republican Army (IRA), an Irish republican paramilitary organisation, waged an armed campaign to end British rule in Northern Ireland and unite the region with the Republic of Ireland. Republican and Loyalist paramilitaries killed more than 3,500 people, many from thousands of bomb attacks. One of the bombings happened on 20 March 1993, as two IRA improvised explosive devices hidden in litter bins were detonated in a shopping street in Warrington, England. Two children were killed in the attack: Johnathan Ball, aged 3, and Tim Parry, aged 12. 56 people were injured. Ball died at the scene of the bombing as a result of his fragmentation-inflicted injuries, and five days later, Parry died in a hospital as a result of head injuries. O'Riordan decided to write a song that reflected upon the event and the children's deaths after visiting the town:

There were a lot of bombs going off in London and I remember this one time a child was killed when a bomb was put in a rubbish bin – that's why there's that line in the song, 'A child is slowly taken'. [ ... ] We were on a tour bus and I was near the location where it happened, so it really struck me hard – I was quite young, but I remember being devastated about the innocent children being pulled into that kind of thing. So I suppose that's why I was saying, 'It's not me' – that even though I'm Irish it wasn't me, I didn't do it. Because being Irish, it was quite hard, especially in the UK when there was so much tension.

— Dolores O'Riordan in 2017, on writing "Zombie".

O'Riordan said "Zombie" came to her "subconsciously" midway through the Cranberries' English tour in 1993, writing the core chords on her acoustic guitar. Once O'Riordan was back in her hometown of Limerick and returned to her flat after a night out, she played those chords and started building a song around them, quickly "coming up with the chorus, which was catchy and anthemic", and soon moving onto the verses. O'Riordan took the song idea, originally titled "In Your Head", into the Cranberries' small rehearsal shed in Mungret. Given she was playing an acoustic guitar, the rest of the band initially followed along in, as guitarist Noel Hogan put it, "that kind of sweet indie pop thing" that the band featured in their other songs, before O'Riordan decided that it was not what she wanted, picked up an electric guitar and stated that "it needs to be heavy because it's angry". Drummer Fergal Lawler recalled that usually in that small room, "you're trying to keep it low because you don't want to deafen anybody", but O'Riordan played it loud and "we couldn't really hear the lyrics because she was singing through her guitar", and that the singer was adamant that she wanted more distortion pedals on the guitars and asked for more strength than usual in drumming.

== Production and release ==
"Years from now, when alternative rock is just a distant memory from a time long forgotten, certain songs will remain. 'Zombie' will forever live on as a true classic moment from a truly classic era of music. Not before or since has a band hit on a moment and absolutely capitalised like The Cranberries did with 'Zombie'. ... Thank you for giving us alternative rock's true masterpiece".

— Author Joe Hughes, in 2018.

Soon after "Zombie" was completed, the Cranberries added it to their set list. Lawler said they performed it for a year before recording it, and audiences responded with enthusiasm. The song was recorded and mixed at the Manor Studio in Oxford and at Townhouse Studios in London in 1994 with producer Stephen Street. They spent a long time working on getting the guitar settings right to give a suitably expansive sound, with O'Riordan noting "the sound came organically, because we were using our live instruments, we were plugging in a lot, and we started to mess around with feedback and distortion". Hogan contributed rhythm guitar to provide textures under O'Riordan's riffs. "Zombie" departed from the strings and jangle guitar of the Cranberries' debut album, Everybody Else Is Doing It, So Why Can't We? (1993). Hogan said it made them realise "that you can actually be heavy and still have melody", marking a change in their composition style and performances.

Knowing its potential, the Cranberries wanted "Zombie" to be the lead single for their album No Need to Argue. Their former manager, Allen Kovac, said that Island Records urged them not to release the "politically urgent" song as a single, and that O'Riordan had ripped up a $1-million cheque the label offered her to work on another song. "Dolores was a very small, fragile person, but very opinionated," said Kovac. "Her belief was that she was an international artist and she wanted to break the rest of the world, and 'Zombie' was part of that evolution. She felt the need to expand beyond 'I love you, you love me' and write about what was happening in Ireland at the time", he said. Island Records and management also said "Zombie" was "too controversial, you might not get played on the radio". Hogan added that the label were not expecting a lead single sounding different from the band's output "instead of coming out with another 'Linger' or 'Dreams'". Lawler recalled arguing to the record label that during the year the band had played "Zombie" in concert, "for a new song that the audience hadn't heard before, they really reacted to it", which was "a sign that it's a catchy song. People like it. It has to work.” Over time, "[w]e pushed and pushed and eventually they decided to release it", he said. By the time the single for "Zombie" was released on 19 September 1994, as well as its parent album No Need to Argue the following month, with a music video in heavy rotation on MTV, the Cranberries were catapulted to international stardom. Shortly after, ideological beliefs came rushing to the forefront of local newspapers, criticising O'Riordan for writing about the Troubles. O'Riordan said she "knew that would be the angle of the song, because it was controversial". Assessing the cultural impact of their song, Hogan responded: "Because of this song, people thought we were a political band. ... Far from it. Dolores always wrote from the heart". O'Riordan would later state, "If I think something, I have to say it. And I really don't care what anybody thinks, you know?". NPR's Andrew Limbong, speaking after O'Riordan's death in 2018, said "even though it was a political song, it wasn't necessarily politics she was interested in writing about". O'Riordan said, "I just cannot accept children being slaughtered at the hands of political violence", and hoped that "it might make people reflect a bit on our society and what we've become."

== Music and lyrics ==
"Zombie" has been characterised by commentators as alternative rock and grunge. O'Riordan later said it was not a concerted effort to ride the grunge movement, but she stated that "this wasn't grunge, but the timing was good", adding that, "We were just a different type of a band... and we had a lot of our own ideas". Hogan noted in a Rolling Stone interview that the Cranberries were beforehand accepted by "the same kind of [grunge] audience". O'Riordan was responsible for the heavier sound, a mere expression of her musical taste, as she would say later "we got it out of our system... all that anger out of our system". Discussing the musical approach and the requirement of a sound significantly louder, Hogan explained in a 2012 interview with Amsterdam's FaceCulture that "the heavier sound was the right thing for the song. If it was soft, it wouldn't have had that impact. It would stand out in the live set because of that." Particularly offended that terrorists claimed to have carried out these acts in the name of Ireland, O'Riordan asserted: "The IRA are not me. I'm not the IRA. The Cranberries are not the IRA. My family are not. When it says in the song, 'It's not me, it's not my family,' that's what I'm saying. It's not Ireland, it's some idiots living in the past." O'Riordan received criticism for the "hard-hitting lyrics"; she responded that it was written from a humanitarian perspective. O’Riordan's mother, Eileen, said: "It wasn’t written as a political song but as an anti-violence, an anti-war song."

O'Riordan never revealed the origin of the "zombie" reference in the lyrics, a concept which admits a personal interpretation of its meaning. However, there was a divergence of opinion among writers on the subject. Writing for The Telegraph, Ed Power formulated his own hypothesis, saying that the word Zombie was "a commentary on how blindly cleaving to centuries old prejudices can reduce [one's] capacity for independent thought". Culture Trip writer Graham Fuller commented that the metaphor perhaps "reanimates the children whose deaths inspired O'Riordan to write it". Sonia Saraiya, music and TV critic from Miami Herald and Chicago Tribune, had a different view, saying that the Zombie is not the dead children, but "the dead children that populate your mind; the dead bodies you've seen in the images that you can't forget".

=== Singing voice ===
O'Riordan's vocals were noted as reminiscent of the sean-nós singing style, for the rapid and repeated changes in pitch, most notably yodeling when she does the sharp break from chest register to head register in the second syllable of the word Zom-bie, and doing an amplified method forming her vowels and consonants. This creates a vocal trademark when combined with the Gaelic keening, the lilting vocables, and sung in her thick Irish accent. Author Bart Plantenga wrote in his book Yodel in Hi-Fi: From Kitsch Folk to Contemporary Electronica that "[h]er waify, quavering, breaking voice has a natural 'Celtic yodel' in it. It can also be heard on 'Zombie'" [and other songs] used "for fantastic emotional effect". Mikael Wood of Los Angeles Times described O'Riordan "pushing her voice to a jagged extreme to embody the pain", with a "desperate, yodeling vocal that conjures some ancient emotion". Far Out Magazine commented that her vocal performance was "guttural, pleading, captivating and utterly unique, O'Riordan begs for humanity the only way she knew how". Saraiya wrote that her voice "often seemed bigger than her petite frame", and also commented that the chorus "practically grunted out of her otherwise bell-like voice with a guttural vowel sound".

O'Riordan's voice is just in a league all its own. She makes no effort to hide her accent. In fact, it adds a richness and character to her voice. O'Riordan lays it all out on the table. Beautifully. Uncompromising and unrelenting. O'Riordan sinks her hooks into you and holds you hostage with her breathtaking vocal onslaught.

— Joe Hughes, How The Cranberries Blew Away Nirvana With Definitive Grunge Song "Zombie" – Alternative Nation.

== Critical reception ==
=== Praise ===
Tedium's editor, Ernie Smith, said that O'Riordan wrote "Zombie" in a moment of anger and passion, and called it "one of the defining songs of the alternative rock era". Rebecca Black of the Belfast Telegraph described "Zombie" as an "outraged response to the Warrington bombs", while music reporter Mark Savage wrote that "her pain was real", describing it as "a visceral response to the death of two children". In a contemporary review, Hot Press praised "Zombie" and its arrangements, saying that it was stylistically different from the band's previous works: "Staccato rhythms and subtle jerks and pauses in the music and the singing make this more than just business-as-usual for the Cranberries. A slow, brooding Siouxsie-like buzzing guitar melody and dirge-like bass and drums counterpoint the elliptical and impassioned vocals of Dolores O'Riordan as she works her way through the internal psychic and external human tragedies of the Troubles [...] "Zombie" signals a growth in confidence". The Rough Guide to Rock identified the album No Need to Argue as "more of the same" as the Cranberries' debut album, except for the song "Zombie", which had an "angry grunge" sound and "aggressive" lyrics. Music critic Evelyn McDonnell allowed that O'Riordan had a "certain naivety to her and also a real toughness". New York arts editor Graham Fuller partially echoed this view, saying "she was right, but that naivety serves a song that's an unfiltered reaction to a tragedy. It goes with Zombie's primal fury; slicker lyrics would have diluted the song's rawness."

Music critic Neil McCormick wrote that it was the Cranberries' "fiercest rock song... An accusatory lament, it grapples with the endless recriminations of the Irish Troubles, with a slow rolling bass line and thumping mid-tempo beat, finding tension between melodic delicacy and introspection in the verses with a keening, wailing chorus charged with distorted grungy guitars". Music & Media stated that it "combines moody soundscapes with some grunge-y guitar attacks that together make an arresting number". Mark Morris from Select wrote in his review of the album, "The surprise is 'Zombie', a Sinéad-like tantrum of crunchy guitars and confused lyrics about guns and bombs." Charles Aaron from Spin commented, "I like "Zombie" because its crunching, troubled guitar fuzz was the loudest thing on MTV during the last days of '94. Just ask Bono, my Irish Setter. He's still wailing." Josh Jones of Open Culture, described the "Gen X heyday"'s song, as "O'Riordan's stadium-size hit ... and its beautifully pained laments and pointedly unsubtle yelps and wails—a stunning expression of mourning that reverberates still some 25 years later". Martin Aston of Music Week wrote: "Having broken the UK on the back of their US success, the Cranberries continue to use their pop acumen to fashion wonderful, wistful pop nuggets. 'Zombie' is a little heavier and less user-friendly than 'Linger' and 'Dreams', but no less sublime for it." In 2018, Billboard and Stereogum ranked it number three and number two, respectively, on their lists of the top ten Cranberries songs.

On 16 January 2018, following O'Riordan's death, Colin Parry, father of IRA victim Tim Parry, thanked O'Riordan for the "both majestic and also very real lyrics". "Many people have become immune to the pain and suffering that so many people experienced during that armed campaign", he said. "To read the words written by an Irish band in such a compelling way was very, very powerful."

=== Criticism ===
Paul Brannigan of Louder writes, "Not everyone, however, was impressed by [O'Riordan's] credentials for the role of commentator on one of the most complex conflicts of the modern era." AllMusic said it "trivialised" the events of the Troubles, and that the "heavy rock trudge" did not play to the band's strengths. David Stubbs from Melody Maker said, "'Zombie' doesn't make a born-again fan of me, with its lethargic, samey, grungy riff lurching predictably towards anthem status. But I like Dolores O' Riordan's vocal, like Dana on heroin, all tattered, snarling and trembling at her wits' end." At the same time, Northern Irish band Schtum told Melody Maker, "She's from Limerick, what the fuck would she know? You're talking about the last 25 years of a much bigger and wider problem that has gone on for hundreds of years". Brannigan writes:

Schtum hailed from Derry, a city 224 miles away from Limerick by road, but one which may as well have been on a different planet to the rural village where Dolores O’Riordan was raised. When the singer protested "It's not me, it's not my family", explicitly distancing herself from the violence in Northern Ireland, and its overspill into England and elsewhere, she spoke the truth: no-one from her family was present at the Battle of the Bogside in Derry from August 12–14, 1969, for instance, or on January 30, 1972, when soldiers from the Parachute Regiment opened fire on civil rights campaigners in the city, killing 14 unarmed civilians in a massacre which came to be known as Bloody Sunday. Equally, her family had the good fortune to be untouched by any of the atrocities claimed by the Provisional IRA (or any other paramilitary faction) during her lifetime. So removed, in fact, was O’Riordan from events in Northern Ireland that, in her lyrics to Zombie, she references "tanks" on the streets, perhaps confusing Belfast with Beijing.

Iestyn George from NME felt "the timing of this release, as much as the sentiment itself, seems more than a little askew". Reviewing "Zombie" for Smash Hits, the pop-punk duo Shampoo gave it two out of five.

=== Accolades ===
On 23 November 1995, the Cranberries won the Best Song Award for "Zombie" at the 1995 MTV Europe Music Awards. In November 2022, it was voted as the greatest Irish hit of all time by RTÉ 2fm listeners in compiling the ultimate Irish playlist for a television special shown on RTÉ One.

=== As a sporting anthem ===
Following the death of O'Riordan in 2018, the hurling team from her home county of Limerick adopted "Zombie" as their anthem during their successful run to the All-Ireland Championship. It soon became a rugby anthem as well; Limerick-based Munster initially played it in tribute to O'Riordan, and crowd reaction led to it becoming a post-match staple.

The song was re-popularised in 2023 after it was played after Ireland games at the 2023 Rugby World Cup. It was picked up by fans of the Irish team, with videos of fans singing in chorus accumulating hundreds of thousands of views on social media. This offended Irish nationalists, who identified it as an "anti-IRA" anthem, and said that the lyrics failed to consider their experience during the Troubles.

Irish political leaders supported the use of "Zombie" as a rugby anthem. Taoiseach Leo Varadkar described it as "a song that we can all sing comfortably. It’s an anti-terrorism song. It’s not a nationalist or unionist song." SDLP leader Colum Eastwood wrote that "'Zombie' is an anti-war song written after the IRA killed 2 children in Warrington", adding that criticism of the IRA is not an endorsement of "British brutality", writing "Most of us opposed both".

The Warrington Wolves rugby league team, who play in the Super League, began playing "Zombie" from the 2025 season onwards as a club anthem at every home match at the Halliwell Jones Stadium, with the club granted endorsement to use it by the family of Tim Parry. Prior to a home season fixture during May, a cover was performed by Warrington band The Ambersons, with Wolves fans in attendance encouraged to sing from the stands.

"Zombie" was also the walkout music for mixed martial artist Jung Chan-sung, known as 'The Korean Zombie', throughout his time in the Ultimate Fighting Championship.

Aston Villa supporters have adopted a chant for Johan Manzambi, based on "Zombie," replacing the original refrain with “In your head, in your head, Manzambi, Manzambi, bi, bi."

== Commercial performance ==
"Zombie" topped the charts in many countries. On 29 October 1994, it went to No. 1 on the US Billboard Alternative Airplay chart, spending twenty-three weeks on the chart. In 1994, "Zombie" was "the most played song ever on alternative radio in the history of America", as mentioned in the Los Angeles Times and in Kenneth L. Campbell's book, Ireland's History – Prehistory to the Present. Junkee journalist Jules LeFevre recalled that Australian audiences were "particularly gripped by the song", with Triple J listeners voting for "Zombie" as No. 1 on the Triple J Hottest 100, 1994 chart, establishing for the first time ever that a female vocalist won the Triple J Hottest 100. On 18 December 1994, it reached No. 1 on the ARIA Singles Chart, where it remained for seven consecutive weeks. The single peaked at No. 1 and spent twenty eight weeks on the Official German Charts. On 25 December 1994, the single debuted at No. 27 on the Ö3 Austria Top 40, and climbed to No. 2, where it stayed for eight weeks. "Zombie" debuted on the French SNEP Top 100 at No. 4 on 25 February 1995. The following week, the single moved to No. 1; it spent nine consecutive weeks at the top and a total of forty-two weeks on the singles chart. The song reached No. 14 on the UK Singles Chart.

Island Records declined the prospect of releasing "Zombie" as a single to US stores, stating they didn't want to run counter to the band's original ethos. Music critic Jon Bream of Star Tribune elaborated succinctly the label's analysis: "For the band, it's a question of credibility". Bream said Island Records "simply didn't want the industry to typecast the Cranberries as a Top 40 act". Later in the year, the Cranberries affirmed their alternative identity, saying that they "didn't want to be considered just a pop band". Drummer Fergal Lawler said, "[t]hen you can go to the other extreme of being so alternative that no one buys your records. Luckily, we're kind of in the middle. We're a mix of pop, rock and alternative, I suppose." After O'Riordan died in January 2018, "Zombie" charted at number 13 on the UK Singles Downloads Chart.

In 2023, "Zombie" saw a sales surge in the UK and Ireland during the 2023 Rugby World Cup; it was played on speakers after every time the Irish team scored. "Zombie" reached number 11 on the UK Singles Downloads Chart during this time.

== Music video ==
"I remember going to Belfast, when we were filming and I went out with a camera when it was still a city under siege and had a gun pulled on me by a soldier. I was in places that I really shouldn't have been, but I was trying to immerse myself in what the Irish identity was about. The blood and the soul, the history and the pain of what that song was really about."

— Samuel Bayer, cinematographer and director, in December 2017 speaking of the filming of the music video for "Zombie".

=== Background and production ===
"Zombie" was released with a music video in October 1994. The video was directed by Samuel Bayer, produced by Doug Friedman of HSI Productions, and edited by Eric Zumbrunnen. The music video was filmed in Belfast, Northern Ireland, in the heart of the Troubles with real footage, and in Dublin. Bayer insisted on going to Belfast for authenticity regarding illustrating "something this visceral and intense". To record video footage of murals, children and British Army soldiers on patrol, he had a false pretext, with a cover story about making a documentary about the peace-keeping efforts in Ireland. Bayer stated that a shot in the video where an SA80 rifle is pointed directly at the camera is a suspicious British soldier asking him to leave, and that the IRA were keeping a close look at the shoot, given "the British Army come in with fake film crews, getting people on camera.” O'Riordan remembered Bayer telling her "how tense it was and how he was blown away by the whole thing. He got footage of the kids jumping from one building to another, and he got a lot of footage of the army. He was a very good director". O'Riordan also wanted to add images with "an abstract message", saying it would represent "the beauty that we see in the world or that we care to open our eyes to" while the black and white footage of Belfast "symbolize the pain that’s there and we close our eyes to". She suggested herself painted gold, and Bayer added children painted silver and a cross that "symbolized Christ suffering and dying, and all the pain that was caused to him". This was filmed on a sound stage in Los Angeles.

=== Synopsis ===
In the video, O'Riordan is covered in gold makeup and appears in front of a giant cross with a group of boys characterized as cherubs, covered in silver makeup holding bows and arrows. The video also includes the band playing in Belfast alongside clips of local children playing war games, destroyed buildings, murals with war-related paintings, and of British soldiers from the Argyll and Sutherland Highlanders on patrol in Northern Ireland.

=== BBC and RTÉ ban ===
The music video for "Zombie" was banned by the BBC because of its "violent images". It was also banned by the RTÉ, Ireland's national broadcaster. Instead, both the BBC and the RTÉ opted to broadcast an edited version focusing on footage of the band in a live performance, a version that the Cranberries essentially disowned. Despite their efforts to maintain the original video "out of view from the public", some of the initial footage prevailed, with scenes of children holding guns.

=== Reception and accolades ===
"Zombie" received heavy rotation on MTV Europe and was A-listed on Germany's VIVA in December 1994. The video gained a nomination for Best Alternative Video at the 1995 MTV Europe Music Awards. Writer Josh Jones commented that the video "offers a classic collection of 90s stylistic quirks, from Derek Jarman–inspired setpieces to the use of black and white and earnest political messaging". He added, "[f]or us old folks, it's an almost pure hit of nostalgia, and for the young, a nearly perfect specimen of the decade's rock aesthetics". On 23 October 2019, "Zombie" was ranked No. 5 on a "definitive list of the world's most-viewed rock music videos", released by Vevo.

On 18 April 2020, the official music video had succeeded in reaching over 1 billion views on YouTube and became the first song by an Irish artist, and sixth song from the 20th century to reach the milestone. Bassist Mike Hogan said of the achievement that "I can still remember making such a great video and seeing the impact that it had – and still does – on people". On 20 April 2020, the music video for "Zombie" remastered in 4K resolution was officially released for YouTube with previously unseen footage from the original video shoot.

== Live performances ==
A version of "Zombie" was already played one year before the release of No Need to Argue, on the band's first European tour with Hothouse Flowers, after the release of Everybody Else Is Doing It, So Why Can't We?. One such performance, recorded at the Astoria 2 in London in January 1994, seven months before "Zombie" was released as a single, would later be issued on the 2019 live DVD The Cranberries Live.

On 13 August 1994, two months prior to the release of No Need to Argue, the Cranberries performed at the Woodstock '94 music festival in New York. Towards the end of "Zombie", O'Riordan dedicated it to others, like the victims of ethnic cleansing, declaring that "this song is our cry against man's inhumanity to man, inhumanity to child", adding, "and war, babies dying, and Belfast, and Bosnia, and Rwanda".

The Cranberries kept "Zombie" in their concert setlists throughout their career. On 11 November 1994, the Cranberries featured as the musical guest on US talk show Late Show with David Letterman, performing the lead single one month after No Need to Argue was released. Junkee music editor Jules LeFevre, wrote that the footage captured "O'Riordan's extraordinary voice" and considered the live performance as "straight-up sublime".

On 14 February 1995, the band recorded a nine-song set including "Zombie", for MTV Unplugged, accompanied by Electra Strings, at the Brooklyn Academy of Music in New York City.

On 25 February 1995, the Cranberries played "Zombie" on their appearance on the US show Saturday Night Live, in a slow tempo performance that British author Dave Thompson called "one of the most powerful performances that the show has ever seen". The episode came a week after record producer Denny Cordell, an early mentor to the Cranberries, had died. Writer Ed Power wrote that the performance "has the rawness of early grief", while Rolling Stone would later declare it "one of the greatest SNL turns".

The band released a stripped-down version of "Zombie", recorded for Something Else, an unplugged album that features acoustic renditions of songs from their catalog, accompanied by the Limerick-based Irish Chamber Orchestra. The song appeared on the set list of their 2017 tour, featuring the Irish Chamber Orchestra's string quartet.

== Censorship ==
In March 2003, on the eve of the outbreak of the Iraq War, the British Government and the Independent Television Commission issued a statement saying ITC's Programme Code would temporarily remove from broadcast songs and music videos featuring "sensitive material", including "Zombie". Numerous media groups complied with the decision to avoid "offending public feeling", along with MTV Europe. Since it violated the ITC guidelines, "Zombie" was placed on a blacklist of songs, targeting its official music video. The censorship was lifted once the war had ended.

In August 2006, CBS censored a performance of "Zombie" by Rock Star: Supernova contestant Dilana, as a result of the lyrics and deleted all mentions of tanks, bombs and guns. Although CBS declined to comment, an employee claimed that it was "worried that the song might be seen as an anti-Iraq War statement".

== Formats and track listings ==
All tracks are written by Dolores O'Riordan except where indicated.

UK and European CD1, Australasian and Japanese CD single
No.	Title	Writer(s)	Length
1.	"Zombie"		5:06
2.	"Away"		2:39
3.	"I Don't Need"	O'Riordan; Noel Hogan	3:31

UK and European CD2
No.	Title	Writer(s)	Length
1.	"Zombie"		5:06
2.	"Waltzing Back" (live at the Fleadh Festival, 11 June 1994)		3:45
3.	"Linger" (live at the Fleadh Festival, 11 June 1994)	O'Riordan; Hogan	5:25

UK 7-inch and cassette single, US and Australian cassette single
No.	Title	Length
1.	"Zombie"	4:11
2.	"Away"	2:39

US CD single
No.	Title	Writer(s)	Length
1.	"Zombie"		5:06
2.	"Away"		2:39
3.	"I Don't Need"	O'Riordan; Hogan	3:31
4.	"Waltzing Back" (live at the Fleadh Festival, 11 June 1994)		3:45
5.	"Linger" (live at the Fleadh Festival, 11 June 1994)	O'Riordan; Hogan	5:24

== Charts ==
=== Weekly charts ===
Chart (1994–1995)	Peak position
Australia (ARIA)	1
Austria (Ö3 Austria Top 40)	2
Belgium (Ultratop 50 Flanders)	1
Belgium (Ultratop 50 Wallonia)	1
Canada Top Singles (RPM)	19
Denmark (IFPI)	1
El Salvador (El Siglo de Torreón)	2
Europe (European Hot 100 Singles)	2
Europe (European Hit Radio)	26
France (SNEP)	1
Germany (GfK)	1
Iceland (Íslenski listinn Topp 40)	1
Ireland (IRMA)	3
Israel (Israeli Singles Chart)	2
Italy Airplay (Music & Media)	6
Netherlands (Dutch Top 40)	2
Netherlands (Single Top 100)	3
New Zealand (Recorded Music NZ)	5
Norway (VG-lista)	2
Peru (El Siglo de Torreón)	6
Scottish Singles Sales (Official Charts)	9
Sweden (Sverigetopplistan)	2
Switzerland (Schweizer Hitparade)	2
UK Singles (Official Charts)	14
UK Airplay (Music Week)	38
US Radio Songs (Billboard)	22
US Alternative Airplay (Billboard)	1
US Mainstream Rock Airplay (Billboard)	32
US Pop Airplay (Billboard)	18
Zimbabwe (ZIMA)	1

Chart (2018)	Peak position
Austria (Ö3 Austria Top 40)	69
Canada Hot 100 (Billboard)	37
France (SNEP)	3
Hungary (Single Top 40)	29
Ireland (IRMA)	11
Italy (FIMI)	19
Scottish Singles Sales (Official Charts)	10
Spain (Promusicae)	6
Switzerland (Schweizer Hitparade)	20
UK Singles (Official Charts)	45
US Digital Song Sales (Billboard)	13
US Hot Rock & Alternative Songs (Billboard)	5

Chart (2026)	Peak position
Global 200 (Billboard)	78
Portugal (AFP)	116

=== Year-end charts ===
Chart (1994)	Position
Australia (ARIA)	38
Belgium (Ultratop 50 Flanders)	82
Iceland (Íslenski Listinn Topp 40)	31
Israel (Israeli Singles Chart)	6
Netherlands (Dutch Top 40)	90
Netherlands (Single Top 100)	37
Sweden (Topplistan)	40
UK Singles (OCC)	146
US Modern Rock Tracks (Billboard)	32

Chart (1995)	Position
Australia (ARIA)	7
Austria (Ö3 Austria Top 40)	7
Belgium (Ultratop 50 Flanders)	36
Belgium (Ultratop 50 Wallonia)	2
Europe (Eurochart Hot 100)	7
France (SNEP)	2
Germany (Media Control)	4
Netherlands (Dutch Top 40)	41
Netherlands (Single Top 100)	52
New Zealand (RIANZ)	17
Sweden (Topplistan)	26
Switzerland (Schweizer Hitparade)	7

Chart (2018)	Position
US Hot Rock Songs (Billboard)	80

=== Decade-end charts ===
Chart (1990–1999)	Position
Austria (Ö3 Austria Top 40)	62
Belgium (Ultratop 50 Flanders)	18
Netherlands (Dutch Top 40)	93

== Certifications and sales ==
Certifications and sales for "Zombie"
Region	Certification	Certified units/sales
Australia (ARIA)	Platinum	70,000^{^}
Austria (IFPI Austria)	Gold	25,000^{*}
Belgium (BRMA)	Platinum	50,000^{*}
Brazil (Pro-Música Brasil)	Gold	30,000^{‡}
Denmark (IFPI Danmark)	Platinum	90,000^{‡}
France	—	500,000
Germany (BVMI)	3× Gold	900,000^{‡}
Italy (FIMI) sales since 2009	2× Platinum	140,000^{‡}
New Zealand (RMNZ)	7× Platinum	210,000^{‡}
Portugal (AFP)	3× Platinum	75,000^{‡}
Spain (Promusicae)	2× Platinum	120,000^{‡}
United Kingdom (BPI)	4× Platinum	2,400,000^{‡}
^{*} Sales figures based on certification alone.^{^} Shipments figures based on certification alone.^{‡} Sales+streaming figures based on certification alone.

== Bad Wolves cover ==
"Zombie"

Single by Bad Wolves

from the album Disobey
- Released: 18 January 2018
- Genre: Hard rock
- Length: 4:15
- Label: Eleven Seven
- Songwriter: Dolores O'Riordan

Bad Wolves singles chronology
"Toast to the Ghost" (2017)	"Zombie" (2018)	"Remember When" (2019)

Music video
- "Zombie" on YouTube

The American heavy metal band Bad Wolves recorded a cover of "Zombie" in 2017 while they were working on their debut album Disobey. The band's singer Tommy Vext slightly altered the lyrics, inserting a reference to drones and replacing "since 1916" with "in 2018" to show that times haven't changed. Upon recording, the band were unsure regarding adding it to the album, with Vext declaring "The song is a masterpiece and a massive hit. Some art is sacred—you become afraid to do a rendition of it". On 21 December 2017, Vext met Dan Waite—the Internal managing director of Bad Wolves' record label Eleven Seven Label Group-Europe and a long-time close friend of O'Riordan—backstage at London's Wembley Arena at a heavy metal concert. Then he asked Waite to send her the cover for consideration as well as her approval for its release. Vext commented that "I just got the courage to ask him to send her the song to see if she would approve of it. It's always a jarring thing to take on someone's piece of work: especially as The Cranberries were a massive band, and 'Zombie' was probably their biggest song". On Christmas Eve 2017, Waite sent a text message to Vext that said O'Riordan had offered to "sing on it". Vext described the situation as "one of my childhood dreams come true", while the others musicians "almost didn't believe it".

On 14 January 2018, O'Riordan flew from her home in New York City to London. According to O'Riordan's agent, Lindsey Holmes, the primary purpose of her flight was for a studio mixing session on Monday and Tuesday with Martin "Youth" Glover for her side project's second album, and she was also due to meet with The Cranberries' record label BMG. On 15 January 2018, at 1:12 am GMT at her Mayfair hotel in London, O'Riordan left a voice message to Waite, where she expressed her thoughts, describing the cover as "awesome". She also invited Waite to come in the studio, slated for later that morning, and listen to the results of her vocals recording. O'Riordan was later found unresponsive in the hotel bathroom and confirmed dead at 09:16 am. Following her death, Bad Wolves said,

We are shocked and saddened at the news of Dolores' passing. [ ... ] We have always had deep respect for her as an artist and a vocalist and she was never afraid to bare her soul in her music and lyrics. 'Zombie' is an incredibly personal song and although we are a hard rock band, we always felt the rawness and honesty she projected on stage and in her recordings was something to which all bands should aspire to, regardless of genre. When we heard she liked our version and wanted to sing on it, it was the greatest compliment a new band, or any band for that matter, could have received.

Bad Wolves released the cover on 18 January 2018. The cover topped the US Billboard Mainstream Rock chart in May 2018 for three weeks and peaked at No. 54 on the Hot 100. In June 2018, at a concert in New York City, Bad Wolves donated $250,000 to O'Riordan's children. The idea of making a donation was set up by Allen Kovac, Eleven Seven Label Group founder, and former manager of The Cranberries.

In an interview, bassist Kyle Konkiel shared his thoughts on the new cover's sound:

[Our version] is kind of a darker more melodic feel than the original, which had a lot of heavy guitars and that legendary bassline and more focus on the actual instruments than the lyrics themselves.

— Kyle Konkiel.

=== Music video ===
The song's music video was directed by Wayne Isham. It begins with text discussing the cover's background and the passing of O'Riordan. The video then cuts to shots of the band performing the song in a black room, wearing black clothing and playing black instruments interspersed with close-up scenes of a woman (played by Ava Capra) being covered in gold paint to resemble O'Riordan in the original video. The woman also smears gold paint on a glass pane between herself and Vext, and after the guitar solo, she etches "1-15-18", the date of O'Riordan's death, into the paint. The video ends with a quote by Vext, "Her lyrics, confronting the collateral damage of political unrest, capture the same sentiment we wanted to express a quarter-century later. That is a testament to the kind of enduring artist Dolores was, and will remain forever."

=== Weekly charts ===
Chart (2018)	Peak position
Australia (ARIA)	26
Canada (Canadian Hot 100)	44
Canada Rock (Billboard)	7
Finland (Suomen virallinen lista)	15
France (SNEP)	66
Scottish Singles Sales (Official Charts)	28
Sweden (Sverigetopplistan)	94
Switzerland (Schweizer Hitparade)	48
UK Singles Downloads (OCC)	30
UK Singles Sales (OCC)	30
UK Independent (Official Charts)	27
UK Rock & Metal (Official Charts)	2
US Billboard Hot 100	54
US Hot Rock & Alternative Songs (Billboard)	5

==== Year-end charts ====
Chart (2018)	Position
Canada (Canadian Hot 100)	90
US Hot Rock Songs (Billboard)	9
US Rock Airplay (Billboard)	16

=== Certifications and sales ===
Region	Certification	Certified units/sales
Australia (ARIA)	Gold	35,000^{‡}
Canada (Music Canada)	5× Platinum	400,000^{‡}
Denmark (IFPI Danmark)	Gold	45,000^{‡}
France (SNEP)	Gold	100,000^{‡}
New Zealand (RMNZ)	Platinum	30,000^{‡}
United Kingdom (BPI)	Gold	400,000^{‡}
United States (RIAA)	3× Platinum	3,000,000^{‡}
Streaming
Sweden (GLF)	Platinum	8,000,000^{†}
^{‡} Sales+streaming figures based on certification alone.^{†} Streaming-only figures based on certification alone.

== Other notable covers ==
- In late 1994, a cover version by Spanish mákina group Ororo was released in conjunction with the original version. This version reached No. 1 in Spain and No. 16 in Austria.
- In 1995, a Eurodance cover version by Italian quartet A.D.A.M. featuring Amy reached No. 16 in the UK Singles Chart, No. 65 in Australia, No. 20 in France, No. 7 in Ireland, No. 9 in Italy, and No. 35 in Belgium.
- In 2011, Christina Parie covered the song on The X Factor Australia. After her performance, the song re-entered the ARIA Top 100 Singles Chart at No. 69.
- In 2017, Dutch hardstyle DJ Ran-D released a cover of the song on Armada Records which was certified gold in the Netherlands in 2019.
- In February 2018, the pop rock band Dreamers released a cover of the song.
- On 16 January 2019, to mark the first anniversary of O'Riordan's death, Chicago rapper Vic Mensa released a cover song through his punk-inspired band named 93Punx. On 27 April 2020, one week after The Cranberries music video reached one billion views on YouTube, 93Punx released their music video including their own live footage and interspersed with scenes from the original video.
- On 18 October 2020, American singer Miley Cyrus performed a cover of the song at NIVA Save Our Stages at Whisky a Go Go, a fundraiser concert streamed live on YouTube. Cyrus later on released her live cover to digital and streaming platforms and announced that the track would be one of the two (the latter being another viral take at Blondie's "Heart of Glass") covers that would be a part of her seventh full-studio album Plastic Hearts. The Cranberries expressed approval at Cyrus's version, posting on their official Twitter page that it was "one of the finest covers of the song that we've heard." Cyrus was flattered by the compliments, and stated the performance was inspired by her feeling like it was "really timely, even though it was a cover and maybe an older song, it just felt like it was super right now", adding that the lyrics "just really resonated" with her. The cover entered the Billboard Digital Songs at No. 34 and Hot Rock & Alternative Songs at No. 21, while also charting at No. 193 in France.
- In 2023, DJs and producers Illenium, Excision and Wooli made a remix of "Zombie" featuring vocals by Valerie Broussard. It reached No. 28 on the Billboard Dance/Electronic Songs chart.
- In 2024, Bambie Thug released a cover of "Zombie" as promotion for their Eurovision Song Contest 2024 performance, claiming the song was relevant to protest the Gaza war.
- In August 2025, a orchestral instrumental was used in the second season episode "If These Woes Could Talk" of the Netflix series, Wednesday, and was later released shortly after as part of the first half of the season's soundtrack. Later that month a cover by Bella Poarch was released in association with the series. Both version were later included on the series' official season two soundtrack.
- In July 2026, a 15-year-old Thai musician Nene Royal performed her rendition of "Zombie" in the audition of the America's Got Talent season 21. Her performance had 1.5 million views within 24 hours on YouTube, and 100 million views on different social media by the second day. NBC, producer of the talent show, announced her performance as the most-viewed video among all the season auditions.

== See also ==
- List of anti-war songs
