= Iestyn George =

Welsh journalist

- Occupations: Journalist, University lecturer
- Known for: NME, GQ

Iestyn George is a Welsh journalist, who previously worked as an editor at both NME and GQ and is now a lecturer at University of Brighton.

== Journalism career ==
During the 1990s, George was a writer for NME magazine, and became news editor. He became the marketing manager for Welsh band the Manic Street Preachers between 1999 and 2003. By 2001, George was also the music editor for GQ magazine, and became deputy editor at Golf Punk magazine.

He became editor of Rio magazine in 2009; it was the brainchild of Manchester United player Rio Ferdinand, who acted as editor-in-chief. He is presently the lecturer at University of Brighton.

== Personal life ==
Iestyn George is the son of Welsh broadcaster Beti George. He is the brother-in-law of Loaded co-founder and Golf Punk founder Tim Southwell.
