= Bad Wolves =

American heavy metal band

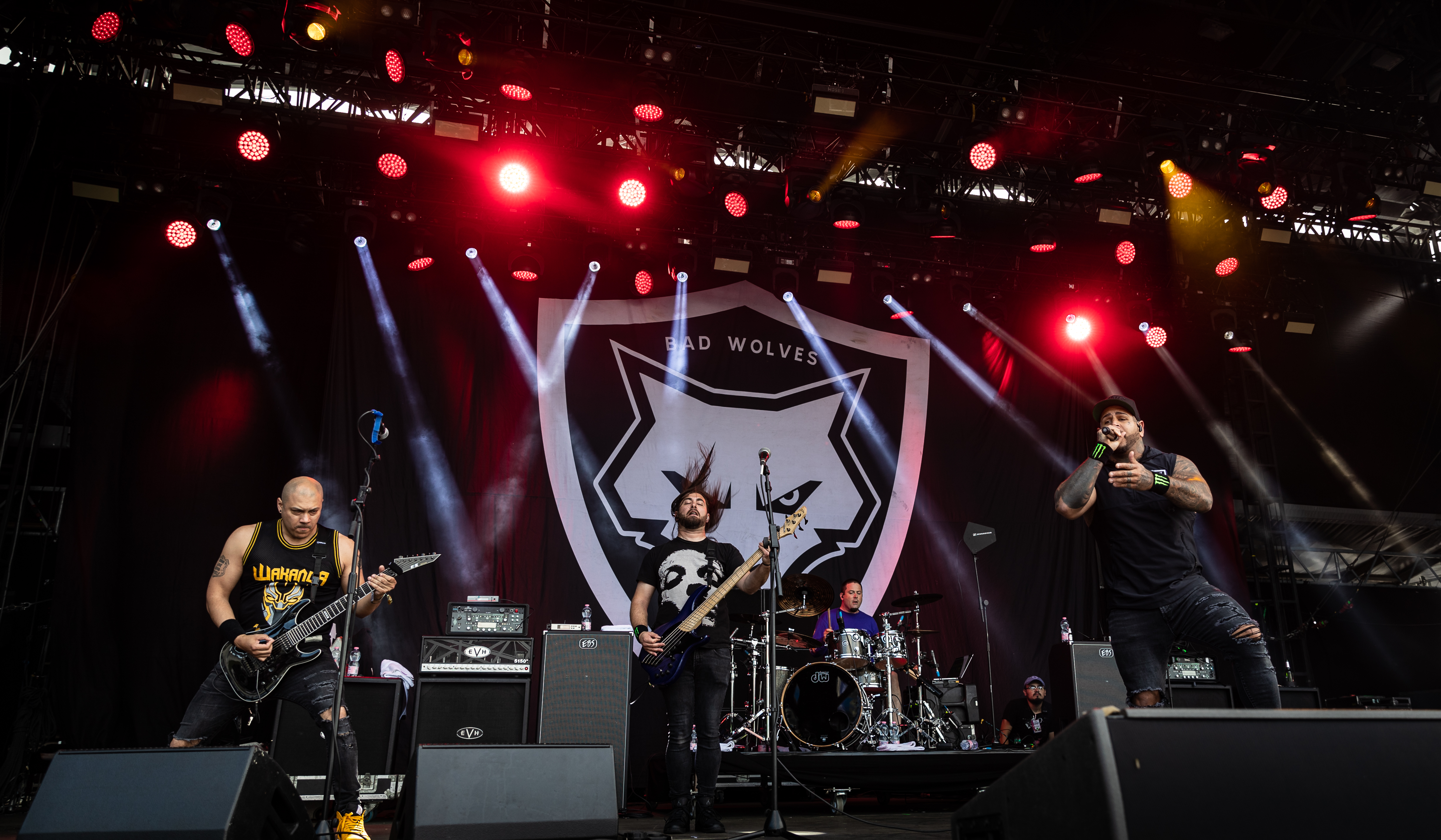
- Bad Wolves at Rock am Ring 2019

Background information
- Origin: Los Angeles, California, U.S.
- Genres: Alternative metal; djent; groove metal; hard rock
- Works: Bad Wolves discography
- Years active: 2017–present
- Labels: Better Noise; Eleven Seven
- Members: John Boecklin; Sara "Killboy" Skinner; Derek Bolman
- Past members: Chris Cain; Tommy Vext; Doc Coyle; Kyle Konkiel; Daniel "DL" Laskiewicz; Max Karon; Kevin Creekman; AJ Rebollo
- Website: badwolvesnation.com

Bad Wolves is an American heavy metal band formed in Los Angeles, California in 2017. Initially finding fame from their first single, a cover of the Cranberries' 1994 hit "Zombie", the band proceeded to find further success with a number of songs topping the Billboard Mainstream Rock Songs chart, including "Remember When", "Killing Me Slowly", and "Sober". The band has released four studio albums, Disobey (2018), N.A.T.I.O.N. (2019), Dear Monsters (2021), and Die About It (2023). In January 2021, original lead vocalist Tommy Vext left the band and was replaced by Daniel "DL" Laskiewicz. Tensions ensued between Vext and the band, resulting in legal proceedings including Better Noise Music. The band is currently undergoing lineup changes and is working on their 5th studio album. They recently announced the additions of Derek Bolman on bass and Sara “Killboy” Skinner as their new vocalist, making drummer John Boecklin the last original member remaining in the band.

== History ==
=== Formation and Disobey (2017–2019) ===
In July 2014, Boecklin started writing the music that would become the band's debut album and in 2016 entered AudioHammer Studios in Sanford, Florida, with producer Mark Lewis.

Bad Wolves was founded in 2017 by drummer John Boecklin (ex-DevilDriver), vocalist Tommy Vext (ex-Divine Heresy, ex-Westfield Massacre), lead guitarist Doc Coyle (ex-God Forbid), rhythm guitarist Chris Cain (ex-Bury Your Dead, ex-For the Fallen Dreams), and bassist Kyle Konkiel (ex-In This Moment, ex-Scar the Martyr, Vimic). They were managed by Zoltan Bathory of Five Finger Death Punch. The band announced that they would release their debut studio album, Disobey, on May 11, 2018. Of the thirteen songs in Disobey, ten were written and recorded before Vext joined the band.

In May 2017, Bad Wolves released their debut single, "Learn to Live". In November 2017, Bad Wolves released their second single, "Toast to the Ghost". On Christmas Eve 2017, the Cranberries' singer Dolores O'Riordan left a text message to her friend, managing director of E7LG-Europe, Dan Waite, where she offered to "sing on it", on the cover of "Zombie" that Waite had previously given her to listen to and accredit.

On January 15, 2018, O'Riordan — who was in London for a recording session for her side project's second album, left a voice message to Waite during that night, where she asked him to come in the studio later that morning, and to listen to her vocals on the cover of Bad Wolves. O'Riordan drowned in her hotel bathtub prior to recording it. On January 18, 2018, they released a third single, which was the cover of "Zombie" (originally by the Cranberries), which charted on multiple Billboard charts. The song peaked at number 23 on the Billboard 200, and reached number 9 in Australia. It topped the US Billboard Mainstream Rock chart. A music video was released on February 22. The band toured with Five Finger Death Punch, Shinedown, Breaking Benjamin, and Starset in the first half of 2018. In October 2018, the band launched a crowdfunding campaign to create a documentary about their formation and rise to fame. The film would be called "Breaking the Band". By the end of the campaign, they had raised under $15,000 of their $65,000 target. Despite this, the band received all the donated money and still intend to create something for the project.

Since their inception, the band has shared the stage with the likes of Five Finger Death Punch, Nickelback, Shinedown, Breaking Benjamin, Papa Roach and Nothing More. They also had their cover of "Zombie" nominated for the iHeartRadio's Rock Song of the Year.

=== N.A.T.I.O.N. and departure of Tommy Vext (2019–2021) ===
On July 26, 2019, the band released a new single titled "I'll Be There", followed by another single titled "Killing Me Slowly", a third single titled "Sober", as well as a fourth single titled "Crying Game" and announced their new album, N.A.T.I.O.N., which was released on October 25, 2019. "Killing Me Slowly" was a song written in collaboration with outside songwriters; however, Vext would later state publicly that he was "the mastermind behind the song" after changing a few lyrics.

Two new singles were released on April 10 on Patreon – a cover of "Heart-Shaped Box" by Nirvana and a new song called "Shanghai".

In an interview in October 2020, vocalist Vext confirmed that the band had almost completed their third full-length album and that they may release it six months early exclusively via Patreon.

On January 8, 2021, Vext announced his departure from Bad Wolves, with intention to launch his own solo career. On January 9, the band released an official statement saying: "It is true that Bad Wolves and vocalist Tommy Vext have parted ways. The four of us plan to continue making music and a new album is planned for later this year. Tommy has been a big part of Bad Wolves and we are grateful for his contributions". This followed a context in which his support for Donald Trump was criticized, as well as his criticism of Black Lives Matter." He stated that he was incited to leave Bad Wolves by the four remaining musicians and the label, Better Noise Music, over his conservative political views.

=== Hiring of Daniel "DL" Laskiewicz, Dear Monsters, and departure of Chris Cain (2021–2022) ===
On May 25, 2021, Tommy Vext claimed via his official Facebook account that Daniel "DL" Laskiewicz (former guitarist of The Acacia Strain) had joined Bad Wolves as their new lead vocalist. Vext followed this up by claiming that "the band is going to have to change its name if they don't pay for the songs I wrote and my trademark ownership but either way wish this dude the best I guess." The band did not respond to Vext's claims at the time. Just over a week later on June 2, 2021, Bad Wolves announced that Laskiewicz had indeed joined the band and that they were working on their third album called Dear Monsters, which they claimed would be "the best Bad Wolves album to date". The band also elaborated further on Vext's departure, saying that they "disagree with the validity of much of what he has said publicly about our parting of ways – but we would prefer to not look back on the past and instead focus on this new chapter. And most importantly, we'd like to let the music speak for itself." Laskiewicz was involved in the songwriting of N.A.T.I.O.N.

In July 2021, Doc Coyle stated on an episode of his podcast The Ex-Man with Doc Coyle that Vext's continued pressure against Bad Wolves meant that "a big portion of the fanbase has essentially been radicalized against the band under false pretenses." This came in the wake of a lawsuit filed by Vext against Bad Wolves manager Allen Kovac, who is also the CEO of Better Noise Music. In the lawsuit, Vext alleged that Kovac attempted to stop him from making political statements, attempted to buy the trademarks for Bad Wolves off him, tried to strong-arm radio and streaming services into not playing Bad Wolves when Vext refused to sell him the trademarks as a way of pushing Vext out of the music industry, and repeatedly using racial slurs to belittle him. Kovac responded with a statement of his own saying that Vext's accusations were "categorically false". Coyle and John Boecklin also made their own statement where they said that "In all our dealings with Allen Kovac, he has never used any derogatory racial slurs. Tommy is making all of this up. Period."

In late August 2021, Better Noise Music sued Vext for "copyright infringement, breach of contract and unjust enrichment".

The band released the first single from Dear Monsters, "Lifeline", on September 8. The album was released on October 29, 2021. Vext started a tour starting September 10 and billed himself with his solo band under "Tommy Vext and The B@D W8LV3S". On September 9, 2021, in a statement directed toward Vext, Bad Wolves wrote that "desperate people do desperate things", citing that Vext "can't write his own music" and that he had edited a version of the band's single, "Lifeline", with his singing voice on it that he circulated on the Internet. Bad Wolves cited initiatives Vext has taken since leaving the band in January 2021, including his GoFundMe, which was later shut down for fraud because he attempted to "dupe fans" by inciting them to buy an album of covers to which he does not hold the rights. Bad Wolves described Vext as "abusive − both emotionally and physically" while he was in the band and then afterward when he left it. The band also mentioned his "never-ending temper tantrums" on social media "filled with fraudulent claims and sad attempts to defame members of our band and our team". They said Vext had spread "mountains of lies", that he has "no moral compass", and is willing to do anything to achieve his ends. Vext did not respond directly to Bad Wolves but posted a clip from Avengers: Endgame on his social media, which summed up his sentiment.

On April 14, 2022, guitarist Chris Cain announced his departure from the band via Instagram. The following month, it was announced that Max Karon (of Once Human) had joined Bad Wolves as their new rhythm guitarist. Karon had previously worked with Bad Wolves on their first three albums. On July 28, the band released an EP titled Sacred Kiss.

=== Die About It and lineup change (2023–2026) ===
In 2023, Doc Coyle started touring with Ice Nine Kills, filling in for Dan Sugarman while on recovery from cancer. In July, Max Karon announced that he is no longer touring with Bad Wolves, but still helping with songwriting. On July 21, Bad Wolves released their first single, "Bad Friend", off their fourth album.

Near the end of January 2024, Bad Wolves officially welcomed former Issues guitarist AJ Rebollo into the band, with Rebollo having toured with the band in 2023 following the departure of Max Karon. Along with the announcement the band unveiled their new song, "Knife" which includes Rebollo's vocals as well.

On April 2, 2025, guitarist "Doc Coyle and bassist Kyle Konkiel departed the band. Former guitarist Chris Cain returned to the band, while Kevin Creekman, who appeared in the band's music video for the song "Killing Me Slowly", was announced as the band's new bassist. In June 2025, vocalist Daniel "DL" Laskiewicz joined Falling in Reverse as their touring bassist, leading to speculation about his continued involvement in Bad Wolves.

On June 29, 2026, Bad Wolves officially confirmed Laskiewicz's departure from the band.

=== New members, singles, and Rebollo's departure (2026–present) ===
On the same day as the band announced Laskiewicz's departure, the band introduced their new lead singer, Sara "Killboy" Skinner, and new bassist, Derek Bolman (ex-Sworn In), and released their new single "Paint It Red," along with a new music video.

Founding drummer and songwriter John Boecklin spoke about Killboy's introduction, saying "When we started looking for the next voice of Bad Wolves, we weren't looking for someone to fill a spot; we were looking for someone who could help push this band into its next chapter. The first time I heard Sara sing, I knew she was different," he continued. "She has an incredible voice, undeniable presence, and the kind of versatility that allows us to take our songwriting to places we've never gone before. Beyond the talent, she's brought a renewed energy and excitement into this band. Sara isn't here to recreate the past, she's here to help us build the future".

On August 31, 2026, Bad Wolves released a cover of Dolly Parton's song "Jolene". The band's manager stated the song was planned to be a duet with Parton and Killboy. On the same day, lead guitarist AJ Rebollo departed from the band, stating he had multiple “issues,” but the final straw was the cover of “Jolene.” He stated that he believed the band's label, Better Noise, had "ill intent" releasing it the week after Parton's passing.

Prior to Rebollo's statement and departure, the band was dropped off a tour with Skillet and Escape The Fate due to Killboy allegedly having an OnlyFans account. They were replaced on the tour by Autumn Kings.

== Musical style and influences ==
Bad Wolves has been described as alternative metal, groove metal, djent, hard rock, metalcore nu metal, and heavy metal in general, with elements of R&B, hip-hop, pop and even gospel. James Christopher Monger of AllMusic wrote the band "employs a lethal blend of melody and might that evokes names like Meshuggah, Mudvayne, and Sevendust." American vocal coach Ken Tamplin added, "Bad Wolves' musical style is rooted in heavy metal, characterized by aggressive guitar riffs, pounding drums, and intense vocals. They incorporate elements of various genres, including alternative metal, hard rock, and even some melodic influences". Dannii Leivers of Classic Rock described the band's debut album, Disobey, as balancing "well-drilled, hard rock anthemia with technically-charged metal."

== Band members ==
=== Current members ===
- John Boecklin – drums, percussion (2017–present)
- Sara “Killboy” Skinner – lead vocals (2026–present)
- Derek Bolman – bass (2026–present)

=== Former members ===
- Chris Cain – rhythm guitar (2017–2022, 2025–2026)
- Tommy Vext – lead vocals (2017–2021)
- Doc Coyle – lead guitar, backing vocals (2017–2025)
- Kyle Konkiel – bass, backing vocals (2017–2025)
- Daniel "DL" Laskiewicz – lead vocals (2021–2026)
- Max Karon – rhythm guitar (2022–2023)
- AJ Rebollo – lead guitar (2025–2026), rhythm guitar (2024–2025, 2026; touring 2023–2024), backing vocals (2023–2026)
- Kevin Creekman – bass (2025–2026)

Timeline

== Discography ==
Studio albums

- Disobey (2018)
- N.A.T.I.O.N. (2019)
- Dear Monsters (2021)
- Die About It (2023)
