= Bang Bang Romeo =

British rock group

- Origin: Armthorpe, England
- Members: Anastasia Walker; Richard Gartland; Richard Cook; Ross Cameron

Bang Bang Romeo were an English rock band from Armthorpe near Doncaster. The members are Richard Gartland, Anastasia Walker, Richard Cook and Ross Cameron. From 2018 to 2019, they supported Pink on her Beautiful Trauma World Tour, and Sting at the Montreux Jazz Festival in 2019. They headlined the Loud Women festival in 2021.

Walker is the daughter of actor Chris Walker.
