= Tommy Vext =

American singer

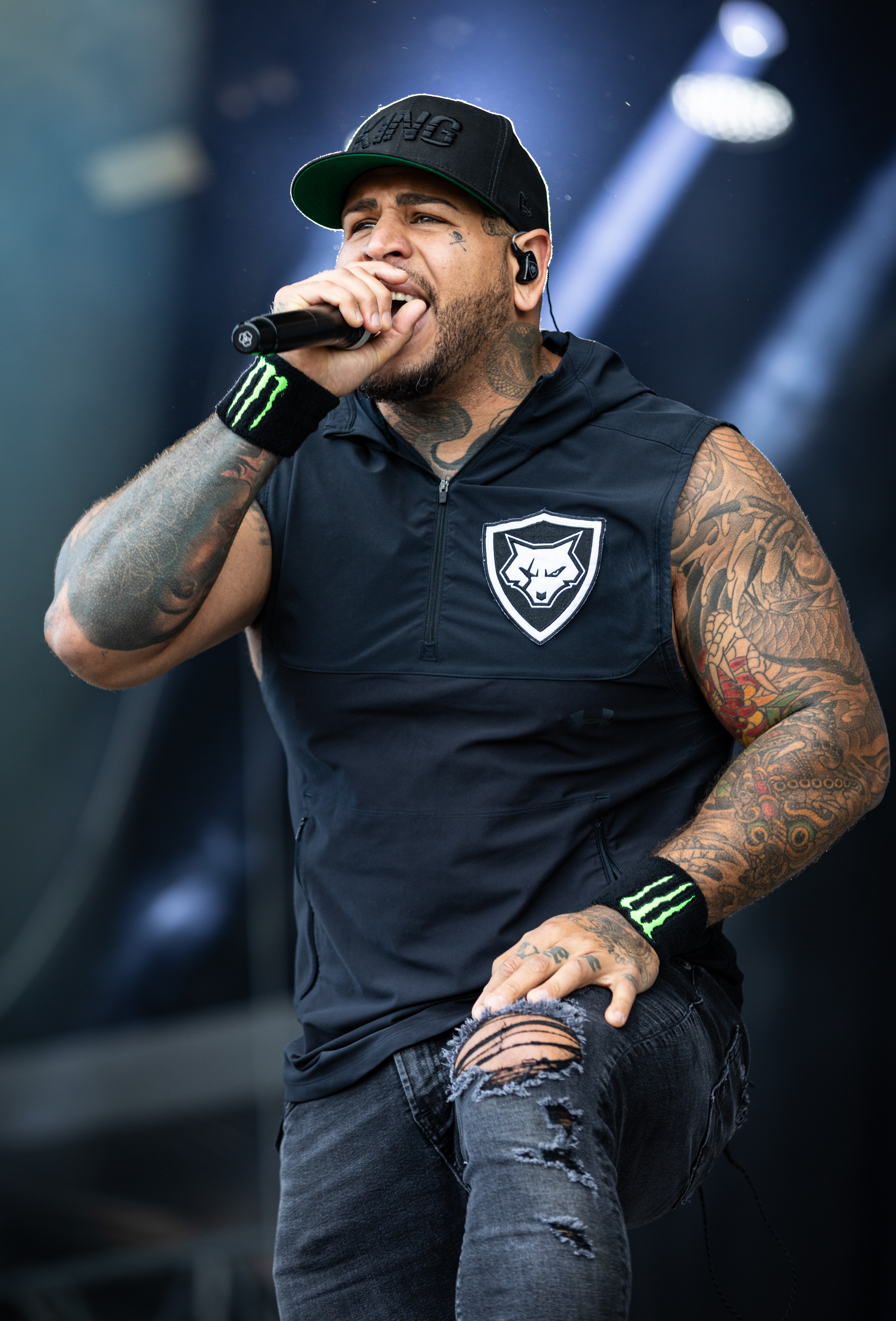
- Vext with Bad Wolves at Rock am Ring 2019

Background information
- Born: Thomas Cummings; April 15, 1982 (age 44); Brooklyn, New York, U.S.
- Genres: Groove metal; metalcore; alternative metal
- Occupations: Singer; songwriter
- Years active: 2000–present
- Member of: Ill Niño (touring) • With A Vengence
- Formerly of: Bad Wolves; Divine Heresy; Westfield Massacre; Snot

Thomas Cummings (born April 15, 1982), better known under the stage name Tommy Vext, is an American heavy metal singer known as the former lead vocalist of Bad Wolves, Divine Heresy, Snot and Westfield Massacre. He has also released several solo albums. He is currently the lead vocalist of the band With A Vengeance.

== Early life ==
Tommy Vext was born on April 15, 1982, and shortly after birth, he and his twin brother were abandoned at the hospital by their biological mother. Vext and his brother were raised alongside their adoptive sister, by their adoptive parents in Gerritsen Beach, Brooklyn. Their mother was a stay-at-home mom, and their father was a Vietnam veteran who worked in school systems.

During his adolescence, Vext began drinking alcohol and using drugs.

== Career ==
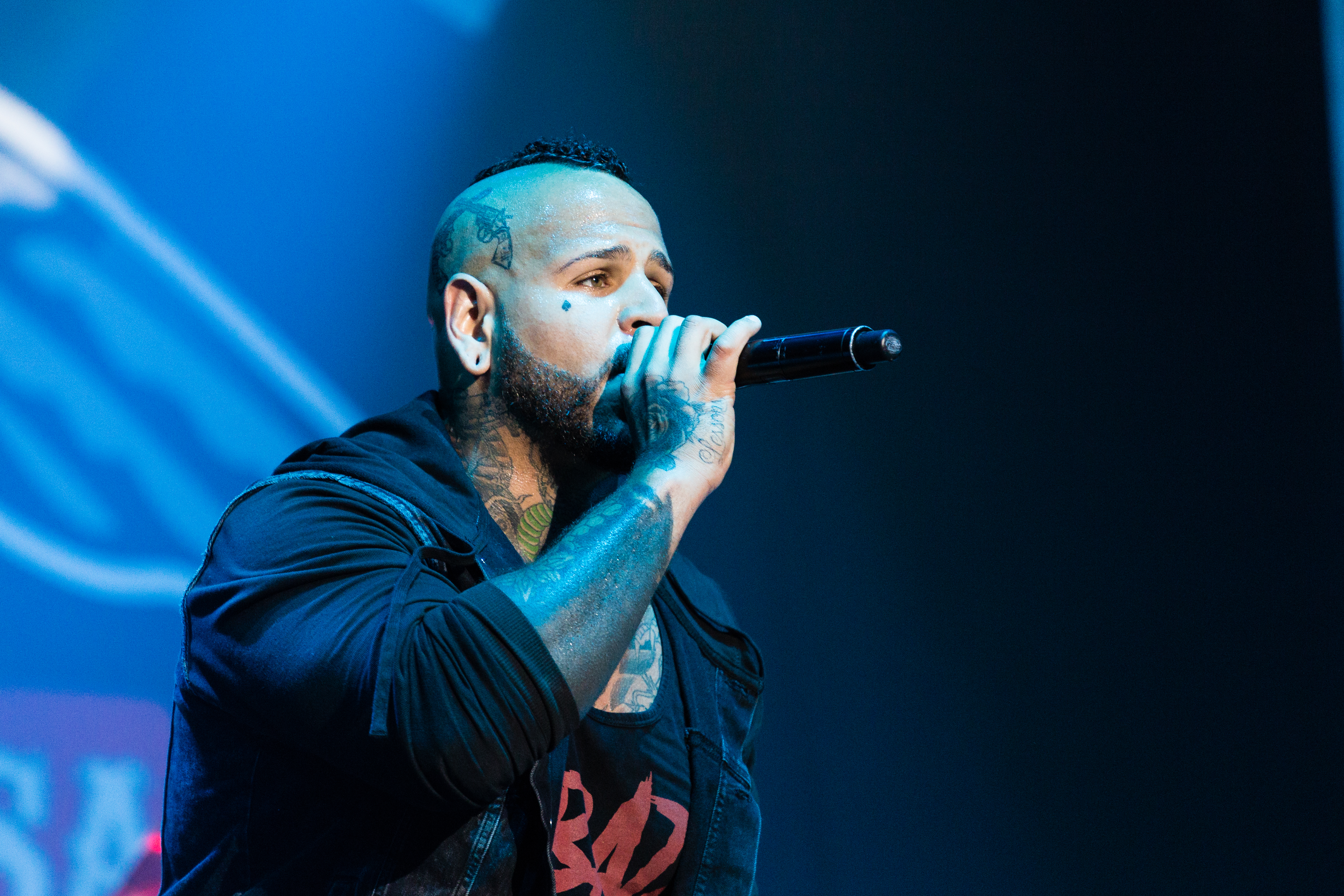
Vext performing at Nova Rock 2017

=== Early career ===
Vext began his music career in Brooklyn, New York as a teenager singing in local hardcore bands and engaging in freestyle rap battles with the neighborhood's preeminent hopefuls. Due to being underage, Vext had to sneak into clubs including for his own shows. In 1996, he formed the band Maniacal Disciple with friends Jim Donovan, Steve Perlmutter, and Mike Kontaras, eventually changing their name to "Vext" (a word he found in Wu-Tang Clan's lyrics), which eventually became his nickname after he started to be known as "Tommy Vext" in the New York hardcore scene. Vext was a local buzz band, playing shows at CBGB, The Continental, and Lamours. They also opened for Biohazard, Candiria, and many others. In 2005, at the Roadrunner Records 25th-anniversary show, Vext was invited to sing with Corey Taylor of Slipknot.

=== Divine Heresy ===
In 2006, Vext was recruited by Dino Cazares of Fear Factory to front his new band Divine Heresy. Their debut studio album Bleed the Fifth was released in the United States on August 28, 2007, through Century Media Records. The album was produced by former Machine Head and Soulfly guitarist Logan Mader.

Bleed the Fifth enjoyed a warm welcome from both the fans and the press. Dom Lawson of Metal Hammer summarized his review by saying "All in all, the portly pioneer has hit the bull's-eye and it's going to be fascinating to see what happens next", awarding an eight out of a possible 10. Eduardo Rivadavia of AllMusic felt the album "strikes a near-perfect balance between confirmation (reminding fans of Cazares' abilities and unique vision) and innovation (he even plays a few guitar solos!)". Scott Alisoglu of Blabbermouth.net summarized his review claiming the album is "one tough son of a bitch that may still have you humming melodies long after you've ejected the disc". Chad Bowar of About.com commented "Great musicianship, good songs and excellent production make this a very respectable debut".

Vext wrote the majority of the lyrics, which are about personal strifes and how people overcome them. Much of the lyrical content was influenced by the Book of Revelation, natural disasters, war, and terrorism.

In May 2008, Vext was fired from Divine Heresy after a physical altercation with Cazares. The split left both the fans and the press confused. In an exclusive Metal Injection interview, Vext explained the real reasons behind his departure from the band:

I've been suffering the indignities of Dino's massive ego for as long as I've worked with him, and unfortunately, everything I've heard about him had eventually come to fruition, and he is exactly as he's been portrayed as by his ex-band members. And this happening now is the same reason why he's not in Fear Factory anymore. It was a stepping stone in my life and I'm moving on.

— Tommy Vext

The whole band rejected his statement and responded by saying, "[i]t is unfortunate that our situation with Tommy Cummings has become so ugly. ... The decision to remove Tommy Cummings from Divine Heresy was not solely Dino Cazares'. It was a decision we made as a band".

In September 2014, Vext returned in a new version of Divine Heresy with drummer Tim Yeung.

Later bassist Joe Payne and drummer Tim Yeung both broke ties with Dino and on July 27, 2015, in an interview with MetalSucks, Cazares confirmed that he was the only remaining member of Divine Heresy.

=== Snot ===
Snot is an American metal band from Santa Barbara, California. Formed in 1995, the band released their debut studio album Get Some with founding vocalist Lynn Strait in 1997 and disbanded after his death in 1998. In 2008, the band reformed, with Vext on vocals. Snot has played a number of shows fronted by Vext, including a fall 2008 tour in the United States, supporting Mudvayne, 10 Years, and DevilDriver. When original guitarist Sonny Mayo left the band, Snot went on hiatus again.

On February 11, 2014, Snot reunited the second time at the Whisky a Go Go in Hollywood. This second reunion line-up once again featured Vext, Mayo, Doling, Fahnestock and Miller. They went on to play three more shows in the Southern California area before once again going quiet. Snot would go on again with another reunion incarnation but without Tommy Vext.

=== Vext ===
In 2011, Tommy Vext reformed Vext with members of Mutiny Within, (Bill Fore, and Andrew Jacobs); along with guitar virtuoso Angel Vivaldi. They released the EP titled Impermanence. in 2012. By 2013 Vivaldi and Jacobs had left the project, with Billy DiNapoli taking over on guitars. They released an EP titled Broke Is the New Black.

Tommy Vext then had gone on tour with Mayhem Festival 2013 as a cook, and moved to Los Angeles after the tour.

=== Westfield Massacre ===
After his stint with Snot, Vext moved on and formed a new band known as Westfield Massacre. Regarding the band's musical direction, Vext said: "There's definitely a traditional American metal vibe, but we blend power metal, melodic death metal, metalcore all together to get an original flavor to our sound." Westfield Massacre released their self-titled debut album on Urban Yeti Records 2016. In 2017, Vext began working on a side project with former DevilDriver drummer John Boecklin Vext left Westfield while he was on tour with Five Finger Death Punch.

=== Fill-in for Five Finger Death Punch ===
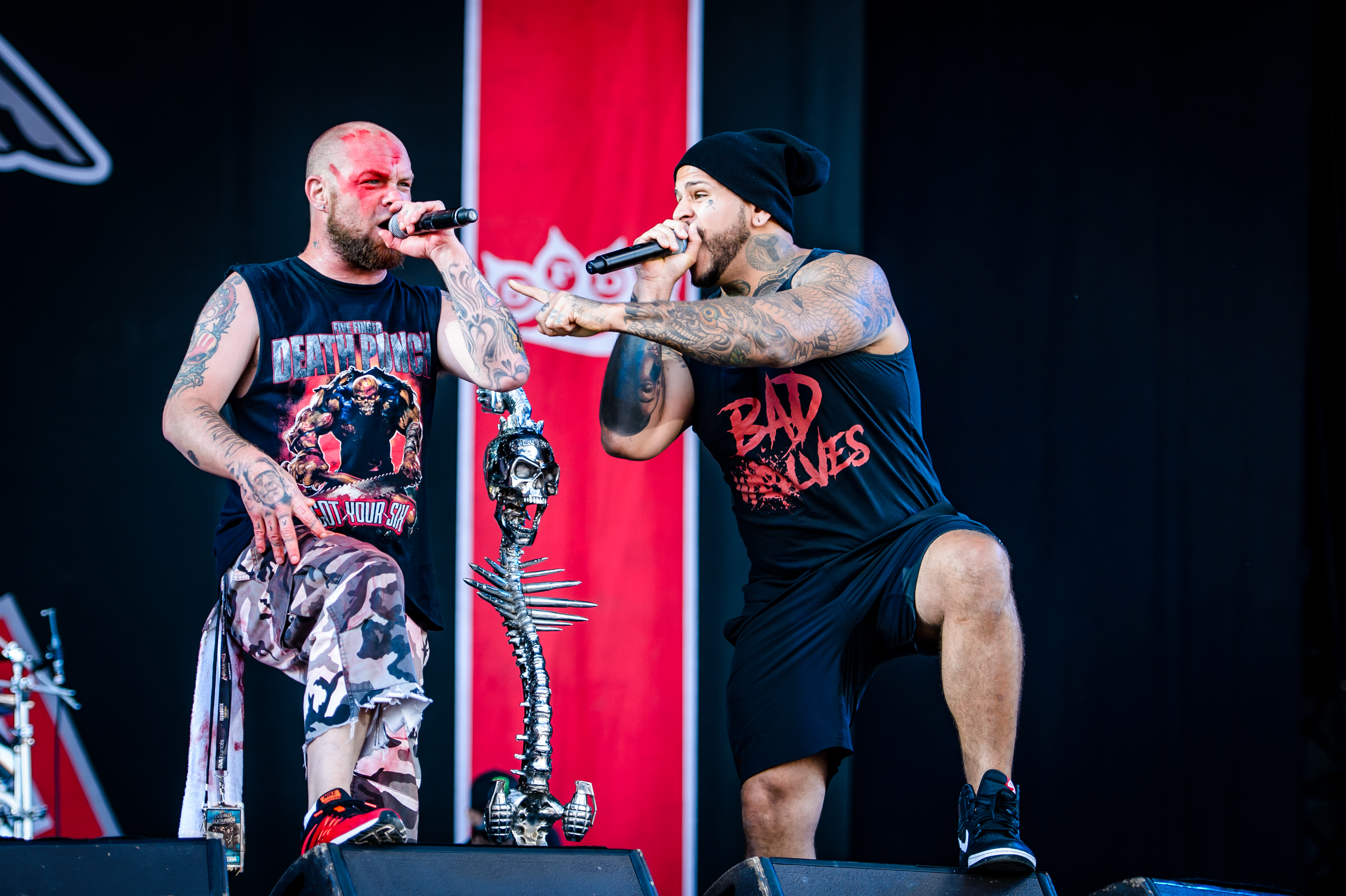
Vext (right) performing alongside Ivan Moody at Rock im Park in 2017

Vext filled in as the lead vocalist for the heavy metal band Five Finger Death Punch during their European Arena tour in 2017 when lead singer Ivan Moody left the tour to check into rehab.

=== Bad Wolves ===
In 2016, Vext formed a new band, known as Bad Wolves with former DevilDriver drummer John Boecklin. Guitarists Doc Coyle (Vagus Nerve, God Forbid) and Chris Cain (Bury Your Dead), and later, bassist Kyle Konkiel formerly of In This Moment were recruited for the project. During the summer of 2016, they entered AudioHammer Studios with longtime collaborator Mark Lewis (Trivium, All That Remains) and tracked what would become the group's debut studio album. On May 2, 2017, Bad Wolves independently premiered a song titled "Learn to Live" accompanied by a music video The video was streamed over 600,000 times. In November 2017, it was announced that Bad Wolves signed with Eleven Seven Music and Zoltan Bathory, the founding guitarist of Five Finger Death Punch, took them under his wings as the band's manager.

The band released their debut studio album, Disobey on May 11, 2018, through Eleven Seven Music.

The album reached number 23 on the US Billboard 200. In May 2017, Bad Wolves released their debut single, "Learn to Live". In November 2017, Bad Wolves released their second single, "Toast to the Ghost". On January 18, 2018, they released a third single, which was a cover of "Zombie" (originally by The Cranberries), which charted on multiple Billboard charts. The night of her death, Dolores O'Riordan left a voice message to her friend, record label executive Dan Waite, where she offered to "sing on it" on the cover that Waite had previously given O'Riordan to listen to and accredit. TMZ published this voice message on April 5, 2018. A music video was released on February 22. The song topped the US Billboard Mainstream Rock Songs chart, while the music video was viewed more than 170 million times. The single is certified platinum in Canada and the United States and gold in Germany.

The band toured with Five Finger Death Punch, Shinedown, Breaking Benjamin, and Starset for the first half of 2018.

Vext parted ways with Bad Wolves on January 9, 2021. Even though he originally said that he was "forced out by his former bandmates and record label", Vext came out with a public statement on January 11, 2021, stating that the choice to leave was all his. Vext came out against the violence associated with the Black Lives Matter riots during the spring and summer of 2020, expressing his concern about the United States and publicly endorsing then-sitting President Donald Trump. He's quoted as saying, "And for this they came for me... Cancel culture came after my band...However, this is my fight, I realize I cannot drag my band members or the people around me into this. I on my own decided to go solo..." The same day, John Boecklin and Doc Coyle responded to Vext's justifications during a live stream on Facebook, while not wishing to disclose anything about the reason for his departure, they indicated that it was not related to "cancel culture" or "his political beliefs". Boecklin said, "It was just past the point of going back".

After his departure from the band, Vext leaked on May 25, 2021, that Bad Wolves had chosen former The Acacia Strain guitarist Daniel "DL" Laskiewicz as their new vocalist. This was confirmed by the band just over a week later.

=== Solo career ===
After his exit from Bad Wolves, Vext started a GoFundMe campaign for a solo record of original music. He also started uploading a series of cover songs he recorded in 2020 onto his YouTube account, as well as announcing tour dates for a "Fuck Cancel Culture Tour" in April 2021. His GoFundMe campaign raised over $175,000 before Vext stated on March 15, 2021, that he would not be releasing it due to being "financially bullied into submission". He claimed that "the original album I made last year will either not come out or be given to another act on the label to perform as their own. Unfortunately fighting this would cost hundreds of thousands of dollars and take years to get resolved". He also stated that the covers album "is still sitting until the legal agreements can be signed off on but I'm excited to get those out to you guys as soon as I can."

In April 2021, Vext started selling his own 'Zombie Drops' brand of CBD oil.

At an appearance at FitCon in Salt Lake City, Utah, in June 2021, Vext alleged that his former bandmates were "frauds". He also reiterated his earlier claims that his music was being held hostage.

In July 2021, Vext filed a lawsuit against Allen Kovac, the manager of Bad Wolves and the CEO of Bad Wolves' label Better Noise Music. In the lawsuit, Vext accused Kovac of attempting to stop him from making political statements on social media, trying to buy the Bad Wolves trademarks from him, strong-arming radio and streaming services to stop playing Bad Wolves when Vext refused to sell him the trademarks in an attempt to push Vext out of the music industry and repeatedly using racial slurs against Vext to belittle him. Kovac later released his own statement saying that Vext's accusations were "categorically false" and that Vext "has dragged us into a ridiculous, unfounded narrative that falsely paints him as a victim."

On December 18, 2023, Vext released A.N.T.A.R.C.T.I.C.A exclusively on his app, tommyvextapp.com On February 2, he announced the album would be available on all streaming platforms on May 18, 2024.

Since August 2024, Vext has been touring with Ill Niño as vocalist, as a touring substitute for Marcos Leal. Leal departed the band the next month, and Vext has continued to fill the role until a permanent replacement was announced.

=== With A Vengeance ===
In 2026, Tommy Vext announced the formation of his new band With A Vengeance after failing to buy the rights to the Bad Wolves name. The lineup consists of Vext on lead vocals, as well as guitarists Chris Cain (formerly of Bad Wolves) and Angel Vivaldi, bassist Xander Raymond Charles, and drummer Austin D'Amond. The band released their debut single ‘’Shared Light’’ on July 17th 2026

== Personal life ==
In 2010, Vext's brother physically assaulted him with crowbar during a home invasion; leaving him with severe injuries including, a fractured skull, a broken forearm, and a ruptured spleen. Vext testified against his brother in court and his brother was sentenced to 17 years in jail for attempted murder. The incident led Vext to write a song about his brother called "Remember When".

== Awards and nominations ==
After plunging into drugs and alcohol in early 2009, Vext then decided to lead a sober life, and in 2014 founded a non-profit organization to help people suffering from the same addictions, with the aim of helping them find treatment. Vext received the Rock to Recovery 3 Service Award for his actions, held at the Fonda Theatre in Hollywood on September 15, 2018.

Bad Wolves reached platinum status in 2018 for their cover song "Zombie".

== Discography ==
=== Vext ===
- 2004: Cast the First Stone
- 2012: Impermanence (EP)
- 2013: Broke Is the New Black (EP)

=== Divine Heresy ===
- 2007: Bleed the Fifth

=== Westfield Massacre ===
- 2016: Westfield Massacre

=== Bad Wolves ===
- 2018: Disobey
- 2019: N.A.T.I.O.N.

=== Solo ===
- 2022: Grand Theft Audio
- 2022: Uncovered, Vol. 1
- 2022: Uncovered, Vol. 2
- 2024: Antarctica

=== Guest appearances ===
- God Forbid: Gone Forever (2004, guest vocals on the song "Soul Engraved")
- Jim Johnston - 2017: "I Bring the Darkness (End of Days)"
- Jelly Roll & Struggle Jennings - 2020: "Winds Of Change"
- Peyton Parrish - 2022: "Dane"

=== With A Vengeance ===
- Born To Survive - 2026

== Singles ==
List of singles as lead artist, showing year released and album name
Year	Title	Peak chart positions	Album
Year	Title	US Hard Rock Digi.	Album
2021	"Cancel the King"	15	Grand Theft Audio
2022	"Take Me to Church"	4	Uncovered
2022	"Trust the Science" (featuring Topher)	5	Grand Theft Audio
2022	"Strong for Someone Else"	—	Grand Theft Audio
2022	"Heart-Shaped Box"	17	Uncovered
2022	"The War You Wanted"	10	Grand Theft Audio
2022	"Hold the Line"	—	Grand Theft Audio
2022	"Faith Over Fear" (featuring Rob Bailey)	—	Grand Theft Audio
2023	"Crawling"	—	Grand Theft Audio
2023	"Closure"	—	
2023	"Face Breaker"	—	
2023	"Failed Creation"	—	
2023	"This Threat Is Real"	—	
2023	"Impossible Is Nothing"	—	
2023	"Bleed the Fifth"	—	
2023	"Terrible Things"	—	Antarctica
2024	"Gods and Monsters" (featuring Chris "CJ" McMahon)	—	Antarctica
2024	"Smoking Gun"	—	Antarctica

== Music videos ==
Title	Year	Director
"Trust the Science"	2022	Austin Scherzberg, Michael Levine
"Cancel the King"	2022	Austin Scherzberg, Michael Levine
"Heart-Shaped Box"	2022	Michael Levine
"Strong for Someone Else"	2022	Unknown
"The Hills"	2022	Michael Levine, Eric Black
"Cry Me a River"	2022	Michael Levine, Eric Black
"The War You Wanted"	2022	Unknown
"Hollywood's Bleeding"	2022	Michael Levine, Eric Black
"Grand Theft Audio"	2022	Unknown
"Runaway"	2022	Austin Scherzberg
"Civil War"	2022	Unknown
"Crawling"	2023	Unknown
"Face Breaker"	2023	Austin Scherzberg
"Tennessee Whiskey"	2023	Unknown
"Terrible Things"	2023	Austin Scherzberg
"Gods and Monsters"	2024	Austin Scherzberg
"America Meant To Me"	2024	Unknown
"Smoking Gun"	2024	Tommy Vext

== Filmography ==
- Emmure – "10 Signs You Should Leave" (music video, 2007)
- Twinkle Twinkle Little Star (short film, 2016) (as Drug Dealer)
