= Better Noise Music =

American record label

- Parent company: Better Noise Entertainment
- Founded: 2006 as Eleven Seven Music
- Founder: Allen Kovac
- Distributor: FUGA (Downtown Music Holdings) (worldwide)
- Genre: Hard rock; heavy metal; indie rock; alternative rock; nu metal
- Country of origin: United States
- Location: New York City, New York, Los Angeles, California, Nashville, Tennessee; Miami, Florida, Toronto, Canada; London, England; Berlin, Germany; Sydney, Australia
- Official website: betternoise.com

Better Noise Music is an American record label founded in 2006 by Allen Kovac, CEO of 10th Street Entertainment. The label was previously known as Eleven Seven Label Group with Eleven Seven, Five Seven and Better Noise Records as imprints. They are an artist development label, developing new bands in the rock music genre. The label recently announced an expanded alliance with FUGA and was named 2019 Active Rock Label of the Year for the second consecutive year. In early 2020, Kovac launched sister company, Better Noise Films.

The Eleven Seven Music label was the home of recording artists Papa Roach, and others.

== History ==
Eleven Seven Label Group

Eleven Seven Label Group was founded in 2006 by Allen Kovac, CEO of 10th Street Entertainment, as the American parent company of a group of rock and alternative rock record labels. It is seen as a successor to Kovac's earlier label, Beyond Music, which existed between 1998 and 2002.

Eleven Seven Label Group was named Billboard magazine's Rock Label of the Year in 2010.

In 2009, Eleven Seven Label Group created an alternative/indie sub-label called Five Seven Music for alternative rock bands such as Just Loud, Bleeker, Romes and Dirty Heads. The latter had three Top five Billboard alternative chart albums. Better Noise Records, another home for hard rock acts, was founded in 2015 as part of Eleven Seven.

Eleven Seven expanded its base from New York City and Los Angeles, with the opening of international offices in Toronto, Canada and London, England in 2012, Sydney, Australia and Berlin, Germany in 2019, Paris, France in 2020 and Nashville, Miami in 2021. The company entered into a global partnership with Marshall Records in 2018 in order to bring Marshall artists to North and South America via Eleven Seven's distribution system.

In October 2019, Eleven Seven Label Group rebranded all the labels under the umbrella (Eleven Seven, Five Seven and Better Noise) to the new name of Better Noise Music, and all releases since have been released under the label Better Noise Music. Two months later, it signed a global marketing and distribution deal with FUGA, the Netherlands-based subsidiary of AVL Digital Group (itself a subsidiary of Downtown).

In May 2023, Allen Kovac became Chairman of Better Noise, moving up President Dan Waite to the CEO position, and Steve Kline from COO to President/COO.

== Roster ==
=== Current ===
- Against the Current (band)
- All Good Things
- As Lions
- Asking Alexandria
- Atlas Genius
- Awolnation
- Bad Wolves
- Bleeker
- Cory Marks
- Classless Act
- Crossbone Skully
- Crossfade
- Deuce
- Dirty Heads
- Eva Under Fire
- Finish Ticket
- Finger Eleven
- Fire from the Gods
- Five Finger Death Punch
- The Funeral Portrait
- From Ashes to New
- The Hu
- Hyro the Hero
- In This Moment
- Nevrlands
- Nothing More
- The Rasmus
- Rews (Marshall Records distribution deal)
- Sabaton
- Solence
- The Red Jumpsuit Apparatus
- Tempt
- Danny Worsnop
- Yellowcard

=== Former ===
- Anavae
- Apocalyptica
- Art of Dying
- Attica Riots
- Bang Bang Romeo
- Blondie
- Buckcherry
- CAVO
- Charm City Devils
- Cold
- Debbie Harry
- Diamante
- Drowning Pool
- Escape the Fate
- The Exies
- Hellyeah
- In Flames
- Islander
- Jason Hook
- Marion Raven
- Mötley Crüe (as the distributor of Mötley Records)
- My Secret Circus
- Papa Roach
- Pop Evil
- Press to MECO (Marshall Records distribution)
- Rews (Marshall Records distribution)
- Romes
- Sixx:A.M.
- Trapt
- Tommy Vext
