= Nothing More discography =

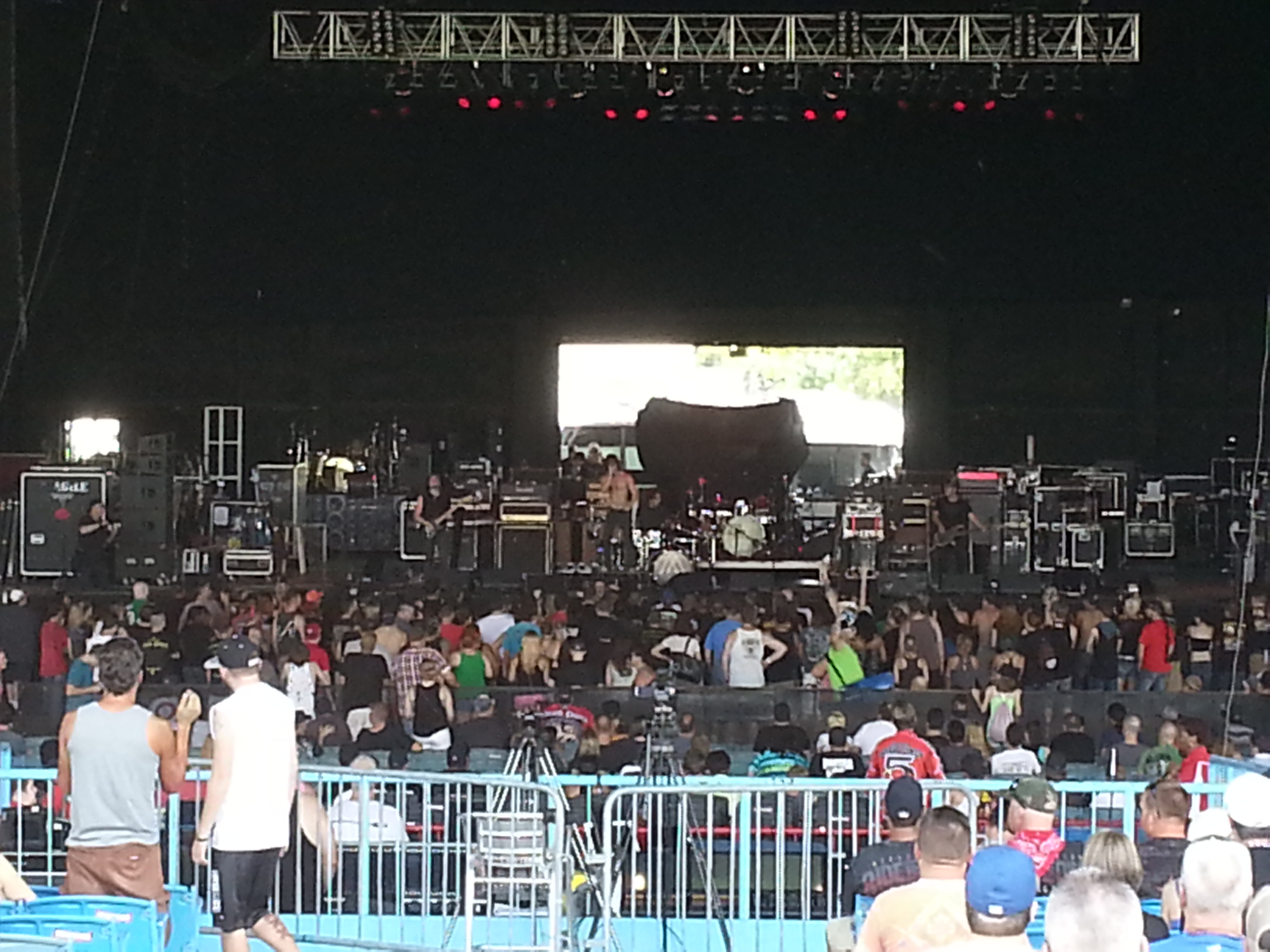
- Nothing More performing in 2014
- Studio albums: 6
- EPs: 1
- Compilation albums: 1
- Singles: 14
- Music videos: 19

The discography of American rock band Nothing More consists of six studio albums, one compilation album, one extended play, eight singles, and twelve music videos. While recording a number of lower profile independent releases through the 2000s, the band did not receive widespread attention for their releases until signing to the Eleven Seven record label in 2014. Since then, the band has had two studio albums that charted on the Billboard 200 all-format charts, Nothing More (2014) and The Stories We Tell Ourselves (2017). Additionally, the band has had eleven charting singles on the Billboard Mainstream Rock songs chart, including "Go to War", which topped the chart for a week in November 2017, "If It Doesn't Hurt" in June 2024, "Angel Song" in November 2024 "House on Sand" in May 2025, and "Freefall" in August 2025.

== Albums ==
=== Studio albums ===
Title	Album details	Peak chart positions						Sales
Title	Album details	US	US Alt.	US Digital	US Hard Rock	US Indie	CAN	Sales
Shelter	Released: August 1, 2004; Label: self-released; Formats: CD, digital download	—	—	—	—	—	—	
Save You/Save Me	Released: January 5, 2007; Label: Vestia Entertainment; Formats: CD, digital download	—	—	—	—	—	—	
The Few Not Fleeting	Released: February 21, 2009; Label: Vestia Entertainment; Formats: CD, digital download	—	—	—	—	—	—	
Nothing More	Released: June 11, 2013 (original), June 24, 2014 (re-release); Label: Arms Division (original), Eleven Seven (re-release); Formats: CD, vinyl, digital download	33	11	19	3	8	—	
The Stories We Tell Ourselves	Released: September 15, 2017; Label: Better Noise Music; Formats: CD, vinyl, digital download	15	3	4	2	2	67	
Spirits	Released: October 14, 2022; Label: Better Noise Music; Formats: CD, vinyl, digital download	—	—	—	—	—	—	
Carnal	Released: June 28, 2024; Label: Better Noise Music; Formats: CD, vinyl, digital download	153	—	—	—	—	—	US: 90,000
"—" denotes a recording that did not chart or was not released in that territory.

== Compilation albums ==
Title	Album details
Vandura	Released: May 11, 2006; Label: self-released; Formats: CD, digital download

== Extended plays ==
Title	Album details
Madhatter's Bliss	Released: July 12, 2005; Label: self-released; Formats: CD, digital download

== Singles ==
Title	Year	Peak chart positions						Certifications	Album
Title	Year	US Main.	US Rock	US Rock Air.	US Hard Rock Digi.	US Hot Hard Rock	CAN Rock	Certifications	Album
"Gone"	2009	—	—	—	—	—	—		The Few Not Fleeting
"Waiting on Rain"	2009	—	—	—	—	—	—		The Few Not Fleeting
"This is the Time (Ballast)"	2014	2	30	18	—	—	—		Nothing More
"Mr. MTV"	2014	12	—	42	—	—	—		Nothing More
"Jenny"	2015	6	31	25	—	—	—	RIAA: Gold	Nothing More
"Here's to the Heartache"	2015	4	46	21	—	—	—		Nothing More
"Go to War"	2017	1	23	12	—	—	49	RIAA: Gold	The Stories We Tell Ourselves
"Do You Really Want It?"	2017	6	—	25	—	—	—		The Stories We Tell Ourselves
"Just Say When"	2018	8	—	37	—	—	—		The Stories We Tell Ourselves
"Let 'Em Burn"	2018	12	—	36	—	—	—		The Stories We Tell Ourselves
"Tired of Winning"	2022	5	—	20	—	25	—		Spirits
"You Don't Know What Love Means"	2022	14	—	34	—	—	—		Spirits
"If It Doesn't Hurt"	2024	1	—	7	1	8	9		Carnal
"House on Sand" (feat. Eric Vanlerberghe)	2024	1	—	13	10	11	—		Carnal
"Angel Song" (feat. David Draiman)	2024	1	—	10	—	9	29		Carnal
"Freefall" (original or feat. Chris Daughtry)	2025	1	—	16	—	18	—		Carnal
"—" denotes a single that did not chart or was not released in that territory.

=== As featured artist ===
Title	Year	Peak chart positions		Artist	Album
Title	Year	US Main.	US Rock Air.	Artist	Album
"Crossing the Rubicon"	2025	10	43	Sabaton	Legends
"Lost Soul"	2026	13	—	The Hu	HUN

=== Promotional singles ===
Title	Year	Peak chart positions	Album
Title	Year	US Hot Hard Rock	Album
"This Is the Time (Ballast) (Acoustic)"	2014	—	Non-album single
"Don't Stop" (feat. Jacoby Shaddix)	2017	—	The Stories We Tell Ourselves
"Who We Are"	2017	—	The Stories We Tell Ourselves
"Turn It Up Like (Stand in the Fire)"	2022	—	Spirits
"Spirits"	2022	—	Spirits
"Best Times" (feat. Lacey Sturm)	2022	—	Spirits
"Stuck" (feat. Sinizter)	2024	20	Carnal

== Music videos ==
Year	Song	Director
2014	"This is the Time (Ballast)"	Frankie Nasso
2014	"Mr. MTV"	Sean McLeod
2015	"Jenny"	Jonny Hawkins
2015	"Here's to the Heartache"	Josh Sobel
2017	"Go to War"	Wayne Isham
2017	"Don't Stop" (feat. Jacoby Shaddix)	Unknown
2017	"Do You Really Want It?"	Frankie Nasso
2018	"Just Say When"	Daniel Cummings
2018	"Let 'Em Burn"	Ben Roberds
2019	"Fade In / Fade Out"	Stephen Wayne Mallett
2022	"Turn It Up Like (Stand In The Fire)"	Robyn August
2022	"Tired Of Winning" / "Ships In The Night"	Robyn August
2022	"You Don't Know What Love Means"	Robyn August
2022	"Best Times"	Robyn August
2023	"Best Times" (feat. Lacey Sturm)	Michael Lombardi
2024	"If It Doesn't Hurt"	Orie McGinness
2024	"Carnal" / "House On Sand" (feat. Eric Vanlerberghe)	Unknown
2024	"Angel Song" (feat. David Draiman)	Orie McGinness
2024	"Stuck" (feat. Sinizter)	Christian Lawrence
2025	"Freefall" (feat. Chris Daughtry)	Stephen Wayne Mallett
2025	"Existential Dread"	Unknown
