= You Don't Know What Love Means =

Single by Nothing More

from the album Spirits
- Released: August 12, 2022
- Genre: Alternative rock
- Length: 4:08
- Label: Better Noise Music

Nothing More singles chronology
"Tired of Winning" (2022)	"You Don't Know What Love Means" (2022)	"If It Doesn't Hurt" (2024)

Music video
- "You Don't Know What Love Means" on YouTube

"You Don't Know What Loves Means" is a song by American rock band Nothing More. It was their second single off of their album Spirits. It peaked at number 14 on the Billboard Mainstream Rock chart in 2022.

== Background ==
"You Don't Know What Love Means" was released on August 12, 2022, as the second official single off of their album Spirits, and third song overall, after promotional song "Turn It Up (Standing in the Fire) and first single "Tired of Winning". A music video for the song released at the same time. As of December 2022, the song had peaked at number 14 on the Billboard Mainstream Rock Songs chart.

== Themes and composition ==
Frontman Jonny Hawkins described the song as representative of the "emotional" and "intimate" side of the Spirits album, in the same vein of "Go to War" on The Stories We Tell Ourselves (2017) and "Jenny" from Nothing More (2014). The song's lyrics explore the struggles of trying to make a one-sided romantic relationship work.

== Personnel ==
Band

- Jonny Hawkins – lead vocals
- Mark Vollelunga – guitar
- Daniel Oliver – bass, keyboards
- Ben Anderson – drums

== Charts ==
Chart (2022)	Peak position
US Mainstream Rock (Billboard)	14
