= Paco Estrada =

American musician

- Born: April 18, 1980 (age 46)
- Genres: Hard rock; alternative rock; post-grunge; soul; R&B; hip-hop
- Occupation: Musician
- Instruments: Vocals; guitar
- Label: Reckless Love
- Member of: SouthFM; Heart of the City
- Formerly of: Paco Estrada & One Love; SPCCMP
- Website: pacoestrada.bandcamp.com

Francisco "Paco" Estrada III (born April 18, 1980) is a singer-songwriter based in Dallas, Texas. He is known for his powerful and emotive vocal delivery, deeply personal lyrics, and blending of various musical styles. For the past twenty-five years he has been an influential presence within several genres in the Texas music scene. From 1999 to 2006, and again from 2014 onward he has fronted the alternative rock band SouthFM. He also fronted the alternative soul band Paco Estrada & One Love from 2008 to 2012 and co-fronted the hip-hop group SPCCMP from 2012 to 2015. Paco has also fronted the band Heart of the City since 2017. Estrada has released four albums and an EP under his own name and has also collaborated on songs with a variety of artists, notably San Antonio-based hard rock band Nothing More, with whom he has co-written multiple top 10 charting singles on three of their albums, including the Grammy-nominated The Stories We Tell Ourselves.

== Early life ==
Paco was born in Dallas, Texas, the only son of Francisco and Mara Estrada. His father was a minister, and his mother majored in music in college. Paco and his three older sisters sang in the church choir. From an early age Paco joined his family in musical performances at their church. Paco’s mother bought him his first guitar, a Hondo acoustic, and Paco formed his first band when he was a teenager. While attending Bryan Adams High School, Paco’s music teacher introduced him to the music of Boyz II Men, and Paco was also enamored with grunge bands such as Soundgarden and Pearl Jam. These influences melded into the blend of soul and alternative rock which has pervaded Estrada’s musical output throughout his career.

== SouthFM (1999–2006) ==
In 1999 Paco formed SouthFM with guitarists G.I. Sanders and Chad Abbott, bassist Doug McGrath and drummer Spencer Estep. Their early sound was influenced by alternative metal bands Tool, Deftones, and Failure. After convincing executives from Dallas-based label Brando Records to attend one of their shows, the band was brought by Brando to major label MCA Records, who released their 2003 debut album Drama Kids, which included the single "Dear Claudia". The song became a radio hit, and was featured in an episode of the popular television program Law & Order SVU. SouthFM won the 2003 Dallas Observer Music Award for best Rock/Pop act and the band embarked on a nationwide tour with Brando labelmates Blue October. However, the timing of the band’s signing with MCA proved ill-fated, as that summer the label was phased out amid declining sales and staff layoffs. Some MCA artists were merged into MCA’s sister label Geffen Records, but most, including SouthFM, were dropped.

SouthFM released their second album Swallowing the Pill on Brando Records in 2005. With Drama Kids, the band felt they had written a great hit song in “Dear Claudia”, but with Swallowing the Pill they focused on creating a full album of great songs. They softened the influence from their initial metal roots, and embraced a more eclectic sound while still remaining true to the alternative rock format. The album was viewed by critics as a leap forward in terms of depth and maturity, however in the Fall of 2006, following months of touring, the band played their final show.

== Paco Estrada & One Love (2009–2012) ==
During his time in SouthFM, Paco’s musical interests broadened from his early hard rock and metal influences, and he began taking his songwriting in a more pop and soul oriented direction. Influenced by artists such as Justin Timberlake, Ryan Adams, Gnarls Barkley, Damien Rice, Dan Dyer, and Ezra Vancil, he started writing songs in a style he dubbed “alternative soul” and by 2009 had formed a new band called Paco Estrada & One Love. In addition to Estrada’s unique vocals, which were described as CeeLo Green meets Kings of Leon, One Love was notable for featuring electric violin and cajon in lieu of the standard guitars and drums setup of a traditional rock band. The group released the album The Anatomy of Letting Go in 2009, and released their final concert as the live album Letting Go: The Farewell Show in 2012.

== SouthFM reunion (2010) ==
During SouthFM's initial six year run, the band accumulated a plethora of unreleased music from b-sides, demos, alternate mixes, and live performances. To bring these songs to their fans, they released a three-disc rarities compilation album, with each section comprising unreleased songs from the three eras of the band's existence: the Drama Kids era, the Swallowing the Pill era, and a third period in which the band were working on an uncompleted third studio album. The triple album was titled Letters That Were Never Sent, and was released in the summer of 2010. To promote the album, the band played a sold-out show at the Curtain Club in Deep Ellum. The reunion concert was so successful that the band played a series of concerts across Texas in late 2010.

== Lambs to Lions and SouthFM full reunion (2011–2014) ==
During SXSW in March 2011 Estrada played a concert with Matt Noveskey and Ryan Holley of the Austin-based band (a+)machines, who had been tour mates with SouthFM. The musicians enjoyed the show so much that afterwards they decided to form a band together. The group, which they named Lambs to Lions, periodically met at Noveskey’s studio in Austin to write and rehearse songs, and soon included Deep Ella drummer Fonz Lovelace. They planned to eventually release an album and play a tour, but the plans were slow moving due to everyone’s involvement in other projects. In early 2014 Noveskey left the group and was replaced by former SouthFM bassist Dave Shafer. Former SouthFM guitarist Chad Abbott was invited to join, and the group soon morphed into a new incarnation of SouthFM. In April 2014 Paco confirmed in a facebook post that SouthFM had reunited, and the songs written with Lambs to Lions would form the basis of a new SouthFM album Day of the Rose.

== SPCCMP (2012–2014) ==
In 2012 Paco began collaborating with rapper Jeremy Rodriguez on a hip hop project called SPCCMP (Space Camp, with the vowels removed). The duo released an EP The Daydreamer's Guide to Wasting Time in 2012. They assembled a backing band and hit the road for the next two years, including a packed showcase at SXSW in 2013. In 2014 they released a second EP Full Moon. SPCCMP has been on hiatus since 2016.

== Solo albums and Bedtime Stories (2011–2016) ==
As One Love was winding down, Paco began working on a solo acoustic album The Definite and the Indefinite… Integrals of Logarithmic and Exponential Functions, which he released in April 2011. After playing SXSW with Ryan Holley and Matt Noveskey in March 2011, Ryan Holley became Estrada's defacto accompanist for the album’s supporting tour dates. During this time Paco landed his first movie soundtrack appearance when his song "I Will Never Let You Go" was included in the 2012 film Love or Whatever which starred Joel Rush, Jennifer Elise Cox, Julie Goldman, and Kate Flannery.

In May 2012, following the death of their singer Chad Gandy, the Dallas-based band The Last Romantica asked Paco to sing one of Gandy’s songs with them at a tribute concert they were organizing. Estrada and the band had an instant connection and began jamming and rehearsing new songs on a regular basis. On September 29, 2012 Paco Estrada, backed by The Last Romantica, played a concert in Dallas and recorded the show for a live album/concert film entitled Bedtime Stories, which he had planned to release in 2013. However during the post-production process for the live album, Paco continued to play his new songs live with Ryan Holley, and the duo were able to further develop the songs beyond their recorded versions. Paco shared demos of the songs with Matt Noveskey who was floored, and begged to be involved with a proper recording of them. In the fall of 2014 the Lambs to Lions lineup reformed to record Bedtime Stories as a studio album. The album represented a further expansion of Estrada’s sound, showcasing a more piano-driven style rooted in Motown rhythm and blues. Several friends from throughout the Texas music scene were brought into the sessions, including Justin Furstenfeld and Johnny Goudie on backing vocals, Casey McPherson of Alpha Rev on piano, Adam Gontier of Three Days Grace on harmonies, Dan Cohen of Waking Fable on horns, and Lauren J. Reed on strings. The album, which also included a DVD of some of the footage from the Last Romantica concert along with videos from the recording studio, was released March 28, 2015.

In early 2016 Paco was hospitalized with a severe infection and was placed in a nearly month-long medically-induced coma. His family, friends, and fans rallied around him, starting a GoFundMe page, and organizing a benefit concert which was headlined by Bowling For Soup. Paco made a full recovery, but took a several months break from touring to rest and recuperate. In September 2016 he staged a comeback tour with supporting acts Ryan Delahoussaye, Deep Ella, and The Wartime Social. The tour coincided with Paco's first album to be released on vinyl, a "best-of" compilation entitled Reckless Love.

== Collaboration with Nothing More (2009–2017) ==
SouthFM had toured with San Antonio-based band Nothing More, and Paco helped Nothing More refine the songs for their 2007 debut album Save You/Save Me. For their 2009 followup album The Few Not Fleeting, Estrada provided guest vocals on the song "Bullets and Blue Eyes". In 2013 Estrada released the solo EP How I Spent My Summer Vacation. For a portion of his 2013 tour cycle, Paco was the opening act on a tour with Nothing More. During his time with Nothing More, he co-wrote five songs which appeared on their 2014 self-titled breakthrough album, three of which were released as singles, including the lead single "This Is the Time (Ballast)". The single reached the #2 spot on the Mainstream Rock Chart and the #1 spot on the Mediabase Active rock chart; and the album reached the #3 spot on the Hard Rock Albums chart. Another one of the singles Paco co-wrote, "Here's to the Heartache" peaked at #4 on the Mainstream Rock Chart

Paco again wrote with the band for their 2017 follow up The Stories We Tell Ourselves, which again was a critical and commercial success, reaching the #2 spot on both the Hard Rock Albums and Independent Albums charts, and was nominated for Best Rock Album, Best Rock Song, and Best Rock Performance at the 60th Annual Grammy Awards. Paco also co-wrote the single "Just Say When" which peaked at #8 on the Mainstream Rock Chart

== Heart of the City (2017–present) ==
In 2017 Paco teamed up with Brandon Callies on a new project called Heart of the City. They signed to Dallas-based label Hand Drawn Records, which released the group’s self-titled debut album in January 2018. Blending Texas blues and Motown soul, the group counts among their influences legendary artists such as James Brown, Bill Withers, Nina Simone, and Funkadelic, as well as contemporary groups Alabama Shakes, St. Paul and the Broken Bones, and Nathaniel Rateliff & the Night Sweats. Since its formation Heart of the City has received critical praise and maintains a rigorous touring schedule. In March 2024 Heart of the City announced they have been writing and recording a new album.

== Other collaborations ==
Paco serves as a resident songwriter at Orb Studios and has written several songs with artists who have recorded at the studio, including Darryl McDaniels of Run-DMC, and the bands Blue October, Cure For Paranoia and Courrier. Estrada wrote the songs "When We Were Made" and "Holding On" on country artist Cody Bryan's 2013 album Wreck Me and also wrote the song "American Girls" on Bryan's 2015 EP Small Town Noise. Paco also co-wrote the singles "Stubborn" and "Beautiful Stranger" on Bryan's 2018 album Here. Paco's song "Whiskey Kisses" was included on The American Revival's 2019 album The Saint, And The Sinner. In 2020 Estrada sang lead vocals on the song "Porcelain" and co-wrote the songs "Aces", "Bones", "Butcher of Baytown", "Vultures" and "Porcelain" on Icarus Bell’s debut album The Great Collapse which was released January 6, 2024. Paco co-wrote Blue October's 2024 single "Everything We Lost in the Fire", which broke into the top 40 on both the iHeartRadio and Billboard Alternative Airplay charts, made the top ten at several radio stations nationwide, and is the title track to the band's forthcoming thirteenth studio album.

== Discography ==
=== As principal artist ===
Solo

- Closure: The Belton Sessions (2007)
- When the Lights Go Down: An Acoustic Collection 2005-2007 (2010)
- The Definite and Indefinite…Integrals of Logarithmic and Exponential Functions (2011)
- How I Spent My Summer Vacation (EP) (2013)
- Bedtime Stories (2015)
- Dancing with the Devil (Live@Orb ATX 10.31.15) (2015)
- Reckless Love (compilation) (2016)

With SouthFM

- SouthFM (EP) (2000)
- Live & Acoustic in Deep Ellum (EP) (2000)
- Drama Kids (2003)
- Swallowing the Pill (2005)
- Letters that Were Never Sent (Triple album) (2010)
- Telegrams from the Dead: Knives//Razors (2025)
- Day of the Rose (forthcoming)

With One Love

- The Anatomy of Letting Go (2009)
- Killing Me: The Beginning of Letting Go (2012)
- Letting Go: The Farewell Show (Live) (2012)

With SPCCMP

- The Daydreamer’s Guide to Wasting Time (EP) (2012)
- Full Moon (EP) (2014)

With Heart of the City

- Heart of the City (2018)
- Boarded Up (Live EP) (2024)

=== As songwriter ===
American Revival

- The Saint, And The Sinner (2019)

Blue October

- Everything We Lost in the Fire (forthcoming)

Cody Bryan

- Wreck Me (2013)
- Small Town Noise (2015)
- Here (2018)

Courrier

- A Violent Flame (2011)

Icarus Bell

- The Great Collapse (2024)

Nothing More

- Nothing More (2014)
- The Stories We Tell Ourselves (2017)

Reed Deming

- Follow Me To Freedom (2018)

=== As Guest Vocalist ===
Nothing More

- The Few Not Fleeting (2009)

Icarus Bell

- The Great Collapse (2024)
