= Angel Song (song) =

2024 song by Nothing More

Single by Nothing More featuring David Draiman

from the album Carnal
- Released: May 17, 2024
- Studio: Los Angeles
- Length: 3:06
- Label: Better Noise Music
- Songwriters: Jonny Hawkins; Mark Vollelunga; Daniel Oliver; Ben Anderson; Drew Fulk; Zach Jones
- Producer: Fulk

Nothing More singles chronology
"House on Sand" (2024)	"Angel Song" (2024)	"Freefall" (2025)

"Angel Song (EP)" artwork

Music video
- "Angel Song" on YouTube

"Angel Song" is a song by American rock band Nothing More featuring David Draiman, lead vocalist of American heavy metal band Disturbed. It is the third single and fourth track from Nothing More's seventh album, Carnal. It reached No. 1 on the Billboard Mainstream Rock Airplay chart in November 2024.

== Release ==
The single was released for streaming on May 17, 2024, alongside an official music video. A new version of the track was rearranged and remixed by Justin "JD" deBlieck. It was released alongside the announcement of the 10th Anniversary Edition of Nothing More's self-titled debut album, which was scheduled for November 22, 2024.

== Background and recording ==
According to bassist Daniel Oliver, the song was written during a day off from studio production while the band was in Los Angeles, working with songwriter Zach Jones. He stated that the song's main rhythm and vocal melody emerged quickly during the session. Oliver also noted that the band had recently reconnected with Disturbed while playing festivals in Europe and sought a guest vocalist with a powerful, distinctive voice for the track. David Draiman was chosen, with Oliver noting that the band felt the song required an "epic, larger than life" voice, making Draiman an obvious choice.

Vocalist Jonny Hawkins said the band felt "Angel Song" would be a bigger radio song and noted that it was more rock-leaning than metal, adding that Draiman was "the rock radio darling" in the United States. Hawkins stated that the song addresses the tension between humanity's past and future selves. He also said that as the song took shape in the studio, it became clear that Draiman's vocal style would complement the track. Draiman described the track as powerful and said that he had been a fan of Nothing More since the band's early years.

In an October 2024 interview, Hawkins noted that Draiman performs the song's second verse and said the song's lyrics, especially the second verse, are anti-authoritarian in tone. He described collaborating with Draiman as a "full circle" moment, recalling that he first heard Disturbed while in middle school. At the time of the interview, Nothing More was preparing to tour with Disturbed for the 25th anniversary of The Sickness.

== Composition ==
Oliver described the song as being driven by a heavy four-on-the-floor beat, with a groove-focused rhythm forming the basis of the song's structure. He stated that the introduction and verse rhythm were developed early in the writing process. He compared the track to the band's attempt at creating a song with a similar impact to Led Zeppelin's "Immigrant Song".

According to Metal Hammer, the song features a stomping groove and a chorus highlighting collective unity, while Kerrang! said it features crunchy guitar riffs.

== Reception ==
Blabbermouth.net described the song as a standout track on Carnal, saying that Draiman's powerful voice radiates throughout the track. The review also noted that the song's rhythmic feel is reminiscent of "Down with the Sickness", though less heavy.

== Music video ==
The video was directed by Orie McGinness, who has worked with artists such as Bad Omens and ERRA. It depicts a woman in period clothing performing chores and seeing a robot on fire, as well as scenes of robots falling from the sky.

A live version was recorded during Nothing More's performance at the Aftershock Festival 2024. The recording was released as an official video and is included as a bonus track on the deluxe edition of Carnal, alongside the original track and a remix by Justin "JD" deBlieck.

== Track listing ==
All tracks are written by Nothing More (Jonny Hawkins, Mark Vollelunga, Daniel Oliver, Ben Anderson), including additional as noted.

Angel Song EP
No.	Title	Writer(s)	Length
1.	"Angel Song (featuring David Draiman) [JD remix]" (explicit)	Drew Fulk; Zach Jones	3:46
2.	"Angel Song (featuring David Draiman)" (explicit)	Fulk; Jones	3:06
3.	"Down the River" (explicit)	Doug Showalter	3:06
4.	"Existential Dread" (explicit)	Andrew Baylis; Michael Whitworth; Fulk	4:04
Total length:			14:02

Notes

- All track titles are stylized in all uppercase.

== Chart performance ==
It reached No. 1 on the Billboard Mainstream Rock Airplay chart on November 23, 2024, their third song to do so.

== Personnel ==
Credits adapted from Apple Music.

Nothing More

- Jonny Hawkins – lead vocals, songwriter, programming
- Daniel Oliver – bass, songwriter
- Mark Vollelunga – guitar, songwriter
- Ben Anderson – drums, songwriter, programming

Additional credits

- David Draiman – guest vocals
- Wzrd Bld – songwriter, producer
- Zach Jones – songwriter, assistant producer

== Charts ==
=== Weekly charts ===
Weekly chart performance for "Angel Song"
Chart (2024–2025)	Peak position
Canada Mainstream Rock (Billboard)	29
Czech Republic Modern Rock (ČNS IFPI)	3
US Rock & Alternative Airplay (Billboard)	10
US Mainstream Rock Airplay (Billboard)	1

=== Year-end charts ===
Year-end chart performance for "Angel Song"
Chart (2025)	Position
Canada Mainstream Rock (Billboard)	76
US Mainstream Rock Airplay (Billboard)	39
