= Tired of Winning (song) =

Single by Nothing More

from the album Spirits
- Released: April 28, 2022
- Genre: Alternative rock
- Length: 3:26
- Label: Better Noise

Nothing More singles chronology
"Just Say When" (2018)	"Tired of Winning" (2022)	"You Don't Know What Love Means" (2022)

Music video
- "Tired of Winning / Ships in the Night" on YouTube

"Tired of Winning" is a song by American rock band Nothing More. It was their first single off of their sixth studio album Spirits. It peaked at number 5 on the Billboard Mainstream Rock Songs chart in 2022.

== Background ==
"Tired of Winning" was released as the first official single from the band's fifth studio album, Spirits on April 28, 2022. A music video was released at the same time. The song was the second to be released ahead of Spirits' October 2022 release date, following promo song "Turn It Up Like (Stand in the Fire)" a month prior. By July 2022, the song had hit the top 10 of the Billboard Mainstream Rock Songs chart, eventually peaking shortly after at number 5. An extended version of the single, containing another track from the album, "Ships in the Night", was released at the same time. The extended version was also featured on the soundtrack to the film The Retaliators, which was released in September 2022.

== Themes and composition ==
Loudwire described the song as "thought-provoking" and a "heavy track with some equally intense lyrical content". Frontman Jonny Hawkins described the song as being about self-sabotage and humanity's inclination to never be happy or content with what they have, and it leading to them feeling miserable as a result. He elaborated:

"We find ourselves in the same position humanity has found itself over and over again... at the end of a series of self made problems. When we wake up to this, we realize that we are our own worst enemy, yet we focus so much of our energy on externalizing our problems. This song is a bird's eye view of human nature...I think we all tend to lose the meaning in life by hyper focusing on it and romanticizing it. It's a paradox... It's like trying to grasp water in your hand; the tighter you hold, the less you have. The more weight you put on the "meaning" of your life, the less you feel connected to it. The purpose of life might be as simple as life itself... nothing more, nothing less."

Hawkins described the band's intent with creating the song's sound as if "aliens had a baby with a 90's rock band" and that the accompanying music video was "that baby grew up, dropped out of college and made [the] music video". The extended single version of the song contains a spoken word segment by philosopher Alan Watts, who had spoken word sound samples on numerous tracks off the band's 2013 eponymous album and their 2017 album The Stories We Tell Ourselves.

== Personnel ==
Band

- Jonny Hawkins – lead vocals
- Mark Vollelunga – guitar
- Daniel Oliver – bass, keyboards
- Ben Anderson – drums

== Charts ==
Chart (2022)	Peak position
US Mainstream Rock (Billboard)	5
