= Freefall (Nothing More song) =

2025 song by Nothing More

Single by Nothing More featuring Chris Daughtry

from the album Carnal (deluxe)
- Released: March 31, 2025
- Length: 3:46
- Label: Better Noise Music
- Songwriters: Jonny Hawkins; Mark Vollelunga; Daniel Oliver; Ben Anderson; Drew Fulk
- Producer: Fulk

Nothing More singles chronology
"Angel Song" (2024)	"Freefall" (2025)

Music video
- "Freefall" (official) on YouTube "Freefall" (performance) on YouTube

"Freefall" is a song by American rock band Nothing More featuring Chris Daughtry of his eponymous band. It is the fourth single and bonus track from Nothing More's digital deluxe version of their seventh album, Carnal. It reached No. 1 on the Billboard Mainstream Rock Airplay chart in August 2025.

== Background and recording ==
The original version of "Freefall" appears as the fifth track on Carnal. The band later revisited the song, recording a revised version featuring guest vocals from Chris Daughtry for the album's deluxe edition. This version was shared online on March 28, 2025, accompanied by an official music video. The official single was released on March 31, 2025.

== Composition and lyrics ==
Guitarist Mark Vollelunga said the song was intended to let listeners know they are not alone when everything feels like it is collapsing around them. Singer Jonny Hawkins said the song is about times of uncertainty and personal loss. He said it suggests that such experiences can lead to personal or spiritual transformation and said it describes moments when it feels as though the ground has dropped beneath a person.

== Music video ==
The music video was directed by Stephen Wayne Mallet. It shows a firefighter dealing with mental health challenges who finds renewed purpose after meeting a homeless dog. It was filmed in Clifton, Tennessee, and includes local first responders and actor Michael Lombardi. The video features the band's collaboration with K9s for Warriors, an organization that provides service dogs to veterans and first responders.

== Charity and activism ==
In conjunction with the release, the band partnered with K9s For Warriors. Vollelunga said the band partnered with K9s For Warriors to raise awareness of PTSD and mental health trauma and spoke about the positive impact of service animals. Hawkins said the song's themes made it a natural fit for the partnership and said he was pleased that Daughtry joined the track.

== Track listing ==
FREEFALL (feat. Chris Daughtry) - by Nothing More Single
No.	Title	Length
1.	"Freefall (feat. Chris Daughtry)"	3:46

Notes

- Stylized in all uppercase.

== Commercial performance ==
It reached No. 1 on the Billboard Mainstream Rock Airplay chart on August 9, 2025, their fifth song to do so. For Daughtry, it was his first No. 1 on the Mainstream Rock Airplay chart as a solo artist and his third overall. It also reached number one on the Mediabase Active Rock chart, becoming Nothing More's fourth consecutive No. 1 single from Carnal. With this achievement, the band joined a select group of artists who have achieved four No. 1 singles from a single album.

== Personnel ==
Credits adapted from Apple Music.

Nothing More

- Jonny Hawkins – lead vocals, songwriter
- Daniel Oliver – bass, songwriter
- Mark Vollelunga – guitar, songwriter
- Ben Anderson – drums, songwriter

Additional credits

- Chris Daughtry – guest vocals
- Wzrd Bld – songwriter, producer, mixing engineer

== Charts ==
=== Weekly charts ===
Weekly chart performance for "Freefall"
Chart (2025)	Peak position
Canada Mainstream Rock (Billboard Canada)	29
US Rock & Alternative Airplay (Billboard)	16
US Mainstream Rock Airplay (Billboard)	1

=== Year-end charts ===
Year-end chart performance for "Freefall"
Chart (2025)	Position
US Mainstream Rock Airplay (Billboard)	29
