= Just Say When =

Single by Nothing More

from the album The Stories We Tell Ourselves
- Released: April 27, 2018
- Recorded: 2016–2017
- Genre: Soft rock
- Length: 3:42
- Label: Eleven Seven
- Songwriters: Nothing More; Will Hoffman; Paco Estrada
- Producers: Nothing More; Will Hoffman

Nothing More singles chronology
"Do You Really Want It?" (2017)	"Just Say When" (2018)	"Tired of Winning" (2022)

Music video
- "Just Say When" on YouTube

"Just Say When" is a song by American rock band Nothing More. It was their third single off of their album The Stories We Tell Ourselves. It peaked at number 8 on the Billboard Mainstream Rock Songs chart in September 2018.

== Background ==
In December 2017, after Nothing More earned three Grammy Award nominations, one for the album The Stories We Tell Ourselves (Best Rock Album), and two for its first single, "Go to War" (Best Rock Performance and Best Rock Song), the president of the band's record label, Eleven Seven Music, announced plans to release the track "Just Say When" as a single. This was due to the belief that the softer sound of "Just Say When" was most likely out of the album to appeal outside of the band's core hard rock fanbase and into the alternative rock, indie rock, and pop music radio stations and markets, in an effort to maximize the band's exposure from the Grammy Nominations. While the band would ultimately release the hard rock "Do You Really Want It?" as the album's second single, the band later released "Just Say When" as the third single. The song, alongside an accompanying music video, was released on April 27, 2018. The video was directed by Daniel Cummings and recorded at El Paso International Airport. The video involves a man chasing after a woman, catching up to her, slow dancing with her, only to have one fall to their knees while the other ends up running away. A lyric video had also previously been released in August 2017, as a promotional effort prior to the album's release.

== Themes and composition ==
Frontman and lyricist Jonny Hawkins described the song as being about his emotionally difficult divorce.

"The day my mom died I met a girl. This girl became my girlfriend and years later my wife. With fear of the past and hope for the future, we set sail with holes in our boat. As the inevitable pressures of life came pouring in, we sensed ourselves starting to sink. Two half-souls shoveling buckets of water, desperate to hold on to an imagined future, but not fast enough. Then one day she became my ex-wife. I felt in my gut that it was right, but every other part felt wrong. Whether people will admit it or not, I think our deepest fear is the loss of love. I found something to be more afraid of... settling... lukewarm... Just Say When."

Musically, the song was described as an outlier for the band and album; while much of their music has a heavier, hard rock sound, the song was described as an acoustic ballad, consisting of just vocals, acoustic guitar, and strings, and having a pop-punk ballad influence.

== Personnel ==
Band

- Jonny Hawkins – lead vocals
- Mark Vollelunga – guitar, backing vocals
- Daniel Oliver – bass, keyboards, backing vocals
- Ben Anderson – drums

Addition musicians and production

- Ryan Delahoussaye – strings
- Tony Rodgers – cello
- Will Hoffman – production

== Charts ==
Chart (2018)	Peak position
US Mainstream Rock (Billboard)	8
