= House on Sand =

2024 song by Nothing More

Single by Nothing More featuring Eric Vanlerberghe

from the album Carnal
- Released: April 12, 2024
- Length: 4:23
- Label: Better Noise Music
- Songwriters: Jonny Hawkins; Daniel Oliver; Mark Vollelunga; Ben Anderson; Drew Fulk; Cody Quistad
- Producer: Fulk

Nothing More singles chronology
"If It Doesn't Hurt" (2024)	"House on Sand" (2024)	"Angel Song" (2024)

Music video
- "House on Sand" on YouTube

"House on Sand" is a song by American rock band Nothing More featuring Eric Vanlerberghe, lead vocalist of American rock band I Prevail. It is the second single and second track from Nothing More's seventh album, Carnal. It reached No. 1 on the Billboard Mainstream Rock Airplay chart in May 2025.

== Background and release ==
The song was released as a single on April 12, 2024. The track features guest vocals from I Prevail vocalist Eric Vanlerberghe, who became involved after the bands developed a friendship during a European festival tour. Vanlerberghe was approached after the band toured with Disturbed and I Prevail in Switzerland, following a chance to socialize with him in the green room. According to Vanlerberghe, Nothing More sent him a demo nearly a year before the single's release, and he found that the song resonated strongly with him. A music video for the song premiered online on April 15, 2024.

== Composition and lyrics ==
Bassist Daniel Oliver said the song originally felt unbalanced due to a melodic chorus paired with heavy riffs, but the contrast was addressed by making the surrounding instrumentation heavier. He said the lyrics deal with forgiveness and starting anew, using an old Bible metaphor in the chorus.

Hawkins described the song as leaning more toward rock than metal and said he believed the song would perform well on U.S. rock radio. He explained that the song deals with feeling torn between following one's inner voice or pursuing a different path. It was written while Hawkins was uprooting his life and rebuilding, a theme touched on throughout the album. He also said the song addresses losing sight of one's purpose in life and is about the choice between continuing to play it safe or turning back to start again.

In a review of Carnal, Metal Hammer described the track as a heavy, larger-than-life howl of renewed vigour after hardship. Distorted Sound said the track is fun and invigoratingly intense. Kerrang! described the song as having a sound that is reminiscent of a discarded track by Fever 333. In a review of Carnal, Blabbermouth.net described the song as one of the heaviest tracks on the album. The review noted the pair's sharp screaming and manic delivery. The reviewer also noted that, despite being less radio-friendly, the song adds variety and an added dose of aggression to the album.

== Track listing ==
All tracks are written by Nothing More (Jonny Hawkins, Mark Vollelunga, Daniel Oliver, Ben Anderson), including additional where noted.

HOUSE ON SAND (feat. Eric V. of I Prevail) / Nothing More Single
No.	Title	Writer(s)	Length
1.	"House on Sand (feat. Eric V. of I Prevail)" (Explicit)	Cody Quistad; Drew Fulk	4:23
2.	"If It Doesn't Hurt"	Fulk; Will Hoffman; Zakk Cervini	2:59
Total length:			7:22

Notes

- All track titles are stylized in all uppercase.

== Chart performance ==
It reached No. 1 on the Billboard Mainstream Rock Airplay chart on May 3, 2025, their fourth song to do so. It's also Vanlerberghe's first No. 1 as a featured artist. The song is their third single from Carnal to reach No. 1 on this chart and Mediabase Active Rock charts.

== Personnel ==
Credits adapted from Apple Music.

Nothing More

- Jonny Hawkins – lead vocals, programming, songwriter
- Daniel Oliver – bass, songwriter
- Mark Vollelunga – guitar, songwriter
- Ben Anderson – drums, programming, songwriter

Additional credits

- Eric Vanlerberghe – guest vocals
- Wzrd Bld – songwriter, producer
- Cody Quistad – songwriter, assistant producer

== Charts ==
=== Weekly charts ===
Weekly chart performance for "House on Sand"
Chart (2025)	Peak position
US Rock & Alternative Airplay (Billboard)	13
US Mainstream Rock Airplay (Billboard)	1

=== Year-end charts ===
Year-end chart performance for "House on Sand"
Chart (2025)	Position
US Mainstream Rock Airplay (Billboard)	18
