= Live album (disambiguation) =

A live album is a type of album that was recorded at a concert before an audience.

Live album may also refer to:

- Live Album (Grand Funk Railroad album), 1970
- Live Album, an album by Country Teasers, 2005
- The Live Album, an album by Robert Earl Keen, 1988
- The Live Album, an album by Leon Russell and New Grass Revival, 1981

== See also ==
- List of albums titled Live
- Live discography, recordings by the American rock band Live
