= SouthFM =

American rock band

Background information
- Origin: Dallas, Texas, U.S.
- Genres: Alternative rock; alternative metal; progressive rock; hard rock; art rock
- Years active: 2000–2006; 2010–present
- Labels: MCA; Brando
- Members: Paco Estrada; Chad Abbott; James David Shafer; Cody Sowell; Andrew Pederson
- Past members: G.I. Sanders; Moe Martinez; Doug McGrath; Spencer Estep; Scot Risch; Tabber Millard
- Website: southfm.bandcamp.com

SouthFM is an American alternative rock band based in Dallas, Texas. They formed in 2000 and disbanded in October 2006. The band officially released two full-length albums, Drama Kids (2003) and Swallowing the Pill (2005). The band reunited for one concert in June 2010, and played more shows in November 2010. As of 2016, they have reformed and are working on a new album.

== History ==
=== Drama Kids (2001–2004) ===
SouthFM's first album Drama Kids was originally released by Dallas-based indie label Brando Records, and later re-released nationally by MCA. The lead single, "Dear Claudia", received good airplay in the U.S. and was included in an episode of Law & Order SVU. Ken Shimamoto of the Fort Worth Weekly said Paco Estrada's "pipes are strong and expressive enough to set him apart from the other 10,000 faceless, droning alt-rock angst-boys." In 2003 SouthFM toured nationwide with Brando label-mates Blue October. MCA closed its doors while SouthFM was touring in support of Drama Kids, leaving the band and album behind. Many MCA artists were merged into Geffen Records, SouthFM however, was released from their contract.

=== Swallowing the Pill and breakup (2005–2006) ===
After nearly two years of writing since parting ways with MCA/Geffen the band released their follow up album, Swallowing The Pill, yet again on Brando Records. Two singles were officially released to radio, "Killing Me" and "Blue & Grey". The band toured regionally throughout 2005 and 2006, until their final show on October 28, 2006, at the Curtain Club in Dallas, Texas.

=== Reformation and Letters That Were Never Sent (2007–2011) ===
On June 12, 2010, SouthFM reunited to play one concert. The sold-out show featured the band playing songs from all eras of SouthFM, including the band's original lineup forming on stage to play songs for Drama Kids. The concert promoted the release of the SouthFM's release of a triple album of unreleased songs entitled Letters That Were Never Sent. The reunion was so successful that the band made plans to play more shows.

Letters That Were Never Sent is a three-part digital compilation album of demos, live, and rare recordings by SouthFM. The majority of the songs were written/recorded leading up to the releases of Drama Kids and Swallowing The Pill prior to 2005. Some of these songs ended up being re-recorded professionally for the actual albums while others were never released.

SouthFM gathered again in November 2010 to play three shows. This time they were not joined by original guitarist, G.I. Sanders. Dan Rivera, a friend of the band, filled in on guitar. They were scheduled to play in three Texas cities, Dallas, Tyler, and San Antonio, which was cancelled due to an illness. November 20, 2010, at The Venue @ The Down Under Pub in Tyler, Texas, and the following weekend on November 27, 2010, at Trees in Dallas, Texas. Opening for SouthFM that night was Mothers Anthem, Eyes Burn Electric and Meridian.

=== The Day of the Rose (2012–present) ===
During SXSW 2011, Paco Estrada played a show with Ryan Holley and Matt Noveskey of A+ Machines. A+ Machines used to play shows with SouthFM, and Ryan Holley had provided vocals on SouthFM's song "Regret / The Grieving" on the Swallowing the Pill album. The musicians enjoyed the show so much that they decided to form a new band together, along with drummer Alphonso Lovelace and keys player Deuce Wanier (although he would not go on to join the reincarnation of SouthFM). The new band was called Lambs to Lions, and their sound was very similar to SouthFM. The group would periodically meet at Noveskey's recording studio in Austin to write and rehearse new songs. All of the members were involved in other musical projects, and over time it became clear that Noveskey would not have time to devote to the band. The group recruited SouthFM's bassist Dave Shafer and guitarist Chad Abbott, and decided to transform Lambs to Lions into a new incarnation of SouthFM. They are currently writing their next album, The Day Of The Rose.

== Band members ==
Founding members Paco Estrada (vocals), G.I. Sanders (guitar), and Chad Abbott (guitar), were the mainstays for the band, performing on every recording and at every show during the band's existence. Dave Shafer (bass) and Tabber Millard (drums) were also members of the band at the end. Other members included Moe Martinez (drums), Doug McGrath (bass), Spencer Estep (drums), and Scot Risch (bass).

When the band decided to reform, G.I. Sanders was not able to participate, and the lead guitar post was taken by Ryan Holley, who had been a frequent collaborator and tourmate of SouthFM. The drumming spot was filled by Fonz Lovelace. Holley and Lovelace had also been members of Paco Estrada's band Lamb's to Lions. The lead guitar and drummer spots were eventually occupied by Cody Sowell and Andrew Pederson, respectively.

== Discography ==
- Drama Kids (2003)
- Swallowing the Pill (2005)
- Letters that Were Never Sent (triple album) (2010)
- Telegrams from the Dead: Knives//Razors (2025)
- Day of the Rose (forthcoming)
