= Mr. MTV =

Single by Nothing More

from the album Nothing More
- Released: December 1, 2014
- Genre: Alternative metal
- Length: 3:59
- Label: Eleven Seven
- Songwriters: Jonny Hawkins, Daniel Oliver, Will Hoffman, Mark Vollelunga, Mark Knopfler, Sting

Nothing More singles chronology
"This Is the Time (Ballast)" (2014)	"Mr. MTV" (2014)	"Jenny" (2015)

"Mr. MTV" is a song from American rock band Nothing More. Released on 1 December 2014, it is the second single from Nothing More, the fourth studio album from the band. The song discusses the opposition of the ensemble to consumerism, passive viewing of television programs, and the organizations behind it. The intro uses a reworked sample of the 1985 Dire Straits single "Money for Nothing".

== Music and theme ==
The song uses MTV to demonstrate the larger issue of the direction that people or organizations take in their lives when cash or rankings are valued more highly than actions. Bassist Daniel Oliver went on to state that some people who make money have the sole objective of changing the minds and behaviors of people for what they choose, and that there is a downside to that, especially when the self-image of children is based on television instead of family. Oliver continues by saying that some relationships are no longer based on a personal connection between the two individuals, as men and women nowadays are sold a personal connection within themselves and anything else for something they watch on television.

The intro uses a reworked sample of the radio edit intro for the 1985 Dire Straits single "Money for Nothing", which is sung by featured artist Sting, and follows the melody of the 1980 The Police single "Don't Stand So Close to Me".

Jonny Hawkins played the drums on the verses, while the drums in the chorus were played by then-drummer Paul O'Brien.

== Chart positions ==
Chart	Peak positions
US Mainstream Rock (Billboard)	12
US Rock Airplay	42
