= Carnal (album) =

Studio album by Nothing More
- Released: June 28, 2024
- Genres: Alternative metal; alternative rock; hard rock; indie rock; pop rock; post-grunge
- Length: 45:58
- Label: Better Noise

Nothing More chronology
Spirits (2022)	Carnal (2024)

Singles from Carnal
- 1. "If It Doesn't Hurt" Released: January 19, 2024; 2. "House on Sand" Released: April 12, 2024; 3. "Angel Song" Released: May 17, 2024; 4. "Freefall" Released: March 31, 2025

Carnal is the seventh studio album by the American rock band Nothing More, released on June 28, 2024.

== Style, writing, and composition ==
Carnal is primarily a modern rock and alternative metal album, with several songs having more pop influences. The album contains ten full-length songs with five shorter interludes featuring samples of speeches by philosopher Alan Watts. Similar to the band's previous releases, Carnal deals with themes of fear, hardship, and persistence.

"House on Sand", featuring Eric Vanlerberghe of I Prevail, is heavier than the other songs on the album and is characterized by "sharp screaming and manic delivery". Thematically, it is about the choice between continuing along a safe but unfulfilling path or returning to pursue one's original direction. Though it takes a "pop-oriented approach", the lead single "If It Doesn't Hurt" is nevertheless a "heavy and hard-hitting" rock song about a toxic relationship. Disturbed frontman David Draiman is featured on "Angel Song", a song built on a heavy four-on-the-floor beat and noted for a rhythmic feel comparable to Disturbed's "Down with the Sickness". The band wrote "Freefall" when their producer, Drew, suggested they write a song "reminiscent of the Foo Fighters". The song is emotionally vulnerable and contributes to the album’s theme of persistence. Similar to "If It Doesn’t Hurt", "Blame It On The Drugs" is influenced by pop while still retaining rock elements. Addressing the negative effects of social media and the internet, "Existential Dread" conveys anxiety in its verses through "tortured vocals" contrasting with a "triumphant" chorus. An experimental interlude, "Heart" has "ethereal instrumentals" interspersed with samples of Watts. The first song to be written for the album was "Down The River", a piece of anthemic, acoustic-driven rock about "living in harmony with the world". "Give It Time" is a relatively softer song incorporating elements from other genres and lyrically about accepting pain. The screamed verses of rapper Sinizter distinguish "Stuck" from the typical alternative metal of many of the album's songs. "Run For Your Life" strikes "ominous tones" with a "mainstream-sounding, anthemic feel" reminiscent of Alter Bridge and Sevendust as it demonstrates the importance of persistence. The final song, "Sound", has an electronic beat and again features spoken word from Watts. Emily Swingle of Metal Hammer viewed the song's "tech-y distortion" as one of the album's few breaks from traditional alternative metal.

== Reception ==
Professional ratings
Review scores
Source	Rating
AllMusic	3/5 stars
Blabbermouth	8/10
Distorted Sound Mag	9/10
Kerrang!	3/5
Metal Hammer	3/5 stars

Reviews of the album was mixed. Critics disagreed on how experimental the album was. Blabbermouth's Anne Erickson found the album to be "eclectic" in its variety of styles, in keeping with the band’s tendency to experiment. In contrast, Emily Swingle, writing for Metal Hammer, said that the album had less experimentation than previous albums and was "not a huge leap forward" for the band.

== Track list ==
Carnal track listing
No.	Title	Length
1.	"Carnal"	1:17
2.	"House on Sand" (featuring Eric Vanlerberghe of I Prevail)	4:24
3.	"If It Doesn't Hurt"	3:00
4.	"Angel Song" (featuring David Draiman)	3:07
5.	"Freefall"	3:47
6.	"Blame It On the Drugs"	3:21
7.	"Head"	1:10
8.	"Existential Dread"	4:05
9.	"Heart"	3:46
10.	"Down the River"	3:07
11.	"Give It Time"	3:40
12.	"Sight"	1:11
13.	"Stuck" (featuring Sinizter)	3:30
14.	"Run For Your Life"	4:53
15.	"Sound"	1:49

Digital deluxe bonus tracks
No.	Title	Length
16.	"We're All Gonna Die"	3:05
17.	"Freefall" (featuring Chris Daughtry)	3:57
18.	"Angel Song" (Live @ Aftershock featuring David Draiman)	3:26
19.	"House on Sand" (MG Remix featuring Eric Vanlerberghe)	3:02
20.	"Angel Song" (JD Remix featuring David Draiman)	3:47

Notes

- All track titles are stylized in all uppercase.
