= Here's to the Heartache =

Single by Nothing More

from the album Nothing More
- Released: October 13, 2015
- Recorded: 2012–2013
- Genre: Hard rock
- Length: 4:17
- Label: Eleven Seven Music
- Songwriters: Paco Estrada; Will Hoffman; Nothing More; Scott Stevens
- Producers: Will Hoffman; Nothing More

Nothing More singles chronology
"Jenny" (2015)	"Here's to the Heartache" (2015)	"Go to War" (2017)

Music video
- "Here's to the Heartache" on YouTube

"Here's to the Heartache" is a song by American rock band Nothing More. It was their fourth single off their album Nothing More. It peaked at number 4 on the Billboard Mainstream Rock Songs chart in February 2016.

== Background ==
The song was first released as a single on October 13, 2015. A music video was released a month later. The video was directed by Josh Sobel, with help from cinematographer Alex Bergman, who the band had previously worked with on the prior single "Jenny". It features black and white footage of the band performing the song, intermixed with footage of a female figure, representing situations covered in the song's lyrics.

== Themes and composition ==
Lyrically, the song is about celebrating the hardships the band had experienced up to the point of recording their self-titled album. The song is about the concept of coming out stronger after enduring personal struggles such as ended romantic relationships. Lead singer, Jonny Hawkins stated that the lyrics were inspired by the Steve Maraboli quote "As I look back on my life, I realize that every time I thought I was being rejected from something good, I was actually being re-directed to something better." He also explained that it was inspired more directly by the band members' past experiences as well:

"That one started being written in from an interesting place. Our bass player Daniel [Oliver], he had a girlfriend throughout high school and college. Kind of like a high school sweetheart. They had been together for many years. That whole relationship kind of ending up kind of coming to a halt. It was at the time where I was talking about 'I’ll Be OK' [song about Hawkins heartbreak]. A lot of us went through heartbreaks. There was a time period where he didn’t know what was going on with her anymore. They kind of parted ways. He had these dreams about her where there were all these details. Where later on they were actually true. It was like where she was living, and what she was doing. All the dream details made it eerie. So we started talking about this whole experience where he brought it up. We started writing songs from that starting point. It really involved in this kind of nostalgia. It is about looking back at where you came from. At one time, what you thought would be the end of the world; you look back and see the fruit that it bears in life. And you keep moving forward like I was talking about earlier. Now the band can see how many great new things are happening. You have to go through a lot of dark times to get through the other side of the tunnel."

Loudwire described the song as a "chugging rocker".

== Personnel ==
- Credits from album inlay booklet.

Band

- Jonny Hawkins – lead vocals
- Mark Vollelunga – guitar, backing vocals
- Daniel Oliver – bass, keyboards, backing vocals
- Paul O'Brien – drums

Production

- Will Hoffman - production

== Charts ==
Chart (2017)	Peak position
US Mainstream Rock (Billboard)	4
