= If It Doesn't Hurt =

2024 song by Nothing More

Single by Nothing More

from the album Carnal
- Released: January 19, 2024
- Studio: Burbank, California
- Length: 2:59
- Label: Better Noise Music
- Songwriters: Jonny Hawkins; Daniel Oliver; Mark Vollelunga; Ben Anderson; Zakk Cervini; Drew Fulk
- Composer: Will Hoffman
- Producers: Fulk; Cervini

Nothing More singles chronology
"You Don't Know What Love Means" (2022)	"If It Doesn't Hurt" (2024)	"House on Sand" (2024)

Music video
- "If It Doesn't Hurt" on YouTube

"If It Doesn't Hurt" is a song by American rock band Nothing More. It is the lead single and third track from their seventh album, Carnal. It reached No. 1 on the Billboard Mainstream Rock Airplay chart in June 2024.

== Recording and release ==
The song was the first demo recorded with producer Drew Fulk for Carnal, serving as a test of the band's working chemistry. The track was later released as the album's lead single and became the band's first number-one song at radio. Vocalist Jonny Hawkins recorded his vocals for the song using a $20,000 microphone previously used by artists including Will Smith and possibly Beyoncé. He described it as having a certain "magic juju".

The song was released digitally on January 19, 2024. The music video was directed by Orie McGinness, who has worked with Bad Omens and Spiritbox. The band teamed with McGinness to emphasize the song's impassioned lyrical content and potent music through the accompanying music video.

== Background ==
Hawkins said the song is about "gaslighting, manipulation, narcissistic deceit and betrayal". It was written while he was "trapped" and is now sung "while free". He described it as a message for people in toxic relationships. In a 2024 interview, Hawkins said that circumstances surrounding a late-2021 domestic incident involving his former partner inspired the band's song. He said that public reports and reaction to the incident affected both him and others associated with the band.

== Composition and lyrics ==
The track was described as heavy and hard-hitting. Distorted Sound said it blends soulful and sinister elements, mixing melodic and unclean vocals to artistically demonstrate the most ambiguous and confusing of emotions. In a review of Carnal, Blabbermouth.net described the song as taking a more pop-oriented approach while retaining rock elements. It noted the heavy guitars, driving beats, and singable melodies that contribute to a radio-friendly sound.

== Reception ==
Distorted Sound described the song as a quick fan favourite among the band's fans and noted that it became a favourite after its featured use during WWE's WrestleMania XL. AllMusic called it a "fist-pumping" single.

== Media coverage ==
The song was featured on the segment of Loudwire Nights "Chuck's Fight Club" in March 2024, where it was discussed alongside The Plot in You's "Closure". Listeners were invited to vote on which song would be played later that week.

WWE used the song in two video packages for the Women's World Championship match at Wrestlemania XL.

== Track listing ==
If It Doesn't Hurt - by Nothing More Single
No.	Title	Length
1.	"If It Doesn't Hurt"	2:59

Notes

- Stylized in all caps.

== Commercial performance ==
It reached No. 1 on the Billboard Mainstream Rock Airplay chart on June 29, 2024, their second song to do so.

During WrestleMania XL in April 2024, the song saw increased streaming activity. According to Billboard Canada, it accumulated over 580,000 U.S. on-demand streams during that week.

== Personnel ==
Credits adapted from Apple Music.

Nothing More

- Jonny Hawkins - vocals, songwriter, programming
- Daniel Oliver - bass, songwriter
- Mark Vollelunga - guitar, songwriter
- Ben Anderson - drums, songwriter, programming

Additional credits

- Zakk Cervini - songwriter, producer, mixing engineer, mastering engineer
- Wzrd Bld - songwriter, producer
- Will Hoffman - composer

== Charts ==
=== Weekly charts ===
Weekly chart performance for "If It Doesn't Hurt"
Chart (2024–2025)	Peak position
Canada Mainstream Rock (Billboard)	9
US Rock & Alternative Airplay (Billboard)	7
US Mainstream Rock Airplay (Billboard)	1

=== Year-end charts ===
Year-end chart performance for "If It Doesn't Hurt"
Chart (2024)	Position
US Rock & Alternative Airplay (Billboard)	45
US Mainstream Rock Airplay (Billboard)	1

Chart (2025)	Position
Canada Mainstream Rock (Billboard)	37
