= Spirits (Nothing More album) =

Studio album by Nothing More
- Released: October 14, 2022
- Recorded: 2019–2022
- Genre: Alternative metal; alternative rock
- Length: 53:21
- Label: Better Noise
- Producer: Nothing More

Nothing More chronology
The Stories We Tell Ourselves (2017)	Spirits (2022)	Carnal (2024)

Singles from Spirits
- 1. "Tired of Winning" Released: April 28, 2022; 2. "You Don't Know What Love Means" Released: August 13, 2022

Spirits is the sixth studio album by American rock band Nothing More, released on October 14, 2022.

== Background and recording ==
After the release of their fifth studio album, The Stories We Tell Ourselves (2017), Nothing More toured extensively in support of the album. Planning for a follow-up album started as early as January 2019, with frontman Jonny Hawkins stating that he was working on prepping a new studio to prepare for new album sessions between legs of touring. Hawkins noted that focusing on touring was difficult at times when he had so many thoughts on creating a new album. By October, guitarist Mark Vollelunga noted that the band had been creating makeshift recording areas in locker rooms and dressing rooms so they could hold impromptu jam sessions of new material prior to performing their lives shows. He noted that the band would change gears and focus 100% on writing and recording a new album in 2020.

Serious work on the album began in 2020, right about the same time that the COVID-19 pandemic broke out. At first, the band appreciated the forced break in touring to focus on the album, but over time, band members felt it drew out the process unnecessarily; without hard time frames to work with, recording sessions dragged on longer and the band struggled to complete the album. Having to record the album remotely due to COVID-19 restrictions also slowed down the process—by almost a year according to Hawkins. In recording prior albums, the band had only worked remotely to a minimal degree, usually just sending each other song ideas and keeping progress moving when they could not be together; this was the first time they had recorded an entire album in that fashion.

== Themes and composition ==
In 2019, in early planning sessions, Hawkins noted his plans for the album revolved around a lot of personal subject matter he was experiencing at the time:

"I've experienced a lot of emotions that I've never really experienced before in my life, and a lot of that is a result of moving to a different state that I've never lived in before. I'm leaving a lot of my family and friends eight hours away. It's being on a totally new terrain with my girlfriend, uncharted territory relationship wise, learning a lot about myself, so I've been experiencing a lot of emotions, positive and negative that I've been trying to dig into and navigate. I've also been doing counseling sessions with a counselor that I've trusted for the last few years who has been really insightful and sometimes a mystical mirror for me. He has brought a lot of interesting ideas to my mind when I open up and unload a lot of the thoughts that I'm having. That's been inspiring a lot of song ideas.

In 2022, Hawkins described it as "a lot of heavier songs and more aggressive than we've ever done in the past. It's very dense, there's a lot of layers on this album, there's a lot of movements". Undisclosed emergencies where band members' lives were in danger across 2020 and 2021 also helped shaped the album's themes, and the track "Valhalla" touches on what can be learned from those sorts of scenarios. On a whole, the album explores how the "beast side" of humanity can be redirected towards being a "protector rather than being a tyrant". The track "Tired of Winning", according to Hawkins, is about the negative aspects of never being happy or satisfied with one's life. "Turn it Up (Stand in the Fire) was described by the band as "unapologetic sonic rejection of the divisive, digitally drowned state of the world."

== Release and promotion ==
The album was released on October 14, 2022. An accompanying graphic novel themed around the album, titled Spirits Vol. 1, was scheduled for release sometime in early 2023. Two formal singles have been released to promote the album ahead of release, "Tired of Winning" on April 28, and "You Don't Know What Love Means" on August 13. Additionally, promotional song "Turn It Up Like (Stand in the Fire)" was released on March 22, 2022, with a music video releasing the following week. An extended version of "Tired of Winning" that merged the next track, "Ships in the Night", into the end of it, was released on July 29. The extended version of the song also appeared on the soundtrack for the September 2022 film The Retaliators.

== Track list ==
Spirits track listing
No.	Title	Length
1.	"Turn It Up Like (Stand in the Fire)"	4:30
2.	"Tired of Winning"	3:26
3.	"Ships in the Night"	2:15
4.	"You Don't Know What Love Means"	4:08
5.	"Don't Look Back"	3:48
6.	"The Other F Word"	3:38
7.	"Face It"	6:27
8.	"Best Times"	3:40
9.	"Déjà Vu"	3:43
10.	"Dream with Me"	4:29
11.	"Neverland"	1:57
12.	"Valhalla (Too Young to See)"	5:41
13.	"Spirits"	5:39
Total length:		53:27

Digital deluxe bonus tracks
No.	Title	Length
14.	"Best Times" (acoustic)	3:49
15.	"You Don't Know What Love Means" (piano version, featuring Taylor Acorn)	3:55
16.	"Best Times" (featuring Lacey Sturm)	3:44
17.	"Spirits" (live)	6:54
18.	"Tired of Winning/Ships in the Night" (live)	5:47
19.	"Face It" (live)	6:27
20.	"Tired of Winning" (AHEE & Cymek remix)	3:13
Total length:		86:05

== Personnel ==
Nothing More

- Jonny Hawkins – lead vocals
- Mark Vollelunga – guitars, backing vocals
- Daniel Oliver – bass, backing vocals, keyboards
- Ben Anderson – drums

== Charts ==
Chart performance for Spirits
Chart (2022)	Peak position
UK Album Downloads (OCC)	59
