= Don't Stop (Nothing More song) =

Promotional single by Nothing More featuring Jacoby Shaddix

from the album The Stories We Tell Ourselves
- Released: June 23, 2017
- Recorded: 2016–2017
- Genre: Hard rock
- Length: 4:15
- Label: Eleven Seven
- Songwriters: Nothing More; Will Hoffman; Drake McCrary; Paul O'Brien
- Producers: Jonny Hawkins; Nothing More

"Don't Stop" is a song by American rock band Nothing More. It was released as a promotional single off of their album The Stories We Tell Ourselves. Two versions of the song exist, the album version, and the single and music video version, which contains new guest vocals in the bridge by Papa Roach frontman Jacoby Shaddix.

== Background ==
"Don't Stop" was written and recording over the course of 2016 and 2017, while the band alternated between touring and writing and recording their fifth studio album, The Stories We Tell Ourselves. The song was leaked on June 16, 2017, due to a technical glitch on the band's website, and was immediately taken down. The song was officially released a week later, on June 23, at the same time as the album's first single, "Go to War". A lyric video was released at the same time. A promotional single and full-fledged music video was released on September 29, 2017, two weeks after the release of The Stories We Tell Ourselves. This version contains additional vocals in the bridge by Papa Roach frontman Jacoby Shaddix, alternating vocals with Nothing More frontman Jonny Hawkins. The music video alternates between footage of the band performing, and increasing numbers of people running through a city, away from special agent government men, with the people eventually arriving at the warehouse the band is performing in. Shaddix also appears in the video, where he emerges from the crowd to perform his part of the song.

== Composition and themes ==
The song was described as having an electronic and industrial beat, with an overall hard rock sound due to its "massive bass" and "soaring guitars". The song's sound was described as having elements of nu metal. Jonny Hawkins alternates between soaring, melodic vocals, and harsh, screamed vocals, throughout the song. The guest vocals provided by Jacoby Shaddix mirror these same traits, with the two creating a sound as if they are "facing off" against one another, chanting and screaming.

Lyrically, the song is about one pushing forward in one's inner struggles while embracing individuality and inner-strength to do so. It has been described as a "powerful, twisty anthem about not giving up", with Hawkins repeatedly pleading to the listener to "keep digging deep". The song was one from the album written during Hawkins' efforts to re-examine his life, his personal issues, and his role in society.

"'Don't Stop' has a lyric: 'My New Year's Resolution is to cut through the confusions.' That is a literal New Year's Resolution I made this last year. I had a very fun New Year's Eve, but I also had a very sobering moment in the month of January where I was by myself and a lot of things sunk in that had transpired in the last two years. I think that (finding) my own clarity about (my resolution) and documenting it – putting words to that process...will allow other people to find their own story or find clarity. I hope that will be the end result: that people will find clarity. Or better communication with people, which will allow for more love and understanding and greater things that we can do."

== Personnel ==
- Credits from album inlay booklet.

Band

- Jonny Hawkins – lead vocals
- Mark Vollelunga – guitar, backing vocals
- Daniel Oliver – bass, keyboards, backing vocals
- Ben Anderson – drums

Guest musicians

- Jacoby Shaddix - vocals
