= This Is the Time (Ballast) =

Single by Nothing More

from the album Nothing More
- Released: March 11, 2014; September 23, 2014 (acoustic)
- Genre: Alternative metal
- Length: 3:40
- Label: Eleven Seven
- Songwriters: Jonny Hawkins; Daniel Oliver; Will Hoffman; Mark Vollelunga; Scott Stevens; Paco Estrada
- Producers: Jonny Hawkins; Nothing More

Nothing More singles chronology
"This Is the Time (Ballast)" (2014)	"Mr. MTV" (2014)

"This Is the Time (Ballast)" is a song by American rock band Nothing More. The song was released as the lead single from the band's self-titled album. An acoustic version of the song was later released as a stand-alone single. The song was written by the band, Scott Stevens, Paco Estrada, and Will Hoffman.

== Music video ==
A music video was released for the song on April 22, 2014. The video begins with the intro track "Ocean Floor" and shows vocalist Jonny Hawkins at the bottom of an ocean, having recently broken free from a chain. The video then cuts to a scene of him walking towards the ocean, chained by the leg to a boulder. When "This Is the Time" begins, Hawkins drops the boulder into the ocean, sinking quickly to the bottom. He begins to struggle while trying to break free. He eventually does, and swims back to the surface. However, at this point, arms start emerging from the ocean's floor to drag him back down. Hawkins eventually breaks free, and is left alone on the beach.

== Chart positions ==
Chart	Peak positions
US Mainstream Rock (Billboard)	2
US Hot Rock & Alternative Songs (Billboard)	30
US Rock & Alternative Airplay (Billboard)	18
