= Do You Really Want It? =

Single by Nothing More

from the album The Stories We Tell Ourselves
- Released: December 19, 2017
- Recorded: 2016–2017
- Genre: Hard rock
- Length: 3:53
- Label: Eleven Seven Music
- Songwriters: Nothing More; Will Hoffman; Scott Stevens
- Producers: Nothing More; Will Hoffman

Nothing More singles chronology
"Go to War" (2017)	"Do You Really Want It?" (2017)	"Just Say When" (2018)

Music video
- "Do You Really Want It?" on YouTube

"Do You Really Want It?" is a song by American rock band Nothing More. It was their second single off of their album The Stories We Tell Ourselves. The song was released as a single on December 19, 2017, and as of April 2018, had peaked at number 6 on the Billboard Mainstream Rock Songs chart.

== Background ==
The song was first released as a single on December 19, 2017, alongside an accompanying music video. The song's music video features live footage of the band performing the song, filmed through the Tiny Planet app to give the image a fish eye lens effect. This was done to recreate the effect of seeing the band perform live, with the effect wrapping both the band and the crowd into the same frame. The footage was taken from their Denver and Dallas concerts in October and November 2017 respectively.

== Themes and composition ==
Lyrically, the song is centered around the concept that global change cannot occur without personal reflection, with lead singer Jonny Hawkins repeating the lines of "Everybody wants to change the world/ But no one ever wants to change themselves" and, "We can change it all/ If you really want it" throughout the course of the song. Hawkins explained the meaning behind the song's lyrics:

The most important thing is changing [one's] process of solving personal problems..starting with you asking, 'What do I bring to this equation that is causing this situation in my life?' versus the first instinct being to blame the things outside of you, whether that’s other people or situations. In some cases, the problem is someone else or just an unfortunate situation, for sure. It’s kind of counter-intuitive, but if everyone shifted that direction and started with, 'OK, what do I bring to the table that’s wrong and needs to be changed?' even if it’s just a tiny little bit, there’s so much more actual change and growth that would occur. Because the amount of control you have over other people and situations is so little, and the amount you have over yourself is so much greater.

== Personnel ==
- Credits from album inlay booklet.

Band

- Jonny Hawkins – lead vocals
- Mark Vollelunga – guitar, backing vocals
- Daniel Oliver – bass, keyboards, backing vocals
- Ben Anderson – drums

Production

- Will Hoffman - production
- Scott Stevens - additional production and vocal production

== Charts ==
Chart (2018)	Peak position
US Mainstream Rock (Billboard)	6
