= Jenny (Nothing More song) =

- Cover for the acoustic version

Single by Nothing More

from the album Nothing More
- Released: September 4, 2015
- Length: 3:56
- Label: Eleven Seven
- Songwriters: Jonny Hawkins, Daniel Oliver, Will Hoffman, Mark Vollelunga
- Producers: Jonny Hawkins, Nothing More

Nothing More singles chronology
"Mr. MTV" (2014)	"Jenny" (2015)	"Here's to the Heartache" (2015)

Music video
- "Jenny" on YouTube

"Jenny" is a song from American rock band Nothing More. As the third single from their self titled album, the song discusses the struggles with mental illness that Jenna, the sister of Nothing More lead vocalist Jonny Hawkins, has. Team Rock has noted that the song has been particularly successful on music streaming services, having more than 106 million streams on Spotify and more than 27 million views on YouTube as of May 2025.

== Background and writing ==
The song was written about Jenny, the aunt of lead vocalist Jonny Hawkins, and Jenna, his sister. Jenny has schizophrenia while Jenna has bipolar disorder. Following the release of the album in July 2014, the band partnered with Bring Change 2 Mind, The Jed Foundation, The International Bipolar Foundation, Young Minds (UK) and To Write Love on Her Arms.

== Live performances ==
In May and June 2015, the ensemble performed the "Jenny Tour", spanning the Midwestern, East South Central and East Coast regions of the United States in addition to Colorado and Alberta.

== Charts ==
=== Weekly charts ===
Chart (2015)	Peak positions
US Mainstream Rock (Billboard)	6
US Rock & Alternative Airplay (Billboard)	25
US Hot Rock & Alternative Songs (Billboard)	31

=== Year-end charts ===
Chart (2015)	Positions
US Hot Rock Songs (Billboard)	93

== Certifications ==
Region	Certification	Certified units/sales
United States (RIAA)	Gold	500,000^{‡}
^{‡} Sales+streaming figures based on certification alone.
