= The Stories We Tell Ourselves =

Studio album by Nothing More
- Released: September 15, 2017
- Recorded: 2016–2017
- Genre: Hard rock; alternative metal
- Length: 58:53
- Label: Eleven Seven
- Producer: Nothing More; Will Hofman

Nothing More chronology
Nothing More (2014)	The Stories We Tell Ourselves (2017)	Spirits (2022)

Singles from Nothing More
- 1. "Go to War" Released: June 23, 2017; 2. "Do You Really Want It?" Released: December 19, 2017; 3. "Just Say When" Released: April 27, 2018; 4. "Let 'Em Burn" Released: December 4, 2018

The Stories We Tell Ourselves is the fifth studio album by the American rock band Nothing More, which was released on September 15, 2017. It is the band's second album to be released through Eleven Seven Music. The album's first single, "Go to War", topped the Billboard US Mainstream Rock Songs chart in November 2017. The band received three Grammy Award nominations related to the album; Best Rock Performance and Best Rock Song for "Go to War", and Best Rock Album for the album itself. A second single, "Do You Really Want It", was released in December 2017, while a number of promotional singles, such as "Don't Stop", were released across 2017 as well. A third single, "Just Say When", was released in April 2018. The album's fourth single, "Let 'Em Burn", was released in December 2018.

== Writing and recording ==
Work on the album began at the beginning of 2016, and was written and recorded across 2016 and 2017. The band continued the approach of writing and recording the album in their own home studio, similar to their prior two albums, The Few Not Fleeting and Nothing More; frontman Jonny Hawkins felt that technology had advanced enough to create a professional sounding album with their own home equipment, and this allowed them to work outside of the time and money constraints of working in a professional studio, and work in the comfort of their own living spaces. The band would self-produce the album as well, alongside long-time band collaborator and manager Will Hoffman. Generally, the band members would work separately in different rooms of the house, recording their respective parts and then sharing them with each other through Google Drive. Once they were happy with complete songs, they'd send them to Hoffman, who performed final audio mixing duties. Emphasis was placed on making the listener feel something emotionally over technically proficient performances.

By September 2016, the band had 17 fully developed songs, and were contemplating whether or not any songs should be trimmed from the final track listing. The band took a break from recording at this point to tour with Disturbed and Chevelle throughout the end of the year, before returning to complete the recording of the album in early 2017. The band co-wrote two songs with guitarist Clint Lowery of Sevendust - "Tunnels" and "Funny Little Creatures", who also contributed guitar to the tracks as well.

== Themes and composition ==
Conceptually, the album is about the interactivity of three types of relationships - between oneself and another person, between oneself and society, and between oneself and their own self-understanding and self-awareness. The lyrics were influenced by a wide variety of sources. Hawkins, the band's primary lyricist, stated that much of the album's lyrics were inspired by what the band had been through in the years since their prior album, with him describing it as "not a hypothetical record. It's a very real, experientially-influenced record". Writing the song's lyrics was Hawkins' way of working through his recent personal issues, and the issues he had experienced around him in the years prior to the album's release.

In the political world, I felt like I was watching two sides that I didn't have a dog in either fight, and I felt like the stories that people were parroting and echoing in these echo chambers of people who agreed with them were many times half-truths. So this record is really focused on a personal process of being more skeptical of what people say out there, what the media says and also being more skeptical of what your own mind is telling you about your own feelings and where they're coming from, why you're feeling it and is it really someone else's fault or is it something you need to deal with.

- Frontman Jonny Hawkins on the political influence on the album's lyrics.

Some lyrics were inspired by people met by Hawkins at a grief counselling session he attended with his father over the death of his mother. The tracks "Just Say When" and "Go to War" were written about his recent divorce from his ex-wife. Another large influence on the album's writing was his frustration with the social and political climate leading up to the 2016 U.S. Presidential Election. With both, lyrics were inspired by Hawkins' process of sifting through the details to determine what was "actual reality" versus what was just "thoughts about reality" or rather "the stories we tell ourselves". The song "Do You Really Want It?" explores the idea of whether or not global change can occur without personal reflection, repeating the line "Everybody wants to change the world, but one thing's clear: No one ever wants to change themselves". The song opts to close on a more hopeful tone, rather than accusatory, repeating the line "We can change it all". Other inspiration came from a wide variety of writers that the band read during the time, ranging from Carl Jung, to C. S. Lewis on the song, "The Great Divorce". Spoken word parts by another influence, British philosopher Alan Watts, are inter-dispersed throughout the album. While much of the song's lyrics were centered around hardships and frustrations, the track "Who We Are" focuses on more positive relationships, primarily the strong friendships between band members, and a newly formed romantic relationship by Hawkins after his divorce that changed his more pessimistic views on relationships.

The album's sound was described as primarily having a "heavy rock sound" by rock music website Loudwire, with a variety of different rock and metal influences and subgenre being heard in various individual tracks. HM Magazine described the album as "blending hooks that could be straight out of pop anthems with hardcore guitar riffs, mathcore rhythms, and perfectly executed balance between clean and dirty vocals." Loudwire described the track "Let 'Em Burn" as being a high energy song with "forceful" drums, "catchy beat", and vocals that start as a "garbled guttural voice" before erupting into a full scream. Similarly, the song "Ripping Me Apart" has a "chugging guitar line" with Hawkins screaming the song's title over it. Hawkins' vocals on the track were described as combining Chester Bennington's screaming and Chris Cornell's soaring vocals. "Don't Stop" was described as having "nu metal rhythms" with a more pop rock influenced chorus, while "The Great Divorce" was described as "synthy post-hardcore. Contrary to the rest of the album, the track "Just Say When" has been described as an acoustic ballad, consisting of just vocals, acoustic guitar, and strings, and having a pop punk ballad influence.

== Release and promotion ==
A number of songs were released to promote the album's release. The song's first single, "Go to War", was released on June 23, 2017. The song performed well, topping the Billboard US Mainstream Rock Songs chart. Four other song's in total were released ahead of the album's release as well, including "Don't Stop", "Let 'Em Burn", "Just Say When", and "Who We Are". In the album's release month, the band also released an alternate version of "Don't Stop", featuring a new guest vocal performance by Papa Roach frontman Jacoby Shaddix in the song's bridge.

The album was released on September 15, 2017. The album debuted at number 15 on the Billboard 200 all-format album chart, selling approximately 20,000 copies in its first week. In November 2017, the album was nominated for a Grammy Award for Best Rock Album, while "Go to War" received two Grammy Award nominations for Best Rock Song and Best Rock Performance. The three cumulative Grammy Nominations from the album made the band the most nominated rock band for the 60th Annual Grammy Awards.

The band released a music video for their second single, "Do You Really Want It?" on December 19, 2017, which had peaked at number 25 on the Mainstream Rock Songs chart as of January 2018. At the end of 2017, the CEO of the band's record label mentioned future plans of releasing "Just Say When" as a single as well. which was later done in April 2018. A fourth single, "Let 'Em Burn", was released in December 2018.

== Reception ==
Professional ratings
Review scores
Source	Rating
AllMusic	(Positive)
Alternative Press	4/5 stars
Metal Hammer/Team Rock	4/5 stars
AXS	5/5 stars
HM Magazine	4/5 stars
Loudwire	Positive
The Music (AU)	4/5 stars

The album was generally well received by critics. Loudwire described it as one of their best reviewed albums of 2017, stating "The Stories We Tell Ourselves isn't so much a gigantic leap forward for the San Antonio, Texas based alternative act as it is a showcase in maturity in both musicianship and in singer Jonny Hawkins ripping it out over the grinding grooves, much of them courtesy of guitarist Mark Vollelunga...To say that Nothing More has cranked it up a few notches since their major label debut four years ago would be a disservice to just how much they've shifted things into the stratosphere." They later ranked it as the second-best hard rock album of 2017 in the end of year retrospective as well. Alternative Press praised the album for having "more hooks, more layers, more feeling—more everything" and concluded that "While the divisive nü-metal influences remain, the diversity of mood, tone and instrumentation makes for a deeper, more fluid and more engaging collection." Similarly, AllMusic praised the album for "showcas[ing] more of the San Antonio-based band's deeply emotive, metal-tinged rock...the album finds them digging even deeper into a set of songs rife with anthemic choruses and visceral grooves". Metal Hammer/Team Rock praised the album for covering so many different styles of rock music across such a long album (18 songs), concluding that "Eighteen tracks is a long time to stay interesting, but Nothing More nail it...The Stories We Tell Ourselves can only be described as an expertly executed musical buffet." HM Magazine praised the band's ability to be socially aware while avoiding rock music stereotypes and tropes with the album, concluding that "Nothing More has created something important with Stories. With its universally-relatable material, it avoids the archaic trap of drugs, sex, and rock and roll. Like many socially-aware punk, metal or rock acts that have come before them, Nothing More reinforces the need to touch on social constructs, relationships, and the complexity of carrying on a family bloodline. With these Stories, the world is gifted something amazing."

Australian magazine The Music praised the album for "tread[ing] that fine line between writing ultra-catchy, anthemic, adrenaline-pumping rock music, and taking their music in innovative directions while remaining interesting at all times", concluding that it was one of the best rock albums of 2017.

=== Album awards ===
Year	Ceremony	Award	Result
2017	60th Grammy Awards	Best Rock Album	Nominated
2017	60th Grammy Awards	Best Rock Performance ("Go to War")	Nominated
2017	60th Grammy Awards	Best Rock Song ("Go to War")	Nominated

== Track listing ==
No.	Title	Writer(s)	Length
1.	"(Ambition; Destruction)"	Nothing More, Will Hoffman	0:18
2.	"Do You Really Want It?"	Nothing More, Hoffman, Scott Stevens	3:53
3.	"(Convict; Divide)"	Nothing More, Hoffman	0:41
4.	"Let 'Em Burn"	Nothing More, Hoffman, Paco Estrada	3:56
5.	"Ripping Me Apart"	Nothing More, Hoffman, Estrada	4:04
6.	"Don't Stop"	Nothing More, Hoffman, Drake McCrary, Paul O'Brien	4:15
7.	"Funny Little Creatures"	Nothing More, Clint Lowery	3:28
8.	"(React; Respond)"	Nothing More, Hoffman	2:29
9.	"The Great Divorce"	Nothing More, Hoffman, McCrary, O'Brien	4:39
10.	"Still in Love"	Nothing More, Hoffman	4:36
11.	"(Alone; Together)"	Nothing More, Hoffman	1:31
12.	"Go to War"	Nothing More, Hoffman, David Pramik	4:05
13.	"Just Say When"	Nothing More, Hoffman, Estrada	3:42
14.	"(Accept; Disconnect)"	Nothing More, Hoffman	1:54
15.	"Who We Are"	Nothing More, Hoffman, Stevens	3:26
16.	"Tunnels"	Nothing More, Lowery	4:11
17.	"(End; Begin)"	Nothing More, Hoffman, Stevens	1:40
18.	"Fadein/Fadeout"	Nothing More, Hoffman	6:05
Total length:			58:53

== Personnel ==
- Credits from album inlay booklet.

Band

- Jonny Hawkins – lead vocals
- Mark Vollelunga – guitar, backing vocals
- Daniel Oliver – bass, keyboards, backing vocals
- Ben Anderson – drums

Guest musicians

- Clint Lowery – guitar on "Funny Little Creatures" and "Tunnels"
- Ryan Delahoussaye – strings on "Just Say When" and "Fade In/Fade Out"
- Tony Rodgers – cello on "Just Say When" and "Fade In/Fade Out"
- Mikey Sanchez – backing vocals on "Fade In/Fade Out"
- Alexia Rodriguez – additional vocals on "The Great Divorce"
- Alan Watts – spoken word samples on "(Convict; Divide)", "(React; Respond)", "(Accept; Disconnect)" and "(End; Begin)"

Production

- Will Hoffman – production
- Scott Stevens – additional production and vocal production on "Do You Really Want It?" and "Who We Are"

== Charts ==
Chart (2017)	Peak position
Canadian Albums (Billboard)	67
US Billboard 200	15
US Independent Albums (Billboard)	2
US Top Hard Rock Albums (Billboard)	2
