= The Few Not Fleeting =

Studio album by Nothing More
- Released: February 21, 2009
- Genres: Progressive rock; hard rock; alternative rock
- Length: 42:19
- Label: Vestia Entertainment

Nothing More chronology
Save You/Save Me (2007)	The Few Not Fleeting (2009)	Nothing More (2014)

Singles from Nothing More
- 1. "Salem (Burn the Witch)" Released: September 1, 2020; 2. "Fell in Love With a Ghost" Released: October 23, 2020

Professional ratings
Review scores
Source	Rating
Sputnikmusic	4/5

The Few Not Fleeting is the third studio album by American rock band Nothing More. It was released on February 21, 2009 through Vestia Entertainment. It is notable for being the first album featuring Jonny Hawkins as the lead vocalist, who previously served as the band's drummer.

== Background ==
While often seen as Nothing More's first studio album due to the lack of availability of prior releases, it is actually the band's third studio album. Tracing back the band's origins, band member Jonny Hawkins began playing drums as early as the seventh grade, which is around the time he met guitarist Mark Vollelunga, by hearing him play guitar at a church camp. The two became friends, and would hold informal jam sessions together with other students throughout their middle and high school years. In 2003, Hawkins and Vollelunga officially formed the band, with core member and bassist Daniel Oliver joining in 2004.

Around the end of high school, the band began recording music and touring locally, which they did for years, plagued by lineup changes and the inability to garner a contract from a record label. In 2004, the band released the more funk-influenced album Shelter with vocalist Josh Klaus and second guitarist Josh Kercheville. Klaus left and was replaced by Travis Cox, who recorded the EP Madhatter's Bliss in 2005. A compilation album, Vandura, largely consisting of tracks from the first two releases, was also released in 2006. Cox was later replaced by singer Trey Graham, who had previously toured with Kelly Clarkson. The band found some form of success in the release, releasing the album Save You/Save Me in 2007 and touring with Thirty Seconds to Mars and getting on to The Warped Tour, but ultimately felt unhappy with the compromise of moving in a more mainstream pop influence from Graham, and parted ways with the singer. Around the same time, Kercheville left the band as well, leaving the band as a trio.

== Writing and recording ==
By mid-2008, the band was at a crossroads. Hawkins began struggling with depression, due to a number of personal issues, ranging from his mother's diagnosis, and death, from cancer, the end of a five year romantic relationship, and stress from turnover in band membership. Additionally, the band had won a "battle of the bands" contest prior to losing Graham and Kercheville, but collecting the prize money and instruments they had won required them to perform a showcase in front of record label executives. Feeling a drastic change was in order, Hawkins decided, after over 8 years as the band's drummer, to instead become the band's frontman and lead vocalist. While the performance, having Hawkins do drums and vocals concurrently, did not go over well, his instinct was that this was the correct direction for the band to pursue ultimately. Despite Hawkins lack of formal experience in singing, and even general fear of public speaking, he garnered the support of remaining members Vollelunga and Oliver, and the band pushed forward, opting to use fill-in temporary drummers for live performances moving forward. The members saw this as a new beginning for the band, and later even removed the prior recording from any sort of retail space, feeling it no longer represented the band.

Throughout 2008 and early 2009, the band worked on recording their first album with Hawkins as the lead vocalist, which would eventually be titled The Few Not Fleeting. Hawkins largely drew from the aforementioned personal issues for lyrical material on the album, and it largely being created by the core trio, the band was able to delve farther into their preferred music stylings, which was more of a progressive rock, alternative rock, and hard rock direction than prior releases. The album recorded in Hawkins' home studio, allowing the band to not be constrained money or time restraints in the studio, which in turn improved the release's overall sound quality as well.

== Release and promotion ==
The album was released on February 21, 2009. The band toured in support of the album for two years.

== Track listing ==
No.	Title	Length
1.	"Gone"	3:24
2.	"Salem (Burn the Witch)"	3:47
3.	"Fat Kid"	2:37
4.	"Waiting on Rain"	3:22
5.	"The Cleansing"	4:14
6.	"Blue and Gold"	3:57
7.	"Dirge"	0:39
8.	"Fell In Love with a Ghost"	3:19
9.	"The Few Not Fleeting"	3:47
10.	"Bullets and Blue Eyes"	3:36
11.	"Love"	4:16
12.	"It Seems"	5:22

== Personnel ==
Band

- Jonny Hawkins – lead vocals, drums, programming
- Mark Vollelunga – guitar, backing vocals
- Daniel Oliver – bass, backing vocals

Additional musicians

- Josh Kercheville – additional guitar on tracks 5 and 6
- Paco Estrada – guest vocals on track 10
