= Nothing More (album) =

Studio album by Nothing More
- Released: June 24, 2014
- Recorded: 2011–2013
- Genre: Alternative metal; hard rock; progressive metal
- Length: 62:03
- Label: Eleven Seven
- Producer: Will Hoffman, Nothing More

Nothing More chronology
The Few Not Fleeting (2009)	Nothing More (2014)	The Stories We Tell Ourselves (2017)

Singles from Nothing More
- 1. "This Is the Time (Ballast)" Released: March 11, 2014; 2. "Mr. MTV" Released: September 21, 2014; 3. "Jenny" Released: September 4, 2015; 4. "Here's to the Heartache" Released: October 13, 2015

Professional ratings
Review scores
Source	Rating
AllMusic	Positive

Nothing More is the fourth studio album by the American rock band Nothing More. The album was released on June 24, 2014, and it is the Nothing More's first album with the prominent independent rock label Eleven Seven Music. The songs on Nothing More deal with an array of subject matter such as the mixture of religion, corporations, mental illness, and capitalism.

== Themes and composition ==
In explaining the song "Mr. MTV", frontman Jonny Hawkins explained, "It's not just about MTV specifically, but we use them as an example for a path that many individuals or other companies can go down in life when they choose to value money or ratings or something more than doing something that's, I think, bigger than all that." He further expanded that it "speaks to vacancy of idealism in a world ruled by capitalism and the almighty dollar." The song "Christ Copyright" contains a similar message, with Hawkins explaining that "Christ Copyright is still about the [Mr.] MTV thing. It's serious but it's also like we're playing with the words a little bit because we found it funny to take a word like 'Christ' which is a religious icon and take the word 'Copyright' which is a business sign. In American spirituality or religion, which was a pure thing, have been now mixed with marketing and corporations." He also said its message is to "dar[e] the listener to maintain moral integrity and challenge the social normative." "Jenny" was written about Hawkins' sister, Jenna; who struggles with bipolar depression. The music video for the song is a depiction of Jenny's life. "Gyre" and "Pyre", meanwhile, are instrumental pieces that contain samples of speeches by the philosopher, Alan Watts.

== Promotion and release ==
The album's lead single, "This Is the Time (Ballast)", was released on March 11, 2014. An acoustic recording was later released as a stand-alone single on September 23. A music video was released for the album's second single, "Mr. MTV", on September 21 via the band's YouTube and Vevo accounts. A video for the single "Jenny" was released on April 6, 2015. A fourth single was also released – "Here's to the Heartache".

The album was released on June 4, 2014. It debuted at number 33 on the Billboard 200 all-format album chart, selling 8,600 copies in its opening week.

== Track listing ==
All tracks are written by Nothing More, except noted tracks, written by Nothing More and additional writers.

No.	Title	Writer(s)	Length
1.	"Ocean Floor"		0:58
2.	"This Is the Time (Ballast)"	Paco Estrada, Will Hoffman, Scott Stevens	3:40
3.	"Christ Copyright"		3:17
4.	"Mr. MTV"		3:59
5.	"First Punch"	Stevens, Hoffman	3:22
6.	"The Matthew Effect"	Hoffman, Jasen Rauch	3:16
7.	"I'll Be OK"		4:46
8.	"Here's to the Heartache"	Estrada, Hoffman, Stevens	4:17
9.	"If I Were"	Stevens, Hoffman	3:32
10.	"Friendly Fire"		3:43
11.	"Sex & Lies"	Estrada, Hoffman	4:13
12.	"Surface Flames"		2:21
13.	"Take a Bullet"	Will Hoffman	3:56
14.	"Jenny"	Estrada, Hoffman	3:56
15.	"God Went North"	Estrada, Hoffman	6:09

Japanese edition bonus track
No.	Title	Length
16.	"This Is the Time (Ballast)" (Acoustic)	4:41

Digital track list
No.	Title	Writer(s)	Length
1.	"Ocean Floor"		0:58
2.	"This Is the Time (Ballast)"	Estrada, Hoffman, Stevens	3:40
3.	"Christ Copyright"		3:17
4.	"Mr. MTV"		3:59
5.	"First Punch"	Stevens, Hoffman	3:22
6.	"Gyre"		2:57
7.	"The Matthew Effect"	Hoffman, Rauch	3:16
8.	"I'll Be OK"		4:46
9.	"Here's to the Heartache"	Estrada, Hoffman, Stevens	4:17
10.	"If I Were"	Stevens, Hoffman	3:32
11.	"Friendly Fire"		3:43
12.	"Sex & Lies"	Estrada, Hoffman	4:13
13.	"Surface Flames"		2:21
14.	"Take a Bullet"	Will Hoffman	3:56
15.	"Jenny"	Estrada, Hoffman	3:56
16.	"God Went North"	Estrada, Hoffman	6:09
17.	"Pyre"		9:54

Vinyl release (Side A)
No.	Title	Writer(s)	Length
1.	"Ocean Floor"		0:58
2.	"This Is the Time (Ballast)"	Estrada, Hoffman, Stevens	3:40
3.	"Christ Copyright"		3:17
4.	"Mr. MTV"		3:59
5.	"Gyre"		2:57
6.	"I'll Be OK"		4:46

Vinyl release (Side B)
No.	Title	Writer(s)	Length
1.	"Surface Flames"		2:21
2.	"Take a Bullet"	Hoffman	3:56
3.	"Jenny"	Estrada, Hoffman	3:56
4.	"God Went North"	Estrada, Hoffman	6:09
5.	"Pyre"		9:54

10th anniversary edition
No.	Title	Writer(s)	Length
1.	"Ocean Floor" (2024 Remaster)		0:58
2.	"This Is the Time (Ballast)" (2024 Remaster)	Estrada, Hoffman, Stevens	3:40
3.	"Christ Copyright" (2024 Remaster)		3:17
4.	"Mr. MTV" (2024 Remaster)		3:59
5.	"First Punch" (2024 Remaster)	Stevens, Hoffman	3:22
6.	"Gyre" (2024 Remaster)		2:57
7.	"The Matthew Effect" (2024 Remaster)	Hoffman, Rauch	3:16
8.	"I'll Be OK" (2024 Remaster)		4:46
9.	"Here's to the Heartache" (2024 Remaster)	Estrada, Hoffman, Stevens	4:17
10.	"If I Were" (2024 Remaster)	Stevens, Hoffman	3:32
11.	"Friendly Fire" (2024 Remaster)		3:43
12.	"Sex & Lies" (2024 Remaster)	Estrada, Hoffman	4:13
13.	"Surface Flames" (2024 Remaster)		2:21
14.	"Take a Bullet" (2024 Remaster)	Hoffman	3:56
15.	"Jenny" (2024 Remaster)	Estrada Hoffman	3:56
16.	"God Went North" (2024 Remaster)	Estrada, Hoffman	6:09
17.	"Pyre" (2024 Remaster)		9:54
18.	"This is the Time (Ballast)" (Remix) (2024 Remaster)	Estrada, Hoffman, Stevens	4:33
19.	"Jenny" (Acoustic) (2024 Remaster)	Estrada, Hoffman	3:35
20.	"This is the Time (Ballast)" (Acoustic) (2024 Remaster)	Estrada, Hoffman, Stevens	4:41

10th anniversary edition bonus digital tracks
No.	Title	Writer(s)	Length
21.	"Here's to the Heartache" (Piano version) (2024 Remaster)	Estrada, Hoffman, Stevens	4:20
22.	"Mr. MTV" (Live on SiriusXM) (2024 Remaster)		3:39

== Personnel ==
- Jonny Hawkins – lead vocals, drums on This Is the Time (Ballast), The Matthew Effect, If I Were, I'll Be OK, God Went North, verses of Mr. MTV
- Mark Vollelunga – guitar, backing vocals
- Daniel Oliver – bass, keyboards, backing vocals
- Paul O'Brien – drums, percussion on all other tracks, drums on Mr. MTV (choruses)
- Paco Estrada – songwriter, backing vocals

== Charts ==
Album charts
Chart (2014)	Position
US Billboard 200	33
US Digital Albums	19
US Hard Rock Albums	3
US Independent Albums	8
US Rock Albums	11

Singles charts
Title	Year	Peak chart positions			Album
Title	Year	Mainstream Rock Songs	Hot Rock Songs	Rock Airplay	Album
"This Is the Time (Ballast)"	2014	2	30	18	Nothing More
"Mr. MTV"	2014	12	—	42	Nothing More
"Jenny"	2015	6	31	25	Nothing More
"Here's to the Heartache"	2015	4	46	21	Nothing More
