= Go to War =

Single by Nothing More

from the album The Stories We Tell Ourselves
- Released: June 23, 2017
- Genre: Hard rock
- Length: 4:05
- Label: Eleven Seven
- Songwriters: Will Hoffman, Nothing More, David Pramik
- Producers: Jonny Hawkins, Nothing More

Nothing More singles chronology
"Here's to the Heartache" (2015)	"Go to War" (2017)	"Do You Really Want It?" (2017)

Music video
- "Go to War" on YouTube

"Go to War" is a song by American rock band Nothing More. It was released on June 23, 2017 as the first single off of the band's fifth album The Stories We Tell Ourselves. The song performed well commercially and critically, topping the Billboard Mainstream Rock chart and receiving two Grammy Award nominations Best Rock Song and Best Rock Performance, for the 2018 Grammys.

== Background ==
Contrary to the band normal process for song writing, where song ideas are written and tweaked for months until they are finalized, "Go to War" was written in a span of around 30 minutes, with lyrics improvised on the spot. Frontman Jonny Hawkins, the band's primary writer, explained:

"I was going through the end of an eight-year relationship. I was dealing with some stuff, and I got off the phone, and I was angrier than I've ever been. I was never one to yell a lot or get into super-big, dramatic fights or anything like that; I'm pretty laid back. But I'd gotten to that point, was on the edge, and we had it out with each other over the phone, and I was just fuming. At the end of eight-years of stuff that had kind of built up – I looked at [guitarist] Mark [Vollelunga], and I was like, 'Let’s get in the studio now! Play that guitar part you were playing yesterday.' And so Mark started to play it, and I just started singing stuff, and it was about 30 minutes later that the bulk of that song was done. So, some of them came out quick like that and were unusual for us.

The song was released as the first single off from The Stories We Tell Ourselves first released on June 23, 2017, alongside promotional single "Don't Stop" and lyric videos for both tracks. A full-fledged music video was recorded on June 1, at the Lacy St. Production Center in Los Angeles, and later released on June 26. The music video takes place in a bar, and consists of alternating footage of the band performing, and people in the bar verbally and physically fighting one another. In July, the song was also played for television commercials for the film War for the Planet of the Apes. The song was additionally used in a trailer for the video game Paladins. An alternate, acoustic recording song was released for streaming on the internet as well.

== Themes and composition ==
Lyrically, the song's theme is related to the concept of trust. Jonny Hawkins explained, "Trust is the foundation of every relationship. As trust erodes, our need for control grows. 'Go To War' is about how we circle the problem, unknowingly spinning the web tighter. If you circle enough, it becomes a spiral. If you spiral enough, it becomes a war." Hawkins also stated that the song was inspired from a particularly negative conversation he had after getting a divorce. Billboard interpreted the song to be about how people "aim to score points instead of resolve conflicts".

Musically, the song has been described as "percussion-heavy" with a "Depeche Mode-esque beat" and "hammered down guitar licks. Loudwire described Hawkins' vocals as possessing a quite-loud dynamic, alternating from a "restrained vulnerable" and a "primal catharsis" sound that captured the early stages of a "relationship gone wrong".

== Reception ==
The song performed well commercially and critically. It topped the Billboard US Mainstream Rock Songs chart in November 2017, the band's first song to do so. It also received multiple nominations for best rock song in 2017. It received two Grammy Award nominations Best Rock Song and Best Rock Performance, for the 2018 Grammys. It additionally received a nomination for "Best Rock Song" for the iHeartRadio Music Awards. The song was also strongly praised by rock and metal music website Loudwire, who named it one of their top songs of 2017, and nominated for top hard rock song of the year for their Loudwire Music Awards. It did not win the award, but was still named Loudwire's staff pick for best hard rock song of 2017. The song also fared well with Loudwire's readers/listener's with the website's "Cage Match" voting polls, with it being put into its "Hall of Fame" due to winning the vote five times in a row, including winning over The Foo Fighters "Run", Highly Suspect's "Little One", Greta Van Fleet's "Highway Tune", Prophets of Rage's "Living on the 110", and Skillet's "The Resistance".

== Track listing ==
Digital download
No.	Title	Length
1.	"Go To War"	4:05
Total length:		4:05

== Personnel ==
- Jonny Hawkins – lead vocals
- Daniel Oliver – bass, keyboards, backing vocals
- Mark Vollelunga – guitar, backing vocals
- Ben Anderson – drums

== Charts ==
Chart (2017)	Peak position
US Mainstream Rock (Billboard)	1
US Rock Airplay (Billboard)	13
US Hot Rock Songs (Billboard)	23

== Certifications ==
Region	Certification	Certified units/sales
United States (RIAA)	Gold	500,000^{‡}
^{‡} Sales+streaming figures based on certification alone.
