= Nothing More =

American rock band

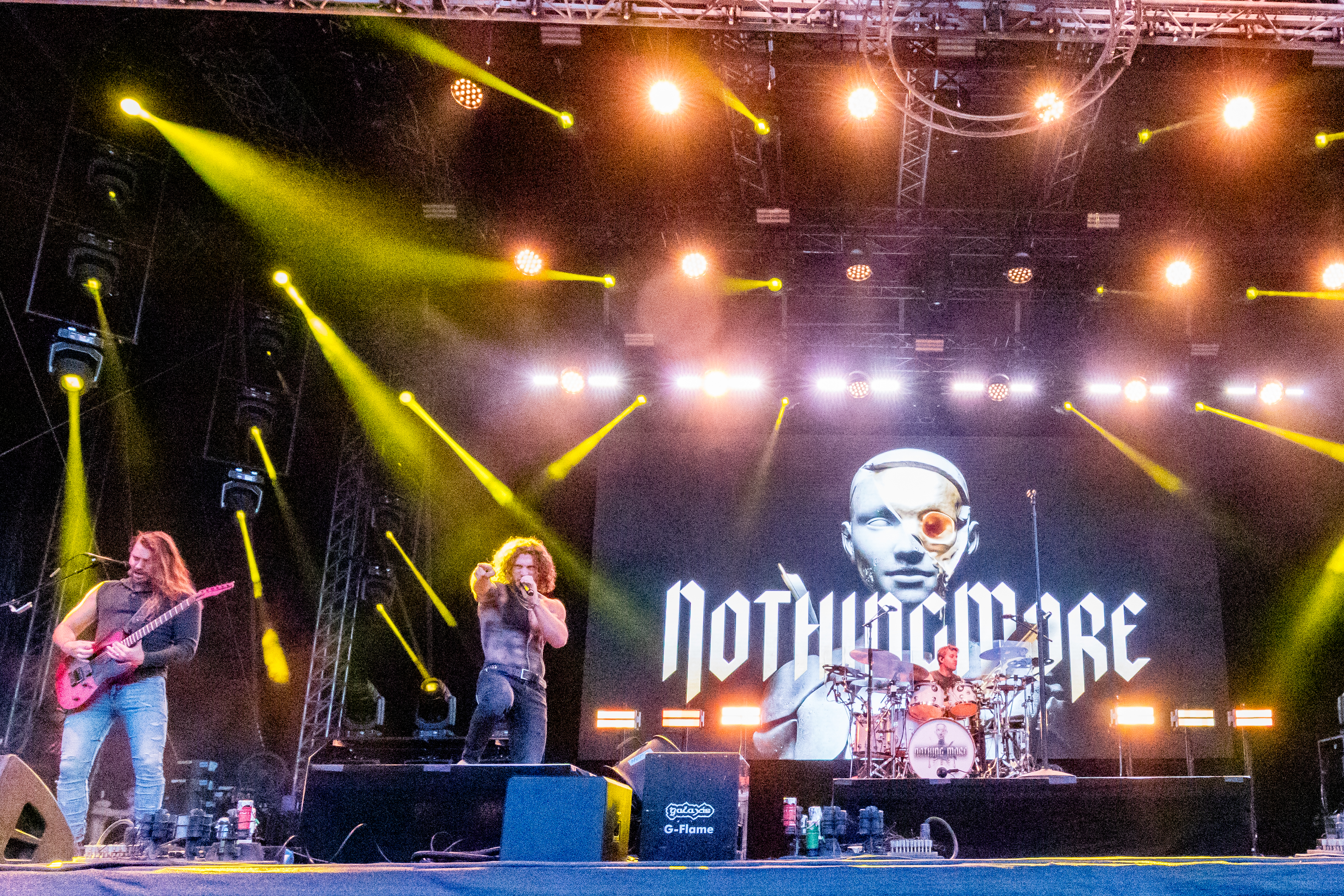
- Nothing More performing in 2025

Background information
- Origin: San Antonio, Texas, U.S.
- Genres: Alternative rock; alternative metal; hard rock; progressive rock
- Years active: 2003–present
- Labels: Eleven Seven; Better Noise; Vestia Entertainment
- Members: Jonny Hawkins; Mark Vollelunga; Daniel Oliver; Ben Anderson
- Past members: Josh Kercheville; Josh Klaus; Matt Reynolds; Travis Cox; Trey Graham; Devin Travieso; Paul O'Brien
- Website: nothingmore.net

Nothing More is an American rock band from San Antonio, Texas. Formed in 2003, the band spent much of the 2000s recording independent albums and struggling to maintain a steady lineup or attract record label interest. Towards the end of the decade, the band's long-time drummer, Jonny Hawkins, decided to switch to being the band's frontman and lead vocalist, stabilizing the band's core lineup along with other long-time members Mark Vollelunga (guitar) and Daniel Oliver (bass). The band self-funded and recorded their fourth studio album, Nothing More, over the course of three years and used it to gain the attention of Eleven Seven Music record label, who signed the band to a five album record contract upon hearing it. The album became the band's breakthrough release in 2014, with multiple charting singles, including "This is the Time (Ballast)", which hit number 1 on the Mediabase Active Rock chart and number 2 on the Billboard Mainstream Rock chart, and "Mr. MTV", "Jenny" and "Here's to the Heartache" all charting in the top 15 of both charts.

The band began working on a follow-up in 2016 while continuing to tour in support of their self-titled release, and in September 2017, released their fifth studio album - their second on a major record label - The Stories We Tell Ourselves. The lead single, "Go to War", outperformed the prior singles, topping the Mainstream Rock chart, and the release earned the band three Grammy Award nominations; Best Rock Album for the album, and Best Rock Song and Best Rock Performance for "Go to War". The band continued to promote the release moving into 2018, releasing singles, "Do You Really Want It?" and "Just Say When", and embarking on multiple North American tours into 2019.

Their sixth studio album, Spirits, was released on October 14, 2022. Their seventh studio album, Carnal, was released on June 28, 2024.

== History ==
=== Formation and early independent releases (2000–2010) ===
Band member Jonny Hawkins began playing drums as early as the seventh grade, which is around the time he met guitarist Mark Vollelunga, by hearing him play guitar at a church camp. The two became friends, and would hold informal jam sessions together with other students throughout their middle and high school years. In 2003, Hawkins and Vollelunga officially formed the band.

Around the end of high school, the band began recording music and touring locally, which they did for years, plagued by lineup changes and the inability to garner a contract from a record label. In 2004, the band released the more funk-influenced album Shelter with vocalist Josh Klaus, bassist Matt Reynolds, and second guitarist Josh Kercheville. Klaus, followed shortly by Reynolds, were replaced in 2004 by Travis Cox and Daniel Oliver, respectively; they recorded and released the EP Madhatter's Bliss in July 2005. A compilation album, Vandura, largely consisting of the tracks from the first two releases, was also released in May 2006. Cox was later replaced by singer Trey Graham, who had previously toured with Kelly Clarkson. The band found some form of success in the release, releasing the album Save You/Save Me in 2007 and touring with Thirty Seconds to Mars and getting on to The Warped Tour, but ultimately felt unhappy with the compromise of moving in a more pop, mainstream influence from Graham, and parted ways with the singer. Around the same time, Kercheville left the band as well, leaving the band as a trio.

By mid-2008, the band was at a crossroads. Hawkins began struggling with depression, due to a number of personal issues, ranging from his mother's diagnosis, and eventual death, from cancer, the end of a five-year romantic relationship, and stress from turnover in band membership. Additionally, the band had won a "battle of the bands" contest prior to losing Graham and Kercheville, but collecting the prize money and instruments they had won required them to perform a showcase in front of record label executives. Feeling a drastic change was in order, Hawkins decided, after over eight years as the band's drummer, to instead become the band's frontman and lead vocalist. While the performance, having Hawkins do drums and vocals concurrently, did not go over well, his instinct was that this was the correct direction for the band to pursue ultimately. Despite Hawkins' lack of formal experience in singing, and even general fear of public speaking, he garnered the support of remaining members Vollelunga and Oliver, and the band pushed forward, opting to use fill-in temporary drummers for live performances moving forward. The members saw this as a new beginning for the band, and later even removed all their previous recordings from any sort of retail space, feeling it no longer represented the band.

In 2009, the band released their first album with Hawkins as the lead vocalist, The Few Not Fleeting. Hawkins largely drew from the aforementioned personal issues for lyrical material on the album, and it largely being created by the core trio, the band was able to delve farther into their preferred music stylings, which the band described as more in the progressive rock, alternative rock, and hard rock veins than prior releases. The album recorded in Hawkins' home studio, allowing the band to not be constrained by money or time restraints in the studio, which in turn improved the release's overall sound quality as well. The band toured in support of the album for two years. While Hawkins performed drums on the album, the band recruited a new drummer, Devin Travieso, who toured in support of the album with the band.

=== Mainstream breakthrough with Nothing More (2011–2015) ===
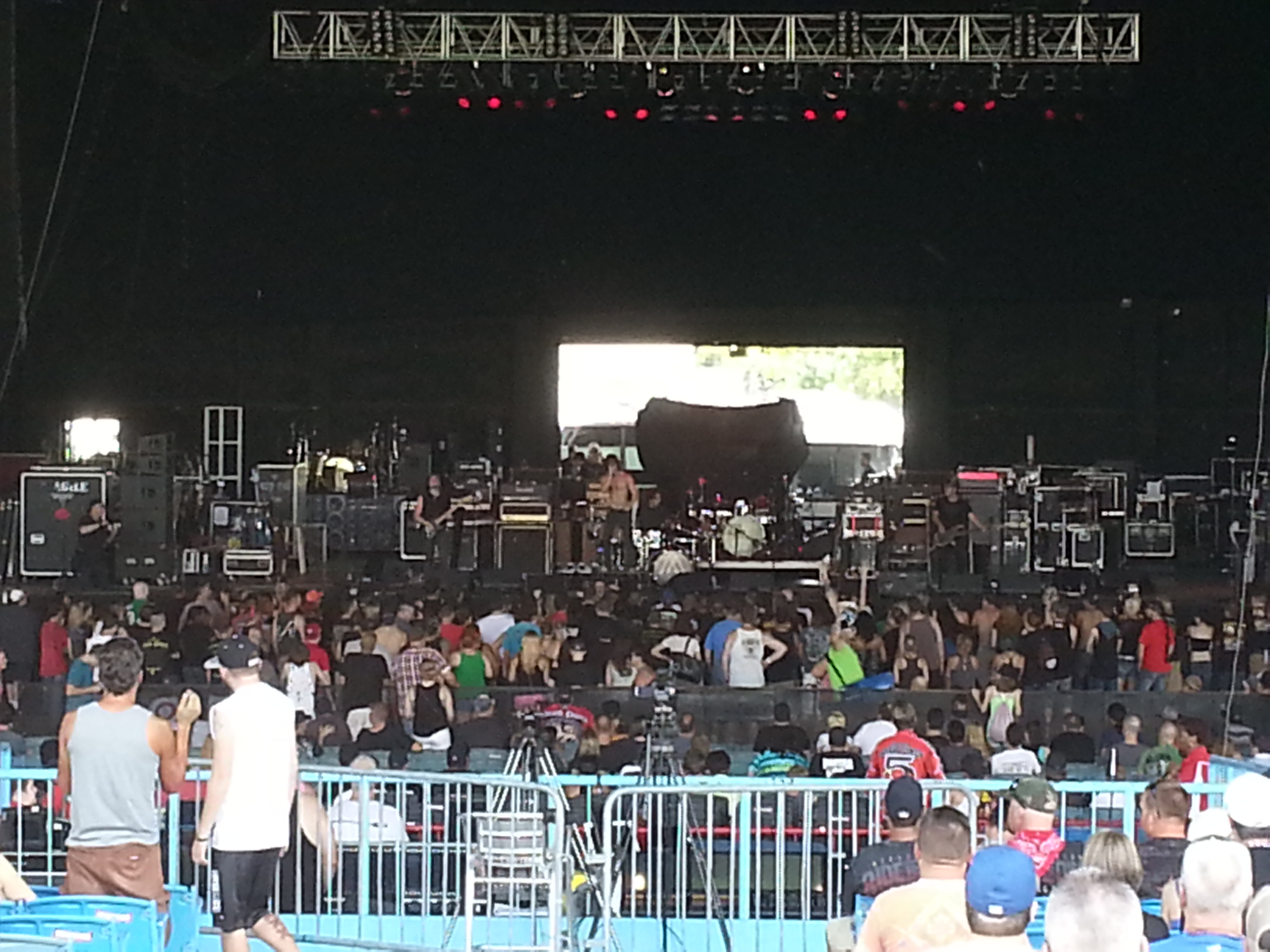
Nothing More performing in 2014

After the two years of touring in support of The Few Not Fleeting, the band turned to working on recording new music in 2011. Still unable to secure a contract from a record label, the band decided to work independently again. Despite this, they set their goal to make a record that sounded as good as a major label release, but on an independent budget. The band recruited new permanent drummer, Paul O'Brien, who reached out to the band after his prior band, Pandemic, broke up. Nothing More members, who were familiar with his work with Pandemic, knew he would be a good fit, and hired him after a successful audition. The four proceeded to move in to a house together and worked on the album for three years, writing about the cumulative five years in between the prior and then upcoming album, where they faced many personal hardships they had lived through during the recording process. Feeling financial hardships during the time, the band raised money through a successful Kickstarter campaign. The band had written 60 song ideas, and spent an entire year filtering through the song ideas into 20 songs, and then down to the 17 found on the album's final track list.

The band finished the album, titled it Nothing More, released it independently in June 2013, and then began touring in support of the album. Their big break occurred in September at the 2013 Aftershock Festival. After a successful show on the first day of the festival, they were asked to come back and perform on the second day, to replace a bigger-named band at one of the show's larger stages. The shows exposed them to a much larger crowd than they usually played - between 10,000 and 13,000 audience members - and after a successful second show, the band finally began getting a number of record label offers. In March 2014, the band decided to sign a contract with Eleven Seven Music, not only ending their long-term search for record label support, but securing a five-album deal. Nothing More was then given a much wider release by the label on June 4, 2014. This time, the album charted, debuting at number 33 on the Billboard 200 and selling 8,600 copies in its opening week.

The band also found much success at rock radio from the releases, with multiple singles charting from the album. The lead single, "This is the Time (Ballast)", hit number 1 on the Mediabase Active Rock chart. It also peaked at number 2 on the Billboard Mainstream Rock chart. Follow-up singles also performed well on the Mainstream Rock chart, including "Mr. MTV", peaking at number 12, "Jenny", peaking at number 6, and "Here's to the Heartache", peaking at number 4. The band toured extensively in support of the album, across North America, Europe, Japan, and Australia. Notably, this included a tour with Chevelle prior to the album's release, an arena tour with Five Finger Death Punch, Hellyeah, and Volbeat in 2014, a tour with Shinedown in 2015, and the Monster Energy Outbreak tour with Marmozets in 2015. However, by September 2015, O'Brien amicably chose to leave the band, with the extensive stadium touring being too stressful for him, causing him depression and anxiety. He was replaced by Ben Anderson, who finished out the 2015 touring and became a permanent member of the band.

=== Mainstream success with The Stories We Tell Ourselves (2016–2021) ===
After extensive touring across 2014 and 2015, the band returned to writing and recording new material in early 2016. By September 2016, the band had 17 fully developed songs, and were contemplating whether or not any songs should be trimmed from the final track listing. The band took a break from recording at this point to tour with Disturbed and Chevelle throughout the end of the year, before returning to complete the recording of the album in early 2017.

In June 2017, the band officially announced the title of their fifth studio album, The Stories We Tell Ourselves, and that it would be released on September 15, 2017. The album debuted at number 15 on the Billboard 200 all-format album chart, selling approximately 20,000 copies in its first week. Prior to the album's release, the band released its first single, "Go to War", and a number of other promotional songs, including "Don't Stop" and "Let 'Em Burn". The band performed at the Alternative Press Music Awards and the Loudwire Music Awards in the latter half of 2017. In November 2017, it was announced that the band was nominated for three Grammy Awards for the 2018 Grammy Awards; "Go to War" being nominated for Best Rock Performance and Best Rock Song, and The Stories We Tell Ourselves for Best Rock Album. In the same month, "Go to War" topped the Billboard Mainstream Rock song chart as well.

The band toured heavily in support of the album in 2018, including a headlining North American tour in February and March, and a North American tour with Papa Roach and Escape the Fate in April and May. Just prior to the 2018 touring, the band released a music video for their second single, "Do You Really Want It?". The CEO of the band's record label mentioned future plans of releasing "Just Say When" as a single as well, which was later done in April 2018; "Let 'Em Burn" later received a formal single release in December. The band continued touring in support of the album into 2019 with a headlining North American tour. The band was the opening act for the band Ghost in the fall of 2019.

=== Spirits and Carnal (2022–present) ===
Planning for a follow-up album started as early as January 2019, with Hawkins that he was working on prepping a new studio to prepare for new album sessions between legs of touring. Hawkins noted it was difficult at times focusing on touring when he had so many thoughts on creating a new album. By October, Vollelunga noted that the band had been creating makeshift recording areas in locker rooms and dressing rooms so they could hold impromptu jam sessions of new material prior to performing their lives shows. He noted that the band would change gears and focus 100% on writing and recording a new album in 2020.The release did not surface in 2021 as work on the album took longer than expected, and in January 2022, the band was revealed to be playing Wisconsin's Rock Fest. This was followed by the announcement of an American co-headlining tour with Asking Alexandria in March which would stretch across May and June, with Atreyu and Eva Under Fire as supporting acts. (Note: Asking Alexandria would not play any of the June dates as planned, as their frontman Danny Worsnop developed a throat infection.)

Two weeks later, they released their first promotional song, "Turn It Up Like (Stand in the Fire)". The first official single, "Tired of Winning", was released in late April, and the band were announced as a special guest on In This Moment's Blood 1983 tour in late June, celebrating the 10-year anniversary of their 2012 album Blood. Three days later, Nothing More's new album title, Spirits, was revealed alongside its title track. Set for release on October 14, another song from the record, "You Don't Know What Love Means", was released in advance of the album in mid-August.

In July 2023, Nothing More dropped off an upcoming tour with Godsmack and Staind after it was publicized that Jonny Hawkins violently ejected his girlfriend out of a truck in December 2021 before running her over, hospitalizing her with a "collapsed lung, broken spinal bones, and severe road rash". Hawkins was initially charged with "hit and run driving causing death or serious injury” and "vehicular negligent injuring" and released on $10,000 bond in March 2022, pleading guilty to the latter. About the domestic incident, the band said "One terrible night does not define a person’s entire life. Jonny has taken responsibility for his actions in his personal life, and he has been held accountable in the eyes of the law."

On January 19, 2024, Nothing More released the single "If It Doesn't Hurt". The song was used prominently by WWE in two video packages for the Women's World Championship match in Night 1 of WrestleMania XL. The band released their seventh album, Carnal, on June 28, 2024.

== Musical style, influences and impact ==
The band has been described as alternative rock, alternative metal, hard rock, progressive rock, progressive metal, and heavy metal. While not directly given the label, their music has been described as having a hardcore and nu metal influence. AllMusic has described the band's overall sound as "somewhere between System of a Down and Incubus", while Team Rock described them as "Hard as fuck crunchy riffs with a slight metal edge all polished up with a fuck-ton of gleaming, radio-friendly production. Imagine if Nine Inch Nails colluded with Royal Blood and Biffy Clyro and you're sort of close." Musically, singer Jonny Hawkins was influenced by the bands Tool and Rage Against the Machine, and the drumming of Dream Theater member Mike Portnoy. In a profile by The Guardian, their musical approach was outlined:

While the post-screamo landscape is awash with frontmen pinning broken hearts to their sleeve tattoos, there's a sophistication to Nothing More's angst that raises them above the tumult-tossed pit. Hawkins' lyrics essay familiar terrain – heartbreak, emotional disaffection – but the likes of 'Do You Really Want It?', with its sober hook 'Everybody wants to change the world / But no one ever wants to change themselves', and lacerating relationship tale "Go to War" skilfully buck the genre's tendency to adolescent self-pity ... Their attack is ferocious – crashing-airliner riffage, dynamics that rephrase EDM's start-stop rhythms and quiet/loud sonics in metallic tones, and even a very "djent" instrumental detour ... But Nothing More leaven the melee with melody, often striking a balance between kinetic thrills and keening pop hooks with the skill of a Linkin Park.

The band's lyrical content has been inspired by a wide variety of factors. Hawkins' personal life has been a large influence; the single "Jenny" is a song that was inspired by his aunt who struggles with schizophrenia, and his sister Jenna, who struggles with bipolar disorder. The band used the song, and respective music video to help raise awareness and money for mental illness. "God Went North" is about the passing of Hawkins' mother. They have found inspiration from a wide variety of influential writers and philosophers as well, from Carl Jung to C.S. Lewis. Hawkins explained that "Films have inspired a lot of our songwriting, obviously through the stories but also through how certain directors communicate emotions through visual media, and I think a lot of philosophers like Alan Watts for instance, who has been a big influence on our lyrics and how we view songwriting altogether which affects how we end up creating all of it." Nothing More has also listed Eckhart Tolle, Stanley Kubrick, Terrence Malick, and Dustin Kensrue as their influences.

Mike Wengren, the drummer of the band Disturbed, cited Nothing More as one of his favorite newer hard rock bands, citing them as one of the examples against the "rock music is dead" argument.

== Live performances ==
The band is known for its elaborate and energetic live performances, with it being likened to "some sort of twisted, rock 'n roll adaptation of Blue Man Group — if Blue Man Group ever opened for Rage Against the Machine." The band has set up two separate drum sets for their live show, one for the band's primary drummer Ben Anderson, and one for Hawkins to join in on intermittently, who had previously been a drummer himself in the early years of the band. The performances also include a number of contraptions created by the bands themselves, including "The Scorpion Tail" in 2016, an animated structure created out of scrap metal and salvaged auto parts, weighing 400 pounds and measuring 14 feet tall. Hawkins rides the structure, while also using it to create digital electronic effects for the songs as well. Its design is based on the "Drumtron"/"Bassinator" contraption the band has used prior, which also allowed the band to perform 3 person bass solos by Hawkins, Vollelunga, and Oliver.

== Members ==
Nothing More live at With Full Force 2018

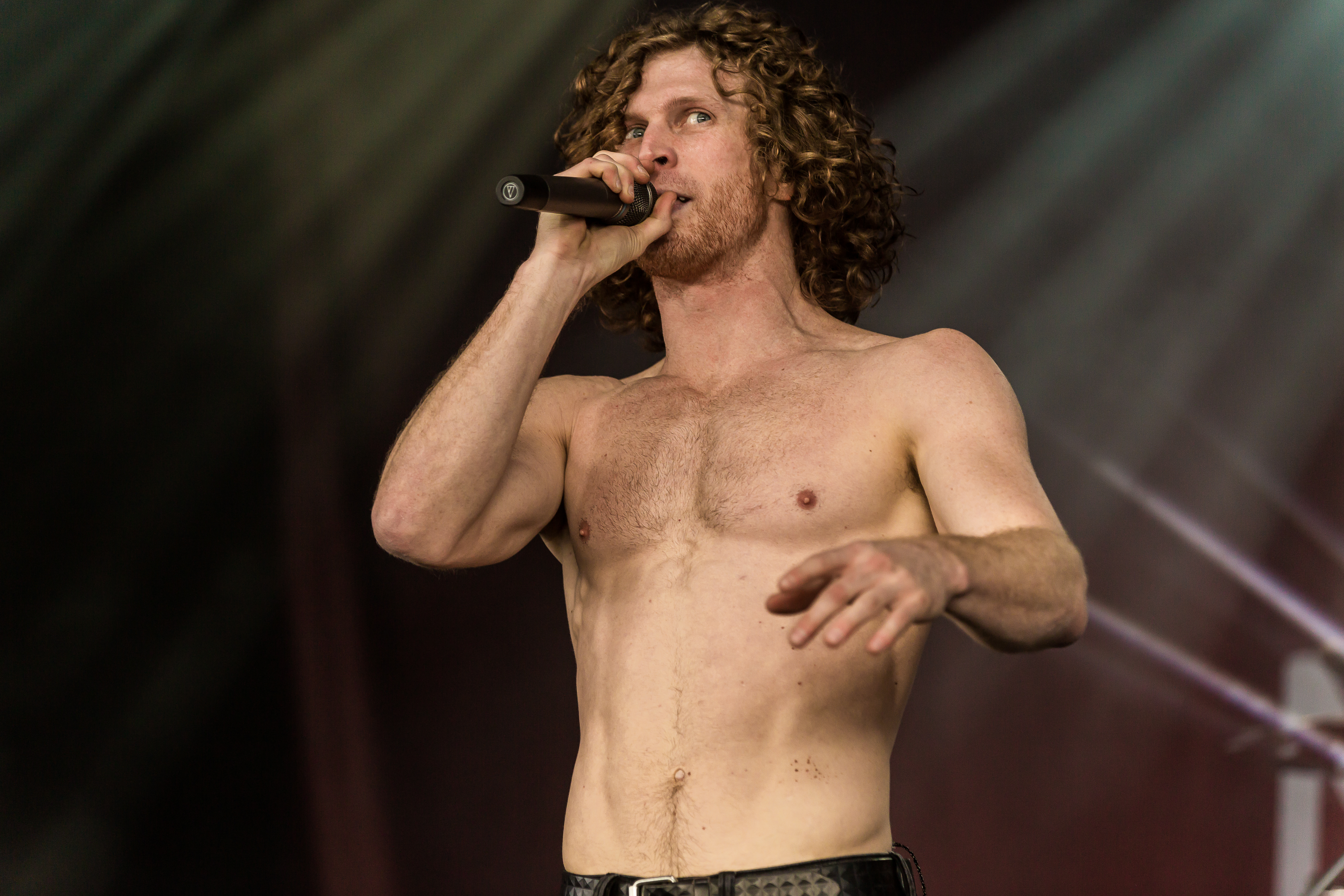
Jonny Hawkins

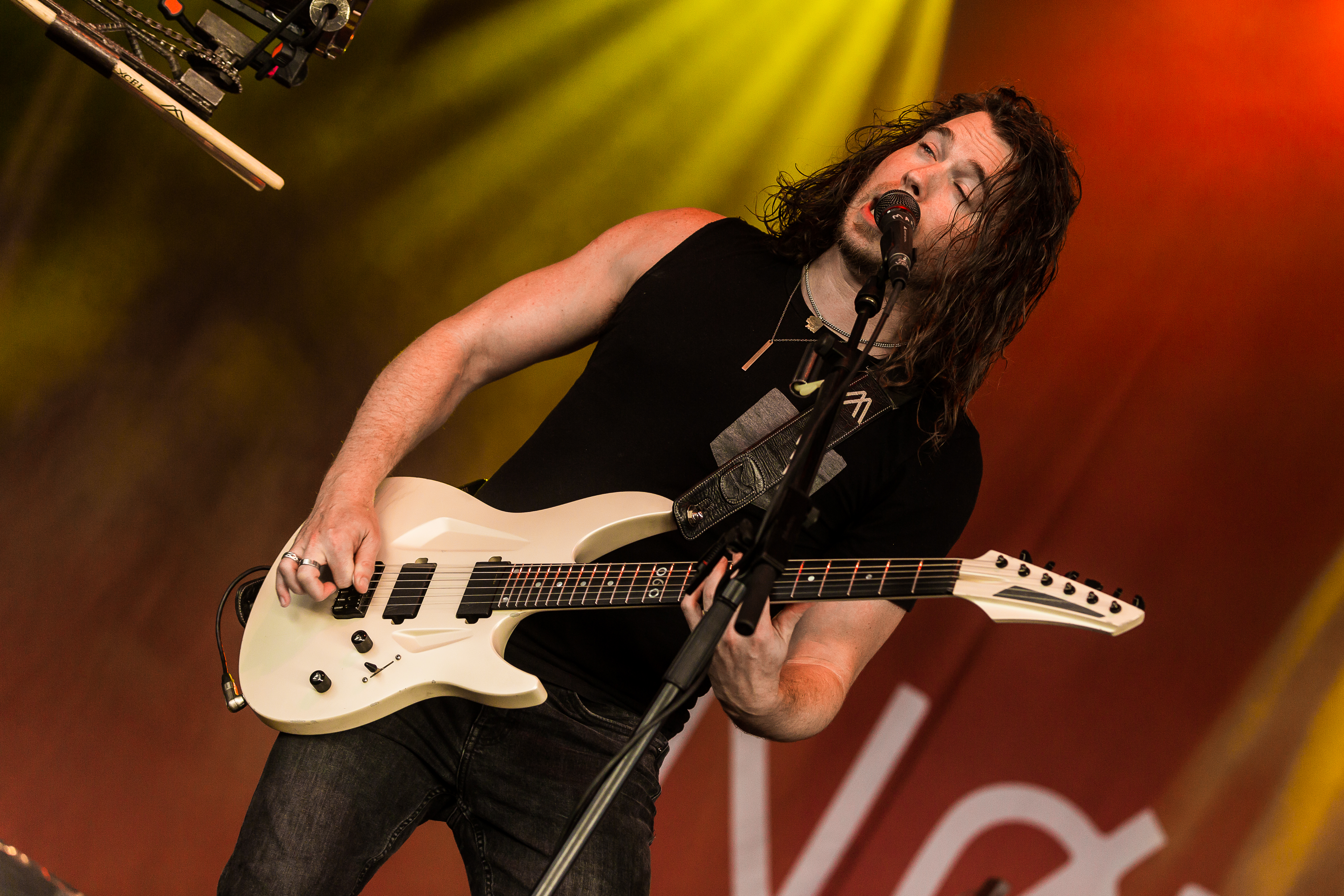
Mark Vollelunga

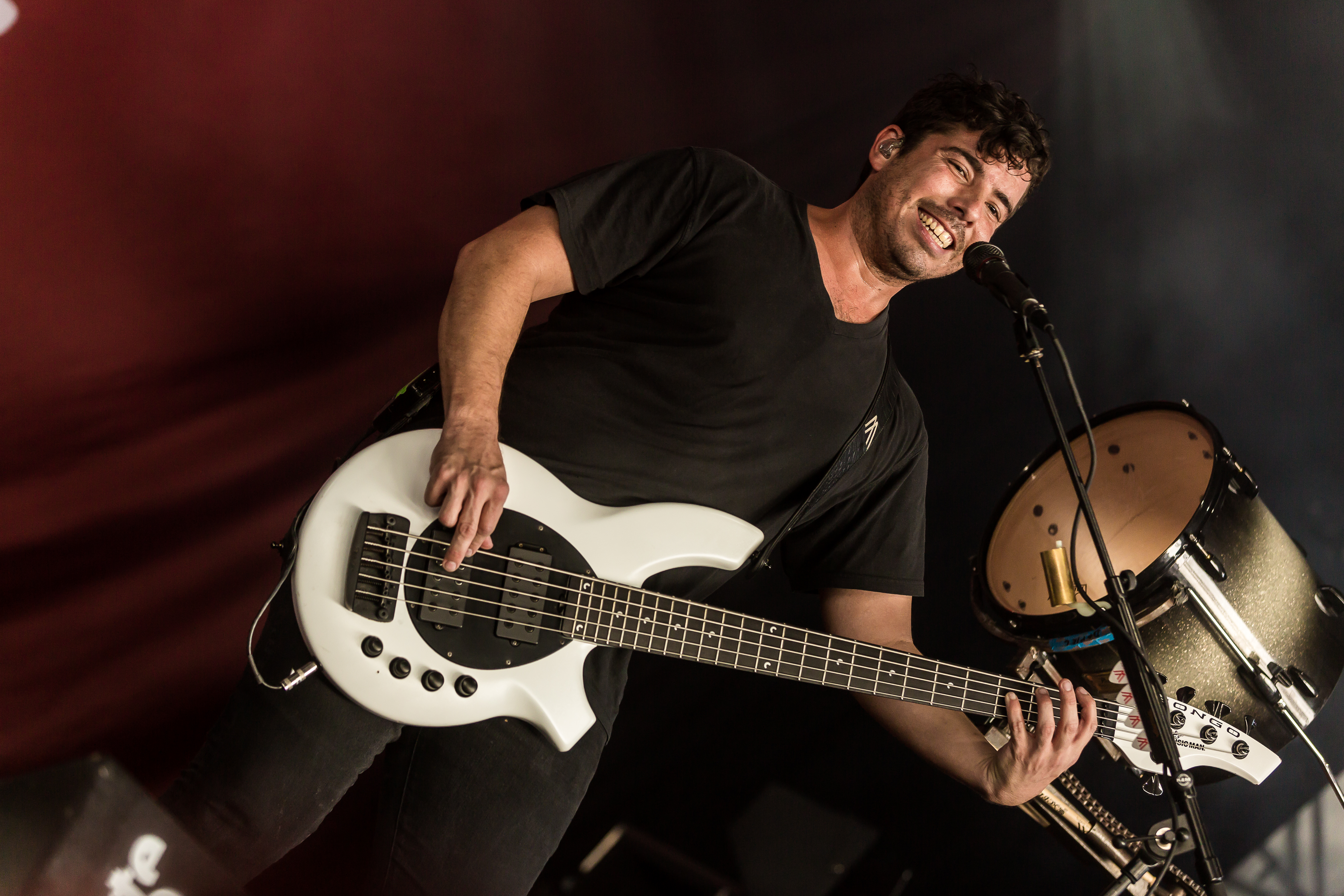
Daniel Oliver

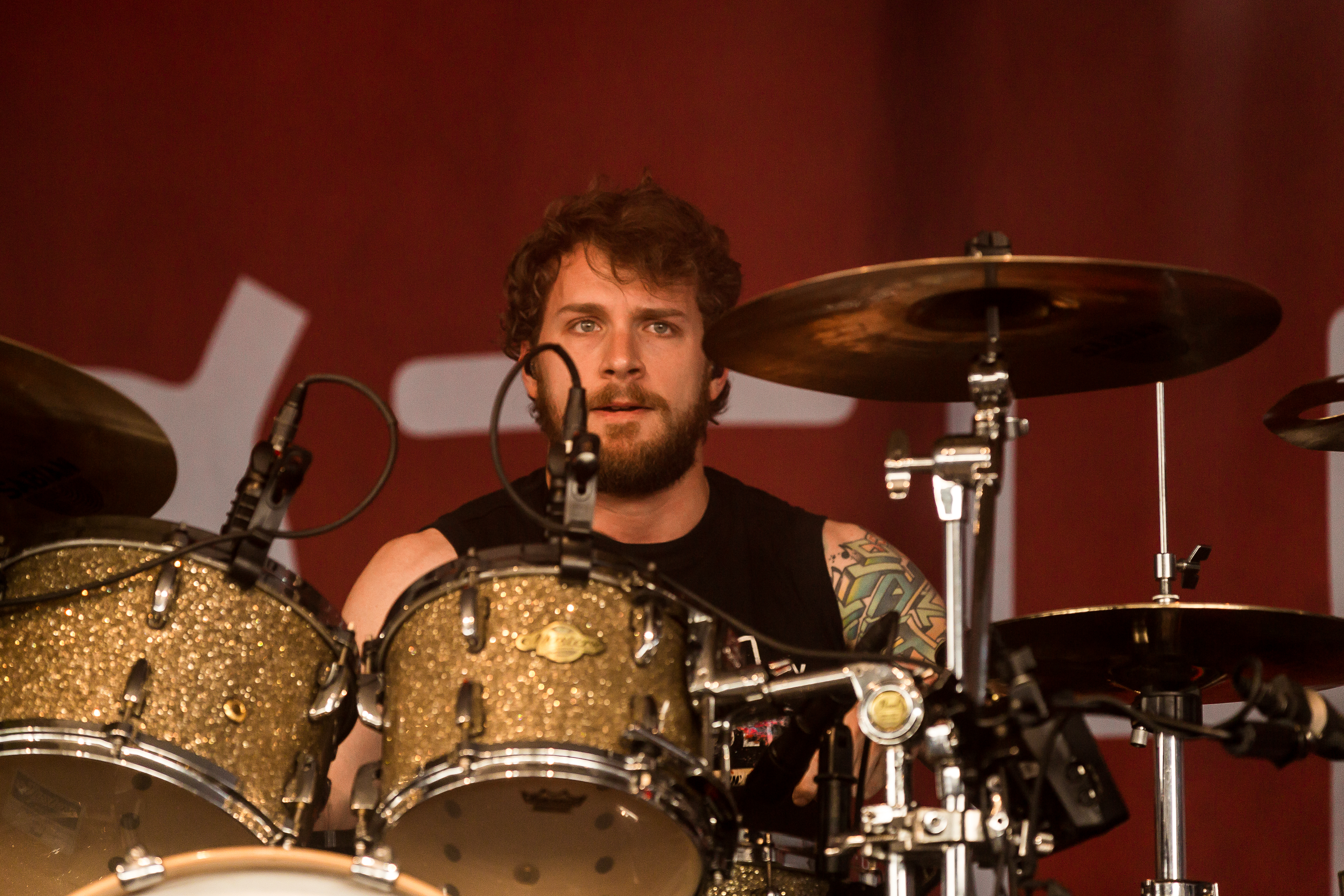
Ben Anderson

Current

- Jonny Hawkins – lead vocals (2008–present), drums (2003–2009)
- Mark Vollelunga – guitars, backing vocals (2003–present)
- Daniel Oliver – bass, backing vocals (2004–present)
- Ben Anderson – drums, percussion (2015–present)

Former

- Josh Klaus – lead vocals (2003–2004)
- Josh Kercheville – guitars (2003–2008)
- Matt Reynolds – bass (2003–2004)
- Travis Cox – lead vocals (2005–2006)
- Trey Graham – lead vocals (2006–2007)
- Devin Travieso – drums (2009–2011)
- Paul O'Brien – drums (2011–2015)

== Awards and nominations ==
Nothing More has been nominated for three Grammy Awards.

- Best Rock Performance - "Go to War"
- Best Rock Song - "Go to War"
- Best Rock Album - The Stories We Tell Ourselves

== Discography ==
- Shelter (2004)
- Save You/Save Me (2007)
- The Few Not Fleeting (2009)
- Nothing More (2014)
- The Stories We Tell Ourselves (2017)
- Spirits (2022)
- Carnal (2024)
