= List of downloadable songs for Rocksmith =

Rocksmith supports a DLC store where users may purchase new songs, in-game pedals, and in-game amplifiers. Bass guitar functionality was added to the North American version of the game via downloadable content on August 14, 2012. All DLC songs are forward-compatible with Rocksmith 2014, but DLC songs released on or after October 22, 2013, are compatible only with Rocksmith 2014 and will not play on the original version of Rocksmith.

As of March 31, 2020, 1,447 additional songs have been made available as DLC, 1,444 of which are available to purchase and download from the Rocksmith store. The three songs no longer available for download for users who don't already own them are those included in the "Holiday 3-Song Pack".

Almost all songs are available to buy individually. Songs by the same artist are often available as "Song Packs", which include three or more songs, for a discounted price.

The final DLC to be released was released in March 2020, as Ubisoft San Francisco transitioned to a new project. As of November 2021, the DLC for the original Rocksmith is slowly getting removed from digital storefronts as the licensing agreements for the songs expire.

Song	Artist(s)	Release year	Tuning	US Pack	EU Pack	US Release Date	EU Release Date
"Bodysnatchers"	Radiohead	2007	Drop D - Lead/Rhythm; E Standard - Bass	Rock Hits 1	—N/a	November 1, 2011	September 28, 2012
"Tighten Up"	The Black Keys	2010	E Standard	Rock Hits 1	—N/a	November 1, 2011	January 8, 2013
"Free Bird"	Lynyrd Skynyrd	1973	E Standard	Rock Hits 1	Classic Rock Pack	November 1, 2011	October 17, 2012
"Smoke on the Water"	Deep Purple	1973	E Standard	Rock Hits 70s	Classic Rock Pack	November 15, 2011	October 17, 2012
"More than a Feeling"	Boston	1976	E Standard	Rock Hits 70s	Classic Rock Pack	November 15, 2011	October 17, 2012
"Jessica"	The Allman Brothers Band	1973	E Standard	The Allman Brothers Band 3-Song Pack		November 15, 2011	November 27, 2012
"Cousins"	Vampire Weekend	2010	E Standard - Lead/Rhythm/Bass; Capo Required - Alt. Bass	Rock Hits 2	Alternative Rock	November 29, 2011	November 13, 2012
"20th Century Boy"	T. Rex	1973	E Standard: A443	Rock Hits 2	—N/a	November 29, 2011	September 28, 2012
"I Hate Everything About You"	Three Days Grace	2004	Drop D	Rock Hits 2	Metal Rock Pack	November 29, 2011	December 11, 2012
"Symphony of Destruction"	Megadeth	1992	E Standard	Megadeth 3-Song Pack		December 13, 2011	September 28, 2012
"Hangar 18"	Megadeth	1990	E Standard - Lead/Alt. Lead/Rhythm; Drop D - Bass	Megadeth 3-Song Pack		December 13, 2011	September 28, 2012
"Public Enemy No. 1"	Megadeth	2011	E Standard - Lead/Rhythm; Drop D - Bass	Megadeth 3-Song Pack		December 13, 2011	December 11, 2012
"Carol of the Bells"	Seth Chapla	2011	E Standard	Holiday 3-Song Pack		December 20, 2011	December 18, 2012
"God Rest Ye Merry, Gentlemen"	Brian Adam McCune	2011	E Standard	Holiday 3-Song Pack		December 20, 2011	December 18, 2012
"We Three Kings"	Versus Them	2011	E Standard	Holiday 3-Song Pack		December 20, 2011	December 18, 2012
"Mind Eraser"	The Black Keys	2011	E Standard	The Black Keys 3-Song Pack		December 27, 2011	November 27, 2012
"Gold on the Ceiling"	The Black Keys	2011	Drop D - Lead; E Standard - Bass	The Black Keys 3-Song Pack		December 27, 2011	November 27, 2012
"Just Got to Be"	The Black Keys	2006	E Standard - Lead; Capo Required - Rhythm	The Black Keys 3-Song Pack		December 27, 2011	November 27, 2012
"(Don't Fear) The Reaper"	Blue Öyster Cult	1976	E Standard	Blue Öyster Cult 3-Song Pack		January 17, 2012	October 17, 2012
"Space Oddity"	David Bowie	1969	E Standard	Rock Hits 60s-70s	—N/a	January 17, 2012	November 27, 2012
"Barracuda"	Heart	1977	E Standard	Rock Hits 60s-70s	Classic Rock Pack	January 17, 2012	October 17, 2012
"Jeremy"	Pearl Jam	1991	E Standard	Pearl Jam 3-Song Pack		February 7, 2012	November 27, 2012
"Black"	Pearl Jam	1991	E Standard	Pearl Jam 3-Song Pack		February 7, 2012	December 18, 2012
"Dammit"	Blink-182	1997	E Standard	Blink-182 3-Song Pack		February 21, 2012	September 28, 2012
"All The Small Things"	Blink-182	2000	E Standard	Blink-182 3-Song Pack		February 21, 2012	September 28, 2012
"What's My Age Again?"	Blink-182	1999	E Standard	Blink-182 3-Song Pack		February 21, 2012	September 28, 2012
"Kryptonite"	3 Doors Down	2000	E Standard	3 Doors Down 3-Song Pack	—N/a	March 6, 2012	September 28, 2012
"Loser"	3 Doors Down	2000	E Standard	3 Doors Down 3-Song Pack	Alternative Pack	March 6, 2012	November 27, 2012
"When I'm Gone"	3 Doors Down	2002	E Standard	3 Doors Down 3-Song Pack	Alternative Pack	March 6, 2012	November 27, 2012
"The Thrill is Gone"	B.B. King	1969	E Standard	Blues Hits	—N/a	March 20, 2012	September 28, 2012
"Born Under a Bad Sign"	Albert King with Stevie Ray Vaughan	1983	E Standard	Blues Hits	—N/a	March 20, 2012	October 17, 2012
"Soul Man"	The Blues Brothers	1978	E Standard	Blues Hits	Classic Rock Pack	March 20, 2012	October 17, 2012
"Bring Me to Life"	Evanescence	2003	E Standard	Rock Hits 3	Metal Rock Pack	April 3, 2012	December 11, 2012
"Pumped Up Kicks"	Foster the People	2011	E Standard - Lead/Rhythm/Bass; Capo Required - Alt. Lead	Rock Hits 3	—N/a	April 3, 2012	September 28, 2012
"This Love"	Maroon 5	2002	E Standard	Rock Hits 3	—N/a	April 3, 2012	October 17, 2012
"Breaking the Law"	Judas Priest	1980	E Standard	Judas Priest 3-Song Pack		April 17, 2012	December 11, 2012
"Living After Midnight"	Judas Priest	1980	E Standard	Judas Priest 3-Song Pack		April 17, 2012	December 11, 2012
"Painkiller"	Judas Priest	1990	E Standard	Judas Priest 3-Song Pack		April 17, 2012	December 11, 2012
"Roxanne"	The Police	1978	E Standard	The Police 3-Song Pack		May 1, 2012	October 17, 2012
"Message in a Bottle"	The Police	1979	E Standard	The Police 3-Song Pack		May 1, 2012	October 17, 2012
"Synchronicity II"	The Police	1983	E Standard	The Police 3-Song Pack		May 1, 2012	October 17, 2012
"Gone Away"	The Offspring	1997	E Standard	The Offspring 3-Song Pack		May 15, 2012	November 27, 2012
"Come Out and Play (Keep 'Em Separated)"	The Offspring	1994	E Standard	The Offspring 3-Song Pack		May 15, 2012	November 27, 2012
"Self Esteem"	The Offspring	1994	E Standard	The Offspring 3-Song Pack		May 15, 2012	November 27, 2012
"Planetary (GO!)"	My Chemical Romance	2011	E Standard	My Chemical Romance 3-Song Pack		May 29, 2012	October 17, 2012
"Welcome to the Black Parade"	My Chemical Romance	2006	E Standard	My Chemical Romance 3-Song Pack		May 29, 2012	October 17, 2012
"Na Na Na (Na Na Na Na Na Na Na Na Na)"	My Chemical Romance	2010	E Standard	My Chemical Romance 3-Song Pack		May 29, 2012	October 17, 2012
"Keep Yourself Alive"	Queen	1973	E Standard	Queen 5-Song Pack		June 12, 2012	October 17, 2012
"Bohemian Rhapsody"	Queen	1975	E Standard	Queen 5-Song Pack		June 12, 2012	October 17, 2012
"Fat Bottomed Girls"	Queen	1978	Drop D - Lead/Bass; Drop D: A445 - Alt. Lead	Queen 5-Song Pack		June 12, 2012	October 17, 2012
"Killer Queen"	Queen	1974	E Standard	Queen 5-Song Pack		June 12, 2012	October 17, 2012
"Stone Cold Crazy"	Queen	1974	E Standard	Queen 5-Song Pack		June 12, 2012	October 17, 2012
"Godzilla"	Blue Öyster Cult	1977	E Standard	Blue Öyster Cult 3-Song Pack		June 26, 2012	October 17, 2012
"My Sharona"	The Knack	1979	E Standard	Rock Hits 4	—N/a	June 26, 2012	October 17, 2012
"Hit Me with Your Best Shot"	Pat Benatar	1980	E Standard	Rock Hits 4	—N/a	June 26, 2012	September 28, 2012
"Redneck"	Lamb of God	2006	Drop D	Rock Hits 5	2000 Rock Hits 01	July 10, 2012	December 11, 2012
"I Believe in a Thing Called Love"	The Darkness	2003	E Standard	Rock Hits 5	2000 Rock Hits 01	July 10, 2012	October 17, 2012
"Paralyzer"	Finger Eleven	2006	E Standard	Rock Hits 5	2000 Rock Hits 01	July 10, 2012	October 17, 2012
"My Girl"	The Temptations	1964	E Standard	Soul Hits	—N/a	July 24, 2012	October 17, 2012
"(Sittin' On) The Dock of the Bay"	Otis Redding	1967	E Standard	Soul Hits	Classic Rock Pack	July 24, 2012	October 17, 2012
"What's Going On"	Marvin Gaye	1971	E Standard	Soul Hits	—N/a	July 24, 2012	October 17, 2012
"Born on the Bayou"	Creedence Clearwater Revival	1969	E Standard	Rock Hits 60s	—N/a	August 21, 2012	December 18, 2012
"In-A-Gadda-Da-Vida"	Iron Butterfly	1968	E Standard	Rock Hits 60s	—N/a	August 21, 2012	January 8, 2013
"Whipping Post"	The Allman Brothers Band	1969	E Standard	The Allman Brothers Band 3-Song Pack		August 21, 2012	January 8, 2013
"Mississippi Queen"	Mountain	1970	E Standard	Rock Hits 70s 2	—N/a	September 4, 2012	November 27, 2012
"Drift Away"	Dobie Gray	1972	E Standard	Rock Hits 70s 2	—N/a	September 4, 2012	November 27, 2012
"The Man Who Sold the World"	David Bowie	1970	E Standard	Rock Hits 70s 2	—N/a	September 4, 2012	November 27, 2012
"We're Not Gonna Take It"	Twisted Sister	1984	E Standard	Rock Hits 80s	—N/a	September 18, 2012	November 27, 2012
"The Final Countdown"	Europe	1986	E Standard	Rock Hits 80s	—N/a	September 18, 2012	November 27, 2012
"Is This Love"	Whitesnake	1987	E Standard	Rock Hits 80s	—N/a	September 18, 2012	November 27, 2012
"Caring Is Creepy"	The Shins	2001	E Standard	Indie Rock Hits	—N/a	October 2, 2012	October 3, 2012
"Bright Lights"	Gary Clark Jr.	2010	E Standard	Indie Rock Hits	—N/a	October 2, 2012	October 3, 2012
"Paris (Ooh La La)"	Grace Potter and the Nocturnals	2010	E Standard	Indie Rock Hits	—N/a	October 2, 2012	October 3, 2012
"Beast and the Harlot"	Avenged Sevenfold	2005	Drop D	Avenged Sevenfold 3-Song Pack	Metal Rock Pack	October 30, 2012	
"Afterlife"	Avenged Sevenfold	2007	Drop D	Avenged Sevenfold 3-Song Pack	Metal Rock Pack	October 30, 2012	
"Nightmare"	Avenged Sevenfold	2010	Drop D	Avenged Sevenfold 3-Song Pack	Metal Rock Pack	October 30, 2012	
"Limelight"	Rush	1981	E Standard	Rush 5-Song Pack		November 13, 2012	
"Red Barchetta"	Rush	1981	E Standard	Rush 5-Song Pack		November 13, 2012	
"Tom Sawyer"	Rush	1981	E Standard	Rush 5-Song Pack		November 13, 2012	
"YYZ"	Rush	1981	E Standard	Rush 5-Song Pack		November 13, 2012	
"Subdivisions"	Rush	1982	E Standard	Rush 5-Song Pack		November 13, 2012	
"Headlong Flight"	Rush	2012	E Standard	—N/a	—N/a	November 13, 2012	
"Give Up the Funk (Tear the Roof off the Sucker)"	Parliament	1976	E Standard	Funk Hits	—N/a	November 27, 2012	
"Good Times"	Chic	1979	E Standard	Funk Hits	—N/a	November 27, 2012	
"Super Freak"	Rick James	1981	E Standard	Funk Hits	—N/a	November 27, 2012	
"Cowboys from Hell"	Pantera	1990	E Standard	Pantera 3-Song Pack		December 4, 2012	
"Domination"	Pantera	1990	E Standard	Pantera 3-Song Pack		December 4, 2012	
"Walk"	Pantera	1992	Drop D	Pantera 3-Song Pack		December 4, 2012	
"How You Remind Me"	Nickelback	2001	Drop D	Nickelback 3-Song Pack		December 11, 2012	
"Rockstar"	Nickelback	2006	E Standard	Nickelback 3-Song Pack		December 11, 2012	
"Bottoms Up"	Nickelback	2011	Drop D	Nickelback 3-Song Pack		December 11, 2012	
"Best of You"	Foo Fighters	2005	E Standard	Foo Fighters 5-Song Pack		December 18, 2012	
"My Hero"	Foo Fighters	1998	E Standard	Foo Fighters 5-Song Pack		December 18, 2012	
"Times Like These"	Foo Fighters	2003	E Standard	Foo Fighters 5-Song Pack		December 18, 2012	
"Walk"	Foo Fighters	2011	E Standard	Foo Fighters 5-Song Pack		December 18, 2012	
"Wheels"	Foo Fighters	2009	E Standard	Foo Fighters 5-Song Pack		December 18, 2012	
"Black Magic Woman/Gypsy Queen"	Santana	1970	E Standard	Santana 3-Song Pack		January 8, 2013	
"Oye Como Va"	Santana	1970	E Standard	Santana 3-Song Pack		January 8, 2013	
"Smooth"	Santana feat. Rob Thomas	1999	E Standard	Santana 3-Song Pack		January 8, 2013	
"Cliffs of Dover"	Eric Johnson	1990	E Standard	Rock Hits 90s		January 15, 2013	
"No Rain"	Blind Melon	1992	E Standard	Rock Hits 90s		January 15, 2013	
"Alive"	Pearl Jam	1991	E Standard	Pearl Jam 3-Song Pack		January 15, 2013	
"Juicebox"	The Strokes	2006	E Standard	The Strokes 3-Song Pack		January 22, 2013	
"Last Nite"	The Strokes	2001	E Standard	The Strokes 3-Song Pack		January 22, 2013	
"Reptilia"	The Strokes	2003	E Standard	The Strokes 3-Song Pack		January 22, 2013	
"American Woman"	The Guess Who	1970	E Standard	Rock Hits 60s-70s 2		January 29, 2013	
"Born to Be Wild"	Steppenwolf	1968	E Standard	Rock Hits 60s-70s 2		January 29, 2013	
"Surrender"	Cheap Trick	1978	E Standard	Rock Hits 60s-70s 2		January 29, 2013	
"America's Suitehearts"	Fall Out Boy	2008	Drop D	Fall Out Boy 5-Song Pack		February 5, 2013	
"Dance, Dance"	Fall Out Boy	2005	E Standard	Fall Out Boy 5-Song Pack		February 5, 2013	
"I Don't Care"	Fall Out Boy	2008	E Standard	Fall Out Boy 5-Song Pack		February 5, 2013	
"Sugar, We're Goin Down"	Fall Out Boy	2005	Drop D	Fall Out Boy 5-Song Pack		February 5, 2013	
"Thnks fr th Mmrs"	Fall Out Boy	2007	Drop D	Fall Out Boy 5-Song Pack		February 5, 2013	
"London Calling"	The Clash	1979	E Standard	The Clash 3-Song Pack		February 12, 2013	
"Guns of Brixton"	The Clash	1979	E Standard	The Clash 3-Song Pack		February 12, 2013	
"Should I Stay or Should I Go"	The Clash	1982	E Standard	The Clash 3-Song Pack		February 12, 2013	
"Black Betty"	Ram Jam	1977	E Standard	Rock Hits 70s-80s		February 19, 2013	
"Carry On Wayward Son"	Kansas	1976	E Standard	Rock Hits 70s-80s		February 19, 2013	
"You've Got Another Thing Comin'"	Judas Priest	1982	E Standard	Rock Hits 70s-80s		February 19, 2013	
"Wish You Were Here"	Incubus	2001	E Standard	Incubus 3-Song Pack		February 26, 2013	
"Anna Molly"	Incubus	2006	E Standard	Incubus 3-Song Pack		February 26, 2013	
"Love Hurts"	Incubus	2008	E Standard	Incubus 3-Song Pack		February 26, 2013	
"Burnin' For You"	Blue Öyster Cult	1981	E Standard	Blue Öyster Cult 3-Song Pack		March 5, 2013	
"Blister in the Sun"	Violent Femmes	1983	E Standard	Rock Hits 80s 2		March 5, 2013	
"Cult of Personality"	Living Colour	1988	E Standard	Rock Hits 80s 2		March 5, 2013	
"Lovesong"	The Cure	1989	E Standard	The Cure 3-Song Pack		March 19, 2013	
"Just Like Heaven"	The Cure	1987	E Standard	The Cure 3-Song Pack		March 19, 2013	
"The End of the World"	The Cure	2004	E Standard: A445 - Lead/Rhythm; Drop D: A445 - Bass	The Cure 3-Song Pack		March 19, 2013	
"Have You Ever Seen the Rain?"	Creedence Clearwater Revival	1970	E Standard	Rock Hits 70s 2		April 2, 2013	
"Southbound"	The Allman Brothers Band	1973	E Standard	The Allman Brothers Band 3-Song Pack		April 2, 2013	
"Ballroom Blitz"	Sweet	1973	E Standard	Rock Hits 70s 2		April 2, 2013	
"Get Free"	The Vines	2002	E Standard	Rock Hits 00s		April 16, 2013	
"The Good Left Undone"	Rise Against	2007	E♭ Standard	Rock Hits 00s		April 16, 2013	
"Float On"	Modest Mouse	2004	E Standard	Rock Hits 00s		April 16, 2013	
"White Wedding"	Billy Idol	1982	E Standard	Rock Hits 80s 3		April 30, 2013	
"Eye of the Tiger"	Survivor	1982	E Standard	Rock Hits 80s 3		April 30, 2013	
"Here Comes Your Man"	Pixies	1989	E Standard	Rock Hits 80s 3		April 30, 2013	
"Misery"	Maroon 5	2010	E Standard	Maroon 5 3-Song Pack		May 14, 2013	
"Harder to Breathe"	Maroon 5	2002	E Standard	Maroon 5 3-Song Pack		May 14, 2013	
"She Will Be Loved"	Maroon 5	2002	E Standard - Lead/Alt.Lead; Drop D - Bass	Maroon 5 3-Song Pack		May 14, 2013	
"Call Me"	Blondie	1980	E Standard	Rock Hits 80s 4		May 28, 2013	
"867-5309/Jenny"	Tommy Tutone	1982	E Standard	Rock Hits 80s 4		May 28, 2013	
"Jessie's Girl"	Rick Springfield	1981	E Standard	Rock Hits 80s 4		May 28, 2013	
"25 or 6 to 4"	Chicago	1970	E Standard	—N/a		October 22, 2013	
"The Sky Is Crying"	Albert King	1969	E Standard	—N/a		October 22, 2013	
"Cherub Rock"	The Smashing Pumpkins	1993	E Standard	—N/a		October 22, 2013	
"Elephant"	Tame Impala	2012	D Standard	—N/a		October 22, 2013	
"Mind Eraser, No Chaser"	Them Crooked Vultures	2009	E Standard	—N/a		October 22, 2013	
"Hate to Say I Told You So"	The Hives	2000	E Standard	—N/a		October 22, 2013	
"My God Is the Sun"	Queens of the Stone Age	2013	E Standard	—N/a		October 22, 2013	
"Ho Hey"	The Lumineers	2012	E Standard	—N/a		October 22, 2013	
"1979"	The Smashing Pumpkins	1996	E♭ Standard	The Smashing Pumpkins 5-Song Pack		October 29, 2013	
"Tonight, Tonight"	The Smashing Pumpkins	1996	E♭ Standard	The Smashing Pumpkins 5-Song Pack		October 29, 2013	
"Today"	The Smashing Pumpkins	1993	E Standard	The Smashing Pumpkins 5-Song Pack		October 29, 2013	
"Disarm"	The Smashing Pumpkins	1994	E Standard	The Smashing Pumpkins 5-Song Pack		October 29, 2013	
"Bullet with Butterfly Wings"	The Smashing Pumpkins	1995	E♭ Standard	The Smashing Pumpkins 5-Song Pack		October 29, 2013	
"Aces High"	Iron Maiden	1984	E Standard	Iron Maiden 5-Song Pack		November 5, 2013	
"2 Minutes to Midnight"	Iron Maiden	1984	E Standard	Iron Maiden 5-Song Pack		November 5, 2013	
"Fear of the Dark"	Iron Maiden	1993	E Standard	Iron Maiden 5-Song Pack		November 5, 2013	
"The Number of the Beast"	Iron Maiden	1982	E Standard	Iron Maiden 5-Song Pack		November 5, 2013	
"Run to the Hills"	Iron Maiden	1982	E Standard	Iron Maiden 5-Song Pack		November 5, 2013	
"Thrill"	Hotei	1995	E Standard	Hotei 3-Song Pack		November 5, 2013	
"Battle Without Honor or Humanity"	Hotei	2003	E Standard	Hotei 3-Song Pack		November 5, 2013	
"Bambina"	Hotei	1999	E Standard	Hotei 3-Song Pack		November 5, 2013	
"Check My Brain"	Alice in Chains	2009	E♭ Standard - Lead/Rhythm; E♭ Drop D♭ - Bass	Alice in Chains 5-Song Pack		November 12, 2013	
"Hollow"	Alice in Chains	2012	E♭ Drop D♭	Alice in Chains 5-Song Pack		November 12, 2013	
"Man in the Box"	Alice in Chains	1991	E♭ Standard	Alice in Chains 5-Song Pack		November 12, 2013	
"Them Bones"	Alice in Chains	1992	E♭ Drop D♭	Alice in Chains 5-Song Pack		November 12, 2013	
"Would?"	Alice in Chains	1992	E♭ Standard	Alice in Chains 5-Song Pack		November 12, 2013	
"American Idiot"	Green Day	2004	E Standard	Green Day 3-Song Pack		November 19, 2013	
"Basket Case"	Green Day	1994	E♭ Standard	Green Day 3-Song Pack		November 19, 2013	
"Oh Love"	Green Day	2012	E Standard	Green Day 3-Song Pack		November 19, 2013	
"Easy Come, Easy Go!"	B'z	1990	E Standard - Lead/Rhythm; Drop D - Bass	B'z 3-Song Pack		November 19, 2013	
"Giri Giri chop"	B'z	1999	E Standard	B'z 3-Song Pack		November 19, 2013	
"juice"	B'z	2000	E Standard	B'z 3-Song Pack		November 19, 2013	
"My Iron Lung"	Radiohead	1994	EGDGBD - Lead/Rhythm; E Standard - Bass	Radiohead 5-Song Pack		November 26, 2013	
"Creep"	Radiohead	1992	E Standard	Radiohead 5-Song Pack		November 26, 2013	
"Karma Police"	Radiohead	1997	E Standard	Radiohead 5-Song Pack		November 26, 2013	
"Optimistic"	Radiohead	2000	DADFCd - Lead; Drop D - Rhythm/Bass	Radiohead 5-Song Pack		November 26, 2013	
"Just"	Radiohead	1995	E Standard	Radiohead 5-Song Pack		November 26, 2013	
"Baba O'Riley"	The Who	1971	E Standard: A454	The Who 5-Song Pack		December 3, 2013	
"Behind Blue Eyes"	The Who	1971	E Standard: A447	The Who 5-Song Pack		December 3, 2013	
"Who Are You"	The Who	1978	E Standard	The Who 5-Song Pack		December 3, 2013	
"Pinball Wizard"	The Who	1969	E Standard	The Who 5-Song Pack		December 3, 2013	
"The Seeker"	The Who	1970	E Standard	The Who 5-Song Pack		December 3, 2013	
"Liar"	One Ok Rock	2010	E♭ Drop D♭	—N/a		December 3, 2013	
"NO SCARED"	One Ok Rock	2011	E♭ Drop D♭	—N/a		December 3, 2013	
"Yasashiku Naritai"	Kazuyoshi Saito	2011	E♭ Drop D♭ - Lead/Rhythm; E Standard - Bass	—N/a		December 3, 2013	
"Down with the Sickness"	Disturbed	1999	E♭ Drop D♭	Disturbed 3-Song Pack		December 10, 2013	
"Voices"	Disturbed	2000	E♭ Drop D♭	Disturbed 3-Song Pack		December 10, 2013	
"Asylum"	Disturbed	2010	E♭ Standard	Disturbed 3-Song Pack		December 10, 2013	
"Hysteria"	Muse	2003	E Standard	Muse 5-Song Pack		December 17, 2013	
"Time Is Running Out"	Muse	2003	E Standard	Muse 5-Song Pack		December 17, 2013	
"Supermassive Black Hole"	Muse	2006	E Standard	Muse 5-Song Pack		December 17, 2013	
"Stockholm Syndrome"	Muse	2003	Drop D	Muse 5-Song Pack		December 17, 2013	
"Muscle Museum"	Muse	1999	E Standard	Muse 5-Song Pack		December 17, 2013	
"Memeshikute"	Golden Bomber	2009	E Standard - Lead/Rhythm; Bass - C# Standard	Golden Bomber 3-Song Pack		December 17, 2013	
"Earphone"	Golden Bomber	2012	E♭ Standard	Golden Bomber 3-Song Pack		December 17, 2013	
"Death Mental"	Golden Bomber	2012	E Standard	Golden Bomber 3-Song Pack		December 17, 2013	
"Same Old Song and Dance"	Aerosmith	1974	E Standard	Aerosmith 5-Song Pack		January 7, 2014	
"Sweet Emotion"	Aerosmith	1975	E Standard	Aerosmith 5-Song Pack		January 7, 2014	
"Legendary Child"	Aerosmith	2012	E Standard	Aerosmith 5-Song Pack		January 7, 2014	
"Dream On"	Aerosmith	1973	E Standard: A444	Aerosmith 5-Song Pack		January 7, 2014	
"Oh Yeah"	Aerosmith	2012	E Standard	Aerosmith 5-Song Pack		January 7, 2014	
"Live Forever"	Oasis	1994	E Standard: A449	Oasis 5-Song Pack		January 14, 2014	
"Supersonic"	Oasis	1994	E Standard	Oasis 5-Song Pack		January 14, 2014	
"Champagne Supernova"	Oasis	1995	E Standard: A443	Oasis 5-Song Pack		January 14, 2014	
"Some Might Say"	Oasis	1995	E Standard: A450	Oasis 5-Song Pack		January 14, 2014	
"Wonderwall"	Oasis	1995	Capo Required - Lead/Rhythm; E Standard - Bass	Oasis 5-Song Pack		January 14, 2014	
"Atarashii Hikari"	9mm Parabellum Bullet	2011	Drop D	—N/a		January 14, 2014	
"Punishment"	9mm Parabellum Bullet	2007	E Standard - Lead/Rhythm; Drop D - Bass	—N/a		January 14, 2014	
"Buddy Holly"	Weezer	1994	E♭ Standard	Weezer 5-Song Pack		January 21, 2014	
"My Name Is Jonas"	Weezer	1994	E♭ Standard	Weezer 5-Song Pack		January 21, 2014	
"Island in the Sun"	Weezer	2001	E Standard	Weezer 5-Song Pack		January 21, 2014	
"Undone (The Sweater Song)"	Weezer	1994	E♭ Standard	Weezer 5-Song Pack		January 21, 2014	
"Hash Pipe"	Weezer	2001	E Standard	Weezer 5-Song Pack		January 21, 2014	
"Aerials"	System of a Down	2002	D Drop C	System of a Down 3-Song Pack		January 28, 2014	
"B.Y.O.B."	System of a Down	2004	E♭ Drop D♭	System of a Down 3-Song Pack		January 28, 2014	
"Toxicity"	System of a Down	2002	D Drop C	System of a Down 3-Song Pack		January 28, 2014	
"From Noon Till Dawn"	Straightener	2012	E♭ Standard	—N/a		February 4, 2014	
"ROCKSTEADY"	Straightener	2002	E♭ Standard	—N/a		February 4, 2014	
"Everybody Hurts"	R.E.M.	1992	E Standard	R.E.M. 5-Song Pack		February 4, 2014	
"Shiny Happy People"	R.E.M.	1991	E Standard	R.E.M. 5-Song Pack		February 4, 2014	
"The One I Love"	R.E.M.	1987	E Standard	R.E.M. 5-Song Pack		February 4, 2014	
"What's the Frequency, Kenneth?"	R.E.M.	1994	E Standard	R.E.M. 5-Song Pack		February 4, 2014	
"Überlin"	R.E.M.	2011	D Standard	R.E.M. 5-Song Pack		February 4, 2014	
"Detroit Rock City"	Kiss	1976	E♭ Standard	Kiss 3-Song Pack		February 11, 2014	
"Heaven's On Fire"	Kiss	1984	E Standard: A431	Kiss 3-Song Pack		February 11, 2014	
"I Was Made for Lovin' You"	Kiss	1979	E Standard	Kiss 3-Song Pack		February 11, 2014	
"Shinsekai"	ACIDMAN	2013	E Standard	—N/a		February 18, 2014	
"stupid"	The Birthday	2006	E♭ Standard	—N/a		February 18, 2014	
"PARADOX Taiso"	RIZE	2008	E♭ Standard	—N/a		February 18, 2014	
"Give It All"	Rise Against	2004	E♭ Standard	Rise Against 5-Song Pack		February 18, 2014	
"Swing Life Away"	Rise Against	2004	E♭ Standard	Rise Against 5-Song Pack		February 18, 2014	
"Make It Stop"	Rise Against	2011	E♭ Standard	Rise Against 5-Song Pack		February 18, 2014	
"Satellite"	Rise Against	2011	E♭ Standard	Rise Against 5-Song Pack		February 18, 2014	
"Prayer of the Refugee"	Rise Against	2006	E♭ Standard	Rise Against 5-Song Pack		February 18, 2014	
"Light My Fire"	The Doors	1967	E Standard: A425	The Doors 3-Song Pack		February 25, 2014	
"Riders on the Storm"	The Doors	1971	E Standard	The Doors 3-Song Pack		February 25, 2014	
"Roadhouse Blues"	The Doors	1970	E Standard	The Doors 3-Song Pack		February 25, 2014	
"Don't Look Back"	Boston	1978	E Standard	Boston 3-Song Pack		March 4, 2014	
"Foreplay/Long Time"	Boston	1976	E Standard	Boston 3-Song Pack		March 4, 2014	
"Hitch a Ride"	Boston	1976	E Standard	Boston 3-Song Pack		March 4, 2014	
"Crazy on You"	Heart	1976	E Standard	Female Lead Singles		March 11, 2014	
"Love Bites (So Do I)"	Halestorm	2012	Drop D	Female Lead Singles		March 11, 2014	
"All Around Me"	Flyleaf	2005	Drop D	Female Lead Singles		March 11, 2014	
"It's Complicated"	A Day to Remember	2010	Drop D♭	A Day to Remember 5-Song Pack		March 18, 2014	
"If It Means a Lot to You"	A Day to Remember	2009	D Standard - Lead/Rhythm; D Drop C [Bass]	A Day to Remember 5-Song Pack		March 18, 2014	
"All I Want"	A Day to Remember	2010	D Drop C	A Day to Remember 5-Song Pack		March 18, 2014	
"The Downfall of Us All"	A Day to Remember	2009	D Drop C	A Day to Remember 5-Song Pack		March 18, 2014	
"All Signs Point to Lauderdale"	A Day to Remember	2010	D Drop C	A Day to Remember 5-Song Pack		March 18, 2014	
"Unwell"	Matchbox Twenty	2002	E Standard - Lead/Rhythm; Drop D [Bass]	Matchbox Twenty 5-Song Pack		March 25, 2014	
"She's So Mean"	Matchbox Twenty	2012	E Standard - Lead/Rhythm; Drop D [Bass]	Matchbox Twenty 5-Song Pack		March 25, 2014	
"How Far We've Come"	Matchbox Twenty	2007	E Standard	Matchbox Twenty 5-Song Pack		March 25, 2014	
"Push"	Matchbox Twenty	1996	E♭ Standard	Matchbox Twenty 5-Song Pack		March 25, 2014	
"3AM"	Matchbox Twenty	1996	Capo Required	Matchbox Twenty 5-Song Pack		March 25, 2014	
"Totalimmortal"	AFI	1999	E Standard	AFI 4-Song Pack		April 1, 2014	
"Silver and Cold"	AFI	2003	E♭ Standard	AFI 4-Song Pack		April 1, 2014	
"Miss Murder"	AFI	2006	E♭ Standard	AFI 4-Song Pack		April 1, 2014	
"Girl's Not Grey"	AFI	2003	E♭ Standard	AFI 4-Song Pack		April 1, 2014	
"Subterranean Homesick Blues"	Bob Dylan	1965	E Standard	Bob Dylan 3-Song Pack		April 8, 2014	
"Like a Rolling Stone"	Bob Dylan	1965	E Standard	Bob Dylan 3-Song Pack		April 8, 2014	
"Just Like a Woman"	Bob Dylan	1966	E Standard - Lead/Bass; Capo Required [Rhythm]	Bob Dylan 3-Song Pack		April 8, 2014	
"I Think I'm Paranoid"	Garbage	1998	E Standard - Lead; Drop D [Rhythm/Bass]	Garbage 3-Song Pack		April 15, 2014	
"Only Happy When it Rains"	Garbage	1995	E Standard	Garbage 3-Song Pack		April 15, 2014	
"Stupid Girl"	Garbage	1996	E Standard	Garbage 3-Song Pack		April 15, 2014	
"Father of Mine"	Everclear	1997	E Standard	90s Rock Singles		April 22, 2014	
"Tomorrow"	Silverchair	1994	E Standard	90s Rock Singles		April 22, 2014	
"Two Princes"	Spin Doctors	1991	E Standard	90s Rock Singles		April 22, 2014	
"Blackbird"	Alter Bridge	2007	E♭ Standard - Lead / E♭ Drop D♭ [Rhythm/Bass]	Alter Bridge 4-Song Pack		April 29, 2014	
"Isolation"	Alter Bridge	2010	D Drop C	Alter Bridge 4-Song Pack		April 29, 2014	
"Rise Today"	Alter Bridge	2007	Drop D	Alter Bridge 4-Song Pack		April 29, 2014	
"Ties That Bind"	Alter Bridge	2007	D Standard	Alter Bridge 4-Song Pack		April 29, 2014	
"Amber"	311	2002	E Standard	311 3-Song Pack		May 6, 2014	
"Down"	311	1995	E Standard	311 3-Song Pack		May 6, 2014	
"Beautiful Disaster"	311	1997	E Standard	311 3-Song Pack		May 6, 2014	
"Colony of Birchmen"	Mastodon	2006	D Standard	Mastodon 3-Song Pack		May 13, 2014	
"Oblivion"	Mastodon	2009	D Drop C	Mastodon 3-Song Pack		May 13, 2014	
"Black Tongue"	Mastodon	2011	D Standard	Mastodon 3-Song Pack		May 13, 2014	
"Stickshifts and Safetybelts"	Cake	1996	E Standard	Cake 5-Song Pack		May 20, 2014	
"Short Skirt/Long Jacket"	Cake	2001	E Standard	Cake 5-Song Pack		May 20, 2014	
"Never There"	Cake	1998	E Standard	Cake 5-Song Pack		May 20, 2014	
"I Will Survive"	Cake	1996	E Standard	Cake 5-Song Pack		May 20, 2014	
"The Distance"	Cake	1997	E Standard	Cake 5-Song Pack		May 20, 2014	
"You're a Lie"	Slash	2012	E♭ Standard	Slash 3-Song Pack		May 27, 2014	
"Back from Cali"	Slash	2010	E Standard	Slash 3-Song Pack		May 27, 2014	
"Anastasia"	Slash	2012	E♭ Standard	Slash 3-Song Pack		May 27, 2014	
"Fat Lip"	Sum 41	2001	Drop D	Sum 41 5-Song Pack		June 3, 2014	
"In Too Deep"	Sum 41	2001	E Standard	Sum 41 5-Song Pack		June 3, 2014	
"The Hell Song"	Sum 41	2002	E Standard	Sum 41 5-Song Pack		June 3, 2014	
"Still Waiting"	Sum 41	2002	E Standard	Sum 41 5-Song Pack		June 3, 2014	
"We're All to Blame"	Sum 41	2004	E♭ Standard	Sum 41 5-Song Pack		June 3, 2014	
"Funk #49"	James Gang	1970	E Standard	Classic Singles		June 10, 2014	
"Ain't No Sunshine"	Bill Withers	1971	E Standard	Classic Singles		June 10, 2014	
"Sweet Dreams"	Roy Buchanan	1972	E Standard	Classic Singles		June 10, 2014	
"Awake"	Godsmack	2000	D Drop C	Godsmack 5-Song Pack		June 17, 2014	
"I Stand Alone"	Godsmack	2002	D Drop C	Godsmack 5-Song Pack		June 17, 2014	
"Love-Hate-Sex-Pain"	Godsmack	2010	Drop D	Godsmack 5-Song Pack		June 17, 2014	
"Cryin' Like a Bitch"	Godsmack	2010	Drop D	Godsmack 5-Song Pack		June 17, 2014	
"Voodoo"	Godsmack	1999	Drop D	Godsmack 5-Song Pack		June 17, 2014	
"Walk Don't Run"	The Ventures	1960	E Standard	Surf Rock 3-Song Pack		June 24, 2014	
"Wipe Out"	The Surfaris	1963	E Standard	Surf Rock 3-Song Pack		June 24, 2014	
"Misirlou"	Dick Dale	1962	E Standard	Surf Rock 3-Song Pack		June 24, 2014	
"Devil in a Midnight Mass"	Billy Talent	2006	Drop D	Billy Talent 5-Song Pack		July 1, 2014	
"Fallen Leaves"	Billy Talent	2006	Drop D	Billy Talent 5-Song Pack		July 1, 2014	
"Red Flag"	Billy Talent	2006	Drop D	Billy Talent 5-Song Pack		July 1, 2014	
"Try Honesty"	Billy Talent	2003	Drop D	Billy Talent 5-Song Pack		July 1, 2014	
"Viking Death March"	Billy Talent	2012	Drop D	Billy Talent 5-Song Pack		July 1, 2014	
"Can't Stand Me Now"	The Libertines	2004	E Standard	The Libertines 3-Song Pack		July 8, 2014	
"Don't Look Back into the Sun"	The Libertines	2003	E Standard	The Libertines 3-Song Pack		July 8, 2014	
"What Katie Did"	The Libertines	2004	E Standard	The Libertines 3-Song Pack		July 8, 2014	
"Be Quiet and Drive (Far Away)"	Deftones	1998	E♭ Drop D♭	Deftones 4-Song Pack		July 15, 2014	
"Change (In the House of Flies)"	Deftones	2000	D Drop C	Deftones 4-Song Pack		July 15, 2014	
"Digital Bath"	Deftones	2001	D Drop C	Deftones 4-Song Pack		July 15, 2014	
"Hole in the Earth"	Deftones	2006	Drop D	Deftones 4-Song Pack		July 15, 2014	
"China Grove"	The Doobie Brothers	1973	E Standard	Yacht Rock Singles		July 22, 2014	
"Escape (The Piña Colada Song)"	Rupert Holmes	1979	E Standard	Yacht Rock Singles		July 22, 2014	
"Hold the Line"	Toto	1978	E Standard	Yacht Rock Singles		July 22, 2014	
"I Keep Forgettin' (Every Time You're Near)"	Michael McDonald	1982	E Standard	Yacht Rock Singles		July 22, 2014	
"Kiss On My List"	Daryl Hall and John Oates	1981	E Standard	Yacht Rock Singles		July 22, 2014	
"Laid to Rest"	Lamb of God	2004	Drop D	Lamb of God 3-Song Pack		July 29, 2014	
"Walk With Me in Hell"	Lamb of God	2006	Drop D	Lamb of God 3-Song Pack		July 29, 2014	
"Ghost Walking"	Lamb of God	2012	E♭ Drop D♭	Lamb of God 3-Song Pack		July 29, 2014	
"Black Chandelier"	Biffy Clyro	2013	E♭ Drop D♭	Biffy Clyro 5-Song Pack		August 5, 2014	
"Bubbles"	Biffy Clyro	2009	E♭ Standard	Biffy Clyro 5-Song Pack		August 5, 2014	
"Many of Horror"	Biffy Clyro	2009	E♭ Drop D♭	Biffy Clyro 5-Song Pack		August 5, 2014	
"Mountains"	Biffy Clyro	2009	E♭ Drop D♭	Biffy Clyro 5-Song Pack		August 5, 2014	
"Stingin' Belle"	Biffy Clyro	2013	D Drop C	Biffy Clyro 5-Song Pack		August 5, 2014	
"Don't Speak"	No Doubt	1996	E Standard	No Doubt 3-Song Pack		August 12, 2014	
"Ex-Girlfriend"	No Doubt	1999	E Standard	No Doubt 3-Song Pack		August 12, 2014	
"Spiderwebs"	No Doubt	1995	E Standard	No Doubt 3-Song Pack		August 12, 2014	
"Hungry Like the Wolf"	Duran Duran	1982	E Standard	Duran Duran 3-Song Pack		August 19, 2014	
"Rio"	Duran Duran	1982	E Standard	Duran Duran 3-Song Pack		August 19, 2014	
"Ordinary World"	Duran Duran	1992	E Standard	Duran Duran 3-Song Pack		August 19, 2014	
"Rondo alla Turca"	Wolfgang Amadeus Mozart	1783	E Standard	Bachsmith 5-Song Pack		August 26, 2014	
"Moonlight Sonata: Adagio Sostenuto"	Ludwig van Beethoven	1801	E Standard	Bachsmith 5-Song Pack		August 26, 2014	
"In the Hall of the Mountain King"	Edvard Grieg	1867	E Standard	Bachsmith 5-Song Pack		August 26, 2014	
""Little" Fugue in G minor"	Johann Sebastian Bach	1707	E Standard - Lead/Bass/Alt. Bass; Drop D - Rhythm	Bachsmith 5-Song Pack		August 26, 2014	
"Ride of the Valkyries"	Richard Wagner	1856	E Standard	Bachsmith 5-Song Pack		August 26, 2014	
"Caress Me Down"	Sublime	1996	E Standard	Sublime 5-Song Pack		September 2, 2014	
"Santería"	Sublime	1996	E Standard	Sublime 5-Song Pack		September 2, 2014	
"What I Got"	Sublime	1996	E Standard	Sublime 5-Song Pack		September 2, 2014	
"Wrong Way"	Sublime	1996	E Standard	Sublime 5-Song Pack		September 2, 2014	
"Smoke Two Joints"	Sublime	1992	E Standard - Lead/Rhythm; Drop D - Bass	Sublime 5-Song Pack		September 2, 2014	
"Highway Star"	Deep Purple	1972	E Standard	70s Rock Singles		September 9, 2014	
"Simple Man"	Lynyrd Skynyrd	1976	E♭ Standard	70s Rock Singles		September 9, 2014	
"Stranglehold"	Ted Nugent	1975	E Standard	70s Rock Singles		September 9, 2014	
"Higher"	Creed	1999	Drop D	Creed 5-Song Pack		September 16, 2014	
"My Own Prison"	Creed	1997	Drop D	Creed 5-Song Pack		September 16, 2014	
"My Sacrifice"	Creed	2001	Custom (DADADd) - Lead/Rhythm; Drop D - Bass	Creed 5-Song Pack		September 16, 2014	
"One Last Breath"	Creed	2001	E Standard – Lead; Drop D – Rhythm/Bass	Creed 5-Song Pack		September 16, 2014	
"With Arms Wide Open"	Creed	1999	Drop D	Creed 5-Song Pack		September 16, 2014	
"45"	Shinedown	2003	E Standard	Shinedown 5-Song Pack		September 23, 2014	
"Bully"	Shinedown	2012	E♭ Drop D♭	Shinedown 5-Song Pack		September 23, 2014	
"Enemies"	Shinedown	2012	D Drop C	Shinedown 5-Song Pack		September 23, 2014	
"Second Chance"	Shinedown	2008	E Standard - Lead/Bass; Capo Required - Rhythm	Shinedown 5-Song Pack		September 23, 2014	
"Sound of Madness"	Shinedown	2009	Drop D	Shinedown 5-Song Pack		September 23, 2014	
"Cold as Ice"	Foreigner	1977	E Standard	Foreigner 5-Song Pack		September 30, 2014	
"Double Vision"	Foreigner	1978	E Standard	Foreigner 5-Song Pack		September 30, 2014	
"Feels Like the First Time"	Foreigner	1977	E Standard	Foreigner 5-Song Pack		September 30, 2014	
"Hot Blooded"	Foreigner	1978	E Standard	Foreigner 5-Song Pack		September 30, 2014	
"Juke Box Hero"	Foreigner	1981	E Standard	Foreigner 5-Song Pack		September 30, 2014	
"Be Yourself"	Audioslave	2005	Capo required - Lead/Rhythm; E Standard - Bass	Audioslave 5-Song Pack		October 7, 2014	
"Cochise"	Audioslave	2002	E Standard	Audioslave 5-Song Pack		October 7, 2014	
"I Am the Highway"	Audioslave	2002	E Standard	Audioslave 5-Song Pack		October 7, 2014	
"Like a Stone"	Audioslave	2002	E Standard	Audioslave 5-Song Pack		October 7, 2014	
"Show Me How to Live"	Audioslave	2002	Drop D	Audioslave 5-Song Pack		October 7, 2014	
"Blue Orchid"	The White Stripes	2005	E Standard	The White Stripes 5-Song Pack		October 14, 2014	
"Fell in Love With a Girl"	The White Stripes	2002	E Standard	The White Stripes 5-Song Pack		October 14, 2014	
"Seven Nation Army"	The White Stripes	2003	Open A Lead; E Standard - Rhythm/Bass	The White Stripes 5-Song Pack		October 14, 2014	
"The Hardest Button to Button"	The White Stripes	2003	E Standard	The White Stripes 5-Song Pack		October 14, 2014	
"You Don't Know What Love Is (You Just Do as You're Told)"	The White Stripes	2007	E Standard	The White Stripes 5-Song Pack		October 14, 2014	
"Holy Diver"	Dio	1983	E Standard	Arena Rock Singles		October 21, 2014	
"Seventeen"	Winger	1988	E♭ Standard	Arena Rock Singles		October 21, 2014	
"Turn Up the Radio"	Autograph	1984	E♭ Standard	Arena Rock Singles		October 21, 2014	
"The Stroke"	Billy Squier	1981	E Standard	Arena Rock Singles		October 21, 2014	
"Nothin' but a Good Time"	Poison	1988	E♭ Standard	Arena Rock Singles		October 21, 2014	
"Runaways"	The Killers	2012	E♭ Standard	The Killers 5-Song Pack		October 28, 2014	
"Spaceman"	The Killers	2008	E Standard	The Killers 5-Song Pack		October 28, 2014	
"Somebody Told Me"	The Killers	2004	E♭ Standard	The Killers 5-Song Pack		October 28, 2014	
"When You Were Young"	The Killers	2006	E♭ Standard	The Killers 5-Song Pack		October 28, 2014	
"Mr. Brightside"	The Killers	2004	E♭ Standard	The Killers 5-Song Pack		October 28, 2014	
"The End of Heartache"	Killswitch Engage	2004	D Drop C	Killswitch Engage 3-Song Pack		November 4, 2014	
"Holy Diver" (Dio cover)	Killswitch Engage	2007	D Drop C	Killswitch Engage 3-Song Pack		November 4, 2014	
"My Curse"	Killswitch Engage	2006	D Drop C	Killswitch Engage 3-Song Pack		November 4, 2014	
"American Girl"	Tom Petty and the Heartbreakers	1977	E Standard	Tom Petty 5-Song Pack		November 11, 2014	
"Learning to Fly"	Tom Petty and the Heartbreakers	1991	E Standard	Tom Petty 5-Song Pack		November 11, 2014	
"Refugee"	Tom Petty and the Heartbreakers	1980	E Standard	Tom Petty 5-Song Pack		November 11, 2014	
"Free Fallin'"	Tom Petty	1989	E Standard - Lead/Bass; Capo Required - Alt. Lead/Rhythm	Tom Petty 5-Song Pack		November 11, 2014	
"I Won't Back Down"	Tom Petty	1989	Open G - Lead; E Standard - Alt. Lead/Rhythm/Bass	Tom Petty 5-Song Pack		November 11, 2014	
"Learn to Fly"	Foo Fighters	1999	E Standard	Foo Fighters II 5-Song Pack		November 18, 2014	
"Long Road to Ruin"	Foo Fighters	2007	E Standard	Foo Fighters II 5-Song Pack		November 18, 2014	
"Monkey Wrench"	Foo Fighters	1997	Drop D	Foo Fighters II 5-Song Pack		November 18, 2014	
"The Pretender"	Foo Fighters	2007	E Standard	Foo Fighters II 5-Song Pack		November 18, 2014	
"Rope"	Foo Fighters	2011	E Standard	Foo Fighters II 5-Song Pack		November 18, 2014	
"Hand of Blood"	Bullet for My Valentine	2005	D Drop C	Bullet for My Valentine 5-Song Pack		November 25, 2014	
"Hearts Burst into Fire"	Bullet for My Valentine	2008	D Drop C	Bullet for My Valentine 5-Song Pack		November 25, 2014	
"Tears Don't Fall"	Bullet for My Valentine	2006	D Drop C; D Standard - Bass	Bullet for My Valentine 5-Song Pack		November 25, 2014	
"Your Betrayal"	Bullet for My Valentine	2010	D Drop C	Bullet for My Valentine 5-Song Pack		November 25, 2014	
"Scream Aim Fire"	Bullet for My Valentine	2007	D Standard	Bullet for My Valentine 5-Song Pack		November 25, 2014	
"Blaze of Glory"	Jon Bon Jovi	1991	E Standard - Lead/Rhythm; Drop D [Bass]	Bon Jovi 5-Song Pack		December 2, 2014	
"It's My Life"	Bon Jovi	2000	E Standard - Lead/Rhythm; D Drop C [Bass]	Bon Jovi 5-Song Pack		December 2, 2014	
"Livin' on a Prayer"	Bon Jovi	1986	E Standard	Bon Jovi 5-Song Pack		December 2, 2014	
"Wanted Dead or Alive"	Bon Jovi	1986	E Standard	Bon Jovi 5-Song Pack		December 2, 2014	
"You Give Love a Bad Name"	Bon Jovi	1986	E Standard	Bon Jovi 5-Song Pack		December 2, 2014	
"Bombtrack"	Rage Against the Machine	1991	E Standard	Rage Against the Machine 7-Song Pack		December 9, 2014	
"Know Your Enemy"	Rage Against the Machine	1991	E Standard	Rage Against the Machine 7-Song Pack		December 9, 2014	
"Killing in the Name"	Rage Against the Machine	1991	Drop D	Rage Against the Machine 7-Song Pack		December 9, 2014	
"Wake Up"	Rage Against the Machine	1992	Drop D	Rage Against the Machine 7-Song Pack		December 9, 2014	
"Bulls on Parade"	Rage Against the Machine	1996	E♭ Standard	Rage Against the Machine 7-Song Pack		December 9, 2014	
"Down Rodeo"	Rage Against the Machine	1996	E Standard	Rage Against the Machine 7-Song Pack		December 9, 2014	
"Renegades of Funk"	Rage Against the Machine	2000	Drop D	Rage Against the Machine 7-Song Pack		December 9, 2014	
"Bold as Love"	The Jimi Hendrix Experience	1967	E♭ Standard	Jimi Hendrix 12-Song Pack		December 16, 2014	
"Castles Made of Sand"	The Jimi Hendrix Experience	1967	E Standard: A428	Jimi Hendrix 12-Song Pack		December 16, 2014	
"Fire"	The Jimi Hendrix Experience	1967	E Standard	Jimi Hendrix 12-Song Pack		December 16, 2014	
"Foxy Lady"	The Jimi Hendrix Experience	1967	E Standard	Jimi Hendrix 12-Song Pack		December 16, 2014	
"If 6 Was 9"	The Jimi Hendrix Experience	1967	E♭ Standard: A431	Jimi Hendrix 12-Song Pack		December 16, 2014	
"Little Wing"	The Jimi Hendrix Experience	1967	E♭ Standard	Jimi Hendrix 12-Song Pack		December 16, 2014	
"Manic Depression"	The Jimi Hendrix Experience	1967	E♭ Standard: A447	Jimi Hendrix 12-Song Pack		December 16, 2014	
"Purple Haze"	The Jimi Hendrix Experience	1967	E Standard	Jimi Hendrix 12-Song Pack		December 16, 2014	
"The Wind Cries Mary"	The Jimi Hendrix Experience	1967	E Standard	Jimi Hendrix 12-Song Pack		December 16, 2014	
"Red House"	The Jimi Hendrix Experience	1966	E♭ Standard	Jimi Hendrix 12-Song Pack		December 16, 2014	
"Freedom"	The Jimi Hendrix Experience	1971	E♭ Standard	Jimi Hendrix 12-Song Pack		December 16, 2014	
"Voodoo Child (Slight Return)"	The Jimi Hendrix Experience	1968	E♭ Standard: A437	Jimi Hendrix 12-Song Pack		December 16, 2014	
"Bleed It Out"	Linkin Park	2007	Drop D	Linkin Park 6-Song Pack		January 6, 2015	
"Guilty All the Same"	Linkin Park	2014	Drop D	Linkin Park 6-Song Pack		January 6, 2015	
"In The End"	Linkin Park	2000	E♭ Drop D♭	Linkin Park 6-Song Pack		January 6, 2015	
"Numb"	Linkin Park	2003	E♭ Drop D♭	Linkin Park 6-Song Pack		January 6, 2015	
"One Step Closer"	Linkin Park	2000	E♭ Drop D♭	Linkin Park 6-Song Pack		January 6, 2015	
"What I've Done"	Linkin Park	2007	Drop D	Linkin Park 6-Song Pack		January 6, 2015	
"Black Hole Sun"	Soundgarden	1994	Drop D: A455	Soundgarden 5-Song Pack		January 13, 2015	
"Fell on Black Days"	Soundgarden	1994	E Standard	Soundgarden 5-Song Pack		January 13, 2015	
"Jesus Christ Pose"	Soundgarden	1991	Drop D	Soundgarden 5-Song Pack		January 13, 2015	
"Pretty Noose"	Soundgarden	1996	Custom Tuning (CGCGGE)	Soundgarden 5-Song Pack		January 13, 2015	
"Spoonman"	Soundgarden	1994	Drop D	Soundgarden 5-Song Pack		January 13, 2015	
"Rainbow in the Dark"	Dio	1983	E Standard	Classic Riff Singles		January 20, 2015	
"Ace of Spades"	Motörhead	1980	E♭ Standard	Classic Riff Singles		January 20, 2015	
"Rock and Roll, Hoochie Koo"	Rick Derringer	1973	E Standard: A446	Classic Riff Singles		January 20, 2015	
"Renegade"	Styx	1978	E Standard	Classic Riff Singles		January 20, 2015	
"Cherry Pie"	Warrant	1990	E Standard	Classic Riff Singles		January 20, 2015	
"Animal I Have Become"	Three Days Grace	2006	D Drop C	Three Days Grace 5-Song Pack		January 27, 2015	
"Break"	Three Days Grace	2009	Drop D	Three Days Grace 5-Song Pack		January 27, 2015	
"Just Like You"	Three Days Grace	2003	E♭ Drop D♭	Three Days Grace 5-Song Pack		January 27, 2015	
"Never Too Late"	Three Days Grace	2006	Drop D	Three Days Grace 5-Song Pack		January 27, 2015	
"Riot"	Three Days Grace	2006	D Drop C	Three Days Grace 5-Song Pack		January 27, 2015	
"Amanda"	Boston	1986	E Standard - Lead/Alt. Lead/Rhythm; Drop D - Bass	Power Ballad Singles		February 3, 2015	
"Every Rose Has Its Thorn"	Poison	1988	E♭ Standard	Power Ballad Singles		February 3, 2015	
"More Than Words"	Extreme	1990	E♭ Standard	Power Ballad Singles		February 3, 2015	
"Don't Know What You Got (Till It's Gone)"	Cinderella	1988	E Standard	Power Ballad Singles		February 3, 2015	
"Love Song"	Tesla	1989	E Standard	Power Ballad Singles		February 3, 2015	
"Remedy"	Seether	2005	E♭ Drop D♭	Seether 3-Song Pack		February 10, 2015	
"Fake It"	Seether	2007	D Drop C	Seether 3-Song Pack		February 10, 2015	
"Broken"	Seether feat. Amy Lee	2002	E♭ Standard	Seether 3-Song Pack		February 10, 2015	
"Jane Says"	Jane's Addiction	1987	E Standard	Jane's Addiction 5-Song Pack		February 17, 2015	
"Mountain Song"	Jane's Addiction	1988	E Standard	Jane's Addiction 5-Song Pack		February 17, 2015	
"Been Caught Stealing"	Jane's Addiction	1990	E Standard	Jane's Addiction 5-Song Pack		February 17, 2015	
"Just Because"	Jane's Addiction	2003	E♭ Standard	Jane's Addiction 5-Song Pack		February 17, 2015	
"SuperHero"	Jane's Addiction	2003	Custom Tuning (F Standard)	Jane's Addiction 5-Song Pack		February 17, 2015	
"Last Resort"	Papa Roach	2000	Drop D	Papa Roach 3-Song Pack		February 24, 2015	
"Scars"	Papa Roach	2004	E♭ Drop D♭	Papa Roach 3-Song Pack		February 24, 2015	
"Getting Away With Murder"	Papa Roach	2004	D Drop C	Papa Roach 3-Song Pack		February 24, 2015	
"Just What I Needed"	The Cars	1978	E Standard	The Cars 5-Song Pack		March 3, 2015	
"Good Times Roll"	The Cars	1978	E Standard	The Cars 5-Song Pack		March 3, 2015	
"Bye Bye Love"	The Cars	1978	E Standard	The Cars 5-Song Pack		March 3, 2015	
"You're All I've Got Tonight"	The Cars	1978	E Standard	The Cars 5-Song Pack		March 3, 2015	
"Let's Go"	The Cars	1979	E Standard	The Cars 5-Song Pack		March 3, 2015	
"Hallelujah"	Jeff Buckley	1994	Capo Required - Lead; E Standard - Rhythm/Bass	Jeff Buckley 3-Song Pack		March 10, 2015	
"Grace"	Jeff Buckley	1994	Drop D	Jeff Buckley 3-Song Pack		March 10, 2015	
"Last Goodbye"	Jeff Buckley	1994	Open G - Lead/Rhythm; Drop D - Bass	Jeff Buckley 3-Song Pack		March 10, 2015	
"Alternative Ulster"	Stiff Little Fingers	1979	E Standard	Shamrock 5-Song Pack		March 17, 2015	
"Zombie"	The Cranberries	1994	E Standard	Shamrock 5-Song Pack		March 17, 2015	
"Drunken Lullabies"	Flogging Molly	2002	E Standard	Shamrock 5-Song Pack		March 17, 2015	
"I'm Shipping Up to Boston"	Dropkick Murphys	2005	E Standard	Shamrock 5-Song Pack		March 17, 2015	
"Becoming a Jackal"	Villagers	2010	E Standard	Shamrock 5-Song Pack		March 17, 2015	
"Madhouse"	Anthrax	1985	E Standard	Anthrax 4-Song Pack		March 24, 2015	
"Caught in a Mosh"	Anthrax	1987	E Standard	Anthrax 4-Song Pack		March 24, 2015	
"Indians"	Anthrax	1987	E Standard	Anthrax 4-Song Pack		March 24, 2015	
"Got the Time"	Anthrax	1990	E Standard	Anthrax 4-Song Pack		March 24, 2015	
"Stonehenge"	Spinal Tap	1984	E Standard	Spinal Tap 5-Song Pack		March 31, 2015	
"Tonight I'm Gonna Rock You Tonight"	Spinal Tap	1984	E Standard	Spinal Tap 5-Song Pack		March 31, 2015	
"Sex Farm"	Spinal Tap	1984	E Standard	Spinal Tap 5-Song Pack		March 31, 2015	
"Big Bottom"	Spinal Tap	1984	E Standard	Spinal Tap 5-Song Pack		March 31, 2015	
"Gimme Some Money"	Spinal Tap	1984	E Standard	Spinal Tap 5-Song Pack		March 31, 2015	
"Comedown"	Bush	1994	E Standard	Bush 4-Song Pack		April 7, 2015	
"Everything Zen"	Bush	1994	E Standard	Bush 4-Song Pack		April 7, 2015	
"Glycerine"	Bush	1994	E Standard	Bush 4-Song Pack		April 7, 2015	
"Swallowed"	Bush	1996	E Standard	Bush 4-Song Pack		April 7, 2015	
"The Boys Are Back In Town"	Thin Lizzy	1976	E♭ Standard	Thin Lizzy 3-Song Pack		April 14, 2015	
"Jailbreak"	Thin Lizzy	1976	E♭ Standard	Thin Lizzy 3-Song Pack		April 14, 2015	
"Dancing in the Moonlight (It's Caught Me in Its Spotlight)"	Thin Lizzy	1977	E Standard	Thin Lizzy 3-Song Pack		April 14, 2015	
"Feel the Pain"	Dinosaur Jr.	1994	Capo Required - Lead/Rhythm; E Standard - Bass	Alternative Rock Singles		April 21, 2015	
"My Own Worst Enemy"	Lit	1999	E Standard - Lead/Rhythm; E♭ Standard - Bass	Alternative Rock Singles		April 21, 2015	
"Hemorrhage (In My Hands)"	Fuel	2000	E♭ Standard	Alternative Rock Singles		April 21, 2015	
"Ocean Avenue"	Yellowcard	2003	Drop D	Alternative Rock Singles		April 21, 2015	
"Through Glass"	Stone Sour	2006	E♭ Standard	Alternative Rock Singles		April 21, 2015	
"Thunderhorse"	Dethklok	2007	C Standard	Dethklok 3-Song Pack		April 28, 2015	
"Awaken"	Dethklok	2007	C Standard	Dethklok 3-Song Pack		April 28, 2015	
"Go into the Water"	Dethklok	2007	C Standard	Dethklok 3-Song Pack		April 28, 2015	
"Spoonful"	Howlin’ Wolf	1960	E Standard: A446	Blues Song Pack		May 5, 2015	
"Boom Boom"	John Lee Hooker	1967	E Standard	Blues Song Pack		May 5, 2015	
"Hide Away"	Freddie King	1961	E Standard	Blues Song Pack		May 5, 2015	
"Ain’t No Love In The Heart Of The City"	Bobby "Blue" Bland	1974	E Standard	Blues Song Pack		May 5, 2015	
"Be Careful with a Fool"	Johnny Winter	1969	E Standard	Blues Song Pack		May 5, 2015	
"Two Weeks"	All That Remains	2008	C♯ Standard	All That Remains Song Pack		May 12, 2015	
"Six"	All That Remains	2006	D Standard	All That Remains Song Pack		May 12, 2015	
"This Calling"	All That Remains	2006	D Standard	All That Remains Song Pack		May 12, 2015	
"Angel of Death"	Slayer	1986	E♭ Standard	Slayer 5-Song Pack		May 19, 2015	
"Dead Skin Mask"	Slayer	1990	E♭ Standard	Slayer 5-Song Pack		May 19, 2015	
"Raining Blood"	Slayer	1986	E♭ Standard	Slayer 5-Song Pack		May 19, 2015	
"Seasons in the Abyss"	Slayer	1990	E♭ Standard	Slayer 5-Song Pack		May 19, 2015	
"South of Heaven"	Slayer	1988	E♭ Standard	Slayer 5-Song Pack		May 19, 2015	
"Lovely Day"	Bill Withers	1977	E Standard	Love Singles Song Pack		May 26, 2015	
"Friday I'm in Love"	The Cure	1992	E Standard: A456 - Lead/Rhythm; Drop D: A456 - Bass	Love Singles Song Pack		May 26, 2015	
"For the Love of God"	Steve Vai	1990	E Standard	Love Singles Song Pack		May 26, 2015	
"3's and 7's"	Queens of the Stone Age	2007	C Standard	Queens of the Stone Age 5-Song Pack		June 2, 2015	
"I Appear Missing"	Queens of the Stone Age	2013	E Standard	Queens of the Stone Age 5-Song Pack		June 2, 2015	
"Little Sister"	Queens of the Stone Age	2004	E Standard	Queens of the Stone Age 5-Song Pack		June 2, 2015	
"Make It wit Chu"	Queens of the Stone Age	2007	E Standard	Queens of the Stone Age 5-Song Pack		June 2, 2015	
"No One Knows"	Queens of the Stone Age	2002	C Standard	Queens of the Stone Age 5-Song Pack		June 2, 2015	
"Rock This Town"	Brian Setzer	2010	E Standard	Rockabilly Song Pack		June 9, 2015	
"Blue Suede Shoes"	Carl Perkins	1956	E Standard	Rockabilly Song Pack		June 9, 2015	
"Be-Bop-A-Lula"	Gene Vincent and His Blue Caps	1956	E Standard	Rockabilly Song Pack		June 9, 2015	
"Hello Mary Lou (Goodbye Heart)"	Ricky Nelson	1961	E Standard	Rockabilly Song Pack		June 9, 2015	
"Crazy Little Thing Called Love"	Queen	1979	E Standard	Rockabilly Song Pack		June 9, 2015	
"Balls to the Wall"	Accept	1984	E Standard: A446	Player Picks Song Pack		June 16, 2015	
"Frankenstein"	Edgar Winter Group	1973	E Standard	Player Picks Song Pack		June 16, 2015	
"All Right Now"	Free	1970	E Standard	Player Picks Song Pack		June 16, 2015	
"Modern Day Cowboy"	Tesla	1987	E Standard	Player Picks Song Pack		June 16, 2015	
"Jerry Was a Race Car Driver"	Primus	1991	E Standard	Primus Song Pack		June 23, 2015	
"South Park Theme"	Primus	1997	E Standard	Primus Song Pack		June 23, 2015	
"Tommy the Cat"	Primus	1991	E Standard	Primus Song Pack		June 23, 2015	
"Wynona's Big Brown Beaver"	Primus	1995	E Standard	Primus Song Pack		June 23, 2015	
"I'm So Lonesome I Could Cry"	Hank Williams	1949	E Standard	Classic Country Song Pack		June 30, 2015	
"King of the Road"	Roger Miller	1965	E Standard	Classic Country Song Pack		June 30, 2015	
"On the Road Again"	Willie Nelson	1980	E Standard	Classic Country Song Pack		June 30, 2015	
"A Warrior's Call"	Volbeat	2011	D Standard	Volbeat Song Pack		July 7, 2015	
"Fallen"	Volbeat	2010	D Standard	Volbeat Song Pack		July 7, 2015	
"Heaven Nor Hell"	Volbeat	2010	D Standard	Volbeat Song Pack		July 7, 2015	
"Lola Montez"	Volbeat	2013	D Standard	Volbeat Song Pack		July 7, 2015	
"Still Counting"	Volbeat	2012	D Standard	Volbeat Song Pack		July 7, 2015	
"Call Me the Breeze"	Lynyrd Skynyrd	1974	E Standard	Lynyrd Skynyrd Song Pack		July 14, 2015	
"Gimme Three Steps"	Lynyrd Skynyrd	1973	E Standard	Lynyrd Skynyrd Song Pack		July 14, 2015	
"Tuesday's Gone"	Lynyrd Skynyrd	1973	E Standard	Lynyrd Skynyrd Song Pack		July 14, 2015	
"Another One Bites the Dust"	Queen	1980	E Standard	Regal Singles Song Pack		July 21, 2015	
"Silent Lucidity"	Queensrÿche	1991	E Standard - Lead/RhythmDrop D [Bass]	Regal Singles Song Pack		July 21, 2015	
"Sir Duke"	Stevie Wonder	1977	E Standard - Lead/Rhythm/Bass; E♭ Standard [Alt. Bass]	Regal Singles Song Pack		July 21, 2015	
"Rock & Roll Queen"	The Subways	2005	E♭ Standard	Regal Singles Song Pack		July 21, 2015	
"Possum Kingdom"	Toadies	1995	E Standard	Regal Singles Song Pack		July 21, 2015	
"Digging the Grave"	Faith No More	1995	E Standard	Faith No More Song Pack		July 28, 2015	
"Epic"	Faith No More	1990	E Standard	Faith No More Song Pack		July 28, 2015	
"Falling to Pieces"	Faith No More	1990	E Standard	Faith No More Song Pack		July 28, 2015	
"From Out of Nowhere"	Faith No More	1989	E Standard	Faith No More Song Pack		July 28, 2015	
"Midlife Crisis"	Faith No More	1992	E Standard	Faith No More Song Pack		July 28, 2015	
"Rock around the Clock"	Bill Haley & His Comets	1954	E Standard	50's Singles		August 4, 2015	
"Tequila"	The Champs	1958	E Standard	50's Singles		August 4, 2015	
"La Bamba"	Ritchie Valens	1958	E Standard	50's Singles		August 4, 2015	
"Bad Luck"	Social Distortion	1992	E♭ Standard	Social Distortion Song Pack		August 11, 2015	
"Ball and Chain"	Social Distortion	1990	E♭ Standard	Social Distortion Song Pack		August 11, 2015	
"Reach for the Sky"	Social Distortion	2004	E♭ Standard Capo Required [Lead/Rhythm]; E♭ Standard - Bass	Social Distortion Song Pack		August 11, 2015	
"Story of My Life"	Social Distortion	1990	E♭ Standard	Social Distortion Song Pack		August 11, 2015	
"Rock of Ages"	Def Leppard	1983	E Standard	Hit Singles Song Pack		August 18, 2015	
"Go Your Own Way"	Fleetwood Mac	1976	E Standard - Lead/Bass; Capo Required [Rhythm]	Hit Singles Song Pack		August 18, 2015	
"Are You Gonna Be My Girl"	Jet	2003	E Standard	Hit Singles Song Pack		August 18, 2015	
"Dust in the Wind"	Kansas	1978	E Standard	Hit Singles Song Pack		August 18, 2015	
"Love Spreads"	The Stone Roses	1994	Open D: A443 [Lead]; Drop D: A443 [Rhythm]; D Standard: A443 [Bass]	The Stone Roses 3 Song Pack		August 25, 2015	
"She Bangs the Drums"	The Stone Roses	1989	E Standard	The Stone Roses 3 Song Pack		August 25, 2015	
"I Wanna Be Adored"	The Stone Roses	1989	E Standard	The Stone Roses 3 Song Pack		August 25, 2015	
"Sing a Song"	Earth, Wind & Fire	1975	E Standard	Earth, Wind & Fire 3 Song Pack		September 1, 2015	
"Shining Star"	Earth, Wind & Fire	1975	E Standard	Earth, Wind & Fire 3 Song Pack		September 1, 2015	
"September"	Earth, Wind & Fire	1978	E Standard	Earth, Wind & Fire 3 Song Pack		September 1, 2015	
"Dirty Little Secret"	The All-American Rejects	2005	E Standard - Lead/Bass; Capo Required [Rhythm]	The All-American Rejects 3 Song Pack		September 8, 2015	
"Gives You Hell"	The All-American Rejects	2008	E Standard	The All-American Rejects 3 Song Pack		September 8, 2015	
"Move Along"	The All-American Rejects	2006	E♭ Standard	The All-American Rejects 3 Song Pack		September 8, 2015	
"Break On Through (To the Other Side)"	The Doors	1967	E Standard	The Doors 3 Song Pack II		September 15, 2015	
"L.A. Woman"	The Doors	1971	E Standard	The Doors 3 Song Pack II		September 15, 2015	
"People Are Strange"	The Doors	1967	E Standard: A445	The Doors 3 Song Pack II		September 15, 2015	
"Blow Me Away"	Breaking Benjamin	2011	D Drop C	Breaking Benjamin Song Pack		September 22, 2015	
"Polyamorous"	Breaking Benjamin	2002	E♭ Drop D♭	Breaking Benjamin Song Pack		September 22, 2015	
"So Cold"	Breaking Benjamin	2004	D Drop C	Breaking Benjamin Song Pack		September 22, 2015	
"Okay I Believe You, But My Tommy Gun Don't"	Brand New	2003	E♭ Drop D♭	Brand New Song Pack		September 29, 2015	
"The Quiet Things That No One Ever Knows"	Brand New	2003	E♭ Standard	Brand New Song Pack		September 29, 2015	
"Sic Transit Gloria... Glory Fades"	Brand New	2003	E♭ Standard	Brand New Song Pack		September 29, 2015	
"Sloe Gin"	Joe Bonamassa	2007	E Standard - Lead/Rhythm; Drop D [Bass]	Blues Rock Song Pack		October 6, 2015	
"Blue on Black"	Kenny Wayne Shepherd	1998	Drop D [Lead]; E Standard -Rhythm/Bass	Blues Rock Song Pack		October 6, 2015	
"Out Of My Mind"	Philip Sayce	2014	E♭ Standard	Blues Rock Song Pack		October 6, 2015	
"Strutter"	Kiss	1974	E♭ Standard	Kiss Song Pack 2		October 13, 2015	
"Love Gun"	Kiss	1977	E♭ Standard	Kiss Song Pack 2		October 13, 2015	
"God of Thunder"	Kiss	1976	E♭ Standard	Kiss Song Pack 2		October 13, 2015	
"Dear Maria, Count Me In"	All Time Low	2007	Drop D	All Time Low Song Pack		October 20, 2015	
"Somewhere in Neverland"	All Time Low	2012	E♭ Drop D♭ - Lead/Rhythm; E♭ Standard [Bass]	All Time Low Song Pack		October 20, 2015	
"Weightless"	All Time Low	2009	Drop D	All Time Low Song Pack		October 20, 2015	
"Devil on My Shoulder"	Billy Talent	2009	Drop D	Spooktacular Singles		October 27, 2015	
"Hocus Pocus"	Focus	1971	E Standard	Spooktacular Singles		October 27, 2015	
"Killed by Death"	Motörhead	1984	E♭ Standard	Spooktacular Singles		October 27, 2015	
"Dead Man's Party"	Oingo Boingo	1986	E Standard	Spooktacular Singles		October 27, 2015	
"Ziggy Stardust"	David Bowie	1972	E Standard	Hit Singles II Song Pack		November 3, 2015	
"Hysteria"	Def Leppard	1987	E Standard	Hit Singles II Song Pack		November 3, 2015	
"Slow Ride"	Foghat	1975	Open E [Lead] / E Standard - Rhythm/Bass	Hit Singles II Song Pack		November 3, 2015	
"Joker and the Thief"	Wolfmother	2006	Drop D	Hit Singles II Song Pack		November 3, 2015	
"Fall Back Down"	Rancid	2003	Capo Required [Lead;Rhythm]; E Standard - Bass	Rancid 4 Song Pack		November 10, 2015	
"Maxwell Murder"	Rancid	1995	E Standard	Rancid 4 Song Pack		November 10, 2015	
"Ruby Soho"	Rancid	1995	E Standard	Rancid 4 Song Pack		November 10, 2015	
"Time Bomb"	Rancid	1995	E Standard	Rancid 4 Song Pack		November 10, 2015	
"Ode to Joy"	Ludwig van Beethoven	1824	E Standard	Bachsmith 2 5-Song Pack		November 17, 2015	
"Funeral March"	Frédéric Chopin	1839	E Standard	Bachsmith 2 5-Song Pack		November 17, 2015	
"The Can-Can"	Jacques Offenbach	1858	E Standard	Bachsmith 2 5-Song Pack		November 17, 2015	
"Notecracker Medley"	Pyotr Ilyich Tchaikovsky	1892	E Standard	Bachsmith 2 5-Song Pack		November 17, 2015	
"Symphony No. 40"	Wolfgang Amadeus Mozart	1788	E Standard	Bachsmith 2 5-Song Pack		November 17, 2015	
"Howlin' for You"	The Black Keys	2011	E Standard	The Black Keys 5-Song Pack		November 24, 2015	
"Little Black Submarines"	The Black Keys	2012	E Standard	The Black Keys 5-Song Pack		November 24, 2015	
"Lonely Boy"	The Black Keys	2011	E Standard	The Black Keys 5-Song Pack		November 24, 2015	
"thickfreakness"	The Black Keys	2003	E Standard	The Black Keys 5-Song Pack		November 24, 2015	
"Your Touch"	The Black Keys	2006	E Standard	The Black Keys 5-Song Pack		November 24, 2015	
"Awake And Alive"	Skillet	2009	Drop D	Skillet 3-Song Pack		December 1, 2015	
"Hero"	Skillet	2009	E♭ Drop D♭	Skillet 3-Song Pack		December 1, 2015	
"Monster"	Skillet	2009	D Drop C	Skillet 3-Song Pack		December 1, 2015	
"Joy to the World"	Band of Merrymakers	1836	E Standard	—N/a		December 1, 2015	
"Must Be Christmas"	Band of Merrymakers	1998	E Standard	—N/a		December 1, 2015	
"Master Exploder"	Tenacious D	2006	E Standard	Tenacious D 3-Song Pack		December 8, 2015	
"The Metal"	Tenacious D	2006	Drop D	Tenacious D 3-Song Pack		December 8, 2015	
"Tribute"	Tenacious D	2002	E Standard	Tenacious D 3-Song Pack		December 8, 2015	
"Dr. Feelgood"	Mötley Crüe	1989	D Standard	Mötley Crüe 5-Song Pack		December 15, 2015	
"Home Sweet Home"	Mötley Crüe	1985	D Standard	Mötley Crüe 5-Song Pack		December 15, 2015	
"Kickstart My Heart"	Mötley Crüe	1989	D Standard	Mötley Crüe 5-Song Pack		December 15, 2015	
"Girls Girls Girls"	Mötley Crüe	1987	D Standard	Mötley Crüe 5-Song Pack		December 15, 2015	
"Shout At The Devil"	Mötley Crüe	1983	D Standard	Mötley Crüe 5-Song Pack		December 15, 2015	
"Big Empty"	Stone Temple Pilots	1994	E Standard	Stone Temple Pilots 6-Song Pack		December 22, 2015	
"Creep"	Stone Temple Pilots	1993	E Standard	Stone Temple Pilots 6-Song Pack		December 22, 2015	
"Interstate Love Song"	Stone Temple Pilots	1994	E Standard	Stone Temple Pilots 6-Song Pack		December 22, 2015	
"Plush"	Stone Temple Pilots	1993	E Standard	Stone Temple Pilots 6-Song Pack		December 22, 2015	
"Sex Type Thing"	Stone Temple Pilots	1993	E Standard	Stone Temple Pilots 6-Song Pack		December 22, 2015	
"Wicked Garden"	Stone Temple Pilots	1992	E Standard	Stone Temple Pilots 6-Song Pack		December 22, 2015	
"Heat Of The Moment"	Asia	1982	E Standard	Hit Singles III 4-Song Pack		January 5, 2016	
"Closing Time"	Semisonic	1998	E Standard	Hit Singles III 4-Song Pack		January 5, 2016	
"Play That Funky Music"	Wild Cherry	1976	E Standard	Hit Singles III 4-Song Pack		January 5, 2016	
"Woman"	Wolfmother	2005	E Standard	Hit Singles III 4-Song Pack		January 5, 2016	
"Closer to the Edge"	Thirty Seconds to Mars	2010	E♭ Standard	Thirty Seconds to Mars 5-Song Pack		January 12, 2016	
"From Yesterday"	Thirty Seconds to Mars	2006	D Drop C	Thirty Seconds to Mars 5-Song Pack		January 12, 2016	
"The Kill"	Thirty Seconds to Mars	2006	E Standard	Thirty Seconds to Mars 5-Song Pack		January 12, 2016	
"Kings and Queens"	Thirty Seconds to Mars	2009	E♭ Standard	Thirty Seconds to Mars 5-Song Pack		January 12, 2016	
"This is War"	Thirty Seconds to Mars	2010	E♭ Standard – Lead/Rhythm; E♭ Drop D♭ – Bass	Thirty Seconds to Mars 5-Song Pack		January 12, 2016	
"A Tout Le Monde"	Megadeth	1994	E♭ Standard	Megadeth Song Pack II		January 19, 2016	
"Holy Wars… The Punishment Due"	Megadeth	1990	E Standard	Megadeth Song Pack II		January 19, 2016	
"Peace Sells"	Megadeth	1986	E Standard	Megadeth Song Pack II		January 19, 2016	
"Tornado Of Souls"	Megadeth	1990	E Standard	Megadeth Song Pack II		January 19, 2016	
"Trust"	Megadeth	1997	E Standard	Megadeth Song Pack II		January 19, 2016	
"Caught Up In You"	38 Special	1982	E Standard	38 Special 3-Song Pack		January 26, 2016	
"Hold On Loosely"	38 Special	1981	E Standard	38 Special 3-Song Pack		January 26, 2016	
"Rockin’ Into The Night"	38 Special	1980	E Standard	38 Special 3-Song Pack		January 26, 2016	
"All I Want"	The Offspring	1996	E Standard	The Offspring II 5-Song Pack		February 2, 2016	
"Pretty Fly (For a White Guy)"	The Offspring	1998	E Standard	The Offspring II 5-Song Pack		February 2, 2016	
"The Kids Aren’t Alright"	The Offspring	1998	E Standard	The Offspring II 5-Song Pack		February 2, 2016	
"Want You Bad"	The Offspring	2000	E Standard	The Offspring II 5-Song Pack		February 2, 2016	
"You're Gonna Go Far Kid"	The Offspring	2008	E Standard	The Offspring II 5-Song Pack		February 2, 2016	
"You Make My Dreams"	Hall & Oates	1981	E Standard	Valentine's Day 4-Song Pack		February 9, 2016	
"All for You"	Sister Hazel	1997	E♭ Standard (Capo Required) - Lead/Rhythm; E♭ Standard - Bass	Valentine's Day 4-Song Pack		February 9, 2016	
"Kiss Me"	Sixpence None the Richer	1998	E Standard (Capo Required) - Lead/Rhythm; E Standard - Bass	Valentine's Day 4-Song Pack		February 9, 2016	
"Rosanna"	Toto	1982	E Standard	Valentine's Day 4-Song Pack		February 9, 2016	
"The Outsider"	A Perfect Circle	2003	C♯ Standard	Hit Singles 4 4-Song Pack		February 16, 2016	
"Long Train Runnin"	The Doobie Brothers	1973	E Standard	Hit Singles 4 4-Song Pack		February 16, 2016	
"Working For The Weekend"	Loverboy	1981	E Standard	Hit Singles 4 4-Song Pack		February 16, 2016	
"Badfish"	Sublime	1993	E Standard - Lead/Rhythm; Drop D [Bass]	Hit Singles 4 4-Song Pack		February 16, 2016	
"Dead!"	My Chemical Romance	2006	E Standard	My Chemical Romance II 5-Song Pack		February 23, 2016	
"Famous Last Words"	My Chemical Romance	2006	E Standard	My Chemical Romance II 5-Song Pack		February 23, 2016	
"Helena"	My Chemical Romance	2004	E Standard	My Chemical Romance II 5-Song Pack		February 23, 2016	
"I'm Not Okay (I Promise)"	My Chemical Romance	2004	E Standard	My Chemical Romance II 5-Song Pack		February 23, 2016	
"Teenagers"	My Chemical Romance	2007	E Standard	My Chemical Romance II 5-Song Pack		February 23, 2016	
"A Knife In The Dark"	Howard Shore	2005	Drop D	Rocksmith Goes to the Movies 5-Song Pack		March 1, 2016	
"Back to the Future"	Alan Silvestri	1985	E Standard	Rocksmith Goes to the Movies 5-Song Pack		March 1, 2016	
"Batman - Theme"	Danny Elfman	1989	E Standard / Alt. Lead	Rocksmith Goes to the Movies 5-Song Pack		March 1, 2016	
"Superman - Main Title"	John Williams	1978	E Standard	Rocksmith Goes to the Movies 5-Song Pack		March 1, 2016	
"Jurassic Park - Theme"	John Williams	1993	E Standard - Lead; Drop D - Rhythm/Bass	Rocksmith Goes to the Movies 5-Song Pack		March 1, 2016	
"Take It Off"	The Donnas	2002	E Standard	Women Who Rock 5-Song Pack		March 8, 2016	
"I'm So Sick"	Flyleaf	2006	Drop D	Women Who Rock 5-Song Pack		March 8, 2016	
"Celebrity Skin"	Hole	1998	E Standard	Women Who Rock 5-Song Pack		March 8, 2016	
"Heaven Knows"	The Pretty Reckless	2013	E Standard	Women Who Rock 5-Song Pack		March 8, 2016	
"Cherry Bomb"	The Runaways	1976	E Standard	Women Who Rock 5-Song Pack		March 8, 2016	
"December"	Collective Soul	1995	E Standard	Collective Soul 5-Song Pack		March 15, 2016	
"Gel"	Collective Soul	1995	E Standard	Collective Soul 5-Song Pack		March 15, 2016	
"Heavy"	Collective Soul	1999	E♭ Standard	Collective Soul 5-Song Pack		March 15, 2016	
"Shine"	Collective Soul	1992	E♭ Drop D♭ - Lead/Bass; E♭ Standard [Rhythm]	Collective Soul 5-Song Pack		March 15, 2016	
"The World I Know"	Collective Soul	1995	E Standard	Collective Soul 5-Song Pack		March 15, 2016	
"Demons"	Imagine Dragons	2013	E♭ Standard	Imagine Dragons 3-Song Pack		March 22, 2016	
"It's Time"	Imagine Dragons	2012	E Standard	Imagine Dragons 3-Song Pack		March 22, 2016	
"Radioactive"	Imagine Dragons	2012	E Standard	Imagine Dragons 3-Song Pack		March 22, 2016	
"My Best Friend's Girl"	The Cars	1978	E Standard	Hit Singles V 4-Song Pack		March 29, 2016	
"Free Ride"	Edgar Winter	1972	E Standard	Hit Singles V 4-Song Pack		March 29, 2016	
"The Reason"	Hoobastank	2003	E Standard	Hit Singles V 4-Song Pack		March 29, 2016	
"Summertime Blues"	Eddie Cochran	1958	E Standard	Hit Singles V 4-Song Pack		March 29, 2016	
"Stillborn"	Black Label Society	2003	E♭ Standard	Black Label Society Song Pack		April 5, 2016	
"Suicide Messiah"	Black Label Society	2005	D Drop C	Black Label Society Song Pack		April 5, 2016	
"Overlord"	Black Label Society	2010	D Standard	Black Label Society Song Pack		April 5, 2016	
"Indestructible"	Disturbed	2008	Drop C	Disturbed Song Pack II		April 12, 2016	
"Inside the Fire"	Disturbed	2008	Drop C	Disturbed Song Pack II		April 12, 2016	
"The Night"	Disturbed	2008	Drop C	Disturbed Song Pack II		April 12, 2016	
"Stricken"	Disturbed	2005	Drop C	Disturbed Song Pack II		April 12, 2016	
"Ten Thousand Fists"	Disturbed	2005	E♭ Drop D♭	Disturbed Song Pack II		April 12, 2016	
"Girl U Want"	Devo	1980	E Standard	80's Mix Pack		April 19, 2016	
"Play with Me"	Extreme	1989	E♭ Standard	80's Mix Pack		April 19, 2016	
"Electric Eye"	Judas Priest	1982	E Standard	80's Mix Pack		April 19, 2016	
"Legend of the Spaceborne Killer"	Crobot	2014	E♭ Drop D♭	Crobot 3-Song Pack		April 26, 2016	
"Fly on the Wall"	Crobot	2014	E♭ Standard	Crobot 3-Song Pack		April 26, 2016	
"Nowhere to Hide"	Crobot	2014	E♭ Standard	Crobot 3-Song Pack		April 26, 2016	
"Audience of One"	Rise Against	2008	E♭ Standard	Rise Against II Song Pack		May 3, 2016	
"Help Is on the Way"	Rise Against	2011	E♭ Standard	Rise Against II Song Pack		May 3, 2016	
"Paper Wings"	Rise Against	2004	E♭ Standard	Rise Against II Song Pack		May 3, 2016	
"Ready to Fall"	Rise Against	2006	E♭ Standard	Rise Against II Song Pack		May 3, 2016	
"Re-Education (Through Labor)"	Rise Against	2008	E♭ Standard	Rise Against II Song Pack		May 3, 2016	
"Nemesis"	Arch Enemy	2005	C Standard	Variety Song Pack I		May 10, 2016	
"Hair of the Dog"	Nazareth	1975	E Standard	Variety Song Pack I		May 10, 2016	
"Little Talks"	Of Monsters and Men	2011	E Standard - Lead/Rhythm/Bass; Capo Required [Alt. Lead/Alt. Rhythm]	Variety Song Pack I		May 10, 2016	
"Peaches"	The Presidents of the United States of America	1995	E♭ Drop D♭	Variety Song Pack I		May 10, 2016	
"Jet City Woman"	Queensrÿche	1990	E Standard	Queensrÿche Song Pack		May 17, 2016	
"Eyes of a Stranger"	Queensrÿche	1988	E Standard - Lead/Rhythm; Drop D -Bass	Queensrÿche Song Pack		May 17, 2016	
"I Don't Believe in Love"	Queensrÿche	1988	Drop D	Queensrÿche Song Pack		May 17, 2016	
"The Red"	Chevelle	2002	C♯ Standard	Chevelle Song Pack		May 24, 2016	
"Hats Off to the Bull"	Chevelle	2011	D Drop C	Chevelle Song Pack		May 24, 2016	
"Vitamin R (Leading Us Along)"	Chevelle	2004	C♯ Drop B - Lead/Rhythm; Drop D - Bass	Chevelle Song Pack		May 24, 2016	
"Santa Monica"	Everclear	1995	E Standard	90s Mix Song Pack		May 31, 2016	
"Hey Man Nice Shot"	Filter	1995	Drop D	90s Mix Song Pack		May 31, 2016	
"Beer"	Reel Big Fish	1995	E Standard	90s Mix Song Pack		May 31, 2016	
"The Anthem"	Good Charlotte	2002	E♭ Standard/E♭ Drop D♭ (Rhythm)	Good Charlotte Song Pack		June 7, 2016	
"Girls & Boys"	Good Charlotte	2002	E♭ Standard	Good Charlotte Song Pack		June 7, 2016	
"I Just Wanna Live"	Good Charlotte	2004	E♭ Standard	Good Charlotte Song Pack		June 7, 2016	
"Lifestyles of the Rich and Famous"	Good Charlotte	2002	E♭ Drop D♭	Good Charlotte Song Pack		June 7, 2016	
"The River"	Good Charlotte	2007	E♭ Standard	Good Charlotte Song Pack		June 7, 2016	
"Save Tonight"	Eagle-Eye Cherry	1997	E Standard	Variety Song Pack II		June 14, 2016	
"The Gambler"	Kenny Rogers	1978	Capo Required [Lead/Alt. Lead/Rhythm]; E Standard - Bass	Variety Song Pack II		June 14, 2016	
"Under Pressure"	Queen and David Bowie	1982	E Standard	Variety Song Pack II		June 14, 2016	
"Right Now"	SR-71	2000	E♭ Standard	Variety Song Pack II		June 14, 2016	
"Drive"	Incubus	1999	E Standard	Incubus Pack II		June 21, 2016	
"Megalomaniac"	Incubus	2004	E Standard	Incubus Pack II		June 21, 2016	
"Pardon Me"	Incubus	1999	E Standard	Incubus Pack II		June 21, 2016	
"Stellar"	Incubus	1999	E Standard	Incubus Pack II		June 21, 2016	
"The Star-Spangled Banner/4th of July Reprise"	Boston	1994	E Standard	Independence Day Song Pack		June 28, 2016	
"Only in America"	Brooks & Dunn	2001	E Standard	Independence Day Song Pack		June 28, 2016	
"American Pie"	Don McLean	1971	E Standard	Independence Day Song Pack		June 28, 2016	
"Living in America"	James Brown	1986	E Standard	Independence Day Song Pack		June 28, 2016	
"Thrash Unreal"	Against Me!	2007	E Standard	2000s Mix Pack		July 5, 2016	
"Selkies: The Endless Obsession"	Between the Buried and Me	2005	C♯ Standard	2000s Mix Pack		July 5, 2016	
"Nine in the Afternoon"	Panic! at the Disco	2008	D Standard	2000s Mix Pack		July 5, 2016	
"Again"	Flyleaf	2009	D Standard [Lead]/Drop C [Rhythm]/Drop D [Bass]	Flyleaf Song Pack		July 12, 2016	
"Cassie"	Flyleaf	2005	Drop D	Flyleaf Song Pack		July 12, 2016	
"Fully Alive"	Flyleaf	2005	Drop D	Flyleaf Song Pack		July 12, 2016	
"Missing"	Flyleaf	2009	Drop C	Flyleaf Song Pack		July 12, 2016	
"Love Me Two Times"	The Doors	1967	E Standard: A446	60s Mix Pack		July 19, 2016	
"White Rabbit"	Jefferson Airplane	1967	E Standard	60s Mix Pack		July 19, 2016	
"Venus"	Shocking Blue	1969	E Standard	60s Mix Pack		July 19, 2016	
"Debaser"	Pixies	1989	E Standard	Pixies Song Pack		July 26, 2016	
"Hey"	Pixies	1989	E Standard	Pixies Song Pack		July 26, 2016	
"Monkey Gone to Heaven"	Pixies	1989	E Standard	Pixies Song Pack		July 26, 2016	
"Wave of Mutilation"	Pixies	1989	E Standard	Pixies Song Pack		July 26, 2016	
"Chelsea Dagger"	The Fratellis	2006	E Standard	Variety Song Pack III		August 2, 2016	
"Always with Me, Always with You"	Joe Satriani	1987	E Standard	Variety Song Pack III		August 2, 2016	
"Blue Collar Man (Long Nights)"	Styx	1978	E Standard	Variety Song Pack III		August 2, 2016	
"5 Minutes Alone"	Pantera	1994	D Standard	Variety Song Pack III		August 2, 2016	
"21st Century (Digital Boy)"	Bad Religion	1990	E Standard	Bad Religion Song Pack		August 9, 2016	
"Sorrow"	Bad Religion	2001	E Standard	Bad Religion Song Pack		August 9, 2016	
"American Jesus"	Bad Religion	1993	E Standard	Bad Religion Song Pack		August 9, 2016	
"Infected"	Bad Religion	1994	D Standard	Bad Religion Song Pack		August 9, 2016	
"My Songs Know What You Did in the Dark (Light Em Up)"	Fall Out Boy	2013	E Standard	2010s Mix Song Pack		August 16, 2016	
"Burn Nice and Slow (The Formative Years)"	Hail the Sun	2016	E Standard	2010s Mix Song Pack		August 16, 2016	
"Sweater Weather"	The Neighbourhood	2011	D Standard	2010s Mix Song Pack		August 16, 2016	
"Closer to the Heart"	Rush	1977	E Standard	Rush Song Pack II		August 23, 2016	
"Fly by Night"	Rush	1975	E Standard	Rush Song Pack II		August 23, 2016	
"Freewill"	Rush	1980	E Standard	Rush Song Pack II		August 23, 2016	
"Working Man"	Rush	1974	E Standard	Rush Song Pack II		August 23, 2016	
"La Villa Strangiato"	Rush	1978	E Standard	Rush Song Pack II		August 23, 2016	
"I Fought the Law"	The Clash	1979	E Standard	70s Mix Song Pack		August 30, 2016	
"Emerald"	Thin Lizzy	1976	E♭ Standard	70s Mix Song Pack		August 30, 2016	
"Little Green Bag"	George Baker Selection	1970	E Standard	70s Mix Song Pack		August 30, 2016	
"It's Been Awhile	Staind	2001	E♭ Drop D♭ [Lead]/E♭ Standard [Rhythm, Bass]/Custom (A♭D♭A♭D♭G♭B♭) [Alt Lead, Rhythm]	Staind Song Pack		September 6, 2016	
"Outside"	Staind	2001	E♭ Drop D♭ Lead/E♭ Standard [Rhythm]/C♯ Standard [Bass]/Custom (A♭D♭A♭D♭G♭B♭) [Alt Lead]	Staind Song Pack		September 6, 2016	
"So Far Away"	Staind	2003	Custom (E♭A♭D♭E♭A♭E♭) [Lead]/E♭ Standard [Rhythm, Bass]/Custom (A♭D♭A♭D♭E♭A♭) [Alt Lead, Rhythm]	Staind Song Pack		September 6, 2016	
"I'm Made of Wax, Larry, What are You Made Of?"	A Day To Remember	2009	Drop C	Variety Song Pack IV		September 13, 2016	
"I Ran (So Far Away)"	A Flock of Seagulls	1982	E Standard	Variety Song Pack IV		September 13, 2016	
"Never Going Back Again"	Fleetwood Mac	1977	Capo Required [Lead]/E♭ Standard [Rhythm]	Variety Song Pack IV		September 13, 2016	
"Refuse/Resist"	Sepultura	1993	D Standard	Variety Song Pack IV		September 13, 2016	
"Die, Die My Darling"	Misfits	1983	E Standard	The Misfits Song Pack		September 20, 2016	
"Halloween"	Misfits	1981	E Standard	The Misfits Song Pack		September 20, 2016	
"Last Caress"	Misfits	1980	E Standard	The Misfits Song Pack		September 20, 2016	
"Where Eagles Dare"	Misfits	1979	E Standard	The Misfits Song Pack		September 20, 2016	
"Metropolis—Part I: "The Miracle and the Sleeper""	Dream Theater	1992	E Standard	Dream Theater Song Pack		September 27, 2016	
"On the Backs of Angels"	Dream Theater	2011	E Standard	Dream Theater Song Pack		September 27, 2016	
"Pull Me Under"	Dream Theater	1992	E Standard	Dream Theater Song Pack		September 27, 2016	
"Three Little Birds"	Bob Marley and the Wailers	1977	E Standard	Anniversary Song Pack		October 4, 2016	
"Suspicious Minds"	Elvis Presley	1969	E Standard	Anniversary Song Pack		October 4, 2016	
"Some Nights"	fun.	2012	E Standard	Anniversary Song Pack		October 4, 2016	
"I Want You Back"	The Jackson 5	1969	E Standard	Anniversary Song Pack		October 4, 2016	
"Hey Ya!"	OutKast	2003	E Standard	Anniversary Song Pack		October 4, 2016	
"Drops of Jupiter"	Train	2001	E Standard	Anniversary Song Pack		October 4, 2016	
"Cold"	Crossfade	2004	Drop D - Lead/Rhythm; D Standard: Bass	2000s Mix Pack II		October 11, 2016	
"Simple Man"	Shinedown	2004	E Standard	2000s Mix Pack II		October 11, 2016	
"How to Save a Life"	The Fray	2005	E Standard	2000s Mix Pack II		October 11, 2016	
"Owner of a Lonely Heart"	Yes	1983	E Standard	Yes Song Pack		October 18, 2016	
"I've Seen All Good People"	Yes	1971	E Standard	Yes Song Pack		October 18, 2016	
"Heart of the Sunrise"	Yes	1971	E Standard	Yes Song Pack		October 18, 2016	
"Starship Trooper	Yes	1971	E Standard	Yes Song Pack		October 18, 2016	
"Roundabout"	Yes	1971	E Standard	Yes Song Pack		October 18, 2016	
"Black Sunshine"	White Zombie	1992	E Standard	Zombie Song Pack		October 25, 2016	
"Dragula"	Rob Zombie	1998	D Drop C	Zombie Song Pack		October 25, 2016	
"Living Dead Girl"	Rob Zombie	1998	Drop D	Zombie Song Pack		October 25, 2016	
"Superbeast"	Rob Zombie	1998	Custom Tuning: C# Drop B - Lead/Rhythm; E Standard - Bass	Zombie Song Pack		October 25, 2016	
"Sex And Candy"	Marcy Playground	1997	E Standard	Variety Pack V		November 1, 2016	
"Search And Destroy"	Iggy and The Stooges	1973	E Standard	Variety Pack V		November 1, 2016	
"The Ballad Of Mona Lisa"	Panic! At The Disco	2011	E Standard	Variety Pack V		November 1, 2016	
"Eyes Of A Panther"	Steel Panther	2009	E♭ Standard	Variety Pack V		November 1, 2016	
"Danger Zone"	Kenny Loggins	1986	E♭ Standard - Lead/Rhythm; E Standard - Bass	UBI30: 1986 Song Pack		November 8, 2016	
"Addicted To Love"	Robert Palmer	1986	E Standard	UBI30: 1986 Song Pack		November 8, 2016	
"Nobody's Fool"	Cinderella	1986	E Standard	UBI30: 1986 Song Pack		November 8, 2016	
"Burning Heart"	Survivor	1986	E Standard	UBI30: 1986 Song Pack		November 8, 2016	
"Talk Dirty to Me"	Poison	1986	E♭ Standard - Lead/Rhythm; E♭ Drop D♭ - Bass	UBI30: 1986 Song Pack		November 8, 2016	
"Pride and Joy"	Stevie Ray Vaughan & Double Trouble	1983	E♭ Standard	Stevie Ray Vaughan & DT Song Pack		November 15, 2016	
"Scuttle Buttin"	Stevie Ray Vaughan & Double Trouble	1984	E♭ Standard	Stevie Ray Vaughan & DT Song Pack		November 15, 2016	
"Cold Shot"	Stevie Ray Vaughan & Double Trouble	1984	E♭ Standard	Stevie Ray Vaughan & DT Song Pack		November 15, 2016	
"Couldn't Stand the Weather"	Stevie Ray Vaughan & Double Trouble	1984	E♭ Standard	Stevie Ray Vaughan & DT Song Pack		November 15, 2016	
"Texas Flood"	Stevie Ray Vaughan & Double Trouble	1983	E♭ Standard	Stevie Ray Vaughan & DT Song Pack		November 15, 2016	
"Shut Up And Dance"	Walk The Moon	2014	E Standard	2010s Mix Song Pack II		November 22, 2016	
"In The End"	Black Veil Brides	2012	E♭ Drop D♭	2010s Mix Song Pack II		November 22, 2016	
"Sail"	Awolnation	2011	E Standard	2010s Mix Song Pack II		November 22, 2016	
"Semi-Charmed Life"	Third Eye Blind	1997	E Standard	Third Eye Blind Pack		November 29, 2016	
"Never Let You Go"	Third Eye Blind	2000	E Standard	Third Eye Blind Pack		November 29, 2016	
"How's It Going To Be"	Third Eye Blind	1997	E Standard	Third Eye Blind Pack		November 29, 2016	
"Jumper"	Third Eye Blind	1998	E Standard	Third Eye Blind Pack		November 29, 2016	
"Suffragette City"	David Bowie	1972	E Standard	Variety Pack VI		December 6, 2016	
"Stray Cat Strut"	Brian Setzer	1981	E Standard	Variety Pack VI		December 6, 2016	
"F.C.P.R.E.M.I.X."	The Fall Of Troy	2005	E Standard	Variety Pack VI		December 6, 2016	
"Hey Jealousy"	Gin Blossoms	1993	E Standard	Variety Pack VI		December 6, 2016	
"Proud Mary"	Creedence Clearwater Revival	1969	D Standard - Lead; E Standard - Rhythm/Bass	Creedence Clearwater Revival		December 13, 2016	
"Fortunate Son"	Creedence Clearwater Revival	1969	D Standard - Lead; E Standard - Rhythm/Bass	Creedence Clearwater Revival		December 13, 2016	
"Bad Moon Rising"	Creedence Clearwater Revival	1969	D Standard - Lead; E Standard - Rhythm/Bass	Creedence Clearwater Revival		December 13, 2016	
"21 Guns"	Green Day	2009	E Standard	Green Day II		December 20, 2016	
"Bang Bang"	Green Day	2016	E Standard	Green Day II		December 20, 2016	
"Good Riddance (Time of Your Life)"	Green Day	1997	E Standard	Green Day II		December 20, 2016	
"Longview"	Green Day	1994	E♭ Standard	Green Day II		December 20, 2016	
"Wake Me Up When September Ends"	Green Day	2005	E Standard	Green Day II		December 20, 2016	
"Vertigo"	U2	2004	E Standard	U2 Pack		January 3, 2017	
"Beautiful Day"	U2	2000	E Standard	U2 Pack		January 3, 2017	
"Where the Streets Have No Name"	U2	1987	E Standard	U2 Pack		January 3, 2017	
"With or Without You"	U2	1987	E Standard - Lead/Alt. Lead/Rhythm/Bass; Drop D - Alt. Bass	U2 Pack		January 3, 2017	
"Sunday Bloody Sunday"	U2	1983	E♭ Standard	U2 Pack		January 3, 2017	
"California Dreamin"	The Mamas & the Papas	1966	E Standard	60s Mix II		January 10, 2017	
"Green Onions"	Booker T. & the M.G.'s	1962	E Standard	60s Mix II		January 10, 2017	
"Somebody To Love"	Jefferson Airplane	1967	E Standard	60s Mix II		January 10, 2017	
"First Date"	Blink-182	2001	E Standard	Blink-182 II		January 17, 2017	
"The Rock Show"	Blink-182	2001	E Standard	Blink-182 II		January 17, 2017	
"Adam's Song"	Blink-182	1999	D Standard - Lead/Rhythm/Alt. Rhythm; E Standard - Bass	Blink-182 II		January 17, 2017	
"Feeling This"	Blink-182	2003	Capo Required: Drop D - Lead/Rhythm/Alt. Bass; E Standard - Bass	Blink-182 II		January 17, 2017	
"I Miss You"	Blink-182	2003	Capo Required: E Standard	Blink-182 II		January 17, 2017	
"Counting Stars"	OneRepublic	2013	E Standard	Variety Pack VII		January 24, 2017	
"I Melt With You"	Modern English	1982	E Standard	Variety Pack VII		January 24, 2017	
"Wherever You Will Go"	The Calling	2001	E Standard - Lead/Bass; Capo Required – Alt Lead/Rhythm	Variety Pack VII		January 24, 2017	
"Take The Power Back"	Rage Against the Machine	1992	Drop D	Variety Pack VII		January 24, 2017	
"Going Under"	Evanescence	2003	E Standard	Evanescence Pack		January 31, 2017	
"My Immortal"	Evanescence	2003	E Standard	Evanescence Pack		January 31, 2017	
"Everybody's Fool"	Evanescence	2003	DADGAD - Lead/Rhythm; Drop D [Bass]	Evanescence Pack		January 31, 2017	
"Footloose"	Kenny Loggins	1984	E Standard	80s Mix Pack II		February 7, 2017	
"I Wanna Rock"	Twisted Sister	1984	E Standard	80s Mix Pack II		February 7, 2017	
"Don't You (Forget About Me)"	Simple Minds	1985	E Standard	80s Mix Pack II		February 7, 2017	
"Yellow"	Coldplay	2000	E Standard - Lead/Bass; Custom: EABGBd♯ - Rhythm	Coldplay Pack		February 14, 2017	
"Clocks"	Coldplay	2002	E Standard	Coldplay Pack		February 14, 2017	
"Viva La Vida"	Coldplay	2008	E Standard - Lead/Alt. Lead/Rhythm; E♭ Standard – Bass; Capo Required – Alt Rhythm	Coldplay Pack		February 14, 2017	
"Fix You"	Coldplay	2005	E Standard - Lead/Bass/Alt. Lead; Custom: EABGBd♯ - Rhythm	Coldplay Pack		February 14, 2017	
"In My Place"	Coldplay	2002	E Standard - Lead/Bass; Capo Required - Rhythm	Coldplay Pack		February 14, 2017	
"The Scientist"	Coldplay	2002	E Standard - Lead/Bass; Capo Required – Alt Lead; Custom: EADGCf - Rhythm	Coldplay Pack		February 14, 2017	
"Fight for Your Right"	Beastie Boys	1986	E♭ Standard	Beastie Boys Pack		February 21, 2017	
"No Sleep till Brooklyn"	Beastie Boys	1987	E♭ Standard	Beastie Boys Pack		February 21, 2017	
"Sabotage"	Beastie Boys	1994	E Standard	Beastie Boys Pack		February 21, 2017	
"Magic Carpet Ride"	Steppenwolf	1968	E Standard	Variety Pack VIII		February 28, 2017	
"Far Behind"	Candlebox	1993	E Standard	Variety Pack VIII		February 28, 2017	
"Underdog"	Kasabian	2009	E Standard	Variety Pack VIII		February 28, 2017	
"Everybody Wants To Rule The World"	Tears For Fears	1985	E Standard – Lead; Drop D – Rhythm/Bass	Variety Pack VIII		February 28, 2017	
"My Happy Ending"	Avril Lavigne	2004	E Standard	Avril Lavigne Pack		March 7, 2017	
"When You're Gone"	Avril Lavigne	2007	E Standard	Avril Lavigne Pack		March 7, 2017	
"Complicated"	Avril Lavigne	2002	E Standard - Lead/Alt. Lead; D Standard - Rhythm; Drop D - Bass	Avril Lavigne Pack		March 7, 2017	
"I'm With You"	Avril Lavigne	2002	E Standard - Lead/Rhythm; Drop D - Bass	Avril Lavigne Pack		March 7, 2017	
"Sk8er Boi"	Avril Lavigne	2002	Drop D	Avril Lavigne Pack		March 7, 2017	
"Inside Out"	Eve 6	1998	E Standard	90s Mix II		March 14, 2017	
"Violet"	Hole	1994	E Standard	90s Mix II		March 14, 2017	
"If You Could Only See"	Tonic	1996	Capo Required – Lead/Rhythm; E♭ Standard - Bass	90s Mix II		March 14, 2017	
"18 and Life"	Skid Row	1989	E Standard	Skid Row Pack		March 21, 2017	
"I Remember You"	Skid Row	1989	E Standard	Skid Row Pack		March 21, 2017	
"Monkey Business"	Skid Row	1991	E Standard	Skid Row Pack		March 21, 2017	
"Slave to the Grind"	Skid Row	1991	Drop D	Skid Row Pack		March 21, 2017	
"Youth Gone Wild"	Skid Row	1989	E Standard - Lead/Rhythm; Drop D - Bass	Skid Row Pack		March 21, 2017	
"You"	Bad Religion	1989	E Standard	Skater Rock Pack		March 28, 2017	
"Superman"	Goldfinger	1997	E Standard	Skater Rock Pack		March 28, 2017	
"May 16"	Lagwagon	1998	E Standard	Skater Rock Pack		March 28, 2017	
"No Cigar"	Millencolin	2000	E Standard	Skater Rock Pack		March 28, 2017	
"When Worlds Collide"	Powerman 5000	1999	E♭ Drop D♭	Skater Rock Pack		March 28, 2017	
"Even Flow"	Pearl Jam	1991	E Standard – Lead; Drop D - Rhythm/Bass; Open D – Alt Rhythm	Pearl Jam II		April 4, 2017	
"Rearviewmirror"	Pearl Jam	1993	E Standard	Pearl Jam II		April 4, 2017	
"Do The Evolution"	Pearl Jam	1998	E Standard	Pearl Jam II		April 4, 2017	
"Last Exit"	Pearl Jam	1994	E Standard	Pearl Jam II		April 4, 2017	
"Yellow Ledbetter"	Pearl Jam	1992	E Standard	Pearl Jam II		April 4, 2017	
"Banana Pancakes"	Jack Johnson	2005	E Standard	Variety Pack IX		April 11, 2017	
"All Mixed Up"	311	1995	E Standard	Variety Pack IX		April 11, 2017	
"Surfing With The Alien"	Joe Satriani	1987	E Standard	Variety Pack IX		April 11, 2017	
"Let It Go"	James Bay	2015	D Standard – Lead/Rhythm; C♯ Standard - Bass	Variety Pack IX		April 11, 2017	
"Buffalo Soldier"	Bob Marley and the Wailers	1983	E Standard	Bob Marley and the Wailers Pack		April 18, 2017	
"Could You Be Loved"	Bob Marley and the Wailers	1980	E Standard - Lead/Rhythm/Bass; Drop D - Alt. Lead	Bob Marley and the Wailers Pack		April 18, 2017	
"Is This Love"	Bob Marley and the Wailers	1978	E Standard	Bob Marley and the Wailers Pack		April 18, 2017	
"No Woman, No Cry"	Bob Marley and the Wailers	1975	E Standard	Bob Marley and the Wailers Pack		April 18, 2017	
"Redemption Song"	Bob Marley and the Wailers	1980	E Standard	Bob Marley and the Wailers Pack		April 18, 2017	
"Figure It Out"	Royal Blood	2014	E Standard	Royal Blood Pack		April 25, 2017	
"Little Monster"	Royal Blood	2014	E Standard - Lead; C Standard - Bass/Rhythm/Alt. Lead/Alt. Bass	Royal Blood Pack		April 25, 2017	
"Out of the Black"	Royal Blood	2014	D Standard	Royal Blood Pack		April 25, 2017	
"Hooked on a Feeling"	Blue Swede	1968	E Standard	Mix Tape Song Pack		May 2, 2017	
"Moonage Daydream"	David Bowie	1972	E Standard	Mix Tape Song Pack		May 2, 2017	
"Ain't No Mountain High Enough"	Marvin Gaye & Tammi Terrell	1967	E Standard	Mix Tape Song Pack		May 2, 2017	
"Go All the Way"	Raspberries	1972	E Standard	Mix Tape Song Pack		May 2, 2017	
"Come and Get Your Love"	Redbone	1974	E Standard	Mix Tape Song Pack		May 2, 2017	
"If It Makes You Happy"	Sheryl Crow	1996	E Standard	Sheryl Crow Pack		May 9, 2017	
"My Favorite Mistake"	Sheryl Crow	1998	E Standard	Sheryl Crow Pack		May 9, 2017	
"Soak Up the Sun"	Sheryl Crow	2002	E Standard	Sheryl Crow Pack		May 9, 2017	
"Casey Jones"	Grateful Dead	1970	E Standard	Grateful Dead Pack		May 16, 2017	
"Friend of the Devil"	Grateful Dead	1970	E Standard	Grateful Dead Pack		May 16, 2017	
"Sugar Magnolia"	Grateful Dead	1970	E Standard	Grateful Dead Pack		May 16, 2017	
"Truckin'"	Grateful Dead	1970	E Standard	Grateful Dead Pack		May 16, 2017	
"Uncle John's Band"	Grateful Dead	1970	E Standard	Grateful Dead Pack		May 16, 2017	
"Rise Above"	Black Flag	1981	E Standard	80s Mix III		May 23, 2017	
"I Want It All"	Queen	1989	E Standard	80s Mix III		May 23, 2017	
"Take It on the Run"	REO Speedwagon	1981	E Standard	80s Mix III		May 23, 2017	
"All Downhill from Here"	New Found Glory	2004	E Standard	New Found Glory Pack		May 30, 2017	
"Hit or Miss"	New Found Glory	2000	E Standard	New Found Glory Pack		May 30, 2017	
"My Friends Over You"	New Found Glory	2002	E Standard	New Found Glory Pack		May 30, 2017	
"Surfin' U.S.A."	The Beach Boys	1963	E Standard	Surf Rock II		June 6, 2017	
"Pipeline"	The Chantays	1963	E Standard	Surf Rock II		June 6, 2017	
"Surf Rider"	The Lively Ones	1963	E Standard	Surf Rock II		June 6, 2017	
"Penetration"	The Pyramids	1963	E Standard	Surf Rock II		June 6, 2017	
"All Over You"	Live	1994	E♭ Standard	Live Pack		June 13, 2017	
"The Dolphin's Cry"	Live	1999	E♭ Standard	Live Pack		June 13, 2017	
"I Alone"	Live	1994	E♭ Standard	Live Pack		June 13, 2017	
"Lightning Crashes"	Live	1994	E♭ Standard	Live Pack		June 13, 2017	
"Selling the Drama"	Live	1994	E♭ Standard	Live Pack		June 13, 2017	
"Bad Things"	Jace Everett	2005	E Standard	Variety Pack X		June 20, 2017	
"Lick It Up"	Kiss	1983	E Standard	Variety Pack X		June 20, 2017	
"Mouth for War"	Pantera	1991	E Standard	Variety Pack X		June 20, 2017	
"Los Angeles"	X	1980	E Standard	Variety Pack X		June 20, 2017	
"Always Alright"	Alabama Shakes	2012	E Standard	Alabama Shakes Pack		June 27, 2017	
"Don't Wanna Fight"	Alabama Shakes	2015	E♭ Standard	Alabama Shakes Pack		June 27, 2017	
"Gimme All Your Love"	Alabama Shakes	2015	E Standard	Alabama Shakes Pack		June 27, 2017	
"Hold On"	Alabama Shakes	2012	E Standard	Alabama Shakes Pack		June 27, 2017	
"Time in a Bottle"	Jim Croce	1972	Capo Required (Lead); E Standard - Rhythm/Bass	70s Mix II		July 5, 2017	
"Do You Feel Like We Do"	Peter Frampton	1973	E Standard	70s Mix II		July 5, 2017	
"Cowboy Song"	Thin Lizzy	1976	E♭ Standard	70s Mix II		July 5, 2017	
"12:51"	The Strokes	2003	E Standard	The Strokes II		July 11, 2017	
"Someday"	The Strokes	2001	E Standard	The Strokes II		July 11, 2017	
"Taken for a Fool"	The Strokes	2011	E Standard - Lead/Rhythm; Drop D - Bass	The Strokes II		July 11, 2017	
"You Only Live Once"	The Strokes	2006	E Standard	The Strokes II		July 11, 2017	
"Little Miss Can't Be Wrong"	Spin Doctors	1992	E Standard	90s Mix III		July 18, 2017	
"Alright"	Supergrass	1995	E Standard	90s Mix III		July 18, 2017	
"Life Is a Highway"	Tom Cochrane	1991	E Standard	90s Mix III		July 18, 2017	
"The Beautiful People"	Marilyn Manson	1996	Drop D	Marilyn Manson Pack		July 25, 2017	
"Coma White"	Marilyn Manson	1999	Custom: EADGAe - Lead/Rhythm; E Standard - Bass	Marilyn Manson Pack		July 25, 2017	
"Tourniquet"	Marilyn Manson	1997	E Standard	Marilyn Manson Pack		July 25, 2017	
"Last Train to Clarksville"	The Monkees	1966	E Standard	The Monkees Pack		August 1, 2017	
"Pleasant Valley Sunday"	The Monkees	1967	E Standard	The Monkees Pack		August 1, 2017	
"Valleri"	The Monkees	1968	E Standard	The Monkees Pack		August 1, 2017	
"Can You Feel My Heart"	Bring Me the Horizon	2013	E Standard	2010s Mix III		August 8, 2017	
"45"	The Gaslight Anthem	2012	E♭ Standard	2010s Mix III		August 8, 2017	
"Let Her Go"	Passenger	2012	Capo Required (Lead); E Standard - Rhythm/Bass	2010s Mix III		August 8, 2017	
"Honey Bee"	Muddy Waters	1951	E Standard	Muddy Waters Pack		August 15, 2017	
"I Can't Be Satisfied"	Muddy Waters	1952	E Standard - Lead/Rhythm/Bass; Open G - Alt. Lead	Muddy Waters Pack		August 15, 2017	
"Mannish Boy"	Muddy Waters	1955	E Standard	Muddy Waters Pack		August 15, 2017	
"Still a Fool"	Muddy Waters	1951	E Standard	Muddy Waters Pack		August 15, 2017	
"Runnin' Wild"	Airbourne	2007	E Standard	Airbourne Pack		August 22, 2017	
"Too Much, Too Young, Too Fast"	Airbourne	2007	E Standard	Airbourne Pack		August 22, 2017	
"Blonde, Bad and Beautiful"	Airbourne	2010	E Standard	Airbourne Pack		August 22, 2017	
"Your Eyes"	Bombay Bicycle Club	2011	E Standard	Variety Pack XI		August 29, 2017	
"This War Is Ours (The Guillotine Part 2)"	Escape the Fate	2008	Drop C	Variety Pack XI		August 29, 2017	
"All My Ex's Live in Texas"	George Strait	1991	E Standard	Variety Pack XI		August 29, 2017	
"She Don't Use Jelly"	The Flaming Lips	1993	E Standard	Variety Pack XI		August 29, 2017	
"Away from the Sun"	3 Doors Down	2002	E Standard	3 Doors Down II		September 5, 2017	
"Be Like That"	3 Doors Down	2001	E Standard	3 Doors Down II		September 5, 2017	
"Here Without You"	3 Doors Down	2003	E♭ Standard - Lead/Rhythm; E Standard - Bass	3 Doors Down II		September 5, 2017	
"It's Not My Time"	3 Doors Down	2008	E Standard	3 Doors Down II		September 5, 2017	
"Let Me Go"	3 Doors Down	2005	E Standard	3 Doors Down II		September 5, 2017	
"Lay It Down"	Ratt	1985	Drop D	80s Mix IV		September 12, 2017	
"Hip to Be Square"	Huey Lewis and the News	1986	E Standard	80s Mix IV		September 12, 2017	
"Higher Love"	Steve Winwood	1986	E Standard	80s Mix IV		September 12, 2017	
"The Artist in the Ambulance"	Thrice	2003	Drop C	Thrice Pack		September 19, 2017	
"Stare At the Sun"	Thrice	2004	Drop C	Thrice Pack		September 19, 2017	
"Deadbolt"	Thrice	2002	E♭ Drop D♭	Thrice Pack		September 19, 2017	
"99 Red Balloons"	Goldfinger	2000	E Standard	Rockin' Covers Pack		September 26, 2017	
"Bad Romance"	Halestorm	2011	E♭ Drop D♭	Rockin' Covers Pack		September 26, 2017	
"Tainted Love"	Marilyn Manson	2001	E Standard	Rockin' Covers Pack		September 26, 2017	
"Careless Whisper"	Seether	2009	D Drop C	Rockin' Covers Pack		September 26, 2017	
"I Can't Help Myself (Sugar Pie Honey Bunch)"	Four Tops	1965	E Standard	Four Tops Pack		October 3, 2017	
"It's the Same Old Song"	Four Tops	1965	E Standard	Four Tops Pack		October 3, 2017	
"Reach Out I'll Be There"	Four Tops	1966	E Standard	Four Tops Pack		October 3, 2017	
"Bernadette"	Four Tops	1967	E Standard	Four Tops Pack		October 3, 2017	
"The Funeral"	Band of Horses	2006	E Standard - Lead/Rhythm; Capo required - Alt. Lead/Alt. Rhythm; E♭ Standard - Bass	2000s Mix III		October 10, 2017	
"Lips of an Angel"	Hinder	2005	Drop C	2000s Mix III		October 10, 2017	
"Breakaway"	Kelly Clarkson	2004	E Standard	2000s Mix III		October 10, 2017	
"Takin' Care of Business"	Bachman-Turner Overdrive	1973	E Standard	Bachman-Turner Overdrive Pack		October 17, 2017	
"Let It Ride"	Bachman-Turner Overdrive	1973	E Standard	Bachman-Turner Overdrive Pack		October 17, 2017	
"You Ain't Seen Nothing Yet"	Bachman-Turner Overdrive	1974	E Standard	Bachman-Turner Overdrive Pack		October 17, 2017	
"Down Under"	Colin Hay	2011	E Standard	Variety Pack XII		October 24, 2017	
"Through the Fire and Flames"	DragonForce	2005	E Standard	Variety Pack XII		October 24, 2017	
"Saturday Night's Alright for Fighting"	Elton John	1973	E Standard	Variety Pack XII		October 24, 2017	
"Send Me on My Way"	Rusted Root	1995	E Standard	Variety Pack XII		October 24, 2017	
"Twilight of the Thunder God"	Amon Amarth	2008	B Standard - Lead/Rhythm; E Standard - Bass	Amon Amarth Pack		October 31, 2017	
"The Pursuit of Vikings"	Amon Amarth	2004	B Standard - Lead/Rhythm; E Standard - Bass	Amon Amarth Pack		October 31, 2017	
"War of the Gods"	Amon Amarth	2011	B Standard - Lead/Rhythm; E Standard - Bass	Amon Amarth Pack		October 31, 2017	
"Death in Fire"	Amon Amarth	2002	B Standard - Lead/Rhythm; E Standard - Bass	Amon Amarth Pack		October 31, 2017	
"Guardians of Asgaard"	Amon Amarth	2008	B Drop A - Lead/Rhythm; E Standard - Bass	Amon Amarth Pack		October 31, 2017	
"Linoleum"	NOFX	1994	E Standard	NOFX Pack		November 7, 2017	
"Bob"	NOFX	1992	E Standard	NOFX Pack		November 7, 2017	
"Seeing Double At The Triple Rock"	NOFX	2006	E Standard	NOFX Pack		November 7, 2017	
"Stickin' In My Eye"	NOFX	1992	E Standard	NOFX Pack		November 7, 2017	
"Back on the Chain Gang"	The Pretenders	1982	E Standard	The Pretenders Pack		November 14, 2017	
"Brass in Pocket"	The Pretenders	1979	E Standard - Lead/Alt. Lead/Rhythm; Drop D - Bass	The Pretenders Pack		November 14, 2017	
"Don't Get Me Wrong"	The Pretenders	1986	E Standard	The Pretenders Pack		November 14, 2017	
"I'll Stand By You"	The Pretenders	1994	E Standard	The Pretenders Pack		November 14, 2017	
"Middle of the Road"	The Pretenders	1983	Drop D - Lead/Rhythm; E Standard - Bass/Alt. Rhythm	The Pretenders Pack		November 14, 2017	
"I Get Off"	Halestorm	2009	Drop D - Lead/Bass; E♭ Drop B - Rhythm	Halestorm Pack		November 22, 2017	
"I Miss the Misery"	Halestorm	2012	Drop D - Lead/Bass; E Standard - Rhythm	Halestorm Pack		November 22, 2017	
"Mz. Hyde"	Halestorm	2013	Drop D	Halestorm Pack		November 22, 2017	
"A Mad Russian's Christmas"	Trans-Siberian Orchestra	1996	E Standard	Trans-Siberian Orchestra Pack		November 28, 2017	
"Christmas Canon Rock"	Trans-Siberian Orchestra	2004	E Standard	Trans-Siberian Orchestra Pack		November 28, 2017	
"Christmas Eve/Sarajevo 12/24"	Trans-Siberian Orchestra	1996	E Standard	Trans-Siberian Orchestra Pack		November 28, 2017	
"O Come, All Ye Faithful/O Holy Night"	Trans-Siberian Orchestra	1996	E Standard	Trans-Siberian Orchestra Pack		November 28, 2017	
"Wizards in Winter"	Trans-Siberian Orchestra	2004	E Standard - Lead/Rhythm; Drop D - Bass	Trans-Siberian Orchestra Pack		November 28, 2017	
"Fly Like an Eagle"	Steve Miller Band	1976	E Standard	Steve Miller Band Pack		December 5, 2017	
"Jet Airliner"	Steve Miller Band	1977	Capo Required - Lead/Alt. Lead/Rhythm; E Standard - Bass	Steve Miller Band Pack		December 5, 2017	
"The Joker"	Steve Miller Band	1973	D Standard - Lead/Rhythm; E Standard - Bass	Steve Miller Band Pack		December 5, 2017	
"Rock'n Me"	Steve Miller Band	1976	E Standard	Steve Miller Band Pack		December 5, 2017	
"Take the Money and Run"	Steve Miller Band	1976	E Standard	Steve Miller Band Pack		December 5, 2017	
"Down in a Hole"	Alice in Chains	1992	E♭ Standard - Lead/Alt. Lead/Rhythm/Alt. Rhythm; E♭ Drop D♭ - Bass	Alice in Chains II		December 12, 2017	
"Heaven Beside You"	Alice in Chains	1995	E♭ Standard	Alice in Chains II		December 12, 2017	
"No Excuses"	Alice in Chains	1994	E♭ Standard	Alice in Chains II		December 12, 2017	
"Nutshell"	Alice in Chains	1994	E♭ Standard	Alice in Chains II		December 12, 2017	
"Rooster"	Alice in Chains	1992	E♭ Standard	Alice in Chains II		December 12, 2017	
"Big River"	Johnny Cash	1970	E Standard - Lead/Bass; Capo Required - Rhythm	Johnny Cash Song Pack I		December 19, 2017	
"Folsom Prison Blues"	Johnny Cash	1958	E Standard	Johnny Cash Song Pack I		December 19, 2017	
"Give My Love to Rose"	Johnny Cash	1957	Capo Required - Lead/Rhythm; E Standard - Bass	Johnny Cash Song Pack I		December 19, 2017	
"Hey, Porter"	Johnny Cash	1955	E Standard	Johnny Cash Song Pack I		December 19, 2017	
"Jackson"	Johnny Cash	1967	E Standard	Johnny Cash Song Pack I		December 19, 2017	
"Cry! Cry! Cry!"	Johnny Cash	1955	E Standard	Johnny Cash Song Pack II		December 19, 2017	
"Get Rhythm"	Johnny Cash	1956	E Standard - Lead/Alt. Rhythm/Bass; Capo Required - Rhythm	Johnny Cash Song Pack II		December 19, 2017	
"I Walk the Line"	Johnny Cash	1956	E Standard - Lead/Alt. Rhythm/Bass; Capo Required - Rhythm	Johnny Cash Song Pack II		December 19, 2017	
"Ring of Fire"	Johnny Cash	1963	E Standard	Johnny Cash Song Pack II		December 19, 2017	
"Sunday Mornin' Comin' Down"	Johnny Cash	1970	Capo Required - Lead/Rhythm; E Standard - Bass	Johnny Cash Song Pack II		December 19, 2017	
"Ain't It Fun"	Paramore	2014	Drop D - Lead/Rhythm; C♯ Standard - Bass	Paramore Pack		January 9, 2018	
"Brick by Boring Brick"	Paramore	2009	Drop D - Lead/Rhythm; C♯ Standard - Bass	Paramore Pack		January 9, 2018	
"Crushcrushcrush"	Paramore	2007	E♭ Drop D♭ - Lead/Rhythm; C♯ Standard - Bass	Paramore Pack		January 9, 2018	
"The Only Exception"	Paramore	2010	E Standard - Lead/Bass; Custom: EABGBd♯ - Rhythm	Paramore Pack		January 9, 2018	
"Pressure"	Paramore	2005	Drop D	Paramore Pack		January 9, 2018	
"Still Into You"	Paramore	2013	Drop D - Lead/Rhythm; C♯ Standard - Bass	Paramore Pack		January 9, 2018	
"Boulevard of Broken Dreams"	Green Day	2004	E Standard - Lead/Rhythm/Bass; Capo required - Alt. Rhythm	Green Day III		January 16, 2018	
"Jesus of Suburbia"	Green Day	2004	E Standard Lead/Bass; E♭ Standard Rhythm	Green Day III		January 16, 2018	
"Holiday"	Green Day	2004	E Standard	Green Day III		January 16, 2018	
"Know Your Enemy"	Green Day	2009	E Standard	Green Day III		January 16, 2018	
"Welcome to Paradise"	Green Day	1994	E♭ Standard	Green Day III		January 16, 2018	
"The Cave"	Mumford & Sons	2009	E Standard - Lead/Bass; Open D - Rhythm; Open E - Alt. Rhythm	Mumford & Sons Pack		January 23, 2018	
"I Will Wait"	Mumford & Sons	2012	E Standard - Bass; Capo Required - Lead; Open D♭/C♯ - Rhythm	Mumford & Sons Pack		January 23, 2018	
"Little Lion Man"	Mumford & Sons	2009	E Standard - Bass; EADBGD Capo Required - Lead; CACGCE Capo Required - Rhythm	Mumford & Sons Pack		January 23, 2018	
"Aqualung"	Jethro Tull	1971	E Standard - Lead/Rhythm/Alt. Lead/Alt. Rhythm; Capo required - Rhythm	70s Mix III		January 30, 2018	
"Radar Love"	Golden Earring	1973	E Standard	70s Mix III		January 30, 2018	
"We're an American Band"	Grand Funk Railroad	1973	E Standard	70s Mix III		January 30, 2018	
"Poker Face"	Lady Gaga	2008	E Standard	Lady Gaga Pack		February 6, 2018	
"Paparazzi"	Lady Gaga	2009	E Standard	Lady Gaga Pack		February 6, 2018	
"Bad Romance"	Lady Gaga	2009	E Standard	Lady Gaga Pack		February 6, 2018	
"You and I"	Lady Gaga	2011	E Standard - Lead/Rhythm; Drop D - Bass	Lady Gaga Pack		February 6, 2018	
"Built to Fall"	Trivium	2011	E♭ Drop D♭	Trivium Pack		February 13, 2018	
"In Waves"	Trivium	2011	E♭ Drop D♭	Trivium Pack		February 13, 2018	
"Strife"	Trivium	2013	E♭ Drop D♭	Trivium Pack		February 13, 2018	
"Only the Good Die Young"	Billy Joel	1978	E Standard	Variety Pack XIII		February 20, 2018	
"Bad To The Bone"	George Thorogood and the Destroyers	1982	Open G - Lead; E Standard - Rhythm/Bass	Variety Pack XIII		February 20, 2018	
"Face Down"	The Red Jumpsuit Apparatus	2006	Drop C	Variety Pack XIII		February 20, 2018	
"Runaway Train"	Soul Asylum	1993	E Standard	Variety Pack XIII		February 20, 2018	
"Games People Play"	Joe South	1960	Open G Capo required - Lead; E Standard - Rhythm/Bass	60s Mix III		February 27, 2018	
"Get Together"	The Youngbloods	1967	E Standard - Lead/Bass; E Standard Capo required - Rhythm	60s Mix III		February 27, 2018	
"Hush"	Deep Purple	1968	E Standard	60s Mix III		February 27, 2018	
"Man! I Feel Like A Woman"	Shania Twain	1997	Capo Required: E Standard – Lead/Rhythm; E♭ Standard - Bass	Shania Twain Pack		March 6, 2018	
"That Don't Impress Me Much"	Shania Twain	1997	Capo Required: E Standard – Lead/Rhythm; E Standard - Bass	Shania Twain Pack		March 6, 2018	
"You're Still The One"	Shania Twain	1997	E♭ Standard – Lead; E Standard - Bass; Capo Required: E Standard - Rhythm	Shania Twain Pack		March 6, 2018	
"Ruby"	Kaiser Chiefs	2007	E Standard	Kaiser Chiefs Pack		March 13, 2018	
"Never Miss A Beat"	Kaiser Chiefs	2008	E Standard	Kaiser Chiefs Pack		March 13, 2018	
"I Predict A Riot"	Kaiser Chiefs	2005	E Standard	Kaiser Chiefs Pack		March 13, 2018	
"Pompeii"	Bastille	2013	E Standard – Rhythm/Bass; Drop D - Lead	2010s Mix IV		March 20, 2018	
"What You Know"	Two Door Cinema Club	2010	E Standard – Lead/Bass; Capo Required - Rhythm	2010s Mix IV		March 20, 2018	
"Hold Back The River"	James Bay	2015	D Standard	2010s Mix IV		March 20, 2018	
"Lovefool"	The Cardigans	1996	E Standard	The Cardigans Pack		March 27, 2018	
"Erase/Rewind"	The Cardigans	1998	E Standard	The Cardigans Pack		March 27, 2018	
"My Favourite Game"	The Cardigans	1998	E Standard	The Cardigans Pack		March 27, 2018	
"Murmaider"	Dethklok	2007	C Standard	Dethklok II		April 3, 2018	
"Black Fire Upon Us"	Dethklok	2009	C Standard	Dethklok II		April 3, 2018	
"Bloodlines"	Dethklok	2009	C Standard	Dethklok II		April 3, 2018	
"Your Love"	The Outfield	1985	E Standard	Variety Pack XIV		April 10, 2018	
"Amie"	Pure Prairie League	1972	E Standard	Variety Pack XIV		April 10, 2018	
"Hunger Strike"	Temple Of The Dog	1991	Drop D	Variety Pack XIV		April 10, 2018	
"I Write Sins Not Tragedies"	Panic! At The Disco	2005	Drop D	Variety Pack XIV		April 10, 2018	
"Dakota"	Stereophonics	2005	Capo Required – Lead/Alt Lead/Rhythm; E Standard - Bass	Stereophonics Pack		April 17, 2018	
"The Bartender And The Thief"	Stereophonics	1999	Drop D – Lead/Rhythm; E Standard - Bass	Stereophonics Pack		April 17, 2018	
"Maybe Tomorrow"	Stereophonics	2003	E Standard	Stereophonics Pack		April 17, 2018	
"You Get What You Give"	New Radicals	1998	E Standard	90s Mix IV		April 24, 2018	
"Keep Away"	Godsmack	1998	Drop D	90s Mix IV		April 24, 2018	
"Volcano Girls"	Veruca Salt	1997	E Standard	90s Mix IV		April 24, 2018	
"Black Horse and the Cherry Tree"	KT Tunstall	2004	E Standard	KT Tunstall		May 1, 2018	
"Other Side Of The World"	KT Tunstall	2004	E Standard	KT Tunstall		May 1, 2018	
"Suddenly I See"	KT Tunstall	2004	E Standard	KT Tunstall		May 1, 2018	
"Lonely Is The Night"	Billy Squier	1981	E Standard	80s Mix V		May 8, 2018	
"Too Much Time on My Hands"	Styx	1981	E Standard	80s Mix V		May 8, 2018	
"Let's Groove"	Earth, Wind & Fire	1981	E Standard	80s Mix V		May 8, 2018	
"Obstacle 1"	Interpol	2002	E Standard – Lead/Rhythm; Drop D - Bass	Interpol Pack		May 15, 2018	
"All The Rage Back Home"	Interpol	2014	E Standard	Interpol Pack		May 15, 2018	
"PDA"	Interpol	2002	E Standard – Lead/Rhythm; Drop D - Bass	Interpol Pack		May 15, 2018	
"Evil"	Interpol	2004	E Standard – Lead/Rhythm; Drop D - Bass	Interpol Pack		May 15, 2018	
"Souls of Black"	Testament	1990	E Standard	Metal Mix		May 22, 2018	
"Transilvanian Hunger"	Darkthrone	1994	E Standard	Metal Mix		May 22, 2018	
"Immortal Rites"	Morbid Angel	1989	E♭ Standard	Metal Mix		May 22, 2018	
"Come Away With Me"	Norah Jones	2002	E Standard	Norah Jones Pack		May 29, 2018	
"Don't Know Why"	Norah Jones	2002	Capo Required – Lead/Alt Lead; E Standard – Rhythm/Bass	Norah Jones Pack		May 29, 2018	
"Sunrise"	Norah Jones	2004	Capo Required – Lead/Rhythm; E Standard – Bass	Norah Jones Pack		May 29, 2018	
"Baby Blue"	Badfinger	1971	E Standard	Variety Pack XV		June 5, 2018	
"Apache"	The Shadows	1960	E Standard	Variety Pack XV		June 5, 2018	
"In The Meantime"	Spacehog	1995	E Standard	Variety Pack XV		June 5, 2018	
"Bad"	U2	1984	E Standard	Variety Pack XV		June 5, 2018	
"Dashboard"	Modest Mouse	2007	E Standard	2000s Mix IV		June 12, 2018	
"Johnny, I Hardly Knew Ya"	Dropkick Murphys	2007	E Standard	2000s Mix IV		June 12, 2018	
"Bad Girlfriend"	Theory of a Deadman	2008	D Standard	2000s Mix IV		June 12, 2018	
"No Surprises"	Radiohead	1997	Capo Required – Lead/Rhythm; Standard – Bass	Radiohead II		June 19, 2018	
"Street Spirit (Fade Out)"	Radiohead	1995	E Standard – Lead/Bass; Capo Require – Rhythm	Radiohead II		June 19, 2018	
"There, There"	Radiohead	2003	E Standard – Lead/Bass; DBDGBE – Rhythm	Radiohead II		June 19, 2018	
"Bad Reputation"	Joan Jett	1981	E Standard	Joan Jett Pack		June 26, 2018	
"Crimson and Clover"	Joan Jett & the Blackhearts	1982	E Standard	Joan Jett Pack		June 26, 2018	
"I Hate Myself for Loving You"	Joan Jett & the Blackhearts	1988	E Standard	Joan Jett Pack		June 26, 2018	
"Ever Fallen In Love"	Buzzcocks	1978	E Standard	70s Mix IV		July 3, 2018	
"Who Do You Love"	George Thorogood and the Destroyers	1978	E Standard	70s Mix IV		July 3, 2018	
"Jungle Love"	Steve Miller Band	1977	E♭ Standard	70s Mix IV		July 3, 2018	
"It's Tricky"	Run-DMC	1987	E Standard - Lead; D Standard - Rhythm	Run-DMC Pack		July 10, 2018	
"King of Rock"	Run-DMC	1985	E Standard	Run-DMC Pack		July 10, 2018	
"Rock Box"	Run-DMC	1984	E Standard	Run-DMC Pack		July 10, 2018	
"Rebel Rouser"	Duane Eddy	1958	E Standard	Variety Pack XVI		July 17, 2018	
"Feeling Good"	Nina Simone	1962	E Standard	Variety Pack XVI		July 17, 2018	
"This Love"	Pantera	1992	E Standard	Variety Pack XVI		July 17, 2018	
"I'm Gonna Be (500 Miles)"	The Proclaimers	1988	E Standard	Variety Pack XVI		July 17, 2018	
"A Case Of You"	Joni Mitchell	1971	E♭ Standard - Lead; Capo Required - Rhythm; E Standard - Bass	Joni Mitchell Pack		July 24, 2018	
"Big Yellow Taxi"	Joni Mitchell	1970	Open E - Lead; E Standard - Alt Lead/Bass; Capo Required - Rhythm	Joni Mitchell Pack		July 24, 2018	
"Both Sides, Now"	Joni Mitchell	1969	E♭ Standard - Lead/Alt. Lead; Capo Required - Rhythm; E Standard - Bass	Joni Mitchell Pack		July 24, 2018	
"Strategy and Spying"	Billy Martin	2013	E Standard	Ubisoft Music Song Pack		July 31, 2018	
"Assassin's Creed IV Black Flag Main Theme"	Brian Tyler	2013	E Standard	Ubisoft Music Song Pack		July 31, 2018	
"Ezio's Family"	Jesper Kyd	2009	E Standard – Lead/Alt Rhythm; Drop D – Rhythm/Bass	Ubisoft Music Song Pack		July 31, 2018	
"Blood Dragon Theme (Far Cry 3: Blood Dragon)"	Power Glove	2013	E Standard	Ubisoft Music Song Pack		July 31, 2018	
"The Ballad of Clutch Nixon"	The Road Vikings	2018	E Standard – Bass; B Standard - Lead/Alt Lead/Rhythm	Ubisoft Music Song Pack		July 31, 2018	
"Black Smoke Rising"	Greta Van Fleet	2017	E Standard	Greta Van Fleet Pack		August 7, 2018	
"Highway Tune"	Greta Van Fleet	2017	E Standard	Greta Van Fleet Pack		August 7, 2018	
"Safari Song"	Greta Van Fleet	2017	E Standard	Greta Van Fleet Pack		August 7, 2018	
"One Bourbon, One Scotch, One Beer"	John Lee Hooker	1953	E Standard	Blues Song Pack II		August 14, 2018	
"West Coast Blues"	Wes Montgomery	1960	E Standard	Blues Song Pack II		August 14, 2018	
"Back Door Man"	Willie Dixon	1960	Open D	Blues Song Pack II		August 14, 2018	
"Bleeds No More"	Silverstein	2002	Drop D	Silverstein Song Pack		August 21, 2018	
"My Heroine"	Silverstein	2004	E Standard	Silverstein Song Pack		August 21, 2018	
"Smashed into Pieces"	Silverstein	2002	Drop D	Silverstein Song Pack		August 21, 2018	
"Smile In Your Sleep"	Silverstein	2005	E Standard	Silverstein Song Pack		August 21, 2018	
"Changes"	David Bowie	1971	E Standard	Variety Pack XVII		August 28, 2018	
"Movies"	Alien Ant Farm	1999	E Standard	Variety Pack XVII		August 28, 2018	
"Stay (I Missed You)"	Lisa Loeb	1994	E Standard – Bass; Capo Required - Lead/Rhythm	Variety Pack XVII		August 28, 2018	
"Touch Of Grey"	Grateful Dead	1987	E Standard	Variety Pack XVII		August 28, 2018	
"Since U Been Gone"	Kelly Clarkson	2004	E Standard	Kelly Clarkson Song Pack		September 4, 2018	
"Behind These Hazel Eyes"	Kelly Clarkson	2005	E Standard - Rhythm/Bass; Capo Required - Lead	Kelly Clarkson Song Pack		September 4, 2018	
"My Life Would Suck Without You"	Kelly Clarkson	2009	E Standard – Lead/Bass; Capo Required - Rhythm	Kelly Clarkson Song Pack		September 4, 2018	
"Unsung"	Helmet	1992	Drop D	90s Mix V		September 11, 2018	
"Summer Song"	Joe Satriani	1992	E Standard	90s Mix V		September 11, 2018	
"Christian Woman"	Type O Negative	1993	B Standard - Lead, Rhythm; E Standard - Bass	90s Mix V		September 11, 2018	
"Absolute Zero"	Stone Sour	2012	C♯ Standard	Stone Sour Song Pack		September 18, 2018	
"Bother"	Stone Sour	2002	E♭ Standard	Stone Sour Song Pack		September 18, 2018	
"Say You'll Haunt Me"	Stone Sour	2010	C♯ Standard	Stone Sour Song Pack		September 18, 2018	
"Paradise"	Coldplay	2011	E Standard	2010s Mix V		September 25, 2018	
"Ex's & Oh's"	Elle King	2015	E Standard	2010s Mix V		September 25, 2018	
"Red Eyes"	The War on Drugs	2014	Capo Required - Lead/Rhythm; E Standard - Bass	2010s Mix V		September 25, 2018	
"Disorder"	Joy Division	1979	E Standard	Joy Division Song Pack		October 2, 2018	
"Love Will Tear Us Apart"	Joy Division	1980	E Standard	Joy Division Song Pack		October 2, 2018	
"Transmission"	Joy Division	1979	E Standard	Joy Division Song Pack		October 2, 2018	
"Surfin' Safari"	The Beach Boys	1965	E Standard	Variety Pack XVIII		October 9, 2018	
"Gratitude"	Beastie Boys	1992	E Standard	Variety Pack XVIII		October 9, 2018	
"Stay Together for the Kids"	Blink-182	2002	E Standard	Variety Pack XVIII		October 9, 2018	
"Green Grass and High Tides"	Outlaws	1975	E Standard	Variety Pack XVIII		October 9, 2018	
"Mud on the Tires"	Brad Paisley	2003	E Standard - Lead/Bass; Capo Required - Rhythm	Brad Paisley Pack		October 16, 2018	
"Ticks"	Brad Paisley	2007	E Standard	Brad Paisley Pack		October 16, 2018	
"Whiskey Lullaby"	Brad Paisley ft. Alison Krauss	2003	E Standard - Lead/Alt. Rhythm/Bass; Drop D - Rhythm	Brad Paisley Pack		October 16, 2018	
"Take On Me"	A-ha	1985	E Standard	80s Mix VI		October 23, 2018	
"Keep Your Hands to Yourself"	The Georgia Satellites	1986	E Standard	80s Mix VI		October 23, 2018	
"Fallen Angel"	Poison	1988	E♭ Standard	80s Mix VI		October 23, 2018	
"Cirice"	Ghost	2015	D Standard	Ghost Pack		October 29, 2018	
"He Is"	Ghost	2015	D Standard	Ghost Pack		October 29, 2018	
"Ritual"	Ghost	2010	D Standard	Ghost Pack		October 29, 2018	
"Year Zero"	Ghost	2013	D Standard	Ghost Pack		October 29, 2018	
"Don't Stop Me Now"	Queen	1979	E Standard	Queen Pack II		November 6, 2018	
"We Will Rock You"	Queen	1977	E Standard	Queen Pack II		November 6, 2018	
"Love Of My Life"	Queen	1975	E Standard	Queen Pack II		November 6, 2018	
"Tie Your Mother Down"	Queen	1977	E Standard	Queen Pack II		November 6, 2018	
"In A Big Country"	Big Country	1983	E Standard	Variety Pack XIX		November 13, 2018	
"Stir It Up"	Bob Marley and the Wailers	1967	E Standard	Variety Pack XIX		November 13, 2018	
"Cissy Strut"	The Meters	1969	E Standard	Variety Pack XIX		November 13, 2018	
"More Human Than Human"	White Zombie	1995	C♯ Standard	Variety Pack XIX		November 13, 2018	
"Rockin' Around the Christmas Tree"	Brenda Lee	1983	E Standard	Christmas Classics		November 20, 2018	
"Run, Rudolph, Run"	Chuck Berry	1967	E Standard	Christmas Classics		November 20, 2018	
"Blue Christmas"	Elvis Presley	1969	E Standard	Christmas Classics		November 20, 2018	
"Rudolph The Red-Nosed Reindeer"	Gene Autry	1995	E Standard	Christmas Classics		November 20, 2018	
"Bleed American"	Jimmy Eat World	2001	Drop D	Jimmy Eat World Pack		November 27, 2018	
"The Middle"	Jimmy Eat World	2001	Drop D	Jimmy Eat World Pack		November 27, 2018	
"Sweetness"	Jimmy Eat World	2002	Drop D	Jimmy Eat World Pack		November 27, 2018	
"Billion Dollar Babies"	Alice Cooper	1973	E Standard	Alice Cooper Pack		December 4, 2018	
"Poison"	Alice Cooper	1989	E Standard - Lead/Rhythm; Drop D - Bass	Alice Cooper Pack		December 4, 2018	
"School's Out"	Alice Cooper	1973	E Standard	Alice Cooper Pack		December 4, 2018	
"Bad Company"	Five Finger Death Punch	2010	B Standard - Lead/Rhythm; Drop D - Bass	Five Finger Death Punch Pack		December 11, 2018	
"The Bleeding"	Five Finger Death Punch	2007	E Standard - Lead; Drop D - Bass; B Standard - Alt. Lead/Rhythm	Five Finger Death Punch Pack		December 11, 2018	
"Wrong Side of Heaven"	Five Finger Death Punch	2014	B Standard - Lead/Rhythm; E Standard - Bass	Five Finger Death Punch Pack		December 11, 2018	
"Brown Sugar"	The Rolling Stones	1971	Open G - Lead/Rhythm; Open D - Alt. Rhythm; E Standard - Bass	Rolling Stones Pack		December 18, 2018	
"Gimme Shelter"	The Rolling Stones	1969	E Standard - Lead/Bass; Open E - Rhythm	Rolling Stones Pack		December 18, 2018	
"Jumpin' Jack Flash"	The Rolling Stones	1968	E Standard - Lead/Rhythm/Bass; Open E - Alt. Lead	Rolling Stones Pack		December 18, 2018	
"Sympathy for the Devil"	The Rolling Stones	1968	E Standard	Rolling Stones Pack		December 18, 2018	
"Johnny B. Goode"	Chuck Berry	1958	E Standard	Chuck Berry Pack		January 8, 2019	
"School Day (Ring! Ring! Goes the Bell)"	Chuck Berry	1957	E Standard	Chuck Berry Pack		January 8, 2019	
"You Never Can Tell"	Chuck Berry	1964	E Standard	Chuck Berry Pack		January 8, 2019	
"Misery Business"	Paramore	2007	E♭ Drop D♭ - Lead/Rhythm; C♯ Standard - Bass	Paramore Song Pack II		January 15, 2019	
"Ignorance"	Paramore	2009	E Standard – Lead/Rhythm; D Standard - Bass	Paramore Song Pack II		January 15, 2019	
"Rose-Colored Boy"	Paramore	2018	E Standard	Paramore Song Pack II		January 15, 2019	
"Breakfast at Tiffany's"	Deep Blue Something	1995	E Standard	Variety Pack XX		January 22, 2019	
"On The Sunny Side of the Street"	Les Paul & Mary Ford	1955	E Standard	Variety Pack XX		January 22, 2019	
"Whiskey In The Jar"	Thin Lizzy	1973	E Standard	Variety Pack XX		January 22, 2019	
"Teenage Dirtbag"	Wheatus	2000	E Standard	Variety Pack XX		January 22, 2019	
"Hammer to Fall"	Queen	1984	E Standard	Queen Pack III		January 29, 2019	
"I Want to Break Free"	Queen	1984	E Standard	Queen Pack III		January 29, 2019	
"Somebody to Love"	Queen	1976	E Standard - Lead/Alt Lead/Bass; Capo Required - Rhythm	Queen Pack III		January 29, 2019	
"When I Come Around"	Green Day	1994	E♭ Standard	90s Mix VI		February 5, 2019	
"One of Us"	Joan Osborne	1995	Capo Required – Lead/Alt Lead/Rhythm; E Standard - Bass	90s Mix VI		February 5, 2019	
"Trippin' On a Hole in a Paper Heart"	Stone Temple Pilots	1996	E Standard	90s Mix VI		February 5, 2019	
"40:1"	Sabaton	2008	E Standard	Sabaton Song Pack		February 12, 2019	
"Ghost Division"	Sabaton	2008	E Standard	Sabaton Song Pack		February 12, 2019	
"Primo Victoria"	Sabaton	2005	E Standard	Sabaton Song Pack		February 12, 2019	
"Always"	Blink-182	2003	E Standard	2000s Mix V		February 19, 2019	
"Bodies"	Drowning Pool	2001	Drop C	2000s Mix V		February 19, 2019	
"Stacy's Mom"	Fountains of Wayne	2003	E Standard	2000s Mix V		February 19, 2019	
"The Regulator"	Clutch	2004	Drop D – Lead/Bass; Custom Tuning: DADFAd - Rhythm	Variety Pack XXI		February 26, 2019	
"Shimmer"	Fuel	1998	E Standard – Lead/Rhythm; Drop D - Bass	Variety Pack XXI		February 26, 2019	
"Found Out About You"	Gin Blossoms	1989	E Standard	Variety Pack XXI		February 26, 2019	
"Werewolves of London"	Warren Zevon	1978	E Standard	Variety Pack XXI		February 26, 2019	
"Alone"	Heart	1987	E Standard	Heart Pack		March 5, 2019	
"Straight On"	Heart	1978	E Standard	Heart Pack		March 5, 2019	
"What About Love"	Heart	1985	E Standard	Heart Pack		March 5, 2019	
"Don't Tell Me You Love Me"	Night Ranger	1982	E Standard	Night Ranger Pack		March 12, 2019	
"Sister Christian"	Night Ranger	1983	E Standard	Night Ranger Pack		March 12, 2019	
"(You Can Still) Rock in America"	Night Ranger	1983	E Standard	Night Ranger Pack		March 12, 2019	
"Brick House"	Commodores	1977	E Standard	70s Mix V		March 19, 2019	
"Maggot Brain"	Funkadelic	1971	E Standard	70s Mix V		March 19, 2019	
"Long Cool Woman in a Black Dress"	The Hollies	1972	E Standard	70s Mix V		March 19, 2019	
"Airbag"	Radiohead	1997	E Standard	Radiohead III		March 26, 2019	
"Fake Plastic Trees"	Radiohead	1995	E Standard	Radiohead III		March 26, 2019	
"Jigsaw Falling Into Place"	Radiohead	2007	DBDF♯Bd – Lead/Alt. Lead/Rhythm; E Standard – Bass	Radiohead III		March 26, 2019	
"It Must Have Been Love"	Roxette	1987	E Standard	Roxette Pack		April 2, 2019	
"Listen to Your Heart"	Roxette	1988	E Standard	Roxette Pack		April 2, 2019	
"The Look"	Roxette	1988	E Standard	Roxette Pack		April 2, 2019	
"Wild World"	Cat Stevens	1970	E Standard	Cat Stevens Pack		April 9, 2019	
"Father and Son"	Cat Stevens	1970	E Standard	Cat Stevens Pack		April 9, 2019	
"Morning Has Broken"	Cat Stevens	1971	E Standard	Cat Stevens Pack		April 9, 2019	
"Alison Hell"	Annihilator	1989	E Standard	Variety Pack XXII		April 16, 2019	
"Counting Blue Cars"	Dishwalla	1995	E Standard	Variety Pack XXII		April 16, 2019	
"From the Pinnacle to the Pit"	Ghost	2015	D Standard	Variety Pack XXII		April 16, 2019	
"Long Tall Sally"	Wanda Jackson	1958	E Standard	Variety Pack XXII		April 16, 2019	
"Party Hard"	Andrew W.K.	2001	E Standard	2000s Mix VI		April 23, 2019	
"The Adventure"	Angels & Airwaves	2006	Capo Required - Lead/Rhythm; E Standard - Bass	2000s Mix VI		April 23, 2019	
"Shiver"	Coldplay	2000	E Standard - Lead/Alt. Lead/Bass; EABGBd♯ - Rhythm	2000s Mix VI		April 23, 2019	
"When the Curtain Falls"	Greta Van Fleet	2018	E Standard	Greta Van Fleet II		April 30, 2019	
"Edge Of Darkness"	Greta Van Fleet	2017	E Standard	Greta Van Fleet II		April 30, 2019	
"You're the One"	Greta Van Fleet	2018	E Standard	Greta Van Fleet II		April 30, 2019	
"Girls Just Want To Have Fun"	Cyndi Lauper	1983	E Standard	Cyndi Lauper Pack		May 7, 2019	
"Time After Time"	Cyndi Lauper	1983	E Standard	Cyndi Lauper Pack		May 7, 2019	
"True Colors"	Cyndi Lauper	1986	E Standard	Cyndi Lauper Pack		May 7, 2019	
"Youth of the Nation"	P.O.D	2001	Drop C	P.O.D Pack		May 14, 2019	
"Boom"	P.O.D	2001	D Standard	P.O.D Pack		May 14, 2019	
"Alive"	P.O.D	2001	Drop C	P.O.D Pack		May 14, 2019	
"Amazing Grace"	The Notetrackers	2019	E Standard	Classic Melody Pack		May 21, 2019	
"When the Saints Go Marching In"	The Notetrackers	2019	E Standard	Classic Melody Pack		May 21, 2019	
"Frere Jacques"	The Notetrackers	2019	E Standard	Classic Melody Pack		May 21, 2019	
"She Looks So Perfect"	5 Seconds of Summer	2014	E Standard	5 Seconds of Summer Pack		May 28, 2019	
"Amnesia"	5 Seconds of Summer	2014	DADGAD - Lead/Rhythm; E Standard - Bass	5 Seconds of Summer Pack		May 28, 2019	
"She's Kinda Hot"	5 Seconds of Summer	2015	E Standard	5 Seconds of Summer Pack		May 28, 2019	
"Easy Hammer-on/Pull-off 1"	The Notetrackers	2019	E Standard	Rocksmith Easy Exercises, Vol. 1		June 4, 2019	
"Easy Linear Playing 1"	The Notetrackers	2019	E Standard	Rocksmith Easy Exercises, Vol. 1		June 4, 2019	
"Easy Pull-on/Hammer-off 1"	The Notetrackers	2019	E Standard	Rocksmith Easy Exercises, Vol. 1		June 4, 2019	
"Easy String Skipping 1"	The Notetrackers	2019	E Standard	Rocksmith Easy Exercises, Vol. 1		June 4, 2019	
"Easy String Switching 1"	The Notetrackers	2019	E Standard	Rocksmith Easy Exercises, Vol. 1		June 4, 2019	
"Dying in Your Arms"	Trivium	2005	Drop D	Trivium II Pack		June 11, 2019	
"A Gunshot to the Head of Trepidation"	Trivium	2005	Drop D	Trivium II Pack		June 11, 2019	
"Pull Harder on the Strings of Your Martyr"	Trivium	2005	Drop D	Trivium II Pack		June 11, 2019	
"Over the Hills and Far Away"	Nightwish	2001	E Standard	Rockin Covers II		June 18, 2019	
"Take On Me"	Reel Big Fish	1998	E Standard	Rockin Covers II		June 18, 2019	
"Louie Louie"	Joan Jett and the Blackhearts	1981	E Standard	Rockin Covers II		June 18, 2019	
"Call It Off"	Tegan and Sara	2007	E Standard - Lead/Alt. Lead/Bass; Capo Required - Rhythm/Alt. Rhythm	Tegan and Sara Pack		June 25, 2019	
"The Con"	Tegan and Sara	2007	Capo Required - Lead; EGDGBE Capo Required - Rhythm; E Standard - Bass	Tegan and Sara Pack		June 25, 2019	
"Walking with a Ghost"	Tegan and Sara	2004	E Standard	Tegan and Sara Pack		June 25, 2019	
"Intermediate Hammer-on/Pull-off 1"	The Notetrackers	2019	E Standard	Rocksmith Intermediate Exercises, Vol. 1		July 2, 2019	
"Intermediate Linear Playing 1"	The Notetrackers	2019	E Standard	Rocksmith Intermediate Exercises, Vol. 1		July 2, 2019	
"Intermediate Pull-on/Hammer-off 1"	The Notetrackers	2019	E Standard	Rocksmith Intermediate Exercises, Vol. 1		July 2, 2019	
"Intermediate String Skipping 1"	The Notetrackers	2019	E Standard	Rocksmith Intermediate Exercises, Vol. 1		July 2, 2019	
"Intermediate String Switching 1"	The Notetrackers	2019	E Standard	Rocksmith Intermediate Exercises, Vol. 1		July 2, 2019	
"My Medicine"	The Pretty Reckless	2010	E♭ Standard - Rhythm/Bass; Open E♭ - Lead	The Pretty Reckless Pack		July 9, 2019	
"Make Me Wanna Die"	The Pretty Reckless	2010	E♭ Standard	The Pretty Reckless Pack		July 9, 2019	
"Going to Hell"	The Pretty Reckless	2014	E♭ Drop D♭	The Pretty Reckless Pack		July 9, 2019	
"Bitter Sweet Symphony"	Aranbee Pop Symphony Orchestra	2009	E Standard	Indie Rock		July 16, 2019	
"Chasing Cars"	Snow Patrol	2006	E Standard	Indie Rock		July 16, 2019	
"Renegades"	X Ambassadors	2015	E Standard	Indie Rock		July 16, 2019	
"A Design for Life"	Manic Street Preachers	1996	E Standard	Manic Street Preachers		July 23, 2019	
"If You Tolerate This Your Children Will Be Next"	Manic Street Preachers	1998	E Standard	Manic Street Preachers		July 23, 2019	
"Motorcycle Emptiness"	Manic Street Preachers	1992	E Standard	Manic Street Preachers		July 23, 2019	
"Advanced Hammer-on/Pull-off 1"	The Notetrackers	2019	E Standard	Rocksmith Advanced Exercises, Vol. 1		July 30, 2019	
"Advanced Linear Playing 1"	The Notetrackers	2019	E Standard	Rocksmith Advanced Exercises, Vol. 1		July 30, 2019	
"Advanced Pull-on/Hammer-off 1"	The Notetrackers	2019	E Standard	Rocksmith Advanced Exercises, Vol. 1		July 30, 2019	
"Advanced String Skipping 1"	The Notetrackers	2019	E Standard	Rocksmith Advanced Exercises, Vol. 1		July 30, 2019	
"Advanced String Switching 1"	The Notetrackers	2019	E Standard	Rocksmith Advanced Exercises, Vol. 1		July 30, 2019	
"Break the Walls Down (Chris Jericho)"	Jim Johnston	2011	E Standard	Wrestling Theme Song Pack		August 6, 2019	
"Electrifying (The Rock)"	Jim Johnston	2011	E Standard - Lead; Drop D - Rhythm/Bass	Wrestling Theme Song Pack		August 6, 2019	
"I Won't Do What You Tell Me (Stone Cold Steve Austin)"	Jim Johnston	2007	E Standard	Wrestling Theme Song Pack		August 6, 2019	
"The Loner"	Gary Moore	1987	E Standard - Lead/Rhythm; Drop D - Bass	Gary Moore Pack		August 13, 2019	
"Over the Hills and Far Away"	Gary Moore	1987	E Standard	Gary Moore Pack		August 13, 2019	
"Still Got the Blues"	Gary Moore	1990	E Standard	Gary Moore Pack		August 13, 2019	
"The Bad Touch"	Bloodhound Gang	1999	E Standard	Bloodhound Gang Pack		August 20, 2019	
"The Ballad of Chasey Lain"	Bloodhound Gang	2000	E Standard	Bloodhound Gang Pack		August 20, 2019	
"Foxtrot Uniform Charlie Kilo"	Bloodhound Gang	2005	E Standard	Bloodhound Gang Pack		August 20, 2019	
"We Got the Beat"	The Go-Go's	1981	E Standard	Women Who Rock II		August 27, 2019	
"According to You"	Orianthi	2009	D Standard Lead/Rhythm/Bass; E Standard Alt. Lead	Women Who Rock II		August 27, 2019	
"Seether"	Veruca Salt	1994	E Standard	Women Who Rock II		August 27, 2019	
"Easy Hammer-on/Pull-off 2"	The Notetrackers	2019	E Standard	Rocksmith Easy Exercises, Vol. 2		September 3, 2019	
"Easy Linear Playing 2"	The Notetrackers	2019	E Standard	Rocksmith Easy Exercises, Vol. 2		September 3, 2019	
"Easy Pull-on/Hammer-off 2"	The Notetrackers	2019	E Standard	Rocksmith Easy Exercises, Vol. 2		September 3, 2019	
"Easy String Skipping 2"	The Notetrackers	2019	E Standard	Rocksmith Easy Exercises, Vol. 2		September 3, 2019	
"Easy String Switching 2"	The Notetrackers	2019	E Standard	Rocksmith Easy Exercises, Vol. 2		September 3, 2019	
"All the Pretty Girls"	Kaleo	2016	E Standard - Bass; Capo Required - Lead/Rhythm	Kaleo		September 10, 2019	
"No Good"	Kaleo	2016	E Standard	Kaleo		September 10, 2019	
"Way Down We Go"	Kaleo	2016	E Standard - Lead; Capo Required - Rhythm; E♭ Standard - Bass	Kaleo		September 10, 2019	
"No Reason"	Audrey and Kate	2019	E Standard	Social Stars		September 17, 2019	
"Guitar Solos With Dooo #2 - Ascend"	The Dooo	2016	E♭ Standard - Lead; Drop C - Rhythm/Bass	Social Stars		September 17, 2019	
"Everything But Me"	Set the Charge	2017	Drop D - Lead/Rhythm; D Standard - Bass	Social Stars		September 17, 2019	
"Highway to Oblivion"	DragonForce	2019	E Standard	—N/a		September 24, 2019	
"Amaranthine"	Amaranthe	2011	C Standard	Amaranthe Song Pack		October 1, 2019	
"Drop Dead Cynical"	Amaranthe	2014	B Standard - Lead; E Standard - Bass	Amaranthe Song Pack		October 1, 2019	
"The Nexus"	Amaranthe	2013	C Drop B♭ - Lead/Rhythm; Drop C - Bass	Amaranthe Song Pack		October 1, 2019	
"Intermediate Hammer-on/Pull-off 2"	The Notetrackers	2019	E Standard	Rocksmith Intermediate Exercises, Vol. 2		October 8, 2019	
"Intermediate Linear Playing 2"	The Notetrackers	2019	E Standard	Rocksmith Intermediate Exercises, Vol. 2		October 8, 2019	
"Intermediate Pull-on/Hammer-off 2"	The Notetrackers	2019	E Standard	Rocksmith Intermediate Exercises, Vol. 2		October 8, 2019	
"Intermediate String Skipping 2"	The Notetrackers	2019	E Standard	Rocksmith Intermediate Exercises, Vol. 2		October 8, 2019	
"Intermediate String Switching 2"	The Notetrackers	2019	E Standard	Rocksmith Intermediate Exercises, Vol. 2		October 8, 2019	
"Davidian"	Machine Head	1994	D Drop C	Metal Mix Song Pack II		October 15, 2019	
"Are You Dead Yet?"	Children of Bodom	2005	D Drop C	Metal Mix Song Pack II		October 15, 2019	
"Crystal Mountain"	Death	1995	D Standard	Metal Mix Song Pack II		October 15, 2019	
"Galileo"	Indigo Girls	1992	Capo Required: DADGBC - Lead; Capo Required - Rhythm; E Standard - Bass	Indigo Girls Pack		October 22, 2019	
"Power of Two"	Indigo Girls	1994	Capo Required - Lead/Rhythm; E Standard - Bass	Indigo Girls Pack		October 22, 2019	
"Closer to Fine"	Indigo Girls	1989	Capo Required - Lead/Rhythm; E Standard - Bass	Indigo Girls Pack		October 22, 2019	
"Time of the Season"	The Zombies	1968	E Standard	The Zombies Pack		October 29, 2019	
"Tell Her No"	The Zombies	1965	E Standard	The Zombies Pack		October 29, 2019	
"She's Not There"	The Zombies	1964	E Standard	The Zombies Pack		October 29, 2019	
"Advanced Hammer-on/Pull-off 2"	The Notetrackers	2019	E Standard	Rocksmith Advanced Exercises, Vol. 2		November 5, 2019	
"Advanced Linear Playing 2"	The Notetrackers	2019	E Standard	Rocksmith Advanced Exercises, Vol. 2		November 5, 2019	
"Advanced Pull-on/Hammer-off 2"	The Notetrackers	2019	E Standard	Rocksmith Advanced Exercises, Vol. 2		November 5, 2019	
"Advanced String Skipping 2"	The Notetrackers	2019	E Standard	Rocksmith Advanced Exercises, Vol. 2		November 5, 2019	
"Advanced String Switching 2"	The Notetrackers	2019	E Standard	Rocksmith Advanced Exercises, Vol. 2		November 5, 2019	
"Over You"	Daughtry	2006	E♭ Standard	Daughtry Song Pack		November 12, 2019	
"Feels Like Tonight"	Daughtry	2006	E♭ Standard	Daughtry Song Pack		November 12, 2019	
"Home"	Daughtry	2006	Capo Required: E♭ Standard - Lead; E♭ Standard - Rhythm/Bass	Daughtry Song Pack		November 12, 2019	
"Going Down"	Freddie King	1971	E Standard	Blues Song Pack III		November 19, 2019	
"San Francisco"	John Lee Hooker	1963	E Standard	Blues Song Pack III		November 19, 2019	
"Bootie Cooler"	Shuggie Otis	1970	E Standard	Blues Song Pack III		November 19, 2019	
"Heartbreaker"	Pat Benatar	1979	E Standard	Pat Benatar Song Pack		November 26, 2019	
"We Belong"	Pat Benatar	1984	E Standard	Pat Benatar Song Pack		November 26, 2019	
"Hell Is For Children"	Pat Benatar	1980	E Standard	Pat Benatar Song Pack		November 26, 2019	
"Perfect Situation"	Weezer	2005	E♭ Standard - Lead/Bass; E♭ Drop D♭ - Rhythm	Weezer Song Pack II		December 3, 2019	
"Beverly Hills"	Weezer	2005	E♭ Standard	Weezer Song Pack II		December 3, 2019	
"Pork and Beans"	Weezer	2008	E♭ Standard	Weezer Song Pack II		December 3, 2019	
"Dancing Queen"	ABBA	1976	E Standard	ABBA Song Pack		December 10, 2019	
"Fernando"	ABBA	1976	E Standard	ABBA Song Pack		December 10, 2019	
"Mamma Mia"	ABBA	1975	E Standard	ABBA Song Pack		December 10, 2019	
"Crazy"	Aerosmith	1993	E Standard	Aerosmith Song Pack II		December 17, 2019	
"Love in an Elevator"	Aerosmith	1989	E Standard	Aerosmith Song Pack II		December 17, 2019	
"Train Kept A-Rollin'"	Aerosmith	1974	E Standard	Aerosmith Song Pack II		December 17, 2019	
"Tennessee Whiskey"	Chris Stapleton	2015	E Standard	Chris Stapleton Song Pack		January 7, 2020	
"Parachute"	Chris Stapleton	2015	E♭ Standard	Chris Stapleton Song Pack		January 7, 2020	
"Nobody to Blame"	Chris Stapleton	2015	Capo Required: Drop D - Lead/Rhythm; E Standard - Bass	Chris Stapleton Song Pack		January 7, 2020	
"Jack & Diane"	John Mellencamp	1982	E Standard - Lead/Rhythm; Drop D - Bass	John Mellencamp Song Pack		January 14, 2020	
"Pink Houses"	John Mellencamp	1983	Open G - Lead; E Standard - Rhythm/Bass	John Mellencamp Song Pack		January 14, 2020	
"Small Town"	John Mellencamp	1985	Capo Required: Lead/Rhythm; E Standard - Bass	John Mellencamp Song Pack		January 14, 2020	
"Don't Save Me"	Haim	2012	E Standard	Haim Song Pack		January 21, 2020	
"Forever"	Haim	2012	E Standard	Haim Song Pack		January 21, 2020	
"The Wire"	Haim	2013	E Standard	Haim Song Pack		January 21, 2020	
"House of Broken Love"	Great White	1989	E Standard	Great White Song Pack		January 28, 2020	
"Once Bitten, Twice Shy"	Great White	1989	E Standard	Great White Song Pack		January 28, 2020	
"Rock Me"	Great White	1987	E Standard	Great White Song Pack		January 28, 2020	
"Signed, Sealed, Delivered I'm Yours"	Stevie Wonder	1970	E Standard	Stevie Wonder Song Pack		February 4, 2020	
"Superstition"	Stevie Wonder	1972	E♭ Standard - Lead/Alt. Lead/Rhythm; E♭ Drop D♭ - Bass	Stevie Wonder Song Pack		February 4, 2020	
"I Wish"	Stevie Wonder	1976	E Standard - Lead/Rhythm; E♭ Standard - Bass	Stevie Wonder Song Pack		February 4, 2020	
"Brain Stew"	Green Day	1996	E♭ Standard	Green Day IV		February 11, 2020	
"Father of All..."	Green Day	2020	E Standard	Green Day IV		February 11, 2020	
"Fire, Ready, Aim"	Green Day	2020	E Standard	Green Day IV		February 11, 2020	
"Bruise Violet"	Babes in Toyland	1992	E Standard	Riot Grrrl Song Pack		February 18, 2020	
"Pretend We're Dead"	L7	1992	E Standard	Riot Grrrl Song Pack		February 18, 2020	
"Dig Me Out"	Sleater-Kinney	1997	C♯ Standard - Lead/Rhythm; E Standard - Bass	Riot Grrrl Song Pack		February 18, 2020	
"Black"	Sevendust	1997	E♭ Drop D♭	Sevendust Song Pack		February 25, 2020	
"Angel's Son"	Sevendust	2001	E♭ Drop D♭	Sevendust Song Pack		February 25, 2020	
"Praise"	Sevendust	2001	C♯ Drop B - Lead/Rhythm; E♭ Drop D♭ - Bass	Sevendust Song Pack		February 25, 2020	
"Come to My Window"	Melissa Etheridge	1993	E Standard	Melissa Etheridge Song Pack		March 3, 2020	
"I'm the Only One"	Melissa Etheridge	1993	E Standard	Melissa Etheridge Song Pack		March 3, 2020	
"I Want to Come Over"	Melissa Etheridge	1995	E Standard	Melissa Etheridge Song Pack		March 3, 2020	
"Stars"	Sixx:A.M.	2014	E Standard - Lead/Rhythm; Drop D - Bass	Sixx:A.M. Song Pack		March 10, 2020	
"Life is Beautiful"	Sixx:A.M.	2007	Drop D	Sixx:A.M. Song Pack		March 10, 2020	
"This is Gonna Hurt"	Sixx:A.M.	2011	Drop D	Sixx:A.M. Song Pack		March 10, 2020	
"You're So Vain"	Carly Simon	1972	E Standard	70s Mix VI		March 17, 2020	
"Saturday in the Park"	Chicago	1972	E Standard	70s Mix VI		March 17, 2020	
"Breezin'"	George Benson	1976	E Standard	70s Mix VI		March 17, 2020	
"Piece of My Heart"	Big Brother and the Holding Company	1968	E Standard	Janis Joplin Song Pack		March 24, 2020	
"Summertime"	Big Brother and the Holding Company	1968	E Standard	Janis Joplin Song Pack		March 24, 2020	
"Me and Bobby McGee"	Janis Joplin	1971	E Standard	Janis Joplin Song Pack		March 24, 2020	
"Bleak"	Opeth	2001	E Standard	Opeth Song Pack		March 31, 2020	
"Blackwater Park"	Opeth	2001	Drop D	Opeth Song Pack		March 31, 2020	
"Ghost of Perdition"	Opeth	2005	Custom Tuning: DADFAE - Lead/Rhythm; Drop D - Bass	Opeth Song Pack		March 31, 2020	
