= Halestorm discography =

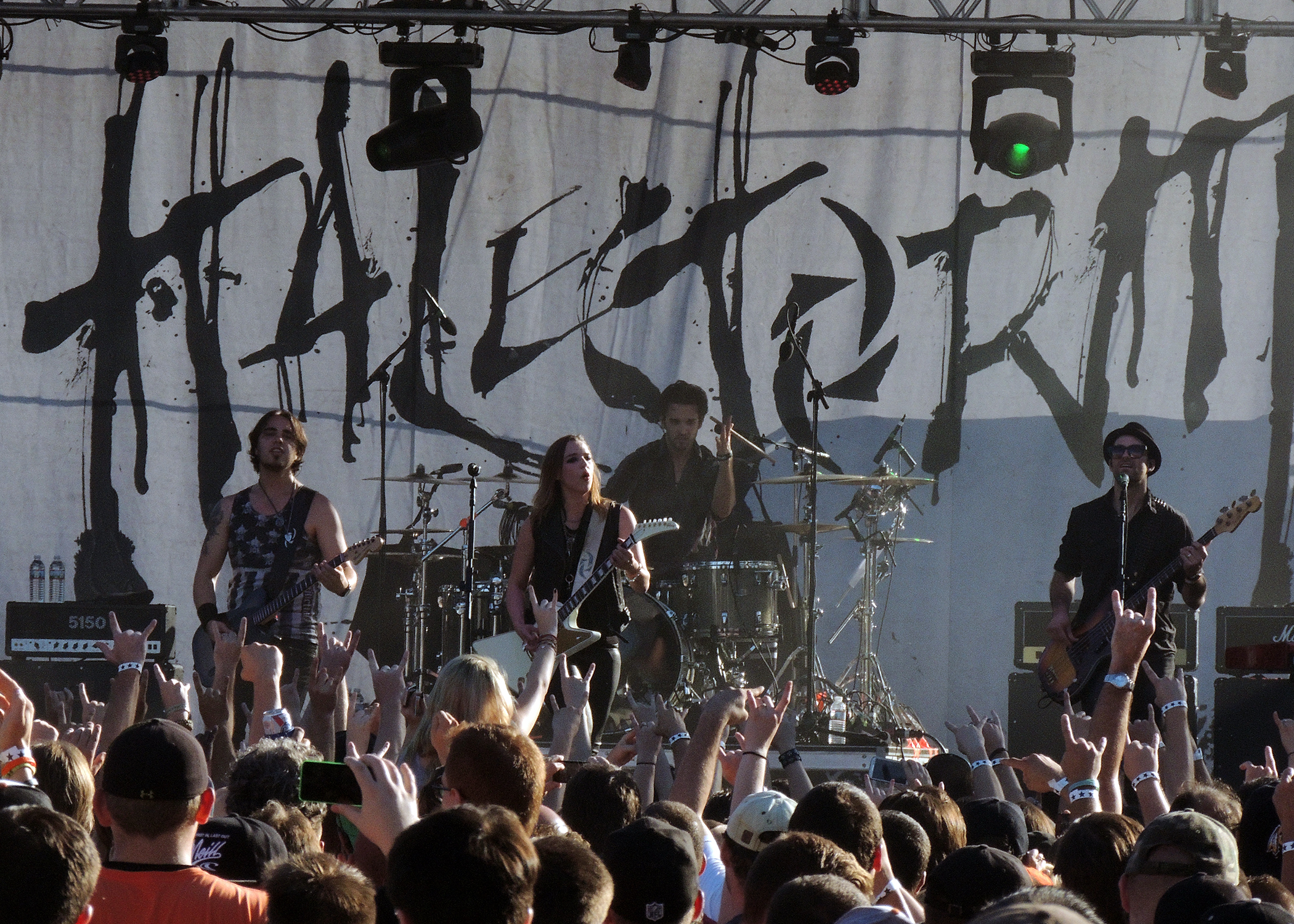
- Halestorm performing in 2014
- Studio albums: 6
- Extended plays: 12
- Live albums: 1
- Singles: 21
- Music videos: 21

The discography of American hard rock band Halestorm consists of six studio albums, one live albums twelve extended plays, twenty-one singles, ten promotional singles and twenty-one music videos. The band has placed eleven singles within the top ten of the Mainstream Rock airplay chart, including six number ones. Halestorm had tied the record set by The Pretty Reckless for the most number one singles by a female rock artist or female-fronted rock band (four) with 2018's "Uncomfortable", but the latter band has since extended their own record to seven.

== Albums ==
=== Studio albums ===
List of studio albums, with selected chart positions and certifications
Title	Album details	Peak chart positions										Sales	Certifications
Title	Album details	US	US Rock	AUS	BEL (FL)	CAN	JPN	NLD	SWE	SWI	UK	Sales	Certifications
Halestorm	Released: April 28, 2009 (US); Label: Atlantic; Formats: CD, digital download	40	11	—	—	—	—	—	—	—	—		RIAA: Gold
The Strange Case Of...	Released: April 10, 2012 (US); Label: Atlantic, Roadrunner; Formats: CD, LP, digital download	15	7	—	—	—	52	—	—	—	49		RIAA: Platinum; BPI: Gold
Into the Wild Life	Released: April 14, 2015 (US); Label: Atlantic; Formats: CD, LP, digital download	5	1	51	73	7	55	59	50	20	10		
Vicious	Released: July 27, 2018; Label: Atlantic; Formats: CD, LP, digital download	8	1	16	26	14	80	53	—	10	8	US: 180,000	
Back from the Dead	Released: May 6, 2022; Label: Atlantic; Formats: CD, LP, digital download	36	4	90	58	94	34	—	—	12	9	US: 107,000	
Everest	Released: August 8, 2025; Label: Atlantic; Formats: CD, LP, digital download	156	11	—	174	—	— (Note: Everest did not enter the Japanese Oricon Albums Chart, but peaked at number 11 on the Japanese Western Albums Chart.)	—	47	9	16	UK: 4,899	
"—" denotes a recording that did not chart or was not released in that territory.

=== Live albums ===
List of live albums
Title	Album details
Live in Philly 2010	Released: November 16, 2010 (US); Label: Atlantic; Formats: CD, digital download
Live in Wembley	Released: May 24, 2024 (US); Label: Atlantic; Formats: digital download

== Extended plays ==
List of extended plays, with selected chart positions
Title	Details	Peak chart positions									
Title	Details	US	US Hard Rock	US Rock	AUS	CAN	NZ	SCO	SWI	UK	UK Rock
Forecast for the Future	Released: 1997 (US); Label: Self-released; Formats: Cassette	—	—	—	—	—	—	—	—	—	—
(Don't Mess with the) Time Man	Released: 1999 (US); Label: Worldview; Formats: CD, digital download	—	—	—	—	—	—	—	—	—	—
Breaking the Silence	Released: 2001 (US); Label: Self-released; Formats: CD	—	—	—	—	—	—	—	—	—	—
One and Done	Released: April 25, 2006 (US); Label: Atlantic; Formats: CD, digital download	—	—	—	—	—	—	—	—	—	—
Reanimate: The Covers EP	Released: March 22, 2011 (US); Label: Atlantic; Formats: CD, digital download	—	20	—	—	—	—	—	—	—	—
Hello, It's Mz. Hyde	Released: January 24, 2012 (US); Label: Atlantic; Formats: Digital download	108	11	33	—	—	—	—	—	—	—
In the Live Room	Released: November 6, 2012 (US); Label: Atlantic; Formats: Digital download	—	—	—	—	—	—	—	—	—	—
Reanimate 2.0: The Covers EP	Released: October 15, 2013 (US); Label: Atlantic; Formats: CD, digital download	40	5	14	—	—	—	—	—	—	—
Into the Wild Live: Chicago	Released: April 15, 2016 (US); Label: Atlantic; Formats: LP, digital download	—	—	—	—	—	—	—	—	—	—
Reanimate 3.0: The Covers EP	Released: January 6, 2017 (US); Label: Atlantic; Formats: CD, LP, digital download	23	1	2	30	54	36	45	78	67	2
Vicious (Stripped)	Released: March 6, 2020; Label: Atlantic; Formats: LP, digital download, streaming	—	—	—	—	—	—	—	—	—	—
Reimagined	Released: August 14, 2020; Label: Atlantic; Formats: vinyl, digital download, streaming	—	—	—	—	—	—	—	—	—	—
"—" denotes a recording that did not chart or was not released in that territory.

== Singles ==
List of singles, with selected chart positions and certifications, showing year released and album name
Title	Year	Peak chart positions							Certifications	Album
Title	Year	US Under	US Alt. Airplay	US Hard Rock Digi.	US Hot Hard Rock	US Main. Rock	US Rock / Alt	CAN Rock	Certifications	Album
"I Get Off"	2009	—	28	—	—	6	17	—	RIAA: Platinum; MC: Gold	Halestorm
"It's Not You"	2009	—	—	—	—	8	24	—		Halestorm
"Familiar Taste of Poison"	2010	—	—	—	—	36	—	—		Halestorm
"Bet U Wish U Had Me Back"	2010	—	—	—	—	33	—	—		Halestorm
"Love Bites (So Do I)"	2012	—	—	—	—	2	16	—	RIAA: Gold	The Strange Case Of...
"I Miss the Misery"	2012	—	—	3	—	2	19	—	RIAA: Platinum; BPI: Silver; IFPI SWE: Gold; RMNZ: Gold	The Strange Case Of...
"Freak Like Me"	2013	—	—	—	—	1	48	—	RIAA: Gold	The Strange Case Of...
"Here's to Us"	2013	25	— (Note: "Here's to Us" did not enter the Alternative Songs chart, but peaked at number 16 on the Alternative Digital Song Sales chart.)	—	—	15	47	—	RIAA: Gold	The Strange Case Of...
"Mz. Hyde"	2013	—	—	—	—	15	—	—		The Strange Case Of...
"Apocalyptic"	2015	—	—	6	—	1	34	47		Into the Wild Life
"Amen"	2015	—	—	8	—	1	38	—		Into the Wild Life
"I Am the Fire"	2015	—	—	—	—	3	40	—		Into the Wild Life
"Mayhem"	2016	—	—	—	—	7	— (Note: "Mayhem" did not enter the Hot Rock Songs chart, but peaked at number 30 on the Rock Airplay chart.)	—		Into the Wild Life
"Mistress for Christmas"	2016	— (Note: "Mistress for Christmas" peaked at number 15 on the Hot Singles Sales chart.)	—	—	—	—	—	—		Non-album single
"Uncomfortable"	2018	—	—	7	—	1	28	47		Vicious
"Black Vultures"	2018	—	—	20	—	25	— (Note: "Black Vultures" did not enter the Hot Rock Songs chart, but peaked at number 20 on the Hard Rock Digital Song Sales chart.)	—		Vicious
"Do Not Disturb"	2018	—	—	10	—	8	49	—		Vicious
"Vicious"	2019	—	—	—	—	13	— (Note: "Vicious" did not enter the Hot Rock Songs chart, but peaked at number 48 on the Rock Airplay chart.)	—		Vicious
"Break In" (featuring Amy Lee)	2020	—	—	—	—	—	— (Note: "Break In" did not enter the Hot Rock Songs chart, but peaked at number 16 on the Rock Digital Song Sales chart.)	—		Reimagined
"Long Live Rock"	2021	—	—	—	—	—	—	—		Non-album single
"Back from the Dead"	2021	—	—	5	6	1	—	42		Back from the Dead
"The Steeple"	2022	—	—	8	13	1	—	—		Back from the Dead
"Wicked Ways"	2022	—	—	—	24	15	—	—		Back from the Dead
"Can U See Me In the Dark?" (with I Prevail)	2024	—	—	—	6	1	—	39		Non-album single
"Darkness Always Wins"	2025	—	—	6	22	6	—	—		Everest
"Like a Woman Can"	2025	—	—	—	—	18	—	—		Everest
"—" denotes a recording that did not chart or was not released in that territory.

=== Promotional singles ===
List of promotional singles, with selected chart positions and certifications, showing year released and album name
Title	Year	Peak chart positions		Certifications	Album
Title	Year	US Main. Rock	US Rock	Certifications	Album
"Bad Romance"	2013	—	—	RIAA: Gold	Reanimate: The Covers EP
"Get Lucky"	2013	—	—		Reanimate 2.0: The Covers EP
"Rock Show"	2013	—	—		The Strange Case Of...
"American Boys"	2014	—	—		The Strange Case Of...
"Sick Individual"	2015	—	—		Into the Wild Life
"I Like It Heavy"	2016	—	—		Into the Wild Life
"Still of the Night"	2016	20	—		Reanimate 3.0: The Covers EP
"I Hate Myself for Loving You"	2016	—	28		Reanimate 3.0: The Covers EP
"Dear Daughter"	2017	—	—		Into the Wild Life
"Buzz"	2019	—	—		Vicious
"Chemicals"	2019	—	—		Non-album single
"Everest"	2025	—	—		Everest
"Rain Your Blood On Me"	2025	—	—		Everest
"—" denotes a recording that did not chart or was not released in that territory.

== Music videos ==
List of music videos, showing year released and directors
Title	Year	Director(s)	Ref.
"I Get Off"	2009	Phil Mucci	
"Love/Hate Heartbreak"	2009	Unknown	
"It's Not You"	2009	Phil Botti	
"Familiar Taste of Poison"	2010	Jeremy Alter	
"Love Bites (So Do I)"	2012	Jeremy Alter	
"I Miss the Misery"	2012	Michael Thelin	
"Freak Like Me"	2013	Rob Fenn	
"Here's to Us"	2013	Jeremy Alter	
"Mz. Hyde"	2014	Daniel E. Catullo III	
"Apocalyptic"	2015	DJay Brawner	
"Amen"	2015	DJay Brawner	
"I Am the Fire"	2015	DJay Brawner	
"Mayhem"	2016	DJay Brawner	
"Dear Daughter"	2017	Hayley Young	
"Uncomfortable"	2018	Evan Brace	
"Do Not Disturb"	2018	Roboshobo	
"Vicious"	2019	Sean Davé	
"Break In" (featuring Amy Lee)	2020	Unknown	
"Back From the Dead"	2021	Dustin Haney	
"The Steeple"	2022	Unknown	
"Wicked Ways"	2022	Dustin Haney	
"Terrible Things" (featuring Ashley McBryde)	2023	Dustin Haney	
"Everest"	2025	DJay Brawner	
"Darkness Always Wins"	2025	DJay Brawner	
"Like a Woman Can"	2025	Chase Denton	
