= Apocalyptic (song) =

Single by Halestorm

from the album Into the Wild Life
- Released: January 12, 2015
- Genre: Hard rock
- Length: 3:15
- Label: Atlantic
- Songwriters: Lzzy Hale; Nate Campany; Scott Stevens
- Producer: Jay Joyce

Halestorm singles chronology
"Mz. Hyde" (2013)	"Apocalyptic" (2015)	"Amen" (2015)

Music video
- "Apocalyptic" on YouTube

"Apocalyptic" is a song by the American hard rock band Halestorm. It was released on January 12, 2015, as the lead single from the band's third studio album, Into the Wild Life. The video for the song was released on January 28.

== Track listing ==
All tracks are produced by Jay Joyce.

CD single:
No.	Title	Writer(s)	Length
1.	"Apocalyptic"	Lzzy Hale; Nat Campany; Scott Stevens	3:17
2.	"Amen"	Hale; Joe Hottinger; Stevens	2:58
Total length:			6:15

== Charts ==
Chart (2015)	Peak position
US Mainstream Rock (Billboard)	1
US Hot Rock & Alternative Songs (Billboard)	34
US Rock & Alternative Airplay (Billboard)	18
