= Amen (Halestorm song) =

Single by Halestorm

from the album Into the Wild Life
- Released: May 3, 2015
- Genre: Hard rock
- Length: 2:58
- Label: Atlantic
- Songwriters: Lzzy Hale; Joe Hottinger; Scott Stevens
- Producer: Jay Joyce

Halestorm singles chronology
"Apocalyptic" (2015)	"Amen" (2015)	"I Am the Fire" (2015)

Music video
- "Amen" on YouTube

"Amen" is the second single on Halestorm's third studio album Into the Wild Life.

== Composition ==
Frontwoman Lzzy Hale has stated in interviews that the song is about personal freedom to do whatever you want.

== Music video ==
The music video was released on March 2, 2015.

== Chart positions ==
The song was their third number-one on the Mainstream Rock chart, allowing them to tie with The Pretty Reckless to have the most number-ones on that chart by a band led by a female vocalist.

Chart (2015)	Peak position
US Hot Rock & Alternative Songs (Billboard)	38
US Rock & Alternative Airplay (Billboard)	19
US Mainstream Rock (Billboard)	1
