= Reanimate 3.0: The Covers EP =

ReAniMate 3.0: The CoVeRs eP

EP by Halestorm
- Released: January 6, 2017
- Genre: Hard rock, alternative metal
- Length: 27:20
- Label: Atlantic
- Producer: Nick Raskulinecz

Halestorm chronology
Into the Wild Life (2015)	ReAniMate 3.0: The CoVeRs eP (2017)	Vicious (2018)

ReAniMate 3.0: The CoVeRs eP is an EP by the American hard rock band Halestorm. It was released in the United States on January 6, 2017 as a follow-up to ReAniMate 2.0: The CoVeRs eP (2013). ReAniMate 3.0 features Halestorm's covers of six songs, all from different artists.

== Track listing ==
No.	Title	Writer(s)	Originally performed by	Length
1.	"Still of the Night"	David Coverdale, John Sykes	Whitesnake	4:24
2.	"Damn I Wish I Was Your Lover"	Sophie B. Hawkins	Sophie B. Hawkins	4:00
3.	"I Hate Myself for Loving You"	Desmond Child, Joan Jett	Joan Jett and the Blackhearts	4:10
4.	"Heathens"	Tyler Joseph	Twenty One Pilots	3:28
5.	"Fell on Black Days"	Chris Cornell	Soundgarden	4:44
6.	"Ride the Lightning"	James Hetfield, Lars Ulrich, Cliff Burton, Dave Mustaine	Metallica	6:34
Total length:				27:20

== Personnel ==
Adapted from the liner notes.

Halestorm

- Lzzy Hale – vocals, guitar
- Arejay Hale – drums
- Joe Hottinger – guitars
- Josh Smith – bass guitar

== Charts ==
Chart (2017)	Peak position
Australian Albums (ARIA)	30
Canadian Albums (Billboard)	54
New Zealand Albums (RMNZ)	36
Scottish Albums (OCC)	45
Swiss Albums (Schweizer Hitparade)	78
UK Albums (OCC)	67
UK Rock & Metal Albums (OCC)	2
US Billboard 200	23
US Top Hard Rock Albums (Billboard)	1
US Top Rock Albums (Billboard)	2
