= One and done =

One and done may refer to:

- One and Done (EP), by the American hard rock band Halestorm
- One & Done (film), about Australian basketball player Ben Simmons

== See also ==
- One-and-done rule, basketball rule whereby players are eligible for the NBA draft after playing in college for one year
