= Red Lion, Pennsylvania =

Borough in Pennsylvania, US

- Borough
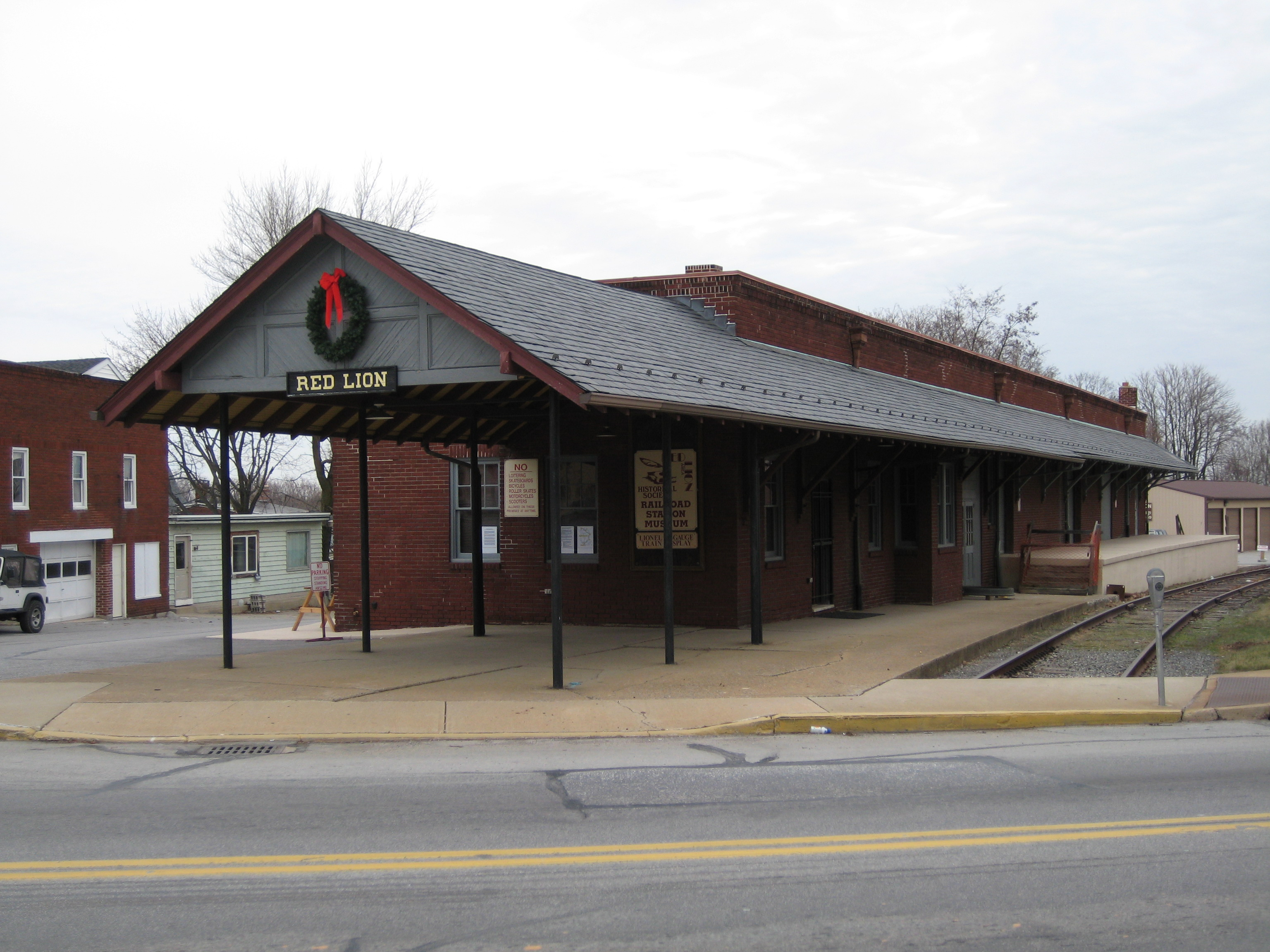
- The former "Ma and Pa" railroad station in Red Lion

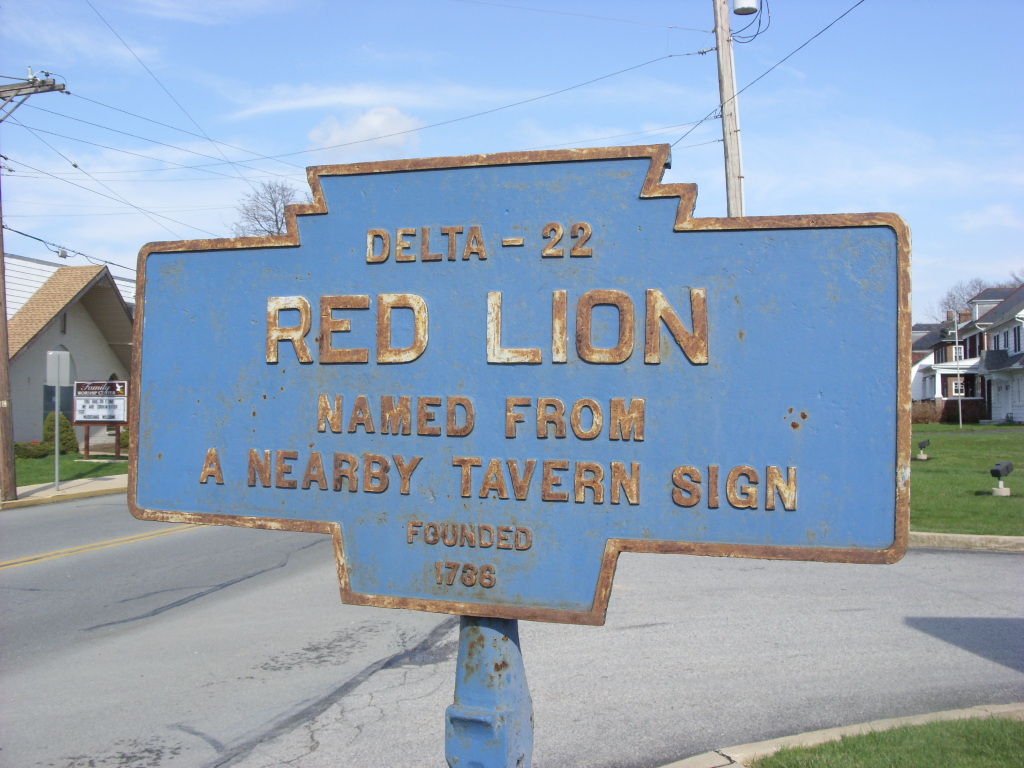
- Keystone Marker

- Location in York County and the state of Pennsylvania.

- Location of Red Lion in Pennsylvania Red Lion (the United States)
- Coordinates: 39°53′56″N 76°36′23″W
- Country: United States
- State: Pennsylvania
- County: York
- Settled: 1852
- Incorporated: January 16, 1880
- Named for: Red Lion Tavern

Government
  - Mayor: Aleksa Keithan
  - Council President: Tony Musso

Area
  - Total: 1.31 sq mi (3.40 km^{2})
  - Land: 1.31 sq mi (3.40 km^{2})
  - Water: 0 sq mi (0.00 km^{2})
- Elevation: 921 ft (281 m)

Population (2020)
  - Total: 6,512
  - Density: 4,961.2/sq mi (1,915.54/km^{2})
- Time zone: UTC-5 (EST)
  - Summer (DST): UTC-4 (EDT)
- ZIP Code: 17356
- Area code: 717
- FIPS code: 42-63840
- Website: Official website

Red Lion (Pennsylvania Dutch: Rot Leeb) is a borough in York County, Pennsylvania, United States, settled in 1852 and incorporated on January 16, 1880. The population was 6,506 at the 2020 census. It is part of the York–Hanover metropolitan area.

== History ==
Red Lion, settled in 1852, was named after one of the first pubs in town, the Red Lion Tavern.

The town was a main stop along the old Maryland and Pennsylvania Railroad, known locally as the "Ma & Pa" Railroad. That railroad ran from York County to Baltimore, Maryland.

Red Lion was once famous for the many brands of cigars made there. The town produced millions of cigars per month, about 10% of the cigars made in the United States. The town raises a cigar every New Year's Eve. It was also known nationwide for its furniture industry, with several large factories producing ornate, hand crafted furniture for over 100 years. The furniture industry has mostly shifted to kitchen cabinet production and retail store fixtures over the last 40 years.

The Consumers Cigar Box Company and Red Lion Borough Historic District are listed on the National Register of Historic Places.

== Geography ==
Red Lion is located about 8 miles (13 km) southeast of York. According to the U.S. Census Bureau, the borough has a total area of 1.3 square miles (3.3 km^{2}), all land.

== Demographics ==
Historical population
Census	Pop.	Note	%±
1880	241		—
1890	524		117.4%
1900	1,337		155.2%
1910	2,092		56.5%
1920	3,198		52.9%
1930	4,757		48.7%
1940	4,891		2.8%
1950	5,119		4.7%
1960	5,594		9.3%
1970	5,645		0.9%
1980	5,824		3.2%
1990	6,130		5.3%
2000	6,149		0.3%
2010	6,373		3.6%
2020	6,512		2.2%
2021 (est.)	6,489	▼	−0.4%
U.S. Decennial Census

As of the census of 2000, there were 6,149 people, 2,575 households, and 1,645 families residing in the borough. The population density was 4,789.9 inhabitants per square mile (1,849.4/km^{2}). There were 2,729 housing units at an average density of 2,125.8 per square mile (820.8/km^{2}). The racial makeup of the borough was 97.12% White, 0.60% African American, 0.24% Native American, 0.41% Asian, 0.05% Pacific Islander, 0.33% from other races, and 1.25% from two or more races. Hispanic or Latino of any race were 0.91% of the population.

There were 2,575 households, out of which 31.6% had children under the age of 18 living with them, 46.8% were married couples living together, 12.1% had a female householder with no husband present, and 36.1% were non-families. 29.6% of all households were made up of individuals, and 11.0% had someone living alone who was 65 years of age or older. The average household size was 2.37 and the average family size was 2.92.

In the borough the population was spread out, with 25.1% under the age of 18, 9.3% from 18 to 24, 32.2% from 25 to 44, 19.9% from 45 to 64, and 13.5% who were 65 years of age or older. The median age was 34 years. For every 100 females, there were 92.9 males. For every 100 females age 18 and over, there were 86.8 males.

The median income for a household in the borough was $35,828, and the median income for a family was $41,850. Males had a median income of $31,595 versus $21,934 for females. The per capita income for the borough was $17,723. About 6.1% of families and 10.4% of the population were below the poverty line, including 17.4% of those under age 18 and 11.1% of those age 65 or over.

== Schools ==
- Red Lion Area Senior High School
- Red Lion Area Junior High School
- Locust Grove Elementary School
- Windsor Manor Elementary School (Now administration)
- Larry J. Macaluso Elementary School
- Mazie Gable Elementary School
- Pleasant View Elementary School
- Clearview Elementary School
- North Hopewell-Winterstown Elementary School
- River Rock Academy - Red Lion Campus
- Red Lion Christian School

On March 19, 2009, the Red Lion Area School Board voted 8–0 to close 2 elementary schools in the district. Chanceford and Edgar Moore elementary schools closed at the end of the 2009 school year. The students from the schools were placed in other schools throughout the district including a brand new elementary school. The new school, Larry J. Macaluso Elementary School, was completed in 2009 and is named after the Red Lion Area School District superintendent, who retired the same year.

=== School shooting ===
On April 24, 2003, at the Red Lion Junior High School in Red Lion, 14-year-old James Sheets fatally shot the principal of the school, Eugene Segro, before killing himself.

=== Local venues ===
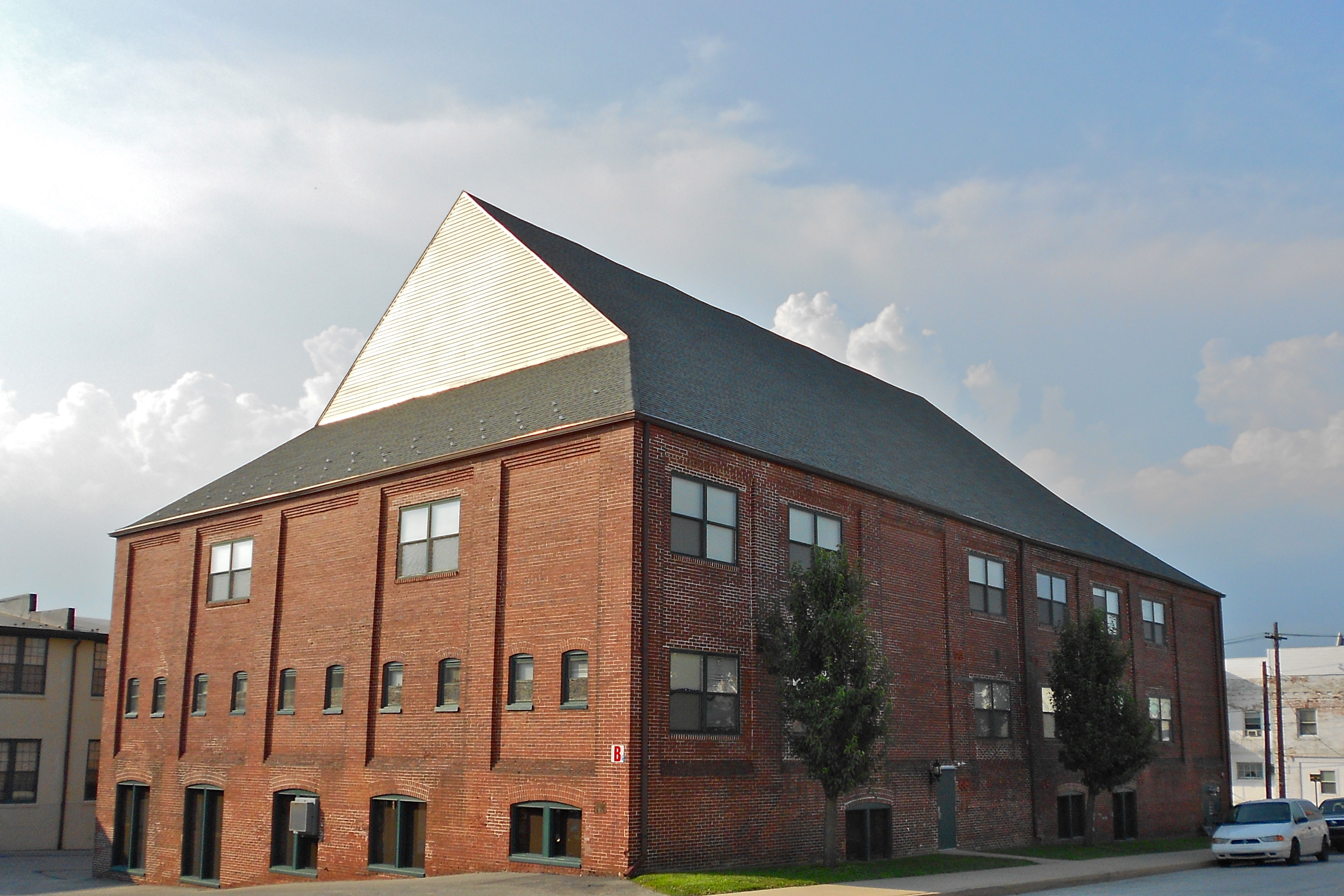
The former opera house

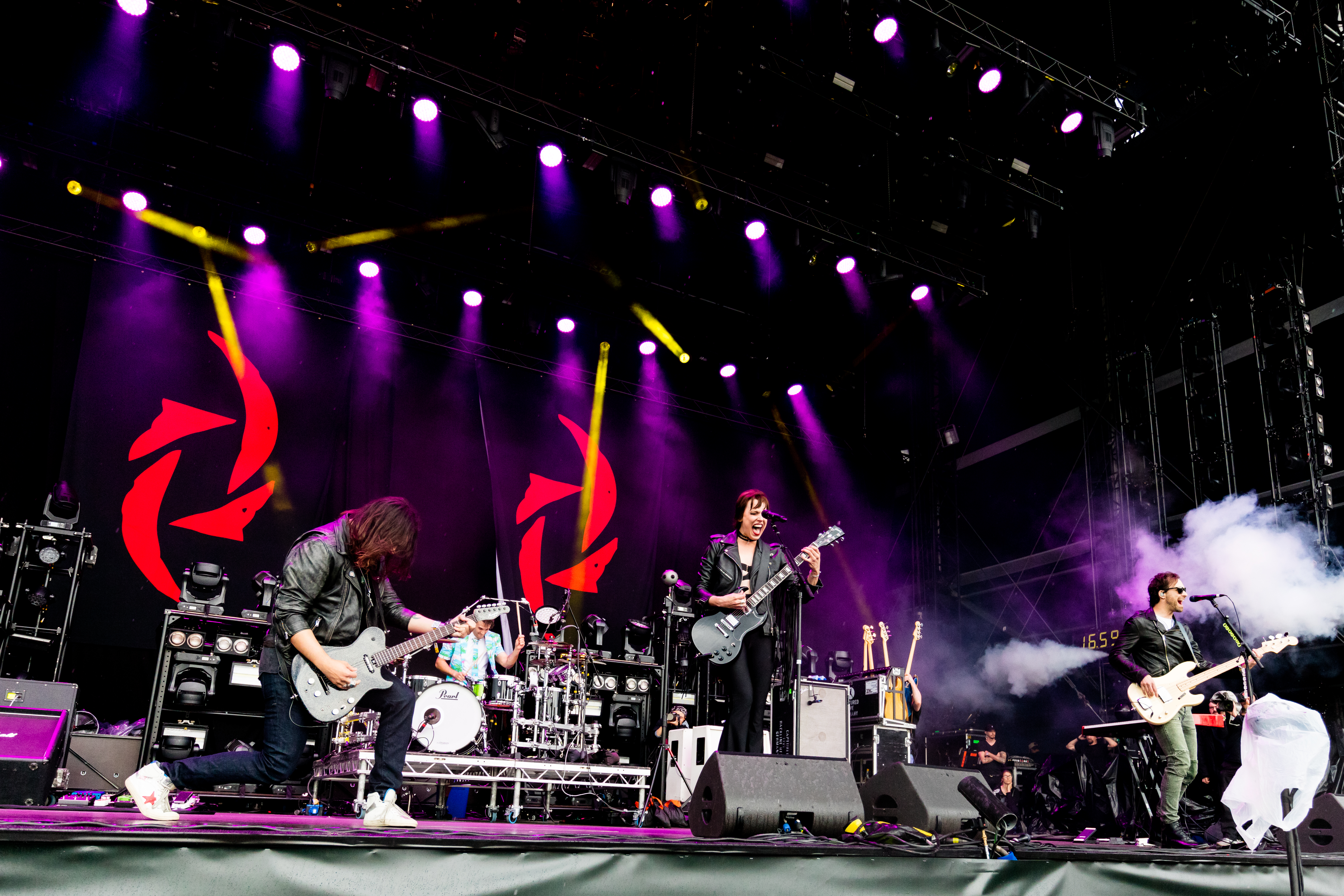
Rock band Halestorm is from Red Lion (2019)

Red Lion has a rich musical heritage. It is the home of the Red Lion Felton band which was first started in 1932 as the Red Lion Concert Band and then later joined with the Felton Band in 1972. The band is composed of local musicians of all ages and performs at many community events.

The Red Lion Area School District has also been awarded the NAMM Foundation's “Best Community for Music Education” from 2012 to 2018 which considers the quality of programs and availability of music education within the schools and community.

Red Lion is also home to an extensive array of local underground bands and independent local artists, perhaps the most popular being Halestorm, who have had six number one U.S. Mainstream Rock hits since 2013.

Red Lion also had a fully functional opera house and a downtown movie theater until the mid-1960s. The opera house has since been converted to housing, and the movie theater was demolished and is now a parking lot.

== Notable people ==
- Scott Fitzkee, former professional American football player (wide receiver)
- Lzzy Hale and her brother Arejay Hale, members of the rock band Halestorm
- Butch Wynegar, former professional baseball player (catcher)
- Fred Murree, Pawnee professional roller skater
- Germar Rudolf, convicted Holocaust denier
