= Hell Is for Children =

1980 song performed by Pat Benatar

"Hell is for Children"

Song by Pat Benatar

from the album Crimes of Passion
- Recorded: 1980
- Studio: Sound City Studios (Van Nuys, CA)
- Genre: Hard rock
- Length: 4:48
- Label: Chrysalis
- Songwriters: Neil Giraldo; Roger Capps; Pat Benatar
- Producer: Keith Olsen

"Hell is for Children" is a hard rock song by American rock singer Pat Benatar. It was written by her guitarist Neil Giraldo, bass player Roger Capps and Benatar. The song is about child abuse and was recorded by Benatar in 1980 for her second studio album Crimes of Passion. While it was not released as an A-side single, it was a hit on album-rock radio stations as it reached number 7 on the Tunecaster Rock Tracks Chart.

Pat Benatar started writing the song after reading a series of articles on child abuse in The New York Times. She was shocked to learn such things happen and wanted to write about it.

A live version of this song from her album Live from Earth (1983) was released as the B-side of her "Love Is a Battlefield" single three years later.

== Cover versions ==
- In 1989, the American thrash metal band Viking covered the song on the B-side of their album Man of Straw.
- In 2000, the American heavy metal band Seven Witches covered the song for their album City of Lost Souls.
- In 2002, the American comic horror metal band Rosemary's Billygoat covered the song for their album Evilution.
- In 2009, the Finnish metal band Children of Bodom covered the song for their cover album Skeletons in the Closet.
- In 2013, the American rock band Halestorm covered the song for their EP Reanimate 2.0: The Covers EP.
- In 2021, the American metal band Unto Others covered the song for their album Strength.
