= Live in Philly 2010 =

Live album by Halestorm
- Released: November 16, 2010
- Recorded: April 30, 2010
- Venue: Theatre of Living Arts (Philadelphia, Pennsylvania)
- Length: 54:01 (CD)
- Label: Atlantic

Halestorm chronology
Halestorm (2009)	Live in Philly 2010 (2010)	ReAniMate: The CoVeRs eP (2011)

Professional ratings
Review scores
Source	Rating
Mojo Radio	(9.8/10)

Live in Philly 2010 is the first live performance released by the rock band Halestorm, and the second album released overall by them. The album was made available for pre–orders on October 21, 2010, and released November 16, 2010. This live performance was recorded at the TLA in Philadelphia, Pennsylvania on April 30, 2010.

== Track listing (CD) ==
No.	Title	Length
1.	"It's Not You"	5:55
2.	"Innocence"	4:14
3.	"Bet U Wish U Had Me Back"	3:34
4.	"Love/Hate Heartbreak"	5:24
5.	"I'm Not An Angel"	4:41
6.	"Familiar Taste of Poison"	5:18
7.	"Boom City"	5:21
8.	"Nothing to Do with Love"	4:08
9.	"Dirty Work"	3:48
10.	"I Get Off"	3:49
11.	"Tell Me Where It Hurts"	4:07
12.	"Better Sorry Than Safe"	3:42
Total length:		54:01

== Track listing (DVD) ==
1. "Intro"
2. "It's Not You"
3. "What Were You Expecting"
4. "Innocence"
5. "Bet U Wish U Had Me Back"
6. "Love/Hate Heartbreak"
7. "I'm Not An Angel"
8. "Familiar Taste of Poison"
9. "Boom City"
10. "Nothing to Do with Love"
11. "Dirty Work"
12. "I Get Off"
13. "Tell Me Where It Hurts"
14. "Better Sorry Than Safe"
