= The Strange Case Of... =

- Standard edition cover. Some editions appear without the band's and album's title.

Studio album by Halestorm
- Released: April 10, 2012
- Recorded: 2011
- Studios: Bay 7 Studios (Valley Village, CA); Sparky Dark Studio (Calabasas, CA); Sunset Sound Studios (Hollywood, CA)
- Genres: Hard rock; heavy metal; alternative metal
- Length: 40:56
- Label: Atlantic
- Producer: Howard Benson

Halestorm chronology
Reanimate: The Covers EP (2011)	The Strange Case Of... (2012)	Reanimate 2.0: The Covers EP (2013)

Singles from The Strange Case Of...
- 1. "Love Bites (So Do I)" Released: January 24, 2012; 2. "I Miss the Misery" Released: July 22, 2012; 3. "Freak Like Me" Released: January 8, 2013; 4. "Here's to Us" Released: May 14, 2013; 5. "Mz. Hyde" Released: October 21, 2013

Professional ratings
Review scores
Source	Rating
411Mania	8.5/10 stars
AllMusic	3/5 stars
aNewRisingMusic	4/5 stars
Classic Rock	2.5/5 stars
Kerrang!	4/5 stars
Live Metal	10/10 stars
Loudwire	4.5/5 stars

The Strange Case Of... is the second studio album by American rock band Halestorm. It was released on April 10, 2012 by Atlantic. The album was produced by Howard Benson, who also produced the band's self-titled debut album. The first single and video from the album "Love Bites (So Do I)" won a Grammy Award for Best Hard Rock/Metal Performance. The song "Freak Like Me" was the band's first single to reach number one on the Mainstream Rock chart. The song "Here's to Us" was performed on the US television show, Glee, with clean lyrics. Four of the album's songs were previously released on the sneak-preview EP Hello, It's Mz. Hyde. A deluxe edition of the album was also released containing three bonus tracks. A different version of the song "Here's to Us" featuring multiple guests including Slash was included as a bonus track on the reissue version of the standard and deluxe version of the album in 2013. In interviews about the album, Hale noted that the album was heavier than their previous album, but was significantly closer to the sound of them live.

The album debuted at No. 7 on Top Rock Albums and No. 15 on the Billboard 200, selling 24,000 copies in its first week. It has sold 1,000,000 copies in the US as of June 2, 2022, certified by the RIAA.

== Track listing ==
No.	Title	Writer(s)	Length
1.	"Love Bites (So Do I)"	Lzzy Hale; Dave Bassett	3:11
2.	"Mz. Hyde"	Hale; Scott Stevens	3:22
3.	"I Miss the Misery"	Hale; Christine Danielle Connolly; Stevens	3:03
4.	"Freak Like Me"	Hale; Johnny Andrews; Rob Graves	3:38
5.	"Beautiful with You"	Hale; Nina Ossoff; Dana Calitri; Maria Sommer	3:16
6.	"In Your Room"	Hale; Zac Maloy	2:46
7.	"Break In"	Hale; Aimée Proal; Graves; Mark L. Holman	4:45
8.	"Rock Show"	Hale; Julian Emery; Jim Irvin	3:19
9.	"Daughters of Darkness"	Hale; Blair Daly	3:55
10.	"You Call Me a Bitch Like It's a Bad Thing"	Hale; Ossoff; Calitri; Martin Briley	3:11
11.	"American Boys"	Hale; Robert Huff	3:28
12.	"Here's to Us"	Hale; Toby Gad; Danielle Brisebois; Brian Connors	2:57
Total length:			40:56

Deluxe edition bonus tracks
No.	Title	Writer(s)	Length
13.	"Don't Know How to Stop"	Hale; Emery; Irvin; Jason Keith Perry	3:55
14.	"Private Parts" (feat. James Michael of Sixx:A.M.)	Hale; James Michael	3:59
15.	"Hate It When You See Me Cry"	Hale	3:11
Total length:			52:01

Japanese edition bonus tracks (taken from Reanimate: The Covers EP)
No.	Title	Writer(s)	Length
13.	"Slave to the Grind" (Skid Row cover)	Sebastian Bach; Rachel Bolan; Dave "The Snake" Sabo	3:31
14.	"Bad Romance" (Lady Gaga cover)	Stefani Germanotta; Nadir Khayat	4:08
15.	"Hunger Strike" (Temple of the Dog cover)	Chris Cornell	3:53
16.	"All I Wanna Do Is Make Love to You" (Heart cover)	Robert John "Mutt" Lange	5:02
17.	"I Want You (She's So Heavy)" (The Beatles cover)	John Lennon; Paul McCartney	6:49
Total length:			68:34

Reissue edition bonus track
No.	Title	Writer(s)	Length
13.	"Here's to Us (Guest Version)" (feat. Slash, Wolfgang Van Halen, Brent Smith, Myles Kennedy, James Michael, Tyler Connolly, David Draiman, and Maria Brink)	Hale; Gad; Brisebois	3:15
Total length:			44:11

== Hello, It's Mz. Hyde EP ==
The band released an EP before the album release of four of the songs set to appear on The Strange Case Of....

No.	Title	Length
1.	"Love Bites (So Do I)"
2.	"Rock Show"
3.	"Daughters of Darkness"
4.	"Here's to Us"
Total length:		13:28

== Personnel ==
Credits adapted from the liner notes of The Strange Case Of....

Band members

- Lzzy Hale – lead vocals, rhythm guitar, piano
- Joe Hottinger – lead guitar, backing vocals
- Josh Smith – bass guitar, backing vocals
- Arejay Hale – drums, percussion, backing vocals

Additional personnel

Musicians

- Wolfgang Van Halen – background vocals
- Myles Kennedy – guitar
- Slash – guitar
- Phil X – guitar
- Howard Benson – keyboards
- Lenny Skolnik – keyboards
- Jamie Muhoberac – piano
- Maria Brink – background vocals
- Tyler Connolly – background vocals
- David Draiman – background vocals
- Myles Kennedy – background vocals
- James Michael – background vocals
- Brent Smith – background vocals

Artistry

- Alex Kirzhner – art direction, design, photography
- Hikari Tezuka – hair stylist
- Lucky Smyler – make-up
- Chris Phelps – photography
- Mody Al Khufash – stylist

Production

- Anne Declemente – A&R, administration
- Pete Ganbarg – A&R
- Paul DeCarli – digital editing, engineer
- Jon Nicholson – drum technician
- Jimmy Fahey – engineer
- Hatsukazu "Hatch" Inagaki – engineer
- James Michael – engineer
- Mike Plotnikoff – engineer
- Marc VanGool – guitar technician
- Ted Jensen – mastering
- Chris Lord-Alge – mixing
- Brian Ranney – packaging
- Howard Benson – producer, programming
- Lenny Skolnik – programming

== Charts ==
=== Weekly charts ===
Chart (2012–2023)	Peak position
Hungarian Albums (MAHASZ)	26
UK Albums (OCC)	49
UK Rock and Metal Albums (OCC)	2
Japanese Albums Chart (Oricon)	52
US Billboard 200	15
US Top Rock Albums (Billboard)	7
US Hard Rock Albums (Billboard)	1
US Alternative Albums (Billboard)	6
US Top Digital Albums (Billboard)	15
US Top Tastemaker Albums (Billboard)	21

=== Year-end charts ===
Chart (2012)	Position
US Hard Rock Albums (Billboard)	12
US Rock Albums (Billboard)	59
US Alternative Albums (Billboard)	44
Chart (2013)	Position
US Hard Rock Albums (Billboard)	12
US Rock Albums (Billboard)	69

== Certifications ==
Region	Certification	Certified units/sales
United Kingdom (BPI)	Gold	100,000^{‡}
United States (RIAA)	Platinum	1,000,000^{‡}
^{‡} Sales+streaming figures based on certification alone.
