= Can U See Me In the Dark? =

2024 song by Halestorm and I Prevail

Single by Halestorm and I Prevail
- Released: June 6, 2024
- Genre: Hard rock
- Length: 3:58
- Label: Atlantic
- Songwriters: Lzzy Hale; Joe Hottinger; Josh Smith; Arejay Hale; Eric Vanlerberghe; Steve Menoian; Gabe Helguera; Jon Eberhard; Tyler Smyth
- Producer: Smyth

Halestorm singles chronology
"Wicked Ways" (2022)	"Can U See Me In the Dark?" (2024)	"Darkness Always Wins" (2025)

I Prevail singles chronology
"Closure" (2023)	"Can U See Me In the Dark?" (2024)	"Hate This Song (with All Time Low)" (2024)

"Can U See Me In the Dark?" is a song by American rock bands Halestorm and I Prevail. It was released on June 6, 2024, as a standalone single through Atlantic Records. The song topped the Billboard Mainstream Rock Airplay chart in September 2024.

== Background and release ==
According to Lzzy Hale, the song was written in celebration of Halestorm and I Prevail's 2024 co-headlining tour and for the bands' collective fanbase. She said the bands wanted to create "a haven" and "sanctuary" where people from different walks of life and with different influences could come together. Hale added that the song was written to let listeners know they are "seen" and "not alone" through "life's myriad of joy and pain". I Prevail frontman Eric Vanlerberghe said the band focused on creating a music bed that reflected I Prevail's sound while allowing Hale to "shine" and "do what she does best".

The song was released on June 6, 2024, alongside a lyric video. An official performance video for the song was released on October 4, 2024.

== Composition ==
Jon Hadusek of Consequence wrote that the song's metalcore production leans more toward I Prevail's typical sound, while its stadium-rock chorus plays to Hale's strengths. Hadusek noted that Hale and Vanlerberghe perform as a harmonized duet for much of the song.

== Reception ==
Gregory Adams of Revolver described the song as an "anthemic rocker" that combines I Prevail's "synth-skittery breakdowns" and "growly melodies" with Hale's "full-bore metal yellin'". Rich Hobson of Metal Hammer wrote that the song features Hale's vocals over arena-ready riffs before transitioning to an electro-metalcore breakdown in its final minute. Matt Mills of the same publication later described the song as an "electronic-tinged modern metal" track.

The song was ranked No. 31 on Metal Hammer's list of the 50 best metal songs of 2024, with Hobson describing it as a "hard rock anthem".

== Track listing ==
"Can U See Me In the Dark?" single
No.	Title	Length
1.	"Can U See Me In the Dark?"	3:58

Notes

- Track 1 is stylized in all lowercase.

== Live performances ==
The song received its live debut on July 9, 2024, when Hale joined I Prevail onstage at the opening show of the bands' co-headlining North American tour at Coastal Credit Union Music Park in Raleigh, North Carolina.

== Chart performance ==
The song reached number one on the Billboard Mainstream Rock Airplay chart dated September 28, 2024. It became Halestorm's seventh and I Prevail's third number-one song on the chart. The song was the first Mainstream Rock Airplay number-one by two multi-person acts since Metallica and the San Francisco Symphony's "All Within My Hands" in 2020.

== Personnel ==
Credits adapted from Apple Music.

Halestorm

- Lzzy Hale – lead vocals, rhythm guitar, piano, synthesizer
- Arejay Hale – drums, backing vocals
- Joe Hottinger – lead guitar, backing vocals, synthesizer
- Josh Smith – bass, backing vocals, synthesizer, piano

I Prevail

- Eric Vanlerberghe – lead vocals

Additional musicians

- Jon Eberhard – programming
- Tyler Smyth – programming

Production and engineering

- Tyler Smyth – producer, mixing engineer
- Jon Eberhard – engineer, assistant producer
- Ted Jensen – mastering engineer

== Charts ==
=== Weekly charts ===
Weekly chart performance for "Can U See Me In the Dark?"
Chart (2024)	Peak position
Canada Rock (Billboard)	39
Canada Mainstream Rock (Billboard Canada)	21
US Rock & Alternative Airplay (Billboard)	8
US Mainstream Rock Airplay (Billboard)	1

=== Year-end charts ===
Year-end chart performance for "Can U See Me In the Dark?"
Chart (2024)	Position
US Mainstream Rock Airplay (Billboard)	16

Chart (2025)	Position
Canada Mainstream Rock (Billboard)	54
