= Vicious (Halestorm album) =

Studio album by Halestorm
- Released: July 27, 2018
- Studio: Rock Falcon
- Genres: Hard rock; glam metal; pop metal
- Length: 43:26
- Label: Atlantic
- Producer: Nick Raskulinecz

Halestorm chronology
Reanimate 3.0: The Covers EP (2017)	Vicious (2018)	Back from the Dead (2022)

Singles from Vicious
- 1. "Uncomfortable" Released: May 30, 2018; 2. "Black Vultures" Released: June 22, 2018; 3. "Do Not Disturb" Released: July 20, 2018; 4. "Vicious" Released: March 28, 2019

Vicious is the fourth studio album by American rock band Halestorm. It was released on July 27, 2018, through Atlantic Records. Four singles were released, three of them having a music video. The video for the lead single "Uncomfortable" was directed by Evan Brace.

The album peaked at number 8 on the Billboard 200 and topped both the US and UK Rock Albums charts.

== Background and production ==
The American rock band Halestorm released their third studio album, Into the Wild Life, on April 10, 2015. This was followed up with 2017's Reanimate 3.0: The Covers EP, produced by Nick Raskulinecz. The band ended up discarding 15 songs, as frontwoman Lzzy Hale became displeased with the material out of fear that she was "paying way too much attention to making everybody happy." The band reunited with Raskulinecz in Nashville, Tennessee's Rock Falcon studio for what began as a series of live jam sessions. By February 2018, Hale announced that the new album was "almost done," and that Halestorm had "about two or three weeks left of recording just to put the cherries on top."

== Composition and lyrics ==
Lzzy Hale commented to Blabbermouth.net:

"In my opinion, this is gonna be the first record… And we always say this, we hope we get better as musicians as we go on, with each record. But this is gonna be the first record where you can really hear all four corners of Halestorm and what makes us a band. And if any of you have ever seen us live, I think this is the closest to what you see when you see us live. In a lot of these records that we put out, 'Okay, we have a catchy song, and I sing on it,' and then that's about it. So there's so many different layers to this record that I'm so proud to show everybody."

When discussing the album artwork with Sound Vapors, Joe Hottinger said:

“We wanted to create some sort of imagery that maybe spoke to somebody. Is it a woman, like struggling through the gauntlet of the industry or is it a woman enjoying all these hands on her? Or is it commentary on current events? There’s no answer. It’s an image to create questions.”

== Release and promotion ==
Halestorm announced the details of their new album, including the name, track list, and release date, on May 30, 2018. The announcement was accompanied by the album's first single, "Uncomfortable", and a music video directed by Evan Brace, who previously directed videos for Phantogram and Taking Back Sunday. On June 22, the band released "Black Vultures." The last pre-album single, "Do Not Disturb," was released on July 20, a week before Vicious. The song was accompanied by a video directed by Robert Schober, also known as Roboshobo, who previously worked with Metallica, Alice in Chains, Mastodon, Disturbed, and Green Day.

To promote Vicious, Halestorm went on tour with support from In This Moment and New Year's Day, a decision that Lzzy Hale said was made because "It's important to realize that music is gender-less." Hottinger says, "We were told by the third show [on the tour] that there were more females buying tickets than males, which in hard rock, we have never seen before."

== Reception ==
=== Critical reception ===
Professional ratings
Aggregate scores
Source	Rating
Metacritic	81/100
Review scores
Source	Rating
AllMusic	3.5/5 stars
Daily Express	4/5 stars
Metal Hammer	3/5 stars
Metal Injection	7/10
The Times	3/5 stars
Stereoboard	4/5 stars

Vicious has received a score of 81 on Metacritic based on four reviews indicating "universal acclaim", making it the band's highest scoring album on the site. James Christopher Monger at AllMusic wrote that "The holy hard rock trinity of sex, drugs, and rock & roll is alive and well -- but it connects on such a visceral and familiar level that listeners will likely be unable to resist the urge to turn things up to 11." Stephen Dalton of Classic Rock wrote, "Sounding at times like a fire-breathing she-dragon, Hale has a flair for lyrically deft rebel-girl songs that wear their feminist credentials lightly." Paul Davies of the Daily Express wrote, "There are more hooks, delicious vocals and musicianship here to reel in both avid fans and casual listeners.

=== Commercial performance ===
Vicious debuted at number eight on the US Billboard 200 chart, recording 29,000 album-equivalent units in its first week. As of November 2021, the album has earned 140,000 equivalent album units in the US.

=== Accolades ===
Loudwire included Vicious at number five on their year-end list of the "30 Best Hard Rock Albums of 2018." Classic Rock also put Vicious at number five on their list of the "50 Best Albums Of 2018."

"Uncomfortable" was nominated for Best Rock Performance at the 2019 Grammy Awards, losing to Chris Cornell's "When Bad Does Good."

== Track listing ==
All tracks are produced by Nick Raskulinecz.

No.	Title	Writer(s)	Length
1.	"Black Vultures"	Lzzy Hale; Joe Hottinger; Brian Vodinh	4:10
2.	"Skulls"	L. Hale; Josh Smith; Hottinger; Arejay Hale	3:19
3.	"Uncomfortable"	L. Hale; Smith; Hottinger; A. Hale	3:40
4.	"Buzz"	L. Hale; Smith; Hottinger; A. Hale	3:22
5.	"Do Not Disturb"	L. Hale; Smith; Hottinger; A. Hale	3:23
6.	"Conflicted"	L. Hale; Hottinger; Ingrid Andress; Andre Davidson; Michael Pollack; Stephen Puth	3:29
7.	"Killing Ourselves to Live"	L. Hale; Smith; Hottinger; A. Hale	4:00
8.	"Heart of Novocaine"	L. Hale; Smith; Hottinger; A. Hale	3:33
9.	"Painkiller"	L. Hale; Hottinger; Scott Stevens	3:13
10.	"White Dress"	L. Hale; Hottinger; Andrew Goldstein; Dan Book	3:29
11.	"Vicious"	L. Hale; Hottinger; Kevin Churko; Kane Churko	3:01
12.	"The Silence"	L. Hale; Hottinger	4:47
Total length:			43:26

Walmart edition bonus tracks
No.	Title	Writer(s)	Length
13.	"Nobody"	L. Hale; Smith; Hottinger; A. Hale	4:12
14.	"Letters"	L. Hale; Smith; Hottinger; A. Hale	5:19
Total length:			52:57

Vinyl edition bonus tracks
No.	Title	Writer(s)	Length
13.	"Now That You're Gone"	L. Hale; Smith; Hottinger; A. Hale	2:51
14.	"Nobody"	L. Hale; Smith; Hottinger; A. Hale	4:12
15.	"Golden"	L. Hale; Smith; Hottinger; A. Hale	4:13
16.	"Letters"	L. Hale; Smith; Hottinger; A. Hale	5:19
Total length:			60:01

Japanese edition bonus tracks
No.	Title	Writer(s)	Length
13.	"Tokyo"	L. Hale; Smith; Hottinger; A. Hale	3:46
14.	"Love Bites (So Do I)" (Live in Philly^{[a]} 2015)	L. Hale; Dave Bassett	3:33
Total length:			50:55

Notes

- ^{^[a]} Though listed as being recorded in Philadelphia, the track was actually recorded in Camden, New Jersey.

== Personnel ==
=== Halestorm ===
- Lzzy Hale – vocals, guitar, piano, synths, talk box on "Buzz"
- Arejay Hale – drums, backing vocals
- Joe Hottinger – lead guitar, backing vocals, synths
- Josh Smith – bass guitar, piano, backing vocals, synths

=== Additional credits ===
- Suzi Akyuz – product manager
- David Brown – guitar technician
- Rock Falcon – drum technician
- Jimmy Fontaine – photography
- Ted Jensen – mastering
- Nik Karpen – mixing assistance
- Alex Kirzhner – creative direction and design
- Jordan Logue – assistance
- Chris Lord-Alge – mixing
- Brian Ranney – packaging manager
- Nick Raskulinecz – producer
- Scott Stevens – additional production
- Nathan Yarborough – engineering

== Charts ==
Chart (2018)	Peak position
Australian Albums (ARIA)	16
Austrian Albums (Ö3 Austria)	34
Belgian Albums (Ultratop Flanders)	26
Belgian Albums (Ultratop Wallonia)	88
Canadian Albums (Billboard)	14
Dutch Albums (Album Top 100)	53
German Albums (Offizielle Top 100)	27
Japanese Albums (Oricon)	80
New Zealand Albums (RMNZ)	32
Scottish Albums (Official Charts)	6
Spanish Albums (PROMUSICAE)	63
Swiss Albums (Schweizer Hitparade)	10
UK Albums (Official Charts)	8
UK Rock & Metal Albums (Official Charts)	1
US Billboard 200	8
US Top Rock Albums (Billboard)	1
US Top Hard Rock Albums (Billboard)	1

== Stripped EP ==
Almost two years after the release of the album, the band debuted the Vicious (Stripped) EP for Record Store day 2020. The album features acoustic versions of four songs from the album as well as an acoustic version of "Chemicals", which was released as a non album promo single the previous year.

No.	Title	Length
1.	"Black Vultures" (Stripped)	3:55
2.	"Do Not Disturb" (Stripped)	3:21
3.	"Chemicals" (Stripped)	4:30
4.	"Heart of Novacaine" (Stripped)	3:25
5.	"The Silence" (Stripped)	4:47
Total length:		19:58
