= Reanimate: The Covers EP =

ReAniMate: The CoVeRs eP

EP by Halestorm
- Released: March 22, 2011
- Recorded: 2010
- Studios: After 7 Studios (Mechanicsburg, PA)
- Length: 27:37
- Label: Atlantic
- Producer: Bobby Huff

Halestorm chronology
Live in Philly 2010 (2010)	ReAniMate: The CoVeRs eP (2011)	The Strange Case Of... (2012)

ReAniMate: The CoVeRs eP is the fifth EP by the American rock band Halestorm. It is the first cover EP by the band. It was released on March 22, 2011 as a digital download. A follow-up EP, Reanimate 2.0: The Covers EP, was released on October 15, 2013. The EP features six songs. It peaked at number 20 on the Billboard hard rock albums chart.

== Tracklist ==
No.	Title	Writer(s)	Originally performed by	Length
1.	"Slave to the Grind"	Sebastian Bach, Rachel Bolan, Dave Sabo	Skid Row	3:31
2.	"Bad Romance"	RedOne, Lady Gaga	Lady Gaga	4:08
3.	"Hunger Strike"	Chris Cornell	Temple of the Dog	3:53
4.	"Out ta Get Me"	Axl Rose, Izzy Stradlin, Slash	Guns N' Roses	4:14
5.	"All I Wanna Do Is Make Love to You"	Robert John "Mutt" Lange	Heart	5:02
6.	"I Want You (She's So Heavy)"	John Lennon, Paul McCartney	The Beatles	6:49
Total length:				27:37

== Personnel ==
- Lzzy Hale – Lead Vocals, Rhythm and Lead Guitar, Keyboard
- Arejay Hale – Drums, Percussion, Backing Vocals
- Joe Hottinger – Lead Guitar, Backing Vocals
- Josh Smith – Bass guitar, Backing Vocals
