= I Get Off =

2009 debut single by Halestorm

Single by Halestorm

from the album Halestorm
- Released: March 10, 2009
- Genre: Hard rock
- Length: 3:02
- Label: Atlantic
- Songwriters: Dana Calitri; Howard Benson; Kathy Sommer; Lzzy Hale; Nina Ossoff
- Producer: Howard Benson

Halestorm singles chronology
"I Get Off" (2009)	"It's Not You" (2009)

"I Get Off" is the debut single by American hard rock band Halestorm, released on March 10, 2009, from their 2009 self-titled debut album. The song was written by lead singer Lzzy Hale with its producer, Howard Benson, and Dana Calitri, Kathy Sommer, and Nina Ossoff. Lyrically, the song describes deriving pleasure from sexual exhibitionism.

== Critical reception ==
Tim Grierson of About.com wrote that "I Get Off" is "low-grade stripper-rock" that finds Hale "belting her sexual devotion in a rather unappealing way". Nick at TuneLab conversely described the song as "instantly catchy" and wrote that "its ever-building verses blending seamlessly into soaring choruses".

== Commercial performance ==
"I Get Off" reached number 6 on the Billboard Mainstream Rock airplay chart, earning the band their first top-ten single. It additionally reached number 17 on the magazine's Hot Rock & Alternative Songs chart and number 28 on the Alternative Airplay chart. The song remains their only single to impact the latter chart. In October 2023, the song was certified Platinum by the Recording Industry Association of America (RIAA) for combined sales and streams of over 1,000,000 equivalent units.

== Music video ==
The video for "I Get Off" was directed by Phil Mucci and premiered October 2, 2009. It shows the band playing in a room and shows the lead singer, Lzzy Hale, in a secret room being watched by a male.

== Other appearances ==
In November 2017, "I Get Off" was made available as a playable song for the music rhythm game, Rocksmith 2014. "I Get Off" was one of five songs re-recorded for the band's 2020 extended play, Reimagined, that saw the group re-interpreting their earlier recordings.

== Charts ==
=== Weekly charts ===
Weekly chart performance for "I Get Off"
Chart (2009)	Peak position
US Hot Rock & Alternative Songs (Billboard)	17

=== Year-end charts ===
Year-end chart performance for "I Get Off"
Chart (2009)	Position
US Hot Rock Songs (Billboard)	44

== Certifications ==
Certifications for "I Get Off"
Region	Certification	Certified units/sales
Canada (Music Canada)	Gold	40,000^{‡}
United States (RIAA)	Platinum	1,000,000^{‡}
^{‡} Sales+streaming figures based on certification alone.
