= Reanimate 2.0: The Covers EP =

ReAniMate 2.0: The CoVeRs eP

EP by Halestorm
- Released: October 15, 2013
- Recorded: February 2013
- Studio: West Valley (Woodland Hills, California); Sparky Dark (Calabasas, California); Blackbird (Nashville, Tennessee)
- Genre: Hard rock, alternative metal
- Length: 24:45
- Label: Atlantic
- Producer: Howard Benson, Mike Plotnikoff, Halestorm

Halestorm chronology
The Strange Case Of... (2012)	ReAniMate 2.0: The CoVeRs eP (2013)	Into the Wild Life (2015)

Professional ratings
Review scores
Source	Rating
AllMusic	3/5 stars
Loudwire	4/5 stars
PureGrainAudio	7.5/10
ThisIsNotAScene	7/10 stars

ReAniMate 2.0: The CoVeRs eP is an EP by the American rock band Halestorm. It was released in the United States on October 15, 2013 as a follow-up to ReAniMate: The CoVeRs eP (2011). ReAniMate 2.0 features Halestorm's covers of six songs, all from different artists.

== Track listing ==
No.	Title	Writer(s)	Originally performed by	Length
1.	"Dissident Aggressor"	Rob Halford, K. K. Downing, Glenn Tipton	Judas Priest	3:12
2.	"Get Lucky"	Thomas Bangalter, Guy-Manuel de Homem-Christo, Pharrell Williams, Nile Rodgers	Daft Punk	3:08
3.	"Shoot to Thrill"	Brian Johnson, Angus Young, Malcolm Young	AC/DC	5:07
4.	"Hell Is for Children"	Pat Benatar, Roger Capps, Neil Giraldo	Pat Benatar	4:46
5.	"Gold Dust Woman"	Stevie Nicks	Fleetwood Mac	4:10
6.	"1996"	Brian Hugh Warner, Jeordie White	Marilyn Manson	4:22
Total length:				24:45

== Personnel ==
Per liner notes

Halestorm

- Lzzy Hale – vocals, guitar
- Arejay Hale – drums
- Joe Hottinger – guitars
- Josh Smith – bass guitar

Recording personnel

- Howard Benson – producer; keyboards and programming on "Get Lucky"
- Mike Plotnikoff – producer, mixing engineer, recording engineer
- Chris Lord-Alge – mixing on "Get Lucky"
- Hatsukazu "Hatch" Inagaki – additional engineering
- Paul DeCarli – additional engineering and digital editing; programming on "1996"
- Ernesto Olvera – assistant engineer
- Keith Armstrong – assistant engineer
- Nik Karpen – assistant engineer
- Brad Townsend – assistant engineer
- Andrew Schubert – assistant engineer
- Ted Jensen – mastering engineer

== Chart positions ==
Chart (2013)	Peak position
US Billboard 200	40
US Top Rock Albums	14
US Hard Rock Albums	5
US Alternative Albums	11
