= Everest (album) =

Studio album by Halestorm
- Released: August 8, 2025
- Studios: Georgia Mae Studios, Tha Dark Garden
- Genres: Hard rock; heavy metal
- Length: 48:31
- Label: Atlantic
- Producer: Dave Cobb

Halestorm chronology
Back from the Dead (2022)	Everest (2025)

Singles from Everest
- 1. "Everest" Released: May 30, 2025; 2. "Darkness Always Wins" Released: June 26, 2025; 3. "Rain Your Blood On Me" Released: July 10, 2025; 4. "Like A Woman Can" Released: August 8, 2025

Everest is the sixth studio album by American rock band Halestorm. It was released on August 8, 2025, through Atlantic Records. The album was preceded by the singles "Darkness Always Wins", "Everest", and "Rain Your Blood on Me."

== Background and production ==
Unlike some of their previous albums, the members of Halestorm wrote Everest from scratch in the studio. Many of the album's lyrics are informed by singer/guitarist Lzzy Hale's newfound sobriety, recovery from mental health difficulties, and reassessment of mistakes made during her younger years. Topical issues include Hale's experiences as a woman leading a rock group with male band mates in "Rain Your Blood on Me" and bisexuality in "Like a Woman Can."

== Critical reception ==
Everest received generally favorable reviews from critics. Kerrang! noted that the album is a departure from the band's previous works and longtime fans may need time to digest some of the stylistic changes, but concluded that the album's heavier songs are "surely the most frenetic, furious songs in this band’s game" while the more complex songs are "as epic in scale as they are creative in delivery." Classic Rock magazine described the album as the first in Halestorm's discography to fully replicate their live sound, with the band eschewing most outside assistance and showing more improvisational songwriting and recording; with unexpected influences from producer Dave Cobb who is mostly known for producing country artists.

Metal Hammer called the album “Easily the band’s boldest work to date, boasting some of their most interesting songs yet” and noted that some of the songs are unique in the band's history, such as the complex title track and the thrash-like "K-I-L-L-I-N-G." Glide Magazine noted that the album continues the band's typical hard rock sound but "strayed from the formula and found many ways to utilize the band’s talents," while adding more complex guitar work from Lzzy Hale and Joe Hottinger. Rock News praised the album as "a sonic summit, blending the band’s signature intensity with unexpected detours into soul, country, and cinematic soundscapes." Static Noise praised the passion of the lyrics and musical performances, calling the album "emotional, explosive, messy, melodic, cathartic, and honest in a way that feels like they ripped it straight from the depths of their souls."

Amped noted that "This isn’t just another solid Halestorm record, it’s their most daring, emotional, and flat-out impressive work yet." The magazine added, however, that the varied musical styles displayed on the album do not always mesh together. Riff magazine noted that the album's power comes from both its heaviest and quietest moments, but critiqued some of the stylistic experiments. Blabbermouth noted that the album continues to highlights the vocal talents of Lzzy Hale but showcases the other members of the band more than their previous releases.

== Track listing ==
All tracks are written by Lzzy Hale, Arejay Hale, Joe Hottinger, Josh Smith and Dave Cobb, with additional writers noted.

Everest track listing
No.	Title	Writer(s)	Length
1.	"Fallen Star"	Aaron Raitiere	4:33
2.	"Everest"	Amy Wadge	4:48
3.	"Shiver"	Dave Pittenger	3:51
4.	"Like a Woman Can"	Ryan Daly; Nolan Sipe	4:22
5.	"Rain Your Blood on Me"	Raitiere	4:15
6.	"Darkness Always Wins"	Raitiere	4:50
7.	"Gather the Lambs"	Raitiere	3:54
8.	"Watch Out!"		3:38
9.	"Broken Doll"	Raitiere	3:24
10.	"K-I-L-L-I-N-G"	Raitiere	2:36
11.	"I Gave You Everything"		4:31
12.	"How Will You Remember Me?"	Natalie Hemby	3:56
Total length:			48:31

== Personnel ==
Credits adapted from the album's liner notes.

=== Halestorm ===
- Lzzy Hale – vocals, guitar, piano, synthesizer, vocal production on "Everest" and "Watch Out!", art direction
- Arejay Hale – drums, vocals, percussion, art direction
- Joe Hottinger – lead guitar, vocals, synthesizer, art direction, vocal production on "How Will You Remember Me?"
- Josh Smith – bass guitar, piano, vocals, synthesizer, art direction

=== Additional contributors ===
- Dave Cobb – production
- Greg Gordon – engineering
- Ethan Barrette – engineering assistance
- Rich Costey – mixing
- Ted Jensen – mastering
- David Pittenger – vocal production on "Shiver"
- Nolan Ryan – vocal production on "Like a Woman Can"
- Welder Wings – illustration
- David Seidman – alternate cover illustration
- Jimmy Fontaine – photography
- Alex Kirzhner – art direction
- Virgilio Tzaj – design

== Charts ==
Chart performance for Everest
Chart (2025)	Peak position
Austrian Albums (Ö3 Austria)	10
Belgian Albums (Ultratop Flanders)	174
Belgian Albums (Ultratop Wallonia)	88
French Albums (SNEP)	138
French Rock & Metal Albums (SNEP)	9
German Albums (Offizielle Top 100)	30
Hungarian Physical Albums (MAHASZ)	17
Japanese Rock Albums (Oricon)	9
Japanese Top Albums Sales (Billboard Japan)	60
Japanese Western Albums (Oricon)	11
Scottish Albums (Official Charts)	4
Swedish Albums (Sverigetopplistan)	47
Swiss Albums (Schweizer Hitparade)	9
UK Albums (Official Charts)	16
UK Rock & Metal Albums (Official Charts)	1
US Billboard 200	156
US Top Rock & Alternative Albums (Billboard)	38
