= Love Bites (So Do I) =

Single by Halestorm

from the album The Strange Case Of...
- Released: January 24, 2012
- Recorded: 2011
- Genre: Heavy metal; pop-punk
- Length: 3:11
- Label: Atlantic
- Songwriters: Lzzy Hale; Dave Bassett

Halestorm singles chronology
"Bet U Wish U Had Me Back" (2010)	"Love Bites (So Do I)" (2012)	"I Miss the Misery" (2012)

Music video
- "Love Bites (So Do I)" on YouTube

"Love Bites (So Do I)" is a song by American rock band Halestorm. It was released on January 24, 2012, as the first single from their second album The Strange Case Of.... It is also part of the Guitar Hero Live soundtrack.

== Background ==
The band members have stated that "Love Bites" was influenced by their cover of Skid Row's song "Slave to the Grind" and Lamb of God. Lzzy Hale also mentioned on an episode of That Metal Show that thrash metal bands like Megadeth and Anthrax were influences for the song.

== Reception ==
The song elicited a positive reaction from music critics. Gregory Heaney, in his AllMusic review of the song's parent album, praised vocalist Lzzy Hale's vocal performance, commenting that they were "adding the right amount of snarl and grit"; he also called the song "aggressive". Steve Beebee, of Kerrang!, was also positive toward the song, stating that the song "is as storming an opener as anyone could wish for", also feeling that Hale "flex(es) her remarkable vocal muscles" on the song. Live Metal's Greg Maki called the song an "all-out metallic assault". An album review by Loudwire commented that the song "is the perfect representation of Halestorm and a great showcase of frontwoman Lzzy Hale's voice and badass wit".

Japanese all-female metal band Lovebites derived their name from the song.

=== Accolades ===
At the 2013 Grammy Awards, the song received the award for Best Hard Rock/Metal Performance.

== Music video ==
A music video for the song, directed by Jeremy Alter, was released on February 14, 2012.

== Charts ==
=== Weekly charts ===
Weekl chart performance for "Love Bites (So Do I)"
Chart (2012)	Peak position
US Hot Rock & Alternative Songs (Billboard)	16

=== Year-end charts ===
Year-end chart performance for "Love Bites (So Do I)"
Chart (2012)	Position
US Hot Rock Songs (Billboard)	56

== Certifications ==
Certifications for "Love Bites (So Do I)"
Region	Certification	Certified units/sales
United States (RIAA)	Gold	500,000^{‡}
^{‡} Sales+streaming figures based on certification alone.
