= One and Done (EP) =

EP by Halestorm
- Released: April 28, 2006
- Length: 19:58
- Label: Atlantic

Halestorm chronology
One and Done (2006)	Halestorm (2009)

One and Done is a live EP by the American rock band Halestorm. It was released on April 28, 2006 through Atlantic Records. The EP is the band's first release on a major record label and also the first release in its current line-up. It's the band's fourth overall EP.

== Track list ==
All songs written by Halestorm.

No.	Title	Length
1.	"It's Not You"	3:43
2.	"The Hand"	3:42
3.	"Show Me"	4:12
4.	"Blue Eyes"	4:18
5.	"Takes My Life"	4:03
Total length:		19:58

== Personnel ==
- Lzzy Hale – Lead Vocals, Rhythm and Lead Guitar, Keyboard
- Arejay Hale – Drums, Percussion, Backing Vocals
- Joe Hottinger – Lead Guitar, Backing Vocals
- Josh Smith – Bass guitar, Backing Vocals
