= Halestorm (album) =

- Standard and deluxe editions cover

Studio album by Halestorm
- Released: April 28, 2009
- Recorded: 2006–2009
- Studio: Bay 7 Studios (Valley Village, Los Angeles); Sparky Dark Studio (Calabasas, California); Entourage Studios (North Hollywood, Los Angeles) (Note: Strings on tracks 5 and 6)
- Genre: Hard rock; post-grunge
- Length: 37:03
- Label: Atlantic
- Producer: Howard Benson

Halestorm chronology
One and Done (2006)	Halestorm (2009)	Live in Philly 2010 (2010)

Alternative cover
- 10th anniversary edition cover

Singles from Halestorm
- 1. "I Get Off" Released: March 10, 2009; 2. "It's Not You" Released: 2009; 3. "Love/Hate Heartbreak" Released: 2010; 4. "Familiar Taste of Poison" Released: 2010

Professional ratings
Review scores
Source	Rating
AllMusic	3.5/5 stars
Dangerdog.com	4.74 stars on a 5 point scale
Jukebox:Metal	2/5 stars
Kerrang!	4/5 stars
Rock Sound	6/10 stars
TuneLab	9/10 stars

Halestorm is the debut studio album by American rock band Halestorm. It was released on April 28, 2009 by Atlantic Records. The record was produced by Howard Benson and includes a collaboration with Evanescence's former member Ben Moody as a co-writer on the track "Innocence". Halestorm received generally mixed reviews from music critics. Commercially, the album was a modest success, debuting at number 40 on the US Billboard 200 and was certified gold by the RIAA. The first single from the album, "I Get Off" received considerable play time and peaked at 17 on the Billboard Hot Rock & Alternative Songs chart. The 10th Anniversary Edition was released on December 20, 2019.

== 10th Anniversary Edition ==
The band celebrated the tenth anniversary of the album's release by releasing a 10th Anniversary Edition featuring "all-new artwork as well as pre-production demos and bonus material."

In a statement announcing the reissue of Halestorm, Lzzy Hale said: "We lived through a fire, a mudslide, an earthquake and 19 months in Burbank, California to make sure our debut album was released. To celebrate our 10th year anniversary of our debut album on Atlantic Records, we decided to include raw, never-before-heard demos and rejects, new art, and a personal letter from me taking you through our roller-coaster ride. I hope you enjoy this special piece of Halestorm history."

== Track listing ==
It's Not You single cover

All tracks are produced by Howard Benson.

No.	Title	Writer(s)	Length
1.	"It's Not You"	Lzzy Hale; Howard Benson; David Ivory	2:55
2.	"I Get Off"	Hale; Benson; Dana Calitri; Nina Ossoff; Kathy Sommer	3:04
3.	"Bet U Wish U Had Me Back"	Hale; Benson; Bobby Huff	3:43
4.	"Innocence"	Hale; Benson; Ben Moody	3:16
5.	"Familiar Taste of Poison"	Hale; David Bassett; Benson; Ivory	4:04
6.	"I'm Not an Angel"	Hale; Benson; Kara DioGuardi; Marti Frederiksen	3:15
7.	"What Were You Expecting?"	Hale; Benson; John Lowery; James Michael	3:34
8.	"Love/Hate Heartbreak"	Hale; Benson; Tommy Henriksen; Trevor Lukather	3:19
9.	"Better Sorry Than Safe"	Hale; Cody Hanson; Brian Howes	3:12
10.	"Dirty Work"	Hale; Gavin Brown; DioGuardi	3:17
11.	"Nothing to Do with Love"	Hale; Bassett; Benson	3:30
Total length:			37:03

Deluxe edition bonus tracks
No.	Title	Writer(s)	Length
12.	"Tell Me Where It Hurts"	Hale; Benson; Corey Taylor	3:48
13.	"Conversation Over"	Hale; Benson; Huff	3:05
14.	"Dirty Mind"	Hale; Brown; DioGuardi	3:18
Total length:			47:14

Japanese edition bonus tracks
No.	Title	Writer(s)	Length
12.	"I Get Off (Live in Philly 2010)"	Hale; Benson; Calitri; Ossoff; Sommer	3:49
13.	"Better Sorry Than Safe (Live in Philly 2010)"	Hale; Cody Hanson; Howes	3:42
Total length:			44:34

10th Anniversary Edition
No.	Title	Length
12.	"Hero (Reluctant Hero)" (2006 Basement Demo)	4:08
13.	"Not Afraid of Losin'" (2007 Basement Demo)	3:24
14.	"Ride or Die" (2006 Basement Demo)	2:38
15.	"Gypsy Grifter" (2006 Basement Demo)	3:53
16.	"Who Do You Love?" (2006 Basement Demo)	4:10
17.	"The Proposition" (2005 Basement Demo)	2:54
18.	"Tired of Trying" (2006 Basement Demo)	4:20
19.	"Annabelle" (2006 Basement Demo)	4:03
20.	"Everyone Dies (Heaven Isn't Where We Belong)" (2008 Space Bitch Demo)	3:39
21.	"Coming Back To Me" (2007 LA Demo)	4:06
22.	"Not for Today" (2007 LA Demo)	3:41
23.	"Still Breathing" (2008 B-side)	3:03
Total length:		81:02

== Personnel ==
Credits adapted from the liner notes of Halestorm.

=== Band members ===
- Lzzy Hale − vocals, guitar, keyboards
- Arejay Hale − drums, percussion, backing vocals
- Joe Hottinger − guitar, backing vocals
- Josh Smith − bass guitar, backing vocals

=== Additional musicians ===
- Phil X − guitar (track 3)
- Howard Benson − keyboards, Hammond organ
- Debbie Lurie − strings arrangement (tracks 5, 6)

=== Technical ===
- Marc Vangool – guitar technician
- Jon Nicholson – drum technician
- Paul Decardi – digital editing
- Mike Plotnikoff − recording
- Ashburn Miller − strings recording (tracks 5, 6)
- Hatsukazu Inagaki − additional engineering
- Howard Benson − production
- Chris Lord-Alge − mixing
- Howard Benson − programming
- Ted Jensen − mastering

=== Managerial and artwork ===
- Bill McGathy − management
- Vincent Hartong − management
- Scott Sokol − booking
- John Bongiorno − booking
- Nick Ferrara − legal representation
- Beth Sabbagh − business management
- Carla Karakesisoglu − business management
- Diana de la Cerda − business management
- Pete Ganbarg − artists and repertoire
- Leigh Lust − artists and repertoire
- Anne DeClemente − artists and repertoire administration
- Phil Mucci − photography
- Mark Stutzman − cover illustration
- Brian Ranney − packaging production

== Charts ==
Chart (2009)	Peak position
US Billboard 200	40
US Top Rock Albums (Billboard)	11
US Top Hard Rock Albums (Billboard)	4
Greek Albums (IFPI)	33

For "It's Not You" (single):

Chart (2010)	Peak position
US Hot Rock & Alternative Songs (Billboard)	24

== Certifications ==
Region	Certification	Certified units/sales
United States (RIAA)	Gold	500,000^{‡}
^{‡} Sales+streaming figures based on certification alone.
