= Into the Wild Life =

Studio album by Halestorm
- Released: April 10, 2015
- Genres: Hard rock; alternative rock; pop rock
- Length: 49:31
- Label: Atlantic
- Producer: Jay Joyce

Halestorm chronology
Reanimate 2.0: The Covers EP (2013)	Into the Wild Life (2015)	Reanimate 3.0: The Covers EP (2017)

Singles from Into the Wild Life
- 1. "Apocalyptic" Released: January 12, 2015; 2. "Mayhem" Released: February 17, 2015; 3. "Amen" Released: March 3, 2015; 4. "I Am the Fire" Released: March 31, 2015; 5. "Sick Individual" Released: April 7, 2015

Into the Wild Life is the third studio album by American rock band Halestorm. It was scheduled for release on April 3, 2015, via Atlantic Records but due to unforeseen circumstances, it was pushed back by a week worldwide. The album was released in Europe on April 10, 2015, in the UK on April 13, in North America on April 14, and in Japan on April 15. The album peaked at number five on the Billboard 200, making it their highest charting release to date in the US.

== Critical reception ==
Professional ratings
Aggregate scores
Source	Rating
Metacritic	67/100
Review scores
Source	Rating
411Mania	8.5/10 stars
AllMusic	3.5/5 stars
aNewRisingMusic	3.5/5 stars
AXS	8.8/10 stars
The Guardian	2/5 stars
lsureveille	4/5 stars
Melodic Rock	(90/100)
Rocksins	7/10 stars
Rolling Stone	3/5 stars
Stereoboard	3.5/5 stars

Into the Wild Life received generally favorable reviews from music critics. According to Metacritic, the album received an average score of 67/100 based on five reviews.

James Christopher Monger at AllMusic regarded "I Am the Fire", "Gonna Get Mine", "Dear Daughter", and "Mayhem" as some of Halestorm's best songs, adding, "the band is undeniably tight and flush with ideas, and Hale is such a force of nature that the occasional foray into AOR snooze-ville can be forgiven". Kory Grow from Rolling Stone gave Into the Wild Life a positive review of 3/5 stars, stating, "While Hale has packed Into the Wild Life with similarly themed tunes, like the anti-boredom anthem "Mayhem", what makes it interesting are the risks Halestorm took this time, especially the country influences seeping into the Tennessee studio where they recorded".

Dom Lawson, reporting for The Guardian, wrote a more negative review of the album, giving it 2 stars and saying: "Joyce's heavy-handed production has transformed a likable hard rock band into a slick, mainstream pop act, albeit one with a penchant for power chords and blazing guitar solos. Hale's voice is still impressive, but from Scream's incongruous electronic pulse to Amen's leaden Nickelback-isms, Into the Wild Life is as plastic and cynical as it gets".

Following Into the Wild Life's success, Halestorm was nominated for the Breakthrough Band of the Year award at the 2015 Metal Hammer Golden Gods Awards, alongside In This Moment, The Amity Affliction, and Bury Tomorrow, but ultimately lost out to Babymetal.

In 2024, Loudwire staff elected it as the best hard rock album of 2015.

== Track listing ==
All tracks are produced by Jay Joyce.

No.	Title	Writer(s)	Length
1.	"Scream"	Lzzy Hale; Joe Hottinger; Dave Bassett	4:01
2.	"I Am the Fire"	Hale; Hottinger; Scott Stevens	3:37
3.	"Sick Individual"	Hale; Hottinger; Stevens	3:27
4.	"Amen"	Hale; Hottinger; Stevens	2:58
5.	"Dear Daughter"	Hale; Hottinger; Bassett	4:46
6.	"New Modern Love"	Hale; Hottinger; Bassett	3:38
7.	"Mayhem"	Hale; Hottinger; Bassett	3:38
8.	"Bad Girl's World"	Hale; Hottinger; John Joseph Joyce	5:08
9.	"Gonna Get Mine"	Hale; Hottinger; Josh Smith	2:57
10.	"The Reckoning"	Hale; Stevens	3:44
11.	"Apocalyptic"	Hale; Nate Campany; Stevens	3:17
12.	"What Sober Couldn't Say"	Hale; Hottinger; Natalie Hemby; Stevens	3:33
13.	"I Like It Heavy"	Hale; Hottinger; Stevens; Zach Malloy	4:53
Total length:			49:31

Deluxe edition (bonus tracks)
No.	Title	Writer(s)	Length
14.	"Jump the Gun"	Hale; Hottinger; Stevens; Jaren Johnston	3:08
15.	"Unapologetic"	Hale; Hottinger; Joyce; Hillary Lindsey	4:09
Total length:			56:48

Japanese edition (bonus tracks)
No.	Title	Writer(s)	Length
16.	"Drunk Pretty"	Hale; Hottinger; Joyce; Hemby	3:02
Total length:			59:50

== Personnel ==
Credits adapted from the liner notes of Into the Wild Life.

- Dave Bassett – composer
- Nate Campany – composer
- Anne Declemente – A&R
- Anthony Delia – marketing
- Richard Dodd – mastering
- Pete Ganbarg – A&R
- Arejay Hale – composer, drums, group member, vocals
- Lzzy Hale – composer, group member, rhythm guitar, piano, lead vocals
- Halestorm – primary artist
- Jason Hall – engineer, mixing
- Natalie Hemby – composer
- Joe Hottinger – composer, group member, lead guitar, vocals
- Jay Joyce – composer, engineer, mixing, producer
- Alex Kirzhner – art direction, design
- Dylan Lancaster – assistant engineer
- Zachary Malloy – composer
- Jake Giles Netter – photography
- Daniel O'Neil – guitar technician
- Brian Ranney – package production
- Paul Simmons – drum technician
- Josh Smith – composer, group member, guitar (bass), piano, vocals
- Scott Christopher Stevens – composer
- Caleb VanBuskirk – assistant engineer

== Charts ==
Chart (2015)	Peak position
Australian Albums (ARIA)	51
Austrian Albums (Ö3 Austria)	33
Belgian Albums (Ultratop Flanders)	73
Belgian Albums (Ultratop Wallonia)	149
Canadian Albums (Billboard)	7
German Albums (Offizielle Top 100)	24
Irish Albums (IRMA)	24
Italian Albums (FIMI)	81
Japanese Albums (Oricon)	55
Dutch Albums (Album Top 100)	59
New Zealand Albums (RMNZ)	28
Swedish Albums (Sverigetopplistan)	50
Swiss Albums (Schweizer Hitparade)	20
UK Albums (OCC)	10
UK Rock and Metal Albums (OCC)	1
US Billboard 200	5
US Top Rock Albums (Billboard)	1
US Top Alternative Albums (Billboard)	1
US Top Hard Rock Albums (Billboard)	1
