= Lzzy Hale =

American rock musician (born 1983)

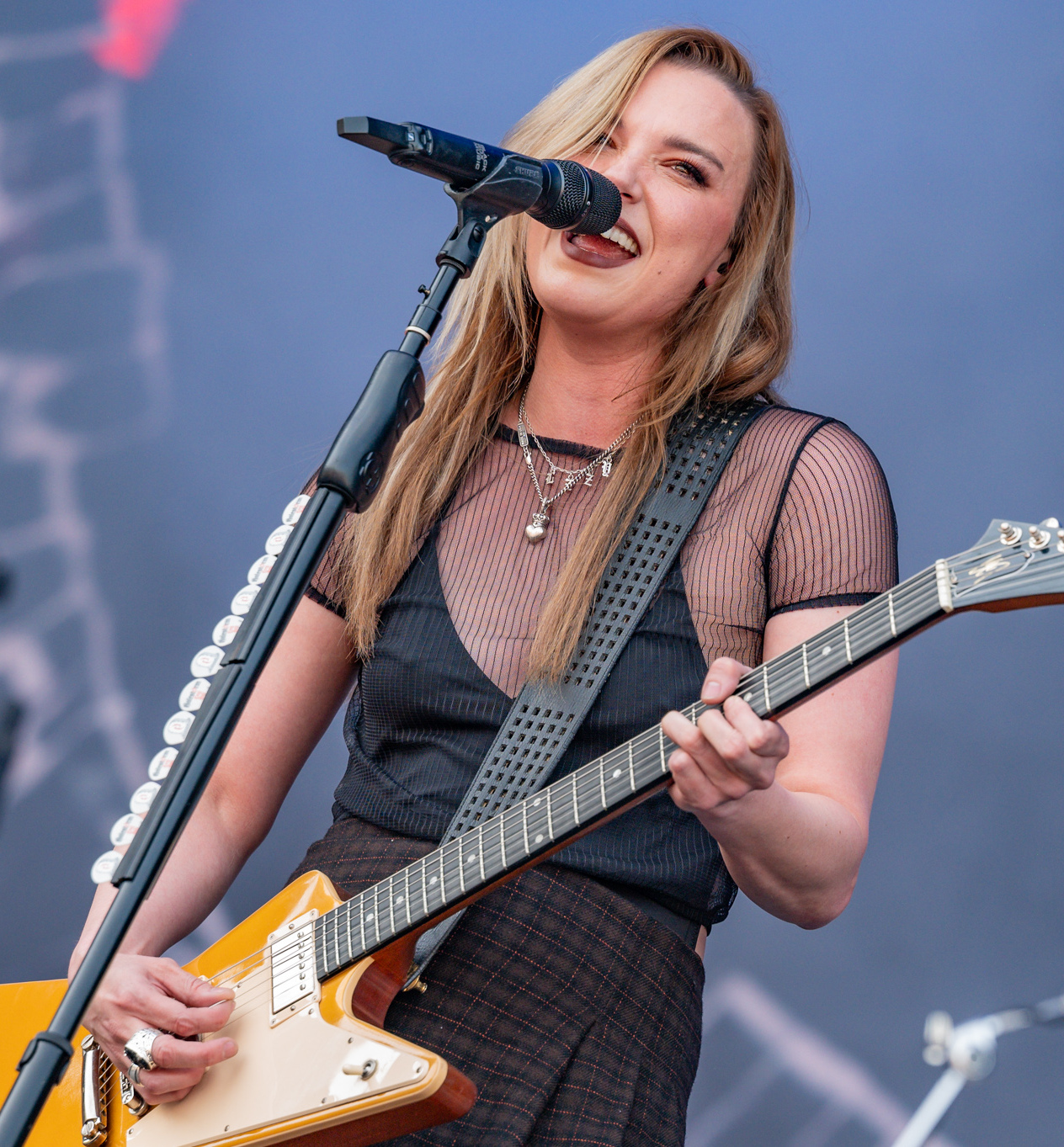
- Hale performing with Halestorm in 2023

Background information
- Born: Elizabeth Mae Hale IV; October 10, 1983 (age 42); Red Lion, Pennsylvania, U.S.
- Genres: Hard rock; heavy metal; alternative metal; post-grunge; alternative rock
- Occupations: Singer; musician; songwriter
- Instruments: Vocals; guitar; piano
- Years active: 1997–present
- Member of: Halestorm

Elizabeth Mae "Lzzy" Hale IV (born October 10, 1983) is an American musician. She serves as the lead singer and rhythm guitarist of hard rock band Halestorm, which she co-founded with her brother Arejay Hale in 1997.

== Early life ==
Hale was born October 10, 1983, in Red Lion, Pennsylvania, and grew up on a farm in Pennsylvania. She is the fourth Elizabeth Mae in her family. At age 17, she began using the name "Lzzy" following confusion caused by a fan calling her that on the band's website.

== Career ==
Hale began writing and performing music in 1997, when she founded Halestorm with her brother Arejay Hale. She has since gained success as Halestorm's lead singer, and she has performed live and recorded guest appearances alongside fellow rock/metal artists and musicians from other genres.

Hale refers to herself as an "Ambassador for Rock". She is recognized being a role model for young artists and girls, and speaking to the need for gender equality and acceptance of people of all sexual orientations both within the music industry and society.

=== Guest appearances ===
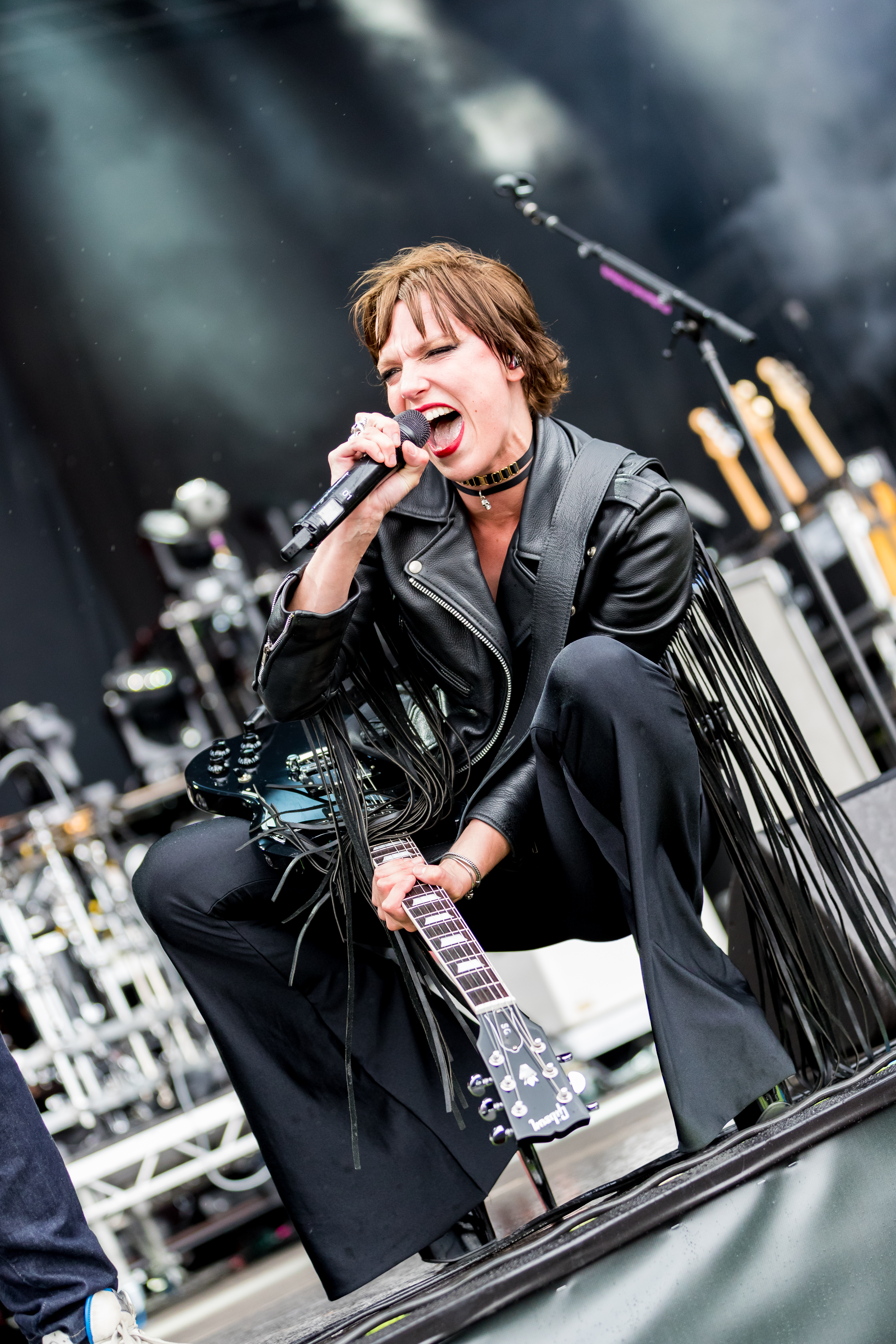
Hale performing at Rock am Ring and Rock im Park in Nuremberg, Germany, in June 2019

As a musical artist Hale has collaborated with a number of other notable bands and artists, including Dada Life, Dream Theater, New Years Day, Mark Morton, In This Moment, the Hu, Cory Marks, Evanescence, Apocalyptica, Dee Snider, Slothrust, Avatar, Lindsey Stirling, Daughtry, Trans-Siberian Orchestra, Nita Strauss, Gwar, The Native Howl, and Rascal Flatts.

In March 2024, it was announced that Hale would fill in as the lead vocalist for Skid Row for their 2024 summer concerts. Hale called the short-term gig a "full-circle moment," telling Loudwire that Skid Row "bridged the gap" between her love of '80s metal and '90s and 2000s nu-metal and alt-metal. Hale performed four shows with Skid Row in the United States but couldn't join the band full-time due to personal commitments.

Hale has also performed solo for various live events. On April 7, 2018, Hale, backed by Cane Hill, played wrestler Ember Moon to the ring for her NXT Women's title defense against Shayna Baszler, performing her entrance theme "Free the Flame" at NXT TakeOver: New Orleans. On February 29, 2020, Hale performed at Nashville SC's inaugural Major League Soccer match at Nissan Stadium.

=== Gibson promotion ===
In 2021, Gibson announced that Hale was being named the first female Gibson brand ambassador. A long-time fan and user, Hale had previously partnered with Gibson to design the Limited Edition Lzzy Hale Explorer guitar, and she designed other signature models for Gibson, Epiphone, and Kramer.

In August 2022, Hale gifted a special Gibson Explorer to Dany Villarreal (from The Warning) as 'reward' for the inspiring new generation of rock.

=== Revolver appearances ===
In the December 2009 issue of Revolver magazine, Hale appeared on the cover alongside former Landmine Marathon vocalist Grace Perry as one of the "Hottest Chicks in Metal". For most years since, Hale has been listed as one of the magazine's "Hottest" either in the magazine and/or in its Hottest Chicks calendar. For the magazine's February/March 2015 issue, Hale appeared alone on the cover for both a feature article and once more as one of Revolver's "25 hottest chicks in hard rock and metal".

Hale has also written the advice column "Ask Lzzy" for Revolver.

=== Other activities ===
In 2020, Hale was made the host of the third season of "A Year in Music" on AXS TV, which she continued to host in season four. She was also a judge on the inaugural season of the television show "No Cover", a music competition show where unsigned bands and artists performed original songs with the hope of winning a record contract. In 2025, she voiced Raze, a character in a new virtual reality game, "Raze Vol. 1."

== Personal life ==
Hale confirmed she is bisexual on her personal Twitter account in 2015. She is in a long-term relationship with Joe Hottinger, her fellow guitarist in Halestorm, and they live in Nashville, Tennessee.

Hale often speaks out about the importance of supporting one's mental health. She has stated she experiences anxiety, depression, and impostor syndrome, and she quit drinking in December 2023.

In 2018, she started the #RaiseYourHorns trend online following the suicide of Huntress vocalist Jill Janus, resulting in thousands of pictures being posted online from celebrities and rock fans sharing their own experiences with mental illness. Many songs on the band's fifth album, Back from the Dead, were rooted in Lzzy's mental health journey during the COVID-19 pandemic.

== Awards and nominations ==
Year	Award	Nominee/work	Category	Result	Ref
2013	55th Annual Grammy Awards	"Love Bites (So Do I)"	Best Hard Rock/Metal Performance	Won	
2016	"Metal Hammer Golden Gods Awards"	Lzzy Hale	'Dimebag Darrell Shredder' Award	Won	
2019	Loudwire	Halestorm	Rock Artist of the Decade	Won	
2019	61st Annual Grammy Awards	"Uncomfortable"	Best Rock Performance	Nominated	
2020	She Rocks Awards	Lzzy Hale	Inspire Award	Won	
2023	Heavy Music Awards	Halestorm	Best International Artist	Won	
2023	Heavy Music Awards	Halestorm	Best International Live Artist	Nominated	
2023	Heavy Music Awards	Back from the Dead	Best Album	Nominated	
2023	Heavy Music Awards	Back from the Dead	Best Production	Nominated	

== Discography ==
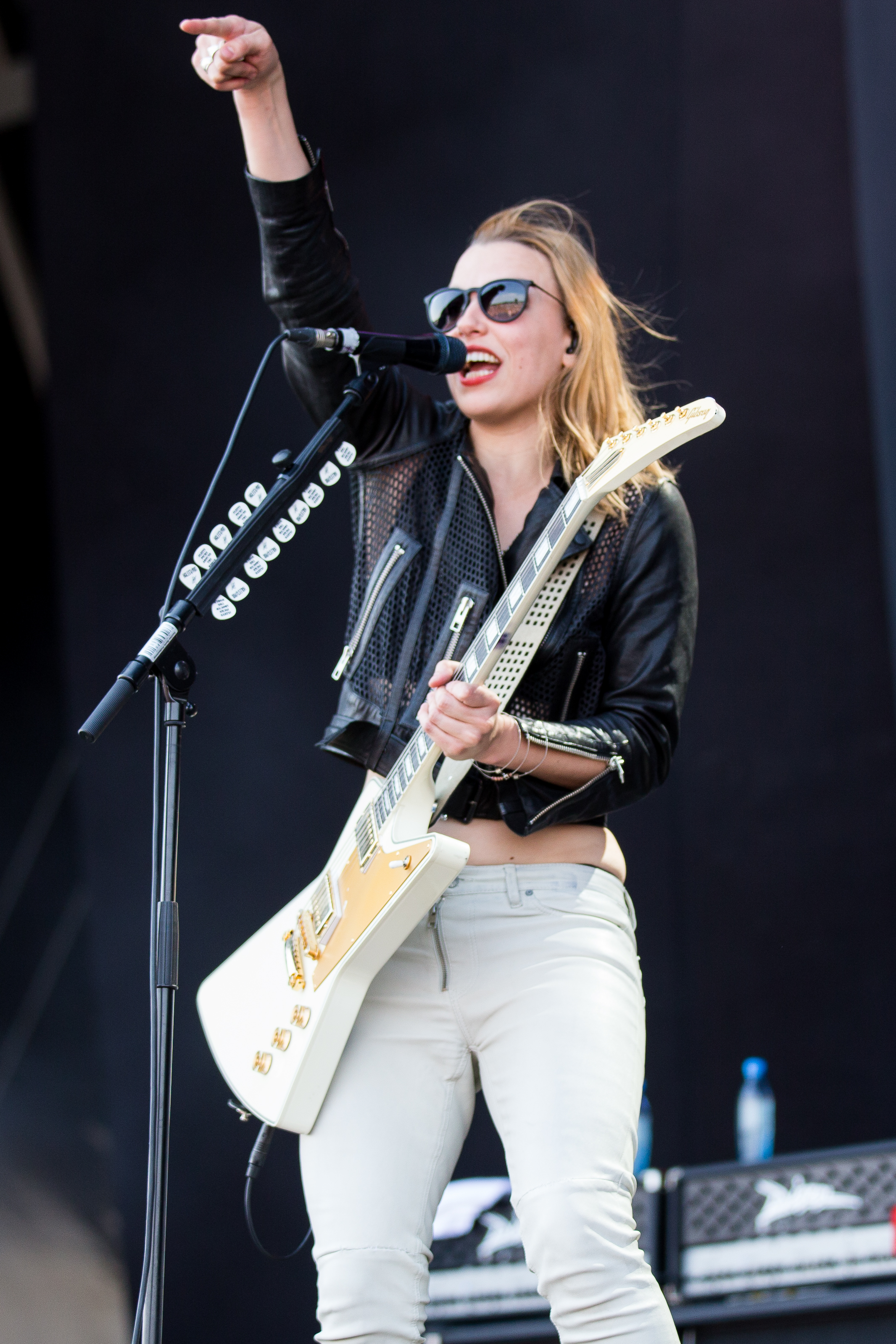
Hale performing in Hockenheim, Germany, in August 2015

Halestorm

- Halestorm (2009)
- The Strange Case Of... (2012)
- Into the Wild Life (2015)
- Vicious (2018)
- Back from the Dead (2022)
- Everest (2025)

=== As featured artist ===
Title	Year	Peak chart positions				Album
Title	Year	US	US Main	CAN	UK	Album
"Separate Ways (Worlds Apart)" (with Daughtry)	2023	— (Note: "Separate Ways (Worlds Apart)" did not enter the US Billboard Hot 100, but peaked at number 3 on the US Digital Song Sales chart.)	5	(Note: "Separate Ways (Worlds Apart)" did not enter the Billboard Canadian Hot 100, but peaked at number 21 on the Canadian Digital Song Sales chart.)	— (Note: "Separate Ways (Worlds Apart)" did not enter the UK Singles Chart, but peaked at number 49 on the UK Singles Sales Chart.)	Non-album single
"—" denotes a release that did not chart or a value that is not applicable.
