= List of Billboard Mainstream Rock number-one songs of the 2010s =

The Billboard Mainstream Rock chart is compiled from the number of airplay songs received from active rock and heritage rock radio stations in the United States. Below are the songs that have reached number one on the chart during the 2010s, listed in chronological order beginning with the first new number one of the decade, "Your Decision" by Alice in Chains. "Break" by Three Days Grace began an 11-week run at number one on December 11, 2009, and was ranked the number-one song on the Mainstream Rock chart for the year 2010 by Billboard.

== 2010s ==
† – Number-one mainstream rock song of the year

Issue date	Song	Artist(s)	Weeks at number one (Note: Weeks spent at number one in this decade)
2010
January 2	"Break"†	Three Days Grace	8
February 27	"Your Decision"	Alice in Chains	8
April 24	"Cryin' Like a Bitch"	Godsmack	5
May 29	"The Good Life"	Three Days Grace	5
July 3	"Let Me Hear You Scream"	Ozzy Osbourne	4
July 31	"The Crow & the Butterfly"	Shinedown	1
August 7	"Another Way to Die"	Disturbed	8
October 2	"Say You'll Haunt Me"	Stone Sour	8
November 27	"Porn Star Dancing"	My Darkest Days featuring Zakk Wylde and Chad Kroeger	2
December 11	"World So Cold"	Three Days Grace	5
2011
January 15	"The Sex Is Good"	Saving Abel	1
January 22	"Isolation"	Alter Bridge	7
March 12	"Diamond Eyes (Boom-Lay Boom-Lay Boom)"	Shinedown	3
April 2	"Rope"	Foo Fighters	5
May 7	"Country Song"†	Seether	10
July 16	"Lies of the Beautiful People"	Sixx:A.M.	2
July 30	"So Far Away"	Avenged Sevenfold	3
August 20	"Lowlife"	Theory of a Deadman	3
September 10	"Walk"	Foo Fighters	4
October 8	"Not Again"	Staind	4
November 5	"Tonight"	Seether	1
November 12	"Not Again"	Staind	3
December 3	"Face to the Floor"	Chevelle	12
2012
February 25	"Bully"†	Shinedown	12
May 19	"Live to Rise"	Soundgarden	6
June 30	"Burn It Down"	Linkin Park	1
July 7	"You're a Lie"	Slash featuring Myles Kennedy & The Conspirators	2
July 21	"Still Counting"	Volbeat	2
August 4	"Unity"	Shinedown	4
September 1	"Coming Down"	Five Finger Death Punch	1
September 8	"Criticize"	Adelitas Way	1
September 15	"Coming Down"	Five Finger Death Punch	1
September 22	"Chalk Outline"	Three Days Grace	13
December 22	"Been Away Too Long"	Soundgarden	7
2013
February 9	"Heaven nor Hell"	Volbeat	1
February 16	"Stand Up"	All That Remains	2
March 2	"Hollow"	Alice in Chains	3
March 23	"Bones"	Young Guns	1
March 30	"Hollow"	Alice in Chains	2
April 13	"Freak Like Me"	Halestorm	2
April 27	"The High Road"	Three Days Grace	1
May 4	"By Crooked Steps"	Soundgarden	2
May 18	"Vilify"	Device	2
June 1	"The Hangman's Body Count"	Volbeat	3
June 22	"Stone"	Alice in Chains	3
July 13	"Trenches"†	Pop Evil	4
August 10	"Lift Me Up"	Five Finger Death Punch	1
August 17	"Out of Time"	Stone Temple Pilots with Chester Bennington	1
August 24	"Hail to the King"	Avenged Sevenfold	10
November 2	"Misery Loves My Company"	Three Days Grace	1
November 9	"Hail to the King"	Avenged Sevenfold	1
November 16	"Never Never"	Korn	3
December 7	"Lola Montez"	Volbeat	1
December 14	"Battle Born"	Five Finger Death Punch	2
December 28	"Deal with the Devil"	Pop Evil	1
2014
January 4	"Battle Born"	Five Finger Death Punch	3
January 25	"Tired"	Stone Sour	1
February 1	"Shepherd of Fire"	Avenged Sevenfold	7
March 22	"Heaven Knows"†	The Pretty Reckless	5
April 26	"Take Out the Gunman"	Chevelle	3
May 17	"Guilty All the Same"	Linkin Park featuring Rakim	3
June 7	"Torn to Pieces"	Pop Evil	2
June 21	"Painkiller"	Three Days Grace	4
July 19	"Words as Weapons"	Seether	5
August 23	"1000hp"	Godsmack	3
September 13	"Messed Up World (F'd Up World)"	The Pretty Reckless	1
September 20	"Until It's Gone"	Linkin Park	1
September 27	"Messed Up World (F'd Up World)"	The Pretty Reckless	3
October 18	"World on Fire"	Slash featuring Myles Kennedy & The Conspirators	1
October 25	"Edge of a Revolution"	Nickelback	2
November 8	"Something from Nothing"	Foo Fighters	13
2015
February 7	"I Am Machine"	Three Days Grace	6
March 21	"Face Everything and Rise"	Papa Roach	1
March 28	"Apocalyptic"	Halestorm	1
April 4	"Congregation"	Foo Fighters	3
April 25	"Coming for You"	The Offspring	1
May 2	"Follow Me Down"	The Pretty Reckless	1
May 9	"Heavy Is the Head (song)"	Zac Brown Band featuring Chris Cornell	2
May 23	"Failure"†	Breaking Benjamin	9
July 25	"Little Monster"	Royal Blood	1
August 1	"Amen"	Halestorm	1
August 8	"Cut the Cord"	Shinedown	3
August 29	"The Vengeful One"	Disturbed	1
September 5	"Cut the Cord"	Shinedown	4
October 3	"Footsteps"	Pop Evil	4
October 31	"The Otherside"	Red Sun Rising	1
November 7	"Angels Fall"	Breaking Benjamin	4
December 5	"Throne"	Bring Me the Horizon	2
December 19	"The Light"	Disturbed	5
2016
January 23	"Wash It All Away"	Five Finger Death Punch	2
February 6	"State of My Head"	Shinedown	6
March 19	"The Sound of Silence"	Disturbed	7
May 7	"Emotionless"	Red Sun Rising	2
May 21	"The Devil's Bleeding Crown"†	Volbeat	9
July 23	"Dark Necessities"	Red Hot Chili Peppers	3
August 13	"Joyride (Omen)"	Chevelle	4
September 10	"Bang Bang"	Green Day	4
October 8	"Hardwired"	Metallica	1
October 15	"Bang Bang"	Green Day	3
November 5	"Take Me Down"	The Pretty Reckless	2
November 19	"Feel Invincible"	Skillet	1
November 26	"Open Your Eyes"	Disturbed	1
December 3	"My Name Is Human"	Highly Suspect	8
2017
January 28	"Square Hammer"	Ghost	2
February 11	"Still Breathing"	Green Day	1
February 18	"Atlas, Rise!"	Metallica	2
March 4	"How Did You Love"	Shinedown	4
April 1	"Never Again"	Breaking Benjamin	2
April 15	"Help"	Papa Roach	6
May 27	"Let You Down"	Seether	4
June 24	"Black Rose"	Volbeat featuring Danko Jones	1
July 1	"Song #3"†	Stone Sour	4
July 29	"Run"	Foo Fighters	4
August 26	"Lights Out"	Royal Blood	3
September 16	"Highway Tune"	Greta Van Fleet	5
October 21	"Rx (Medicate)"	Theory of a Deadman	6
December 2	"Go to War"	Nothing More	1
December 9	"The Sky Is a Neighborhood"	Foo Fighters	4
2018
January 3	"I Only Lie When I Love You"	Royal Blood	6
February 10	"Born for Greatness"	Papa Roach	2
February 24	"Safari Song"	Greta Van Fleet	1
March 3	"Born for Greatness"	Papa Roach	1
March 10	"Safari Song"	Greta Van Fleet	2
March 24	"Waking Lions"	Pop Evil	1
March 31	"The Mountain"	Three Days Grace	5
May 5	"Zombie"	Bad Wolves	3
May 26	"Bulletproof"†	Godsmack	1
June 2	"Devil"	Shinedown	1
June 9	"Bulletproof"	Godsmack	4
July 7	"Rats"	Ghost	7
August 25	"Uncomfortable"	Halestorm	2
September 8	"Sham Pain"	Five Finger Death Punch	1
September 15	"Infra-Red"	Three Days Grace	1
September 22	"Torn in Two"	Breaking Benjamin	1
September 29	"Are You Ready"	Disturbed	6
November 10	"When the Curtain Falls"	Greta Van Fleet	1
November 17	"Are You Ready"	Disturbed	2
December 1	"Get Up"	Shinedown	2
December 15	"When Legends Rise"	Godsmack	5
2019
January 19	"S.O.S. (Sawed Off Shotgun)"	The Glorious Sons	4
February 16	"Dance Macabre"	Ghost	2
March 2	"When the Seasons Change"	Five Finger Death Punch	1
March 9	"Do Your Worst"	Rival Sons	1
March 16	"You're the One"	Greta Van Fleet	2
March 30	"A Reason to Fight"	Disturbed	3
April 20	"Right Left Wrong"	Three Days Grace	3
May 11	"Lo/Hi"	The Black Keys	2
May 25	"Heroin"	Badflower	1
June 1	"Blue on Black"	Five Finger Death Punch featuring Kenny Wayne Shepherd, Brantley Gilbert and Brian May	4
June 29	"Monsters"	Shinedown	1
July 6	"Blue on Black"	Five Finger Death Punch featuring Kenny Wayne Shepherd, Brantley Gilbert and Brian May	1
July 13	"Remember When"†	Bad Wolves	2
July 27	"Under Your Scars"	Godsmack	2
August 10	"Last Day Under the Sun"	Volbeat	4
September 7	"No More"	Disturbed	4
October 5	"When I'm Gone"	Dirty Honey	1
October 12	"Panic Attack"	The Glorious Sons	2
October 26	"16"	Highly Suspect	2
November 9	"Father of All..."	Green Day	1
November 16	"16"	Highly Suspect	2
November 30	"The Jester"	Badflower	1
December 7	"Come Around"	Papa Roach	1
December 14	"Under the Graveyard"	Ozzy Osbourne	3
