= The Pretty Reckless discography =

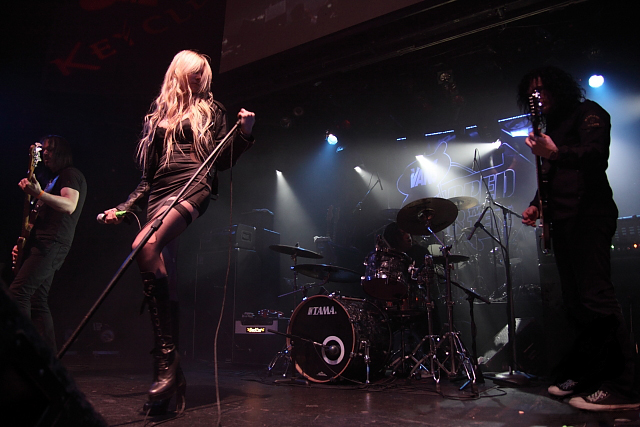
- The Pretty Reckless performing at the Warped Tour Kickoff in April 2010
- Studio albums: 5
- Extended plays: 4
- Compilation albums: 1
- Singles: 17
- Music videos: 21
- Promotional singles: 7

American rock band the Pretty Reckless has released five studio albums, one compilation, three extended plays, seventeen singles, seven promotional singles, and twenty-one music videos. Originally named the Reckless, the band was formed in early 2009, with Taylor Momsen on vocals, Ben Phillips on lead guitar, Mark Damon on bass and Jamie Perkins on drums.

During 2009, they played some small concerts in New York City and then opened for the Veronicas on their North American tour. Following the end of that tour, Interscope Records signed a record deal with the band. Their debut single, "Make Me Wanna Die", reached the Top 20 of the UK Singles Chart. The song was eventually featured on their debut studio album, Light Me Up, released in August 2010. The album had sold over one million units in combined singles and albums sales as of January 2014. In March 2012, the band released their second extended play, Hit Me Like a Man EP, which included three original tracks.

In 2013, the Pretty Reckless signed with label Razor & Tie to release their second studio album, Going to Hell, in March 2014. The album peaked at number 5 on the Billboard 200, spawned five singles, of which three topped Billboard's Mainstream Rock chart—"Heaven Knows", "Messed Up World (F'd Up World)", and "Follow Me Down". In October 2016, the band released a follow-up album, Who You Selling For, which peaked at number 13 on the Billboard 200. Its lead single, "Take Me Down", topped the US Mainstream Rock chart, making the Pretty Reckless the first act to send its first four entries to number 1 on that chart, as well as the female-fronted group with the most number 1 singles.

Their fourth album Death by Rock and Roll was released in February 2021, through Fearless Records, and its title track and lead single became their fifth US Mainstream Rock number 1. The song also gave the band their first number 1 on Billboard's Canada Rock chart. The follow-up singles, "And So It Went" and "Only Love Can Save Me Now", extended their record for the most number ones for any woman-led act in Billboard's Mainstream Rock chart's history and marked the second time the band topped the chart with three different tracks from the same album. By May 2023, the band had sold over 1,090,000 albums in their home country.

== Albums ==
=== Studio albums ===
List of studio albums, with selected chart positions, sales figures and certifications
Title	Details	Peak chart positions										Sales	Certifications
Title	Details	US	AUS	BEL (FL)	CAN	FRA	GER	IRE	JPN	NZ	UK	Sales	Certifications
Light Me Up	Released: August 27, 2010; Label: Interscope; Formats: CD, digital download	65	71	— (Note: Light Me Up did not enter the Flemish Ultratop Albums chart, but peaked at number 2 on the Flemish Ultratop Heatseekers Albums chart.)	57	167	—	18	48	—	6	US: 132,000	BPI: Gold
Going to Hell	Released: March 12, 2014; Label: Razor & Tie; Formats: CD, LP, digital download	5	20	57	5	46	35	45	50	19	8	US: 225,000	BPI: Silver; MC: Gold
Who You Selling For	Released: October 21, 2016; Label: Razor & Tie; Formats: CD, LP, digital download	13	33	192	12	90	38	—	162	24	23	UK: 4,157	
Death by Rock and Roll	Released: February 12, 2021; Label: Fearless; Formats: CD, LP, digital download	28	15	38	28	109	5	—	107	—	6	US: 66,000	
Dear God	Released: June 26, 2026; Label: Fearless; Formats: CD, LP, digital download	79	7	57	—	—	7	—	—	—	6		

=== Compilation albums ===
List of compilation albums, with selected chart positions
Title	Album details	Peak chart positions			
Title	Album details	US Sales	GER	SCO	UK Sales
Other Worlds	Released: November 4, 2022; Label: Fearless; Formats: CD, LP, digital download	34	36	37	29

== Extended plays ==
List of extended plays, with selected chart positions
Title	Details	Peaks				
Title	Details	US Rock	US Sales	US Hol.	SCO	UK Sales
The Pretty Reckless	Released: June 22, 2010; Label: Interscope; Formats: CD, digital download	—	—	—	—	—
Hit Me Like a Man EP	Released: March 2, 2012; Label: Interscope; Formats: CD, digital download	44	—	—	—	—
Taylor Momsen's Pretty Reckless Christmas	Released: October 31, 2025; Label: Fearless; Formats: CD, LP, digital download	—	20	19	38	38
Sessions	Released: September 15, 2026; Label: Fearless; Formats: digital download	—	—	—	—	—
"—" denotes a recording that did not chart or was not released in that territory.

== Singles ==
List of singles, with selected chart positions, showing year released and album name
Title	Year	Peak chart positions										Certifications	Album
Title	Year	US	US Main. Rock	US Rock	AUS	CAN	CAN Rock	FRA	NZ	UK	UK Rock	Certifications	Album
"Make Me Wanna Die"	2010	— (Note: "Make Me Wanna Die" did not enter the Billboard Hot 100, but peaked at number 4 on the Hot Singles Sales chart.)	—	— (Note: "Make Me Wanna Die" did not enter the Hot Rock Songs chart, but peaked at number 18 on the Rock Digital Songs chart.)	61	—	—	—	—	16	1	BPI: Silver; RMNZ: Gold	Light Me Up
"Miss Nothing"	2010	—	—	—	—	—	—	—	—	39	—		Light Me Up
"Just Tonight"	2010	—	—	— (Note: "Just Tonight" did not enter the Hot Rock Songs chart, but peaked at number 25 on the Rock Digital Songs chart.)	—	—	—	—	—	163	9		Light Me Up
"Kill Me"	2012	—	—	—	—	—	—	—	—	—	22		Non-album single
"Going to Hell"	2013	—	—	—	—	—	—	—	—	—	5		Going to Hell
"Heaven Knows"	2013	— (Note: "Heaven Knows" did not enter the Billboard Hot 100, but peaked at number 14 on the Bubbling Under Hot 100 Singles chart.)	1	17	—	48	2	158	38	61	1	RIAA: Platinum; MC: Platinum; RMNZ: Gold	Going to Hell
"Messed Up World"	2014	—	1	44	—	—	41	—	—	—	—		Going to Hell
"Follow Me Down"	2014	—	1	36	—	—	8	—	—	—	—		Going to Hell
"Take Me Down"	2016	—	1	27	—	—	5	—	—	—	—		Who You Selling For
"Oh My God"	2016	—	2	—	—	—	31	—	—	—	—		Who You Selling For
"Back to the River" (featuring Warren Haynes)	2017	—	12	—	—	—	—	—	—	—	—		Who You Selling For
"Death by Rock and Roll"	2020	—	1	19	—	—	1	—	—	—	—		Death by Rock and Roll
"And So It Went" (featuring Tom Morello)	2021	—	1	46	—	—	5	—	—	—	—		Death by Rock and Roll
"Only Love Can Save Me Now" (featuring Kim Thayil and Matt Cameron)	2021	—	1	— (Note: "Only Love Can Save Me Now" did not enter the Hot Rock Songs chart, but peaked at number 8 on the Hot Hard Rock Songs chart.)	—	—	21	—	—	—	—		Death by Rock and Roll
"For I Am Death"	2025	—	1	— (Note: "For I Am Death" did not enter the Hot Rock Songs chart, but peaked at number 18 on the Hot Hard Rock Songs chart.)	—	—	4	—	—	— (Note: "For I Am Death" did not enter the UK Singles Chart, but peaked at number 78 on the UK Singles Sales Chart.)	—		Dear God
"When I Wake Up"	2026	—	1	— (Note: "When I Wake Up" did not enter the Hot Rock Songs chart, but peaked at number 12 on the Hot Hard Rock Songs chart.)	—	—	4	—	—	—	—		Dear God
"—" denotes a recording that did not chart or was not released in that territory.

=== Promotional singles ===
List of promotional singles, showing year released and album name
Title	Year	Peak chart positions				Album
Title	Year	US Rock	CAN	IRE	NZ Hot	Album
"House on a Hill"	2014	—	—	—	—	Going to Hell
"Prisoner"	2016	—	—	—	—	Who You Selling For
"Broomsticks"	2020	—	—	—	—	Death by Rock and Roll
"25"	2020	—	—	—	—	Death by Rock and Roll
"Where Are You Christmas?"	2025	11	75	91	5	Taylor Momsen's Pretty Reckless Christmas
"Love Me"	2026	—	—	—	—	Dear God
"Dear God"	2026	—	—	—	—	Dear God
"About You" (Bonus Version)	2026	—	—	—	—	Non-album single
"—" denotes a recording that did not chart or was not released in that territory.

== Guest appearances ==
List of non-single guest appearances, with other performing artists, showing year released and album name
Title	Year	Album
"Just Tonight"	2011	Radio 1's Live Lounge – Volume 6
"Only You"	2012	Frankenweenie Unleashed! (Target limited edition)
"All Right Now" (with Bad Company)	2025	Can't Get Enough: A Tribute to Bad Company

== Music videos ==
List of music videos, showing year released and directors
Title	Year	Director(s)
"Make Me Wanna Die" (Viral Version)	2010	Patrick Dwyer
"Miss Nothing"	2010	Meiert Avis
"Make Me Wanna Die"	2010	Meiert Avis and Chris LeDoux
"Just Tonight"	2010	Meiert Avis
"You"	2012	Meiert Avis
"My Medicine"	2012	Meiert Avis, Taylor Momsen and Stefan Smith
"Going to Hell"	2013	Tim Mattia
"Heaven Knows"	2014	Jon J and Taylor Momsen
"Messed Up World (F'd Up World)"	2014	Jon J and Taylor Momsen
"House on a Hill"	2014	Unknown
"Take Me Down"	2016	Meiert Avis
"Oh My God"	2017	Meiert Avis
"25"	2020	Jon J and Taylor Momsen
"And So It Went"	2021	Jon J and Taylor Momsen
"Only Love Can Save Me Now"	2021	Jon J and Taylor Momsen
"Got So High"	2022	Jon J and Taylor Momsen
"For I Am Death" / "Life Evermore Pt. 2"	2025	Lewis Cater
"Where Are You Christmas?"	2025	Ethan Lader
"When I Wake Up"	2026	Taylor Momsen and Chris Acosta
"Dear God"	2026	George Gallardo Kattah
"About You" (Bonus Version)	2026	Taylor Momsen and Samuel Halleen
