= 2014 in rock music =

This article summarizes the events related to rock music for the year of 2014.

== Notable events ==
=== January ===
- Stone Sour's single "Tired" tops the Billboard Mainstream Rock chart for one week.
- Five Finger Death Punch's "Battle Born" returns to the top the Billboard Mainstream Rock chart for three weeks, after previously being at the top for two weeks in December 2013.
- You Me at Six release their fourth studio album, Cavalier Youth. It became their first album to top the UK albums chart, and was certified gold.

=== February ===
- Avenged Sevenfold's single "Shepherd of Fire" tops the Billboard Mainstream Rock chart and stays there for seven consecutive weeks.

=== March ===
- The Pretty Reckless's single "Heaven Knows" tops the Billboard Mainstream Rock chart and stays there for five consecutive weeks.
- The Pretty Reckless release their second studio album, Going to Hell. It debuts at number 5 on the Billboard 200 chart, selling 35,000 copies.
- Taking Back Sunday releases their sixth studio album, Happiness Is. It debuts at number 10 on the Billboard 200 chart, selling 22,000 copies.

=== April ===
- Chevelle's single "Take Out the Gunman" tops the Billboard Mainstream Rock chart for three weeks.
- Chevelle releases their sixth studio album, La Gargola. It debuts at number 3 on the Billboard 200 chart, selling 45,000 copies.
- Memphis May Fire releases their fourth studio album, Unconditional. It debuts at number 4 on the US Billboard 200, selling 27,000 units.

=== May ===
- Linkin Park's single "Guilty All the Same" tops the Billboard Mainstream Rock chart for three weeks.
- Coldplay's sixth studio album Ghost Stories tops the Billboard 200 chart for two weeks straight, selling 383,000 and 83,000 copies in its first and second weeks. The debut week's sales are the highest of the year upon its release, and remains as one of the highest throughout 2014.
- The Black Keys releases their eighth studio album, Turn Blue. It tops the Billboard 200 chart, selling 164,000 copies in its debut week.

=== June ===
- Three Days Grace's single "Painkiller" tops the Billboard Mainstream Rock chart for four weeks.
- Pop Evil's single "Torn to Pieces" tops the Billboard Mainstream Rock chart for two weeks.
- Jack White releases his second solo studio album, Lazaretto. It tops the Billboard 200 chart, selling 138,000. It is his second of two studio albums to top the chart at the time, and also breaks the record for most sales in the vinyl format; with 41,000 of the sales coming from it, more than any release prior to 1991, when Nielsen Soundscan start tracking the format.
- Linkin Park releases their sixth studio album The Hunting Party. It debuts at number 3 on the Billboard 200 chart, selling 110,000 copies.
- Mastodon releases their sixth studio album, Once More Round the Sun. It debuts at number 6 on the Billboard 200 chart, selling 34,000 copies.
- Led Zeppelin I, Led Zeppelin II and Led Zeppelin III all re-enter the top 10 of the Billboard 200 for a week upon deluxe editions being released.

=== July ===
- Seether's single "Words as Weapons" tops the Billboard Mainstream Rock chart for five weeks straight. It is their fifth song to top the chart at the time.
- Seether releases their sixth studio album, Isolate and Medicate. It debuts as number four on the Billboard 200 chart, selling 37,000 copies.
- Tom Petty and the Heartbreakers release their thirteenth and final album, Hypnotic Eye. It tops the Billboard 200 chart, selling 131,000 copies. It is their first album to top the US charts, after 37 years of being a band and releasing music. The album later earns a Grammy Nomination, and ends up being the group's final album following Tom Petty's death in 2017.
- Eric Clapton's releases his twelfth studio album The Breeze: An Appreciation of JJ Cale. It debuts at number two on the Billboard 200 chart, just behind Hypnotic Eye. Petty also contributes to this release.
- Theory of a Deadman releases their fifth studio album Savages. It debuts at number 8 - a career high - on the Billboard 200 chart, selling 28,000 copies.
- Crown the Empire releases their second studio album The Resistance: Rise of The Runaways. The album debuts at number 7 on the Billboard 200, selling 27,000 copies.
- Rise Against releases their seventh studio album The Black Market. It debuts at number 4 on the Billboard 200, selling 53,000 copies.

=== August ===
- Godsmack's single "1000hp" tops the Billboard Mainstream Rock chart for three weeks.
- Godsmack releases their sixth studio album, also titled 1000hp. It debuts at number three on the Billboard 200 chart, selling 58,000 copies.
- Spoon releases their eighth studio album, They Want My Soul. It debuts at number four on the Billboard 200 chart, selling 39,000 copies.
- Counting Crows release their first album in six years, their seventh studio album Somewhere Under Wonderland. It debuts at number 6 on the Billboard 200 chart, selling 32,000 copies.
- The Gaslight Anthem releases their fifth and final studio album, Get Hurt. It debuts at number 4 on the Billboard 200 chart, selling 32,000 copies.

=== September ===
- The Pretty Reckless's single "Messed Up World" tops the Billboard Mainstream Rock chart for a week, drops down for a week, and then returns to the top again for another three weeks in a row. It is the band's second song to top the chart at the time, and starts of a competition spanning later years between themselves and Halestorm for most number ones on the chart for a female-fronted band, Taylor Momsen fronting The Pretty Reckless, and Lzzy Hale fronting Halestorm.
- Linkin Park's single "Until It's Gone" tops the Billboard Mainstream Rock chart for one week. It is their eighth and final song to top the chart.
- Motionless in White releases their third studio album Reincarnate. It debuts at number 9 on the Billboard 200 chart, selling 31,000 copies.
- *Slash (of Guns N' Roses) collaboration with Myles Kennedy (of Alterbridge) collaborate on the album World on Fire. The album debuts at number 10 on the Billboard 200 chart, selling 29,000 copies.
- U2 releases their thirteenth studio album, Songs of Innocence. The band opts for a new, non-traditional release method with mixed results; teaming with Apple to deliver the album directly to any customer with an active i-Tunes account. The release proves to be divisive; on one hand, it leads to over 26 million downloads and an estimated 81 million people listening to the album within the first month; however, it also leads to concerns on the devaluation of the monetary value of music as a commercial product, and angers some iTunes customers due to its automatic download without the user's consent. A traditional commercial release occurs the following month, with the album debuting at number 9 on the Billboard 200 chart, selling just 28,000 copies, drastically lower than their prior release, No Line on the Horizon, which sold just under half a million copies in its first week of availability.

=== October ===
- Nickelback's single "Edge of a Revolution" tops the Billboard Mainstream Rock chart for two weeks. The song was written to bring awareness to the Shooting of Michael Brown in Ferguson, Missouri.
- Slash (of Guns N' Roses) collaboration with Myles Kennedy (of Alterbridge) single "World on Fire" tops the Billboard Mainstream Rock chart for a week.
- Slipknot releases their fifth studio album .5: The Gray Chapter. It tops the Billboard 200 chart, selling 132,000 copies.
- Weezer releases their ninth studio album, Everything Will Be Alright in the End. It debuts at number 5 on the Billboard 200 chart, selling 34,000 copies.
- Black Veil Brides releases their fourth studio album, Black Veil Brides IV. It debuts at number 10 on the Billboard 200 chart.

=== November ===
- Foo Fighters's single "Something from Nothing" tops the Billboard Mainstream Rock songs, and stays there for 13 straight weeks, in a run that goes from November 2014 to February 2015. The song also simultaneously tops the Mainstream Rock and Alternative Songs chart. As of 2015, the band is the only band to top both simultaneously with a song in the 2010s, with the feat becoming rare due to alternative music's shift to less guitar-driven music.
- Foo Fighters release their eighth studio album, Sonic Highways. It debuts at number 2 on the Billboard 200 chart, selling 190,000 units.
- Pink Floyd releases their fifteenth and final studio album, The Endless River. It debuts at number 3 on the Billboard 200 chart, selling 170,000 units.

=== December ===
- AC/DC releases their sixteenth studio album, Rock or Bust. It debuts at the top of twelve separate country's all-format album charts, and debuts at number three on the US Billboard 200 chart, selling 174,000 album equivalent units in the US.

=== Year end ===
- The Pretty Reckless's single "Heaven Knows" is the number one song on the Billboard Mainstream Rock chart for the year of 2014. It is followed by Avenged Sevenfold's "Shepherd of Fire" and Nothing More's "This is the Time (Ballast)".

== Deaths ==
- Wayne Static, of Static-X, dies at 48, of an overdose mixture of alcohol and prescription drugs.
- Gustavo Cerati, main performer of Soda Stereo, dies from a coma that was induced in 2010.
- Tommy Ramone, of The Ramones, dies at 65 of cancer.

== Band breakups ==
- Pink Floyd
- Beady Eye (post-Oasis project by past members Liam Gallagher, Gem Archer, Andy Bell, and Chris Sharrock)
