= Going to Hell (disambiguation) =

Going to Hell is a 2014 album by The Pretty Reckless.

Going to Hell may also refer to:

- Going to Hell Tour, a concert tour by The Pretty Reckless
- "Going to Hell", a 1998 song by The Brian Jonestown Massacre from Strung Out in Heaven
- "Going to Hell", a 1998 song by Frankenstein Drag Queens from Planet 13 from Night of the Living Drag Queens
- "Going to Hell", a 1999 song by Today Is the Day from In the Eyes of God
- "Going to Hell", a 2012 song by Kathleen Edwards from Voyageur

== See also ==
- Go to Hell (disambiguation)
