= Who You Selling For Tour =

2016–17 concert tour by the Pretty Reckless

- Tour by The Pretty Reckless
- Promotional poster for the tour
- Associated album: Who You Selling For
- Start date: October 3, 2016
- End date: December 16, 2017
- Legs: 3
- No. of shows: 58 in North America; 53 in Europe; 6 in South America; 117 in total

The Pretty Reckless concert chronology
- Going to Hell Tour (2013–15); Who You Selling For Tour (2016–17)

Who You Selling For Tour was the fourth headlining tour by American rock band The Pretty Reckless in support of their third studio album, Who You Selling For.

== Opening acts ==
- Holy White Hounds (October 20 – December 6, 2016)
- Them Evils (October 20 – December 6, 2016)
- The Cruel Knives (January 19 – February 13, 2017)

== Set list ==
The following set list is representative of the show on November 12, 2016 in House of Blues in Cleveland.

1. "Follow Me Down"
2. "Since You're Gone"
3. "Oh My God"
4. "Hangman"
5. "Make Me Wanna Die"
6. "My Medicine"
7. "Prisoner"
8. "Sweet Things"
9. "Living in the Storm"
10. "Heaven Knows"
11. "Going to Hell"
12. "Take Me Down"

Encore

13. "Fucked Up World"
Notes
- The songs "Light Me Up" and "Who You Selling For" were added to the setlist on November 28, 2016 and played at every subsequent show.

== Controversy ==
After the passing of Chris Cornell, the band postponed their May 19 show at the Starland Ballroom in Sayreville, New Jersey just 3 hours before fans would be let into the venue. Many fans had already made their way (or were on the way) to the venue by the time the band announced the postponement, some traveling from out-of-state. The band was criticized for performing the next day in Camden, stating that "The show must go on". The band is also being criticized on social media due to the lack of communication about the rescheduled date of the Starland Ballroom show. Over a month later, the band had not yet released any information for the rescheduled show. After over a month of silence, the band finally announced the show's rescheduled date, November 10, 2017.

== Shows ==
List of concerts, showing date, city, country and venue
Date	City	Country	Venue
Europe
October 3, 2016	Paris	France	Le Divan du Monde
October 6, 2016	Berlin	Germany	Lido
October 10, 2016	London	England	Scala
North America
October 20, 2016 (Note: The concert of October 20, 2016 in Tulsa at Brady Theater was a part of Wizard World Comic Con.)	Tulsa	United States	Brady Theater
October 22, 2016 (Note: The concert of October 22, 2016 in Sacramento at Discovery Park was a part of Aftershock Festival.)	Sacramento	United States	Discovery Park
October 23, 2016	Las Vegas	United States	House of Blues
October 24, 2016	Scottsdale	United States	Livewire AZ
October 26, 2016	Lubbock	United States	Wild West
October 27, 2016	Dallas	United States	Gas Monkey Live
October 29, 2016 (Note: The concert of October 29, 2016 in New Orleans at City Park was a part of the Voodoo Experience.)	New Orleans	United States	City Park
October 30, 2016	Houston	United States	House of Blues
November 1, 2016	Atlanta	United States	Buckhead Theatre
November 3, 2016	Fort Lauderdale	United States	Revolution Live
November 4, 2016	Lake Buena Vista	United States	House of Blues
November 5, 2016	Destin	United States	Club LA
November 7, 2016	Nashville	United States	The Cannery Ballroom
November 10, 2016	Detroit	United States	Saint Andrew's Hall
November 11, 2016	Chicago	United States	House of Blues
November 12, 2016	Cleveland	United States	House of Blues
November 13, 2016	Toronto	Canada	Phoenix Concert Theatre
November 16, 2016	New York City	United States	Terminal 5
November 18, 2016	Baltimore	United States	Rams Head Live!
November 19, 2016	Niagara Falls	United States	The Rapids Theatre
November 21, 2016	Omaha	United States	Sokol Auditorium
November 22, 2016	Clive	United States	7 Flags Event Center
November 23, 2016	Maplewood	United States	Myth Live Event Center
November 25, 2016	Green Bay	United States	The Sandlot Entertainment Complex
November 26, 2016	Sioux City	United States	Anthem at Hard Rock Hotel & Casino
November 28, 2016	Denver	United States	Ogden Theatre
November 30, 2016	Salt Lake City	United States	The Depot
December 1, 2016	Boise	United States	Knitting Factory
December 2, 2016	Seattle	United States	The Showbox
December 3, 2016	Portland	United States	Roseland Theater
December 6, 2016	Los Angeles	United States	Mayan Theater
Europe
January 19, 2017	Nottingham	England	Rock City
January 20, 2017	Birmingham	England	O_{2} Institute Birmingham
January 21, 2017	London	England	The Forum
January 23, 2017	Glasgow	Scotland	O_{2} ABC Glasgow
January 24, 2017	Manchester	England	The Ritz
January 26, 2017	Paris	France	Bataclan
January 27, 2017	Utrecht	Netherlands	TivoliVredenburg
January 28, 2017	Leuven	Belgium	Het Depot
January 30, 2017	Cologne	Germany	Gloria-Theater
January 31, 2017	Hamburg	Germany	Uebel & Gefährlich
February 2, 2017	Berlin	Germany	Heimathafen Neukölln
February 3, 2017	Munich	Germany	Backstage Werk
February 4, 2017	Zürich	Switzerland	Dynamo Saal
February 6, 2017	Bologna	Italy	Estragon Club
February 7, 2017	Milan	Italy	Fabrique
February 9, 2017	Barcelona	Spain	Sala Apolo
February 10, 2017	Madrid	Spain	Teatro Barceló
February 13, 2017	Moscow	Russia	Stadium Live
South America
March 9, 2017	Rio de Janeiro	Brazil	Vivo Rio
March 10, 2017	São Paulo	Brazil	Espaço das Américas
March 11, 2017	Belo Horizonte	Brazil	Serraria Souza Pinto
March 12, 2017	Curitiba	Brazil	Teatro Positivo
March 14, 2017	Buenos Aires	Argentina	Teatro Vorterix
March 16, 2017	Santiago	Chile	Teatro Cariola
North America
March 18, 2017 (Note: The concert of March 18, 2017 in Mexico City at Foro Sol is a part of Vive Latino festival.)	Mexico City	Mexico	Foro Sol
April 25, 2017	Boston	United States	Paradise Rock Club
April 26, 2017	Washington, D.C.	United States	9:30 Club
April 27, 2017	Richmond	United States	The National
April 29, 2017 (Note: The concert of April 29, 2017 in Jacksonville at Metropolitan Park was a part of Welcome to Rockville festival.)	Jacksonville	United States	Metropolitan Park
April 30, 2017 (Note: The concert of April 30, 2017 in Fort Myers at JetBlue Park at Fenway South was a part of Fort Rock festival.)	Fort Myers	United States	JetBlue Park at Fenway South
May 2, 2017	Mobile	United States	Soul Kitchen
May 3, 2017	Atlanta	United States	Fox Theater
May 5, 2017 (Note: The concert of May 5, 2017 in Virginia Beach at Veterans United Home Loans Amphitheater at Virginia Beach was a part of FM99 Luanic Luau.)	Virginia Beach	United States	Veterans United Home Loans Amphitheater at Virginia Beach
May 6, 2017 (Note: The concert of May 6, 2017 in Concord at Rock City Campgrounds at Charlotte Motor Speedway was a part of Carolina Rebellion festival.)	Concord	United States	Rock City Campgrounds at Charlotte Motor Speedway
May 7, 2017	Chattanooga	United States	Track 29
May 10, 2017	Indianapolis	United States	Farmer's Bureau Insurance Lawn
May 11, 2017	St. Louis	United States	Delmar Hall
May 12, 2017 (Note: The concert on May 12, 2017 in Council Bluffs at Westfair Amphitheatre was a part of 89.7 The River's Rockfest.)	Council Bluffs	United States	Westfair Amphitheatre
May 13, 2017 (Note: The concert of May 13, 2017 in Somerset at Somerset Amphitheater was a part of Northern Invasion festival.)	Somerset	United States	Somerset Amphitheater
May 15, 2017	Peoria	United States	Exposition Gardens - Entertainment Tent
May 17, 2017	Detroit	United States	Fox Theatre
May 20, 2017 (Note: The concert of May 20, 2017 in Camden at BB&T Pavilion was a part of MMRBQ festival.)	Camden	United States	BB&T Pavilion
May 21, 2017 (Note: The concert of May 21, 2017 in Columbus at Mapfre Stadium was a part of Rock on the Range festival.)	Columbus	United States	Mapfre Stadium
May 24, 2017	Wichita	United States	The Cotillion Ballroom
May 26, 2017 (Note: The concert of May 26, 2017 in Pryor at Catch the Fever Festival Grounds was a part of Rocklahoma festival.)	Pryor	United States	Catch the Fever Festival Grounds
May 27, 2017 (Note: The concert of May 27, 2017 in San Antonio at AT&T Center was a part of River City Rockfest.)	San Antonio	United States	AT&T Center
May 28, 2017 (Note: The concert of May 28, 2017 in Dallas at Starplex Pavilion was a part of 97.1 The Eagle's BFD 2017 festival.)	Dallas	United States	Starplex Pavilion
June 24, 2017 (Note: The concert of June 24, 2017 in Auburn at White River Amphitheatre is a part of 99.9 Kisw Presents Pain In The Grass 2017 festival.)	Auburn	United States	White River Amphitheatre
July 14, 2017 (Note: The concert of July 14, 2017 in Oshkosh at Ford Festival Park is a part of Rock USA Festival.)	Oshkosh	United States	Ford Festival Park
July 17, 2017 (Note: The concert of July 17, 2017 in Cleveland at Quicken Loans Arena is a part of the Alternative Press Music Awards.)	Cleveland	United States	Quicken Loans Arena
July 20, 2017 (Note: The concert of July 20, 2017 in Walker at Moondance Festival Grounds is a part of Moondance Jam.)	Walker	United States	Moondance Festival Grounds
Europe		United States	
August 13, 2017 (Note: The concert of August 13, 2017 in Budapest at Old Buda Island is a part of Sziget Festival.)	Budapest	Hungary	Old Buda Island
August 15, 2017 (Note: The concert of August 15, 2017 in St. Pölten is a part of Frequency Festival.)	St. Pölten	Austria	Green Park
August 16, 2017	Stuttgart	Germany	Im Wizemann
August 18, 2017 (Note: The concert of August 18, 2017 in Gampel-Bratsch is a part of the Open Air Gampel festival.)	Gampel-Bratsch	Switzerland	Open Air Gampel
August 19, 2017 (Note: The concert of August 19, 2017 in Hasselt at Kempische Steenweg is a part of Pukkelpop.)	Hasselt	Belgium	Kempische Steenweg
August 20, 2017 (Note: The concert of August 20, 2017 in Biddinghuizen in a part of the Lowlands Festival.)	Biddinghuizen	Netherlands	Lowlands Festival
August 22, 2017	Münster	Germany	Skaters' Palace
August 23, 2017	Frankfurt	Germany	Gibson
August 25, 2017 (Note: The concert of August 25, 2017 in Boulogne-Billancourt is a part of the Rock en Seine festival.)	Boulogne-Billancourt	France	Rock en Seine
August 26, 2017 (Note: The concert of August 26, 2017 in Reading at Little John's Farm is a part of Reading Festival.)	Reading	England	Little John's Farm
August 27, 2017 (Note: The concert of August 27, 2017 in Leeds at Bramham Park is a part of Leeds Festival.)	Leeds	England	Bramham Park
North America
September 30, 2017 (Note: The concert of September 30, 2017 in Janesville at Southern Wisconsin Regional Airport is a part of Sonic Boom.)	Janesville	United States	Southern Wisconsin Regional Airport
October 1, 2017 (Note: The concert of October 1, 2017 in Louisville at Champions Park is a part of Louder Than Life Festival.)	Louisville	United States	Champions Park
November 10, 2017	Sayreville	United States	Starland Ballroom
Europe (Note: These concerts in Europe are supporting Stone Sour.)
November 15, 2017	Copenhagen	Denmark	The Grey Hall
November 16, 2017	Stockholm	Sweden	Annexet
November 17, 2017	Oslo	Norway	Sentrum Scene
November 19, 2017	Frankfurt	Germany	Jahrhunderthalle
November 20, 2017	Berlin	Germany	Columbiahalle
November 22, 2017	Brussels	Belgium	Ancienne Belgique
November 23, 2017	Eindhoven	Netherlands	Klokgebouw Cultuurhallen
November 26, 2017 (Note: This show was part of the Luxexpo Open Air series of concerts.)	Luxemburg	Luxemburg	Luxexpo The Box
November 27, 2017	Hamburg	Germany	Sporthalle
November 29, 2017	Birmingham	England	Barclaycard Arena
November 30, 2017	Leeds	England	First Direct Arena
December 1, 2017	Brighton	England	Brighton Centre
December 4, 2017	London	England	O2 Academy Brixton
December 5, 2017	Cardiff	Wales	Cardiff International Arena
December 6, 2017	London	England	O2 Academy Brixton
December 8, 2017	Glasgow	Scotland	SSE Hydro
December 10, 2017	Köln	Germany	Palladium
December 11, 2017	Munich	Germany	Zenith
December 12, 2017	Vienna	Austria	Gasometer
December 14, 2017	Zürich	Switzerland	Samsung Hall
December 15, 2017	Milan	Italy	Alcatraz
December 16, 2017	Paris	France	Le Trianon

=== Cancelations and rescheduled shows ===
November 15, 2016	Boston, Massachusetts	Paradise Rock Club	Rescheduled to April 25, 2017
March 7, 2017	Curitiba, Brazil	Teatro Positivo	Rescheduled to March 12, 2017
May 19, 2017	Sayreville, New Jersey	Starland Ballroom	Rescheduled to November 10, 2017
August 3, 2017	Chicago	Bottom Lounge	Cancelled
August 4, 2017	Chicago	Grant Park	Cancelled
September 21, 2017	Rio de Janeiro	City of Rock	Cancelled
