= Go to Hell =

Go to Hell may refer to:

== Film and television ==
- "Go to Hell" (CSI), an episode of the TV series CSI: Crime Scene Investigation
- "Go to Hell" (American Horror Story), an episode of the TV series American Horror Story
- Go to Hell!!, a 1997 Australian animated film
- Band Toh Baje Ga, a 2018 Pakistani television film, previously titled Go To Hell

== Comics ==
- Bill & Ted Go to Hell, a 2016 comics miniseries sequel to the 1991 film Bill & Ted's Bogus Journey
- Rick and Morty Go to Hell, a 2020 comics miniseries sequel to the 2014 Rick and Morty episode "Something Ricked This Way Comes"

== Music ==
- Go to Hell (EP), an EP by Vader
- "Go to Hell" (Carcass song)
- "Go to Hell" (Clinton Kane song)
- "Go to Hell" (Empress Of song)
- "Go to Hell" (Megadeth song)
- "Go to Hell" (Motörhead song)
- "Go to Hell", a song by Alice Cooper from Alice Cooper Goes to Hell
- "Go to Hell", a song by David Ford from Songs for the Road
- "Go to Hell", a song by Dolly Parton from For God and Country
- "Go to Hell", a song by Go Radio from Close the Distance
- "Go to Hell!", a song by GWAR from Beyond Hell
- "Go to Hell", a song by KMFDM from Naïve
- "Go to Hell", a song by Nina Simone from Silk & Soul
- "Go to Hell", a song by Post Malone from F-1 Trillion

== See also ==
- Going to Hell (disambiguation)
