= Bent to Fly =

Single by Slash featuring Myles Kennedy and the Conspirators

from the album World on Fire
- Released: July 1, 2014
- Genre: Hard rock, blues rock
- Length: 4:56
- Label: Dik Hayd
- Songwriter(s): Slash; Myles Kennedy
- Producer(s): Michael "Elvis" Baskette

Slash featuring Myles Kennedy and the Conspirators singles chronology
"World on Fire" (2014)	"Bent to Fly" (2014)	"30 Years to Life" (2014)

"Bent to Fly" is a song by American hard rock guitarist Slash, featuring vocalist Myles Kennedy and backing band The Conspirators. Written by Slash and Kennedy, it was released as the second single from the guitarist's third solo album (the second with Kennedy and The Conspirators), World on Fire. The song was used as the theme song for the 2014 National Rugby League Finals series, and Slash performed the song live at ANZ Stadium as pre-show entertainment for the league's grand final that year.

== Charts ==
Chart (2014)	Peak position
Canada Rock (Billboard)	48
US Rock Airplay (Billboard)	24

== Personnel ==
- Slash – guitars
- Myles Kennedy – lead vocals
- Todd Kerns – bass
- Brent Fitz – drums
