= Back to the River (song) =

Single by The Pretty Reckless featuring Warren Haynes

from the album Who You Selling For
- Released: June 13, 2017
- Recorded: 2016
- Genre: Southern rock; blues
- Length: 5:07
- Label: Razor & Tie
- Songwriter(s): Taylor Momsen; Ben Phillips
- Producer(s): Kato Khandwala

The Pretty Reckless singles chronology
"Oh My God" (2017)	"Back to the River" (2017)	"Death by Rock and Roll" (2020)

"Back to the River" is a song by American rock band The Pretty Reckless featuring American musician Warren Haynes. It was released to active rock radio in the United States on June 13, 2017, as the third and final single from the band's third studio album, Who You Selling For (2016). The song peaked at number 12 on Billboard's Mainstream Rock Songs chart.

== Background ==
The song was first written by frontwoman Taylor Momsen and guitarist Ben Phillips in 2015, during the last leg of the band's Going to Hell Tour. The two presented the song to the rest of the band with an impromptu rough performance on the tour bus, and upon everyone's approval, set it aside as one of the songs to be recorded for their next studio album, which would become Who You Selling For. Recording for the album spanned the second half of 2015 and the first half of 2016. The band recorded the song live together in the studio, but left certain sections open for additional lead guitar work to be added later on.

The band discussed collaborating with an outside musician on the track. The song's southern rock sound, along with the members collective appreciation of the genre, lead the band to decide to reach out to Warren Haynes to play on the track, previously known for working with The Allman Brothers and Govt Mule. The band contacted him through a shared connection, and Haynes agreed to play on the track, recording his parts and then sending it to the band. The band was very impressed with the direction he took with his additions, feeling that it is improved the song greatly, and the parts were kept on the final studio version of the song.

== Themes and composition ==
Hayne's parts were played using a slide guitar. The song was described as having elements of southern rock and blues genre of music.

== Charts ==
Chart (2017)	Peak position
US Mainstream Rock (Billboard)	12
