= Take Me Down (The Pretty Reckless song) =

Single by the Pretty Reckless

from the album Who You Selling For
- Released: July 15, 2016
- Recorded: 2015
- Studio: Water Music (Hoboken, New Jersey)
- Length: 4:13
- Label: Razor & Tie
- Songwriters: Taylor Momsen; Ben Phillips
- Producer: Kato Khandwala

The Pretty Reckless singles chronology
"Follow Me Down" (2015)	"Take Me Down" (2016)	"Oh My God" (2016)

Music video
- "Take Me Down" on YouTube

"Take Me Down" is a song by American rock band the Pretty Reckless from their third studio album, Who You Selling For (2016). It was released on July 15, 2016, as the album's lead single. The song topped the Billboard Mainstream Rock Songs chart in 2016, the band's fourth single to do so at the time, following "Heaven Knows", "Messed Up World (F'd Up World)", and "Follow Me Down".

== Background ==
The song was released as the lead single for the band's third studio album Who You Selling For in July 2016. The single's artwork was also revealed, keeping with the band's past allusion to religion and the devil, this time being consisting of a human hand shaking hands with a red demonic hand. A music video for the song was released on September 29, 2016, which continued the theme of allusions to a diabolical nature. The video consists of footage of the band performing in a stylized black and white setting, with the only color visible being a few things in red, including some parts of the background, and frontwoman Taylor Momsen's lips and pendant necklace. In October 2016, the song topped the Billboard Mainstream Rock Songs, making the band the first to ever send their first four songs on the chart to the number one spot. The song also extended the band's record for most number ones on the chart by a female-fronted band.

The band performed the song on Conan O'Brien's late-night talk show Conan on February 28, 2016.

== Themes and composition ==
The song tells the story of a musician who sold her soul to the devil in exchange for success in music, harking back to the old legend of musicians going down to the crossroads in the Mississippi Delta to make deals with the devil for fame and fortune.

== Credits and personnel ==
- Taylor Momsen – lead vocals, rhythm guitar
- Ben Phillips – lead guitar
- Mark Damon – bass
- Jamie Perkins – drums

== Charts ==
=== Weekly charts ===
Weekly chart performance for "Take Me Down"
Chart (2016)	Peak position
Canada Rock (Billboard)	5
US Hot Rock & Alternative Songs (Billboard)	27
US Rock & Alternative Airplay (Billboard)	13

=== Year-end charts ===
Year-end chart performance for "Take Me Down"
Chart (2016)	Position
US Hot Rock Songs (Billboard)	81
US Rock Airplay (Billboard)	38

== Release history ==
Release dates and formats for "Take Me Down"
Region	Date	Format	Label	Ref.
Various	July 15, 2016	Digital download	Razor & Tie	
United States	July 19, 2016	Active rock radio	Razor & Tie	
