= Mz. Hyde =

Single by Halestorm

from the album The Strange Case Of...
- Released: October 21, 2013
- Genre: Hard rock
- Length: 3:22
- Songwriters: Lzzy Hale; Scott Stevens

Halestorm singles chronology
"Here's to Us" (2013)	"Mz. Hyde" (2013)	"Apocalyptic" (2015)

"Mz. Hyde" is a song by the hard rock band Halestorm. It is taken from their second album, The Strange Case Of... and was released as a single on October 21, 2013. The music video for the song was released to YouTube on February 4, 2014.

According to Lzzy Hale, she wrote "Mz. Hyde" as a reflection of having two sides to her life, both on and off stage—she said that "For years I've been writing about these two sides of myself, and I wanted to capture that in a song". The title is an allusion to the novel Strange Case of Dr Jekyll and Mr Hyde.

== Charts ==
Chart (2014)	Peak position
US Mainstream Rock	15
