= Going to Hell Tour =

2013–15 concert tour by the Pretty Reckless

- Tour by The Pretty Reckless
- Promotional poster for the UK leg of the tour
- Associated album: Going to Hell
- Start date: September 20, 2013
- End date: June 3, 2015
- No. of shows: 158 in North America; 36 in Europe; 194 in total

The Pretty Reckless concert chronology
- The Medicine Tour (2012); Going to Hell Tour (2013–15); Who You Selling For Tour (2016–17)

Going to Hell Tour is the third headlining tour by American rock band the Pretty Reckless in support of their second studio album, Going to Hell.

== Opening acts ==
- Born Cages (September 20, 2013)
- Heaven's Basement (September 22 – November 11, 2013)
- Louna (September 25 – November 3, 2013)
- Falling Through April (September 26 – October 15, 2014)

== Setlist ==
The following set list is representative of the show on September 10, 2014, in House of Blues in Boston.

1. "Follow Me Down"
2. "Since You're Gone"
3. "Why'd You Bring a Shotgun to the Party "
4. "Sweet Things"
5. "Cold Blooded"
6. "Dear Sister"
7. "Absolution"

Acoustic

8. "Blame Me"
9. "Zombie"
10. "Waiting for a Friend"

Electric

11. "Kill Me"
12. "Heaven Knows"
13. "Make Me Wanna Die"
14. "Going to Hell"

Encore

15. "My Medicine"
16. "House on a Hill"
17. "Fucked Up World"

== Tour dates ==
Date	City	Country	Venue
North America
September 20, 2013	Huntington	United States	The Paramount Theater
September 22, 2013	Charlotte	United States	The Fillmore Theater
September 23, 2013	Atlanta	United States	The Masquerade
September 25, 2013	Jacksonville	United States	Jack Rabbits
September 26, 2013	Tampa	United States	The Orpheum Theater
September 27, 2013	Fort Lauderdale	United States	Revolution Live
September 28, 2013	Orlando	United States	The Social
September 29, 2013	Pensacola	United States	Vinyl Music Hall
September 30, 2013	New Orleans	United States	House of Blues
October 2, 2013	Houston	United States	House of Blues
October 3, 2013	Austin	United States	The Parish
October 4, 2013	Dallas	United States	House of Blues
October 5, 2013	San Antonio	United States	Sam's Burger Joint
October 7, 2013	Scottsdale	United States	Pub Rock Live
October 8, 2013	San Francisco	United States	Regency Ballroom
October 9, 2013	San Diego	United States	House of Blues
October 10, 2013	Anaheim	United States	House of Blues
October 11, 2013	Los Angeles	United States	House of Blues
October 14, 2013	Portland	United States	Hawthorne Theatre
October 15, 2013	Seattle	United States	El Corazon
October 16, 2013	Vancouver	Canada	Rio Theatre
October 18, 2013	Edmonton	Canada	The Starlite Room
October 19, 2013	Calgary	Canada	The Den
October 20, 2013	Saskatoon	Canada	Louis' Pub
October 21, 2013	Winnipeg	Canada	West End Cultural Centre
October 23, 2013	Minneapolis	United States	Varsity Theatre
October 25, 2013	Detroit	United States	St. Andrew's Hall
October 26, 2013	Indianapolis	United States	Deluxe at ONC
October 27, 2013	Chicago	United States	House of Blues Chicago
October 29, 2013	Columbus	United States	A&R Bar
October 30, 2013	Pittsburgh	United States	Stage AE
October 31, 2013	Cleveland	United States	House of Blues Cleveland
November 1, 2013	Cincinnati	United States	Bogart's
November 3, 2013	Washington	United States	The Fillmore Silver Spring
November 4, 2013	Toronto	Canada	Phoenix Concert Theatre
November 5, 2013	Quebec City	Canada	Le Cercle
November 8, 2013	Montreal	Canada	Corona Theatre
November 9, 2013	New York City	United States	Irving Plaza
November 10, 2013	Philadelphia	United States	The TLA
November 11, 2013	Boston	United States	Paradise Rock Club
Fall Out Boy's Save Rock and Roll European Tour 2014
February 28, 2014	Madrid	Spain	Palacio Vistalegre
March 1, 2014	Barcelona	Spain	Palau Sant Jordi
March 2, 2014	Toulouse	France	Le Phare
March 4, 2014	Esch-sur-Alzette	Luxembourg	Rockhal
Europe
March 5, 2014	Zürich	Switzerland	Komplex Klub
Fall Out Boy's Save Rock and Roll European Tour 2014
March 6, 2014	Lille	France	Zénith de Lille
March 7, 2014	Cologne	Germany	Cologne Palladium
March 8, 2014	Amsterdam	Netherlands	Heineken Music Hall
March 11, 2014	Brussels	Belgium	Ancienne Belgique
March 12, 2014	Paris	France	Zénith de Paris
March 15, 2014	Cardiff	Wales	Motorpoint Arena Cardiff
March 16, 2014	Birmingham	England	National Indoor Arena
March 17, 2014	Manchester	England	Phones 4u Arena
March 20, 2014	London	England	Wembley Arena
March 21, 2014	Newcastle	England	Metro Radio Arena
March 22, 2014	Glasgow	Scotland	The SSE Hydro
Europe
March 24, 2014	London	England	Electric Ballroom
March 26, 2014	Hamburg	Germany	Uebel & Gefährlich
March 27, 2014	Berlin	Germany	Lido Berlin
March 28, 2014	Milan	Italy	Lime Light
North America
April 16, 2014	Brooklyn	United States	Music Hall of Williamsburg
April 23, 2014	Los Angeles	United States	Club Nokia
April 25, 2014	Tampa	United States	Amalie Arena
April 26, 2014	Fort Myers	United States	JetBlue Park at Fenway South
April 27, 2014	Jacksonville	United States	Jacksonville Metropolitan Park
May 9, 2014	Gulfport	United States	Jones Park
May 10, 2014	Shreveport	United States	Shreveport Municipal Memorial Auditorium
May 11, 2014	Des Moines	United States	Wells Fargo Arena
May 13, 2014	Omaha	United States	The Waiting Room Lounge
May 16, 2014	Peoria	United States	Peoria Civic Center
May 17, 2014	Columbus	United States	Columbus Crew Stadium
May 18, 2014	Inwood	United States	Shiley Acres
May 20, 2014	Augusta	United States	Sky City
May 22, 2014	Little Rock	United States	Revolution Music Room
May 23, 2014	Pryor	United States	Catch the Fever Music Festival Ground
May 25, 2014	Anthony	United States	Wet-N-Wild Waterworld
May 28, 2014	Las Vegas	United States	Vinyl at Hard Rock Hotel
May 30, 2014	Denver	United States	Fillmore Auditorium
May 31, 2014	Kansas City	United States	Liberty Memorial
June 1, 2014	Dallas	United States	Gexa Energy Pavilion
Europe
June 4, 2014	Vaud	Switzerland	Crans-près-Céligny
June 7, 2014	Nürburg	Germany	Nürburgring
June 8, 2014	Nuremberg	Germany	Zeppelinfeld
June 9, 2014	Saint Petersburg	Russia	A2
June 10, 2014	Moscow	Russia	Stadium Live
June 14, 2014	Newport	England	Seaclose Park
June 15, 2014	Leicester	England	Donington Park
North America
June 26, 2014	Canton	United States	Palace Theatre
June 27, 2014	Milwaukee	United States	Marcus Amphitheater
June 28, 2014	Alix	Canada	Tail Creek Festival Grounds
July 12, 2014	Quebec City	Canada	Plains of Abraham
July 19, 2014	Cadott	United States	Chippewa Valley Festival Grounds
August 8, 2014	Sturgis	United States	Buffalo Chip Campground
August 9, 2014	Cardwell	United States	Cardwell Festival Grounds
September 5, 2014	Orlando	United States	House of Blues
September 6, 2014	Charlotte	United States	PNC Music Pavilion
September 10, 2014	Boston	United States	House of Blues
September 12, 2014	Silver Spring	United States	The Fillmore Silver Spring
September 13, 2014	Philadelphia	United States	The TLA
September 15, 2014	Atlanta	United States	The Masquerade
September 17, 2014	Myrtle Beach	United States	House of Blues
September 20, 2014	Las Vegas	United States	MGM Grand Garden Arena
September 21, 2014	Fort Lauderdale	United States	Revolution Live
September 23, 2014	Mobile	United States	Soul Kitchen
September 24, 2014	New Orleans	United States	House of Blues
September 26, 2014	Austin	United States	Emo's Austin
September 27, 2014	Dallas	United States	House of Blues
September 28, 2014	Houston	United States	House of Blues
September 30, 2014	Tempe	United States	Marquee Theatre
October 2, 2014	Reno	United States	Knitting Factory
October 3, 2014	Portland	United States	Wonder Ballroom
October 4, 2014	Seattle	United States	El Corazon
October 5, 2014	Vancouver	Canada	Vogue Theatre
October 8, 2014	San Francisco	United States	The Regency Center
October 10, 2014	Los Angeles	United States	Wiltern Theatre
October 11, 2014	Anaheim	United States	House of Blues
October 12, 2014	San Diego	United States	House of Blues
October 15, 2014	Las Vegas	United States	Vinyl at Hard Rock Hotel
October 16, 2014	Salt Lake City	United States	The Complex
October 17, 2014	Denver	United States	Fillmore Auditorium
October 19, 2014	Kansas City	United States	Arvest Bank Theatre at The Midland
October 21, 2014	Minneapolis	United States	First Avenue
October 23, 2014	St. Louis	United States	The Pageant
October 24, 2014	Chicago	United States	House of Blues
October 25, 2014	Indianapolis	United States	Deluxe at Old National Centre
October 26, 2014	Detroit	United States	Saint Andrew's Hall
October 28, 2014	Columbus	United States	Newport Music Hall
October 29, 2014	Cleveland	United States	House of Blues
October 30, 2014	Toronto	Canada	Toronto Sound Academy
November 1, 2014	Montreal	Canada	L'Olympia de Montreal
November 4, 2014	Burlington	United States	Higher Ground
November 6, 2014	Portland	United States	The Asylum
November 7, 2014	Hampton Beach	United States	Hampton Beach Casino Ballroom
November 8, 2014	New York City	United States	Best Buy Theater
Europe
November 17, 2014	Nottingham	England	Rock City
November 18, 2014	Leeds	England	O_{2} Academy Leeds
November 19, 2014	Manchester	England	Manchester Academy
November 20, 2014	Glasgow	Scotland	O_{2} Academy Glasgow
November 22, 2014	Oxford	England	O_{2} Academy Oxford
November 23, 2014	Bristol	England	O_{2} Academy Bristol
November 24, 2014	Birmingham	England	Digbeth Institute
November 26, 2014	London	England	Brixton Academy
North America
February 14, 2015	Allentown	United States	PPL Center
February 15, 2015	Manchester	United States	Verizon Wireless Arena
February 17, 2015	Ottawa	Canada	Canadian Tire Centre
February 18, 2015	Montreal	Canada	Bell Centre
February 21, 2015	London	Canada	Budweiser Gardens
February 22, 2015	Toronto	Canada	Air Canada Centre
February 24, 2015	Grand Rapids	United States	Van Andel Arena
February 25, 2015	Louisville	United States	KFC Yum! Center
February 27, 2015	Columbus	United States	Nationwide Arena
February 28, 2015	Moline	United States	iWireless Center
March 2, 2015	Kansas City	United States	Sprint Center
March 3, 2015	Sioux Falls	United States	Denny Stanford Premier Center
March 5, 2015	Omaha	United States	CenturyLink Center Omaha
March 6, 2015	Minneapolis	United States	Target Center
March 8, 2015	Winnipeg	Canada	MTS Centre
March 10, 2015	Saskatoon	Canada	Credit Union Centre
March 12, 2015	Calgary	Canada	Scotiabank Saddledome
March 13, 2015	Edmonton	Canada	Rexall Place
March 15, 2015	Vancouver	Canada	Rogers Arena
April 18, 2015	Tucson	United States	Kino Veterans Memorial Stadium
April 19, 2015	Lubbock	United States	Lone Star Amphitheater
April 22, 2015	Nashville	United States	Ryman Auditorium
April 23, 2015	Atlanta	United States	Tabernacle
April 24, 2015	Tampa	United States	Amalie Arena
April 25, 2015	Fort Myers	United States	jetBlue Park at Fenway South
April 26, 2015	Jacksonville	United States	Jacksonville Metropolitan Park
April 28, 2015	Birmingham	United States	Iron City
April 29, 2015	Evansville	United States	Victory Theatre
May 1, 2015	Virginia Beach	United States	Farm Bureau Live at Virginia Beach
May 2, 2015	Baltimore	United States	Pier Six Pavilion
May 3, 2015	Concord	United States	Charlotte Motor Speedway
May 5, 2015	Albany	United States	Washington Avenue Armory
May 6, 2015	Pittsburgh	United States	Stage AE
May 8, 2015	Las Vegas	United States	MGM Resorts Festival Grounds
May 9, 2015	Somerset	United States	Somerset Amphitheater
May 10, 2015	Rockford	United States	Coronado Performing Arts Center
May 12, 2015	Boston	United States	House of Blues
May 13, 2015	Portland	United States	State Theater
May 15, 2015	Asbury Park	United States	Stone Pony Summerstage
May 16, 2015	Camden	United States	Susquehanna Bank Center
May 17, 2015	Columbus	United States	Columbus Crew Stadium
May 19, 2015	Flint	United States	James H. Whiting Auditorium
May 20, 2015	Saint Louis	United States	The Pageant
May 22, 2015	North Little Rock	United States	Riverstage Amphitheater
May 23, 2015	Pryor	United States	Rocklahoma
May 24, 2015	San Antonio	United States	AT&T Center
May 26, 2015	Corpus Christi	United States	American Bank Center
May 27, 2015	Houston	United States	Bayou Music Center
May 29, 2015	Omaha	United States	Westfair Amphitheatre
May 30, 2015	Kansas City	United States	Liberty Memorial
June 2, 2015	Denver	United States	Fillmore Auditorium
June 3, 2015	Magna	United States	The Great Saltair

=== Cancellations and rescheduled shows ===
August 16, 2013	Hasselt	Pukkelpop	Cancelled
August 19, 2013	Utrecht	Tivoli	Cancelled
August 22, 2013	London	Electric Ballroom	Cancelled
August 23, 2013	Reading	Reading Festival	Cancelled
August 24, 2013	Leeds	Leeds Festival	Cancelled
January 29, 2014	Lincoln	Bourbon Theater (SnoCore Tour)	Cancelled
January 30, 2014	Des Moines	Wooly's (SnoCore Tour)	Cancelled
February 1, 2014	Milwaukee	The Rave (SnoCore Tour)	Cancelled
February 2, 2014	Joliet	Mojoes (SnoCore Tour)	Cancelled
February 4, 2014	Flint	The Machine Shop (SnoCore Tour)	Cancelled
February 5, 2014	Toronto	Phoenix Concert Theatre (SnoCore Tour)	Cancelled
February 7, 2014	Rochester	The Montage Live Music Hall (SnoCore Tour)	Cancelled
February 8, 2014	Worcester	Worcester Palladium (SnoCore Tour)	Cancelled
February 9, 2014	Albany	Upstage Concert Hall (SnoCore Tour)	Cancelled
February 11, 2014	Baltimore	Baltimore Sound Stage (SnoCore Tour)	Cancelled
February 12, 2014	New York City	Irving Plaza (SnoCore Tour)	Cancelled
February 13, 2014	Allentown	Maingate Nightclub (SnoCore Tour)	Cancelled
February 14, 2014	University Park	Levels Nightclub (SnoCore Tour)	Cancelled
February 15, 2014	Lancaster	Chameleon Club (SnoCore Tour)	Cancelled
February 17, 2014	Pittsburgh	The Altar Bar (SnoCore Tour)	Cancelled
February 19, 2014	Denver	Summit Music Hall (SnoCore Tour)	Cancelled
February 21, 2014	Las Vegas	Vinyl at Hard Rock Hotel (SnoCore Tour)	Cancelled
February 22, 2014	Santa Ana	The Observatory (SnoCore Tour)	Cancelled
February 23, 2014	Los Angeles	House of Blues West Hollywood (SnoCore Tour)	Cancelled
June 13, 2014	Warsaw	Orange Warsaw Festival	Canceled
May 30, 2015	Kansas City	Liberty Memorial	Canceled
May 31, 2015	Dallas	Gexa Energy Pavilion	Cancelled
