= Who You Selling For =

2016 studio album by the Pretty Reckless

Studio album by the Pretty Reckless
- Released: October 21, 2016
- Recorded: 2015–2016
- Studio: Water Music (Hoboken, New Jersey)
- Genre: Hard rock; blues
- Length: 51:46
- Label: Razor & Tie
- Producer: Kato Khandwala

The Pretty Reckless chronology
Going to Hell (2014)	Who You Selling For (2016)	Death by Rock and Roll (2021)

Singles from Who You Selling For
- 1. "Take Me Down" Released: July 15, 2016; 2. "Oh My God" Released: September 9, 2016; 3. "Back to the River" Released: June 13, 2017

Who You Selling For is the third studio album by the American rock band the Pretty Reckless, released on October 21, 2016, by Razor & Tie. The album reached number 13 on the US Billboard 200 and number 23 on the UK Albums Chart. Its lead single, "Take Me Down", topped the US Billboard Mainstream Rock chart in October 2016. The album also spawned the singles "Oh My God" and "Back to the River".

== Background and release ==
In early September 2015, frontwoman Taylor Momsen confirmed that the band was working on new material in the studio. Momsen co-wrote all the songs with lead guitarist Ben Phillips, while the album was produced by longtime collaborator Kato Khandwala. Writing for the album began shortly after the completion of two years of touring in support of the band's second studio album, Going to Hell (2014). "We had so much we wanted to say, it was like shaking a can of soda on tour, and then when we started writing we cracked the seal", Momsen said. "The touring life is very isolating. You look at the world through a bus or airplane window. But music is the healing factor. It's the one thing that is grounding and a true companion through the forest. It saved us—again."

The album's title, Who You Selling For, and its release date were officially announced on August 9, 2016. Regarding the title, Momsen said, "For me, it's a question that challenges what I'm doing with my life. It questions the meaning of my actions whatever they are. It also defines the record in a grander way by asking the listener to look into the meaning of each song past the obvious." She also explained that the cover art is "a very direct representation of how I feel at the moment. I wanted it to be artistic and emote how I'm feeling at this junction in my life. An artist came to me with this image, and it was just perfect! The artist is a close friend who wants to remain anonymous, but they had heard the record and worked based off of [sic] the music to create that image."

The lead single from Who You Selling For, "Take Me Down", was released digitally on July 15, 2016, and was serviced to US active rock radio on July 19. When the single topped Billboard's Mainstream Rock chart on the issue dated November 5, 2016, the Pretty Reckless became the first act to send its first four entries to number one on that chart, as well as the female-fronted group with the most number ones. "Oh My God" was released on September 9, 2016, as the album's second single. In support of the album, the band has embarked on the Who You Selling For Tour across the United States, which kicked off on October 20, 2016, in Tulsa, Oklahoma. A third single, "Back to the River", was sent to US active rock radio on June 13, 2017.

== Critical reception ==
Professional ratings
Review scores
Source	Rating
AllMusic	4/5 stars
Rock Sound	6/10

Stephen Thomas Erlewine of AllMusic opined that the band "have decided to grow up on Who You Selling For and, thanks to their inherent muscle and the sharp articulation of producer Kato Khandwala, this self-conscious maturation succeeds." Chad Bowar of Loudwire wrote that the album "continues the maturation of [the band's] sound, delivering a varied batch of memorable songs", concluding, "With too many hard rock bands sounding sterile and calculated, it makes the rawness, emotion and originality of Who You Selling For stand out even more." Emma Matthews of Rock Sound commented that "The Pretty Reckless may have evolved over the years, but one trait that remains is frontwoman Taylor Momsen's fearlessness in the face of change."

== Commercial performance ==
Who You Selling For debuted at number 13 on the US Billboard 200 with 19,580 copies sold in pure album sales. The album debuted at number 23 on the UK Albums Chart, selling 4,157 copies in its first week.

== Track listing ==
All tracks are written by Taylor Momsen and Ben Phillips.

No.	Title	Length
1.	"The Walls Are Closing In / Hangman"	6:36
2.	"Oh My God"	3:25
3.	"Take Me Down"	4:13
4.	"Prisoner"	3:00
5.	"Wild City"	4:48
6.	"Back to the River" (featuring Warren Haynes)	5:07
7.	"Who You Selling For"	2:47
8.	"Bedroom Window"	2:04
9.	"Living in the Storm"	5:01
10.	"Already Dead"	4:16
11.	"The Devil's Back"	7:06
12.	"Mad Love"	3:23
Total length:		51:46

Japanese edition bonus track
No.	Title	Length
13.	"The Devil's Back" (demo version)	7:09
Total length:		58:55

== Personnel ==
Credits adapted from the liner notes of Who You Selling For.

The Pretty Reckless

- Taylor Momsen – lead vocals
- Ben Phillips – guitars, backing vocals
- Mark Damon – bass
- Jamie Perkins – drums

Additional personnel

- Kato Khandwala – production, recording, mixing
- Sean "Gingineer" Kelly – additional engineering
- Ted Jensen – mastering
- Christian Pelaez – recording assistance
- Noel Herbolario – recording assistance
- Josh Gomersall – recording assistance
- Jay Colangelo – drum teching
- Demon Drums – drum teching
- JD Findley – guitar teching
- Ryan Smith – vinyl cut
- Warren Haynes – lead guitar (track 6)
- Andy Burton – keyboards, organ, piano
- Tommy Byrnes – guitar (track 6)
- Janice Pendarvis – background vocals (tracks 3, 5)
- Jenny Douglas-Foote – background vocals (tracks 3, 5)
- Sophia Ramos – background vocals (tracks 3, 5)
- Adam Larson – art direction

== Charts ==
=== Weekly charts ===
Weekly chart performance for Who You Selling For
Chart (2016)	Peak position
Australian Albums (ARIA)	33
Austrian Albums (Ö3 Austria)	42
Belgian Albums (Ultratop Flanders)	192
Belgian Albums (Ultratop Wallonia)	133
Canadian Albums (Billboard)	12
French Albums (SNEP)	90
German Albums (Offizielle Top 100)	38
Italian Albums (FIMI)	96
Japanese Albums (Oricon)	162
New Zealand Albums (RMNZ)	24
Scottish Albums (OCC)	14
Swiss Albums (Schweizer Hitparade)	45
UK Albums (OCC)	23
UK Rock & Metal Albums (OCC)	2
US Billboard 200	13
US Top Alternative Albums (Billboard)	2
US Top Hard Rock Albums (Billboard)	3
US Top Rock Albums (Billboard)	4

=== Year-end charts ===
Year-end chart performance for Who You Selling For
Chart (2016)	Position
US Top Hard Rock Albums (Billboard)	38
