= Take Out the Gunman =

Single by Chevelle

from the album La Gárgola
- Released: February 4, 2014
- Genre: Alternative metal; hard rock
- Length: 4:22
- Label: Epic
- Songwriters: Pete Loeffler; Sam Loeffler
- Producer: Joe Barresi

Chevelle singles chronology
"Fizgig" (2012)	"Take Out the Gunman" (2014)	"Hunter Eats Hunter" (2014)

Lyric video
- "Take Out the Gunman" on YouTube

"Take Out the Gunman" is a song by American rock band Chevelle. It is the lead single from the band's seventh studio album, La Gárgola. The song debuted on February 3, 2014, via the band's Vevo and YouTube channel, with the single being released the next day.

== Critical reception ==
Sound and Motion Magazine gave the song a positive review. They state "From the tones, the rhythms, the vocal delivery, it’s all there, if it’s been in a Chevelle song, any Chevelle song, it somehow got crammed into here, with a few minor, minor twists. Yet still sounds fresh and invigorating." They conclude that the track leaves you wanting more. Loudwire ranked it the fourth greatest Chevelle song.

== Charts ==
=== Weekly charts ===
Weekly chart performance for "Take Out the Gunman"
Chart (2013–2014)	Peak position
Canada Rock (Billboard)	29
US Hot Rock & Alternative Songs (Billboard)	25
US Rock & Alternative Airplay (Billboard)	8

=== Year-end charts ===
Year-end chart performance for "Take Out the Gunman"
Chart (2014)	Position
US Hot Rock & Alternative Songs (Billboard)	70
US Rock Airplay (Billboard)	30
