= Messed Up World (F'd Up World) =

Single by the Pretty Reckless

from the album Going to Hell
- Released: April 22, 2014
- Recorded: 2013
- Studio: Water Music (Hoboken, New Jersey)
- Genre: Rock
- Length: 4:15
- Label: Razor & Tie
- Songwriters: Taylor Momsen; Ben Phillips
- Producer: Kato Khandwala

The Pretty Reckless singles chronology
| "Heaven Knows" (2014) | "Messed Up World (F'd Up World)" (2014) | "Follow Me Down" (2014) |

"Messed Up World (F'd Up World)" (titled "Fucked Up World" in the album version) is a song by American rock band the Pretty Reckless from their second studio album, Going to Hell (2014). It was released on April 22, 2014, as the album's third single. The track topped Billboard's Mainstream Rock Songs chart in 2014.

== Background ==
The song was the last one to be completed for their 2014 album Going to Hell, originally being written on an acoustic guitar. The song was chosen as the second single from the album, being released in April 2014. A music video for the song, directed by frontwoman Taylor Momsen, was filmed in Miami on April 30, and released in June 2014. The video starts off as a light-hearted day at the beach, initially as an ironic counter-point to the song's lyrical material, but eventually begins to allude to various provocative situations that the song lyrically covers.

In September 2014, "Messed Up World" topped Billboard's Mainstream Rock Songs chart, making the band the only female-fronted band to ever top the chart with their first two hits, with the song being the second to top the chart after their prior single "Heaven Knows". "Messed Up World", along with "Heaven Knows" and Halestorm's 2013 single "Freak Like Me", are the only female front bands to top the chart since Alannah Myles' "Black Velvet". Additionally, no female-fronted group, or female musician, have had two back-to-back topping songs since the 1980s.

== Track listing ==
Digital download
| No. | Title | Length |
|---|---|---|
| 1. | "Fucked Up World" | 4:17 |
| 2. | "Messed Up World (F'd Up World)" | 4:15 |

== Credits and personnel ==
Credits adapted from the liner notes of Going to Hell.

The Pretty Reckless

- Taylor Momsen – lead vocals
- Ben Phillips – guitars, backing vocals
- Mark Damon – bass
- Jamie Perkins – drums

Additional personnel

- Kato Khandwala – production, mixing
- Ted Jensen – mastering

== Charts ==
=== Weekly charts ===
Weekly chart performance for "Messed Up World (F'd Up World)"
| Chart (2014) | Peak position |
|---|---|
| Canada Rock (Billboard) | 41 |
| US Hot Rock & Alternative Songs (Billboard) | 44 |
| US Rock & Alternative Airplay (Billboard) | 18 |

=== Year-end charts ===
Year-end chart performance for "Messed Up World (F'd Up World)"
| Chart (2014) | Position |
|---|---|
| US Rock Airplay (Billboard) | 50 |
