= Freak Like Me (Halestorm song) =

2013 song by Halestorm

Single by Halestorm

from the album The Strange Case Of...
- Released: January 8, 2013
- Length: 3:38
- Label: Atlantic
- Songwriters: Johnny Andrews; Lzzy Hale; Rob Graves
- Producer: Howard Benson

Halestorm singles chronology
"I Miss the Misery" (2012)	"Freak Like Me" (2013)	"Here's to Us" (2013)

Music video
- "Freak Like Me" on YouTube

"Freak Like Me" is a song by American rock band Halestorm. It was released on January 8, 2013, as the third single from their second album, The Strange Case Of.... The song topped the Billboard Mainstream Rock chart in April 2013.

== Reception ==
Liz Ramanand of Loudwire described "Freak Like Me" as "a straight up anthem for misfits", and praised frontwoman Lzzy Hale's vocals and the song's "sleazy guitar riffs, crashing cymbals and deep bass lines". In 2015, Loudwire ranked the song third on its list of Halestorm's 10 best songs.

== Music video ==
The music video, directed by Rob Fenn, premiered on February 11, 2013. Hale said the video was intended to thank and celebrate the band's fans after what she described as a year in which "so many dreams came true" for Halestorm. It features a montage of the band's world travels during 2012, including behind-the-scenes tour footage and footage of the band performing at clubs and outdoor festival stages.

== Live performances ==
Halestorm performed "Freak Like Me" and "Love Bites (So Do I)" on the January 29, 2013, episode of Jimmy Kimmel Live!, with "Freak Like Me" made available as a web-exclusive bonus performance.

== Chart performance ==
"Freak Like Me" was Halestorm's first number-one song on the Billboard Mainstream Rock chart dated April 13, 2013. Elsewhere on Billboard, it peaked at number 17 on the Rock & Alternative Airplay chart and number 48 on the Hot Rock & Alternative Songs chart.

== Personnel ==
Credits adapted from Apple Music.

Halestorm

- Lzzy Hale – lead vocals, rhythm guitar, piano
- Arejay Hale – drums, backing vocals
- Joe Hottinger – lead guitar, backing vocals
- Josh Smith – bass, backing vocals

Additional musicians

- Howard Benson – keyboards, programming
- Lenny Skolnik – keyboards, programming

Production and engineering

- Howard Benson – producer
- Ted Jensen – mastering engineer
- Chris Lord-Alge – mixing engineer
- Mike Plotnikoff – recording engineer
- Jimmy Fahey – assistant engineer
- Paul DeCarli – editing engineer, additional engineer
- Hatsukazu Inagaki – additional engineer

== Charts ==
=== Weekly charts ===
Weekly chart performance for "Freak Like Me"
Chart (2013)	Peak position
US Rock & Alternative Airplay (Billboard)	17
US Hot Rock & Alternative Songs (Billboard)	48
US Mainstream Rock (Billboard)	1

=== Year-end charts ===
Year-end chart performance for "Freak Like Me"
Chart (2013)	Position
US Mainstream Rock Airplay (Billboard)	13

== Certifications ==
Certifications for "Freak Like Me"
Region	Certification	Certified units/sales
United States (RIAA)	Gold	500,000^{‡}
^{‡} Sales+streaming figures based on certification alone.
