= World on Fire (Slash song) =

Single by Slash featuring Myles Kennedy and The Conspirators

from the album World on Fire
- Released: June 16, 2014
- Recorded: 2013
- Genre: Hard rock
- Length: 4:31
- Label: Dik Hayd
- Songwriters: Slash; Myles Kennedy
- Producer: Michael "Elvis" Baskette

Slash featuring Myles Kennedy and The Conspirators singles chronology
"Anastasia" (2013)	"World on Fire" (2014)	"Bent to Fly" (2014)

"World on Fire" is a song by American hard rock guitarist Slash, featuring vocalist Myles Kennedy and backing band The Conspirators. Written by Slash and Kennedy, it is the title track of the guitarist's third solo album (the second with Kennedy and The Conspirators) World on Fire. Released as the album's lead single, "World on Fire" topped the US Billboard Mainstream Rock Songs chart.

== Background and production ==
As is the case with the majority of songs on the album, the origins of "World on Fire" come from a period of writing during touring for the predecessor to World on Fire, 2012's Apocalyptic Love. Two separate ideas written by Slash were introduced to the rest of the band, at which point they were "morphed together" into what became "World on Fire".

The title track was one of the first songs to be developed during the album's pre-production phase in October 2013 at Mates Rehearsal Studio in North Hollywood, Los Angeles, California, along with "Withered Delilah" and "Stone Blind". The basic backing track was completed by the end of the year, recorded at NRG Studios in Los Angeles; the track was finished in March 2014 at producer Mike "Elvis" Baskette's Barbarosa Studios in Orlando, Florida, and mixed and mastered in May at Sterling Sound in New York City.

== Music and lyrics ==
Slash has described "World on Fire" as a "signature song" of the band due to its "tempo and aggression". According to the guitarist, the song is "all about sex", something which influenced the direction vocalist Kennedy took when writing its lyrics. The working title for the song was "I Wanna Pull Your Hair", relating to its sexual nature. Bassist Todd Kerns describes the song as a "barn-burner", praising both the main guitar riff and Kennedy's vocal performance on the track.

Speaking about the lyrical content of "World on Fire", Kennedy explains that "The title track is about seizing the day and living for the moment. Above all, it's about living your life with no regrets. Doing what you want – doing whatever makes you happy. Carpe diem." In a track-by-track interview about the album for Total Guitar magazine, Kennedy noted that the melody for the vocal line "came relatively quickly", but that the theme and content of the lyrics themselves took longer to finalise.

== Release and reception ==
"World on Fire" was first teased in the form of a 30-second clip in early June 2014, before its full radio and internet debut on June 13, followed by a digital single release on June 16. Slash has claimed that the track was set to be the first single released from World on Fire from early on in the album's production process due to its tempo and general style, and that once Kennedy started singing the melodies this was confirmed. The official lyric video for the single, directed by Laban Pheidias, was released the following day. Slash described the video as "a little bit edgy" and explained that for the video he wanted "something specifically dark but specifically fun, and definitely something that you couldn't play on regular TV"; Kennedy described it as "provocative" and "very rock and roll", claiming that it "caught [him] off guard" upon first viewing.

Upon its release, "World on Fire" reached the top of the US Billboard Mainstream Rock Songs, spending 17 weeks on the chart.

== Charts ==
Chart (2014)	Peak position
US Billboard Mainstream Rock Songs	1
US Billboard Hot Rock Songs	43

== Track listing ==
Digital download

1. "World on Fire" – 4:31

== Personnel ==
- Slash – guitars
- Myles Kennedy – lead vocals
- Todd Kerns – bass, backing vocals
- Brent Fitz – drums
