= The Pretty Reckless =

American rock band

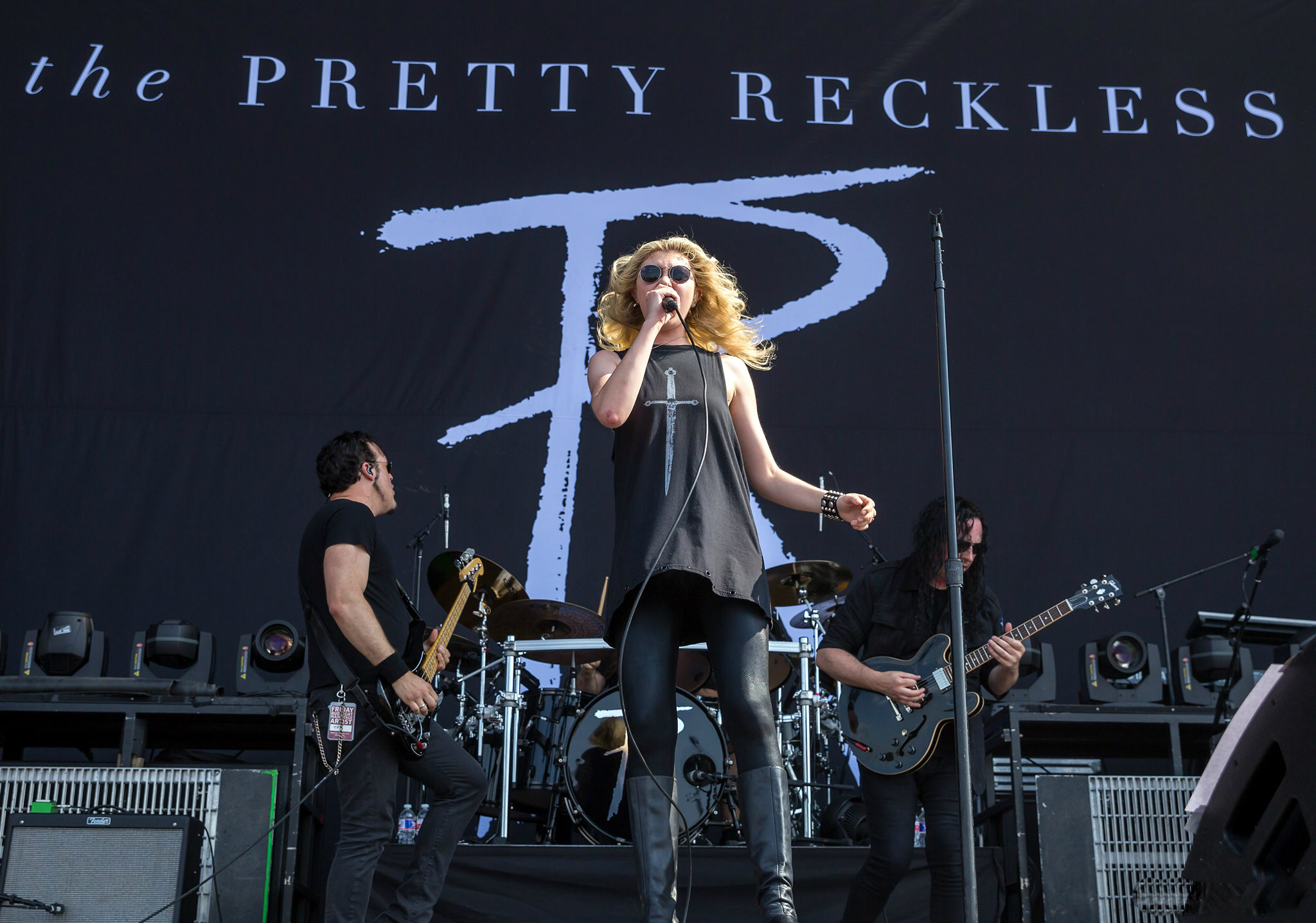
- The Pretty Reckless performing at Rock Fest in 2017

Background information
- Origin: New York City, U.S.
- Genres: Hard rock; alternative rock; post-grunge; blues rock
- Works: The Pretty Reckless discography
- Years active: 2009–present
- Labels: Interscope; Razor & Tie; Cooking Vinyl; Fearless; Century Media
- Members: Taylor Momsen; Ben Phillips; Mark Damon; Jamie Perkins
- Past members: Nick Carbone; Matt Chiarelli; John Secolo
- Website: theprettyreckless.com

The Pretty Reckless is an American rock band from New York City, formed in 2009. The band consists of Taylor Momsen (lead vocals, rhythm guitar), Ben Phillips (lead guitar, backing vocals), Mark Damon (bass), and Jamie Perkins (drums). In August 2010, the band released their debut studio album, Light Me Up. The album spawned three moderately successful singles, most notably "Make Me Wanna Die". The band released the Hit Me Like a Man EP in early 2012. In March 2014, the band released their second studio album, Going to Hell, which included the singles "Heaven Knows" and "Messed Up World (F'd Up World)", both of which topped the US and UK rock charts.

On October 21, 2016, Razor & Tie released the band's third studio album, Who You Selling For. This album spawned the single "Take Me Down", which earned the band their fourth number one on the US rock chart. On February 12, 2021, the band's fourth studio album, Death by Rock and Roll, was released. The band's fifth studio album, Dear God, was released on June 26, 2026. The Pretty Reckless became the first female-fronted band to have seven singles top the Mainstream Rock chart when "Death by Rock and Roll" reached number one.

== History ==
=== 2009–2012: Formation, The Pretty Reckless EP and Light Me Up ===
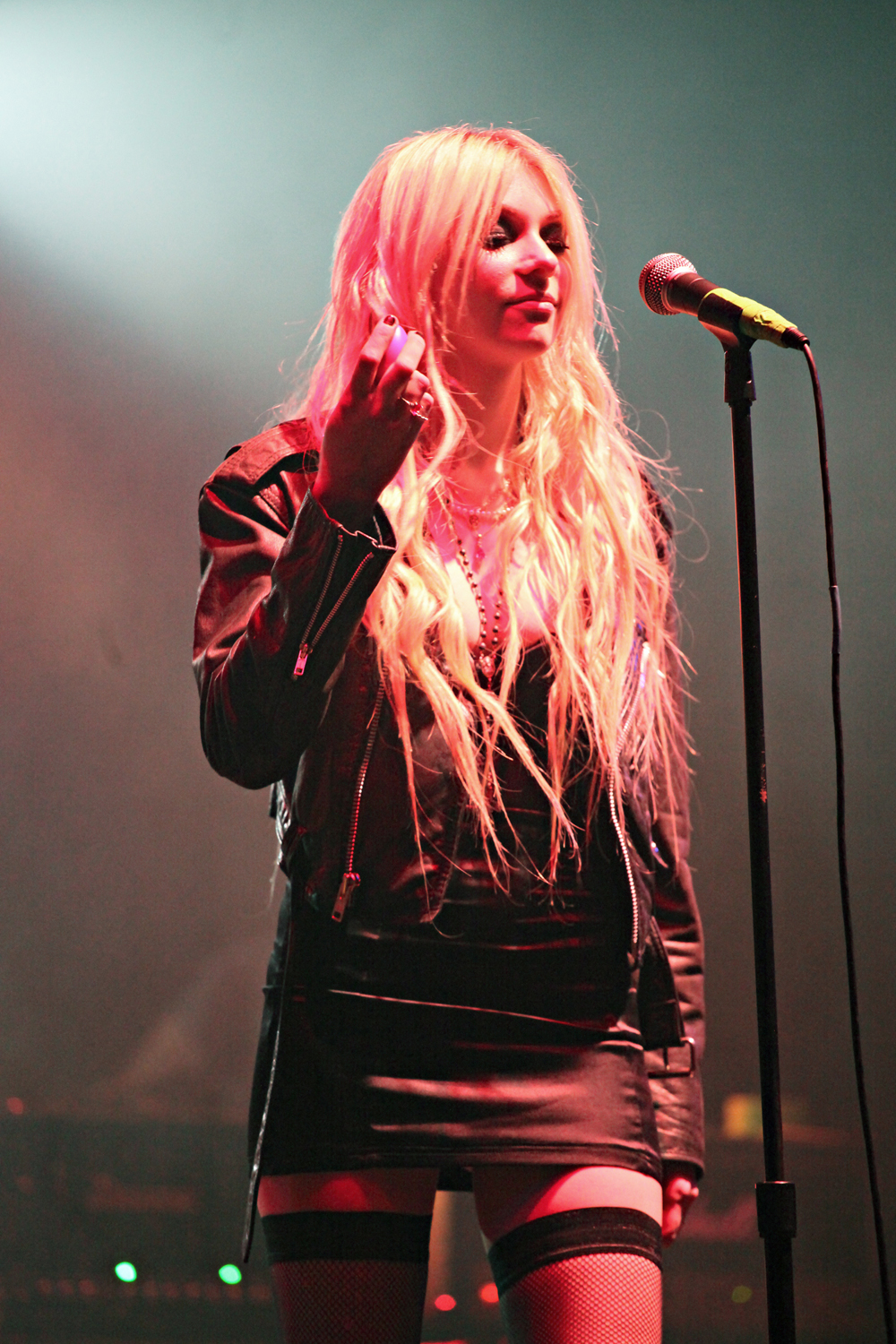
Momsen at the Warped Tour Kickoff (April 2010)

Before forming the band, Taylor Momsen was an actress, best known for How the Grinch Stole Christmas and Gossip Girl. The band were originally called the Reckless, but changed the name due to trademark problems. The band played its first concert on May 5, 2009, at the Annex in New York. The original lineup of the band consisted of Momsen with John Secolo (guitar), Matt Chiarelli (bass), and Nick Carbone (drums). They recorded some demos in early 2009 and opened for the Veronicas on their North American tour. For two years, Momsen worked with several producers before meeting Kato Khandwala. Momsen has said that she liked Khandwala because he was a rock producer as opposed to a pop producer. Khandwala introduced Momsen to Ben Phillips, and the three began to write songs. At present, Momsen is the lead vocalist and rhythm guitarist, with Ben Phillips on lead guitar, Jamie Perkins on drums, and Mark Damon on bass.

Momsen stated in an interview with OK! magazine that the band signed with Interscope Records and would release their debut album in 2010. After the band announced they had signed to Interscope Records, two new recordings of demo songs ("He Loves You" and "Zombie") were posted on their Myspace account.

On December 30, 2009, the band released a new promo song entitled "Make Me Wanna Die". The song was a limited-time free download for fans on their Interscope Records website. It also appeared on the soundtrack of the 2010 film Kick-Ass, playing over the closing credits. The song was the band's first single, released on May 17, 2010, with the debut album set to be released in August. They performed at the Bamboozle music festival on May 1, 2010. The band played Warped Tour 2010.

Their first EP was released on June 22, 2010, to mixed reactions. Rolling Stone magazine classified the sound as "generic". It contained four songs, three of which can be found on their debut album: "Make Me Wanna Die", "My Medicine", and "Goin' Down". "Make Me Wanna Die" was released on April 14, 2010 as the lead single from Light Me Up. A viral video was released to promote the single. The full record was released on August 31, 2010. "Miss Nothing" was released on the second single on August 18, 2010. A video for "Miss Nothing" was released on July 20, 2010. In August 2010, the band performed at the V Festival in the UK. The band embarked on a four-date UK tour starting in Glasgow, Scotland at the Barrowland Ballroom on December 13, 2010, supported by Francesqa.

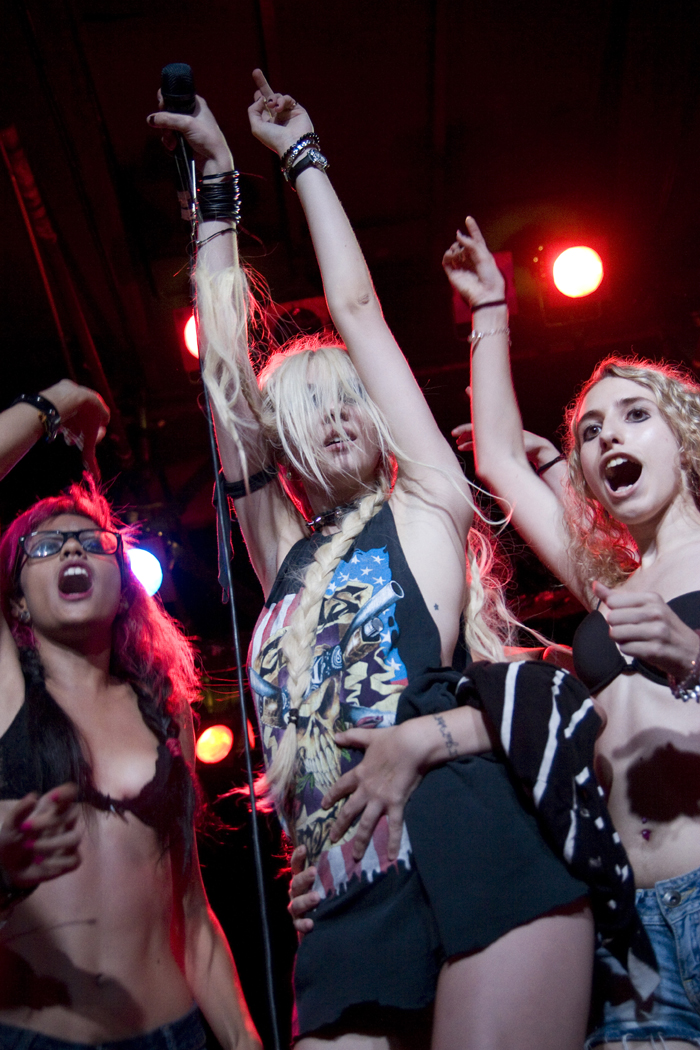
Momsen (July 2011).

In 2011, the band announced a tour running from early February to late March. The band appeared at the Download Festival in June. A planned performance at the Soundwave Revolution, an Australian music festival, was cancelled. During the summer, the band performed in several European festivals such as Rock Am Ring in June, Optimus Alive! on July 8 in Portugal, Rock Werchter on July 2 in Belgium, Wireless Festival on July 3, and T in the Park on July 10 in Scotland. On August 6, 2011, the band performed at the 2011 Lollapalooza festival in Chicago, Illinois. On October 26, 2011, the band performed at Ritual nightclub in Ottawa, Ontario, with guests Static Revolt and the Escape Mode.

The Pretty Reckless opened several Evanescence shows in October. Taylor Momsen stated she was a "big fan of Evanescence, so it's really exciting to be opening for them". The band opened for Evanescence at the historic Hollywood Palladium in Los Angeles. Evanescence singer Amy Lee told MTV News about Momsen: "She's got a great voice; she's real sweet", and laughingly said that being one of Momsen's first concerts makes her feel "old, but very, very flattered." Guns N' Roses' Chinese Democracy Tour confirmed the Pretty Reckless as an opening act for three tour dates in November 2011.

In 2012, two singles were released from the album: "You" and "My Medicine". Videos for both singles were also released: "You" featuring Momsen in a small empty apartment playing the guitar, and "My Medicine" featuring Momsen at an out-of-control party as she sings about being under the influence of alcohol and drugs. Later in 2012, she appeared in a video completely naked. In the video entitled "The Words - Under The Water", Momsen appeared in a black-and-white film while saying the lyrics like reciting a poem. By the time the video ends, Momsen appears without her clothes on, although her private parts are blurred.

=== 2012–2014: Hit Me Like a Man EP, commercial success with Going to Hell ===
The Medicine Tour was the second headlining concert tour by the Pretty Reckless in support of their 2010 debut album Light Me Up and their 2012 extended play Hit Me Like a Man EP. The tour dates were announced on January 23, 2012, via the band's official website. The band performed at several of the same venues they had visited the previous year, with 52 shows in North America, 5 shows in South America and 2 shows in Asia. Directly following those tour dates, the Pretty Reckless supported Marilyn Manson on their tour, Hey Cruel World... Tour. On July 29, the band performed a show in Buenos Aires. In September 2012, the Pretty Reckless headlined the Bazooka Rocks Festival in Manila, Philippines, ending their the Medicine Tour.

Their second extended play Hit Me Like a Man EP was released on March 6, 2012. It featured three new songs, as well as live performances of two songs from Light Me Up. A new song by the band titled "Only You" was included as a bonus track of Frankenweenie Unleashed!, the soundtrack album of Frankenweenie (2012). On December 11, 2012, the Pretty Reckless' released the single, "Kill Me". The song was featured at the end of the final episode of the series Gossip Girl.

On May 30, 2013, the Pretty Reckless released a teaser trailer for their second studio album Going to Hell, set for release later that year. On June 17, 2013, the Pretty Reckless released a new track titled "Follow Me Down". On July 1, 2013, Momsen released the song "Burn", which will also be on Going to Hell.

The song "Going to Hell" premiered on September 19, 2013. On the same day as the premier of the new track "Going to Hell", the Pretty Reckless also announced their signing to the label Razor & Tie. On September 20, 2013, the Pretty Reckless began the Going to Hell Tour to support the album, together with Heaven's Basement. The "Going to Hell" official music video was released on October 16, 2013. ON November 19, 2013, the second single "Heaven Knows" was released. The music video appeared on February 13, 2014.

Going to Hell was released on March 18, 2014. The release marked the band's largest sales week to date and landed at number five on the Billboard 200 with over 35,000 copies sold in its first week. Much of the inspiration for the album came from Momsen's Catholic background, noting that "heaven and hell is a metaphor that's been used in music since the beginning of time".

When the singles "Heaven Knows" and "Messed Up World (F'd Up World)" topped the US Mainstream Rock chart, the Pretty Reckless became the second female-fronted band to achieve two number ones in a row on the chart, following the Pretenders. 2014 also saw Momsen performing at the Revolver Magazine Golden Gods awards alongside Joan Jett and ZZ Top guitarist Billy Gibbons. The band also performed "Heaven Knows", "Fucked Up World", and "Going to Hell" at the awards show.

=== 2015–2017: Who You Selling For ===
Writing for the band's third album began shortly after the completion of two years of touring in support of the band's second studio album, Going to Hell (2014).

"We had so much we wanted to say, it was like shaking a can of soda on tour, and then when we started writing we cracked the seal", Momsen said. "The touring life is very isolating. You look at the world through a bus or airplane window. But music is the healing factor. It's the one thing that is grounding and a true companion through the forest. It saved us—again."

The band released "Take Me Down" as the lead single for their third studio album on July 15, 2016. It became the band's fourth single to top the Mainstream Rock chart and was serviced to US active rock radio on July 19. The music video for "Take Me Down" was released on September 29, 2016. The band's third studio album, Who You Selling For, was released on October 21, 2016, by Razor & Tie.

The band's Who You Selling For Tour started in October 3, 2016 with a show in Paris, France, followed by Berlin, Germany on October 6 and London, England on October 10. The band then played various shows in North America from October 20 to December 6, 2016. The official music video for the album's second single "Oh My God" was released on February 8, 2017. During the tour, on May 17, 2017, the band was the opening act for Soundgarden during lead vocalist Chris Cornell's last performance, at the Fox Theater in Detroit, Michigan, before his suicide. The Pretty Reckless paid tribute to Cornell by performing a cover version of Audioslave's "Like a Stone" on May 20 at the Philadelphia radio station WMMR's annual MMR-B-Q at BB&T Pavilion in Camden, New Jersey. A third single, "Back to the River", featuring Warren Haynes of Gov't Mule and the Allman Brothers Band was released on June 13, 2017.

=== 2018–2024: Death by Rock and Roll and Other Worlds ===
The band's longtime-producer, Kato Khandwala, was involved in a motorcycle accident in April 2018 and died later due to injuries from the crash. Speaking about Khandwala's death, Taylor Momsen stated:

"That was the nail in the coffin for me. I threw my hands up in the air and kind of went 'Yeah, I give up.' I went down a very dark rabbit hole of depression and substance abuse and everything that comes with that."

In November 2019, Momsen revealed on Instagram that the band was working on their fourth studio album with Matt Cameron of Pearl Jam and Soundgarden. In February 2020, Momsen confirmed the album's completion and revealed its title, Death by Rock and Roll. The lead single, which is the title track of the album, was released on May 15, 2020. The band's tour was set to begin in September 2020, having been delayed from May 2020 due to the COVID-19 pandemic. In May 2020, the band signed with Fearless Records.

The Pretty Reckless became the first female-fronted band to have five singles reach the top of the Mainstream Rock chart when "Death by Rock and Roll" rose to its top spot. The Halloween-themed "Broomsticks" was released in late October, and "25" was released on November 13. On January 8, 2021, the band released "And So It Went" featuring Tom Morello as the next single for Death by Rock and Roll. Momsen stated that the song comments on the world's current "civil unrest": "The world has been in such a state of civil unrest. 'And So It Went' basically comes from that vision. As a songwriter, I feel like I'm not here to preach. I use music to observe and communicate what I see around me." The album was released on February 12, 2021.

The band returned to touring for the first time since the Who You Selling For Tour when they joined Shinedown on their Revolutions Live Tour. The tour started on April 1 in Spokane, Washington and wrapped up on May 7, 2022, in Knoxville, Tennessee. In March 2022, it was announced that the band would be joining Halestorm for a summer tour. The tour began on July 8 and concluded on August 12, 2022. On July 15, 2022, the band performed at Rock Fest in Cadott, Wisconsin. The tour visited the UK and Ireland in October and November 2022. In August 2022, the band announced the release of Other Worlds, a compilation album containing alternate versions of previously released songs and new covers, for November 4 that year. A remix of "Got So High" from Death by Rock and Roll was released as a single ahead of the compilation's release. In May 2023, the band announced that they entered the studio to work on their fifth studio album.

Just as the Pretty Reckless started recording their next album, they delayed it to tour as the opening act of AC/DC's Power Up Tour from May 2024 to September 2026, aside from late 2025 concerts in Australia.

=== 2025–present: Dear God ===
On July 28, 2025, it was announced that the band will be featured on a tribute album for the band, Bad Company. Titled Can't Get Enough: A Tribute To Bad Company, it was released on October 24, 2025, with the band performing on the song "All Right Now". On August 22, 2025, the band released their first new song in four years, "For I Am Death", alongside an accompanying music video. On October 10, 2025, the band announced a Christmas EP titled, Taylor Momsen's Pretty Reckless Christmas, with a release date of October 31 for digital, and November 14 for physical copies. Along with the announcement, the band released a reimagining of "Where Are You Christmas?". The song was originally performed by Momsen when she portrayed Cindy Lou Who in the 2000 film How The Grinch Stole Christmas. On March 13, 2026, the band released the single, "When I Wake Up". On the same day, they also announced their fifth studio album, Dear God, which was released on June 26, 2026. A music video for the song was released five days later. The album's third single, "Love Me", was released on April 17, 2026. The album's fourth single, "Dear God", was released on May 22, 2026. A music video for the title track was released on June 29. In 2026, the addition of touring guitarist Logan Nikolic was confirmed. On October 19, 2026, the band released a new version and video for the song "About You" featuring Dave Grohl and Pat Smear of Foo Fighters.

== Musical style and influences ==
The Pretty Reckless has been described as hard rock, alternative rock, post-grunge, blues rock, and grunge. According to Louder Sound, "[the band mixes] the finer elements of heavy metal with grunge and blues. Ben Phillips' gritty riffs gave Momsen a platform to make singles Miss Nothing and Make Me Wanna Die teem with attitude, while the softer moments, such as Just Tonight, set up the singer...as a vocal force to be reckoned with. BBC described the band as "grunge-pop". Ultimate Guitar noted elements of psychedelia, blues, folk, and Southern rock on their third album, Who You Selling For. The band's fourth album, Death by Rock and Roll, had touches of country rock, folk rock, and Americana, on the tracks, "Rock and Roll Heaven" and "Harley Darling", along with their typical hard rock sound.

In interviews, Momsen reported the influences on the band to include Chris Cornell, Soundgarden, Audioslave, Hole, the Beatles, the Doors, Led Zeppelin, Bob Dylan, David Bowie, Kurt Cobain, Alanis Morissette, Pink Floyd, Guns N' Roses, the Who, Oasis, Robert Plant, Joan Jett, Nirvana, and Neil Young.

== Band members ==
The Pretty Reckless live at Rock im Park 2014

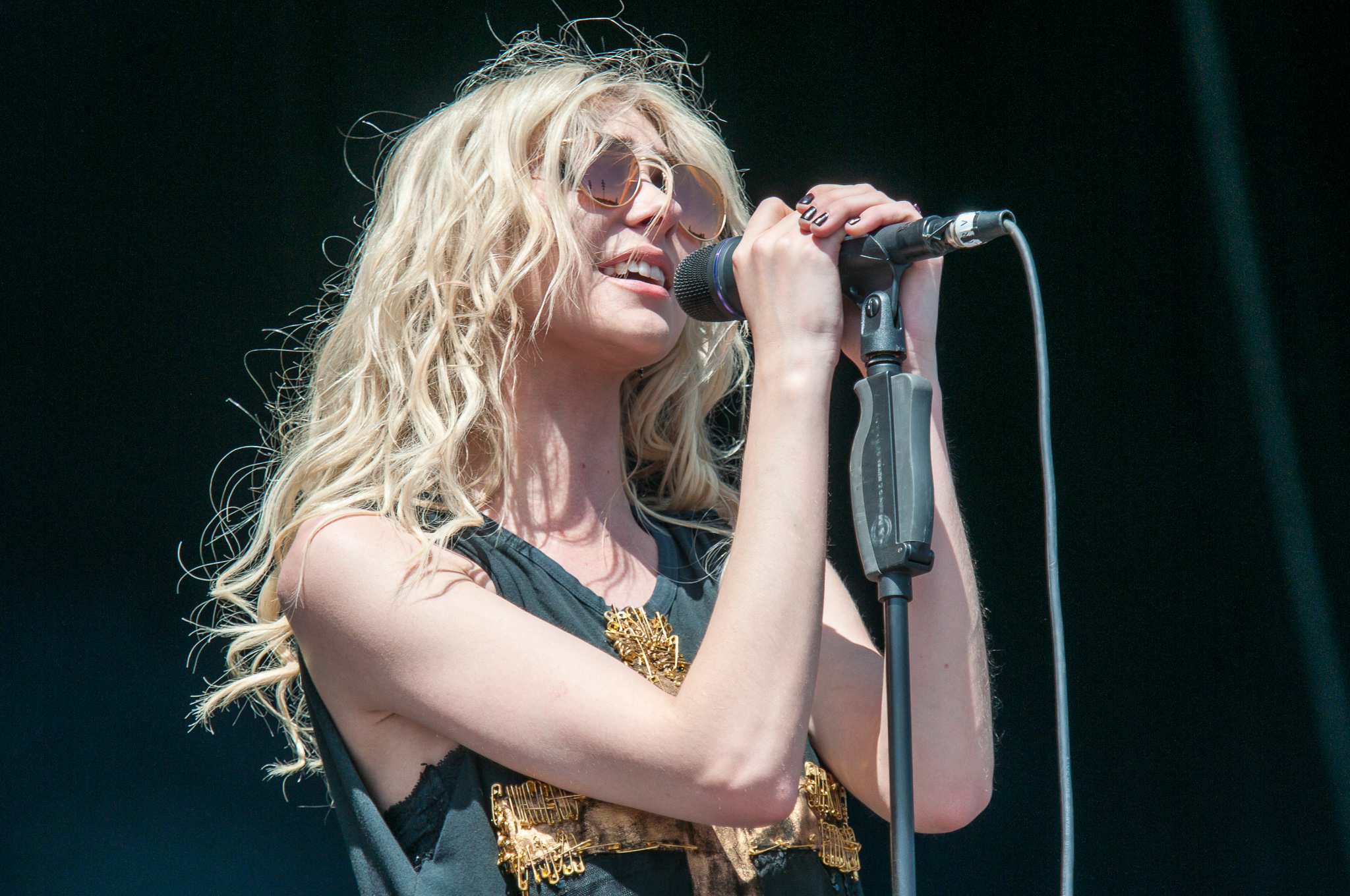
Taylor Momsen

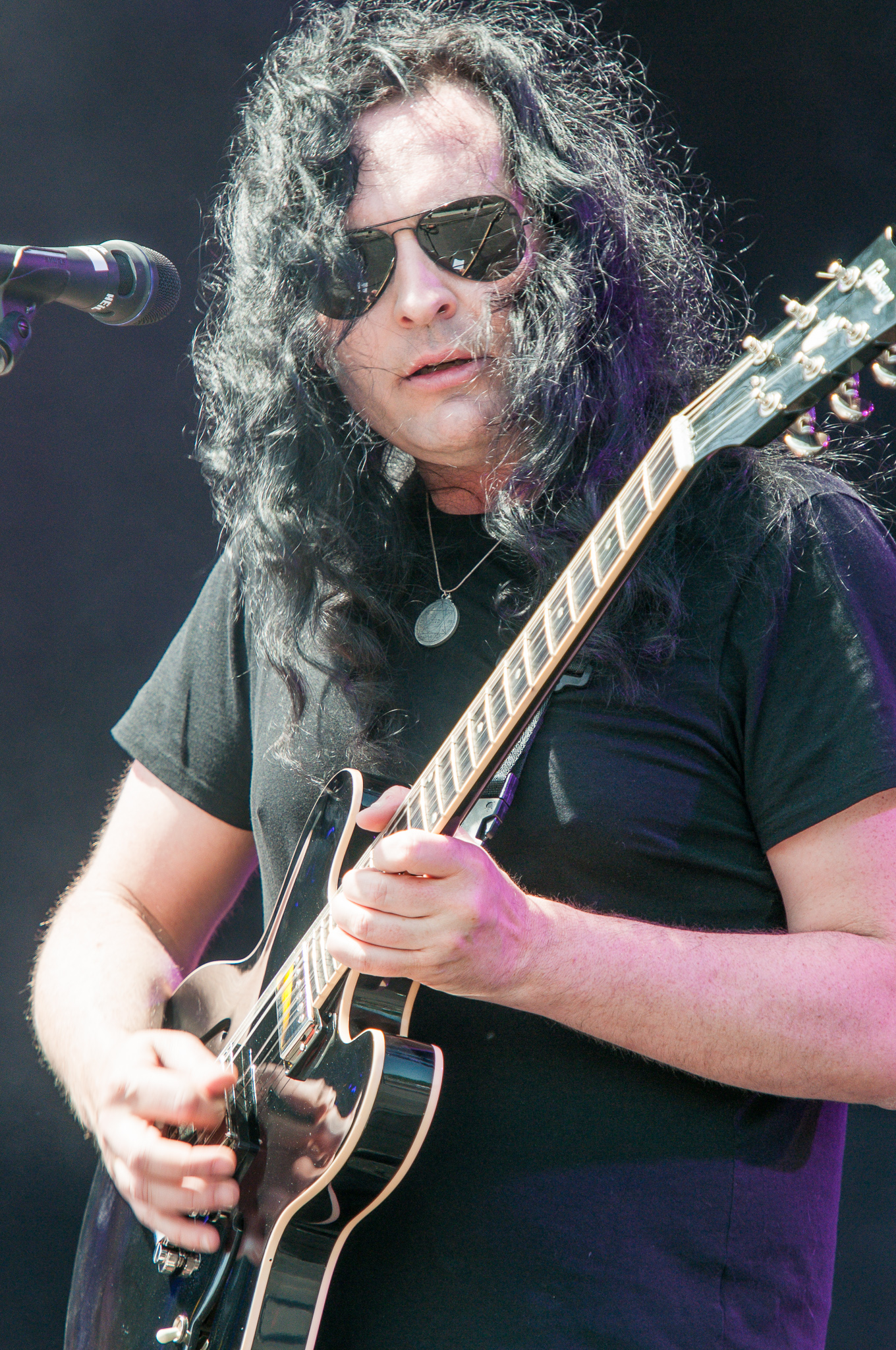
Ben Phillips

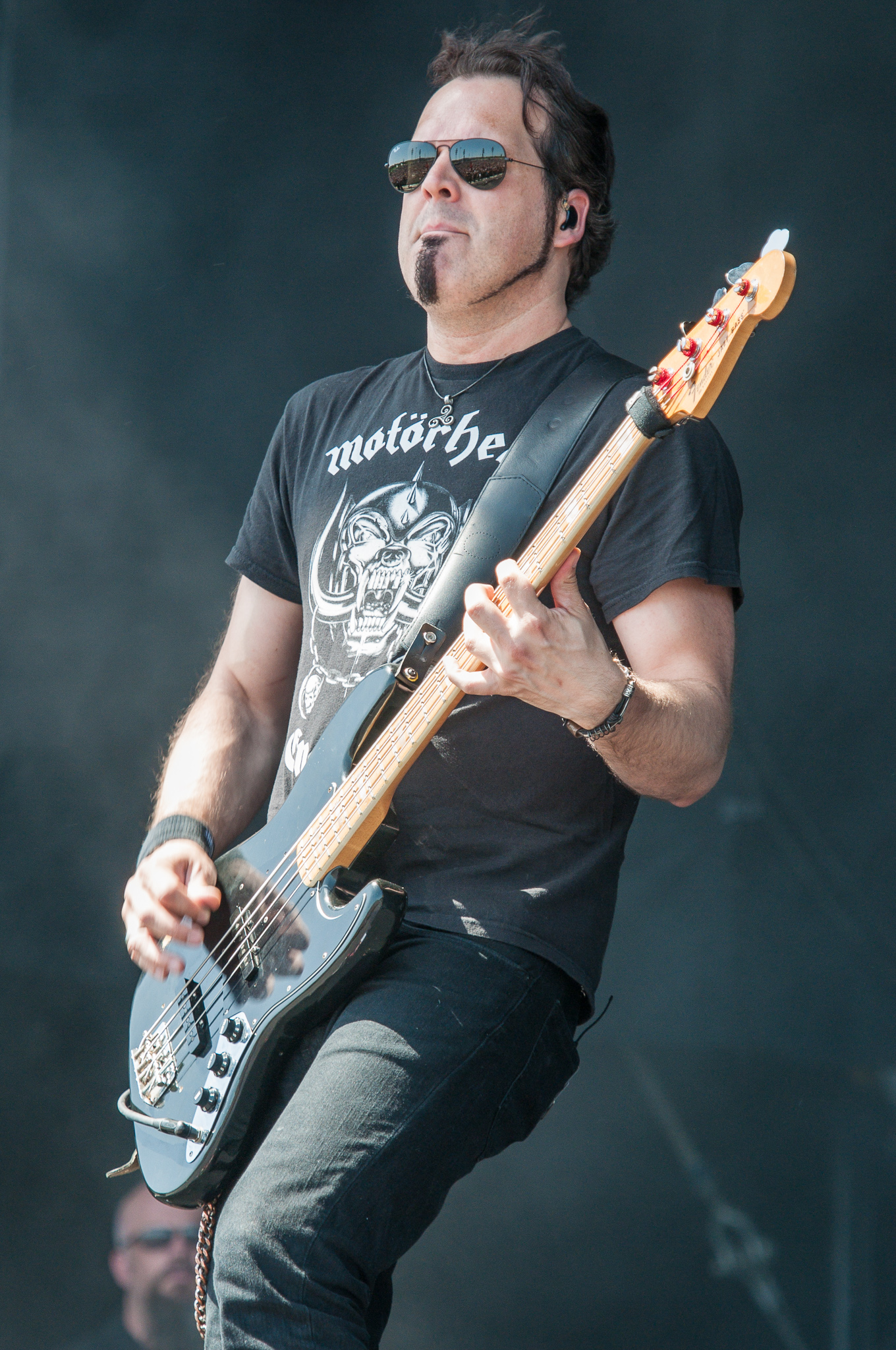
Mark Damon

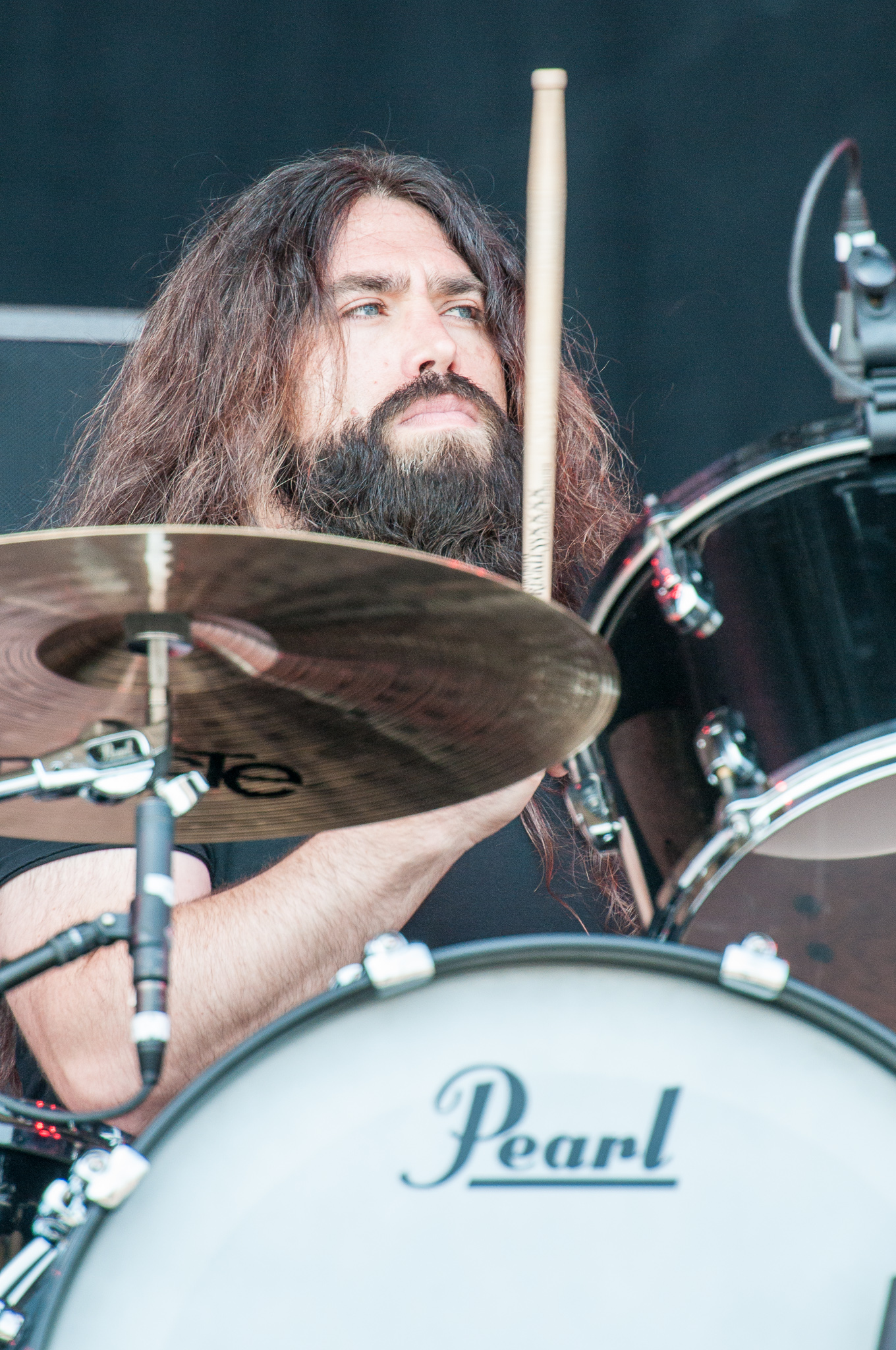
Jamie Perkins

Current members

- Taylor Momsen – lead vocals, rhythm guitar (2009–present)
- Ben Phillips – lead guitar, backing vocals (2010–present)
- Mark Damon – bass (2010–present)
- Jamie Perkins – drums (2010–present)

Former members

- Nick Carbone – drums (2009–2010)
- Matt Chiarelli – bass (2009–2010)
- John Secolo – lead guitar (2009–2010)

Touring musicians

- Logan Nikolic – guitar (2025–present)

== Discography ==
Studio albums

- Light Me Up (2010)
- Going to Hell (2014)
- Who You Selling For (2016)
- Death by Rock and Roll (2021)
- Dear God (2026)

== Tours ==
Headlining

- Light Me Up Tour (2010–2012)
- The Medicine Tour (2012)
- Going to Hell Tour (2013–2015)
- Who You Selling For Tour (2016–2017)
- Death by Rock and Roll Tour (2022–2023)
- Dear God Tour (2026)

Festivals

- Part of Warped Tour (2010)
- Rock Fest (2022)
- Part of Rock The Rock Fest (2023)

Supporting act

- Chinese Democracy Tour by Guns N' Roses (2011)
- Power Up Tour by AC/DC (2024–2026)

== Awards and nominations ==
Year	Ceremony	Category	Work	Result	Reference
2010	Virgin Media Music Award	Best Group	—N/a	Nominated	
2010	Virgin Media Music Award	Best Newcomer	—N/a	Nominated	
2014	Independent Music Awards	Best 'Difficult' Second Album	Going to Hell	Nominated	
2014	Kerrang Awards	Hottest Female	Taylor Momsen	Won	
2014	RadioContraband Awards	New Artist of the Year	—N/a	Won	
2017	Alternative Press Music Awards	Best Hard Rock Band	—N/a	Won	
2017	Alternative Press Music Awards	Artist of the Year	—N/a	Nominated	
2017	Loudwire Music Awards	Hard Rock Artist of the Year	—N/a	Nominated	
2017	iHeartRadio Music Awards	Rock Song of the Year	"Take Me Down"	Nominated	
2021	iHeartRadio Music Awards	Rock Artist of the Year	—N/a	Won	
2021	iHeartRadio Music Awards	Rock Song of the Year	"Death by Rock And Roll"	Nominated	
2021	Teraz Rock Awards	Best Foreign Album of the Year	Death by Rock and Roll	Nominated	
2022	iHeartRadio Music Awards	Rock Artist of the Year	—N/a	Nominated	
2022	iHeartRadio Music Awards	Rock Song of the Year	"And So It Went"	Nominated	
