= Going to Hell =

2014 studio album by the Pretty Reckless

Studio album by the Pretty Reckless
- Released: March 12, 2014
- Recorded: 2012–2013
- Studio: Water Music (Hoboken, New Jersey)
- Genre: Hard rock
- Length: 45:16
- Label: Razor & Tie
- Producer: Kato Khandwala

The Pretty Reckless chronology
Hit Me Like a Man EP (2012)	Going to Hell (2014)	Who You Selling For (2016)

Alternative cover
- Japanese deluxe edition cover

Singles from Going to Hell
- 1. "Going to Hell" Released: September 24, 2013; 2. "Heaven Knows" Released: November 19, 2013; 3. "Messed Up World (F'd Up World)" Released: April 22, 2014; 4. "House on a Hill" Released: September 28, 2014; 5. "Follow Me Down" Released: November 18, 2014

Going to Hell is the second studio album by the American rock band the Pretty Reckless, released on March 12, 2014, by Razor & Tie. The album debuted at number five on the Billboard 200 with 35,000 copies sold in its first week, becoming the band's first top-10 album on the chart. Going to Hell spawned five singles, including "Heaven Knows", "Messed Up World (F'd Up World)", and "Follow Me Down", all three of which reached number one on Billboard's Mainstream Rock Songs chart.

== Background and recording ==
The band had been recording at Water Music Recording Studios in Hoboken, New Jersey, when the studio was destroyed by Hurricane Sandy in October 2012. After losing a lot of equipment and recordings of songs meant for Going to Hell, they had to re-record a lot of songs they had been working on at the time.

It was confirmed in September 2013 that the Pretty Reckless had parted ways with Interscope Records, followed by the announcement that the band had signed with the Razor & Tie label. In October 2013, it was announced that the band had signed with Cooking Vinyl in Australia.

== Release and promotion ==
On May 30, 2013, the band released a teaser trailer for their second studio album, and premiered a lyric video for the track "Follow Me Down" on June 17, 2013, while the song "Burn" premiered on July 1. The title track "Going to Hell" premiered on Revolver magazine's website on September 19, 2013, and was officially released as the album's first single on September 24. In support of the album, the band embarked on the Going to Hell Tour on September 20, 2013, featuring Heaven's Basement and Louna as opening acts.

The music video for "Going to Hell" premiered on October 16, 2013, while "Heaven Knows" was released on November 19 as the second single from Going to Hell, after premiering on Sirius XM's Octane. The music video for "Heaven Knows" debuted on February 13, 2014. The song peaked at number one on Billboard's Mainstream Rock Songs chart, making the Pretty Reckless the second act with a female vocalist to top the chart since 1990, when Alannah Myles' "Black Velvet" reached number two for two weeks.

The track listing, album cover, and release date were announced on January 21, 2014, and a number of limited pre-order bundles were made available on the band's website. The cover art depicts lead singer Taylor Momsen naked from behind, her back decorated with a black cross and arrow pointing to her buttocks. Momsen stated the cover image was inspired by Pink Floyd. "You know that photograph of the women sitting by a pool, nude, with all the record covers painted on their backs? That's one of my favorite posters, so I stole the idea", she told Rolling Stone.

"Fucked Up World" was released on April 22, 2014, as the album's third single, under the title "Messed Up World (F'd Up World)". The music video was filmed in Miami on April 30, and premiered on June 17 on the band's Vevo page. When the single topped the Mainstream Rock Songs chart, the Pretty Reckless became the second female-fronted band to achieve two number-one songs in a row on the chart, following the Pretenders. "House on a Hill" was released on September 28, 2014 as the fourth single from the album. The album's fifth and final single, "Follow Me Down", impacted US active rock radio on November 18, 2014. The song earned the band their third consecutive number one on the Mainstream Rock Songs chart, tying Halestorm for the most number ones by a female-fronted band since the chart launched in 1981.

== Critical reception ==
Professional ratings
Aggregate scores
Source	Rating
Metacritic	58/100
Review scores
Source	Rating
AllMusic	4/5 stars
Alternative Press	1/5 stars
Blabbermouth.net	8/10
Kerrang!	KKKK
Q	2/5 stars
Rolling Stone	3/5 stars
Sputnikmusic	3.2/5

Going to Hell received mixed to positive reviews from music critics. At Metacritic, which assigns a weighted mean rating out of 100 to reviews from critics, the album received an average score of 58, based on six reviews, which indicates "mixed or average reviews". AllMusic's Stephen Thomas Erlewine found Going to Hell to be "way better" than the band's debut album, Light Me Up, while noticing "a twitchy teen rebellion that fuels the whole enterprise, and that's why Going to Hell works: the group may be following a blueprint, but they believe they're following their own course, and that conviction is convincing."

George Garner of Kerrang! opined that "[t]he title track's a good indication of the album as a whole—it's a bit rawer, significantly darker and a lot more Momsenier", concluding, "If Taylor is indeed going to Hell, at least she's released a truly great album on the way down." Jon Wiederhorn of Revolver stated, "She may still be a dirty girl, but Momsen leaves most chick rockers in her rearview mirror thanks to her greatest assets—her daring arrangements and well-crafted tunes." Rolling Stone's Chuck Eddy wrote, "This New York band's brash second album rages with the upbeat, beat-wise humor that hard rock has suppressed ever since grunge."

Ray Van Horn Jr. of Blabbermouth.net described the album as "a fierce and entertaining record" and "a shell-shocked, stripped-down form of modern rock 'n roll that sounds at times like Heart in their early years and even their most recent few albums." Davey Boy of Sputnikmusic noted that "'Absolution', 'Fucked Up World' and 'House on a Hill' best showcase [Momsen's] dynamic vocal range, but while concentrating a little too much on her Lolita-like image doesn't blunt the strength of Momsen's voice per se, a by-product is that the tunes rarely capitalize on her understated vulnerability." Boy further commented that "The Pretty Reckless don't do a great deal to prove the cynics wrong here. More frustratingly, they are undoubtedly capable of much better." In a mixed assessment of the album, Q expressed that "[b]latant Queen rip-off 'Heaven Knows' is fun, but it all goes wrong when she breaks out ballads." Bree Davies of Alternative Press panned the album, stating that the band "seems to have tried too hard to come across as outrageous. It's got every contrived reference possible along with clips of brainwashing television sermons and sound bites recreated from cheap porn."

The album was placed at number 12 on Revolver's list of "The 20 Best Albums of 2014".

== Commercial performance ==
Going to Hell debuted at number five on the Billboard 200 with first-week sales of 35,000 copies, earning the band their first top-10 album and biggest sales week yet. As of October 2016, the album had sold 225,000 copies in the United States. The album entered the UK Albums Chart at number eight, selling 9,693 copies in its first week. In Japan, it debuted at number 50 on the Oricon Weekly Albums Chart with 1,795 copies sold. On March 17, 2016, the album was certified gold by Music Canada, denoting shipments in excess of 40,000 copies.

== Track listing ==
All tracks are written by Taylor Momsen and Ben Phillips, except where noted.

Standard edition
No.	Title	Length
1.	"Follow Me Down" (Momsen)	4:40
2.	"Going to Hell"	4:36
3.	"Heaven Knows"	3:44
4.	"House on a Hill"	4:39
5.	"Sweet Things"	5:04
6.	"Dear Sister" (Momsen)	0:56
7.	"Absolution"	4:34
8.	"Blame Me" (Momsen)	4:27
9.	"Burn" (Momsen)	1:48
10.	"Why'd You Bring a Shotgun to the Party"	3:20
11.	"Fucked Up World"	4:16
12.	"Waiting for a Friend" (Momsen)	3:12
Total length:		45:16

Deluxe and limited edition (bonus tracks) / US and Canadian iTunes Store edition (bonus tracks)
No.	Title	Length
13.	"Going to Hell" (live acoustic)	2:35
14.	"Sweet Things" (acoustic)	4:14
Total length:		52:05

International iTunes Store deluxe edition (bonus track)
No.	Title	Length
15.	"Only You" (Momsen, Phillips, Kato Khandwala)	3:38
Total length:		55:43

Japanese edition (bonus tracks)
No.	Title	Length
13.	"Kill Me" (Momsen, Phillips, Khandwala)	3:47
14.	"Going to Hell" (live acoustic)	2:35
15.	"Sweet Things" (acoustic)	4:14
Total length:		55:52

Japanese deluxe edition (bonus tracks)
No.	Title	Length
16.	"Messed Up World (F'd Up World)"	4:15
17.	"Going to Hell" (radio edit)	3:40
Total length:		63:47

Japanese deluxe edition (bonus DVD)
No.	Title	Length
1.	"Going to Hell" (music video)	4:23
2.	"Heaven Knows" (music video)	3:46
3.	"Messed Up World (F'd Up World)" (music video)	4:16
Total length:		12:25

== Personnel ==
Credits adapted from the liner notes of Going to Hell.

=== The Pretty Reckless ===
- Taylor Momsen – lead vocals
- Ben Phillips – guitars, backing vocals
- Mark Damon – bass
- Jamie Perkins – drums

=== Additional personnel ===
- Kato Khandwala – production, mixing
- Ted Jensen – mastering
- Jenna Haze – additional vocals on "Follow Me Down"
- Bronxville Union Free School District – additional vocals on "Heaven Knows"
- Jeremy Gillespie – harmonica on "Waiting for a Friend"
- Adam Larson – art direction
- Daniel Hastings – photography

== Charts ==
=== Weekly charts ===
Weekly chart performance for Going to Hell
Chart (2014)	Peak position
Australian Albums (ARIA)	20
Austrian Albums (Ö3 Austria)	28
Belgian Albums (Ultratop Flanders)	57
Belgian Albums (Ultratop Wallonia)	28
Canadian Albums (Billboard)	5
Danish Albums (Hitlisten)	33
Dutch Albums (Album Top 100)	58
French Albums (SNEP)	46
German Albums (Offizielle Top 100)	35
Irish Albums (IRMA)	45
Irish Independent Albums (IRMA)	10
Japanese Albums (Oricon)	50
New Zealand Albums (RMNZ)	19
Scottish Albums (Official Charts)	7
Spanish Albums (Promusicae)	68
Swiss Albums (Schweizer Hitparade)	35
UK Albums (Official Charts)	8
UK Independent Albums (Official Charts)	1
UK Rock & Metal Albums (Official Charts)	1
US Billboard 200	5
US Top Alternative Albums (Billboard)	2
US Top Hard Rock Albums (Billboard)	1
US Top Rock Albums (Billboard)	2

=== Year-end charts ===
2014 year-end chart performance for Going to Hell
Chart (2014)	Position
US Billboard 200	181
US Top Alternative Albums (Billboard)	32
US Top Hard Rock Albums (Billboard)	10
US Top Rock Albums (Billboard)	43

2015 year-end chart performance for Going to Hell
Chart (2015)	Position
US Top Hard Rock Albums (Billboard)	21

== Certifications ==
Certifications for Going to Hell
Region	Certification	Certified units/sales
Canada (Music Canada)	Gold	40,000^{^}
United Kingdom (BPI)	Silver	60,000^{‡}
^{^} Shipments figures based on certification alone.^{‡} Sales+streaming figures based on certification alone.

== Release history ==
Release dates and formats for Going to Hell
Region	Date	Format	Edition	Label	Ref(s)
Japan	March 12, 2014	CD; digital download	Standard	Victor Entertainment	
Germany	March 14, 2014	CD; digital download	Standard; deluxe	Cooking Vinyl	
Germany	March 14, 2014	LP	Standard	Cooking Vinyl	
United Kingdom	March 16, 2014	Digital download	Standard; deluxe	Cooking Vinyl	
France	March 17, 2014	CD	Standard	Cooking Vinyl	
France	March 17, 2014	Digital download	Standard; deluxe	Cooking Vinyl	
United Kingdom	March 17, 2014	CD	Standard; deluxe	Cooking Vinyl	
United Kingdom	March 17, 2014	LP	Standard	Cooking Vinyl	
Canada	March 18, 2014	CD	Limited	Universal	
Canada	March 18, 2014	LP	Standard	Universal	
Canada	March 18, 2014	Digital download	Deluxe	Universal	
United States	March 18, 2014	CD	Limited	Razor & Tie	
United States	March 18, 2014	LP	Standard	Razor & Tie	
United States	March 18, 2014	Digital download	Deluxe	Razor & Tie	
Australia	March 21, 2014	CD; digital download	Standard; deluxe	Cooking Vinyl	
Japan	November 19, 2014	CD + DVD	Deluxe	Victor Entertainment	
