= Follow Me Down (The Pretty Reckless song) =

Single by The Pretty Reckless

from the album Going to Hell
- Released: November 18, 2014
- Genre: Hard rock
- Length: 4:40
- Label: Razor & Tie
- Songwriter: Taylor Momsen
- Producer: Kato Khandwala

The Pretty Reckless singles chronology
"House on a Hill" (2014)	"Follow Me Down" (2014)	"Take Me Down" (2016)

"Follow Me Down" is a song by American rock band The Pretty Reckless from their second studio album, Going to Hell (2014). The song was written by the band's lead singer Taylor Momsen, while production was done by Kato Khandwala. It was serviced to active rock radio in the United States on November 18, 2014, serving as the album's fifth and final single. The track's intro features former pornographic actress Jenna Haze, a close friend of Momsen's, simulating an orgasm, which was removed from the radio edit.

The song topped Billboard's Mainstream Rock Songs chart in May 2015, becoming the band's third consecutive number one on the chart, as well as tying Halestorm for the most number ones by a female-fronted band since the chart launched in 1981.

== Charts ==
=== Weekly charts ===
Chart (2015)	Peak position
Canada Rock (Billboard)	8
US Hot Rock & Alternative Songs (Billboard)	36
US Mainstream Rock (Billboard)	1
US Rock & Alternative Airplay (Billboard)	17

=== Year-end charts ===
Chart (2015)	Position
US Mainstream Rock (Billboard)	3

== Release history ==
Region	Date	Format	Label	Ref.
United States	November 18, 2014	Active rock radio	Razor & Tie	
