= Heaven Knows (The Pretty Reckless song) =

2013 single by the Pretty Reckless

Single by the Pretty Reckless

from the album Going to Hell
- Released: November 19, 2013
- Studio: Water Music (Hoboken, New Jersey)
- Genre: Hard rock
- Length: 3:44
- Label: Razor & Tie
- Songwriters: Taylor Momsen; Ben Phillips
- Producer: Kato Khandwala

The Pretty Reckless singles chronology
"Going to Hell" (2013)	"Heaven Knows" (2013)	"Messed Up World" (2014)

"Heaven Knows" is a song by American rock band the Pretty Reckless from their second studio album, Going to Hell (2014). It was written by Taylor Momsen and Ben Phillips, while Kato Khandwala handled the production. Released on November 19, 2013, as the album's second single, "Heaven Knows" is the band's first single to top a Billboard chart (Mainstream Rock) and their second single to top UK Rock Singles Chart, following their debut single "Make Me Wanna Die" (2010). The song later entered the Alternative Songs chart, peaking at number 20.

== Background ==
Following the end of their worldwide tour The Medicine Tour in 2012, the band began working on their second studio album. They were recording at Water Music Recording Studios in Hoboken, New Jersey, when the studio was destroyed by Hurricane Sandy in October 2012. They lost a lot of equipment and recordings of songs meant for the album and had to do a lot of re-recording. Interscope Records released "Kill Me" to digital retailers on December 2, 2012; it would serve as the album's lead single. However, a conflict with the record company caused the Pretty Reckless to end their deal with Interscope, and on September 24, 2013, it was announced the band had signed on with the label Razor & Tie.

"Heaven Knows" premiered on November 19, 2013, on Sirius XM's Octane, and on the same day, it was released digitally as the album's second single.

== Critical reception ==
Chris Payne of Billboard praised "Heaven Knows" and described it as "Queen's 'We Will Rock You' with Joan Jett vocals". Chucky Eddy of Rolling Stone also praised the song, calling it a "full-on glam [stomp] about troubled teens".

== Commercial performance ==
"Heaven Knows" became the Pretty Reckless' first single to top a Billboard chart. It was their first entry on the Mainstream Rock Songs chart and spent three consecutive weeks at number one, becoming the most successful song of 2014 on the chart. It was the second song by a female-fronted band to top the Mainstream Rock Songs chart in 24 years. After the song's success on US mainstream rock radio stations, it was finally serviced to modern rock radio where it also became the band's first entry on the Alternative Songs chart, peaking at number 20. The song failed to enter the Billboard Hot 100, instead reaching number 14 on the Bubbling Under Hot 100 Singles chart. The song was also the band's first entry on the Canadian Hot 100, peaking at number 48.

The single debuted at number 151 on the UK Singles Chart for the week ending March 1, 2014. It entered the top 100 at number 95 in its third week on the chart, and in its fifth week, it peaked at number 61 with 3,737 copies sold. "Heaven Knows" also became the band's second number-one song on the UK Rock & Metal Singles Chart.

"Heaven Knows" became the band's first song to chart in New Zealand and France, reaching numbers 38 and 158, respectively.

The single was certified platinum in both the United States and Canada, and gold in New Zealand.

== Music video ==
The music video for "Heaven Knows", co-directed by lead vocalist Taylor Momsen and Jon J, was shot on location in Miami, Florida. Momsen stated that the video was deliberately understated, and meant to reflect many issues that people face, including personal, political, or social issues.

The video premiered on Vevo on February 13, 2014. It features a half-naked Momsen in black eye shadow, surrounded by burning books and heavily tattooed teenagers in a dark high school.

== Track listing ==
- Digital download
1. "Heaven Knows" – 3:44

== Charts ==
=== Weekly charts ===
Weekly chart performance for "Heaven Knows"
Chart (2014)	Peak position
Canada Hot 100 (Billboard)	48
Canada Rock (Billboard)	2
France (SNEP)	158
Japan (Japan Hot 100)	64
New Zealand (Recorded Music NZ)	38
Scotland Singles (OCC)	53
UK Singles (OCC)	61
UK Indie (OCC)	6
UK Rock & Metal (OCC)	1
US Bubbling Under Hot 100 (Billboard)	14
US Hot Rock & Alternative Songs (Billboard)	17
US Rock & Alternative Airplay (Billboard)	10

=== Year-end charts ===
Year-end chart performance for "Heaven Knows"
Chart (2014)	Position
US Hot Rock & Alternative Songs (Billboard)	31
US Rock Airplay (Billboard)	17

== Certifications ==
Certifications for "Heaven Knows"
Region	Certification	Certified units/sales
Canada (Music Canada)	Platinum	80,000^{‡}
New Zealand (RMNZ)	Gold	15,000^{‡}
United States (RIAA)	Platinum	1,000,000^{‡}
^{‡} Sales+streaming figures based on certification alone.

== Release history ==
Release dates and formats for "Heaven Knows"
Region	Date	Format	Label	Ref.
United States	November 19, 2013	Digital download	Razor & Tie	
Canada	December 3, 2013	Digital download	Razor & Tie	
Australia	January 17, 2014	Digital download	Cooking Vinyl	
Germany	January 17, 2014	Digital download	Cooking Vinyl	
Ireland	January 17, 2014	Digital download	Cooking Vinyl	
United Kingdom	January 19, 2014	Digital download	Cooking Vinyl	
France	January 20, 2014	Digital download	Cooking Vinyl	

== See also ==
- List of Billboard Mainstream Rock number-one songs of the 2010s
- List of UK Rock & Metal Singles Chart number ones of 2014
