= The Medicine Tour =

2012 concert tour by the Pretty Reckless

- Tour by The Pretty Reckless
- Promotional poster for the tour
- Associated album: Light Me Up; Hit Me Like a Man EP
- Start date: March 9, 2012
- End date: September 30, 2012
- Legs: 3
- No. of shows: 52 in North America; 5 in South America; 2 in Asia; 59 in total

The Pretty Reckless concert chronology
- Light Me Up Tour (2010–12); The Medicine Tour (2012); Going to Hell Tour (2013–15)

The Medicine Tour is the second headlining concert tour by American rock band the Pretty Reckless in support of their debut studio album, Light Me Up (2010), and their second extended play, Hit Me Like a Man EP (2012).

== Background ==
The tour dates were announced on January 23, 2012 via the band's official website. These concerts would be taking place in North America, performing at several of the same venues that the band had visited the previous year.

== Opening acts ==
- The Parlor Mob (March 9 – April 25)
- The Hollywood Kills (selected dates during March 9 – April 25)

== Setlist ==
1. "Hit Me Like a Man"
2. "Since You're Gone"
3. "Zombie"
4. "Miss Nothing"
5. "Just Tonight"
6. "Goin' Down"
7. "Cold Blooded"
8. "Seven Nation Army" (White Stripes cover) (performed on Argentina through July 29, 2012)
9. "Aerials" (System of a Down cover)
10. "My Medicine"
11. "Make Me Wanna Die"
12. "Factory Girl"
  Encore
13. "Nothing Left to Lose"

Notes

- During the band's support shows for Marilyn Manson, the Pretty Reckless performed "Under the Water" before "Factory Girl".
- "Nothing Left to Lose" and the cover of System of a Down's "Aerials" were not performed at support shows for Marilyn Manson.
- "Factory Girl" contains elements of Led Zeppelin's "Bring It On Home" (April 27 – May 2 and May 4–19 dates only)

== Tour dates ==
Date	City	Country	Venue
North America
March 9, 2012	Tucson	United States	Club Congress
March 10, 2012	Scottsdale	United States	Martini Ranch
March 11, 2012	Santa Ana	United States	Constellation Room
March 14, 2012	Los Angeles	United States	House of Blues Hollywood
March 15, 2012	San Francisco	United States	Bottom of the Hill
March 16, 2012	Portland	United States	Hawthorne Theatre
March 17, 2012	Seattle	United States	El Corazon
March 18, 2012	Vancouver	Canada	Rickshaw Theatre
March 20, 2012	Calgary	Canada	The Den
March 22, 2012	Edmonton	Canada	The Starlite Room
March 23, 2012	Saskatoon	Canada	Louis' Pub
March 24, 2012	Regina	Canada	The Exchange
March 26, 2012	Winnipeg	Canada	West End Cultural Centre
March 29, 2012	Chicago	United States	Bottom Lounge
March 30, 2012	Cleveland	United States	House of Blues
March 31, 2012	Columbus	United States	Newport Music Hall
April 1, 2012	Toledo	United States	Frankies Innercity
April 3, 2012	Pontiac	United States	The Crofoot Ballroom
April 4, 2012	Toronto	Canada	Phoenix Concert Theatre
April 6, 2012	Quebec City	Canada	Le Cercle
April 7, 2012	Montreal	Canada	Métropolis
April 8, 2012	South Burlington	United States	Higher Ground
April 12, 2012	Philadelphia	United States	The Fillmore at the Theatre of Living Arts
April 13, 2012	New York City	United States	Irving Plaza
April 14, 2012	Poughkeepsie	United States	The Loft
April 15, 2012	Baltimore	United States	The Ottobar
April 17, 2012	Richmond	United States	The Canal Club
April 18, 2012	Chapel Hill	United States	Local 506
April 19, 2012	Charlotte	United States	Visulite Theatre
April 20, 2012	Atlanta	United States	The Masquerade
April 21, 2012	Jacksonville	United States	Jack Rabbits
April 22, 2012	St. Petersburg	United States	State Theatre
April 24, 2012	Fort Lauderdale	United States	The Culture Room
April 25, 2012	Orlando	United States	The Social
April 27, 2012^{[A]}	Providence	United States	Lupo's Heartbreak Hotel
April 28, 2012^{[A]}	Hampton Beach	United States	Hampton Beach Casino Ballroom
April 29, 2012^{[A]}	Huntington	United States	Paramount Theatre
May 1, 2012^{[A]}	Silver Spring	United States	The Fillmore Silver Spring
May 2, 2012^{[A]}	Montclair	United States	Wellmont Theatre
May 3, 2012	Boston	United States	Paradise Rock Club
May 4, 2012^{[A]}	Atlantic City	United States	House of Blues Atlantic City
May 5, 2012^{[A]}	Pittsburgh	United States	Stage AE
May 6, 2012^{[A]}	Grand Rapids	United States	The Orbit Room
May 8, 2012^{[A]}	Des Moines	United States	Val Air Ballroom
May 9, 2012^{[A]}	Sioux Falls	United States	W.H. Lyon Fairgrounds
May 11, 2012^{[A]}	Dallas	United States	Palladium Ballroom
May 12, 2012^{[A]}	San Antonio	United States	Sunken Garden
May 13, 2012^{[A]}	Houston	United States	House of Blues Houston
May 15, 2012^{[A]}	Oklahoma City	United States	Diamond Ballroom
May 16, 2012^{[A]}	Kansas City	United States	Uptown Theater
May 18, 2012^{[A]}	Minneapolis	United States	The Brick Minneapolis
May 19, 2012^{[A]}	Milwaukee	United States	Eagles Ballroom
South America
July 29, 2012	Buenos Aires	Argentina	Teatro Flores
August 1, 2012	Santiago	Chile	Teatro Oriente
August 3, 2012	Curitiba	Brazil	Espaço Cult
August 4, 2012	São Paulo	Brazil	HSBC Brasil
August 5, 2012	Rio de Janeiro	Brazil	Circo Voador
Asia
September 28, 2012	Taipei	Taiwan	Legacy Taipei
September 30, 2012^{[B]}	Pasay	Philippines	SMX Convention Center

Festivals and other miscellaneous performances
^{A} This concert was a part of "Hello Cruel World Tour", supporting Marilyn Manson
^{B} This concert was a part of "Bazooka Rocks Festival"

Cancellations and rescheduled shows

April 10, 2012	Boston	Paradise Rock Club	Postponed to May 3
April 15, 2012	Washington, D.C.	The Rock 'N' Roll Hotel	Cancelled

=== Box office score data ===
Venue	City	Tickets Sold / Available	Gross Revenue
The Den	Calgary	358 / 450 (79%)	$6,736
Starlite Room	Edmonton	362 / 700 (51%)	$6,603
West End Cultural Centre	Winnipeg	359 / 400 (89%)	$6,336
Louis Pub	Saskatoon	332 / 500 (66%)	$5,635
The Exchange	Regina	184 / 300 (61%)	$3,148
Newport Music Hall	Cleveland	382 / 1,000 (38%)	$7,086
Metropolis	Montreal	937 / 1,200 (78%)	$22,642
Le Cercle	Quebec City	396 / 400 (99%)	$7,176
TOTAL		3,310 / 4,950 (67%)	$65,362
