= Hit Me Like a Man EP =

EP by The Pretty Reckless
- Released: March 2, 2012
- Recorded: 2011–2012
- Venue: Hammersmith Apollo (London, England)
- Studio: House of Loud (Elmwood Park, New Jersey)
- Genre: Alternative rock; hard rock; post-grunge
- Length: 19:56
- Label: Interscope
- Producer: Kato Khandwala

The Pretty Reckless chronology
Light Me Up (2010)	Hit Me Like a Man EP (2012)	Going to Hell (2014)

Hit Me Like a Man EP is the second extended play (EP) by the American rock band The Pretty Reckless. It was released on March 2, 2012, by Interscope Records. The EP contains three new songs, as well as live renditions of "Make Me Wanna Die" and "Since You're Gone"—originally included on the band's debut studio album, Light Me Up (2010)—which were recorded at London's Hammersmith Apollo on November 4 and 5, 2011.

In support of the EP, The Pretty Reckless embarked on a North American tour called The Medicine Tour in March and April 2012, followed by dates on Marilyn Manson's Hey Cruel World... Tour in April and May 2012.

== Critical reception ==
Professional ratings
Review scores
Source	Rating
AllMusic	3/5 stars
Digital Spy	4/5 stars

Robert Copsey of Digital Spy praised the EP as "a collection of wonderfully salacious and unashamedly bare-faced songs that today's charts are sorely lacking."

Stephen Thomas Erlewine of AllMusic viewed the three new songs on the EP as "harder and better than much of [the band's] guilty-pleasure debut, Light Me Up", concluding, "Sure, former child actress [Taylor] Momsen may just be acting out her teenage rebellion on a large stage and her imagination may be limited, but she is not insincere and the heartfelt tawdriness of Hit Me Like a Man is oddly compelling."

== Track listing ==
All tracks are written by Taylor Momsen and Ben Phillips, except where noted.

No.	Title	Length
1.	"Make Me Wanna Die" (live in London) (Kato Khandwala, Taylor Momsen, Ben Phillips)	4:12
2.	"Hit Me Like a Man"	3:33
3.	"Under the Water"	4:03
4.	"Since You're Gone" (live in London) (Khandwala, Momsen, Phillips)	3:25
5.	"Cold Blooded"	4:43
Total length:		19:56

== Personnel ==
Credits adapted from the liner notes of Hit Me Like a Man EP.

The Pretty Reckless

- Taylor Momsen – vocals
- Ben Phillips – guitar (all tracks), backing vocals (tracks: 1, 4), shared lead vocals (track: 5)
- Mark Damon – bass
- Jamie Perkins – drums

Additional personnel

- Kato Khandwala – production, engineering, mixing (all tracks), programming (tracks: 1, 4), guitar, strings, keyboards (tracks: 2, 3), recording (tracks: 2, 3, 5)
- Brian Robbins – engineering assistance (tracks: 2, 3)
- Jon Cohan – drum tech (tracks: 2, 3, 5)
- Jeff Kazee – organ (track: 5)

== Charts ==
Chart (2012)	Peak position
US Top Rock Albums (Billboard)	44

== Release history ==
Region	Date	Format	Label	Ref.
Australia	March 2, 2012	Digital download	Interscope	
Canada	March 6, 2012	Digital download	Interscope	
United States	March 6, 2012	Digital download	Interscope	
Canada	April 3, 2012	CD	Interscope	
United States	April 3, 2012	CD	Interscope	
