= Light Me Up Tour =

2010–12 concert tour by the Pretty Reckless

- Tour by The Pretty Reckless
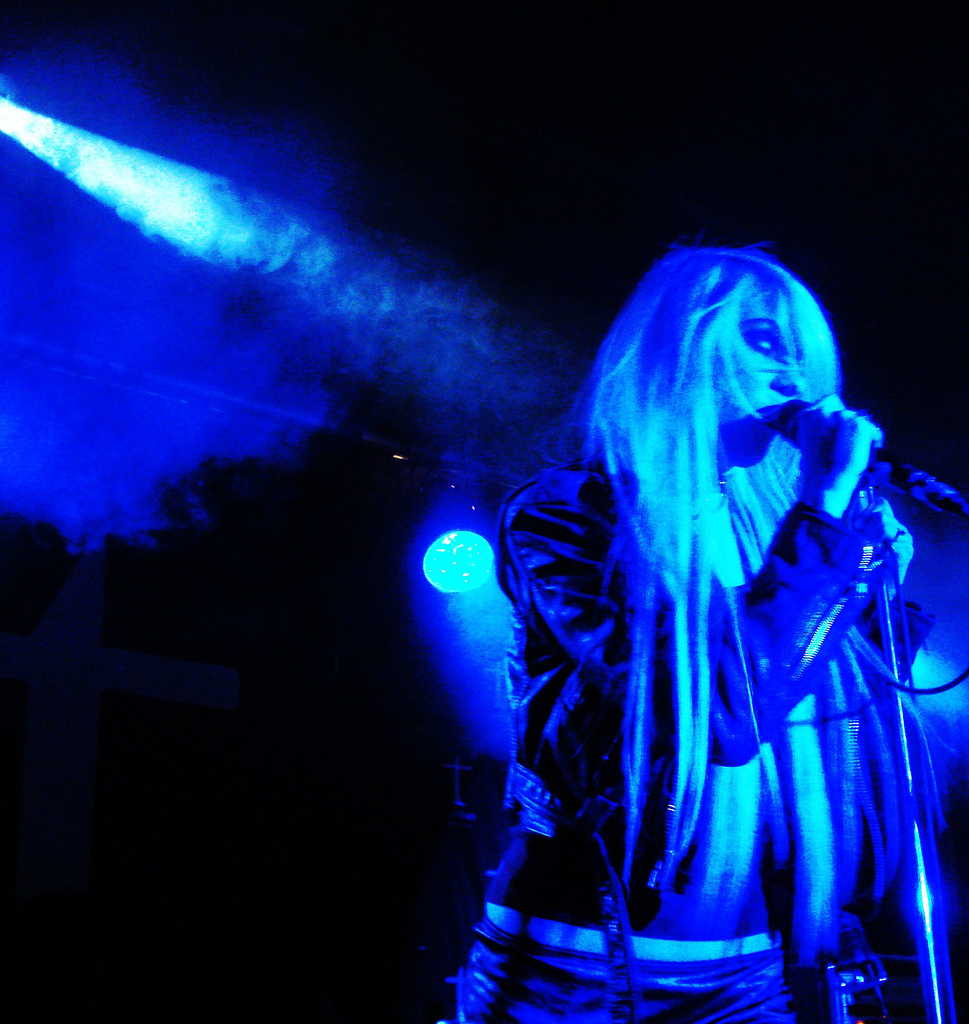
- Momsen on tour on 26 February 2011 in Toronto, Ontario, Canada
- Associated album: Light Me Up
- Start date: August 19, 2010
- End date: March 5, 2012
- Legs: 12
- No. of shows: 43 in Europe; 54 in North America; 8 in Asia; 7 in Oceania; 112 in total

The Pretty Reckless concert chronology
- Light Me Up Tour (2010–12); The Medicine Tour (2012)

The Light Me Up Tour was the first headline tour by American rock band the Pretty Reckless, in support of their debut studio album, Light Me Up. The tour began on August 19, 2010, and concluded on March 5, 2012, with a total of 112 shows.

== Background ==
The Light Me Up tour kicked off in London, England, at the O2 Academy Islington; following these two performances, the band appeared at the V Festival.

In February 2011, the band toured the United States extensively; then, the band set off on a festival-based European summer tour performing at twelve major international music festivals. Some of these festivals included the Download Festival in England and the Rock am Ring and Rock im Park festivals in Germany.

Throughout August 2011, the Pretty Reckless performed in Tokyo and Osaka as part of the Summer Sonic Festival. The band was scheduled to perform at the Soundwave Revolution from September 24, 2011 – October 3, 2011, before the festival series was cancelled. Some of the artists scheduled to play were invited back to Australia to perform in a replacement mini-festival tour called Counter Revolution. The Pretty Reckless were among those artists that decided to return. But they too eventually pulled out of the festival series.

It was confirmed in October 2011 that the Pretty Reckless would perform at Soundwave in 2012.

On July 26, 2011, Taylor Momsen announced via Twitter that the Pretty Reckless would tour Europe alongside Evanescence and Fair To Midland; eventually, a North American leg was announced with the Pretty Reckless and Rival Sons opening for Evanescence.

On February 9, 2012, the Pretty Reckless announced they would play two SideWaves in Sydney and Melbourne, Australia.

== Opening acts ==
- Francesqa (UK 2010)
- Runner Runner (US, Spring 2011)
- A Thousand Horses (US, Spring 2011 Selected Dates)
- Heroes For Hire (Australian SideWaves 2012)

== Tour dates ==
Date	City	Country	Venue
Europe
August 19, 2010	London	England	O2 Academy Islington
August 21, 2010^{[A]}	Chelmsford	England	Hylands Park
August 22, 2010^{[A]}	Staffordshire	England	Weston Park
North America
October 10, 2010	Baltimore	United States	Bourbon Street Ballroom
October 16, 2010	Niagara Falls	United States	Hard Rock Cafe
October 17, 2010	Toronto	Canada	Bovine Sex Club
Europe
December 9, 2010	Paris	France	La Maroquinerie
December 13, 2010	Glasgow	Scotland	Barrowland Ballroom
December 14, 2010	Manchester	England	Manchester Academy
December 15, 2010	Wolverhampton	England	Wulfrun Hall
December 16, 2010	London	England	Shepherd's Bush Empire
December 17, 2010	Cologne	Germany	Luxor
North America
February 11, 2011	Los Angeles	United States	El Rey Theatre
February 12, 2011	San Diego	United States	Soma Sidestage
February 14, 2011	Scottsdale	United States	Martini Ranch
February 16, 2011	Austin	United States	Stubb's
February 17, 2011	Houston	United States	House of Blues Houston
February 19, 2011	Dallas	United States	House of Blues Dallas
February 20, 2011	Oklahoma City	United States	The Conservatory
February 22, 2011	St. Louis	United States	Firebird
February 23, 2011	Indianapolis	United States	Earth House
February 24, 2011	Pontiac	United States	The Pike Room
February 25, 2011	Niagara Falls	United States	Hard Rock Cafe Niagara Falls
February 26, 2011	Toronto	Canada	Tattoo Rock Parlour
February 27, 2011	Montreal	Canada	La Tulipe
March 2, 2011	New York City	United States	Santos Party House
March 3, 2011	Boston	United States	Brighton Music Hall
March 4, 2011	Philadelphia	United States	World Cafe Live
March 10, 2011	Chicago	United States	Beat Kitchen
March 11, 2011	Columbus	United States	The Basement
March 12, 2011	Cleveland	United States	The Grog Shop
March 13, 2011	Pittsburgh	United States	Club AE
March 16, 2011	Baltimore	United States	The Ottobar
March 17, 2011	Vienna	United States	Jammin' Java
March 18, 2011	Asbury Park	United States	Wonder Bar
March 20, 2011	Hartford	United States	Webster Underground
Europe
March 25, 2011^{[B]}	Paris	France	Fnac Champs-Elyseés
North America
April 12, 2011^{[C]}	New York City	United States	Best Buy 14th Street
April 16, 2011^{[C]}	Long Island	United States	Looney Tunes
April 21, 2011^{[C]}	Los Angeles	United States	Hard Rock Cafe Los Angeles
May 28, 2011	Dover	United States	Dover Brick House
Europe
June 3, 2011^{[D]}	Nürburg	Germany	Nürburgring
June 5, 2011^{[E]}	Nuremberg	Germany	Frankenstadion
June 6, 2011	Hamburg	Germany	Uebel & Gefährlich
June 7, 2011	Berlin	Germany	Columbia Club
June 8, 2011	Paris	France	Le Trianon
June 9, 2011	Amsterdam	Netherlands	Paradiso
June 11, 2011^{[F]}	Venice	Italy	Parco San Giuliano
June 12, 2011^{[G]}	Leicester	England	Donington Park
June 13, 2011^{[H]}	Nickelsdorf	Austria	Burgenland
July 1, 2011^{[I]}	Arras	France	Citadelle Vauban
July 2, 2011^{[J]}	Werchter	Belgium	Werchter Festival Grounds
July 3, 2011^{[K]}	London	England	Hyde Park
July 4, 2011^{[L]}	Monteux	Switzerland	Lake Geneva Bay
July 6, 2011	Barcelona	Spain	Barcelona Music Hall
July 7, 2011	Madrid	Spain	Sala Caracol
July 9, 2011^{[M]}	County Kildare	Ireland	Punchestown Racecourse
July 10, 2011^{[N]}	Kinross	Scotland	Balado Airfield
July 12, 2011	Moscow	Russia	Arena Moscow
July 13, 2011^{[O]}	St. Petersburg	Russia	City Park
North America
July 22, 2011^{[C]}	Lockport	United States	Ulrich City Center
August 6, 2011^{[P]}	Chicago	United States	Grant Park
August 7, 2011	Chicago	United States	Hard Rock Hotel: Chicago
Asia
August 11, 2011	Seoul	South Korea	Club Ellui
August 13, 2011^{[Q]}	Tokyo	Japan	Makuhari Messe
August 14, 2011^{[Q]}	Osaka	Japan	Maishima Sports Island
September 12, 2011^{[R]}	Beijing	China	Beijing Chaoyang Park
September 14, 2011	Hangzhou	China	Dian Livehouse
September 15, 2011	Shanghai	China	MAO Live House Shanghai
September 17, 2011	Guangzhou	China	Xi Wo Livehouse
September 18, 2011	Shenzhen	China	Huanggang Business Center
North America
October 8, 2011^{[S]}	Tulsa	United States	QuikTrip Center
October 10, 2011^{[T]}	Oakland	United States	Fox Oakland Theatre
October 11, 2011^{[T]}	Los Angeles	United States	Hollywood Palladium
October 14, 2011^{[T]}	Phoenix	United States	Comerica Theatre
October 15, 2011^{[T]}	Tucson	United States	AVA Amphitheater
October 18, 2011^{[T]}	San Antonio	United States	Sunken Garden Amphitheater
October 19, 2011^{[T]}	Dallas	United States	Palladium Ballroom
October 20, 2011	Kansas City	United States	The Beaumont Club
October 21, 2011^{[T]}	Milwaukee	United States	Eagles Ballroom
October 22, 2011^{[T]}	Chicago	United States	Congress Theater
October 24, 2011^{[T]}	Royal Oak	United States	Royal Oak Music Theatre
October 25, 2011^{[T]}	Toronto	Canada	Sound Academy
October 26, 2011	Ottawa	Canada	Ritual Nightclub
October 27, 2011^{[T]}	Montreal	Canada	Métropolis
October 28, 2011^{[T]}	Worcester	United States	Worcester Palladium
30 October 2011^{[T]}	Atlantic City	United States	House of Blues Atlantic City
1 November 2011^{[T]}	New York City	United States	Terminal 5
Europe
November 4, 2011^{[T]}	London	England	Hammersmith Apollo
November 5, 2011^{[T]}	London	England	Hammersmith Apollo
November 7, 2011^{[T]}	Manchester	England	Manchester Apollo
November 8, 2011^{[T]}	Glasgow	Scotland	O2 Academy Glasgow
November 10, 2011^{[T]}	Plymouth	England	Plymouth Pavilions
November 12, 2011^{[T]}	Leeds	England	O2 Academy Leeds
November 13, 2011^{[T]}	Birmingham	England	O2 Academy Birmingham
November 14, 2011	Lille	France	Le Splendid
November 15, 2011	Strasbourg	France	La Laiterie
November 16, 2011	Utrecht	Netherlands	Tivoli
November 17, 2011^{[T]}	Offenbach	Germany	Stadthalle Offenbach
November 18, 2011^{[T]}	Düsseldorf	Germany	Mitsubishi Electric Halle
November 20, 2011^{[T]}	Berlin	Germany	C-Halle
November 21, 2011^{[T]}	Munich	Germany	Zenith
North America
November 25, 2011^{[U]}	Worcester	United States	DCU Center
November 26, 2011^{[U]}	Camden	United States	Susquehanna Bank Center
November 28, 2011^{[U]}	Hamilton	Canada	Copps Coliseum
Oceania
February 25, 2012^{[V]}	Brisbane	Australia	RNA Showgrounds
February 26, 2012^{[V]}	Sydney	Australia	Sydney Showground
February 27, 2012	Sydney	Australia	The Bald Faced Stag Hotel
March 1, 2012	Melbourne	Australia	Thornbury Theatre
March 2, 2012^{[V]}	Melbourne	Australia	Melbourne Showground
March 3, 2012^{[V]}	Adelaide	Australia	Bonython Park
March 5, 2012^{[V]}	Perth	Australia	Claremont Showground

Festivals and other miscellaneous performances

^{A} This concert was a part of "V Festival"
^{B} This concert was a private show
^{C} This a meet and greet event followed by a private performance
^{D} This concert was a part of "Rock am Ring"
^{E} This concert was a part of "Rock im Park"
^{F} This concert was a part of "Heineken Jammin' Festival"
^{G} This concert was a part of "Download Festival"
^{H} This concert was a part of "Nova Rock Festival"
^{I} This concert was a part of "Main Square Festival"
^{J} This concert was a part of "Rock Werchter"
^{K} This concert was a part of "Wireless Festival"
^{L} This concert was a part of "Montreux Jazz Festival"
^{M} This concert was a part of "Oxegen"
^{N} This concert was a part of "T in the Park"
^{O} This concert was a part of "Tuborg GreenFest"
^{P} This concert was a part of "Lollapalooza"
^{Q} This concert was a part of "Summer Sonic Festival"
^{R} This concert was a part of "Intercity Music Festival"
^{S} This concert was a part of "Tulsa State Fair"
^{T} The Pretty Reckless were supporting Evanescence at this show
^{U} The Pretty Reckless were supporting Guns N' Roses at this show
^{V} This concert was a part of "Soundwave Revolution"

Cancellations and rescheduled shows

July 8, 2011	Oeiras, Portugal	Passeio Marítimo de Alges	Optimus Alive!	Cancelled
September 24, 2011	Brisbane, Australia	RNA Showgrounds	Soundwave Revolution	Cancelled
September 24, 2011	Brisbane, Australia	The Riverstage	Counter Revolution	Cancelled
September 25, 2011	Sydney, Australia	Old Kings Oval	Soundwave Revolution	Cancelled
September 25, 2011	Sydney, Australia	Luna Park Big Top	Counter Revolution	Cancelled
September 30, 2011	Melbourne, Australia	Tabcorp Park	Soundwave Revolution	Cancelled
September 30, 2011	Melbourne, Australia	Myer Music Bowl	Counter Revolution	Cancelled
October 1, 2011	Adelaide, Australia	Showgrounds	Soundwave Revolution	Cancelled
October 2, 2011	Adelaide, Australia	Fowlers Live and Courtyard	Counter Revolution	Cancelled
October 3, 2011	Perth, Australia	Arena Joondalup	Soundwave Revolution	Cancelled
October 3, 2011	Perth, Australia	Capitol and Amplifer	Counter Revolution	Cancelled

=== Box office score data ===
Venue	City	Tickets sold/available	Gross revenue
La Tulipe	Montreal	700/700 (100%)	$10,737
The Basement	Columbus	300/300 (100%)	$4,902
Club AE	Pittsburgh	208/400 (52%)	$3,858
Music Theater	Royal Oak	1,700/1,700 (100%)	$61,200
Metropolis	Montreal	2,298/2,300 (99%)	$85,161
House of Blues	Atlantic City	2,550/2,550 (100%)	$91,405
TOTAL		7,756/7,950 (98%)	$257,263
