= Death by Rock and Roll (song) =

2020 song by The Pretty Reckless

Single by The Pretty Reckless

from the album Death by Rock and Roll
- Released: May 15, 2020
- Genre: Hard rock; post-grunge
- Length: 3:54
- Label: Fearless
- Songwriters: Taylor Momsen; Ben Phillips
- Producer: Jonathan Wyman

The Pretty Reckless singles chronology
"Back to the River" (2017)	"Death by Rock and Roll" (2020)	"And So It Went" (2021)

"Death by Rock and Roll" is a song recorded by American rock band The Pretty Reckless, released as the lead single from their fourth studio album of the same name. "Death by Rock and Roll" was released to digital retailers on May 15, 2020, and to active rock radio on June 9, 2020, as the album's lead single. It is the band's first single for Fearless Records.

== Background ==
"Death by Rock and Roll" was written by band members Taylor Momsen and Ben Phillips. The song serves as a tribute to late producer Kato Khandwala, who worked on the group's first three albums. The song was produced by Jonathan Wyman, making it their first song to be produced by a different producer.

== Commercial performance ==
In July 2020, "Death by Rock and Roll" became The Pretty Reckless's fifth number-one single on the Billboard's Mainstream Rock chart, setting a new record for female-fronted rock groups. The song remained atop the chart for three consecutive weeks. The song also topped Billboard's Canada Rock, marking their first number one on the chart.

== Music video ==
The Pretty Reckless released an animated lyric video for Death by Rock and Roll on June 18, 2020, featuring art direction from Lucas David and animation by Astra Zero.

== Charts ==
=== Weekly charts ===
Weekly chart performance for "Death by Rock and Roll"
Chart (2020)	Peak position
Canada Rock (Billboard)	1
US Hot Rock & Alternative Songs (Billboard)	19
US Rock Airplay (Billboard)	6

=== Year-end charts ===
Year-end chart performance for "Death by Rock and Roll"
Chart (2020)	Position
US Rock Airplay (Billboard)	36

== Release history ==
Region	Date	Format	Version	Label	Ref.
Various	May 15, 2020	Digital download; streaming	Original	Fearless	
United States	June 9, 2020	Active rock	Original	Fearless; Concord	
Various	August 21, 2020	Digital download; streaming	Acoustic	Fearless	
