= And So It Went =

2021 single by The Pretty Reckless

Single by the Pretty Reckless featuring Tom Morello

from the album Death by Rock and Roll
- Released: January 8, 2021
- Length: 4:30
- Label: Fearless
- Songwriters: Taylor Momsen; Ben Phillips
- Producers: Taylor Momsen; Ben Phillips; Jonathan Wyman

The Pretty Reckless singles chronology
"Death by Rock and Roll" (2020)	"And So It Went" (2021)	"Only Love Can Save Me Now" (2021)

Music video
- "And So It Went" on YouTube

"And So It Went" is a song recorded by American rock band the Pretty Reckless featuring American guitarist Tom Morello for the former's fourth studio album, Death by Rock and Roll (2021). Group members Taylor Momsen and Ben Phillips co-wrote the song and co-produced it with Jonathan Wyman. "And So It Went" was released January 8, 2021 as the second single from the album.

== Critical reception ==
Mike DeWald of Riff Magazine cited the song as "one of the album's best moments," praising the grunge influence and Morello's guitar solo. Emily Carter of Kerrang! was similarly complementary towards the solo, writing that "[the] guitar hero leaves an almighty impact with his riffing."

== Commercial performance ==
"And So It Went" reached number one on the Billboard Mainstream Rock chart, becoming the group's sixth song to top that chart and extending the band's record for the female-fronted group with the most number ones. The song also became the group's fifth top-ten on the Canada Rock chart, peaking at number five.

== Music video ==
An accompanying music video for "And So It Went" was directed by Jon J and Taylor Momsen and premiered February 4, 2021. It opens with a shot of Tom Morello's famous “Soul Power” Stratocaster guitar but Morello himself does not appear in the clip. The clip's "darkly affecting" visuals reflect the song's lyrics, which Momsen said were inspired by the world being in "a state of civil unrest."

== Track listing ==
Digital single

1. "And So It Went" – 4:30
2. "25" – 5:26
3. "Death by Rock and Roll" – 3:54

== Charts ==
=== Weekly charts ===
Weekly chart performance for "And So It Went"
Chart (2021)	Peak position
Canada Rock (Billboard)	5
US Hot Rock & Alternative Songs (Billboard)	46
US Rock & Alternative Airplay (Billboard)	7

=== Year-end charts ===
Year-end chart performance for "And So It Went"
Chart (2021)	Position
US Rock Airplay (Billboard)	33

== Release history ==
Region	Date	Format	Label	Ref.
Various	January 8, 2021	Digital download; streaming	Fearless	
United States	January 12, 2021	Active rock	Fearless; Concord	
