= Kill Me (The Pretty Reckless song) =

Single by The Pretty Reckless
- Released: December 7, 2012
- Genre: Alternative rock; hard rock
- Length: 3:47
- Label: Interscope
- Songwriters: Taylor Momsen; Ben Phillips; Kato Khandwala
- Producer: Kato Khandwala

The Pretty Reckless singles chronology
"Just Tonight" (2010)	"Kill Me" (2012)	"Going to Hell" (2013)

"Kill Me" is a song by American rock band the Pretty Reckless, released as a single on December 7, 2012, by Interscope Records. The song was initially intended to serve as the lead single from the band's then-untitled second studio album, as announced by lead singer Taylor Momsen through her Twitter account. However, after the Pretty Reckless moved record labels from Interscope to Razor & Tie, "Kill Me" was left out of the band's second album, Going to Hell (2014), although it was included as a bonus track on the Japanese edition of the album.

On December 17, 2012, the track was featured at the end of the final episode of the television series Gossip Girl, where Momsen made a guest appearance as her character Jenny Humphrey, having previously left the show in May 2011.

== Track listing ==
- Digital download
1. "Kill Me" – 3:47

== Charts ==
Chart (2012)	Peak position
UK Rock & Metal (Official Charts)	22

== Release history ==
Region	Date	Format	Label	Ref.
Ireland	December 7, 2012	Digital download	Polydor	
Australia	December 11, 2012	Digital download	Universal	
United Kingdom	December 11, 2012	Digital download	Polydor	
United States	December 11, 2012	Digital download	Interscope	
Germany	March 6, 2013	Digital download	Universal	
