= Just Tonight =

2010 single by the Pretty Reckless

Single by the Pretty Reckless

from the album Light Me Up
- Released: December 23, 2010
- Studio: Water Music (Hoboken, New Jersey); House of Loud (Elmwood Park, New Jersey)
- Genre: Alternative rock
- Length: 2:47
- Label: Interscope
- Songwriters: Taylor Momsen; Ben Phillips; Kato Khandwala
- Producer: Kato Khandwala

The Pretty Reckless singles chronology
"Miss Nothing" (2010)	"Just Tonight" (2010)	"Kill Me" (2012)

Music video
- "Just Tonight" on YouTube

"Just Tonight" is a song by American rock band the Pretty Reckless from their debut studio album, Light Me Up (2010). Band members Taylor Momsen and Ben Phillips co-wrote the song with its producer, Kato Khandwala. It was released on December 23, 2010, as the third and final single from the album.

== Release ==
The release date for the single was originally announced as November 9, 2010 before being pushed back to December 13. The release date was pushed back again to December 26, when it was released as a digital download.

== Critical reception ==
"Just Tonight" received mostly positive reviews from critics. Robert Copsey of Digital Spy gave it four out of five stars, saying, "A song about being stuck in a flagging relationship may not tread any new lyrical ground, but when it's backed by a chunky pop/rock melody, thrashing guitars and oh-so smoky vocals, the result is more gratifying than that first sip of blue WKD round ya mate's". Fraser McAlpine of BBC Radio 1's The Chart Blog gave the song four out of five stars, praising singer Momsen's vocals and describing the song as "a thoughtful, hurt sort of a song" that "plays straight—from the heart to the heart—and is all the better for it." OddOne of Unreality Shout rated the song four-and-a-half out of five stars, calling it "just brilliant—there's hooks, emotion, thought-provoking lyrics, all topped off with a monstrous chorus that brings plenty of teenaged angst to proceedings". In a less enthusiastic review, Rebecca Nicholson of The Guardian felt that the song "sounds like Evanescence doing a song for the sole reason of soundtracking an emotional scene on Grey's Anatomy".

== Live performances ==
In the United Kingdom, the band performed "Just Tonight" on BBC Radio 1's Live Lounge and on Live from Studio Five on December 11, 2010. In the United States, they performed the song on Lopez Tonight on February 11, 2011.

== Music video ==
The video for the song was directed by Meiert Avis, who had directed the videos for the band's previous singles, "Make Me Wanna Die" and "Miss Nothing". The video was produced by Jeremy Alter. The video was shot on location at the Kingsbridge Armory in the Bronx, New York City, and premiered on Vevo on November 2, 2010. It was featured as the "Free Music Video of the Week" in February 2011 on iTunes.

== Track listing ==
- UK and Irish digital EP
1. "Just Tonight" – 2:47
2. "Just Tonight" (acoustic version) – 3:04
3. "Just Tonight" (music video) – 3:03

== Credits and personnel ==
Credits adapted from the liner notes of Light Me Up.

The Pretty Reckless

- Taylor Momsen – vocals, backing vocals
- Ben Phillips – guitar
- Jamie Perkins – drums

Additional personnel

- Kato Khandwala – production, engineering, mixing, guitar, bass, percussion, programming, string arrangement
- John Bender – backing vocals
- Michael "Mitch" Milan – engineering assistance
- James Frazee – engineering assistance
- Jon Cohan – drum tech

== Charts ==
Chart performance for "Just Tonight"
Chart (2010–2011)	Peak position
UK Singles (OCC)	163
UK Rock & Metal (Official Charts)	9
US Rock Digital Songs (Billboard)	25

== Release history ==
Release dates and formats for "Just Tonight"
Region	Date	Format	Label	Ref.
Ireland	December 23, 2010	Digital download	Polydor	
United Kingdom	December 26, 2010	Digital download	Polydor	
France	February 14, 2011	Digital download	Universal	
Germany	February 14, 2011	Digital download	Universal	
