= Only Love Can Save Me Now (song) =

2021 song by The Pretty Reckless

Single by The Pretty Reckless featuring Kim Thayil and Matt Cameron

from the album Death by Rock and Roll
- Released: June 22, 2021
- Studio: London Bridge (Seattle, Washington)
- Genre: Post-grunge
- Length: 5:12
- Label: Fearless; Century Media
- Songwriters: Taylor Momsen; Ben Phillips
- Producer: Jonathan Wyman

The Pretty Reckless singles chronology
"And So It Went" (2021)	"Only Love Can Save Me Now" (2021)	"For I Am Death" (2025)

Acoustic single artwork

Music video
- "Only Love Can Save Me Now" on YouTube

"Only Love Can Save Me Now" is a song by American rock band The Pretty Reckless, from their fourth studio album, Death by Rock and Roll. It features Kim Thayil and Matt Cameron from the rock band Soundgarden, and was released on June 22, 2021, as the album's third single. The song topped the Billboard Mainstream Rock Songs chart in September 2021.

== Background and recording ==
Frontwoman Taylor Momsen said that The Pretty Reckless opened for Soundgarden on their final tour before Chris Cornell's death, which she said created a bond. Momsen said that she had become close with Soundgarden members Kim Thayil and Matt Cameron. After writing the song, she sent a demo to Cameron and Thayil and asked whether they would be interested in performing on it, because she felt the song was "very much in their vein". In May 2020, Blabbermouth.net confirmed that the song would feature guest appearances from Cameron and Thayil. The track was recorded at Seattle's London Bridge Studio. Momsen described recording at London Bridge Studio with Cameron and Thayil as a "surreal" experience, noting that Ten and Louder Than Love were recorded there. Momsen joked that without their involvement, she would sound as though she was "ripping [them] off". She described recording the song with Cameron and Thayil as a "full circle moment". People magazine reported that Momsen recorded the song with Cameron and Thayil as an homage to Cornell. Momsen stated that the song was "born out of tragedy" and described it as representing getting through "the worst time" in her life.

== Composition ==
Momsen described the song as having a "Soundgarden-esque feel". Thayil said that the song contains elements of classic Soundgarden and that its riff would likely have fit on Louder Than Love. Thayil also praised Ben Phillips' guitar parts, saying that they provided a heavy foundation for the song. Backing vocals are provided by Cameron, and the song features a 45-second guitar solo at the three-minute mark.

Guitar World noted that the song "features several signature Soundgarden traits", including an opening riff in 7/4 time, "modal motifs", "and nearly a full minute of wailing, wah-drenched Thayil leads". Mike DeWald of Riff Magazine wrote that the song's "bluesy grunge riffs" recalled 1990s grunge bands such as Soundgarden and Alice in Chains. Distorted Sound described the song as "further down the post-grunge rabbithole". Lauryn Schaffner of Loudwire noted the song's odd time signatures, Thayil's "distinctly deep and sludgy" guitar tone, and Cameron's "thunderous percussion", which she said "rounds out the Soundgarden feel completely". She also wrote that the airy effect on Momsen's vocals was reminiscent of Soundgarden's "Searching with My Good Eye Closed".

== Critical reception ==
Riff Magazine praised the song's chorus and melodic buildup, as well as Phillips' guitar solo. Jack Press of Distorted Sound likened the song to what a latter-era Alter Bridge and Soundgarden supergroup might sound like. Metal Hammer described the song as a "Soundgarden-esque sludge-fest". James Hickie of Kerrang! called the song a "firm highlight" of the album. Dom Lawson of Blabbermouth.net described it as "a simply great song" and noted the "blistering leads" from Phillips.

Loudwire ranked "Only Love Can Save Me Now" at number two on its list of the 35 best rock songs of 2021.

== Track listing ==
"Only Love Can Save Me Now (acoustic)" single
No.	Title	Length
1.	"Only Love Can Save Me Now" (acoustic)	4:06
2.	"Only Love Can Save Me Now" (featuring Matt Cameron and Kim Thayil)	5:12
Total length:		9:18

== Music video ==
The music video was released on June 9, 2021. It depicts Taylor Momsen, Ben Phillips and Mark Damon performing alongside Kim Thayil and Matt Cameron against a backdrop of ocean waves, rain and lightning. Momsen is also shown performing in a flooded room.

== Live performances ==
During a concert at Seattle's Moore Theatre on August 31, 2022, Kim Thayil joined The Pretty Reckless onstage to perform "Only Love Can Save Me Now" and the Soundgarden song "Loud Love".

== Chart performance ==
"Only Love Can Save Me Now" became the band's seventh number-one single on the Billboard Mainstream Rock Airplay chart, reaching the top position on September 25, 2021. It was the third number-one single from Death by Rock and Roll. The song gave Kim Thayil and Matt Cameron their first Mainstream Rock Airplay number-one as individually billed soloists.

== Personnel ==
Credits adapted from Apple Music.

The Pretty Reckless

- Taylor Momsen – lead vocals
- Ben Phillips – guitar, bass guitar, keyboards, piano, backing vocals
- Jamie Perkins – drums, percussion
- Mark Damon – bass guitar

Additional musicians

- Matt Cameron – drums, percussion, backing vocals
- Kim A. Thayil – guitar
- Jonathan Wyman – guitar, drum programming, bass guitar
- Duncan Watt – piano, keyboards, organ

Production and engineering

- Jonathan Wyman – producer, mixing engineer, recording engineer
- Taylor Momsen – co-producer
- Ben Phillips – co-producer
- Nate Yacchichino – additional producer
- Ted Jensen – mastering engineer
- Sean Kelly – recording engineer
- Neil Hundt – drum technician

== Charts ==
=== Weekly charts ===
Weekly chart performance for "Only Love Can Save Me Now"
Chart (2021)	Peak position
Canada Rock (Billboard)	21
US Rock & Alternative Airplay (Billboard)	6
US Mainstream Rock Airplay (Billboard)	1

=== Year-end charts ===
Year-end chart performance for "Only Love Can Save Me Now"
Chart (2021)	Position
US Rock & Alternative Airplay (Billboard)	39
US Mainstream Rock Airplay (Billboard)	25
