= For I Am Death =

2025 song by The Pretty Reckless

Single by The Pretty Reckless

from the album Dear God
- Released: August 22, 2025
- Genre: Hard rock; alternative rock
- Length: 3:39
- Label: Fearless
- Songwriters: Taylor Momsen; Ben Phillips
- Producers: Momsen; Phillips; Jonathan Wyman

The Pretty Reckless singles chronology
| "Only Love Can Save Me Now" (2021) | "For I Am Death" (2025) | "When I Wake Up" (2026) |

Music video
- "For I Am Death / Life Evermore Pt.2" on YouTube

"For I Am Death" is a song by American rock band The Pretty Reckless, from their fifth studio album, Dear God. It was released on August 22, 2025, as the album's lead single. It was the band's first new song in four years, following the release of their 2021 album Death by Rock and Roll. It reached number one on the Billboard Mainstream Rock Airplay chart in November 2025.

== Background and release ==
Speaking about songwriting, Taylor Momsen said that some songs take a long time to develop, while others "fall out of the sky and land in your lap". Prior to the song's release, The Pretty Reckless teased new music by clearing their social media accounts and posting a teaser video announcing an August 22, 2025 reveal. Upon the song's release, Momsen said that she wanted the music to "speak for itself", allowing listeners to decide its meaning for themselves, and expressed interest in seeing how audiences interpreted the song. In an interview with Audacy Check In, Momsen declined to explain the song's meaning, stating that once music is released, "it doesn't belong to me anymore". Discussing the band's fifth studio album, Momsen described "For I Am Death" as the first song she wanted listeners to hear. She described the song as having come from "somewhere visceral" and expressed hope that listeners would connect with it emotionally.

== Composition ==
Writing for Consequence, Spencer Kaufman described the track as a riff-heavy hard rock song. Gregory Adams of Revolver wrote that the song features stop-start rhythms and opens with Momsen singing "there's something wrong with me". Writing for NME, Max Pilley described it as being powered by guitar riffs and raspy vocals. Amanda Hatfield of Alternative Press described the song as transitioning from a moody acoustic introduction into riff-heavy alternative rock. Writing for Stereoboard, Laura Johnson characterized it as an erratic rock song featuring an "earworm" chorus.

== Track listing ==
"For I Am Death" single
| No. | Title | Length |
|---|---|---|
| 1. | "For I Am Death" | 3:39 |

== Music video ==
The music video, directed by Lewis Cater, opens with a short ballad titled "Life Evermore Pt. 2" before transitioning into "For I Am Death". In September 2025, the band released behind-the-scenes footage from the making of the music video.

== Chart performance ==
"For I Am Death" reached number one on the Billboard Mainstream Rock Airplay chart on November 8, 2025. The song became the band's eighth number-one single on the chart and their fourth consecutive chart-topper.

== Personnel ==
Credits adapted from Apple Music.

The Pretty Reckless

- Taylor Momsen – vocals, songwriter, producer
- Ben Phillips – guitar, bass guitar, songwriter, producer
- Jamie Perkins – drums
- Mark Damon – bass guitar

Additional credits

- Jonathan Wyman – producer, mixing engineer, recording engineer
- Sean Kelly – assistant recording engineer
- Jeremy Delaney – assistant recording engineer
- Jay Colangelo – additional engineer
- Adam Ayan – mastering engineer
- Seth Drake – immersive mixing engineer

== Charts ==
=== Weekly charts ===
Weekly chart performance for "For I Am Death"
| Chart (2025–2026) | Peak position |
|---|---|
| Canada Rock (Billboard) | 4 |
| Canada Mainstream Rock (Billboard Canada) | 3 |
| UK Singles Sales (OCC) | 78 |
| UK Singles Downloads (OCC) | 73 |
| US Rock & Alternative Airplay (Billboard) | 5 |
| US Mainstream Rock Airplay (Billboard) | 1 |

=== Year-end charts ===
Year-end chart performance for "For I Am Death"
| Chart (2025) | Position |
|---|---|
| Canada Mainstream Rock (Billboard) | 62 |
