= The Pretty Reckless (EP) =

EP by The Pretty Reckless
- Released: June 22, 2010
- Recorded: 2009–2010
- Genre: Alternative rock
- Length: 13:51
- Label: Interscope
- Producer: Kato Khandwala

The Pretty Reckless chronology
The Pretty Reckless (2010)	Light Me Up (2010)

Singles from The Pretty Reckless
- 1. "Make Me Wanna Die" Released: May 13, 2010

The Pretty Reckless is the self-titled debut EP by the American rock band The Pretty Reckless. It was released on June 22, 2010, by Interscope Records. The album's lead single, "Make Me Wanna Die", was released on May 13, 2010.

== Singles ==
On December 30, 2009, the first single entitled "Make Me Wanna Die" was released as a special preview for the Seventeen magazine. The song was officially released on May 13, 2010 in the UK, where it peaked at 1# on the UK Rock Chart and was received with positive reviews. The track also appeared on the Kick-Ass soundtrack.

The promotional video was released on May 13, 2010 and was followed by the official version released on September 15, 2010.

== Critical reception ==
Professional ratings
Review scores
Source	Rating
Rolling Stone	2/5 stars

Christian Hoard of Rolling Stone classified the music as "generic".

== Track listing ==
All tracks are written by Taylor Momsen, Ben Phillips, and Kato Khandwala.

No.	Title	Length
1.	"Make Me Wanna Die"	3:54
2.	"My Medicine"	3:14
3.	"Goin' Down"	3:35
4.	"Zombie" (Physical CD bonus track)	3:08
Total length:		13:51
