= Miss Nothing =

2010 single by the Pretty Reckless

Single by the Pretty Reckless

from the album Light Me Up
- B-side: "Make Me Wanna Die" (acoustic)
- Released: August 18, 2010
- Studio: House of Loud (Elmwood Park, New Jersey)
- Genre: Hard rock; post-grunge
- Length: 3:12
- Label: Interscope
- Songwriters: Taylor Momsen; Ben Phillips; Kato Khandwala
- Producer: Kato Khandwala

The Pretty Reckless singles chronology
"Make Me Wanna Die" (2010)	"Miss Nothing" (2010)	"Just Tonight" (2010)

Music video
- "Miss Nothing" on YouTube

"Miss Nothing" is a song by American rock band the Pretty Reckless from their debut studio album, Light Me Up (2010). It was released on August 18, 2010, as the album's second single.

== Music video ==
The music video, directed by Meiert Avis, and produced by Jeremy Alter, was released on July 20, 2010 on Vevo and was shot with a Canon EOS 5D Mark II. It begins with ten people (Taylor Momsen included) sitting around a table in an imitation of the Last Supper. Momsen (as Mary Magdalene) starts to crawl over the table, tipping over the food and spilling the drinks whilst singing as the rest watch. Later she starts ripping apart a bouquet of roses. It ends with several "famous" people having joined in surrounding the table with Momsen on it, most noticeably John Lennon and Jimi Hendrix playing guitars and Charlie Chaplin. The band confirmed it is set after the death of Christ.

== Live performances ==
"Miss Nothing" has been performed live several times, first on "This Morning Show" on August 20, 2010, then on "The 5:19 Show" on August 20, 2010. These performances were followed with more two on "Radio 1 Live Lounge" and on "Unplugged for NME", on August 23, 2010 and August 25, respectively.

== Background ==
Lead singer Taylor Momsen said the song was about "a loved one passing, losing your identity and your mind", and described it as "not the happiest of songs". She also confirmed in an interview that the lyrics were censored because the word "cunt" is in the lyrics and that people did not realize she is saying the word. It is the only song on the album that has any swearing in the lyrics.

== Track listing ==
- UK digital EP and limited-edition 7-inch picture disc
1. "Miss Nothing"
2. "Make Me Wanna Die" (acoustic version)

== Credits and personnel ==
Credits adapted from the liner notes of Light Me Up.

The Pretty Reckless

- Taylor Momsen – vocals
- Ben Phillips – guitar
- Jamie Perkins – drums

Additional personnel

- Kato Khandwala – production, engineering, mixing, guitar, bass, percussion, programming, string arrangement
- John Bender – backing vocals
- Michael "Mitch" Milan – engineering assistance
- Jon Cohan – drum tech

== Charts ==
Chart performance for "Miss Nothing"
Chart (2010)	Peak position
Scottish Singles Sales (Official Charts)	26
UK Singles (Official Charts)	39

== Release history ==
Release dates and formats for "Miss Nothing"
Region	Date	Format	Label	Ref.
United Kingdom	August 18, 2010	7-inch picture disc	Polydor	
United Kingdom	August 22, 2010	Digital download	Polydor	
Australia	September 3, 2010	Digital download	Universal	
