= Death by Rock and Roll =

2021 album by the Pretty Reckless

Studio album by the Pretty Reckless
- Released: February 12, 2021
- Recorded: 2019–2020
- Studios: London Bridge (Seattle, Washington)
- Genres: Hard rock; post-grunge; alternative rock; Southern rock
- Length: 50:18
- Labels: Fearless; Century Media
- Producers: Jonathan Wyman; Taylor Momsen; Ben Phillips

The Pretty Reckless chronology
Who You Selling For (2016)	Death by Rock and Roll (2021)	Dear God (2026)

Singles from Death By Rock and Roll
- 1. "Death by Rock and Roll" Released: May 15, 2020; 2. "And So It Went" Released: January 8, 2021; 3. "Only Love Can Save Me Now" Released: June 22, 2021

Death by Rock and Roll is the fourth studio album by the American rock band the Pretty Reckless, released on February 12, 2021. It is the band's first album released with their new label, Fearless Records; it is also the band's first album since the death of their long-time producer, Kato Khandwala in 2018. The album was produced by Jonathan Wyman, vocalist Taylor Momsen, and guitarist Ben Phillips, along with additional production done by Nate Yacchichino. The album was preceded by two singles: "Death by Rock and Roll" and "And So It Went" featuring Tom Morello. There were also two promotional singles released prior to the album: "Broomsticks" and "25".

== Background and recording ==
In April 2018, the band's longtime-producer, Kato Khandwala, was involved in a motorcycle accident and died later due to injuries from the crash. Speaking about Khandwala's death, Taylor Momsen stated:

"That was the nail in the coffin for me. I threw my hands up in the air and kind of went 'Yeah, I give up.' I went down a very dark rabbit hole of depression and substance abuse and everything that comes with that."

The band was also struggling with the death of Soundgarden vocalist Chris Cornell in 2017; they had been touring in support of Soundgarden prior to Cornell's death.

In November 2019, it was announced that the band had begun working on their fourth studio album. The album's title, a phrase often used by Khandwala, was later revealed in February 2020. "It was like a code that we lived our life by, and that I still live my life by," Momsen said of the title. "It's very much a battle cry for life: live life your own way." The album was recorded at London Bridge Studios in Seattle, Washington.

== Release ==
The album was released on February 12, 2021. The lead single, "Death by Rock and Roll" was released on May 15, 2020. A promotional single, "Broomsticks", was released on October 22, 2020. The second promotional single, "25", was released on November 13, 2020. The second single, "And So It Went" (featuring Tom Morello), was released on January 8, 2021.

Speaking about releasing music during the COVID-19 pandemic in an interview with Kerrang!, lead vocalist Taylor Momsen stated:

"It is a very weird thing to be releasing music right now. It's always a bit nerve-wracking to put music out into the world at any time, but certainly releasing music in these very unprecedented times is a bit scary."

== Composition ==
Death by Rock and Roll has mainly been described as hard rock, alternative rock, and grunge. In describing the album, Good Call Live stated, "from heavy grunge-laden riffs to classic rock hooks, from theatrical rock to an almost country rock element this album has the band wearing their hearts on their sleeves." The title track has been described as an "outlaw-styled rock track with an ascending, evocative chorus and vibrant guitar melody." Kato Khandwala's footsteps can be heard in the song's intro. The song "Only Love Can Save Me Now," an homage to Chris Cornell, contains "bluesey grunge riffs", and has been compared to 90s grunge bands like Soundgarden and Alice in Chains. "And So It Went" has also been described as a grunge song and even features a guitar solo from Tom Morello. "25" has been described a leaning towards progressive rock. The song "My Bones" is a "no-frills rock" song and has been compared to Thin Lizzy and Kiss "Got So High" is a "semi-acoustic" song. "Broomsticks" is a short, Halloween-themed track and has been compared to Tim Burton movies. "Witches Burn" has been compared to Danzig. "Standing at the Wall" is a reflective and "semi-acoustic" song, similarly to "Got So High". "Turning Gold" has a "'80s rock feel". "Rock and Roll Heaven" is a country rock and "Americana-style ballad". The closing track, "Harley Darling" is a country rock, folk rock, and rootsy ballad, and is an homage to Khandwala.

== Critical reception ==
Professional ratings
Aggregate scores
Source	Rating
AnyDecentMusic?	7.0/10
Review scores
Source	Rating
The Arts Desk	3/5 stars
Blabbermouth.net	7/10
Classic Rock	4/5 stars
Distorted Sound	9/10
Gigwise	9/10 stars
Kerrang!	4/5
Metal Hammer	3/5 stars
NME	3/5 stars
Riff Magazine	9/10 stars
Upset	4/5 stars

Death by Rock and Roll received generally positive reviews from critics. Dom Lawson of Blabbermouth.net was positive towards the album stating, "fortunately, there are several genuinely great songs on here, all with huge amounts of disarming charm." Henry Yates of Classic Rock complimented the album as "their first attempt to claw back what they had", calling it "brilliant".

Vicky Greer of Gigwise called the album a "prime example of the healing power of rock and roll". James Hickie of Kerrang! was positive towards the album and considered the album to be "made by people who have suffered for their art and whose art will in turn soothe their suffering." Paris Fawcett of Metal Hammer was less positive stating, "TPR trade the rambunctious anthems of previous records for a vulnerable and reflective approach, yet often come across as more schmaltzy than tortured."

Sophie Williams of NME complimented Momsen's vocals saying that "her delivery is invariably the best thing about 'Death By Rock And Roll'." Bennie Osborne of Noizze called the album a "defining moment in their musical exploration". Mike DeWald of Riff Magazine stated, "Death By Rock and Roll thrives on its ability to surprise and delight while staying faithful to its core."

The album was elected by Loudwire as the 6th best rock/metal album of 2021.

== Commercial performance ==
In the United States, Death by Rock and Roll was the highest selling album in the country in its release week, selling 16,000 copies and earning 17,366 album equivalent units in total. The album debuted at the top of the Top Album Sales chart, becoming the band's first number one and third top ten, while debuting and peaking at 28 on Billboard 200. Of the total number of albums sold, 5,300 were sold in vinyl format, debuting at five on the Vinyl Albums Chart.

== Track listing ==
All tracks written by Taylor Momsen and Ben Phillips. All tracks produced by Momsen, Phillips and Jonathan Wyman.

Death by Rock and Roll track listing
No.	Title	Length
1.	"Death by Rock and Roll"	3:54
2.	"Only Love Can Save Me Now" (featuring Kim Thayil and Matt Cameron)	5:12
3.	"And So It Went" (featuring Tom Morello)	4:30
4.	"25"	5:26
5.	"My Bones"	4:47
6.	"Got So High"	3:20
7.	"Broomsticks"	0:38
8.	"Witches Burn"	4:53
9.	"Standing at the Wall"	3:58
10.	"Turning Gold"	4:09
11.	"Rock and Roll Heaven"	5:12
12.	"Harley Darling"	4:19
Total length:		50:18

== Personnel ==
The Pretty Reckless

- Taylor Momsen – lead vocals, rhythm guitar
- Ben Phillips – lead guitar, keyboards, piano, backing vocals
- Mark Damon – bass
- Jamie Perkins – drums, percussion

Additional musicians

- Kim Thayil – additional guitars (2)
- Matt Cameron – additional drums, additional vocals (2)
- Tom Morello – additional guitars (3)
- Sara Hallie Richardson – backing vocals
- Anna Lombard – backing vocals
- Isaac Phillips – harmonica
- David Pontbriand – sitar, tanpura
- Duncan Watt – keyboards, orchestra, organ, piano

Production

- Taylor Momsen – production
- Ben Phillips – production
- Jonathan Wyman – production, drum programming, engineering, mixing, additional guitars, keyboards
- Nate Yacchichino – additional production
- Ted Jensen – mastering
- Jay Colangelo – drum technician
- Neil Hundt – drum technician
- Danny Hastings – photography
- Sean Kelly – assistant engineer, production technician
- Adam Larson – package design

== Charts ==
=== Weekly charts ===
Weekly chart performance for Death by Rock and Roll
Chart (2021)	Peak position
Australian Albums (ARIA)	15
Austrian Albums (Ö3 Austria)	6
Belgian Albums (Ultratop Flanders)	38
Belgian Albums (Ultratop Wallonia)	40
Canadian Albums (Billboard)	28
Dutch Albums (Album Top 100)	51
Finnish Albums (Suomen virallinen lista)	46
French Albums (SNEP)	109
German Albums (Offizielle Top 100)	5
Italian Albums (FIMI)	66
Japanese Albums (Oricon)	107
Scottish Albums (Official Charts)	4
Swiss Albums (Schweizer Hitparade)	4
UK Albums (Official Charts)	6
UK Rock & Metal Albums (Official Charts)	1
US Billboard 200	28
US Top Hard Rock Albums (Billboard)	2
US Top Rock Albums (Billboard)	3

=== Year-end charts ===
Year-end chart performance for Death by Rock and Roll
Chart (2021)	Position
US Top Current Album Sales (Billboard)	130
