= Dear God (album) =

2026 album by the Pretty Reckless

Studio album by the Pretty Reckless
- Released: June 26, 2026
- Genres: Hard rock; post-grunge; blues rock
- Length: 50:07
- Label: Fearless
- Producers: Taylor Momsen; Ben Phillips; Jonathan Wyman

The Pretty Reckless chronology
Death by Rock and Roll (2021)	Dear God (2026)

Singles from Dear God
- 1. "For I Am Death" Released: August 22, 2025; 2. "When I Wake Up" Released: March 13, 2026

Dear God is the fifth studio album by the American rock band the Pretty Reckless, released on June 26, 2026, through Fearless Records. The album was produced by Jonathan Wyman, vocalist Taylor Momsen, and guitarist Ben Phillips. Two singles preceded the album: "For I Am Death" and "When I Wake Up". There were also two promotional singles released before the album: "Love Me" and "Dear God".

== Background ==
Taylor Momsen warned her agent as the band retreated into the studio "I’m making a new record – unless AC/DC or The Rolling Stones call, don’t bother!" To her surprise weeks later both bands wound up requesting The Pretty Reckless as a support act, AC/DC for the whole Power Up Tour and The Rolling Stones to open their 2024 concert at Allegiant Stadium. Thus the band delayed production to take part in the concerts.

The album's lead single, "For I Am Death", was the band's first song in four years. Two months later, the band announced a Christmas EP titled Taylor Momsen's Pretty Reckless Christmas. The EP had a release date of October 31 for digital, while its physical version released on November 14. Along with the announcement, the band released a reimagining of "Where Are You Christmas?". The song was originally performed by Momsen as Cindy Lou Who in the 2000 film How The Grinch Stole Christmas. Dear God was described as the band's "most emotionally raw and uncompromising record to date." The album was produced by Taylor Momsen, Ben Phillips, and Jonathan Wyman.

Speaking about the album's title track, Taylor Momsen stated:

"Dear God is desperation set to music...When life gets that physical, that brutal, you leave your body and start begging something bigger than yourself to pull you out. That space between heaven and hell isn’t a metaphor. It’s somewhere you actually live."

== Release and promotion ==
On August 22, 2025, the album's lead single, "For I Am Death", was released. "For I Am Death" became the band's eighth No. 1 on Billboard's Mainstream Rock Airplay chart. The album's second single, "When I Wake Up", was released on March 13, 2026. The album was announced the same day and it set to be released on June 26, 2026. A music video for the song was released five days later. "When I Wake Up" reached No. 4 on Billboard's Mainstream Rock Airplay chart. "Love Me" was released on April 17 and "Dear God" was released on May 22. A headline world tour in support of the album was announced, starting off North America and ending in Europe.

== Composition and themes ==
Dear God was primarily described as hard rock post-grunge, and blues rock. The album also contains elements of punk, garage rock, blues, funk, acoustic, folk, country, and country rock. The album's themes include mortality, self-discovery, chaos, and redemption.

== Critical reception ==
Professional ratings
Review scores
Source	Rating
AllMusic	3/5 stars
Blabbermouth.net	8.5/10
Distorted Sound	8/10
Kerrang!	4/5
Wall of Sound	7.5/10

Anne Erickson of Blabbermouth.net wrote, "the album continues with the band's promise of dirty, authentic rock music with a touch of polish, just enough to fit on rock airwaves...and it adds another layer to the band's evolving sound." Laura Davies of Distorted Sound described it as their "best album to date" because of its "huge riffs [and] sensational songwriting, with honest raw emotion." Emily Wilkes of Kerrang! described the album as being darker than most of their earlier work, and wrote that the album "spins some of their best songs yet from it." KJ Draven of Wall of Sound complimented the story telling, guitar solos and Taylor Momsen's vocals, but wrote, "[the album] does suffer from excessive cliches and clunky lyrics though there is a raw sincerity that makes the band a must listen."

== Track listing ==
All tracks are written by Taylor Momsen and Ben Phillips.

Dear God track listing
No.	Title	Length
1.	"Life Evermore Pt. 2"	0:43
2.	"For I Am Death"	3:40
3.	"When I Wake Up"	3:33
4.	"Love Me"	4:23
5.	"Dragonfire"	4:41
6.	"Dear God"	6:09
7.	"Life Evermore Pt. 3"	0:42
8.	"About You"	4:36
9.	"Spell on You"	3:46
10.	"Rollercoaster of Life"	4:26
11.	"Eye of the Storm"	4:14
12.	"Devil in Disguise (Michelle’s Song)"	2:40
13.	"Dark Days"	5:50
14.	"Life Evermore Pt. 1"	0:44
Total length:		50:07

== Personnel ==
Credits are adapted from Tidal.

=== The Pretty Reckless ===
- Mark Damon – bass guitar (tracks 1–4, 6, 8–11)
- Taylor Momsen – vocals, production
- Jamie Perkins – drums (1–11, 13, 14), percussion (10)
- Ben Phillips – guitar, production (all tracks); bass guitar (2, 4–10, 12–14), mandolin (5), percussion (12)

=== Additional contributors ===
- Jonathan Wyman – production, engineering, mixing (all tracks); keyboards (6, 10, 12), drum programming (10, 11)
- Jay Colangelo – additional engineering
- Jeremy Delaney – engineering assistance
- Sean Kelly – engineering assistance
- Adam Ayan – mastering
- Duncan Watt – keyboards (8, 11), organ (10), string arrangement (11)
- Logan Nikolic – ukulele (10)

== Charts ==
Chart performance for Dear God
Chart (2026)	Peak position
Australian Albums (ARIA)	7
Austrian Albums (Ö3 Austria)	4
Belgian Albums (Ultratop Flanders)	57
Belgian Albums (Ultratop Wallonia)	11
Dutch Vinyl Albums (Dutch Charts)	23
French Albums (SNEP)	75
French Rock & Metal Albums (SNEP)	4
German Albums (Offizielle Top 100)	7
German Rock & Metal Albums (Offizielle Top 100)	5
Scottish Albums (Official Charts)	2
Swiss Albums (Schweizer Hitparade)	11
UK Albums (Official Charts)	6
UK Rock & Metal Albums (Official Charts)	2
US Billboard 200	79
US Independent Albums (Billboard)	13
US Top Rock & Alternative Albums (Billboard)	21
