= Francesqa =

British four-piece rock band

- Origin: Newbury, Berkshire, United Kingdom
- Genre: Rock
- Years active: 2009–2011 2025-Present
- Members: Ashley Wilkie – Vocals; Ben Hordos – Bass; Tom Millar – Guitar; Warren Senior – Drums
- Past members: Joe Hicks – Guitar

Francesqa were a British four-piece rock band from Newbury, England.

== History ==
=== Formation ===
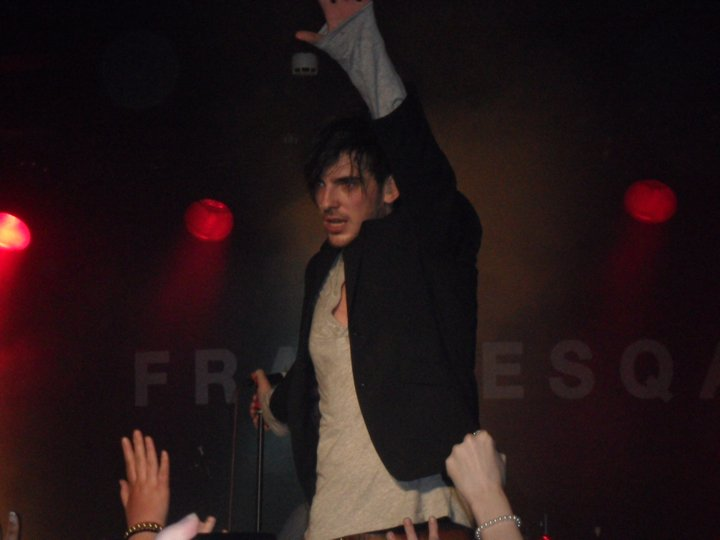
Francesqa's singer Ashley in Belfast on 19 February 2011

Francesqa formed in early 2009, and in its initial incarnation, consisted of just Ashley Wilkie and Ben Hordos. Both of which shared song writing and performing duties. The remaining members joined from recently broken up local Oxfordshire bands Monroe (where both Wilkie and Hordos were members alongside Joe Hicks and Tom Millar) and Greenacre (where Warren Senior had previously played drums and sang).

=== First EP ===
In the summer of 2009 the band self released a three track EP that subsequently became available on iTunes and from the band at shows (a fourth track entitled "Boy" became available as a b-side on the iTunes release). The band also played across much of the south of England in the latter half of 2009, often seen with likes of Canterbury and Lights And Sounds. In March 2010 the band embarked on a nationwide tour of the UK supporting Deaf Havana and All Forgotten. April also saw the band on a nationwide tour supporting The Broadcast.

=== Second EP: We Lived ===
Having already entered the studio in December 2009 with producer Peter Miles, Francesqa completed work on their follow-up EP, We Lived during the beginning of 2010. They independently released the five track record on 19 July 2010.

They also gained further fame after being picked by Tom DeLonge to play the Kerrang! Introducing Stage at the 2010 Slam Dunk festival alongside Futures, Deaf Havana, Not Advised, Straight Lines, and Kill Casino. Summer 2010 also saw them play the Kerrang! Arts Fest in Birmingham alongside both Elliot Minor and Young Guns.

=== Re-release of We lived EP ===
June 2010 saw the band sign to the UK booking agency 'The Agency Group' and the release of their first single and accompanying music video for "Ghosts". On 30 August 2010, the band released a Split EP with Philadelphia act Person L through the UK label, Scylla. The split record contained Francesqa's song "Years" plus a previously unreleased track titled "Lonely Home". The band's second single and accompanying video "Years" premiered exclusively on Kerrang.com on 6 September 2010.

The band joined Aiden as main support on their UK tour throughout November 2010. In December 2010, they supported The Pretty Reckless on their UK tour. February 2011 saw the band embark on their first full UK headline tour. The band also re-released the We Lived EP with "All I Had" and additional acoustic renditions of their previous work. They embarked on their second headline tour shortly after the departure of Joe Hicks on 6 May 2011. Francesqa joined Kids in Glass Houses' October 2011 tour as main support alongside Blitz Kids and Save Your Breath.

=== Debut album and break-up ===
The band were working on various demos and writing songs for their debut album. On 5 December 2011 the band announced on their website that they were going their separate ways but have since reformed as MMX and released their debut single "Cold World" and later in 2012, released their second single "Follow".

As of 2025 the band has reformed and released the Cold World ep in July.
