= Light Me Up =

2010 studio album by the Pretty Reckless

Studio album by the Pretty Reckless
- Released: August 27, 2010
- Recorded: August 2009 – April 2010
- Studios: Water Music (Hoboken, New Jersey); House of Loud (Elmwood Park, New Jersey)
- Genres: Alternative rock; hard rock; grunge; blues
- Length: 34:06
- Label: Interscope
- Producer: Kato Khandwala

The Pretty Reckless chronology
The Pretty Reckless (2010)	Light Me Up (2010)	Hit Me Like a Man EP (2012)

Alternative cover
- Japanese cover

Singles from Light Me Up
- 1. "Make Me Wanna Die" Released: May 13, 2010; 2. "Miss Nothing" Released: August 18, 2010; 3. "Just Tonight" Released: December 23, 2010

Light Me Up is the debut studio album by the American rock band the Pretty Reckless, released on August 27, 2010, by Interscope Records. The album received commercial success with the singles "Make Me Wanna Die", "Miss Nothing", and "Just Tonight".

== Background ==
The recording process started in 2008, after Taylor Momsen met producer Kato Khandwala and his partner, songwriter Ben Phillips. By mid-2009, they felt they had found an authentic sound. Two months before the album's release, the band released an eponymous EP containing four songs expected to appear in the then-future record. However, the song "Zombie" was not present in the initial track listing, later appearing on the North and South American release.

The album received much more success in the United Kingdom, where it was released months before the American release. The warmer British reception spanned the singles "Miss Nothing" and "Just Tonight", which were not released anywhere else.

== Singles ==
"Make Me Wanna Die" was released on May 13, 2010, as the album's lead single. A promotional video was released which features live performances and backstage footage of the band. This video is widely recognized as a viral version and was released on May 13, 2010. The official music video, directed by Meiert Avis, and produced by Jeremy Alter, was postponed due to legal issues involving censorship, but premiered on September 15, 2010, on iTunes and Vevo.

"Miss Nothing" was released on August 18, 2010, only in the UK and Australia. The music video for "Miss Nothing", directed by Meiert Avis, and produced by Jeremy Alter premiered on July 20, 2010.

"Just Tonight" was released on December 27, 2010, only in the UK after being pushed back from November 9. The music video, directed by Meiert Avis, and produced by Jeremy Alter, premiered on November 2.

== Critical reception ==
Professional ratings
Aggregate scores
Source	Rating
Metacritic	74/100
Review scores
Source	Rating
AllMusic	4/5 stars
Artistdirect	4.5/5 stars
Digital Spy	3/5 stars
Entertainment Weekly	B−
IGN	7.5/10
Kerrang!	3/5
Virgin Media	3/5 stars

Light Me Up received generally positive reviews from music critics. At Metacritic, which assigns a normalized rating out of 100 to reviews from mainstream publications, the album received an average score of 74, based on five reviews. Alexey Eremenko of AllMusic wrote that Taylor Momsen "com[es] across as the strongest and bitchiest female vocalist to front an alt-rock band since Garbage's Shirley Manson" and added, "If the band had explored their bluesy leanings more, Light Me Up could have been a small-scale revolution, but even as it stands now, it's still a wicked good record." Rick Florino of Artistdirect stated that "Momsen's ability to mix a soulful swagger with a heavy metal grit makes for one of the best debuts of 2011", concluding that "The Pretty Reckless strike the most perfect balance between sexy swagger and brilliant songwriting."

At The New York Times, Jon Caramanica described the album as "terrific fun: salacious, convincingly muscular, unnervingly rowdy." Leah Greenblatt of Entertainment Weekly opined that the album is "clearly built from the doll parts of [the] grunge goddesses [of the 1990s]—a sometimes too-slick conceit that Momsen's thousand-Marlboro growl still manages to sell surprisingly well." Virgin Media's Ian Gittins noted that the album is "sparky and vivacious enough to hint that Ms Momsen, should she so wish, may even be able to give up the day job." IGN's Chad Grischow expressed, "Despite some lyrical clumsiness and overbearing production, there is a lot to like about The Pretty Reckless on their debut; enough to leave you hoping they work out the kinks on their sophomore set." John Longbottom of Kerrang! commented, "While lyrically there's nothing explicitly offensive, there are enough risque lines here to raise a few eyebrows, and enough good songs to prick a few ears."

== Commercial performance ==
Light Me Up debuted at number 65 on the Billboard 200, selling 9,000 copies in its first week. As of October 2016, it had sold 132,000 copies in the United States. The album debuted at number six on the UK Albums Chart with 11,916 copies sold in its first week. On January 12, 2018, the album was certified gold by the British Phonographic Industry (BPI), denoting shipments in excess of 100,000 copies.

== Track listing ==
All tracks are written by Taylor Momsen, Ben Phillips, and Kato Khandwala.

European and Australian edition
No.	Title	Length
1.	"My Medicine"	3:14
2.	"Since You're Gone"	2:41
3.	"Make Me Wanna Die"	3:54
4.	"Light Me Up"	3:27
5.	"Just Tonight"	2:48
6.	"Miss Nothing"	3:13
7.	"Goin' Down"	3:35
8.	"Nothing Left to Lose"	4:11
9.	"Factory Girl"	3:31
10.	"You"	3:32
Total length:		34:06

UK iTunes Store edition bonus tracks
No.	Title	Length
11.	"Far from Never" (demo)	3:36
12.	"Everybody Wants Something from Me" (demo)	3:35
13.	"Make Me Wanna Die" (music video)	3:55
14.	"Miss Nothing" (music video)	3:13

Japanese edition bonus tracks
No.	Title	Length
11.	"Zombie"	3:08
12.	"Make Me Wanna Die" (acoustic version)	3:33
13.	"Far from Never"	3:36

North and South American edition
No.	Title	Length
1.	"My Medicine"	3:14
2.	"Since You're Gone"	2:41
3.	"Make Me Wanna Die"	3:54
4.	"Light Me Up"	3:27
5.	"Zombie"	3:08
6.	"Just Tonight"	2:48
7.	"Miss Nothing"	3:13
8.	"Goin' Down"	3:35
9.	"Nothing Left to Lose"	4:11
10.	"You"	3:32
11.	"Factory Girl"	3:31

== Personnel ==
Credits adapted from the liner notes of Light Me Up.

=== The Pretty Reckless ===
- Taylor Momsen – vocals (all tracks); backing vocals ("My Medicine" and "Just Tonight")
- Ben Phillips – guitar (all tracks); backing vocals ("Make Me Wanna Die", "Zombie", and "Goin' Down")
- Jamie Perkins – drums (all except "Zombie" and "You"); percussion ("Zombie")

=== Additional personnel ===
- Kato Khandwala – production, engineering, mixing, guitar (all tracks); bass (all except "You"); programming (all except "Goin' Down"); percussion (all except "Since You're Gone" and "Zombie"); string arrangement ("Make Me Wanna Die", "Just Tonight" and "You")
- Michael "Mitch" Milan – engineering assistance (all except "You")
- James Frazee – engineering assistance (all except "Make Me Wanna Die", "Miss Nothing", "Goin' Down" and "You"); additional engineering ("Factory Girl")
- Jon Cohan – drum tech (all except "You")
- John Bender – backing vocals (all except "My Medicine")
- Dave Eggar – cello ("Make Me Wanna Die" and "You")
- John Dinklage – violin ("Make Me Wanna Die" and "You")
- Dan Korneff – mix engineering ("Make Me Wanna Die")
- David Sonenberg – executive production
- William Derella – executive production
- Robert Fisher – art direction
- Lauren Dukoff – photography

== Charts ==
Chart performance for Light Me Up
Chart (2010–2011)	Peak position
Australian Albums (ARIA)	71
Belgian Heatseekers Albums (Ultratop Flanders)	2
Belgian Heatseekers Albums (Ultratop Wallonia)	1
Canadian Albums (Nielsen SoundScan)	57
French Albums (SNEP)	167
Irish Albums (IRMA)	18
Japanese Albums (Oricon)	48
Scottish Albums (Official Charts)	7
UK Albums (Official Charts)	6
UK Rock & Metal Albums (Official Charts)	1
US Billboard 200	65
US Top Alternative Albums (Billboard)	10
US Top Rock Albums (Billboard)	18

== Certifications ==
Certifications for Light Me Up
Region	Certification	Certified units/sales
United Kingdom (BPI)	Gold	100,000^{‡}
^{‡} Sales+streaming figures based on certification alone.

== Release history ==
Release dates and formats for Light Me Up
Region	Date	Format	Label	Ref.
Australia	August 27, 2010	CD; digital download	Universal	
France	August 30, 2010	Digital download	Universal	
United Kingdom	August 30, 2010	CD; digital download	Polydor	
Germany	August 31, 2010	CD; digital download	Universal	
France	December 6, 2010	CD	Universal	
Canada	February 8, 2011	Digital download	Universal	
United States	February 8, 2011	Digital download	Interscope	
Canada	March 1, 2011	CD	Universal	
Japan	March 2, 2011	CD; digital download	Universal	
United States	April 12, 2011	CD	Interscope	
France	April 18, 2011	Digital download (reissue)	Universal	
