= Taylor Momsen =

American musician and actress (born 1993)

- Momsen performing with the Pretty Reckless in 2026
- Born: Taylor Michel Momsen; July 26, 1993 (age 33); St. Louis, Missouri, U.S.
- Occupations: Singer; songwriter; musician; model; actress
- Years active: 1996–present
- Musical career
- Genres: Hard rock; post-grunge; alternative rock; blues rock
- Instruments: Vocals; guitar
- Labels: Interscope; Razor & Tie; Cooking Vinyl
- Member of: The Pretty Reckless

Taylor Michel Momsen (born July 26, 1993) is an American singer, songwriter, musician, model, and former actress. Since 2009, Momsen has served as the lead vocalist of the American rock band the Pretty Reckless. Prior to her music career, she started off as a child actress. Momsen debuted as Cindy Lou Who in the film How the Grinch Stole Christmas (2000). Some of her other roles include Alexandra Anami in Spy Kids 2: The Island of Lost Dreams (2002), Molly in Underdog (2007), and Jenny Humphrey on The CW's teen drama series Gossip Girl (2007–2010; 2012).

== Early life ==
Taylor Michel Momsen was born in St. Louis, Missouri, on July 26, 1993. Her parents are Michael and Collette Momsen. She also has a younger sister, Sloane Momsen, who is also an actress. The sisters are of partial Russian descent. Momsen was raised Catholic, attending Our Lady of Lourdes Catholic School for elementary school and later Herbert Hoover Middle School in Potomac, Maryland. She also studied dance after-school at the Center of Creative Arts (COCA) in St. Louis. Upon moving to New York City, Momsen attended the Professional Performing Arts School.

== Career ==
=== Acting ===
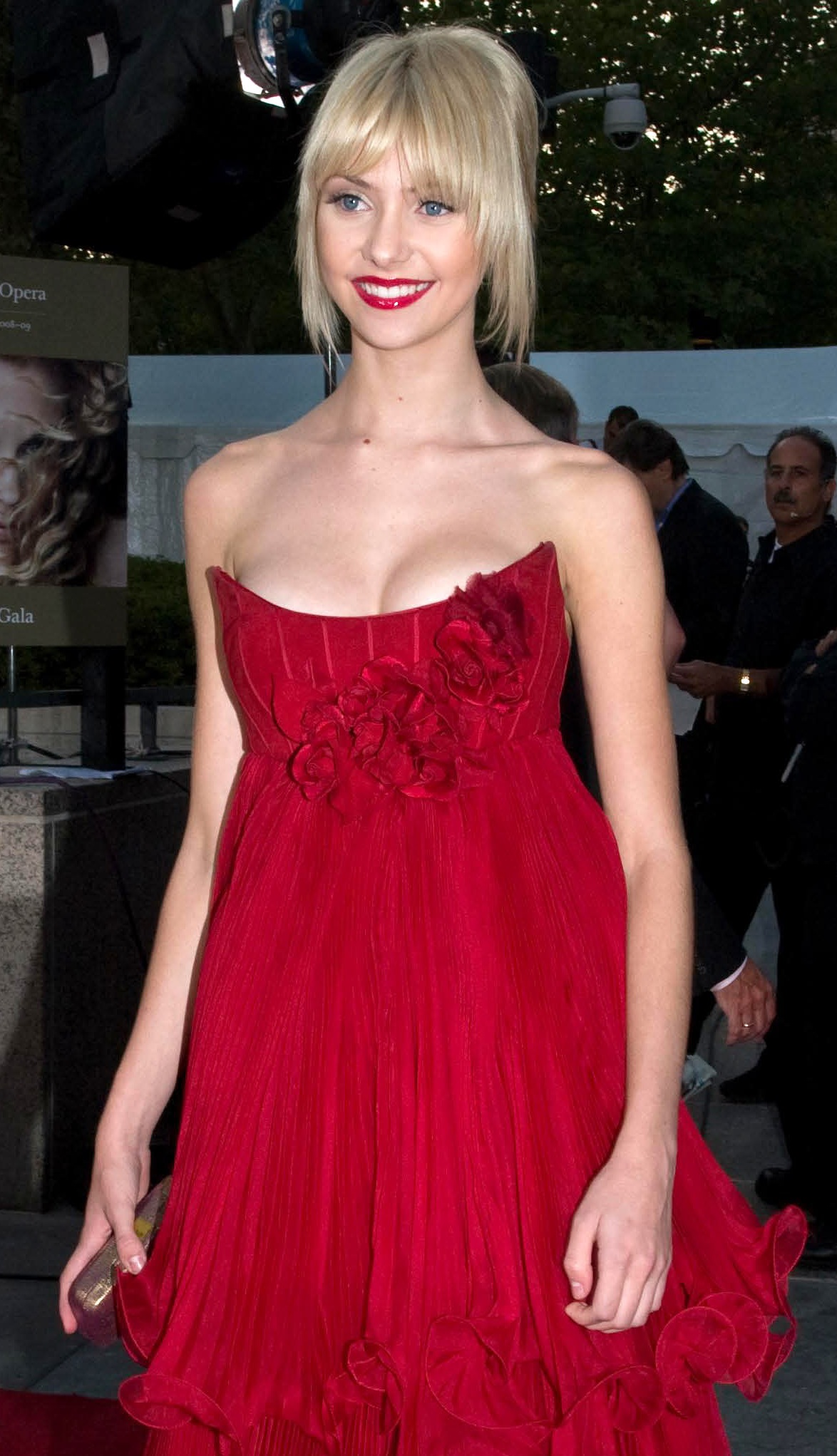
Momsen at the Metropolitan Opera in 2008

She began acting professionally at three years of age in a 1997 national commercial for Shake 'n Bake. She was then cast in The Prophet's Game.

In 2000, Momsen played the role of Cindy Lou Who in Dr. Seuss' How the Grinch Stole Christmas, alongside Jim Carrey, her breakout role. In 2002, she played Gretel in Hansel and Gretel and Alexandra, the President's daughter, in Spy Kids 2: The Island of Lost Dreams. She also starred alongside her younger sister, Sloane Momsen, in We Were Soldiers (2002).

Momsen received a lead role in the WB series Misconceptions, which never aired. After that, she appeared in the 2006 film Saving Shiloh. Momsen also auditioned for the title role in Hannah Montana. She was in the top three actresses for the role; however, the role was instead awarded to Miley Cyrus. Momsen was happy about the decision in retrospect. In 2007, she starred in the Walt Disney Pictures film Underdog as Molly and as Jennifer in the movie Paranoid Park, directed by Gus Van Sant.

Beginning in 2007, she played the character of Jenny Humphrey in The CW television series Gossip Girl, based on the book series by Cecily von Ziegesar. Momsen's appearances on the series became increasingly sporadic; by the end of the first half of the fourth season, she had only appeared in four episodes. It was then announced that the actress would be scheduled for an indefinite hiatus from the show, which ended with her leaving the series as a regular cast member after the completion of the fourth season in 2011. On August 16, 2011, Momsen told Elle magazine that she had quit acting to focus on her music career. On October 16, 2012, it was reported that Momsen would be returning to Gossip Girl for its final episode, in which she appeared briefly in the wedding sequence.

Reflecting on her child acting career, Momsen described it as an "alienating" experience. She detailed bullying she received after her performance in How the Grinch Stole Christmas.

=== Modeling ===
Momsen was signed with Ford Models at a very young age. She noted "My parents signed me up with Ford [Modeling] at the age of two. No two-year-old wants to be working, but I had no choice. My whole life, I was in and out of school. I didn't have friends. I was working constantly and I didn't have a real life."

In June 2008, at the age of 14, Momsen signed to IMG Models. She was the face of British fashion chain New Look for its spring/summer 2010 collection. After weeks of speculation about who would be the face of Madonna's 2010 fashion line "Material Girl", Momsen was announced on July 15, 2010. A week later, Momsen was announced as the model for John Galliano's new women's fragrance, scheduled to launch in autumn 2010. In 2010, she appeared in a video for Galliano's "Parlez-Moi d'Amour" fragrance ad campaign.

Momsen is the face of Samantha Thavasa's handbag line. She has done multiple photoshoots, press events, and commercials.

Momsen appeared on the cover of Page Six Magazine when she was 15 years old in 2009. She also appeared on the February 2010 cover of Seventeen. In October 2010, Momsen wore a pair of platform stilettos, thigh-high stockings, and a holster strapped around her leg for Revolver. She appeared on the cover of FHM's March 2012 edition and FHM ranked Momsen #29 in its 2012 Hot 100 issue. She also had a photo spread and interview for Maxim in the November 2013 issue.

In an interview with music journalist Jason Tanamor, when asked about posing for Playboy, she said, "I was at the mansion last week and took some pictures. Does that count?"

=== Music ===
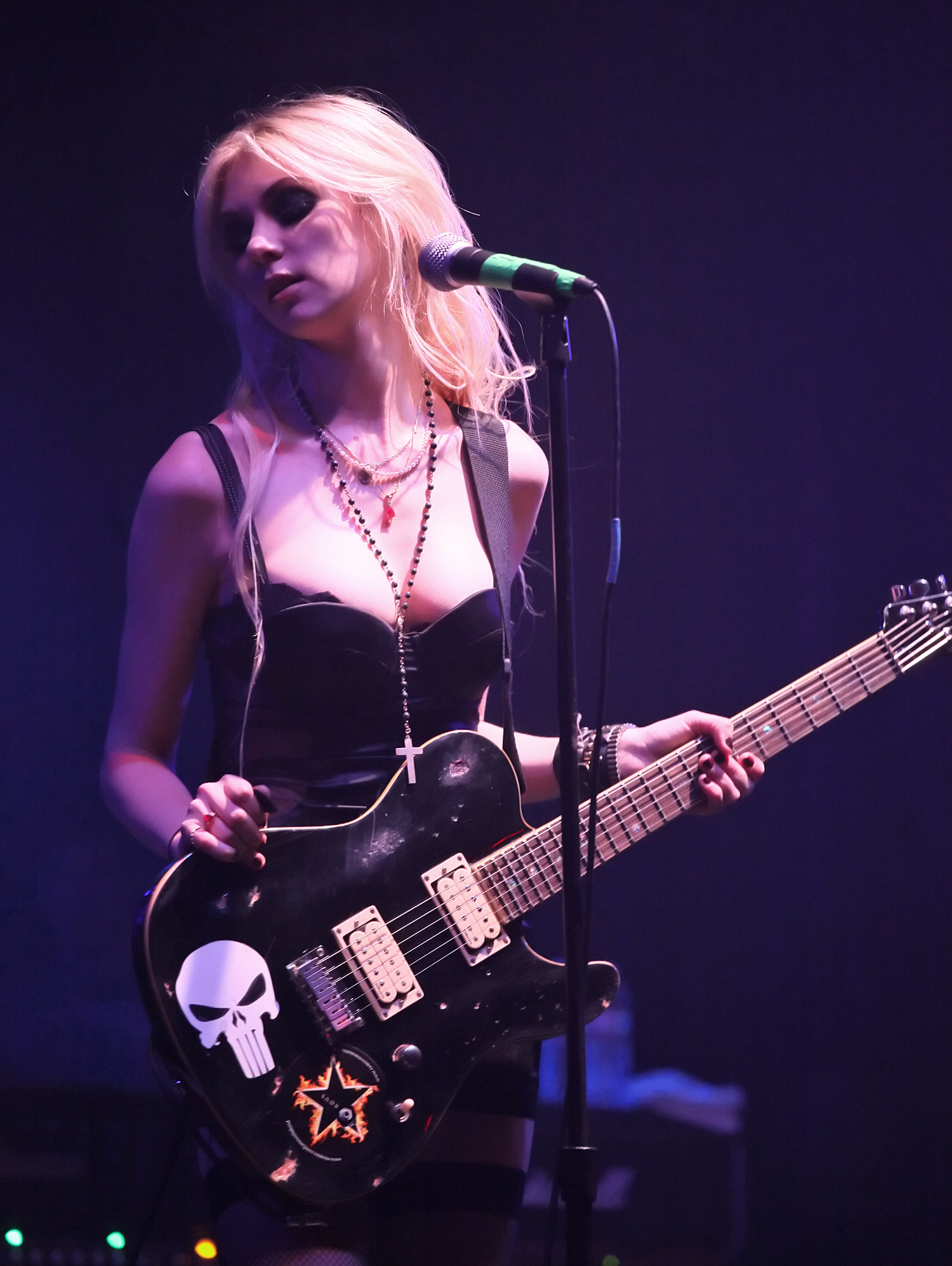
Momsen performing in April 2010

Momsen has said that "music is where I can be me", stating that "acting is easy. I've been doing it for so long and I totally love it. But you're playing a character instead of yourself. Music is more personal because you're writing it and you're involved in every step of it." In 2000, Momsen recorded the song "Where Are You Christmas?" for the soundtrack to How the Grinch Stole Christmas.

In March 2009, Momsen stated in an interview with OK! magazine that her band the Pretty Reckless had signed a deal with Interscope Records. She played her first tour with her band opening for The Veronicas on their Revenge Is Sweeter Tour in spring 2009. Momsen worked with several producers before meeting Kato Khandwala. Khandwala introduced Momsen to guitarist Ben Phillips, and they began writing songs together.

The band released their self-titled EP on June 22, 2010. The band's debut album Light Me Up was released on August 27, 2010 where it debuted at number 6, as well as at number 1 on the Official Rock & Metal Albums Chart. The first single "Make Me Wanna Die" was released on May 30, 2010, while the second single "Miss Nothing" which was released on August 23, 2010. "Just Tonight" was released as the album's third single. Songs from this album have featured in the movie Kick-Ass as well as the television series The Vampire Diaries and Gossip Girl.

Television personality Heidi Montag recorded "Blackout", a song written by Momsen. According to Momsen, she wrote the song when she was 8 years old and recorded it as a demo with a producer. Montag released the song as a digital-only single, with the music video being directed by her husband Spencer Pratt. Momsen commented about the recording: "I'm like, okay, dude, you're singing an 8-year-old's words, but that's cool. It's so funny because I didn't shop it or anything and I get this call going, 'Did you write a song for Heidi Montag'? And I'm like, 'What?'" The track was later included on Montag's debut studio album, Superficial (2010).

On July 27, 2011, Momsen announced that the band would be the supporting act for Evanescence during the fall of 2011. Throughout 2012, Momsen and her band toured North America; the second headlining tour, titled the Medicine Tour, began in March 2012. Momsen also appeared as guest vocalist on ex Ministry member Paul Barker's 2012 album Fix This.

On December 11, 2012, the Pretty Reckless' fourth single "Kill Me" was released on December 11. The track was the last song to be featured in the Gossip Girl series finale.

Momsen cites Kurt Cobain, Chris Cornell, the Beatles, Led Zeppelin, the Who, Pink Floyd, AC/DC, Marilyn Manson, Oasis, and Shirley Manson of Garbage as some of her personal influences.

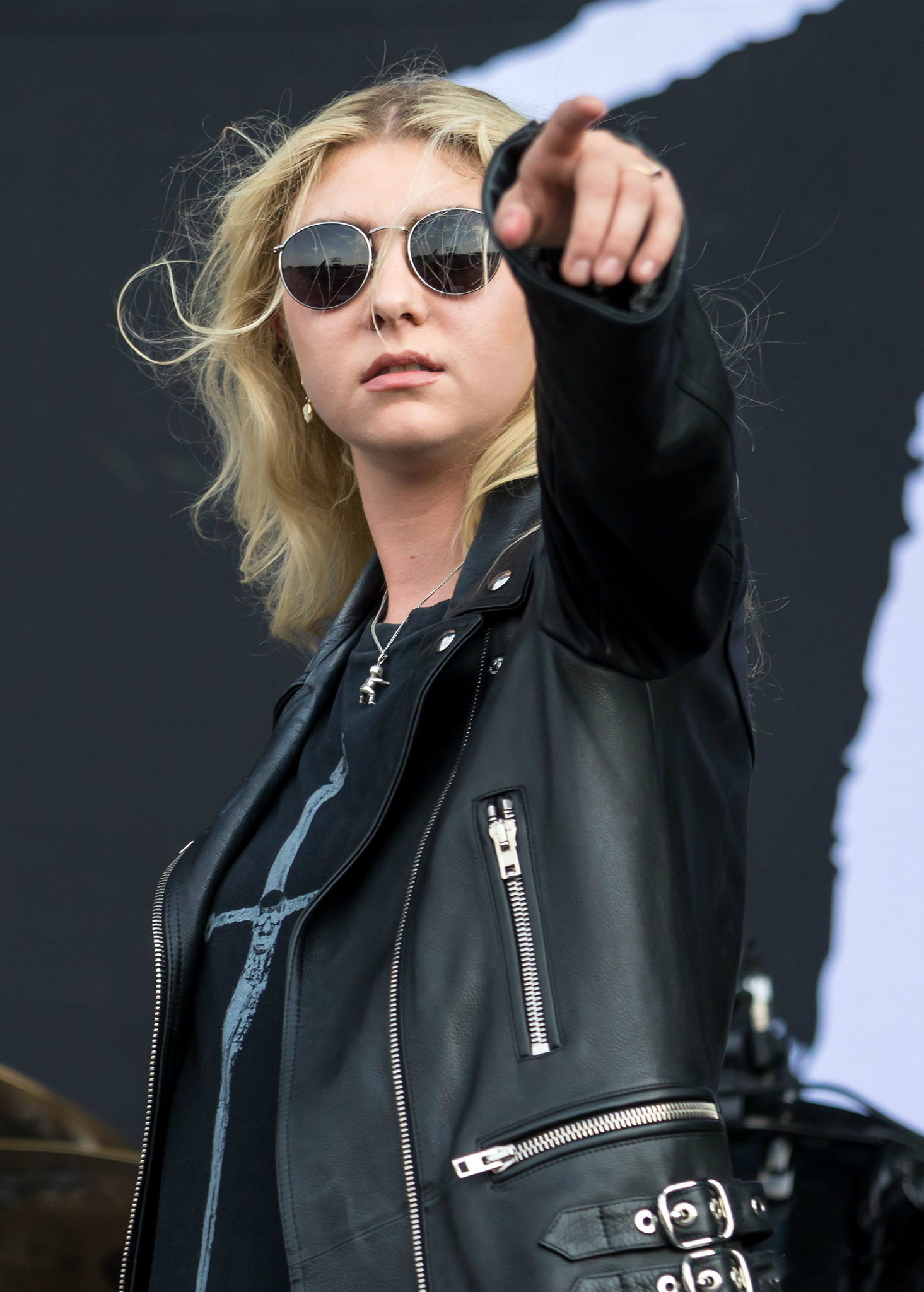
Momsen in 2017

Going to Hell was released on March 12, 2014. The release marked the band's largest sales week to date and landed at number five on the Billboard 200 with over 35,000 copies sold in its first week. The success of the record saw Taylor, along with the rest of the band, break records when they became the first female-fronted band to reach No. 1 on the rock radio charts with its first two singles: "Heaven Knows" in March 2014 and "Fucked Up World" in September 2014. The Pretty Reckless also spent the majority of late 2013 throughout 2014 on tour supporting Going To Hell. In 2014, her band also supported Fall Out Boy in their European leg of the Save Rock n Roll Tour along with New Politics.

Throughout 2015, Momsen continued to record new material for the third Pretty Reckless album. On September 29, 2016, the band released the single "Take Me Down". The third album, Who You Selling For, was released on October 21, 2016.

The Pretty Reckless were the opening act for Soundgarden's final tour in 2017, that wound up cut short with the suicide of Chris Cornell. The remaining members of Soundgarden went on to invite Momsen to perform with them on occasion, first in Cornell's tribute concert I Am The Highway in 2019, followed by the Taylor Hawkins tribute concert in 2022, Soundgarden's induction to the Rock and Roll Hall of Fame in 2025 and the Seattle Seahawks 2026 season opener.. She also recorded with Soundgarden member Matt Cameron a cover of their song "Halfway There". On October 3, 2026, Momsen and Cameron performed Soundgarden songs at the Power to the People Festival, a beneficent event for voter awareness organized by Tom Morello at Merriweather Post Pavilion in Columbia, MD as improptu supergroup "Suns of Soundgarden", also featuring guitarists Morello and Mike McCready, and bassist Robbie Mangano.

In 2020, Momsen was featured on Evanescence's "Use My Voice", a single from the band's album The Bitter Truth, alongside other artists such as American rock vocalist Lzzy Hale from Halestorm, Dutch symphonic metal vocalist Sharon den Adel from Within Temptation, and electronic violinist Lindsey Stirling. Alongside Lzzy Hale of Halestorm, Momsen was featured on In This Moment's cover of "We Will Rock You" by Queen. The cover song was featured on In This Moment's 2020 album Mother.

The Pretty Reckless released their fourth album, Death by Rock and Roll, on February 12, 2021. The Pretty Reckless became the first female-fronted band to have five number one singles when "Death by Rock and Roll" hit number one on the charts.

As The Pretty Reckless started preparing their fifth album in early 2024, AC/DC invited them to be the support act in their Power Up Tour. The band accepted even if it delayed their creative process. Momsen discovered Angus Young himself made the request for her band given he was a fan, and the two became friends during the tour. The tour had Momsen being hospitalized twice, as during the May 31, 2024 concert in Seville, Spain, Momsen was attacked and bitten by a bat while performing on stage, and had to take vaccinations for rabies, and two years later she suffered a venomous spider bite the day before the Mexico City concert on April 9, 2026. The Pretty Reckless worked on the songs during the tour, releasing singles "For I Am Death", "When I Wake Up", "Love Me", and "Dear God". before their fifth studio album, Dear God, was released on June 26, 2026.

In October 2025, she and her band digitally released a Christmas EP titled Taylor Momsen's Pretty Reckless Christmas, including an updated version of the song "Where Are You Christmas" that she originally performed as Cindy Lou Who in How the Grinch Stole Christmas in 2000. The EP's physical release was in November 2025. In November, Momsen performed at the Macy's Thanksgiving Day Parade. During the 2026 MusiCares Person of the Year event honoring Mariah Carey, Momsen performed alongside the Foo Fighters two songs Carey had recorded in her secret rock album Someone's Ugly Daughter.

== Personal life ==
Momsen struggled with depression and substance abuse. Following the deaths of her idol, Soundgarden singer Chris Cornell, with whom she had toured briefly in 2017 but was not close to, and her close friend and longtime record producer Kato Khandwala, in 2017 and 2018, respectively, she isolated herself and fell into depression. Eventually, Momsen used music to deal with the trauma; she wrote the 2021 album Death by Rock and Roll inspired by their deaths.

By October 2016, Momsen had stopped practicing and identifying with Catholicism. She described herself at the time as a spiritual but not religious person.

== Discography ==
The Pretty Reckless studio albums

- Light Me Up (2010)
- Going to Hell (2014)
- Who You Selling For (2016)
- Death by Rock and Roll (2021)
- Dear God (2026)

== Filmography ==
=== Film ===
Year	Title	Role	Ref.
1999	The Prophet's Game	Honey Bee Swan	
2000	How the Grinch Stole Christmas	Cindy Lou Who	
2002	Spy Kids 2: The Island of Lost Dreams	Alexandra Anami	
2002	Hansel & Gretel	Gretel	
2002	We Were Soldiers	Daughter Julie Moore	
2006	Saving Shiloh	Samantha Wallace	
2007	Paranoid Park	Jennifer	
2007	Underdog	Molly	
2008	Spy School	Madison Kramer	

=== Television ===
Year	Title	Role	Notes	Ref.
2007–2010, 2012	Gossip Girl	Jennifer "Jenny" Humphrey	Main cast (seasons 1–4); Special guest star (season 6)	

=== Music videos ===
Year	Title	Artist	Notes	Ref.
2000	"Where Are You Christmas?"	Faith Hill	Cameo	
2014	"L.A. Love (La La)"	Fergie	Cameo	

== Awards and nominations ==
Award	Year	Category	Work	Result	Ref.
Blockbuster Entertainment Award	2001	Favorite Female - Newcomer	How the Grinch Stole Christmas	Nominated	
Saturn Awards	2001	Best Performance by a Younger Actor	How the Grinch Stole Christmas	Nominated	
Teen Choice Award	2008	Choice TV Breakout Star: Female	Gossip Girl	Nominated	
Young Artist Award	2001	Best Performance in a Feature Film – Young Actress Age Ten or Under	How the Grinch Stole Christmas	Nominated	
Young Artist Award	2008	Best Performance in a Feature Film – Supporting Young Actress	Underdog	Nominated	
Young Artist Award	2009	Best Performance in a TV Series (Comedy or Drama) – Leading Young Actress	Gossip Girl	Nominated	
