= Make Me Wanna Die =

2010 single by the Pretty Reckless

Single by the Pretty Reckless

from the album Light Me Up
- B-side: "Zombie"
- Released: May 13, 2010
- Studio: House of Loud (Elmwood Park, New Jersey)
- Genre: Alternative rock; hard rock; post-grunge
- Length: 3:54
- Label: Interscope
- Songwriters: Taylor Momsen; Ben Phillips; Kato Khandwala
- Producer: Kato Khandwala

The Pretty Reckless singles chronology
"Make Me Wanna Die" (2010)	"Miss Nothing" (2010)

Audio sample
- file; help

Music video
- "Make Me Wanna Die" on YouTube

"Make Me Wanna Die" is a song by American rock band the Pretty Reckless from their eponymous debut extended play (2010) and their debut studio album, Light Me Up (2010). The song was written by Taylor Momsen, Ben Phillips, and Kato Khandwala, and produced by the latter. It was released on May 13, 2010, as the lead single from both the EP and the album.

== Background and release ==
"Make Me Wanna Die" was the first song written for Light Me Up. Momsen has described it as a "tragic love song", stating it was "focused on Romeo and Juliet and a passionate love that might've not been appropriate."

== Critical reception ==
Nick Levine of Digital Spy rated "Make Me Wanna Die" four out of five stars, stating the song "is actually a bit of a blast. To be precise, it's a great big slab of angsty grunge-pop with a screechalong chorus, some nice jaggedy guitar riffs and production as glossy/grungey as its singer's peroxide blonde dye job." Chris Roberts of BBC Music felt that the song "packs every emo-romantic cliché into its punchy pat structure".

== Music videos ==
A promotional video for "Make Me Wanna Die", known as the "viral version", was directed by Patrick Dwyer and released on May 11, 2010. The video, shot at the Hotel Chelsea in New York City, features live performance clips and backstage footage of the band.

The official music video, directed by Meiert Avis and Chris LeDoux, was filmed in Brooklyn, New York City, in March 2010. It was produced by Jeremy Alter. Momsen explained the concept of the video to MTV News, saying, "[T]o try and emulate kind of an epic-y song that's almost like a film, it was a challenge to come up with a treatment. So I guess we sort of decided to make it like a death march. You can't live anymore in this world, and you're on your way to your death, and you're seeing everything you're passing, and stripping yourself of your belongings on your way to your grave." According to Momsen, the video was "held up in legal for a long time because I was 16 when we shot that. We couldn't release it because, yes, I actually got naked." The video was ultimately released on September 15, 2010, to the iTunes Store in the US.

== In film and television ==
The track plays during the end credits of the 2010 film Kick-Ass, and is also included on its soundtrack. In August 2010, the song was used in a trailer for the second season of The Vampire Diaries. "Make Me Wanna Die" was featured in the ninth episode of the fourth season of Gossip Girl, "The Witches of Bushwick", which aired on November 5, 2010. It was playing when Jenny (Momsen's character), while impersonating Serena, pulls the curtain down to reveal Blair and Chuck talking together. The track was also used during the opening segment of the 2011 Victoria's Secret Fashion Show. The song also appeared on the March 30, 2017, episode of Supernatural, titled "Ladies Drink Free".

== Track listing ==
- Digital download
1. "Make Me Wanna Die" – 3:54
2. "Zombie" – 3:08

== Credits and personnel ==
Credits adapted from the liner notes of Light Me Up.

The Pretty Reckless

- Taylor Momsen – vocals
- Ben Phillips – guitar, backing vocals
- Jamie Perkins – drums

Additional personnel

- Kato Khandwala – production, engineering, mixing, guitar, bass, percussion, programming, string arrangement
- Dave Eggar – cello
- John Dinklage – violin
- John Bender – backing vocals
- Dan Korneff – mix engineering
- Michael "Mitch" Milan – assistant engineering
- Jon Cohan – drum tech

== Charts ==
Chart performance for "Make Me Wanna Die"
Chart (2010–2011)	Peak position
Australia (ARIA)	61
Europe (European Hot 100 Singles)	57
Scottish Singles Sales (Official Charts)	10
UK Singles (Official Charts)	16
UK Rock & Metal (Official Charts)	1
US Hot Singles Sales (Billboard)	4
US Rock Digital Songs (Billboard)	18

== Certifications ==
Certifications for "Make Me Wanna Die"
Region	Certification	Certified units/sales
Brazil (Pro-Música Brasil)	Gold	30,000^{‡}
New Zealand (RMNZ)	Gold	15,000^{‡}
United Kingdom (BPI)	Silver	200,000^{‡}
^{‡} Sales+streaming figures based on certification alone.

== Release history ==
Release dates and formats for "Make Me Wanna Die"
Region	Date	Format	Label	Ref.
Ireland	May 13, 2010	Digital download	Polydor	
United Kingdom	May 16, 2010	Digital download	Polydor	
Australia	June 11, 2010	Digital download (one track)	Universal	
Australia	July 9, 2010	Digital download (two tracks)	Universal	
