= Kato Khandwala =

American record producer

- Birth name: Suketo Khandwala
- Born: 1970 or 1971
- Died: April 25, 2018 (aged 47); North Hollywood, California, U.S.
- Occupations: Record producer; songwriter; mixer; engineer
- Website: brightmanmusic.com

Suketo Khandwala (1970/1971 – April 25, 2018), known professionally as Kato Khandwala, was an American record producer, songwriter, mixer, and engineer. He worked with many different artists such as Blondie, Paramore, My Chemical Romance, Pop Evil and The Pretty Reckless.

Khandwala died on April 25, 2018, at the age of 47, due to injuries sustained in a motorcycle accident in North Hollywood, Los Angeles.

== Selected discography ==
Artist	Album	Label	Credit	Year
Vimic	Open Your Omen	UM^{e}	Producer	2019
Pop Evil	Pop Evil	eOne	Producer, Mixer, Engineer	2018
The Pretty Reckless	Who You Selling For	Razor and Tie	Producer, engineer, mixer	2016
We Are Harlot	We Are Harlot	Road Runner	Producer, Mixer, Engineer	2015
My Secret Circus	Gusto	Eleven Seven Records	Producer, Mixer, Engineer	2015
Aranda	Not the Same	Wind Up	Producer, Mixer, Engineer	2015
One OK Rock	35xxxv	Wind Up	Mixer	2015
The Pretty Reckless	Going to Hell	Razor and Tie	Producer, engineer, mixer	2014
Oh No Fiasco	No Ones Gotta Know	Eleven Seven Records	Producer, Engineer, Mixer	2013
Blondie	Sunday Girl (2013 Version)	Eleven Seven Records	Producer	2013
Drowning Pool	Resilience	Eleven Seven Records	Engineer, Producer	2013
Pierce the Veil	Collide with the Sky	Fearless Records	Co-Producer	2012
Blondie	Panic of Girls	Eleven Seven Records	Producer, Engineer, Mixer, Writer	2011
Cold	Superfiction	Eleven Seven Records	Producer, Engineer, Co-Writer	2011
Four Year Strong	In Some Way, Shape, or Form	Universal Motown	Engineer	2011
Breaking Benjamin	Shallow Bay: The Best of Breaking Benjamin	Hollywood Records	Digital Editing, Engineer	2011
The Pretty Reckless	Light Me Up	Interscope Records	Producer, engineer, mixer, writer	2010
Crystal Bowersox	Farmers Daughter	Jive Records	Engineer	2010
Papa Roach	Time for Annihilation	Eleven Seven Records	Engineer	2010
Mayday Parade	Anywhere but Here	Atlantic Records	Engineer	2009
All Time Low	Nothing Personal	Hopeless Records	Engineer	2009
Madina Lake	Attics to Eden	Roadrunner Records	Engineer	2009
Breaking Benjamin	Dear Agony	Hollywood Records	Engineer	2009
The Dares	The Dares	Jive Records	Engineer	2009
The Urgency	The Urgency	Mercury Records	Engineer, Additional Production	2008
Morningwood	Sugarbaby	Capitol Records	Producer, Engineer	2008
My Chemical Romance	The Black Parade Is Dead!	Reprise Records	Engineer	2008
Cavo	Bright Nights Dark Days	Reprise Records	Engineer	2008
Course of Nature	Damaged	Silent Majority	Engineer	2008
Hawk Nelson	Hawk Nelson Is My Friend	Tooth & Nail	Engineer	2008
Your Vegas	A Town and Two Cities	Republic Universal	Engineer	2008
Breaking Benjamin	Phobia	Hollywood Records	Engineer	2007
Kids in the Way	A Love/Hate Masquerade	Flicker/Sony	Producer, Co-Writer, Engineer, Mixer	2007
Serena Ryder	Told You in a Whispered Song	Atlantic Records	Engineer	2007
Paramore	Riot!	Fueled by Ramen/Atlantic	Engineer	2007
Hawthorne Heights	If Only You Were Lonely	Victory Records	Engineer	2006
Say When	I'm With the Band	Independent	Producer, Engineer, Mixer	2006
The Red Jumpsuit Apparatus	Don't You Fake It	Virgin Records	Digital editing, engineer	2006
GSX	Manifest	Independent	Engineer, Mixer	2006
Kids in the Way	Apparitions of a Melody	Flicker/Sony	Producer, Co-Writer, Engineer	2005
Bobaflex	Apologize for Nothing	TVT Records	Engineer	2005
Famous	All the Wicked	Burning Records	Producer, Co-Writer, Mixer	2005
Phase 9	For the Sleepless	Burning/Capitol Records	Producer, Co-Writer, Mixer	2005
The Suckers	Dasein	Eggshell Armor Music	Mixer	1999
Eye of the Storm	F2	Independent	Engineer, Producer, Mixer	1998
