= List of songs recorded by Three Days Grace =

Canadian rock band Three Days Grace including Adam Gontier, Neil Sanderson, Brad Walst, Barry Stock and Matt Walst have recorded material for eight studio albums. Apart from their album songs, the band has released several non-album singles, such as a cover of "Somebody That I Used to Know" and "You Don't Get Me High Anymore".

Their debut studio album Three Days Grace was released on July 22, 2003. The album's lead single "I Hate Everything About You" reached number one on the Canadian rock chart. "Just Like You", "Home" and "Wake Up" were also released as singles from the album, the first topped the Billboard Mainstream Rock chart. Their second studio album One-X was released on June 13, 2006, and was preceded by its lead single, "Animal I Have Become". The album also spawned the singles, "Pain", "Never Too Late" and "Riot". They released their third studio album Life Starts Now on September 22, 2009, with "Break" being released as its lead single. The album debuted at number three on the Billboard 200, thus becoming the band's highest-charting album in the US to date. On October 2, 2012, their fourth studio album Transit of Venus was released.

Their fifth studio album Human was released on March 31, 2015. "Painkiller" and "I Am Machine" were released as the first two singles from the album. They released their sixth studio album Outsider on March 9, 2018. The album was preceded by its lead single "The Mountain". Their seventh studio album Explosions was released on May 6, 2022. The album spawned three singles, "So Called Life", "Lifetime" and "I Am the Weapon". Their eighth studio album Alienation was released on August 22, 2025. The album was preceded by its lead single "Mayday", its second single "Apologies", and its third single "Kill Me Fast".

== Tracks ==
Key
†	Indicates single release
•	Indicates non-album single
	Indicates song solely written by member(s) of the band

Song	Artist(s)	Writer(s)	Album(s)	Year	Ref.
"A Scar Is Born"	Three Days Grace	Neil Sanderson; Barry Stock; Brad Walst; Matt Walst; Ted Bruner	Explosions	2022	
"The Abyss"	Three Days Grace	Neil Sanderson; Barry Stock; Brad Walst; Matt Walst; Gavin Brown; Ted Bruner	Outsider	2018	
"Alienation"	Three Days Grace	Adam Gontier; Neil Sanderson; Barry Stock; Brad Walst; Matt Walst; Gavin Brown; Simon Wilcox; Zakk Cervini	Alienation	2025	
"Animal I Have Become" †	Three Days Grace	Adam Gontier; Neil Sanderson; Barry Stock; Brad Walst; Gavin Brown	One-X	2006	
"Anonymous"	Three Days Grace	Adam Gontier; Neil Sanderson; Barry Stock; Brad Walst	Transit of Venus	2012	
"Another Relapse"	Three Days Grace	Adam Gontier; Neil Sanderson; Barry Stock; Brad Walst; Matt Walst; Simon Wilcox; Zakk Cervini	Alienation	2025	
"Apologies" †	Three Days Grace	Adam Gontier; Neil Sanderson; Barry Stock; Brad Walst; Matt Walst; Simon Wilcox; Dan Lancaster; Joe Rickard	Alienation	2025	
"Are You Ready"	Three Days Grace	Adam Gontier; Neil Sanderson; Barry Stock; Brad Walst; Gavin Brown	Three Days Grace	2003	
"Bitter Taste"	Three Days Grace	Adam Gontier; Neil Sanderson; Barry Stock; Brad Walst	Life Starts Now	2009	
"Born Like This"	Three Days Grace	Adam Gontier; Neil Sanderson; Barry Stock; Brad Walst; Gavin Brown	Three Days Grace	2003	
"Break" †	Three Days Grace	Adam Gontier; Neil Sanderson; Barry Stock; Brad Walst	Life Starts Now	2009	
"Broken Glass"	Three Days Grace	Adam Gontier; Neil Sanderson; Barry Stock; Brad Walst	Transit of Venus	2012	
"Bully"	Three Days Grace	Adam Gontier; Neil Sanderson; Barry Stock; Brad Walst	Life Starts Now	2009	
"Burn"	Three Days Grace	Adam Gontier; Neil Sanderson; Barry Stock; Brad Walst; Gavin Brown	Three Days Grace	2003	
"Car Crash"	Three Days Grace	Neil Sanderson; Barry Stock; Brad Walst; Matt Walst; Gavin Brown	Human	2015	
"The Chain" (Note: This a cover of the Fleetwood Mac song.)	Three Days Grace	Lindsey Buckingham; Mick Fleetwood; Christine McVie; John McVie; Stevie Nicks	Lost in You	2011	
"Chain of Abuse"	Three Days Grace	Neil Sanderson; Barry Stock; Brad Walst; Matt Walst; Ted Bruner	Explosions	2022	
"Chalk Outline" †	Three Days Grace	Adam Gontier; Neil Sanderson; Barry Stock; Brad Walst; Craig Wiseman	Transit of Venus	2012	
"Champion"	Three Days Grace	Neil Sanderson; Barry Stock; Brad Walst; Matt Walst; Ted Bruner; James Walst	Explosions	2022	
"Chasing the First Time"	Three Days Grace	Neil Sanderson; Barry Stock; Brad Walst; Matt Walst; Gavin Brown; Johnny Andrews	Outsider	2018	
"Deathwish"	Three Days Grace	Adam Gontier; Neil Sanderson; Barry Stock; Brad Walst; Matt Walst; Zakk Cervini; Drew Fulk	Alienation	2025	
"Dominate"	Three Days Grace	Adam Gontier; Neil Sanderson; Barry Stock; Brad Walst; Matt Walst; Zakk Cervini; Drew Fulk	Alienation	2025	
"Don't Wanna Go Home Tonight" †	Three Days Grace	Adam Gontier; Neil Sanderson; Barry Stock; Brad Walst; Matt Walst; Ted Bruner; Zakk Cervini; Simon Wilcox	Alienation	2025	
"Drown"	Three Days Grace	Adam Gontier; Neil Sanderson; Barry Stock; Brad Walst; Gavin Brown	Three Days Grace	2003	
"The End Is Not the Answer"	Three Days Grace	Neil Sanderson; Barry Stock; Brad Walst; Matt Walst; Gavin Brown	Human	2015	
"Every Other Weekend"	Three Days Grace	Neil Sanderson; Barry Stock; Brad Walst; Matt Walst; Gavin Brown	Human	2015	
"Expectations"	Three Days Grace	Adam Gontier; Neil Sanderson; Barry Stock; Brad Walst; Chris Wallin	Transit of Venus	2012	
"Explosions"	Three Days Grace	Neil Sanderson; Barry Stock; Brad Walst; Matt Walst; Ted Bruner	Explosions	2022	
"Fallen Angel" †	Three Days Grace	Neil Sanderson; Barry Stock; Brad Walst; Matt Walst; Ted Bruner; Christopher Millar; Joey Moi	Human	2015	
"Get Out Alive"	Three Days Grace	Adam Gontier; Neil Sanderson; Barry Stock; Brad Walst	One-X	2006	
"Give In to Me" (Note: This a cover of the Michael Jackson song.)	Three Days Grace	Michael Jackson; Bill Bottrell	Transit of Venus	2012	
"Give Me a Reason"	Three Days Grace	Adam Gontier; Neil Sanderson; Barry Stock; Brad Walst	Transit of Venus	2012	
"Goin' Down"	Three Days Grace	Adam Gontier; Neil Sanderson; Barry Stock; Brad Walst	Life Starts Now	2009	
"The Good Life" †	Three Days Grace	Adam Gontier; Neil Sanderson; Barry Stock; Brad Walst	Life Starts Now	2009	
"Gone Forever"	Three Days Grace	Adam Gontier; Neil Sanderson; Barry Stock; Brad Walst; Gavin Brown	One-X	2006	
"Happiness"	Three Days Grace	Adam Gontier; Neil Sanderson; Barry Stock; Brad Walst	Transit of Venus	2012	
"The High Road" †	Three Days Grace	Adam Gontier; Neil Sanderson; Barry Stock; Brad Walst; Matt Walst; Chris Tompkins	Transit of Venus	2012	
"Home" †	Three Days Grace	Adam Gontier; Neil Sanderson; Barry Stock; Brad Walst; Simon Wilcox	Three Days Grace	2003	
"Human Race" †	Three Days Grace	Neil Sanderson; Barry Stock; Brad Walst; Matt Walst; Gavin Brown	Human	2015	
"I Am an Outsider"	Three Days Grace	Neil Sanderson; Barry Stock; Brad Walst; Matt Walst; Johnny Andrews; Meghan Patrick	Outsider	2018	
"I Am Machine" †	Three Days Grace	Neil Sanderson; Barry Stock; Brad Walst; Matt Walst; Gavin Brown; Johnny Andrews	Human	2015	
"I Am the Weapon" †	Three Days Grace	Neil Sanderson; Barry Stock; Brad Walst; Matt Walst; Ted Bruner; Simon Wilcox	Explosions	2022	
"I Hate Everything About You" †	Three Days Grace	Adam Gontier; Neil Sanderson; Barry Stock; Brad Walst; Matt Walst; Gavin Brown	Three Days Grace	2003	
"Infra-Red" †	Three Days Grace	Neil Sanderson; Barry Stock; Brad Walst; Matt Walst; Isaiah Steinberg; Casey Marshall; Dan Kanter	Outsider	2018	
"In Cold Blood"	Three Days Grace	Adam Gontier; Neil Sanderson; Barry Stock; Brad Walst; Matt Walst; Zakk Cervini; Dan Lancaster	Alienation	2025	
"In Waves"	Three Days Grace	Adam Gontier; Neil Sanderson; Barry Stock; Brad Walst; Matt Walst; Zakk Cervini; Drew Fulk	Alienation	2025	
"It's All Over"	Three Days Grace	Adam Gontier; Neil Sanderson; Barry Stock; Brad Walst	One-X	2006	
"Just Like Wylin'"	Three Days Grace & Bone Crusher	Adam Gontier; Neil Sanderson; Barry Stock; Brad Walst; Gavin Brown; Wayne Hardnett; Vau Shaun Brooks	XXX: State of the Union	2005	
"Just Like You" †	Three Days Grace	Adam Gontier; Neil Sanderson; Barry Stock; Brad Walst; Gavin Brown	Three Days Grace	2003	
"Kill Me Fast" †	Three Days Grace	Adam Gontier; Neil Sanderson; Barry Stock; Brad Walst; Matt Walst; Simon Wilcox; Dan Lancaster; Zakk Cervini	Alienation	2025	
"Landmine"	Three Days Grace	Neil Sanderson; Barry Stock; Brad Walst; Matt Walst; Gavin Brown	Human	2015	
"Last to Know"	Three Days Grace	Adam Gontier; Neil Sanderson; Barry Stock; Brad Walst	Life Starts Now	2009	
"Let It Die"	Three Days Grace	Adam Gontier; Neil Sanderson; Barry Stock; Brad Walst; Gavin Brown	One-X	2006	
"Let You Down"	Three Days Grace	Adam Gontier; Neil Sanderson; Barry Stock; Brad Walst; Matt Walst	Three Days Grace	2003	
"Lifetime" †	Three Days Grace	Neil Sanderson; Barry Stock; Brad Walst; Matt Walst; Ted Bruner	Explosions	2022	
"Life Starts Now"	Three Days Grace	Adam Gontier; Neil Sanderson; Barry Stock; Brad Walst	Life Starts Now	2009	
"Lost in You" †	Three Days Grace	Adam Gontier; Neil Sanderson; Barry Stock; Brad Walst	Life Starts Now	2009	
"Love Me or Leave Me"	Three Days Grace	Neil Sanderson; Barry Stock; Brad Walst; Matt Walst; Gavin Brown	Outsider	2018	
"Mayday" †	Three Days Grace	Adam Gontier; Neil Sanderson; Barry Stock; Brad Walst; Matt Walst; Ted Bruner; Zakk Cervini	Alienation	2025	
"Me Against You"	Three Days Grace	Neil Sanderson; Barry Stock; Brad Walst; Matt Walst; Gavin Brown; Ted Bruner	Outsider	2018	
"Misery Loves My Company" †	Three Days Grace	Adam Gontier; Neil Sanderson; Barry Stock; Brad Walst; Craig Wiseman	Transit of Venus	2012	
"The Mountain" †	Three Days Grace	Neil Sanderson; Barry Stock; Brad Walst; Matt Walst; Johnny Andrews	Outsider	2018	
"Neurotic"	Three Days Grace feat. Lukas Rossi	Neil Sanderson; Barry Stock; Brad Walst; Matt Walst; Ted Bruner; Lukas Rossi	Explosions	2022	
"Never Ordinary"	Three Days Grace feat. Lindsey Stirling	Adam Gontier; Neil Sanderson; Barry Stock; Brad Walst; Matt Walst; Dan Lancaster; Sophie Simmons; Lindsey Stirling	Alienation	2025	
"Never Too Late" †	Three Days Grace	Adam Gontier; Neil Sanderson; Barry Stock; Brad Walst; Gavin Brown	One-X	2006	
"The New Real"	Three Days Grace	Neil Sanderson; Barry Stock; Brad Walst; Matt Walst; Casey Marshall	Outsider	2018	
"No More"	Three Days Grace	Adam Gontier; Neil Sanderson; Barry Stock; Brad Walst	Life Starts Now	2009	
"No Tomorrow"	Three Days Grace	Neil Sanderson; Barry Stock; Brad Walst; Matt Walst; Ted Bruner	Explosions	2022	
"Nothing's Fair in Love and War"	Three Days Grace	Neil Sanderson; Barry Stock; Brad Walst; Matt Walst; Gavin Brown	Human	2015	
"Nothing to Lose but You"	Three Days Grace	Neil Sanderson; Barry Stock; Brad Walst; Matt Walst; Gavin Brown; Johnny Andrews	Outsider	2018	
"Now or Never"	Three Days Grace	Adam Gontier; Neil Sanderson; Barry Stock; Brad Walst; Gavin Brown	Three Days Grace	2003	
"On My Own"	Three Days Grace	Adam Gontier; Neil Sanderson; Barry Stock; Brad Walst; Gavin Brown	One-X	2006	
"One Too Many"	Three Days Grace	Neil Sanderson; Barry Stock; Brad Walst; Matt Walst; Gavin Brown	Human	2015	
"One-X"	Three Days Grace	Adam Gontier; Neil Sanderson; Barry Stock; Brad Walst	One-X	2006	
"Operate"	Three Days Grace	Adam Gontier; Neil Sanderson; Barry Stock; Brad Walst; Matt Walst	Transit of Venus	2012	
"Over and Over"	Three Days Grace	Adam Gontier; Neil Sanderson; Barry Stock; Brad Walst; Gavin Brown	One-X	2006	
"Overrated"	Three Days Grace	Adam Gontier; Neil Sanderson; Barry Stock; Brad Walst; Gavin Brown	Three Days Grace	2003	
"Pain" †	Three Days Grace	Adam Gontier; Neil Sanderson; Barry Stock; Brad Walst; Gavin Brown	One-X	2006	
"Painkiller" †	Three Days Grace	Neil Sanderson; Barry Stock; Brad Walst; Matt Walst; Johnny Andrews; Doug Oliver	Human	2015	
"The Power"	Three Days Grace	Adam Gontier; Neil Sanderson; Barry Stock; Brad Walst; Matt Walst; Ted Bruner; Zakk Cervini; Andrew Goldstein	Alienation	2025	
"Redemption"	Three Days Grace	Neil Sanderson; Barry Stock; Brad Walst; Matt Walst; Ted Bruner; Johnny Andrews	Explosions	2022	
"The Real You"	Three Days Grace	Neil Sanderson; Barry Stock; Brad Walst; Matt Walst; Gavin Brown	Outsider	2018	
"Right Left Wrong" †	Three Days Grace	Neil Sanderson; Barry Stock; Brad Walst; Matt Walst; Gavin Brown	Outsider	2018	
"Running Away"	Three Days Grace	Adam Gontier; Neil Sanderson; Barry Stock; Brad Walst	One-X	2006	
"Scared"	Three Days Grace	Adam Gontier; Neil Sanderson; Barry Stock; Brad Walst; Matt Walst; Gavin Brown	Three Days Grace	2003	
"Sign of the Times"	Three Days Grace	Adam Gontier; Neil Sanderson; Barry Stock; Brad Walst; Jaren Johnson	Transit of Venus	2012	
"So Called Life" †	Three Days Grace	Neil Sanderson; Barry Stock; Brad Walst; Matt Walst; Ted Bruner	Explosions	2022	
"So What"	Three Days Grace	Neil Sanderson; Barry Stock; Brad Walst; Matt Walst; Gavin Brown; Marti Frederiksen; Mark Holman	Human	2015	
"Somebody That I Used to Know" (Note: This a cover of the Gotye song.) •	Three Days Grace	Wally de Backer	Non-album single	2020	
"Someone to Talk To"	Three Days Grace feat. Apocalyptica	Neil Sanderson; Barry Stock; Brad Walst; Matt Walst; Ted Bruner	Explosions	2022	
"Someone Who Cares"	Three Days Grace	Adam Gontier; Neil Sanderson; Barry Stock; Brad Walst	Life Starts Now	2009	
"Souvenirs"	Three Days Grace	Neil Sanderson; Barry Stock; Brad Walst; Matt Walst; Ted Bruner	Explosions	2022	
"Strange Days"	Three Days Grace	Neil Sanderson; Barry Stock; Brad Walst; Matt Walst; Gavin Brown; Johnny Andrews	Outsider	2018	
"Take Me Under"	Three Days Grace	Adam Gontier; Neil Sanderson; Barry Stock; Brad Walst; Gavin Brown	Three Days Grace	2003	
"Tell Me Why"	Three Days Grace	Neil Sanderson; Barry Stock; Brad Walst; Matt Walst; Gavin Brown	Human	2015	
"Time of Dying"	Three Days Grace	Adam Gontier; Neil Sanderson; Barry Stock; Brad Walst	One-X	2006	
"Time That Remains"	Three Days Grace	Adam Gontier; Neil Sanderson; Barry Stock; Brad Walst; Chris Wallin	Transit of Venus	2012	
"Unbreakable Heart"	Three Days Grace	Adam Gontier; Neil Sanderson; Barry Stock; Brad Walst; Rob Hawkins; Chris Tompkins	Transit of Venus	2012	
"Villain I'm Not"	Three Days Grace	Neil Sanderson; Barry Stock; Brad Walst; Matt Walst; Gavin Brown; Johnny Andrews	Outsider	2018	
"Wake Up" †	Three Days Grace	Adam Gontier; Neil Sanderson; Barry Stock; Brad Walst; Simon Wilcox	Three Days Grace	2003	
"Wicked Game" (Note: This a cover of the Chris Isaak song.)	Three Days Grace	Chris Isaak	One-X	2006	
"Without You"	Three Days Grace	Adam Gontier; Neil Sanderson; Barry Stock; Brad Walst	Life Starts Now	2009	
"World So Cold" †	Three Days Grace	Adam Gontier; Neil Sanderson; Barry Stock; Brad Walst	Life Starts Now	2009	
"You Don't Get Me High Anymore" (Note: This a cover of the Phantogram song.) •	Three Days Grace	Ricky Reed; Josh Carter; Sarah Barthel; Dan Wilson; Edwin J. Bocage; Alfred Scramuzza	Non-album single	2016	

== Notes and references ==
Notes
