= Three Days Grace discography =

- Three Days Grace in 2023
- Studio albums: 8
- Extended plays: 4
- Singles: 31
- Video albums: 2
- Music videos: 24
- Promotional singles: 3

Three Days Grace is a Canadian rock band that formed in 1997. They have released eight studio albums, four extended plays, thirty one singles, two video albums, twenty four music videos and three promotional singles. They signed with Jive Records and released three albums on the label between 2003 and 2009 before the label was folded into the RCA Records umbrella in 2011; the band has released music through that label since then.

Their debut studio album Three Days Grace was released on July 22, 2003. The album's lead single "I Hate Everything About You" reached number one on the Canadian rock chart. "Just Like You" was released as the second single, topping the Billboard Mainstream Rock chart, becoming their first number-one hit on the chart.. The album's third single "Home" reached number two on the US Mainstream Rock chart and number 1 on the US Active Rock. "Wake Up" was the fourth single and was released exclusively in Canada, peaking at number 16 on the Canadian rock chart.

Their second studio album One-X was released on June 13, 2006, and was preceded by its lead single, "Animal I Have Become". The album debuted at number two on the Canadian Albums Chart and number five on the Billboard 200. Three more singles followed, "Pain", "Never Too Late", and "Riot". The first three singles from the album topped the US Mainstream Rock chart.

They released their third studio album Life Starts Now on September 22, 2009, with "Break" being released as its lead single. The song topped the US Hot Rock & Alternative Songs for twelve weeks. The album peaked at number two on the Canadian Albums Chart and number three on the Billboard 200. The album had three more singles, "The Good Life", "World So Cold", and "Lost in You". On October 2, 2012, their fourth studio album Transit of Venus was released. Three singles were released from the album, "Chalk Outline", "The High Road", and "Misery Loves My Company". It was originally the last album with original lead singer Adam Gontier, before he rejoined in 2024.

Their fifth studio album Human was released on March 31, 2015. Its first two singles "Painkiller" and "I Am Machine" reached number one on the US Mainstream Rock chart. "Human Race", and "Fallen Angel" were released for radio airplay as well. They released their sixth studio album Outsider on March 9, 2018. The album was preceded by its lead single "The Mountain", "Infra-Red", and "Right Left Wrong". Their seventh studio album Explosions was released on May 6, 2022. The album spawned three singles, "So Called Life", "Lifetime" and "I Am the Weapon". Their eighth studio album Alienation was released on August 22, 2025. The album was preceded by its lead single "Mayday" and second single "Apologies". After the release of the album, its third single "Kill Me Fast", fourth single "Don't Wanna Go Home Tonight" and fifth single "Dominate", were released to radio.

All but one of their singles ("Riot" in 2007) have charted in the top 10 on the Billboard Mainstream Rock Songs chart. In September 2018, "Infra-Red" became their fourteenth song to top the chart, breaking Van Halen's record for most number-one songs on the chart. As of 2026, they have 21 number-one singles on that chart, two behind Shinedown's total of 23. They also have 22 number-one singles under the US Active Rock chart. The band has sold over 10 million albums and singles combined worldwide.

== Albums ==
=== Studio albums ===
List of studio albums, with selected chart positions and certifications
Title	Details	Peak chart positions										Sales	Certifications
Title	Details	CAN	AUS	AUT	BEL	GER	NZ	SCO	SWI	UK	US	Sales	Certifications
Three Days Grace	Released: July 22, 2003; Label: Jive; Formats: CD, LP, digital download	9	47	—	—	—	21	—	—	—	69	CAN: 335,000; US: 1,500,000	MC: Platinum; RIAA: 3× Platinum; RMNZ: Gold
One-X	Released: June 13, 2006; Label: Jive; Formats: CD, LP, digital download	2	—	—	—	—	—	—	—	—	5	CAN: 158,000; US: 1,200,000	MC: 3× Platinum; BPI: Gold; BVMI: Gold; RIAA: 5× Platinum; RMNZ: Gold
Life Starts Now	Released: September 22, 2009; Label: Jive; Formats: CD, LP, digital download	2	77	—	—	—	—	—	—	—	3	World: 1,120,000; US: 500,000	MC: 2× Platinum; RIAA: 5× Platinum
Transit of Venus	Released: October 2, 2012; Label: RCA; Formats: CD, digital download	4	—	—	—	—	—	—	—	—	5	CAN: 40,000; US: 258,000	MC: Gold; RIAA: Gold
Human	Released: March 31, 2015; Label: RCA; Formats: CD, LP, digital download	2	63	—	—	77	34	97	—	104	16	CAN: 40,000; US: 121,000	MC: Gold; RIAA: Gold
Outsider	Released: March 9, 2018; Label: RCA; Formats: CD, LP, digital download	9	49	28	182	36	— (Note: Outsider did not enter the NZ Top 40 Albums Chart, but peaked at number 10 on the NZ Heatseeker Albums Chart.)	96	38	— (Note: Outsider did not enter the UK Albums Chart, but peaked at number 76 on the UK Album Sales chart.)	24		
Explosions	Released: May 6, 2022; Label: RCA; Formats: CD, LP, digital download	30	—	37	—	28	—	92	53	— (Note: Explosions did not enter the UK Albums Chart, but peaked at number 42 on the UK Album Sales chart.)	102	US: 187,000	
Alienation	Released: August 22, 2025; Label: RCA; Formats: CD, LP, digital download	19	—	13	120	46	—	58	48	— (Note: Alienation did not enter the UK Albums Chart, but peaked at number 31 on the UK Album Sales chart.)	38	US: 96,000	
"—" denotes a recording that did not chart or was not released in that territory.

=== Video albums ===
List of video albums, with selected chart positions
Title	Details	Peak chart positions
Title	Details	US Video
Three Days Grace	Released: 2004; Label: Jive; Formats: DVD	8
Live at the Palace 2008	Released: August 19, 2008; Label: Jive; Formats: DVD	5

== Extended plays ==
List of extended plays
Title	Details
Rolling Stone Original: Three Days Grace	Released: July 22, 2003; Label: Zomba; Formats: Digital download
Pain	Released: February 25, 2007; Label: Jive; Formats: CD, digital download
Never Too Late	Released: February 12, 2008; Label: Jive; Formats: Digital download
Lost in You	Released: March 15, 2011; Label: Jive; Formats: Digital download

== Singles ==
List of singles as lead artist, with selected chart positions and certifications, showing year released and album name
Title	Year	Peak chart positions										Certifications	Album
Title	Year	CAN	CAN Rock	AUS	CZE Rock	GER Rock	NZ Hot	UK Rock	US	US Main.	US Rock	Certifications	Album
"I Hate Everything About You"	2003	—	1	22	—	—	—	29	55	4	—	MC: Platinum; BPI: Platinum; BVMI: Gold; IFPI DAN: Gold; RIAA: 9× Platinum; RMNZ: 3× Platinum	Three Days Grace
"Just Like You"	2004	—	22	61	—	—	—	—	55	1	—	MC: Gold; RIAA: 2× Platinum	Three Days Grace
"Home"	2004	—	—	—	—	—	—	—	90	2	—	RIAA: Platinum	Three Days Grace
"Wake Up"	2005	—	16	—	—	—	—	—	—	—	—		Three Days Grace
"Animal I Have Become"	2006	— (Note: "Animal I Have Become" did not enter the Canadian Singles Chart, but peaked at number 29 on the Canadian Radio Airplay chart.)	2	—	—	—	—	23	60	1	—	MC: 2× Platinum; BPI: Platinum; BVMI: Gold; IFPI DAN: Gold; RIAA: 9× Platinum; RMNZ: 2× Platinum	One-X
"Pain"	2006	52	1	—	3	—	—	—	44	1	—	MC: Platinum; RIAA: 4× Platinum; RMNZ: Gold	One-X
"Never Too Late"	2007	30	2	—	—	—	—	—	71	1	—	MC: Platinum; BPI: Silver; RIAA: 6× Platinum; RMNZ: Gold	One-X
"Riot"	2007	65	15	—	—	—	—	—	—	12	—	MC: Platinum; BPI: Silver; RIAA: 4× Platinum; RMNZ: Gold	One-X
"Break"	2009	26	2	—	17	—	—	—	73	1	1	RIAA: 2× Platinum	Life Starts Now
"The Good Life"	2010	52	3	—	—	—	—	—	— (Note: "The Good Life" did not enter the US Billboard Hot 100, but peaked at number 1 on the Bubbling Under Hot 100 Singles chart.)	1	1	RIAA: Platinum	Life Starts Now
"World So Cold"	2010	94	5	—	—	—	—	—	— (Note: "World So Cold" did not enter the US Billboard Hot 100, but peaked at number 14 on the Bubbling Under Hot 100 Singles chart.)	1	3	RIAA: Platinum	Life Starts Now
"Lost in You"	2011	37	4	—	—	—	—	—	— (Note: "Lost in You" did not enter the US Billboard Hot 100, but peaked at number 17 on the Bubbling Under Hot 100 Singles chart.)	7	17	RIAA: Gold	Life Starts Now
"Chalk Outline"	2012	65	2	—	—	—	—	—	— (Note: "Chalk Outline" did not enter the US Billboard Hot 100, but peaked at number 6 on the Bubbling Under Hot 100 Singles chart.)	1	7	MC: Gold; RIAA: Platinum	Transit of Venus
"The High Road"	2013	69	2	—	—	—	—	—	—	1	32	MC: Gold; RIAA: Gold	Transit of Venus
"Misery Loves My Company"	2013	—	38	—	—	—	—	—	—	1	49		Transit of Venus
"Painkiller"	2014	86	6	—	—	—	—	—	—	1	24	MC: Gold; RIAA: Platinum	Human
"I Am Machine"	2014	— (Note: "I Am Machine" did not enter the Canadian Hot 100, but peaked at number 72 on the Canada Digital Songs chart.)	18	—	—	—	—	—	—	1	20	MC: Gold; RIAA: 2× Platinum	Human
"Human Race"	2015	—	31	—	—	—	—	—	—	3	34		Human
"Fallen Angel"	2015	— (Note: "Fallen Angel" did not enter the Canadian Hot 100, but peaked at number 46 on the Canada Digital Songs chart.)	16	—	—	—	—	—	—	6	41	RIAA: Gold	Human
"The Mountain"	2018	—	8	—	8	— (Note: "The Mountain" did not enter the German Rock Singles chart, but peaked at number 5 on the German Alternative Singles chart.)	—	—	—	1	14	MC: Gold; RIAA: Gold	Outsider
"Infra-Red"	2018	—	6	—	4	—	—	—	—	1	31	RIAA: Gold	Outsider
"Right Left Wrong"	2018	—	5	—	—	—	—	—	—	1	25		Outsider
"Somebody That I Used to Know"	2020	—	7	—	6	—	—	—	—	4	— (Note: "Somebody That I Used to Know" did not enter the US Hot Rock & Alternative Songs chart, but peaked at number 16 on the Rock Digital Song Sales chart.)		Non-album single
"So Called Life"	2021	—	7	—	—	2	—	—	—	1	29	RIAA: Gold	Explosions
"Lifetime"	2022	—	13	—	2	—	—	—	—	1	45		Explosions
"I Am the Weapon"	2022	—	44	—	—	—	—	—	—	4	—		Explosions
"Mayday"	2024	— (Note: "Mayday" did not enter the Canadian Hot 100, but peaked at number 10 on the Canada Digital Songs chart.)	1	—	16	— (Note: "Mayday" did not enter the German Rock Singles chart, but peaked at number 1 on the German Alternative Singles chart.)	36	—	— (Note: "Mayday" did not enter the US Billboard Hot 100, but peaked at number 25 on the US Digital Song Sales chart.)	1	20		Alienation
"Apologies"	2025	— (Note: "Apologies" did not enter the Canadian Hot 100, but peaked at number 22 on the Canada Digital Songs chart.)	1	—	—	—	—	—	—	1	35		Alienation
"Kill Me Fast"	2025	—	1	—	—	—	—	—	—	1	45		Alienation
"Don't Wanna Go Home Tonight"	2026	—	1	—	—	—	—	—	—	1	—		Alienation
"Dominate"	2026	—	29	—	14	—	—	—	—	3	—		Alienation
"—" denotes a recording that did not chart or was not released in that territory.

=== Promotional singles ===
List of promotional singles, showing year released and album name
Title	Year	Peak chart positions		Album
Title	Year	US Hard Rock	US Rock	Album
"You Don't Get Me High Anymore"	2016	—	—	Non-album single
"I Am an Outsider"	2018	— (Note: "I Am an Outsider" did not enter the US Hot Hard Rock Songs chart, but peaked at number 6 on the US Hard Rock Digital Song Sales chart.)	47	Outsider
"Neurotic" (featuring Lukas Rossi)	2022	15	—	Explosions
"—" denotes a recording that did not chart or was not released in that territory.

=== Other charted and certified songs ===
List of songs, with selected chart positions, showing year released, album name and certifications.
Title	Year	Peak chart positions		Certifications	Album
Title	Year	US Hard Rock	US Rock Digital	Certifications	Album
"Gone Forever"	2006	—	—	MC: Gold; RIAA: Platinum	One-X
"Time of Dying"	2006	—	—	RIAA: Platinum	One-X
"Get Out Alive"	2006	—	—	RIAA: Platinum	One-X
"It's All Over"	2006	—	—	RIAA: Gold	One-X
"On My Own"	2006	—	—	RIAA: Gold	One-X
"Over and Over"	2006	—	—	RIAA: Gold	One-X
"Let it Die"	2006	—	—	RIAA: Gold	One-X
"The Chain"	2011	— (Note: "The Chain" did not enter the US Hot Hard Rock Songs chart, but peaked at number 11 on the Hard Rock Digital Song Sales chart.)	45		Lost in You
"Redemption"	2022	20	—		Explosions
"—" denotes a recording that did not chart or was not released in that territory.

== Music videos ==
Title	Year	Director(s)	Ref.
"I Hate Everything About You"	2003	Scott Winig	
"Just Like You"	2003	Scott Winig	
"Home"	2004	Dean Karr	
"Animal I Have Become"	2006	Dean Karr	
"Pain"	2006	Tony Petrossian	
"Never Too Late"	2007	Tony Petrossian	
"Break"	2009	P. R. Brown	
"The Good Life"	2010	Michael Maxxis	
"Chalk Outline"	2012	Shane Drake	
"The High Road"	2013	lyric video	
"Misery Loves My Company"	2013	Esther Quenneville, Xavier Collet-Garand	
"I Am Machine"	2014	lyric video	
"Human Race"	2015	Mark Pellington	
"The Mountain"	2018	Sean L. T. Cartwright	
"The Abyss"	2019	Harry Reese	
"Right Left Wrong"	2019	Randy Edwards	
"Somebody That I Used to Know"	2020	Mike Filsinger	
"So Called Life"	2021	Jon Vulpine	
"Lifetime"	2022	Jon Vulpine	
"I Am the Weapon"	2022	from live footage broadcast	
"Mayday"	2024	Circus Head	
"Apologies"	2025	Jose Lun	
"Dominate" (lyric video)	2025	Jose Lun	
"Kill Me Fast"	2025	Jose Lun	
"Kill Me Fast" (live video)	2025	Sanjay Parikh	
"Don't Wanna Go Home Tonight"	2026	Matt Barnes	

== Guest appearances ==
List of non-single guest appearances, with other performing artists, showing year released and album name
Title	Year	Other artist(s)	Album
"Just Like Wylin'"	2005	Bone Crusher	XXX: State of the Union
"Emotions"	2021	Bighead, Yung Booke, Young Thug	Emotions
"Children of Night"	2023	Jonathan Young	Children of Night
