= Don't Wanna Go Home Tonight =

Single by Three Days Grace

from the album Alienation
- Released: May 8, 2026
- Recorded: 2024
- Length: 3:31
- Label: RCA
- Songwriters: Adam Gontier; Neil Sanderson; Barry Stock; Brad Walst; Matt Walst; Ted Bruner; Simon Wilcox; Zakk Cervini
- Producers: Howard Benson; Zakk Cervini

Three Days Grace singles chronology
"Kill Me Fast" (2025)	"Don't Wanna Go Home Tonight" (2026)	"Dominate" (2026)

Music video
- "Don't Wanna Go Home Tonight" on YouTube

"Don't Wanna Go Home Tonight" is a song by Canadian rock band Three Days Grace. It was released for radio airplay on May 8, 2026, as the fourth single from Alienation. The song peaked at number one on the Canada Mainstream Rock chart. It also reached numbers one and five on the US Mainstream Rock Airplay and US Rock Airplay charts, respectively.

== Background ==
"Don't Wanna Go Home Tonight" was written about the band's nostalgia for their teenage years, growing up in Norwood, Ontario, an ode to their hometown. Matt Walst said, "It just brings me back to when I was younger and didn't have so much worry or responsibility, and not caring what tomorrow brought [...] We write about all sorts of things that we're going through or what we see around us, and it's all from a real place." According to bassist Brad Walst, the idea was originally thought of by lead guitarist Barry Stock, who referred to "1979" by The Smashing Pumpkins as inspiration.

== Composition ==
"Don't Wanna Go Home Tonight" was written by Adam Gontier, Neil Sanderson, Barry Stock, Brad Walst, Matt Walst, Ted Bruner, Simon Wilcox and Zakk Cervini, while production was handled by Howard Benson and Zakk Cervini.

== Music video ==
The music video for "Don't Wanna Go Home Tonight" was filmed in Norwood, Ontario, in May 2026. Directed by Matt Barnes and produced by Natalie D'Urbano, the video premiered on June 11, 2026.

The video pays direct homage to the band's roots, having been filmed on location in their hometown of Asphodel-Norwood, Ontario. It features appearances from the band's actual friends and family, capturing the localized, close-knit sentiment expressed in the lyrics. On June 18, 2026, the band also released behind-the-scenes footage detailing the creation of the video and their homecoming experience.

== Chart performance ==
"Don't Wanna Go Home Tonight" peaked at number one on the Canada Mainstream Rock chart. In the United States, the song peaked at number one on the Mainstream Rock Airplay, making it the bands 21st number-one on the chart, and number five on the Rock Airplay chart. Additionally, it reached number one on the Active Rock chart, becoming their 22nd number-one single on that radio format chart.

== Personnel ==
Credits adapted from the album's liner notes.

Three Days Grace

- Adam Gontier – vocals
- Matt Walst – vocals
- Barry Stock – guitar
- Brad Walst – bass guitar, backing vocals
- Neil Sanderson – drums, keyboards, backing vocals

Additional personnel

- Howard Benson – producer, vocal production
- Zakk Cervini – producer, mixing, composition
- Ted Jensen – mastering (Sterling Sound, Nashville, Tennessee)
- Joe Rickard – vocal production assistance
- Chris Dawson – additional production support
- Paul DeCarli – additional editing
- William Donica – guitar tech
- Julian Gargiulo – engineering, mixing assistantance
- Trevor Gilchrist – bass tech
- Adam Haggerty – bass recording, drum recording
- Hatsukazu "Hatch" Inagaki – additional editing
- Alex Krotz – bass recording, drum recording, drum editing
- Jordan Kulp – additional drum editing
- Junichi Murakawa – guitar recording assistance
- Mike Plotnikoff – guitar recording
- Colin Snortland – drum tech

== Charts ==
Chart performance for "Don't Wanna Go Home Tonight"
Chart (2026)	Peak position
Canada Mainstream Rock (Billboard Canada)	1
Canada Modern Rock (Billboard Canada)	39
US Rock & Alternative Airplay (Billboard)	5

== Release history ==
Release dates and formats for "Don't Wanna Go Home Tonight"
Region	Date	Format	Label	Ref.
Canada	May 8, 2026	Rock radio	RCA	
