= Norwood District High School =

Location
- 44 Elm Street; Norwood, Ontario, K0L 2V0; Canada; 44.38282°N 77.97195°W

Information
- School type: Public High School
- School board: Kawartha Pine Ridge District School Board
- Principal: Cathleen Martherus
- Grades: 9 to 12
- Enrollment: 252 (2020)
- Language: English
- Colours: Blue and Gold
- Mascot: Norwood Knight "Sir Winsalot"
- Team name: Knights
- Website: www.norwoodhigh.kprdsb.ca

Norwood District High School is located at 44 Elm Street in Norwood, Ontario, Canada. As of 2020 it has 21 teachers. It is a member of the Kawartha Pine Ridge District School Board.

== Notable alumni ==
- International rock-stars Adam Gontier, Neil Sanderson, Brad Walst and Matt Walst of the band Three Days Grace

== See also ==
- Education in Ontario
- List of secondary schools in Ontario
