= Kill Me Fast =

Single by Three Days Grace

from the album Alienation
- Released: October 17, 2025
- Recorded: 2024
- Genre: Post-grunge; hard rock
- Length: 3:17
- Label: RCA
- Songwriters: Adam Gontier; Neil Sanderson; Barry Stock; Brad Walst; Matt Walst; Dan Lancaster; Simon Wilcox; Zakk Cervini
- Producers: Howard Benson; Dan Lancaster; Zakk Cervini

Three Days Grace singles chronology
"Apologies" (2025)	"Kill Me Fast" (2025)	"Don't Wanna Go Home Tonight" (2026)

Music video
- "Kill Me Fast" on YouTube

"Kill Me Fast" is a song by Canadian rock band Three Days Grace. It was first released on July 25, 2025, via RCA Records as the second promotional single from their eighth studio album, Alienation. The song was issued to radio on October 17, 2025, as the album's third official single. It is the band's 20th number-one song on Billboard's Mainstream Rock Airplay chart and their 21st number-one song on Mediabase's Active Rock chart.

== Background and recording ==
Singer Adam Gontier said the song is about letting go of someone who is already halfway out the door: "It's about ripping the Band-Aid off [...] That moment when silence hurts more than the truth, and you're begging for the cut just to stop the bleeding." During a writing session at Franklin, Tennessee, bassist Brad Walst and lead guitarist Barry Stock were jamming on acoustic guitars when Walst started playing the riff to "Kill Me Fast". Stock felt that they needed a song like "Never Too Late" on the album and suggested they work on the song.

== Composition and lyrics ==
"Kill Me Fast" was written by Adam Gontier, Neil Sanderson, Barry Stock, Brad Walst, Matt Walst, Dan Lancaster, Simon Wilcox and Zakk Cervini, while production was handled by Howard Benson, Lancaster and Cervini. While writing the song, the group described the moment as something "special," particularly the pre-chorus, which Matt Walst stated gives him "goosebumps... it really resonates." Gontier and Walst have cited that part being their favourite moment on the album. Gontier wrote the song when his wife was diagnosed with a life-threatening illness, which led to him questioning mortality. The line, "If you're planning to go, just don't leave any hope that you're ever coming back," represented how he was feeling at that moment, according to Gontier.

Musically, bassist Brad Walst said the track was a bit like their old sound, noting that the vibe was similar to it. Musically, Billboard described the track as "a power that comes from both the playing and the exchange between the two vocalists."

== Chart performance ==
"Kill Me Fast" first charted on the US Hot Hard Rock Songs chart, peaking at number 13, for the week ending August 9, 2025. After it was serviced to radio, the song debuted at number 37 on the US Mainstream Rock Airplay chart, before peaking at number one. The song became their 20th number-one single on the chart, placing the group second for the most No. 1s in the Mainstream Rock Airplay chart. It's their first song since "I Am Machine" to remain number one for six weeks in a row on the chart. It also peaked at number four on the US Rock & Alternative Airplay chart. The song topped the Canada Mainstream Rock, becoming their third straight number one on the chart.

== Music video ==
On the release day of the song, an animated music video premiered via Vevo and was directed by Josh Lun. A live music video for the song was released on October 15, 2025, directed by Sanjay Parikh. The video was filmed on the road while the group was on tour during the summer.

== Track listing ==
Digital download
No.	Title	Length
1.	"Kill Me Fast"	3:17
2.	"Dominate"	3:14
3.	"Apologies"	3:06
4.	"Mayday"	3:23

== Personnel ==
Credits for "Kill Me Fast" retrieved from Tidal.

Three Days Grace

- Adam Gontier – lead vocals
- Neil Sanderson – drums, backing vocals, keyboards, programming
- Brad Walst – bass guitar, backing vocals
- Barry Stock – guitar
- Matt Walst – lead vocals

Production

- Howard Benson – producer
- Dan Lancaster – producer
- Zakk Cervini – producer, mixing
- Mike Plotnikoff – audio engineer
- Alex Kortz – audio engineer, digital editing
- Adam Haggerty – audio engineer
- Hatsukazu "Hatch" Inagaki – digital editing
- Paul DeCarli – digital editing
- Julian Gargiulo – assistant mixing
- Joe Rickard – assistant engineer
- Junichi Murakawa – assistant engineer
- Ted Jensen – mastering

== Charts ==
Chart performance for "Kill Me Fast"
Chart (2025–2026)	Peak position
Canada Mainstream Rock (Billboard Canada)	1
US Hot Rock & Alternative Songs (Billboard)	45
US Rock & Alternative Airplay (Billboard)	4

== Release history ==
Release dates and formats for "Kill Me Fast"
Region	Date	Format	Label	Ref.
Various	July 25, 2025	Digital download	RCA	
United States	October 17, 2025	Rock radio	RCA	
