= I Am the Weapon (song) =

Single by Three Days Grace

from the album Explosions
- Released: September 27, 2022
- Genre: Alternative metal
- Length: 2:55
- Label: RCA
- Songwriters: Matt Walst; Brad Walst; Barry Stock; Neil Sanderson; Simon Wilcox
- Producer: Howard Benson

Three Days Grace singles chronology
"Lifetime" (2022)	"I Am the Weapon" (2022)	"Mayday" (2024)

Music video
- "I Am the Weapon" on YouTube

"I Am the Weapon" is a song by Canadian rock band Three Days Grace. It was released on September 27, 2022 as the third single from the band's seventh studio album Explosions, and their last single to be released as a quartet, as founding vocalist Adam Gontier rejoined Three Days Grace in 2024, with Walst remaining in the band as well. The song peaked at number four on the Billboard Mainstream Rock chart. It was the 28th most-played song on rock radio in 2023.

== Background and composition ==
"I Am the Weapon" was written by Matt Walst, Brad Walst, Barry Stock, Neil Sanderson and Simon Wilcox while production was handled by Howard Benson. The song is about "the notion of youth being stolen from generations below ours." Lead singer Matt Walst stated,

"Kids aren't getting to live the way that they should be. Brad [Walst] seeing his kids going through that compared to when we were kids; it would be very hard to not be able to hang out with your friends and it's psychologically damaging, what this pandemic has put people through."

The track runs at 119 BPM and is in the key of C minor.

== Music video ==
The music video for "I Am the Weapon" was released on November 8, 2022. The music video contains footage of the group performing live during their "Explosions Tour".

== Personnel ==
Three Days Grace

- Matt Walst – lead vocals, rhythm guitar
- Barry Stock – lead guitar
- Brad Walst – bass guitar
- Neil Sanderson – drums, backing vocals

Production

- Howard Benson – producer
- Simon Wilcox – composer

== Charts ==
=== Weekly charts ===
Weekly chart performance for "I Am the Weapon"
Chart (2022–23)	Peak position
Canada Rock (Billboard)	44
US Rock & Alternative Airplay (Billboard)	18

=== Year-end charts ===
Year-end chart performance for "I Am the Weapon"
Chart (2023)	Position
US Mainstream Rock (Billboard)	24

== Release history ==
Release history and formats for "I Am the Weapon"
Region	Date	Format	Label	Ref.
United States	September 27, 2022	Active rock	RCA	
