= I Am an Outsider =

Promotional single by Three Days Grace

from the album Outsider
- Released: February 16, 2018
- Genre: Alternative rock; hard rock
- Length: 2:43
- Label: RCA
- Songwriters: Barry Stock; Neil Sanderson; Matt Walst; Brad Walst; Gavin Brown; Johnny Andrews; Meghan Patrick
- Producers: Howard Benson; Brown

Audio video
- "I Am an Outsider" on YouTube

"I Am an Outsider" is a song by Canadian rock band Three Days Grace. It was released as a promotional single from their sixth studio album Outsider on February 16, 2018.

== Composition and lyrics ==
"I Am an Outsider" was written by Barry Stock, Neil Sanderson, Matt Walst, Brad Walst, Gavin Brown, Johnny Andrews and Meghan Patrick while production was handled by Howard Benson and Brown. The song is about, "deciding that you don't want to be exposed to so many influences in your life and to people who have a negative influence on you." The group wrote the song as they have previously written songs about being the odd person out and being comfortable with that.

In an interview with Billboard, drummer Neil Sanderson stated:

"You want to be able to take a great big step backwards and view all the chaos and absurdity from a distance – 'I don't want to believe the same way, the same things you to just to sort of conform to anything. I want to have my own set of thoughts and my own set of feelings.' We've always kind of felt like that, I think."

The song has been described as one of the group's more aggressive tracks, blending in heavy synth work and electronic music.

== Critical reception ==
Joshua Leep of Salute gave a positive review for the track stating, "It has raw, passionate vocals, driving guitar riffs, and a rhythm section that will flatten anyone to the floor." He also praised the songs lyrics that give a "message of strength and hope."

== Chart performance ==
"I Am an Outsider" debuted at number 47 on the US Hot Rock & Alternative Songs chart. On the US Hard Rock Digital Song Sales chart, the song peaked at number six.

== Personnel ==
Credits retrieved from album's liner notes.

Three Days Grace

- Matt Walst – lead vocals, rhythm guitar
- Brad Walst – bass guitar
- Barry Stock – lead guitar
- Neil Sanderson – drums, backing vocals

Production

- Ted Jensen – mastering
- Chris Lord-Alge – mixing
- Nik Karpen – assistant mixing engineer
- Jill Zimmermann – assistant engineering
- Darren Magierowski – assistant engineering
- Adam Chagnon – engineering
- Mike Plotnikoff – engineering
- Rhys Fulber – programming
- Paul DeCarli – editing

== Charts ==
Chart performance for "I Am an Outsider"
Chart (2018)	Peak position
US Hot Rock & Alternative Songs (Billboard)	47
