= Apologies (song) =

Single by Three Days Grace

from the album Alienation
- Released: May 9, 2025
- Recorded: 2024
- Genre: Pop rock; alternative metal; post-grunge
- Length: 3:06
- Label: RCA
- Songwriters: Adam Gontier; Matt Walst; Brad Walst; Barry Stock; Neil Sanderson; Dan Lancaster; Joe Rickard; Simon Wilcox
- Producers: Zakk Cervini; Dan Lancaster; Howard Benson

Three Days Grace singles chronology
"Mayday" (2024)	"Apologies" (2025)	"Kill Me Fast" (2025)

Music video
- "Apologies" on YouTube

"Apologies" is a song by Canadian rock band Three Days Grace. It was released on May 9, 2025, via RCA Records as the second single from their eighth studio album, Alienation. The song topped the Canada and US Mainstream Rock charts. It was the 17th most-played song on rock radio in 2025.

== Background ==
The band previewed "Apologies" on their social media pages ahead of the song's release. Following announcement for their eighth studio album, Alienation, the group also released "Apologies" on May 9, 2025, as the album's second single. The song is about "a mirror for anyone who feels like they're too far gone to be loved. How it hurts more knowing someone did love you – just not enough to save you from yourself. Apologies don't rewind time," as explained by drummer Neil Sanderson.

One of the more darker songs from the album, Adam Gontier who has struggled with addiction in the past, said the song describes a feeling everybody has experienced, stating, "Some nights, it's tough, and in some days, you've got to get through it and just look to the good and get through the tough times."

== Composition ==
"Apologies" has been described by critics as a pop rock, and an alternative metal song. It was written by Adam Gontier, Matt Walst, Brad Walst, Barry Stock, Neil Sanderson, Dan Lancaster, Joe Rickard and Simon Wilcox, while production was handled by Lancaster, Howard Benson and Zakk Cervini. The song is described as "classic 2000s rock vibe," with Gontier and Walst trading verses and harmonizing in the song's chorus. Lyrically, the song is a reflection to those who feel are beyond redemption and express the pain of unrequited love. Musically, Gontier noted that the song had a "different vibe" to it, leaning into a more modern and pop sound. Sanderson also said the original version of the track was "pitched up a lot higher," but decided to change the key to fit the band's style.

== Critical reception ==
Loudwire listed "Apologies" as one of the "51 Best Rock & Metal Songs of 2025", writing, "While it doesn't share much sonic DNA with lead single 'Mayday', it's powerful and catchy in its own regard, inflected with pop and electronic flavors, melodic vocal harmonies and big choruses. It actually doesn't sound like much of anything Three Days Grace have released in the past, which is a testament to their willingness to keep pushing the edges of their sound and taking risks."

=== Accolades ===
Publication	Country	Accolade	Year	Rank
Loudwire	United States	13 Best Rock Songs of 2025	2025	9

== Chart performance ==
"Apologies" topped the Canada Mainstream Rock chart for the week ending July 19, 2025. It also reached number one on the US Mainstream Rock chart, earning the group their nineteenth No. 1 song on the chart, placing them second behind Shinedown, who holds the most of all time with twenty. The song peaked at number 10 on the US Alternative Airplay chart, becoming their highest position since "The High Road", which reached number 24 in 2013.

== Music video ==
The music video for "Apologies" premiered on May 9, 2025, the same day that the single was released. The video was directed by Jose Lun.

== Personnel ==
Credits for "Apologies" adapted from digital liner notes.

Three Days Grace

- Adam Gontier – vocals
- Matt Walst – vocals
- Barry Stock – guitar
- Brad Walst – bass guitar, backing vocals
- Neil Sanderson – drums, keyboards, backing vocals

Production

- Howard Benson – producer, vocal production
- Dan Lancaster – producer
- Zakk Cervini – producer, mixing
- Ted Jensen – mastering
- Simon Wilcox – songwriter
- Julian Gargiulo – assistant engineer
- Hatch Inagaki – editing engineer
- Paul DeCarli – editing engineer
- Joe Rickard – assistant engineer
- Adam Haggerty – recording engineer
- Alex Krotz – editing engineer, recording engineer
- Mike Plotnikoff – recording engineer

== Charts ==
=== Weekly charts ===
Weekly chart performance for "Apologies"
Chart (2025)	Peak position
Canada Digital Song Sales (Billboard)	22
Canada Mainstream Rock (Billboard Canada)	1
US Hot Rock & Alternative Songs (Billboard)	35
US Rock & Alternative Airplay (Billboard)	7

=== Year-end charts ===
Year-end chart performance for "Apologies"
Chart (2025)	Position
Canada Mainstream Rock (Billboard)	9
US Rock & Alternative Airplay (Billboard)	29

== Release history ==
Release dates and formats for "Apologies"
Region	Date	Format	Label	Ref.
Various	May 9, 2025	Digital download	RCA	
Canada	May 9, 2025	Rock radio	RCA	
