= Neurotic (song) =

Promotional single by Three Days Grace

from the album Explosions
- Released: February 17, 2022
- Recorded: 2021
- Genre: Grunge; electronic rock
- Length: 3:17
- Label: RCA
- Songwriters: Neil Sanderson; Lukas Rossi
- Producer: Howard Benson

Lyric video
- "Neurotic" on YouTube

"Neurotic" is a song by Canadian rock band Three Days Grace. The song was released on February 17, 2022 as a promotional single from their seventh studio album, Explosions and features guest vocals from Lukas Rossi.

== Background and composition ==
"Neurotic" is a song about, "always looking over your shoulder trying to outrun your demons." Drummer Neil Sanderson stated, "Everything is about tension and release. ["Neurotic"] defines the record."

The track was originally recorded by King City, a project started by Sanderson and vocalist Lukas Rossi of Rock Star Supernova. The group later re-worked on the track and according to Matt Walst, wanted to add "a Three Days Grace spin to it." Sanderson's added, "Lukas has a great voice, and we match up pretty well."

== Critical reception ==
Ricky Aarons of Wall of Sound stated, "Instrumentally, signature Three Days Grace elements and tuning kick straight in. Vocalist Matt Walst has really found his feet vocally in this band... Rossi adds a 90s/00s grungy rock vocal feature, leading to a crescendo chorus from Three Days Grace." Conor of Rock N' Loud remarked, "'Neurotic' eases you in with a more electro style with keyboards and mixer before it explodes when the chorus hits as crunching riffs come in over the top with Walst's vocals giving it a massive lift, a seriously infectious mix of electro and metal."

== Track listing ==
Digital download

No.	Title	Length
1.	"Neurotic" (featuring Lukas Rossi)	4:21
2.	"So Called Life"	3:26

== Personnel ==
Credits for "Neurotic" retrieved from album's liner notes.

Three Days Grace

- Matt Walst – lead vocals, rhythm guitar
- Barry Stock – lead guitar
- Brad Walst – bass guitar
- Neil Sanderson – drums, backing vocals, piano

Additional musicians

- Lukas Rossi – guest vocals

Production

- Howard Benson – producer

== Charts ==
Chart performance for "Neurotic"
Chart (2022)	Peak position
US Hot Hard Rock Songs (Billboard)	15

== Release history ==
Release history for "Neurotic"
Region	Date	Format	Label	Ref.
Various	February 17, 2022	Digital download	RCA	
