= Just Like You (Three Days Grace song) =

2004 single by Three Days Grace

Single by Three Days Grace

from the album Three Days Grace
- B-side: "Let You Down"
- Released: March 29, 2004
- Genre: Alternative rock; nu metal
- Length: 3:08
- Label: Jive
- Songwriters: Adam Gontier; Gavin Brown
- Producer: Gavin Brown

Three Days Grace singles chronology
"I Hate Everything About You" (2003)	"Just Like You" (2004)	"Home" (2004)

Music video
- "Just Like You" on YouTube

Professional ratings
Review scores
Source	Rating
AllMusic	2.5/5 stars

"Just Like You" is a song by the Canadian rock band Three Days Grace. It was released on March 29, 2004, as the second single from their debut studio album. The song reached the top 30 on the Radio & Records Canadian rock chart. It also became their first number-one hit on the U.S. Billboard Modern Rock Tracks and Hot Mainstream Rock Tracks charts in August 2004.

== Background and meaning ==
Adam Gontier reflected on the meaning behind "Just Like You"; he said:

"It's about being told how to live your life. When we were growing up, we saw it sort of first hand. A lot of our friends were pushed into doing jobs their parents were telling them to do. It's about being pushed around and told how to live your life and standing up for yourself."

According to the sheet music published at Musicnotes.com, by Alfred Music Publishing, the track runs at 88 BPM and is in the key of A minor. Gontier's range in the song spans from the notes A4 to G5.

The song earned a nomination at the 2005 Radio Music Awards for Song of the Year: Rock Radio. In May 2006, the single won a BDS Spin Award based on the 200,000 spins it received. A mash up to the song called, "Just Like Wylin'" was released in 2005 with American rapper Bone Crusher. The song was featured in the XXX: State of the Union soundtrack.

== Chart performance ==
"Just Like You" peaked at number 22 on the Canadian rock chart published by Radio & Records. The song also topped both the U.S. Billboard Modern Rock Tracks and Hot Mainstream Rock Tracks charts in August 2004, becoming their first number-one hit in the country. Despite peaking at number one on both charts, it still did not capture the popularity and pop radio success of their prior single, "I Hate Everything About You", which had peaked at numbers two and number four, respectively, but overall having more airplay on mainstream rock, active rock, and modern rock radio stations than "Just Like You". However, both songs peaked at the same position (number 55) on the Billboard Hot 100 chart.

== Music video ==
The original music video for "Just Like You" was shot in Toronto, Ontario in September 2003 and was supposed to be released later that month. The video was directed by Kurt St. Thomas and was shot in black and white without using black and white film. Speaking about the original concept of the video, drummer Neil Sanderson stated, "It's a schizophrenic theme. This girl has this doppelganger, this evil twin kinda thing, which represents schizophrenia, and we see the girl wrestling with herself. She arguing with herself in her own head."

However, the original concept was scrapped and the band recorded a different version of the video. The official music video for "Just Like You" was directed by Scott Winig and was released on April 5, 2004. The video features the band playing behind a two-way mirror and shows statue-like people wearing jumpsuits and identical looking masks covering their entire faces, making everyone look like one another. It is the first music video to feature Barry Stock performing with the band.

== Track listing ==
All tracks are written by Three Days Grace and Gavin Brown, except "Let You Down" written by Three Days Grace, Gavin Brown and Matt Walst.

US promo single
No.	Title	Length
1.	"Just Like You"	3:06

UK promo single
No.	Title	Length
1.	"Just Like You"	3:10

CD single
No.	Title	Length
1.	"Just Like You"	3:06
2.	"Let You Down"	3:44
3.	"I Hate Everything About You" (acoustic version)	3:42

== Personnel ==
Personnel for "Just Like You" are adapted from the album's liner notes.

Three Days Grace

- Adam Gontier – lead vocals, guitars
- Brad Walst – bass guitar
- Neil Sanderson – drums, backing vocals

Production

- Gavin "Golden" Brown – producer
- Ted Jensen – mastering
- Michael "Elvis" Baskette – engineer
- Krisjan Leslie – engineer
- Rich Costey – mixing
- Dave Holdredge – editing
- Mark Kiczula – assistant engineer
- Mike Lapierre – assistant engineer
- Darren Mora – assistant engineer
- Damien Shannon – assistant engineer
- Alley Trela – assistant engineer
- German Villacorta – assistant engineer

== Charts ==
=== Weekly charts ===
Weekly chart performance for "Just Like You"
Chart (2004)	Peak position
Australia (ARIA)	61
Canada Rock Top 30 (Radio & Records)	22
US Billboard Hot 100	55
US Alternative Airplay (Billboard)	1
US Mainstream Rock (Billboard)	1

=== Year-end charts ===
2004 year-end chart performance for "Just Like You"
Chart (2004)	Position
Brazil Airplay (Crowley)	134
US Mainstream Rock Tracks (Billboard)	4
US Modern Rock Tracks (Billboard)	3

2005 year-end chart performance for "Just Like You"
Chart (2005)	Position
US Rock Top 30 (Radio & Records)	12

== Certifications ==
Certifications for "Just Like You"
Region	Certification	Certified units/sales
Canada (Music Canada)	Gold	40,000^{‡}
United States (RIAA)	2× Platinum	2,000,000^{‡}
^{‡} Sales+streaming figures based on certification alone.

== Release history ==
Release dates and formats for "Just Like You"
Region	Date	Format(s)	Label(s)	Ref(s).
United States	March 29, 2004	Mainstream rock; active rock; alternative radio	Jive	
Australia	July 19, 2004	CD single	Jive	

== See also ==
- "Way Away", a 2003 song by Yellowcard with the music video has similar premise.
- "Time Stands Still", a 2003 song by The All-American Rejects with the music video has similar premise.
