= Wake Up (Three Days Grace song) =

Single by Three Days Grace

from the album Three Days Grace
- Released: January 10, 2005
- Length: 3:25
- Label: Jive
- Songwriters: Adam Gontier; Neil Sanderson; Brad Walst; Gavin Brown; Simon Wilcox
- Producer: Gavin Brown

Three Days Grace singles chronology
"Home" (2004)	"Wake Up" (2005)	"Animal I Have Become" (2006)

Audio video
- "Wake Up" on YouTube

"Wake Up" is a song by the Canadian rock band Three Days Grace, from their debut studio album Three Days Grace. The song was released on January 10, 2005, as the fourth and final single from the album. It was released exclusively in Canada. The radio edit version changes the original line, "you're not drunk enough to fuck" to "you're just not drunk enough to talk."

== Background ==
"Wake Up" is a moderately slow tempo power ballad, about a plea for a second chance. During an interview, lead singer Adam Gontier explained the meaning behind the song, "We kind of wrote that song together as a band. The other guys in the band have gone through quite a few relationships, and I've been through a couple. Really that song's just about wanting to get a second chance at a relationship that has gone pretty bad." According to the sheet music published at Musicnotes.com, by Alfred Music Publishing, the track runs at 77 BPM and is in the key of A Major. Gontier's range in the song spans from the notes D4 to A5.

The band performed an acoustic version of the song on MTV in May 2004. The acoustic version was included in their Rolling Stone Original EP and a live version was included in their Three Days Grace DVD album.

== Critical reception ==
On AXS.com's "Top 10 Best Three Days Grace Songs" list, writer Patricia Jones stated, "Instrumentally this song is beautiful. The melodies are well orchestrated and the heavy guitar help balance out the lightness of the rest, but it's the lyrics that cause some conflict." She praised the song for being an "easy" and "entrenching" track and how "the lyrics are in sharp contrast to the ease of the music."

== Chart performance ==
"Wake Up" debuted at number 30 on the Radio & Records Canada Rock Top 30, before peaking at number 16. The song spent a total of 18 weeks, before dropping to number 27 in its final week on the chart.

== Personnel ==
Three Days Grace

- Adam Gontier – lead vocals, guitars
- Brad Walst – bass guitar
- Neil Sanderson – drums, backing vocals

Production

- Michael Baskette – engineer
- Jay Baumgardner – mixing
- Gavin Brown – producer
- Mark Kiczula – assistant engineer
- George Marino – mastering
- Darren Mora – assistant engineer
- Mike Lapierre – assistant engineer
- Krisjan Leslie – additional engineer
- Damien Shannon – assistant engineer
- Alley Trela – assistant engineer
- German Villacorta – assistant engineer

== Charts ==
Chart performance for "Wake Up"
Chart (2004)	Peak position
Canada Rock Top 30 (Radio & Records)	16

== Release history ==
Release dates and formats for "Wake Up"
Region	Date	Format(s)	Label(s)	Ref(s).
Canada	January 10, 2005	Mainstream rock; active rock	Jive	
