= Mayday (Three Days Grace song) =

Single by Three Days Grace

from the album Alienation
- Released: November 22, 2024
- Recorded: 2024
- Genre: Alternative rock
- Length: 3:23
- Label: RCA
- Songwriters: Adam Gontier; Matt Walst; Brad Walst; Barry Stock; Neil Sanderson; Ted Bruner; Zakk Cervini
- Producers: Zakk Cervini; Dan Lancaster; Howard Benson

Three Days Grace singles chronology
"I Am the Weapon" (2022)	"Mayday" (2024)	"Apologies" (2025)

Music video
- "Mayday" on YouTube

"Mayday" is a song by Canadian rock band Three Days Grace. It was released on November 22, 2024, via RCA Records as the lead single from their eighth studio album, Alienation. The song marks the return of vocalist Adam Gontier, who returned to the group in October 2024, after an 11-year absence, with Gontier now sharing lead vocal duties with Matt Walst. It was the 7th most-played song on rock radio in 2025.

== Background ==
On October 2, 2024, the band revealed via social media that they were in the studio with founding frontman Adam Gontier teasing a possibility of new music in the works. Gontier had left the band in January 2013. The following day, they officially announced that Gontier had returned to the band full-time, with Matt Walst remaining a lead vocalist as well, making them a quintet for the first time since their 90s genesis as Groundswell. On November 18, the group teased a new single posting a clip on social media with the caption "Our time of arrival is Friday, November 22nd." On November 20, the band announced the release of a new single, titled "Mayday", which was released on November 22, 2024.

The song is about "the current state of the world" of disillusionment, exhaustion, and denial, and refusing to accept defeat by keeping on moving forward. Matt Walst said of the song's inspiration, "Sometimes life is turbulent, but beyond the clouds is blue skies. So, just keep going."

Released as the album's lead single, Gontier said the song was a "good representation" of the material for Alienation. Drummer Neil Sanderson explained the decision to release the song as its lead single stating, "it made sense and it created a new depth for this band."

== Composition ==
"Mayday" was written by Adam Gontier, Matt Walst, Brad Walst, Barry Stock, Neil Sanderson, Ted Bruner and Zakk Cervini. The track was produced by Sanderson, Cervini, Dan Lancaster and Howard Benson. It was one of the first songs written for the album. The opening bass line is reminiscent of their 2006 single "Animal I Have Become" from their second studio album, One-X, with screamed vocals from Walst in the beginning of the song. The track is described as alternative rock with a melodic chorus, before leading into a heavier breakdown during the bridge.

== Critical reception ==
Gregory Adams of Revolver stated, "Sonically, Three Days Grace's latest single lean into a melodically-bruising modern rock aesthetic, with both singers on high alert as they take stock of the waking world." Chad Childers of Loudwire remarked, "The new song 'Mayday' kicks off with a killer bass line before Matt Walst's screams and some more electronic backing blow up the intensity."

== Chart performance ==
"Mayday" peaked at number one on the Canada Mainstream Rock chart. The song spent ten weeks at number one. It also reached number 20 on the US Hot Rock & Alternative Songs chart, as well as number one on the Mainstream Rock chart, becoming their eighteenth number-one song on the chart. The song peaked at number one and two on the US Hard Rock Digital Song Sales and Digital Song Sales chart, respectively. The song was ranked at number one on the 2025 Billboard Canada Mainstream Rock year-end chart.

== Awards and nominations ==
Awards and nominations for "Mayday"
Year	Organization	Award	Result	Ref(s)
2026	SOCAN Music Awards	SOCAN No. 1 Song Award	Won	

== Music video ==
The music video for "Mayday" premiered on November 22, 2024. It was directed by Circus Head, and the video's premise is the group in an airplane and mid-way through the video, chaos erupts after they fly through a lightning storm, causing heavy turbulence and panic. In an interview with WRIF, drummer Neil Sanderson spoke about the concept of the video stating, "so, yeah, complete melee goes on on the plane. And it's kind of an analogy to just feeling like we're hurling through life at warp speed, and sometimes it doesn't feel like there is a pilot that's in control of things. But it's also a bit of a celebration, like, 'Hey, if we're going down, we're all going down together.'"

== Personnel ==
Credits for "Mayday" adapted from digital liner notes.

Three Days Grace

- Adam Gontier – vocals
- Matt Walst – vocals
- Barry Stock – guitar
- Brad Walst – bass guitar, backing vocals
- Neil Sanderson – drums, keyboards, backing vocals

Production

- Howard Benson – producer, vocal production
- Dan Lancaster – producer
- Zakk Cervini – producer, mixing
- Ted Jensen – mastering
- Julian Gargiulo – assistant engineer
- Hatch Inagaki – editing engineer
- Paul DeCarli – editing engineer
- Joe Rickard – assistant engineer
- Adam Haggerty – recording engineer
- Alex Krotz – editing engineer, recording engineer
- Mike Plotnikoff – recording engineer

== Charts ==
=== Weekly charts ===
Weekly chart performance for "Mayday"
Chart (2024–25)	Peak position
Canada Digital Song Sales (Billboard)	10
Canada Mainstream Rock (Billboard Canada)	1
Czech Republic Rock (IFPI)	16
Germany Airplay (TopHit)	57
German Alternative Singles (GfK)	1
Italy Rock Airplay (FIMI)	23
New Zealand Hot Singles (RMNZ)	36
US Digital Song Sales (Billboard)	25
US Hot Rock & Alternative Songs (Billboard)	20
US Rock & Alternative Airplay (Billboard)	2

=== Year-end charts ===
Year-end chart performance for "Mayday"
Chart (2025)	Position
Canada Rock (Billboard)	1
US Hot Hard Rock Songs (Billboard)	14
US Mainstream Rock (Billboard)	1
US Rock Airplay (Billboard)	12

== Release history ==
Release history and formats for "Mayday"
Region	Date	Format	Label	Ref.
Italy	November 21, 2024	Contemporary hit radio	Sony	
Various	November 22, 2024	Digital download	RCA	
United States	November 22, 2024	Rock radio	RCA	
