= Lifetime (Three Days Grace song) =

Single by Three Days Grace

from the album Explosions
- Released: April 11, 2022
- Genre: Rock
- Length: 2:56
- Label: RCA
- Songwriters: Three Days Grace; Ted Bruner
- Producer: Howard Benson

Three Days Grace singles chronology
"So Called Life" (2021)	"Lifetime" (2022)	"I Am the Weapon" (2022)

Music video
- "Lifetime" on YouTube

"Lifetime" is a song recorded by Canadian rock band Three Days Grace for their seventh studio album, Explosions. It was released on April 11, 2022, as the second single. The song was the 18th most-played song on rock radio in 2022.

== Background and meaning ==
The band explained the message behind "Lifetime".

"Lifetime is about loss. It also speaks to the human condition to push forward and put one foot in front of the other even when you wake up and your world is turned upside down. To see it all with our own eyes and to meet some of the families while overwhelming at times it was also a reminder to us and hopefully to all of you that while there is suffering there is also hope, resilience and strength around every corner all over the world."

Guitarist Barry Stock lived in the Mayfield, Kentucky area when the tornado struck. The band also let fans know how they can donate to a Mayfield tornado relief GoFundMe campaign as well as funding that can assist Mayfield Independent School District Students. The band is also donating a $1 from every ticket sold on their US tour to these organizations as well.

== Music video ==
The music video for "Lifetime" was directed by Jon Vulpine. Filmed in Mayfield, Kentucky, the song was dedicated to the people affected by an EF4 tornado that hit the city in December 2021. The video shows lead singer Matt Walst walking through the city streets, where trees have been severed, vehicles destroyed, houses demolished and very little was left standing. Some clips show the outcome with the local rescue shelter filled with animals that were also displaced after the tornado.

== Chart performance ==
"Lifetime" peaked at number one on the Billboard Mainstream Rock chart tied with Shinedown with 17 number one songs on the chart and at number 8 on the Rock Airplay chart. The song also peaked at number 18 on the Alternative Digital Song Sales chart. It entered the Canada Rock chart at number 49 and peaked at number 13. The song earned 580,000 official US streams and sold 500 downloads.

== Charts ==
=== Weekly charts ===
Weekly chart performance for "Lifetime"
Chart (2022)	Peak position
Canada Rock (Billboard)	13
Czech Republic Rock (IFPI)	2
US Hot Rock & Alternative Songs (Billboard)	45
US Rock & Alternative Airplay (Billboard)	8

=== Year-end charts ===
Year-end chart performance for "Lifetime"
Chart (2022)	Position
Canada Active Rock (Mediabase)	25
US Rock Airplay (Billboard)	36
