= Home (Three Days Grace song) =

2004 single by Three Days Grace

Single by Three Days Grace

from the album Three Days Grace
- Released: October 4, 2004
- Length: 4:21
- Label: Jive
- Songwriters: Adam Gontier; Gavin Brown; Simon Wilcox
- Producer: Gavin Brown

Three Days Grace singles chronology
"Just Like You" (2004)	"Home" (2004)	"Wake Up" (2005)

Music video
- "Home" on YouTube

"Home" is a song by the Canadian rock band Three Days Grace. It was released on October 4, 2004, as the third single from their self-titled debut album (2003) via Jive Records. The song peaked at number 90 on the Billboard Hot 100 and was certified platinum by the Recording Industry Association of America (RIAA) in 2025.

== Background and release ==
In December 2003, drummer Neil Sanderson confirmed that "Home" would be released as the album Three Days Grace's next single, however, Three Days Grace released "Just Like You" as the second single. The song was eventually released as the third single from the album on October 4. Speaking with MTV, Sanderson explained the song's meaning and said, "It's about being pushed around and neglected and feeling like even though you're in the company of other people, they're not really there at all."

Lead vocalist Adam Gontier stated that "Home" was his favorite song from Three Days Grace: "['Home'] hits a spot with me. It's a fun song to play live as well. It's tough to pick a favorite, but because of the amount of energy we give it live, I'd say it's 'Home.'"

It was nominated for Song of the Year: Alternative/Active Rock Radio at the 2005 Radio Music Awards and won a BDS Spin Award based on the 100,000 spins it received in September 2005. A promotional CD featuring the song and an interview with the band was included as a bonus with the Lords of EverQuest strategy guide published by Prima Games in 2003.

== Composition ==
"Home" was written by Gontier and was produced by Gavin Brown. According to the sheet music published at Musicnotes.com, by Alfred Music Publishing, the track runs at 84 BPM and is in the key of D minor. Gontier explained how the song came together in an interview with Ultimate Guitar.

"We wrote 'Home' and it had a pretty heavy opening riff. And I think between us and Gavin, our producer, I think we decided that we wanted some kind of melody that was done with the guitar, over the top of the opening riff because it needed something. Basically, we'd just mess around in the studio with different ideas, different lead parts that might sound cool. And what ended up happening, was that high-pitch guitar lead that you hear at the beginning of 'Home'."

== Music video ==
The original promotional video was shot as a montage of the band playing on tour accompanied by the song. It held little to no success and was not charted on MuchMusic's Countdown due to its low rotation.

The second and more familiar video, directed by Dean Karr was released in October 2004. It was shot in Hamilton, Ontario at the then-abandoned Lister Block in September 2004. Speaking about the music video, Sanderson stated, "We did it in this asbestos-filled condemned building, and my lungs haven't been the same since. The video is pretty wild. There's a creature haunting this house that we're playing in, and there are a lot of metaphoric images that relate directly back to the lyrics." The video reached number one on the MuchMusic Countdown.

== Track listing ==
All tracks are written by Three Days Grace, Gavin Brown and Simon Wilcox.

Canada CD single
No.	Title	Length
1.	"Home"	4:20

US CD single
No.	Title	Length
1.	"Home" (edit)	3:59
2.	"Home" (album version)	4:21

== Personnel ==
Personnel for "Home" are adapted from the album's liner notes.

Three Days Grace

- Adam Gontier – lead vocals, guitars
- Brad Walst – bass guitar
- Neil Sanderson – drums, backing vocals

Production

- Gavin "Golden" Brown – production
- George Marino – mastering
- Michael "Elvis" Baskette – engineering
- Krisjan Leslie – engineer
- Randy Staub – mixing
- Dave Holdredge – editing
- Mark Kiczula – assistant engineering
- Mike Lapierre – assistant engineering
- Darren Mora – assistant engineering
- Damien Shannon – assistant engineering
- Alley Trela – assistant engineering
- German Villacorta – assistant engineering

== Charts ==
=== Weekly charts ===
Weekly chart performance for "Home"
Chart (2004–2005)	Peak position
US Billboard Hot 100	90
US Alternative Airplay (Billboard)	7
US Mainstream Rock (Billboard)	2

=== Year-end charts ===
Year-end chart performance for "Home"
Chart (2005)	Position
US Mainstream Rock Tracks (Billboard)	8
US Modern Rock Tracks (Billboard)	23

== Certifications ==
Certifications for "Home"
Region	Certification	Certified units/sales
United States (RIAA)	Platinum	1,000,000^{‡}
^{‡} Sales+streaming figures based on certification alone.

== Release history ==
Release dates and formats for "Home"
Region	Date	Format(s)	Label(s)	Ref(s).
United States	October 4, 2004	Mainstream rock; active rock; alternative radio	Jive	
Canada	October 28, 2004	CD single	Jive	
