= I Hate Everything About You =

2003 single by Three Days Grace

Single by Three Days Grace

from the album Three Days Grace
- B-side: "Burn"; "Are You Ready"
- Released: April 28, 2003
- Studio: Long View Farm (North Brookfield, Massachusetts); Bearsville (Woodstock, New York); Vespa, A Room Full of Stuff (Toronto, Ontario)
- Genre: Post-grunge; alternative metal; nu metal
- Length: 3:51
- Label: Jive
- Songwriter: Adam Gontier
- Producer: Gavin Brown

Three Days Grace singles chronology
| "I Hate Everything About You" (2003) | "Just Like You" (2004) |

Music video
- "I Hate Everything About You" on YouTube

"I Hate Everything About You" is a song by the Canadian rock band Three Days Grace from their first album Three Days Grace. The song was released on April 28, 2003, as their debut single. The song became a top-five rock hit in both Canada and the United States, and it entered the top 30 in Australia. In June 2025, the song passed one billion streams on Spotify, making Three Days Grace the second Canadian band to have a song achieve this milestone, after Magic! with their 2013 song "Rude".

== Background ==
Written by Three Days Grace lead vocalist Adam Gontier and produced by Gavin Brown, the theme of "I Hate Everything About You" deals with love-hate relationships. Gontier said of the track:

The song is pretty blunt you know? It's to the point. It's about realizing there's something in your life you're wasting time on. I think everybody, even in this band and a lot of other people have felt that way before at one point or another in their life. Whether it's a person, a relationship whatever it is, you're just wasting time on it. The song is a realization of that.

The song is also about dependence and negative influences, as Gontier stated in a 2006 interview with the Arkansas Times:

At that point in my life, and our lives, it was representative of us. It's funny, different people relate to that song on their own levels and own ways. A lot of people saw it as a relationship song, and a lot of people saw it just basically that there is something in your life that you don't need there anymore.

Brown and the band created a demo album, which they gave to EMIMusic Publishing Canada. The record label wanted to hear more material, and with Brown producing, the band created the song "I Hate Everything About You", which attracted the interest of several record labels. Jive Records' Michael Tedesco brought the track to Warren Christensen at management company Q Prime, which ultimately led to the group signing with the label. Christensen recalled thinking that the song was "perfect for rock radio."

According to the sheet music published at Musicnotes.com, by Alfred Music Publishing, the track runs at 168 BPM and is in the key of F minor. Gontier's range in the song spans from the notes C#4 to B5.

== Music ==
Guitar World described the track as "brawny [and] brooding". According to Houston Press, the song "basically goes just like it sounds: angsty, whiny, and angsty again."

The band recorded two guitar parts for the song, the main guitar part and intro riff. The opening riff was recorded on a Yamaha acoustic through an Amp Farm and the group liked the way it sounded with the acoustic guitar and ended up using it on the final production.

== Critical reception ==
Professional ratings
Review scores
| Source | Rating |
|---|---|
| AllMusic | 2.5/5 stars |

"I Hate Everything About You" was met with positive reviews from music critics. Heather Phares of AllMusic called the song "one of the better alt-metal/modern rock singles in recent memory". She stated, "At first, the song seems almost stupidly simple, both lyrically and musically. However, the controlled fury of the choruses and the ambivalent verses make the song a surprisingly smart and concise anthem for anyone stuck in a baffling relationship." She also added, "I Hate Everything About You's frustrated explosions and passive-aggressive recriminations eerily simulate the trajectory of an ill-fated couple." Dave Doray of IGN praised the guitar licks that complement with Gontier's vocals. Kaj Roth of Melodic called the track "a typical fave song for many modern rockers". Issy Herring of Distorted Sound called the lyrics "timelessly relatable" for any Three Days Grace fans who have experienced a toxic relationship at some point in their lives. Graham Hartmann of Metal Injection wrote that the song still "holds up thanks so its unique main riff and powerful chorus. You've gotta give credit to that drum part too."

In 2024, the staff of Consequence included the song in their list of "50 Kick-Butt Post-Grunge Songs We Can Get Behind".

== Chart performance ==
"I Hate Everything About You" peaked at number one on the Canadian rock chart published by Radio & Records. The song also peaked at number 55 on the US Billboard Hot 100, number four on the Billboard Mainstream Rock Tracks chart, and number two on the Billboard Modern Rock Tracks chart. It was the ninth-best-performing song of the decade on the Modern Rock Tracks chart. Despite not being one of their number-one hits on either of the two charts, it is the band's longest-running song on both the Modern Rock Tracks chart, at 45 weeks, and the Mainstream Rock Tracks chart, at 46 weeks.

== Music video ==
The music video for "I Hate Everything About You" premiered on June 18, 2003, via MTV. The video was photographed by cinematographer Steve Gainer and directed by Scott Winig. The video starts zoomed in towards several things, such as a TV producing static, a picture frame, and an ash tray, and then transitions towards Adam Gontier who starts singing. The video shows three teenagers going through a disastrous moment in their lives. One shows a young boy who finds his girlfriend cheating on him in the alleyway, kissing another guy. He is spying on them in his car. The second teenager is a young girl, who just broke up with her boyfriend, and the last is a boy who is being abused by his alcoholic father. Towards the end they are all seen smashing items into a hill. The young boy spying on his cheating girlfriend whips a portrait of a picture of them, smashing it to pieces. The second teenager is seen smashing her notebook of love notes and miscellaneous love items with her ex-boyfriend into the hill. The last boy, who is suffering child abuse, throws his drunken father's alcohol into the hill.

It is the only music video performing as a trio, as Barry Stock joined the group shortly after.

== Live performances ==
The band performed "I Hate Everything About You" at the 2004 Juno Awards. The group also performed the song at the 2004 MuchMusic Video Awards.

== Awards and nominations ==
Awards and nominations for "I Hate Everything About You"
| Year | Organization | Award | Result | Ref(s) |
|---|---|---|---|---|
| 2004 | Juno Awards | Producer of the Year | Won | |
| 2004 | MuchMusic Video Awards | Best Rock Video | Nominated | |
| 2004 | MuchMusic Video Awards | Favourite Canadian Group | Nominated | |
| 2007 | BDS Spin Award | 300,000 spins | Won | |

=== Accolades ===
Accolades for "I Hate Everything About You"
| Publication | Country | Accolade | Year | Rank |
|---|---|---|---|---|
| Alternative Addiction | United States | "Song of the Year" | 2003 | 33 |
| AOL Radio | United States | "Top Alternative Songs of the Decade – 2000s" | 2009 | 8 |

== Track listings ==
Acoustic single
| No. | Title | Length |
|---|---|---|
| 1. | "(I Hate) Everything About You" (acoustic version) | 3:42 |

CD single and iTunes EP
| No. | Title | Length |
|---|---|---|
| 1. | "I Hate Everything About You" | 3:52 |
| 2. | "Burn" | 4:27 |
| 3. | "Are You Ready?" | 2:46 |

"I Hate Everything About You" / "Burn" – iTunes single
| No. | Title | Length |
|---|---|---|
| 1. | "I Hate Everything About You" | 3:51 |
| 2. | "Burn" | 4:27 |

== Personnel ==
Personnel for "I Hate Everything About You" are adapted from the album's liner notes.

Three Days Grace

- Adam Gontier – lead vocals, guitars
- Brad Walst – bass guitar
- Neil Sanderson – drums, backing vocals

Production

- Gavin "Golden" Brown – producer
- Ted Jensen – mastering
- Michael "Elvis" Baskette – engineer
- Krisjan Leslie – engineer
- Rich Costey – mixing
- Dave Holdredge – editing
- Mark Kiczula – assistant engineer
- Mike Lapierre – assistant engineer
- Darren Mora – assistant engineer
- Damien Shannon – assistant engineer
- Alley Trela – assistant engineer
- German Villacorta – assistant engineer

== Charts ==
=== Weekly charts ===
2003–2005 weekly chart performance for "I Hate Everything About You"
| Chart (2003–2005) | Peak position |
|---|---|
| Australia (ARIA) | 22 |
| Canada Rock (Radio & Records) | 1 |
| Netherlands (Dutch Top 40 Tiparade) | 19 |
| Netherlands (Single Top 100) | 84 |
| US Billboard Hot 100 | 55 |
| US Alternative Airplay (Billboard) | 2 |
| US Mainstream Rock (Billboard) | 4 |
| US Pop Airplay (Billboard) | 28 |

2025 weekly chart performance for "I Hate Everything About You"
| Chart (2025) | Peak position |
|---|---|
| UK Rock & Metal (Official Charts) | 29 |

=== Year-end charts ===
2003 year-end chart performance for "I Hate Everything About You"
| Chart (2003) | Position |
|---|---|
| US Modern Rock Tracks (Billboard) | 37 |

2004 year-end chart performance for "I Hate Everything About You"
| Chart (2004) | Position |
|---|---|
| Brazil Airplay (Crowley) | 69 |
| US Mainstream Rock Tracks (Billboard) | 6 |
| US Modern Rock Tracks (Billboard) | 4 |

2024 year-end chart performance for "I Hate Everything About You"
| Chart (2024) | Position |
|---|---|
| US Hard Rock Streaming Songs (Billboard) | 18 |

2025 year-end chart performance for "I Hate Everything About You"
| Chart (2025) | Position |
|---|---|
| US Hard Rock Streaming Songs (Billboard) | 10 |

=== Decade-end charts ===
Decade-end chart performance for "I Hate Everything About You"
| Chart (2000–2009) | Position |
|---|---|
| US Hot Alternative Songs (Billboard) | 9 |

== Certifications ==
Certifications and sales for "I Hate Everything About You"
| Region | Certification | Certified units/sales |
|---|---|---|
| Canada (Music Canada) | Platinum | 80,000^{‡} |
| Denmark (IFPI Danmark) | Gold | 45,000^{‡} |
| Germany (BVMI) | Gold | 150,000^{‡} |
| New Zealand (RMNZ) | 3× Platinum | 90,000^{‡} |
| United Kingdom (BPI) | Platinum | 600,000^{‡} |
| United States (RIAA) | 9× Platinum | 9,000,000^{‡} |
Ringtone / Mastertone
| United States (RIAA) | Gold | 500,000^{*} |
^{*} Sales figures based on certification alone.^{‡} Sales+streaming figures based on certification alone.

== Release history ==
Release dates and formats for "I Hate Everything About You"
| Region | Date | Format | Version | Label | Ref(s). |
|---|---|---|---|---|---|
| United States | April 28, 2003 | Active rock radio | Main | Jive | |
| United States | May 12, 2003 | Alternative radio | Main | Jive | |
| Canada | September 22, 2003 | Digital download | Acoustic | Jive | |
| United States | September 22, 2003 | Digital download | Acoustic | Jive | |
| Australia | September 22, 2003 | Digital download | Acoustic | Jive | |
| Germany | September 22, 2003 | Digital download | Acoustic | Jive | |
| United Kingdom | September 22, 2003 | Digital download | Acoustic | Jive | |
| United States | January 19, 2004 | Contemporary hit radio | Main | Jive | |
| Australia | March 19, 2004 | Digital download | Main | Jive | |
| United Kingdom | March 19, 2004 | Digital download | Main | Jive | |
| Germany | March 19, 2004 | Digital download | Main | Jive | |
| Australia | March 22, 2004 | CD | Main | Jive | |
| Australia | January 17, 2005 | Digital download | Main | Jive | |
| Germany | January 17, 2005 | Digital download | Main | Jive | |
| United Kingdom | January 17, 2005 | Digital download | Main | Jive | |
