= Alienation (album) =

Studio album by Three Days Grace
- Released: August 22, 2025
- Recorded: October 2024 – January 2025
- Studios: The Reverie (Peterborough, Ontario, Canada)
- Genres: Post-grunge; hard rock; alternative rock; alternative metal
- Length: 41:46
- Label: RCA
- Producers: Howard Benson; Zakk Cervini

Three Days Grace chronology
Explosions (2022)	Alienation (2025)

Singles from Alienation
- 1. "Mayday" Released: November 22, 2024; 2. "Apologies" Released: May 9, 2025; 3. "Kill Me Fast" Released: October 17, 2025; 4. "Don't Wanna Go Home Tonight" Released: May 8, 2026; 5. "Dominate" Released: October 8, 2026

Alienation (stylized as ΛLIENΛTIØN) is the eighth studio album by the Canadian rock band Three Days Grace. It was released on August 22, 2025, through RCA Records. The album marks the return of original vocalist Adam Gontier, who returned to the band in October 2024 following an eleven-year absence. It is their first as a quintet and dual-vocalist band, as Matt Walst, who replaced Gontier in 2013, remained with Three Days Grace.

== Background and recording ==
During a concert in Huntsville, Alabama, on April 19, 2023, Three Days Grace briefly reunited with original singer Adam Gontier performing "Never Too Late" and "Riot". Later that year, the band reunited with Gontier a second time on October 10, in Nashville, Tennessee. These appearances were initially one-offs, however, after receiving a positive reception from the audience, an idea of Gontier returning to the band and turning it into a five-piece band sparked. However, their managers were hesitant with the idea of Gontier returning to the band and were only behind it if they could write a song together in the same room, leading to the band writing "The Power".

On October 2, 2024, the band revealed via social media that they were in the studio with Gontier teasing a possibility of new music in the works, posting a video with the caption ending "Three Days Grace 2X." The following day, the band confirmed that Gontier had returned full-time, and that Matt Walst would continue his role as a singer as well, sharing lead vocals between the two. The band also confirmed that new music would follow.

"A lot of the time in the studio, it just comes naturally. Who's gonna sing what and where. It's been a lot of fun. We have each other's backs and we cheer each other on when we do a good take. It's pretty cool to be part of."

— Matt Walst on recording with Adam Gontier.

Recording for the album took place in 2024. On November 24, drummer Neil Sanderson told WRIF that they were almost done completing their eighth studio album. The band finished recording the album in January 2025, with an expected release date later that year. The group had been working with producers in Canada, United States and England, via Zoom. They leaned into recording the album remotely, which they had done with their previous album, Explosions (2022). The album's title was revealed to be Alienation and Sanderson spoke about the concept stating it is "a journey through inner collapse and outward defiance." He also told Billboard that the name was a "nod" to their second studio album, One-X (2006), about how the title represents a "person who doesn't feel like they're amongst any sort of community."

== Composition ==
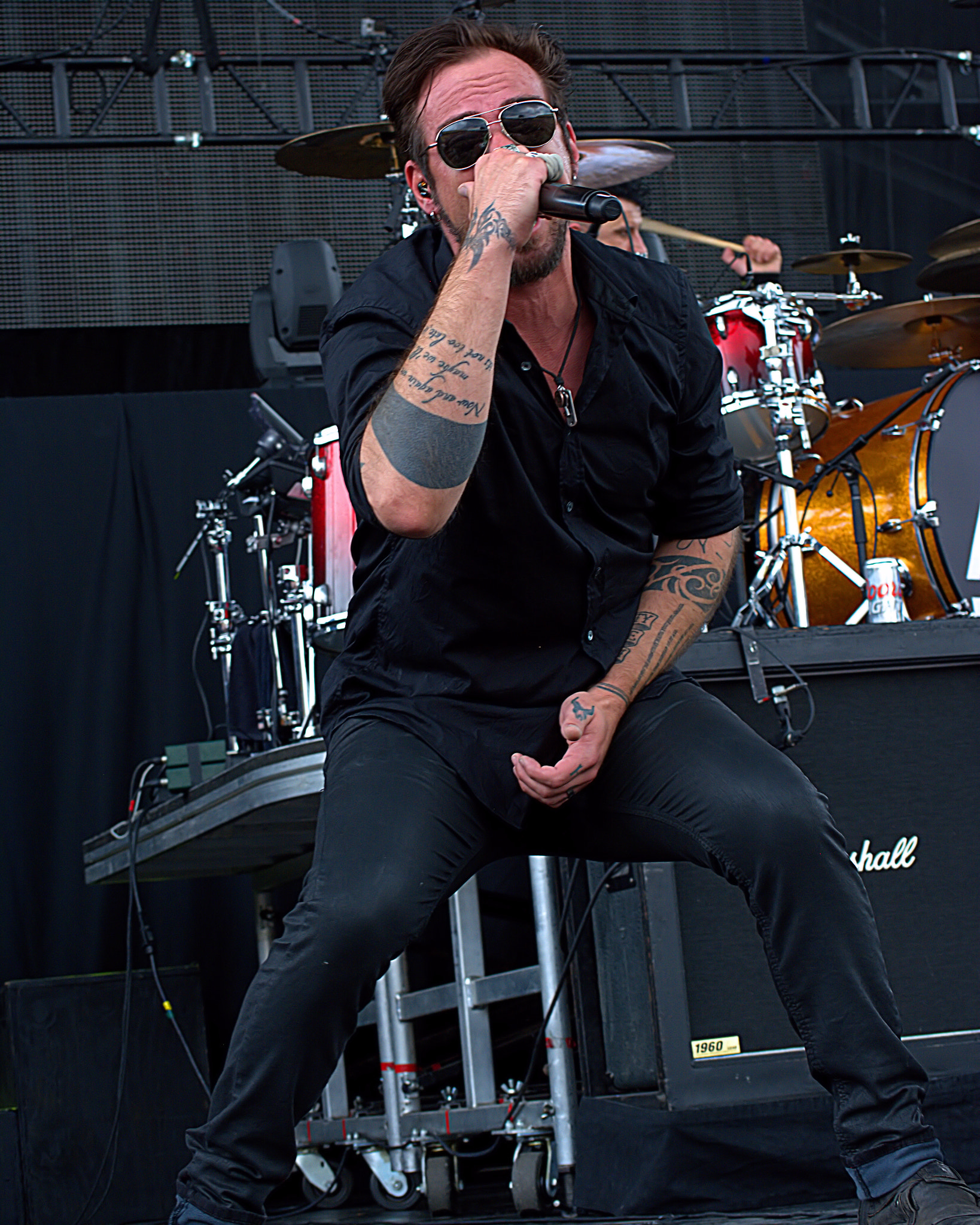
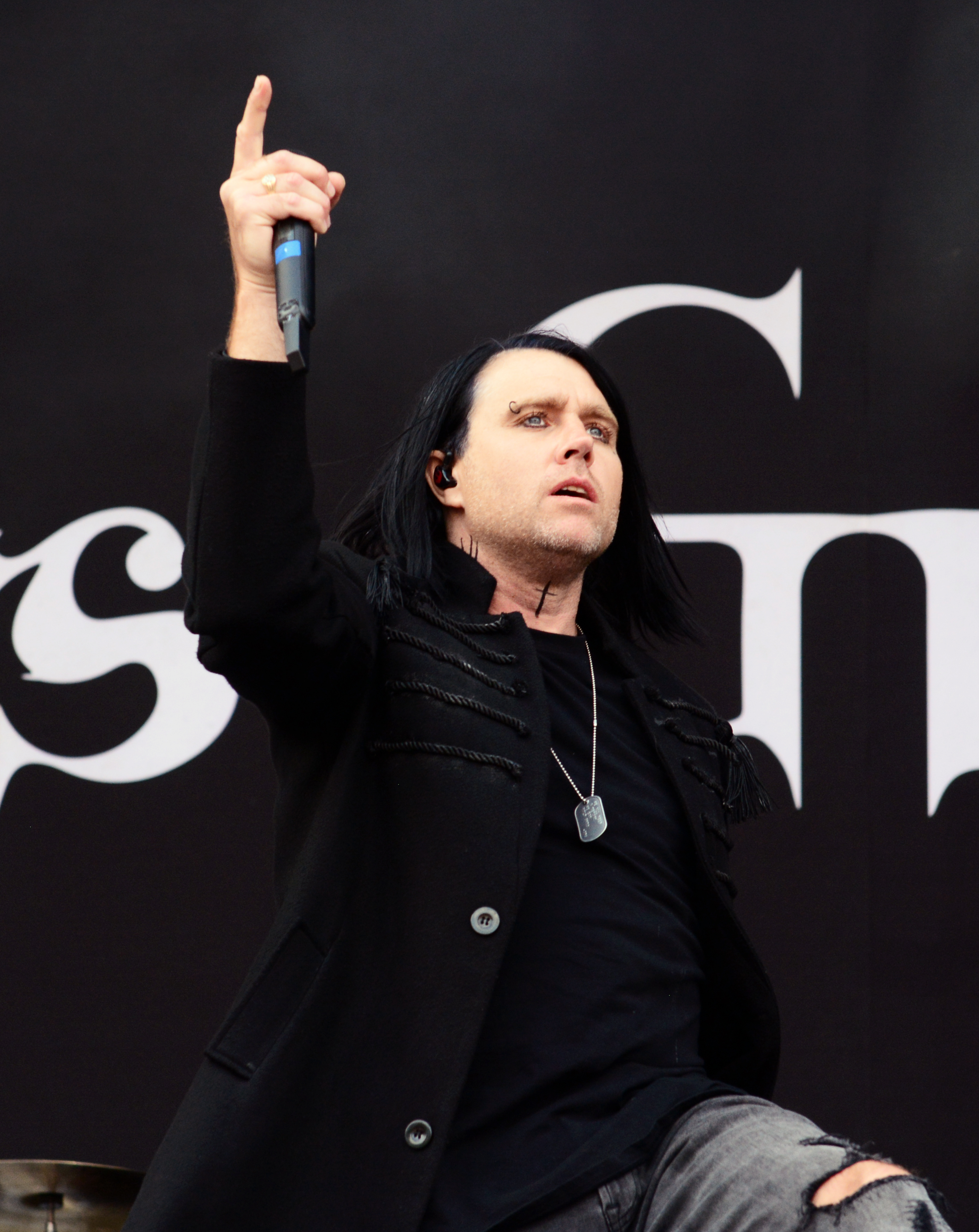
Alienation features the return of longtime original vocalist Adam Gontier (left), who rejoined Three Days Grace just as the band started recording the album. Matt Walst (right) also remains as a singer, making the group a dual-vocalist band.

Like all their other albums (except for Transit of Venus), Alienation comprises 12 tracks, which Matt Walst described as a "pretty diverse album." He said the record contains some ballads and some heavier tracks. All tracks were written in Nashville and at lead guitarist Barry Stock's home studio in Indiana. They worked with three producers, Howard Benson, Dan Lancaster and Zakk Cervini, with the former recording vocals for Gontier and Walst at his home studio in Calabasas, California, and the latter two co-producing at a rented house in Franklin, Tennessee. The group decided to write a few songs at a time and head into the studio to record them "live and make them real," as described by Walst. The band had been writing initial ideas and demoing for the album for over a year, though the process of writing and recording in the studio came together "really quick" over the course of a few months. Gontier said the album features elements of "classic Three Days Grace," as well as some newer elements. Bassist Brad Walst noted that working with Cervini helped them "explore some new musical territory," incorporating elements such as breakdowns and leaning into a heavier style. According to Gontier and Walst, they wanted to "find a balance" between the two eras of the band, blending their older sound they had in their earlier albums with the newer sound with Matt. Gontier later described the whole process as "natural", while Matt Walst explained that it all came "full circle". Though, they later revealed it felt like a "team effort", and occasionally played rock paper scissors to decide who would record vocals for specific lyrics throughout the course of the album.

The first song written for the album was "The Power". Soon after, the band wrote "Mayday", which Sanderson said "a lot of signs were pointing in the direction that we're right where we want to be." "Dominate" was inspired after the group performed in Glasgow, Scotland on September 18, 2022, where fans would chant "here we fucking go" between every song, which Matt Walst stated would be "great to put in a song". The song was selected as the album opener due to the powerful intro. Gontier explained that the writing process for the second song "Apologies" forced the band to "think outside of the box", alluding it to being a very creatively challenging song to make. Gontier and Walst pointed out the pre-chorus for the fourth song "Kill Me Fast" being their favorite moment on the album. The fifth track "In Waves" deals with themes of grief and loss, with the band citing it as being very "personal". The seventh track "Never Ordinary", featuring Lindsey Stirling, was a song originally intended for her to release on her own. The eighth track "Deathwish" was lightly inspired by "Time of Dying", a song from the band's second studio album, One-X. The ninth track "Don't Wanna Go Home Tonight" was the last song written for Alienation, and is described as "90s alternative rock" and different from the rest of the album. The aforementioned song was also written about the band's nostalgia for their teenage years and, according to Brad Walst, was Stock's overall idea, who referenced "1979" by The Smashing Pumpkins as inspiration. The title track finds the group experimenting with a kalimba, which was originally Sanderson's idea and the rest of the band thought it was "cool". "Alienation" was also initially supposed to be on the band's previous record Explosions, but was ultimately scrapped and eventually reworked to fit on this album. The last track "Another Relapse" is described by Brad Walst as "pretty dark song", influenced by Pantera.

The album has been described by critics as post-grunge, hard rock, alternative rock, and alternative metal.

== Release ==
On November 20, the band announced the album's lead single, "Mayday". The song was released on November 22, 2024. In April 2025, the album covers of the band's previous albums and some YouTube music video thumbnails were changed to feature stick figures, leading to speculation of the band promoting their new album. On May 8, 2025, Three Days Grace revealed the album's title and confirmed the release date for August 22, 2025. The next day, the band released the album's second single, "Apologies". The album's track list and cover art was revealed that same day. On June 20, the band released "Dominate" as a promotional single. "Kill Me Fast" was released on July 25, as a promotional single and later released as the third single on October 17. "Don't Wanna Go Home Tonight" was released for radio airplay on May 8, 2026, as the album's fourth single. All four singles peaked at number one on the Canada Mainstream Rock chart. All four singles also topped the US Billboard Mainstream Rock chart and the US Active rock chart, bringing the band's total to 21 and 22 number ones, respectively. On October 8, "Dominate" was released for radio airplay, becoming the album's fifth single.

== Promotion ==
Ahead of the album's release, the group embarked on a tour in Canada with Volbeat in June 2025. The band also toured in the United States with Breaking Benjamin from August to October 2025, with support from Return to Dust. Later that year, they also embarked on a European Tour with Badflower, starting on November 14, 2025, in Budapest and ending on December 13, 2025, in London. The group is set to headline their Alienation tour from February to November 2026, with support from I Prevail, the Funeral Portrait, Sleep Theory, Finger Eleven and Royal Tusk.

== Critical reception ==
Professional ratings
Review scores
Source	Rating
AllMusic	3.5/5 stars
Metal Hammer	3/5 stars
Rock N' Load	9/10
Spill Magazine	8/10
Sputnikmusic	3.5/5

The album was met with positive reviews from music critics. AllMusic wrote, "Familiar themes of struggle and resilience abound, as does the group's assured blend of post-grunge, alternative metal, and hard rock, with highlights arriving in the anthemic 'Dominate' and 'Mayday', as well as the deeply felt rumination on grief 'In Waves'." Matthias Weckmann of Metal Hammer stated, "The mix of alternative metal, alternative rock, and post-grunge is perfectly rehearsed and as captivating as ever. The riffs are sharp, the climaxes are always memorable, the sound as transparent as it is atmospherically dense. And the interplay between Gontier and Walst opens up new dynamic possibilities." However, he said the album "plays it safe musically" and that it lacks "the momentum" their previous albums possessed. Rock N' Loud wrote a positive review for the album praising the group's growth in sound and stated, "One thing that is quickly apparent is the melodic quality that cuts right through; in no time, you will be warbling along with every track as they flow one after another. The production makes every song sound huge, anthemic in quality, adding to the unrelenting passion pouring through your speakers. The dual vocals do add that extra little bit of something special that demands your attention [...] There isn't a bad track on the album; each one hits harder than the last, thicker than the previous and more addictive as you get into it." Joseph Mastel of Spill Magazine remarked that the album "will undoubtedly raise the roof," highlighting "Kill Me Fast" and "Don't Wanna Go Home Tonight" as the standout tracks. Simon K of Sputnikmusic said the album was their "best effort since One-X, but it should have been so much more." He praised the lead single "Mayday" which he stated "does a fantastic job of representing Three Days Grace's best attributes," but was critical on the three follow-up songs noting their lack of "identity and purpose." He also criticized the production on the album, feeling though as if "it was recorded underwater" and "is so thoroughly processed it sounds like Skynet produced it and turned the band's frontmen into cyborgs." Despite his criticisms, he stated the album "does eventually find its footing and present a worthwhile experience overall." Loudwire said, "What makes Alienation stand out is how it ties the past and present together without leaning too hard in either direction. It sounds like Three Days Grace always have — but darker and more introspective. There's a rawness to the lyrics, a weight to the instrumentation and a sense that the band is confronting their own legacy as much as their inner demons. It's not just a comeback, it's a reinvention."

As of December 2025, Alienation has sold 96,000 equivalent album units in the United States. The album was voted as Loudwire's Best Rock Album of 2025.

== Awards and nominations ==
Awards and nominations for Alienation
Year	Organization	Award	Result	Ref(s)
2026	Juno Awards	Rock Album of the Year	Nominated	

=== Accolades ===
Accolades for Alienation
Publication	Country	Accolade	Year	Rank	Ref.
Loudwire	United States	Best Rock Album	2025	1st	

== Track listing ==
All tracks are written by Three Days Grace (Adam Gontier, Neil Sanderson, Barry Stock, Brad Walst and Matt Walst), alongside additional writers as noted.

Alienation track listing
No.	Title	Writer(s)	Length
1.	"Dominate"	Zakk Cervini; Simon Wilcox	3:15
2.	"Apologies"	Wilcox; Dan Lancaster; Joe Rickard	3:06
3.	"Mayday"	Cervini; Ted Bruner	3:23
4.	"Kill Me Fast"	Cervini; Lancaster; Wilcox	3:18
5.	"In Waves"	Cervini; Drew Fulk	3:25
6.	"Alienation"	Cervini; Wilcox; Gavin Brown	2:56
7.	"Never Ordinary" (featuring Lindsey Stirling)	Lancaster; Sophie Simmons; Lindsey Stirling	3:48
8.	"Deathwish"	Cervini; Fulk	3:13
9.	"Don't Wanna Go Home Tonight"	Bruner; Cervini; Wilcox	3:31
10.	"In Cold Blood"	Cervini; Lancaster	3:14
11.	"The Power"	Bruner; Cervini; Andrew Goldstein	3:37
12.	"Another Relapse"	Cervini; Wilcox	5:00
Total length:			41:46

== Personnel ==
Credits adapted from the album's liner notes.

Three Days Grace

- Adam Gontier – vocals, additional production
- Matt Walst – vocals, additional production
- Barry Stock – guitar, additional production
- Brad Walst – bass guitar, backing vocals, additional production
- Neil Sanderson – drums, keyboards, backing vocals, additional production

Additional musicians

- Sophie Simmons – backing vocals (6, 7)
- Lindsey Stirling – violin (7), composition (7)

Artwork

- Matt Barnes – photography
- Ava Litchfield – art direction assistance
- Alex Tenta – art direction

Additional personnel

- Howard Benson – production, vocal production
- Zakk Cervini – production, mixing, composition (1, 3–6, 8–12)
- Ted Jensen – mastering (Sterling Sound, Nashville, Tennessee)
- Dan Lancaster – production (2–4, 7, 10), composition (2, 4, 10)
- Joe Rickard – vocal production assistance, composition (2)
- Chris Dawson – additional production support
- Paul DeCarli – additional editing
- William Donica – guitar tech
- Julian Gargiulo – engineering, mixing assistantance
- Trevor Gilchrist – bass tech
- Adam Haggerty – bass recording, drum recording
- Hatsukazu "Hatch" Inagaki – additional editing
- Alex Krotz – bass recording, drum recording, drum editing
- Jordan Kulp – additional drum editing
- Junichi Murakawa – guitar recording assistance
- Mike Plotnikoff – guitar recording
- Colin Snortland – drum tech

== Charts ==
=== Weekly charts ===
Weekly chart performance for Alienation
Chart (2025)	Peak position
Austrian Albums (Ö3 Austria)	13
Belgian Albums (Ultratop Flanders)	120
Canadian Albums (Billboard)	19
French Albums (SNEP)	169
French Rock & Metal Albums (SNEP)	12
German Albums (Offizielle Top 100)	46
German Rock & Metal Albums (Offizielle Top 100)	13
Polish Physical Albums (ZPAV)	65
Scottish Albums (Official Charts)	58
Swiss Albums (Schweizer Hitparade)	48
UK Albums Sales (OCC)	31
UK Rock & Metal Albums (Official Charts)	3
US Billboard 200	38
US Top Rock & Alternative Albums (Billboard)	8

=== Year-end charts ===
Year-end chart performance for Alienation
Chart (2025)	Position
Canadian Top Album Sales (Billboard)	62
US Top Hard Rock Albums (Billboard)	49
