= Explosions (Three Days Grace album) =

Studio album by Three Days Grace
- Released: May 6, 2022
- Recorded: March–November 2021
- Genres: Hard rock; post-grunge
- Length: 37:51
- Label: RCA
- Producers: Howard Benson; Three Days Grace

Three Days Grace chronology
Outsider (2018)	Explosions (2022)	Alienation (2025)

Singles from Explosions
- 1. "So Called Life" Released: November 29, 2021; 2. "Lifetime" Released: April 11, 2022; 3. "I Am the Weapon" Released: September 27, 2022

Explosions (stylized as EXPLOSIONS) is the seventh album by the Canadian rock band Three Days Grace. It was released on May 6, 2022, through RCA Records. The album was produced by Howard Benson and the band. It is the final album before Grontier rejoined the band in 2024.

== Background and recording ==
The band announced their seventh album, Explosions, after the release of "So Called Life". They also announced tour dates for the spring that will take place in April and May 2022. In February 2022, the band officially revealed the track list and the cover art for the album.

The group began writing the album in February 2020. According to bassist Brad Walst, the album is about, "That feeling inside, like you're gonna explode." He explained the process of recording the album, "We didn't see each other for the longest time. We recorded nine or ten songs separately, in different studios, and by ourselves, which we've never done before." According to Walst, the album has the heaviest songs they've ever written and reminded him of their debut album. Drummer Neil Sanderson talked about what inspired the record with Loudwire, "There is a common thread of theme going through it — the notion of just feeling like you have to self-center yourself in today's world, but then at the same time, you have to hear the opinions of everyone."

== Promotion ==
In support of the album's release, the band embarked on a US spring tour from April and May 2022. The group also headlined the Explosions Tour from July to November 2022 in North America, with support from Wage War and Zero 9:36 for American dates, and The Warning and The Standstills for Canadian dates. They also toured in Europe from September and October 2022. The tour was a success with several shows selling out in Europe, most notably at TonHalle in Munich, Germany, grossing $70,195 from 2,000 tickets sold, according to Pollstar. They later joined Shinedown on the Revolutions Tour from April to May 2023. The tour was also a success, notably the concert at Angel of the Winds Arena in Everett, Washington grossing $522,870 off of 7,123 tickets sold. The group co-headlined a tour alongside Chevelle in the fall of 2023 with support from Loathe.

== Singles ==
"So Called Life" is the first single released from the album. The song peaked at number one on the Billboard Mainstream Rock chart for four consecutive weeks marking the band's 16th number one on the chart. "Neurotic" was released on February 17, 2022, as a promotional single, featuring Lukas Rossi. The second official single "Lifetime" was released on April 11, 2022. The song was dedicated to the people of Mayfield, Kentucky after an EF4 tornado hit the city in December 2021. The song peaked at number one, both on active and mainstream rock charts making it the bands 17th number one on the charts. The third single, "I Am the Weapon" was released on September 27, 2022.

== Critical reception ==
Professional ratings
Review scores
Source	Rating
AllMusic	3/5 stars
Distorted Sound	7/10
Metal Hammer	4/7
Rock N' Load	9/10
Ultimate Guitar	6.7/10
Wall of Sound	7.5/10

Explosions has been received with positive reviews. Rock N' Load gave the album a 9/10 rating complimenting Matt Walst's vocals on songs such as "Lifetime" and "A Scar is Born". Timothy Monger of AllMusic remarked, "the album feels like a continuation of the gritty, aggressive rock that has been the group's hallmark since the beginning." Dan McHugh of Distorted Sound stated, "Three Days Grace know how to reel off a tonne of crowd pleasers. The only issue is that the high-energy floor fillers are all crammed into the front end and this allows for the injected adrenaline to wain and dissipate as Explosions progresses." Ricky Aarons of Wall of Sound noted that "some may argue it's 'safe', it also continues to deliver new variations of their signature style, to a fanbase that's literally in the millions, and always craving new material."

In July 2022, the album sold 44,000 equivalent album units in the US. To date, it has sold 187,000 equivalent album units.

== Awards and nominations ==
Awards and nominations for Explosions
Year	Organization	Award	Result	Ref(s)
2023	Juno Awards	Rock Album of the Year	Nominated	

== Track listing ==
All lyrics written by Three Days Grace and Ted Bruner, all music written by Three Days Grace and Ted Bruner, except when noted.

No.	Title	Writer(s)	Length
1.	"So Called Life"		3:26
2.	"I Am the Weapon"	Matt Walst; Brad Walst; Barry Stock; Neil Sanderson; Simon Wilcox	2:55
3.	"Neurotic" (featuring Lukas Rossi)	Sanderson; Lukas Rossi	3:18
4.	"Lifetime"		2:57
5.	"A Scar Is Born"		3:33
6.	"Souvenirs"		3:10
7.	"No Tomorrow"		2:52
8.	"Redemption"	Johnny Andrews; M Walst; B Walst; Stock; Sanderson	3:10
9.	"Champion"	James Walst; M Walst; B Walst; Stock; Sanderson	3:01
10.	"Chain of Abuse"		3:05
11.	"Someone to Talk To" (featuring Apocalyptica)		2:53
12.	"Explosions"		3:27
Total length:			37:51

Japanese edition bonus track
No.	Title	Writer(s)	Length
13.	"Somebody That I Used to Know"	Wally de Backer	3:29
Total length:			41:20

== Personnel ==
Credits retrieved from album's liner notes.

Three Days Grace

- Matt Walst – lead vocals, rhythm guitar, composer, lyricist, producer
- Barry Stock – lead guitar, composer, lyricist, producer
- Brad Walst – bass guitar, composer, lyricist, producer
- Neil Sanderson – drums, backing vocals, piano, composer, producer, programmer

Additional musicians

- Lukas Rossi – guest vocals (3), composer, lyricist
- Eicca Toppinen – rhythm cello (11)
- Paavo Lötjönen – rhythm/bass cello (11)
- Perttu Kivilaakso – lead cello (11)
- Mikko Sirén – drums, percussion (11)
- Lenny Castro – percussion (1–2, 9–10, 12)
- Matt Kelly – steel guitar (12)
- Jet Sanderson – additional vocals (10)

Additional personnel

- Howard Benson – producer, organ (7–9)
- Ted Jensen – mastering (Sterling Sound, Nashville, Tennessee)
- Dan Lancaster – mixing engineer
- Ted Bruner – composer, lyricist, programmer (1, 4, 6, 7, 12)
- Mike Plotnikoff – recording engineer
- Marc VanGool – guitar technician, assistant engineer
- Hatch Inagaki – assistant engineer
- Rhys May – assistant engineer
- Paul DeCarli – editor
- Darren Magierowski – additional production / engineer
- Jill Zimmermann – additional production / engineer
- Jay Wud – programming (8, 11)

== Charts ==
Chart performance for Explosions
Chart (2022)	Peak position
Austrian Albums (Ö3 Austria)	37
Canadian Albums (Billboard)	30
German Albums (Offizielle Top 100)	28
Scottish Albums (Official Charts)	92
Swiss Albums (Schweizer Hitparade)	53
UK Album Sales (OCC)	42
UK Album Downloads (Official Charts)	43
UK Physical Albums (OCC)	47
UK Rock & Metal Albums (Official Charts)	8
US Billboard 200	102
US Top Alternative Albums (Billboard)	9
US Top Rock Albums (Billboard)	13
US Top Hard Rock Albums (Billboard)	4

== Release history ==
Release history and formats for Explosions
Region	Date	Edition	Format	Label	Ref.
Various	May 6, 2022	Standard	CD; digital download; LP	RCA	
United Kingdom	May 6, 2022	Standard	Vinyl	RCA	
Japan	May 6, 2022	Japanese bonus track	CD	Sony Music Japan	
