= Neil Sanderson =

Canadian musician (born 1978)

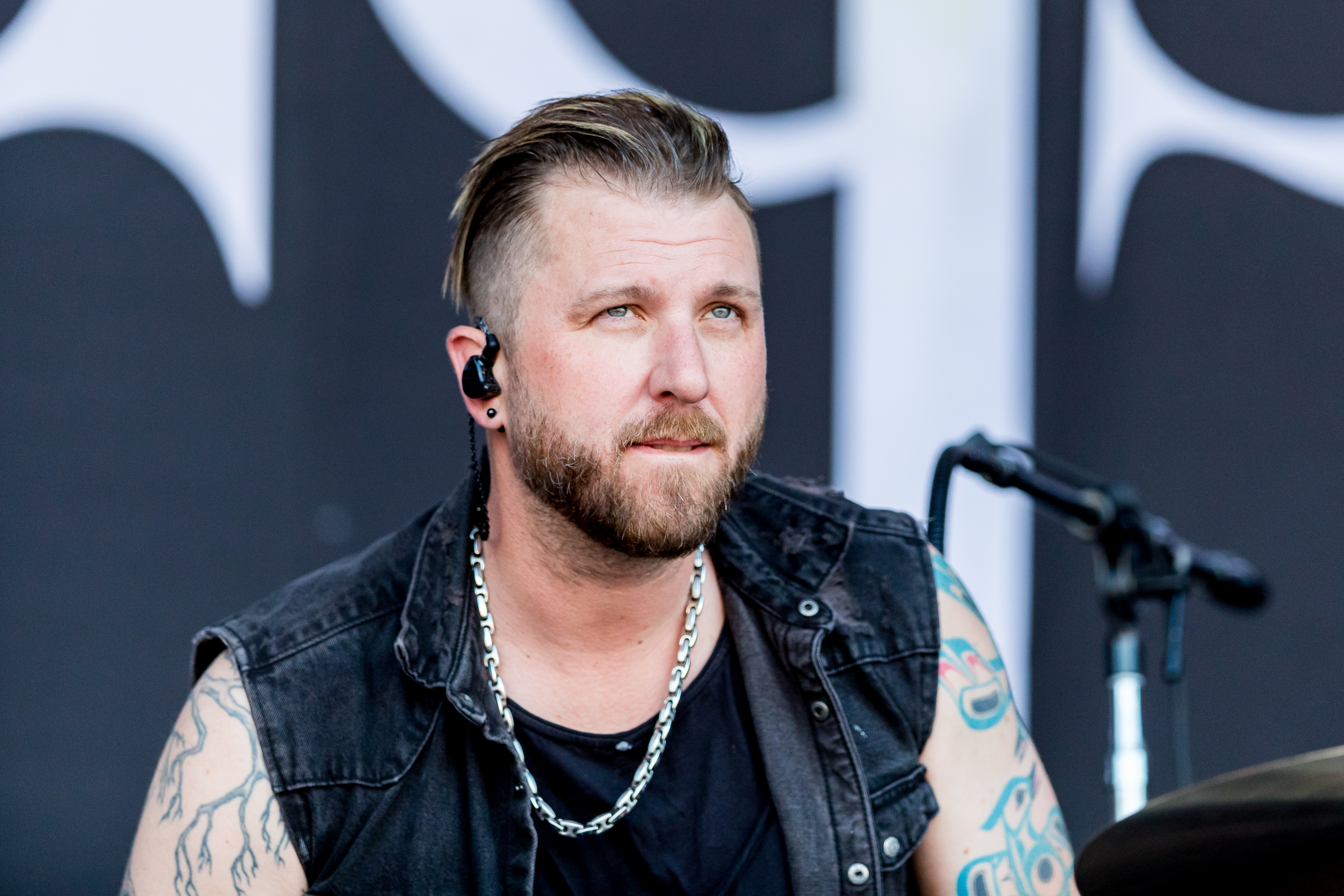
- Sanderson in 2023

Background information
- Born: Neil Christopher Sanderson; December 17, 1978 (age 47); Peterborough, Ontario, Canada
- Origin: Peterborough, Ontario, Canada
- Genres: Post-grunge; hard rock; alternative metal; alternative rock; nu metal
- Occupations: Musician; singer; songwriter
- Instruments: Drums; vocals; keyboards
- Years active: 1992–present
- Label: Judge & Jury Records
- Member of: Three Days Grace
- Formerly of: Thousand Foot Krutch

Neil Christopher Sanderson (born December 17, 1978) is a Canadian musician. He is the drummer, backing vocalist, keyboardist, and co-founder of the Canadian rock band Three Days Grace. He cited his influences as John Bonham, Danny Carey, and Stewart Copeland. He is also the co-founder of the American record label Judge & Jury Records, alongside record producer Howard Benson.

== Early life ==
Neil Sanderson was born on December 17, 1978, in Peterborough, Canada. Three Days Grace's 2015 song "Fallen Angel" is a tribute to his mother, Carole, who lost Neil's father as well as her eldest son while Neil was very young. Sanderson took up the piano before he started school. He had an avid interest in music and worked with different instruments while he was in elementary school. He became enamored of drums and started playing it at the age of 12.

He attended Adam Scott C.V.I High School in Peterborough, where he met Adam Gontier when both of them were in grade 9. With bassist Brad Walst, they practiced writing and playing instruments. They created the band "Groundswell" with Phil Crowe and Joe Grant.

Sanderson was also the drummer for the band Thousand Foot Krutch from 1995 to 1997. Groundswell reformed as Three Days Grace in 1997.

== Career ==
Under the name "Three Days Grace" the band played various concerts and locations in Toronto and eventually signed a recording contract with the American label, Jive Records. The band's first album, the self-titled Three Days Grace, was released in 2003. Four singles from the album, "I Hate Everything About You", "Just Like You", "Home" and "Wake Up" became hits with the first two reaching No. 1 on the Canadian rock chart and the US Rock chart respectively. The album was platinum in Canada and the United States.

The band released their second studio album, One-X in 2006. The album peaked at number five on the US Billboard 200. Four singles from the album were released, "Animal I Have Become", "Pain", "Never Too Late" and "Riot". The first three reached number one on the US Mainstream Rock chart. The album has also been certified triple platinum in Canada and the United States. In 2006, Three Days Grace won Rock Single of the Year at the 2006 Billboard Music Awards. Speaking of the band's comeback from problems in 2007 (when a band member spent time in rehab) Sanderson said, "Now it's all about maintaining that communication, and it makes [touring] so much easier and a so much more enjoyable experience."

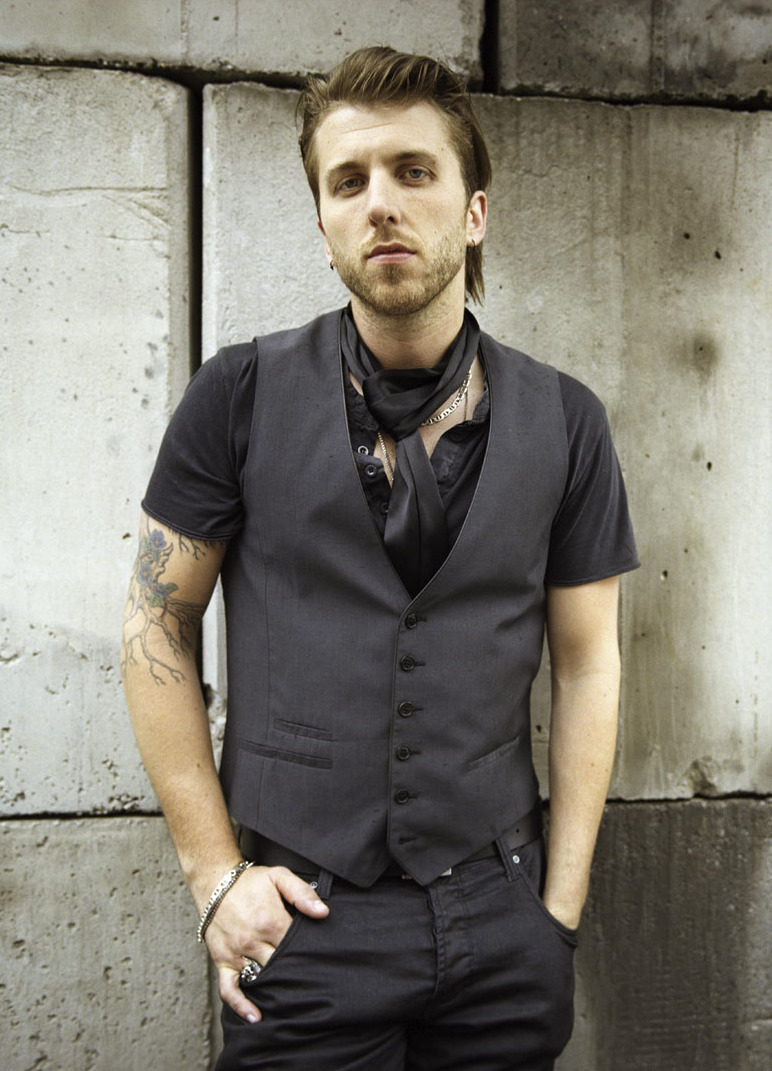
Sanderson in 2009

Sanderson was thrilled by the success of Three Days Grace. Speaking in Greensboro, North Carolina, during their 2008 tour, he said: "We get to blow stuff up onstage now. We like to put in as much production and lights as we can. The seizure factor has gone way up." Speaking of the band's move to larger playing sites, he continued "It's great to be able to see everybody in a smaller place. But the same people who were there in the early days are still there for us." Speaking of fan response to album songs, he said: "[W]e also play a lot of album tracks, and the crowd sings along just as much for those. These days, you have to make an awesome album. I think we're getting back to where people want to hear real stuff, since so much is contrived these days."

In 2009, the band released their third studio album, Life Starts Now. It reached number three on the US Billboard 200. In 2012, they released their fourth studio album, Transit of Venus. Following Matt Walst joining the band as lead singer in place of Adam Gontier, the band released Human in 2015, Outsider in 2018, and Explosions in 2022. In 2024, when Adam returned to the band, Neil worked on the drums on the single "Mayday", after which the band released their eighth studio album, Alienation in 2025.

Sanderson, along with Canadian songwriter Casey Marshall, were part owners of an artist development company and songwriting collective, Püblicwürks, based in Toronto and Nashville. Sanderson co-wrote the singles, "Get By" and "Hell Raisin' Good Time" by Tim Hicks. He was nominated for Songwriter of the Year at the 2014 Country Music Association of Ontario Awards. Sanderson is the co-founder of the record label Judge & Jury Records along with producer Howard Benson. In 2021, he produced DIAMANTE's album, American Dream. He performed on The Standstills' live event, "#UnpluggedTogether", to help fund the Healing in Harmony campaign, a therapy program for trauma survivors. In 2022, he produced their album, Shockwave, as well as producing the single, "Waiting on the Sky to Change" by Starset. Sanderson co-produced the tracks, "Snake" and "Chemist" from Left to Suffer's 2023 EP, Noah. He released his debut single "Eventually" via Judge and Jury in December 2023. Prior to its official release, he performed the song at the "#UnpluggedTogether" event in 2021. Sanderson produced the tracks "Time Bomb" by Saliva and "Sincerity" by Butcher Babies.

== Musicianship ==
=== Equipment ===
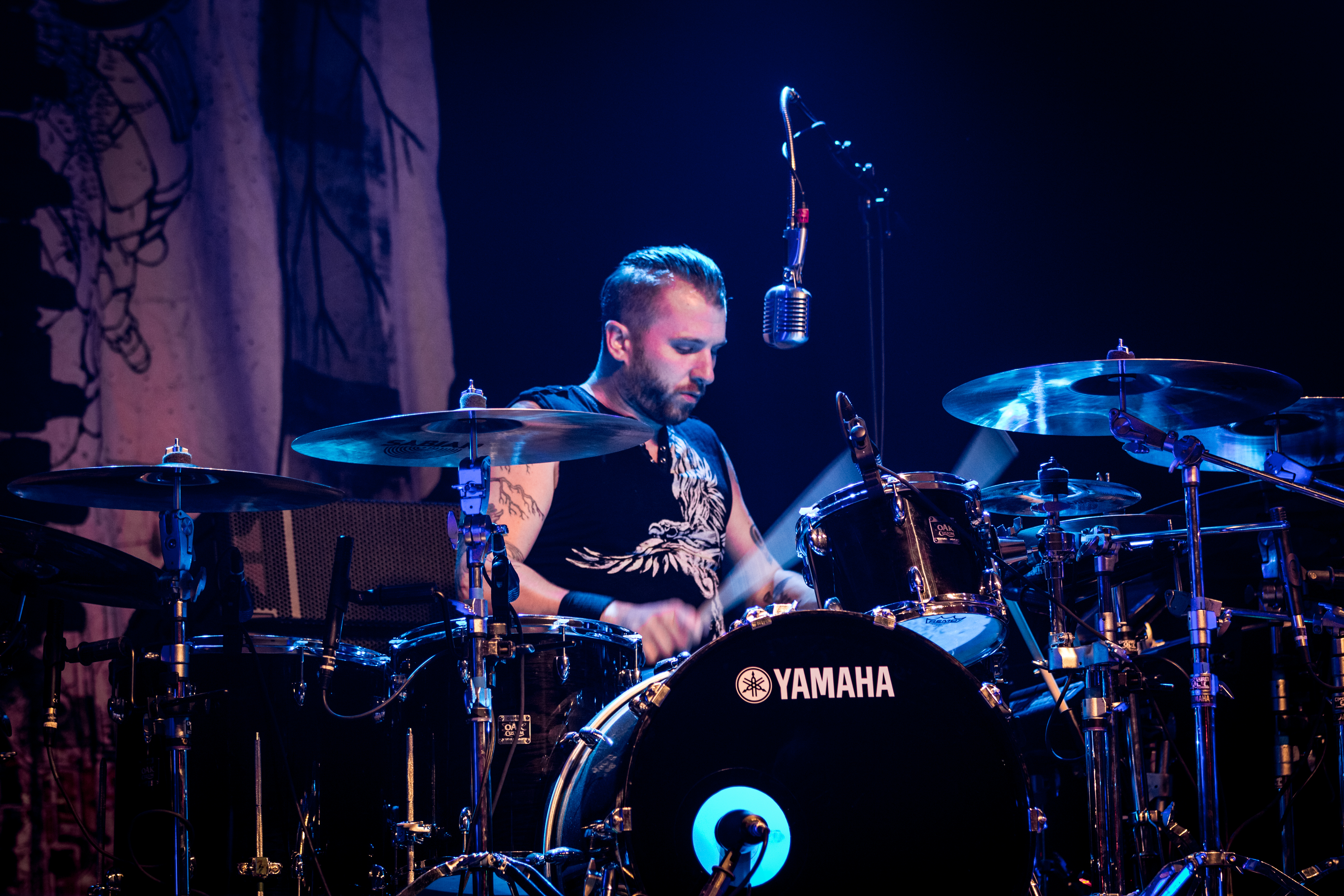
Sanderson performing live with Three Days Grace in 2015

Sanderson uses a Yamaha drum kit. His kit includes a double-bass, Sabian Artisan cymbals, an Evans drumheads and a Yamaha DTX Multi12 sample pad. He also uses Vic Firth drumsticks. His most recent addition to his set is the ButtKicker Concert sub-bass monitoring system. In the past, Sanderson used Zildjian cymbals during the recording of One-X. In at least one song, Alienation by Three Days Grace, Sanderson plays the mbira, a small thumb piano.

=== Reception ===
Sin Lucas, writing in The Silver Tongue said "It's hard to pick a highlight ... but the drum solo by Neil Sanderson was nothing short of spectacular." A reviewer for Electric City wrote of Sanderson's "impressive chops and accuracy." But Nikki M. Mascali of The Weekender wrote of the same performance "Though an interesting concept, it was an unnecessary lull in the show."

== Personal life ==
In 2003, Sanderson married his wife Janin. They have a daughter, Violet, a son, Jet, as well as an adopted daughter, Raven. In March 2024, he led the 21st annual St. Patrick's Day parade in his hometown.

== Philanthropy ==
Sanderson joined The Herbie Fund charity in 2007 when he met the president of Operation Herbie, Liisa Palokoski. In addition, he started a charity fund called, "Herbie Rocks". In 2017, he travelled to Kenya with World Vision to film a mini-documentary raising awareness of some of the challenges accessing clean drinking water. He also created the 3DG Kenya project and Mountain of Hope to help raise funds and awareness of the needs. In 2018, Sanderson opened up about his battles with anxiety at the fifth annual Friday Night Lights fundraiser for Team 55 Let's Tackle Suicide Awareness and the Canadian Mental Health Association.

== Discography ==
Sanderson has served as a producer and songwriter on the Three Days Grace discography and has also worked on music released through Judge and Jury Records, in addition to a wide range of other projects.
