= Matt Walst =

Canadian musician (born 1982)

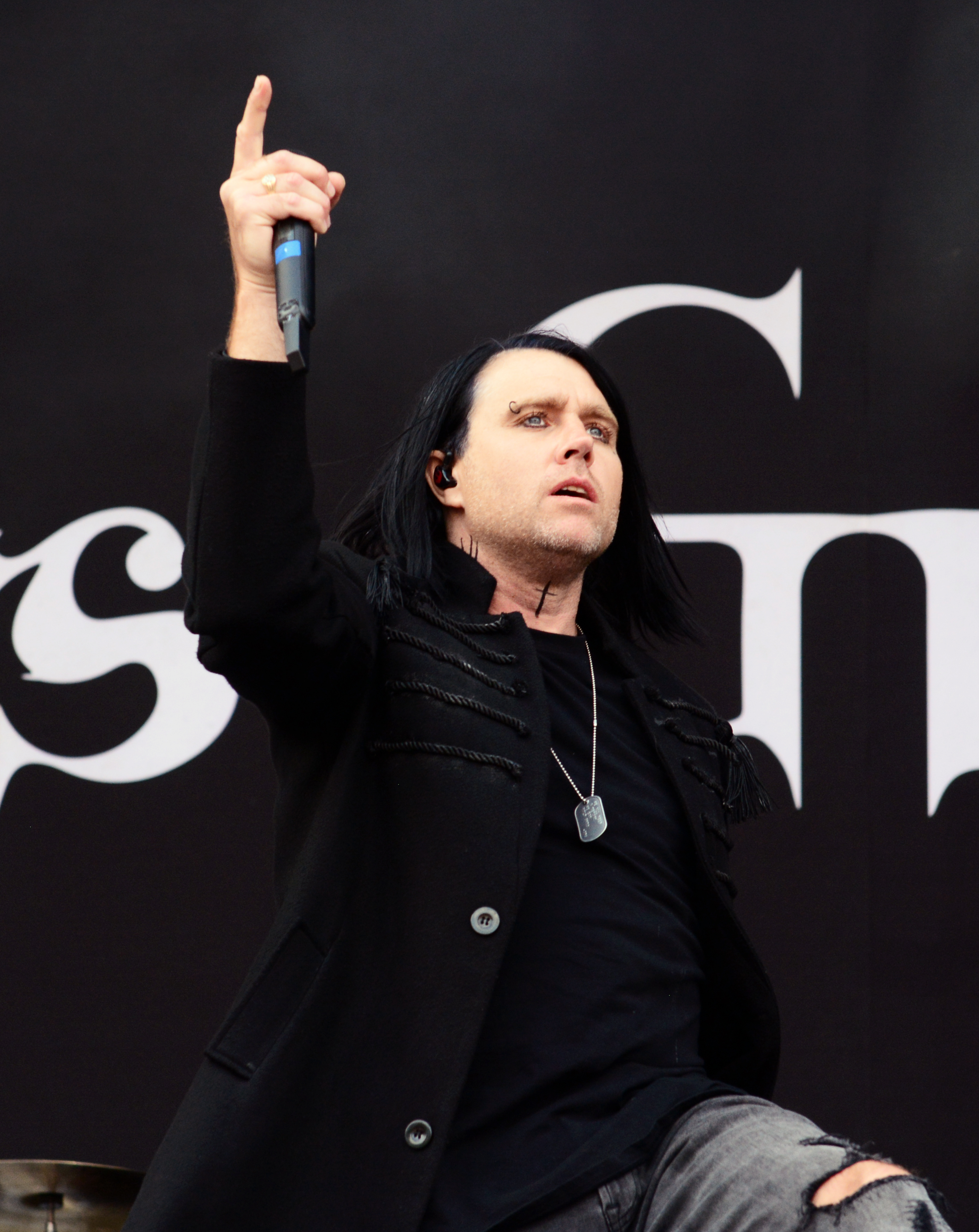
- Walst performing with Three Days Grace in 2023

Background information
- Born: Matthew Jean Paul Walst; December 28, 1982 (age 43); Norwood, Ontario, Canada
- Genres: Post-grunge; hard rock; alternative rock; alternative metal
- Occupations: Singer; songwriter; musician
- Instruments: Vocals; guitar; keyboards
- Years active: 2003–present
- Member of: Three Days Grace
- Formerly of: My Darkest Days

Matthew Jean Paul Walst (born December 28, 1982) is a Canadian musician who is the co-lead singer and rhythm guitarist of the rock band Three Days Grace, which also includes his older brother Brad as bassist. Before joining Three Days Grace, he was the lead singer of My Darkest Days.

== Early life ==
Walst was born and raised in Norwood, Ontario. He began singing at the age of 12, where he also started making his own music. Walst attended Norwood District High School.

== Career ==
=== My Darkest Days (2005–2013) ===
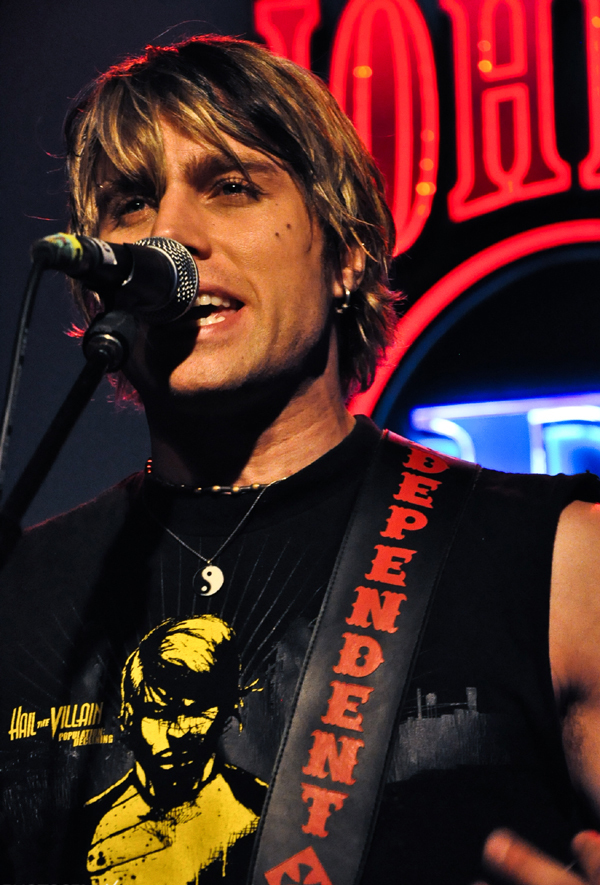
Walst in 2009

Walst formed My Darkest Days in 2005 with his friends Brendan McMillan on bass guitar, Doug Oliver on drums, and Chris McMillan on lead guitar. In 2009, the group signed with 604 Records by Chad Kroeger. They released their debut single, "Porn Star Dancing" in June 2010. The band released their debut self-titled studio album later that year. In 2012, they released their second studio album, Sick and Twisted Affair. After Walst joined Three Days Grace in 2013, the band went on hiatus.

=== Three Days Grace (2013–present) ===
Following Adam Gontier's departure from Three Days Grace in January 2013, Matt Walst was brought on as their replacement lead vocalist for their tour and was later made the permanent lead singer of the band. Prior to joining Three Days Grace, Walst wrote a few songs with the group such as "Scared" and "Let You Down" from their 2003 self-titled album and "Operate" and "The High Road" from their 2012 album Transit of Venus. He was also one of the composers of the said album. They released their fifth studio album, Human in 2015, which was the first album with Walst. Their sixth studio album was released in 2018 titled, Outsider. In 2022, they released their seventh studio album, Explosions. With Gontier returning to the band in 2024 and Walst remaining, they released their eighth studio album and first as a quintet and two-vocal band Alienation in 2025.

Walst joined Bighead, Yung Booke and Young Thug on the single, "Emotions", in 2021.

== Personal life ==
Walst is a fan of the UFC and took MMA classes in 2016. His brother Brad is the bassist for Three Days Grace. In 2022, Walst was inducted into the Norwood District High School Hall of Honor along with his brother Brad and then-former vocalist Adam Gontier. He has two sons born in 2021 and 2024.

He stated that his influences include Deftones and Nirvana.

== Discography ==
with Three Days Grace

- Human (2015)
- Outsider (2018)
- Explosions (2022)
- Alienation (2025)

with My Darkest Days

- My Darkest Days (2010)
- Sick and Twisted Affair (2012)

=== As featured artist ===
Title	Year	Album
"I Will Survive!" (Shadow Cliq featuring Matt Walst)	2023	Non-album single

=== Other appearances ===
Title	Year	Artist(s)	Album	Notes	Ref.
"Legion of Demons"	2010	Psych Ward	Decrepid Methods	Featured artist	
"Elevator"	2017	Fozzy	Judas	Composer	
"Nowhere to Run"	2019	Fozzy	Boombox	Composer	
