= Brad Walst =

Canadian bassist (born 1977)

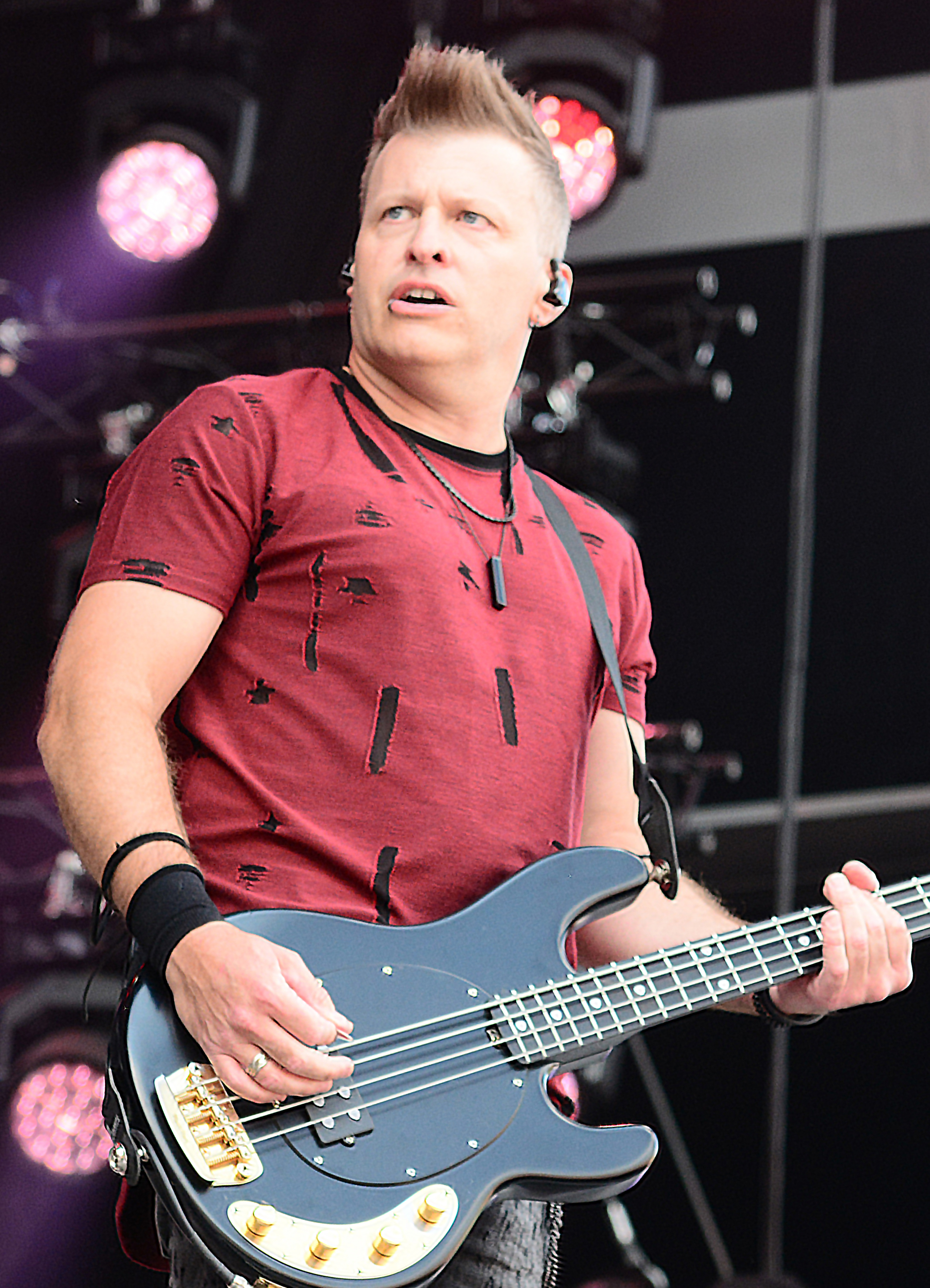
- Walst performing in 2023

Background information
- Born: February 17, 1977 (age 49); Norwood, Ontario, Canada
- Genres: Alternative metal; hard rock; post-grunge; alternative rock; nu metal
- Occupation: Musician
- Instrument: Bass guitar
- Years active: 1992–present
- Member of: Three Days Grace

Brad Walst (born February 17, 1977) is a Canadian musician. He is the bassist and a founding member of the rock band Three Days Grace, which also includes his younger brother Matt. As of 2022, Three Days Grace has sold over 10 million albums and singles combined worldwide and the band's songs streams surpass two billion.

== Early life ==
Brad Walst was born in Norwood, Ontario on February 17, 1977. In 1992, he attended Norwood District High School, where he met and befriended Three Days Grace drummer Neil Sanderson and Three Days Grace singer Adam Gontier. Gontier suggested Walst to play bass for the band. He was in a cover band with Sanderson and Gontier called "The Jupiter Effect" and covered songs from bands such as Nirvana and Pearl Jam. Walst had plans on becoming an accountant before turning to music.

== Career ==
Walst played in a band called "Groundswell" in 1992 with Gontier, Sanderson, Phil Crowe and Joe Grant. The band broke up in 1995 and him, Sanderson and Gontier regrouped as "Three Days Grace" in 1997. Walst thought of the name while he was in college in a business class. The band was soon signed to Jive Records after being sought out by the company's then-president Barry Weiss. Their debut single, "I Hate Everything About You", was released in 2003 and peaked at number one on the Canadian rock chart. They also released their debut self-titled studio album that year. Their second studio album, One-X, was released in 2006 and debuted at number five on the Billboard 200. Their third studio album, Life Starts Now, was released in 2009, debuting at number three on the Billboard 200. It is the band's highest-charting album in the US to date. The band released their fourth studio album, Transit of Venus in 2012, which peaked at number five on the Billboard 200.

Following Gontier's exit from the band, his younger brother Matt Walst joined the group in 2013. Since then, they have released three more albums, Human (2015), Outsider (2018) and Explosions (2022). After Gontier's return in 2024, the band managed to release a new album a few months later, Alienation (2025). Their first three albums went multi-platinum in Canada and the United States. Walst, along with Three Days Grace, was a recipient in the 2012 SOCAN Music Awards in the category Pop/Rock Music Award for their song "Lost in You". Walst was inducted into the Norwood District High School Hall Of Honor in 2022 along with Adam Gontier and Matt Walst.

== Musical influences and technique ==
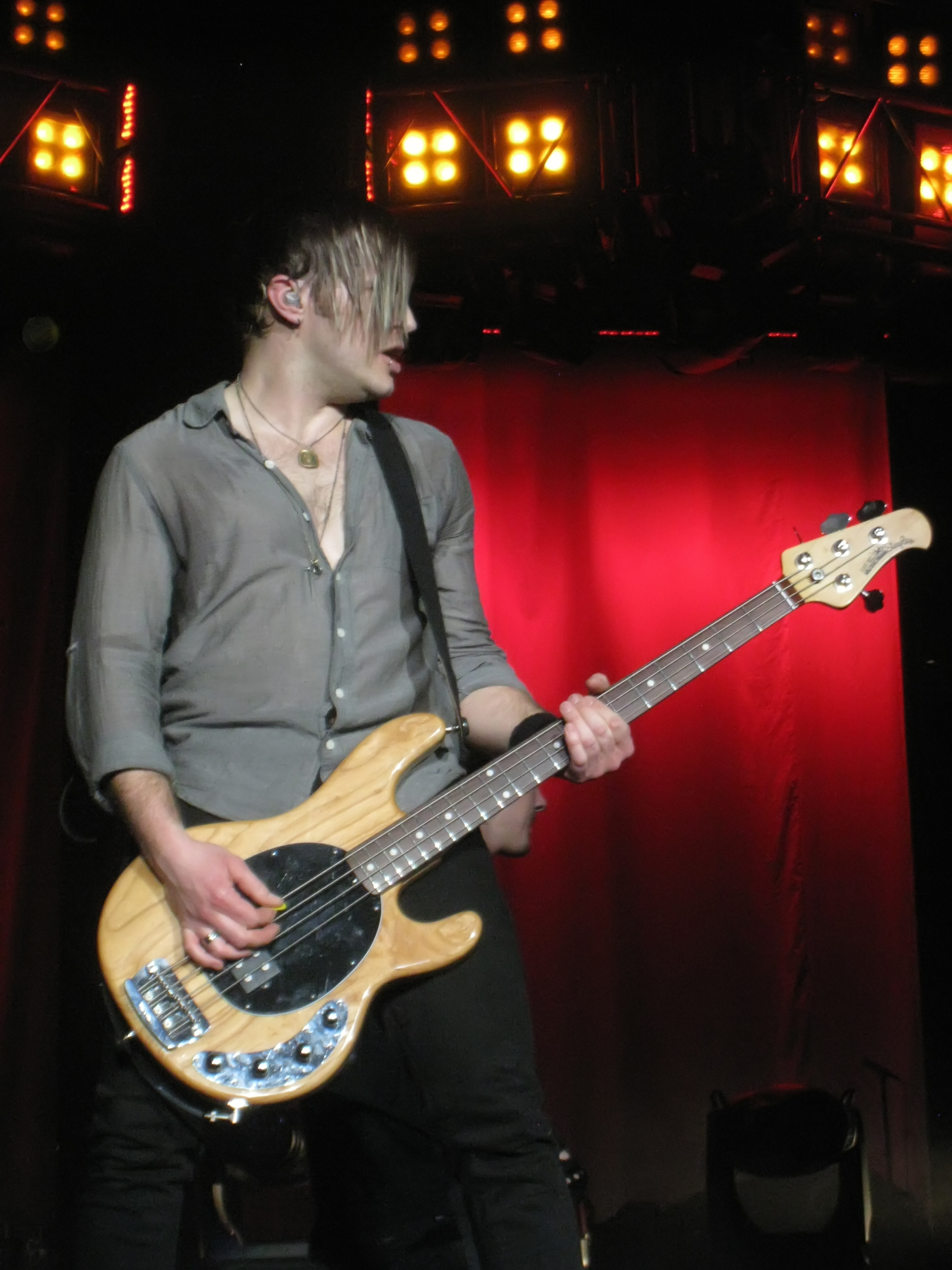
Walst in 2010

Walst cites influences from grunge music, as well as the 90s Seattle rock scene, which has also been an influence to Three Days Grace. He has also cited inspiration from Alice in Chains, Nirvana, The Tragically Hip and Our Lady Peace. On writing bass lines, Walst likes taking the "less is more" approach and considers his style of playing very melodic.

== Equipment ==
Walst uses an Ernie Ball Music Man StingRay as his main bass guitar, as well as using a Lakland bass in the past, during the recording of the band's second album, One-X. He bought his first Ernie Ball bass in 2002, before the group signed with Jive Records. He took out a loan to fund it and has remained a part of his set up ever since. He also uses two Peavey Headliners, an Ampeg SVT-810E Bass Cabinet and a Mesa Boogie amp. He has several boss pedals, an electro-harmonix effects pedal and various bass drivers.

== Personal life ==
Walst is married to wife Rhonda; they have three children. He currently resides in Norwood, Ontario. His son James Walst was diagnosed with having a cancerous neuroblastoma tumour. He joined the James Fund's walk-run fundraiser with a goal to reach $3,000 in donations. His younger brother Matt is the co-vocalist for Three Days Grace and former vocalist for My Darkest Days.

== Discography ==
- Three Days Grace (2003)
- One-X (2006)
- Life Starts Now (2009)
- Transit of Venus (2012)
- Human (2015)
- Outsider (2018)
- Explosions (2022)
- Alienation (2025)
