= One-X Tour =

Three Days Grace concert tour

- Tour by Three Days Grace
- Associated album: One-X
- Start date: May 11, 2007
- End date: November 1, 2008
- Legs: 3
- No. of shows: 95

Three Days Grace concert chronology
- Three Days Grace World Tour (2003–04); One-X Tour (2007–08); Life Starts Now Tour (2009–11)

The One-X Tour is the second headlining concert tour by Canadian rock band Three Days Grace, in support of their second studio album, One-X (2006). The tour began in May 2007 and concluded in November 2008.

== Background ==
Three Days Grace released their second studio album, One-X on June 13, 2006. The group embarked on the headlining One-X Tour, beginning in May 2007, and were joined by Breaking Benjamin and Puddle of Mudd as supporting acts. The first leg of the tour concluded on June 29, 2007, in Hawaii. The also played one date in Nagasaki, Japan on July 4. Following a fall co-headlining tour with Breaking Benjamin from September to November, the group embarked on the second leg of the One-X Tour in North America, from January to March 2008, beginning in Canada. They were supported by Econoline Crush, Breaking Benjamin and Seether. More shows were added for Canadian dates from April to July, with support from My Darkest Days. Included in their tour dates, the concert in Norwood, Ontario, on April 19, 2008, was in support of the Norwood Lions Club $300,000 fundraising commitment to the center. The tour concluded in Europe with its third leg running from October to November 2008.

== Reception ==
A review for the concert at Kool Haus in Toronto, by Jason MacNeil of Jam! Canoe wrote, "Opening a sold-out, two-night stand at Toronto's Kool Haus Thursday evening, Three Days Grace executed this blueprint to a tee before the youthful, party-hard crowd routinely pumping their fists or giving lead singer Adam Gontier and company the devil horn salute [...] While much of the songs seem to rely on Gontier's occasional growls and the work of mohawk-sporting guitarist Barry Stock, bassist Brad Walst and drummer Neil Sanderson also held their own during 'Let It Die'. Aside from the lighting guys, Sanderson might have had the best seat in the house perched on a rather lofty drum riser." Another writer from Jam! Canoe, Lindsey Ward commented on the concert at MTS Centre in Winnipeg, remarking, "At press time, plans to start a 'Riot' were still on deck. Let's hope the noisy One-X track was wild enough to suffice among ballads like 'Never Too Late' and 'Wake Up', which were also still to come. Grunge-heads still mourning the loss of Kurt Cobain would have either loved or loathed the opening set from Seether, who have honed Nirvana's sound to the point where, at times, it sort of creeps us out." Writing for Club Kingsnake, Clint Gilders wrote a review for the concert at the Asphodel-Norwood Community Centre in Norwood, Ontario, stating, "This being a homecoming I was hoping for more audience interaction from lead singer Adam Gontier and maybe some anecdotes about growing up in Norwood. Instead it was pretty much a straight ahead Three Days Grace show with little between song banter and uncomfortable pauses between songs. Adam does do an amazing unaccompanied acoustic version of Alice in Chains 'The Rooster'. I dig their music but have yet to be thrilled by Three Days Grace live, but my hats off to them for doing this benefit concert in their hometown."

== Recording ==
Guitarist Barry Stock told Billboard that they would be filming their concert at The Palace of Auburn Hills in Michigan, in March 2008. The Live at the Palace 2008 DVD was released on August 19, 2008. The recording was directed by Michael Drumm. The DVD peaked at number five on the Billboard Top Music Videos Chart.

== Opening acts ==
- Breaking Benjamin (North America)
- Puddle of Mudd (United States)
- Seether (North America)
- My Darkest Days (Canada)

== Setlist ==
This setlist is representative of the performance on March 21, 2008, at The Palace of Auburn Hills in Michigan, United States. It does not represent the setlist at all concerts for the duration of the tour.

1. "Animal I Have Become"
2. "Pain"
3. "Just Like You"
4. "Let It Die"
5. "Wake Up"
6. "I Hate Everything About You"
7. "Rooster" (Alice in Chains cover)
8. "Riot"
9. "Get Out Alive"
10. "Never Too Late"
11. "Scared"
12. "Gone Forever"
13. "Home"

== Tour dates ==
Date	City	Country	Venue
North America
May 11, 2007	Glen Falls	United States	Glen Falls Civic Center
May 12, 2007	Washington	United States	DC101
May 13, 2007	Boston	United States	Orpheum Theatre
May 15, 2007	Manchester	United States	Verizon Wireless Arena
May 16, 2007	Providence	United States	Dunkin' Donuts Center
May 18, 2007	Buffalo	United States	Agri-Center
May 19, 2007	Columbus	United States	Columbus Crew Stadium
May 20, 2007	Detroit	United States	Freedom Hill
May 22, 2007	Chicago	United States	Congress Theatre
May 24, 2007	Minneapolis	United States	KDWB Radio Show
May 25, 2007	Milwaukee	United States	Eagles Ballroom
May 26, 2007	Noblesville	United States	Verizon Wireless Amphitheater
May 27, 2007	Rockford	United States	Rockford Speedway
May 31, 2007	Cleveland	United States	Tower City Amphitheater
June 1, 2007	Philadelphia	United States	Festival Pier at Penns Landing
June 2, 2007	Scranton	United States	Toyota Pavilion
June 3, 2007	Richmond	United States	Innsbrook Pavilion
June 5, 2007	Knoxville	United States	Knoxville Civic Auditorium
June 6, 2007	Nashville	United States	War Memorial Auditorium
June 8, 2007	Little Rock	United States	North Little Rock Walk Park
June 9, 2007	Kansas City	United States	Liberty Memorial Park
June 10, 2007	Springfield	United States	Jordan Valley Field
June 12, 2007	Lincoln	United States	Pershing Auditorium
June 13, 2007	Des Moines	United States	Val Air Ballroom
June 15, 2007	Maryland Heights	United States	Verizon Wireless Amphitheatre
June 16, 2007	Jackson	United States	Jubilee Jam Festival
June 17, 2007	Birmingham	United States	City Stages
June 19, 2007	Tulsa	United States	Brady Village
June 21, 2007	Denver	United States	Fillmore Auditorium
June 22, 2007	Salt Lake City	United States	The Great Salt Air
June 23, 2007	Las Vegas	United States	The Joint
June 29, 2007	Kaneohe Bay	United States	Bayfest Hawaii
Asia
July 4, 2007	Nagasaki	Japan	
North America
January 14, 2008	Montreal	Canada	Metropolis
January 17, 2008	Toronto	Canada	Kool Haus
January 18, 2008	Toronto	Canada	Kool Haus
January 19, 2008	Oshawa	Canada	General Motors Centre
January 21, 2008	Kitchener	Canada	Elements Nightclub
January 22, 2008	Kitchener	Canada	Elements Nightclub
January 23, 2008	Sudbary	Canada	Sudbury Community Arena
January 24, 2008	Sault St. Marie	Canada	Steelback Centre
January 26, 2008	Quebec City	Canada	Red Bull Crushed Ice Event
January 27, 2008	Winnipeg	Canada	MTS Centre
January 29, 2008	Calgary	Canada	Stampede Corral
January 30, 2008	Edmonton	Canada	Shaw Conference Centre
February 1, 2008	Vancouver	Canada	Commodore Ballroom
February 2, 2008	Vancouver	Canada	Commodore Ballroom
February 4, 2008	Prince George	Canada	Prince George CN Centre
February 7, 2008	Lethbridge	Canada	Enmax Centre
February 8, 2008	Regina	Canada	Brandt Centre
February 15, 2008	Lowell	United States	Tsongas Center
February 16, 2008	Atlantic City	United States	Mark G. Etess Arena
February 18, 2008	Champaign	United States	Assembly Hall
February 19, 2008	Rockford	United States	Rockford MetroCentre
February 21, 2008	Cape Girardeau	United States	Show Me Center
February 24, 2008	San Antonio	United States	Freeman Coliseum
February 25, 2008	Corpus Christi	United States	Concrete St. Amphitheater
February 27, 2008	Little Rock	United States	Alltel Arena
February 28, 2008	Valley Center	United States	Kansas Coliseum
March 1, 2008	Bossier City	United States	CenturyTel Center
March 2, 2008	Orange Beach	United States	The Wharf Amphitheater
March 4, 2008	Tampa	United States	Ford Amphitheatre
March 5, 2008	West Palm Beach	United States	Sound Advice Amphitheatre
March 7, 2008	Greensboro	United States	Greensboro Coliseum Complex
March 8, 2008	Johnson City	United States	Freedom Hall
March 9, 2008	Richmond	United States	The National
March 18, 2008	Evansville	United States	Roberts Municipal Stadium
March 19, 2008	Pikeville	United States	Eastern Kentucky Expo Center
March 21, 2008	Auburn Hills	United States	The Palace
March 22, 2008	Indianapolis	United States	Pepsi Coliseum
March 24, 2008	Minneapolis	United States	Target Center
March 25, 2008	Sioux City	United States	Tyson IBP Events Center
March 27, 2008	Moline	United States	iWireless Center
March 28, 2008	Milwaukee	United States	Eagles Ballroom
March 30, 2008	Erie	United States	Erie Civic Center Complex
March 31, 2008	State College	United States	Bryce Jordan Center
April 1, 2008	Wallingford	United States	Chevrolet Theatre
April 18, 2008	Norwood	Canada	Asphodel-Norwood Community Centre
May 22, 2008	Montgomery	United States	Jubilee Fest
May 26, 2008	Grande Prairie	Canada	South Bear Creek
June 20, 2008	Calgary	Canada	Virgin Festival
June 21, 2008	Montreal	Canada	Heavy Montréal
July 3, 2008	Gibbons	Canada	Boonstock Festival
July 9, 2008	Ottawa	Canada	Cisco Bluesfest
July 11, 2008	Grande Prairie	Canada	South Bear Creek
July 17, 2008	Cadott	United States	Chippewa Valley Music Festival
October 2, 2008	Mobile	United States	Mobile Bayfest
October 10, 2008	Perry	United States	Georgia National Fair
Europe
October 21, 2008	Dortmund	Germany	Westfalenhalle 3a
October 22, 2008	Amsterdam	Netherlands	Heineken Music Hall
October 25, 2008	Stuttgart	Germany	Porsche-Arena
October 26, 2008	Cologne	Germany	Palladium
October 28, 2008	Offenbach	Germany	Stadthalle
October 31, 2008	Berlin	Germany	Columbiahalle
November 1, 2008	Bremen	Germany	Pier 2
