= Live at the Palace 2008 =

Video by Three Days Grace
- Released: August 19, 2008
- Recorded: March 21, 2008, at The Palace of Auburn Hills in Michigan
- Genre: Post-grunge; alternative metal
- Length: 79:42
- Label: Jive; Zomba
- Producer: Michael Drumm

Three Days Grace chronology
One-X (2006)	Live at the Palace 2008 (2008)	Life Starts Now (2009)

Live at the Palace 2008 is the first DVD release by the Canadian rock band Three Days Grace. Three Days Grace dedicated this DVD, in loving memory, to their manager and friend Stuart Sobol. The DVD was originally released as a Best Buy exclusive in August 2008, but soon became available at other retailers.

== Background ==
Three Days Grace was on the third leg of their tour with Breaking Benjamin when they were set to record their performance at The Palace of Auburn Hills in Michigan. Guitarist Barry Stock told Billboard that their film crew would come out on the road in March to record the band's performance. "We record our show every night onto ProTools, so they'll come out and film this and I’m pretty sure we're gonna put together a DVD with that stuff."

The 79-minute recording was directed by Michael Drumm. The DVD was filmed at The Palace of Auburn Hills and captures the band's live performance and the enthusiasm of the sold-out crowd. The DVD also contains exclusive behind-the-scenes footage that allows fans the opportunity to get up-close and personal with the band.

== Release ==
Live at the Palace 2008 was released exclusively in Best Buy on August 19, 2008. The DVD was screened in select theatres on August 26. It was later released to Blu-ray on December 2.

== Reception ==
The A.V. Club stated, "Live At The Palace 2008 features hits from their 2003 self-titled debut and 2006's One-X, including 'I Hate Everything About You', 'Riot' and 'Animal I Have Become' plus a cover of Alice in Chains' 'Rooster'. Bolstered by a literally explosive stage set, Live At The Palace 2008 will leave you wanting more."

== Track listing ==
No.	Title	Length
1.	"Animal I Have Become"	6:38
2.	"Pain"	4:12
3.	"Just Like You"	5:00
4.	"Let It Die"	5:06
5.	"Wake Up"	4:38
6.	"I Hate Everything About You"	5:53
7.	"Rooster" (Alice in Chains acoustic cover)	5:15
8.	"Riot"	7:15
9.	"Get Out Alive"	5:56
10.	"Never Too Late"	4:33
11.	"Scared"	5:51
12.	"Gone Forever"	3:30
13.	"Home" (includes a verse from "Hey Man Nice Shot" by Filter)	15:51
14.	"It's All Over" (studio, during the credits)	4:09

- The concert film includes exclusive behind-the-scene footage featuring members of the band.

== Credits ==
Credits for Live at the Place 2008 adapted from AllMusic.

Musicians

- Adam Gontier – lead vocals, rhythm guitar
- Neil Sanderson – drums, backing vocals
- Brad Walst – bass guitar, backing vocals
- Barry Stock – lead guitar

Production

- Michael Drumm – director, producer, editor
- Stuart Sobol, Nicki Loranger – executive producers, management
- Stacy Kanter, Dan Mackta – co-executive producers
- Michael Tabasco – A&R
- Michael Spencer – editor
- Jay Chapman – producer
- Howard Benson – audio producer
- Mike Plotnikoff – mixer
- Harsukazu Inagaki, Brendan Dekora – assistant engineers
- Paul Decarli – digital editing
- Jason McDaniel, JP Manza – interstitial audio mixing, soundtrack editing
- Timothy Powell – live audio recording producer and engineer
- Dan Glomski, Darren Styles, Nick Smith – audio record crew
- Mike Filsinger – lighting director
- David Rhoades – The Palace of Auburn Hills: broadcast facilities coordinator
- Dan Brown – chief engineer
- Tom Step – color correction
- Jim Sobczak – technical director
- Gary Mclenon, Tony Chrobak, Mark Gomez, Doug Maguire, Matt Regimbal, Steve Biondo, Kevin Bovee – camera
- Dave McNutt – jib operator
- Chris Berkenkamp, Jay Chapman – B-roll camera
- Paul Culler, Scott Edeid – engineer in charge
- Bob Stapleton, Kyle Clements, Victor Navarro, Keith Anderson – video technicians
- Mark Gavras – video tape recorder
- Eddie Bush – A1
- Brian Porter – A2
- Kirk Erdmann Jr. – dolly grip
- Morgan Rhoades, Steven Marleau, Anthony Chrobak, Kevin Lukas – utility
- Christine Ramsey – production assistant
- Peter Kimball – mobile video production facility
- Kristen Pierson – photography

== Charts ==
Chart performance for Live at the Palace 2008
Chart (2008)	Peak position
US Top Music Videos Chart (Billboard)	5
