= Leave This Town: The B-Sides =

EP by Daughtry
- Released: March 15, 2010 [Digital copy] May 10, 2011 [Physical copy]
- Recorded: 2009–10
- Genre: Pop rock; post-grunge
- Length: 22:01 [Digital copy] 25:39 [Physical copy]
- Label: RCA
- Producer: Howard Benson

Daughtry chronology
Leave This Town (2009)	Leave This Town: The B-Sides (2010)	Break the Spell (2011)

Leave This Town: The B-Sides is an EP by American rock band Daughtry. It was released on March 15, 2010, to iTunes. The album features six tracks that were not included on Leave This Town. On April 11, 2011, the band announced that a physical copy of the EP was available for pre-order on the band's official website. It was officially released on May 10, 2011, and included the previously unreleased track "Back Again".

== Track listing ==
Digital copy
No.	Title	Writer(s)	Length
1.	"Long Way"	Chris Daughtry; Jason Wade	4:03
2.	"One Last Chance"	Daughtry; Mitch Allan; David Hodges	3:27
3.	"Get Me Through"	Daughtry; Brian Craddock	3:44
4.	"What Have We Become"	Daughtry; Craddock; Joey Barnes; Josh Paul; Josh Steely; Tommy Henriksen	3:43
5.	"On the Inside"	Daughtry; Richard Marx; Chad Kroeger	3:24
6.	"Traffic Light"	Daughtry; Craddock	3:40
Total length:			22:01

Physical copy
No.	Title	Writer(s)	Length
7.	"Back Again"	Daughtry; Adam Gontier	3:38
Total length:			25:39

== Reception ==
The EP has sold a total of 12,000 copies in the United States as of January 7, 2011.

== Personnel ==
- Chris Daughtry – lead vocals, guitar
- Josh Steely – guitar
- Brian Craddock – guitar
- Josh Paul – bass
- Joey Barnes – drums

== Charts ==
Chart (2011)	Peak position
US Billboard 200	70
US Top Rock Albums (Billboard)	17
