= Three Days Grace (album) =

Studio album by Three Days Grace
- Released: July 22, 2003
- Studio: Long View Farm (North Brookfield, Massachusetts); Bearsville (Woodstock, New York); Vespa, A Room Full of Stuff (Toronto, Ontario); NRG (North Hollywood, California)
- Genre: Post-grunge; alternative metal; nu metal
- Length: 44:08
- Label: Jive
- Producer: Gavin Brown

Three Days Grace chronology
| Wave of Popular Feeling (1995) | Three Days Grace (2003) | One-X (2006) |

Singles from Three Days Grace
- 1. "I Hate Everything About You" Released: April 28, 2003; 2. "Just Like You" Released: March 29, 2004; 3. "Home" Released: October 4, 2004; 4. "Wake Up" Released: January 10, 2005

Three Days Grace is the debut studio album by the Canadian rock band Three Days Grace, released on July 22, 2003, through Jive Records. It was the band's only album as a trio.

Produced by Gavin Brown, the album achieved commercial success, peaking at number 9 on the Canadian Albums Chart and number 69 on the Billboard 200. It received a Gold certification in New Zealand, a Platinum in Canada and triple-Platinum status in the United States.

== Background and writing ==
Prior to being named Three Days Grace, the band was known as Groundswell. They became acquainted with local producer Gavin Brown and gave him several years' worth of material which they had created. Working with the group, Brown said, "It was really about being in the right place at the right time. You try to do all the right things day-in and day-out, and be dedicated to the craft, but when it's all said and done the final element is luck." The band garnered the attention of many record labels after the release of their demo, largely due to the song, "I Hate Everything About You". Eventually, Three Days Grace signed with Jive and began recording their debut album in Massachusetts. The single "I Hate Everything About You" was released in promotion for the album.

According to drummer Neil Sanderson, the album's material comes from the "crazy things" the group had seen growing up. Singer Adam Gontier stated, "I don't find it easy to write about happy shit. You don't need a release when you're happy." The group completed half of the album at Long View Farm in North Brookfield, Massachusetts, while the rest was done at Bearsville Studios in Bearsville, New York. The album's theme deals with "growing up in a small town, being bullied around and everybody knowing your business."

The band began touring with Trapt in July 2003, in support of the album. During this tour, the group added a new member, guitarist Barry Stock, who joined the band after they held auditions for another guitarist. The group later joined Nickelback on The Long Road Tour throughout October and November 2003. The band embarked on a headlining tour called the Three Days Grace World Tour in 2004. They also supported Evanescence on a North American tour in July 2004 and Hoobastank on the Let it Out Tour in November 2004. In October 2004, the band re-released their debut album with a bonus DVD that contained, music videos of their singles, behind the scenes videos, backstage footage and concert clips shot in Brazil.

== Composition ==
The group spent roughly six months to record the album, while the songs on the record were written over the course of ten years. On "I Hate Everything About You", the band recorded two guitar parts for the song, the main guitar part and intro riff. The opening riff was recorded on a Yamaha acoustic through an Amp Farm and the group liked the way it sounded with the acoustic guitar and ended up using it on the final production. On the fourth track, "Home", the band was coming up with different ideas and lead parts "that might sound cool," according to Gontier. They eventually recorded a high-pitch guitar lead that can be heard at the beginning of the song. They used a whammy pedal to "bring the whole tone up a whole octave," which was played around the 12th fret. On the album's lead track, "Burn", the band was in the studio and started "dumping a jar of pennies on a guitar," according to Sanderson. They added some distortion which sounded like fire and the band thought it fit the title of the track really well.

== Critical reception ==
Professional ratings
Review scores
| Source | Rating |
|---|---|
| AllMusic | 3.5/5 stars |
| Chart Attack | 3/5 stars |
| IGN | 8.5/10 |
| Melodic | 3.5/5 stars |
| Rough Edge | 2.5/4 stars |
| Spin | D |
| The Village Voice | (dud) |

The album was met with positive reviews from most music critics. Heather Phares of AllMusic gave the album a positive review, saying, "Although this debut is a little uneven, it's also promising. Three Days Grace are definitely one of the most accessible alt-metal bands of the 2000s; they just need to add some more distinctiveness to their sound." She praised the group's songwriting on tracks such as "Born Like This", "Just Like You", and "Scared". She also called the album's lead single, "I Hate Everything About You", the band's "best song, gaining most of its power from its directness and bluntness in examining a dysfunctional relationship." Dave Doray of IGN gave another positive review, remarking, "almost every single song from the Three Days Grace track list is heavy and catchy, with chewy chunks of assurance and fury thrown in for added measure."

Kaj Roth of Melodic stated, "Three Days Grace plays tough modern rock, standing on classic hard rock ground like a mix between Depswa and Shinedown." He complimented the song "Scared" for its guitar harmonies calling it, "real refreshing." However he was critical on the tracks, "Burn" and "Now or Never" for the lack of "good melodies." In a mixed review, Rough Edge compared the group's sound to Finger Eleven and Trapt stating, "Sanitized for mass consumption, there's nothing about Three Days Grace that we haven't heard before from other anguished, mid-tempo rock acts of the last ten years." Another mixed review was written by Andy Lee of Chart Attack who wrote, "Opener 'Burn' begins with promising rhythmic riffage, if only for its obvious debt to early Rage Against the Machine. From there on in, things head south with a series of gloomy, derivative hard rock numbers that ultimately coalesce into an ungodly amalgam of guitar slop, radio-friendly verse-chorus-verse arrangements and lead singer Adam Gontier's angst-ridden laments." Spin gave a more negative review calling the album, "generic Canadian gripe rock."

On the 20th anniversary of the album, Issy Herring of Distorted Sound gave a positive review for the album. She praised the album's lead single, "I Hate Everything About You" stating, "The lyrics are timelessly relatable [...] with all of us undeniably experiencing a toxic relationship at some point in our personal lives." She also praised the album's eleventh track, "Take Me Under" remarking, "The nu-metal/grunge inspired guitar melodies make the track even more sensational and somewhat sentimental to any 90s kid growing up listening to this absolute masterpiece." However she was critical on the tracks "Overrated" and "Born Like This" for its underwhelming chorus. She ended off noting, "the release may be dotted with slight disappointments, but there is no doubt that the highlights triumph the rest."

== Commercial performance ==
Three Days Grace debuted at No. 194 on the Billboard 200 and in its first week, the album sold no more than 34,000 copies. In January 2004, the album scanned 260,000 units in the US. The album later peaked at No. 69 on the Billboard 200 in August 2004, and sold 356,000 copies that year. In 2006, the album sold over 1.2 million copies in the US. As of June 2007, the album sold more than 1.5 million copies. The album also entered the Canadian Albums Chart at No. 9 and sold 5,000 copies in its first week. According to the Nielsen SoundScan, the album has since sold over 335,000 units in Canada.

== Accolades ==
The album has been certified platinum in Canada and 3× Platinum in the US. The album earned them a CASBY Award for Favourite New Artist in 2003. The lead single "I Hate Everything About You" was nominated for Best Rock Video and Favourite Canadian Group at the 2004 MuchMusic Video Awards. Producer Gavin Brown won Producer of the Year for the song at the 2004 Juno Awards. The song also peaked at number 1 on the Canadian rock chart becoming their first number-one hit in the country. The album's second single, "Just Like You" became the first of many of the band's songs to top the US Billboard Alternative Airplay and Mainstream Rock charts.

== Track listing ==
All tracks are written by Three Days Grace and Gavin Brown, with additional writers where noted.

| No. | Title | Writer(s) | Length |
|---|---|---|---|
| 1. | "Burn" | | 4:27 |
| 2. | "Just Like You" | | 3:08 |
| 3. | "I Hate Everything About You" | | 3:51 |
| 4. | "Home" | Simon Wilcox | 4:22 |
| 5. | "Scared" | Matt Walst | 3:13 |
| 6. | "Let You Down" | Walst | 3:47 |
| 7. | "Now or Never" | | 3:00 |
| 8. | "Born Like This" | | 3:33 |
| 9. | "Drown" | | 3:29 |
| 10. | "Wake Up" | Wilcox | 3:26 |
| 11. | "Take Me Under" | | 4:20 |
| 12. | "Overrated" | | 3:32 |
| Total length: | | | 44:08 |

Target and Japanese bonus track
| No. | Title | Length |
|---|---|---|
| 13. | "Are You Ready?" | 2:44 |
| Total length: | | 46:52 |

iTunes and deluxe edition
| No. | Title | Length |
|---|---|---|
| 13. | "I Hate Everything About You" (live acoustic version) | 3:59 |
| 14. | "Are You Ready" | 2:46 |
| 15. | "Drown" (live acoustic version) | 4:05 |
| Total length: | | 54:58 |

== Personnel ==
Credits adapted from the album's liner notes.

Three Days Grace

- Adam Gontier – lead vocals, guitars
- Brad Walst – bass guitar
- Neil Sanderson – drums, backing vocals

Artwork

- Nick Gamma – art direction, design
- Jeff Faerber – illustrations
- Chapman Baehler – photography
- Diane Schmidtke – groomer
- Mandi Line – stylist

Management

- Mark Adelman – management for Spivak Sobol Entertainment
- Stu Sobol – management for Spivak Sobol Entertainment

Production

- Gavin "Golden" Brown – producer
- George Marino – mastering
- Ted Jensen – mastering on "I Hate Everything About You" and "Just Like You"
- Michael "Elvis" Baskette – engineer
- Krisjan Leslie – engineer
- Jay Baumgardner – mixing
- Rich Costey – mixing on "Just Like You" and "I Hate Everything About You"
- Randy Staub – mixing on "Burn", "Home" and "Let You Down"
- Dave Holdredge – editing
- Mark Kiczula – assistant engineer
- Mike Lapierre – assistant engineer
- Darren Mora – assistant engineer
- Damien Shannon – assistant engineer
- Alley Trela – assistant engineer
- German Villacorta – assistant engineer

== Charts ==
=== Weekly charts ===
Weekly chart performance for Three Days Grace
| Chart (2003–04) | Peak position |
|---|---|
| Australian Albums (ARIA) | 47 |
| Canadian Albums (Billboard) | 9 |
| Canadian Alternative Albums (Nielsen SoundScan) | 4 |
| Canadian Metal Albums (Nielsen SoundScan) | 3 |
| New Zealand Albums (RMNZ) | 21 |
| US Billboard 200 | 69 |
| US Heatseekers Albums (Billboard) | 1 |

=== Year-end charts ===
Year-end chart performance for Three Days Grace
| Chart (2003) | Position |
|---|---|
| Canadian Albums (Nielsen Soundscan) | 37 |
| Chart (2004) | Position |
| US Billboard 200 | 97 |

== Certifications ==
Certifications and sales for Three Days Grace
| Region | Certification | Certified units/sales |
|---|---|---|
| Canada (Music Canada) | Platinum | 100,000^{^} |
| New Zealand (RMNZ) | Gold | 7,500^{‡} |
| United States (RIAA) | 3× Platinum | 3,000,000^{‡} |
^{^} Shipments figures based on certification alone.^{‡} Sales+streaming figures based on certification alone.

== Release history ==
Release history and formats for Three Days Grace
| Region | Date | Edition | Format | Label | Ref. |
|---|---|---|---|---|---|
| Various | July 22, 2003 | Standard; deluxe | CD; digital download | Jive | |
| Japan | September 25, 2003 | Japanese bonus track | CD | BMG Japan | |
| Australia | April 19, 2004 | Standard | CD | Jive | |
| United Kingdom | October 11, 2004 | Standard | CD | Jive | |
| United States | October 26, 2004 | Bonus DVD | CD; DVD | Jive | |
| Brazil | October 26, 2004 | Bonus DVD | CD; DVD | Jive | |
| United States | April 26, 2005 | DualDisc | DualDisc | Jive | |
| Various | September 23, 2016 | Standard | LP | Sony Legacy | |
