= Big Dirty Band =

Canadian supergroup

The Big Dirty Band
- Origin: Canada
- Genres: Hard rock
- Years active: 2006
- Label: Anthem
- Spinoff of: Rush; Three Days Grace; Die Mannequin; Big Wreck; The Tea Party
- Past members: Geddy Lee; Alex Lifeson; Jeff Burrows; Ian Thornley; Care Failure; Adam Gontier

The Big Dirty Band was a one-off Canadian supergroup composed of Rush's Geddy Lee (bass) and Alex Lifeson (guitar), Thornley's and Big Wreck's Ian Thornley (vocals and guitar), Three Days Grace's Adam Gontier (vocals and guitar), Die Mannequin's Care Failure (vocals), and The Tea Party drummer Jeff Burrows.

The Big Dirty Band was put together specifically to support the Trailer Park Boys: The Movie, which premiered October 6, 2006, where Bubbles (Mike Smith) and Alex Lifeson performed their co-written song Liquor and Whores with their back-up band Bubbles & The Shit Rockers. The film's soundtrack was released as a compilation CD in 2006. The Big Dirty Band contributed one song to the soundtrack; other contributing bands are Rush, Alexisonfire, Wintersleep, Swollen Members, April Wine, Rough Trade and The Tragically Hip.

The band performed one live show at the film's premiere party, at Toronto's Mod Club Theatre.

== "I Fought the Law" music video ==
In the video, the Trailer Park Boys are looking at CDs at a music store (with Rush's "Tom Sawyer" playing in the background). Bubbles wants the Big Dirty Band CD, but Julian tells him that they can't afford it. When Ricky tries to steal it, the alarm goes off, and security guards chase the boys, who try to escape via motor scooter. They fail, but stall the guards with help from a woman watering her lawn, football teams, and a bunch of girls. The security guards catch them under an overpass where the band is playing a cover version of the 1959 Sonny Curtis and The Crickets' song "I Fought the Law"; Bubbles comes to the camera and shows the CD cover. Anthony Useless, previously guitarist, songwriter and backing vocalist of Canadian punk/metal outfit Kïll Cheerleadër, also features in this video as a bass player. He would later become permanent bassist for Care Failure's band, Die Mannequin.

== Band members ==
- Care Failure – vocals
- Geddy Lee – bass
- Alex Lifeson – lead guitar
- Ian Thornley – rhythm guitar, vocals
- Jeff Burrows – drums
- Adam Gontier – rhythm guitar, vocals
