= Animal I Have Become =

2006 single by Three Days Grace

Single by Three Days Grace

from the album One-X
- Released: April 10, 2006
- Genre: Post-grunge; hard rock; alternative rock
- Length: 3:51
- Label: Jive
- Songwriters: Adam Gontier; Barry Stock; Brad Walst; Neil Sanderson; Gavin Brown
- Producer: Howard Benson

Three Days Grace singles chronology
| "Wake Up" (2005) | "Animal I Have Become" (2006) | "Pain" (2006) |

Music video
- "Animal I Have Become" on YouTube

"Animal I Have Become" is a song by the Canadian rock band Three Days Grace. It was released on April 10, 2006, as the first single from their second studio album, One-X. The song was released digitally on April 18, 2006. The song spent seven weeks at No. 1 on the US Mainstream Rock Tracks chart and two weeks at No. 1 on the US Modern Rock Tracks chart. The song alongside "Riot" are used in the video game, WWE SmackDown vs. Raw 2007. It is the band's first single with their fourth member Barry Stock. Critical reception to the song was generally favorable, with emphasis on the song's catchiness and angst, combined with its thick guitars and bassline.

In 2024, the staff of Consequence included the song in their list of "50 Kick-Butt Post-Grunge Songs We Can Get Behind". In March 2026, the song passed one billion streams on Spotify, making it their second song to reach this milestone and making Three Days Grace the first Canadian band with two songs to cross that mark.

== Background and writing ==
Lead singer Adam Gontier has stated that while he was addicted to the painkiller OxyContin, he was abusive and angry and had no idea who he was anymore. He wrote "Animal I Have Become" while in rehab for his addiction. Gontier also added, "'Animal I Have Become' is my realization that change had to happen, I had to ask for help." The band wrote a demo version of the song in 2004 while on a bus in Germany. Bassist Brad Walst spoke to Billboard about the song stating, "I remember saying [that] that riff would be great heavy. As soon as we got back to North America, we started jamming it as a heavy song, and it was like, 'Shit, I think we've nailed it.'"

== Composition ==
According to the sheet music published at Musicnotes.com, by Alfred Music Publishing, the track runs at 123 BPM and is in the key of D minor. Gontier's range in the song spans from the notes G4 to C6.

The song's intro contains only bass guitar and a four on the floor drumbeat before the guitar distortion kicks in. The song's main riff incorporates syncopation. Consequence said the song was "a tune built to get stadiums, festival sites, and biker bars on their feet and moving."

== Release ==
In late 2005, the band performed an alternate version of the song in concerts that featured a different set of lyrics. The song was first released online through the group's MySpace page on April 1, 2006, before it was released as a single for radio airplay on April 10, 2006. Both "Animal I Have Become" and "Pain" have been released in acoustic formats and are available on online music stores such as iTunes.

== Music video ==
The video was directed by Dean Karr and was shot in downtown Toronto. It was released on April 24, 2006. The video also premiered on MTV on May 2. The video reached the top five on Fuse.tv and was the winner of Fuse's Oven Fresh.

== Reception ==
Music critics widely described "Animal I Have Become" as a highlight of One-X. Writing for Melodic, Kaj Roth praised "Animal I Have Become" as "really good" and a "great ... single" from the album. In a review of One-X for The Lewiston Tribune, journalist Nate Gibb named the song as "catchy tune" with thick guitars and "straightforward beats." Similarly to Gibb in his review, AllMusic's Corey Apar singled out "Animal I Have Become" as having "a slight singsongy chorus to complement the track's thick riffing." J. Krueger of Consequence.net remarked, "it's a tune built to get stadiums, festival sites, and biker bars on their feet and moving, and it does so damn near flawlessly," praising the song's chorus and "syncopated guitar riff."

=== Accolades ===
In 2006, the song was Canada's most-played rock song and won that year's Mediabase award for the most-played rock song on radio. At the 2006 Billboard Music Awards, the song was nominated for "Modern Rock Single of the Year" and won the "Rock Single of the Year" award. The song received a BMI Award in 2006 along with their other single "Pain". The song was ranked at number 45 on Loudwire's "Top 21st Century Hard Rock Songs" in 2012. In May 2021, for the 40th anniversary of Mainstream Rock Tracks, Billboard ranked the song at number 41 on its list of the 100 most successful songs in the chart's history; in September 2023, the magazine ranked the song at number 95 on a similar retrospective list for the 35th anniversary of Modern Rock Tracks (which by then had been renamed to Alternative Airplay).

Accolades for "Animal I Have Become"
| Publication | Country | Accolade | Year | Rank |
|---|---|---|---|---|
| Alternative Addiction | United States | "Song of the Year" | 2006 | 10 |
| Loudwire | United States | "Top 21st Century Hard Rock Songs" | 2012 | 45 |

== Awards and nominations ==
Awards and nominations for "Animal I Have Become"
| Year | Organization | Award | Result | Ref(s) |
|---|---|---|---|---|
| 2006 | Billboard Music Awards | Modern Rock Single of the Year | Nominated | |
| 2006 | Billboard Music Awards | Rock Single of the Year | Won | |
| 2006 | BMI Awards | BMI Pop Award | Won | |
| 2006 | BDS Spin Certified Awards | 100,000 spins | Won | |
| 2006 | Mediabase Awards | Most-Played Rock Song | Won | |
| 2007 | FMQB Awards | Rock Song of the Year | Won | |
| 2008 | SOCAN Awards | SOCAN Salutes | Won | |

== Personnel ==
Credits for "Animal I Have Become" adapted from the album's liner notes.

Three Days Grace

- Adam Gontier – lead vocals, rhythm guitar
- Barry Stock – lead guitar
- Brad Walst – bass guitar
- Neil Sanderson – drums, backing vocals

Additional musicians

- Ned Brower – background vocals
- Howard Benson – keyboards

Production

- Howard Benson – producer, programming
- Chris Lord-Alge – mixing
- Ted Jensen – mastering
- Mike Plotnikoff – recording
- Hatsukazu Inagaki – assistant engineer
- Casey Stone – engineering

== Charts ==
=== Weekly charts ===
2006 weekly chart performance for "Animal I Have Become"
| Chart (2006) | Peak position |
|---|---|
| Canada Airplay (Nielsen BDS) | 29 |
| Canada Rock Top 30 (Radio & Records) | 2 |
| Canada Rock (Billboard) | 3 |
| US Billboard Hot 100 | 60 |
| US Alternative Airplay (Billboard) | 1 |
| US Mainstream Rock (Billboard) | 1 |
| US Pop 100 (Billboard) | 60 |

2025 weekly chart performance for "Animal I Have Become"
| Chart (2025) | Peak position |
|---|---|
| UK Rock & Metal (Official Charts) | 23 |

=== Year-end charts ===
2006 year-end chart performance for "Animal I Have Become"
| Chart (2006) | Position |
|---|---|
| Canada Rock (Radio & Records) | 2 |
| US Alternative Airplay (Billboard) | 2 |
| US Mainstream Rock (Billboard) | 1 |

2024 year-end chart performance for "Animal I Have Become"
| Chart (2024) | Position |
|---|---|
| US Hard Rock Streaming Songs (Billboard) | 21 |

2025 year-end chart performance for "Animal I Have Become"
| Chart (2025) | Position |
|---|---|
| US Hard Rock Streaming Songs (Billboard) | 11 |

== Certifications ==
Certifications and sales for "Animal I Have Become"
| Region | Certification | Certified units/sales |
|---|---|---|
| Canada (Music Canada) | 2× Platinum | 160,000^{‡} |
| Denmark (IFPI Danmark) | Gold | 45,000^{‡} |
| Germany (BVMI) | Gold | 300,000^{‡} |
| New Zealand (RMNZ) | 2× Platinum | 60,000^{‡} |
| United Kingdom (BPI) | Platinum | 600,000^{‡} |
| United States (RIAA) | 9× Platinum | 9,000,000^{‡} |
Ringtone / Mastertone
| Canada (Music Canada) | Gold | 20,000^{*} |
| United States (RIAA) | Gold | 500,000^{*} |
^{*} Sales figures based on certification alone.^{‡} Sales+streaming figures based on certification alone.

== Release history ==
Release dates and formats for "Animal I Have Become"
| Region | Date | Format | Label | Ref(s). |
|---|---|---|---|---|
| United States | April 10, 2006 | Alternative radio | Jive | |
| United States | April 10, 2006 | Mainstream rock | Jive | |
| Various | April 18, 2006 | Digital download | Jive | |
