= One-X =

Studio album by Three Days Grace
- Released: June 13, 2006
- Recorded: November 2005 – January 2006
- Studios: Bay 7 Studios (Valley Village, California); Sparky Dark Studios (Calabasas, California)
- Genres: Post-grunge; alternative metal; alternative rock
- Length: 43:44
- Label: Jive
- Producer: Howard Benson

Three Days Grace chronology
Three Days Grace (2003)	One-X (2006)	Life Starts Now (2009)

Singles from One-X
- 1. "Animal I Have Become" Released: April 10, 2006; 2. "Pain" Released: September 19, 2006; 3. "Never Too Late" Released: May 7, 2007; 4. "Riot" Released: November 6, 2007

One-X is the second studio album by the Canadian rock band Three Days Grace, released on June 13, 2006 as their sole album under Sony BMG, the successor to Sony Music Entertainment's original roots and Bertelsmann Music Group. The Sony BMG joint venture was dropped in 2008, which led to Bertelsmann's Sony BMG stake going back to Sony. Produced by Howard Benson, it is the band's first album recorded as a quartet, as Barry Stock joined the group and took over lead guitar from lead singer Adam Gontier.

One-X was both critically and commercially successful, achieving gold certification in Denmark, Germany, New Zealand and the United Kingdom, platinum in Poland, triple-platinum status in Canada and quintuple-platinum status in the United States, making it the band's most successful album internationally in terms of sales.

== Background and recording ==
The group began working on the album in February 2005 and was originally going to be produced by Gavin Brown with a scheduled release in the summer of 2005. However, the album's release date was pushed back to June 13, 2006, and was instead produced by Howard Benson. Working with Benson allowed the band to showcase a different sound, focusing on vocals, harmonies and melodies, as well as evolving as songwriters. The band began recording the album in the winter of 2005. Recording took place at Bay 7 Studios in Valley Village, California, and Sparky Dark Studios in Calabasas, California. The song "Over and Over" features string arrangements by Deborah Lurie, which was recorded at Fire House Studios in Brooklyn, New York. "Animal I Have Become" was released as a single and received substantial airplay before it was released with One-X.

Previews for four of the tracks on One-X were able to be found on Three Days Grace's Online Trading Cards. Tracks that could be previewed were "It's All Over", "Pain", "Never Too Late" and "Over and Over".

== Composition and writing ==
Adam Gontier wrote many of these songs during rehabilitation after developing an addiction to oxycodone. "Usually we all sit as a group, hanging out, working together, but here I was just alone, writing about how I felt," as Adam Gontier said in his docu-drama about his experience, Behind The Pain. Some of the material written on the album were influenced from his rehab stint, including the songs: "Animal I Have Become", "Pain" and "Over And Over". A lot of the lyrics were written in his journal, which Gontier used to document his life on the road and how he was feeling at the time as a way to vent out through music. Following his rehab stint, he rejoined the group and they settled at drummer Neil Sanderson's lake house and continued writing more songs for the album. Gontier said that the album was a lot more personal to him than their previous record. He wrote this album after feeling lonely and believed no one around him understood him, as well as how constant touring took a toll on him. While writing the album, Gontier was surprised to discover that the rest of his bandmates had experienced similar feelings of disenchantment and isolation from the road. This helped him come to terms with his feelings which ultimately helped the members come together more and complete work on the new record. Bassist Brad Walst explained how they wanted to take their time with the album and didn't want to have any time constraints that would "screw with our creativity." Guitarist Barry Stock stated that One-X is about, "feeling like a target, like you're standing alone in a crowd of people." He also highlighted how the music has "that little twist of hope at the end."

Musically, most of the instrumental parts were written in the band's rehearsal space in Toronto, where each member had different ideas for songs that accumulated over the last few years of touring. Half the record was written in Toronto, while the other half was written in Northern Ontario. Gontier would record 10 to 15 takes of each song, and decide which had the best vocal performances out of those takes and decide which ones to use for the final production with Benson. On recording his parts, Sanderson said, "Sometimes we build from beginning to end. Some songs sound like one big crescendo. And sometimes I don't come in full force until half the song is over."

== Artwork ==
The album cover depicts a string of connected paper dolls with checkmarks on all with the exception of one which is crossed out, thus One X. On the inside, the CD tray shows all red fish, except one black fish, which Gontier explained it represents "loneliness and isolation," fitting naturally with the concept of the album. This same image is also on the "Animal I Have Become" single cover. The lyrics are included in the album booklet. The Japanese and UK edition of One-X contains the bonus track, "Running Away".

== Promotion ==
In support of the album, Three Days Grace joined Staind on their US tour in August and September 2006. Gontier also launched the Three Days to Change tour doing free concerts at treatment centres, shelters, group homes and detention centres across North America. They supported Nickelback on the All the Right Reasons Tour in February 2007. The group embarked on the One-X Tour in the US and Japan, featuring support from Breaking Benjamin and Puddle of Mudd, with dates running from May 11 to July 4. They also performed in Australia in mid-2007. The group co-headlined a North American fall tour with Breaking Benjamin running through September to November 2007. The band later continued the One-X tour in early 2008, performing in Canada and the US, with supporting acts from Breaking Benjamin and Seether from January to March. The tour concluded in Europe in October and November 2008. A recording of their tour, entitled Live at the Palace 2008, was released in August 2008.

== Commercial performance ==
The album debuted at No. 2 on the Canadian Albums Chart selling just under 19,000 copies in its first week. The album also entered the Billboard 200 albums chart at No. 5 with first week sales of more than 78,000 copies. The album has sold over 1.2 million copies in the US and 158,000 units in Canada.

== Critical reception ==
Professional ratings
Review scores
Source	Rating
AllMusic	3.5/5 stars
Jam!	1.5/5 stars
Melodic	3/5 stars

One-X was met with mixed to positive reviews. The Toronto Star complimented the album with a review title of "One CD worth buying..." and focused on its lyrics, stating, "The lyrics really speak out to you, especially if you're going through a tough time in your life." AllMusic reviewer Corey Apar praised the music, saying it "remains catchy despite its lyrical darkness." However, he criticized the lack of distinctive qualities that could have separated them from their alt-metal peers but stated, "One-X certainly plays as a proficient step in the right direction." Kaj Roth at Melodic criticized the predictability of the album, stating "Three Days Grace has lost their soul, their debut was a lot better!" Roth, however, praised the songs "Animal I Have Become" and "Pain". On the contrary, Nate Gibb of The Lewiston Tribune said the album "is worth a listen," and was more impressed with this album compared to their debut, praising the hooks and melodies, specifically on the tracks "On My Own" and "Over and Over".

Andrew Blackie of FasterLouder gave a negative review for the album stating, "they just cram as many hooks as they can into twelve songs about anything and everything, and find themselves lost in the sickening over production." Another negative review written by Darryl Sterdan of Jam! Canoe, he stated, "those who would rather hear painfully unoriginal post-grunge than nothing at all are free to buy the dreary One-X, the dozen-track sophomore CD from these dark-hearted chest-beaters who make Nickelback seem sublime."

In 2026, Loudwire published an article of "The Best Album by 11 Legendary 2000s Rock Bands", regarding Three Days Grace's One-X as their best record to date, calling it "the soundtrack to the angsty youth of the 2000s," resonating with fans, past and present.

=== Accolades ===
In 2007, One-X earned the band an award for Rock Artist of the Year by Billboard magazine. The album also earned a 2007 Juno Award nomination for Album of the Year. They won a Mediabase award for most played rock song on radio in Canada for their single "Animal I Have Become". One-X has been certified triple platinum in Canada and 5× platinum in the US, respectively. All four of the album's singles as of November 2025, have gone multi-platinum by the Recording Industry Association of America. In addition, all album songs, excluding the title track, have received RIAA certifications; "Time of Dying", "Get Out Alive" and "Gone Forever" were certified platinum, while "It's All Over", "Let it Die", "Over and Over" and "On My Own" received gold status. In December 2024, "Gone Forever" was certified gold in Canada.

Accolades for One-X
Publication	Country	Accolade	Year	Rank	Ref.
Alternative Addiction	United States	"Alternative Album of the Year"	2006	10	

== Awards and nominations ==
Awards and nominations for One-X
Year	Organization	Award	Result	Ref(s)
2007	Juno Awards	Album of the Year	Nominated	

== Track listing ==
All tracks are written by Three Days Grace (Adam Gontier, Neil Sanderson, Brad Walst, Barry Stock), with additional writers where noted.

Standard edition
No.	Title	Writer(s)	Length
1.	"It's All Over"		4:09
2.	"Pain"	Gavin Brown	3:23
3.	"Animal I Have Become"	Brown	3:51
4.	"Never Too Late"	Brown	3:29
5.	"On My Own"	Brown	3:06
6.	"Riot"		3:28
7.	"Get Out Alive"		4:22
8.	"Let It Die"	Brown	3:09
9.	"Over and Over"	Brown	3:12
10.	"Time of Dying"		3:08
11.	"Gone Forever"	Brown	3:41
12.	"One-X"		4:46
Total length:			43:44

Japanese and UK bonus track
No.	Title	Length
13.	"Running Away"	4:01
Total length:		47:45

Special edition
No.	Title	Length
13.	"Running Away"	4:01
14.	"Animal I Have Become (stripped acoustic version)"	3:44
15.	"I Hate Everything About You (acoustic version)"	3:53
16.	"Three Days Grace – Behind the Band"	9:54
17.	"Animal I Have Become" (music video)	3:50
18.	"Pain" (music video)	3:37
19.	"Never Too Late" (music video)	3:30
Total length:		76:13

iTunes deluxe edition
No.	Title	Length
13.	"Wicked Game" (Chris Isaak cover)	4:06
14.	"Animal I Have Become" (music video)	3:50
15.	"Pain" (music video)	3:37
16.	"Never Too Late" (music video)	3:30
Total length:		62:34

20th Anniversary Edition
No.	Title	Length
13.	"Running Away"	4:01
14.	"Animal I Have Become (stripped acoustic version)"	3:44
15.	"Pain (stripped acoustic version)"	3:16
16.	"Never Too Late (acoustic version)"	3:31
Total length:		58:16

== Personnel ==
Credits adapted from the album's liner notes.

Three Days Grace

- Adam Gontier – lead vocals, rhythm guitar
- Neil Sanderson – drums, backing vocals
- Brad Walst – bass guitar
- Barry Stock – lead guitar

Additional musicians

- Ned Brower – background vocals on "Animal I Have Become" and "One-X"
- Taylor Locke – background vocals on "One-X"
- Deborah Lurie – string arrangements on "Over and Over" (recorded at Fire House Studios, Brooklyn, New York)
- Casey Stone – string engineering

Production

- Howard Benson – producer, keyboards and programming
- Mike Plotnikoff – recording
- Hatsukazu Inagaki – assistant engineer
- Paul DeCarli – Pro Tools editing, additional programming, programming on "Time of Dying"
- Chris Lord-Alge – mixing at Resonate Music, Burbank, CA
- Gersh (Drum Fetish) – drum technician
- Marc VanGool – guitar tech
- Ted Jensen – mastering at Sterling Sound, New York, NY

Artwork

- Brian Kushner – editor for the enhanced portion
- Purple Can Post – facility
- Three Days Grace – art direction and design
- Warless Rabit – art direction and design
- Jackie Murphy – art direction and design
- Jeff Gilligan – art direction and design
- Dean Karr – photography

== Charts ==
=== Weekly charts ===
Weekly chart performance for One-X
Chart (2006–08)	Peak position
Canadian Albums (Billboard)	2
Canadian Alternative Albums (Nielsen)	1
Canadian Metal Albums (Nielsen)	1
US Billboard 200	5
US Top Rock Albums (Billboard)	2
US Top Alternative Albums (Billboard)	15
US Top Hard Rock Albums (Billboard)	5
US Indie Store Album Sales (Billboard)	13

2025 weekly chart performance for One-X
Chart (2025)	Peak position
Lithuanian Albums (AGATA)	90

Chart performance for One-X (20th Anniversary Edition)
Chart (2026)	Peak position
French Rock & Metal Albums (SNEP)	28

=== Year-end charts ===
Year-end chart performance for One-X
Chart (2006)	Position
Canadian Albums (Billboard)	25
US Billboard 200	172
Chart (2007)	Position
US Billboard 200	83
Chart (2008)	Position
US Billboard 200	106
US Top Hard Rock Albums (Billboard)	14
Chart (2017)	Position
US Top Hard Rock Albums (Billboard)	35
Chart (2018)	Position
US Top Hard Rock Albums (Billboard)	32
Chart (2019)	Position
US Top Hard Rock Albums (Billboard)	30
Chart (2020)	Position
US Top Hard Rock Albums (Billboard)	29
Chart (2021)	Position
US Top Hard Rock Albums (Billboard)	26
Chart (2022)	Position
US Top Hard Rock Albums (Billboard)	21
Chart (2023)	Position
US Top Hard Rock Albums (Billboard)	29
Chart (2024)	Position
US Top Hard Rock Albums (Billboard)	22
Chart (2025)	Position
US Top Hard Rock Albums (Billboard)	17
US Top Rock & Alternative Albums (Billboard)	68

== Certifications ==
Certifications and sales for One-X
Region	Certification	Certified units/sales
Canada (Music Canada)	3× Platinum	300,000^{‡}
Denmark (IFPI Danmark)	Gold	10,000^{‡}
Germany (BVMI)	Gold	100,000^{‡}
New Zealand (RMNZ)	Gold	7,500^{‡}
Poland (ZPAV)	Platinum	20,000^{‡}
United Kingdom (BPI)	Gold	100,000^{‡}
United States (RIAA)	5× Platinum	5,000,000^{‡}
^{‡} Sales+streaming figures based on certification alone.

== Release history ==
Release history and formats for One-X
Region	Date	Edition	Format	Label	Ref.
Australia	Jun 10, 2006	Standard	CD	Jive	
Various	June 13, 2006	Standard; deluxe	CD; digital download	Jive	
Japan	September 20, 2006	Bonus track	CD	BMG Japan	
Japan	July 25, 2007	Special edition	CD	BMG Japan	
Various	September 23, 2016	Standard	LP	Sony Legacy	
