= Never Too Late (Three Days Grace song) =

Single by Three Days Grace

from the album One-X
- Released: May 7, 2007
- Genre: Emo
- Length: 3:29
- Label: Jive
- Songwriter: Adam Gontier
- Producers: Howard Benson; Gavin Brown

Three Days Grace singles chronology
"Pain" (2006)	"Never Too Late" (2007)	"Riot" (2007)

Alternative cover
- Deluxe single cover

Music video
- "Never Too Late" on YouTube

"Never Too Late" is a song by the Canadian rock band Three Days Grace. It was released on May 7, 2007, as the third single from the band's second album One-X. Written by Adam Gontier and produced by Howard Benson and Gavin Brown, the song peaked at number 30 on the Canadian Hot 100 and number 71 on the Billboard Hot 100. Additionally, the song topped the US Mainstream Rock chart for seven weeks.

In 2025, the track was featured in an article published by CBC Music entitled "Behold the butt-rock renaissance: celebrate the genre's return in 5 songs", in which staff writer Eva Zhu stated it was "a quick favourite of every lonely, sad, and angry teen of the time."

== Background ==
The lyrical content of "Never Too Late" is inspired by feelings of depression, isolation and suicidal ideation, which Adam Gontier, the songwriter and band's lead singer, said was something he experienced and was a song that stood out to him the most from One-X. Explaining about the song, he stated, "I guess it's like feeling like you're at the end of your rope and deciding whether or not to completely give up or whether or not to try and sort of keep making it through another day." He also said that the song was his favorite off the album. According to bassist Brad Walst, "Never Too Late" was the first track written from One-X. The song was written by Gontier, while production was handled by Howard Benson and Gavin Brown. According to the sheet music published at Musicnotes.com, by Alfred Music Publishing, the track runs at 75 BPM and is in the key of D Minor. Gontier's range in the song spans from the notes C4 to B♭5.

On October 23, 2007, Three Days Grace released a single featuring "Never Too Late" and two Clear Channel acoustic recordings of "Pain" and "I Hate Everything About You". On February 12, 2008, an EP was released through iTunes containing the album version of "Never Too Late", an acoustic version, and the music video.

== Music video ==
The music video was directed by Tony Petrossian and was released in 2007. It was also released to MTV on February 14, 2008. The video tells a story about a girl who has a mental breakdown from childhood to adulthood. The music video features an appearance by Gontier's then-wife, Naomi Brewer and actress Matreya Fedor.

== Chart performance ==
"Never Too Late" debuted on the Billboard Mainstream Rock chart at number 33. On the week of August 9, 2007, the song jumped from number three to number one, to overtake Finger Eleven's "Paralyzer". The song topped the Mainstream Rock chart for seven weeks. The song also peaked at number 71 on the Billboard Hot 100 chart. The song reached number two on the Alternative Airplay chart, staying longer than the album's prior two singles at 43 weeks, beating "Animal I Have Become" by two weeks and "Pain" by a hefty 13 weeks. The song is also the band's only cross-over hit to date charting on both the Mainstream Top 40 and Adult Top 40 formats at number 12 and number 13 respectively. The song peaked at number 30 on the Canadian Hot 100 chart.

== Awards and nominations ==
The song was nominated for two awards at the 2007 MuchMusic Video Awards for "Best Video" and "Best Rock Video". The song won a BDS Certified Spin Award based on the 400,000 spins it received in June 2011. The song was listed in Loudwire's "66 Best Hard Rock Songs of the 21st Century" in 2020.

Awards and nominations for "Never Too Late"
Year	Organization	Award	Result	Ref(s)
2007	MuchMusic Video Awards	MuchLOUD Best Rock Video	Nominated	
2007	MuchMusic Video Awards	Best Video	Nominated	
2007	BDS Certified Spin Award	400,000 spins	Won	

== Track listing ==
Promotional single
No.	Title	Length
1.	"Never Too Late"	3:29

"Never Too Late" ringle (single+ringtone)
No.	Title	Length
1.	"Never Too Late"	3:35
2.	"Pain (Clear Channel stripped version)"	3:19
3.	"I Hate Everything About You (Clear Channel stripped version)"	6:22
4.	"Ringtone"	0:30

Never Too Late (EP)
No.	Title	Length
1.	"Never Too Late"	3:29
2.	"Never Too Late (acoustic)"	3:31
3.	"Never Too Late (music video)"	3:31

== Personnel ==
Credits for "Never Too Late" adapted from AllMusic.

Three Days Grace

- Adam Gontier – lead vocals, acoustic guitar
- Barry Stock – lead guitar
- Brad Walst – bass
- Neil Sanderson – drums, backing vocals

Production

- Howard Benson – producer
- Gavin Brown – producer
- Chris Lord-Alge – mixing
- Ted Jensen – mastering
- Michael Tedesco – A&R

== Charts ==
=== Weekly charts ===
Weekly chart performance for "Never Too Late"
Chart (2007–2008)	Peak position
Canada Hot 100 (Billboard)	30
Canada CHR/Top 40 (Billboard)	21
Canada Hot AC (Billboard)	10
Canada Rock (Billboard)	2
US Billboard Hot 100	71
US Adult Pop Airplay (Billboard)	13
US Alternative Airplay (Billboard)	2
US Mainstream Rock (Billboard)	1
US Pop Airplay (Billboard)	12
US Pop 100 (Billboard)	19

=== Year-end charts ===
2007 year-end chart performance for "Never Too Late"
Chart (2007)	Position
Canada Rock (Radio & Records)	12
US Alternative Songs (Billboard)	11
US Mainstream Rock Songs (Billboard)	7

2008 year-end chart performance for "Never Too Late"
Chart (2008)	Position
US Pop 100 (Billboard)	70
US Alternative Songs (Billboard)	31

== Certifications ==
Certifications for "Never Too Late"
Region	Certification	Certified units/sales
Canada (Music Canada)	Platinum	80,000^{‡}
New Zealand (RMNZ)	Gold	15,000^{‡}
United Kingdom (BPI)	Silver	200,000^{‡}
United States (RIAA)	6× Platinum	6,000,000^{‡}
^{‡} Sales+streaming figures based on certification alone.

== Release history ==
Release dates and formats for "Never Too Late"
Region	Date	Format	Version	Label	Ref(s).
United States	May 7, 2007	Alternative radio	Main	Jive	
United States	May 7, 2007	Mainstream rock	Main	Jive	
Various	October 23, 2007	CD	Ringle	Jive	
United States	October 23, 2007	Contemporary hit radio	Main	Jive	
Various	February 12, 2008	Digital download	EP	Jive	
