= Asphodel–Norwood =

- Township municipality (lower-tier)
- Township of Asphodel–Norwood
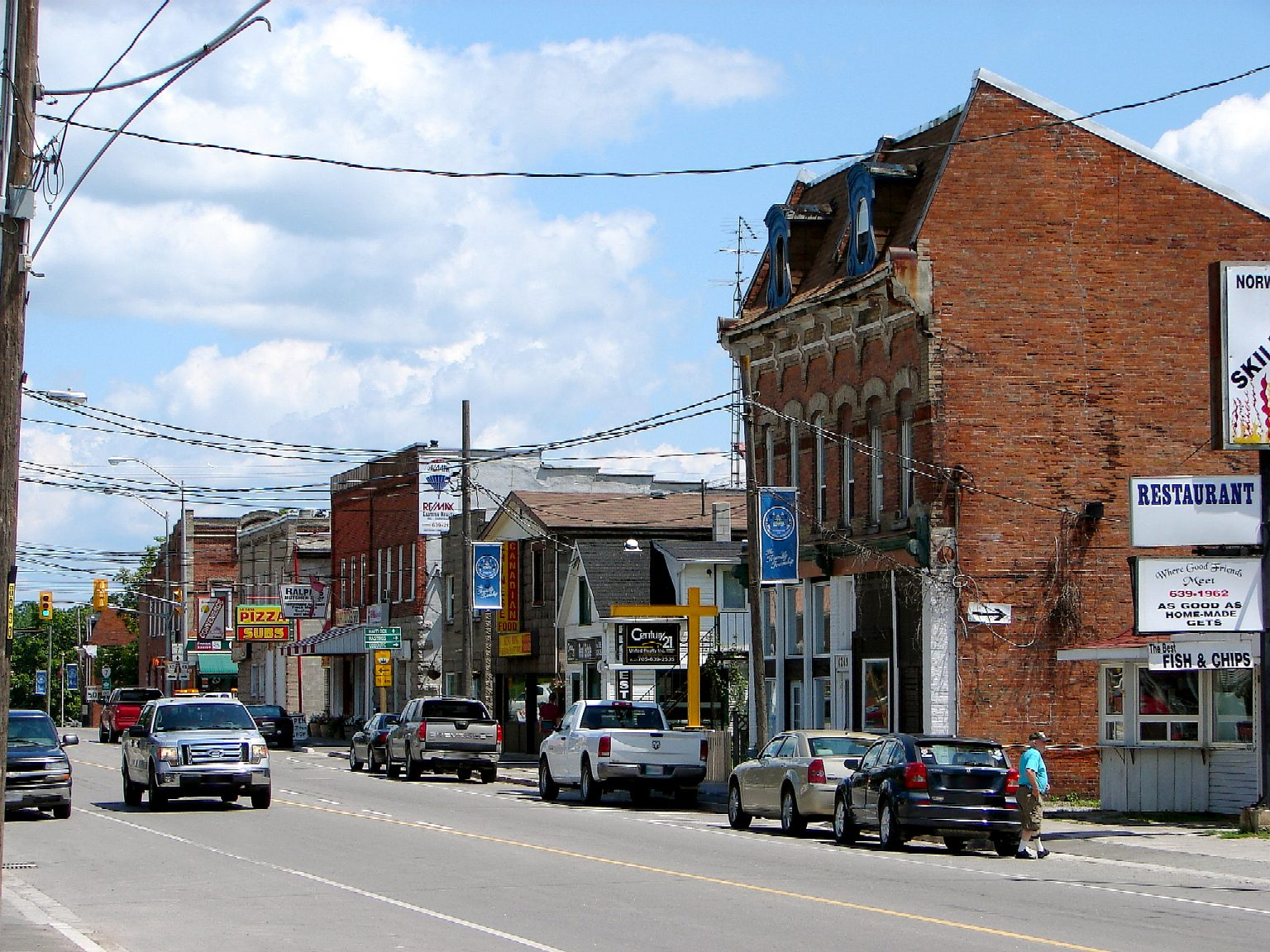
- Highway 7 through Norwood

- Seal
- Motto: The Friendly Town
- Location within Peterborough County Location within Southern Ontario
- Coordinates: 44°21′11″N 78°01′06″W
- Country: Canada
- Province: Ontario
- County: Peterborough
- Incorporated: January 1, 1998

Government
  - Type: Township
  - Mayor: Patrick Wilford
  - Deputy-Mayor: Lori Burtt
  - Councillor: List: Wilburn Archer; Barry Walsh; Paula Warr
  - Federal riding: Peterborough
  - Prov. riding: Peterborough

Area
  - Land: 161.62 km^{2} (62.40 sq mi)

Population (2021)
  - Total: 4,658
  - Density: 28.8/km^{2} (75/sq mi)
- Time zone: UTC-5 (EST)
  - Summer (DST): UTC-4 (EDT)
- Postal Code: K0L 2V0
- Area codes: 705, 249
- Website: www.antownship.ca

Asphodel–Norwood is a lower tier township municipality in Peterborough County in Central Ontario, Canada, with a 2021 population of 4,658. The land on which the township is situated is the traditional territory of the Mississauga, and became open to European colonization following its survey in 1820. The site that would become Norwood was settled in 1823, and it was incorporated as a village in 1878. The township, in its current form, was created in 1998 by the reunification of the village of Norwood with the surrounding township of Asphodel.

The terrain of the township is mostly short hills, with the southern boundary mostly defined by the Trent River. The symbol of the township is the trillium, which grows abundantly in the region. The presence of trillium also inspired early surveyor Richard Birdsall to name the region after a similar-looking wildflower native to England, the asphodel.

Hockey has formed a core part of township life, with minor league teams being formed as early as the 1920s. The annual Norwood Fair draws many visitors to the area.

== History ==
The land in which Asphodel–Norwood is situated has been inhabited for millennia by the First Nations. By the time of the arrival of the first French explorers to the region, the land that is now the township, along with the rest of Central Ontario, was contested between the Haudenosaunee and the Wendat. This conflict ended with the destruction of a large Wendat village in 1649, which resulted in the departure of the remaining Wendat from what was to become Ontario. The Mississauga Nation migrated into the area in the following decades, and it was the Mississaugas that the British recognized as owners of the land that was to become Peterborough County. The British government, having recognized First Nation ownership of the land in the Royal Proclamation of 1763, began to treat with the Mississaugas to acquire these lands to open them to settlement. On 5 November 1818, Treaty No. 20 was signed in Hope Township, known as the Rice Lake Treaty, which in exchange for an annual annuity the Mississaugas surrendered nearly 2 million acres of land north of Rice Lake.

Zacheus Burnham had secured the contract from the colonial government to begin surveying the surrendered land. Burnham, in turn, hired Richard Birdsall to complete those surveys in his stead. In 1820 Birdsall completed the survey of the township. The abundance of trilliums Birdsall encountered while conducting the survey reminded him of the asphodels of his native England, and it is for these that the township was named. Birdsall was also one of the first Europeans to settle in Asphodel, establishing a homestead at lot 1, concession 1.

In 1841 the first semblance of municipal government in what was by now Canada West was created by the District Councils Act, which placed the administrative functions of the Districts of the Province of Canada with an elected council serving under a provincially-appointed Warden. That same year Asphodel became a part of the new Colborne District, and the first representative for Asphodel on the new District Council was Richard Birdsall. Local municipal government began with the passage of the Municipal Act of 1849, which first established local political positions and transformed townships from mere units of settlement into units of governance. Richard Birdsall then became the first Reeve, and represented Asphodel on the council of the new Peterborough County for two years until his death.

=== Norwood ===
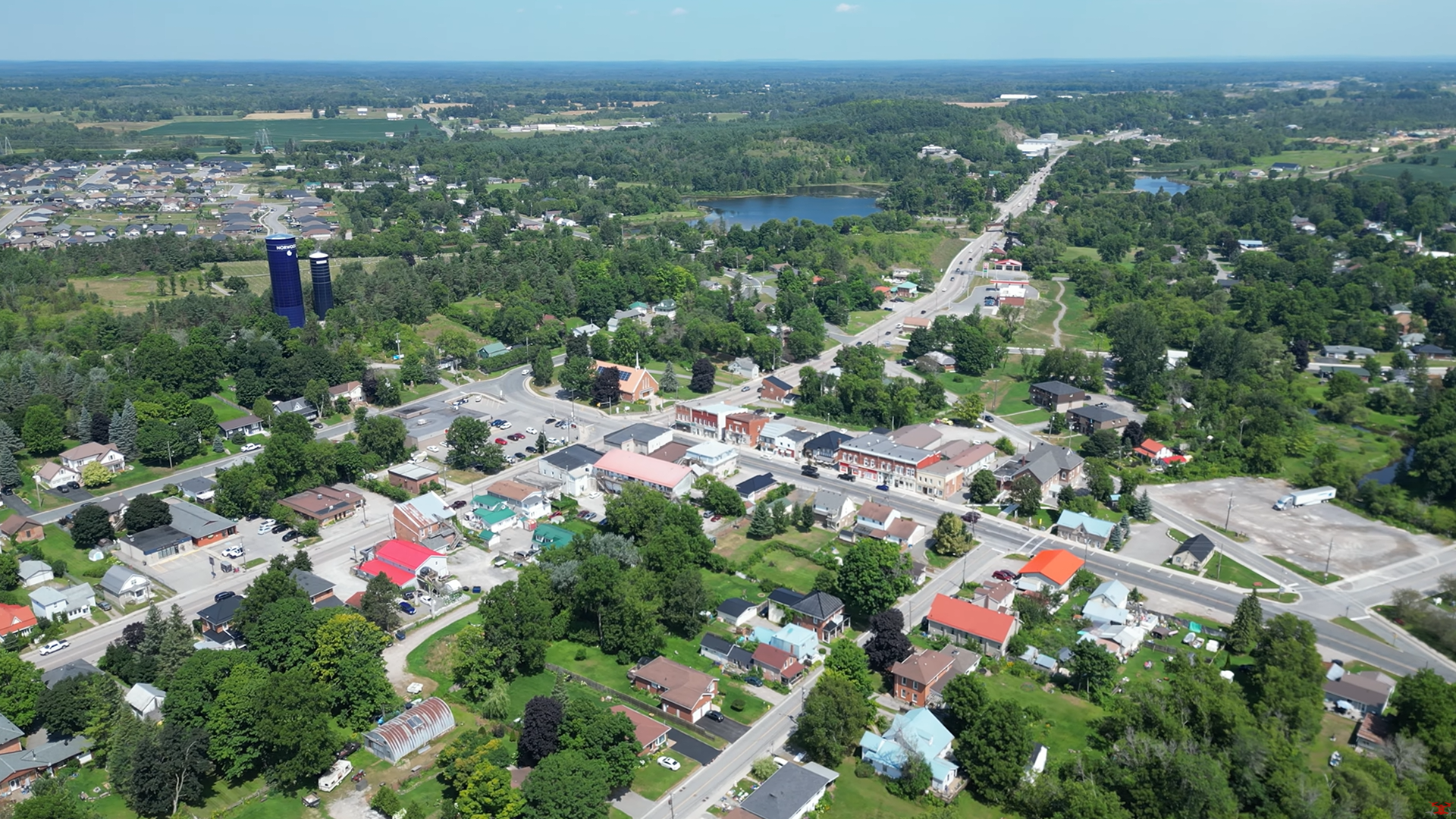
Aerial view of Norwood in 2024

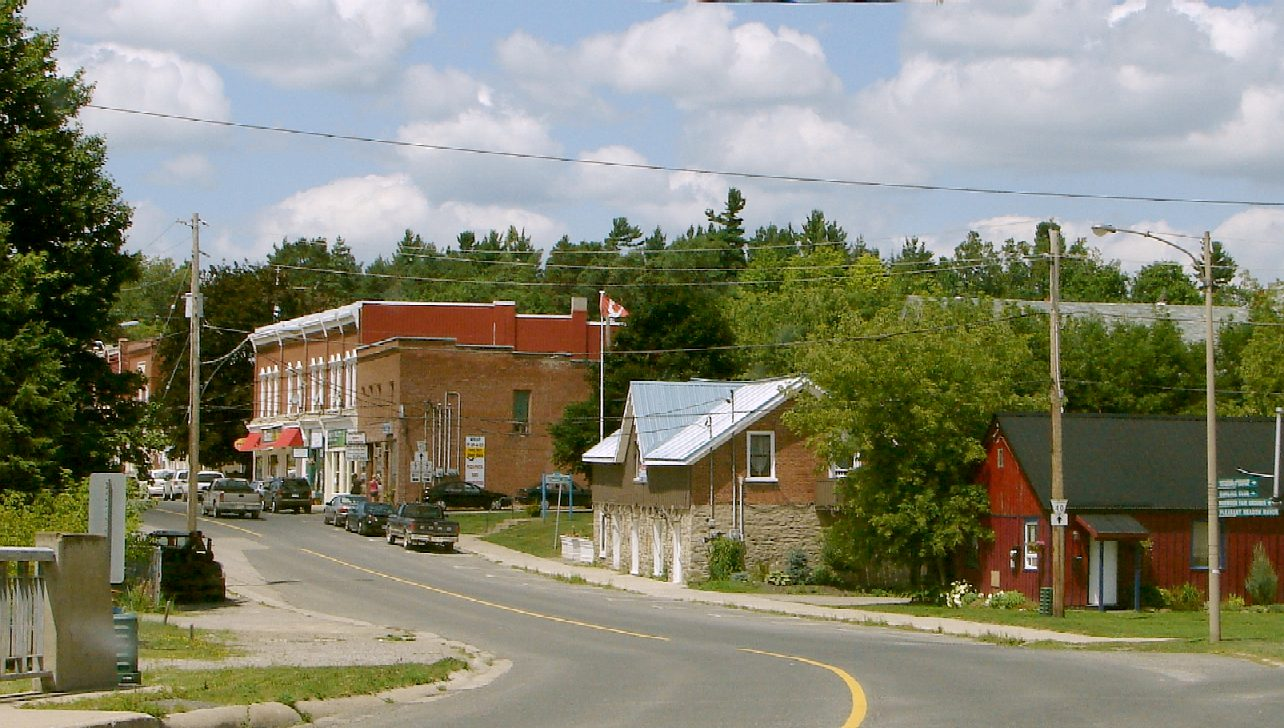
Buildings in Norwood

In 1823, Joseph Keeler, a Major in the colonial militia during the War of 1812, was granted 500 acres of land in Asphodel along the Ouse River as a reward for his services. It was this site that would eventually become Norwood, though during the early decades it was known as Keeler's Mill. In subsequent years Keeler expanded his property through purchasing neighbouring lots until it grew to a size of 2000 acres by 1836. That year, the mill complex was upgraded and expanded with additional machinery, and Keeler had part of his property divided into village lots. Keeler also changed the name of his settlement to Norwood, reflecting the colloquial appellation "North woods". This new village quickly grew, with the first church built that year, and the first store the year after. The first school in Asphodel existed at Keeler's Mill by 1832, four years prior to Keeler's division of his property.

Norwood would steadily grow in prominence, and when the Municipal Act took effect in 1850, Norwood came to house the municipal government of Asphodel. It also came to hold some county offices, such as the Division Court which heard cases from the south-eastern corner of Peterborough County. In 1868 the farmers of the township, having organized themselves into the Norwood Agricultural Society, held the first exhibition in Norwood, which continues to be held annually and is now known as the Norwood Fair. On 1 January 1878 Norwood became incorporated as a village. This made Norwood independent of the township, and so the municipal government of the township moved to Westwood, though a dedicated administrative building there would not be built until 1883.

Historically, there was another community named Norwood, 100 km to the west, which was renamed to Greenwood in 1852.

=== Westwood ===
Despite being the closest site to the original colonial presence in the township, Westwood was the slowest of the Asphodel settlements to develop, with the first mill only being built there in 1832 by Thomas Walker. A second mill was constructed nearby in 1845, which helped the fledgling hamlet grow. By 1858 about 100 people called Westwood home. Walker operated the first post office in the township at his farmstead near his mill. As mentioned, when Norwood separated from the township in 1878, the municipal government for Asphodel was relocated to Westwood, with a municipal building being erected in 1883. Westwood remained the seat of the municipality until amalgamation in 1998.

=== Hastings ===
In 1810 James Crooks, a land speculator residing in Niagara, acquired a large stretch of property alongside the rapids in the Trent River in what was then Percy Township. By 1828 he had expanded this property across the river into Asphodel, and upon this land he built a mill. By 1835 Crooks divided his property, by this time known as Crooks Rapids, in village lots. The colonial government was keen on the creation of a canal system between the Bay of Quinte and Lake Simcoe, which today is known as the Trent-Severn Waterway, and from 1837 through to 1839 a dam and a lock system were constructed to allow watercraft to bypass the rapids. This construction, combined with the creation of a bridge over the river and the site being a point of convergence for Northumberland County's road network, made Crooks Rapids into a transportation hub for the area and the settlement grew rapidly. On 1 April 1874 the settlement, which was bifurcated physically by the Trent and politically by the county line separating Peterborough and Northumberland, was incorporated as the Village of Hastings. The village chose to be tied to Northumberland County, and the north half of the village thus seceded from Peterborough County.

=== Amalgamation ===
In 1995 Ontario elected a Conservative government under Premier Mike Harris, who initiated a wave of municipal mergers known as amalgamations, which reduced the number of municipalities in the province by nearly half, from 850 to 444. As part of this amalgamation wave, on 1 January 1998 the Village of Norwood and the Township of Asphodel were merged to form the Township of Asphodel–Norwood, 120 years to the day from Norwood's original separation from Asphodel. The township government moved back to Norwood, with the municipal office in Westwood becoming home to the local historical society.

== Geography ==
As is the case in the rest of Ontario, Asphodel–Norwood's geography was sculpted by ice. The ice sheet which covered the region during the Wisconsin glaciation retreated approximately 12,000 years ago, and this retreated formed the geographic features of the township. The most prominent of these glacial land forms is the Peterborough Drumlin Field, which covers 2/3 of the township. The drumlins are teardrop shaped hills up to 50 metres high and up to 1 kilometre long. The drumlins are oriented in a northeastern direction reflecting the movement of the ice sheet. The northeast corner of the township is situated upon the Dummer Moraine. Moraines are buildup areas of rocks and soil pushed by glaciers as they move. The soil of the Dummer Moraine is characterized by the presence of an excessive amount of rocks and boulders. The Norwood esker is one of the longest and largest eskers in Peterborough County, with a total length of 32 kilometres. An esker is a ridge of sand and gravel formed within a glacier. The Norwood esker enters Asphodel–Norwood in the northeast corner, passes through Norwood, and continues on into Otonabee-South Monaghan where it terminates at Rice Lake.

Asphodel–Norwood has few major water features. The township is bounded by the Trent River for most of its southern boundary, and by Rice Lake in the southwest corner of the township. The only major river that passes through the township is the Ouse River. The main course of the Ouse has its headwaters in Douro-Dummer, and crosses into Asphodel–Norwood just to the north of Norwood, entering Norwood at the mill pond. The Norwood Mill Pond originated when Keeler dammed the Ouse to power his mill. From there it heads southwest to Westwood, turning south just east of said hamlet to join the Trent River. The West Ouse branch originates in Rotten Lake and enters Asphodel–Norwood 10 kilometres west of the main branch, heading in a generally southern direction towards and then through Westwood, after which it swings eastwards and joins the main branch.

=== Communities ===
The township of Asphodel–Norwood comprises a number of villages and hamlets, including the following communities such as Birdsall, Birdsall Station, Norwood and Westwood.

== Demographics ==
In the 2021 Census of Population conducted by Statistics Canada, Asphodel–Norwood had a population of 4,658 living in 1,821 of its 1,985 total private dwellings, a change of 13.4% from its 2016 population of 4,109. With a land area of 161.62 km^{2} (62.40 sq mi), it had a population density of 28.8/km^{2} (74.6/sq mi) in 2021.

Canada census – Asphodel-Norwood community profile

	2021	2016	2011
Population	4,658 (+13.4% from 2016)	4,109 (1.7% from 2011)	4,041 (-4.9% from 2006)
Land area	161.62 km^{2} (62.40 sq mi)	161.02 km^{2} (62.17 sq mi)	160.98 km^{2} (62.15 sq mi)
Population density	28.8/km^{2} (75/sq mi)	25.5/km^{2} (66/sq mi)	25.1/km^{2} (65/sq mi)
Median age	46.0 (M: 44.4, F: 47.6)	47.4 (M: 46.3, F: 48.4)
Private dwellings	1,985 (total) 1,821 (occupied)	1,635 (total)	1,756 (total)
Median household income	$80,000

References: 2021 2016 2011

Historical census populations – Asphodel–Norwood
Year	Pop.	±%
1996	4,080	—
2001	3,985	−2.3%
2006	4,247	+6.6%
2011	4,041	−4.9%
2016	4,109	+1.7%
2021	4,658	+13.4%
Source: Statistics Canada

Mother tongue (2021):

- English as first language: 94.9%
- French as first language: 1.3%
- English and French as first language: 0.2%
- Other as first language: 3.0%

== Local Government ==
The town's council includes a Mayor, Deputy-Mayor, and three councilors elected on the basis of one per ward.

== Recreation ==
Norwood has a modern single pad arena, a baseball diamond, a skateboard park, a children's splash pad and a playground. The high school has soccer, rugby and football pitches. Norwood currently is home to the Norwood Vipers an OHA Sr. A hockey team. The town hockey teams are referred to as the Norwood Hornets.

=== Minor hockey history ===
The Norwood Hornets Minor Hockey Association (previously known as Norwood Minor Sports) has operated minor hockey programs for more than 80 years in the community of approximately 1,300.

The NMHA has operated out of three arenas since the Association's inception in the 1920s. Originally the minor hockey programs skated in the Trent Valley League (TVL) holding games at the Spring Street Arena located north of Spring Street and south of Hwy. 7 (between Pine and Hwy.45). The Spring Street Arena was an outdoor facility that featured Norwood taking on TVL rivals such as neighboring Havelock, Hastings, Warsaw, Douro, Marmora and Keene.

In the mid-1950s, the G.A. Brethen Coliseum was built originally for use for the Norwood Fair, however, was converted into a hockey arena and was used until the year 2001 when the new Asphodel–Norwood Community Centre opened. Around this time, the Norwood programs participated in the Hastings & District League against newer opponents such as Ennismore, Warkworth and Campbellford.

In the early 1980s, former National Hockey League (NHL) goaltender Marv Edwards settled in Norwood and implemented the Fundamentals In Action (FIA) skills development system. The program paid immediate dividends as the Hornets had unprecedented success from 1983 to 1992—winning seven (7) OMHA titles and participating in twelve (12) OMHA Finals between 1983 and 1994.

It was believed that much of Norwood's minor hockey success was attributed to the Brethen Coliseum's small, tight quarters. The ice surface was measured at 186 feet long by 72 feet wide. (NHL regulation ice is 200 x 85). The Coliseum's ice was approximately 23% smaller than the traditional North American ice surface.

Norwood's OMHA championship success over the years is one of the most successful among centres of its size (the DD and D classification) for communities under 5,000 residents.

The Hornets program has sent several players onto the various levels of Junior levels of hockey, however, the most notable was forward Fred Doherty who played professionally from 1908 until 1919, including stints in the Maritime Professional Hockey League and the National Hockey Association. After World War I, Doherty was called up to the Montreal Canadiens of the NHL and saw action in three games in the 1918–19 campaign for Montreal.

The Hornets have had sixteen (16) O.M.H.A. Championships and seventeen (17) O.M.H.A. Finalists since 1958. 33 of Norwood's OMHA Finals appearances came in a 27-year span from 1983 to 2010

== Education ==
Norwood has four schools in three buildings. Norwood District Public School (elementary), St. Paul's Elementary School (Catholic), Norwood Intermediate Public School (grade 8) and Norwood District High School. Norwood intermediate is now a wing of the High School.

== Notable residents ==
- Fred Doherty, former NHL player
- Matt Walst, Neil Sanderson, Barry Stock and Brad Walst, members of the rock band Three Days Grace
- Brendan McMillan, bassist of the rock band My Darkest Days
- Cale Gontier, bassist of the rock bands Art of Dying and Saint Asonia
- Adam Gontier, current lead vocalist for Saint Asonia and Three Days Grace

== See also ==
- List of municipalities in Ontario
- List of townships in Ontario
