= Adam Gontier =

Canadian singer and guitarist (born 1978)

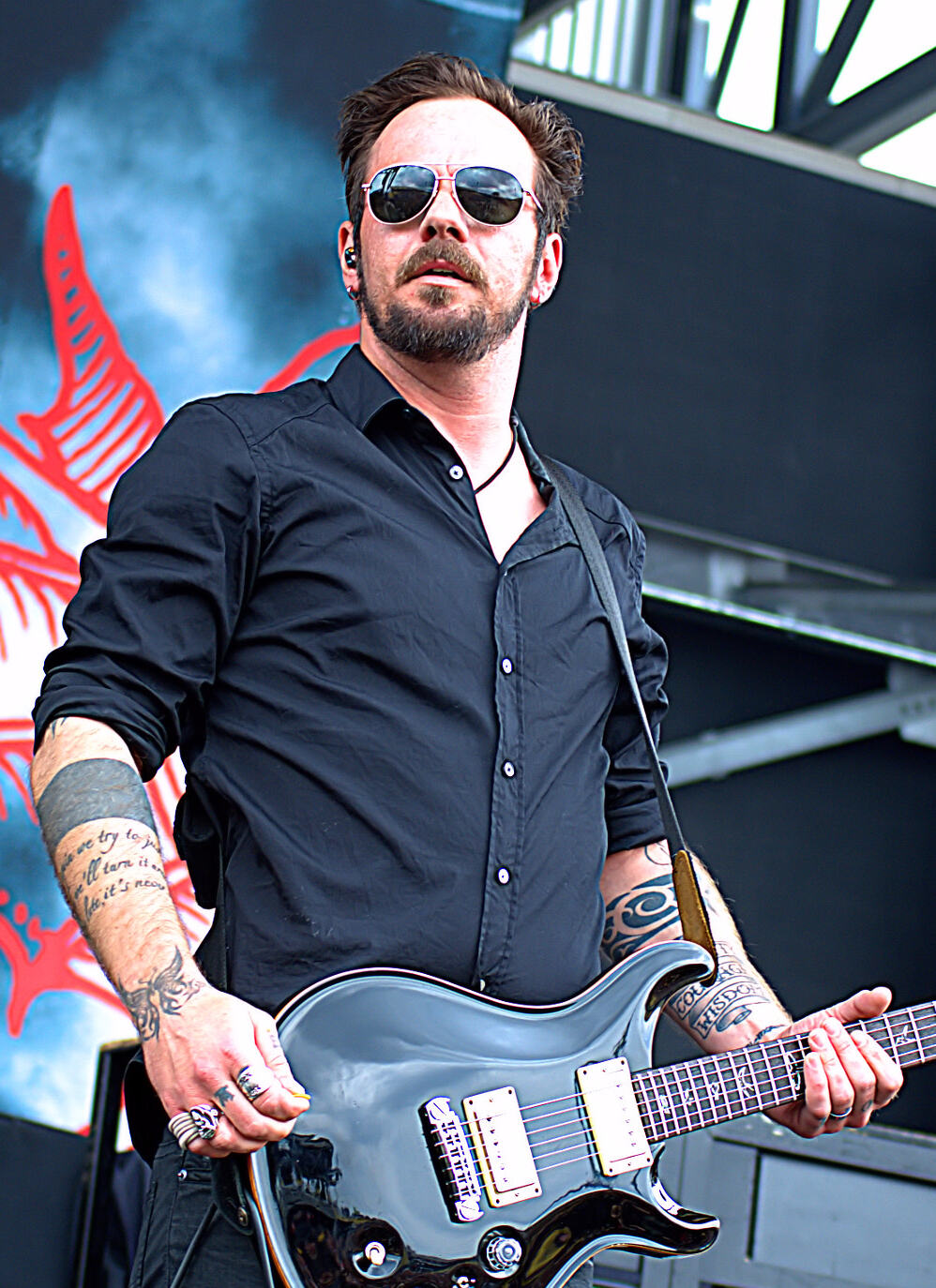
- Gontier with Saint Asonia in 2015
- Born: Adam Wade Gontier; May 25, 1978 (age 48); Peterborough, Ontario, Canada
- Citizenship: Canada; United States
- Occupations: Singer; musician; songwriter
- Years active: 1992–present
- Spouses: Naomi Faith Brewer (m. 2004; div. 2013) Jeanie Marie Larsen (m. 2015)
- Children: 2
- Relatives: Cale Gontier (cousin)
- Musical career
- Genres: Post-grunge; hard rock; alternative rock; alternative metal
- Instruments: Vocals; guitar
- Member of: Three Days Grace; Saint Asonia; Diviidedby
- Formerly of: Big Dirty Band

Adam Wade Gontier (born May 25, 1978) is a Canadian musician who is the co-lead singer and rhythm guitarist for the rock band Three Days Grace. He is also known for his work in Saint Asonia. He co-founded Three Days Grace in 1992, recording four albums with them before parting ways in 2013 and eventually returning in 2024. In addition to his work with Three Days Grace and Saint Asonia, he has been involved in collaborations with other bands including Art of Dying, Apocalyptica, Breaking Benjamin, Skillet, and Thousand Foot Krutch.

== Early life ==
Gontier was born in Peterborough, Ontario on May 25, 1978. He was raised in Markham, Ontario. Shortly after his parents divorced, he moved back to the Peterborough area, where he initially attended Adam Scott Collegiate and Vocational Institute. In 1992, he moved to the Norwood area, and attended Norwood District High School, where he met and befriended Three Days Grace members Neil Sanderson and Brad Walst. Gontier's mother is a professional singer/pianist, and was an influence to him as a musician.

Gontier started playing guitar at the age of 12 and was taught by his cousin Cale's brother Josh. He began writing songs around the age of 14. Gontier has stated that he uses music "as an outlet and release for emotions and feelings." Gontier's influences include Pearl Jam, Alice in Chains, Jeff Buckley, Soundgarden, the Tragically Hip, and Finger Eleven.

== Career ==
=== 1992–2013, 2024–present: Three Days Grace ===
Gontier, along with Sanderson, Walst, Phil Crowe, and Joe Grant, started out as "Groundswell" in Norwood, Ontario, in 1992, while attending high school. In 1997, Gontier, Sanderson, and Walst regrouped as "Three Days Grace". The group was signed to Jive Records after being sought out by the company's then-president Barry Weiss. Their Canadian rock number one debut single, "I Hate Everything About You", and their debut self-titled studio album was released in 2003. Their second studio album, One-X, was released in 2006, debuting at number five on the Billboard 200. Their third studio album, Life Starts Now, was released in 2009 and debuted at number three on the Billboard 200, thus becoming the band's highest-charting album in the US to date. In 2012, the band released their fourth studio album, Transit of Venus and peaked at number five on the Billboard 200.

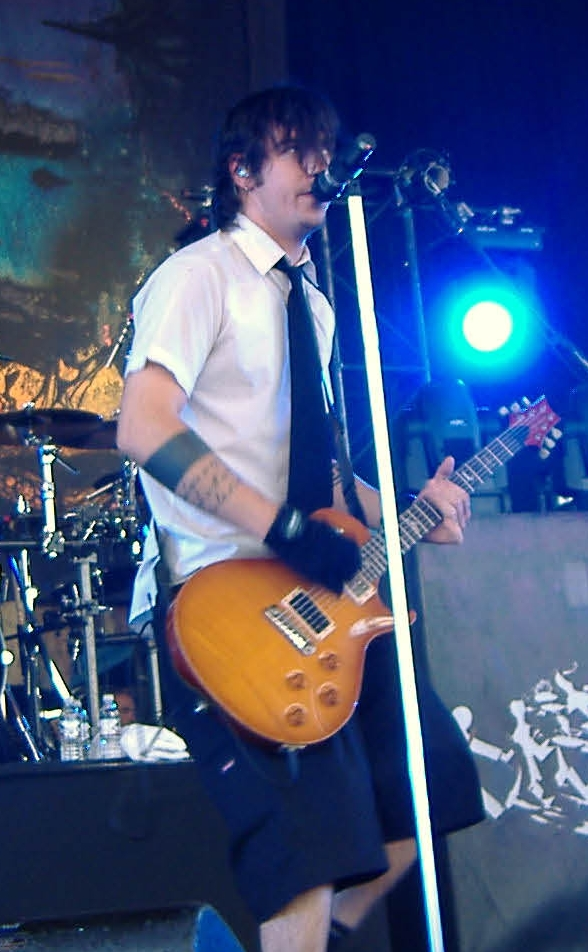
Gontier performing live with Three Days Grace in 2006

On January 9, 2013, Gontier resigned from Three Days Grace. He left as the band was about to embark on a co-headlining tour. Matt Walst from My Darkest Days, the brother of bassist Brad Walst, became the new lead singer. On April 19, 2023, Gontier reunited with Three Days Grace to perform "Never Too Late" and "Riot", before reuniting with them a second time for their Nashville, Tennessee concert on October 10, 2023.

On October 3, 2024, Three Days Grace confirmed Gontier's official return (with Walst also remaining as a singer) and was in the studio recording new music with the band. The group released their eighth studio album and Gontier's first since rejoining the band, Alienation, on August 22, 2025.

=== 2012–2014: Solo career ===
Gontier joined singer and songwriter Martin Sexton on the road during his 2012 "Fall Like Rain" tour, providing opening support as a solo artist. He also joined Citizen Cope for a few shows as a solo act. Gontier continued to do shows and concerts as a solo artist. Several songs have been released, but not as singles. In early March 2013, Gontier publicly announced and launched his Adam Gontier Solo Live Tour.

=== 2015–2025: Saint Asonia ===
In April 2014, Gontier and Staind guitarist Mike Mushok began writing songs together, without the intention of creating a band. They soon garnered the interest of RCA Records. The duo later enlisted former Finger Eleven drummer Rich Beddoe, and former Dark New Day bassist Corey Lowery to complete their lineup. On May 15, 2015, the group released their debut single "Better Place". The band released their debut self-titled studio album on July 31, 2015. In early 2019, the group signed with Spinefarm Records and released their second studio album, Flawed Design, later that year. In 2022, the group released two EPs, Introvert and Extrovert, before releasing both EPs physically as Introvert/Extrovert with bonus tracks on December 9, 2022.

=== Notable works and collaborations ===
Outside of Three Days Grace, Gontier has also written and collaborated with numerous writers, musicians and bands. Some of his collaborations include Daughtry, Ian Thornley, Max Martin, Shaun Morgan, Ben Burnley, Art of Dying, Before the Curtain, and fellow musician and long time friend Grainne Ryan.

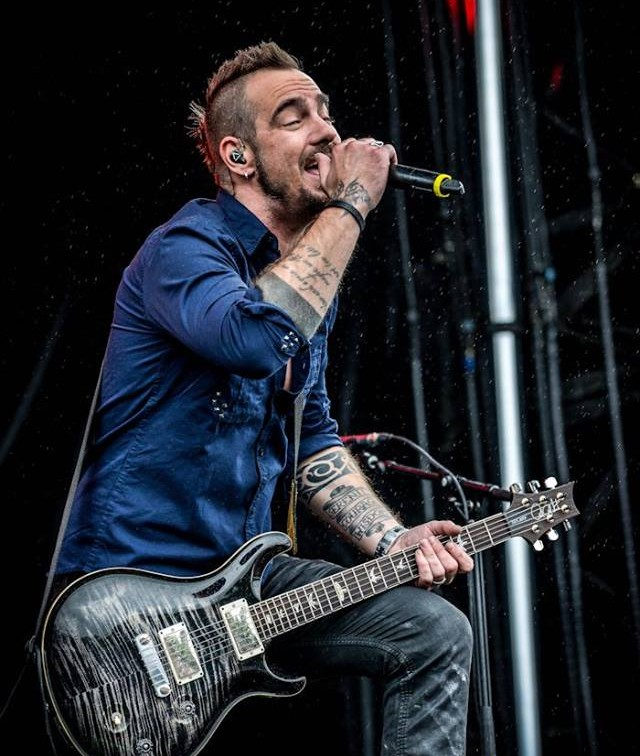
Gontier in 2015

In 2006, Gontier was a member of the rock supergroup Big Dirty Band along with Geddy Lee, Alex Lifeson, Jeff Burrows, Ian Thornley, and Care Failure, covering "I Fought the Law", as part of the Trailer Park Boys movie soundtrack. He has also contributed to a number of other albums. He contributed vocals and musical arrangement on "I Don't Care" on Apocalyptica's album, Worlds Collide in 2007. In 2009, Adam Gontier worked with Daughtry on their second studio album Leave This Town. The song "Back Again" was featured on the physical copy of Daughtry's Leave This Town: The B-Sides EP.

In 2011, Gontier created the record label, Sludge Factory Records, and has signed three acts, one of which is fellow Peterborough band, Before the Curtain. Gontier was also featured on the track "Raining" by fellow Canadian band Art of Dying on their album Vices and Virtues.

On January 24, 2020, Breaking Benjamin released their compilation album, Aurora, that included Gontier on the track "Dance with the Devil". In 2021, Gontier released a song for PUBG Mobile titled, "Tidal Wave". In January 2023, he was featured on Skillet's song "Finish Line", on the deluxe edition of Dominion. Gontier formed a new project called Diviidedby together with former USS MC Jason "Human Kebab" Parsons in April 2023. In late 2023, he was featured on the 2023 version of "Let the Sparks Fly" by Thousand Foot Krutch. Gontier was featured on the single "Why Is Love So Hard" by Peyton Parrish, released in May 2024.

== Awards ==
In 2004, Gontier was named on Chart Attack magazine's "20 Sexiest Canadian Musicians" list. In 2006, Gontier and Three Days Grace won the Billboard Music Awards for Rock Single of the Year. In 2008, Gontier won the BMI Pop Awards. Michael Bell handed him the "Big Time Award", at the 2012 "Wire Awards". Gontier was inducted into the Norwood District High School Hall of Honor in July 2022 along with Brad and Matt Walst.

== Personal life ==
Gontier married Naomi Faith Brewer in May 2004. The couple divorced in 2013. He married Jeanie Marie Larsen in March 2015. His cousin, Cale Gontier, is the bass player for Art of Dying and Saint Asonia. As of 2023, he resides in Nashville, Tennessee.

In 2005, Gontier went into rehabilitation at the CAMH (Centre for Addiction and Mental Health) in Toronto, where he wrote many of the songs for One-X, including "Pain", "Animal I Have Become", "Get Out Alive", "Over and Over", "Never Too Late" and "Gone Forever". A docu-drama about his addiction, Behind the Pain, was released in 2007. Gontier has been open about his struggles with mental health. He stated that he relapsed in 2017 and went into a treatment center. Since then, Gontier has been sober and stated that he has "no plans on going back to a dark place anytime soon."

== Discography ==
=== Groundswell ===
- Wave of Popular Feeling (1995)

=== Three Days Grace ===
- Three Days Grace (2003)
- One-X (2006)
- Life Starts Now (2009)
- Transit of Venus (2012)
- Alienation (2025)

=== Saint Asonia ===
- Saint Asonia (2015)
- Flawed Design (2019)
- Introvert/Extrovert (2022)

=== Singles ===
==== As lead artist ====
Title	Year	Album
"Tidal Wave"	2021	Non-album single

==== As featured artist ====
Title	Year	Peak chart positions					Certification	Album
Title	Year	CAN	CAN Rock	FIN	US	US Main. Rock	Certification	Album
"I Don't Care" (Apocalyptica featuring Adam Gontier)	2008	59	4	13	78	1	MC: Gold; RIAA: 2× Platinum	Worlds Collide
"Wars" (Cevilain featuring Adam Gontier)	2021	—	—	—	—	—		Non-album single
"Let the Sparks Fly" (Thousand Foot Krutch featuring Adam Gontier)	2023	—	—	—	—	—		The End Is Where We Begin: Reignited
"Why Is Love So Hard" (Peyton Parrish featuring Adam Gontier)	2024	—	—	—	—	—		Non-album single
"—" denotes releases that did not chart.

=== Other appearances ===
Title	Year	Artist(s)	Album	Notes	Ref.
"Back Again"	2010	Daughtry	Leave This Town: The B-Sides	Songwriter	
"Raining"	2011	Art of Dying	Vices and Virtues	Composer, featured artist	
"Dance with the Devil"	2020	Breaking Benjamin	Aurora	Featured artist	
"Finish Line"	2023	Skillet	Dominion	Featured artist	
