= Riot (Three Days Grace song) =

2007 single by Three Days Grace

- Promotional CD disc

Single by Three Days Grace

from the album One-X
- Released: November 6, 2007
- Length: 3:28
- Label: Jive
- Songwriters: Adam Gontier; Brad Walst; Neil Sanderson; Barry Stock
- Producer: Howard Benson

Three Days Grace singles chronology
"Never Too Late" (2007)	"Riot" (2007)	"Break" (2009)

Audio video
- "Riot" on YouTube

"Riot" is a song by Canadian rock band Three Days Grace. It was released on November 6, 2007, as the fourth and final single from their second studio album, One-X (2006). The song peaked at No. 65 on the Canadian Hot 100, No. 12 and No. 21 on Billboard's Mainstream Rock and Modern Rock Tracks charts, respectively. The single was certified Platinum in Canada, 4× Platinum in the United States, Silver in the United Kingdom, and Gold in New Zealand.

== Background and recording ==
Three Days Grace vocalist Adam Gontier stated in an interview with Loudwire that Chino Moreno of Deftones was almost featured in the song. He is quoted saying: "We were in LA recording it and they were pretty close by. I'd always wanted to work with him and we were just such huge Deftones fans. We still are. We reached out to his management, asked if he'd be into it and he was, but for whatever reason it didn't work out."

== Composition and lyrics ==
"Riot" was written by Adam Gontier and was produced by Howard Benson. According to the sheet music published at Musicnotes.com, by Alfred Music Publishing, the track runs at 132 BPM and is in the key of F major. Gontier's range in the song spans from the notes A4 to C6. Lead guitarist Barry Stock said the riff was inspired by "Black Sabbath".

Lyrically, the song is about rebelling against one's own feelings of being overburdened and frustration to take action and make change. It is one of only a few songs by the band to feature profanity.

== Track listing ==
CD single
No.	Title	Length
1.	"Riot" (clean edit)	3:27

Promotional single
No.	Title	Length
1.	"Riot"	3:28

== Personnel ==
Credits for "Riot" adapted from album's liner notes.

Three Days Grace

- Adam Gontier – lead vocals, rhythm guitar
- Barry Stock – lead guitar
- Brad Walst – bass
- Neil Sanderson – drums, backing vocals

Production

- Howard Benson – producer
- Chris Lord-Alge – mixing
- Ted Jensen – mastering
- Mike Plotnikoff – recording
- Michael Tedesco – A&R

== Charts ==
=== Weekly charts ===
Weekly chart performance for "Riot"
Chart (2007–2008)	Peak position
Canada Hot 100 (Billboard)	65
Canada Rock (Billboard)	15
Ukraine Airplay (Tophit)	138
US Alternative Airplay (Billboard)	21
US Mainstream Rock (Billboard)	12

=== Year-end charts ===
Year-end chart performance for "Riot"
Chart (2008)	Position
US Mainstream Rock (Billboard)	28

== Certifications ==
Certifications for "Riot"
Region	Certification	Certified units/sales
Canada (Music Canada)	Platinum	80,000^{‡}
New Zealand (RMNZ)	Gold	15,000^{‡}
United Kingdom (BPI)	Silver	200,000^{‡}
United States (RIAA)	4× Platinum	4,000,000^{‡}
^{‡} Sales+streaming figures based on certification alone.
