= Pain (Three Days Grace song) =

Single by Three Days Grace

from the album One-X
- Released: September 19, 2006
- Genre: Alternative rock; emo
- Length: 3:22
- Label: Jive
- Songwriters: Adam Gontier; Barry Stock; Brad Walst; Neil Sanderson; Gavin Brown
- Producer: Howard Benson

Three Days Grace singles chronology
"Animal I Have Become" (2006)	"Pain" (2006)	"Never Too Late" (2007)

Music video
- "Pain" on YouTube

"Pain" is a song by the Canadian rock band Three Days Grace. It was released on September 19, 2006, as the second single from their second studio album, One-X. The song topped the Canada Rock, as well as the US Mainstream Rock and Alternative Airplay charts. It was certified Platinum by Music Canada in February 2018, 4× Platinum by the Recording Industry Association of America in November 2025, and Gold by the Recorded Music NZ.

== Background and composition ==
"Pain" was written by Adam Gontier and was produced by Howard Benson. The song came together when the group was in Bancroft, Ontario, at their friend's cottage in Stiemer's Lake. It was influenced from Gontier's rehab stint in 2005 after struggling with addiction to OxyContin. According to Gontier, the song describes "feeling like you're constantly numb to things around you, thanks to your own actions, and it's about being sick of that feeling." He also stated that the chorus has "one of the strongest lyrics" on the album.

According to the sheet music published at Musicnotes.com, by Alfred Music Publishing, the track runs at 81 BPM and is in the key of G major. Gontier's range in the song spans from the notes E4 to B5.

== Versions ==
There are three versions of the song "Pain". The first version is the album version of song. The second version is an acoustic version of the song that is available for download along with an acoustic version of "Animal I Have Become" and the main version of "Pain". It is included on the Pain EP, a digital exclusive release. The third version runs 3:28 long and is titled "Pain (Pleasure Mix)". The song was serviced to contemporary hit radio on June 3, 2008.

== Chart performance ==
"Pain" peaked at number one on the Billboard Modern Rock Tracks chart for four consecutive weeks. It stayed on the chart for 30 weeks where the prior single "Animal I Have Become" and next single, "Never Too Late" stayed longer on the chart at 41 weeks and 43 weeks respectively. On the Billboard Hot Mainstream Rock Tracks chart, it reached number one and stayed there for thirteen consecutive weeks. It also reached a peak of number 44 on the Billboard Hot 100, becoming their first single to chart in the top 50 of the Hot 100 and their highest-charting single to date.

"Pain" also peaked at number one on the Canadian rock chart for two weeks. The song peaked at number 52 on the Canadian Hot 100. It also reached number one on the MuchMusic Countdown.

== Music video ==
The music video for "Pain" was directed by Tony Petrossian and was shot in August 2006. It was released on the day before the single's release. The video features the band playing the song in what looks to be an abandoned mansion or warehouse, and it also features shots of troubled youths who are lip-syncing to the song. At the end of the song, everyone (youths and the band members alike) is shown to be tattooed with a red "X" on the back of their necks, signifying the name of the parent album, One-X.

== Awards and nominations ==
"Pain" was nominated for "Best International Video By A Canadian" at the 2007 MuchMusic Video Awards and won the BMI Awards in 2006, along with their other single "Animal I Have Become". The song also won a BDS Certified Spin Award based on the 100,000 spins it received. Billboard ranked the song at number 25 on their "Greatest of All Time Mainstream Rock Songs" list.

== Track listing ==
Canada CD single
No.	Title	Length
1.	"Pain"	3:22

US CD single
No.	Title	Length
1.	"Pain" (radio mix)	3:22
2.	"Pain" (album version)	3:22

Pain (EP)
No.	Title	Length
1.	"Pain"	3:22
2.	"Pain" (stripped acoustic version)	3:18
3.	"Animal I Have Become" (stripped acoustic version)	3:44

== Personnel ==
Credits for "Pain" adapted from the album's liner notes.

Three Days Grace

- Adam Gontier – lead vocals
- Brad Walst – bass guitar, backing vocals
- Neil Sanderson – drums, organ, backing vocals
- Barry Stock – lead guitar

Additional musicians

- Howard Benson – keyboards

Production

- Howard Benson – producer, programming
- Chris Lord-Alge – mixing
- Ted Jensen – mastering
- Mike Plotnikoff – recording
- Casey Stone – engineering

== Charts ==
=== Weekly charts ===
2006–2007 weekly chart performance for "Pain"
Chart (2006–2007)	Peak position
Canada Hot 100 (Billboard)	52
Canada CHR/Top 40 (Billboard)	38
Canada Rock (Billboard)	1
US Billboard Hot 100	44
US Alternative Airplay (Billboard)	1
US Mainstream Rock (Billboard)	1
US Pop 100 (Billboard)	47

2021 weekly chart performance for "Pain"
Chart (2021)	Peak position
Czech Republic Rock (IFPI)	3

=== Year-end charts ===
Year-end chart performance for "Pain"
Chart (2007)	Position
Canada Rock (Radio & Records)	2
US Alternative Songs (Billboard)	8
US Mainstream Rock Songs (Billboard)	3

=== All-time charts ===
All-time chart performance for "Pain"
Chart (All-time)	Position
US Mainstream Rock Songs (Billboard)	25

== Certifications ==
Certifications for "Pain"
Region	Certification	Certified units/sales
Canada (Music Canada)	Platinum	80,000^{‡}
New Zealand (RMNZ)	Gold	15,000^{‡}
United States (RIAA)	4× Platinum	4,000,000^{‡}
^{‡} Sales+streaming figures based on certification alone.

== Release history ==
Release dates and formats for "Pain"
Region	Date	Format	Version	Label	Ref(s).
Various	September 19, 2006	Digital download	Main	Jive	
United States	September 25, 2006	Alternative radio	Main	Jive	
United States	September 25, 2006	Mainstream rock	Main	Jive	
Canada	November 7, 2006	CD	Main	Jive	
United States	January 30, 2007	Contemporary hit radio	Main	Jive	
Various	February 25, 2007	Digital download	Acoustic EP	Jive	
Various	October 14, 2008	Digital download	Pleasure Mix	Jive	
