= Post-grunge =

Music genre

- Other names: Scrunge
- Stylistic origins: Grunge; hard rock; alternative rock
- Cultural origins: Early to mid-1990s, United States

Other topics
- Alternative metal; nu metal; soft grunge (music); grungegaze

Post-grunge is a musical offshoot of grunge that has a less abrasive or intense tone than traditional grunge. Originally, the term was used derisively and indicated mid-1990s alternative rock bands such as Bush, Candlebox, Collective Soul, Live, Foo Fighters, and Silverchair, that emulated the original sound of grunge.

In the late 1990s, post-grunge became a more clearly defined style that combined the sound and aesthetic of grunge with more commercially accessible songwriting, rising to prominence that lasted into the 2000s. Bands such as Foo Fighters, Creed, Matchbox Twenty, 3 Doors Down, Puddle of Mudd, Nickelback, Seether, and Staind achieved mainstream success in this second wave. Some bands in this wave also had crossover with the alternative metal and nu metal genres.

== Characteristics ==
During the 1990s, a post-grunge sound emerged that emulated the attitudes and music of grunge, particularly its thick, distorted guitars, but with a less intense and less abrasive tone. Unlike many early grunge bands, post-grunge bands often worked through major record labels. Post-grunge music tends to be in mid-tempo and is noted for having "a polished, radio-ready production", oftentimes with pop song structures, and incorporated influences from other genres such as classic rock, pop rock, alternative metal, and nu metal. Tim Grierson of About.com wrote that musically, post-grunge bands "split the difference between plaintive ballads and aggressive rockers, resulting in songs that combine the two extremes into a sad-eyed, propulsive middle ground". On some occasions, post-grunge music features both an electric guitar and an acoustic guitar playing simultaneously. Post-grunge tends to have production quality that is more polished than grunge. Hence, Graham Hartmann of Metal Injection noted that the genre's second wave "had a vice grip on rock radio from the mid-to-late 2000s—arguably the last time a wave of rock experienced mainstream popularity."

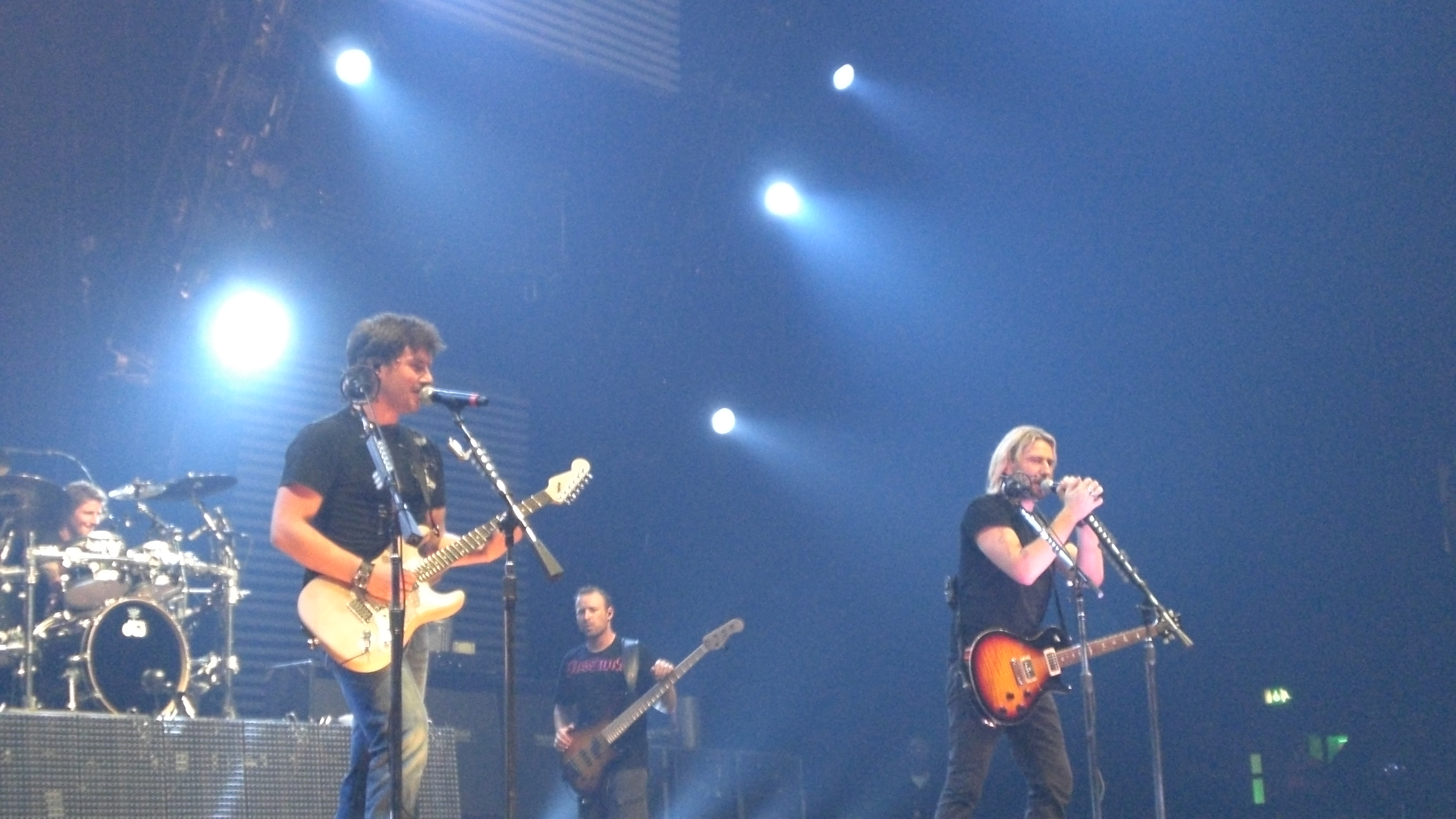
Post-grunge band Nickelback in 2008

A "major rift" between grunge and post-grunge is in the lyrical substance of the music; grunge often expressed emotion through loose metaphors or third-person narratives, while post-grunge was known for being direct and blunt. While describing lyrics that are common in post-grunge, Sasha Geffen of Consequence of Sound wrote that post-grunge "plunged directly into the 'I.' " Geffen also wrote that most post-grunge songs that achieved mainstream success "call after a prospective or past companion in the first person". Post-grunge lyrics also tend to be about topics such as relationships, romance and drug addiction. According to Geffen, "grunge's frontmen posed with their addictions; post-grunge's songwriters sought redemption for them". Geffen then states that post-grunge songs "fit the mold of songs made for ... teenage boys and girls" who were "longing for a distant someone".

== Etymology ==
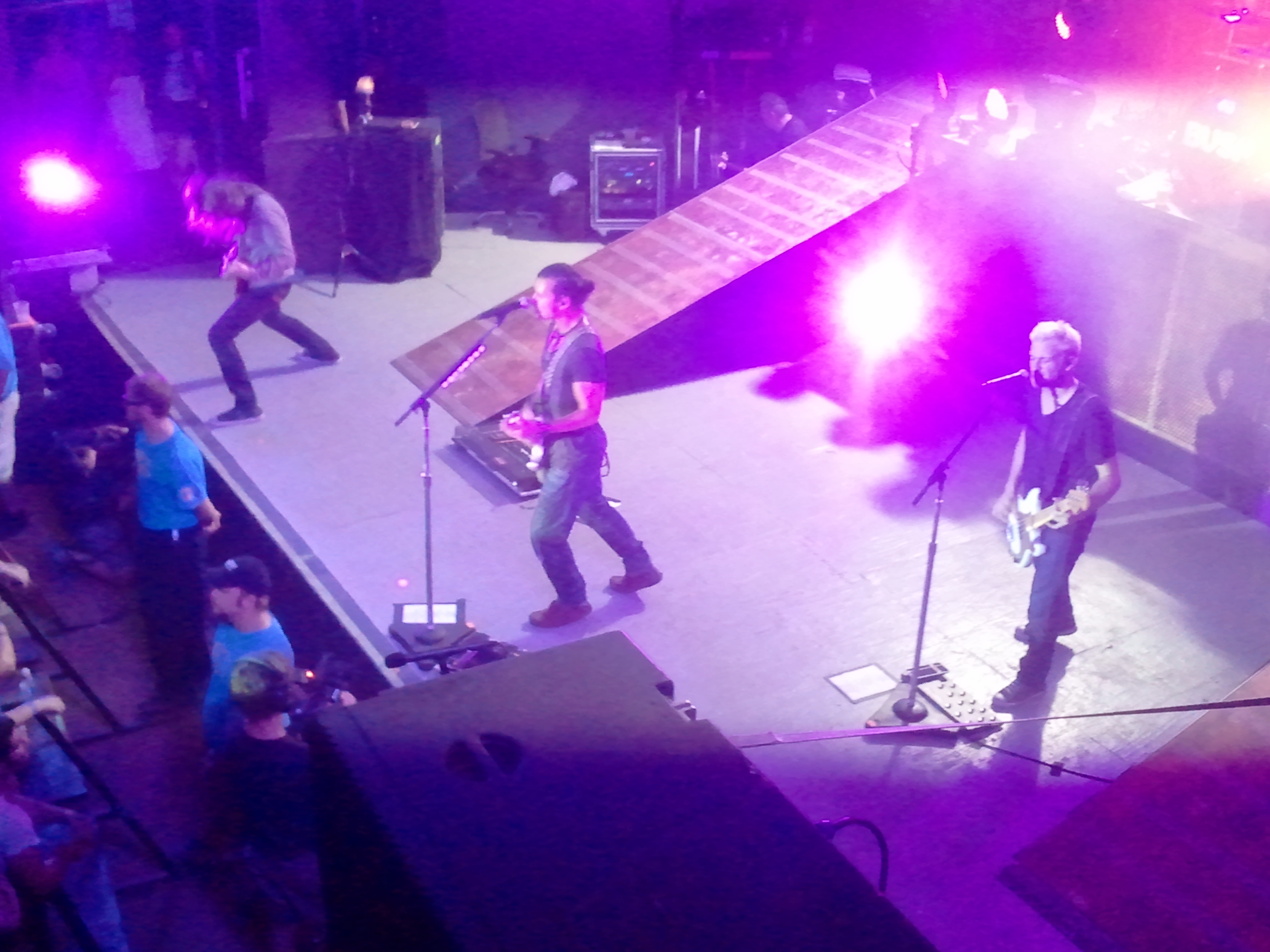
British band Bush (pictured) were described by Matt Diehl of Rolling Stone as "the most successful and shameless mimics of Nirvana's music".

Originally, post-grunge was a label that was meant to be almost pejorative, suggesting that mid-1990s bands labelled as post-grunge were simply musically derivative, or a cynical response to the "authentic" rock movement of grunge. When grunge became a mainstream genre through bands such as Nirvana and Pearl Jam, record labels started signing bands with similar sonic identities, such as Bush, Candlebox and Collective Soul. In the late 1990s and early 2000s, post-grunge morphed via newer bands like Creed and Nickelback, becoming a more well-defined style that combined characteristics of grunge with a more commercially accessible sound. Grierson wrote that "bands like Nirvana and Pearl Jam were beloved partly because of their perceived integrity in avoiding the mainstream," whereas "Post-grunge, by comparison, seemed to exist in order to court that very audience."

A popular synonym for post-grunge during the mid-1990s was "scrunge", a term coined by Spin editor Charles Aaron in a November 1995 article. In his article, he named Bush, Collective Soul, Better Than Ezra, Filter, Dandelion, Garbage, Hum, Hootie & the Blowfish, Foo Fighters, Silverchair, Tripping Daisy and Jen Trynin as examples. Aaron also stated that record label insiders had already been referring to the genre as "corporate alternative". "Scrunge" continued into the 2000s, used in a 2001 review in Slant Magazine to refer to Alanis Morissette.

=== "Butt rock" ===
In the 2010s, the derogatory term "butt rock", which was previously applied to 1980s glam metal and hard rock bands such as Mötley Crüe, Def Leppard, and Poison, gained traction when applied to many second-wave post-grunge artists. Notably, the term would be used to refer to the likes of Nickelback, Creed, Puddle of Mudd, Shinedown, Flyleaf and Hinder. Graham Hartmann of Metal Injection stated that the term "usually refers to the second wave of post-grunge music, where bands like Bush and Candlebox ultimately turned into Nickelback and Seether." This second-wave the term came to describe embraced elements of nu metal. Angelica Leicht of Houston Press said: "Butt-rock is that musical stank on your shoe that you can’t get off. It’s one part aggro noise, one part self-indulgent and whiny singer, and somehow a whole lot of douche."

The origins of the term are debated, with some attributing it to the alleged radio slogan "Nothing but rock". The term "butt rock" is usually used by individuals critical of what they perceive to be derivative musicianship, overly clichéd or angsty lyrics, and over-reliance on raspy vocals (often described as imitations of Pearl Jam's Eddie Vedder). Eva Zhu of CBC said butt rock is "a style of music that manages to be as popular as it is hated." According to Erica Banas of WMMR, some consider butt rock to be rock music that is "watered down both musically and lyrically" in order to maximize radio airplay and mainstream success. She added: "Perhaps, Butt Rock is truly in the ear of the beholder. It might just be a derogatory term rock fans use on bands they don't like." Butt rock has also been referred to as a subgenre in itself, or a microgenre. A related term for second-wave post-grunge is "divorced dad rock".

== History ==
=== 1993–1997: First wave and rise in popularity ===
Even at the height of their popularity, after the release of Nevermind (1991) brought grunge to international attention, Nirvana experienced increasing problems, partly caused by Kurt Cobain's drug addiction and growing dissatisfaction with commercial success. In late 1992, Cobain was photographed in a T-shirt with 'Grunge is Dead' printed on its front at which point the genre's decline started to be widely discussed. Cobain's suicide in 1994, as well as Pearl Jam's touring problems, marked a decline for grunge that year. Problems of addiction for Layne Staley of Alice in Chains led to the band cancelling scheduled dates in 1995. Addiction and legal problems for Scott Weiland of Stone Temple Pilots led to the band having touring problems, causing the band to tour their album Purple for only four months, and their follow up album Tiny Music... Songs from the Vatican Gift Shop for only 6 weeks.

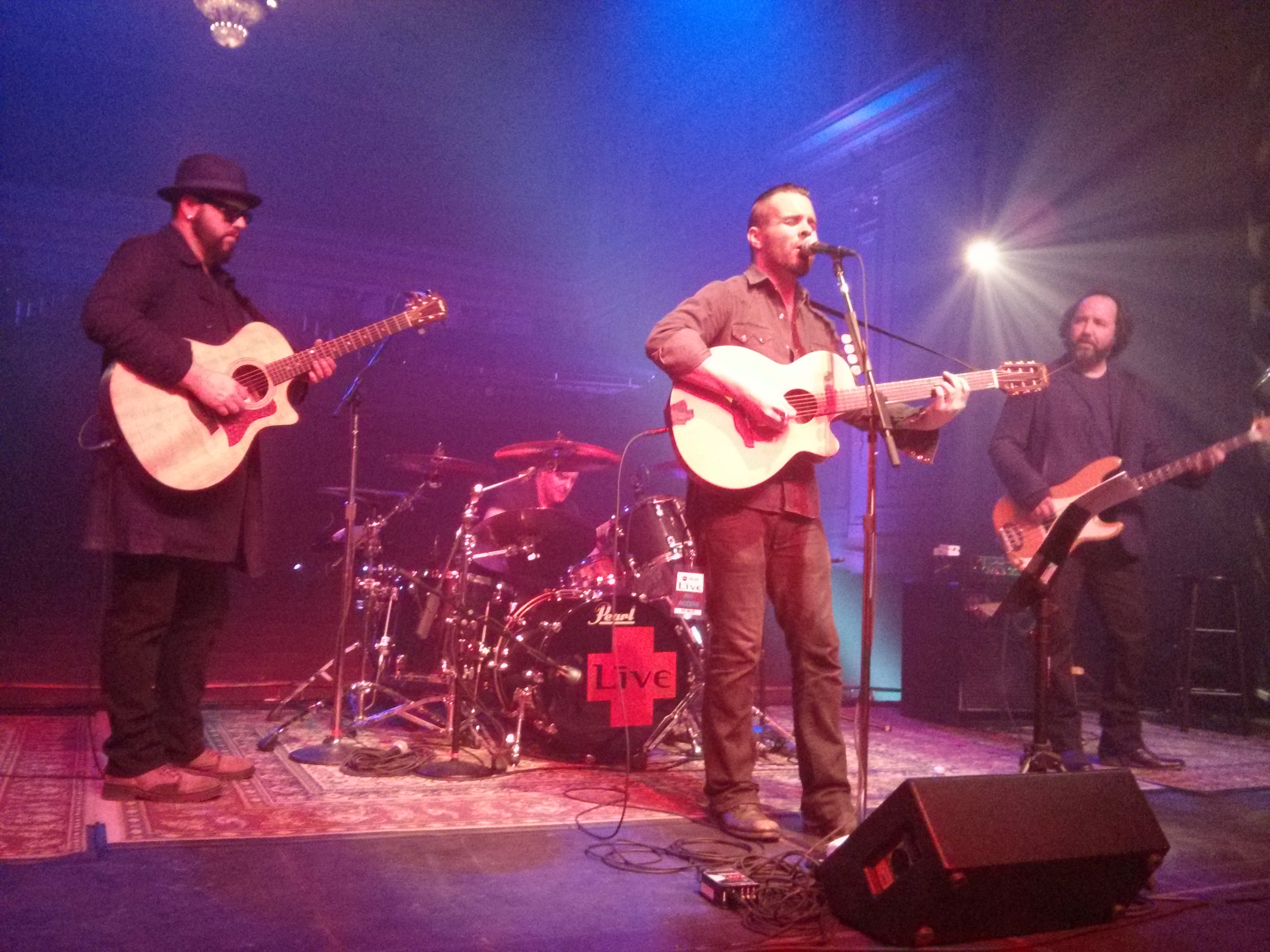
Live, one of the first post-grunge bands, performing in 2013

As the original grunge movement began to fade, major record labels began signing and promoting bands emulating the genre in a more mainstream style, dubbed by some writers as "post-grunge". Though bands such as Bush and Candlebox have been categorized as grunge, both bands have also been categorized as post-grunge. Collective Soul and Live are two other bands categorized as post-grunge that emerged along with Bush and Candlebox. Bush, Candlebox, Collective Soul and Live all achieved mainstream success; Candlebox's self-titled album (1993) was certified 4× platinum by the Recording Industry Association of America (RIAA) and, according to Nielsen SoundScan, sold at least 4,000,000 copies. Its song "Far Behind" peaked at number 18 on the Billboard Hot 100. Collective Soul's song "Shine" peaked at number 11 on the same chart and was certified gold by the RIAA in September 1994. The band's album Hints Allegations and Things Left Unsaid (1993) was certified 2× platinum by the RIAA, and their self-titled 1995 album was certified 3× platinum by the RIAA.

Bush's debut studio album Sixteen Stone (1994) was certified 6× platinum by the RIAA and the band's second studio album Razorblade Suitcase (1996), which peaked at number 1 on the Billboard 200, was certified 3× platinum by the RIAA. Carl Williott of Stereogum called Bush's album Sixteen Stone "a harbinger of post-grunge's pop dominance". Live's album Throwing Copper (1994) was certified 8× platinum by the RIAA, and the band's album Secret Samadhi (1997) was certified 2× platinum by the RIAA. Both Throwing Copper and Secret Samadhi peaked at number 1 on the Billboard 200. Consequence of Sound's Paolo Ragusa credits Throwing Copper with starting post-grunge and shifting rock music to a new direction after the death of Kurt Cobain by combining some harder rock influences with clearer vocals, softer guitar melodies, and the production of Jerry Harrison to make a distinct sound.

In 1995, former Nirvana drummer Dave Grohl's newer band Foo Fighters released their self-titled debut album, becoming one of the most commercially successful rock bands in the United States, aided by considerable airplay on MTV. Like grunge bands such as Nirvana, Pearl Jam, Soundgarden, and Alice in Chains, the post-grunge band Candlebox was from Seattle, but post-grunge was marked by a broadening of its geographical base, with bands such as York, Pennsylvania's Live, Atlanta, Georgia's Collective Soul, Australia's Silverchair, and England's Bush.

=== 1997–2010: Second wave and peak popularity ===
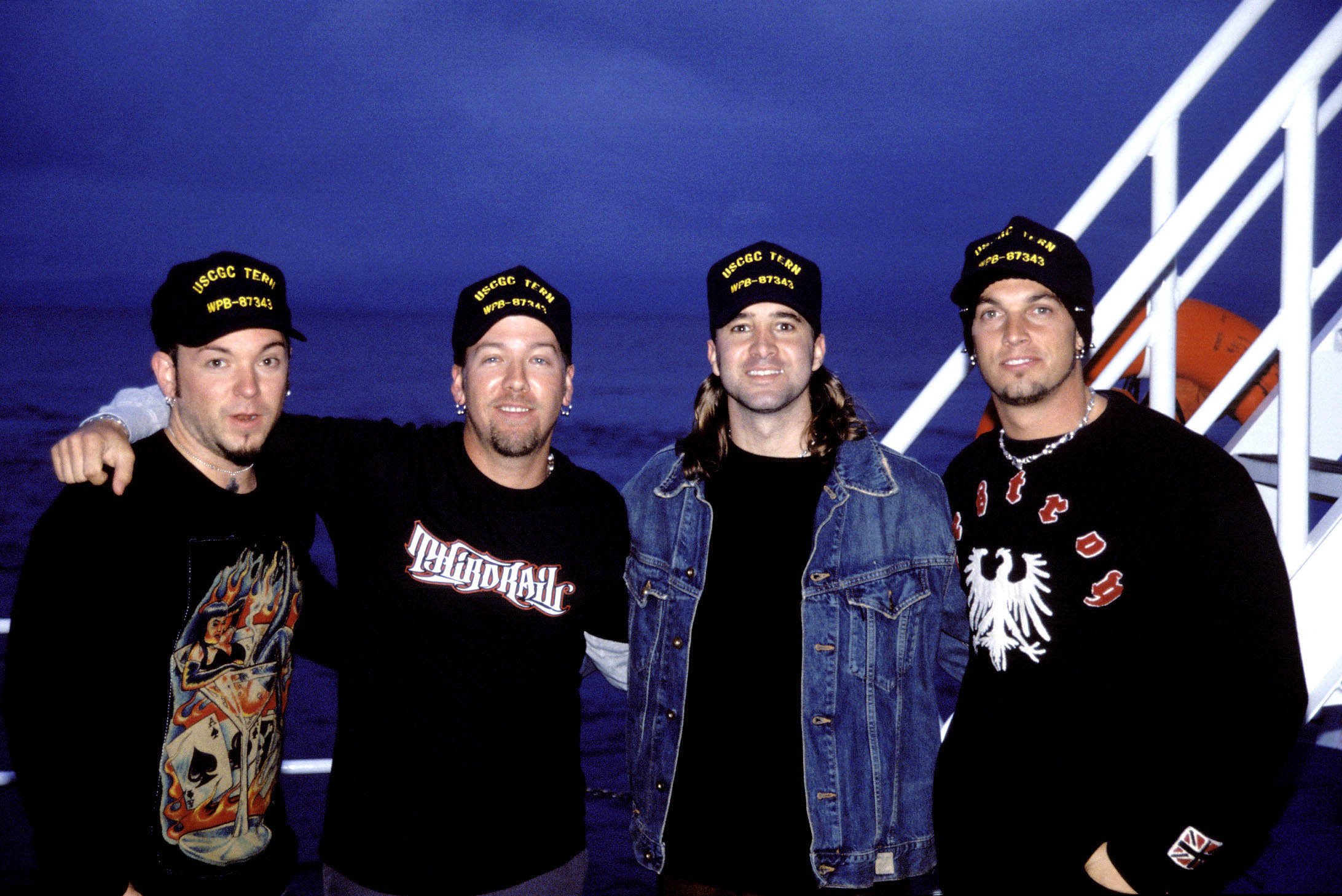
Post-grunge band Creed in 2002

The 1997 breakup of Soundgarden was seen by some as the end of the original grunge movement. Post-grunge then morphed in the late 1990s and 2000s, gaining further popularity with newer acts such as Creed, Matchbox Twenty, Days of the New, Fuel, Oleander, Godsmack, 3 Doors Down, Puddle of Mudd, Staind, Nickelback, Seether, Three Days Grace, Switchfoot, 12 Stones, Breaking Benjamin, Shinedown, Stone Sour, Hinder, Daughtry, and Skillet. This wave retained some of the angst and anger of the earlier artists but also had more conventional anthems, narratives, and romantic songs. Creed's albums My Own Prison (1997) and Weathered (2001) were both certified 6× platinum by the RIAA. Weathered sold at least 6,400,000 copies in the United States. Creed's album Human Clay, released in 1999, was certified diamond by the RIAA and sold at least 11,690,000 copies in the United States. Human Clay's song "With Arms Wide Open" peaked at number 1 on the Billboard Hot 100. Matchbox Twenty's 1996 debut album, Yourself or Someone Like You, was a success in 1997 and 1998 on the strength of radio singles "Push" and "3AM"; it was certified 12× platinum by the RIAA. The Foo Fighters' second album The Colour and the Shape, which is considered a post-grunge album, became a hit and was certified Platinum by the RIAA having sold at least two million copies in the United States.

Nickelback broke into the mainstream in the early 2000s; their song "How You Remind Me" peaked at number 1 on the Billboard Hot 100. The Nickelback album that featured the song, Silver Side Up, was certified 6× platinum by the RIAA and sold at least 5,528,000 copies in the United States. Nickelback's next album, The Long Road, was certified 3× platinum by the RIAA and sold at least 3,591,000 copies in the United States. The album's song "Someday" peaked at number 7 on the Billboard Hot 100 and number 1 on both the Canadian Singles Chart and the Adult Top 40 chart. Nickelback's album All the Right Reasons was certified 6× platinum by the RIAA fourteen months after being released. Four years after being released, the album was certified 8× platinum by the RIAA. In March 2017, All the Right Reasons was certified diamond by the RIAA. Staind's album Break the Cycle peaked at number 1 on the Billboard 200 and sold at least 716,000 copies in its release week, and, according to Nielsen SoundScan, sold at least 4,240,000 copies in 2001. Break the Cycle's song "It's Been Awhile" peaked at number 5 on the Billboard Hot 100.

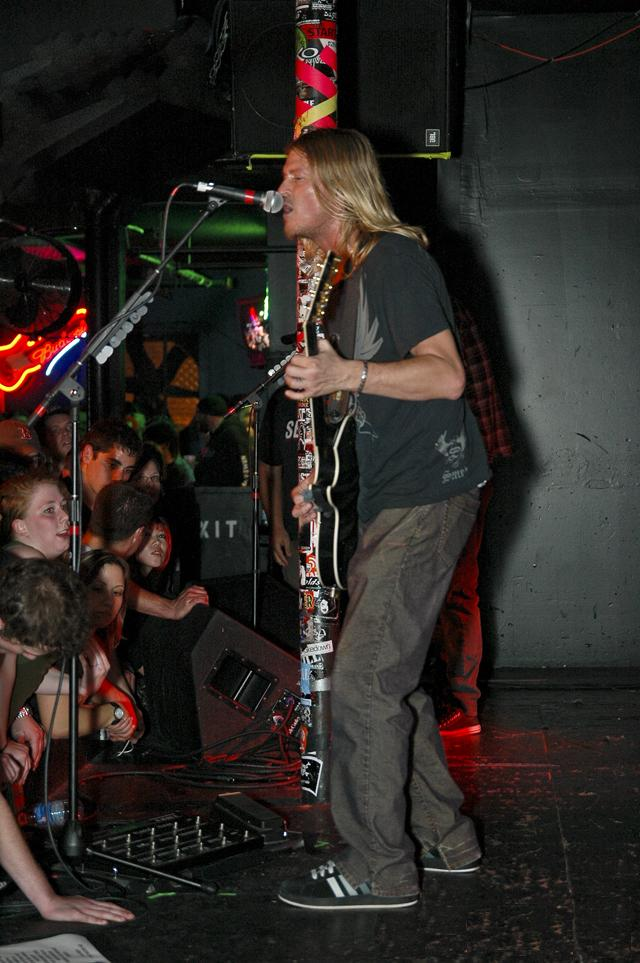
Puddle of Mudd vocalist Wes Scantlin in 2008

3 Doors Down's debut studio album The Better Life (2000) was certified 6× platinum by the RIAA and sold at least 5,653,000 copies in the United States. The Better Life's song "Kryptonite" peaked at number 3 on the Billboard Hot 100 and number 1 on the Mainstream Top 40 chart. 3 Doors Down's second studio album Away from the Sun was certified 4× platinum by the RIAA and sold at least 3,863,000 copies in the United States. Lifehouse achieved mainstream success in the early 2000s; their song "Hanging by a Moment", which peaked at number 2 on the Billboard Hot 100, was the most played song on the radio in 2001. Puddle of Mudd broke into the mainstream in the early 2000s; their album Come Clean was certified 3× platinum by the RIAA and the album's songs "Blurry" and "She Hates Me" both reached very high positions on the Billboard Hot 100. "Blurry" peaked at number 5 on the Billboard Hot 100 and "She Hates Me" peaked at number 13 on the Billboard Hot 100. "She Hates Me" also peaked at number 7 on the Top 40 Mainstream chart. The band Default became popular with their song "Wasting My Time". It peaked at number 13 on the Billboard Hot 100.

The post-grunge band Cold's song "Stupid Girl" peaked at number 87 on the Billboard Hot 100. Post-grunge band Crossfade's song "Cold" peaked at number 81 on the Billboard Hot 100, number 23 on the Top 40 Mainstream chart, number 39 on the Pop 100 chart, number 28 on the Pop 100 Airplay chart, and number 57 on the Hot Digital Songs chart. It was certified gold by the RIAA in December 2006. Crossfade's self-titled album was certified platinum by the RIAA in August 2005. Three Days Grace broke into the mainstream with their 2003 self-titled album; their song "I Hate Everything About You" peaked at number 55 on the Billboard Hot 100 and number 28 on the Pop Songs chart. Another single from the album, "Just Like You", peaked at number 55 on the Billboard Hot 100 and number 1 on both the Mainstream Rock chart and the Modern Rock Tracks chart.

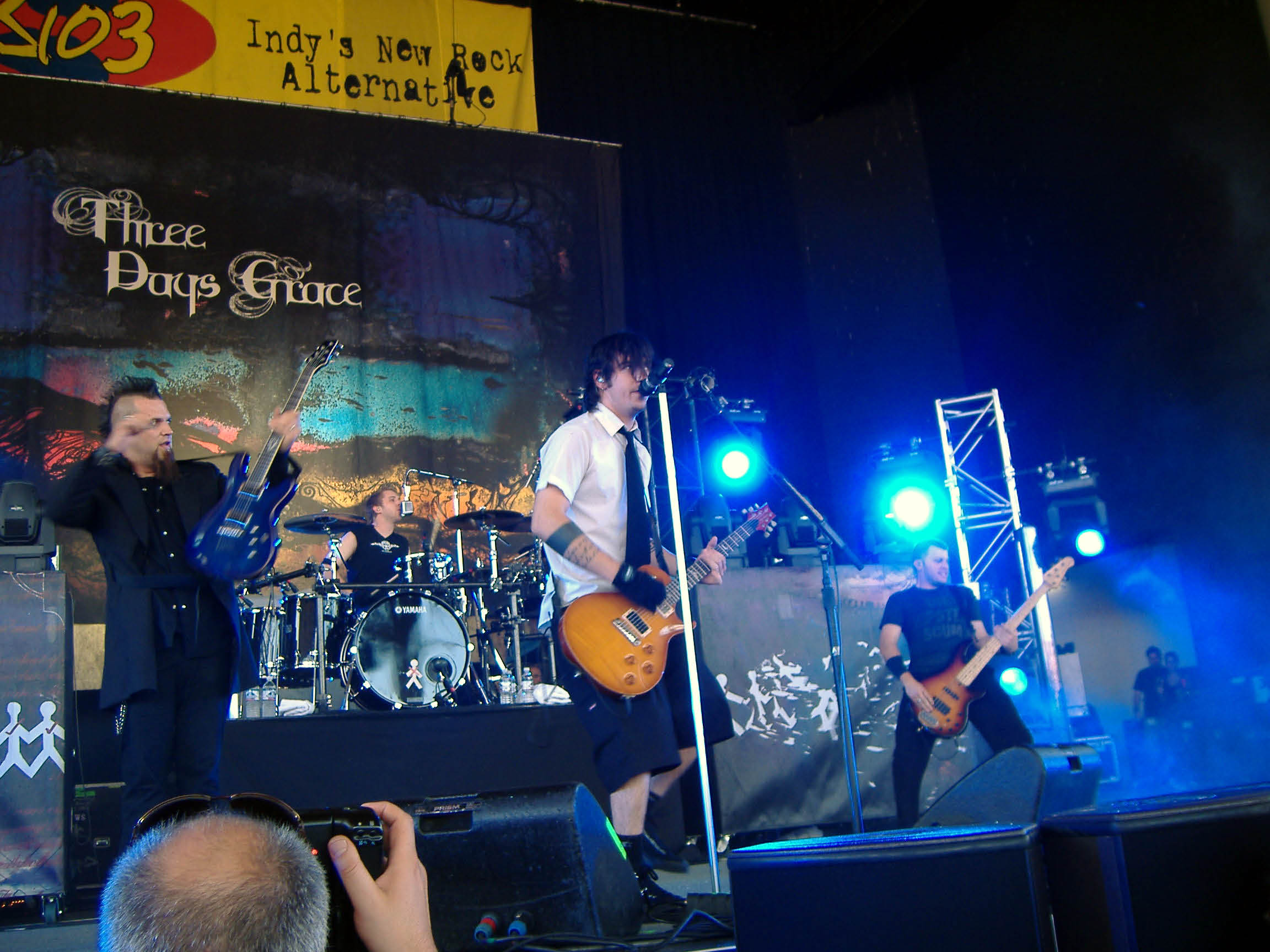
Three Days Grace in 2006

In 2006, Three Days Grace released their album One-X, which was certified 3× platinum by the RIAA. The album's song "Pain" peaked at number 44 on the Billboard Hot 100, number 47 on the Pop 100 chart and number 35 on the Hot Digital Songs chart. One-X's song "Never Too Late" peaked at: number 71 on the Billboard Hot 100, number 12 on the Top 40 Mainstream chart, number 19 on the Pop 100 chart, number 17 on the Pop 100 Airplay chart, number 30 on the Hot Digital Songs chart, number 18 on the Hot Canadian Digital Singles chart, number 13 on the Adult Top 40 chart and number 1 on the Hot Adult Top 40 Recurrents chart. Daughtry broke into the mainstream in 2006 with the release of their self-titled debut album. Stephen Thomas Erlewine of AllMusic noted the post-grunge sound of the album. It sold at least 5,040,000 copies in the United States. The band Flyleaf's song "All Around Me" peaked at: number 40 on the Billboard Hot 100, number 12 on the Top 40 Mainstream, number 17 on the Pop 100, number 15 on the Pop 100 Airplay, number 38 on the Hot Digital Songs and number 23 on the Adult Top 40. Flyleaf's self-titled album was certified platinum by the RIAA.

== See also ==
- List of post-grunge bands
