= Barry Stock =

Canadian guitarist (born 1974)

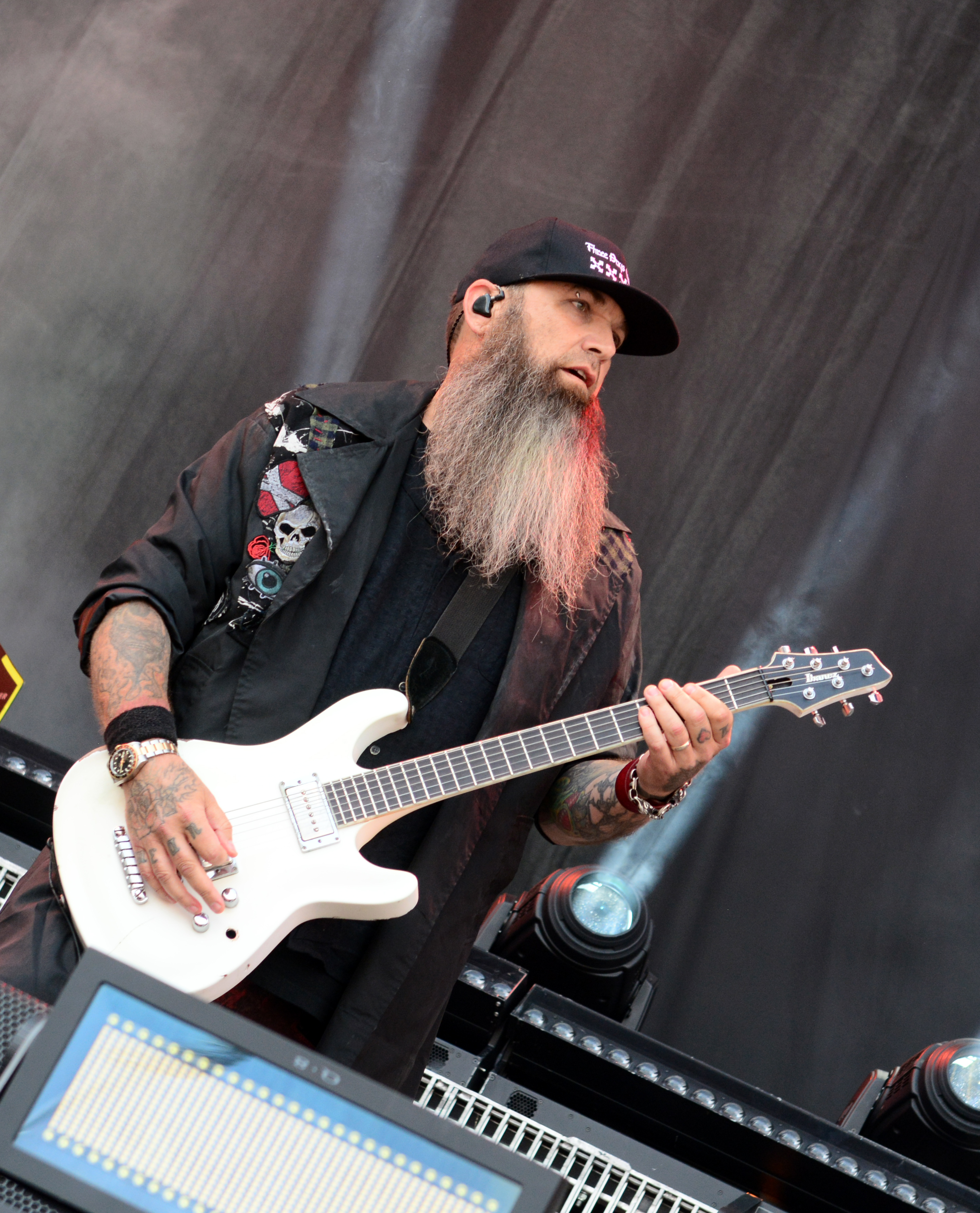
- Stock performing with Three Days Grace in 2023

Background information
- Born: April 24, 1974 (age 52); Belgium
- Origin: Norwood, Ontario, Canada
- Genres: Post-grunge; hard rock; alternative metal; alternative rock; nu metal
- Occupation: Musician
- Instrument: Guitar
- Years active: 2001–present
- Label: Jive
- Member of: Three Days Grace

Barry James Stock (born April 24, 1974) is a Canadian musician. He is the lead guitarist of the Canadian rock band Three Days Grace.

== Early life ==
Stock was born in Belgium and was raised in Caledon, Ontario. At a young age, Stock was introduced to bands such as Black Sabbath, Van Halen and AC/DC. He credits his three older brothers for him listening to '70s rock and wanted to learn guitar after hearing "Stranglehold" by Ted Nugent. Stock grew up as a self taught guitarist and originally played drums first. He bought his first guitar when he was 13 which was a Raven Telecaster copy. He would spend time in his room playing music before playing in bands and as he got older, started focusing more on songwriting.

== Career ==
Stock joined Three Days Grace in 2003, shortly after the band's self-titled debut studio album was released. Stock's addition in Three Days Grace made the band a four-piece. He is featured on seven of the band's studio releases: One-X (2006), Life Starts Now (2009), Transit of Venus (2012), Human (2015), Outsider (2018), Explosions (2022) and Alienation (2025).

At the 2010 Juno Awards, Stock presented April Wine with their induction into the Canadian Music Hall of Fame. Stock is the founder and CEO of MEAN Clothing Company. The clothing is rock music/military inspired. There is also a MEAN Beard division. Stock's interests in addition to music include hunting and the outdoors.

Stock uses Schecter, Ibanez and PRS guitars, but prefers an Ibanez SZ320. Stock also has an Ibanez Custom Shop baritone, which was one of two made for him around the band's 2006 album, One-X. Owning a collection of Ibanez guitars, he has also been seen using an Ibanez SZ4020FM Prestige. Since the discontinuation of the SZ series in 2008, Stock has started to use other guitars in the Ibanez line such as the ART series, Darkstone series, and Iceman as of 2025. He uses Marshall Amplification and various effect pedals including an Ibanez Tube Screamer, mostly by Digitech. On the Live at the Palace DVD he revealed he uses Diezel Vh4 Amplifiers.

Some of Stock's guitar influences include Paul Gilbert, Yngwie Malmsteen, Tony MacAlpine, Tony Iommi, Ritchie Blackmore, Stephen Carpenter of Deftones and Daron Malakian from System of a Down. He uses an Ibanez Tube Screamer for guitar solos.

== Personal life ==
Stock married his wife Heather. Stock revealed he served 48 hours in jail following a DWI after a concert. Stock also had a heart attack on stage. During a performance in Detroit in 2013, Stock was playing "The Good Life" and started to feel discomfort, but originally mistook it as heartburn. However, after he finished the show, his bandmates advised him to seek treatment and he decided to visit a nearby hospital, Beaumont. After receiving treatment, Stock began living a healthier lifestyle, quitting smoking after the heart attack. Stock currently resides in Southern Indiana.

== Discography ==
- One-X (2006)
- Life Starts Now (2009)
- Transit of Venus (2012)
- Human (2015)
- Outsider (2018)
- Explosions (2022)
- Alienation (2025)

=== Other appearances ===
Title	Year	Artist(s)	Album	Notes	Ref.
"Looking for a Place (We've Never Been)"	2001	April Wine	Back to the Mansion	Additional guitar	
"Again"	2012	My Darkest Days	Sick and Twisted Affair	Additional guitar	
"Taxi"	2016	Dani Rosenoer	Monkey Prison	Additional guitar	
"Children of Night"	2022	Jonathan Young	Non-album single	Additional guitar	
