= List of awards and nominations received by Three Days Grace =

Three Days Grace awards and nominations
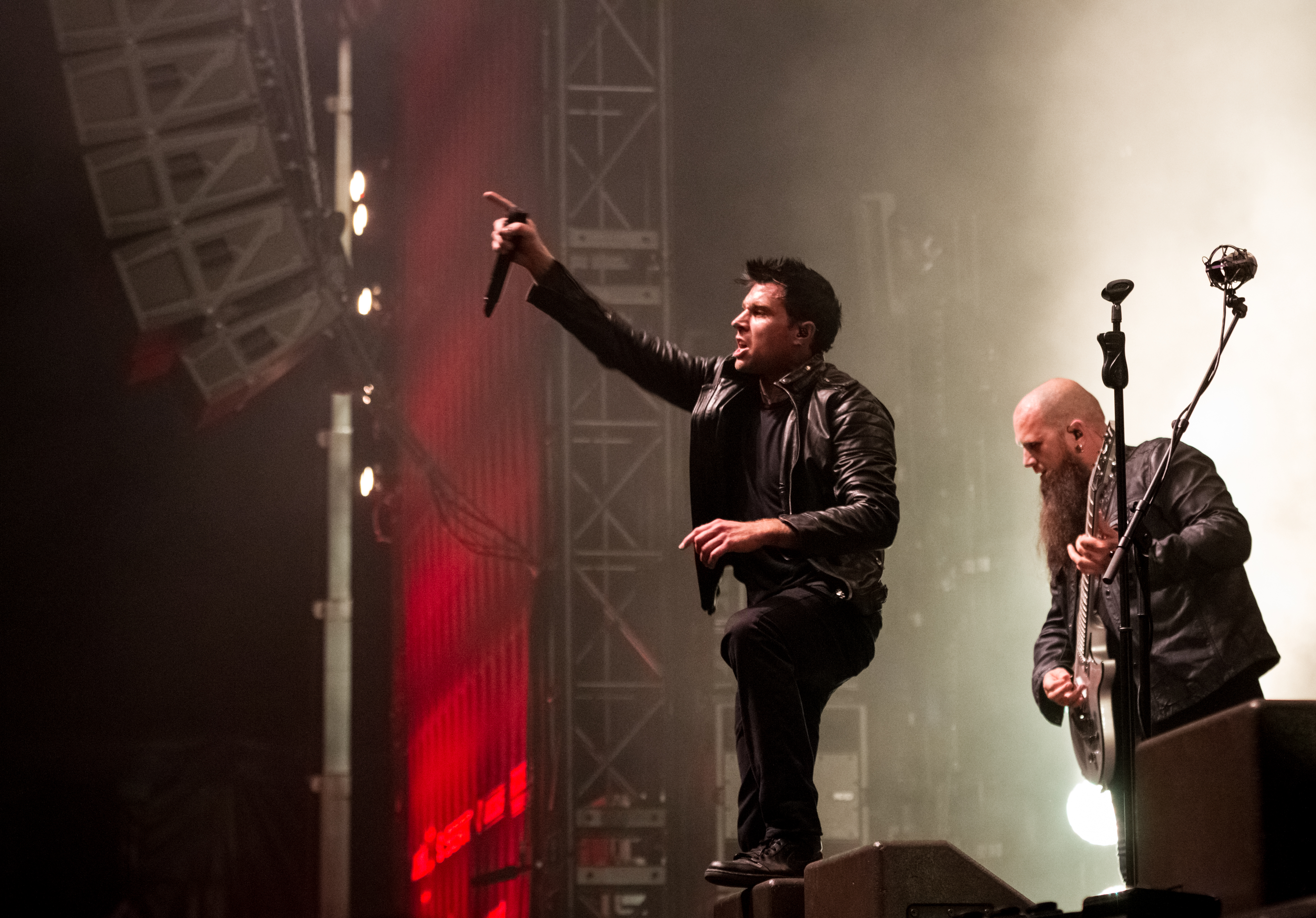
- Three Days Grace performing live in 2015
Awards and nominations
Award	Wins	Nominations
BDS Spin Award	7	7
Billboard Music Awards	1	3
BMI Awards	2	2
Canadian Radio Music Awards	0	1
CASBY Awards	2	3
FMQB Awards	1	1
Genero Awards	0	1
MuchMusic Video Awards	0	8
iHeartRadio Music Awards	1	6
Juno Awards	1	13
Loudwire Music Awards	3	5
MTV Video Music Awards	0	1
Mediabase Awards	2	2
Pollstar Awards	0	1
Radio Music Awards	0	2
Socan Awards	7	7

Totals (Note: Certain award groups do not simply award one winner. They acknowledge several different recipients, have runners-up, and have third place. Since this is a specific recognition and is different from losing an award, runner-up mentions are considered wins in this award tally. For simplification and to avoid errors, each award in this list has been presumed to have had a prior nomination.)
- Wins: 27
- Nominations: 65

Three Days Grace are a Canadian rock band consisting of members Adam Gontier, Barry Stock, Neil Sanderson, Brad Walst and Matt Walst. They have been nominated for numerous awards including the Billboard Music Awards, the Juno Awards and the MuchMusic Video Awards.

== BDS Spin Award ==
The Broadcast Data Systems, better known as BDS, is a service that tracks monitored radio, television and internet airplay of songs based on the number of spins and detections. Three Days Grace received seven BDS Spin awards.

Year	Nominated	Award	Result	Ref.
2005	"Home"	100,000 spins	Won	
2006	"Just Like You"	200,000 spins	Won	
2006	"Animal I Have Become"	100,000 spins	Won	
2007	"Pain"	100,000 spins	Won	
2007	"I Hate Everything About You"	300,000 spins	Won	
2007	"Never Too Late"	100,000 spins	Won	
2011	"Lost in You"	50,000 spins	Won	

== Billboard Music Awards ==
The Billboard Music Awards are honours given out annually by Billboard, a publication covering the music business and a music popularity chart. Three Days Grace received one Billboard Music award out of the three nominations.

Year	Nominated	Award	Result	Ref.
2004	Three Days Grace	Modern Rock Artist of the Year	Nominated	
2006	"Animal I Have Become"	Rock Single of the Year	Won	
2006	"Animal I Have Become"	Modern Rock Single of the Year	Nominated	

== BMI Awards ==
The BMI Film & TV Awards are accolades presented annually by Broadcast Music, Inc., honouring songwriters, composers, and music publishers in various genres. Three Days Grace received 2 BMI awards.

Year	Nominated	Award	Result	Ref.
2008	"Animal I Have Become"	BMI Pop Awards	Won	
2008	"Pain"	BMI Pop Awards	Won	

== Canadian Radio Music Awards ==
The Canadian Radio Music Awards is an annual series of awards presented by the Canadian Association of Broadcasters that was part of Canadian Music Week. Three Days Grace received one Canadian Radio Music Awards nomination.

Year	Nominated	Award	Result	Ref.
2008	Three Days Grace	Fan Choice	Nominated	

== Casby Awards ==
The CASBY Awards were a Canadian awards ceremony for independent and alternative music, presented annually by Toronto, Ontario radio station CFNY, currently branded as 102.1 The Edge. Three Days Grace received two Casby awards out of the three nominations.

Year	Nominated	Award	Result	Ref.
2003	Three Days Grace	Favourite New Artist	Won	
2010	"Break"	Best Single of the Year	Nominated	
2010	Life Starts Now	Favorite New Album	Won	

== FMQB Awards ==
Friday Morning Quarterback (better known as FMQB) was a trade magazine which covered the radio and music industries in the United States. Its coverage included programming, management, promotion, marketing, and airplay for music formatted radio. Three Days Grace earned one FMQB Award.

Year	Nominated	Award	Result	Ref.
2007	"Animal I Have Become"	Rock Song of the Year	Won	

== Genero Awards ==
Three Days Grace was nominated for one Genero Award.

Year	Nominated	Award	Result	Ref.
2013	"Misery Loves My Company"	Video of the Year	Nominated	

== MuchMusic Video Awards ==
The iHeartRadio MMVAs were an annual awards show broadcast on Much to honour the year's best music videos that was last held in 2018. Three Days Grace have received eight MuchMusic Video Award nominations.

Year	Nominated	Award	Result	Ref.
2004	"I Hate Everything About You"	Best Rock Video	Nominated	
2004	"I Hate Everything About You"	Favourite Canadian Group	Nominated	
2007	"Pain"	Best International Video By A Canadian	Nominated	
2007	"Pain"	People's Choice: Favourite Canadian Group	Nominated	
2007	"Never Too Late"	Best Video	Nominated	
2007	"Never Too Late"	Best Rock Video	Nominated	
2010	"Break"	Best Post-Production	Nominated	
2010	"Break"	Best Rock Video	Nominated	

== iHeartRadio Music Awards ==
The iHeartRadio Music Awards is a music awards show that celebrates music heard throughout the year across iHeartMedia radio stations nationwide and on iHeartRadio, iHeartMedia's digital music platform. Three Days Grace won one iHeartRadio Music award out of the six nominations.

Year	Nominated	Award	Result	Ref.
2016	Three Days Grace	Rock Artist of the Year	Nominated	
2016	"I Am Machine"	Rock Song of the Year	Nominated	
2019	Three Days Grace	Rock Artist of the Year	Won	
2023	Three Days Grace	Rock Artist of the Year	Nominated	
2023	"So Called Life"	Rock Song of the Year	Nominated	
2026	Three Days Grace	Rock Artist of the Year	Nominated	

== Juno Awards ==
The Juno Awards, more popularly known as the JUNOS, are awards presented annually to Canadian musical artists and bands to acknowledge their artistic and technical achievements in all aspects of music. Three Days Grace received one Juno award out of the fifteen nominations.

Year	Nominated	Award	Result	Ref.
2004	"I Hate Everything About You"	Producer of the Year	Won	
2004	Three Days Grace	New Group of the Year	Nominated	
2007	Three Days Grace	Group of the Year	Nominated	
2007	One-X	Album of the Year	Nominated	
2010	Life Starts Now	Best Rock Album	Nominated	
2011	Three Days Grace	Group of the Year	Nominated	
2011	"Break"	Recording Engineer of the Year	Nominated	
2014	Transit of Venus	Best Rock Album	Nominated	
2016	Three Days Grace	Group of the Year	Nominated	
2019	Three Days Grace	Group of the Year	Nominated	
2019	Outsider	Album of the Year	Nominated	
2019	Outsider	Rock Album of the Year	Nominated	
2023	Explosions	Rock Album of the Year	Nominated	
2026	Alienation	Rock Album of the Year	Nominated	
2026	Three Days Grace	Group of the Year	Nominated	

== Loudwire Music Awards ==
Loudwire is an American online media magazine that covers news of hard rock and heavy metal artists. It is owned by media and entertainment business Townsquare Media. Three Days Grace received three Loudwire Music awards out of the five nominations.

Year	Nominated	Award	Result	Ref.
2012	"Chalk Outline"	Rock Song of the Year	Won	
2014	"Painkiller"	Rock Song of the Year	Won	
2015	Human	Rock Album of the Year	Nominated	
2015	"Human Race"	Rock Song of the Year	Nominated	
2015	Three Days Grace	Best Rock Band	Won	

== Mediabase Awards ==
Mediabase is a music industry service that monitors radio station airplay in 180 US and Canadian markets. Mediabase publishes music charts and data based on the most played songs on terrestrial and satellite radio, and provides in-depth analytical tools for radio and record industry professionals. Three Days Grace received two awards out of two nominations.

Year	Nominated	Award	Result	Ref.
2006	"Animal I Have Become"	Most-Played Rock Song	Won	
2007	Three Days Grace	#1 Artist All Rock Formats	Won	

== MTV Video Music Awards ==
The MTV Video Music Awards is an award show presented by the cable channel MTV to honour the best in the music video medium. Three Days Grace received one MTV Video Music Awards nomination.

Year	Nominated	Award	Result	Ref.
2022	"So Called Life"	Rock Video of the Year	Nominated	

== Pollstar Awards ==
Pollstar is a trade publication for the concert and live music industry. Three Days Grace received one nomination.

Year	Nominated	Award	Result	Ref.
2008	Three Days Grace	Most Creative Tour Package	Nominated	

== Radio Music Awards ==
The Radio Music Awards was an annual U.S. award show that honoured the year's most successful songs on mainstream radio. Nominations were based on the amount of airplay recording artists receive on radio stations in various formats using chart information compiled by Mediabase. Three Days Grace received two nominations.

Year	Nominated	Award	Result	Ref.
2005	"Home"	Song of the Year: Alternative/Active Rock Radio	Nominated	
2005	"Just Like You"	Song of the Year: Rock Radio	Nominated	

== Socan Awards ==
The Society of Composers, Authors and Music Publishers of Canada (SOCAN) is a Canadian performance rights organization that represents the performing rights of more than 135,000 songwriters, composers and music publishers. Three Days Grace have received two awards out of the two nominations.

Year	Nominated	Award	Result	Ref.
2008	"Animal I Have Become"	SOCAN Salutes	Won	
2012	"Lost in You"	Pop/Rock Music Award	Won	
2018	"The Mountain"	No. 1 Song Award	Won	
2018	"Infra-Red"	No. 1 Song Award	Won	
2019	"The Mountain"	Rock Songwriters of the Year	Won	
2020	"Right Left Wrong"	Rock Music Award	Won	
2026	"Mayday"	No. 1 Song Award	Won	
