= Fallen Angel (Three Days Grace song) =

Single by Three Days Grace

from the album Human
- Released: September 15, 2015
- Studio: Noble Street (Toronto)
- Genre: Alternative metal; post-grunge
- Length: 3:09
- Label: RCA
- Songwriters: Neil Sanderson; Brad Walst; Gavin Brown; Barry Stock; Matt Walst; Christopher Millar; Joey Moi; Ted Bruner
- Producer: Gavin Brown

Three Days Grace singles chronology
"Human Race" (2015)	"Fallen Angel" (2015)	"The Mountain" (2018)

Lyric video
- "Fallen Angel" on YouTube

"Fallen Angel" is a song by Canadian rock band Three Days Grace. The song was released on September 15, 2015, as the fourth and final single from the band's fifth studio album, Human (2015).

== Background ==
Three Days Grace's drummer Neil Sanderson said "Fallen Angel" was about his mother's grief after the deaths of his brother and father when he was five years old. He also revealed that the song was a tough one to write.

== Music video ==
An official lyric video for the single was released November 2, 2015, directed by Matthew JC. The video begins with singer Matt Walst stating, "This song is about losing the people we love and wishing we could have been the ones to save them." Lyrics are overlaid atop the band's live performance at the Bomb Factory in Dallas, TX.

== Legacy ==
In 2016, Sanderson said the band created a page on their official website entitled the "Fallen Angel Dedication Wall" where messages can be posted in memory of loved ones.

== Personnel ==
Three Days Grace

- Matt Walst – lead vocals
- Barry Stock – guitar
- Brad Walst – bass
- Neil Sanderson – drums, backing vocals

Additional musicians

- Dani Rosenoer – keyboards, synth and programming

Production

- Gavin Brown – producer
- Chris Lord-Alge – engineering

== Charts ==
=== Weekly charts ===
Weekly chart performance for "Fallen Angel"
Chart (2015–16)	Peak position
Canada Digital Song Sales (Billboard)	46
Canada Rock (Billboard)	16
US Hot Rock & Alternative Songs (Billboard)	41
US Rock & Alternative Airplay (Billboard)	27

=== Year-end charts ===
Year-end chart performance for "Fallen Angel"
Chart (2016)	Position
US Mainstream Rock Songs (Billboard)	47

== Certifications ==
Certifications for "Fallen Angel"
Region	Certification	Certified units/sales
United States (RIAA)	Gold	500,000^{‡}
^{‡} Sales+streaming figures based on certification alone.

== Release history ==
Release dates and formats for "Fallen Angel"
Region	Date	Format	Label	Ref(s).
United States	September 15, 2015	Mainstream rock	RCA	
