= Human Race (Three Days Grace song) =

Single by Three Days Grace

from the album Human
- Released: March 23, 2015
- Length: 4:09
- Label: RCA
- Songwriter(s): Gavin Brown; Neil Sanderson; Barry Stock; Brad Walst; Matt Walst
- Producer(s): Gavin Brown

Three Days Grace singles chronology
"I Am Machine" (2014)	"Human Race" (2015)	"Fallen Angel" (2015)

Music video
- "Human Race" on YouTube

"Human Race" is a song by Canadian rock band Three Days Grace. The song was released on March 23, 2015, as the third single from the band's fifth studio album Human. An alternative version, known as the "atmosphere version" of the song was released on the deluxe edition of Human.

== Background ==
In an interview with Loudwire, guitarist Barry Stock mentioned that "Human Race" was written while the band was on tour. Stock believed the song's inspiration was from the noise and traffic he saw during a drive through Salt Lake City. Drummer Neil Sanderson stated, "I remember somebody said, 'Where the hell is everybody going and why are they such in a rush? Don't you just get sick of running this race? The human race?' The song was born in that moment. We started writing it right away." A lyric video for the song was released on their YouTube channel on March 23, 2015. The song was nominated for Rock Song of the Year at the Loudwire Music Awards in 2015.

== Composition ==
"Human Race" was written by Johnny Andrews, Neil Sanderson, Matt Walst, Barry Stock and Brad Walst while production was handled by Gavin Brown, who also co-wrote the song. The track is different in sound compared to previous singles "Painkiller" and "I Am Machine", featuring more synth sounds and is described as "a lot more moody." The group's use of electronics on the song drew comparison to Thirty Seconds to Mars.

== Release ==
An atmospheric version of "Human Race" was released on the deluxe edition of Human.

== Music video ==
The music video was released on May 14, 2015, and was directed by Mark Pellington. The video opens up with a message "The problem is not technology. The problem is the personal person using it. We're more than a body and a mind. We are a song," depicting a naked woman lying on her side on a table attached to a breathing tube. Later on in the video, it focuses more about "the ideas of human connection with very distinctive looking actors whose faces seem to tell a story." The video closes with a message remarking "Machines have given us abundance and left us in want. Our knowledge has been as hateful and cynical. Our cleverness is blind and mean and hard and unkind. We know too much and feel too little."

== Charts ==
=== Weekly charts ===
Weekly chart performance for "Human Race"
Chart (2015)	Peak position
Canada Rock (Billboard)	31
US Hot Rock & Alternative Songs (Billboard)	34
US Rock & Alternative Airplay (Billboard)	19

=== Year-end charts ===
Year-end chart performance for "Human Race"
Chart (2015)	Position
US Mainstream Rock Songs (Billboard)	25

== Release history ==
Release dates and formats for "Human Race"
Region	Date	Format	Label	Ref(s).
United States	March 23, 2015	Mainstream rock	RCA	
