= The High Road (Three Days Grace song) =

Single by Three Days Grace

from the album Transit of Venus
- Released: January 22, 2013
- Genre: Alternative rock
- Length: 3:13
- Label: RCA
- Songwriters: Adam Gontier; Chris Tompkins; Matt Walst
- Producer: Don Gilmore

Three Days Grace singles chronology
"Chalk Outline" (2012)	"The High Road" (2013)	"Misery Loves My Company" (2013)

Music video
- "The High Road" on YouTube

"The High Road" is a song by Canadian rock band Three Days Grace, released as the second single from their fourth studio album Transit of Venus on January 22, 2013. The song peaked at number two on the Canada Rock and topped the US Mainstream Rock charts. It was certified Gold by Music Canada in February 2018.

== Composition and lyrics ==
"The High Road" was written by Adam Gontier, Chris Tompkins and Matt Walst, while production was handled by Don Gilmore. Lyrically, the song is about a relationship gone wrong, expressing a more affectionate sentiment from the band. Musically, the song experiments with a synth sound, while maintaining focus on the guitars, drums and bass parts.

== Release ==
A lyric video for the song was released on their YouTube and Vevo channel on January 7, 2013. The song was serviced to rock radio on January 22.

== Chart performance ==
"The High Road" reached number one on the Billboard Mainstream Rock chart. This is the band's first song to not enter the top 20 on the Billboard Alternative Songs peaking at number 24 since "Riot" peaked at number 21 in 2007. It is also the band's tenth number one on the Active Rock Radio chart, breaking the then-record for most number ones on the chart. On the week of December 22, 2012, the song debuted on the Canada Rock chart at number 50, making it the last song from the band to enter the chart before Gontier's departure in January 2013 and until his return to the band in 2024. The song later peaked at number two on the chart.

== Personnel ==
Credits for "The High Road" adapted from the album's liner notes.

Three Days Grace

- Adam Gontier – lead vocals, rhythm guitar
- Neil Sanderson – drums, backing vocals, keyboard, programming
- Brad Walst – bass, backing vocals
- Barry Stock – lead guitar

Production

- Don Gilmore – producer
- Jason Dufour – assistant recording engineer
- Stephen Koszler – assistant recording engineer
- Andrew Schubert – assistant mixing engineer
- Brad Townsend – assistant mixing engineer
- Keith Armstrong – assistant mixing engineer
- Nik Karpen – assistant mixing engineer
- Mark Kiczula – engineer
- Brad Blackwood – mastering
- Chris Lord-Alge – mixing

== Charts ==
=== Weekly charts ===
Weekly chart performance for "The High Road"
Chart (2013)	Peak position
Canada (Canadian Hot 100)	69
Canada Rock (Billboard)	2
US Hot Rock & Alternative Songs (Billboard)	32
US Rock & Alternative Airplay (Billboard)	14

=== Year-end charts ===
Year-end chart performance for "The High Road"
Chart (2013)	Position
US Hot Rock Songs (Billboard)	72
US Rock Airplay (Billboard)	45

== Certification ==
Certifications for "The High Road"
Region	Certification	Certified units/sales
Canada (Music Canada)	Gold	40,000^{‡}
United States (RIAA)	Gold	500,000^{‡}
^{‡} Sales+streaming figures based on certification alone.
