= World So Cold (Three Days Grace song) =

Single by Three Days Grace

from the album Life Starts Now
- Released: August 3, 2010
- Studio: The Warehouse (Vancouver)
- Genre: Post-grunge
- Length: 4:03
- Label: Jive
- Songwriter: Adam Gontier
- Producer: Howard Benson

Three Days Grace singles chronology
"The Good Life" (2010)	"World So Cold" (2010)	"Lost in You" (2011)

Audio video
- "World So Cold" on YouTube

"World So Cold" is the third single released from Three Days Grace's 2009 album, Life Starts Now. The song was released for radio airplay on August 3, 2010. The single debuted on the Billboard Rock Songs chart at number 50 and has reached number one on the Hot Mainstream Rock Tracks chart.

== Composition ==
"World So Cold" was written by Adam Gontier and produced by Howard Benson. The song runs at 140 BPM and is in the key of C minor. It runs for four minutes and three seconds.

Gontier said the song was one of the most personal tracks for him and stated the overall meaning is about "how your world changes so quickly when somebody you love or somebody who's been in your life for so long disappears, and you don't really see it coming. It's about dealing with that."

"World So Cold (piano version)" was released on the Japanese edition of Life Starts Now and on the downloadable single for "Lost in You".

== Critical reception ==
Evigshed.com gave the song a positive review, writing, "The intro starts with an interesting original distortion guitar work, following by the awesome drums section. Then, the vocals come with the first already catchy verse singing by Adam [...] The lyrics are poetic, very sad and moving. Anyway, the most beautiful songs come from heart. Adam is an excellent songwriter who takes you into his soul through his lyrics. He also showcases another facet of his vocal talents very captivating."

== Accolades ==
Accolades for "World So Cold"
Publication	Country	Accolade	Year	Rank
Chart Attack	Canada	Best Song	2010	3

== Personnel ==
Credits for "World So Cold" adapted from album's liner notes.

Three Days Grace

- Adam Gontier – lead vocals, rhythm guitar
- Neil Sanderson – drums, keyboards, backing vocals
- Brad Walst – bass guitar
- Barry Stock – lead guitar

Production

- Howard Benson – producer
- Mike Cashin – assistant engineer
- Chris Lord-Alge – mixing
- Hatsukazu "Hatch" Inagaki – engineer
- Mike Plotnikoff – recording engineer
- Andrew Schubert – additional engineer
- Brad Townsend – additional engineer
- Keith Armstrong – assistant mixing engineer
- Nik Karpen – assistant mixing engineer
- Paul DeCarli – editing engineer

== Charts ==
=== Weekly charts ===
Weekly chart performance for "World So Cold"
Chart (2010–2011)	Peak position
Canada Hot 100 (Billboard)	94
Canada Rock (Billboard)	5
US Bubbling Under Hot 100 (Billboard)	14
US Hot Rock & Alternative Songs (Billboard)	3

=== Year-end charts ===
2010 year-end chart performance for "World So Cold"
Chart (2010)	Position
US Mainstream Rock Songs (Billboard)	40

2011 year-end chart performance for "World So Cold"
Chart (2011)	Position
US Hot Rock & Alternative Songs (Billboard)	24

== Certifications ==
Certifications and sales for "World So Cold"
Region	Certification	Certified units/sales
United States (RIAA)	Platinum	1,000,000^{‡}
^{‡} Sales+streaming figures based on certification alone.

== Release history ==
Release dates and formats for "World So Cold"
Region	Date	Format	Label	Ref(s).
United States	August 3, 2010	Alternative radio	Jive	
United States	August 3, 2010	Mainstream rock	Jive	
