= The Good Life (Three Days Grace song) =

Single by Three Days Grace

from the album Life Starts Now
- Released: February 9, 2010
- Studio: The Warehouse (Vancouver)
- Genre: Hard rock
- Length: 2:53
- Label: Jive
- Songwriter: Adam Gontier
- Producer: Howard Benson

Three Days Grace singles chronology
"Break" (2009)	"The Good Life" (2010)	"World So Cold" (2010)

Music video
- "The Good Life" on YouTube

"The Good Life" is a song by Canadian rock band Three Days Grace. It was released as the second single from their third studio album, Life Starts Now and was serviced to radio airplay on February 9, 2010. Written by Adam Gontier, the song topped the US Hot Rock & Alternative Songs and reached number 52 on the Canadian Hot 100.

== Background and composition ==
"The Good Life" was written by Adam Gontier and was produced by Howard Benson.

Drummer Neil Sanderson explained the sound the group was going for with this song, "sonically, we wanted it to sound like a witch was coming [...] We wanted to keep that song kind of dry and as far as guitar tones, we used a lot of fuzziness and octave pedals and stuff like that — Zeppelin used to use that stuff."

== Critical reception ==
AXS.com listed "The Good Life" as one of the "top 10 best Three Days Grace songs." Patricia Jones of AXS praised the song for its "incredibly bouncy" and "infectious" sound. She stated, "The springy chords and compelling drums make it an easy choice for listening, jamming, and dancing."

== Chart performance ==
The song debuted at number 85 on the Canadian Hot 100 for the week ending October 10, 2009, before becoming a single. The song peaked at number 52 on the Canadian Hot 100. It also reached number one on the Mainstream Rock Tracks and Rock Songs chart and number four on the Alternative Songs chart, matching "Break". It was the second most played song on the Active Rock format in 2010.

== Music video ==
The band shot the video with director Michael Maxxis on March 23, 2010. The video was released on April 27, 2010. The video consists of the band performing in a garage, with Adam Gontier wearing a Citizen Cope outfit, with clips of people performing activities, both recreational and with violent overtones. The video ends with a man kissing his wife and leaving for work. In contrast to the clean and professionally shot look of previous music video for "Break", this video is filmed with a handheld camera in a messy, real world environment and makes heavy use of video editing effects and colour grading to look rough and visually vibrant.

== Accolades ==
Accolades for "The Good Life"
Publication	Country	Accolade	Year	Rank
AOL Radio	United States	"Top Alternative Songs of 2009"	2009	1
Alternative Addiction	United States	"Song of the Year"	2010	39

== Personnel ==
Credits for "The Good Life" adapted from album's liner notes.

Three Days Grace

- Adam Gontier – lead vocals, rhythm guitar
- Neil Sanderson – drums, backing vocals
- Brad Walst – bass guitar, backing vocals
- Barry Stock – lead guitar

Production

- Howard Benson – producer
- Mike Cashin – assistant engineer
- Chris Lord-Alge – mixing
- Ted Jensen – mastering
- Hatsukazu "Hatch" Inagaki – engineer
- Mike Plotnikoff – recording engineer
- Andrew Schubert – additional engineer
- Brad Townsend – additional engineer
- Keith Armstrong – assistant mixing engineer
- Nik Karpen – assistant mixing engineer
- Paul DeCarli – editing engineer

== Charts ==
=== Weekly charts ===
Weekly chart performance for "The Good Life"
Chart (2010)	Peak position
Canada Hot 100 (Billboard)	52
Canada Rock (Billboard)	3
US Bubbling Under Hot 100 (Billboard)	1
US Hot Rock & Alternative Songs (Billboard)	1

=== Year-end charts ===
Year-end chart performance for "The Good Life"
Chart (2010)	Position
US Hot Rock & Alternative Songs (Billboard)	9

== Certifications ==
Certifications and sales for "The Good Life"
Region	Certification	Certified units/sales
United States (RIAA)	Platinum	1,000,000^{‡}
^{‡} Sales+streaming figures based on certification alone.

== Release history ==
Release dates and formats for "The Good Life"
Region	Date	Format	Label	Ref(s).
United States	February 9, 2010	Alternative radio	Jive	
United States	February 9, 2010	Mainstream rock	Jive	

== Use in media ==
- The song was featured on ESPN's Winter X Games XIV.
- "The Good Life" was the featured song for the 2010 ACC men's basketball tournament.
- The song was also used during the 2010 NFL draft.

== See also ==
- List of Billboard Mainstream Rock number-one songs of the 2010s
- List of number-one Billboard Rock Songs
