= Human (Three Days Grace album) =

Studio album by Three Days Grace
- Released: March 31, 2015
- Recorded: 2013–2014
- Studio: Noble Street (Toronto)
- Genre: Post-grunge; alternative metal
- Length: 39:27
- Label: RCA
- Producer: Gavin Brown

Three Days Grace chronology
Transit of Venus (2012)	Human (2015)	Outsider (2018)

Singles from Human
- 1. "Painkiller" Released: April 1, 2014; 2. "I Am Machine" Released: September 30, 2014; 3. "Human Race" Released: March 23, 2015; 4. "Fallen Angel" Released: September 15, 2015

Human is the fifth studio album by the Canadian rock band Three Days Grace. The album was released on March 31, 2015, through RCA Records. This is the group's first of three albums without original lead singer Adam Gontier, and the first with My Darkest Days lead singer and Brad Walst's younger brother Matt Walst.

== Background and recording ==
Following Adam Gontier's exit from the group in January 2013, Matt Walst of My Darkest Days served as his replacement during the band's US tour with Shinedown. The group later confirmed in March 2014, that Walst was now the full-time frontman.

Recording for their fifth studio album began in late 2013, recorded at Noble Street Studios in Toronto with producer Gavin Brown, who produced the band's debut self-titled studio album. According to drummer Neil Sanderson, the album features more raw and aggressive sounds than their previous records. Bassist Brad Walst also added that they went back to their hard rock roots for this album and credited Brown for "getting them in the right mindset." "Painkiller" was the first song they wrote for the album, as well as the first one they wrote with Matt.

The group embarked on the Human Tour in North America from July to November 2015, in support of the album. The band later toured across Europe and Russia from January to February 2016.

== Singles ==
On April 1, 2014, the band released the album's lead single "Painkiller". On April 8, 2014, the song was released to US rock radio stations. The song reached number one on the US Mainstream Rock chart, which made it their eleventh number-one single. The album's second single, "I Am Machine" was released on September 30, 2014. The song topped the US Mainstream Rock chart. On March 23, 2015, "Human Race" was released as the third single. On September 15, 2015, "Fallen Angel" was released as the fourth single.

== Reception ==
Professional ratings
Review scores
Source	Rating
Cryptic Rock	3.5/5 stars
Melodic	3.5/5 stars
Mind Equals Blown	7/10
MusicReviewRadar	3.5/5 stars
New Noise Magazine	3/5 stars
Revolver	3/5 stars
Toronto Sun	2/5
Ultimate Guitar	6.7/10

Human received positive reviews from music critics. Johan Wippsson of Melodic stated, "Matt really delivers here and shows that his voice suits really well for this type of rock and believe that many of the band's fans agree with me. The rest of the album is almost the same class and overall is it very solid, actually a little better than expected." Allison Stewart of Revolver noted that "little has changed" on the album compared to their previous record Transit of Venus outside of their use of synths and said "every track starts slow and ends big, with crunchy, roundhouse-punch choruses sandwiched in between."

Heather Allen at Mind Equals Blown stated "It's always worrisome when a singer gets replaced because the band that you've come to know and love could easily do a complete musical 180. Luckily, Three Days Grace didn't stray too far from their original style and Walst did his absolute best to channel Gontier without being a complete replica of him." MusicReviewRadar wrote a similar review stating, "the departure of the iconic Adam Gontier could have forced the band's loss of identity and direction but Matt Walst managed to fill in Adam's spot without becoming a complete replica" and that "the album was a good surprise [...] well balanced between soft and good-old Three Days Grace-style tracks."

A mixed review was written by Ultimate Guitar who said "it isn't a bad album - it is something worse - it is SO mediocre and 'same' that it is insidious and gets on the radio, gets stuck in your head, but doesn't really do or mean anything or have any kind of real musical value to it." Darryl Sterdan of Toronto Sun gave a negative review of the album remarking that the group "resumed churning out the same morose, morbidly misanthropic modern-rock/post-grunge/alt-metal crud-blort as before." Jeff Miers of The Buffalo News described the album as "a collection stuffed with the sort of generic alt-metal that makes radio programmers squirm with delight and makes the rest of us deeply suspicious."

== Commercial performance ==
The album debuted at number two on the Canadian Albums Chart, selling 6,700 copies in its first week. The album peaked at number 16 on the Billboard 200 and sold 18,000 copies first week. As of January 8, 2016, the album has sold 121,000 copies in the US.

Human earned a nomination for "Rock Album of the Year" at the 2015 Loudwire Music Awards, though ultimately lost to Dark Before Dawn by Breaking Benjamin. The album was certified gold in Canada, Poland, and the United States.

== Awards and nominations ==
Awards and nominations for Human
Year	Organization	Award	Result	Ref(s)
2015	Loudwire Music Awards	Rock Album of the Year	Nominated	

== Track listing ==
All tracks are written by Three Days Grace (Neil Sanderson, Barry Stock, Brad Walst and Matt Walst) and producer Gavin Brown, with additional writers as listed below.

Standard edition
No.	Title	Writer(s)	Length
1.	"Human Race"		4:09
2.	"Painkiller"	Johnny Andrews; Doug Oliver	2:58
3.	"Fallen Angel"	Christopher Millar; Joey Moi; Ted Bruner	3:06
4.	"Landmine"		3:25
5.	"Tell Me Why"		3:30
6.	"I Am Machine"	Andrews	3:21
7.	"So What"	Marti Frederiksen; Mark Holman	2:57
8.	"Car Crash"		2:50
9.	"Nothing's Fair in Love and War"		3:44
10.	"One Too Many"	Casey Marshall	2:41
11.	"The End Is Not the Answer"		2:52
12.	"The Real You"		3:54
Total length:			39:27

Deluxe second disc edition and Japanese bonus tracks
No.	Title	Length
13.	"Every Other Weekend"	4:02
14.	"Human Race" (atmosphere version)	3:59
15.	"Painkiller" (live)	3:20
16.	"Let You Down" (live)	4:10
Total length:		54:58

== Personnel ==
Credits adapted from the album's liner notes.

Three Days Grace

- Matt Walst – lead vocals
- Barry Stock – guitar
- Brad Walst – bass guitar, backing vocals
- Neil Sanderson – drums, keyboards, programming, backing vocals

Additional musicians

- Additional keyboards, synth and programming by Dani Rosenoer
- Additional composers: Ted Bruner (3), Joey Moi (3), Mark Holman (7), Christopher Millar (3), Doug Oliver (2), Johnny Andrews (2, 6), Gavin Brown (1–12), Casey Marshall (10) and Marti Frederiksen (7)

Production

- Produced by Gavin Brown
- Engineered by Lenny DeRose
- Mixed by Nick Raskulinecz (tracks: 1, 4, 5, 7, 8, 9, 10, 11, 12), Chris Lord-Alge (tracks: 2, 3, 6), Keith Armstrong and Nik Karpen
- Mastered by Joe LaPorta
- Studio assistants: Alex Krotz, Nathan Yarbourgh, Dim-E Krnjaic, Kevin O'Leary and Trevor Anderson
- Editing and Pro Tools by Dave Mohacsi and Alastair Sims
- A&R by David Wolter

Artwork

- Creative director: Erwin Gorostiza
- Art direction by Chris Feldmann and Three Days Grace
- Design by Chris Feldmann
- Photo by Michael Muller
- Illustrations by Matthew Curry

== Charts ==
=== Weekly charts ===
Weekly chart performance for Human
Chart (2015)	Peak position
Australian Albums (ARIA)	63
Canadian Albums (Billboard)	2
German Albums (Offizielle Top 100)	77
New Zealand Albums (RMNZ)	34
Scottish Albums (OCC)	97
UK Albums (OCC)	104
UK Rock & Metal Albums (OCC)	8
US Billboard 200	16
US Top Album Sales (Billboard)	10
US Top Rock Albums (Billboard)	3
US Top Alternative Albums (Billboard)	3
US Top Hard Rock Albums (Billboard)	1

=== Year-end charts ===
Year-end chart performance for Human
Chart (2015)	Position
US Top Alternative Albums (Billboard)	32
US Top Hard Rock Albums (Billboard)	14
US Top Rock Albums (Billboard)	40

== Certifications ==
Certifications and sales for Human
Region	Certification	Certified units/sales
Canada (Music Canada)	Gold	40,000^{‡}
Poland (ZPAV)	Gold	10,000^{‡}
United States (RIAA)	Gold	500,000^{‡}
^{‡} Sales+streaming figures based on certification alone.

== Release history ==
Release history and formats for Human
Region	Date	Edition	Format	Label	Ref.
Various	March 31, 2015	Standard; deluxe	CD; digital download; LP	RCA	
Japan	June 24, 2015	Japanese bonus tracks	CD	Sony Music Japan	
