= Chalk Outline (song) =

Single by Three Days Grace

from the album Transit of Venus
- Released: August 14, 2012
- Studio: Revolution Studios (Toronto)
- Genre: Alternative metal; post-grunge
- Length: 3:02
- Label: RCA
- Songwriters: Adam Gontier; Barry Stock; Craig Wiseman
- Producer: Don Gilmore

Three Days Grace singles chronology
"Lost in You" (2011)	"Chalk Outline" (2012)	"The High Road" (2013)

Music video
- "Chalk Outline" on YouTube

"Chalk Outline" is the lead single from Canadian rock band Three Days Grace's fourth album, Transit of Venus. The band released many "snippets" of the song before August 14 to tease fans. It reached No. 1 on the U.S. Active Rock chart for a total of 10 weeks and won the "Rock Song of the Year" award given by Loudwire. Billboard ranked the song at number 8 on their "Greatest of All Time Mainstream Rock Songs" list.

== Background ==
"Chalk Outline" is about being alienated and left behind. Drummer Neil Sanderson stated, "It's about being pushed aside by people close to you. A lot of people can relate. But it's not just about relationships. It's also about society. Society moves quickly, and not everyone is fortunate enough to be active members of society."

== Composition ==
"Chalk Outline" was written by Adam Gontier, Barry Stock and Craig Wiseman while production was handled by Don Gilmore. The song was recorded at Revolution Studios in Toronto, Canada. Bassist Brad Walst spoke with Billboard about recording the track stating, "I remember sitting in the control room with [producer] Don Gilmore for hours and hours and hours, trying to figure out how to get that punchy, heavy sound out of something other than a guitar."

== Critical reception ==
Professional ratings
Review scores
Source	Rating
Evigshed	5/5 stars
Loudwire	4/5 stars

The song was mostly met with positive reviews. Chad Childers of Loudwire gave the song a 4/5 rating, saying that "Adam Gontier attacks the track with as much angst and aggression as ever." Billboard calls the song, "a welcome change of pace that certainly piques interest in what else Three Days Grace gets up to on the rest of the album." Sylvie Lesas of Evigshed gave the single 5/5, praising the fact the band took a different direction musically.

== Music video ==
"Chalk Outline" has a lyric video, which shows the lyrics of the song over a clip of a man walking around a city. The band also released an official music video for "Chalk Outline" on October 5. The video shows Adam Gontier walking through a city, singing and gesturing to the camera while passing the other band members on the way, culminating with the four of them meeting in a dark room, performing the song. The video was directed by Shane Drake and was filmed in Brooklyn, New York. It was the band's last music video to feature lead singer Adam Gontier, who departed the band on January 9, 2013, before returning to the group in October 2024.

== Charts ==
=== Weekly charts ===
Weekly chart performance for "Chalk Outline"
Chart (2012)	Peak position
Canada Hot 100 (Billboard)	65
Canada Rock (Billboard)	2
US Bubbling Under Hot 100 (Billboard)	6
US Hot Rock & Alternative Songs (Billboard)	7
US Rock & Alternative Airplay (Billboard)	5

=== Year-end charts ===
2012 year-end charts for "Chalk Outline"
Chart (2012)	Position
US Hot Rock Songs (Billboard)	30

2013 year-end chart performance for "Chalk Outline"
Chart (2013)	Position
US Hot Rock Songs (Billboard)	67
US Rock Airplay (Billboard)	24

=== All-time charts ===
All-time chart performance for "Chalk Outline"
Chart (All-time)	Position
US Mainstream Rock Songs (Billboard)	8

== Certifications ==
Certifications for "Chalk Outline"
Region	Certification	Certified units/sales
Canada (Music Canada)	Gold	40,000^{‡}
United States (RIAA)	Platinum	1,000,000^{‡}
^{‡} Sales+streaming figures based on certification alone.
