= Painkiller (Three Days Grace song) =

Single by Three Days Grace

from the album Human
- Released: April 1, 2014
- Recorded: 2013
- Studio: Noble Street (Toronto)
- Genre: Alternative metal; hard rock
- Length: 2:58
- Label: RCA
- Songwriters: Johnny Andrews; Gavin Brown; Douglas Ryan Oliver; Neil Sanderson; Barry Stock; Brad Walst; Matt Walst
- Producer: Gavin Brown

Three Days Grace singles chronology
"Misery Loves My Company" (2013)	"Painkiller" (2014)	"I Am Machine" (2014)

Lyric video
- "Painkiller" on YouTube

"Painkiller" is a song by Canadian rock band Three Days Grace. The song was released on April 1, 2014, as the lead single from their fifth studio album, Human (2015). It is the first single released with new singer Matt Walst, following the departure of Adam Gontier. The song reached number one on Billboard's Mainstream Rock chart, which made it their eleventh number-one single.

== Background ==
On March 28, 2014, the band officially announced that Matt Walst would be Adam Gontier's permanent replacement in the band. Within the announcement, it was teased that new music would be heard the following week and on March 31, the band premiered "Painkiller" on their YouTube channel. The song was officially released through iTunes on April 1. Drummer Neil Sanderson talked about the meaning behind the song in a making of video released on the band's YouTube account:

"Painkiller, that song is about how everybody is addicted to something. It's written from the perspective of the vice that you need to be addicted to. The love of the drug, it's the villain who taunts you into wanting more."

== Composition ==
"Painkiller" was written by Johnny Andrews, Douglas Ryan Oliver, Neil Sanderson, Barry Stock, Brad Walst and Matt Walst while production was handled by Gavin Brown who also co-wrote the track. The song was recorded in Noble Street Studios, Toronto, Ontario, in late 2013. It was the first track they wrote with Matt, who had already written most of the chorus. Stock stated that they wrote the song from the perspective of how everyone has a vice and it drawing you back in.

== Awards and nominations ==
Awards and nominations for "Painkiller"
Year	Organization	Award	Result	Ref(s)
2014	Loudwire Music Awards	Rock Song of the Year	Won	

== Charts ==
=== Weekly charts ===
Weekly chart performance for "Painkiller"
Chart (2014)	Peak position
Canada Hot 100 (Billboard)	86
Canada Rock (Billboard)	6
US Hot Rock & Alternative Songs (Billboard)	24
US Rock & Alternative Airplay (Billboard)	14

=== Year-end charts ===
Year-end chart performance for "Painkiller"
Chart (2014)	Position
US Hot Rock & Alternative Songs (Billboard)	64
US Rock Airplay (Billboard)	37

== Certifications ==
Certifications for "Painkiller"
Region	Certification	Certified units/sales
Canada (Music Canada)	Gold	40,000^{‡}
United States (RIAA)	Platinum	1,000,000^{‡}
^{‡} Sales+streaming figures based on certification alone.

== Release history ==
Release dates and formats for "Painkiller"
Region	Date	Format	Label	Ref(s).
Various	April 1, 2014	Digital download	RCA	
United States	April 8, 2014	Mainstream rock	RCA	
