= Break (Three Days Grace song) =

Single by Three Days Grace

from the album Life Starts Now
- Released: September 1, 2009
- Recorded: 2009
- Genre: Alternative metal; hard rock; post-grunge
- Length: 3:13
- Label: Jive
- Songwriters: Adam Gontier; Barry Stock
- Producer: Howard Benson

Three Days Grace singles chronology
"Riot" (2007)	"Break" (2009)	"The Good Life" (2010)

Music video
- "Break" on YouTube

"Break" is a song by Canadian rock band Three Days Grace. It was released as the lead single on September 1, 2009, from their third studio album, Life Starts Now, which followed three weeks later. The song peaked at number 26 on the Canadian Hot 100 and number 73 on the Billboard Hot 100. The song was certified 2× Platinum by the Recording Industry Association of America in November 2025.

== Background ==
The band released a teaser of the single on their website on August 27, 2009, before the song was sent for radio airplay the following week. According to bass guitarist Brad Walst, "Break" is about "breaking away from bad influences," during an interview by the Peterborough Examiner. Singer Adam Gontier told Jam! that the band wanted to be "more hopeful." Additionally, in an interview with TheDeadbolt.com, lead guitarist Barry Stock explained the meaning behind "Break":

"It's really just about if you don't like the situation you're in or what's going on around you, it's entirely up to you to break out of it. That's it. It's pretty much just breaking out and letting loose. You don't have to be stuck in whatever it is you're dealing with. Whether it's good or bad, it's your choice to make a change."

According to the sheet music published at Musicnotes.com, by Alfred Music Publishing, the track runs at 116 BPM and is in the key of D Minor. Gontier's range in the song spans from the notes D4 to B♭5.

== Chart performance ==
"Break" peaked at number 26 on the Canadian Hot 100. The song also peaked at number 73 on the Billboard Hot 100. The song topped the US Hot Rock & Alternative Songs chart for twelve weeks. The song also peaked at number one on the US Mainstream Rock chart for eleven weeks. The song reached number four on the Alternative Airplay chart. As of February 21, 2010, the single has sold 359,461 units.

== Awards and nominations ==
In 2010, the song earned two nominations at the MuchMusic Video Awards for Post Production of the Year and Rock Video of the Year. The song also earned a CASBY Awards nomination for Best Single of the Year. The song was nominated for Recording Engineer of the Year at the 2011 Juno Awards. Billboard ranked the song at number seven on their "Greatest of All Time Mainstream Rock Songs" list. It was the number one most played song on the Active Rock format in 2010.

=== Accolades ===
Accolades for "Break"
Publication	Country	Accolade	Year	Rank	Ref.
AOL Radio	United States	"Top Alternative Songs of 2009"	2009	4	
AOL Radio	United States	"Top Rock Songs of 2009"	2009	3	
New York Post	United States	"Top 209 Songs From 2009"	2009	136	

== Music video ==
On September 11, Three Days Grace announced the music video for "Break" would debut on Yahoo! Music on September 14, 2009. The music video, directed by P. R. Brown, begins with the band members entering separate rooms that match their clothes' colors (Adam wearing white, Neil wearing black, Brad wearing gray, and Barry wearing pink), and shows four balls, matching the aforementioned colors, in a pendulum-like state. The beginning of the track "Someone Who Cares" serves as both the intro and the outro for the music video version of the song. The band begins to perform their parts in these separate rooms as giant fans appear and begin to operate. As the song progresses, floating paint balls are pulled through the fans and thus travel in a circle that leaves them stained with the color of the band mate to their left (Adam with pink, Neil with white, Brad with black, and Barry with gray). The song ends with them exiting down a hall, the four paint balls following them.

Several of the effects used in the video include: phantom cams, green screens, polymer, and water-based paint. Speaking about the music video, Brad Walst explained the concept of the video.

"We were working with P.R. Brown who's a really cool director, he does a lot of computer graphics and stuff like that so for this one we kind of wanted to get away from the whole rock video concept and the extras and all that shit so we just kind of sat with him and he brought up this really cool idea of doing just individual performances in these different rooms. We actually shot it all in front of a green screen which we’ve never done so that was a pretty cool experience."

== Personnel ==
Credits for "Break" adapted from album's liner notes.

Three Days Grace

- Adam Gontier – lead vocals, rhythm guitar
- Neil Sanderson – drums, backing vocals
- Brad Walst – bass guitar
- Barry Stock – lead guitar

Production

- Howard Benson – producer
- Mike Cashin – assistant engineer
- Chris Lord-Alge – mixing
- Ted Jensen – mastering
- Hatsukazu "Hatch" Inagaki – engineer
- Mike Plotnikoff – recording engineer
- Andrew Schubert – additional engineer
- Brad Townsend – additional engineer
- Keith Armstrong – assistant mixing engineer
- Nik Karpen – assistant mixing engineer

== Charts ==
=== Weekly charts ===
Weekly chart performance for "Break"
Chart (2009–10)	Peak position
Canada Hot 100 (Billboard)	26
Canada Rock (Billboard)	2
Czech Republic Rock (IFPI)	17
US Billboard Hot 100	73
US Hot Rock & Alternative Songs (Billboard)	1

=== Year-end charts ===
2009 year-end chart performance for "Break"
Chart (2009)	Position
US Hot Rock & Alternative Songs (Billboard)	39

2010 year-end chart performance for "Break"
Chart (2010)	Position
US Hot Rock & Alternative Songs (Billboard)	4

=== All-time charts ===
All-time chart performance for "Break"
Chart (All-time)	Position
US Mainstream Rock Songs (Billboard)	7

== Certifications ==
Certifications and sales for "Break"
Region	Certification	Certified units/sales
United States (RIAA)	2× Platinum	2,000,000^{‡}
^{‡} Sales+streaming figures based on certification alone.

== Release history ==
Release history for "Break"
Region	Date	Format	Label	Ref(s).
Canada	September 1, 2009	Contemporary hit radio	Jive	
Various	September 1, 2009	Digital download	Jive	
United States	September 8, 2009	Alternative radio	Jive	
United States	September 8, 2009	Mainstream rock	Jive	
