= Transit of Venus (album) =

Studio album by Three Days Grace
- Released: October 2, 2012
- Recorded: January 5 – July 31, 2012
- Studio: Revolution Studios (Toronto)
- Genre: Post-grunge; hard rock
- Length: 41:40
- Label: RCA
- Producer: Don Gilmore

Three Days Grace chronology
Life Starts Now (2009)	Transit of Venus (2012)	Human (2015)

Singles from Transit of Venus
- 1. "Chalk Outline" Released: August 14, 2012; 2. "The High Road" Released: January 22, 2013; 3. "Misery Loves My Company" Released: May 14, 2013

Transit of Venus is the fourth studio album by the Canadian rock band Three Days Grace. It was released on October 2, 2012 through RCA Records. The album is the band's first to be released under the record label, following the folding of their former label, Jive Records, in 2011. The album was produced by Don Gilmore and recorded at Revolution Studios in Toronto.

On June 5, 2012, the same day as Venus's visible transit across the sun, the band announced the album title and release date. The album spawned three singles ("Chalk Outline", "The High Road" and "Misery Loves My Company"). It is the last album to feature lead singer Adam Gontier before he left the band in 2013 and returned to the group in October 2024.

The album debuted at No. 5 on the Billboard 200. It was nominated for Best Rock Album at the Juno Awards of 2014.

== Background and recording ==
On June 5, 2012, the same day as the transit of Venus, the band announced the album title, as well as a release date set for October 2. According to guitarist Barry Stock, their fans thought of the title who started speculating what the new album would be called on website forums a year prior.

"We went for a tighter, more articulated sound on this record", said Neil Sanderson, the drummer of the band. "The music we were writing was a little more intricate than in the past, and we've been experimenting with new instruments. We wanted to present these new ideas concisely without going over-the-top in ambience and overall production." The album was recorded at Revolution Studios in Toronto and produced by Don Gilmore. The band took a different approach on this album heading into the studio, spending three and a half months working and writing songs, where in the past, the songs were already written and only had to spend a month in the studio recording. The group also decided to cut back on layering guitar parts and experimented with different ideas, taking a "more industrial turn." Guitarist Barry Stock wanted to go with a simpler sound, combining the rig he uses in studio and on the road. He used a Tiny Terror and Diesel VH4 amp. The album was influenced by Nine Inch Nails. Adam Gontier described the material as angsty and dark. Gontier also stated that "Give Me a Reason" was the most personal song off the record, dealing with his family life and the issues he had over the last couple of years. The album was made available to stream online on September 27, 2012. A Best Buy exclusive of the album was released on October 12, which contained the CD and a T-shirt bundle. In promotion of the album, they played some concert shows in the US in October 2012, as well as performing at the Rock Allegiance Festival. The band co-headlined a US arena tour with Shinedown that began in early 2013. The group extended the tour throughout April and May.

"Chalk Outline" is the first single of the album and was released on August 14, 2012. Loudwire gave the song a 4/5 rating, saying that "Adam Gontier attacks the track with as much angst and aggression as ever." Eviqshed.com gave the single 5/5, praising the fact the band took a different direction musically. The lyric video to the song was published on YouTube on Three Days Grace's Vevo account on August 13 and the official music video was published on October 5. "The High Road" was released as the album's second single on January 22, 2013. "Misery Loves My Company" was released on May 14, 2013, as the third and final single.

== Reception ==
=== Critical reception ===
Professional ratings
Review scores
Source	Rating
AllMusic	3.5/5 stars
Artistdirect	5/5 stars
Inspirer Magazine	(8/10)
Loudwire	4/5 stars
Melodic	3.5/5 stars
The Lantern	A−

Upon its release, the album was met with generally favorable reviews by mainstream music critics, citing the band's different musical direction. Loudwire gave the album a 4 out of 5, saying that "Three Days Grace has stepped out of their comfort zone, ditched the formula, and went all in, holding nothing back in the true spirit of rock." Another positive review came from Artistdirect's Rick Florino, who said that "Three Days Grace have undeniably progressed here, and the results are nothing short of incredible." Johan Wippsson of Melodic wrote that in Transit of Venus "there's an aggressive undertone, which sets a perfect alternative touch on the album." Dan Hope of The Lantern stated, "Some Three Days Grace fans might be initially rebuffed by the increased impact of studio production on this album, but overall, it is another fantastic chapter to the band's discography."

Gregory Heaney at AllMusic describes the album as "more refined than anything they've done before". Heaner adds that the "level of atmosphere" on the album allows Three Days Grace to stand out among other post-grunge bands. An article by music journalist Clayton Petras in Inspirer Magazine gave the album a positive review, mentioning that although the album "opens with some eerie notes and a crooning Adam Gontier that we're not quite used to", it goes on to mention that the album settles into "the gruff, rugged sound we've come to expect from the band".

=== Chart performance ===
The album peaked at number 4 on the Canadian Albums Chart. It also debuted at No. 5 on the Billboard 200, selling 48,000 copies in the U.S. in its first week, two positions behind the band's previous album Life Starts Now, but the same position as One-X. Transit of Venus reached number No. 1 on U.S. Billboard Top Hard Rock Albums, No. 3 on both the U.S. Billboard Top Rock Albums and U.S. Billboard Top Alternative Albums, and at No. 4 on the U.S. Billboard Top Digital Albums. On Loudwire, the song "Chalk Outline" won the website's Rock Song of the Year award for 2012. The song topped the U.S. Billboard Mainstream Rock Tracks charts debuting at No. 1 and remaining in this position for 13 consecutive weeks, before dropping to No. 3 on its seventeenth week on the chart. The song also reached No. 1 on the Active Rock Radio chart, and remained in this position for eleven weeks. This makes "Chalk Outline" the ninth Three Days Grace song to top Active Rock Radio. "Chalk Outline" also peaked at No. 6 on the U.S. Billboard Bubbling Under Hot 100 Singles, No. 7 on the U.S. Billboard Rock Songs, No. 15 on the U.S. Billboard Alternative Songs Chart, and No. 65 on the Canadian Hot 100. "The High Road" debuted at number 50 on the Canada Rock chart on the week of December 22, 2012, making it the last song from the band with Gontier to enter the charts before his departure in January 2013. Both "The High Road" and "Misery Loves My Company" topped the U.S. Mainstream Rock chart. The album has sold 258,000 copies in the U.S. as of March 2015. In February 2018, Transit of Venus was certified gold in Canada.

== Awards and nominations ==
Awards and nominations for Transit of Venus
Year	Organization	Award	Result	Ref(s)
2014	Juno Awards	Rock Album of the Year	Nominated	

== Track listing ==
All lyrics are written by Three Days Grace, except where noted.

No.	Title	Writer(s)	Length
1.	"Sign of the Times"	Three Days Grace, Jaren Johnson	3:11
2.	"Chalk Outline"	Three Days Grace, Craig Wiseman	3:02
3.	"The High Road"	Three Days Grace, Chris Tompkins, Matt Walst	3:13
4.	"Operate"	Three Days Grace, Walst	3:22
5.	"Anonymous"		3:13
6.	"Misery Loves My Company"	Three Days Grace, Wiseman	2:42
7.	"Give In to Me" (Michael Jackson cover)	Michael Jackson, Bill Bottrell	3:19
8.	"Happiness"		2:53
9.	"Give Me a Reason"		4:03
10.	"Time That Remains"	Three Days Grace, Chris Wallin	3:12
11.	"Expectations"	Three Days Grace, Wallin	2:43
12.	"Broken Glass"		3:21
13.	"Unbreakable Heart"	Three Days Grace, Rob Hawkins, Tompkins	3:26
Total length:			41:40

== Personnel ==
Personnel adapted from Transit of Venus liner notes.

Three Days Grace

- Adam Gontier – lead vocals, rhythm guitar
- Barry Stock – lead guitar
- Brad Walst – bass guitar, backing vocals
- Neil Sanderson – drums, backing vocals, keyboards, programming

Production

- Don Gilmore – producer
- David Wolter – A&R
- Mark Kiczula – engineer
- Keith Armstrong – assistant mixing engineer
- Jason Dufour – assistant engineer
- Nik Karpen – assistant mixing engineer
- Stephen Koszler – assistant engineer
- Andrew Schubert – additional assistant mixing engineer
- Brad Townsend – additional assistant mixing engineer
- Brad Blackwood – mastering
- Chris Lord-Alge – mixing

Artwork

- Joseph Episcopo – stylist
- Chris Feldman – art direction
- Three Days Grace – art direction
- Michael Muller – photography
- Walter Nomura – illustrations

== Charts ==
=== Weekly charts ===
Weekly chart performance for Transit of Venus
Chart (2012)	Peak position
Canadian Albums (Billboard)	4
US Billboard 200	5
US Top Alternative Albums (Billboard)	3
US Top Hard Rock Albums (Billboard)	1
US Top Rock Albums (Billboard)	3

=== Year-end charts ===
Year-end chart performance for Transit of Venus
Chart (2012)	Position
US Top Alternative Albums (Billboard)	38
US Top Hard Rock Albums (Billboard)	20
US Top Rock Albums (Billboard)	68
Chart (2013)	Position
US Top Hard Rock Albums (Billboard)	21

== Certifications ==
Certifications and sales for Transit of Venus
Region	Certification	Certified units/sales
Canada (Music Canada)	Gold	40,000^{‡}
United States (RIAA)	Gold	500,000^{‡}
^{‡} Sales+streaming figures based on certification alone.

== Release history ==
Release history and formats for Transit of Venus
Region	Date	Edition	Format	Label	Ref.
Various	October 2, 2012	Standard	CD; digital download	RCA	
United States	October 12, 2012	Best Buy exclusive	CD	RCA	
Various	March 20, 2026	Standard	vinyl	RCA	
