= Misery Loves My Company =

Single by Three Days Grace

from the album Transit of Venus
- Released: May 14, 2013
- Genre: Alternative metal
- Length: 2:42
- Label: RCA
- Songwriters: Adam Gontier; Craig Wiseman
- Producer: Don Gilmore

Three Days Grace singles chronology
"The High Road" (2013)	"Misery Loves My Company" (2013)	"Painkiller" (2014)

Music video
- "Misery Loves My Company" on YouTube

"Misery Loves My Company" is a song by Canadian rock band Three Days Grace, from their fourth studio album Transit of Venus released on May 14, 2013. The song reached number 38 on the Canada Rock chart. It also topped the Billboard Mainstream Rock chart. It is the last single to feature Adam Gontier on lead vocals until his return to the band in 2024.

== Composition ==
"Misery Loves My Company" was written by Adam Gontier and Craig Wiseman, while production was handled by Don Gilmore. Drummer Neil Sanderson described the song as "tongue in cheek," explaining: "We've always kind of just written about real experiences in our lives. I think that's one of the biggest things with just our connection to fans is that fans realize that it comes from a real place and we're kind of just regular guys that write about real things that everybody goes through and I think that there's a real tangible connection there."

== Critical reception ==
AXS.com listed "Misery Loves My Company" as one of the "Top 10 best Three Days Grace songs." Patricia Jones of AXS praised singer Adam Gontier's "distinct vocals" and Barry Stock's "crisp guitar solo" on the song.

== Chart performance ==
The track became the band's tenth song to reach number-one on the Billboard Mainstream Rock chart in its November 2, 2013, issue. It is the band's eleventh No. 1 single in total.

== Music video ==
The band held a contest for fans to make a music video for the song in which the winner would receive $5,000. The winner's video would also premiere on the band's Vevo page. The official music video was released on September 11, 2013, directed by Esther Quenneville and Xavier Collet-Garand. The group also released the runner-up videos, via the Genero website. It was also nominated for a Genero Award for Video of the Year in 2013.

== Personnel ==
Credits for "Misery Loves My Company" adapted from the album's liner notes.

Three Days Grace

- Adam Gontier – lead vocals, rhythm guitar
- Neil Sanderson – drums, backing vocals, keyboard, programming
- Brad Walst – bass, backing vocals
- Barry Stock – lead guitar

Production

- Don Gilmore – producer
- Jason Dufour – assistant recording engineer
- Stephen Koszler – assistant recording engineer
- Andrew Schubert – assistant mixing engineer
- Brad Townsend – assistant mixing engineer
- Keith Armstrong – assistant mixing engineer
- Nik Karpen – assistant mixing engineer
- Mark Kiczula – engineer
- Brad Blackwood – mastering
- Chris Lord-Alge – mixing

== Charts ==
=== Weekly charts ===
Weekly chart performance for "Misery Loves My Company"
Chart (2013)	Peak position
Canada Rock (Billboard)	38
US Holiday Airplay (Billboard)	30
US Hot Rock & Alternative Songs (Billboard)	49
US Rock & Alternative Airplay (Billboard)	13

=== Year-end charts ===
Year-end chart performance for "Misery Loves My Company"
Chart (2013)	Position
US Mainstream Rock Songs (Billboard)	11

== Release history ==
Release history and formats for "Misery Loves My Company"
Region	Date	Format	Label	Ref.
United States	May 14, 2013	Mainstream rock	RCA	
Canada	September 11, 2013	Digital download	RCA	
