= I Am Machine =

Single by Three Days Grace

from the album Human
- Released: September 30, 2014
- Recorded: 2013–2014
- Genre: Alternative metal
- Length: 3:20
- Label: RCA
- Songwriters: Gavin Brown; Johnny Andrews; Neil Sanderson; Matt Walst; Barry Stock; Brad Walst
- Producer: Gavin Brown

Three Days Grace singles chronology
"Painkiller" (2014)	"I Am Machine" (2014)	"Human Race" (2015)

Lyric video
- "I Am Machine" on YouTube

"I Am Machine" is a song by Canadian rock band Three Days Grace. The song was released as a single on September 30, 2014. It is the second single from the band's fifth studio album Human. The song became the group's thirteenth number-one on the Active Rock charts, as well as their twelfth on the US Mainstream Rock chart.

== Background ==
Guitarist Barry Stock told Guitar World that the song is about, "a feeling we all have from time to time." He further elaborated stating, "Everyone is stuck in technology these days with our heads stuck down on our phones. We're all guilty of that to some degree. The song is really about the idea that sometimes you just have to lift your head up and look around and see how beautiful things are."

== Composition ==
"I Am Machine" was written by Johnny Andrews, Neil Sanderson, Matt Walst, Barry Stock and Brad Walst while production was handled by Gavin Brown who also co-wrote the song. Sanderson described the track as "one of the heaviest things" they've played.

== Lyric video ==
A lyric video for the song was released on their YouTube and Vevo channel on September 28, 2014. The video includes the band recording the song, while lyrics are shown over the video.

== Accolades ==
The song was nominated for Rock Song of the Year at the 2016 iHeartRadio Music Awards. Billboard ranked the song at number 91 on their "Greatest of All Time Mainstream Rock Songs" list.

== Charts ==
=== Weekly charts ===
Weekly chart performance for "I Am Machine"
Chart (2014–2015)	Peak position
Canada Digital Song Sales (Billboard)	72
Canada Rock (Billboard)	18
US Hot Rock & Alternative Songs (Billboard)	20
US Rock & Alternative Airplay (Billboard)	12

=== Year-end charts ===
Year-end chart performance for "I Am Machine"
Chart (2015)	Position
US Hot Rock Songs (Billboard)	77
US Rock Airplay (Billboard)	46

=== All-time charts ===
All-time chart performance for "I Am Machine"
Chart (All-time)	Position
US Mainstream Rock Songs (Billboard)	91

== Certifications ==
Certifications and sales for "I Am Machine"
Region	Certification	Certified units/sales
Canada (Music Canada)	Gold	40,000^{‡}
United States (RIAA)	2× Platinum	2,000,000^{‡}
^{‡} Sales+streaming figures based on certification alone.

== Release history ==
Release dates and formats for "I Am Machine"
Region	Date	Format	Label	Ref(s).
Various	September 30, 2014	Digital download	RCA	
United States	October 7, 2014	Mainstream rock	RCA	
