= Lost in You (Three Days Grace song) =

Single by Three Days Grace

from the album Life Starts Now
- Released: February 1, 2011
- Recorded: 2009
- Genre: Alternative rock; post-grunge
- Length: 3:53
- Label: Jive
- Songwriter: Adam Gontier
- Producer: Howard Benson

Three Days Grace singles chronology
"World So Cold" (2010)	"Lost in You" (2011)	"Chalk Outline" (2012)

Audio video
- "Lost in You" on YouTube

"Lost in You" is a song by Canadian rock band Three Days Grace. Written by the band's lead singer Adam Gontier, the song was released for radio airplay on February 1, 2011, as the fourth and final single from the band's third studio album Life Starts Now (2009). Much like "Never Too Late", it was a crossover song to top 40 radio. The song is also the band's first entry into adult contemporary stations; the first stations being on CFIT-FM Calgary, CKSY-FM Chatham-Kent, CJRL-FM Kenora and WNIC Detroit.

== Background ==
"Lost in You" is considered somewhat unusual for the band. The song expresses a more affectionate sentiment than is typically found in the band's music. While electric guitars still play a prominent role, the focus is on Adam Gontier's voice and the melody.

The lyrics are bittersweet as Gontier sings about a love that has its ups and downs. The song's verse runs at a time signature of 6/4, according to drummer Neil Sanderson.

On March 15, 2011, the band released an EP, via online download, containing the piano version of "World So Cold" and a cover of the Fleetwood Mac song "The Chain" in promotion of "Lost in You".

The song won a BDS Certified Spin Award based on the 50,000 spins it received in 2011. The song also won the "Pop/Rock Music Award" at the 2012 SOCAN Awards.

== Accolades ==
Accolades for "Lost in You"
Publication	Country	Accolade	Year	Rank
Alternative Addiction	United States	"Song of the Year"	2011	27

== Track listing ==
CD single
No.	Title	Length
1.	"Lost in You"	3:53

Digital EP
No.	Title	Length
1.	"Lost in You"	3:53
2.	"World So Cold" (piano version)	4:19
3.	"The Chain" (Fleetwood Mac cover)	3:50

== Personnel ==
Credits for "Lost in You" adapted from album's liner notes.

Three Days Grace

- Adam Gontier – lead vocals, rhythm guitar
- Neil Sanderson – drums, backing vocals
- Brad Walst – bass guitar
- Barry Stock – lead guitar

Production

- Howard Benson – producer
- Mike Cashin – assistant engineer
- Chris Lord-Alge – mixing
- Hatsukazu "Hatch" Inagaki – engineer
- Mike Plotnikoff – recording engineer
- Andrew Schubert – additional engineer
- Brad Townsend – additional engineer
- Keith Armstrong – assistant mixing engineer
- Nik Karpen – assistant mixing engineer

== Charts ==
=== Weekly charts ===
Weekly chart performance for "Lost in You"
Chart (2011)	Peak position
Canada Hot 100 (Billboard)	37
Canada CHR/Top 40 (Billboard)	36
Canada Hot AC (Billboard)	15
Canada Rock (Billboard)	4
US Bubbling Under Hot 100 (Billboard)	17
US Adult Pop Airplay (Billboard)	23
US Hot Rock & Alternative Songs (Billboard)	17

=== Year-end charts ===
Year-end chart performance for "Lost in You"
Chart (2011)	Position
US Hot Rock & Alternative Songs (Billboard)	46

== Certifications ==
Certifications for "Lost in You"
Region	Certification	Certified units/sales
United States (RIAA)	Gold	500,000^{‡}
^{‡} Sales+streaming figures based on certification alone.

== Release history ==
Release dates and formats for "Lost in You"
Region	Date	Format	Label	Ref(s).
United States	February 1, 2011	Alternative radio	Jive	
United States	February 1, 2011	Mainstream rock	Jive	
Various	March 15, 2011	Digital download	Jive	
