= Life Starts Now =

Studio album by Three Days Grace
- Released: September 22, 2009
- Recorded: March – August 2009
- Studio: The Warehouse (Vancouver)
- Genres: Post-grunge; alternative metal; hard rock
- Length: 43:34
- Label: Jive
- Producer: Howard Benson

Three Days Grace chronology
One-X (2006)	Life Starts Now (2009)	Transit of Venus (2012)

Singles from Life Starts Now
- 1. "Break" Released: September 1, 2009; 2. "The Good Life" Released: February 9, 2010; 3. "World So Cold" Released: August 3, 2010; 4. "Lost in You" Released: February 1, 2011

Life Starts Now is the third studio album by the Canadian rock band Three Days Grace. The album was released on September 22, 2009. It was produced by Howard Benson. It was the second time in a row that the band has worked with him, after the commercially successful One-X. Life Starts Now expresses a lighter lyrical mood compared to the previous album. It is the first Three Days Grace album to be released by Sony Music Entertainment and the last to be released by Jive Records, as Sony disbanded the label in 2011.

== Background and production ==
After being on the road for five years with Three Days Grace, the bass guitarist, Brad Walst, said, "We all came home and got a hard dose of life," which the band then used to create a more "musically in-depth and personal album". He described Life Starts Now as a record about "confronting life and how fragile it can be". Speaking about the album, the guitarist, Barry Stock, said, "This time around we really wanted to go with something different than what we've done in the past."

The group began writing the album while on tour in 2007. However, with some time off, they returned to Toronto where the entire record was written. Pre-production began in January 2009, while the band began recording the music at The Warehouse Studio in Vancouver that March. The album was completed in August the same year. The group unveiled the cover art for Life Starts Now on August 19, 2009. The band hired an artist from Poland to create the artwork after they stumbled across their website. The cover features two masked men smashing a pile of televisions as winged creatures rise from the destruction, which the group felt "was a good reflection of the album's themes." After finalizing all aspects of the album, they officially announced that the album would be released on September 22, 2009. The album was made available for streaming on September 21.

The band performed at iHeartRadio in December 2009, to promote the album's release. The group embarked on the Life Starts Now Tour from November to December 2009, with support from Default and The Used. They continued to tour throughout 2010 with Breaking Benjamin joining them in support of the album. The band was later joined by Chevelle and Adelitas Way in March to April 2010. They also supported Nickelback on the Dark Horse Tour in September 2010 and Avenged Sevenfold on the Welcome to the Family Tour in May 2011.

== Composition ==
The album marks a departure from the angry tone of the band's previous releases into a lyrical style that is perceived as more optimistic. Confronted with overcoming problems such as sickness and death within their families, it reflects the maturity of the band members; in a published statement, they were quoted as saying: "We had to be inspired by it, but the outcome is this: It's a new beginning. It's life starting over." According to Sanderson, the group questioned life itself, which is a common thought they had when writing the album.

Musically, the group wanted to create a raw and organic record, focusing less on layering and avoid making the album sound overproduced and over-processed, compared to other bands at that time. According to Walst, the group cut back on layering as many guitars and decided to step it up to make the record more musical to create a "heavy sounding album." Stock stated that they took influences from the '70s, from groups such as Led Zeppelin. Speaking about the recording the process, Adam Gontier said they recorded the album in a live room together, capturing that "raw and real" sound the group wanted to accomplish.

== Commercial performance ==
The album debuted at number three on the Billboard 200, selling 79,000 copies in the US in its first week, thus becoming the band's highest-charting album in the US to date. The album also debuted on the Billboard Top Rock Albums chart at number two. In Canada, the album peaked at number two, selling 14,000 copies in its first week. The album's lead single "Break" peaked at number 26 on the Canadian Hot 100, as well as number one on the Billboard Hot Rock & Alternative Songs chart. "The Good Life" at number 52 on the Canadian Hot 100 and number one on Billboard Hot Rock & Alternative Songs chart. With the exception of "Lost in You", all of the band's singles from the album topped the Billboard Mainstream Rock chart. As of July 2010, the album had sold 398,826 units in the US.

== Reception ==
Professional ratings
Review scores
Source	Rating
About.com	2.5/5 stars
AllMusic	3/5 stars
Alternative Addiction	4.5/5 stars
Melodic	4/5 stars
Sputnikmusic	2/5 stars
Toronto Star	1/4 stars

Upon its release, Life Starts Now received mixed reviews from music critics. The AllMusic reviewer, James Christopher Monger, who gave the album three out of five stars, wrote, "Life Starts Now continues the theme of One-X, Gontier's personal demons, but with a hint of sunlight." He complimented the album, writing that it "treats the well-worn metal themes of anger, isolation, heartache, and redemption with the kind of begrudging respect they deserve, pumping out a competent flurry of fist-bump anthems and world-weary, mid-tempo rockers". Sputnikmusic gave the album a mixed review calling the album "rehash number two." A negative review came from the About.com reviewer, Tim Grierson, who wrote, "The problem isn't that Life Starts Now doesn't have good songs — the problem is that there aren't enough of them and that even the strongest moments feel overly familiar. Frontman Adam Gontier continues to expose his tortured soul, but without consistently gripping tunes to back up his anguish, Three Days Grace seem stuck in their misery rather than transcending it." Ben Rayner of the Toronto Star also gave the album a negative review, stating it possesses "no sound of its own, just a shallow range between Linkin Park and Nickelback." Kaj Roth gave a more positive review on the album stating, "This is without doubt their strongest album so far." He praised Gontier's melodies and Howard Benson's production on the album. Another positive review was written by Alternative Addiction, "There are several outstanding songs on this record, several of them that stand out more than others but the album still feels complete when listening to it from front to back [...] A record should capture a band at a certain point in time - kind of like a snapshot - this captures where Three Days Grace is at right now perfectly." Writing for Creative Loafing, Kristina Welch gave the album a positive review, remarking, "much of the album has a hopeful tone, a side of Three Days Grace that hasn't been presented until now [...] Life Starts Now is a great combination of the original, always-infuriated Three Days Grace and their fresher, more optimistic alter-ego."

=== Accolades ===
The album was nominated for Best Rock Album at the 2010 Juno Awards. It won the Favorite New Album award at the 2010 CASBY Awards. The album was officially certified 2× Platinum in Canada and 5× Platinum in the U.S. on May 21, 2026.

== Awards and nominations ==
Awards and nominations for Life Starts Now
Year	Organization	Award	Result	Ref(s)
2010	Juno Awards	Rock Album of the Year	Nominated	
2010	CASBY Awards	Favorite New Album	Won	

== Track listing ==
All tracks are written by Three Days Grace.

Standard edition
No.	Title	Length
1.	"Bitter Taste"	4:01
2.	"Break"	3:13
3.	"World So Cold"	4:03
4.	"Lost in You"	3:53
5.	"The Good Life"	2:53
6.	"No More"	3:45
7.	"Last to Know"	3:27
8.	"Someone Who Cares"	4:52
9.	"Bully"	3:39
10.	"Without You"	3:34
11.	"Goin' Down"	3:06
12.	"Life Starts Now"	3:08
Total length:		43:34

Japanese edition
No.	Title	Length
13.	"World So Cold" (piano version, also available on the Lost in You EP)	4:20
Total length:		47:54

Limited edition bonus CD
No.	Title	Length
1.	"I Hate Everything About You"	3:51
2.	"Just Like You"	3:08
3.	"Home"	4:21
4.	"Animal I Have Become"	3:51
5.	"Pain"	3:23
6.	"Never Too Late"	3:29
7.	"Riot"	3:28
Total length:		25:35

== Personnel ==
Credits for Life Starts Now adapted from the album's liner notes.

Three Days Grace

- Adam Gontier – lead vocals, rhythm guitar
- Neil Sanderson – drums, piano, backing vocals
- Brad Walst – bass guitar
- Barry Stock – lead guitar

Artwork

- Danny Clinch – photography
- Chris Feldman – art direction, design
- Jackie Murphy – art direction
- Adrian Knopik – illustration

Additional musicians

- Howard Benson – keyboards, programming

Production

- Howard Benson – producer
- Mike Cashin – assistant engineer
- Chris Lord-Alge – mixing
- Ted Jensen – mastering
- Paul DeCarli – digital editing
- Jon Nicholson – drum technician
- Hatsukazu "Hatch" Inagaki – engineers
- Mike Plotnikoff – engineers
- Andrew Schubert – engineers
- Brad Townsend – engineers
- Marc VanGool – guitar technician

Management

- Michael Tedesco – A&R

== Charts ==
=== Weekly charts ===
Weekly chart performance for Life Starts Now
Chart (2009–11)	Peak position
Australian Albums (ARIA)	77
Canadian Albums (Billboard)	2
Canadian Alternative Albums (Nielsen)	1
Canadian Metal Albums (Nielsen)	1
US Billboard 200	3
US Top Alternative Albums (Billboard)	2
US Top Hard Rock Albums (Billboard)	2
US Top Rock Albums (Billboard)	2

=== Year-end charts ===
Year-end chart performance for Life Starts Now
Chart (2009)	Position
Canadian Albums (Nielsen)	45
US Billboard 200	163
US Top Alternative Albums (Billboard)	30
US Top Hard Rock Albums (Billboard)	24
US Top Rock Albums (Billboard)	38
Chart (2010)	Position
US Billboard 200	153
US Top Alternative Albums (Billboard)	32
US Top Hard Rock Albums (Billboard)	13
US Top Rock Albums (Billboard)	41
Chart (2011)	Position
US Top Hard Rock Albums (Billboard)	36

== Certifications ==
Certifications for Life Starts Now
Region	Certification	Certified units/sales
Canada (Music Canada)	2× Platinum	160,000^{‡}
United States (RIAA)	5× Platinum	5,000,000^{‡}
^{‡} Sales+streaming figures based on certification alone.

== Release history ==
Release history and formats for Life Starts Now
Region	Date	Edition	Format	Label	Ref.
Various	September 22, 2009	Standard	CD; digital download	Jive	
Japan	November 4, 2009	Japanese bonus track	CD	Sony Music Japan	
Germany	November 27, 2009	Standard	CD	Sony BMG	
Various	September 23, 2016	Standard	LP	Sony Legacy	
