= Noble Street Studios =

Canadian recording studio located in Toronto, Ontario

Noble Street Studios is a recording studio located in Toronto, Ontario, Canada. The studio's clients have included Billy Talent, Three Days Grace, Danko Jones, Kanye West, The Tragically Hip, Barenaked Ladies, The Arkells, Feist, ASAP Rocky, Jarvis Church, Tyga, The Trews, Gavin Brown, Lenny DeRose, Alan Parsons, George Seara, Tori Hathaway, Michael Jack, Eric Ratz, Kenny Luong and The Weeknd.

== History ==
The studio opened its doors in 2011. It was designed by Athos Zaghi (AZA and Theatre Consultants Collaborative LLC,), and Robert Kastelic and acoustically engineered by Terry Medwedyk, of Group One Acoustics It houses two recording spaces; Studio A and Studio B. Both rooms feature Solid State Logic consoles. Studio A houses their Fazioli F212 Grand Piano. The studio includes a variety of professional recording, mixing and mastering equipment.

In 2013, the Noble Street Studios won a Toronto Urban Design Award of Excellence.

In 2015, Noble Street Studios was nominated for a Country Music Association Award as Best Recording Studio, and eight tracks recorded in the studio were nominated for Juno Awards.
