= The Creepshow =

Canadian psychobilly band

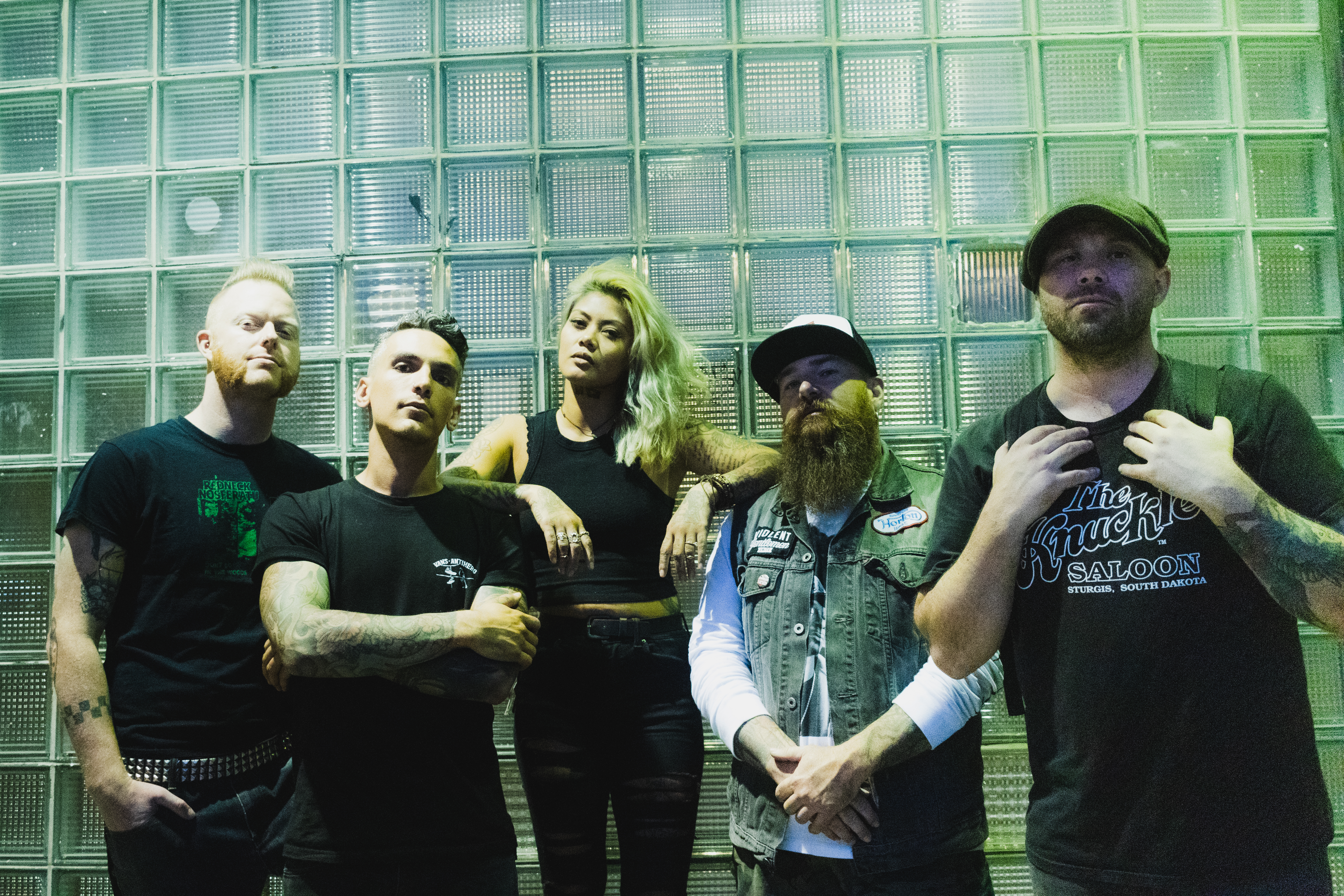
- The Creepshow, August 2019

Background information
- Origin: Burlington, Ontario, Canada
- Genres: Punk rock; psychobilly
- Years active: 2005–present
- Labels: Stomp; Stereo Dynamite; Hellcat
- Members: Sean "Sickboy" McNab; Paddy "The Reverend" McGinty; Alejandro "Ale" Serritiello; Kenda "Obi Wan Kendabi" Legaspi; Chuck "Dynamo" Coles
- Past members: Jen "Hellcat" Blackwood; Sandro Sanchioni; Matt "Pomade" Gee; Sarah Nicole "Sin" Blackwood
- Website: www.myspace.com/thecreepshow

The Creepshow is a Canadian rock band from Burlington, Ontario. The band formed in 2005 when the four original members got together with the purpose of starting a psychobilly band. The Creepshow writes the majority of their songs about horror films.

== Former bands ==
Most of The Creepshow's current and past members have been in various garage bands before. McNab was the singer/guitarist for Outspan and Jersey. McGinty was the songwriter and trombonist for ska band two-face and played trombone in Outspan as well. Matt "Pomade" Gee splits his time between The Creepshow and punk band Rehab for Quitters for which he also plays drums.

The Creepshow is known for their live shows as well as fast-paced songs filled with backup vocals from McNab and McGinty and sing-alongs that the whole crowd can participate in.

== Labels ==
Adam (DOOM) Sewell, the creator of Stereo Dynamite, signed the band in 2005 after hearing their demo and had them record two songs for Zombie Night in Canada Vol. 2. The band released their first album Sell Your Soul on Stereo Dynamite shortly after in May 2006.

On Monday, March 27, 2006, Stereo Dynamite signed an exclusive distribution deal with EMI Music Canada, increasing the label and band's distribution.

In August 2009, Hellcat Records announced they had signed The Creepshow and would be re-releasing their second album Run for Your Life in October. This signing was the first time a Canadian band had been signed to the California-based label. The Creepshow maintained their relationship with Stomp Records in Canada.

== Jen "Hellcat" Blackwood's departure ==
After Hellcat became pregnant, the vocals and guitar duties were taken over by Hellcat's younger sister, Sarah "Sin" on a temporary basis, and then permanently. Hellcat made her final appearance with the band in their video for "The Garden". In the summer of 2007, Hellcat began producing an album with her band Hellcat and the Prowl.

== Run For Your Life ==
On October 27, 2008, the band released their second album, Run for Your Life. The band once again recorded with Sell Your Soul recorder/producer Steve Rizun. The album was released by Stomp Records and was re-released in the US on Hellcat Records in October 2009.

The band continued to tour with Blackwood as the lead vocalist, including a tour with The Unseen and Tiger Army. In an interview with Exclaim! magazine, Blackwood said that "Downtime has been good, but it's always the same. After about two weeks we all get that itch. And after three weeks our pockets are empty and we're like 'Okay, we need to go back on tour, I am going crazy!"

On August 23, 2008, the band joined Anti Flag on a Canadian Tour after which they made their way back to Europe in October in support of their new album. The Creepshow played the Warped Tour in 2008 on the D-Tox/Union stage in Montreal.

The band toured North America and Europe in early 2009. In August 2009, the band had two successful gigs in Russia. In September 2009, the band announced a U.S. tour through October.

On February 26, 2010, the band performed in the Australian alternative festival, Soundwave, on one of two main stages. On July 17, 2010, the band performed at the Hot Rod Hootenanny in Niagara Falls, Ontario. On October 25, the band performed in Prague, Czech Republic at the club Cross. On December 12, 2010, the band played alongside Random Hand, The Skints, The Hydropaths, Acid Drop and Mouthwash for the Slam Dunk punk/ska all dayer at the Cockpit in Leeds, England. Following a tour of Europe, they regrouped to begin material for their fourth album.

== Sarah "Sin" Blackwood's departure ==
In January 2012, Sarah Blackwood guested with fellow Burlington, Ontario, band Walk off the Earth on a cover of Gotye's song Somebody That I Used To Know. The resulting video on YouTube went viral, gathering over 127 million views in four months and received positive responses from both Gotye and his co-singer on the song, Kimbra. In February 2012, the music industry publication Crazed Hits reported that the band had signed a recording contract with Columbia Records.

The Creepshow had announced a tour of Europe and North America for the late summer - including dates in the United Kingdom in August. However, Walk Off The Earth soon announced a tour of their own, and on July 16, Blackwood uploaded a farewell video to her YouTube page, announcing she was leaving The Creepshow. Blackwood went on to join Walk Off The Earth on a permanent basis, starting with their Autumn tour and EP, R.E.V.O.

== Kenda "Twisted" Legaspi's arrival ==
On July 16, 2012, the same day that Sarah Blackwood uploaded her YouTube video, the band released a statement on their Facebook page, announcing her departure and successor in one fell swoop. They said:

Hey there Creeps,
We know there's been a lot of rumours circulating out there lately, so we just wanted to fill you in on what's happening to put the speculation to rest. As you all know, Sarah is involved in a lot of different musical projects including her own solo project and Walk Off The Earth. Unfortunately it's simply not possible for her to devote herself to all of these awesome projects full-time so we were faced with a really difficult decision. We talked it all over together and looked at this from every possible angle, but it's with a heavy heart that we're announcing that Sarah "SIN" Blackwood will be leaving the Creepshow.

After 5+ years, two albums, several singles and countless tours with the band, Sarah will be sorely missed not just as a bandmate but as a great friend. We honestly couldn't be happier for her and we wish her all the very best with her music and new adventures. The Creepshow has always been about playing shows, putting out great songs and having a wicked time with our fans so with that said, the show must go on...

We'd also like to take this opportunity to let y'all know that our good friend Kenda will be stepping up to take over vocal duties. Kenda is a fixture in the Hamilton/Toronto music scene as both an accomplished singer and prolific tattoo artist. Please take a moment to welcome Kenda to the Creepshow family! We're currently working on writing new songs and sharpening up our live show…and we'll be sharing a brand new track with you in the weeks to come! Stay tuned for exciting news, tour announcements and much more!

- if you have any negative comments, we would appreciate you keeping them to yourself.

Kenda's first dates with The Creepshow were Hamilton on Friday, July 27, 2012, and Toronto the following day. The band then played four dates in Germany, before embarking upon a UK tour in August. In September, they played across North America, including some support slots with Dropkick Murphys. In October and November, they performed a headline tour of Canada, with support coming from The Fundamentals and The Hellbound Hepcats. On New Year's Eve, 2012, they supported NOFX in Montreal.

== Life After Death ==
On January 7, 2013, the band announced via their Facebook page that they were recording demos for their new album in Toronto.

They released a single "Sinners & Saints" on July 16, 2013 via digital download and limited edition 7" brown vinyl.

The album, titled Life After Death, was released on October 21, 2013.

The band continued to tour into their tenth anniversary year, including dates in the UK in 2015. They headlined the Arena at Rebellion Festival 2015 on Sunday 9 August.

The song "Blood Blood Blood" appears in the closing credits of Borderlands 3's DLC "Psycho Krieg and the Fantastic Fustercluck".

== Band members ==
=== Current ===
- Kenda "Twisted" Legaspi - Lead Vocals / guitar
- Sean "Sickboy" McNab - upright bass / Backup Vocals
- Kristian "The Reverend" Rowles (Paddy McGinty) - Keys / Backup Vocals
- Ale Serritiello - drums
- Chuck Coles - lead guitar

== Discography ==
=== Studio albums ===
- Sell Your Soul (Stereo Dynamite, 2006) - LP
- Run for Your Life (Stomp Records, 2008) - LP
- They All Fall Down (Stomp Records, 2010) - LP
- Life After Death (Stomp Records, 2013) - LP
- Death at My Door (Stomp Records, 2017) - LP

=== Vinyl Releases ===
Sell Your Soul

- Crazy Love Records, Germany (2006) - Black /?, Red /100, Orange /100
- People Like You Records, Europe (2009) - Orange/Black Splatter /250, Orange/Green Splatter /250
- Stereo Dynamite Records, Canada (2010) - Green /150, Orange /150, White /100, Red/Black Splatter /100

Run For Your Life

- Stomp Records, Canada (2008) - Clear Green /300 (1st Press), Green /250 (2nd Press), Purple Marble /250 (2nd Press)
- People Like You Records, Europe (2008) - Green Marble /250, Red/Green Splatter /250

Creepy Christmas Classics

- Stereo Dynamite Records, Canada (2008) - Black /500, Red /250, Green /250

They All Fall Down

- Stomp Records, Canada (2010) - Picture Disc /1000
- People Like You Records, Europe (2010) - Black /?, Purple /500

Life After Death

- Stomp Records, Canada (2013) - White vinyl

Death At My Door

- Concrete Jungle Records, Europe (2017) - Red/Black Marbled /1000
- Stomp Records, Canada (2017) - Black 180 Gram /100, Blood Red Marbled /200, Creepy Clear with Smoke /200

=== Singles ===
- Sinners & Saints (2013)

=== 7" vinyl ===
Creepy Christmas Classics! (Stereo Dynamite, 2008)

- Limited edition of 1000 copies.
- included the following tracks
- "Santa Claus Is Back In Town" (Elvis Presley cover)
- "Merry Christmas (I Don't Want To Fight Tonight)" (Ramones cover)

=== Music Videos ===
- Zombies Ate Her Brain (2007)
- The Garden (2007)
- Take My Hand (2008)
- Buried Alive (2010)
- They All Fall Down (2010)
- Hellbound (2010)
- Sleep Tight (2011)
- Sinners And Saints (2013)
- The Devil's Son (2013)
- Sticks & Stones (2017)
- Death At My Door (2017)
- My Soul To Keep (2018)

=== Compilations ===
- Zombie Night in Canada Vol. 2 (Stumble Records, 2005) - "Shake"

== See also ==
- List of bands from Canada
- List of psychobilly bands
