= Somebody That I Used to Know =

2011 single by Gotye featuring Kimbra

Single by Gotye featuring Kimbra

from the album Making Mirrors
- Released: 5 July 2011
- Recorded: January–May 2011
- Studio: The Barn (Merricks); Lucas Taranto's lounge room (Melbourne, Australia)
- Genre: Art pop; alternative rock
- Length: 4:04
- Label: Eleven; Universal; V2
- Songwriters: Wally De Backer; Luiz Bonfá
- Producer: Wally De Backer

Gotye singles chronology
| "Eyes Wide Open" (2010) | "Somebody That I Used to Know" (2011) | "I Feel Better" (2011) |

Kimbra singles chronology
| "Cameo Lover" (2011) | "Somebody That I Used to Know" (2011) | "Good Intent" (2011) |

Music video
- "Somebody That I Used to Know" on YouTube

"Somebody That I Used to Know" is a song written, produced, and performed by the Belgian-Australian singer-songwriter Gotye (aka Wally de Backer), featuring vocals from the New Zealand singer Kimbra. The song was released in Australia and New Zealand through Eleven Music on 5 July 2011 as the second single from Gotye's third studio album, Making Mirrors (2011). It was later released by Universal Music in December 2011 in the United Kingdom, and 20 January 2012 in Ireland and the United States.

"Somebody That I Used to Know" was written and recorded by Gotye at his parents' house on the Mornington Peninsula in Victoria, Australia, and is lyrically related to the experiences he has had with romantic relationships. The song is a mid-tempo ballad. It samples Luiz Bonfá's instrumental "Seville" from his album, Luiz Bonfá Plays Great Songs (1967) with percussion over a xylophone melody from the Joseph Cooper and Sinfonia of London 1961 LP A Child's Introduction to the Instruments of the Orchestra, which is based on "Baa, Baa, Black Sheep", and also the song samples "Woke Up This Morning" by Mexicali Brass, the song describes the aftermath of a romantic relationship from both parties' perspectives.

Commercially, "Somebody That I Used to Know" was a global success and became both artists' signature song. It reached the top of the charts in Australia, New Zealand, the United Kingdom and the United States, as well as 25 other official charts, and reached the top 10 in more than 30 countries. It was the most commercially successful recording of 2011 in Flanders (Belgium), the most successful of 2012 in Canada, Israel, the United Kingdom, the United States and Wallonia (Belgium), and the most successful of the 2010s decade by an Australian artist in Australia. It is certified multi-platinum in ten countries, including diamond in Australia, Brazil and United States. Globally, "Somebody That I Used to Know" had sold more than 13 million copies by September 2012, becoming one of the best-selling digital singles ever. In addition to the Hot 100, it was also placed at the top of Billboard's Year-End Adult Top 40 and Alternative Airplay charts, and many other charts around the world.

The song won the Triple J Hottest 100 poll at the end of 2011 as well as ARIA Music Awards for Song of the Year and Best Video; Kimbra was voted "Best Female Artist" while Gotye was named "Best Male Artist" and "Producer of the Year". At the 55th Grammy Awards, "Somebody That I Used to Know" was awarded Best Pop Duo/Group Performance and Record of the Year. The song has also been performed several times on major American television shows including The Voice, American Idol and Saturday Night Live. In 2025 the song was voted 10th in the Triple J Hottest 100 of Australian Songs. In 2025, rapper Doechii sampled the song on "Anxiety", which also earned various Grammy nominations.

As of September 2026, it has been streamed more than 2.5 billion times on Spotify, with 22.3 million listeners over the previous month.

== Composition and recording ==
Gotye discussed writing "Somebody That I Used to Know" in an interview with Sound on Sound:

"Writing 'Somebody' was a gradual and linear process. I started with the Luiz Bonfa sample, then I found the drums, and after that I started working on the lyric and the melody, and added the wobbly guitar-sample melody. After that, I took a break, and a few weeks later I came back to the session and decided on the chorus chord progression, wrote the chorus melody, and combined that with sounds like the Latin loop and some of the percussion and the flute sounds that further filled the space. At that point I hit a brick wall. I was thinking: 'This is pretty good, how can I get to the end really quickly?' and I was trying to take lazy decisions to finish the song. I considered repeating the chorus, an instrumental bridge, a change in tempo or key, I even considered finishing the song after the first chorus. But nothing felt like it was strong enough. So the third session was all about writing the female part and changing the perspective. The arrangement of 'Somebody' is reflective of me moving towards using sounds that provide me with inspiration for a texture or a platform for an idea, and then through sonic manipulation and coming up with original melodies and harmonic ideas to make it my own. I guess the balance of sounds taken from records and samples I created myself is perhaps 50–50."

"Somebody That I Used to Know" (2011)
A 23-second sample of "Somebody That I Used to Know", featuring the first chorus as sung by Gotye, showing the octave leap in respect to the previous verse.

"Somebody That I Used to Know" is a mid-tempo art pop and alternative rock song and has a length of four minutes and five seconds. Lyrically, the song describes the aftermath of a romantic relationship from both parties' perspectives.

Gotye uses a sample of Brazilian jazz guitarist Luiz Bonfá's 1967 instrumental song "Seville", with additional instrumentations of beats and a xylophone playing a melody based on "Baa, Baa, Black Sheep", from the 1961 LP A Child's Introduction to the Instruments of the Orchestra by Joseph Cooper and Sinfonia of London. It was written and produced by Gotye himself, while in his parents' barn on the Mornington Peninsula, Victoria. Gotye commented that he wrote the song "in quite a linear way", explaining that "I wrote the first verse, the second verse, and I'd got to the end of the first chorus and for the first time ever I thought, 'There's no interesting way to add to this guy's story'. It felt weak."

The track was recorded between January and May 2011, with Gotye struggling to find a suitable female vocalist, after a "high-profile female vocalist" cancelled the collaboration at the last minute. He tested his girlfriend, Tash Parker, but "somehow their happiness meant that it didn't work out" so he followed the recommendation of the song's sound engineer and mixer, François Tétaz, and used Kimbra's vocals. Martin Davies from Click Music considered the song "instantly captivating", and named Kimbra's voice "clean and sugar-soaked", further commenting that it bears an "uncanny resemblance" to singer Katy Perry.

Gotye stated that the song was "definitely drawn from various experiences I've had in relationships breaking up, and in the parts of the more reflective parts of the song, in the aftermath and the memory of those different relationships and what they were and how they broke up and what's going on in everyone's minds. Yeah, so it's an amalgam of different feelings but not completely made up as such." In an interview with Rolling Stone (Australia), he described the song as "a curated reflection of multiple past relationships".

== Music video ==
Gotye and Kimbra sing while painted to blend with the background.

The music video for "Somebody That I Used to Know" was produced, directed and edited by Australian artist Natasha Pincus and filmed by Australian cinematographer Warwick Field. It shows Gotye and Kimbra naked throughout the clip, and as they sing, his skin is gradually painted into the backdrop via stop motion animation. The video's background is based on a 1980s artwork created by Gotye's father, Frank de Backer, who also designed the cover art for the related album, Making Mirrors. Emma Hack, an Australian artist and skin illustrator based in Adelaide, was hired by Pincus to work on the body paintings for Gotye and Kimbra. Melbourne scenic artist Howard Clark painted the backdrop. According to Hack, it took more than 23 hours to paint both Gotye and Kimbra to fit with Howard's background. Their painting symbolises their combined relationship.

Before its official premiere, the music video was leaked on Take 40 Australia's website. According to Pincus, "It was stolen out of our system. I guess it's always wanted to get out there. Within five minutes it was everywhere". On 30 July 2011, it was officially premiered on YouTube and on the Australian music show Rage. The music video was well received for its artistic style, picking up 200,000 views in its first two weeks, as well as receiving promotion on Twitter by actor Ashton Kutcher and Katy Perry.

"What a video!" Snow Patrol's Gary Lightbody enthused to Q. "I have become obsessed with it and not just because I'm in love with Kimbra. Gotye himself is an engaging character for sure... his solemnly expressive eyes finish a journey his lyrics only begin. 'Told myself that you were right for me but felt so lonely in your company' – simple, pure, and devastating. None more than the title line when it speaks of the end of love with prosaic brutality: 'Now you're just somebody that I used to know.' Great video, powerful lyrics, and a stunning voice. Oh, and Kimbra... my poor heart..."

On 1 November 2022, the video hit 2 billion views and 13 million likes on YouTube. The video for "Somebody That I Used to Know" was voted number 1 in the annual Rage Fifty countdown. Andy Samberg and Taran Killam parodied the video in a Saturday Night Live "digital short" that coincided with Gotye's 14 April 2012 performance on the show. The video was nominated for Video of the Year and Best Editing in a Video at the 2012 MTV Video Music Awards. As of January 2015, Billboard named the video as one of the 20 best of the 2010s (up to that point in time).

== Critical reception ==
The song received universal acclaim.

Take 40 Australia elaborated on the audience's reception at the July 2011 Splendour in the Grass festival: "Gotye's latest song featuring Kimbra 'Somebody That I Used to Know' had become somewhat of an unofficial anthem for the festival ... every car was cranking it over their speakers all day, every day ... and the question on everyone's lips was whether or not Kimbra would join him on the track. Fortunately, dreams came true ... he smashed out an incredible set climaxing with a version of the song with Kimbra on co-lead vocals that people couldn't stop talking about all weekend long". AllMusic's Jon O'Brien felt the track was an "unexpected chart-topper ... [it] is an oddball break-up song whose stuttering rhythms, reggae hooks, and hushed vocals sound like The Police as remixed by the xx". Writing for Digital Spy, Lewis Corner rated the song four stars out of five and described it as "a Bon Iver-styled ballad for the music-buying masses".

Entertainment Weekly ranked the song at number 2 on their "Best singles of 2012" list: "When a funny-named Aussie and his New Zealand sidekick first emerged with a quirky, minimalist breakup ballad, it seemed like the least likely candidate for a Hot 100 No. 1 since 'Macarena'." MTV ranked the song at number 3 on their "Best Songs of 2012" list. PopMatters ranked the song at number 14 on their "The 75 best songs of 2012" list: "Gotye manages to balance real nuanced emotions of a tortured heart bested only when the woman he is pouring his heart out to takes the stage revealing his inability to see past his own nose". Metro placed "Somebody That I Used to Know" on their "Top 10 annoying songs of 2012" list: "According to the internet there is going to be an apocalypse on Friday, but you can be sure that once the dust has settled the plinky plonky xylophone intro of this inexorable viral hit will drift into earshot, as if emanating from the scorched earth itself".

John Watson, who co-manages Gotye with Danny Rogers, said of the single's success: "We've never seen any song make a deeper or more immediate connection with so many people. It's a really special recording and video". Talking about the overwhelming reception and the amount of coverage received, Gotye commented that "I don't really feel like it [the song] belongs to me anymore". He further explained that "sometimes I feel like I'm a bit sick of it. My inbox, on any given day, has at least five covers or parodies or remixes of it and there's only so many times you can listen to the one song."

=== Accolades ===
In July 2011, the song finished third in the Vanda & Young Global Songwriting Competition Earlier that year, Gotye had first noticed Kimbra when both were shortlisted as finalists for the competition.

At the ARIA Music Awards of 2011, "Somebody That I Used to Know" won Single of the Year, Best Pop Release, Best Video (for Natasha Pincus), Engineer of the Year (for François Tétaz) and Producer of the Year (for Gotye). Gotye also won Best Male Artist for the song while Kimbra won Best Female Artist for her previous single, "Cameo Lover".

At the APRA Music Awards of 2012, "Somebody That I Used to Know" won Most Played Australian Work and Song of the Year and Gotye won Songwriter of the Year. The song also won Single of the Year and Best Video Clip at the Belgian Music Industry Awards (MIAs) in 2012, and was nominated at the 2012 Teen Choice Awards for "Choice Rock Song" and "Choice Break-Up Song".

In the 55th Annual Grammy Awards in 2013, "Somebody That I Used to Know" won Record Of The Year, with credits to Wally De Backer (Gotye) as producer; De Backer & Tetaz as engineers/mixers, and William Bowden, mastering engineer. The song also won the Grammy Award for Best Pop Duo/Group Performance as performed by Gotye and Kimbra. Making Mirrors took home the Grammy Award for Best Alternative Music Album, with Gotye credited as producer and Tetaz as engineer/mixer.

=== Later recognition ===
In 2019, Stereogum ranked the song as the 161st best song of the 2010s. In January 2018, as part of Triple M's "Ozzest 100", "Somebody That I Used to Know" was ranked number 98.

In 2021, its first year of eligibility, "Somebody That I Used to Know" was inducted into the National Film and Sound Archive's Sounds of Australia as an Australian sound recording with "cultural, historical and aesthetic significance."

== Commercial performance ==
In the week commencing 18 July 2011, "Somebody That I Used to Know" debuted at number 27 on the ARIA Singles Chart. It was released on 5 July 2011 in Australia and New Zealand by Eleven Music as the second single from his third studio album, Making Mirrors (2011). Despite an initial lack of airplay on major radio stations, the song reached number 1 in the week ending 15 August, becoming the first single by either artist to do so and their most successful single. Until 2014, the song was one of the two-second-longest-running Australian number-one songs, with eight weeks at the top, tied with Savage Garden's 1997 song "Truly Madly Deeply", and behind Daddy Cool's 1971 hit "Eagle Rock", which stayed there for ten weeks. In August 2011, the song was released in Belgium and the Netherlands. After a few weeks in the charts, it reached number 1 in both countries, topping the Belgian Singles Chart for 12 weeks. Also in August, "Somebody That I Used to Know" debuted at number 4 in New Zealand on the RIANZ Singles Chart, reaching number 1 three weeks later, thus making Gotye the first Australian artist to reach number 1 since Guy Sebastian did so in February 2011 with "Who's That Girl". The song debuted on the Irish Singles Chart on 13 January 2012 at number 47, later reaching number 1 position. In the United Kingdom, "Somebody That I Used to Know" spent five non-consecutive weeks at number 1.

In the United States, it debuted at number 91 on the Billboard Hot 100 on 21 January 2012. In its fifteenth week on the chart – after it was performed by Matt Bomer and Darren Criss on Glee on 10 April; by Phillip Phillips and Elise Testone on the eleventh season of American Idol before more than 16 million viewers on 11 April; and by Gotye and Kimbra on Saturday Night Live on 14 April – the song rose to number 1, where it stayed for eight consecutive weeks. thus becoming the longest-running number 1 by a solo male artist since Flo Rida's "Low" led for ten weeks in 2008. The song had the fourth highest-selling single week ever with 542,000 digital downloads sold, and was the first Australian single to top the Hot 100 since Savage Garden's "I Knew I Loved You" in 2000. The song also topped the Alternative Songs chart for 12 weeks tying with Fuel's "Hemorrhage (In My Hands)" and Linkin Park's "Numb" and "New Divide", as well as topping the Radio Songs, Digital Songs, On-Demand Songs, Pop Songs, Adult Pop Songs, Adult Contemporary, and Hot Dance Club Songs charts in that country.

On 2 May 2012 the song became the first to reach digital sales of at least 400,000 for three consecutive weeks, and the following week it became the first to simultaneously top the Alternative Songs, Hot Dance Club Songs, and Dance Mix Show Airplay charts. It also became the number 1 song of 2012 on the Alternative Songs, Adult Pop Songs, and Billboard Hot 100 charts. Globally, "Somebody That I Used to Know" had sold more than 13 million copies by September 2012, becoming one of the best-selling digital singles ever.

By 22 February 2013, the song became the tenth longest-charting song in the history of the Billboard Hot 100, at 59 weeks on the chart. As of October 2015, the song has sold 7.9 million copies in the US, making it the country's fourth all-time best-selling digital single.

"Somebody That I Used to Know" reached number one in more than 23 national charts and charted inside the top ten in more than 30 countries around the world. By the end of 2012, the song became the best-selling song of that year with 11.8 million copies sold, ranking among the best-selling digital singles ever. As of April 2012, it is the most downloaded song ever in Belgium, as well as being the third best-selling digital single in Germany with sales between 500,000 and 600,000 copies, and the most successful song in the history of the Dutch charts. As of January 2013, it has received eleven platinum certifications in Australia, accounting for shipments exceeding 770,000 units. In New Zealand, it was certified four times platinum. The song was the best-selling single of 2012 in the UK with 1,318,000 copies sold.

Gotye has not monetised the song or any of his others through advertisements on YouTube, as he believes that there is too much advertising in the world. He has licensed its use to student films free of charge, but has turned down approaches from some commercial films: "If someone wants to use it commercially I look at what the budget is and the creativity of the project".

As of August 2026, it has been streamed more than 3.2 billion times on Spotify, with 22.3 million listeners over the previous month.

== Television and film ==
In February 2012, Gotye made his American television debut on Jimmy Kimmel Live! where he performed the song.

The song has been featured on the TV series 90210, and Gossip Girl, The song was also featured in the film Boyhood.

== Track listings ==
Digital download

1. "Somebody That I Used to Know" (Gotye featuring Kimbra) – 4:04
2. "Somebody That I Used to Know" (radio mix) (Gotye featuring Kimbra) – 3:33
3. "Somebody That I Used to Know" (instrumental) (Gotye) – 4:04

Digital download – remix

1. "Somebody That I Used to Know" (Tiësto remix) (Gotye featuring Kimbra) – 4:33

7-inch vinyl single

1. "Somebody That I Used to Know" (Gotye featuring Kimbra) – 4:04
2. "Bronte" – 3:13

CD single

1. "Somebody That I Used to Know" (Gotye featuring Kimbra) – 4:04
2. "Easy Way Out" – 1:57

Japanese promotional CD single

1. "Somebody That I Used to Know" (Gotye featuring Kimbra) – 4:04
2. "Somebody That I Used to Know" (Tiësto remix) (Gotye featuring Kimbra) – 4:33

Live at the Songroom S02e09 (2020)
| No. | Title | Length |
|---|---|---|
| 11. | "Somebody That I Used to Know" (Gotye featuring the Basics and Monty Cotton) | 4:47 |

== Credits and personnel ==
- Gotye – songwriter, producer, assistant mixer, recording, lead and backing vocals, guitar, synthesizer, xylophone, flutes, percussion, samples
- François Tétaz – mixer, engineer
- Lucas Taranto – bass guitar
- Kimbra – lead and backing vocals
- William Bowden – mastering
- Ralph Thane – remixer (radio mix)
- Frank De Backer – artwork (back and inside cover painting, handwriting)
- Kat Kallady – artwork (front cover painting)

Credits adapted from "Somebody That I Used to Know" CD single liner notes.

== Charts ==
=== Weekly charts ===
Weekly chart performance
| Chart (2011–2025) | Peak position |
|---|---|
| Australia (ARIA) | 1 |
| Austria (Ö3 Austria Top 40) | 1 |
| Belgium (Ultratop 50 Flanders) | 1 |
| Belgium (Ultratop 50 Wallonia) | 1 |
| Bulgaria Airplay (BAMP) | 2 |
| Canada Hot 100 (Billboard) | 1 |
| Canada AC (Billboard) | 5 |
| Canada CHR/Top 40 (Billboard) | 1 |
| Canada Hot AC (Billboard) | 1 |
| Canada Rock (Billboard) | 5 |
| Croatia International Airplay (Top lista) | 1 |
| Czech Republic Airplay (ČNS IFPI) | 1 |
| Denmark (Tracklisten) | 1 |
| Finland (Suomen virallinen lista) | 1 |
| France (SNEP) | 1 |
| Germany (GfK) | 1 |
| Global 200 (Billboard) | 129 |
| Greece Digital Songs (Billboard) | 2 |
| Honduras Airplay (Honduras Top 50) | 33 |
| Hungary (Dance Top 40) | 1 |
| Hungary (Rádiós Top 40) | 1 |
| Iceland (Tónlistinn) | 4 |
| Ireland (IRMA) | 1 |
| Israel International Airplay (Media Forest) | 1 |
| Italy (FIMI) | 1 |
| Japan Hot 100 (Billboard) | 10 |
| Mexico Airplay (Billboard) | 8 |
| Portugal Digital Songs (Billboard) | 2 |
| Netherlands (Dutch Top 40) | 1 |
| Netherlands (Single Top 100) | 1 |
| New Zealand (Recorded Music NZ) | 1 |
| Norway (VG-lista) | 2 |
| Poland Airplay (ZPAV) | 1 |
| Romania Airplay (Airplay 100) | 1 |
| Russia Airplay (TopHit) Bastian Van Shield Remix | 1 |
| Scottish Singles Sales (Official Charts) | 1 |
| Slovakia Airplay (ČNS IFPI) | 1 |
| Slovenia Airplay (SloTop50) | 17 |
| Spain (Promusicae) | 3 |
| Spain Airplay (Nielsen Soundscan) | 1 |
| Sweden (Sverigetopplistan) | 1 |
| Switzerland (Schweizer Hitparade) | 2 |
| UK Singles (Official Charts) | 1 |
| Ukraine Airplay (TopHit) Bastian Van Shield Remix | 9 |
| US Billboard Hot 100 | 1 |
| US Adult Alternative Airplay (Billboard) | 1 |
| US Adult Contemporary (Billboard) | 1 |
| US Adult Pop Airplay (Billboard) | 1 |
| US Alternative Airplay (Billboard) | 1 |
| US Dance Airplay (Billboard) | 1 |
| US Dance Club Songs (Billboard) | 1 |
| US Hot Rock & Alternative Songs (Billboard) | 1 |
| US Pop Airplay (Billboard) | 1 |
| US Rhythmic Airplay (Billboard) | 10 |
| Venezuela Pop Rock General (Record Report) | 1 |

Weekly chart performance
| Chart (2024) | Peak position |
|---|---|
| Moldova Airplay (TopHit) | 86 |

=== Year-end charts ===
Year-end chart performance
| Chart (2011) | Position |
|---|---|
| Australia (ARIA) | 2 |
| Belgium (Ultratop 50 Flanders) | 1 |
| Belgium (Ultratop 50 Wallonia) | 73 |
| Germany (Media Control Charts) | 32 |
| Netherlands (Dutch Top 40) | 5 |
| Netherlands (Mega Single Top 100) | 3 |
| New Zealand (RIANZ) | 3 |

Year-end chart performance
| Chart (2012) | Position |
|---|---|
| Australia (ARIA) | 40 |
| Austria (Ö3 Austria Top 40) | 2 |
| Belgian (Ultratop 50 Flanders) | 10 |
| Belgian (Ultratop 50 Wallonia) | 1 |
| Brazil (Crowley) | 12 |
| Canada (Canadian Hot 100) | 1 |
| France (SNEP) | 2 |
| Germany (Media Control Charts) | 4 |
| Hungary (Dance Top 40) | 6 |
| Hungary (Rádiós Top 40) | 2 |
| Israel (Media Forest) | 1 |
| Italy (FIMI) | 4 |
| Italy Airplay (EarOne) | 4 |
| Netherlands (Dutch Top 40) | 34 |
| Netherlands (Mega Single Top 100) | 13 |
| New Zealand (RIANZ) | 11 |
| Poland (ZPAV) | 2 |
| Romania (Romanian Top 100) | 2 |
| Russia Airplay (TopHit) | 5 |
| Spain (PROMUSICAE) | 6 |
| Sweden (Sverigetopplistan) | 2 |
| Switzerland (Schweizer Hitparade) | 2 |
| Ukraine Airplay (TopHit) | 67 |
| UK Singles (OCC) | 1 |
| US Billboard Hot 100 | 1 |
| US Adult Contemporary (Billboard) | 6 |
| US Adult Top 40 (Billboard) | 1 |
| US Dance Club Songs (Billboard) | 6 |
| US Dance/Mix Show Airplay (Billboard) | 8 |
| US Mainstream Top 40 (Billboard) | 8 |
| US Hot Rock Songs (Billboard) | 4 |
| US Rhythmic (Billboard) | 40 |

Year-end chart performance
| Chart (2013) | Position |
|---|---|
| France (SNEP) | 131 |
| Hungary (Dance Top 40) | 56 |
| Hungary (Rádiós Top 40) | 100 |
| Russia Airplay (TopHit) | 7 |
| Slovenia (SloTop50) | 33 |
| Ukraine Airplay (TopHit) | 145 |
| US Adult Contemporary (Billboard) | 13 |

=== Decade-end charts ===
Decade-end chart performance
| Chart (2010–2019) | Position |
|---|---|
| Australia (ARIA) | 2 |
| Australian Artist Singles (ARIA) | 1 |
| Germany (Official German Charts) | 21 |
| Netherlands (Single Top 100) | 11 |
| UK Singles (OCC) | 42 |
| US Billboard Hot 100 | 8 |

=== All-time charts ===
All-time chart performance
| Chart | Position |
|---|---|
| US Billboard Hot 100 | 36 |
| UK Singles (OCC) | 40 |

== Certifications and sales ==
Certifications and sales
| Region | Certification | Certified units/sales |
|---|---|---|
| Australia (ARIA) | 26× Platinum | 1,820,000^{‡} |
| Austria (IFPI Austria) | 2× Platinum | 60,000^{*} |
| Belgium (BRMA) | 4× Platinum | 120,000^{*} |
| Brazil (Pro-Música Brasil) | 2× Diamond | 500,000^{‡} |
| Canada | — | 653,000 |
| Denmark (IFPI Danmark) | 3× Platinum | 90,000^{^} |
| Finland (Musiikkituottajat) | Gold | 6,774 |
| Germany (BVMI) | 4× Platinum | 1,200,000^{‡} |
| Italy (FIMI) | 4× Platinum | 120,000^{*} |
| New Zealand (RMNZ) | 9× Platinum | 270,000^{‡} |
| Portugal (AFP) | 3× Platinum | 75,000^{‡} |
| Spain (Promusicae) | 3× Platinum | 180,000^{‡} |
| Sweden (GLF) | Platinum | 40,000^{‡} |
| Switzerland (IFPI Switzerland) | 3× Platinum | 90,000^{^} |
| United Kingdom (BPI) | 6× Platinum | 3,600,000^{‡} |
| United States (RIAA) | 17× Platinum | 17,000,000^{‡} |
Streaming
| Denmark (IFPI Danmark) | 4× Platinum | 7,200,000^{†} |
^{*} Sales figures based on certification alone.^{^} Shipments figures based on certification alone.^{‡} Sales+streaming figures based on certification alone.^{†} Streaming-only figures based on certification alone.

== Release history ==
| Country | Date | Format | Label | Version |
|---|---|---|---|---|
| Australia | 5 July 2011 | Digital download | Samples 'n' Seconds Records / Eleven Music | Album version |
| New Zealand | 5 July 2011 | Digital download | Samples 'n' Seconds Records / Eleven Music | Album version |
| Belgium | 29 July 2011 | Digital download | Samples 'n' Seconds Records / V2 Benelux | Album version |
| Netherlands | 29 July 2011 | Digital download | Samples 'n' Seconds Records / V2 Benelux | Album version |
| Germany | 11 November 2011 | Digital download | Samples 'n' Seconds Records / Universal Music | Album version |
| United Kingdom | 30 December 2011 | Digital download | Samples 'n' Seconds Records / Universal Island Records | Album version |
| United States | 20 January 2012 | Digital download | Samples 'n' Seconds Records / Universal Music | Album version |
| United States | 12 March 2012 | Contemporary hit radio | Fairfax Records / Universal Republic Records | Album version |
| United States | 17 April 2012 | Digital download | Samples 'n' Seconds Records / Universal Music | Tiësto remix |
| United Kingdom | 4 May 2012 | Digital download | Samples 'n' Seconds Records / Universal Island Records | Tiësto remix |

== Covers and remixes ==
=== Walk Off the Earth version ===
"Somebody That I Used to Know"

Single by Walk Off the Earth

from the album R.E.V.O.
- Released: 6 January 2012
- Recorded: December 2011
- Genre: Indie rock; acoustic rock
- Length: 4:08
- Label: Columbia
- Songwriters: Wally De Backer, Luiz Bonfá
- Producer: Gianni Luminati

Walk Off the Earth singles chronology
| "Somebody That I Used to Know" (2012) | "Red Hands" (2012) |

In January 2012, Canadian indie rock group Walk Off the Earth uploaded a cover of "Somebody That I Used to Know" to YouTube. Their version uses a single guitar played simultaneously by all five band members.

Also in January 2012, Walk off the Earth had their U.S. television debut on The Ellen DeGeneres Show, recreating the single-guitar performance live. Saying that she wanted to "help," DeGeneres humorously gifted the group with a matched set of five electric guitars.

As of April 2012, the song had sold 187,000 units in the United States. As of February 2023, the 3 identical YouTube postings of the video have received a total of over 214 million views.

==== Track listing ====
- CD single
1. "Somebody That I Used to Know" – 4:08
2. "Somebody That I Used to Know" (music video) – 4:25
- CD maxi-single
1. "Somebody That I Used to Know" – 4:08
2. "Money Tree" – 3:13
3. "Joan and Bobby" – 3:38
4. "From Me to You" – 1:48
5. "Somebody That I Used to Know" (video) – 4:25

==== Weekly charts ====
| Chart (2012) | Peak position |
|---|---|
| Austria (Ö3 Austria Top 40) | 30 |
| Belgium (Ultratop 50 Flanders) | 30 |
| Belgium (Ultratop 50 Wallonia) | 28 |
| Canada Hot 100 (Billboard) | 13 |
| Canada AC (Billboard) | 42 |
| Denmark (Tracklisten) | 12 |
| France (SNEP) | 80 |
| Germany (GfK) | 41 |
| Netherlands (Single Top 100) | 9 |
| Sweden (Sverigetopplistan) | 45 |
| Switzerland (Schweizer Hitparade) | 54 |
| UK Singles (Official Charts Company) | 80 |
| US Bubbling Under Hot 100 (Billboard) | 9 |

==== Year-end charts ====
| Chart (2012) | Position |
|---|---|
| Canada (Canadian Hot 100) | 96 |

==== Certifications and sales ====
| Region | Certification | Certified units/sales |
|---|---|---|
| Canada (Music Canada) | Platinum | 80,000^{*} |
^{*} Sales figures based on certification alone.

=== Glee cast version ===
"Somebody That I Used to Know"

Single by Glee cast
- Released: 12 April 2012
- Recorded: 2012
- Genre: Pop
- Length: 4:06
- Label: Columbia
- Songwriters: Wally De Backer; Luiz Bonfá

The song was covered in the Glee episode "Big Brother" and performed by Darren Criss (as Blaine Anderson) and Matt Bomer (as Cooper Anderson). It sold 152,000 digital downloads in its first week of release and debuted on the Digital Songs chart at number 10 and the Hot 100 at number 26.

==== Charts ====
| Chart (2012) | Peak position |
|---|---|
| Canada Hot 100 (Billboard) | 21 |
| UK Singles (Official Charts) | 48 |
| US Billboard Hot 100 | 26 |

=== Mayday Parade version ===
"Somebody That I Used to Know"

Single by Mayday Parade featuring Vic Fuentes

from the album Punk Goes Pop 5
- Released: 16 October 2012
- Recorded: 2012
- Genre: Alternative rock; pop-punk
- Length: 3:24
- Label: Fearless
- Songwriters: Wally De Backer, Luiz Bonfá

Mayday Parade singles chronology
| "When You See My Friends" (2011) | "Somebody That I Used to Know" (2012) | "Ghosts" (2013) |

Alternative rock band Mayday Parade released a cover of this song featuring Pierce the Veil's lead vocalist Vic Fuentes for the fifth edition of the compilation album Punk Goes Pop, which features bands of the punk, alternative, and hardcore genres covering hit pop songs. Their cover reached number 18 on the Billboard US Rock Songs chart. Alternative Press named their version as the fourth best "Top 50 Punk Goes Pop covers of all time" and ranked it at number six on their "10 Best Mayday Parade Songs" list.

==== Charts ====
| Chart (2012) | Peak position |
|---|---|
| UK Rock & Metal (Official Charts) | 32 |
| US Hot Rock & Alternative Songs (Billboard) | 18 |
| US Heatseekers Songs (Billboard) | 19 |

==== Certifications ====
| Region | Certification | Certified units/sales |
|---|---|---|
| United States (RIAA) | Gold | 500,000^{‡} |
^{‡} Sales+streaming figures based on certification alone.

=== Three Days Grace version ===
"Somebody That I Used to Know"

Single by Three Days Grace
- Released: 22 July 2020
- Genre: Hard rock; alternative rock; electronic rock; post-grunge
- Length: 3:29
- Label: RCA
- Songwriters: Wally De Backer; Luiz Bonfá
- Producers: Neil Sanderson; Howard Benson

Three Days Grace singles chronology
| "Right Left Wrong" (2018) | "Somebody That I Used to Know" (2020) | "So Called Life" (2021) |

Music video
- "Somebody That I Used to Know" on YouTube

On 22 July 2020, Canadian rock band Three Days Grace covered the song and released it as a non-album single. The song was later included as a bonus track on the Japanese version of the group's seventh album Explosions. A music video (directed by Mike Filsinger) was also released for this version, which features the band performing in a Sketch-like background. Their cover charted in the rock song charts of Canada and the United States. The song reached number seven on the Billboard Canada Rock chart and number 19 on the US Rock Airplay chart.

Lead vocalist Matt Walst noted about the song, saying: "The first time I heard 'Somebody That I Used to Know' I got goosebumps! This has only happened to me a few times in my life. I remember listening to it over and over and just being happy. Music releases a mood[-]enhancing chemical in the brain that can set good moods and peak enjoyment. Music is truly the best drug!"

The track was produced by drummer Neil Sanderson and Howard Benson. Bassist Brad Walst told Brave Words that Matt Walst sent him a voicemail of him singing the song with an acoustic guitar and Brad thought it would be a good idea to release a cover of it. The group recorded the track separately.

A music video was released on 22 July 2020, and was directed by Mike Filsinger. It was recorded on an iPhone with the band members performing in front of a white tarp and a filter was added on top of it after it was finished.

==== Track listing ====
Digital download
| No. | Title | Length |
|---|---|---|
| 1. | "Somebody That I Used to Know" | 3:29 |

Digital download – EP
| No. | Title | Length |
|---|---|---|
| 1. | "Somebody That I Used to Know" | 3:29 |
| 2. | "Right Left Wrong" | 3:57 |
| 3. | "Infra-Red" | 3:50 |
| 4. | "The Mountain" | 3:21 |

==== Weekly charts ====
| Chart (2020) | Peak position |
|---|---|
| Canada Rock (Billboard) | 7 |
| Czech Republic Rock (IFPI) | 6 |
| Finland (Suomen virallinen lista) | 50 |
| US Rock & Alternative Airplay (Billboard) | 19 |

==== Year-end charts ====
| Chart (2021) | Position |
|---|---|
| US Hot Hard Rock Songs (Billboard) | 43 |
| US Mainstream Rock Songs (Billboard) | 50 |

=== "Somebody (2024)" ===
"Somebody (2024)"

Single by Gotye, Fisher, Chris Lake featuring Kimbra and Sante Sansone
- Released: 9 February 2024
- Length: 2:33
- Label: Island Records
- Songwriters: Wally De Backer, Luiz Bonfá
- Producers: Chris Lake, Fisher, Sante Sansone, Wally De Backer

Music video
- "Somebody (2024)" on YouTube

Electronic music producers, Fisher, Chris Lake, and Sante Sansone reworked the song and released it as "Somebody (2024)" in February 2024. The single track is 2:33 minutes long.

==== Reception ====
At the 2025 ARIA Music Awards, the song was nominated for ARIA Award for Song of the Year.

Hugh McIntyre from Forbes said "It sounds almost exactly the same until about a minute in, when a big beat kicks in, and it becomes clear that something new has been added."

==== Charts ====
Chart performance for "Somebody (2024)"
| Chart (2024) | Peak position |
|---|---|
| Australian Artist (ARIA) | 9 |
| Greece International (IFPI) | 82 |
| Lithuania Airplay (TopHit) | 25 |
| Romania Airplay (TopHit) | 74 |
| US Hot Dance/Electronic Songs (Billboard) | 24 |

Chart performance for "Somebody (2026)"
| Chart (2026) | Peak position |
|---|---|
| Colombia Anglo Airplay (National-Report) | 8 |

==== Certifications ====
Certifications
| Region | Certification | Certified units/sales |
|---|---|---|
| Australia (ARIA) | Platinum | 70,000^{‡} |
| Belgium (BRMA) | Gold | 20,000^{‡} |
| Brazil (Pro-Música Brasil) | 2× Platinum | 80,000^{‡} |
| New Zealand (RMNZ) | Gold | 15,000^{‡} |
| Spain (Promusicae) | Gold | 30,000^{‡} |
^{‡} Sales+streaming figures based on certification alone.

=== Artbat and David Guetta Mix ===
==== Charts ====
===== Weekly charts =====
Weekly chart performance
| Chart (2026) | Peak position |
|---|---|
| France Airplay (SNEP) | 19 |
| Ukraine Airplay (TopHit) | 41 |

===== Monthly charts =====
Monthly chart performance
| Chart (2026) | Peak position |
|---|---|
| Ukraine Airplay (TopHit) | 60 |

=== Others ===
Dutch DJ Tiësto remixed the song for his album Club Life: Volume Two Miami.

The a cappella group Pentatonix covered the song on YouTube video in February 2012, later releasing the track on their EP PTX, Volume 1, on 26 June 2012. "Weird Al" Yankovic recorded a cover as part of his polka medley "NOW That's What I Call Polka!" for his 2014 album Mandatory Fun.

The song has been covered twice on BBC Radio 1's Live Lounge: by Rita Ora in February 2012, then by fun. and Hayley Williams in May 2012. In May 2012, American duo Karmin made a cover of the song on Sirius XM Hitsas did Ray William Johnson through his project, Your Favorite Martian, published on Youtube May 23. "Somebody That I Used to Know" has been covered by many other artists, including Ingrid Michaelson, The Fergies, Benee, Sam Tsui, Right the Stars featuring Karmina, Coheed and Cambria, and Your Favorite Martian.

Phillip Phillips and Elise Testone covered the song while competing on the eleventh season of American Idol on 11 April 2012. and The Voice of Ireland by Andy Mac Unfraidh.

English fingerstyle guitarist Mike Dawes released an arrangement of the song on his debut album What Just Happened? in 2013, garnering praise from Gotye. Jazz pianist Jacky Terrasson included the song in his 2015 album Take This.

Gotye paid tribute to the large number of cover versions of the song by creating a video remix, released in August 2012, using segments from hundreds of online covers to create a new, unique version of the track, titled "Somebodies: A YouTube Orchestra". Gotye states the concept "was directly inspired here by Kutiman's Thru-You project", released in March 2009, which edited numerous YouTube videos to create a new cohesive song.

On 4 March 2025, Doechii officially released her single "Anxiety" to digital streaming platforms after it went viral on TikTok. The song, which prominently samples "Somebody That I Used to Know", was originally recorded for her 2019 self-released mixtape, Coven Music Session, Vol. 1. "Anxiety" was sampled by Sleepy Hallow for his 2023 song of the same name, before Doechii's original demo became popular on TikTok.

== See also ==
- List of Airplay 100 number ones
- List of best-selling singles
- List of best-selling singles in the United States
- List of Billboard Adult Contemporary number ones of 2012 and 2013 (U.S.)
- List of Billboard Adult Top 40 number-one songs of the 2010s
- List of Billboard Alternative Songs number ones of the 2010s
- List of Billboard Dance Club Songs number ones of 2012
- List of Billboard Hot 100 number ones of 2012
- List of Billboard Mainstream Top 40 number-one songs of 2012
- List of Canadian Hot 100 number-one singles of 2012
- List of Dutch Top 40 number-one singles of 2011
- List of highest-certified singles in Australia
- List of million-selling singles in the United Kingdom
- List of number-one dance airplay hits of 2012 (U.S.)
- List of number-one digital songs of 2012 (U.S.)
- List of number-one hits (Denmark)
- List of number-one hits of 2011 (Germany)
- List of number-one hits of 2012 (Austria)
- List of number-one hits of 2012 (France)
- List of number-one hits of 2012 (Italy)
- List of number-one singles from the 2010s (New Zealand)
- List of number-one singles of 2011 (Australia)
- List of number-one singles of 2012 (Finland)
- List of number-one singles of 2012 (Ireland)
- List of number-one singles of 2012 (Poland)
- List of number-one singles of the 2010s (Sweden)
- List of UK singles chart number ones of the 2010s
- List of Ultratop 50 number-one singles of 2011
