= Sing It All Away =

Studio album by Walk off the Earth
- Released: June 16, 2015
- Studio: Noble Street Studios (Toronto, Ontario)
- Length: 42:06
- Label: Columbia

Walk off the Earth chronology
R.E.V.O. (2013)	Sing It All Away (2015)

Singles from Sing It All Away
- 1. "Rule the World" Released: March 31, 2015; 2. "Hold On (The Break)" Released: January 13, 2016

Sing It All Away is the fourth studio album by Canadian band Walk off the Earth, released on June 16, 2015 by Columbia Records. It was preceded by the release of the first single "Rule the World".

== Singles ==
"Rule the World" was released as the first single to promote Sing It All Away. The music video, directed by John Poliquin, was released on March 31, 2015.

== Critical reception ==
Upon release, Sing It All Away has garnered positive reviews from critics. Stephen Thompson of NPR stated that the album's material "fits neatly alongside the music that inspired it, with tiny strands of disparate genres and influences woven in". However, AllMusic's Marcy Donelson gave a mixed review, giving the album three out of five stars. She stated that the album at some points could be "distracting or delightful", but at the same time praised its songwriting for its sophisticated tone.

== Track listing ==
No.	Title	Writer(s)	Length
1.	"Rule the World"	Sarah Blackwood; Ryan Marshall; Giancarlo Nicassio; Thomas "Tawgs" Salter; Dave Bassett; David Kahne	3:24
2.	"I'll Be Waiting"	Blackwood; Nicassio; Salter; Marshall; Tim Bergling	3:46
3.	"Home We'll Go"	Blackwood; Nicassio; Salter; Marshall	3:09
4.	"Hold On (The Break)"	Blackwood; Nicassio; Salter; Marshall; Jerrod Bettis; Jay Duwyn	3:27
5.	"Boomerang"	Blackwood; Nicassio; Marshall; Jarrad K.	3:29
6.	"Sing It All Away"	Blackwood; Nicassio; Salter; Marshall	3:32
7.	"Climb Out Your Window"	Blackwood; Nicassio; Jarrad K.; Marshall; Jim Irvin; Julian Emery	3:02
8.	"California Trees"	Blackwood; Salter; Nicassio; Marshall	3:15
9.	"Alright"	Blackwood; Nicassio; Marshall; Chris DeStefano; Duwyn	3:06
10.	"Heart Is a Weapon"	Blackwood; Nicassio; Marshall; Salter; Jesse Shatkin	3:10
11.	"We Got Love"	Blackwood; Nicassio; Marshall; Drew Pearson	3:39
12.	"Home We'll Go (Take My Hand)" (with Steve Aoki)	Steve Aoki; Nicassio; Blackwood; Marshall; Salter	5:07

== Charts ==
Chart (2015–16)	Peak position
Australian Albums (ARIA)	96
Belgian Albums (Ultratop Flanders)	162
Belgian Albums (Ultratop Wallonia)	195
Canadian Albums (Billboard)	2
Dutch Albums (Album Top 100)	79
Scottish Albums (OCC)	86
Swiss Albums (Schweizer Hitparade)	74
UK Albums (OCC)	98
US Billboard 200	71
US Top Alternative Albums (Billboard)	14
