= R.E.V.O. (EP) =

R.E.V.O. EP

EP by Walk off the Earth
- Released: 30 October 2012
- Recorded: 2011–2012 at B-Town Sound, Burlington, Ontario
- Genre: Indie, alternative
- Length: 13:03
- Label: Columbia Records
- Producer: Gianni Nicassio, Tawgs Salter

Walk off the Earth chronology
| My Rock (2010) | R.E.V.O. EP (2012) | R.E.V.O. (2013) |

R.E.V.O. is an EP by Canadian indie band Walk off the Earth. It was released on 30 October 2012, through Columbia Records. It was given a rating of four by PopMatters.

== Track list ==
| No. | Title | Length |
|---|---|---|
| 1. | "Red Hands" | 3:01 |
| 2. | "Gang of Rhythm" | 3:35 |
| 3. | "Speeches" | 3:20 |
| 4. | "Summer Vibe" | 3:07 |
| Total length: | | 13:03 |

== Personnel ==
Walk off the Earth

- Gianni Luminati
- Ryan Marshall
- Mike Taylor
- Joel Cassady
- Sarah Blackwood

Production

- Production, engineering, mixing and mastering by Gianni Luminati and Tawgs Salter
