= Sell Your Soul =

Studio album by The Creepshow
- Released: May 30, 2006
- Genre: Psychobilly
- Length: 38:36
- Label: Stereo Dynamite
- Producer: The Creepshow and Steve Rizun

The Creepshow chronology
Sell Your Soul (2006)	Run For Your Life (2008)

Professional ratings
Review scores
Source	Rating
Chartattack	not rated

Sell Your Soul is the first full-length album from Burlington, Ontario's The Creepshow. The album was released by Stereo Dynamite and distributed by EMI Music Canada.

The album features eleven tracks, ten of which are original songs. The first track, "The Sermon" is a spoken word introduction by organ player The Reverend McGinty in a Vincent Price-inspired voice.

Music videos were released for both "Zombies Ate Her Brain" and "The Garden."

== Tracks ==
1. "The Sermon" (0:33)
2. "Creatures of the Night" (2:42)
3. "Shake" (3:38)
4. "Sell Your Soul" (2:41)
5. "Cherry Hill" (2:57)
6. "Candy Kiss" (3:48)
7. "Grave Diggers" (2:03)
8. "Zombies Ate Her Brain" (1:29)
9. "The Garden" (3:36)
10. "Doghouse" (4:37)
11. "Psycho Ball & Chain" (2:48)

== Band members ==
- Sean "Sickboy" McNab - Upright Bass / Backup Vocals
- Jen "Hellcat" Blackwood - Guitar / Lead Vocals
- Paul "The Reverend" McGinty - Keys / Backup Vocals
- Matt "Pomade" Gee - drums

== Other Contributors ==
- Steve Rizun - Producer, Recording, Mixing and Mastering.
- Orchard Studios - Drum and Bass Recording.
- Doghouse Music, Lyrics and additional Guitar by Hooch of The Matadors.
- Harmonica on The Garden by Sarah Blackwood.
- All Background Vocals by The Creepshow and SnaX Rebo.
- Design and Photography by Ashlea Wessel at Revolver Photography.
- Illustrations by Jen "Hellcat" Blackwood.
- Psycho Ball and Chain lyric inspiration by Emma
