= Walk off the Earth =

Canadian indie pop band

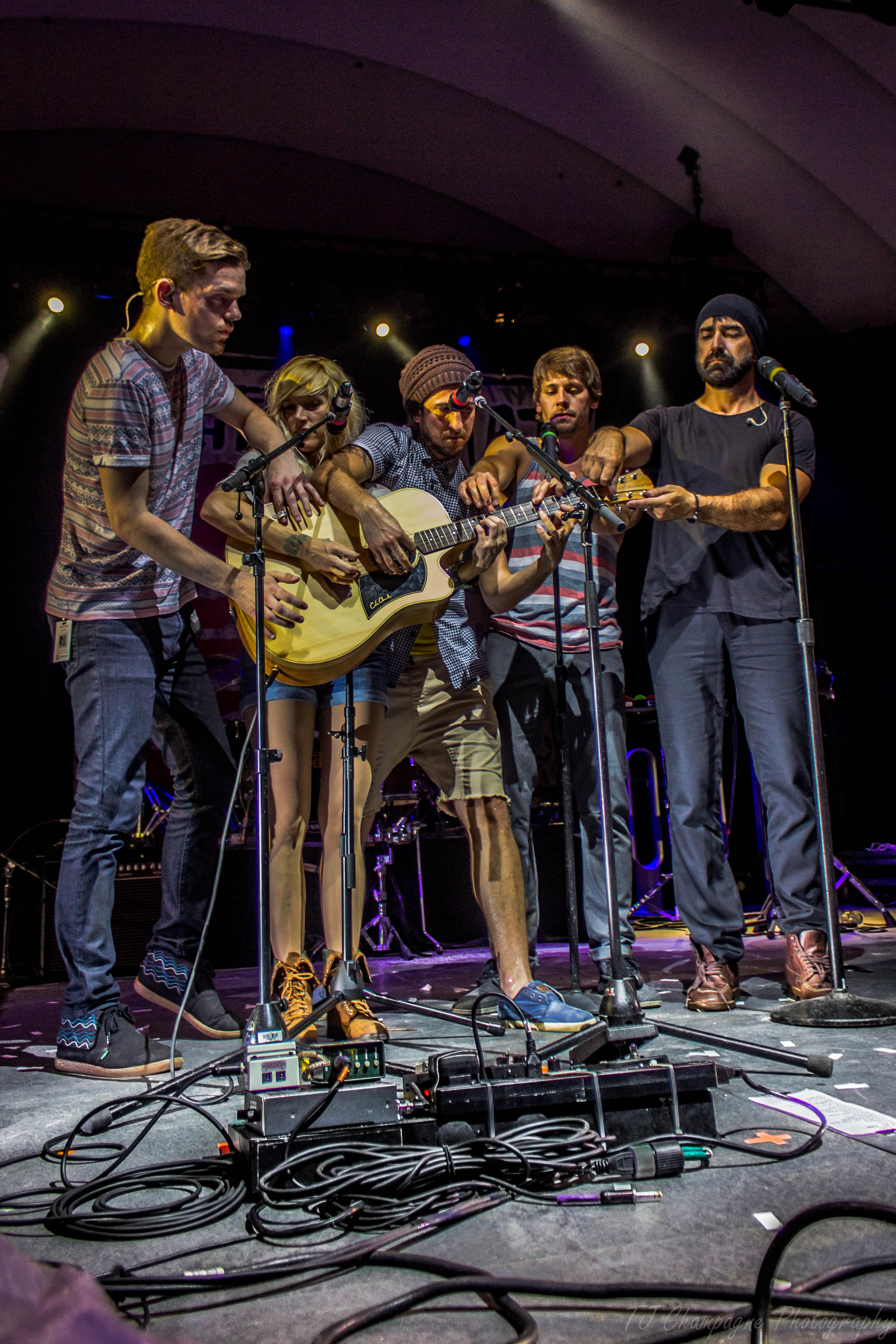
- Walk off the Earth performing in Toronto at the Canadian National Exhibition 2013

Background information
- Origin: Burlington, Ontario, Canada
- Genres: Pop rock; indie pop
- Years active: 2006–present
- Labels: The Orchard; Golden Carrot; Columbia; SlapDash
- Members: Gianni "Luminati" Nicassio; Joel Cassady; Sarah Blackwood; David "Tokyo" Speirs
- Past members: Peter Kirkwood; Mike "Beard Guy" Taylor; Ryan Marshall
- Website: walkofftheearth.com

Walk off the Earth is a Canadian indie pop band from Burlington, Ontario. The group is known for its music videos of covers and originals. The band is well known for covering pop-genre music on YouTube, making use of instruments such as the ukulele and the theremin, as well as looping samples. The band's recorded music and videos are produced by member and multi-instrumentalist Gianni "Luminati" Nicassio.

== History ==
Walk off the Earth was formed in 2006 in Burlington, Ontario, Canada. The band began releasing music independently and created a variety of cover versions of songs including The Gregory Brothers. In early 2012, the band's live cover of Gotye's "Somebody That I Used to Know" on YouTube gathered over 175 million views in a mere four months, receiving positive reviews from both Gotye and his co-singer on the song, Kimbra. The band released an accompanying video in which all five members are shown playing on the same guitar simultaneously. The production was taken from the 26th cut of a 14-hour session. Ellen DeGeneres featured the band on her January 23, 2012, show where they played live, again on one guitar; the group was also included in YouTube Rewind 2012 "Rewind YouTube Style 2012", doing a part of its one-guitar acoustic version of "Gangnam Style".

In February 2012, the band signed a recording contract with Columbia Records. The members appeared in the Season 4 premiere of CTV's The Listener, performing two songs and socializing with the main characters in the bar. They also covered "Rude" by Magic!, "Hello" by Adele, "Party Rock Anthem" by LMFAO, "Payphone" by Maroon 5, and "Roll Up" by Wiz Khalifa.

At this time, singer Sarah Blackwood, who had joined the band in late 2011, was also the singer and guitarist for fellow Ontario based band The Creepshow. The Creepshow had announced a tour of Europe and North America for the late summer - including dates in the United Kingdom in August. However, Walk Off The Earth soon announced a tour of their own with conflicting dates, and on July 16, Blackwood uploaded a farewell video to her YouTube page, announcing she was leaving The Creepshow. Blackwood went on to join Walk Off The Earth on a permanent basis, starting with their Autumn tour and EP, R.E.V.O..

In December 2012, Walk off the Earth released an original single titled "Gang of Rhythm". The group uploaded a cover of Taylor Swift's "I Knew You Were Trouble" to YouTube in January 2013, with four of the five band members and guest beatboxer KRNFX using only vocals.

On March 11, 2013, Rolling Stone streamed their unreleased R.E.V.O. album in its entirety. The full-length R.E.V.O. album was released on March 19, 2013, after which they commenced in the R.E.V.O. Tour through the US and Europe. They began another US and Europe tour, Gang of Rhythm, in 2014. The most recent tour was the Sing It All Away tour through Europe and North America, which began in 2015. The band's YouTube video of Lorde's "Royals" was featured in the 2014 Grammy Awards. The band's original single "Gang of Rhythm" was chosen as the theme song for the Catalan TV show El Foraster. The group was also featured on the soundtrack of the 2015 animated film Snowtime!, performing the song "You're My Sweater". Walk off the Earth won a 2016 Juno award for Group of the Year.

The band's video of "Issues" was filmed with The Next Step dancers Briar Nolet and Myles Erlick, and was featured in Dance Spirit magazine. In August 2017, the band's single "Fire in My Soul" was certified gold. Walk off the Earth performed during the half-time show of the NFL playoff game, January 14, 2018, Minnesota Vikings vs. New Orleans Saints.

On December 30, 2018, it was announced that band member Mike "Beard Guy" Taylor had died from natural causes. He was 51 years old. Walk Off the Earth subsequently cancelled their scheduled performance at the Niagara Falls New Year's Eve Canadian Broadcasting Corporation television special, a performance that was to open their 2019 world tour. On January 7, 2019, the group announced a free memorial and tribute concert for Taylor. Presented by the city of Burlington and the Sound of Music Festival, family, friends and fans came together to celebrate Taylor's life and legacy on January 13 at Civic Square in Downtown Burlington. Special guests such as Scott Helman, members of Barenaked Ladies and more performed at the event, which was live-streamed by CBC Music. On January 16, 2019, the band announced it would be continuing on its 2019 tour. In a video posted to their social media pages, the four members thanked their family, friends, and fans, stating that their tour would be devoted to honoring Taylor's memory. Walk off the Earth sang "O Canada" at game 4 of the 2019 NBA Finals in Oakland, where the Toronto Raptors played the Golden State Warriors.

In December 2019, Ryan Marshall announced on Twitter and Instagram that he was going to be leaving the band.

In April 2020, Deadline announced that the band wrote and performed the theme song, "The Journey Starts Today", for the English dub of Pokémon Journeys: The Series. In November 2020, they collaborated with Canadian country singer Brett Kissel on "A Few Good Stories".

On June 9, 2021, Walk Off the Earth released "Love You Right" as the lead single from their upcoming sixth studio album. "Love You Right" would mark their first collaboration with Grammy nominated Danish group Lukas Graham. The single received over a million streams in less than a week. The accompanying music video was directed by Chris Di Staulo.

The band released their sixth studio album, Meet You There, across all digital music platforms on July 22, 2021.

On August 9, 2021, Walk Off the Earth partnered with Amazon Music for a performance from atop Toronto's CN Tower to be live-streamed on Amazon's Twitch channel. The live stream event was the first performance of the band's newly released sixth studio album.

On September 24, 2021, the band released their first original 7-track children's album, Romeo Eats Vol. 1 via Golden Carrot Records/The Orchard. The album arrived alongside the group's children's companion web series, "Romeo Eats," a food discovery show hosted by Walk Off the Earth lead singer Gianni Luminati and his 3-year-old son Romeo. Each "Romeo Eats" episode shows Romeo trying new foods, and includes an original song produced by Walk Off the Earth that features the explored food in question. The songs were subsequently released on album as Walk Off the Earth & Romeo Eats, Vol. 1; the album's Juno Award nomination for Children's Album of the Year at the Juno Awards of 2022 made Romeo the youngest Juno nominee in the entire history of the awards.

On March 18, 2022, Walk off the Earth recruited D Smoke, who had appeared in Netflix's Rhythm + Flow, for their anthem, “Bet On Me”.

On July 8, 2022, Walk off the Earth returned with the release of their latest single, "Back in Bed".

== Band members ==
=== Current ===
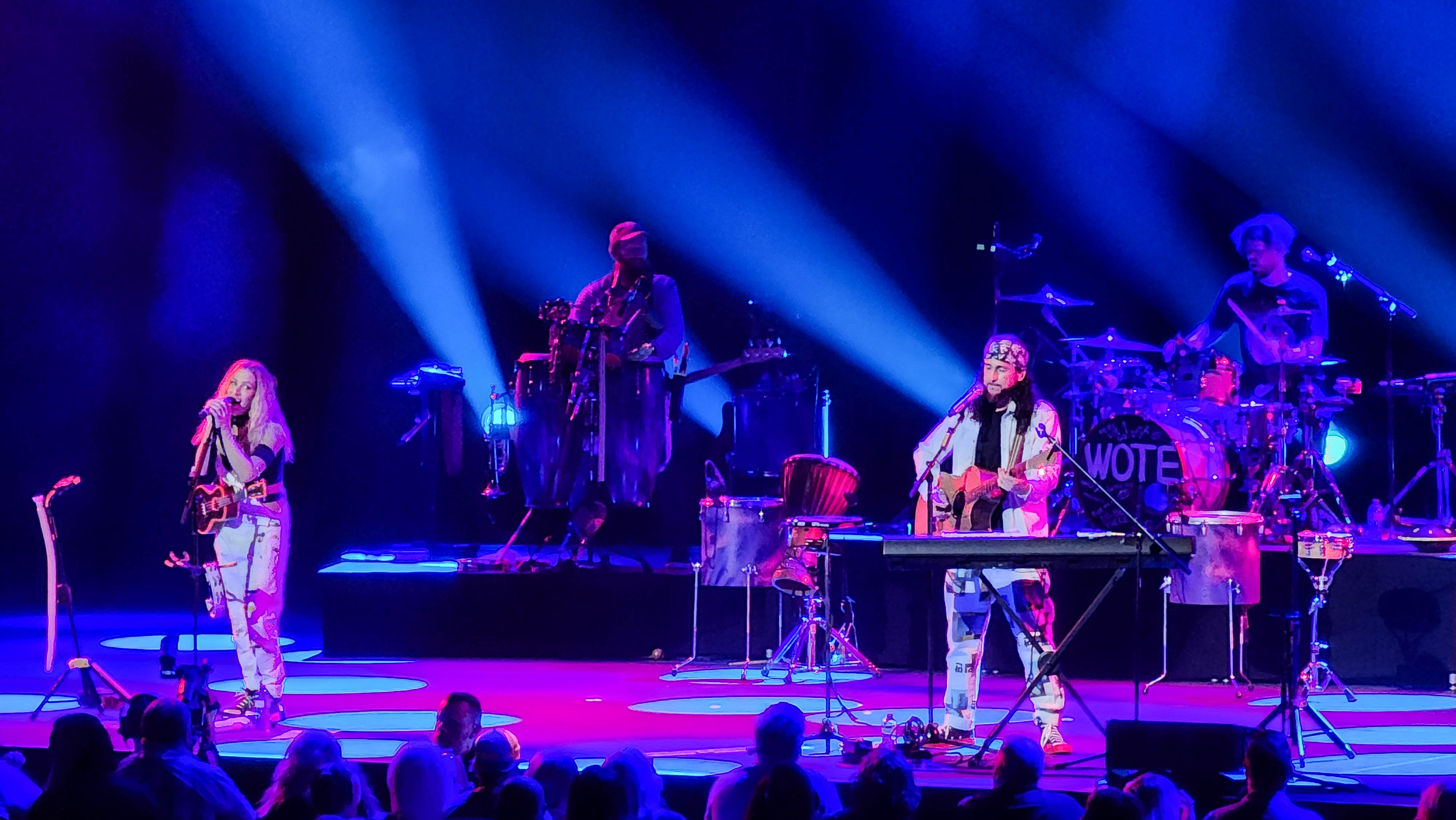
Walk off the Earth in 2023; left to right, Sarah Blackwood, David Speirs, Gianni Nicassio, and Joel Cassady

- Gianni "Luminati" Nicassio – vocals, bass, guitar, ukulele, drums, percussion, banjo, mandolin, cello, glockenspiel, kalimba, harmonica, keyboards, double bass (2006–present)
- Joel Cassady – drums, percussion, vocals, ukulele, keyboards, guitar, bass, kalimba, sampler (2011–present)
- Sarah Blackwood – vocals, ukulele, guitar, percussion, glockenspiel, keyboards, bass, mandolin (2011–present)
- David "Tokyo" Speirs – percussion, trumpet, flute, drums, bass, guitar, keyboards (touring musician 2016–2020, full band member 2020–present)

=== Touring ===
- Adam Michael – guitar, keyboards, bass (2016–2023)
- Lee Williamson – guitar, banjo, bass, mandolin, ukulele
- Zach Gerber – drums, guitar, bass, vocals, percussion

=== Former ===
- Ryan Marshall – vocals, guitar, bass, harmonica, trumpet, ukulele, percussion, keyboards (2006–2019)
- Pete Kirkwood – drums, vocals, percussion (2006–2010)
- Mike "Beard Guy" Taylor – piano, organ, keyboards, trumpet, euphonium, kazoo, accordion, melodica, didgeridoo, glockenspiel, percussion, vocals, (2010–2018; his death)

== Discography ==
=== Studio albums ===
Title	Album details	Peak chart positions								Certifications	Sales
Title	Album details	CAN	AUS	AUT	NLD	SWI	UK	US	US Alt.	Certifications	Sales
Smooth Like Stone on a Beach	Released: December 31, 2007; Label: Slapdash	—	—	—	—	—	—	—	—		
My Rock	Released: July 30, 2010; Label: Slapdash	—	—	—	—	—	—	—	—		
Vol. 1	Released: November 20, 2012; Label: Slapdash	—	—	—	—	—	—	—	—		
Vol. 2	Released: November 20, 2012; Label: Slapdash	—	—	—	—	—	—	—	—		
R.E.V.O.	Released: March 19, 2013; Label: Columbia	7	—	29	—	—	—	90	19	MC: Gold	US: 51,000
Sing It All Away	Released: June 16, 2015; Label: Columbia	2	96	—	79	74	98	71	14		CAN: 5,400
Here We Go!	Released: October 25, 2019; Label: Golden Carrot	11	—	—	—	—	—	44	—		
Meet You There	Released: July 23, 2021; Label: Golden Carrot	—	—	—	—	—	—	—	—		
Romeo Eats Vol. 1	Released: September 24, 2021; Label: Golden Carrot/The Orchard	—	—	—	—	—	—	—	—		
Romeo Eats Vol. 2	Released: February 25, 2022; Label: Golden Carrot/The Orchard	—	—	—	—	—	—	—	—		
Stand by You	Released: August 18, 2023; Label: Golden Carrot/The Orchard	—	—	—	—	—	—	—	—		
Good Company	Released: November 7, 2025; Label: Golden Carrot/The Orchard	—	—	—	—	—	—	—	—		
"—" denotes an album that did not chart or was not released in that territory.

=== Extended plays ===
Title	EP details	Peak chart positions
Title	EP details	CAN
R.E.V.O.	Released: October 30, 2012; Label: Columbia	—
iTunes Session	Released: November 22, 2013; Label: Columbia	—
A Walk off the Earth Christmas EP	Released: December 2, 2014; Label: Columbia	—
Sing It All Away	Released: 2015; Label: Columbia	—
Beard Ballads, Vol. 1	Released: April 14, 2017; Label: Walk off the Earth	—
Taekwondo (Original Motion Picture Soundtrack)	Released: September 18, 2017; Label: Walk off the Earth / Universal	—
Holiday Beard Ballads, Vol. 1	Released: November 16, 2017; Label: Walk off the Earth	—
Subscribe to the Holidays	Released: November 9, 2018; Label: Walk Off the Earth	20
A Christmas Album	Released: November 9, 2023; Label: Walk off the Earth	—

=== Singles ===
==== As lead artist ====
List of singles, with selected chart positions and certifications, showing year released and album name
Title	Year	Peak chart positions										Certifications	Album
Title	Year	CAN	AUS	BEL (Fl)	FRA	GER	NLD	SWE	SWI	UK	US Bub.	Certifications	Album
"Somebody That I Used to Know"	2012	13	—	30	80	41	9	45	54	80	9	MC: Platinum	R.E.V.O.
"Red Hands"	2012	9	59	—	—	—	—	—	—	—	14	MC: 2× Platinum	R.E.V.O.
"Gang of Rhythm"	2013	60	—	—	—	—	—	—	—	—	—		R.E.V.O.
"Shake"	2014	69	—	—	—	—	—	—	—	—	—		R.E.V.O.
"Rule the World"	2015	22	—	—	—	—	—	—	—	—	—	MC: Platinum	Sing It All Away
"Home We'll Go (Take My Hand)" (with Steve Aoki)	2015	62	—	—	—	—	—	—	—	—	—		Neon Future II
"Hold On (The Break)"	2016	66	—	—	—	—	—	—	—	—	—		Sing It All Away
"Fire in My Soul"	2016	77	—	—	—	—	—	—	—	—	—	MC: Gold	Beard Ballads, Vol. 1
"Taekwondo"	2017	—	—	—	—	—	—	—	—	—	—		Taekwondo (Original Motion Picture Soundtrack)
"Nomad"	2017	—	—	—	—	—	—	—	—	—	—		Non-album singles
"Fifth Avenue"	2018	—	—	—	—	—	—	—	—	—	—		Non-album singles
"Mike's Song"	2019	—	—	—	—	—	—	—	—	—	—		Here We Go!
"I'll Be There"	2019	94	—	—	—	—	—	—	—	—	—	MC: Platinum	Here We Go!
"Savage Love"	2020	—	—	—	—	—	—	—	—	—	—		Non-album single
"This Is Love"	2020	—	—	—	—	—	—	—	—	—	—		Meet You There
"How It Is"	2021	—	—	—	—	—	—	—	—	—	—		Meet You There
"Anthem"	2021	—	—	—	—	—	—	—	—	—	—		Meet You There
"Love You Right" (featuring Lukas Graham)	2021	—	—	—	—	—	—	—	—	—	—		Meet You There
"Hold on to Your Love" (featuring Phillip Phillips)	2021	—	—	—	—	—	—	—	—	—	—		Stand by You
"Bet on Me" (featuring D Smoke)	2022	—	—	—	—	—	—	—	—	—	—		Stand by You
"Back in Bed"	2022	—	—	—	—	—	—	—	—	—	—		Stand by You
"Happy Stuff"	2022	—	—	—	—	—	—	—	—	—	—		Stand by You
"Tomorrow Can Wait" (with Tenille Townes)	2022	—	—	—	—	—	—	—	—	—	—		Stand by You
"My Stupid Heart"	2023	92	—	—	—	—	—	—	—	—	—	MC: Platinum	Stand by You
"Whatever"	2023	—	—	—	—	—	—	—	—	—	—		Stand by You
"Long Way Home" (with Lindsey Stirling)	2023	—	—	—	—	—	—	—	—	—	—		Stand by You
"Caught Me at My Lowest (Casey Lowry and Walk off the Earth)	2023	—	—	—	—	—	—	—	—	—	—		Non-album singles
"Y.M.C.A."	2023	—	—	—	—	—	—	—	—	—	—		Non-album singles
"—" denotes releases that did not chart

==== As featured artist ====
List of singles, showing year released and album name
Title	Year	Album
"Paradise" (Nicky Romero and Deniz Koyu featuring Walk off the Earth)	2018	Non-album singles
"High Hopes" (Gabriela Bee featuring Walk off the Earth)	2019	Non-album singles

== Awards and nominations ==
Year	Award ceremony	Award	Result
2013	Juno Awards	Breakthrough Group of the Year	Nominated
2013	Juno Awards	Video of the Year — Little Boxes	Nominated
2013	CASBY Awards	Molson Canadian Favourite New Artist	Won
2013	YouTube Music Awards	Response of the Year	Nominated
2014	Juno Awards	Group of the Year	Nominated
2014	Juno Awards	Pop Album of the Year — R.E.V.O.	Nominated
2014	Juno Awards	Juno Fan Choice Award	Nominated
2014	Canadian Radio Music Awards	Best New Group or Solo Artist: Mainstream AC	Nominated
2014	Canadian Radio Music Awards	Best New Group or Solo Artist: Hot AC	Won
2014	Canadian Radio Music Awards	Best New Group or Solo Artist: CHR	Won
2014	Canadian Radio Music Awards	SOCAN Song of the Year — Red Hands	Won
2014	Canadian Radio Music Awards	Fans' Choice	Won
2016	Juno Awards	Juno Fan Choice Award	Nominated
2016	Juno Awards	Pop Album of the Year — Sing It All Away	Nominated
2016	Juno Awards	Group of the Year	Won
2018	Streamy Awards	Cover Songs — Girls Like You	Won
2020	Juno Awards	Group of the Year	Nominated
2020	Juno Awards	Pop Album of the Year — HERE WE GO!	Nominated
2022	Juno Awards	Juno Award for Children's Album of the Year — Romeo Eats Vol. 1	Nominated
2023	Juno Awards	Juno Award for Children's Album of the Year — Romeo Eats Vol. 2	Won
