= Outsider (Three Days Grace album) =

Studio album by Three Days Grace
- Released: March 9, 2018
- Recorded: July 2017–January 2018
- Genre: Post-grunge; hard rock; alternative metal
- Length: 39:20
- Label: RCA
- Producer: Gavin Brown; Howard Benson; Three Days Grace

Three Days Grace chronology
Human (2015)	Outsider (2018)	Explosions (2022)

Singles from Outsider
- 1. "The Mountain" Released: January 25, 2018; 2. "Infra-Red" Released: June 25, 2018; 3. "Right Left Wrong" Released: November 12, 2018

Outsider is the sixth studio album by the Canadian rock band Three Days Grace. It was released on March 9, 2018 through RCA Records. The album was produced by two of the band's prior producers, Gavin Brown and Howard Benson but also by members of the band themselves. It is the second album to feature Matt Walst as lead vocalist.

The album debuted on the Billboard 200 at number 24 and sold 17,000 copies in the US in its first week. The album also peaked at number nine on the Canadian Albums Chart.

== Background and recording ==
Once the tour for their 2015 album Human concluded, the band decided to take time off to work on the next album "in as much isolation as possible," according to drummer Neil Sanderson. The band desired, Sanderson explained, to "get a break and find the space to create." To accomplish this, the group spent a year writing at rural properties owned by Sanderson and bassist Brad Walst. The first song they wrote was the album's lead single, "The Mountain". According to Brad Walst, the group wrote and recorded around 20 songs, selecting the album tracks by "vibe" in order for the album to have "a good sequence to it."

Talking about the themes found on the album, Sanderson said "I think there's a common thread that talks about how to navigate your way through modern life and being bombarded by information and feelings and beliefs. We don't have all the answers here, but we definitely do bring up the topic a lot." He also revealed that lead vocalist Matt Walst was much more involved in the songwriting, messages, and concepts than on Human, which was Matt's first since joining the band in 2013. Brad Walst also stated that the album is about "the journey to find your place." The background electronic aspects of the album were influenced by Bring Me the Horizon's 2015 album That's the Spirit.

The band embarked on a headlining tour called, The Outsider tour in 2018. The group also supported Avenged Sevenfold and Prophets of Rage on the End of the World tour that same year.

== Singles ==
The band released the first single with two promotional tracks to back the album's release. "The Mountain" was released as the lead single on January 25, 2018 and was accompanied by a music video. The song peaked at number one on the US Mainstream Rock chart. "I Am an Outsider" was released on February 16, 2018 as a promotional single from the album. "Right Left Wrong" was released as the third and final song to promote the album on March 2, 2018. On June 12, "Infra-Red" was released as the band's second single from the album. The song topped the US Mainstream Rock chart. On November 13, 2018, the band released the album's opening track, "Right Left Wrong", as the third single for radio airplay. The song reached number one on the US Mainstream Rock chart.

== Critical reception ==
Professional ratings
Review scores
Source	Rating
Distorted Sound	8/10 stars
Melodic	3/5 stars
Salute	3/5 stars
Sputnikmusic	2/5
Ultimate Guitar	5/10

Outsider was met with mixed reviews. Jack Press of Distorted Sound praised the opening track "Right Left Wrong" for Walst's, "defining performance... similar to Gontier's mid-noughties range as much as they sound undeniably fresh." He also complimented the songs "I Am an Outsider" and "Infra-Red" for its "arena-driven chorus" that blur the lines between alternative rock and pop rock. However, he criticized the track "Love Me or Leave Me" for its repetitiveness. He concluded, "It's what sets this record apart from other alt-rock outfits right now, whereas much of their peers are focusing on feel-good party anthems, Three Days Grace give us a masterclass in coming to terms with the well of emotions that lay inside of us."

Kaj Roth of Melodic gave a mixed review of the album stating, "Outsider sounds pretty much like a typical Three Days Grace album but it's just not as great as Human or their early stuff, it's well produced and they show no signs of selling out but most of these songs won't make it onto a best of with this band." Joshua Leep of Salute also gave a mixed review of the album remarking, "teens and young adults will definitely be able to grasp pretty quickly. Older folks might not be able to relate to the lyrical content quite as much, but there are of course always exceptions. Regardless, it is a solid effort with some honest, unhindered, and unhinged music." Simon K of Sputnikmusic praised the tracks, "Villain I'm Not", "Right Left Wrong" and "The Mountain" for its "infectious chorus." However, he criticized the lack of change in their sound, but complimented the "tight rhythm of 'Strange Days' or sombre synth saturation of 'Love Me or Leave Me'." He ended off remarking, "Outsider lacks is that one track to grab onto; there's nothing standout here, nothing that will justify you coming back for a second helping."

== Awards and nominations ==
The band won the Rock Songwriters of the Year award for "The Mountain" on the 30th anniversary of the SOCAN Awards and Rock Artist of the Year on 2019 iHeartRadio Music Awards. Outsider was nominated for Album of the Year and Rock Album of the Year at the 2019 Juno Awards.

Awards and nominations for Outsider
Year	Organization	Award	Result	Ref(s)
2019	Juno Awards	Album of the Year	Nominated	
2019	Juno Awards	Rock Album of the Year	Nominated	

== Track listing ==
All tracks are written by Three Days Grace (Neil Sanderson, Barry Stock, Brad Walst and Matt Walst) and producer Gavin Brown, with additional writers as listed below.

No.	Title	Writer(s)	Length
1.	"Right Left Wrong"		3:56
2.	"The Mountain"	Johnny Andrews	3:18
3.	"I Am an Outsider"	Andrews, Meghan Patrick	2:42
4.	"Infra-Red"	Isaiah Steinberg, Casey Marshall, Dan Kanter	3:50
5.	"Nothing to Lose but You"	Andrews	2:52
6.	"Me Against You"	Ted Bruner	3:29
7.	"Love Me or Leave Me"		3:04
8.	"Strange Days"	Andrews	3:10
9.	"Villain I'm Not"	Andrews	2:55
10.	"Chasing the First Time"	Andrews	2:55
11.	"The New Real"	Marshall	3:00
12.	"The Abyss"	Bruner	4:09
Total length:			39:20

== Personnel ==
Credits retrieved from album's liner notes.

Three Days Grace

- Matt Walst – lead vocals, rhythm guitar
- Barry Stock – lead guitar
- Brad Walst – bass guitar
- Neil Sanderson – drums, backing vocals, piano, programming

Additional musicians

- Rhys Fulber – additional programming

Production

- Gavin Brown – producer
- Howard Benson – producer
- Three Days Grace – producer
- Mike Plotnikoff – engineer
- Chris Lord-Alge – mixing
- Ted Jensen – mastering at Sterling Sound, New York City
- Jill Zimmermann – engineer
- Darren Magierowski – engineer
- Paul Decarli – editing

== Charts ==
Chart performance for Outsider
Chart (2018)	Peak position
Australian Albums (ARIA)	49
Austrian Albums (Ö3 Austria)	28
Belgian Albums (Ultratop Flanders)	182
Canadian Albums (Billboard)	9
Dutch Albums (Album Top 100)	157
German Albums (Offizielle Top 100)	36
New Zealand Heatseeker Albums (RMNZ)	10
Scottish Albums (Official Charts)	96
Swiss Albums (Schweizer Hitparade)	38
UK Album Sales (OCC)	76
UK Digital Albums (OCC)	36
UK Rock & Metal Albums (Official Charts)	10
US Billboard 200	24
US Top Album Sales (Billboard)	7
US Top Alternative Albums (Billboard)	3
US Top Rock Albums (Billboard)	6
US Top Hard Rock Albums (Billboard)	3

== Release history ==
Release history and formats for Outsider
Region	Date	Format	Label	Ref.
Various	March 9, 2018	CD; digital download; LP	RCA	
United Kingdom	March 9, 2018	Vinyl	RCA	
Japan	May 23, 2018	CD	Sony Music Japan	
