= Smooth Like Stone on a Beach =

Studio album by Walk off the Earth
- Released: December 31, 2007
- Recorded: 2006–2007 at B-Town Sound, Burlington, Ontario
- Genres: Reggae, alternative
- Length: 40:53
- Label: SlapDash Records
- Producer: Gianni Luminati

Walk off the Earth chronology
Smooth Like Stone on a Beach (2007)	My Rock (2010)

Smooth Like Stone on a Beach is the debut album by Canadian band Walk off the Earth, released on December 31, 2007 through SlapDash Records.

== Track list ==
No.	Title	Length
1.	"Little Sin"	3:13
2.	"100 Proof Life"	3:56
3.	"Rock Me Away"	2:41
4.	"Gotta Go"	3:27
5.	"My Mistakes"	3:10
6.	"Broke"	4:01
7.	"Miss Jeppetto"	3:58
8.	"Spiraling Son"	3:39
9.	"Stolen"	3:19
10.	"People of the Sun" (Rage Against the Machine cover)	2:01
11.	"Smooth Like Stone on a Beach" (featuring Jeremy Chambers)	3:45
12.	"W.O.T.E."	3:42
Total length:		40:53

== Personnel ==
Walk Off the Earth

- Gianni Luminati – bass guitar, lead vocals on tracks 4 & 11
- Ryan Marshall – guitar, lead vocals on all tracks except 4 & 11
- Pete Kirkwood – drums

Production

- Production, engineering, mixing and mastering by Gianni Luminati
