= Dan Kanter =

- Birth name: Daniel Joseph Kanter
- Born: June 10, 1981 (age 44); Ottawa, Ontario, Canada
- Origin: Toronto, Ontario, Canada
- Occupation(s): Producer, songwriter, musical director, musician
- Instrument(s): Guitar, piano, keyboard, drums, bass, harmonica
- Years active: 2000–present
- Website: twitter.com/dankanter

Daniel Joseph Kanter (born June 10, 1981) is a Canadian multi-instrumentalist, musical director, performance coach, and multi-platinum-selling songwriter/producer from Toronto, Ontario. He is the musical director and former lead guitarist for Justin Bieber. Kanter has written and produced numerous songs and albums – most notably co-writing and co-producing the song "Be Alright" on Bieber's album Believe, and co-producing Bieber's albums My Worlds Acoustic and Believe Acoustic. Kanter has also directed and performed with Stevie Wonder, Carlos Santana, Miley Cyrus, Shawn Mendes, Drake, Bob Weir, Ariana Grande, Logic, Usher, Julia Michaels, Keith Urban, and Mike Gordon and Jon Fishman of Phish. He was a judge on the YTV singing competition TV show The Next Star and the CBC music competition TV show Searchlight. He is the host of the CBC show Guitars In Hand with Dan Kanter.

== Early years ==
Kanter was born in Ottawa, Ontario. At a young age, Kanter learned piano, drums, and guitar. When he was 13, he co-starred on the television show Leaps And Bounds. Kanter began playing clubs with his band Hubris in his hometown of Ottawa, Ontario, at the young age of 14. While attending Sir Robert Borden High School, Kanter co-wrote a full-length musical titled "Destiny: The Musical" which was performed at the school. Kanter headed to Toronto to study classical composition and analysis at York University. While at York University, Kanter played bass in local Toronto funk band Avenue Road. He graduated in 2007 from York University with a Bachelor of Fine Arts in music, and then under the supervision of Rob Bowman, specialized in the works of Bob Dylan at York University's Graduate school.

== Career ==
=== Work with Justin Bieber ===
In 2010, Kanter co-produced Bieber's album My Worlds Acoustic. In 2011, Kanter starred in the 3-D concert film Justin Bieber: Never Say Never. As of 2019, the film's gross holds the record for the most successful concert film of all time and the third most successful documentary of all time. Kanter also co-wrote and produced the song "Be Alright" on Bieber's albums Believe (2012) and Believe Acoustic (2013). In 2013 Kanter was featured in the biographical concert film Justin Bieber's Believe. Kanter co-produced and performed on "What Do You Mean?" (Acoustic) on Bieber's album "Purpose" (bonus track). Kanter co-produced and co-wrote the Poo Bear, Justin Bieber, and Jay Electronica song "Hard To Face Reality" on Poo Bear's 2018 album "Poo Bear Presents: Bearthday Music".

=== Other accomplishments ===
Kanter was a judge on the hit YTV singing competition TV show "The Next Star". He has performed on two episodes of Saturday Night Live. Kanter co-wrote the song "ABC" on Cody Simpson's album Free. Kanter directed Logic, Khalid, and Alessia Cara's powerful performances of 1-800-273-8255 at the 2017 MTV Video Music Awards and 60th Annual Grammy Awards. In 2017, he was a judge on the CBC music competition TV show "Searchlight". Kanter is the host of the CBC show "Guitars In Hand with Dan Kanter". Dan co-wrote the hit song Infra-Red on Three Days Grace's 2018 album Outsider. "Infra-Red" went to number one on the U.S. Billboard Mainstream Rock. In Spring 2020 Dan co-produced and appeared with Justin Bieber, Bryan Adams, Geddy Lee, Avril Lavigne, Michael Buble, Sarah McLachlan, and other notable Canadians, in the all-Canadian ensemble cover of Lean On Me, which raised money for the Canadian Red Cross's COVID-19 initiative. The music video premiered during the 90-minute Canadian benefit concert Stronger Together, Tous Ensemble. In the summer of 2020, Kanter was involved with Alessia Cara's album This Summer: Live Off The Floor.

== Influences ==
Kanter grew up in a musical family. His father – an avid Bob Dylan fan – directed Canadian productions of musicals including The Who's Tommy, Les Misérables, Chicago and Little Shop Of Horrors. Kanter cites Michael Jackson, The Beatles, Bob Dylan, Elton John and Metallica as his biggest influences. He is a fan of grunge era bands, including Nirvana, Pearl Jam, and the Smashing Pumpkins. Kanter's guitar influences include Jimi Hendrix, Zakk Wylde, Stevie Ray Vaughan, David Gilmour of Pink Floyd, and Trey Anastasio of Phish.

== Personal life ==
In October 2010, Kanter married Fashion Director Yael Latner; at the wedding, Bieber performed. Kanter mentions on his Twitter that he is a foodie.
