= Red Hands (song) =

Single by Walk off the Earth

from the album R.E.V.O.
- Released: 2 November 2012
- Recorded: 2012
- Genre: Indie rock; alternative rock
- Length: 3:01
- Label: Columbia
- Songwriters: Ryan Marshall; Gianni "Luminati" Nicassio; Sarah Blackwood; Thomas "Tawgs" Salter
- Producers: Tawgs Salter; Walk Off the Earth

Walk off the Earth singles chronology
"Somebody That I Used to Know" (2012)	"Red Hands" (2012)	"Gang of Rhythm" (2013)

Music video
- "Red Hands" on YouTube

"Red Hands" is a song by Canadian indie rock group Walk off the Earth. It was released on November 2, 2012 as the second single from their third studio album, R.E.V.O. (2013). The song was written by group members Ryan Marshall, Gianni "Luminati" Nicassio, and Sarah Blackwood, with additional writing from its co-producer Tawgs Salter.

Following its release, the song became a commercial success in North America. It reached number 9 on the Canadian Hot 100, surpassing the chart peak of its predecessor, and also topped the Billboard Adult Alternative Songs chart in the US.

== Background and writing ==
According to band member Gianni Luminati: "'Red Hands' is pretty open to interpretation and will mean different things to different people. When we originally wrote the song, we were thinking about taking responsibility for your actions and standing up on your own when things go wrong ... rather than blaming other people around you. Sometimes you just have to accept the circumstances that are thrown your way without pointing the finger."

== Music video ==
The music video for "Red Hands", directed by Ellis Bahl, is shot as a one take sequence of the song in a different order with parts filmed at a higher speed and others at a lower speed so the final result would present the song in its normal order with reshuffled images of the single take. To make the sequence possible, the band members had to learn the song in the rearranged order (with parts sung backwards). Bahl states in the 'Behind the scenes' video that it took nine full takes to complete the video and only the very last take is used for the actual video. The video premiered on NPR's All Songs Considered on November 1, 2012 and was uploaded on YouTube the next day. On November 8, the unedited version of the video was also uploaded on YouTube.

On March 5, 2013, the band uploaded an alternative version of the song on YouTube, appropriately named 'Big Guitar Version', with all five band members playing an oversized guitar - found in a pawn shop like stated in the video comments - thus echoing their rendition of Gotye's "Somebody That I Used to Know" uploaded one year and two months before.

The song was performed live to close out "Blast from the Past", an episode of The Listener.

== Charts ==
=== Weekly charts ===
Chart (2012–2013)	Peak position
Australia (ARIA)	59
Canada (Canadian Hot 100)	9
Canada AC (Billboard)	11
Canada CHR/Top 40 (Billboard)	8
Canada Hot AC (Billboard)	3
Canada Rock (Billboard)	33
US Bubbling Under Hot 100 (Billboard)	14
US Adult Pop Airplay (Billboard)	14
US Heatseekers Songs (Billboard)	21
US Hot Rock & Alternative Songs (Billboard)	15

=== Year-end charts ===
Chart (2013)	Position
Canada (Canadian Hot 100)	24
US Hot Rock Songs (Billboard)	32
US Adult Alternative Songs (Billboard)	7
US Adult Top 40 (Billboard)	40

== Certifications ==
Region	Certification	Certified units/sales
Canada (Music Canada)	2× Platinum	160,000^{*}
^{*} Sales figures based on certification alone.
