= Sarah Blackwood (Canadian singer) =

Canadian singer-songwriter (born 1980)

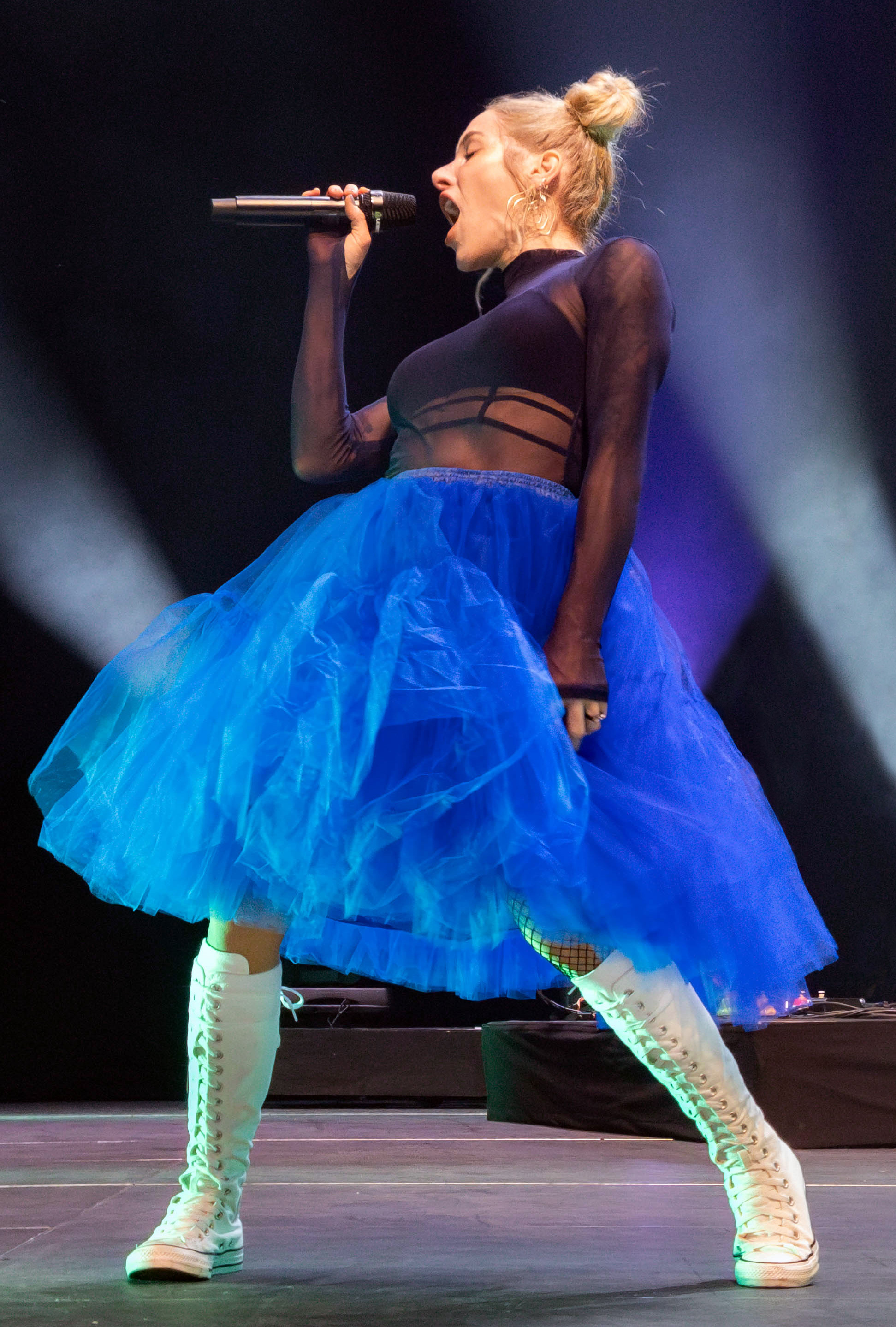
- Blackwood performing in 2025

Background information
- Also known as: Sarah Sin
- Born: Sarah Nicole Blackwood; October 18, 1980 (age 46); Burlington, Ontario, Canada
- Genres: Indie rock; indie pop; pop rock
- Occupations: Singer, musician
- Instruments: Vocals; guitar; ukulele; keyboards; bass; mandolin; percussion
- Years active: 2006–present
- Member of: Walk off the Earth
- Formerly of: The Creepshow

Sarah Nicole Blackwood (born October 18, 1980), also known as Sarah Sin, is a Canadian singer-songwriter. In 2012, she joined the indie pop band Walk off the Earth.

== Life ==
Blackwood was born in Burlington, Ontario. Most widely known as the frontwoman for Walk off the Earth, Blackwood got her start in the Canadian psychobilly band The Creepshow at the age of 27. Blackwood was initially supposed to fill in temporarily for her older sister, Jen "Hellcat" Blackwood, who was pregnant at the time. When Jen decided not to return to the band, Sarah became a full-time member. Blackwood has a brother, Ian Blackwood, who is also a musician. Blackwood has commented on her and her siblings' musical and artistic upbringings, often attributing her love of music to her parents' influence. Blackwood also advocates for anti-bullying initiatives and improved mental health services.

== Music career ==
In 2008, Sarah published her debut solo album Way Back Home and her first album with The Creepshow, Run For Your Life. In 2010, she released a second solo album, Wasting Time and They All Fall Down with The Creepshow. After gaining international fame with Walk off the Earth's cover of the song "Somebody That I Used to Know" by Australian singer Gotye, which went viral on YouTube with over 35 million views in two weeks, Sarah left The Creepshow in 2012. Fans of the Walk off the Earth, or WOTE-lings as they are referred to, sent the band's video to The Ellen DeGeneres Show and on 23 January 2012, the band made an appearance on the popular talk show, performing the song that propelled them to fame and would make way for their 2013 album R.E.V.O.

In 2013, Blackwood was featured on the song "Lonesome Rider" from the Danish heavy metal band Volbeat's fifth album Outlaw Gentlemen & Shady Ladies. The band's frontman Michael Poulsen told Ultimate-Guitar.com: "We knew her from back when we wanted to bring [The] Creepshow on tour."

Blackwood is the singer for Canadian indie band Walk off the Earth alongside members Gianni Luminati, and Joel Cassady. The band has been together since 2006 and was signed to Columbia Records in 2012.

In addition, Blackwood continues to produce videos to her solo YouTube channel, mainly cover songs, featuring her singing and playing acoustic guitar.

She also won a Juno Award (among other awards) with the band. They won a Juno in 2016.

== Family ==
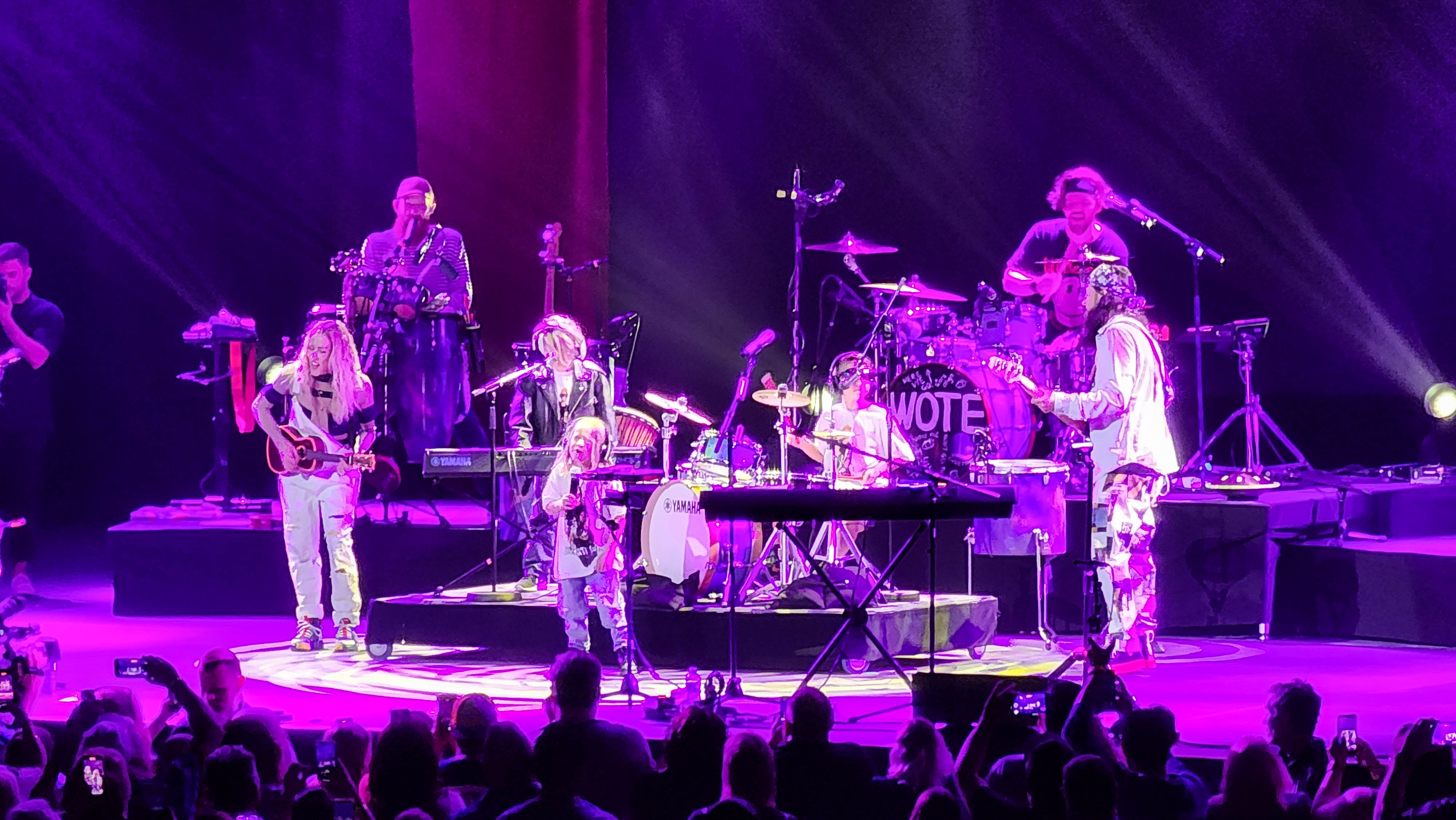
Blackwood and Nicassio performing with their children, 2023

Blackwood has been in a relationship with Walk off the Earth bandmate Gianni "Luminati" Nicassio since January 2012, and the couple has three sons: Giorgio Michael, born June 18, 2013; Luigi Colombo, born July 25, 2015; and Romeo Aniello, born August 23, 2017. Blackwood and Luminati are known for taking their children with them on tour, giving their eclectic musical style an added family-friendly element.

In 2015, while with her then two-year-old son Giorgio and seven months pregnant with her second child, Blackwood was kicked off a United Airlines flight from San Francisco to Vancouver because her child would not stop screaming. After being warned three times, Blackwood and her child were forced to exit the plane, yet the toddler was sound asleep by the time the singer's baggage was removed from the aircraft. Blackwood took to social media to air her grievances with the airline, who received negative feedback from what the Canadian musician called "discrimination", and positive reinforcement from frequent flyers who feel the air travel industry has been too accommodating to parents of disruptive and sometimes dangerously unruly children.

== Discography ==
as a solo artist

- 2008: Way Back Home
- 2011: Album "Live at CTO" with Daniel Flamm
- 2010: Wasting Time
- 2012: Wait It Out (EP)

with The Creepshow

- 2008: Run for Your Life
- 2010: They All Fall Down

with Walk off the Earth

- 2012: Vol. 1
- 2012: Vol. 2
- 2013: R.E.V.O.
- 2015: Sing It All Away
- 2017: Fire in My Soul
- 2019: Here We Go

with Lindsey Stirling

- 2024: Survive
