= Life After Death (The Creepshow album) =

Studio album by The Creepshow
- Released: October 22, 2013
- Genre: Psychobilly
- Length: 31:52
- Label: Stomp Records/"I Used to Fuck People Like You in Prison" Records

The Creepshow chronology
They All Fall Down (2010)	Life After Death (2013)

Life After Death is the fourth full-length album by Burlington, Ontario's The Creepshow released by Stomp Records, and the first to feature new band members Kenda Legapsi, Sandro Sanchioni and Daniel Flamm. The album was released on October 22, 2013 on cd, download and both black and white vinyl editions - the latter being a European exclusive.

== Track listing ==
1. "See You In Hell" - 3:25
2. "The Devil's Son" - 2:50
3. "Sinners + Saints" - 3:04
4. "Born To Lose" - 2:42
5. "Settle The Score" - 2:44
6. "Failing Grade" - 3:14
7. "Second Chance" - -2:44
8. "Last Call" - 2:52
9. "Take It Away" - 2:45
10. "Can't Wait To See You Fall" - 2:45
11. "Life After Death" - 2:55
