= My Rock =

Studio album by Walk off the Earth
- Released: July 30, 2010
- Recorded: 2009–2010 at B-Town Sound, Burlington, Ontario
- Genres: Reggae, alternative rock
- Length: 64:26
- Label: SlapDash Records
- Producer: Gianni Luminati

Walk off the Earth chronology
Smooth Like Stone on a Beach (2007)	My Rock (2010)	R.E.V.O. (EP) (2012)

My Rock is the second studio album by Canadian reggae band Walk off the Earth, released on July 30, 2010 through SlapDash Records. It contains two rerecorded, remixed and remastered tracks that originally appeared on Smooth Like Stone on a Beach.

== Track list ==
No.	Title	Length
1.	"Once in a While"	3:20
2.	"Julia"	2:41
3.	"Money Tree"	3:13
4.	"Coolin'"	3:50
5.	"100 Proof Life" (originally from Smooth Like Stone on a Beach)	3:54
6.	"Disappointment"	2:58
7.	"Broke" (originally from Smooth Like Stone on a Beach)	4:04
8.	"Silent Prep"	0:23
9.	"Luminati"	0:10
10.	"Once in a While (Chopped n Screwed)"	4:29
11.	"Petey Com Julia"	0:26
12.	"Julia (Chopped n Screwed)"	3:38
13.	"Petey Com Money Tree"	1:07
14.	"Money Tree (Chopped n Screwed)"	4:17
15.	"Petey Com Coolin'"	0:39
16.	"Coolin' (Chopped n Screwed)"	5:11
17.	"Petey Com 100 Proof Life"	0:35
18.	"100 Proof Life (Chopped n Screwed)"	5:14
19.	"Petey Com Disappointment"	1:17
20.	"Disappointment (Chopped n Screwed)"	4:00
21.	"Broke (Chopped n Screwed)"	6:15
22.	"Petey Com on Secret Track"	0:47
23.	"Corner of Queen"	1:58
Total length:		64:26

== Personnel ==
Walk Off the Earth

- Gianni Luminati – bass guitar, lead and rhythm guitars, vocals, additional drums
- Ryan Marshall – rhythm guitar, vocals, additional bass guitar
- Pete Kirkwood – drums, percussion

Production

- Production, engineering, mixing and mastering by Gianni Luminati
