= Right Left Wrong =

Single by Three Days Grace

from the album Outsider
- Released: November 13, 2018
- Recorded: 2017
- Genre: Alternative metal; hard rock
- Length: 3:57
- Label: RCA
- Songwriters: Neil Sanderson; Barry Stock; Brad Walst; Matt Walst; Gavin Brown
- Producers: Gavin Brown; Howard Benson; Three Days Grace

Three Days Grace singles chronology
"Infra-Red" (2018)	"Right Left Wrong" (2018)	"Somebody That I Used to Know" (2020)

Lyric video
- "Right Left Wrong" on YouTube

Music video
- "Right Left Wrong" on YouTube

"Right Left Wrong" is a song by Canadian rock band Three Days Grace. It was released as the third single from their sixth studio album Outsider on November 13, 2018. It was written by Neil Sanderson, Gavin Brown, Barry Stock, Brad Walst and Matt Walst. It is the band's 15th song to top the Mainstream Rock chart.

== Background and release ==
Bassist Brad Walst explained the song's meaning in an interview with Global News.

"It's relative to the feeling of wanting to get away from something that's controlling your life. It's a powerful message that shines through the heaviness of the music, especially at the end, where Matt gets really ramped up. We found that the song really resonated with our fans."

The song was originally released as a promotional single on March 3, 2018 and had its lyrics video premiere via Vevo that same day. It was officially released as the third and final single on November 13, 2018.

== Awards and nominations ==
"Right Left Wrong" won the Society of Composers, Authors and Music Publishers of Canada "Rock Music Award" in 2020.

== Charts ==
=== Weekly charts ===
Weekly chart performance for "Right Left Wrong"
Chart (2018–19)	Peak position
Canada Rock (Billboard)	5
US Hot Rock & Alternative Songs (Billboard)	25
US Rock & Alternative Airplay (Billboard)	13

=== Year-end charts ===
Year-end chart performance for "Right Left Wrong"
Chart (2019)	Position
US Mainstream Rock Songs (Billboard)	7

== Release history ==
Release history and formats for "Right Left Wrong"
Region	Date	Format	Label	Ref.
United States	November 13, 2018	Active rock	RCA	
