= R.E.V.O. =

Studio album by Walk off the Earth
- Released: March 19, 2013
- Recorded: 2011–13; Burlington, Ontario (B-Town Sound, Gianni's Kitchen)
- Genre: Indie, alternative
- Length: 36:31
- Label: Columbia
- Producer: Gianni "Luminati" Nicassio, Thomas "Tawgs" Salter, Walk off the Earth

Walk off the Earth chronology
R.E.V.O. EP (2012)	R.E.V.O. (2013)	Sing It All Away (2015)

Singles from R.E.V.O.
- 1. "Somebody That I Used to Know" Released: January 6, 2012; 2. "Red Hands" Released: November 2, 2012; 3. "Gang Of Rhythm" Released: December 12, 2012; 4. "Shake" Released: 2014

R.E.V.O. is the third studio album and debut major-label album by Canadian indie band Walk off the Earth. It was released on March 19, 2013, through Columbia Records. It contains 9 original songs, along with a cover of Gotye's "Somebody That I Used to Know" and Staylefish's "No Ulterior Motives".

R.E.V.O. is an acronym for the band's motto, Realize Every Victory Outright.

Professional ratings
Aggregate scores
Source	Rating
Metacritic	66/100
Review scores
Source	Rating
Allmusic	4/5 stars
Rolling Stone	2.5/5 stars

== Track listing ==
No.	Title	Writer(s)	Length
1.	"R.E.V.O."	Ryan Marshall, Gianni "Luminati" Nicassio, Sarah Blackwood, Thomas "Tawgs" Salter, Simon Wilcox	3:51
2.	"Red Hands"	Marshall, Nicassio, Blackwood, Salter	3:01
3.	"Gang of Rhythm"	Marshall, Nicassio, Blackwood, Salter	3:35
4.	"Speeches"	Marshall, Nicassio, Blackwood, Salter, Wilcox	3:20
5.	"Sometimes"	Marshall, Nicassio, Blackwood, Salter	2:52
6.	"Shake"	Marshall, Nicassio, Blackwood, Salter, Wilcox	2:58
7.	"Somebody That I Used to Know" (Gotye cover)	Walter De Backer	4:09
8.	"These Times"	Marshall, Nicassio	3:35
9.	"Summer Vibe"	Marshall, Nicassio, Blackwood, Salter, Wilcox	3:06
10.	"Money Tree"	Marshall, Nicassio	3:09
11.	"No Ulterior Motives"	Jason Duwyn, Marshall, Nicassio, Blackwood	2:55
Total length:			36:31

== Commercial performance ==
The album debuted at No. 7 on Top Canadian Albums. In the United States, the album debuted at No. 90 on Billboard 200, and No. 29 on Top Rock Albums, selling 5,000 copies in its first week. It has sold 51,000 copies in the US as of May 2015.

== Personnel ==
Per liner notes

Walk off the Earth

- Ryan Marshall
- Joel Cassady
- Mike Taylor
- Sarah Blackwood
- Gianni Luminati

Production

- Produced by Thomas "Tawgs" Salter, Gianni "Luminati" Nicassio, and Walk off the Earth
- Mixed by Lenny DeRose, Howie Beck, and Justin Koop
- Recorded by Gianni Luminati, Tawgs Salter, and Justin Koop
- Mastered by Vlado Meller; assisted by Mark Santangelo
- A&R by Mark Williams

== Charts and certifications ==
=== Charts ===
Chart (2013)	Peak position
Austrian Albums (Ö3 Austria)	29
Canadian Albums (Billboard)	7
US Billboard 200	90
US Top Alternative Albums (Billboard)	19
US Top Rock Albums (Billboard)	29

=== Certifications ===
Region	Certification	Certified units/sales
Canada (Music Canada)	Gold	40,000^{^}
^{^} Shipments figures based on certification alone.
