= The Mountain (song) =

Single by Three Days Grace

from the album Outsider
- Released: January 25, 2018
- Recorded: 2017
- Genre: Alternative metal; hard rock
- Length: 3:18
- Label: RCA
- Songwriters: Neil Sanderson; Barry Stock; Brad Walst; Matt Walst; Gavin Brown; Johnny Andrews
- Producers: Gavin Brown; Howard Benson; Three Days Grace

Three Days Grace singles chronology
"Fallen Angel" (2015)	"The Mountain" (2018)	"Infra-Red" (2018)

Music video
- "The Mountain" on YouTube

"The Mountain" is a song by Canadian rock band Three Days Grace. It was released on January 25, 2018 as the lead single from their sixth studio album Outsider. The song peaked at number one on the Billboard Mainstream Rock chart in March 2018 and became Three Days Grace's 13th number one on the chart while tying the record with Van Halen. The song is featured in the NBA 2K19 soundtrack.

== Background ==
In an interview with Digital Journal, bassist Brad Walst said "The Mountain" was originally written in September 2016 and about overcoming the daily difficulties in life. Three Days Grace's drummer Neil Sanderson similarly told iHeartRadio that the song was about dealing with repetitive events that you have to complete and left without a choice.

The song was written by Neil Sanderson, Gavin Brown, Barry Stock, Brad Walst, Matt Walst and Johnny Andrews.

== Recording ==
While talking with Detroit radio station WRIF, lead singer Matt Walst said he sang his highest ever during his musical career on "The Mountain". On the song's final chorus, Walst believed his voice reached a high D.

== Music video ==
"The Mountain" was released as the first single off Outsider on January 25, 2018 with an accompanying music video. In the music video, the band is singing in an Ultimate Fighting Championship ring with a guest appearance by Misha Cirkunov. The music video was directed by Sean Cartwright.

== Reception ==
Markos Papadatos of Digital Journal said "The Mountain" had "infectious riffs and strong hooks" alongside relevant and hopeful lyrics.

The band won the Rock Songwriters of the Year award for "The Mountain" on the 30th anniversary of the SOCAN Awards. The song also won the "No. 1 Song of the Year" award by SOCAN.

== Chart performance ==
In March 2018, "The Mountain" peaked at number one on the Billboard Mainstream Rock chart and became the 13th number-one song for Three Days Grace on the Billboard chart. With "The Mountain", Three Days Grace tied the record with Van Halen for the most number one songs on the Mainstream Rock chart.

== Personnel ==
Credits for "The Mountain" adapted from album's liner notes.

Three Days Grace

- Matt Walst – lead vocals, rhythm guitar
- Barry Stock – guitar
- Brad Walst – bass
- Neil Sanderson – drums, backing vocals, programming

Additional musicians

- Rhys Fulber – additional programming

Production

- Gavin Brown – producer
- Howard Benson – producer
- Three Days Grace – producer
- Mike Plotnikoff – engineer
- Chris Lord-Alge – mixing
- Ted Jensen – mastering at Sterling Sound, New York City
- Jill Zimmermann – engineer
- Darren Magierowski – engineer
- Adam Cagnon – engineer
- Nik Karpen – assistant engineer
- Paul Decarli – editing

== Charts ==
=== Weekly charts ===
Weekly chart performance for "The Mountain"
Chart (2018)	Peak position
Canada Rock (Billboard)	8
Czech Republic Rock (IFPI)	8
Germany Alternative (Deutsche Alternative Charts)	5
US Hot Rock & Alternative Songs (Billboard)	14
US Rock & Alternative Airplay (Billboard)	14

=== Year-end charts ===
Year-end chart performance "The Mountain"
Chart (2018)	Position
US Hot Rock Songs (Billboard)	45
US Rock Airplay (Billboard)	48

== Certifications ==
Certifications for "The Mountain"
Region	Certification	Certified units/sales
Canada (Music Canada)	Gold	40,000^{‡}
United States (RIAA)	Gold	500,000^{‡}
^{‡} Sales+streaming figures based on certification alone.

== Release history ==
Release dates and formats for "The Mountain"
Region	Date	Format	Label	Ref(s).
Various	January 25, 2018	Digital download	RCA	
United States	January 30, 2018	Mainstream rock	RCA	
