= Run for Your Life (The Creepshow album) =

Studio album by The Creepshow
- Released: August 22, 2008
- Genre: Psychobilly
- Length: 28:14
- Label: Stomp Records/Hellcat Records
- Producer: The Creepshow and Steve Rizun

The Creepshow chronology
Sell Your Soul (2006)	Run for Your Life (2008)	They All Fall Down (2010)

Run for Your Life is the second full-length album by Burlington, Ontario's The Creepshow released by Stomp Records. The album was released on August 22, 2008 in Compact Disc format and as a translucent green vinyl LP. The band's previous album Sell Your Soul was released by Stereo Dynamite Records. It was reissued in North America on October 5, 2009 on Hellcat Records upon the band's signing to the label.

The album features ten tracks, nine of which are original songs. The first track, "The Sermon II", is a spoken word introduction by organ player The Reverend McGinty in a Vincent Price-inspired voice. "The Sermon" was the first track of the band's previous album.

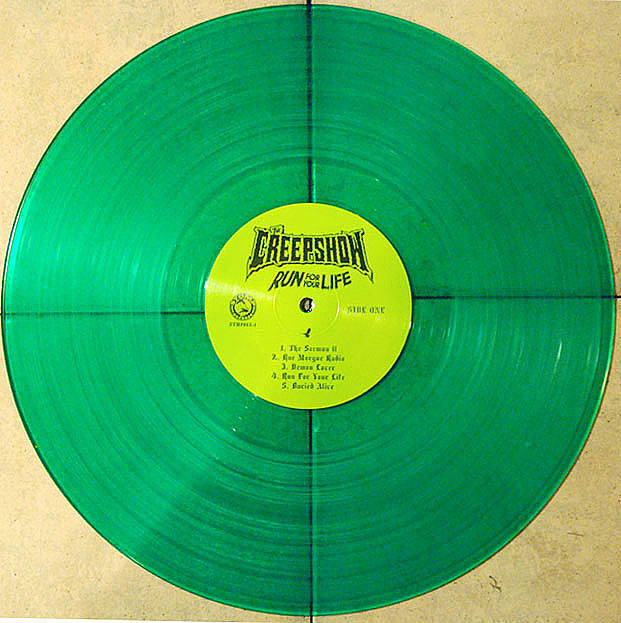
Run For Your Life translucent green vinyl LP

== Track listing ==
1. "The Sermon II" (0:55)
2. "Rue Morgue Radio" (2:43)
3. "Demon Lover" (3:14)
4. "Run for Your Life" (3:53)
5. "Buried Alive" (3:01)
6. "Take My Hand" (2:09)
7. "You'll Come Crawlin' " (3:27)
8. "Dearly Departed" (2:35)
9. "Rock 'n' Roll Sweetheart" (2:51)
10. "Long Way Down" (3:26)
11. "Pet Sematary" (Ramones bonus track)

== Band members ==
- Sean "Sickboy" McNab - Upright Bass / Backup Vocals
- Sarah "Sin" Blackwood - Guitar / Lead Vocals
- Paul "The Reverend" McGinty - Keys / Backup Vocals
- Matt "Pomade" Gee - drums

== Other contributors ==
- Steve Rizun - Engineering.
- Photography by Ashlea Wessel @ Revolver Photography.
- Design by "Ghoulish" Gary Pullin
