= They All Fall Down =

Studio album by The Creepshow
- Released: October 5, 2010
- Genre: Psychobilly
- Label: Stomp Records/"I Used to Fuck People Like You in Prison" Records

The Creepshow chronology
Run for Your Life (2008)	They All Fall Down (2010)	Life After Death (2013)

They All Fall Down is the third full-length album by Burlington, Ontario's The Creepshow released by Stomp Records. The album was released on August 5, 2010 in Compact Disc format and January 4, 2011 as LP.

== Track listing ==
1. "The Sermon III" - 0:50
2. "Get What's Coming" - 2:25
3. "Someday" - 2:57
4. "They All Fall Down" - 2:29
5. "Last Chance" - 1:45
6. "Sleep Tight" - 3:55
7. "Dusk 'Til Dawn" - -2:49
8. "Keep Dreaming" - 2:57
9. "Hellbound" - 2:53
10. "Going Down" - 2:44
11. "Road to Nowhere" - 3:50

=== Reception ===
The Album has received fair to strong ratings from the punk community. The site Chart Attack rated it 3.5/5.
