= Infra-Red (Three Days Grace song) =

Single by Three Days Grace

from the album Outsider
- Released: June 12, 2018
- Recorded: 2017
- Genre: Hard rock
- Length: 3:50
- Label: RCA
- Songwriters: Neil Sanderson; Barry Stock; Brad Walst; Matt Walst; Gavin Brown; Dan Kanter; Isiah Steinberg
- Producers: Gavin Brown; Howard Benson; Three Days Grace

Three Days Grace singles chronology
"The Mountain" (2018)	"Infra-Red" (2018)	"Right Left Wrong" (2018)

Lyric video
- "Infra-Red" on YouTube

"Infra-Red" is a song by Canadian rock band Three Days Grace. It was the second single from their sixth studio album Outsider. It topped the Billboard Mainstream Rock Songs chart in September 2018. It became the band's fourteenth song to top the chart.

== Background ==
After releasing "The Mountain" as the first single from their sixth studio album Outsider, the band chose "Infra-Red" as the album's second single. It was released as a single on June 12, 2018. A lyric video was released on July 9, 2018, with the lyrics displayed in a dark warehouse with red tinges of color. In September 2018, the song topped the Billboard Mainstream Rock chart, their fourteenth song to do so, surpassing Van Halen for the act with the most number-one songs on the chart since its inception in 1981. While the album version is a full band, electric performance, an acoustic rendition of the song was recorded in April 2018 for Radio.com.

The song was written by Neil Sanderson, Gavin Brown, Barry Stock, Brad Walst, Matt Walst, Dan Kanter and Isiah Steinberg. In 2018, the song won the SOCAN Awards for "No. 1 Song of the Year".

== Personnel ==
Three Days Grace

- Matt Walst – lead vocals, rhythm guitar
- Barry Stock – lead guitar
- Brad Walst – bass guitar
- Neil Sanderson – drums

Production

- Gavin Brown – producer
- Howard Benson – producer
- Three Days Grace – producer
- Mike Plotnikoff – engineer
- Chris Lord-Alge – mixing
- Ted Jensen – mastering

== Charts ==
=== Weekly charts ===
Weekly chart performance for "Infra-Red"
Chart (2018)	Peak position
Canada Rock (Billboard)	6
Czech Republic Rock (IFPI)	4
US Hot Rock & Alternative Songs (Billboard)	31
US Rock & Alternative Airplay (Billboard)	17

=== Year-end charts ===
Year-end chart performance for "Infra-Red"
Chart (2018)	Position
US Hot Rock Songs (Billboard)	94

== Certifications ==
Certifications for "Infra-Red"
Region	Certification	Certified units/sales
United States (RIAA)	Gold	500,000^{‡}
^{‡} Sales+streaming figures based on certification alone.
