= Breaking Benjamin discography =

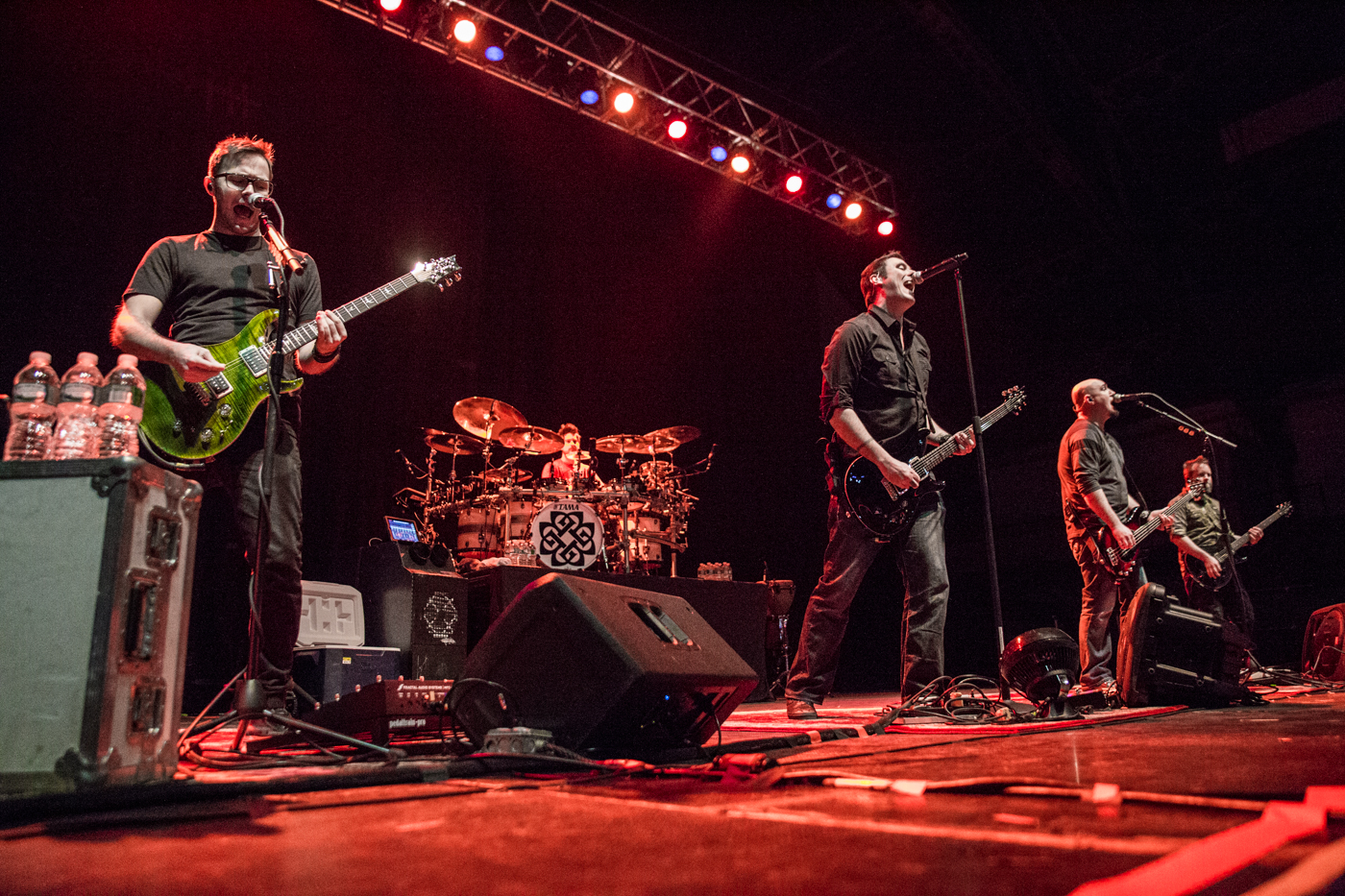
- Breaking Benjamin performing on February 14, 2015.
- Studio albums: 6
- Extended plays: 3
- Compilation albums: 2
- Singles: 24
- Music videos: 18

The American rock band Breaking Benjamin has released six studio albums, two compilation albums, three extended plays, 24 singles and 18 music videos. The group has sold over nineteen million units in the United States alone, with three platinum records, two gold records, three multi-platinum singles, three platinum singles, and six gold singles as designated by the RIAA. The band signed with Hollywood Records in 2002 following the success of their independently released eponymous EP, and began recording their first full-length major-label debut Saturate shortly thereafter. The record peaked at number two on the US Top Heatseekers chart and number 136 on the US Billboard 200. It was eventually certified gold in 2015. The band's sophomore effort, We Are Not Alone, released in 2004, peaked at number 20 on the US Billboard 200, and was later certified platinum in the United States and gold in New Zealand. Breaking Benjamin's third studio album Phobia was released in 2006 and reached number two on the US Billboard 200, number one on the US Digital Albums chart, number one on the US Top Rock Albums chart, and was later certified platinum in the United States, silver in the United Kingdom, and gold in New Zealand. Breaking Benjamin released their fourth record in late 2009 titled Dear Agony, reaching number one on the US Top Hard Rock Albums and US Top Alternative Albums charts, number two on the US Top Rock Albums and US Digital Albums charts, and number four on the US Billboard 200. The record was certified gold three months after its release and was later certified platinum.

Near the end of a tour supporting Dear Agony, front man Benjamin Burnley announced that he was ill and thereby no longer able to tour, placing the band on indefinite hiatus. During this time, guitarist Aaron Fink and bassist Mark Klepaski unilaterally permitted the compilation, recording, and release of Shallow Bay: The Best of Breaking Benjamin and a remix of the song "Blow Me Away" featuring Sydnee Duran of Valora. Burnley, asserting that the two had acted without consulting him, fired Fink and Klepaski. Shortly after the legal matters were settled in 2013, drummer Chad Szeliga announced his departure due to "creative differences". Shallow Bay was released in 2011, despite Burnley publicly opposing it, who said content had been altered without his consent and did not meet his standards. It went on to top the US Top Hard Rock Albums chart in three consecutive years, from 2011 to 2013.

In 2014, Burnley announced the band's reformation with a completely new lineup. Later in early 2015, the band announced a fifth full-length studio album titled Dark Before Dawn which was released in the summer of 2015, and debuted atop the US Billboard 200, the first to reach number one on that chart and was later certified gold in the United States. The band later released both the studio album Ember (2018) and their second compilation album Aurora (2020).

== Albums ==
=== Studio albums ===
List of studio albums, with selected chart positions and certifications
Title	Album details	Peak chart positions										Certifications
Title	Album details	US	US Rock	US Alt.	AUS	AUT	CAN	GER	NZ	SWI	UK	Certifications
Saturate	Release date: August 27, 2002; Label: Hollywood; Formats: CD, DI	136	—	—	—	—	—	—	—	—	—	RIAA: Gold
We Are Not Alone	Release date: June 29, 2004; Label: Hollywood; Formats: CD, DI, CS	20	—	—	—	—	—	—	14	—	—	RIAA: Platinum; RMNZ: Gold
Phobia	Release date: August 8, 2006; Label: Hollywood; Formats: CD (+DVD), DI, CS	2	1	—	—	—	—	—	16	—	—	RIAA: Platinum; BPI: Silver; RMNZ: Gold
Dear Agony	Release date: September 29, 2009; Label: Hollywood; Formats: CD (+DVD), DI, LP	4	2	1	—	—	13	—	22	—	—	RIAA: Platinum
Dark Before Dawn	Release date: June 23, 2015; Label: Hollywood; Formats: CD, DI, LP	1	1	1	11	49	1	34	11	66	34	RIAA: Gold
Ember	Release date: April 13, 2018; Label: Hollywood; Formats: CD, DI, LP	3	1	1	9	10	4	6	25	16	35	
"—" denotes a release that did not chart or a value that is not applicable.

=== Compilation albums ===
List of compilation albums, with selected chart positions and certifications
Title	Album details	Peak chart positions								Certifications
Title	Album details	US	US Alt.	US Hard	US Rock	US Taste.	AUS Dig.	CAN	GER	Certifications
Shallow Bay: The Best of Breaking Benjamin	Release date: August 16, 2011; Label: Hollywood; Formats: CD, DI	22	4	1	4	12	—	—	—	RMNZ: Gold
Aurora	Release date: January 24, 2020; Label: Hollywood; Formats: CD, DI	29	3	1	1	4	8	56	73	
"—" denotes a release that did not chart or a value that is not applicable.

=== Extended plays ===
List of extended plays
Title	Album details
Breaking Benjamin	Release date: 2001; Label: Self-released
Live EP	Release date: June 29, 2004; Label: Hollywood
So Cold EP	Release date: November 23, 2004; Label: Hollywood

== Singles ==
List of singles, with selected chart positions and certifications, showing year released and album name
Title	Year	Peak chart positions									Certifications	Album
Title	Year	US	US Alt.	US Main.	US Rock	US Hard Rock Digi.	US Hard Rock	CAN	CAN Rock	CZE Rock	Certifications	Album
"Polyamorous"	2002	—	31	19	—	—	—	—	—	—		Saturate
"Skin"	2003	—	37	24	—	—	—	—	—	—		Saturate
"So Cold"	2004	76	3	2	24	12	—	—	16	—	RIAA: Platinum; RMNZ: Gold	We Are Not Alone
"Sooner or Later"	2004	99	7	2	—	—	—	—	28	—		We Are Not Alone
"Blow Me Away"	2004	—	—	—	—	2	—	—	—	—		Halo 2 Original Soundtrack
"Rain"	2005	—	39	23	—	—	—	—	—	—		We Are Not Alone
"The Diary of Jane"	2006	50	4	2	—	12	—	—	15	14	RIAA: 4× Platinum; BPI: Gold; BVMI: Gold; IFPI DEN: Gold; RMNZ: 2× Platinum	Phobia
"Breath"	2007	84	3	1	—	19	—	87	8	—	RIAA: 2× Platinum; RMNZ: Gold	Phobia
"Until the End"	2007	—^{[A]}	21	6	—	—	—	—	—	—	RIAA: Gold	Phobia
"I Will Not Bow"	2009	40	5	1	1	3	—	98	37	—	RIAA: 3× Platinum; RMNZ: Gold	Dear Agony
"Give Me a Sign"	2010	97	10	6	9	—	—	—	—	—	RIAA: Gold	Dear Agony
"Lights Out"	2010	—	29	9	21	—	—	—	—	—		Dear Agony
"Blow Me Away" (remix) (featuring Valora)	2011	—^{[B]}	37	5	14	—	—	—	—	—	RIAA: Platinum	Shallow Bay: The Best of Breaking Benjamin
"Failure"	2015	80	28	1	8	1	—	—	35	15	RIAA: Gold	Dark Before Dawn
"Angels Fall"	2015	—	39	1	16	1	—	—	—	—	RIAA: Platinum	Dark Before Dawn
"Ashes of Eden"	2016	—	—	18	36	15	—	—	—	—	RIAA: Gold	Dark Before Dawn
"Never Again"	2016	—	—	1	28	—	—	—	—	—		Dark Before Dawn
"Red Cold River"	2018	—^{[C]}	—	2	5	1	—	—	—	—		Ember
"Torn in Two"	2018	—	—	1	25	15	—	—	—	—		Ember
"Tourniquet"	2018	—	—	6	44	—	—	—	—	—		Ember
"Far Away" (featuring Scooter Ward)	2019	—	—	1	12	—	—	—	—	—		Aurora
"Dear Agony" (featuring Lacey Sturm)	2020	—	—	13	—	—	—	—	—	—		Aurora
"Awaken"	2024	— (Note: "Awaken" did not enter the Hot 100, but peaked at number 6 on the US Digital Songs chart.)	37	1	17	1	2	—	13	—	RIAA: Gold	TBA
"Something Wicked"	2026	— (Note: "Something Wicked" did not enter the Hot 100, but peaked at number 14 on the US Digital Songs chart.)	40	1	—	1	2	—	39	—		TBA
"—" denotes a release that did not chart or a value that is not applicable.

=== As featured artist ===
Title	Year	Peak chart positions				Album
Title	Year	US Main.	US Rock	US Hard Rock Digi.	US Hard Rock	Album
"Iris" (with Diamante)	2020	—	—	1	8	American Dream
"Waiting on the Sky to Change" (with Starset)	2022	2	32	2	3	—N/a
"—" denotes a release that did not chart or a value that is not applicable.

Notes

- A "Until the End" did not chart on the Billboard Hot 100 but did peak at number 22 on the Bubbling Under Hot 100 Singles chart, which is an extension of the Billboard Hot 100.
- B The remixed version of "Blow Me Away" featuring Valora did not chart on the Billboard Hot 100 but did peak at number 20 on the Bubbling Under Hot 100 Singles chart, which is an extension of the Billboard Hot 100.
- C "Red Cold River" did not chart on the Billboard Hot 100 but did peak at number five on the Bubbling Under Hot 100 Singles chart, which is an extension of the Billboard Hot 100.

== Promotional singles ==
List of promotional songs, with selected chart positions, showing year released and album name
Title	Year	Peak chart positions		Album
Title	Year	US Hard Rock Digi.	US Rock	Album
"Medicate"	2003	—	—	Saturate
"Follow"	2005	—	—	We Are Not Alone
"Forget It"	2005	—	—	We Are Not Alone
"Anthem of the Angels"	2009	—	—	Dear Agony
"Defeated"	2015	1	23	Dark Before Dawn
"Breaking the Silence"	2015	25	—	Dark Before Dawn
"Feed the Wolf"	2018	1	12	Ember
"Blood"	2018	2	13	Ember
"Psycho"	2018	2	27	Ember
"Save Yourself"	2018	4	26	Ember
"Failure" (Aurora version)	2020	—	—	Aurora
"Red Cold River" (Aurora version)	2020	—	—	Aurora
"—" denotes a release that did not chart or a value that is not applicable.

== Other charted and certified songs ==
List of other charted songs, with selected chart positions and certifications, showing year released and album name
Title	Year	Peak chart positions			Certification	Album
Title	Year	US	US Rock	US Hard Rock Digi.	Certification	Album
"Dance with the Devil"	2006	—	—	—	RIAA: Gold	Phobia
"Dear Agony"	2009	—^{[D]}	—	—	RIAA: Gold	Dear Agony
"Blow Me Away"	2010	—^{[E]}	—	—	RIAA: Platinum	Non-album single
"The Dark of You"	2018	—	28	17		Ember
"Down"	2018	—	41	—		Ember
"—" denotes a release that did not chart or a value that is not applicable.

Notes

- D "Dear Agony" did not chart on the Billboard Hot 100 but did peak at number 21 on the Bubbling Under Hot 100 Singles chart, which is an extension of the Billboard Hot 100.
- E "Blow Me Away" did not chart on the Billboard Hot 100 but did peak at number one on the Bubbling Under Hot 100 Singles chart, which is an extension of the Billboard Hot 100.

== Music videos ==
List of music videos, showing year released and directors
Title	Year	Director	Ref.
"Polyamorous"	2002	Gregory Dark	
"So Cold"	2004	Adam Egypt Mortimer	
"Sooner or Later"	2005	Micha Dahan	
"The Diary of Jane"	2006	Ryan Smith	
"Breath"	2007	from live footage broadcast	
"I Will Not Bow"	2009	Rich Lee	
"Give Me a Sign"	2010	Nigel Dick	
"Blow Me Away" (featuring Valora)	2011	Christopher Mills	
"Failure"	2015	from live footage broadcast	
"Angels Fall"	2015	Joe Dietsch	
"Ashes of Eden"	2016	Kyle Cogan	
"Never Again"	2017	Kyle Cogan	
"Red Cold River"	2018	Kyle Cogan	
"Torn in Two"	2018	Kyle Cogan	
"Tourniquet"	2018	Kyle Cogan	
"Far Away" (featuring Scooter Ward)	2020	Kyle Cogan	
"Dear Agony" (Aurora version) (featuring Lacey Sturm)	2020	Kyle Cogan	
"Awaken"	2025	Kyle Cogan	
