= Aurora (Breaking Benjamin album) =

Compilation album by Breaking Benjamin
- Released: January 24, 2020
- Recorded: 2019
- Genres: Acoustic rock; symphonic rock; post-grunge; hard rock
- Length: 40:10
- Label: Hollywood
- Producer: Ben Burnley

Breaking Benjamin chronology
Ember (2018)	Aurora (2020)	Untitled (2027)

Singles from Aurora
- 1. "Far Away" Released: December 6, 2019; 2. "Dear Agony" Released: April 15, 2020

Professional ratings
Review scores
Source	Rating
AllMusic	3.5/5 stars
Sputnikmusic	2.2/5

Aurora is a compilation album by the American rock band Breaking Benjamin, released on January 24, 2020. The album is a collection of reimagined versions of previously released songs, plus one new song. This is their final album with Hollywood Records.

== Background ==
Details of the album were first reported in October 2019, that it would contain reworked versions of some of the band's biggest hits over the years. It also includes one new song, the lead single "Far Away" featuring Scooter Ward from Cold, which was released on December 6, 2019. The album also includes guest appearances from Lacey Sturm (formerly of Flyleaf), Michael Barnes of Red, Adam Gontier of Saint Asonia and Three Days Grace, and Spencer Chamberlain of Underoath.

== Composition ==
Aurora makes use of acoustic guitars, orchestral strings and piano, resulting in an acoustic rock and symphonic rock sound. The album is also described as post-grunge and retains hard rock elements on "So Cold", "Failure", "Red Cold River", "Tourniquet", "Never Again", and "Torn in Two".

"Dance with the Devil" is noted for "sounding more folky", and "Tourniquet" retains Benjamin Burnley's "aggressive growl" during the chorus.

== Track listing ==
All tracks are written by Benjamin Burnley, with additional writers where noted.

Aurora track listing
No.	Title	Writer(s)	Original release	Length
1.	"So Cold"	Aaron Fink; Mark Klepaski; Jeremy Hummel	We Are Not Alone (2004)	4:32
2.	"Failure" (featuring Michael Barnes of Red)		Dark Before Dawn (2015)	3:37
3.	"Far Away" (featuring Scooter Ward of Cold)			4:52
4.	"Angels Fall"		Dark Before Dawn (2015)	3:46
5.	"Red Cold River" (featuring Spencer Chamberlain)	Keith Wallen; Aaron Bruch; Jasen Rauch	Ember (2018)	3:18
6.	"Tourniquet"	Wallen; Bruch; Rauch; Shaun Foist	Ember (2018)	4:21
7.	"Dance with the Devil" (featuring Adam Gontier of Three Days Grace)	Klepaski	Phobia (2006)	3:44
8.	"Never Again"	Wallen; Rauch	Dark Before Dawn (2015)	3:41
9.	"Torn in Two"		Ember (2018)	4:04
10.	"Dear Agony" (featuring Lacey Sturm of Flyleaf)		Dear Agony (2009)	4:15
Total length:				40:10

== Personnel ==
Credits adapted from album's liner notes.

Breaking Benjamin
- Ben Burnley – vocals, guitar, producer
- Jasen Rauch – guitar, additional vocal engineering (track 2)
- Keith Wallen – guitar
- Aaron Bruch – bass
- Shaun Foist – drums

Guest artists

- Michael Barnes – vocals (track 2)
- Scooter Ward – vocals (track 3)
- Spencer Chamberlain – vocals (track 5)
- Adam Gontier – vocals (track 7)
- Lacey Sturm – vocals (track 10)

Additional musicians

- Carl Barc – additional orchestration, strings engineer
- Philip Dizack – trumpet
- Dave Eggar – string arrangements, orchestration, viola, cello
- Benjamin Fingland – clarinet, bass clarinet
- Jack Kessler – violin, viola
- Katie Kresek – violin, viola
- Sato Moughalian – flute
- Chuck Palmer – string arrangements, orchestration, conductor/leader
- Roger Wagner – string bass

Technical

- Dan Korneff – engineer, digital editing, and mixing; additional production (track 8)
- Sean Dorrian – additional engineering and digital editing
- Ted Jensen – mastering

== Charts ==
Chart performance for Aurora
Chart (2020)	Peak position
Australian Digital Albums (ARIA)	8
Canadian Albums (Billboard)	56
German Albums (Offizielle Top 100)	73
UK Album Sales (OCC)	95
UK Album Downloads (OCC)	33
US Billboard 200	29
US Top Alternative Albums (Billboard)	3
US Top Hard Rock Albums (Billboard)	1
US Top Rock Albums (Billboard)	1
