= Something Wicked (song) =

Single by Breaking Benjamin
- Released: May 13, 2026
- Genre: Hard rock
- Length: 3:29
- Label: BMG
- Songwriters: Benjamin Burnley; Keith Wallen; Jasen Rauch; Aaron Bruch
- Producer: Jasen Rauch

Breaking Benjamin singles chronology
"Awaken" (2024)	"Something Wicked" (2026)

Lyric video
- "Something Wicked" on YouTube

"Something Wicked" is a song by American rock band Breaking Benjamin. It was released as the second single from the band's upcoming untitled seventh studio album, through BMG on May 13, 2026. The song was written by vocalist Benjamin Burnley, rhythm guitarist Keith Wallen, lead guitarist Jasen Rauch, and bassist Aaron Bruch, and was produced by Rauch. It was the band's first song since 2011 not to feature Shaun Foist on drums, following his departure in December 2025, instead featuring James Cassells of Asking Alexandria, who had filled in as the band's touring drummer until May 2026.

== Background ==
On May 5, 2026, a countdown appeared on the band's website, which coincided with the band's performance at Welcome to Rockville festival, and contained a pre-save link for the single. The band then debuted the song at the festival on May 9, with Burnley stating he "never wants to play a new single until it's out," indicating that this was not a decision made by the band. The song was subsequently released as a single on May 13.

== Live performances ==
The song debuted live on May 9, 2026 at the Welcome to Rockville festival in Daytona Beach, Florida.

== Composition ==
"Something Wicked" has been compared to the band's older style from Saturate and We Are Not Alone, and has been described as rock, anthem rock, and 2000s rock.

== Personnel ==
Credits adapted from Tidal.

Breaking Benjamin

- Benjamin Burnley IV – lead vocals, guitar
- Jasen Rauch – lead guitar, programming, production, audio engineer
- Keith Wallen – rhythm guitar, backing vocals
- Aaron Bruch – bass, backing vocals

Additional personnel

- James Cassells (of Asking Alexandria) – drums
- Benjamin Burnley V – backing vocals
- Joe Rickard – audio engineer
- Julian Gargiulo – mixing, audio engineer
- Justin Jones – audio engineer
- Zakk Cervini – mastering, mixing engineer
- Luc Alexiades – mixing, engineering
- Mike Warren – recording, engineering

== Charts ==
Weekly chart performance for "Something Wicked"
Chart (2026)	Peak position
Canada Mainstream Rock (Billboard Canada)	39
US Alternative Airplay (Billboard)	40
US Digital Song Sales (Billboard)	14
US Hard Rock Digital Song Sales (Billboard)	1
US Hot Hard Rock Songs (Billboard)	2
US Mainstream Rock (Billboard)	1
