= Torn in Two =

2018 Breaking Benjamin song

Single by Breaking Benjamin

from the album Ember
- Released: May 29, 2018
- Recorded: 2017
- Genre: Alternative metal
- Length: 4:17
- Label: Hollywood
- Songwriter: Benjamin Burnley
- Producers: Benjamin Burnley; Keith Wallen; Aaron Bruch; Jasen Rauch

Breaking Benjamin singles chronology
| "Red Cold River" (2018) | "Torn in Two" (2018) | "Tourniquet" (2018) |

Music video
- "Torn in Two" on YouTube

"Torn in Two" is a song by American rock band Breaking Benjamin. It was their second single off of their album Ember. It topped the Billboard Mainstream Rock Songs chart in September 2018, outperforming the album's first single, "Red Cold River", which peaked at number two on the chart.

== Background and themes ==
The song was released as the second single from the band's sixth studio album Ember in April 2018. The song's music video continues the storyline portrayed in the video for "Red Cold River", the band's prior video, and is the second part of a trilogy of planned videos. While the video for "Red Cold River" chronicled a father finding his daughter had died, and finding the man who killed her, the video for "Torn in Two" chronicles the terrible emotions the father feels grappling with his lost daughter, and what he does afterwards. Visual effects and imagery appear on the screen as well, making allusions to Dante's Inferno and past Breaking Benjamin music videos, namely "Polyamorous", "So Cold", "The Diary of Jane", and "Never Again". The song and video's themes were meant to have an anti-child abuse message, and were released in April to bring awareness to April being National Child Abuse Prevention Month. In September 2018, the song topped the Billboard Mainstream Rock Songs chart, their sixth song to do so. Upon the release of Ember, the song was the second highest-charting song (second to "Red Cold River") of nine songs that charted on the Billboard Hot Rock Songs chart.

The song was also released as downloadable content (DLC) for the music-performing video game Rock Band.

== Reception ==
The song was praised by music publication Loudwire for being "very representative of the darker, heavier tone that the band is portraying on their Ember disc...accentuated with the perfect balance of soul-baring, primal aggression and hypnotically melodic moments."

== Personnel ==
Breaking Benjamin

- Benjamin Burnley – lead vocals
- Jasen Rauch – lead guitar
- Keith Wallen – rhythm guitar, backing vocals
- Aaron Bruch – bass, backing vocals
- Shaun Foist – drums

== Charts ==
| Chart (2018) | Peak position |
|---|---|
| US Mainstream Rock (Billboard) | 1 |
| US Rock Airplay (Billboard) | 17 |
| US Hot Rock Songs (Billboard) | 25 |
