= Awaken (song) =

Single by Breaking Benjamin
- Released: October 16, 2024
- Genre: Hard rock; alternative metal
- Length: 3:38
- Label: BMG
- Songwriters: Benjamin Burnley; Keith Wallen; Jasen Rauch
- Producers: Benjamin Burnley; Jasen Rauch

Breaking Benjamin singles chronology
"Waiting on the Sky to Change" (2022)	"Awaken" (2024)	"Something Wicked" (2026)

Music video
- "Awaken" on YouTube

"Awaken" is a song by American rock band Breaking Benjamin. It was released as the lead single from the band's upcoming untitled seventh studio album on October 16, 2024. Written and produced by the band's lead vocalist Benjamin Burnley and lead guitarist Jasen Rauch, "Awaken" was the first song by the band released via BMG, after the band left longtime label Hollywood Records. It was the final Breaking Benjamin single to feature Shaun Foist on drums, before his departure in December 2025.

== Background ==
Throughout 2022, the band began to write material for a follow-up to the band's sixth studio album, Ember (2018). Intending to release a new studio album, guitarist Jasen Rauch revealed in May 2023 that new material was currently in production and hoped that the band would release new music within the next year. In October 2024, it was revealed that the band had left longtime label Hollywood Records and had signed with BMG and was preparing to release new music imminently. On October 16, the band released "Awaken", their first new music in five years as the lead single from their upcoming untitled seventh studio album.

== Music video ==
The official music video for "Awaken" was released on January 10, 2025 and directed by Kyle Coogan. The music video takes place in a tundra setting, with a storyline of a woman exploring a mountainous region while coming across ice caves, ruins and prehistoric skeletons. It is intertwined with the band performing the song in the snow throughout the whole music video.

== Personnel ==
Credits adapted from Tidal.

Breaking Benjamin

- Benjamin Burnley IV – lead vocals, guitar, production
- Jasen Rauch – lead guitar, programming, production, audio engineer, digital editing
- Keith Wallen – rhythm guitar, backing vocals
- Aaron Bruch – bass, backing vocals
- Shaun Foist – drums

Additional personnel

- Benjamin Burnley V – backing vocals
- Zakk Cervini – mixing, mastering, audio engineer
- Julian Gargiulo – mixing assistance
- Kevin Skaff – audio engineer
- Carlos Chávez – audio engineer
- Joe Rickard – vocal engineer
- Mike Warren – audio engineer
- Paul DeCarli – digital editing

== Charts ==
=== Weekly charts ===
Weekly chart performance for "Awaken"
Chart (2024–2025)	Peak position
Canada Rock (Billboard)	13
US Digital Song Sales (Billboard)	6
US Hot Rock & Alternative Songs (Billboard)	17
US Rock Airplay (Billboard)	3

=== Year-end charts ===
Year-end chart performance for "Awaken"
Chart (2025)	Position
Canada Mainstream Rock (Billboard)	25
US Hot Rock & Alternative Songs (Billboard)	63
US Rock & Alternative Airplay (Billboard)	15

== Certifications ==
Certifications for "Awaken"
Region	Certification	Certified units/sales
United States (RIAA)	Gold	500,000^{‡}
^{‡} Sales+streaming figures based on certification alone.
