= Red Cold River =

Single by Breaking Benjamin

from the album Ember
- Released: January 5, 2018
- Recorded: 2017
- Genre: Hard rock; alternative metal
- Length: 3:23
- Label: Hollywood
- Songwriters: Aaron Bruch; Benjamin Burnley; Jasen Rauch; Keith Wallen
- Producers: Aaron Bruch; Benjamin Burnley; Jasen Rauch; Keith Wallen

Breaking Benjamin singles chronology
"Never Again" (2017)	"Red Cold River" (2018)	"Torn in Two" (2018)

Music video
- "Red Cold River" on YouTube

"Red Cold River" is a song by American rock band Breaking Benjamin. It was their lead single from their sixth studio album Ember.

== Background ==
"Red Cold River" was first announced as the lead single for the band's sixth studio album, Ember, in December 2017. A short teaser clip of the song was released on January 1, 2018, while the full song was later officially released on January 5, 2018. The song debuted number 38 on the Billboard Mainstream Rock Songs chart in its first week at radio, making it the biggest gainer on the chart of the week. A music video was released on January 18, 2018, featuring alternating footage of the band performing, and scenes of an anguished father who finds his missing daughter dead near a creek. The man meets a Native American woman who helps him see a vision of the man who killed his daughter and was a part of the search party. The father transforms into a monster, hunts down the killer, and beats him almost to death, but stops upon seeing the angel of his deceased daughter.

== Themes and composition ==
The song features a "dark and moody" guitar riff and quiet-loud dynamics, with sections of "lunging, low-slung rhythms juxtaposed by soaring atmospheric moments". The band's lead vocalist Benjamin Burnley employs screamed vocals in the pre-chorus, followed by clean, melodic vocals in the chorus, singing the dark lines "I can't feel anything at all / this life has left me cold and damned". The song's "heavy yet melodic" sound was compared to prior Breaking Benjamin songs "I Will Not Bow" and "The Diary of Jane".

== Reception ==
Initial critical reception of the song was mixed. Metal Injection praised the song for being "catchy" and having a "memorable enough hook" that takes effect after hearing the song three times. MetalSucks was less enthusiastic, criticizing that it sounded too much like early 2000s rock music from the band and similar artists such as Seether and Theory of a Deadman.

In its first week of release, the song sold 22,000 copies in the US.

== Personnel ==
- Benjamin Burnley – lead vocals
- Jasen Rauch – lead guitar
- Keith Wallen – rhythm guitar, backing vocals
- Aaron Bruch – bass, backing vocals
- Shaun Foist – drums

== Charts ==
=== Weekly charts ===
Weekly chart performance for "Red Cold River"
Chart (2018)	Peak position
US Bubbling Under Hot 100 (Billboard)	5
US Digital Song Sales (Billboard)	14
US Hot Rock & Alternative Songs (Billboard)	5
US Rock & Alternative Airplay (Billboard)	13

=== Year-end charts ===
Year-end chart performance for "Red Cold River"
Chart (2018)	Position
US Hot Rock Songs (Billboard)	32
