= Breaking Benjamin =

American rock band

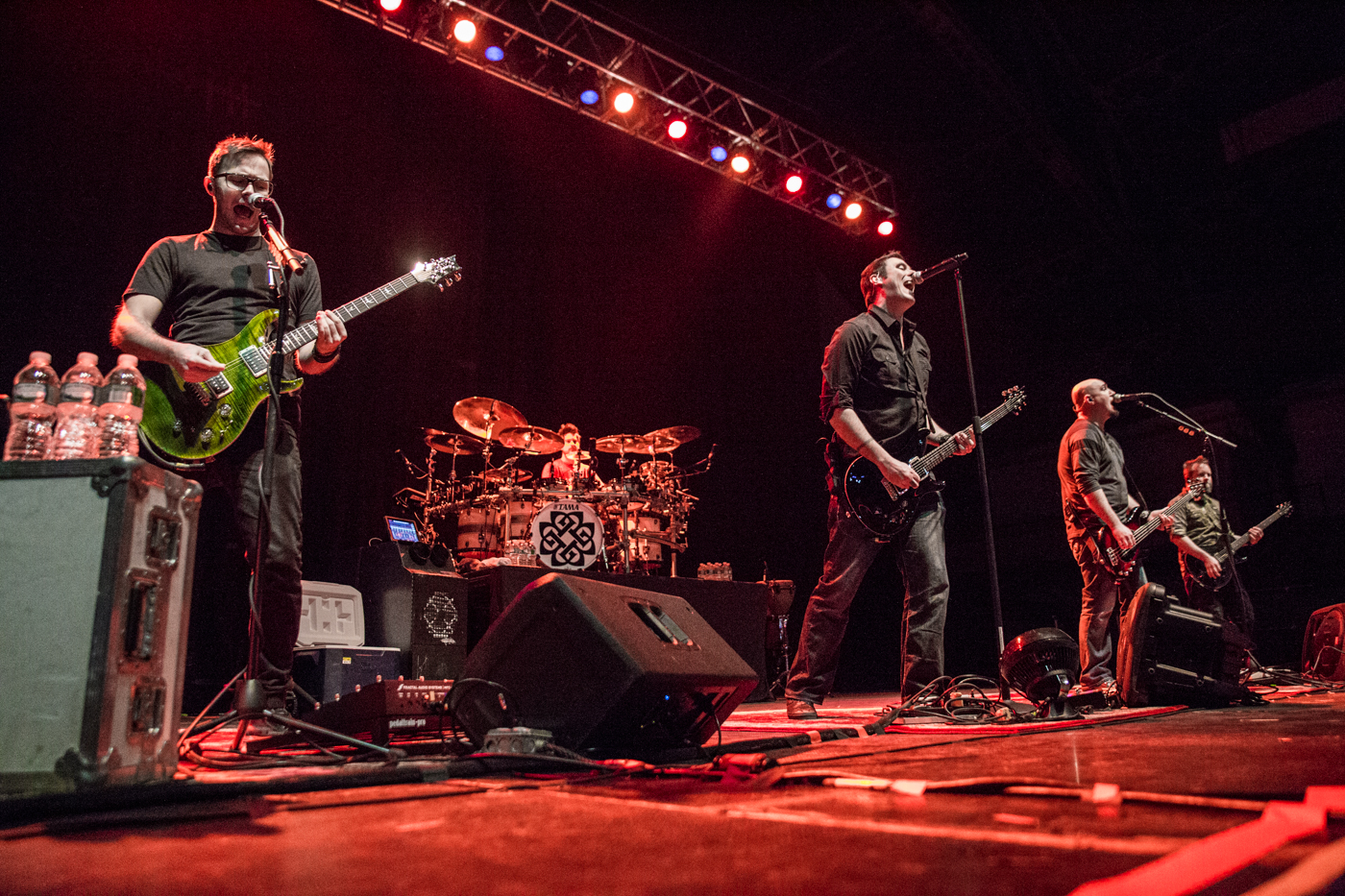
- Breaking Benjamin performing in 2015. From left to right, Keith Wallen, Shaun Foist, Benjamin Burnley, Aaron Bruch, and Jasen Rauch.

Background information
- Also known as: Plan 9
- Origin: Wilkes-Barre, Pennsylvania, U.S.
- Genres: Hard rock; post-grunge; alternative metal; alternative rock
- Works: Discography
- Years active: 1999–2010; 2014–present
- Labels: Hollywood; BMG
- Members: Benjamin Burnley; Aaron Bruch; Jasen Rauch; Keith Wallen
- Past members: Jason Davoli; Jonathan "Bug" Price; Jeremy Hummel; Aaron Fink; Mark James Klepaski; Chad Szeliga; Shaun Foist
- Website: breakingbenjamin.com

Breaking Benjamin is an American rock band from Wilkes-Barre, Pennsylvania, formed in 1999 by lead singer and guitarist Benjamin Burnley and drummer Jeremy Hummel. The first lineup of the band also included guitarist Aaron Fink and bassist Mark James Klepaski. This lineup released two albums, Saturate (2002) and We Are Not Alone (2004), before Hummel was replaced by Chad Szeliga in 2005. The band released two more studio albums, Phobia (2006) and Dear Agony (2009), before entering an extended hiatus in early 2010 due to Burnley's recurring illnesses.

Amid the hiatus, the release of a compilation album, Shallow Bay: The Best of Breaking Benjamin (2011), unauthorized by Burnley, brought about legal trouble within the band resulting in the dismissal of Fink and Klepaski. Szeliga later announced his departure in 2013 citing creative differences. Burnley remained the sole member of the band until late 2014, when the new lineup was announced, including bassist and backing vocalist Aaron Bruch, guitarist and backing vocalist Keith Wallen, guitarist Jasen Rauch, and drummer Shaun Foist. The band afterward released Dark Before Dawn (2015) and Ember (2018), which debuted at number one and three on the Billboard 200, respectively. Following these albums, the band released another compilation, Aurora (2020), featuring reworked acoustic versions of past songs along with one original new song.

Despite significant lineup changes, the band's musical style and lyrical content have remained consistent, with Burnley serving as the primary composer, lead vocalist, and sole consistent member since the band's inception. The band has commonly been noted for its formulaic hard rock tendencies with angst-heavy lyrics, swelling choruses, and "crunching" guitars. In the United States alone, the band has sold more than 19 million units and yielded three RIAA-certified platinum records, two gold records, and several certified singles, including three multi-platinum, three platinum, and six gold.

== History ==
=== Formation and Saturate (1998–2003) ===
Benjamin Burnley was originally in a band named Breaking Benjamin in 1998, that played "softer music", such as Weezer and the Beatles covers, and was "nothing like" subsequent lineups. The name originates from an incident in which Burnley broke a borrowed microphone, prompting its owner to retort, "Thanks to Benjamin for breaking my fucking mic". This band included guitarist Aaron Fink, bassist Nick Hoover, and drummer Chris Lightcap, but soon broke up when Burnley moved to California. After returning to Pennsylvania with drummer Jeremy Hummel, Burnley formed Plan 9, which also included bassist Jason Davoli. Plan 9, a reference to Plan 9 from Outer Space, was continually misnamed as "Planet 9". Therefore, the group reclaimed the name Breaking Benjamin from the previous band, as Burnley still had promotional stickers with that name.

"Polyamorous" (EP version)
Sample of the EP version of "Polyamorous", as first heard on Fabbri's radio station in 2001.

The three-piece first gained attention when Freddie Fabbri, a DJ for active rock radio station WBSX, put the group's track "Polyamorous" in rotation. After it became the number one requested track on the station, Fabbri financed the recording of the group's eponymous EP, which sold all 2,000 copies that were printed in 2001. Jonathan "Bug" Price was credited on bass, replacing Davoli. After growing dissatisfied with their previous band Lifer, former bandmate Aaron Fink and bassist Mark James Klepaski joined Breaking Benjamin. In early 2002, over a dozen record companies visited a two-night showcase where Breaking Benjamin was playing, and the group subsequently signed with Hollywood Records. Shortly afterward, Breaking Benjamin began recording their first full-length major-label record, Saturate, which was released on August 27, 2002, and produced by Ulrich Wild. It peaked at No. 136 on the Billboard 200, and was later certified gold on September 25, 2015. In early 2003, Breaking Benjamin participated in the Jägermeister Music Tour, then toured as a supporting act for Godsmack.

Out of the little media coverage received, Saturate garnered positive reception, with Jason Taylor from AllMusic stating that the album "has serious potential to become one of 2002's most successful debuts", feeling that "although it is repetitive and generic, it is undeniably addictive", ultimately scoring the album 2.5 out of 5. The disc received a favorable review from Schwegweb's Vin Cherubino, who noted, "The music has just as much quality as any popular artist in the same genre. Influences from bands such as Tool can be heard, making the music seem all so familiar and palatable."

=== We Are Not Alone (2003–2005) ===
Breaking Benjamin returned to the studio in October 2003 with producer David Bendeth for their second album We Are Not Alone. Burnley also worked with The Smashing Pumpkins front man Billy Corgan over the course of six days in December 2003 to write the songs "Rain", "Forget It", and "Follow". Despite initially being nervous, Burnley felt it was one of the highlights of his career.

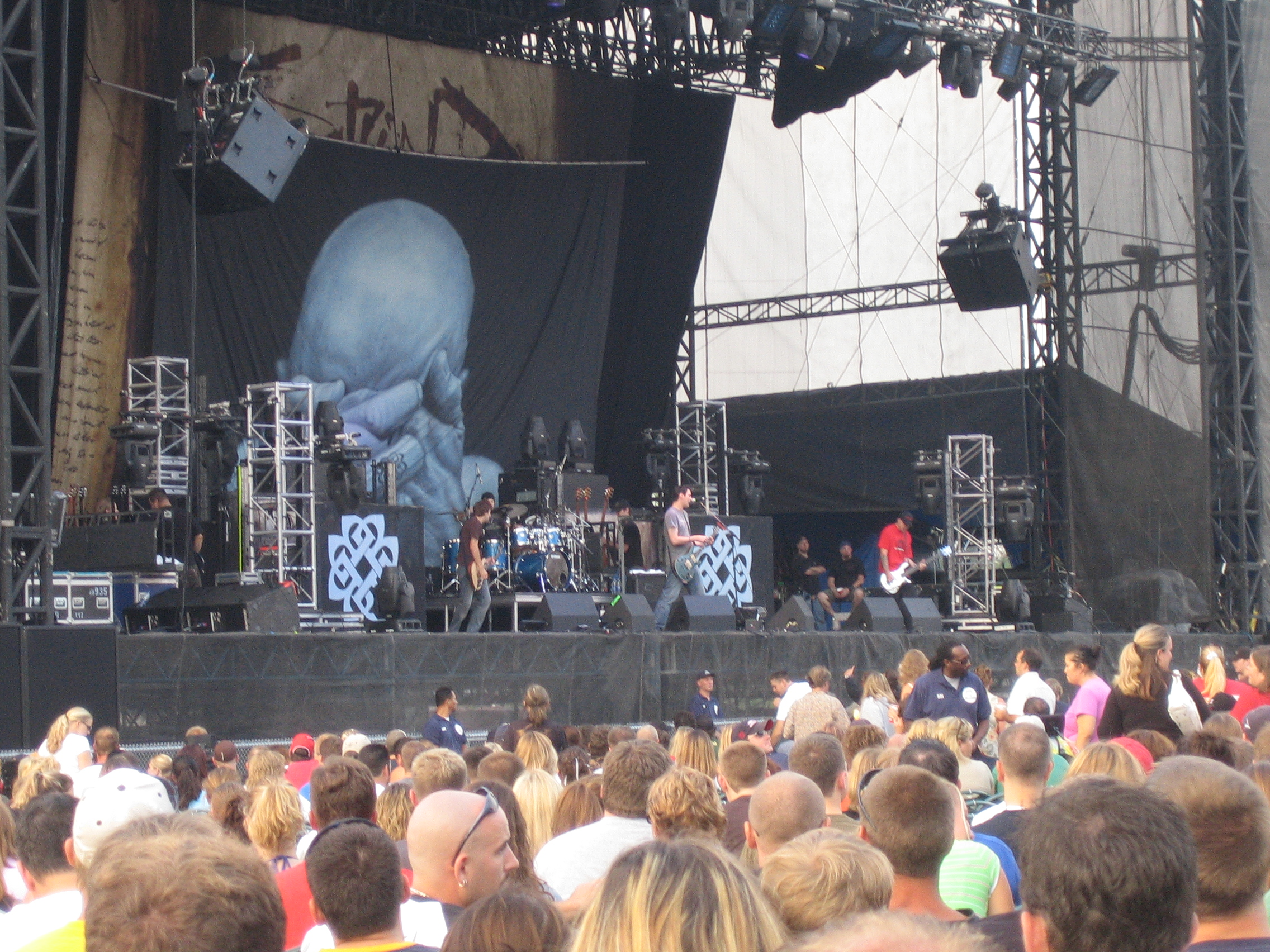
Breaking Benjamin performing at the Minnesota State Fair on August 25, 2005

The album was released on June 29, 2004, and sold 48,000 copies in its first week, peaking at No. 20 on the Billboard 200. It was later certified gold on October 21, 2004, then platinum on June 13, 2005. It was also certified gold in New Zealand on August 29, 2005. The record features singles such as "So Cold" and "Sooner or Later", both of which peaked at No. 2 on the Mainstream Rock Songs chart. "So Cold" became a platinum single on September 25, 2015. MTV writer Jon Wiederhorn writes that the initial commercial success of the album can be attributed to a tour two weeks prior to the album's debut which "generated prerelease buzz". They later co-headlined a tour with Evanescence, Seether, and Three Days Grace.

We Are Not Alone garnered mixed reviews. It was met with high acclaim from IGN's Colin Moriarty, who felt "extremely satisfied", saying "safely and confidently" that it "might be [his] personal favorite album of the year". He gave it a score of 9.3 out of 10. Conversely, Exclaim! writer Amber Authier said, "On first listen its simply generic sound did nothing for me." Though she later admitted, "I listened to Breaking Benjamin several times over a week and several elements of the disc started to grow on me, even appeal to me." The writer concluded, "Breaking Benjamin created a standard of quality for themselves that they simply couldn't meet on the entire disc."

On November 3, 2004, a non-album single named "Blow Me Away" from the Halo 2 Original Soundtrack was released, to commercial success, ultimately going platinum on January 21, 2021. On November 23, 2004, Breaking Benjamin released the So Cold EP, which features live versions of the songs "Away" and "Breakdown", a live acoustic version of "So Cold", and studio acoustic recordings of "Blow Me Away" and "Lady Bug".

In late 2005, drummer Hummel filed a federal lawsuit against Breaking Benjamin. According to the lawsuit, Hummel requested earlier that year to take a paternity leave to be with his wife during the birth of their first child, to which all members of the band agreed and hired Kevin Soffera as a temporary substitute on drums. However, Burnley later called Hummel and terminated him, citing chemistry issues. In the lawsuit, Hummel contended wrongful termination and lack of compensation for profits accrued by We Are Not Alone and other non-album tracks that appeared in Halo 2 and National Treasure: Book of Secrets. The band's manager, Larry Mazer (who was also named in the lawsuit), asserted that the lawsuit was "totally frivolous" and his termination had "nothing to do with the paternity leave".

Mazer said the band received no payment for the Halo 2 appearance, adding that the song was included for promotional reasons and Burnley was happy to have it in the video game. The band received minimal payment for the National Treasure 2 appearance, and Mazer stated that otherwise, "[Hummel] is 100 per cent current". Ben "B.C." Vaught served as a sit-in drummer for the band, and they later toured with 3 Doors Down and Staind in November 2005. The lawsuit was settled for an undisclosed amount in April 2006.

=== Phobia (2005–2007) ===
After the departure of Jeremy Hummel, Breaking Benjamin auditioned fifteen drummers, of whom Chad Szeliga stood out for his ability as a stage performer and the fact that he had "serious problem-solving skills", according to Burnley. The group's next album, Phobia, was again produced by Bendeth and was the first to be recorded with Szeliga. The concept of the album is dedicated to Burnley's various phobias. The cover of the album depicts a winged man suspended over a runway, which represents Burnley's fear of flying. Burnley also suffers from death anxiety, a fear of the dark, driving anxiety, and hypochondria. Burnley cites his fear of flying as for why he did not perform overseas, saying, "I'll go as far as a boat will take me", though at the time the band's record label had not facilitated travel by boat. Phobia's "Intro" and "Outro" tracks feature sound effects of an airport intercom, airplane turbulence, car doors, and crowd panic.

Phobia was released on August 8, 2006, to commercial success. The album sold more than 131,000 copies in its first week of sales and peaked at No. 2 on the Billboard 200. It went gold on November 8, 2006, then platinum on May 21, 2009. Its lead single, "The Diary of Jane", peaked at No. 2 on the Mainstream Rock Songs chart and was the fastest single added to radio playlists in the history of Hollywood Records, later receiving a double platinum certification on November 24, 2015. "Breath", the record's second single, spent seven weeks at No. 1 on the Mainstream Rock Songs chart and went platinum on November 24, 2015. The third single, "Until the End", peaked at No. 6 on the same chart and became a gold single on February 11, 2014.

In February 2007 in support of Phobia, AXS TV (then known as HDNet) aired a one-hour Breaking Benjamin concert from Stabler Arena in Bethlehem, Pennsylvania. The broadcast recording was included on the re-released Phobia DVD in April, billed as "The Homecoming". A music video was created for "Breath", which was made from footage of the song's performance at the show. Breaking Benjamin followed with spring and fall tours alongside Three Days Grace, accompanied by Puddle of Mudd during the spring tour and Seether, Skillet, and Red during the fall tour.

Phobia received mixed critical reception. It received praise for general composition and musicianship but received criticism for a lack of originality. AllMusic's Corey Apar found the album "nothing if not consistent" and, while generally regarding the album with positive sentiments, noted a lack of distinction from the "rest of the post-grunge/alt-metal pack" aside from "a certain charm". IGN's Spence D. gave the disc a negative review, citing tedium and lack of vocal distinction, feeling that the group's "intersection of hard rock and emo-oriented introspection" is "not a bad thing, but also not a terribly memorable or earth-shattering one, either". However, the writer praised the musicianship of Fink, Klepaski, and Szeliga, ultimately giving the album a score of 5.7 out of 10. Entertainment Weekly graded the album C+ and noted its angst-ridden themes, saying, "As pathological angst goes, it's expertly done, with expansive choruses and epic riffs—not that that matters, when, like, we're all going to die cold and alone anyway."

=== Dear Agony (2009–2010) ===
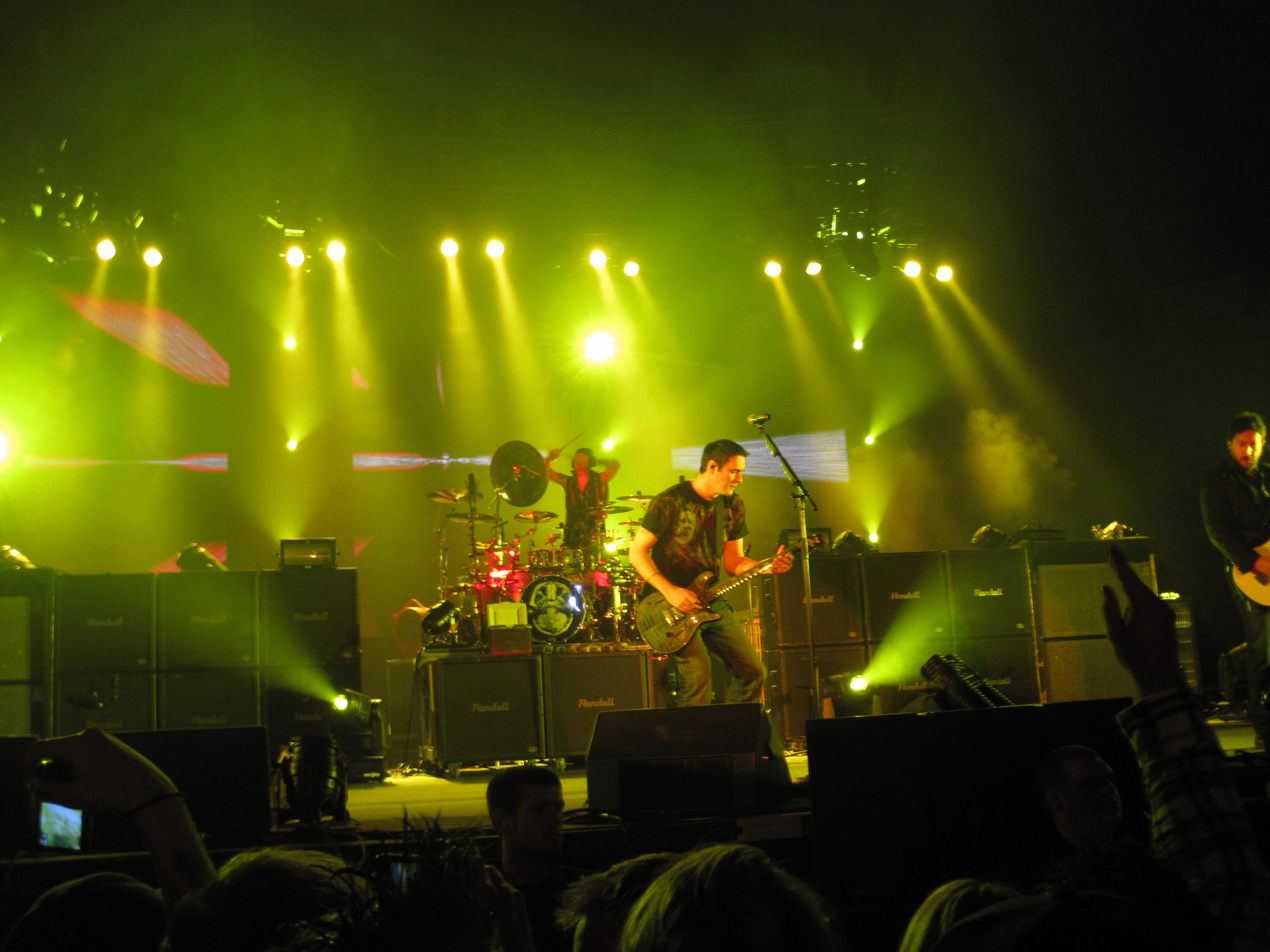
Breaking Benjamin performing in Fort Wayne, Indiana, in January 2010

Breaking Benjamin began working on a fourth album, titled Dear Agony, in 2009. It was the first album Burnley wrote while completely sober. In 2007, Burnley experienced fatigue and phosphenes following three consecutive days of no sleep and heavy drinking, after which he decided to remain sober. Burnley acknowledged an improved clarity and coherence within Dear Agony due to his sobriety. The album cover features Burnley's brain scan, representing the recurrent themes on Dear Agony related to the singer's chronic illnesses caused by alcohol consumption.

Burnley collaborated with then-Red guitarist Jasen Rauch on various tracks for Dear Agony: The two equally wrote together the songs "Without You" and "Hopeless", and Rauch wrote the outro for "I Will Not Bow", also helping write "Lights Out". Burnley said of the collaboration, "I love writing with [Jasen] because he does stuff exactly like I would've done." He also said that "writing-wise", he and Jasen are "like the same person".

Dear Agony was released on September 29, 2009, and peaked at No. 4 on the Billboard 200. The disc initially outsold its predecessor in its first week, moving more than 134,000 copies. It ultimately achieved gold certification on February 16, 2010. The album's lead single "I Will Not Bow" reached No. 1 on the Mainstream Rock Songs chart, and went platinum on November 24, 2015. The other two singles, "Lights Out" and "Give Me a Sign", peaked at No. 9 and No. 6 on the Mainstream Rock Songs chart, respectively (the latter of which also receiving a gold certification on November 24, 2015).

Breaking Benjamin toured in support of the album in January and February 2010 with Three Days Grace and Flyleaf, then with Red, Chevelle, and Thousand Foot Krutch in March 2010. In April, Breaking Benjamin began touring with Nickelback, Shinedown, and Sick Puppies on their Dark Horse Tour. Prior to the last show of the Dark Horse Tour, Burnley stated he was ill and therefore no longer able to tour in support of the album, placing the band on hiatus. After internet rumors began to circulate that the band had broken up, Burnley released a statement "officially letting everyone know that Breaking Benjamin has not broken up".

Dear Agony received mixed critical reception. AllMusic's James Monger gave the album a positive review, stating it "feels a lot like their first three", noting a consistency that "feels like a well-oiled machine". The disc received a negative review from Consequence of Sound's Alex Young, who complained of over-production and the disc's sell-out nature at the hands of three-time Breaking Benjamin producer David Bendeth: "Dear Agony is the unfortunate side effect of a trend in 'producer' David Bendeth's world, training wild chimpanzees to be more tasteful whilst handling silverware", ultimately giving the record a half-star "for teaching Breaking Benjamin's peers who not to hire for production credit". About Entertainment gave the record a mixed review, feeling that "though it lacks the breakthrough singles of Phobia, Dear Agony does have its moments", adding, "frustratingly, Dear Agony never reaches greatness, settling for an admirable competency that's still the envy of many of their contemporaries".

=== Hiatus and Shallow Bay (2010–2013) ===
In March 2010, Hollywood Records requested that the band produce two new master recordings and a greatest hits album, and sought permission to release a new version of the hit song "Blow Me Away" featuring Sydnee Duran of Valora. In May 2011, Fink and Klepaski granted the record company's requests after they were offered a $100,000 payment. Burnley, alleging that Fink and Klepaski acted unilaterally on both the song remix and the compilation album, not informing him or the band's management, fired the two via email, demanding at least $250,000 in punitive fees and compensatory damages, as well as the exclusive right to the name Breaking Benjamin.

Fink and Klepaski's attorneys stated the two "dispute and strictly deny" Burnley's allegations, instead asserting that a January 2009 agreement (allowing Burnley to dismiss them for "just cause") was no longer valid because of the singer's status of indefinite hiatus. The case was ordered by a judge to arbitration. Burnley's attorney, Brian Caplan, told the Associated Press, "The relationship between Mr. Burnley and the two other members of the band has ended. ... Mr. Burnley intends on moving forward using the name Breaking Benjamin and the band will continue. It just won't continue in its prior configuration. He's not retiring."

In August 2011, Hollywood Records scheduled the release of the Shallow Bay: The Best of Breaking Benjamin compilation album, featuring every single from the band's catalog, including the remix of "Blow Me Away". A two-disc deluxe edition was released alongside it, with the second disc containing altered versions of b-sides and rarities. Burnley publicly opposed the album's release, saying content had been altered without his consent and did not meet his standards. Burnley later elaborated, saying that the rarities were taken off of his laptop without his consent, and were intended for in-studio reference and not public release, but that he was otherwise content with previously released tracks on Shallow Bay.

The album was released on August 16, 2011, and peaked at No. 22 on the Billboard 200, also topping the Hard Rock Albums chart in 2011, 2012, and 2013. The disc received positive critical reception. The Daily Trojan's Krishna Jetti praised it for balance and a progressive retrospective history. AllMusic's Gregory Heaney felt similarly, saying, "Shallow Bay is a great jumping-on point for new fans, capturing the band at their height delivering some of their best moments in one convenient package. For older fans, this collection may just serve as a reminder of a crucial turning point in Breaking Benjamin's career."

In April 2013, Burnley announced that the dispute involving Fink and Klepaski was resolved and that he would retain the right to continue the band under the name Breaking Benjamin. Three days later, Szeliga announced his departure, citing creative differences.

=== Return and Dark Before Dawn (2014–2016) ===
In August 2014, Breaking Benjamin announced via Facebook that the band reformed as a quintet with, except for Burnley, all new members, including: Dear Agony co-writer Jasen Rauch (guitar, originally from Red); Keith Wallen (guitar and backing vocals, originally from Adelitas Way); Aaron Bruch (bass and backing vocals); and Shaun Foist (drums, originally from Picture Me Broken). Burnley said of the lineup, "Everybody that's in the band now is deliberately handpicked." And he noted that "Keith [Wallen] and Aaron [Bruch] are really, really amazing singers. That's kind of what the band always needed." On March 18, 2015, a new single entitled "Failure" as well as a new album, Dark Before Dawn, were announced for release on March 23 and June 23, respectively.

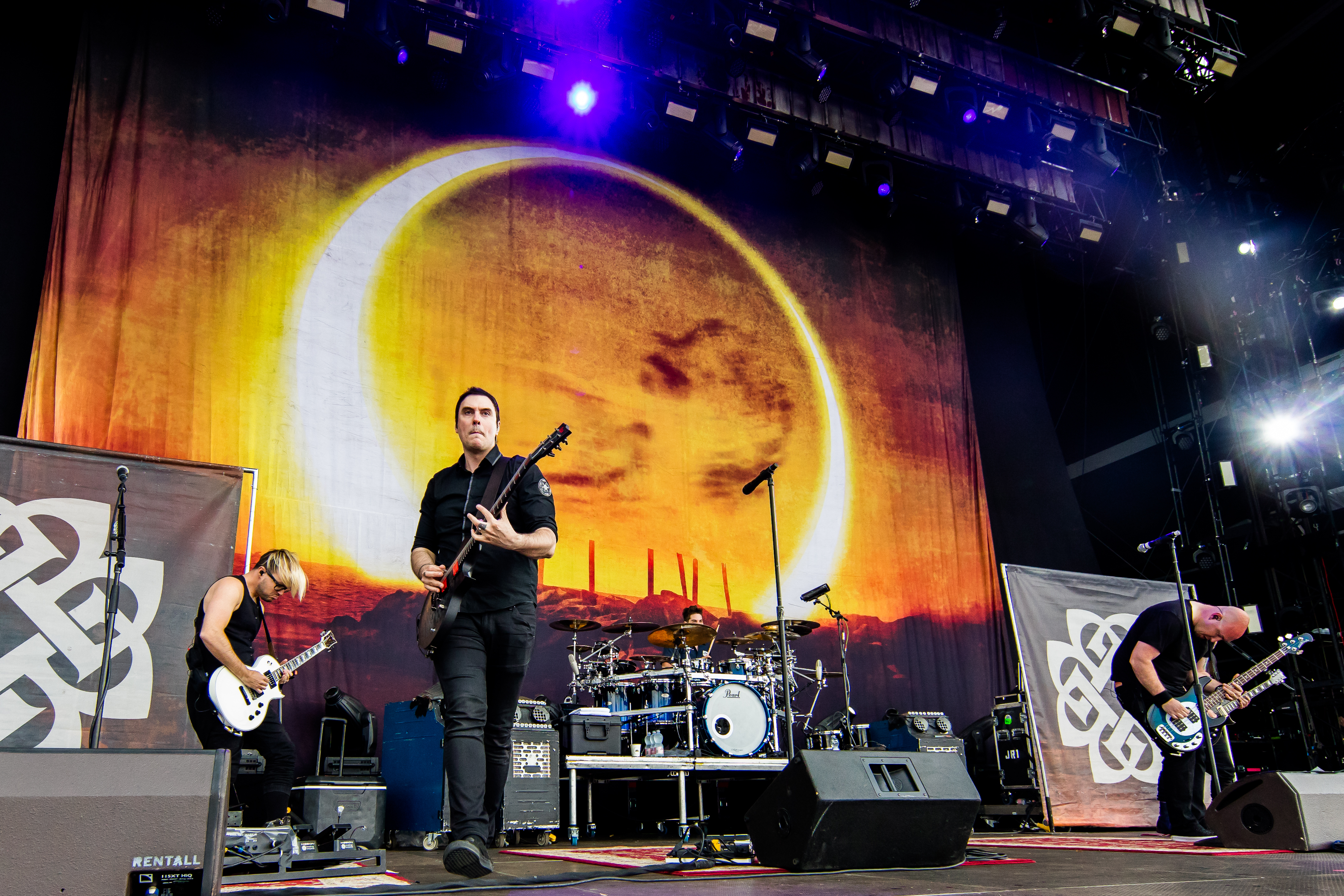
Breaking Benjamin performing at Rock am Ring in Germany 2016

The new lineup debuted with acoustic shows in late 2014, then went on a four-venue winter tour in the north-eastern United States. The band afterward announced 2015 spring, summer, and fall tour dates, supported by bands such as Young Guns and Starset. In July 2015, the band announced their first overseas performance, in which they headlined a four-day cruise venue in February 2016 along with Yngwie Malmsteen, Zakk Wylde, Flyleaf, and others. The band also performed on a joint U.S. tour with Shinedown in October and November along with Sevendust, and proceeded to play further outside of the United States in June 2016 at venues such as the Download Festival in the United Kingdom, Rock am Ring in Germany, and Nova Rock in Austria.

Burnley explained that writing for Dark Before Dawn was intermittent and fragmentary, taking place throughout the hiatus, though it was toward the end of the hiatus in 2013 when it became cohesive. After growing frustrated with the lack of answers regarding his health condition, Burnley decided to abandon searching for a diagnosis and focus on the album. Recorded and produced at a personal studio of Burnley's, Dark Before Dawn is the first album with the front man credited as the producer. Burnley stated that, "I would say that I did the same amount of producing on this album as I've done on other albums, just never had my name [on it]", adding, "You know, I'm not doing anything different here than I have done in the past. Why shouldn't I be known to be doing it?"

Within an hour of pre-order availability, Dark Before Dawn reached No. 1 on the rock albums chart on iTunes and No. 3 on the overall album chart. It sold 135,000 pure album units and 141,000 equivalent album units in its first week, debuting at No. 1 on the Billboard 200, making the album the group's heretofore most successful sales effort. It achieved gold certification on August 18, 2016. The disc's lead single "Failure" spent nine weeks at No. 1 on the Mainstream Rock Songs chart as well. Billboard's Jason Lipshutz felt the album's success was "eyebrow-raising", noting that, in addition to the band's lineup change, "135,000 in pure album sales is a hefty number in 2015—it's a bigger number than the respective bows of recent Madonna, ASAP Rocky, and Kelly Clarkson albums".

Joe DeTomaso, program director of active rock station WAQX-FM, stated, "They've always been a top-level band for the format, but not quite on the level of Disturbed or Shinedown or bands like that. They always seem to put out hit records without getting the kind of recognition that they deserved." Forbes's Hugh McIntyre writes that runner-up Tori Kelly's 75,000 copies "puts Breaking Benjamin's figures into perspective" and that despite "a pretty extensive lineup change, it looks like fans were awaiting their return with open arms".

The album was met with mostly positive critical reception, many critics praising the album for staying true to the group's sound, though others criticized it for sounding too similar to previous material. Dan Marsicano from About Entertainment stated, "Burnley could have made his creation just another dose of the glitzy, overproduced crap that is heard on every rock radio station in the world. Instead, Breaking Benjamin hardly deviate from the hooky jams that were present on Dear Agony." Conversely, AllMusic's James Monger felt that "it's hard to conceal the fact that most of these songs are nearly interchangeable with the band's older material." Revolver's Jeremy Borjon felt that "the music's true force only becomes apparent through deeper and repeated listenings, as the songs, on the surface, have a tendency to blend into one another".

=== Ember (2017–2018) ===
The group's sixth studio album was first revealed to be completed in August 2017. The band toured with Avenged Sevenfold and Bullet For My Valentine on their North American tour, following with a U.S. mini-tour with 10 Years, and then a tour with Five Finger Death Punch beginning in the second quarter of 2018. In December 2017, Ember and its lead single "Red Cold River" were announced for release in the second quarter of 2018 and January 5, 2018, respectively. On January 26, "Feed the Wolf" was released as a pre-order bonus, along with a release date for the album of April 13, 2018. Three subsequent songs—"Blood", "Psycho", and "Save Yourself"—were released ahead of the album as promotional releases. It sold 88,000 units in its first week of sales, debuting at No. 3 on the Billboard 200. "Red Cold River" peaked at No. 2 on the Mainstream Rock Songs chart, and No. 5 on the Hot Rock Songs chart.

Writing for the album began in 2016, with recording primarily happening in 2017. While Burnley remained the primary composer for the album, he stated that around half of it was written by the rest of the band. Burnley returned to producing for the album, along with the rest of the band, a first for the group. Rauch commented that the album pushes the boundaries with heavier material than the band's done in the past. He said "playing-wise, it's the most difficult album", and that they took advantage of the three-guitar player dynamic, but that the album nonetheless does not depart from Breaking Benjamin's established sound. Burnley explained that there was demand for heavier material from fans, and that the group was happy to reflect that. He later explained that he believed fans gravitated to the heavier side of the band, but that "we also make sure to explore our melodic and softer side too", saying that the album seeks to give both sides to the furthest degree.

Burnley stated that he chose Ember as the album title as something that could be the end of something or the start of it, but emphasized an intentional ambiguity to leave it open to interpretation. Official music videos were released for singles "Red Cold River", "Torn in Two", and "Tourniquet" on January 18, April 12, and December 13, respectively, with Burnley explaining that they are part of a three-part continuity. The music video for "Torn in Two" is a continuation of a narrative started by "Red Cold River", and features references to all of Breaking Benjamin's past music videos. "Tourniquet" concludes the trilogy as a sequel to both previous videos. Dancer and actor Derek Hough (who had previously covered "Ashes of Eden" in a choreographed music video) has an appearance on the album, saying that the opportunity was "a dream come true". Burnley later explained that he reached out to Hough after seeing his cover of "Ashes of Eden", and that the song he is featured on is "The Dark of You".

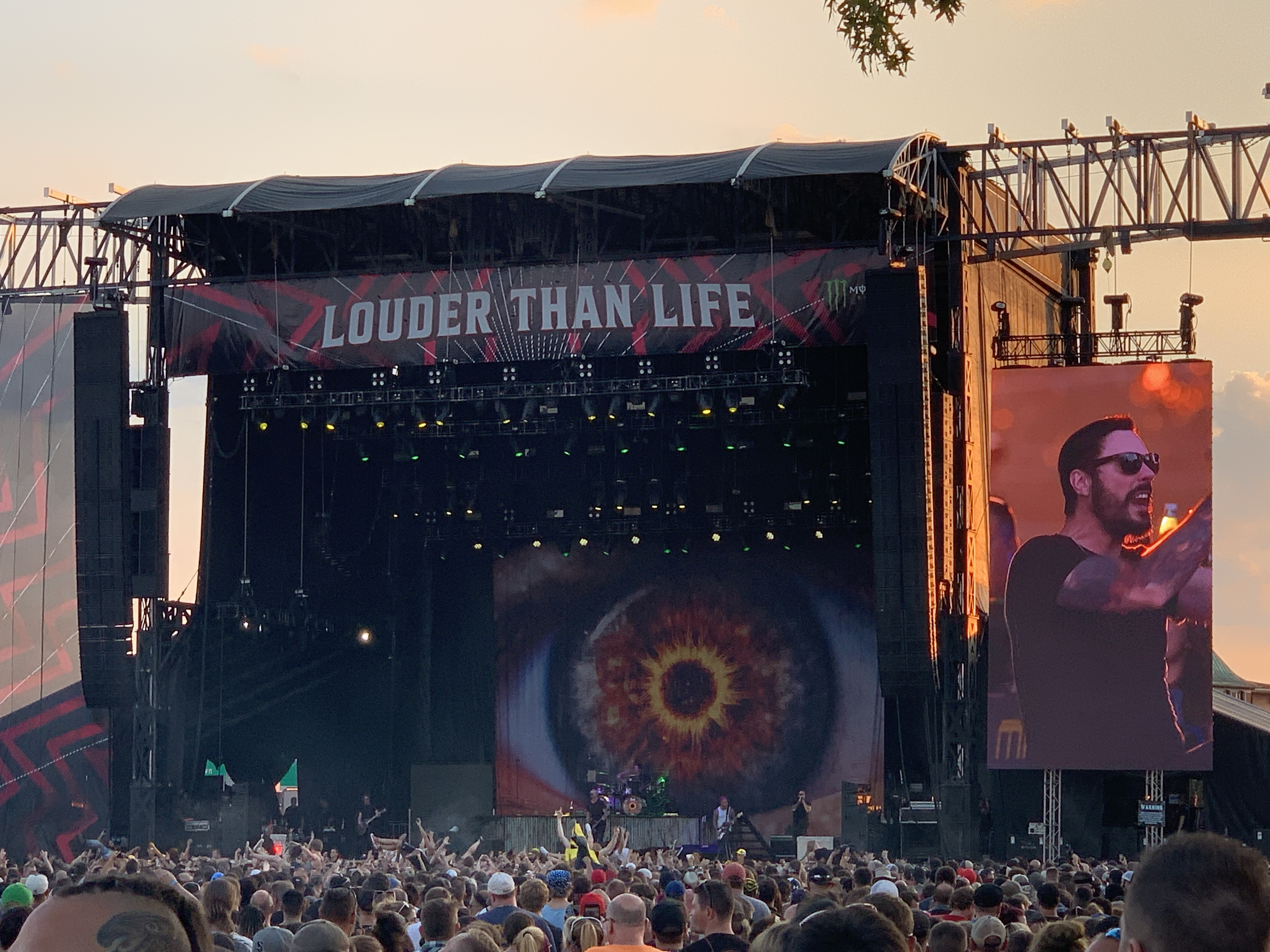
Breaking Benjamin performing at Louder Than Life in 2019

Ember received mostly positive critical reception, and was noted both for its familiarity and its heavier stylistic shift. AllMusic's Neil Yeung gave a generally favorable review but emphasized its familiarity, saying, "As far as variety goes, this is a fairly standard collection of tunes from a band that is mainly concerned with giving fans what they want and expect." Conversely, Loudwire's Chad Childers called Ember "a heavy record—not just in terms of sound where you could argue that they've never sounded heavier, but also in terms of lyrical content", saying the group is "proving that they're better (and yes, heavier) than ever with plenty still left to say".

Luke Nuttall of The Soundboard gave the album a mixed review, saying, "Even the most dedicated diehard has to admit that this is far from groundbreaking or any sort of departure from their past material, and such an unashamed recycling of work seldom leads to positive results", but adding, "Ember manages to elevate above radio-rock's most uninspired efforts, but this is purely for those who've been there all the way through; for everyone else, it's there to embrace or avoid as per want."

=== Aurora (2018–2022) ===
In an interview in December 2018, Burnley stated there will be an album of acoustic renditions of past songs in 2019. In July 2019, Burnley confirmed during a radio interview that the new acoustic album will feature collaborations from Red, Underoath, Saint Asonia, and Lacey Sturm.

The band's 2019 North American headline tour with Chevelle and Three Days Grace went from July 21 to September 25.

On October 28, 2019, the band officially announced the album Aurora via their official social media pages, with a release date of January 24, 2020. They also announced their 2020 co-headlining North American tour with Korn. On December 6, 2019, the band released "Far Away" featuring Scooter Ward of Cold, the first single from Aurora. On January 10, 2020, the band released an acoustic version of "Red Cold River" featuring Spencer Chamberlain of Underoath. In March 2020, they announced their summer 2020 tour, with Bush, Theory of a Deadman, Saint Asonia, and Cory Marks. On May 19, 2020, the band announced the cancellation of the tour due to the COVID-19 pandemic.

On July 10, 2020, the band released a cover of the Goo Goo Dolls' "Iris", with singer Diamante.

In September 2021, the band played US tour with Papa Roach and Memphis May Fire, in April-May 2022 - with Seether, Starset and Lacey Sturm.

In August 2022, the band released a collaborative song with Starset called "Waiting on the Sky to Change".

=== Touring and upcoming seventh studio album (2022–present) ===
From August through October 2022, Breaking Benjamin toured North America co-headlining with Alice in Chains and Bush as a special guest. The band toured with Bush in April and May 2023.

In a May 2023 interview, Jasen Rauch stated the band has been writing a new album "for a little over a year". In July 2023, Keith Wallen confirmed that the band was working on new music and that a release could happen within a year.

From July through September 2023, the band supported Disturbed in a North American tour alongside Jinjer. In 2024, the band played three tours: an acoustic tour in January supported by Keith Wallen, a tour in March-April with Daughtry and Catch Your Breath, and a fall co-headline tour with Staind (supported by Daughtry and Lakeview).

On October 15, 2024, Breaking Benjamin announced they had signed with BMG as their new record label. The next day, on October 16, the band released "Awaken", the first single off the upcoming seventh studio album.

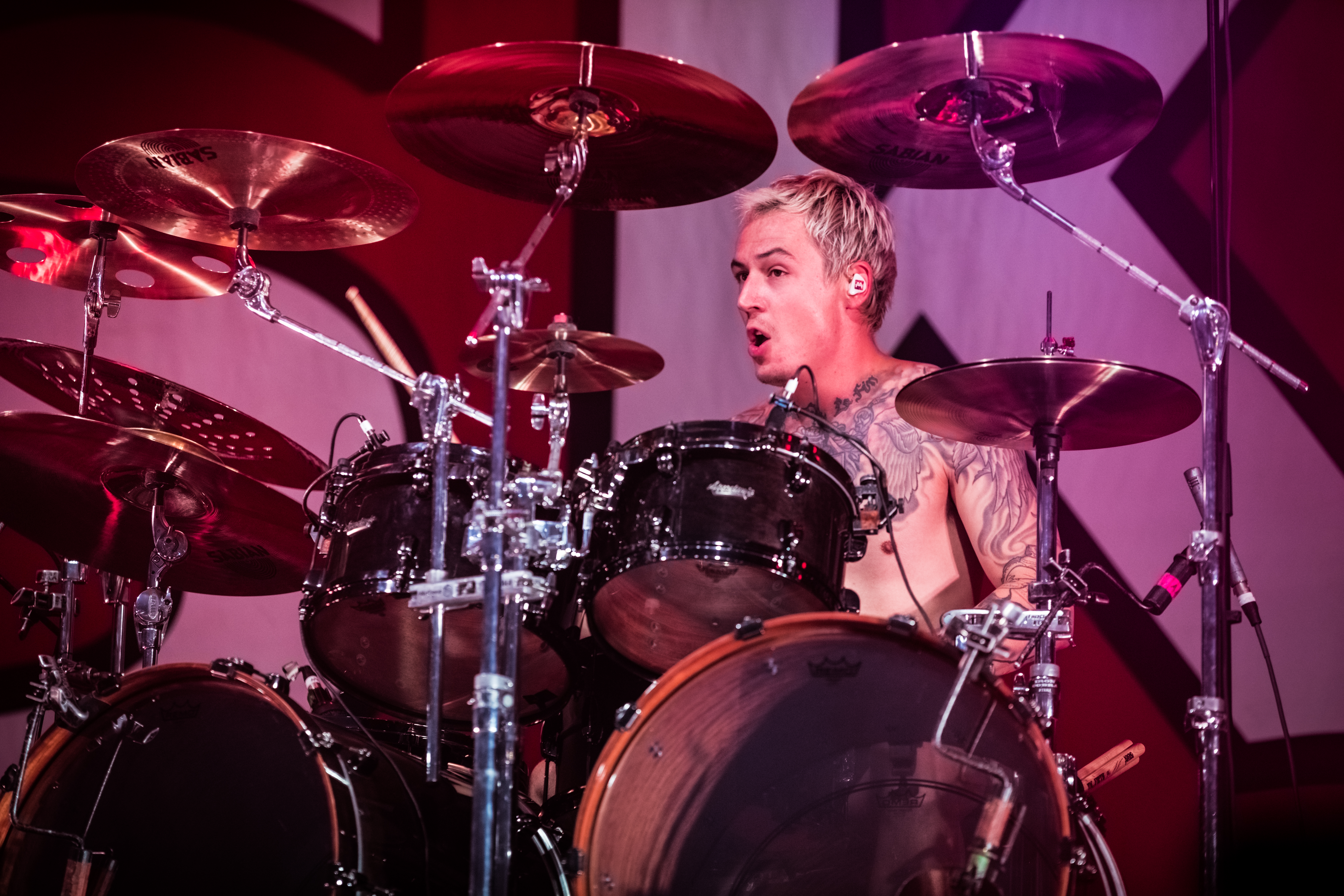
Asking Alexandria's James Cassells toured with Breaking Benjamin in 2025

On August 28, 2025, Shaun Foist announced he was stepping down from touring with Breaking Benjamin due to health issues, and that James Cassells of Asking Alexandria was hired as his substitute. Foist had been diagnosed with Hashimoto's disease in 2017, which flared up on their recent headlining tour with Staind and caused weakness in his legs. On December 9, Foist announced his departure from the band via Facebook. According to Foist, the band asked him to take a leave of absence to heal, which he accepted, but he voluntarily decided to make it permanent after seeing Cassells perform with the band. He also reasoned that the combination of the band moving in a more technical direction musically and his long recovery projection made him feel he was no longer physically a good fit in the band, though he made the decision without animosity.

From August to October of 2025, the band co-headlined a US tour with Three Days Grace, supported by Return to Dust.

On May 8, 2026, Breaking Benjamin thanked James Cassells for his duty, and welcomed Brian Medeiros (ex-Red, Otherwise) as their new touring drummer. The next day, Breaking Benjamin debuted a new song, titled "Something Wicked", at Welcome to Rockville festival, which was subsequently released as a single on May 13.

In June and July of 2026, the band toured Europe for the first time since 2017, supported by Chevelle; live events include festivals such as Rock Am Ring, Rock Im Park, Rock for People, Nova Rock, Hellfest, Graspop, as well as solo gigs in Hungary, Serbia, France, and Netherlands, among others. The band also announced a North American Tour for September and October of 2026, supported by Chevelle, Starset, and Kami Kehoe.

== Artistry ==
=== Musical style ===
"Into the Nothing"
"Into the Nothing" (Dear Agony) is an example of the band's recurrent formula involving "crunchy" guitars, swelling choruses, angst-heavy vocals, and tight construction.

Breaking Benjamin's musical style has been classified as hard rock, alternative rock, post-grunge, and alternative metal. (Note: However, the band's recurrent online biography written by AllMusic's Alex Henderson states of the alternative metal label, "Korn and Tool have also been cited as influences, but unlike Korn, Breaking Benjamin doesn't have strong hip-hop leanings and isn't quite alternative metal – hard alternative rock, certainly, but not quite alternative metal.") This approach has commonly been noted for its consistency; Corey Apar felt that "Breaking Benjamin are nothing if not consistent", and Alex Young felt that "Breaking Benjamin is one of the few modern rock bands on the radio that, if you have heard any song in its catalog prior, could be immediately recognized." Despite a complete lineup change prior to the release of Dark Before Dawn, Dan Marsicano stated, "Breaking Benjamin hardly deviate from the hooky jams that were present on Dear Agony. They have had an established sound since their breakout We Are Not Alone—hard-edged riffs with emotional upheaval—and that isn't tampered with on Dark Before Dawn."

Their style is described by Apar as "mixing heavy hard rock dynamics with a moody demeanor that never slips into full-on dejection". Spence D. characterizes the band as "[persisting] in delivering crunching guitars topped off with somewhat generic, angst-ridden [lyrics] that waffle between being plaintive and aggressive" with vocals that "[deliver] just the right amount of emotion, fluctuating between contemplative subjectivity and growling anger". Young felt that Breaking Benjamin is "indicative of early '00s modern rock, while also now and then being more Filter-esque or technically proficient, primarily on guitar during 2002's Saturate, and from then on, with bass and drums".

In a 2020 piece in The Wall Street Journal, Chris Kornelis described the band's style as "a subgenre of rock 'n' roll, often called 'active rock'. ... The genre includes bands like Disturbed, Five Finger Death Punch, and Three Days Grace, hard rockers who growl and yell, but can be as tender and emotive as Coldplay".

=== Composition ===
Burnley is the primary songwriter in the band. Music industry attorney and author Martin Frascogna writes that "it's unmistakably clear that Burnley started the group, is the creative force behind the group and essentially dictates the group's decisions". Bands such as Nirvana, Live, Bush, Pearl Jam, Stone Temple Pilots, and The Beatles have been cited as influences. Burnley remarked in 2009 that while the other band members did contribute, it was "always left up to [him] to put all the pieces together and make it so that it's even anything at all". However, Burnley considered Rauch to be his "writing partner" during Dear Agony and stated that he looked forward to writing with him in the future.

After joining the band in 2014 as part of the new lineup, Rauch provided writing contributions on Dark Before Dawn, writing the intro and outro tracks as well as riffs on two other tracks. Burnley revealed in 2015 that the whole band would write songs for Breaking Benjamin in the future, saying, "It just so happens that when they came on board for this album, I was already 95 percent done. I'm really looking forward to writing the next one all together." The 2018 album Ember represents the band's first effort with full composition credit given to members other than Burnley.

Breaking Benjamin's lyrical content evolved as a product of Burnley's sobriety, the frontman noting that the lyricism in Dear Agony is more thought out. Rito Asilo of the Inquirer writes that Burnley "owes the improved clarity and coherence in Breaking Benjamin's music to sobriety". Burnley has said that before sobriety, anything that made sense thematically was a coincidence and that he would take shots if he were dissatisfied with a lyric. Breaking Benjamin's lyrics have been noted for their vague, angst-heavy themes. Burnley has said, "I try to keep my writing vague so people can draw their own conclusions."

=== Live performance ===
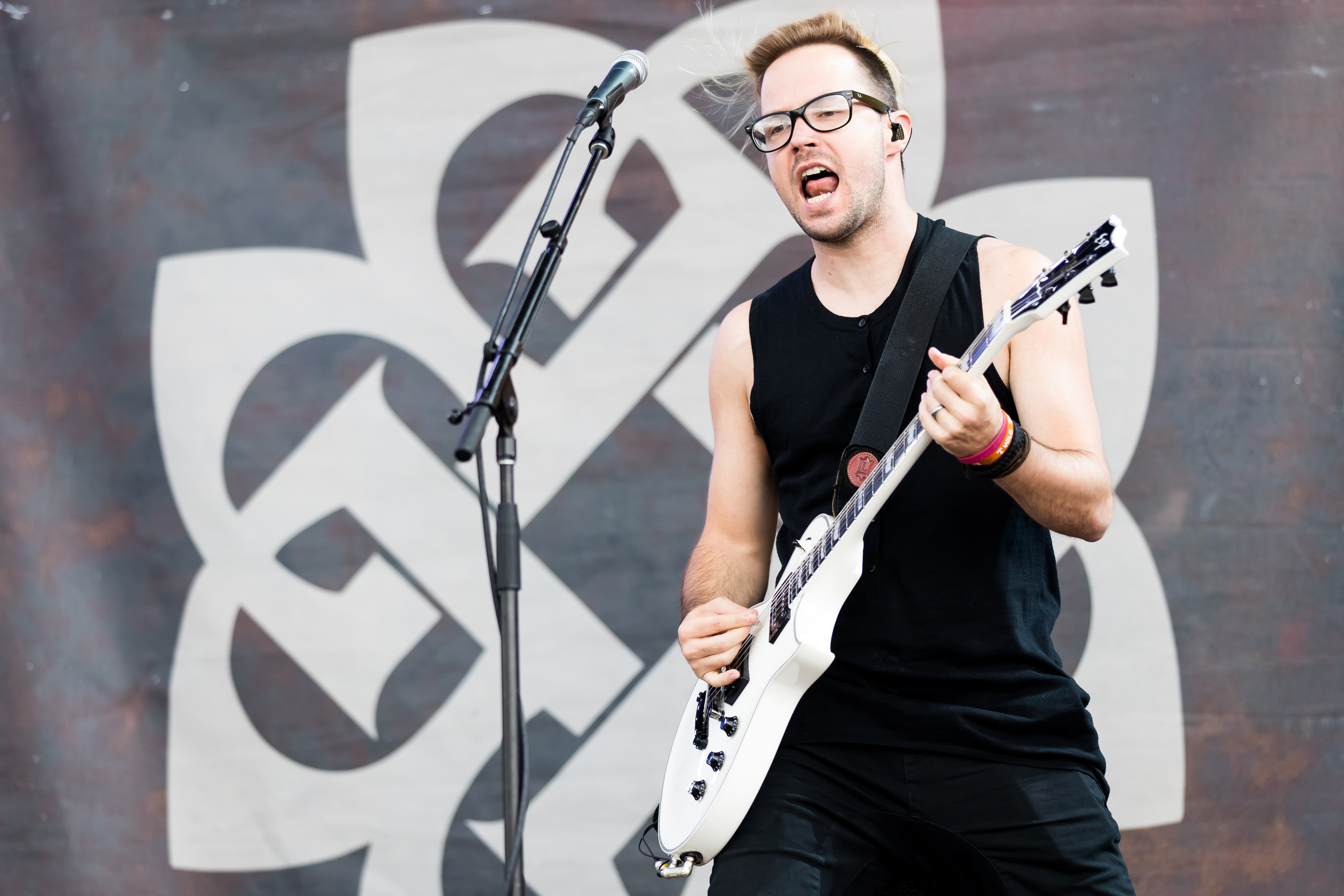
Rhythm guitarist and vocalist Keith Wallen performing in 2016

Breaking Benjamin's live sound has corresponded with lineup arrangements. The band originally lacked backing vocalists and tertiary instrumentation, requiring them to rely on pre-recorded tracks during live performances. However, the band was noted for a change in such respects with the second iteration of the band assembled in 2014. Bruch and Wallen were selected in part for their ability as singers, providing all backing vocals on both new studio recordings and during live shows.

Burnley noted that it was important to add two new singers in order to replicate vocal techniques such as three-part harmonies, octave range, and layered vocals. Rauch, acting as a third guitarist, provides the band with "more freedom while simultaneously thickening up their live sound", as some songs feature three guitar parts or layered guitars or are meant to feature Burnley only performing vocals, such as "I Will Not Bow" and "Lights Out". Foist utilized Roland V-Kit electronic drums during live performances and triggered certain sounds as heard in studio recordings, such as the piano notes in "Breakdown". Additionally, Rauch is equipped with a Roland GR-55 guitar synthesizer allowing him to play orchestral strings and choir sound effects, further eliminating any reliance on pre-recorded tracks.

Breaking Benjamin is known for frequent live collaborations with co-touring musicians, including David Draiman (Disturbed), Adam Gontier (Saint Asonia and Three Days Grace), Shaun Morgan (Seether), Dustin Bates (Starset), Morgan Rose (Sevendust), Chris Motionless (Motionless in White), and Jared Dines. Benjamin Burnley himself joins co-touring bands for a guest appearance, having performed with Alice in Chains, Chevelle, and Evans Blue among others. The band also occasionally brings fans on stage to perform with them.

The band rarely tours outside North America due to Burnley's fear of flying; for the band's 2026 tour in Europe, Burnley would travel to Europe by boat, setting off a week earlier than the rest of the band.

== Band members ==
Breaking Benjamin live at Frequency Festival 2017

Benjamin Burnley

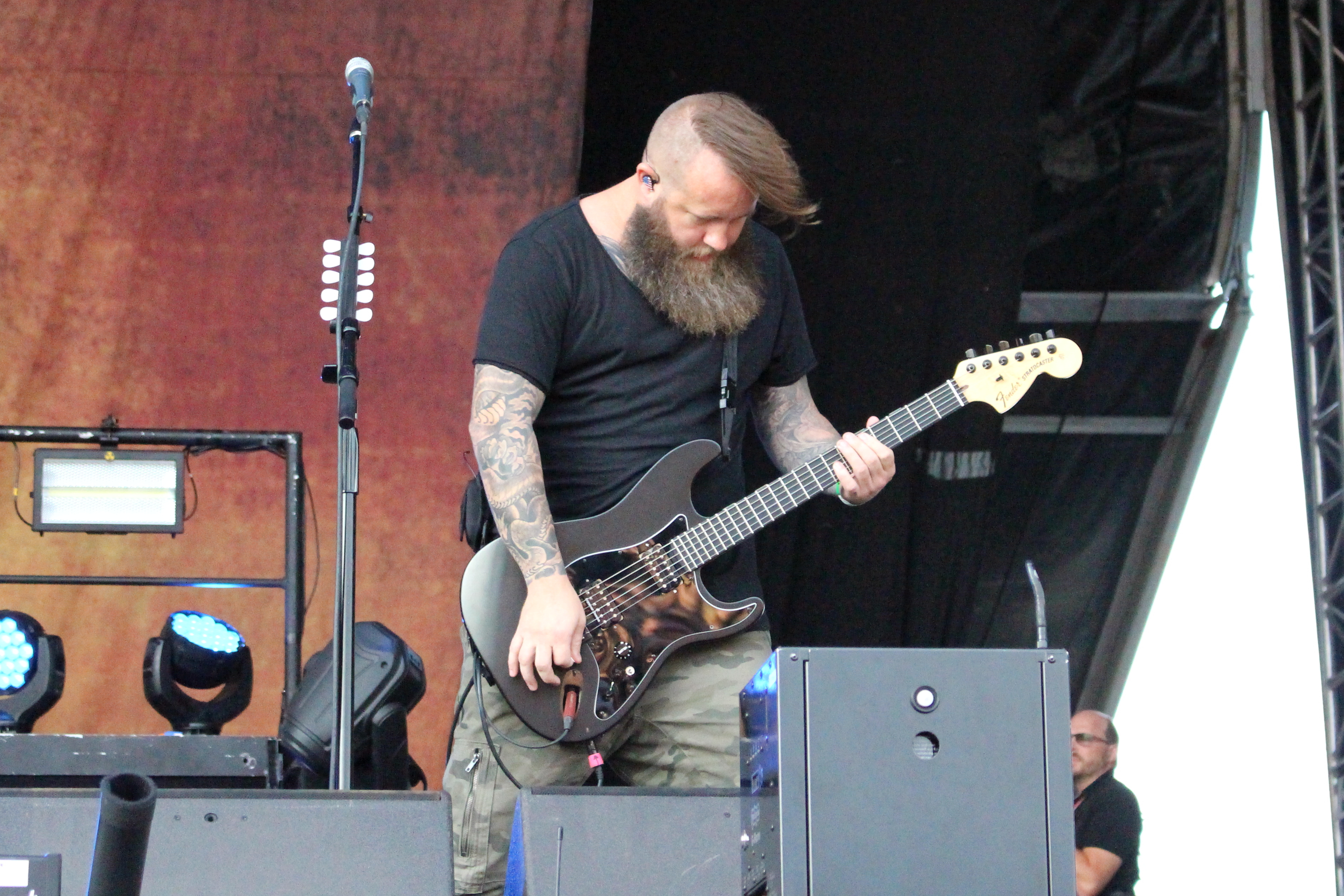
Jasen Rauch

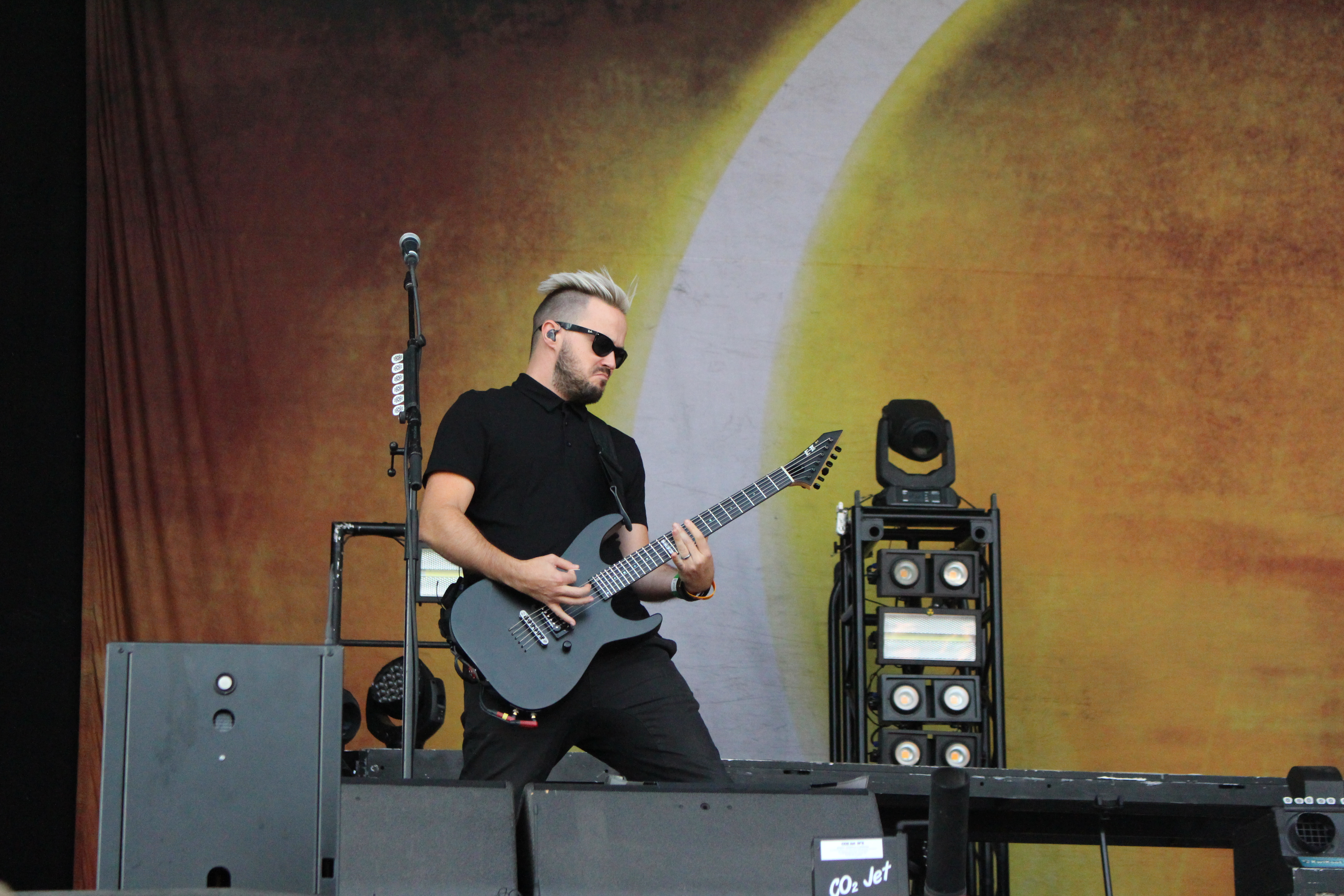
Keith Wallen

Aaron Bruch

Current

- Benjamin Burnley – lead vocals, rhythm guitar (1999–2010, 2014–present), lead guitar (1999–2002)
- Jasen Rauch – lead guitar, programming (2014–present)
- Keith Wallen – rhythm guitar, backing vocals (2014–present)
- Aaron Bruch – bass, backing vocals (2014–present)

Current touring musicians

- Brian Medeiros – drums (2026–present)

Former

- Jeremy Hummel – drums (1999–2004)
- Jason Davoli – bass (1999)
- Jonathan "Bug" Price – bass (2001)
- Aaron Fink – lead guitar (2002–2010)
- Mark James Klepaski – bass (2002–2010)
- Chad Szeliga – drums (2005–2010)
- Shaun Foist – drums, programming (2014–2025)

Former touring musicians

- Kevin Soffera – drums (2004)
- Ben "BC" Vaught – drums (2004–2005)
- James Cassells – drums (2025–2026)

Timeline

== Discography ==
Studio albums

- Saturate (2002)
- We Are Not Alone (2004)
- Phobia (2006)
- Dear Agony (2009)
- Dark Before Dawn (2015)
- Ember (2018)
