= Chad Szeliga =

American drummer (born 1976)

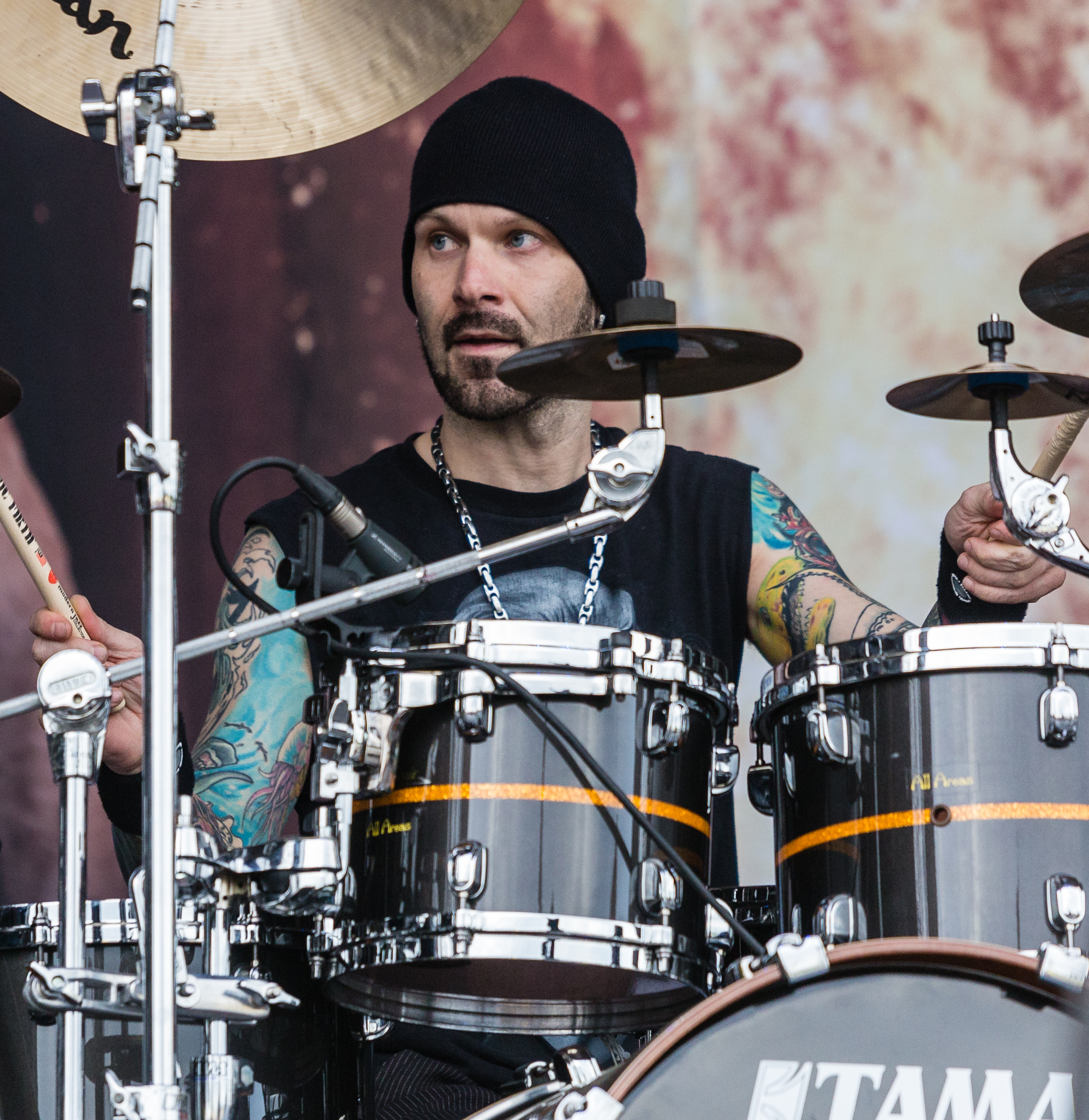
- Szeliga performing with Black Star Riders at Nova Rock 2017

Background information
- Born: December 23, 1976 (age 49)
- Genres: Heavy metal; post-grunge; hard rock; jazz; jazz fusion; gospel; funk; hip-hop; bebop
- Occupation: Drummer
- Years active: 1999–present
- Label: Hollywood

Chad Szeliga (born December 23, 1976) is an American drummer from Elyria, Ohio. Formerly the drummer of rock band Breaking Benjamin, he joined Black Label Society in 2013, replacing Mike Froedge. In 2017, Szeliga replaced Jimmy DeGrasso in Black Star Riders, leaving the band in 2021. He currently drums for Pennsylvania band Turning the Tide. Szeliga cites Vinnie Colaiuta, John Bonham, Steve Gadd, Dennis Chambers, Tony Williams, Manu Katché, Stewart Copeland and Neil Peart as his main influences.

== Career ==
=== Breaking Benjamin ===
While with Another Path, Szeliga recorded an audition video for Breaking Benjamin playing drums for the song "So Cold". The video submitted happened to be the only VHS tape submitted. Ben Burnley was forced to borrow a VCR from his neighbor to view the tape. After Burnley reviewed the tape, the band decided he was the right guy for the job. His first official recording with the band was for the full-band version of the song "Rain" from We Are Not Alone in mid-2005, which was sent to modern radio, and later appeared on the band's cover of Queen's "Who Wants to Live Forever". He recorded with Breaking Benjamin on their 2006 album Phobia, which was released on August 8, 2006. He also joined the band on their tour supporting that album.

Szeliga also performed on 2009's Dear Agony, which cemented more platinum success for the band.

Szeliga left Breaking Benjamin in April 2013 due to creative differences with frontman Ben Burnley and notified his fans via a Facebook post on April 22, 2013.

=== Other ventures ===
While in Breaking Benjamin, Chad was active in multiple local bands in the Scranton area including OurAfter with Current Breaking Benjamin Bass Player Aaron Bruch.

He went on to drum with Black Label Society until 2014 and also recorded and toured briefly with Creed frontman Scott Stapp.

On May 5, 2017, Szeliga was announced as the new drummer for Black Star Riders, replacing Jimmy DeGrasso.

In 2018, Szeliga announced the start of a new project, Walking with Lions, in collaboration with guitarist Kevin Hicklin of 3 by Design. In 2020, it was announced that Szeliga had joined rock act Weapons of Anew sometime after the release of their debut album, replacing Chris Manfre.

Szeliga currently plays with the band Turning the Tide.

== Equipment ==
As of July 2020, Szeliga endorses Tama Drums, Evans drumheads, Paiste cymbals, Vater Percussion drumsticks, and Audimute. He largely uses the Starclassic Performer Bubinga series as well as the new line of Tama's S.L.P Dynamic Kapur kit and has a tendency to put the mid rack tom to the left of his kit preceding the high rack tom, claiming that it encourages him to be more creative with his fills. His previous endorsements were Yamaha Drums, DW Drums, Vic Firth drumsticks Remo drumheads and Zildjian cymbals.

Drums: Tama Starclassic Performer Bubinga in blue nebula blaze:

- 22"x18" bass drum
- 8"x6" rack tom
- 10"x6.5" rack tom
- 12"x7" rack tom
- 14"x12" floor tom
- 16"x14" floor tom
- 13"x7" starphonic steel snare.

Cymbals: Paiste:

- RUDE 14" hi-hats
- Formula 602 Modern Essentials 10" splash
- 2002 5.5" cup chime
- Masters 17" dark crash
- Masters 18" dark crash
- Signature 6" splash
- Signature Dark Energy 8" mark 1 splash
- RUDE 20" mega bell ride (custom made in purple colorsound finish)
- PST X 14" swiss flanger stack
- Formula 602 Modern Essentials 19" crash
- 2002 19" wild china.

Cymbals circa 2019:

- RUDE 14" hi-hats
- Signature Dark Energy 8" mark l splash
- Signature 6" splash
- Signature Dark Energy 17" mark l crash
- Signature Dark Energy 18" mark l crash
- 2002 5.5" cup chime
- 2002 6" cup chime
- Signature 22" blue bell ride
- PST X 14" swiss flanger stack
- Signature Dark Energy 19" mark l crash
- Masters 22" swish.

== Discography ==
With Breaking Benjamin

- We Are Not Alone (full-band version of "Rain" only) (2004)
- Phobia (2006)
- Dear Agony (2009)

With Black Label Society

- Catacombs of the Black Vatican (2014)

With Switched

- Subject to Change (2002)
- Ghosts in the Machine (2006)

With Forever Oeuvre

- EP Unfinished (2008)

With Casey Honig

- Tragic Uprise EP (2016)

With Sworn II Silence

- Sworn II Silence (2003)

With Black Star Riders

- Another State of Grace (2019)

With DRAGONFLY EFFECT

- "INFECTED" (single – drums) (2023) – Article

With Turning the Tide

- Turning The Tide (2026)
