= Ember (album) =

Studio album by Breaking Benjamin
- Released: April 13, 2018
- Recorded: 2017
- Studios: 301 3rd St. Studios (Ocean City, New Jersey); The Barbershop Studios (Hopatcong, New Jersey)
- Genres: Alternative metal; nu metal; hard rock; post-grunge
- Length: 38:45
- Label: Hollywood
- Producers: Benjamin Burnley; Keith Wallen; Aaron Bruch; Jasen Rauch

Breaking Benjamin chronology
Dark Before Dawn (2015)	Ember (2018)	Aurora (2020)

Singles from Ember
- 1. "Red Cold River" Released: January 5, 2018; 2. "Torn in Two" Released: April 13, 2018; 3. "Tourniquet" Released: December 18, 2018

Ember is the sixth studio album by American rock band Breaking Benjamin, produced by lead singer and rhythm guitarist Benjamin Burnley. It was released by Hollywood Records on April 13, 2018. The first single, "Red Cold River", was released on January 5, 2018. A music video for "Torn in Two" was released on the same day as the album, and was released as the second single on May 29, 2018. On December 13, 2018, a music video for "Tourniquet" was released, and was released as the third single on December 18, 2018. This is the band's last studio album with Hollywood Records before signing with BMG.

== Background and recording ==
After a string of successful platinum-selling albums in the US throughout the 2000s, the band went into a hiatus shortly after their 2009 album Dear Agony while frontman Benjamin Burnley dealt with a recurring, long-term illness. The break ended up being an extended one, with Burnley later taking former band members guitarist Aaron Fink and bassist Mark James Klepaski to court over making unauthorized decisions without his consent on the band's 2011 greatest hits album Shallow Bay: The Best of Breaking Benjamin. Burnley won the case, retained the rights to the band and its namesake, and later reformed the band in 2014. Material for the band's next album, which was 2015's Dark Before Dawn, was written almost entirely by Burnley, who, towards the end, reformed an entirely new lineup for the band – Jasen Rauch (guitar), Keith Wallen (guitar), Aaron Bruch (bass), and Shaun Foist (drums). Towards the end of the sessions, the band decided to collaborate on a song, which ended up becoming the track "Never Again". The collaboration ended up being such a positive experience that Burnley decided to involve the entire band in the writing process for their next studio album, Ember.

Writing for the album began in 2016, with recording primarily happening in 2017 and with Burnley producing. In August 2017, Burnley and Foist announced that the album had been recorded and submitted to their record label, with its release date pending the label's feedback. Dancer and actor Derek Hough (who had previously covered "Ashes of Eden" in a choreographed music video) has an appearance on the track "The Dark of You", saying that the opportunity was "a dream come true". Burnley later explained that he reached out to Hough after seeing his cover of "Ashes of Eden".

Burnley jokingly stated that the album was originally supposed to be titled Ass-End, a pun on the word "ascend", but the record label expressed displeasure with his idea.

== Composition and themes ==
Rauch has commented that the album pushes the boundaries with heavier material than the band's past albums, and that "playing-wise, it's the most difficult album". He also noted that the album takes advantage of the three-guitar player dynamic, but still remains consistent with the band's established sound. Burnley stated that the album's sound moved into a heavier direction, something that was inspired from fan demand for a heavier album, a direction the band was happy to move into anyway. He later described it as an album of extremes, stating that "the heavy side is really heavy" but that "the softer side on this album is really soft" as well.

== Release and promotion ==
Burnley first mentioned Ember as the album's name in October 2017, with a more formal and widespread announcement, along with a tentative release date of the second quarter of 2018 occurring in December 2017, later confirmed to be on April 13, 2018. The album's first single, "Red Cold River" was released on January 5, 2018, with a music video later released two weeks later on January 18. After two weeks, the song had peaked at number five on the Billboard Hot Rock Songs chart, and number 21 the Billboard Mainstream Rock Songs chart. The band released a string of promotional songs prior to the album's release, including "Feed the Wolf" on January 25, 2018, "Blood" on February 22, "Psycho" on March 23, and "Save Yourself" on April 5. "Torn in Two" was released alongside a music video on the album's release date, April 13, and was sent to radio as the album's second official single on May 29. On December 13, the band released their music video for the song "Tourniquet". On December 18, 2018, "Tourniquet" was released as their third single.

To promote the album's release, they embarked on a North American tour with Avenged Sevenfold and Bullet for My Valentine in early 2018. They followed up this tour by embarking on a co-headlining tour with Five Finger Death Punch, supported by Nothing More and Bad Wolves.

== Reception ==
=== Critical reception ===
Professional ratings
Review scores
Source	Rating
AllMusic	3/5 stars
Loudwire	Positive
Metal Injection	7.5/10

Ember was well received. AllMusic was generally positive about the album, comparing it favorably to the work of Chevelle, Disturbed, and Shinedown and concluding that "As far as variety goes, this is a fairly standard collection of tunes from a band that is mainly concerned with giving fans what they want and expect." Loudwire was also positive in regards to the album, referring to it as part of "an impressive second act" for the band, alongside Dark Before Dawn, after the band's legal troubles in the early 2010s, and concluded it showed that "they're better (and yes, heavier) than ever with plenty still left to say." They later named it the sixth best hard rock album of 2018. Metal Injection also favored the album positively, calling it "one of their most mature works yet", and a "refreshing change of pace."

=== Commercial performance ===
Ember debuted at number three on the US Billboard 200, selling 88,000 copies in its first week. As of August 28, 2019, the album has sold around 170,000 copies in the United States. In September 2018, "Torn in Two" topped the Billboard Mainstream Rock Songs chart, outperforming the album's first single, "Red Cold River", which peaked at number two on the chart.

== Track listing ==
No.	Title	Writer(s)	Producer(s)	Length
1.	"Lyra" (intro)	Benjamin Burnley	Burnley	0:29
2.	"Feed the Wolf"	Burnley; Keith Wallen; Aaron Bruch; Jasen Rauch; Shaun Foist	Burnley; Bruch	3:18
3.	"Red Cold River"	Burnley; Wallen; Bruch; Rauch	Burnley; Bruch; Rauch	3:20
4.	"Tourniquet"	Burnley; Wallen; Bruch; Rauch; Foist	Burnley; Wallen	4:09
5.	"Psycho"	Burnley; Wallen; Bruch; Rauch; Foist	Burnley; Rauch	3:20
6.	"The Dark of You" (featuring Derek Hough)	Burnley; Rauch	Burnley; Rauch	4:12
7.	"Down"	Burnley	Burnley	4:02
8.	"Torn in Two"	Burnley	Burnley	4:17
9.	"Blood"	Burnley; Wallen; Bruch; Rauch; Foist	Burnley; Bruch; Rauch	3:09
10.	"Save Yourself"	Burnley	Burnley	3:06
11.	"Close Your Eyes"	Burnley; Wallen; Bruch; Rauch; Foist	Burnley; Wallen; Bruch; Rauch	4:01
12.	"Vega" (outro)	Rauch	Rauch	1:22
Total length:				38:45

== Personnel ==
Credits adapted from album's liner notes.

Breaking Benjamin

- Benjamin Burnley – lead vocals, rhythm guitar
- Jasen Rauch – lead guitar
- Keith Wallen – rhythm guitar, backing vocals
- Aaron Bruch – bass, backing vocals
- Shaun Foist – drums

Additional musicians

- Derek Hough – backing vocals on "The Dark of You"

Technical

- Breaking Benjamin – engineering, digital editing
- John Bender – engineering, digital editing
- Ben Grosse – mixing at The Mix Room, Burbank, California
- Paul Pablo – mixing assistant
- Ted Jensen – mastering at Sterling Sound, New York City, New York
- Justin Shturtz – mastering assistant

Artwork

- Tom Jermann for t42design – art direction and design
- Mat Giordano for Posture Interactive – cover art, co-direction, and production design
- Christopher Yankton – band photography

Management

- Chris Nilsson and JoJo Benton – exclusive worldwide management at 10th Street Entertainment
- Ryan Harlacher – booking for Creative Artists Agency
- Lesley DiPietro (Creative Artists Agency) and Bryan Raisa (10th Street Entertainment) – tour marketing
- Linc Wheeler, Steve Sherr, Ken Bunt, Robbie Snow, Buddy Deal, Scot Finck, Dominic Griffin, Mio Tinajero, Scott Pappas, Rob Souriall, Lillian Matulic – worldwide label (Hollywood Records)

== Charts ==
=== Weekly charts ===
Weekly chart performance for Ember
Chart (2018)	Peak position
Australian Albums (ARIA)	9
Austrian Albums (Ö3 Austria)	10
Belgian Albums (Ultratop Flanders)	102
Canadian Albums (Billboard)	4
Dutch Albums (Album Top 100)	59
German Albums (Offizielle Top 100)	6
New Zealand Albums (RMNZ)	25
Norwegian Albums (VG-lista)	28
Swedish Albums (Sverigetopplistan)	37
Scottish Albums (Official Charts)	18
Swiss Albums (Schweizer Hitparade)	16
UK Albums (Official Charts)	35
UK Rock & Metal Albums (OCC)	2
US Billboard 200	3
US Top Alternative Albums (Billboard)	1
US Top Rock Albums (Billboard)	1
US Top Hard Rock Albums (Billboard)	1

=== Year-end charts ===
Year-end chart performance for Ember
Chart (2018)	Position
US Top Album Sales (Billboard)	72
US Top Current Album Sales (Billboard)	62
US Top Alternative Albums (Billboard)	26
US Top Rock Albums (Billboard)	50
US Top Hard Rock Albums (Billboard)	17
