= Picture Me Broken =

American rock band

- Origin: Redwood City, California, U.S.
- Genres: Emo; screamo; post-hardcore; emo pop; hard rock; metalcore
- Years active: 2005–2014 (on hiatus)
- Labels: Megaforce; StandBy
- Members: Layla Brooklyn Allman; Dante Phoenix
- Past members: Austin Dunn; Shaun Foist; Eric Perkins; Will Escher; Nick Loiacono; Connor Lung
- Website: Official Facebook page

Picture Me Broken is an American rock band originating from Redwood City, California, but is now located in Southern California. They have released two EPs and one album. They were named in 2009 as one of the top unsigned bands by PureVolume, and won an MTV Video Music Award in 2009 for Best Breakout Bay Area Artist. The band has been on hiatus from touring since 2014.

== History ==
Picture Me Broken was formed in 2005 by lead singer and keyboardist Layla Brooklyn Allman and bassist Austin Dunn. The band was originally called 'Lane Four' with 'Lane' reflecting the first initial of the original four band members (Layla, Austin, Nick, and Eric). After several member changes and evolving style, the band settled into its new name, Picture Me Broken. With early performances consisting of covers, the band now performs its own songs and has had several releases.

In December 2012, the band released a 4-song EP (Mannequins), produced by David Bendeth.

Picture Me Broken was the sole opening act for the Alice Cooper / Marilyn Manson Masters of Madness – Shock Therapy nationwide tour during June–July 2013.

== Band members ==
Current members

- Layla Brooklyn Allman – vocals, keyboards (2005–2014)
- Dante Phoenix – guitars (2010–2014)

Former members

- Eric Perkins – drums (2005–2009)
- Nick Loiacono – lead guitar (2005–2010)
- Austin Dunn – bass (2005–2013)
- Will Escher – rhythm guitar (2006–2010)
- Connor Lung – drums (2009–2012)
- Shaun Foist – drums (2012–2013)
- Jimmy Strimpel – guitars (2011–2014)

Guest performances

- Tyler Bush – vocals (from the band Ten Days New, sings a secondary lead vocal on "Echoes of an Empire", which appears on Wide Awake)

== Discography ==
=== Music videos ===
- "Live Forever" (2009)
- "Dearest (I'm So Sorry)" (2010)
- "Darwin's song" (2010)
- "Torture" (2013)
- "Mannequins" (2013)

=== Albums ===
- Wide Awake (2010)

=== EP ===
- Dearest, I'm So Sorry (2009)
- Mannequins (2012)

=== Singles ===
- "Crazy On You" (2011)
- "Dependency" (2012)
