= Never Again (Breaking Benjamin song) =

Single by Breaking Benjamin

from the album Dark Before Dawn
- Released: January 20, 2017
- Recorded: 2015
- Genre: Heavy metal; hard rock
- Length: 3:43
- Label: Hollywood
- Songwriters: Benjamin Burnley; Jasen Rauch; Keith Wallen
- Producer: Benjamin Burnley

Breaking Benjamin singles chronology
"Ashes of Eden" (2016)	"Never Again" (2017)	"Red Cold River" (2018)

Music video
- "Never Again" on YouTube

"Never Again" is a song by American rock band Breaking Benjamin, released on January 20, 2017 as the fifth single on the band's fifth studio album Dark Before Dawn. The song topped the Billboard Mainstream Rock Songs chart in 2017, the third song from the album to do so, behind "Failure" and "Angels Fall".

== Background ==
The song was written during the sessions for Breaking Benjamin's 2015 album release Dark Before Dawn, which saw frontman Benjamin Burnley reforming the band after a multi-year hiatus with an entirely new lineup. While Burnley states that he ended up writing 95% percent of the album alone prior to recruiting the new band lineup, "Never Again" was one of the album's few collaborative songs, and the only song to feature input from all members of the new lineup. Newly recruited guitarist Jasen Rauch came in to help Burnley finish the track, writing the song's guitar riff himself, and collaborating on the song's bridge with Burnley.

== Music video ==
The band first teased a release of a music video for the song on January 9, 2017, before officially releasing it on January 13, 2017. The music video involves a group of three friends who get addicted to a fictional drug from a tree that prevents aging. While initially enjoying the effects, one friend takes too much from the tree at once, causing the tree to die. When discovered, a fight ensues with the friend who killed the tree leaving. In the end, all three eventually succumb to their fate and turn to dust dying peacefully.

== Composition and themes ==
The song was described as similar to some of the band's prior music, as a mix of heavy metal and hard rock, and having a "wonderful dynamic between softer melody driven choruses, the hard-edged crunch of Burnley's guitar and the dirty backing vocals."

== Personnel ==
- Benjamin Burnley – lead vocals, rhythm guitar
- Jasen Rauch – lead guitar
- Keith Wallen – rhythm guitar, backing vocals
- Aaron Bruch – bass, backing vocals
- Shaun Foist – drums

== Charts ==
Chart (2016)	Peak position
US Mainstream Rock (Billboard)	1
US Rock & Alternative Airplay (Billboard)	16
US Hot Rock & Alternative Songs (Billboard)	28
