= Tourniquet (Breaking Benjamin song) =

Single by Breaking Benjamin

from the album Ember
- Released: December 18, 2018
- Recorded: 2017
- Genre: Hard rock
- Length: 4:09
- Label: Hollywood
- Songwriters: Benjamin Burnley; Keith Wallen; Aaron Bruch; Jasen Rauch; Shaun Foist
- Producers: Benjamin Burnley; Keith Wallen; Aaron Bruch; Jasen Rauch

Breaking Benjamin singles chronology
"Torn in Two" (2018)	"Tourniquet" (2018)	"Far Away" (2019)

Music video
- "Tourniquet" on YouTube

"Tourniquet" is a song by American rock band Breaking Benjamin. It was their third single off of their album Ember. The band made a video for the single, completing a trilogy of videos for the singles from the album.

== Reception ==
The Daily Cardinal described the song as "a welcome and natural progression from their earlier works, signaling a very promising future for a band that is now two decades old" and that it features "a driving bass heavy drum line, a beautiful blending of tones and a textbook example of Burnley's vocal prowess, it stands as a gem of modern hard rock". In a fairly negative review, The Heights said: "Flutters of electric guitar notes cut through the saturated quality of the song's heavy instrumentation, and the raspy screams of the chorus have a ringing, auto-tuned quality that give the song a much-needed, distinguishable melody." MTSU Sidelines said the band "blend heavy intros and bridges with verses that build up to melodic choruses" with this song.

== Charts ==
Chart (2018–19)	Peak position
US Hot Rock & Alternative Songs (Billboard)	44
US Rock & Alternative Airplay (Billboard)	24
