= We Are Not Alone (Breaking Benjamin album) =

2004 studio album by Breaking Benjamin

Studio album by Breaking Benjamin
- Released: June 29, 2004
- Recorded: October 2003 – January 2004
- Studio: Mirror Image Studios (Anaheim, California)
- Genres: Alternative metal; post-grunge
- Length: 39:29
- Label: Hollywood
- Producer: David Bendeth

Breaking Benjamin chronology
Saturate (2002)	We Are Not Alone (2004)	Phobia (2006)

Singles from We Are Not Alone
- 1. "So Cold" Released: March 30, 2004; 2. "Sooner or Later" Released: September 28, 2004; 3. "Rain (2005 version)" Released: June 28, 2005

Professional ratings
Review scores
Source	Rating
AllMusic	2.5/5 stars
IGN	9.3/10

We Are Not Alone is the second studio album by American rock band Breaking Benjamin. It was released on June 29, 2004. Three singles were released from the album, "So Cold", "Sooner or Later", and the full-band version of "Rain". The album's name is a reference to a James Hilton novel of the same name. We Are Not Alone sold 48,000 copies in its first week and was certified platinum by the RIAA on June 13, 2005. Despite not being the first Breaking Benjamin album with explicit music, it was the first to receive a Parental Advisory label.

A Live EP was released with limited editions of the album, containing live recorded versions of "Sugarcoat," "Water," "Medicate," and "Next to Nothing" from their first album Saturate.

We Are Not Alone is the last studio album to feature drummer Jeremy Hummel. The track "Firefly" was featured in the 2004 video games WWE SmackDown! vs. Raw and WWE Day of Reckoning.

According to AllMusic critic Johnny Loftus, the album stylistically incorporates early Tool's sound through post-grunge's more accessible melodics.

== Track listing ==
All tracks are written by Ben Burnley and Breaking Benjamin, except "Follow", "Forget It" and "Rain" written by Burnley, Breaking Benjamin, and Billy Corgan.

Original release
No.	Title	Length
1.	"So Cold"	4:33
2.	"Simple Design"	4:15
3.	"Follow"	3:18
4.	"Firefly"	3:07
5.	"Break My Fall"	3:25
6.	"Forget It"	3:37
7.	"Sooner or Later"	3:39
8.	"Breakdown"	3:36
9.	"Away"	3:12
10.	"Believe"	3:19
11.	"Rain"	3:28
Total length:		39:29

2005 release
No.	Title	Length
12.	"So Cold" (acoustic version)	3:56
13.	"Rain" (2005 version)	3:22
Total length:		42:51

Bonus tracks for Japan
No.	Title	Length
12.	"Ordinary Man"	3:31
13.	"Lady Bug"	3:03
Total length:		49:25

== Personnel ==
Breaking Benjamin

- Benjamin Burnley – lead vocals, rhythm guitar
- Aaron Fink – lead guitar
- Mark James Klepaski – bass guitar
- Jeremy Hummel – drums and percussion (except on "Rain")

Additional musicians

- David Bendeth – additional keyboards
- Billy Corgan – additional guitar on "Forget It"
- Wayne C. Davis – keyboards, programming
- Chad Szeliga – drums on "Rain" (2005 version)

Artwork

- T42Design – art direction and album design
- Michael Halsband – band photography

Production

- David Bendeth – producer, mixing
- Rich Costey – mixing on "So Cold"
- Andy Wallace – mixing on "Follow"
- Michael Brauer – mixing on "Forget It"
- Keith Gary – mixing assistant on "Forget It"
- David Bendeth – additional production
- Dan Korneff – engineer, digital editing
- Jerry Farley – digital editing
- Wayne C. Davis – digital editing
- John Bender – assistant engineer
- Valerie Zyriek – studio coordinator
- J. Colangelo – drum technician
- George Marino – mastering
- Jason Jordan – A&R
- Bladimir Jimenezv – artist coordination
- James "MO" Butts – sound advice
- Freddie Fabbri – consigliere

== Charts ==
=== Weekly charts ===
Weekly chart performance for We Are Not Alone
Chart (2004–2005)	Peak position
New Zealand Albums (RMNZ)	14
US Billboard 200	20

=== Year-end charts ===
2004 year-end chart performance for We Are Not Alone
Chart (2004)	Position
US Billboard 200	160

2005 year-end chart performance for We Are Not Alone
Chart (2005)	Position
US Billboard 200	119

== Certifications ==
Certifications for We Are Not Alone
Region	Certification	Certified units/sales
New Zealand (RMNZ)	Gold	7,500^{^}
United States (RIAA)	Platinum	1,000,000^{^}
^{^} Shipments figures based on certification alone.
