= Shaun Foist =

American drummer

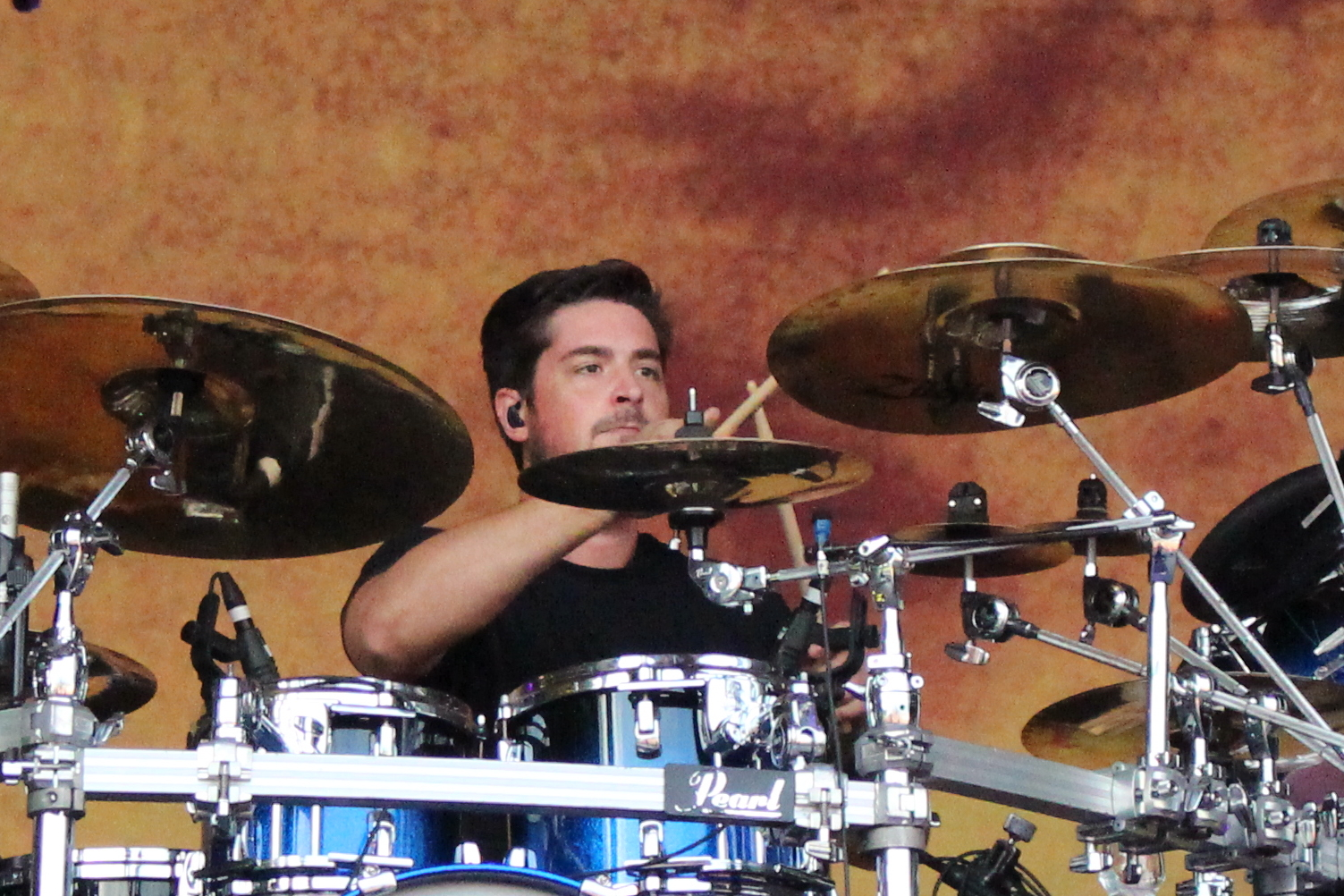
- Foist performing with Breaking Benjamin in 2017

Background information
- Born: Middletown, Ohio
- Genre: Rock
- Occupation: Musician
- Instrument: Drums
- Years active: 2012–present
- Formerly of: Breaking Benjamin
- Website: www.shaunfoist.com

Shaun William Foist is an American drummer who formerly played with the rock band Breaking Benjamin. His previous bands have included Picture Me Broken, Diesel 129, Table 9, and Black Saints Cartel. He also toured with Hinder and Three Days Grace.

He joined Breaking Benjamin in August 2014. He replaced former drummer Chad Szeliga, and at the time of his departure, Foist served as the longest-serving drummer. He played on two studio of their studio albums, Dark Before Dawn (2015) and Ember (2018), as well as their lead single for their upcoming seventh studio album. He also played on a re-recorded compilation album Aurora (2020).

== Early life ==
Foist started drumming at age 5. He was introduced to drumming by his father Bill Foist, who played in local rock bands during the 1970s. As a child, Shaun performed in a school talent show and later pursued drumming more seriously during his high school years, earning recognition with awards like the Louis Armstrong Jazz Award.

== Career ==
Foist played for 11 years with Breaking Benjamin, and has also played with Diesel 129 and Black Saints Cartel. He also toured with Hinder and Three Days Grace.

On August 28, 2025, Foist announced that he would no longer be touring, to focus on his health. On December 9, Foist announced his departure from Breaking Benjamin via Facebook.

== Discography ==
=== With Breaking Benjamin ===
- Dark Before Dawn (2015)
- Ember (2018)
- Aurora (2020)
- "Awaken" (2024)

== Influences ==
In 2012, Foist quoted on the Modern Drummer magazine: "Some of my influences include Neil Peart, Chad Szeliga, Steve Gadd, Billy Cobham, Tony Williams, and Lenny White".

== Current work ==
Foist got together with guitarist Tommy Kessler from Blondie and formed Hötdog Emergency which is a cover band focused around 1980s, 1990s and early 2000s bands. The band played their debut show on October 31, 2025 at the Lucky Star Brewery in Miamisburg, Ohio.

== Reception ==
A 2018 Breaking Benjamin concert review in The Morning Call said that Foist's two-minute solo "was faster, more intricate, and more diverse than most".
