= So Cold (Breaking Benjamin song) =

Single by Breaking Benjamin

from the album We Are Not Alone
- Released: March 30, 2004
- Genre: Post-grunge; nu-metal
- Length: 4:33 (album version); 3:55 (radio/video edit)
- Label: Hollywood
- Songwriter: Benjamin Burnley
- Producer: David Bendeth

Breaking Benjamin singles chronology
"Medicate" (2003)	"So Cold" (2004)	"Sooner or Later" (2004)

Music video
- "So Cold" on YouTube

"So Cold" is a song by American rock band Breaking Benjamin. It was released in March 2004 as the lead single from their second album, We Are Not Alone. Despite never having reached the number one spot on the Mainstream Rock chart, "So Cold" holds the record for the most weeks spent in the chart with 62 weeks. The single was certified Platinum by the RIAA on September 15, 2015, just before the band's debut album Saturate was certified Gold. A reimagined version was released on October 31, 2019 in anticipation for their 2020 album, Aurora.

== Background and writing ==
The movie 28 Days Later was an inspiration while Benjamin Burnley was writing the song.

In 2020, Burnley told Apple Music,

I was in New York when I wrote that song, around 2003. It was wintertime, so it was really cold and I was totally cut off from the world in this really cool hotel in Manhattan that’s not there anymore. It was a bit of a lonely time; I was by myself, and just doing my best to write this record. I didn't really think it was all that great at first, but I was in a bad place in my mind back then, 16 or 18 years ago. Then it took off and it was a huge, huge success for us. So I’m glad I was in that dark space, because I owe my whole career to it.

== Music video ==
The music video of "So Cold" was directed by Frank Borin. The story is set in early US history, and it is interpolated with the band playing the song.

The video opens by showing a preacher standing at the edge of a swamp. The scene then shifts to a group of people walking in a forest. One man can be seen carrying a large stone with the Breaking Benjamin Celtic knot on it. The man, who is being punished for infidelity, is shackled to the stone throughout the video and struggles to free himself from it. Towards the end, the group of people arrive at the swamp where the preacher stands. The man carrying the stone walks into the swamp and drowns.

== Charts ==
=== Weekly charts ===
2004 weekly chart performance for "So Cold"
Chart (2004)	Peak position
Canada Rock Top 30 (Radio & Records)	16
US Billboard Hot 100	76
US Alternative Airplay (Billboard)	3
US Mainstream Rock Airplay (Billboard)	2

2019 weekly chart performance for "So Cold"
Chart (2019)	Peak position
US Hot Rock & Alternative Songs (Billboard)	24

=== Year-end charts ===
2004 year-end chart performance for "So Cold"
Chart (2004)	Position
US Mainstream Rock Tracks (Billboard)	8
US Modern Rock Tracks (Billboard)	17

2005 year-end chart performance for "So Cold"
Chart (2005)	Position
US Mainstream Rock Tracks (Billboard)	11
US Modern Rock Tracks (Billboard)	41

== Certifications ==
Certifications for "So Cold"
Region	Certification	Certified units/sales
New Zealand (RMNZ)	Platinum	30,000^{‡}
United States (RIAA)	Platinum	1,000,000^{‡}
^{‡} Sales+streaming figures based on certification alone.

== So Cold EP ==
So Cold EP

EP by Breaking Benjamin
- Released: November 23, 2004
- Recorded: 2003
- Genres: Alternative metal; post-grunge
- Length: 17:13
- Label: Hollywood

Breaking Benjamin chronology
Live EP (2004)	So Cold EP (2004)	Phobia (2006)

Singles from So Cold EP
- 1. "So Cold (live acoustic)" Released: 2004

So Cold EP is an EP which was released in November, 2004. It was originally going to be titled the So Cold (Acoustic) EP. The EP contains five songs, three were recorded live ("So Cold (live acoustic)", "Away" and "Breakdown") and two were studio recorded material ("Blow Me Away" and "Lady Bug"). Kevin Soffera appears on the tracks "Away" and "Breakdown".

=== Track listing ===
No.	Title	Writer(s)	Length
1.	"So Cold" (live acoustic)	Ben Burnley; Breaking Benjamin	3:55
2.	"Blow Me Away"	Burnley	3:25
3.	"Lady Bug"	Burnley	3:02
4.	"Away" (live)	Burnley; Breaking Benjamin	3:23
5.	"Breakdown" (live)	Burnley; Breaking Benjamin	3:43
Total length:			17:13

=== Personnel ===
- David Bendeth – producer (2), mixing (2)
- Dan Korneff – digital editing (2)
- Breaking Benjamin – producer (3)
- Bret Alexander – producer (3), mixing (3), engineer (3)
- Paul Smith – producer (3), mixing (3), engineer (3)
- Kyle Kelso – mixing (4, 5)
- Andy Van Dette – mastering
- t42design – art direction and design
- Michael Halsband – band photography
