= Keith Wallen =

American musician

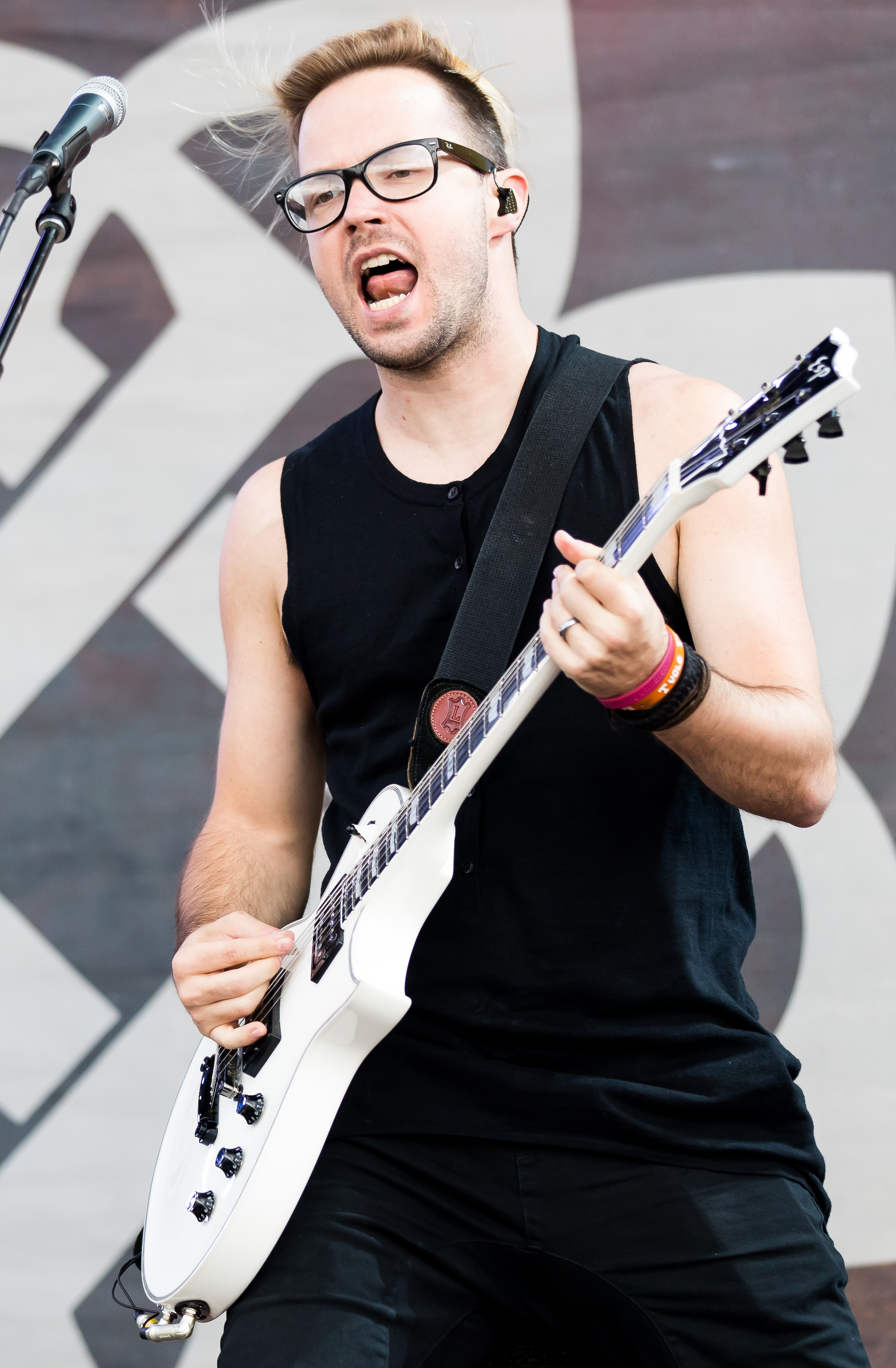
- Wallen performing in 2016

Background information
- Born: Keith Joseph Wallen; February 24, 1980 (age 46); Shady Spring, West Virginia, U.S.
- Genres: Alternative rock; alternative metal; post-grunge; hard rock; indie rock; post-rock
- Occupations: Musician; singer; songwriter
- Instruments: Guitar; vocals
- Years active: 2000–present
- Labels: Rockpie; Virgin; Hollywood; Rise
- Member of: Breaking Benjamin; Copper
- Formerly of: Adelitas Way
- Website: keithwallen.com

Keith Joseph Wallen (born February 24, 1980) is an American musician best known as the rhythm guitarist, backing vocalist and one of the songwriters for the rock band Breaking Benjamin. He is a former guitarist, backing vocalist and co-writer of Adelitas Way, and the co-founder, lead singer, guitarist and main songwriter for Knoxville, Tennessee-based band Copper. Since 2014, Wallen has also been maintaining a solo career.

Wallen co-wrote songs with other artists, notably including rock acts such as Saint Asonia, Love and Death, Red, Pillar, Icon for Hire, We Came as Romans, Fuel, Dorothy and Saving Abel among others.

== Biography ==
=== Early years and Copper ===
Copper's roots go back to Shady Spring, West Virginia, where Wallen and lead guitarist Shane Bragg had been friends since the first grade. They teamed up for occasional acoustic shows, but only began seriously putting a band together while Wallen was attending college at University of Tennessee in Knoxville and Bragg was enrolled at Middle Tennessee State University in Murfreesboro. The original lineup included Wallen, Bragg, bass player Brad Reynolds, and Beau Baxter on drums. They recorded Copper's debut album, Exchange (2001). A drummer and singer Brack Owens joined soon after Exchange was released, and a second album, The Fragile Fall, was recorded with producer Travis Wyrick and released in 2003. Bragg then left the band and was replaced by Shawn Lickliter. Owens and Lickiter were later replaced by Lincoln Nesto on drums and Mike Barnes on lead guitar.

The first single from The Fragile Fall, "By Now", went to Active and Modern Rock radio and entered the top 50 within nine weeks. "Turn" was the second single, was also registered on Radio & Records Active "Most Added" chart for two straight weeks, and reached the top 50 as well. In support of the album, a music video for a song "Inside and Out" was released.

In 2005, Copper was selected from 3000 participants as the winner of J. D'Addario, Guitar.com and Fuse "We're Listening" contest, resulting in appearance on the Fuse Daily Download in March 2006 and being the centerpiece of D'Addarios television and print campaign.

In 2008, Copper released their third album, Take My Chances. It included single "Broken Sky" and a song "Call to Action", which was covered and re-recorded by a Christian rock band Pillar for their album Confessions in 2009. Soon after the album release, Copper went on hiatus, playing two reunion shows: in 2011 and The Fragile Fall 15th anniversary show in 2018.

Copper has played more than 300 shows overall, headlining and supporting bands like Thirty Seconds to Mars, Shinedown, Seether, 10 Years, Breaking Benjamin, and Saliva.

=== Adelitas Way ===
From 2009 to 2013, Wallen was a guitarist and backing vocalist for Las Vegas, Nevada based rock band Adelitas Way. During the time with the band, he took part in recording of two albums, Adelitas Way (2009) and Home School Valedictorian (2011), as well as intensive touring and sharing the stage with such notable acts like Guns N' Roses, Creed, Papa Roach, Godsmack, Theory of a Deadman, Three Days Grace, Deftones, Puddle of Mudd, Sick Puppies, Staind, Alter Bridge, Skillet, Halestorm and others. Wallen also co-wrote three song for Home School Valedictorian, "Cage the Beast", "I Can Tell" and "Hurt".

=== Breaking Benjamin ===
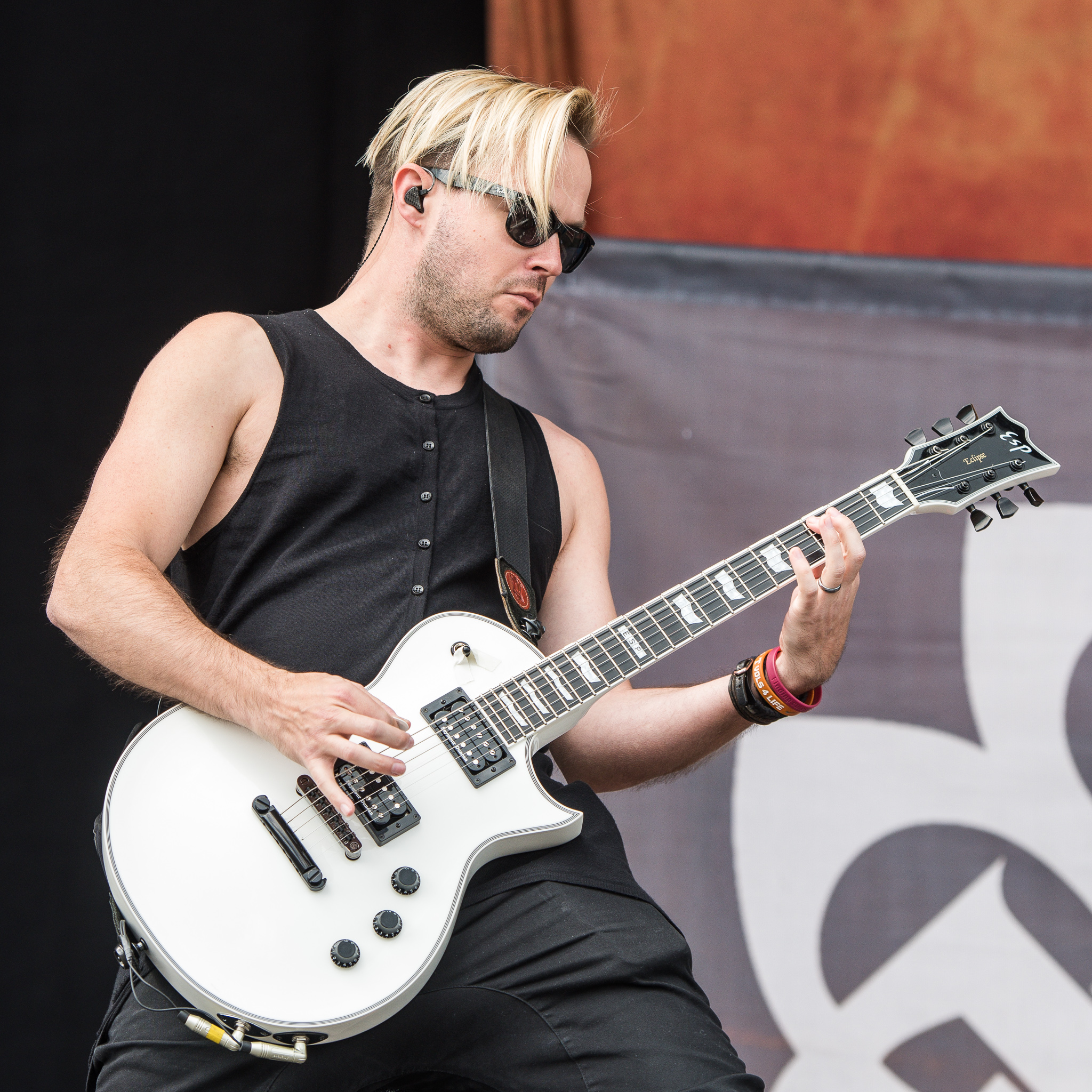
Wallen performing with Breaking Benjamin in 2016

On August 19, 2014, after four years of hiatus, Breaking Benjamin announced the reformation via the official Facebook page. The band re-emerged as a quintet, including Wallen as a guitarist and backing vocalist.

=== Solo career ===
On June 24, 2014, Wallen released his first solo effort, a five-track indie acoustic and piano driven Allies EP.

In 2018, Wallen released two alternative pop singles, "Summer Sunday" and "Four Letter Words", produced by Colin Brittain.

In 2019, three solo singles were released: two acoustic covers ("Shallow" by Lady Gaga and Bradley Cooper, and "The Look" by Roxette) and one original alternative rock song, "Crows".

Throughout 2020, Wallen posted pictures from the studio on his social media, hinting work on his debut solo full-length album alongside Joe Rickard and Jasen Rauch. On January 15, 2021, "Dream Away", the first single off the album, was released, followed by singles "It Finds Us All", "All Eyes on You", "Wildfire" and "Fractured". On August 13, 2021, the album titled This World or the Next, produced by Rickard and Brittain, was released.

In 2022, Wallen recruited a live band consisting of Red's touring guitarist/backing vocalist Lucio Rubino, Breaking Benjamin's bass/guitar tech Mike Warren and drummer Blake Bailey of The Dead Rabbitts, played a couple of US summer dates and joined Red for autumn European tour.

On January 12, 2024, Wallen released a single "Strings" along with the music video, and announced his follow-up solo album, Infinity Now, which was released on May 3, 2024 via Rise Records.

== Discography ==
With Breaking Benjamin

- 2015 – Dark Before Dawn
- 2018 – Ember
- 2020 – Aurora

With Adelitas Way

- 2009 – Adelitas Way
- 2011 – Home School Valedictorian

With Copper

- 2001 – Exchange
- 2003 – Fragile Fall
- 2008 – Take My Chances

With Flat Black

- 2024 – Dark Side of the Brain (songwriting only)

As a solo artist

- 2014 – Allies EP
- 2021 – This World or the Next
- 2024 – Infinity Now

=== Singles ===
Title	Year	Peak chart positions	Album
Title	Year	US Main.	Album
"Summer Sunday"	2018	—	Non-album single
"Four Letter Word"	2018	—	Non-album single
"Shallow"	2019	—	Non-album single
"Crows"	2019	—	Non-album single
"The Look"	2019	—	Non-album single
"Dream Away"	2021	32	This World or the Next
"It Finds Us All"	2021	—	This World or the Next
"All Eyes on You"	2021	—	This World or the Next
"Wildfire"	2021	—	This World or the Next
"Fractured"	2021	—	This World or the Next
"Strings"	2024	—	Infinity Now
"Headspace Holiday"	2024	30	Infinity Now
"The Wolf"	2024	—	Infinity Now
"Us Against the World"	2025	—	TBA
"I'm with You"	2025	—	TBA
"Dead Inside"	2025	—	TBA
"Teeth Marks" (featuring Haley Roughton)	2025	—	TBA
"A Thin Line"	2026	—	TBA

=== Guest vocal ===
- 2021 – Love and Death – "The Hunter"
- 2021 – Frank Zummo – "Ways to Go"
- 2022 – We Are Pigs – "Clavicle"
- 2022 – Ra and Jason Hook – "Incomplete"

=== Music videos ===
List of music videos, showing year released and director
Title	Year	Director(s)
"Summer Sunday"	2018	Kyle Cogan
"Four Letter Word"	2018	Courtney Dellafiora
"Shallow"	2019	Courtney Dellafiora
"Crows"	2019	Courtney Dellafiora
"The Look"	2019	Courtney Dellafiora
"Dream Away"	2021	Wombat Fire
"It Finds Us All"	2021	Wombat Fire
"All Eyes on You"	2021	Wombat Fire
"Wildfire"	2021	Wombat Fire
"Fractured"	2021	Wombat Fire
"Blue"	2021	Wombat Fire
"Like Home"	2023	Courtney Dellafiora
"Strings"	2024	Jake Johnston
"Headspace Holiday"	2024	Jake Johnston
"The Wolf"	2024	Courtney Dellafiora
"Us Against the World"	2025	Keith Wallen and Courtney Dellafiora
"I'm with You"	2025	Unknown
"Dead Inside"	2025	Keith Wallen and Courtney Dellafiora
"Teeth Marks"	2025	Keith Wallen
"A Thin Line"	2026	Keith Wallen
