= Shallow Bay: The Best of Breaking Benjamin =

Greatest hits album by Breaking Benjamin
- Released: August 16, 2011
- Genre: Alternative metal; post-grunge
- Length: 55:50
- Label: Hollywood
- Producer: David Bendeth

Breaking Benjamin chronology
Dear Agony (2009)	Shallow Bay: The Best of Breaking Benjamin (2011)	Dark Before Dawn (2015)

Singles from Shallow Bay: The Best of Breaking Benjamin
- 1. "Blow Me Away" Released: June 7, 2011

Deluxe edition cover
- Deluxe edition cover

Professional ratings
Review scores
Source	Rating
AllMusic	2.5/5 stars
Loudwire	4/5 stars

Shallow Bay: The Best of Breaking Benjamin is the first greatest hits album by American rock band Breaking Benjamin, released on August 16, 2011, by Hollywood Records. The album features every single released by the band from 2002's Saturate to 2009's Dear Agony, with the exception of the 2010 digital single version of "Blow Me Away"; instead featuring the remix of that track featuring vocals of Sydnee Duran of Valora. A two-disc deluxe version was released alongside it, featuring remastered versions of B-sides, covers, acoustic performances, live recordings, and other rarities. Shallow Bay debuted at number 22 on the US Billboard 200, and sold an initial 13,700 copies. It topped the US Top Hard Rock Albums chart for three consecutive years, from 2011 to 2013, and also reached number four on the US Top Alternative Albums and US Top Rock Albums charts for 2011.

Despite its name, the track "Shallow Bay" from Saturate does not appear on the album. The 2005 single "Rain" does not appear on the album either, but instead the 2004 studio version of the song which was never released as a single is also featured.

== Background and release ==
In March 2010, Hollywood Records requested that the band produce two new master recordings, sought permission to release a new version of the hit song "Blow Me Away", featuring Sydnee Duran of Valora, and requested the production of Shallow Bay. In May 2011, guitarist Aaron Fink and bassist Mark James Klepaski granted the record company's requests after they were offered a $100,000 payment. Benjamin Burnley, alleging that Fink and Klepaski did not inform him, the band's management, or the band's lawyer, fired the two via email, demanding at least $250,000 in compensatory and punitive damages, as well as the exclusive right to the name "Breaking Benjamin". Fink and Klepaski's attorneys stated the two "dispute and strictly deny" Burnley's allegations, instead asserting that "at issue is the validity of a January 2009 partnership agreement giving Burnley permission to dismiss Fink and Klepaski for 'cause,'" saying that the agreement was no longer valid due to Burnley's status of indefinite hiatus. The case was ordered by a judge to arbitration. Burnley's attorney, Brian Caplan, told the Associated Press, "The relationship between Mr. Burnley and the two other members of the band has ended ... Mr. Burnley intends on moving forward using the name Breaking Benjamin and the band will continue. It just won't continue in its prior configuration. He's not retiring."

In August 2011, Hollywood Records scheduled the release of Shallow Bay, featuring every Breaking Benjamin single released, including the remix of "Blow Me Away". Burnley publicly opposed the album's release, saying content had been altered without his consent and did not meet his standards, refusing to consider it part of the official Breaking Benjamin catalog. The disc received positive critical reception, Loudwire giving the compilation a score of 4 out of 5, with The Daily Trojan praising it for balance and a progressive retrospective history, concluding with "For the first-timers, welcome to Breaking Benjamin."

== Track listing ==
Standard edition
No.	Title	Writer(s)	Original release	Length
1.	"Polyamorous"	Benjamin Burnley; Aaron Fink; Jeremy Hummel; Mark James Klepaski	Saturate (2002)	2:57
2.	"Skin"	Burnley; Fink; Hummel; Klepaski	Saturate	3:21
3.	"Medicate"	Burnley; Fink; Hummel; Klepaski	Saturate	3:46
4.	"So Cold"	Burnley; Fink; Hummel; Klepaski	We Are Not Alone (2004)	4:34
5.	"Sooner or Later"	Burnley; Fink; Hummel; Klepaski	We Are Not Alone	3:39
6.	"Rain"	Burnley; Fink; Hummel; Klepaski; Billy Corgan	We Are Not Alone	3:25
7.	"The Diary of Jane"	Burnley; Fink; Klepaski	Phobia (2006)	3:20
8.	"Breath"	Burnley; Klepaski	Phobia	3:38
9.	"Until the End"	Burnley; Fink; Klepaski	Phobia	4:13
10.	"I Will Not Bow"	Burnley; Jasen Rauch	Dear Agony (2009)	3:36
11.	"Lights Out"	Burnley; Rauch	Dear Agony	3:35
12.	"Give Me a Sign"	Burnley	Dear Agony	4:19
13.	"Blow Me Away" (featuring Valora)	Burnley; Fink; Hummel; Klepaski		3:09
14.	"Water"	Burnley	Breaking Benjamin (2001)	4:02
15.	"Had Enough" (live acoustic)	Burnley		4:16
Total length:				55:50

Deluxe edition – disc one
No.	Title	Writer(s)	Length
1.	"Polyamorous"	Burnley; Fink; Hummel; Klepaski	2:57
2.	"Skin"	Burnley; Fink; Hummel; Klepaski	3:21
3.	"Medicate"	Burnley; Fink; Hummel; Klepaski	3:46
4.	"So Cold"	Burnley; Fink; Hummel; Klepaski	4:34
5.	"Sooner or Later"	Burnley; Fink; Hummel; Klepaski	3:39
6.	"Rain"	Burnley; Fink; Hummel; Klepaski; Corgan	3:25
7.	"The Diary of Jane"	Burnley; Fink; Klepaski	3:20
8.	"Breath"	Burnley; Klepaski	3:38
9.	"Until the End"	Burnley; Fink; Klepaski	4:13
10.	"I Will Not Bow"	Burnley; Rauch	3:36
11.	"Lights Out"	Burnley; Rauch	3:35
12.	"Give Me a Sign"	Burnley	4:19
13.	"Blow Me Away" (featuring Valora)	Burnley; Fink; Hummel; Klepaski	3:09
Total length:			47:32

Deluxe edition – disc two
No.	Title	Writer(s)	Length
1.	"Ordinary Man" (We Are Not Alone Japanese B-side)	Burnley; Fink; Hummel; Klepaski	3:31
2.	"Water" (remastered EP version)	Burnley	4:02
3.	"Who Wants to Live Forever" (Queen cover)	Brian May	3:12
4.	"I Will Not Bow" (acoustic + strings mix)	Burnley; Rauch	4:06
5.	"Better Days" (previously unreleased)	Burnley; Fink; Hummel; Klepaski; Corgan	3:23
6.	"Polyamorous" (acoustic)	Burnley; Fink; Hummel; Klepaski	3:04
7.	"Lie to Me" (previously unreleased)	Burnley; Fink; Hummel; Klepaski	4:05
8.	"Lady Bug" (We Are Not Alone Japanese B-side)	Burnley; Fink; Hummel; Klepaski	3:02
9.	"Enjoy the Silence" (Depeche Mode cover)	Martin Gore	3:29
10.	"Until the End" (live acoustic)	Burnley; Fink; Klepaski	4:41
11.	"Breath" (live acoustic)	Burnley; Klepaski	4:56
Total length:			41:31

== Personnel ==
The track numbers correspond to the deluxe edition.

Breaking Benjamin

- Benjamin Burnley – vocals, guitar
- Aaron Fink – lead guitar
- Mark James Klepaski – bass guitar
- Jeremy Hummel – drums (1–1 to 1–6, 2–1, 2–2, 2–5, 2–8)
- Chad Szeliga – drums and percussion (1–7 to 1–12, 2–10, 2–11)

Additional musicians

- David Bendeth – additional keyboards (1–4 to 1–6, 2–1), programming (1–13)
- Wayne C. Davis – keyboards and programming (1–4 to 1–6)
- Billy Corgan – guitar (2–5)
- Suzie Catayama – strings arrangement (1–1 to 1–3)
- Syd Duran – featured vocalist (1–13)
- Jonathan "Bug" Price – bass (2–2)

Technical personnel

- Ulrich Wild – producer and engineer (1–1 to 1–3, 2–6)
- David Bendeth – producer (1–4 to 1–13, 2–1, 2–3 to 2–5, 2–7), mixing (1–5, 1–6, 1–10, 1–12, 1–13, 2–1 to 2–11)
- Bret Alexander – producer and engineer (2–2, 2–8, 2–9)
- Paul Smith – producer and engineer (2–2, 2–8, 2–9)
- Breaking Benjamin – producer (2–2, 2–8, 2–9)
- Chris Lord-Alge – mixing (1–1 to 1–3, 1–7)
- Rich Costey – mixing (1–4)
- Ben Grosse – mixing (1–8, 1–9)
- Dan Korneff – engineer and digital editing (1–4 to 1–13, 2–1 to 2–11), mixing (1–11), mix engineer (1–13)
- John Bender – engineer and digital editing (1–7 to 1–13, 2–3, 2–5, 2–7), assistant engineer (1–4 to 1–6, 2–1)
- Kato Khandwala – engineer (1–10 to 1–12), digital editing (1–7 to 1–12)
- Jon D'Uva – engineer and digital editing (1–10 to 1–12)
- Greg Tobler – engineer (2–10, 2–11)
- The Jerry Farley – digital editing (1–4 to 1–6)
- Wayne C. Davis – digital editing (1–4 to 1–6)
- Ted Regier – assistant engineer (1–1 to 1–3)
- Alex Reverberi – assistant engineer (1–1 to 1–3)
- Chris Wonzer – assistant vocal engineer (1–1 to 1–3)
- Mark Rinaldi – assistant engineer (1–7 to 1–9)
- Austin Briggs – assistant engineer (1–7 to 1–9)
- Mitch Milan – assistant engineer (1–10 to 1–12)
- Ted Young – assistant engineer (2–3)
- Keith Armstrong – assistant mix engineer (1–7)
- Dim-E – assistant mix engineer (1–7)
- Paul Pavao – assistant mix engineer (1–8, 1–9)
- Stephen Marcussen – mastering (1–1 to 1–3)
- George Marino – mastering (1–4 to 1–6)
- Ted Jensen – mastering (1–7 to 1–13, 2–1, 2–2)

== Chart positions ==
Album

Chart (2011)	Peak position
US Billboard 200	22
US Top Alternative Albums (Billboard)	4
US Top Hard Rock Albums (Billboard)	1
US Top Rock Albums (Billboard)	4
US Top Tastemaker Albums (Billboard)	12

Singles

Song (2011)	US	US Alt.	US Main.	US Rock
"Blow Me Away" (featuring Valora)	120	37	5	14

== Certifications ==
Region	Certification	Certified units/sales
New Zealand (RMNZ)	Gold	7,500^{‡}
^{‡} Sales+streaming figures based on certification alone.
