= 2015 in rock music =

This article summarizes the events related to rock music for the year of 2015.

== Notable events ==
=== January ===
- Foo Fighters's single "Something from Nothing" tops the Billboard Mainstream Rock songs chart for the entirety of the month, in a run that spans 13 weeks across December 2014 to February 2015. The song also simultaneously tops the Mainstream Rock and Alternative Songs chart. As of 2015, the band is the only band to top both simultaneously with a song in the 2010s, with the feat becoming rare due to alternative music's shift to less guitar-driven music.
- I Prevail's hard rock cover of Taylor Swift's song Blank Space breaks into the all-format Billboard Hot 100, the band's only song with crossover success. It's later certified Gold in the US, indicating 500,000 units sold.
- Fall Out Boy releases their sixth studio album, American Beauty/American Psycho. It tops the US all-format Billboard 200 album chart, selling 218,000 album equivalent units. It is their third album to top the chart.
- The Decemberists release their seventh studio album, What a Terrible World, What a Beautiful World. It debuts at number seven on the Billboard 200 chart, selling 51,000 album equivalent units.
- Marilyn Manson releases his ninth studio album, The Pale Emperor. It debuts at number 7 on the Billboard 200 chart, selling 51,000 album equivalent units.

=== February ===
- Three Days Grace's single "I Am Machine" tops the Billboard Mainstream Rock chart and stays there for six consecutive weeks.
- Lenny Kravitz performs at Super Bowl 49. He plays guitar and duets with Katy Perry on her song "I Kissed A Girl".

=== March ===
- Papa Roach's single "Face Everything and Rise" tops the Billboard Mainstream Rock chart for one week. It is their second song to do so.
- Halestorm's single "Apocalyptic" tops the Billboard Mainstream rock chart for one week. It is their second to do so.
- Death Cab for Cutie releases their eighth studio album, Kintsugi. It debuts at number 8 on the Billboard 200 chart, selling 56,000 album equivalent units. The album also later receives a Grammy Nomination.
- Modest Mouse releases their sixth studio album, Strangers to Ourselves. It debuts at number 3 on the Billboard 200 chart, selling 77,000 album equivalent units.

=== April ===
- Foo Fighters's single "Congregation", featuring Zac Brown, tops the Billboard Mainstream Rock chart for 3 weeks.
- The Offspring's single "Coming for You" tops the Mainstream Rock chart for 1 week. It is their second song to do so, and their first to do so in over 18 years, after their single "Gone Away" did in 1997.
- All Time Low releases their sixth studio album, Future Hearts. It debuts at number 2 on the Billboard 200 chart, selling 80,000 album equivalent units, and sold 75,000 albums, topping the Billboard Top Album Sales chart. Both were their best debuts on the charts to date.
- Halestorm releases their third studio album, Into the Wild Life. It debuts at number 5 on the Billboard 200 chart, selling 56,000 album equivalent units, their most successful album debut to date.

=== May ===
- The Pretty Reckless's single "Follow Me Down" tops the Billboard Mainstream Rock chart for one week.
- Breaking Benjamin's single "Failure" tops the Billboard Mainstream Rock chart. It tops the chart for nine straight weeks, across much of June and July as well. The song also has cross-over success, peaking at Billboard's US all-format Hot 100 song chart.
- Zac Brown Band, while generally more associated with country music, sends their more rock-oriented song, Heavy is the Head", featuring rock vocalist Chris Cornell (of Soundgarden and Audioslave) to rock radio. The song ends up topping the Billboard Mainstream Rock chart for two weeks.

- Incubus release their EP Trust Fall (Side A). It debuts at number 6 on the Billboard 200, selling 40,000 album equivalent units.

=== June ===
- Breaking Benjamin releases their fifth studio album, Dark Before Dawn. It tops the Billboard 200 chart, selling 141,000 album equivalent units. It is their first album to do so, and the band's first album to feature a fully new lineup outside of band founder and frontman Ben Burnley, following a hiatus due to Burnley's health problems and legal issues during much of the early 2010s.
- Muse releases their seventh studio album, Drones. It tops the Billboard 200 chart, selling 84,000 album equivalent units. It is their first album to do so. The album also tops the all-format album charts of several other countries, including the UK OCC chart and the Australian ARIA chart. The album later wins a Grammy Award for Best Rock Album.

=== July ===
- Halestorm's single "Amen" tops the Billboard Mainstream Rock chart for a week. It is their fourth song to do so.
- Bring Me the Horizon's single "Happy Song" tops the Billboard US Hard Rock Digital Songs chart, selling 11,000 copies in its opening week.
- Tame Impala releases their third studio album Currents. Its tops the Australian ARIA all-format album chart in its debut week. It debuts at number 4 on the Billboard 200 chart, selling 50,000 album equivalent units. It is also the first album to top the UK's Official Charts Company's newly created Official Progressive Albums chart, created to track music of the progressive rock genre.

=== August ===
- Shinedown's single "Cut the Cord" tops the Billboard Mainstream Rock chart for three weeks.
- Disturbed's single "The Vengeful One" tops the Billboard Mainstream Rock chart for a single week.
- Disturbed releases their sixth studio album, Immortalized. It tops the Billboard 200 chart, selling 98,000 album equivalent units. It is their fifth studio album in a row the top the chart, a feat only done by two other bands, Dave Matthews Band and Metallica.
- Ghost releases their second studio album, Meliora. It debuts at number 8, selling 29,000 album equivalent units.
- Bullet for My Valentine releases their fifth studio album, Venon. It debuts at number 8, selling 28,000 album equivalent units.
- Frank Turner releases his sixth studio album, Positive Songs for Negative People. It peaked at number 2 on the UK albums chart and was certified silver.

=== September ===
- Shinedown's single "Cut the Cord" returns to the top the Billboard Mainstream Rock chart for four more consecutive weeks.
- Bring Me the Horizon releases their fifth studio album, That's the Spirit. It debuts a number 2 on the Billboard 200 chart, selling 62,000 album equivalent units. It also debuts at number 2 on the UK all-format OCC albums chart, and tops the Australian all-format ARIA albums chart, their highest performance on all three charts.

- Shinedown releases their fifth studio album, Threat to Survival. It debuts at number 6 on the Billboard 200 chart, selling 65,000 album equivalent units.
- Pink Floyd's David Gilmour releases his fourth solo album, Rattle That Lock. It debuts at number 5 on the Billboard 200 chart, selling 71,000 album equivalent units. The album also tops the UK album charts, his second solo album to do so.

=== October ===
- Red Sun Rising's debut single as a band, "The Otherside" tops the Billboard Mainstream Rock chart for one week.
- Pop Evil's single "Footsteps" tops the Billboard Mainstream Rock chart and stays there for four weeks.

- Coheed and Cambria release their eighth studio album, The Color Before the Sun. It debuts at number 10 on the Billboard' 200 chart, selling 32,000 album equivalent units. It is their sixth studio album to debut in the top 10, and their first and only album to not be a concept album, with all others telling the story of The Amory Wars.

- The Jack White and Alison Mosshart fronted band The Dead Weather release their third studio album, Dodge and Burn. It debuts at number 10 on the Billboard 200 chart, selling 33,000 album equivalent units.
- Five Finger Death Punch release their sixth studio album Got Your Six. It debuts at number 2 on the Billboard 200 chart, selling 119,000 album equivalent units.

=== November ===
- Breaking Benjamin's single "Angels Fall" tops the Mainstream Rock chart, and stays there for 4 weeks.
- The November 2015 Paris attacks disrupt an Eagles of Death Metal concert, with over 130 people killed over the course of the attacks.

=== December ===
- Bring Me the Horizon's single "Throne" tops the Mainstream Rock chart for 2 weeks. It is their first song to do so.

- Disturbed's single "The Light" tops the Mainstream Rock chart for 5 weeks, in a run that bleeds into January 2016.

- Coldplay released their seventh studio album, A Head Full of Dreams. The album debuted at number 2 on the Billboard 200 chart, selling 210,000 album equivalent units.

=== Year end ===
- Tame Impala wins "Album of the Year" at the Australian 2015 ARIA Awards for the release of their third studio album Currents. They also win "Best International Group" at the Brit Awards following the album's release.

== Deaths ==
- Lemmy Kilmister, frontman and vocalist of Motörhead, dies on December 28, 2015, of cancer at age 70.
- Scott Weiland, original vocalist of Stone Temple Pilots and Velvet Revolver, dies on December 4, 2015, of a drug overdose at age 48.

== Band breakups ==
- The Black Crowes
- Motörhead
