= Give Me a Sign =

Single by Breaking Benjamin

from the album Dear Agony
- Released: January 5, 2010
- Genre: Alternative rock
- Length: 4:17 (album version); 3:45 (radio edit)
- Label: Hollywood
- Songwriter: Benjamin Burnley
- Producer: David Bendeth

Breaking Benjamin singles chronology
"I Will Not Bow" (2009)	"Give Me a Sign" (2010)	"Lights Out" (2010)

Alternative cover

Music video
- "Give Me a Sign" on YouTube

"Give Me a Sign", subtitled on the single "Give Me a Sign (Forever and Ever)", is a song by American rock band Breaking Benjamin. It was released in January 2010 as the second single from their fourth album Dear Agony.

== Release ==
The song was released as a radio single on January 5, 2010. Upon its release as a single, the song has adopted the extended title, "Give Me a Sign (Forever and Ever)". The song reached number 97 on the Billboard Hot 100. It was far more successful on the Billboard rock charts, reaching number six on the Hot Mainstream Rock Tracks chart, number nine on the Hot Rock Songs chart, and number 10 on the Alternative Songs chart.

An acoustic version was released by the band on January 13, 2010. The acoustic version was placed on the Japanese import release of Dear Agony.

Along with the singles "Sooner or Later" and "Until the End", "Give Me a Sign" has been released as a downloadable song on Guitar Hero 5 and Band Hero through the Breaking Benjamin Track Pack DLC.

== Track listing ==
Promotional single No. 1
No.	Title	Length
1.	"Give Me a Sign (Forever and Ever) (radio edit)"	3:41
2.	"Give Me a Sign (Forever and Ever) (radio edit)"	3:41
3.	"Give Me a Sign (Forever and Ever) (album version)"	4:17
4.	"Give Me a Sign (Forever and Ever) (call-out hook No. 1)"	0:11
5.	"Give Me a Sign (Forever and Ever) (call-out hook No. 2)"	0:08

Promotional single No. 2
No.	Title	Length
1.	"Give Me a Sign (Forever and Ever) pop edit"	3:45
2.	"Give Me a Sign (Forever and Ever) alt radio edit"	3:40
3.	"Give Me a Sign (Forever and Ever) call-out hook No. 1"	0:11
4.	"Give Me a Sign (Forever and Ever) call-out hook No. 2"	0:08

== Music video ==
On February 17, a music video was put into the planning process. The band shot the video for "Give Me a Sign" with acclaimed director Nigel Dick. While singer Benjamin Burnley said he had not completely divulged the concept, he added an element of suspense by stating that he hoped fans of the band would "recognize and be excited by the inclusion of certain key characters from the band's past". The video premiered on their Myspace page on March 10, which happened to be Benjamin Burnley's 32nd birthday. It is the last Breaking Benjamin video to feature Aaron Fink, Mark Klepaski, and Chad Szeliga.

The music video shows an unconscious young woman rushed into a hospital with her boyfriend running at her side, plus an old man and a young child in their own rooms. A man whose face can't be seen comes into the last two's respective rooms and takes their hands to bring them to a bright light outside the rooms. The worrying boyfriend is sitting next to the woman's bed, hoping for her to wake up when the faceless man takes his hand. The woman wakes up shortly after, meaning he died in a possible car crash, his ghost accompanying her to the hospital while she survived.

Each room features artwork from Breaking Benjamin's albums. The young boy's EEG displays a picture of the cover art from Saturate. The bald old man with the Breaking Benjamin tattoo on his finger is from the cover of We Are Not Alone. The faceless man represents the "Evil Angel" from the cover of Phobia, and the song of the same name; and the woman in the hospital bed resembles Jane from "The Diary of Jane" music video. Her room features the MRI scan of Ben's head from the cover of Dear Agony.

== Charts ==
=== Weekly charts ===
Chart (2010)	Peak position
US Billboard Hot 100	97
US Hot Rock & Alternative Songs (Billboard)	9

=== Year-end charts ===
Chart (2010)	Position
US Hot Rock & Alternative Songs (Billboard)	35

== Certifications ==
Region	Certification	Certified units/sales
United States (RIAA)	Gold	500,000^{‡}
^{‡} Sales+streaming figures based on certification alone.
