= List of songs in Guitar Hero 5 =

Guitar Hero 5 is the fifth main title in the Guitar Hero series of rhythm games, released worldwide in September 2009 for the Xbox 360, PlayStation 2 and 3 and Wii consoles. In the game, players use special instrument controllers to simulate the playing of lead and bass guitar, drums, and vocals for rock and other songs. Players are awarded points by performing specific actions on the controllers to match notes that scroll on screen that correspond with the appropriate instrument. Successfully hitting notes increases the player's scoring and performance meter, while missing too many notes will lower the performance meter and may cause the song to end prematurely. Songs can be played either by oneself, competitively with other players in several game modes, or cooperative with up to three other players in their own virtual band. Although traditionally a four-player band can have one player on each instrument, Guitar Hero 5 allows any four-player combination of these instruments to be used, such as a band composed of four drummers. Guitar Hero 5 is considered by its developers to be an expansion of the series into more "social play", featuring modes such as Party Play, which allows players to drop in and out and change difficulty in the middle of a song without worrying about failing or losing points. Guitar Hero 5 is distributed with 85 songs on-disc, many being from artists that have yet to have their music featured in a rhythm video game, and more than half having been published in the last decade. The setlist was considered the weakest part of the game; although it was praised for its diversity, critics believed that the widely varying genres represented would mean that players would not enjoy every song in the game. Guitar Hero 5 is the first game in the series to reuse content from previous Guitar Hero games. Most of the existing downloadable content for Guitar Hero World Tour can be reused in Guitar Hero 5 without additional cost, while for a small fee, players can import a selection of songs from Guitar Hero World Tour and Guitar Hero Smash Hits into Guitar Hero 5. Such content is incorporated into the main game modes. Critics praised the ability to reuse content from older games, but felt that more songs should have been transferable when the game was launched. Activision no longer provides new downloadable content for Guitar Hero 5 since the release of Guitar Hero: Warriors of Rock in September 2010.

== Main setlist ==
Excluding its downloadable content, Guitar Hero 5 features 85 songs, all based on master recordings or live performances, from 83 musicians. Tracks from 30 artists represent their "music-rhythm video game debut". Game director Brian Bright has called the track list "fresh"; 25% of the songs were released in the last 18 months, and more than 50% from the current decade. Unlike previous versions of the Guitar Hero series, in which players must work through a career mode to unlock all the songs in the game, all songs in Guitar Hero 5 are unlocked and are playable in any mode from the start. However, a Career mode is presented in the game, similar to Guitar Hero: Metallica, in which players acquire a number of stars from their performances in earlier venues to unlock new venues. The song order within the venues remains the same regardless of the number of players or the instruments played. Venues are generally ordered by overall song difficulty; songs become more difficult in later venues. Also, 69 of the songs are importable into Band Hero for a nominal fee.

Critics appreciated many of Guitar Hero 5's features, but found the soundtrack to be the weakest feature of the game. Matt Helgeson of Game Informer called the track list "extremely diverse", and Arthur Gies of GameSpy felt that the song selection was based on "careful consideration for the most part", to avoid songs with short-lived appeal. However, the variety of songs was found to also work against the game. Reviewers noted that players would find songs they liked, but at the same time, would find songs they loathed. Erik Brudvig of IGN noted that while "the goal was to include a bit of everything", the range of songs on the track list "ensure[s] that nobody will like everything on the disc". The soundtrack's diversity also affected the Career progression; while the guitar difficulty progression in the Career mode was considered better than in previous games, it left the vocals and drummer progression "all over the place".

The songs in Guitar Hero 5's track list are listed below, including the year of the song's recording, song title, artist, venue where the song is played in the Career progression, and whether or not the track is exportable for Band Hero, Guitar Hero: Warriors of Rock or other future games.

Year	Song	Artist	Career Venue	Genre	Exportable
1984	"2 Minutes to Midnight"	Iron Maiden	12. The Golden Gate	Heavy Metal	No
1973	"20th Century Boy"	T. Rex	8. Neon Oasis	Glam Rock	Yes
1969	"21st Century Schizoid Man"^{+}	King Crimson	14. Hypersphere	Prog Rock	Yes
2008	"A-Punk"	Vampire Weekend	8. Neon Oasis	Surf Rock	Yes
1967	"All Along the Watchtower"	Bob Dylan	1. The 13th Rail	Blues Rock	No
2006	"All The Pretty Faces"	The Killers	7. Guitarhenge	Alternative	Yes
1976	"American Girl"	Tom Petty and the Heartbreakers	12. The Golden Gate	Power Pop	No
2009	"Back Round"	Wolfmother	11. Cairo Bazaar	Hard Rock	Yes
2001	"Bleed American"	Jimmy Eat World	6. The Aqueduct	Pop Rock	Yes
2008	"Blue Day"	Darker My Love	2. Club Boson	Indie Rock	Yes
2005	"Blue Orchid"	The White Stripes	2. Club Boson	Blues Rock	Yes
2007	"Brianstorm"	Arctic Monkeys	12. The Golden Gate	Alternative	Yes
2009	"Bring the Noise 20XX"	Public Enemy featuring Zakk Wylde	8. Neon Oasis	Hip Hop	Yes
1995	"Bullet with Butterfly Wings"	The Smashing Pumpkins	9. Electric Honky Tonk	Grunge	Yes
2007	"Cigarettes, Wedding Bands"	Band of Horses	3. Sideshow	Southern Rock	Yes
1994	"Comedown"	Bush	4. Angel's Crypt	Grunge	Yes
1982	"Dancing with Myself"	Billy Idol	4. Angel's Crypt	New Wave	No
2002	"Deadbolt"^{+}	Thrice	12. The Golden Gate	Alternative	Yes
2007	"Demon(s)"^{+}	Darkest Hour	13. Fjord of Swords	Melodic Death Metal	Yes
1995	"Disconnected"	Face to Face	9. Electric Honky Tonk	Pop Punk	Yes
2008	"Done with Everything, Die for Nothing"^{+}	Children of Bodom	13. Fjord of Swords	Melodic Death Metal	Yes
1976	"Do You Feel Like We Do?" (Live)	Peter Frampton	13. Fjord of Swords	Classic Rock	Yes
1997	"Du Hast"	Rammstein	8. Neon Oasis	Industrial	No
2000	"Ex-Girlfriend"	No Doubt	3. Sideshow	Pop Rock	Yes
1975	"Fame"	David Bowie	3. Sideshow	Classic Rock	No
2005	"Feel Good Inc."	Gorillaz	1. The 13th Rail	Alternative	No
2008	"Gamma Ray"	Beck	1. The 13th Rail	Alternative	Yes
1992	"Gratitude"	Beastie Boys	2. Club Boson	Rap Rock	Yes
1982	"Hungry Like the Wolf"	Duran Duran	6. The Aqueduct	New Wave	Yes
1982	"Hurts So Good"	John Mellencamp	2. Club Boson	Pop Rock	Yes
2006	"Incinerate"	Sonic Youth	10. Calavera Square	Alternative	No
2002	"In My Place"	Coldplay	1. The 13th Rail	Pop Rock	Yes
2007	"In the Meantime"	Spacehog	5. O'Connell's Corner	Alternative	Yes
1976	"Jailbreak"	Thin Lizzy	6. The Aqueduct	Hard Rock	Yes
2000	"Judith"	A Perfect Circle	12. The Golden Gate	Alternative	Yes
2000	"Kryptonite"	3 Doors Down	4. Angel's Crypt	Post-Grunge	Yes
2000	"L.A."	Elliott Smith	5. O'Connell's Corner	Indie Rock	Yes
1992	"Lithium" (Live)	Nirvana	7. Guitarhenge	Grunge	Yes
1981	"Lonely Is the Night"	Billy Squier	7. Guitarhenge	Rock	Yes
1983	"Looks That Kill"	Mötley Crüe	6. The Aqueduct	Heavy Metal	Yes
1993	"Lust for Life" (Live)	Iggy Pop	13. Fjord of Swords	Garage Rock	Yes
2008	"Maiden, Mother & Crone"	The Sword	10. Calavera Square	Stoner Rock	Yes
2007	"Make It wit Chu"	Queens of the Stone Age	5. O'Connell's Corner	Blues Rock	Yes
2009	"Medicate"^{+}	AFI	11. Cairo Bazaar	Alternative	Yes
2008	"Mirror People"	Love and Rockets	4. Angel's Crypt	Alternative	Yes
1992	"Nearly Lost You"	Screaming Trees	7. Guitarhenge	Grunge	No
2008	"Never Miss a Beat"	Kaiser Chiefs	4. Angel's Crypt	Indie Rock	Yes
1993	"No One to Depend On"^{+} (Live)	Santana	10. Calavera Square	Classic Rock	Yes
2003	"One Big Holiday"	My Morning Jacket	9. Electric Honky Tonk	Indie Rock	Yes
1995	"Only Happy When It Rains"	Garbage	2. Club Boson	Alternative	Yes
1976	"Play That Funky Music"	Wild Cherry	3. Sideshow	Funk Rock	No
2001	"Plug In Baby"	Muse	5. O'Connell's Corner	Alternative	No
1963	"Ring of Fire"	Johnny Cash	9. Electric Honky Tonk	Country	Yes
2001	"The Rock Show"	Blink-182	6. The Aqueduct	Pop Punk	Yes
1989	"Runnin' Down a Dream"	Tom Petty	10. Calavera Square	Heartland Rock	No
1973	"Saturday Night's Alright for Fighting"	Elton John	11. Cairo Bazaar	Classic Rock	Yes
2008	"Scatterbrain"^{+}^{a} (Live)	Jeff Beck	13. Fjord of Swords	Prog Rock	Yes
2008	"Send a Little Love Token"	The Duke Spirit	4. Angel's Crypt	Alternative	Yes
1994	"Seven"	Sunny Day Real Estate	8. Neon Oasis	Alternative	Yes
2008	"Sex on Fire"	Kings of Leon	3. Sideshow	Alternative	No
1976	"Shout It Out Loud"	Kiss	4. Angel's Crypt	Classic Rock	Yes
2008	"Six Days a Week"	The Bronx	12. The Golden Gate	Punk	Yes
1991	"Smells Like Teen Spirit"	Nirvana	7. Guitarhenge	Grunge	Yes
2008	"Sneak Out"	Rose Hill Drive	11. Cairo Bazaar	Blues Rock	Yes
1978	"So Lonely"	The Police	10. Calavera Square	Reggae Rock	Yes
1997	"Song 2"	Blur	1. The 13th Rail	Alternative	No
2006	"Sowing Season (Yeah)"	Brand New	2. Club Boson	Indie Rock	Yes
1980	"The Spirit of Radio"^{+} (Live)	Rush	13. Fjord of Swords	Prog Rock	Yes
2006	"Steady, As She Goes"	The Raconteurs	2. Club Boson	Blues Rock	Yes
2006	"Streamline Woman"	Gov't Mule	11. Cairo Bazaar	Southern Rock	Yes
1978	"Sultans of Swing"	Dire Straits	5. O'Connell's Corner	Classic Rock	Yes
1972	"Superstition"	Stevie Wonder	5. O'Connell's Corner	Funk	Yes
1992	"Sweating Bullets"^{+}	Megadeth	13. Fjord of Swords	Heavy Metal	Yes
1968	"Sympathy for the Devil"	The Rolling Stones	1. The 13th Rail	Blues Rock	Yes
2008	"They Say"	Scars on Broadway	1. The 13th Rail	Hard Rock	Yes
1982	"Under Pressure"	Queen and David Bowie	3. Sideshow	Rock	No
2008	"Wannabe in L.A."	Eagles of Death Metal	7. Guitarhenge	Garage Rock	Yes
1973	"We're an American Band"	Grand Funk Railroad	9. Electric Honky Tonk	Classic Rock	Yes
1996	"What I Got"	Sublime	8. Neon Oasis	Alternative	Yes
1996	"Why Bother?"	Weezer	6. The Aqueduct	Pop Punk	No
2006	"Wolf Like Me"	TV on the Radio	10. Calavera Square	Alternative	Yes
1999	"Woman From Tokyo" ('99 Remix)	Deep Purple	3. Sideshow	Hard Rock	Yes
2008	"You and Me"	Attack! Attack!	5. O'Connell's Corner	Pop Rock	Yes
1986	"You Give Love a Bad Name"	Bon Jovi	5. O'Connell's Corner	Hard Rock	Yes
1998	"Younk Funk"^{a}	The Derek Trucks Band	11. Cairo Bazaar	Funk	Yes

^a Song does not contain parts for one or more instruments.
^+ Song contains both a single and double bass drums chart.

== Importable content ==
On release of Guitar Hero 5, 35 of the songs from World Tour and 21 from Smash Hits are importable into Guitar Hero 5 for a small fee (approximately $0.10 per song), and are treated as downloadable content for the game playable in all game modes; the World Tour export was available on release, while the Smash Hits export was available a few days afterwards. Furthermore, 61 of the 65 tracks from Band Hero are importable into Guitar Hero 5. All transferred songs are also playable in Band Hero. However, Guitar Hero 5 is not backwards-compatible with World Tour. The transfer process requires the player to enter a unique code from the World Tour or Smash Hits manual to be able to redownload available songs in a pack (on the Xbox 360 or PlayStation 3) or individual songs (on the Wii) that have been updated to include the new features. Players on the Xbox 360 or PlayStation 3 can delete individual songs after downloading the pack. Some songs are not transferable because of licensing issues—not technical issues—according to Bright. Tim Riley, the head of music licensing at Activision, stated that the company will continue to seek licenses for more songs from previous games and downloadable content to be exported into Guitar Hero 5, but cannot guarantee that these songs will be licensed for future Guitar Hero games. While reviewers appreciated Activision's efforts to allow the importing of songs from previous games, they felt that the small number of tracks that were available at launch was at odds with the impression that Activision had made of the process before the game's release.

On September 28, 2010, 39 songs from Guitar Hero: Metallica were also made available to import. These were the last downloadable songs made available for Guitar Hero 5 and Band Hero before the move to Guitar Hero: Warriors of Rock ended the flow of DLC for those games.

== Downloadable content ==
Guitar Hero 5 supports downloadable content. However, on March 31, 2014, Activision removed all downloadable content and there is no evidence it will be available again.

The first songs were made available shortly after the game's release. In addition, 152 of the 158 available downloadable songs for Guitar Hero World Tour are forward-compatible with Guitar Hero 5 and Band Hero; the existing content is automatically upgraded to include all features new to these games and was immediately available to players upon release of Guitar Hero 5. Downloaded songs can be used in all game modes, provided all players have the song, including in the game's Career mode when players are given the option to select any song to play. The entire Guitar Hero 5 DLC library is also available in Band Hero, and vice versa, so both games embrace the same DLC library.

September 7, 2010 saw the release of the last track pack for Guitar Hero 5; All existing Guitar Hero 5 downloadable content is forward-compatible with Warriors of Rock, however, Warriors of Rock add-on content is not backward-compatible with Guitar Hero 5 and Band Hero.

Year	Song title	Artist	Pack name	Genre	Release date
1969	"Prodigal Son" (Live)	The Rolling Stones	The Rolling Stones Live Track Pack	Rock	September 3, 2009
1969	"You Gotta Move" (Live)	The Rolling Stones	The Rolling Stones Live Track Pack	Rock	September 3, 2009
1969	"Under My Thumb" (Live)	The Rolling Stones	The Rolling Stones Live Track Pack	Rock	September 3, 2009
1969	"I'm Free" (Live)	The Rolling Stones	The Rolling Stones Live Track Pack	Rock	September 3, 2009
1969	"(I Can't Get No) Satisfaction" (Live)	The Rolling Stones	The Rolling Stones Live Track Pack	Rock	September 3, 2009
2009	"100 Little Curses"	Street Sweeper Social Club	Street Sweeper Social Club Track Pack	Rock	September 10, 2009
2009	"Fight! Smash! Win!"	Street Sweeper Social Club	Street Sweeper Social Club Track Pack	Rock	September 10, 2009
2009	"Somewhere in the World It's Midnight"	Street Sweeper Social Club	Street Sweeper Social Club Track Pack	Rock	September 10, 2009
2009	"Beautiful Thieves"	AFI	AFI Track Pack	Pop Punk	September 17, 2009
2003	"Girl's Not Grey"	AFI	AFI Track Pack	Pop Punk	September 17, 2009
2006	"The Missing Frame"	AFI	AFI Track Pack	Pop Punk	September 17, 2009
2005	"Munich"	Editors	Yeah Yeah Yeahs/The Faint/Editors Track Pack	Indie Rock	September 24, 2009
2008	"The Geeks Were Right"	The Faint	Yeah Yeah Yeahs/The Faint/Editors Track Pack	Indie Rock	September 24, 2009
2009	"Dull Life"	Yeah Yeah Yeahs	Yeah Yeah Yeahs/The Faint/Editors Track Pack	Rock	September 24, 2009
1998	"Mexicola"	Queens of the Stone Age	Queens of the Stone Age Track Pack	Rock	October 1, 2009
1998	"Avon"	Queens of the Stone Age	Queens of the Stone Age Track Pack	Rock	October 1, 2009
1998	"How to Handle a Rope"	Queens of the Stone Age	Queens of the Stone Age Track Pack	Rock	October 1, 2009
1981	"The Stroke"	Billy Squier	Billy Squier Track Pack	Rock	October 8, 2009
1982	"Everybody Wants You"	Billy Squier	Billy Squier Track Pack	Rock	October 8, 2009
2009	"When She Comes to Me"	Billy Squier	Billy Squier Track Pack	Rock	October 8, 2009
2009	"Pilgrim"	Wolfmother	Wolfmother Track Pack	Alternative	October 15, 2009
2009	"California Queen"	Wolfmother	Wolfmother Track Pack	Alternative	October 15, 2009
2009	"Cosmic Egg"^{+}	Wolfmother	Wolfmother Track Pack	Alternative	October 15, 2009
1981	"Freeze Frame"	The J. Geils Band	Classic Rock 2 Track Pack	Classic Rock	October 22, 2009
1975	"Show Me the Way" (Live)	Peter Frampton	Classic Rock 2 Track Pack	Classic Rock	October 22, 2009
1979	"Lay It on the Line"	Triumph	Classic Rock 2 Track Pack	Classic Rock	October 22, 2009
1992	"Gor-Gor"^{+}	Gwar	All Hallows' Eve Track Pack	Metal	October 29, 2009
1996	"The Beautiful People"	Marilyn Manson	All Hallows' Eve Track Pack	Industrial	October 29, 2009
1982	"Astro Zombies"	Misfits	All Hallows' Eve Track Pack	Punk	October 29, 2009
1998	"Fly Away"	Lenny Kravitz	Lenny Kravitz Track Pack	Rock	November 12, 2009
2004	"Lady"	Lenny Kravitz	Lenny Kravitz Track Pack	Pop Rock	November 12, 2009
1989	"Let Love Rule"	Lenny Kravitz	Lenny Kravitz Track Pack	Rock	November 12, 2009
1979	"I Was Made for Lovin' You"	Kiss	Kiss Track Pack	Classic Rock	November 19, 2009
1983	"Lick It Up"	Kiss	Kiss Track Pack	Classic Rock	November 19, 2009
2009	"Modern Day Delilah"	Kiss	Kiss Track Pack	Classic Rock	November 19, 2009
2006	"Lemon Frosting"^{b}^{c}	Bunny Knutson	Neversoft Thanks the Fans Track Pack	Rock	November 24, 2009
2009	"RockNRola"^{b}^{c}	Nancy Fullforce	Neversoft Thanks the Fans Track Pack	Rock	November 24, 2009
2009	"From the Blue/Point of No Return/T.T.R.T.S"^{b}^{c}^{+}	An Endless Sporadic	Neversoft Thanks the Fans Track Pack	Progressive Rock	November 24, 2009
2009	"Love Holds It Down"^{b}^{c}	Dom Liberati	Neversoft Thanks the Fans Track Pack	Rock	November 24, 2009
2009	"You Really Like Me"^{b}^{c}	Davidicus	Neversoft Thanks the Fans Track Pack	Rock	November 24, 2009
2009	"Guilty Pleasures"^{b}^{c}^{+}	Tony Solis	Neversoft Thanks the Fans Track Pack	Progressive Rock	November 24, 2009
2009	"Panic Attack!"^{+}	The Fall of Troy	The Fall of Troy Track Pack	Alternative	December 3, 2009
2009	"A Classic Case of Transference"^{+}	The Fall of Troy	The Fall of Troy Track Pack	Alternative	December 3, 2009
2009	"Single"^{+}	The Fall of Troy	The Fall of Troy Track Pack	Alternative	December 3, 2009
2009	"All the Right Moves"	OneRepublic	OneRepublic Track Pack	Pop Rock	December 10, 2009
2009	"Everybody Loves Me"	OneRepublic	OneRepublic Track Pack	Pop Rock	December 10, 2009
2007	"Mercy"	OneRepublic	OneRepublic Track Pack	Pop Rock	December 10, 2009
2003	"Hi-Speed Soul"	Nada Surf	Indie Rock Track Pack	Indie Rock	December 17, 2009
1994	"Cut Your Hair"	Pavement	Indie Rock Track Pack	Indie Rock	December 17, 2009
2005	"Sister Jack"	Spoon	Indie Rock Track Pack	Indie Rock	December 17, 2009
2008	"Hark! The Herald Angels Sing"^{b}^{c}	Steve Ouimette	Single	Rock	December 22, 2009
2006	"Our Song"^{d}	Taylor Swift	Celebrity New Years Rock Track Pack	Country	December 22, 2009 ^{g}
2002	"Harder to Breathe"^{d}	Maroon 5	Celebrity New Years Rock Track Pack	Pop Rock	December 22, 2009 ^{g}
2000	"New"^{d}	No Doubt	Celebrity New Years Rock Track Pack	Pop Rock	December 22, 2009 ^{g}
2009	"Lonesome Road Blues"	Joe Bonamassa	New Blues Masters Track Pack	Blues	January 7, 2010
2009	"Who I Am"^{+}	Tyler Bryant	New Blues Masters Track Pack	Blues	January 7, 2010
2009	"Broken Man"	Scott McKeon	New Blues Masters Track Pack	Blues	January 7, 2010
2010	"Holiday"	Vampire Weekend	Vampire Weekend Track Pack	Alternative	January 14, 2010
2008	"The Kids Don't Stand a Chance"	Vampire Weekend	Vampire Weekend Track Pack	Alternative	January 14, 2010
2010	"Cousins"	Vampire Weekend	Vampire Weekend Track Pack	Alternative	January 14, 2010
2009	"Laser Cannon Deth Sentence"^{+}	Dethklok	Metal Track Pack	Death Metal	January 21, 2010
2009	"Still I Rise"^{+}	Shadows Fall	Metal Track Pack	Metal	January 21, 2010
2009	"Twilight of the Thunder God"^{+}	Amon Amarth	Metal Track Pack	Death Metal	January 21, 2010
1970	"Travelin' Band"	Creedence Clearwater Revival	Creedence Clearwater Revival Track Pack	Classic Rock	January 28, 2010
1969	"Bad Moon Rising"	Creedence Clearwater Revival	Creedence Clearwater Revival Track Pack	Classic Rock	January 28, 2010
1969	"Proud Mary"	Creedence Clearwater Revival	Creedence Clearwater Revival Track Pack	Classic Rock	January 28, 2010
2005	"Attack"	Thirty Seconds to Mars	30 Seconds to Mars Track Pack	Alternative	February 4, 2010
2005	"From Yesterday"	Thirty Seconds to Mars	30 Seconds to Mars Track Pack	Alternative	February 4, 2010
2009	"Kings and Queens"	Thirty Seconds to Mars	30 Seconds to Mars Track Pack	Alternative	February 4, 2010
2004	"Sooner or Later"	Breaking Benjamin	Breaking Benjamin Track Pack	Alternative	February 11, 2010
2006	"Until the End"	Breaking Benjamin	Breaking Benjamin Track Pack	Alternative	February 11, 2010
2009	"Give Me a Sign"	Breaking Benjamin	Breaking Benjamin Track Pack	Alternative	February 11, 2010
2009	"Can You Take Me"	Third Eye Blind	Third Eye Blind Track Pack	Alternative	February 25, 2010
1997	"Losing a Whole Year"	Third Eye Blind	Third Eye Blind Track Pack	Alternative	February 25, 2010
1999	"Never Let You Go"	Third Eye Blind	Third Eye Blind Track Pack	Alternative	February 25, 2010
2001	"First Date"	Blink-182	Blink-182 Track Pack	Pop Punk	March 4, 2010
1999	"All the Small Things"	Blink-182	Blink-182 Track Pack	Pop Punk	March 4, 2010
1999	"Adam's Song"	Blink-182	Blink-182 Track Pack	Pop Punk	March 4, 2010
2005	"Here It Goes Again"	OK Go	OK Go Track Pack	Pop Rock	March 11, 2010
2005	"Do What You Want"	OK Go	OK Go Track Pack	Pop Rock	March 11, 2010
2002	"Get Over It"	OK Go	OK Go Track Pack	Pop Rock	March 11, 2010
2008	"Requiem for a Dying Song"	Flogging Molly	Flogging Molly Track Pack	Punk	March 18, 2010
2008	"(No More) Paddy's Lament"	Flogging Molly	Flogging Molly Track Pack	Punk	March 18, 2010
2004	"The Seven Deadly Sins"	Flogging Molly	Flogging Molly Track Pack	Punk	March 18, 2010
1987	"Girls, Girls, Girls"	Mötley Crüe	80's Track Pack	Metal	March 25, 2010
1981	"We Got the Beat"	The Go-Go's	80's Track Pack	Pop Rock	March 25, 2010
1983	"Sister Christian"	Night Ranger	80's Track Pack	Rock	March 25, 2010
1973	"Free Bird"	Lynyrd Skynyrd	Lynyrd Skynyrd Track Pack	Southern Rock	April 1, 2010
1973	"Simple Man"	Lynyrd Skynyrd	Lynyrd Skynyrd Track Pack	Southern Rock	April 1, 2010
1973	"Gimme Three Steps"	Lynyrd Skynyrd	Lynyrd Skynyrd Track Pack	Southern Rock	April 1, 2010
2007	"Thnks fr th Mmrs"	Fall Out Boy	Fall Out Boy Track Pack	Pop Rock	April 8, 2010
2007	"This Ain't a Scene, It's an Arms Race"	Fall Out Boy	Fall Out Boy Track Pack	Pop Rock	April 8, 2010
2007	""The Take Over, the Breaks Over""	Fall Out Boy	Fall Out Boy Track Pack	Pop Rock	April 8, 2010
2008	"Gives You Hell"	The All-American Rejects	Mixed Singles 1	Pop Rock	April 15, 2010
1991	"There's No Other Way"	Blur	Mixed Singles 1	Alternative	April 15, 2010
2008	"Addicted"	Saving Abel	Mixed Singles 1	Rock	April 15, 2010
2005	"Everything Is Everything"	Phoenix	Phoenix Track Pack	Alternative	April 22, 2010
2009	"1901"	Phoenix	Phoenix Track Pack	Alternative	April 22, 2010
2009	"Lisztomania"	Phoenix	Phoenix Track Pack	Alternative	April 22, 2010
1971	"After Forever"	Black Sabbath	Black Sabbath Track Pack	Metal	April 29, 2010
1971	"Into the Void"	Black Sabbath	Black Sabbath Track Pack	Metal	April 29, 2010
1971	"Sweet Leaf"	Black Sabbath	Black Sabbath Track Pack	Metal	April 29, 2010
1981	"Juke Box Hero"	Foreigner	Classic Rock 3 Track Pack	Classic Rock	May 6, 2010^{e}
1976	"Sweet Home Alabama" (Live)	Lynyrd Skynyrd	Classic Rock 3 Track Pack	Southern Rock	May 6, 2010^{e}
1976	"Take the Money and Run"	Steve Miller Band	Classic Rock 3 Track Pack	Classic Rock	May 6, 2010^{e}
2010	"Face Down"	Alpha Rev	Alternative Pop 1 Track Pack	Alternative	May 11, 2010
2009	"Low Day"	Capra	Alternative Pop 1 Track Pack	Pop Rock	May 11, 2010
2006	"You're All I Have"	Snow Patrol	Alternative Pop 1 Track Pack	Alternative	May 11, 2010
1993	"Livin' on the Edge"	Aerosmith	Aerosmith Track Pack	Rock	May 18, 2010
1989	"Love in an Elevator"	Aerosmith	Aerosmith Track Pack	Rock	May 18, 2010
1987	"Rag Doll"	Aerosmith	Aerosmith Track Pack	Rock	May 18, 2010
2008	"7 Things"^{d}	Miley Cyrus	Band Hero 1 Track Pack	Pop	May 18, 2010^{f}
2009	"Here We Go Again"^{d}	Demi Lovato	Band Hero 1 Track Pack	Pop	May 18, 2010^{f}
2009	"Falling Down"^{d}	Selena Gomez & the Scene	Band Hero 1 Track Pack	Pop	May 18, 2010^{f}
2010	"Between the Lines"	Stone Temple Pilots	Stone Temple Pilots Track Pack	Alternative	June 1, 2010
1993	"Plush"	Stone Temple Pilots	Stone Temple Pilots Track Pack	Alternative	June 1, 2010
1992	"Sex Type Thing"	Stone Temple Pilots	Stone Temple Pilots Track Pack	Alternative	June 1, 2010
2010	"God Save the Queen"^{+} (GH Version)^{b}^{c}	Steve Ouimette	National Anthem Track Pack	Rock	June 8, 2010
2010	"Il Canto degli Italiani" (GH Version)^{b}^{c}	Steve Ouimette	National Anthem Track Pack	Rock	June 8, 2010
2010	"La Marseillaise" (GH Version)^{b}^{c}	Steve Ouimette	National Anthem Track Pack	Rock	June 8, 2010
2010	"Lied der Deutschen" (GH Version)^{b}^{c}	Steve Ouimette	National Anthem Track Pack	Rock	June 8, 2010
2010	"The Star-Spangled Banner" (GH Version)^{b}^{c}	Steve Ouimette	National Anthem Track Pack	Rock	June 8, 2010
1971	"I'm Eighteen"	Alice Cooper	Alice Cooper Track Pack	Hard Rock	June 15, 2010
1972	"School's Out"	Alice Cooper	Alice Cooper Track Pack	Hard Rock	June 15, 2010
1975	"Welcome to My Nightmare"	Alice Cooper	Alice Cooper Track Pack	Hard Rock	June 15, 2010
2007	"Dear Maria, Count Me In"	All Time Low	All Time Low Track Pack	Pop Punk	June 22, 2010
2009	"Weightless"	All Time Low	All Time Low Track Pack	Pop Punk	June 22, 2010
2010	"Damned If I Do Ya (Damned If I Don't)" (Live)	All Time Low	All Time Low Track Pack	Pop Punk	June 22, 2010
2009	"Fireflies"^{d}	Owl City	Pop 1 Track Pack	Electronic	June 29, 2010
2008	"Just Dance"^{d}	Lady Gaga (Feat. Colby O'Donis)	Pop 1 Track Pack	Dance	June 29, 2010
2002	"This Love"^{d}	Maroon 5	Pop 1 Track Pack	Pop Rock	June 29, 2010
1979	"Crazy Little Thing Called Love"	Queen	Queen 2 Track Pack	Classic Rock	July 6, 2010
1974	"Killer Queen"	Queen	Queen 2 Track Pack	Classic Rock	July 6, 2010
1976	"Somebody to Love"	Queen	Queen 2 Track Pack	Classic Rock	July 6, 2010
2007	"Afterlife"^{+}	Avenged Sevenfold	Avenged Sevenfold Track Pack	Metal	July 13, 2010
2007	"Almost Easy"^{+}	Avenged Sevenfold	Avenged Sevenfold Track Pack	Metal	July 13, 2010
2007	"Scream"^{+}	Avenged Sevenfold	Avenged Sevenfold Track Pack	Metal	July 13, 2010
2000	"Down With The Sickness"^{+}	Disturbed	Disturbed Track Pack	Nu Metal	July 20, 2010
2008	"Indestructible"^{+}	Disturbed	Disturbed Track Pack	Nu Metal	July 20, 2010
2005	"Stricken"^{+}	Disturbed	Disturbed Track Pack	Nu Metal	July 20, 2010
2008	"Devour"	Shinedown	Shinedown Track Pack	Alternative	July 27, 2010
2008	"Second Chance"	Shinedown	Shinedown Track Pack	Alternative	July 27, 2010
2008	"Sound Of Madness"	Shinedown	Shinedown Track Pack	Alternative	July 27, 2010
2002	"The Taste of Ink"	The Used	The Used Track Pack	Pop Rock	August 3, 2010
2007	"The Bird and the Worm"	The Used	The Used Track Pack	Pop Rock	August 3, 2010
2007	"Pretty Handsome Awkward"	The Used	The Used Track Pack	Pop Rock	August 3, 2010
2001	"Fat Lip"	Sum 41	Sum 41 Track Pack	Pop Punk	August 10, 2010
2001	"In Too Deep"	Sum 41	Sum 41 Track Pack	Pop Punk	August 10, 2010
2002	"Still Waiting"^{+}	Sum 41	Sum 41 Track Pack	Pop Punk	August 10, 2010
2005	"Beverly Hills"	Weezer	Weezer Track Pack	Pop Rock	August 17, 2010
2008	"Pork and Beans"	Weezer	Weezer Track Pack	Pop Rock	August 17, 2010
2001	"Island in the Sun"	Weezer	Weezer Track Pack	Pop Rock	August 17, 2010
1992	"Symphony of Destruction"	Megadeth	Megadeth Track Pack	Metal	August 24, 2010
1990	"Hangar 18"^{+}	Megadeth	Megadeth Track Pack	Metal	August 24, 2010
1986	"Peace Sells"^{+}	Megadeth	Megadeth Track Pack	Metal	August 24, 2010
2000	"Southtown"	P.O.D.	P.O.D. Track Pack	Pop Rock	August 31, 2010
2001	"Youth of the Nation"	P.O.D.	P.O.D. Track Pack	Rap Rock	August 31, 2010
2002	"Boom"	P.O.D.	P.O.D. Track Pack	Nu Metal	August 31, 2010
2003	"I Stand Alone"	Godsmack	Rock 1 Track Pack	Metal	September 7, 2010
2000	"Last Resort"	Papa Roach	Rock 1 Track Pack	Nu Metal	September 7, 2010
1998	"The Dope Show"	Marilyn Manson	Rock 1 Track Pack	Industrial	September 7, 2010
1998	"Blue Monday"	Orgy	Rock 1 Track Pack	Industrial	September 7, 2010
1999	"Nookie"	Limp Bizkit	Rock 1 Track Pack	Nu Metal	September 7, 2010
1989	"Epic"	Faith No More	Rock 1 Track Pack	Rock	September 7, 2010

^b Song is available at no cost.

^c Song is not available on Wii.

^d Song is based on Band Hero.

^e Song was released for the PS3 on May 11, 2010.

^f Song was released for the 360 and PS3 on May 25, 2010.

^gThis song is no longer available for download.
