= Failure (Breaking Benjamin song) =

Single by Breaking Benjamin

from the album Dark Before Dawn
- Released: March 23, 2015
- Genre: Alternative metal; post-grunge; hard rock
- Length: 3:35
- Label: Hollywood
- Songwriter: Benjamin Burnley
- Producer: Benjamin Burnley

Breaking Benjamin singles chronology
"Blow Me Away" (2010)	"Failure" (2015)	"Angels Fall" (2015)

Music video
- "Failure" on YouTube

"Failure" is a song by American rock band Breaking Benjamin. The song was released on March 23, 2015, as the lead single on the band's fifth studio album, Dark Before Dawn. The track marks the band's first release since the start of an extended hiatus entered upon in mid-2010, and is also the first recording to feature a different lineup alongside singer, writer, and guitarist Benjamin Burnley. The track is their third single to reach No. 1 on the Mainstream Rock Tracks chart, after "Breath" (2006) and "I Will Not Bow" (2009), and spent nine weeks there. On January 9, 2017, the single was certified Gold by the RIAA.

== Music ==
Loudwire's Chad Childers stated the song is "stylistically true" to the band's past content, and Dominique Kollie of Moargeek said "the song features the band's signature sound of metal-driven riffs coupled with soft hooks that maintain its angst-filled energy". At MusicSnake, it is stated as "sure to catch the interest of alternative rock fans". Metal Insider's Bran Teitelman associates the song with "the band's melodic mainstream hard rock".

== Release ==
On March 12, 2015, Breaking Benjamin released a 15-second teaser of "Failure", though its name was not confirmed until March 18, when it was formally announced via K-SHE '95. On March 23, it became available as an automatic download with the pre-order of Dark Before Dawn, but was also dispersed via rock radio and other media. A lyric video and official music video for the song was released via Vevo on May 15 and June 26, respectively.

== Personnel ==
Band

- Benjamin Burnley – lead vocals, rhythm guitar
- Jasen Rauch – lead guitar
- Keith Wallen – rhythm guitar, backing vocals
- Aaron Bruch – bass, backing vocals
- Shaun Foist – drums, percussion

Production

- Benjamin Burnley – composer, producer
- Ted Jensen – mastering
- Digital editing/engineering
  - John Bender
  - Jim Romano
  - Dan Korneff
- Mixing
  - Chris Lord-Alge
  - Ben Grosse
  - Keith Armstrong
  - Nik Harpen

== Charts ==
=== Weekly charts ===
Weekly chart performance for "Failure"
Chart (2015)	Peak position
Canada Rock (Billboard)	35
US Billboard Hot 100	80
US Hot Rock & Alternative Songs (Billboard)	8
US Rock & Alternative Airplay (Billboard)	6

=== Year-end charts ===
Year-end chart performance for "Failure"
Chart (2015)	Position
US Hot Rock Songs (Billboard)	32
US Rock Airplay (Billboard)	27

== Certifications ==
Certifications for "Failure"
Region	Certification	Certified units/sales
United States (RIAA)	Gold	500,000^{‡}
^{‡} Sales+streaming figures based on certification alone.
