= Ashes of Eden =

Ashes of Eden may refer to:

- The Ashes of Eden, a Star Trek novel
- "Ashes of Eden" (song), a 2016 song by Breaking Benjamin
- Ashes of Eden (novel) "Ashes of Eden: The Burden", a 2015 novel by Seven Everson
