= Run Like Hell (disambiguation) =

"Run Like Hell" is a song by Pink Floyd.

Run Like Hell may also refer to:

- Run Like Hell (video game), a third-person shooter video game
- "Run Like Hell" (The Black Donnellys), episode of The Black Donnellys
