= Dear Agony =

Studio album by Breaking Benjamin
- Released: September 29, 2009
- Recorded: September 2008 – March 2009
- Studio: House of Loud Studios (Elmwood Park, New Jersey)
- Genres: Alternative metal; post-grunge
- Length: 41:55
- Label: Hollywood
- Producer: David Bendeth

Breaking Benjamin chronology
Phobia (2006)	Dear Agony (2009)	Shallow Bay: The Best of Breaking Benjamin (2011)

Singles from Dear Agony
- 1. "I Will Not Bow" Released: August 11, 2009; 2. "Give Me a Sign" Released: January 5, 2010; 3. "Lights Out" Released: June 15, 2010

Dear Agony is the fourth studio album by American rock band Breaking Benjamin. It was released on September 29, 2009. A Best Buy edition, Japanese import version, and Zune exclusive version were also released, all of which feature bonus content. This is the first album to feature writing credits from members of the band other than Benjamin Burnley. It is also the final studio album to feature guitarist Aaron Fink and bassist Mark James Klepaski, who were both fired from the band in 2011, as well as drummer Chad Szeliga, who left the band due to creative differences in 2013.

== History ==
Breaking Benjamin began writing for Dear Agony during 2008. The recording process began in September, leading to its release one year later. The cover of the album is an MRI scan of frontman Benjamin Burnley's head. Burnley has cited Dear Agony as the first album he has written sober. After the album's release, it entered the Billboard 200 chart at number four, selling roughly 134,000 copies in its first week, slightly more than Phobia. It also topped the iTunes download charts in the first week of its release. Dear Agony was certified Platinum by the RIAA on July 11, 2016, and has sold 877,000 copies as of July 2016.

The album's song "Lights Out" was used to promote the video game Halo: Reach.

== Promotion ==
On September 23, 2009, Breaking Benjamin released an online browser game constructed from Adobe Flash which is a parody of Altered Beast, aptly titled "Altered Benjamin". The game contains three levels and plays the same as the original, except the player controls vocalist Benjamin Burnley and the three bosses are each other member of the band respectively. The game also features the debut of the songs, "Fade Away" and "Crawl".

Limited edition copies of Dear Agony purchased at Best Buy also included a bonus DVD that features the band's six music videos, including a previously unreleased version of the video for "I Will Not Bow". The version on the DVD is of the band only and does not contain any footage from the feature-film Surrogates, unlike the main version released online.

On September 29, 2009, "I Will Not Bow" was released as a downloadable track for the video games Rock Band and Rock Band 2. On February 16, 2010, "Give Me a Sign", another single of the album, as well singles from previous releases "Until the End" and "Sooner or Later" (being from Phobia and We Are Not Alone, respectively,) were released as downloadable content for Guitar Hero 5.

== Singles ==
"I Will Not Bow" was released for sale on August 31 as the album's first single. It was released to the radio and the band's Myspace page on August 11, 2009 instead of the planned date, August 17, 2009 due to a leak by their hometown radio station, WBSX. This single is featured in the film Surrogates, with the music video containing scenes from the movie. On November 13, 2009, the official music video for "I Will Not Bow" was released on YouTube. The original version of the music video, however, did not contain scenes from the movie Surrogates.

"Give Me a Sign" was released as a radio single on January 5, 2010. The music video was released on March 10, 2010 through the band's Myspace website and also on Vevo. The video can also be seen on YouTube.

According to AOL Radio Blog and Rawkpit.com, "Lights Out" was announced as the third single and it went to radio on June 15, according to All Access.

== Critical reception ==
Professional ratings
Review scores
Source	Rating
About.com	3/5 stars
AllMusic	2.5/5 stars
Consequence of Sound	F
Sputnikmusic	3.0/5

Dear Agony received mixed to positive reviews. Tim Grierson of About.com stated "Ultimately, Dear Agony demonstrates Breaking Benjamin's craftsmanship if not their brilliant creativity," but felt the release "[...] lacks something the truly excellent rock bands have – the ability to surprise the listener. James Christopher Monger from AllMusic noted that the band's "fourth foray into the crowded waters of early 21st century alternative metal/post-grunge feels a lot like their first three. That's good news for longtime fans of the brooding Pennsylvania quartet." Monger compared the album's sound to that of a "well-oiled machine". Consequence writer Alex Young panned the disc, saying "[...] the album as a whole feels dated and charmless," and that the anthology "[...] feels as if Breaking Benjamin just has not even bothered trying."

== Track listing ==
All tracks are written by Benjamin Burnley, except "I Will Not Bow", "Hopeless", "Lights Out" and "Without You" composed by Burnley and Jasen Rauch.

No.	Title	Length
1.	"Fade Away"	3:16
2.	"I Will Not Bow"	3:36
3.	"Crawl"	3:58
4.	"Give Me a Sign"	4:17
5.	"Hopeless"	3:20
6.	"What Lies Beneath"	3:34
7.	"Anthem of the Angels"	4:02
8.	"Lights Out"	3:33
9.	"Dear Agony"	4:18
10.	"Into the Nothing"	3:43
11.	"Without You"	4:18
Total length:		41:55

Japanese bonus tracks
No.	Title	Length
12.	"Without You" (acoustic)	3:42
13.	"Give Me a Sign" (acoustic)	4:16
Total length:		49:53

== Personnel ==
Production list acquired from AllMusic

Breaking Benjamin

- Benjamin Burnley – lead and backing vocals, rhythm guitar, arranging
- Aaron Fink – lead guitar
- Mark James Klepaski – bass
- Chad Szeliga – drums, percussion

Additional musicians

- Rachel Golub – violin on "Anthem of the Angels" and "Without You"
- David Eggar – cello on "Anthem of the Angels" and "Without You"
- Jonathan Dinklage – violin, viola on "Anthem of the Angels" and "Without You"

Production

- David Bendeth – producer, mixing (1–4, 7, 9–11), arranging
- Dan Korneff – engineer, digital editing, mixing (5, 6, 8), mix engineer
- Ted Jensen – mastering
- Jon D'Uva – digital editing, engineer
- John Bender – digital editing, engineer
- Kato Khandwala – digital editing, engineer
- Michael "Mitch" Milan – assistant engineer
- Jason Jordan – A&R
- Florian Schneider – photography
- David Snow – creative director

== Chart positions ==
=== Weekly charts ===
Weekly chart performance for Dear Agony
Chart (2009)	Peak position
Canadian Albums (Billboard)	13
New Zealand Albums (RMNZ)	22
US Billboard 200	4
US Top Alternative Albums (Billboard)	2
US Top Hard Rock Albums (Billboard)	1
US Top Rock Albums (Billboard)	1
US Indie Store Album Sales (Billboard)	2

=== Year-end charts ===
2009 year-end chart performance for Dear Agony
Chart (2009)	Position
US Billboard 200	118
US Top Rock Albums (Billboard)	31

2010 year-end chart performance for Dear Agony
Chart (2010)	Position
US Billboard 200	102
US Top Rock Albums (Billboard)	29

== Certifications ==
Certifications for Dear Agony
Region	Certification	Certified units/sales
United States (RIAA)	Platinum	1,000,000^{‡}
^{‡} Sales+streaming figures based on certification alone.
