= Lights Out (Breaking Benjamin song) =

Single by Breaking Benjamin

from the album Dear Agony
- Released: June 15, 2010
- Genre: Alternative metal
- Length: 3:34
- Label: Hollywood
- Songwriters: Benjamin Burnley; Jasen Rauch
- Producer: David Bendeth

Breaking Benjamin singles chronology
"Give Me a Sign" (2010)	"Lights Out" (2010)	"Blow Me Away" (2010)

"Lights Out" is a song by American rock band Breaking Benjamin. The song was released in June 2010 as the third single from their fourth album Dear Agony.

== Background ==
An interview with The Weekender, Ben talked about his writing with Jasen Rauch:

We had toured before, years ago, and he had given me a CD of early RED stuff. It was all just bits and pieces, it was really in the early stages. I loved it, I loved everything on it. Jasen and I are two of the same mind in a lot of ways, especially writing, and he just basically writes songs how I would like them to be written and writes songs that I would want to write myself. It started, and I did a song on the RED album, and we had, just in fun, worked on some other stuff and took it from there. Now, I consider him to be kind of my partner in crime and my writing partner and I definitely look forward to doing a lot more things with him in the future. He and I did four together. He did the outro of “I Will Not Bow” after the last chorus, he and I equally wrote “Without You,” he wrote the riff and some other things in a song called “Lights Out,” and he and I wrote “Hopeless.”

== Track listing ==
Promotional single
No.	Title	Length
1.	"Lights Out"	3:35
2.	"Lights Out"	3:35
3.	"Lights Out"	3:35
4.	"Short Research Hook"	0:12
5.	"Long Research Hook"	0:17

== Chart performance ==
"Lights Out" debuted at number 40 on the Mainstream Rock chart. It has also reached the Hot Rock Songs and Alternative Songs charts. AOL rated the song as the number-one alternative song of 2010.

=== Charts ===
Chart (2010)	Peak position
US Hot Rock Songs (Billboard)	21
US Alternative Songs (Billboard)	29
US Mainstream Rock (Billboard)	9
