= Avishai Rosen =

Israeli Jewish singer-songwriter

Avishai Rosen אבישי רוזן
- Born: Giv'at Shmuel, Israel
- Genres: Jewish rock; pop rock; soul; Hasidic pop (early)
- Instruments: Vocals, piano
- Years active: 2005–present
- Member of: 3Vocal
- Formerly of: Kinderlach

Avishai Rosen (Hebrew: אבישי רוזן) is an Israeli singer and songwriter. Beginning his career as a child with the boys choir Kinderlach, he switched to a solo career at age 12. He has released two solo albums, Ten Li Siman (2011) and Mi She'Ani Achshav (2016), the latter produced by Rami Kleinstein, and performs with the a capella trio 3Vocal.

== Biography ==
Raised in Giv'at Shmuel, Rosen began learning music at age 5 and started his career began at age 7 when he joined the Hasidic children's choir Kinderlach, with whom he recorded and performed for four years. He was later regularly featured on the Hidbarut TV channel. He attended school at Yeshivat Bnei Akiva in Giv'at Shmuel.

After leaving Kinderlach, Rosen decided to pursue a solo career at age 12. Rosen's debut single, "Ten Li Siman" (Give Me A Sign), was produced by Uriel Maor and Avi Tal (Aharon Razel, Udi Davidi) and premiered on Ynet in July 2011. He subsequently released the singles "Alfei Yeladim" and "GPS", as well as an a cappella cover of Chaim Israel's "Malachim", and performed live on Radio Kol Chai's "Saturday Night Music". His debut album, Ten Li Siman, released on November 28, 2011. In 2012, Rosen released a cover of Edna Lev's "Yoter" (More), which received play on Kol Yisrael's Network C, and the single "Ani Rotzeh La'uf" (I Want to Fly), which premiered on Ynet.

In February 2015, Rosen released "Tipot Shel Ruach" (Drops of Wind), the lead single from an upcoming second album produced by Rami Kleinstein. A music video for the song was released the following month, premiered on Ynet. Two more singles, "Hayiti Boreach" (I Was a Fugitive) and "Echzor" (I Will Return), preceded the album, Mi She'Ani Achshav (Who I Am Now), which released on February 9, 2016.

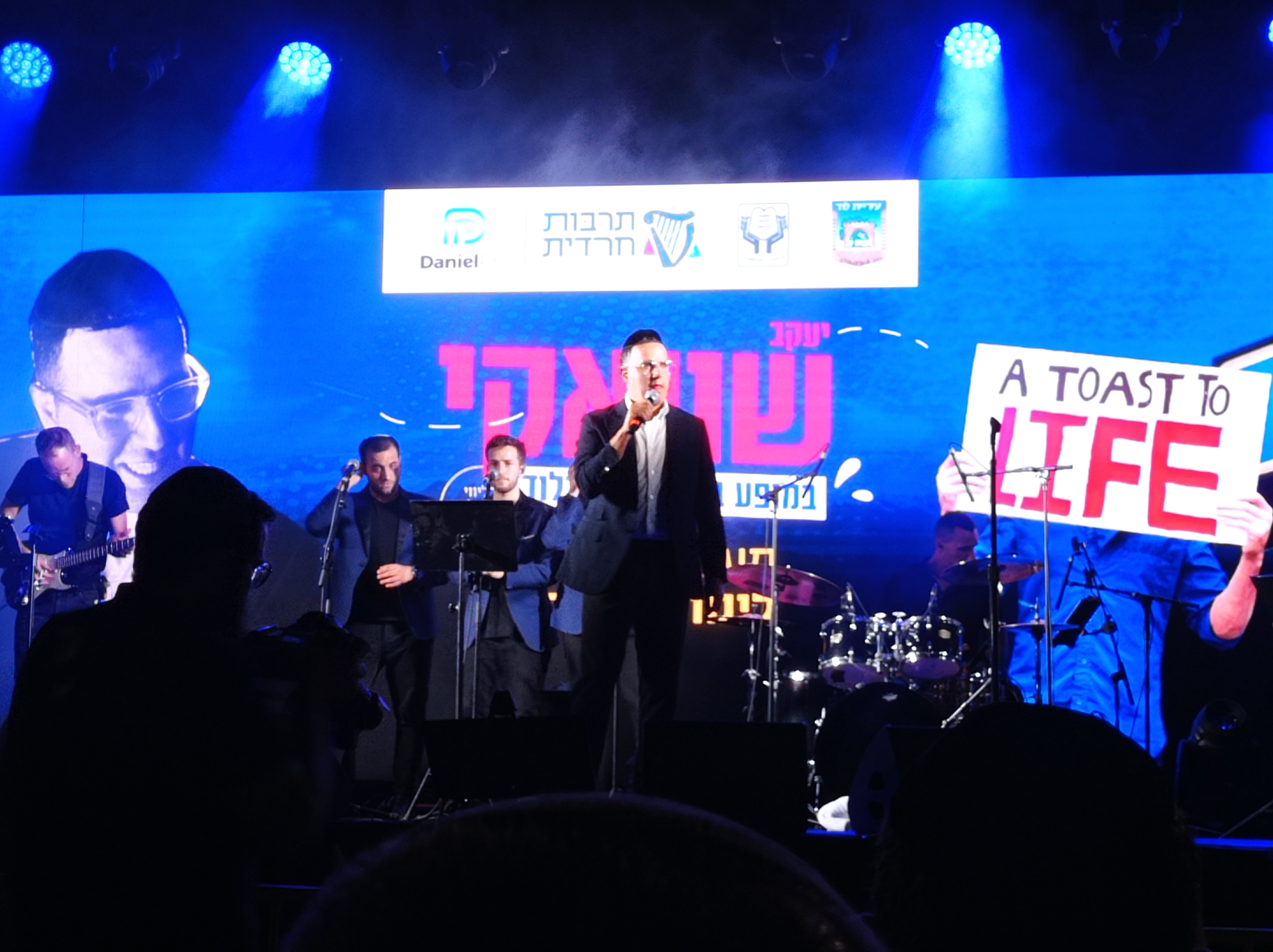
Rosen, to the left of Yaakov Shwekey, as part of 3Vocal in a 2021 concert in Lod.

In 2019, Rosen debuted the a capella trio 3Vocal, also composed of Rosen, cantor Shlomi Ben David, and tenor Orad Katz. In addition to their own singles, the group accompanied Shwekey and Kobi Peretz for a 2020 concert at Pais Arena in Jerusalem, part of the Ariel Winter Festival. That same year, Rosen released the solo single "Lama L'Milchama" (Why War?), dedicated to slain IDF soldier Amit Ben Yigal.

== Artistry ==
After leaving Kinderlach, Rosen's solo music took on a contemporary pop rock and soul sound. He is primarily influenced by Israeli artists including Eviatar Banai. His primary instrument is piano, which he has played since age 10; he also plays guitar, and played drums for three years as a child, including on Ten Li Siman. He later said that Ten Li Siman "provided a lot of learning for me", as he sat and watched the album's songwriter in action, enabling him to write all of his own songs for Mi She'Ani Achshav.

== Discography ==
=== Albums ===
- Ten Li Siman ("Give Me a Sign") (2011)
- Mi She'ani Achshav ("Who I Am Now") (2016)

==== Singles ====
- "Ten Li Siman" (Ten Li Siman; 2011)
- "Alfei Yeladim" ("Thousands of Children") (Ten Li Siman; 2011)
- "GPS" (Ten Li Siman; 2011)
- "Yoter" ("More") (2012)
- "Ani Rotzeh La'uf" ("I Want to Fly") (2012)
- "Yoter" (a cappella version) (2013)
- "Tipot Shel Ruach" ("Drops of Wind") (Mi She'ani Achshav; 2015)
- "Tipot Shel Ruach" (a capella version) (2015)
- "Hayiti Boreach" ("I Was a Fugitive") (Mi She'ani Achshav; 2015)
- "Echzor" ("I Will Return") (Mi She'ani Achshav; 2015)
- "Le'an" ("Where") (Mi She'ani Achshav; 2016)
- "Lama L'Milchama" ("Why War?") (2020)

=== Music videos ===
- "Ten Li Siman" (2011)
- "Alfei Yeladim" (2012)
- "Tipot Shel Ruach" (2015)
- "Hayiti Boreach" (2015)
- "Echzor" (2015)

=== With Kinderlach ===
- Kinderlach (2006)

=== Compilation appearances ===
- The Vocal Collection (2014; MRM Music) ("Yoter")
- The Vocal Collection 2 (2015; MRM Music) ("Malachim")
- The Vocal Collection 3 (2016; MRM Music) ("Tipot Shel Ruach")
