= Polyamorous (song) =

Single by Breaking Benjamin

from the album Saturate
- Released: July 16, 2002
- Genre: Alternative metal; pop metal
- Length: 2:56
- Label: Hollywood
- Songwriters: Benjamin Burnley; Aaron Fink; Jeremy Hummel; Mark Klepaski
- Producer: Ulrich Wild

Breaking Benjamin singles chronology
| "Polyamorous" (2002) | "Skin" (2003) |

Music videos
- "Polyamorous" on YouTube

"Polyamorous" is a song by American rock band Breaking Benjamin. It was released in July 2002 as the lead single from their debut album Saturate. The song reached number 31 on the US Billboard Alternative Songs chart and number 19 on the Mainstream Rock Tracks chart.

== Music videos ==
Two music videos were produced for "Polyamorous." The original version, directed by Gregory Dark, deals with a voyeuristic couple who, with the use of a joystick and various monitors for hidden cameras, are spying on other couples. The band is seen performing in the same chambers as these couples are as well as in a cage in a green, electric voltage effect as he sings. The voyeuristic couple continues to spy until they see themselves on the monitor and look behind themselves to see the same camera they use to spy. This is the version found on the Dear Agony Best Buy bonus DVD.

The second video, co-directed by Gregory Dark, for "Polyamorous" served as a promotional vehicle for the video game Run Like Hell: Hunt or Be Hunted. It features the same footage of the band performing in an empty swimming pool intercut with cinematic clips from the video game. The voltage effect on Burnley's eyes and mouth, is blue in this version. This version can be seen as a computer bonus feature on the Saturate CD.

== Critical reception ==
Chuck Taylor of Billboard said the song, "sounds almost like a throwback to the days when pummeling a performance into tatters was more the name of the game than a congenial vocal amid a wall of wailing guitars". In a 2011 review for Shallow Bay: The Best of Breaking Benjamin, The Daily Trojan stated that it was "a catchy pop-metal single" and that Burnley's "hard-rock style vocals blend well with the heavy guitar riffs".

== Appearances ==
"Polyamorous" appeared in various video games including Run Like Hell: Hunt or Be Hunted, WWE SmackDown! vs. Raw, WWE WrestleMania 21 and WWE Day of Reckoning. The track "Firefly" from We Are Not Alone is also in WWE Day of Reckoning, WWE SmackDown! vs. Raw and WWE Wrestlemania 21.

== Track listing ==
Promotional single No. 1
| No. | Title | Writer(s) | Length |
|---|---|---|---|
| 1. | "Polyamorous" | Benjamin Burnley; Aaron Fink; Jeremy Hummel; Mark Klepaski | 3:04 |
| 2. | "Call-Out Hook No. 1" | | 0:11 |
| 3. | "Call-Out Hook No. 2" | | 0:09 |

Promotional single No. 2
| No. | Title | Writer(s) | Length |
|---|---|---|---|
| 1. | "Polyamorous" | Benjamin Burnley; Aaron Fink; Jeremy Hummel; Mark Klepaski | 2:58 |
| 2. | "Shallow Bay (demo)" | Benjamin Burnley; Aaron Fink; Jeremy Hummel; Mark Klepaski | 4:03 |

== Charts ==
| Chart (2002) | Peak position |
|---|---|
| US Alternative Airplay (Billboard) | 31 |
| US Mainstream Rock Airplay (Billboard) | 19 |
