= Ashes of Eden (song) =

Single by Breaking Benjamin

from the album Dark Before Dawn
- Released: May 3, 2016
- Genre: Symphonic rock; post-grunge
- Length: 4:53
- Label: Hollywood
- Songwriter: Benjamin Burnley
- Producer: Benjamin Burnley

Breaking Benjamin singles chronology
"Defeated" (2015)	"Ashes of Eden" (2016)	"Never Again" (2017)

Music video
- "Ashes of Eden" on YouTube

"Ashes of Eden" is a song by American rock band Breaking Benjamin, released on May 3, 2016, as the fourth single on the band's fifth studio album Dark Before Dawn.

== Music video ==
The music video for the song was released in July 2016. Frontman Benjamin Burnley described the video as a "modern sci-fi take on Adam and Eve". He cited Gravity and Star Trek as influences, saying that he's "into that kind of stuff" and that "it's probably subconsciously affected [the video]".

== Charts ==
Reaching a peak of No. 18 on the Mainstream Rock chart, "Ashes of Eden" became Breaking Benjamin's fifth lowest-charting single to date there. Despite this, the single was certified Gold by the RIAA on February 6, 2020.

Chart (2016)	Peak position
US Hot Rock & Alternative Songs (Billboard)	36
US Mainstream Rock (Billboard)	18

== Certifications ==
Region	Certification	Certified units/sales
United States (RIAA)	Gold	500,000^{‡}
^{‡} Sales+streaming figures based on certification alone.
