= Dark Before Dawn =

Studio album by Breaking Benjamin
- Released: June 23, 2015
- Recorded: 2014
- Studios: 301 3rd St. Studios (Ocean City, New Jersey); The Barbershop Studios (Hopatcong, New Jersey)
- Genres: Hard rock; alternative metal; post-grunge
- Length: 42:42
- Label: Hollywood
- Producer: Benjamin Burnley

Breaking Benjamin chronology
Shallow Bay: The Best of Breaking Benjamin (2011)	Dark Before Dawn (2015)	Ember (2018)

Singles from Dark Before Dawn
- 1. "Failure" Released: March 23, 2015; 2. "Angels Fall" Released: April 14, 2015; 3. "Defeated" Released: May 12, 2015; 4. "Ashes of Eden" Released: May 3, 2016; 5. "Never Again" Released: January 20, 2017

Dark Before Dawn is the fifth studio album by American rock band Breaking Benjamin, released on June 23, 2015, by Hollywood Records. It is the group's first studio album following the band's hiatus lasting from early 2010 to late 2014, and the first album to feature an entirely different lineup alongside founder and frontman Benjamin Burnley. Produced and composed by Burnley, the album took shape towards the end of the hiatus and was mostly written before the new lineup "even played a single note together." The recording process took place afterwards at both a personal studio of Burnley's and at the same studio Phobia (2006) was recorded, with all of the band members performing their respective instruments, including background vocals performed by guitarist Keith Wallen and bassist Aaron Bruch, making the record their first to feature vocals other than Burnley's.

The album was a critical and commercial success. It garnered mostly positive reception, with many critics praising the album for staying true to the group's established sound, although others criticized it for sounding derivative and formulaic. Burnley described that he did not want to "reinvent the wheel" with the album. It debuted at number one on the Billboard 200, the group's first in their catalog, earning 141,000 album-equivalent units in its first week, making it heretofore the group's most successful sales effort. The album was released to much greater international chart success than previous albums; until Dark Before Dawn, the band had never charted outside North America or New Zealand. The album's lead single is "Failure", which was announced alongside the album on March 18, 2015.

== Background ==
Dark Before Dawn was the first album to not feature former guitarist Aaron Fink and bassist Mark James Klepaski. In early 2010, Benjamin Burnley announced he was too ill to perform, thereby putting the band on indefinite hiatus while he went through the medical system. Inter-band issues and legal battles ensued in 2011 after Fink and Klepaski allegedly granted permission unilaterally for the production of a greatest hits album and the release of a remix of the hit song "Blow Me Away" featuring Sydnee Duran of Valora. The two musicians were subsequently fired from the band and sued for punitive and compensatory damages. Fink and Klepaski's attorneys asserted that at issue was a 2009 agreement allowing Burnley to dismiss them for "cause", asserting it was no longer valid due to Burnley's status of indefinite hiatus while he was too ill to perform. After being ordered by a judge to arbitration, the issues were settled, announced in April 2013, as Burnley reserved the exclusive right to continue under the band name Breaking Benjamin. Shortly thereafter, drummer Chad Szeliga announced his departure from the band, citing creative differences.

The album began taking shape towards the end of the hiatus. Burnley stated that after growing frustrated with the lack of answers concerning his health condition, he decided to focus on writing music, saying on That Metal Show, "I literally took my medical records [...] and I slammed them down like, 'You know what, forget this, I'm not getting anywhere with this', so I just decided to stop trying to find out whatever it was and just focus on our music, and that's when Dark Before Dawn really started to take shape." After the album was mostly written, Burnley began assembling new members of the band, including Jasen Rauch (lead guitar; originally from Red), Keith Wallen (rhythm guitar and backing vocals; originally from Adelitas Way), Aaron Bruch (bass), and Shaun Foist (drums; originally from Picture Me Broken).

== Recording and production ==
Burnley has described that the album was "about 95 percent" written before the new lineup "even played a single note together." While Burnley remained the primary songwriter, Rauch wrote the intro and outro tracks, "Dark" and "Dawn", and also contributed to "Defeated" and "Never Again", the latter of which was also contributed to by Keith Wallen.^{:[1, 9, 12]} Burnley stated that while it was in 2014 that the record became cohesive, it was throughout the hiatus that he began creating new material. Recorded and produced in New Jersey at both 301 3rd Studios in Ocean City (a personal studio of Burnley's) and The Barbershop Studios in Hopatcong (the same studio with which Phobia was recorded in 2006),^{:13} Dark Before Dawn is the first album with Burnley credited as the producer. The singer elaborated:

"Listen, other people will give you their versions of things, and I can't help that, but I myself am entitled to my own version, and I would say that I did the same amount of producing on this album as I've done on other albums, just never had my name [on it]. So, that was basically a really conscious decision for me, to be like, 'You know, I'm not doing anything different here than I have done in the past. Why shouldn't I be known to be doing it? You know, why shouldn't I get the credit for something that I'm actually doing?' So I just basically did it, and I didn't tell anybody, whereas the process before was, I would tell people that I was getting ready to do it, then we would gear up to do it, and then people would get involved, and the credit would go wherever. So I just didn't tell a single soul I was doing it, I just did it in my own studio, and it was great."

Guitarist Keith Wallen and bassist Aaron Bruch performed all of the background vocals on Dark Before Dawn, unlike previous albums on which Burnley performed his own. Burnley stated that background vocals were worked on the most in regard to producing, elaborating on That Metal Show, "Because, guitars are guitars, you know, I mean, what are you gonna do, you can tune them and all these things, but singing is a totally different animal so that's where we spent a lot of time. Because when you're playing guitar you can kinda let your style come through, but if you're singing [along with] somebody you kind of have to sound like them for it to really gel, so they really altered, I guess their personality." Bruch added, "It's things like inflection, and vibrato, and making sure you bring it the same."

=== Music ===
For Dark Before Dawn, Burnley was the primary songwriter; the singer stating that "I don't want to reinvent the wheel. [...] I think fans are noticing that the band hasn't changed, because I'm the main songwriter, I always have been, and my process — it's not gonna change." The album has primarily been described as hard rock, alternative metal, and post-grunge. M.K. Sealy from MusicSnake said of the music, "For those who have enjoyed Breaking Benjamin's previous albums, the sound of Dark Before Dawn will be unsettlingly familiar. As a whole, Dark Before Dawn feels and sounds as if the band has fine-tuned Phobia, some of the instrumentation making the listener pause and consider if they've heard the song on a previous album. Regardless of its familiarity, Dark Before Dawn offers [listeners] an incredible, lyrical journey, and the album is thoroughly enjoyable."

According to Chad Childers of Loudwire, the subject matter of the song is about "overcoming obstacles and standing on your own."

== Promotion and release ==
"Failure"
Sample of the album's lead single "Failure" as released on March 20, 2015.

On March 18, 2015, both the album and its lead single "Failure" were announced for release on June 23 and March 23, respectively. The album's second and third singles, "Angels Fall" and "Defeated", were released on April 14 and May 12, respectively. Prior to the album's release, in April 2015, the band went on a short North American tour with English alternative rock band Young Guns, who were also promoting their 2015 album Ones and Zeros. The album was streamed early on June 16 via iTunes First Play. The fourth single, "Ashes of Eden", was released in 2016. A video was released for it in July 2016.

== Critical reception ==
Professional ratings
Review scores
Source	Rating
About.com	3.5/5 stars
AllMusic	3/5 stars
Alternative Addiction	4.5/5 stars
The Citizens' Voice	positive
Melodic	4/5 stars
Revolver	3/5
SF Weekly	negative
Ultimate Guitar Archive	7.6/10
Punk News	1.5/5

The album received generally positive critical reception, with many critics praising the band for staying true to their usual sound, though others have criticized the album for being too similar to their previous work. It received a positive review from AllMusic's James Monger, noting that "as thick, smartly-produced, largely inoffensive blasts of generic hard rock go, you could do a lot worse, and longtime fans will appreciate the fact that Burnley and his new shipmates stay true to the band's unwavering allegiance to all things late-'90s/early-2000s post-grunge/hard rock", but also adding that "it's hard to conceal the fact that most of these songs are nearly interchangeable with the band's older material." Tom Spinelli at Melodic praised the album as staying true to the sound of their previous material, stating "Overall this album is everything you would expect and more from the band. Breaking Benjamin is one of those bands that shouldn't really change their sound, they don't need to."

The Citizens' Voice writer Kristen Gaydos gave the album a positive review, stating that "Dark Before Dawn falls in nicely with the band's back catalog, laying the groundwork for the band's second era." SF Weekly writer Matt Saincome gave the disc a negative review, saying, "The only reprieve on this album comes in the form of track 10, "Ashes of Eden," an acoustic love song that is functional, palatable, and proves that it's the stylistic choices that make the rest of Dark Before Dawn unbearable to anyone with a halfway decent music taste."

== Commercial performance ==
Dark Before Dawn debuted at number one on the US Billboard 200 chart, earning 141,000 album-equivalent units in its first week of release. 135,000 of that total were pure album sales. It is the first Billboard 200 chart-topping release of the band's career. By July 2016, Dark Before Dawn had sold over 360,000 copies in the United States. On August 29, 2016, Dark Before Dawn was certified Gold by the RIAA.

== Track listing ==
Writing credits adapted from album booklet liner notes.

All tracks are written by Benjamin Burney, except where noted.

No.	Title	Writer(s)	Length
1.	"Dark"	Jasen Rauch	2:10
2.	"Failure"		3:34
3.	"Angels Fall"		3:48
4.	"Breaking the Silence"		3:01
5.	"Hollow"		3:51
6.	"Close to Heaven"		4:09
7.	"Bury Me Alive"		4:04
8.	"Never Again"	Burnley; Keith Wallen; Rauch	3:43
9.	"The Great Divide"		4:12
10.	"Ashes of Eden"		4:53
11.	"Defeated"	Burnley; Rauch	3:25
12.	"Dawn"	Rauch	1:52
Total length:			42:42

== Personnel ==
Personnel adapted from album booklet liner notes.

Breaking Benjamin

- Benjamin Burnley – lead vocals, rhythm guitar, string arrangements on "Ashes of Eden"
- Keith Wallen – rhythm guitar, backing vocals
- Jasen Rauch – lead guitar
- Aaron Bruch – bass, backing vocals
- Shaun Foist – drums

Additional musicians

- Rhiannon Burnley – backing vocals on "Dawn"
- Dave Eggar – cello on "Ashes of Eden"
- Katie Kresek – violin on "Ashes of Eden"

Management

- Rich Egan for Hard 8 Management
- Jordan Feldstein, Adam Harrison, and John Scholz for Career Artist Management
- Matthew Bonney and Maggie Cusimano for Citrin Cooperman – business management
- David Byrnes for Ziffren Brittenham LLP – legal
- Andy Somers for APA – booking

Production

- Benjamin Burnley – producer, engineer, digital editing, recording, orchestration on "Ashes of Eden"
- Dave Eggar – orchestration on "Ashes of Eden"
- Chuck Palmer – orchestration on "Ashes of Eden"
- John Bender – engineering, digital editing, recording
- Dan Korneff – engineering, digital editing
- Jim Romano – engineering, digital editing
- Ben Grosse – mixing for "Dark", "Breaking the Silence", "Hollow", "Close to Heaven", "Bury Me Alive", "The Great Divide", "Defeated", and "Dawn"
  - Paul Pavao – additional assistance
- Chris Lord-Alge – mixing for "Failure", "Angels Fall", "Never Again", and "Ashes of Eden"
  - Keith Armstrong, Nik Harpen – additional mix engineering
  - Adam Chagnon – additional assistance
- Ted Jensen – mastering

Artwork

- Tom Jermann for t42design – art direction and design
- Nicole Napier – cover art and interior photography

== Charts ==
=== Weekly charts ===
2015 weekly chart performance for Dark Before Dawn
Chart (2015)	Peak position
Australian Albums (ARIA)	11
Austrian Albums (Ö3 Austria)	49
Belgian Albums (Ultratop Flanders)	113
Canadian Albums (Billboard)	1
Dutch Albums (Album Top 100)	66
German Albums (Offizielle Top 100)	34
New Zealand Albums (RMNZ)	11
Scottish Albums (OCC)	30
Swiss Albums (Schweizer Hitparade)	66
UK Albums (Official Charts)	34
UK Album Downloads (Official Charts)	23
UK Rock & Metal Albums (OCC)	3
US Billboard 200	1
US Top Alternative Albums (Billboard)	1
US Top Rock Albums (Billboard)	1
US Top Hard Rock Albums (Billboard)	1
US Digital Albums (Billboard)	1
US Indie Store Album Sales (Billboard)	2

2025 weekly chart performance for Dark Before Dawn
Chart (2025)	Peak position
Greek Albums (IFPI)	70

=== Year-end charts ===
Year-end chart performance for Dark Before Dawn
Chart (2015)	Position
US Billboard 200	81
US Top Rock Albums (Billboard)	10

Chart (2016)	Position
US Top Rock Albums (Billboard)	47

=== Single chart ===
Defeated (2015)	Peak position
US Hot Rock & Alternative Songs (Billboard)	23

== Certifications ==
Certifications for Dark Before Dawn
Region	Certification	Certified units/sales
United States (RIAA)	Gold	500,000^{‡}
^{‡} Sales+streaming figures based on certification alone.
