= Phobia (Breaking Benjamin album) =

Studio album by Breaking Benjamin
- Released: August 8, 2006
- Recorded: March–May 2006
- Studio: The Barbershop Studios (Hopatcong, New Jersey)
- Genres: Alternative metal; post-grunge; hard rock
- Length: 43:30
- Label: Hollywood
- Producer: David Bendeth

Breaking Benjamin chronology
We Are Not Alone (2004)	Phobia (2006)	Dear Agony (2009)

Singles from Phobia
- 1. "The Diary of Jane" Released: June 6, 2006; 2. "Breath" Released: January 9, 2007; 3. "Until the End" Released: October 2, 2007

Alternative cover
- EMI import cover

Phobia is the third studio album by American rock band Breaking Benjamin. It was recorded at The Barbershop Studios in Hopatcong, New Jersey, and released on August 8, 2006, through Hollywood Records.

== Overview ==
Phobia was released on August 8, 2006. The album sold 131,000 copies in its first week, which made it the fastest selling and highest charting Breaking Benjamin album (until 2015's Dark Before Dawn), hitting number two on the US Billboard 200. This is the first studio album Chad Szeliga recorded with the band. The intro track features the sound effects of an airport, namely a flight attendant announcing standard safety procedures and the sound of an airplane making its ascent, alluding to Benjamin Burnley's fear of flying, hence the inspiration for the album name, Phobia.

The album re-entered the US Billboard 200 at number 38 on May 5, 2007, with its reissue. The album was certified platinum by the RIAA, gold by the RMNZ and silver by the BPI, making it their most successful album in terms of sales internationally.

== Reception ==
Professional ratings
Review scores
Source	Rating
AllMusic	3.5/5 stars
Entertainment Weekly	C+
IGN	7.5/10 stars
Robert Christgau	(dud)
Sputnikmusic	3.5/5

Phobia received generally mixed reviews. Corey Apar of AllMusic called the album "nothing if not consistent" with their past material, concluding "Phobia will not win over any skeptics still holding out on the band, but for those already happily settled in the Benjamin camp, it makes for another satisfying listen". Simon K. of Sputnikmusic was more critical, stating "There are a couple of songs on here that are easily forgettable and lack any real substance from the vocal side of things, and because the music behind it is keeping vocals in mind, the song suffers because of it", though also felt that "[...] it's still a very enjoyable album". Entertainment Weekly criticized the disc's dark tone, saying almost every song was "[...] a cry in the darkness of a cruel world", but praised its "[...] expansive choruses and epic riffs".

== Track listing ==
All tracks are written by Benjamin Burnley, with additional writers where noted.

Standard edition
No.	Title	Writer(s)	Length
1.	"Intro"	Aaron Fink; Mark James Klepaski	1:13
2.	"The Diary of Jane"	Fink; Klepaski	3:20
3.	"Breath"	Klepaski	3:38
4.	"You"		3:21
5.	"Evil Angel"	Klepaski	3:41
6.	"Until the End"	Fink; Klepaski	4:12
7.	"Dance with the Devil"	Klepaski	3:47
8.	"Topless"		3:03
9.	"Here We Are"		4:18
10.	"Unknown Soldier"		3:46
11.	"Had Enough"		3:50
12.	"You Fight Me"	Fink; Klepaski	3:12
13.	"Outro"	Fink; Klepaski	2:09
Total length:			43:30

Best Buy exclusive bonus track and Japanese bonus track
No.	Title	Writer(s)	Length
14.	"The Diary of Jane" (acoustic version^{1})	Fink; Klepaski	3:05
Total length:			46:35

EMI bonus tracks
No.	Title	Writer(s)	Length
14.	"The Diary of Jane" (acoustic version^{2})	Fink; Klepaski	3:05
15.	"So Cold" (acoustic version)	Fink; Jeremy Hummel; Klepaski	3:55
16.	"Rain (2005)"	Fink; Hummel; Klepaski; Billy Corgan	3:25
Total length:			57:00

^{1}The CD released with the Phobia collectors edition DVD also includes this track.

^{2}This track is not listed on the album's back insert. When played, it appears as track 14, making "So Cold" track 15 and "Rain" track 16.

=== Collectors edition DVD ===
No.	Title	Length
1.	"Intro"
2.	"Polyamorous"
3.	"Home"
4.	"Shallow Bay"
5.	"Topless"
6.	"Away"
7.	"The Diary of Jane"
8.	"Dance with the Devil"
9.	"Until the End"
10.	"Had Enough"
11.	"Sooner or Later"
12.	"Break My Fall"
13.	"So Cold"
14.	"Breath"
15.	"Evil Angel"

This DVD was released in April 2007 as part of the Phobia collectors edition CD and DVD package; it features the band's entire February 11, 2007 concert at Stabler Arena in Bethlehem, Pennsylvania.

== Song information ==
- "The Diary of Jane" is a hidden track (number 124) on the Hollywood Rip Ride Rockit roller coaster at Universal Studios Florida.
- According to lead singer Benjamin Burnley on the Phobia DVD, the track "Evil Angel" was one of the first songs he wrote for Phobia.
- The single "Until the End" is playable on Guitar Hero 5.

== Personnel ==
Credits adapted from album's liner notes.

Breaking Benjamin

- Benjamin Burnley – lead and backing vocals, rhythm guitar, arrangement
- Aaron Fink – lead guitar
- Mark James Klepaski – bass
- Chad Szeliga – drums, percussion

Additional musicians

- Sebastian Davin (of Dropping Daylight) – piano and backing vocals (tracks 7, 12 and 14)
- David Eggar – cello (track 14)
- Scott Treibitz – cello arrangement (track 14)

Management

- Jason Jordan – A&R
- Larry Mazer and Tamra Feldman – management for Entertainment Services
- Nick Ferrara – legal for Serling Rooks
- Andy Somers – booking agent for The Agency Group
- Lic Wheeler – marketing

Production

- David Bendeth – producer, digital editing, arrangement, mixing (tracks 1, 13, and 14)
- Dan Korneff, John Bender – engineering, digital editing
- Kato Khandwala – digital editing
- Mark Rinaldi, Austin Briggs – assistant engineers
- Ben Grosse – mixing (tracks 3–11)
- Paul Pavao – assistant mixing (tracks 3–11)
- Chris Lord-Alge – mixing (track 2)
- Keith Armstrong and Dim-E – assistant mixing (track 2)
- Ted Jensen – mastering

Artwork

- T42design – art direction and design
- Kamil Vojnar – cover artwork at Getty Images
- Phil Mucci, Prem Prakash Sahu, Dada Jayela – photography

== Charts ==
=== Weekly charts ===
Weekly chart performance for Phobia
Chart (2006)	Peak position
Canadian Albums (Nielsen SoundScan)	22
New Zealand Albums (RMNZ)	16
US Billboard 200	2
US Indie Store Album Sales (Billboard)	3
US Top Hard Rock Albums (Billboard)	18
US Top Rock Albums (Billboard)	1

=== Year-end charts ===
2006 year-end chart performance for Phobia
Chart (2006)	Position
US Billboard 200	171

2007 year-end chart performance for Phobia
Chart (2007)	Position
US Billboard 200	127

== Certifications ==
Certifications for Phobia
Region	Certification	Certified units/sales
New Zealand (RMNZ)	Gold	7,500^{‡}
United Kingdom (BPI)	Silver	60,000^{‡}
United States (RIAA)	Platinum	1,000,000^{^}
^{^} Shipments figures based on certification alone.^{‡} Sales+streaming figures based on certification alone.

== Release history ==
Region	Date	Label	Format
United Kingdom	August 7, 2006	Hollywood	CD; digital download
United States	August 8, 2006	Hollywood	CD; digital download
Japan	August 18, 2006	Hollywood	CD; digital download
Australia	October 7, 2006	Hollywood	CD; digital download
Malaysia	October 9, 2006	Hollywood	CD; digital download
Philippines	October 9, 2006	Hollywood	CD; digital download
Thailand	October 9, 2006	Hollywood	CD; digital download
United States	April 17, 2007 (Collectors edition)	Hollywood	CD; digital download
