= Saturate (Breaking Benjamin album) =

Studio album by Breaking Benjamin
- Released: August 27, 2002
- Recorded: April–May 2002
- Studios: Larrabee East (Los Angeles); Royaltone Studios (Los Angeles)
- Genres: Post-grunge; nu metal
- Length: 49:12
- Label: Hollywood
- Producer: Ulrich Wild

Breaking Benjamin chronology
Breaking Benjamin (2001)	Saturate (2002)	We Are Not Alone (2004)

Singles from Saturate
- 1. "Polyamorous" Released: July 16, 2002; 2. "Skin" Released: February 18, 2003; 3. "Medicate" Released: May 6, 2003

Professional ratings
Review scores
Source	Rating
AllMusic	2.5/5 stars
Bullz-Eye	3.5/5 stars

Saturate is the debut studio album by American rock band Breaking Benjamin. It was released on August 27, 2002. The album features three singles, including "Polyamorous", "Skin", and "Medicate". The album was certified gold by the RIAA on September 15, 2015.

== Background ==
After the commercial success of the band's lead single "Polyamorous", the band released their debut self-titled five-track EP, financed by a local radio DJ who had led the single to success. Following their signing to Hollywood Records, there was a dispute between the band and the label on deciding on which single to release next for their debut studio album. The band wished for "Medicate", while the label insisted on releasing "Skin" as a single. Eventually, the label decided to go with "Skin", despite some negative feedback with the band and the fairly poor success it reached. The original release of Saturate contained "Forever" as a separate track; also, the newer enhanced versions came with the "Polyamorous" music video and ultimately featured the song embedded with "Shallow Bay".

The album title is derived from a lyric in the song "Wish I May".

On September 14, 2002, Saturate peaked on the US Billboard 200 and Heatseekers charts at number 136 and number two, respectively. "Wish I May" was featured in the horror films Wrong Turn and The Apparition, starring Tom Felton. The tracks "Home", "Shallow Bay", "Water", and "Polyamorous" were also featured in the 2002 horror game Run Like Hell.

There were also plans for a European release of the album containing the song "Lady Bug" and the Depeche Mode cover of "Enjoy the Silence," but this version of Saturate was never released in Europe, and as a result, neither track was released for the album. "Lady Bug" later appeared on their So Cold EP and on the deluxe edition of their greatest hits compilation album Shallow Bay: The Best of Breaking Benjamin. "Enjoy the Silence" appeared on the compilation in the same version. The album was eventually released in Europe in 2006, but these tracks still were not included.

Musically, the album's sound is lighter compared to the band's later work and parts of the album fall into nu metal territory.

== Track listing ==
All lyrics are written by Benjamin Burnley; all music is composed by Benjamin Burnley, Aaron Fink, Mark Klepaski and Jeremy Hummel.

No.	Title	Length
1.	"Wish I May"	3:58
2.	"Medicate"	3:45
3.	"Polyamorous"	2:56
4.	"Skin"	3:20
5.	"Natural Life"	3:59
6.	"Next to Nothing"	3:43
7.	"Water"	4:12
8.	"Home"	3:37
9.	"Phase"	4:30
10.	"No Games"	3:35
11.	"Sugarcoat"	3:38
12.	"Shallow Bay"	4:05
13.	"Forever"	3:54
Total length:		49:12

Later release hidden track
No.	Title	Length
12.	"Shallow Bay" (contains hidden track "Forever", starting at 4:06, immediately following "Shallow Bay")	8:00
Total length:		49:12

== Personnel ==
Breaking Benjamin

- Benjamin Burnley – lead vocals, rhythm guitar, string arrangements
- Aaron Fink – lead guitar, vocals
- Mark James Klepaski – bass guitar, vocals
- Jeremy Hummel – drums, vocals

Management

- Jason Jordan – A&R

Artwork

- T42Design – art direction and album design
- Matthew Welch – band photography
- Dr. Lukas Altwegg – cell images

Production

- Ulrich Wild – producer, engineer
- Ted Regier – assistant engineer
- Alex Reverberi – assistant engineer
- Vocals recorded May 2002 at Royaltone Studios in North Hollywood
- Chris Wonzer – assistant engineering
- Bret Alexander – vocal production on "Water", and additional vocal production on "Shallow Bay" at Saturation Acres, Pennsylvania
- Paul Smith – vocal production on "Water", and additional vocal production on "Shallow Bay" at Saturation Acres, Pennsylvania
- Chris Lord-Alge – mixing at Image Recording Studios, Hollywood, California
- Stephen Marcussen – mastering at Marcussen Mastering
- Susie Katayama – string arrangements

== Chart positions ==
Album

Chart (2002)	Peak position
US Billboard 200	136
US Top Heatseekers (Billboard)	2

Singles

Year	Song	US Alt.	US Main.
2002	"Polyamorous"	31	25
2003	"Skin"	37	24

== Certifications ==
Region	Certification	Certified units/sales
United States (RIAA)	Gold	500,000^{^}
^{^} Shipments figures based on certification alone.
