= Skin (Breaking Benjamin song) =

Single by Breaking Benjamin

from the album Saturate
- Released: February 18, 2003
- Genre: Pop-punk
- Length: 3:25
- Label: Hollywood
- Songwriters: Benjamin Burnley; Aaron Fink; Jeremy Hummel; Mark Klepaski
- Producer: Ulrich Wild

Breaking Benjamin singles chronology
"Polyamorous" (2002)	"Skin" (2003)	"Medicate" (2003)

"Skin" is a song by American rock band Breaking Benjamin. It was released in February 2003 as the second single from the band's debut album, Saturate. The song charted on both Billboard's Hot Mainstream Rock Tracks and Alternative Songs, peaking at number 24 and number 37, respectively.

== Background ==
In an interview with Rock Star Tribune, frontman Benjamin Burnley stated:

"Skin" is a radio thing and it doesn't go over that great live. I mean, we play it good, but it's just the crowd, especially on a tour like this; we have to play our heaviest shit. So, it really doesn't fit in to that mix but it does well on the radio. It shows another side of what we can do.

The song has been performed twice on live television. The first performance was aired on March 14, 2003 on Last Call with Carson Daly and the second was aired on April 7, 2003 on The Late Late Show with Craig Kilborn.

== Charts ==
Chart (2003)	Peak position
US Alternative Airplay (Billboard)	37
US Mainstream Rock Airplay (Billboard)	24
