= Angels Fall (song) =

Single by Breaking Benjamin

from the album Dark Before Dawn
- Released: April 14, 2015
- Genre: Post-grunge; alternative metal
- Length: 3:49
- Label: Hollywood
- Songwriter: Benjamin Burnley
- Producer: Benjamin Burnley

Breaking Benjamin singles chronology
"Failure" (2015)	"Angels Fall" (2015)	"Defeated" (2015)

Music video
- "Angels Fall" on YouTube

"Angels Fall" is a song by American rock band Breaking Benjamin. Released soon after the album's lead single "Failure" on April 14, 2015, the track is the second single on their fifth studio album Dark Before Dawn and is the album's third track overall.

== Music ==
Loudwire writer Chad Childers said the song "has a more moody vibe in the verses until the power of Ben Burnley's voice adds a sense of urgency during the chorus, delivering a message about not giving up and not giving in to obstacles that may stand in your way". Benjamin Burnley said of the song after its release, "I don't want to reinvent the wheel. I just want to write good music that's gonna stand the test of time and I try to do that."

== Music video ==
The music video starts with a shot of dark ominous storm clouds then quickly transitions to an old underwater shipwreck. Throughout the song, the band is shown playing on a beach near a bonfire. Other scenes include survivors of the shipwreck dressed in 19th century apparel fighting on an island, implied to be ghosts of four people lost when the ship sank.

== Release ==
On April 11, 2015, Breaking Benjamin released a 37-second sample of "Angels Fall", announcing its release. On April 14, it was released as a follow-up to the album's lead single "Failure". On September 14, 2015, a music video was released for the song.

== Reception ==
"Angels Fall" was positively received by critics. Kristen Gaydos of The Citizens' Voice praised the "ominous introduction to the radio-friendly chorus". James Christopher Monger of AllMusic called the song one of the album's "standout cuts". Marcus Floyd of Renowned for Sound labeled the track as "both lyrically and sonically explosive with BB's trademark earthy sound". Nony Khondaker of The Daily Star commented on the catchy chorus, calling it the song's strongest part.

== Credits and personnel ==
Credits adapted from the liner notes of Dark Before Dawn.

- Performed by Breaking Benjamin
- Written by Benjamin Burnley
- Produced by Benjamin Burnley
- Recorded by John Bender and Benjamin Burnley at St. Studios, Ocean City, and The Barbershop Studios, Lake Hopatcong, New Jersey
- Audio engineering by John Bender, Dan Korneff, Jim Romano, and Benjamin Burnley
- Mixed by Chris Lord-Alge, Keith Armstrong, and Nik Karpen at Mix L.A., Tarzana, Los Angeles
- Mastered by Ted Jensen at Sterling Sound, New York City, New York

== Charts ==
=== Weekly charts ===
Weekly chart performance for "Angels Fall"
Chart (2015)	Peak position
US Hot Rock & Alternative Songs (Billboard)	16
US Rock & Alternative Airplay (Billboard)	11

=== Year-end charts ===
Year-end chart performance for "Angels Fall"
Chart (2015)	Position
US Hot Rock Songs (Billboard)	58

== Certifications ==
Certifications for "Angels Fall"
Region	Certification	Certified units/sales
United States (RIAA)	Platinum	1,000,000^{‡}
^{‡} Sales+streaming figures based on certification alone.
