= Madam Adam =

American rock band

Background information
- Origin: Charleston, South Carolina, United States
- Genres: Rock
- Years active: 2000's–present
- Labels: Independent (current); Roadrunner (former)
- Members: Scott Gould; Alan Price; Matt Reindollar; Kenny Varner
- Past members: Drew Reindollar

Madam Adam is an American rock band from Charleston, South Carolina, consisting of lead vocalist and guitarist Scott Gould, bassist Kenny Varner, lead guitarist and vocalist Alan Price, and drummer Matthew Reindollar.

== Self-titled debut album ==
MadamAdam signed a record deal with Roadrunner Records in late 2009 and began recording their self-titled debut album with producer Skidd Mills (Sick Puppies, Saving Abel) at the Sound Kitchen in Nashville, TN. That record released on April 5, 2011, and it would produce the band's first radio single, "Sex Ain't Love", an upbeat and hard-rocking song about the restless sexual tensions of today's young adults.

The band quickly made a name for itself with their captivating live performances. After some initial success from touring in support of headliners Halestorm and Sick Puppies and also seeing their single gaining traction on rock charts, MadamAdam came home to find that the world they were just stepping into was changing. After much deliberation and a lot of soul searching, the band and their label agreed to part ways.

== Rite of Passage ==
Following a brief hiatus and the subsequent recruiting of guitarist Alan Price (Shinedown, Call Me No One), MadamAdam got straight into writing for their next album. They realized they had a lot to say and wanted to get it all off their chest. By fall of 2013 they had amassed a group of songs that were taking shape as pieces of one overlying theme. A theme they would use to mirror what they saw reflecting back at them from the ever-changing music industry. The band partnered with producer J. Hall (Delta Saints) and writer/engineer Nickolas Blazina to work on what would become the band's sophomore release.

Over two week-long sessions in Nashville, TN, one in November 2013 and the other in February 2014 (the latter being funded with support from Indiegogo contributions), MadamAdam had brought to life the story of a world wrought in class warfare and civil disobedience - where those with less have to fend for themselves at the outskirts of society and with nowhere else to go but underground. Greed and money rule politics. Resentment and anger fuel an inevitable clash between right and wrong, good and evil. When the album had been fully realized and with the recording finished, the band knew there was only one logical title, 'Rite of Passage'.

== Members ==
Current members

- Scott Gould – lead vocals (2010–present)
- Alan Price – lead guitar (2013–present)
- Matt Reindollar – drums (2010–present)
- Kenny Varner – bass guitar (2010–present)

Former members

- Drew Reindollar – lead guitar (2010–2012)

== Discography ==
=== Studio albums ===
- Madam Adam (2011)
- Rite of Passage (2015)

=== Extended plays ===
- Madam Adam (EP) (2010)

=== Singles ===
Year	Single	Peak chart positions	Album
Year	Single	US Main.	Album
2011	"Sex Ain't Love"	38	Madam Adam
2015	"Please Don't"	-	Rite of Passage
