= Breath (Breaking Benjamin song) =

Single by Breaking Benjamin

from the album Phobia
- Released: January 9, 2007
- Recorded: 2006
- Length: 3:38
- Label: Hollywood
- Songwriters: Benjamin Burnley; Mark Klepaski
- Producer: David Bendeth

Breaking Benjamin singles chronology
"The Diary of Jane" (2006)	"Breath" (2007)	"Until the End" (2007)

Music video
- "Breath" on YouTube

"Breath" is a song by American rock band Breaking Benjamin. It was released in January 2007 as the second single from their third album, Phobia. It was the band's fourth charted song on the US Hot 100 overall, and the second from Phobia. Although "Breath" failed to capture the pop success of "The Diary of Jane" at No. 50 where "Breath" hit No. 84 on the Billboard Hot 100, it was more successful on the rock charts where it hit No. 1 on the US Mainstream Rock Tracks chart, making it Breaking Benjamin's first number-one hit, staying there for seven weeks where "The Diary of Jane" hit No. 2 and it also hit No. 3 on the US Modern Rock Tracks chart, tying with "So Cold" as their highest-charting single on the chart where "The Diary of Jane" hit No. 4. The single was certified double platinum by the RIAA in August 24, 2022 and gold by the RMNZ on February 13, 2025.

== Versions ==
The original version of "Breath" is the version off Phobia, which is 3:38 long. "Breath" also has a radio edit, which can be heard over public radio. The edit was mixed by Ian van Dahl. "Breath" was No. 6 on the top 40 mix edit charts of May 2008, at 3:13 long. Generally, most active rock, mainstream rock and alternative rock stations still play the original version as of today. A classical cover version of "Breath" by the Vitamin String Quartet is included on the album Strung Out – The String Quartet Tribute to Hard Rock Hits, Vol. 4.

== Track listing ==
All tracks are written by Benjamin Burnley and Mark Klepaski.

Promotional single No. 1
No.	Title	Length
1.	"Breath"	3:38
2.	"Breath"	3:38
3.	"Breath"	3:38

Promotional single No. 2
No.	Title	Length
1.	"Breath (top 40 mix, radio edit)"	3:13
2.	"Breath (top 40 mix, full-length version)"	3:38

Promotional single No. 3
No.	Title	Length
1.	"Breath (pop mix)"	3:16
2.	"Breath (album version)"	3:38

== Critical reception ==
Chuck Taylor of Billboard reviewed the song favorably, stating that its "foot-tapping beats and accessible melody are better appreciated when separated from its closely related siblings." He went on to say that the song has a "solid midtempo pace that peaks with another one of the band's climactic choruses."

== Charts ==
=== Weekly charts ===
Weekly chart performance for "Breath"
Chart (2007)	Peak position
Canada Hot 100 (Billboard)	87
Canada Rock (Billboard)	8
US Billboard Hot 100	84
US Alternative Airplay (Billboard)	3
US Mainstream Rock Airplay (Billboard)	1

=== Year-end charts ===
Year-end chart performance for "Breath"
Chart (2007)	Position
US Alternative Songs (Billboard)	4
US Mainstream Rock Songs (Billboard)	4

== Certifications ==
Certifications for "Breath"
Region	Certification	Certified units/sales
New Zealand (RMNZ)	Gold	15,000^{‡}
United States (RIAA)	2× Platinum	2,000,000^{‡}
^{‡} Sales+streaming figures based on certification alone.
