= Sooner or Later (Breaking Benjamin song) =

Single by Breaking Benjamin

from the album We Are Not Alone
- Released: September 28, 2004
- Genre: Hard rock; post-grunge; nu-metal
- Length: 3:39 (album version); 3:24 (radio edit)
- Label: Hollywood
- Songwriters: Benjamin Burnley; Aaron Fink; Jeremy Hummel; Mark Klepaski
- Producer: David Bendeth

Breaking Benjamin singles chronology
"So Cold" (2004)	"Sooner or Later" (2004)	"Rain" (2005)

Music video
- "Sooner or Later" on YouTube

"Sooner or Later" is a song by American rock band Breaking Benjamin. It was released in September 2004 as the second single from their second album, We Are Not Alone.

== Commercial performance ==
The song reached number 2 on the Mainstream Rock chart, number 7 on the Alternative Songs chart and number 99 on the Hot 100. The song was performed live on The Tonight Show with Jay Leno, April 8, 2005.

As of February 11, 2010, "Sooner or Later" has been released as a downloadable content on Guitar Hero 5 as part of the Breaking Benjamin Track Pack DLC, along with two other singles: "Until the End" and "Give Me a Sign".

== Music video ==
A music video was made for "Sooner or Later". The music video featured the band playing in a small enclosed area surrounded by screens, showing clips of a woman going from place to place throughout the city of Toronto, Ontario, Canada. As she enters the room, the band is gone showing on the screens as they walk away.

== Composition ==
"Sooner or Later" has been described as hard rock, post-grunge, and nu-metal.

== Critical reception ==
Bram Teitelman of Billboard reviewed the song favorably, stating that while the song isn't instantly catchy, it is "nonetheless a commercial blast of hard rock that will continue to bolster the band's high profile."

== Track listing ==
Promotional single
No.	Title	Writer(s)	Length
1.	"Sooner or Later (radio edit)"	Benjamin Burnley; Aaron Fink; Jeremy Hummel; Mark Klepaski	3:24
2.	"Call-Out Hook"		0:11

== Charts ==
=== Weekly charts ===
Weekly chart performance for "Sooner or Later"
Chart (2005)	Peak position
Canada Rock Top 30 (Radio & Records)	28
US Billboard Hot 100	99
US Alternative Airplay (Billboard)	7
US Mainstream Rock Airplay (Billboard)	2

=== Year-end charts ===
Year-end chart performance for "Sooner or Later"
Chart (2005)	Position
US Mainstream Rock Tracks (Billboard)	15
US Modern Rock Tracks (Billboard)	29
