= I Will Not Bow =

Single by Breaking Benjamin

from the album Dear Agony
- Released: August 11, 2009
- Genre: Alternative metal
- Length: 3:37
- Label: Hollywood
- Songwriters: Benjamin Burnley; Jasen Rauch
- Producer: David Bendeth

Breaking Benjamin singles chronology
"Until the End" (2007)	"I Will Not Bow" (2009)	"Give Me a Sign" (2010)

Music videos
- "I Will Not Bow" on YouTube
- "I Will Not Bow" (Surrogates version) on YouTube

"I Will Not Bow" is a song by American rock band Breaking Benjamin. It was released on August 11, 2009 as the lead single from their fourth album Dear Agony. It was featured in the ending credits of the Bruce Willis film Surrogates. The song was not written specifically for the film, but according to drummer Chad Szeliga, "Ben sent a few songs to our record label, Hollywood Records," which is owned by Disney, who then decided they "wanted a Breaking Benjamin song for this movie." The song was also being used heavily on MLB Network as lead-in and lead-out music during the 2010 MLB postseason.

== Release ==
The single was originally planned to be added to the band's Myspace page at 12:00 AM on Wednesday, August 12, 2009, before its first radio play on St. Louis radio station, 105.7 The Point, along with an interview with Aaron Fink on the Woodie and Rizzuto show later that morning. However, on Tuesday afternoon, August 11, The Point was scooped by radio station 97.9X (WBSX) of Wilkes-Barre, Pennsylvania (Breaking Benjamin's home town) who played the single before Hollywood Records' intended release date. This caused an earlier premiere to Breaking Benjamin's Myspace page. The song was added at 8:00 PM Eastern Time, August 11, 2009.

The song became available at iTunes on August 31, 2009, and is a downloadable track for the Rock Band video game series.

== Versions ==
The original version of I Will Not Bow is 3:37 long. There is also a radio edit, which can be heard over public radio; the edit does not contain the scream "fall" or the lyric "open your eyes". The third version of "I Will Not Bow" is only 3:13 long and can be heard on the end credits of the movie Surrogates. The fourth version is an acoustic version, accompanied by strings. This version was released on the extended version of the band's greatest hits album on August 16, 2011.

== Track listing ==
Promotional single
No.	Title	Length
1.	"I Will Not Bow (album version)"	3:38
2.	"I Will Not Bow"	3:39
3.	"I Will Not Bow"	3:39
4.	"Call-Out Hook"	0:08

Tracks two and three do not contain the scream "fall" or the lyric "open your eyes"

== Music video ==
The music video for "I Will Not Bow" was released to the band's Myspace on August 21, 2009. It featured clips from the movie Surrogates. The video was shot at the 7 World Trade Center, but has no connection or significant meaning having to do with the 9/11 events as stated by Aaron Fink in his Point interview on August 13, 2009. The video was directed by Rich Lee who has also directed for Evanescence. Lee chose the location, feeling it was an eerie place to film.

The video features several shots of singer Ben Burnley walking down a hallway singing into a microphone, as well as shots of the band performing together, and scenes from the movie. There is also a girl who goes onto an elevator, and comes up to the same floor the band is on. She sits down on a couch in front of a set of TVs, all of them either showing scenes from the movie, or the band playing. Towards the end of the video, the members of the band collapse, dropping their instruments, as does the girl. The video then goes to Burnley strapped into one of the chairs from the movie, during which he sits up and takes his mask off, revealing that the band members themselves were using surrogates.

The Surrogates version is included on the DVD and Blu-ray release of the film.

A second version of the music video without the Surrogates footage was released with the Best Buy exclusive version of Dear Agony and on iTunes. It was later uploaded to YouTube in 2010.

== Chart performance ==
"I Will Not Bow" debuted at number 40 on the Billboard Hot 100, making it the band's highest charting song and first and only top 40 hit on the chart. It has reached number one on the Billboard Hot Rock Songs and Hot Mainstream Rock Tracks charts and number five on the Alternative Songs chart. AOL rated this song as the number one rock song of 2009, beating out such songs as "New Divide" by Linkin Park, "Break" by Three Days Grace and "Again" by Flyleaf.

=== Weekly charts ===
Chart (2009)	Peak position
Canada Hot 100 (Billboard)	98
Canada Rock (Billboard)	37
US Billboard Hot 100	40
US Hot Rock & Alternative Songs (Billboard)	1

=== Year-end charts ===
Chart (2009)	Position
US Hot Rock Songs (Billboard)	29
Chart (2010)	Position
US Hot Rock Songs (Billboard)	3

== Certifications ==
Region	Certification	Certified units/sales
New Zealand (RMNZ)	Gold	15,000^{‡}
United States (RIAA)	3× Platinum	3,000,000^{‡}
^{‡} Sales+streaming figures based on certification alone.

== Personnel ==
- Produced and mixed by David Bendeth
- Arranged by Breaking Benjamin and David Bendeth
- Mix engineer, engineering and digital editing by Dan Korneff, John Bender and Kato Khandwala
- Recorded and mixed at House of Loud, Elmwood Park, New Jersey
- Mastered by Ted Jensen at Sterling Sound, New York City
