= The Diary of Jane =

Single by Breaking Benjamin

from the album Phobia
- Released: June 6, 2006
- Recorded: 2006
- Genre: Post-grunge; hard rock
- Length: 3:20
- Label: Hollywood
- Songwriters: Benjamin Burnley; Aaron Fink; Mark Klepaski
- Producer: David Bendeth

Breaking Benjamin singles chronology
"Rain" (2005)	"The Diary of Jane" (2006)	"Breath" (2007)

Alternative cover
- iTunes cover

Music video
- "The Diary of Jane" on YouTube

"The Diary of Jane" is a song by American rock band Breaking Benjamin. It was released on June 6, 2006, as the lead single from their third album, Phobia. It received extensive radio airplay throughout the United States and reached number one under three rock charts. The single was certified 4× Platinum in the United States on February 3, 2021, Gold in the United Kingdom on January 31, 2025, Gold in Germany on April 3, 2023, and 2× Platinum in New Zealand on November 21, 2024, making it their most successful single in terms of sales internationally.

== Background ==
Speaking about the origins of the song in a 2019 interview, lead singer Benjamin Burnley said:

It all started because I was watching a lot of Forensic Files stuff where there were a bunch of unsolved mysteries. There was a Jane Doe that washed up on shore and she just got buried with no story. It was like a meaningless person. Nobody knew who she was to the point where whatever she did was all gone. So, Jane references Jane Doe but then making a story up for her because she had nothing. That's what started it and then once I started writing, it turned into more than that. ... This person Jane was just gone because they were unidentified for so long and lived this entire life for nothing.

== Composition ==
Jon Hadusek of Consequence described the song's genre as "almost post-post-grunge". He said: "It definitely has the masculine angst common to the genre proper, but there are also some mathy quirks and Tool-esque flare-ups in the song".

== Commercial performance ==
The single moved rapidly up the charts in its first week of official release. It debuted on the Billboard Hot 100 at number 55 before reaching number 50 and spending 15 weeks on chart. It was the number one most-added track at three formats: Rock, Modern Rock and Active Rock. This success propelled the song to number two on the Mainstream Rock Tracks chart and number four on the Modern Rock Tracks chart. "The Diary of Jane", as of June 2006, could be heard on over 100 radio stations in America. "The Diary of Jane" was the fastest added single in Hollywood Records history, topping such artists as Queen. The success of the song led it to be featured in the video game NASCAR 07 and as downloadable content for Rock Band and Rock Band 2. The song was also featured in the 2008 dance film Step Up 2: The Streets and the Portuguese telenovela Vingança. The song was also featured in the video game Fortnite Festival.

== Alternative versions ==
In total, the song has three different versions: the original version, the album version and the acoustic version, with the original being the only one that is not featured on Phobia. The original version was released with the single and was the track used for the video and radio airplay. It maintains almost no difference from the album version, with an exception of the ending fading out on a lower note along with other minor differences.

The album version is included on Phobia as the second track, it features the usual Breaking Benjamin sound of heavy percussion, down-tuned guitars, and the powering vocals of Benjamin Burnley, as well as the use of death growl vocals during two vocal passages. It is essentially a re-recording of the original.

The acoustic version is featured as a bonus track on the first pressing of Phobia. It features softer vocals by Burnley and harmonized softly by Sebastian Davin (of Dropping Daylight) as well as a shift of instruments: from drums, bass and guitar to piano (played by Burnley). Orchestral string instruments such as a violin and cello are also used.

== Music video ==
The video for "The Diary of Jane", directed by Ryan Smith, made its world premiere on Yahoo! Music on June 21, 2006, after originally being scheduled for release on June 16. The video features a woman named Jane Bryan, played by Sarah Mather from season four of American Idol. Jane wakes up suddenly in a bathtub, getting out and getting dressed. However, her vanity mirror is gone, and only the frame remains. Jane runs around her house, with similar results wherever there should be a mirror. It also shows scenes of the band playing in a room filled with mirrors. She eventually stumbles across the same room where all the mirrors are, and she cannot see her reflection in any of them. The video ends as Benjamin Burnley (the band's frontman) places a rose in a book atop her tombstone, explaining the story of the video: she fell asleep and drowned in the bathtub.

At the end of the video where Burnley closes the diary on Jane's tombstone, the last name was obscured. However, in the second episode of the band's podcast, the name can be clearly seen as "Bryan" during a shot of the tombstone. A Breaking Benjamin Celtic knot can also be seen on the tombstone in a brief shot before he closes the diary.

Jane Bryan was a female film star in the 1930s and 1940s. She was in many films, including We Are Not Alone, which is also the title for Breaking Benjamin's second album.

== Personnel ==
Breaking Benjamin

- Benjamin Burnley – lead vocals, rhythm guitar
- Aaron Fink – lead guitar
- Mark Klepaski – bass
- Chad Szeliga – drums

Production

- David Bendeth – production
- Chris Lord-Alge – mixing
- Ted Jensen – mastering
- Ryan Smith – music video director

== Charts ==
=== Weekly charts ===
Weekly chart performance for "The Diary of Jane"
Chart (2006)	Peak position
Canada Rock Top 30 (Radio & Records)	15
US Billboard Hot 100	50
US Pop 100 (Billboard)	46
US Alternative Airplay (Billboard)	4
US Mainstream Rock Airplay (Billboard)	2

=== Year-end charts ===
2006 year-end chart performance for "The Diary of Jane"
Chart (2006)	Position
US Alternative Songs (Billboard)	11
US Mainstream Rock Songs (Billboard)	9

2007 year-end chart performance for "The Diary of Jane"
Chart (2007)	Position
US Alternative Songs (Billboard)	35

== Certifications ==
Certifications for "The Diary of Jane"
Region	Certification	Certified units/sales
Denmark (IFPI Danmark)	Gold	45,000^{‡}
Germany (BVMI)	Gold	150,000^{‡}
New Zealand (RMNZ)	2× Platinum	60,000^{‡}
United Kingdom (BPI)	Gold	400,000^{‡}
United States (RIAA)	4× Platinum	4,000,000^{‡}
^{‡} Sales+streaming figures based on certification alone.
