= Run Like Hell (video game) =

2002 video game

- Developer: Digital Mayhem
- Publisher: Interplay Entertainment
- Designer: Brian Freyermuth
- Composer: Inon Zur
- Engine: RenderWare
- Platforms: PlayStation 2, Xbox
- Release: PlayStation 2: NA: September 30, 2002; EU: October 3, 2003; Xbox: NA: April 8, 2003; EU: June 18, 2004; AU: August 6, 2004
- Genre: Third-person shooter
- Mode: Single-player

Run Like Hell is a third-person shooter video game developed by Digital Mayhem, published by Interplay Entertainment and distributed in Europe by Avalon Interactive for the PlayStation 2 in late 2002 and for Xbox in early 2003. In Japan, the PS2 version was released by Capcom in 2004.

Run Like Hell is set on a space station in the distant future. It features the voice talents of Lance Henriksen, Kevin Michael Richardson, Thomas F. Wilson, Clancy Brown, Kate Mulgrew, Michael Ironside, Cree Summer and Brad Dourif.

The game's official soundtrack features two songs by Breaking Benjamin: "Home" and "Polyamorous", the latter including an exclusive music video.

The later Xbox version includes one new level and several new alien creatures, while several optional player character skins and additional minigames could also be downloaded via Xbox Live or the Xbox Exhibition 3 demo disc.

== Gameplay ==
The gameplay in Run Like Hell is most similar to that of the later titles in the Resident Evil series, with the player controlling a character from a third-person perspective. Enemies can be locked onto when firing and while reloading weapons is still required, most of the weapons have infinite ammo. The game also features a number of chase sequences, in which the player must flee from an invincible foe while dodging the obstacles in their path both with the analog stick and the face buttons. In these sections the player must use the analog stick to move around obstructions like crates and boxes and through narrow pathways. If a gap or low clearance is ahead, the game will prompt the player to push a specific face button to jump or duck. If the player takes too long to navigate the sequence, the enemy will catch the player and they will have to replay the sequence.

== Plot ==
Mining surveyor and former war hero Nicholas Conner (voiced by Lance Henriksen), returns to his space station known as the Forsetti Station to find it overrun by a hostile, previously unknown alien species known simply as The Race. Most of the crew members are dead, Nick's fiancée Samantha is missing, and he soon discovers that the entire station is slowly degenerating into an alien hive. Using his war experience and a large arsenal of weapons, Nick must fight through a group of hostile enemies to locate survivors on the station who can help him find Samantha.

== Development ==
According to Brian Freyermuth, the lead designer of Run Like Hell, the production did not go smoothly. During its five-year run, the team went through two executive producers, three producers, three lead programmers and two lead artists. They started out with the idea of Resident Evil in space, but this was changed abruptly by upper management from survival horror to an action game. As a result, the alien enemies were weakened and made more numerous. In the end, the game was scrapped by management again and development restarted less than a year before the release date. The game's actual programming was done in the space of only ten months, even though the game was in production for five years; this is why the story and characters seem well established, whereas the gameplay feels rushed and incomplete. The game was also meant to be part of a trilogy, as is obvious by the cliffhanger ending.

== Reception ==
Reception

Aggregate score
Aggregator	Score	
Aggregator	PS2	Xbox
Metacritic	58/100	55/100

Review scores
Publication	Score	
Publication	PS2	Xbox
Electronic Gaming Monthly	N/A	6.5/10
Famitsu	28/40	N/A
Game Informer	8/10	8/10
GamePro	2/5	2.5/5
GameSpot	4/10	4.1/10
GameSpy	N/A	2/5
GameZone	5/10	6/10
IGN	6.6/10	4.1/10
Official U.S. PlayStation Magazine	3/5	N/A
Official Xbox Magazine (US)	N/A	6.5/10
The Cincinnati Enquirer	3.5/5	N/A
Entertainment Weekly	C	N/A

Run Like Hell received "mixed" reviews on both platforms according to video game review aggregator Metacritic.

The Village Voice gave the Xbox version a score of seven out of ten and said: "It's one thing to watch your favorite stars provide product placement in Hollywood blockbusters, quite another to force the BAWLS into your mouth as a condition of advancing through the game". The Cincinnati Enquirer gave the PS2 version three-and-a-half stars out of five and said that it "delivers a good twist on the Resident Evil-style game play by adding more action and speed, a decent script and memorable characters. Entertainment Weekly, however, gave the same version a C and said: "If only the designers had spent as much time on the gameplay as they did on rendering the abundant female anatomy". In Japan, where the PS2 version was released on September 2, 2004, Famitsu gave it a score of all four sevens, for a total of 28 out of 40.

In 2009, GamesRadar included it among the games "with untapped franchise potential", commenting: "After five years of development, redevelopment and bureaucratic nonsense, what was supposed to be a survival-horror game was beaten into a shoddy action game with a cliffhanger ending but no chance of sequels. It's too bad - with the right people, this unfulfilled series could be revived and done right".
