= Until the End (Breaking Benjamin song) =

Single by Breaking Benjamin

from the album Phobia
- Released: October 2, 2007
- Recorded: 2006
- Length: 4:14
- Label: Hollywood
- Songwriters: Benjamin Burnley; Aaron Fink; Mark Klepaski
- Producer: David Bendeth

Breaking Benjamin singles chronology
"Breath" (2007)	"Until the End" (2007)	"I Will Not Bow" (2009)

"Until the End" is a song by American rock band Breaking Benjamin. It was released on October 2, 2007 as the third single from their third album, Phobia. On February 11, 2014, "Until the End" was certified gold by the RIAA, which made the single the first certified song by the band. Since then, the band have been awarded with six gold, three platinum, and three multi-platinum singles.

== Release ==
The song was posted on Breaking Benjamin's Myspace page and said to be a future single on July 10, 2007; its release was announced that same night on The Shallow Bay Radio, Breaking Benjamin's online radio station. The original date was for July 10, 2007, but was moved to October 2.

== Track listing ==
All tracks are written by Benjamin Burnley, Aaron Fink and Mark Klepaski.

Promotional single
No.	Title	Length
1.	"Until the End"	4:12

== Charts ==
=== Weekly charts ===
Weekly chart performance for "Until the End"
Chart (2008)	Peak position
US Bubbling Under Hot 100 (Billboard)	22
US Alternative Airplay (Billboard)	21
US Mainstream Rock (Billboard)	6

=== Year-end charts ===
Year-end chart performance for "Until the End"
Chart (2008)	Position
US Mainstream Rock Songs (Billboard)	29

== Certifications ==
Certifications for "Until the End"
Region	Certification	Certified units/sales
United States (RIAA)	Gold	500,000^{‡}
^{‡} Sales+streaming figures based on certification alone.

== In other media ==
- "Until the End" was used during the television broadcast of WWE WrestleMania: The World Television Premiere on MyNetworkTV on October 2, 2008, showcasing the match between Randy Orton, John Cena, and Triple H.
- The song is featured as a downloadable content part of the Breaking Benjamin track pack in that is released in Guitar Hero 5.
