= Benjamin Burnley =

American rock musician (born 1978)

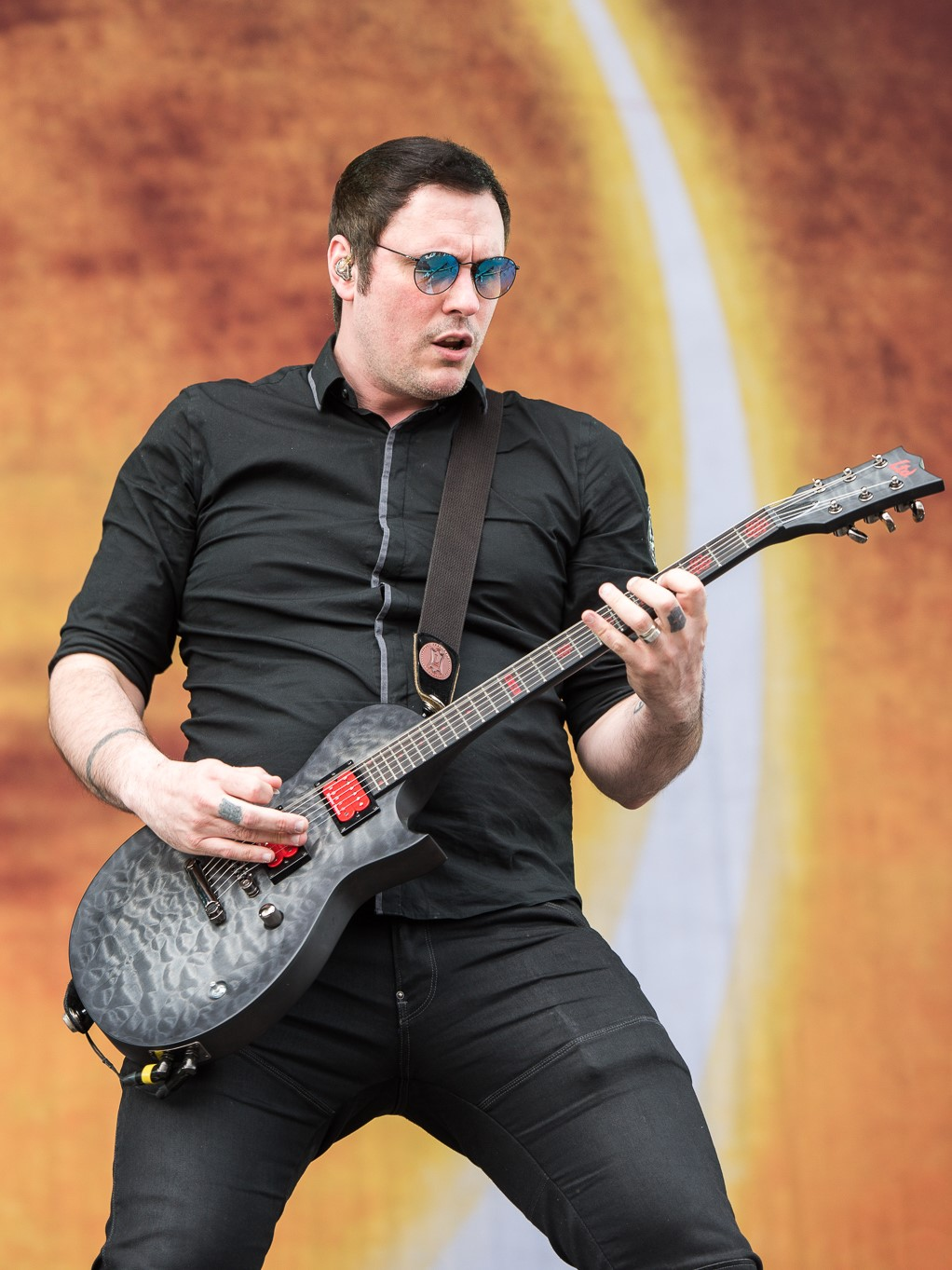
- Burnley performing in 2016

Background information
- Born: Benjamin Jackson Burnley IV; March 10, 1978 (age 48); Atlantic City, New Jersey, U.S.
- Genres: Alternative rock; hard rock; alternative metal; post-grunge
- Occupations: Singer; musician; songwriter; record producer
- Instruments: Vocals; guitar
- Years active: 1998–present
- Member of: Breaking Benjamin

Benjamin Jackson Burnley IV (born March 10, 1978) is an American musician and the founder and frontman of the rock band Breaking Benjamin. As the sole constant and namesake of the group, Burnley has served as its principal songwriter, lead vocalist, and rhythm guitarist since its inception in 1999.

Since signing with Hollywood Records in 2002, Burnley has composed six studio albums under the name Breaking Benjamin, three of which have reached platinum and two of which have reached gold in the United States. Burnley has also collaborated with acts such as Adam Gontier, Lacey Sturm and Red.

== Early life and education ==
Burnley was born in Atlantic City, New Jersey, and grew up in Ocean City, New Jersey, before moving with his family at the age of 12 to Selinsgrove, Pennsylvania. At 16, after being home schooled, he passed the GED requirement.

== Career ==
=== Breaking Benjamin ===
In 1998, Burnley and former lead guitarist Aaron Fink got together with Nick Hoover and Chris Lightcap and started the band Breaking Benjamin. Eventually, Burnley wanted to try something different and went out to California to try some new material. The other three members went on to form the band Strangers with Candy, later known as Lifer. They recruited old friend Mark Klepaski to play bass and he joined in, and shortly after, Hoover was asked to leave the band.

In 1999, Burnley moved back to Pennsylvania, and started a band called "Plan 9" with drummer Jeremy Hummel. The band initially was a three-piece. The lineups consisted of Burnley on vocals and electric guitar, Jeremy on drums, and Jason Davoli on bass. Plan 9 would occasionally open for Lifer at home shows. During one show, Burnley said "Thank you, we're Breaking Benjamin," reclaiming the name from 1998. Later on, Klepaski left Lifer, and began playing bass for Breaking Benjamin. Lifer continued going through struggles, and months later, Aaron Fink sat in for a set with Benjamin. Finally, Fink left Lifer, and was offered a spot in Ben Burnley's band, and they became a four-piece.

=== Collaborations ===
Burnley has collaborated and performed with fellow alternative metal bands, including Three Days Grace, Evans Blue, and Disturbed. He made a guest spot on a special remix of The Drama Club's (Band of Lifer's singer, Nick Coyle) single "Brand New Day." He also co-wrote the Red hit song "Shadows" and Madam Adam song "Forgotten". Burnley has collaborated with Three Days Grace singer Adam Gontier on a song titled "The End of the Day" (yet to be released).

== Lyrics and vocal style ==
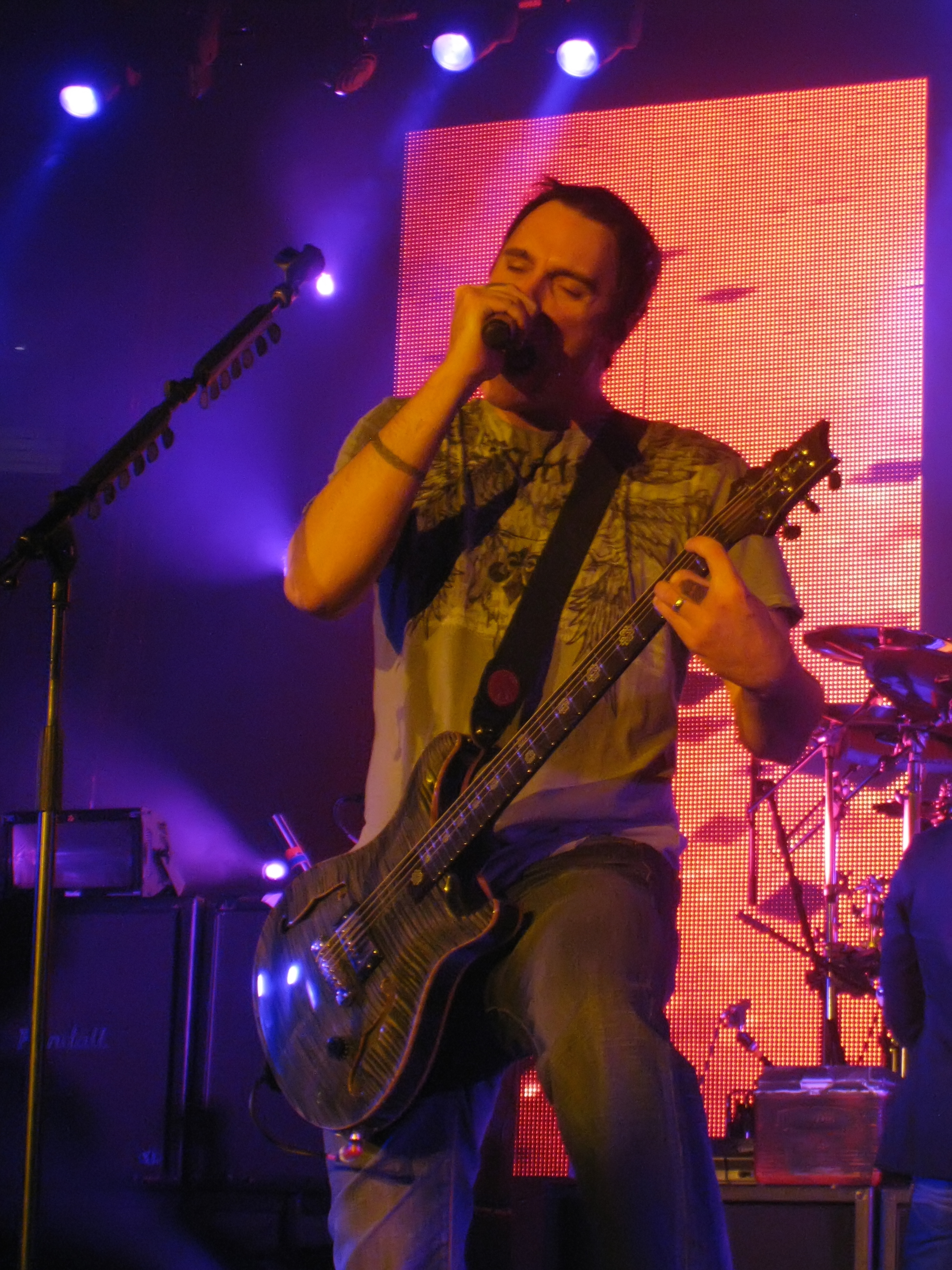
Burnley with Breaking Benjamin in 2010

Burnley's lyrical content frequently and most recently consists of cryptic, angst-ridden themes that "waffle between being plaintive and aggressive." Burnley has the range of a dramatic tenor and occasionally utilizes death growls and screams in his singing. IGN described him as having a "somewhat innocuous voice that is crystal clear... fluctuating between contemplative subjectivity and growling anger." Burnley uses baritone guitars and drop tunings for a heavier sound, a natural songwriting workflow, and specific chord intervals that standard guitars couldn't handle.

== Personal life ==
Burnley has several phobias, a fact that inspired the title of Breaking Benjamin’s 2006 album Phobia. Phobia's cover, which depicts a winged man hovering above the ground, represents Burnley's fear of flying, which has prevented Breaking Benjamin from touring outside the United States and Canada in the past. However in May 2016, he and his band members traveled by ferry ship to Europe and made their first musical tour outside of North America. Breaking Benjamin again toured Europe in 2017 successfully. Burnley also has hypochondria and a fear of the dark.

Burnley is an avid video gamer, and conceived of the idea for Breaking Benjamin to write and record the song "Blow Me Away" for the soundtrack to Halo 2. The song "Polyamorous" is also featured on the games Run Like Hell, WWE SmackDown! vs. Raw and WWE Day of Reckoning (along with their song "Firefly"). "The Diary of Jane" appears on NASCAR 07 and Fortnite Festival. Burnley publishes mods for Fallout 4 and The Elder Scrolls V: Skyrim under the username "killemloud."

Burnley is a recovering alcoholic, admitting in an interview that he wanted to "drink himself to death." He says that he regrets ever drinking a drop of alcohol and has Wernicke–Korsakoff syndrome due to his past excessive drinking. Dear Agony was reported to be the first ever Breaking Benjamin record to be written by Burnley without the use of alcohol.
