= WGMF =

WGMF may refer to:

- WGMF (AM), a radio station (750 AM) licensed to serve Olyphant, Pennsylvania, United States
- WGMF-FM, a radio station (103.9 FM) licensed to serve Dushore, Pennsylvania
- WAZL (AM), a radio station (730 AM) licensed to serve Nanticoke, Pennsylvania, which held the call sign WGMF from 2018 to 2023
- WGMM, a radio station (1460 AM) licensed to serve Tunkhannock, Pennsylvania, which held the call sign WGMF from 2009 to 2018
- WLGD (FM), a radio station (107.7 FM) licensed to serve Dallas, Pennsylvania, which held the call signs WGMF or WGMF-FM from 2006 to 2009
- WNGZ (AM), a radio station (1490 AM) licensed to serve Watkins Glen, New York, United States, which held the call sign WGMF from 1968 to 1999 and from 1999 to 2004
