= WCDL =

Simulcasting WICK Scranton
- Carbondale, Pennsylvania; United States
- Broadcast area: Scranton/Wilkes-Barre
- Frequency: 1440 kHz
- Branding: The Mothership

Programming
- Format: Oldies
- Affiliations: Scranton/Wilkes-Barre RailRiders

Ownership
- Owner: Bold Gold Media Group
- Sister stations: WTRW, WICK, WYCK, WWRR, WPSN, WDNH-FM, WYCY, WDNB

History
- First air date: January 1950
- Call sign meaning: CarbonDaLe

Technical information
- Licensing authority: FCC
- Facility ID: 58316
- Class: D
- Power: 5,000 watts day 37 watts night
- Transmitter coordinates: 41°33′23″N 75°29′7″W
- Translators: 106.7 W294BJ (Honesdale); 107.9 W300DQ (Carbondale)

Links
- Public license information: Public file; LMS
- Webcast: Listen Live
- Website: WCDL Online

WCDL (1440 AM) is a radio station licensed to Carbondale, Pennsylvania. The station operates with 5,000 watts daytime and 37 Watts nighttime with a non-directional antenna. The Federal Communications Commission considers WCDL a Class D AM broadcast station. Bold Gold Media Group is the current owner of WCDL.

== History ==
The station flipped formats from adult standards to a mix of Tropical and Spanish language adult contemporary format in August 2007 branded as "Caliente" (translation from Spanish into English as "Hot") to serve the region's growing Hispanic population. Former sister station WNAK, 730 kHz, located in Nanticoke, started simulcasting WCDL programming in October 2007.

In late 2008 WCDL returned to the adult standards format, simulcasting with WNAK 730 kHz under the slogan "The Greatest Music of All Time".

As of 2011, WCDL was simulcasting with WICK and WYCK with sports as "The Game".

On March 8, 2020 WCDL changed their format from sports to oldies, branded as "The Mothership", simulcasting WICK 1400 AM Scranton.
