= WWRR =

- Scranton, Pennsylvania; United States
- Broadcast area: Scranton, Pennsylvania
- Frequency: 104.9 MHz (HD Radio)
- Branding: The River, 105 and 103.5

Programming
- Format: Classic hits
- Subchannels: HD2: WAZL simulcast HD3: Urban contemporary "Loud 103.7"; HD4: WICK simulcast

Ownership
- Owner: Bold Gold Media
- Sister stations: WTRW, WICK, WYCK, WCDL, WPSN, WDNH-FM, WYCY, WDNB

History
- First air date: December 19, 1964
- Former call signs: WWDL (1964–2005)
- Call sign meaning: River

Technical information
- Licensing authority: FCC
- Facility ID: 36508
- Class: A
- ERP: 270 watts
- HAAT: 333 meters
- Translator: HD3: 103.7 W279EM (Scranton)

Links
- Public license information: Public file; LMS
- Webcast: Listen Live; Listen Live (HD3)
- Website: therivernepa.com loudradiopa.com/nepa/ (HD3)

WWRR (104.9 FM) is a classic hits radio station in Scranton, Pennsylvania, United States, known as The River, 105 and 103-5.

WWRR programming is simulcast on co-owned WYCK (1340 AM), licensed to nearby Plains, as well as WYCK’s F.M. translators W264CG/100.7 Wilkes-Barre and W285FT/104.9 Hazleton.

The station's logo was featured in a fourth season episode of the NBC sitcom The Office, along with sister station WICK.

On April 1, 2018, WWRR began simulcasting on WMMZ 103.5 FM Berwick.

== HD Radio ==
On October 16, 2024, WWRR began stunting on its HD3 subchannel with non-stop Drake, branded as "Drake 103.7" (simulcast on F.M. translator W280CV 103.7 Scranton).

At 4 p.m. on November 8, 2024, WWRR HD3 ended stunting and launched an urban contemporary format, branded as "Loud 103.7".
