= WMMZ =

Simulcasting WWRR Scranton
- Berwick, Pennsylvania; United States
- Frequency: 103.5 MHz
- Branding: The River, 105 & 103.5

Programming
- Format: Classic hits

Ownership
- Owner: Bold Gold Media; (Bold Gold Media WBS, L.P.)
- Sister stations: WWRR, WTRW, WICK, WYCK, WCDL

History
- First air date: 1992 (as WKAB)
- Former call signs: WZWB (1990–1991, CP); WKAB (1991–2006); WHLM-FM (2006–2017)

Technical information
- Licensing authority: FCC
- Facility ID: 141
- Class: A
- ERP: 4,100 watts
- HAAT: 118 meters (387 ft)
- Transmitter coordinates: 41°5′11.00″N 76°16′41.00″W

Links
- Public license information: Public file; LMS
- Webcast: Listen Live
- Website: therivernepa.com

WMMZ (103.5 FM, "The River, 105 & 103-5") is a radio station broadcasting a classic hits music format. Licensed to Berwick, Pennsylvania, United States, the station is currently owned by Bold Gold Media. The WMMZ broadcast studio is co-located with WWRR inside the Mohegan Sun Pocono casino in Plains Township, Pennsylvania, United States.

On April 1, 2018, WMMZ changed formats from classic rock to a simulcast of classic hits-formatted WWRR 104.9 FM Scranton.

== Previous logo ==
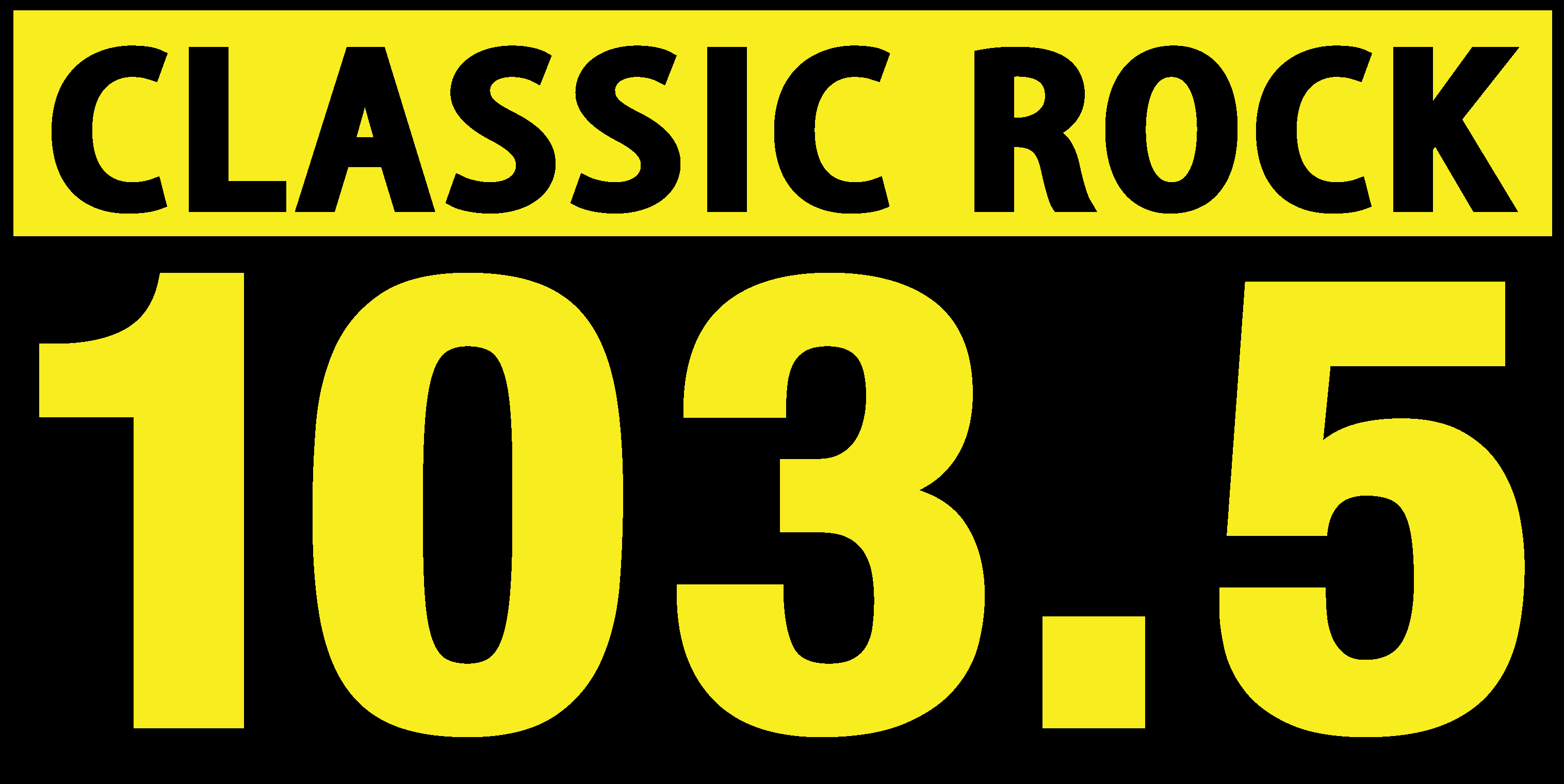
