= WICK =

Coordinates: 41.418056°N 75.661944°W

- Scranton, Pennsylvania; United States
- Broadcast area: Scranton/Wilkes-Barre
- Frequency: 1400 kHz
- Branding: The Mothership

Programming
- Format: Oldies
- Affiliations: Scranton/Wilkes-Barre RailRiders

Ownership
- Owner: Bold Gold Media Group, LP
- Sister stations: WWRR, WYCK, WCDL, WPSN, WDNB, WTRW, WDNH-FM, WYCY

History
- First air date: April 17, 1954

Technical information
- Licensing authority: FCC
- Facility ID: 36489
- Class: C
- Power: 1,000 watts unlimited
- Translator: 104.1 W281CQ (Scranton)
- Repeaters: 1440 AM/106.7 FM (WCDL/W294BJ, Carbondale/Honesdale)

Links
- Public license information: Public file; LMS
- Webcast: Listen Live
- Website: The Mothership

WICK (1400 AM) is an oldies radio station in Scranton, Pennsylvania branded as "The Mothership" and is owned by Bold Gold Media, through licensee Bold Gold Media Group, LP. Programming is simulcast on co-owned WCDL/1440AM & W294BJ/106.7FM, licensed to nearby Carbondale, Pennsylvania, and translator W281CQ at 104.1 FM in Scranton.

The station is owned by Bold Gold Media. In 2006, the station owners dropped the previous oldies format in favor of a sports radio format branded as "THE GAME" with programming coming from Fox Sports Radio and CBS Sports Network's Jim Rome. WICK simulcasted "THE GAME" radio format on its sister station WCDL located in Carbondale, Pennsylvania . The simulcast network is also the flagship network for Scranton/Wilkes-Barre RailRiders AAA Minor League Baseball radio play-by-play coverage.

WICK broadcast local play-by-play for high school and college football and basketball for over four decades. In the past, the station has also broadcast locally-based sports talk shows. Starting in 2009, "The District 2 Review & More" aired Thursdays from 5 to 6pm during the high school football and basketball seasons. The show was hosted by Paul Grippi and Jim Riley.

In 2013, "The Friday Night Sportsline with Chris Kucharski" was added to the lineup, airing 5 to 7pm on Fridays.

In 2014, a daily weekday drive time show was launched called "The CK Sports Blitz". The show aired Monday through Thursday from 4pm to 6pm and 4pm to 5pm on Fridays. The show was hosted by local sports personality Chris Kucharski. Upon the launch of the daily show, Kucharski left as host of "The Friday Night Sportsline" and was replaced by Eddie Walker.

On March 8, 2020, WICK changed format from sports to oldies, branded as "The Mothership".

On July 27, 2024, WICK filed an application to have translator 104.1 FM W282BK located in Scranton, Pennsylvania.
