= WQFM =

WQFM may refer to:

- WQFM (FM), a radio station (92.1 FM) licensed to serve Nanticoke, Pennsylvania, United States
- WFUZ (AM), a radio station (1240 AM) licensed to serve Wilkes-Barre, Pennsylvania, which held the call sign WQFM from 2018 to 2020
- WHNB, a radio station (104.5 FM) licensed to serve Hancock, New York, United States, which held the call sign WQFM from 2013 to 2018
- WQFN, a radio station (100.1 FM) licensed to serve Forest City, Pennsylvania, which held the call sign WQFM from 2010 to 2013
- WLVE, a radio station (93.3 FM) licensed to serve Milwaukee, Wisconsin, United States, which held the call sign WQFM from 1958 to 1996
