= Cleveland Scene =

Entertainment newspaper in Cleveland, Ohio

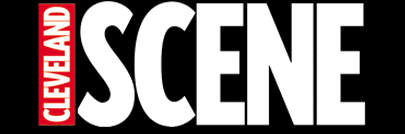
- Type: Alternative weekly
- Owner: Great Lakes Publishing
- Publisher: Euclid Media Group
- Founded: 1970
- Headquarters: Cleveland, Ohio
- ISSN: 1064-6116
- OCLC number: 240898199
- Website: clevescene.com

The Cleveland Scene is an alternative weekly newspaper based in Cleveland, Ohio. The newspaper includes highlights of Cleveland-area arts, music, dining, and films, as well as classified advertising. The first edition of the newspaper was published in the 1970s.

Cleveland Scene provides a yearly "Best Of" list for the Cleveland and outlying areas that includes Best Restaurants, Best Clubs, Best Theater, etc. Cleveland Scene employs regular columnists as well as freelance journalists.

In 2002, New Times Media, which published The Scene, agreed to shut down its Los Angeles alternative paper in exchange for an $8 million payment, while Village Voice Media agreed to shut down its competing Cleveland Free Times for a smaller payment, triggering a federal antitrust investigation by the U.S. Department of Justice.

== Ownership ==
Cleveland Scene was founded in 1970. In 1998, the Scene was acquired by New Times Media. In 2005, New Times acquired Village Voice Media, and changed its name to Village Voice Media.

The Free Times and Cleveland Scene were purchased by Times-Shamrock Communications, located in Scranton, Pennsylvania, in 2008. Times-Shamrock is a media company that publishes daily and weekly newspapers throughout Pennsylvania, Virginia, Maryland, Florida, Michigan, and Texas. They also own radio stations in Baltimore.

In December 2013, Times-Shamrock sold Scene to the Cleveland-based Euclid Media Group, along with the Detroit Metro Times, Orlando Weekly and the San Antonio Current. The company dissolved in August 2023 and four of the newspapers, including Scene, was sold to Chava Communications, an entity created by Michael Wagner and his wife, Cassandra Yardeni Wagner. In January 2024, the newspaper was sold to Cleveland Magazine parent company Great Lakes Publishing.

== See also ==
- Euclid Media Group
