= WARM (AM) =

Radio station in Scranton, Pennsylvania

Simulcasting WGMM Tunkhannock
- Scranton, Pennsylvania; United States
- Broadcast area: Scranton–Wilkes-Barre–Hazleton
- Frequency: 590 kHz
- Branding: Gem 99 and 100

Programming
- Format: Classic hits
- Affiliations: Compass Media Networks

Ownership
- Owner: Seven Mountains Media; (Southern Belle, LLC)

History
- First air date: 1940

Technical information
- Licensing authority: FCC
- Facility ID: 70504
- Class: B
- Power: 1,800 watts day; 430 watts night
- Transmitter coordinates: 41.478554°N 75.876442°W
- Translator: 101.7 W269CF (Scranton)

Links
- Public license information: Public file; LMS
- Webcast: Listen live
- Website: gem99and100.com

WARM (590 kHz) is an AM radio station licensed to Scranton, Pennsylvania, United States, and serving the Scranton–Wilkes-Barre–Hazleton radio market. The station is owned by Seven Mountains Media, through licensee Southern Belle, LLC. The station, which has gone silent for extended periods, most recently resumed broadcasting on May 23, 2025. It simulcasts Gem 99 and 100 classic hits programming that is also on WGMF 750 AM.

WARM is a Class B station. It is powered at 1,800 watts during the daytime and 430 watts at night. It has two different directional antenna signal patterns, primarily aimed towards the southeast with some signal aimed towards the northwest. Its transmitter is on Hugo Lane, 15 miles (24 km) northwest of Scranton in West Falls, Pennsylvania. WARM uses a three-tower array. Each tower is 495 feet (151 meters) high. Programming is also heard on FM translator 101.7 W269CF in Scranton.

== History ==
=== Early years ===
WARM has a long and distinguished history in Northeastern Pennsylvania broadcasting. It has held its original call letters since it signed on the air in 1940. It began broadcasting on 1370 kHz, powered at 250 watts. A year later, with the enactment of the North American Regional Broadcasting Agreement (NARBA), it switched to 1400 kHz.

WARM was originally a network affiliate of the Mutual Broadcasting System. It was owned by the Union Broadcasting Company and had its studios in the Select Building in Scranton.

=== The Mighty 590 ===
In the 1960s and 1970s, WARM was the predominant Top 40 station in the area, playing the hits for a generation of young listeners. It was known as "The Mighty 590". The station became an affiliate of the ABC Contemporary Radio Network.

In the 1980s, the station transitioned to a more adult sound as younger listeners were tuning to FM stations for their music. It spent time as an oldies station and also tried country music. In the early 2000s, it was owned by Citadel Broadcasting.

After Citadel bought the ABC Radio Networks in 2007, WARM became an ABC Radio owned-and-operated station. Citadel merged with Cumulus Media on September 16, 2011. Part of the station's broadcast day came from Scott Shannon's "The True Oldies Channel".

=== Off the air ===
For a time in April 2009, WARM went dark due to transmitter problems. Some of its equipment dated back 70 years. The station announced that, due to the high cost of replacing its transmitter, it had no plans to return. The host of WARM's weekly polka music show told a reporter, "Unless there's a miracle, they ain't coming back." However, on April 23, with an effort by its engineers to get it working again, WARM returned to the air. It was still airing its oldies format and weekly polka program.

On September 15, 2014, WARM went silent again, due to a transmitter failure. On November 24, 2014, an application was filed with the Federal Communications Commission (FCC) to lower power from 5,000 watts during day and night to 1,800 watts daytime and 430 watts nights. It would use only three of its five towers. The station resumed broadcasting in December 2014. At this point, it switched to a sports radio format, as an affiliate of CBS Sports Radio. Cumulus Media had a financial interest in that network.

=== Bigfoot Legends ===
Cumulus sold WARM to Major Keystone on September 24, 2021. On January 19, 2022, after completing the purchase, Major Keystone resold WARM to Seven Mountains Media. Seven Mountains replaced the sports programming with a simulcast of co-owned classic country station WLGD (107.7 FM). The stations were branded as "Bigfoot Legends".

In 2024, ten of WARM's early radio personalities were inducted into the Luzerne County Arts & Entertainment Hall of Fame under the collective moniker "Legends of WARMland". That May, Seven Mountains Media sold WLGD to Times-Shamrock Communications, while retaining WARM. While WLGD began simulcasting Times-Shamrock-owned classic rock station WEZX, WARM was taken silent while seeking a new programming source.

== Translator ==
Broadcast translator for WARM
Call sign	Frequency	City of license	FID	ERP (W)	HAAT	Class	Transmitter coordinates	FCC info
W269CF	101.7 FM	Scranton, Pennsylvania	157680	57	224.5 m (737 ft)	D	41°25′36″N 75°44′51″W	LMS
