= WAZL =

WAZL may refer to:

- WAZL (AM), a radio station (730 AM) licensed to serve Nanticoke, Pennsylvania, United States
- WGMA (AM), a radio station (1490 AM) licensed to serve Hazleton, Pennsylvania, which held the call sign WAZL from 1932 to 2023
