= KSRN =

Radio station in Kings Beach, California

- Kings Beach, California; United States
- Broadcast area: Reno, Nevada
- Frequency: 107.7 MHz
- Branding: Radio Lazer 107.7 FM

Programming
- Format: Regional Mexican

Ownership
- Owner: Lazer Media; (Lazer Licenses, LLC)
- Sister stations: KNEZ; KWNZ; KZTI

History
- First air date: November 1994
- Former call signs: KBCH (1989–1996); KHWG (1996–2000)
- Call sign meaning: Originally "Know Stereo Radio Nevada" from its use at 104.5 MHz

Technical information
- Licensing authority: FCC
- Facility ID: 34582
- Class: C3
- ERP: 230 watts
- HAAT: 874 meters (2,867 ft)
- Transmitter coordinates: 39°18′48″N 119°52′59″W

Links
- Public license information: Public file; LMS
- Website: radiolazer.com/reno/

KSRN (107.7 FM) is a radio station licensed to Kings Beach, California, United States, serving the Reno, Nevada, market. The station is owned by Lazer Media and airs a regional Mexican music format branded as Radio Lazer.

After five years of planning, KSRN began broadcasting in November 1994 as KBCH "K-Beach". It was owned by Chris Kidd and used an adult contemporary format from the Satellite Music Network. In 1996, the station flipped to country as KHWG. Its primary competition was Reno's dominant country station, KBUL-FM 98.1. Its owner, Miller Media, expanded in the market by buying the 92.1 facility, then adult standards–formatted KSRN, from Comstock Communications.

Miller Media sold KSRN and KHWG to Boyd Broadcasting in 1998. Boyd switched KHWG from satellite-fed to local with live disc jockeys during the day in an attempt to increase ratings. In March 2000, KSRN's format and call letters moved to the former KHWG facility. This was part of the sale of both stations by Comstock Communications, which had reacquired them, to NextMedia Group of Denver. As the 92.1 and 107.7 facilities broadcast from different sites, this increased the coverage area of KSRN in many areas, but some loyal listeners were unable to tune into the 107.7 transmitter on Slide Mountain. That year, the station began broadcasting a weekly show of Tongan music and news, Sounds of the Friendly Islands, catering to the area's Tongan population.

NextMedia Group, unable to meaningfully raise KSRN's standards ratings, switched it in March 2002 from a local format to satellite-fed easy listening, removing big band music from its playlist and Oakland Athletics baseball from its lineup. One on-air personality, Bob Carroll, was hired by KUNR to host a weekly big band show after the station saw the letters to the editor that local seniors wrote to the Reno Gazette-Journal protesting the change.

In 2003, NextMedia bought KNHK (92.9 FM). This required it to divest one of its existing Reno radio stations, and the company selected KSRN for divestiture. Lazer Broadcasting Corporation acquired the station for $2.5 million. Until 2023, Lazer Media operated KSRN as a simulcast with KZTI (105.3 FM).
