= WZMF =

WZMF may refer to:

- WGMM, a radio station (1460 AM) licensed to serve Tunkhannock, Pennsylvania, United States, which held the call sign WZMF from 2018 to 2021
- WAZL (AM), a radio station (730 AM) licensed to serve Nanticoke, Pennsylvania, which held the call sign WZMF from 2010 to 2018
- WJMR-FM, a radio station (98.3 FM) licensed to serve Menomonee Falls, Wisconsin, United States, which held the call sign WZMF from 1966 to 1979
