= The Citizens' Voice =

Daily newspaper in Pennsylvania

- The July 27, 2005 front page of The Citizens' Voice
- Type: Daily newspaper
- Format: Broadsheet
- Owner: MediaNews Group
- Publisher: Donald Farley
- Editor: Larry Holeva
- Founded: 1978
- Language: English
- Headquarters: 75 N. Washington Street; Wilkes-Barre, PA 18711; United States
- ISSN: 1070-8626
- Website: citizensvoice.com

The Citizens' Voice is a compact newspaper published daily in Wilkes-Barre, Pennsylvania. Its 2005 circulation was 32,862, mostly Luzerne County residents.

== History ==
=== Founding ===
The newspaper was founded in 1978 by striking employees of the Wilkes-Barre Publishing Company, which published the Times Leader. Established on October 9 of that year, The Citizens' Voice was initially a "strike newspaper" published by the local Newspaper Guild, but quickly grew to become a direct competitor to the Times Leader.

After 11 years, the Newspaper Guild turned control of The Citizens' Voice over to the original striking employees. The Citizens' Voice, Inc., was formed to manage the newspaper. The Citizens' Voice added a Sunday edition in 1993.

=== 2000 sale ===
In 2000, the newspaper was sold to Scranton-based Times-Shamrock Communications. That year, the company formed the Northeast Pennsylvania News Alliance, a news-sharing agreement between Times-Shamrock's newspapers and several local radio and TV stations.

Several of the original strikers from 1978 still work for the newspaper. The Citizens' Voice is the oldest newspaper formed by striking workers in the nation.

=== 2023 sale ===
In August 2023, Times-Shamrock Communications sold the newspaper and three other daily newspapers to MediaNews Group, a subsidiary of Alden Global Capital.

== See also ==
- Times Leader
- Scranton Times-Tribune
- Republican Herald
