= WFUZ =

WFUZ may refer to:

- WFUZ (AM), a radio station (1240 AM) licensed to serve Wilkes-Barre, Pennsylvania, United States
- WQFM (FM), a radio station (92.1 FM) licensed to serve Nanticoke, Pennsylvania, which held the call sign WFUZ from 2010 to 2020
- WCDR, a radio station (90.9 FM) licensed to serve Laporte, Pennsylvania, which held the call sign WFUZ in 2010
- WCDJ, a radio station (91.3 FM) licensed to serve Tunkhannock, Pennsylvania, which held the call sign WFUZ from 2009 to 2010
- WOGK, a radio station (93.7 FM) licensed to serve Ocala, Florida, United States, which held the call sign WFUZ from 1973 to 1986
