= WQOR =

WQOR may refer to:

- WQOR (FM), a radio station (90.5 FM) licensed to serve Laceyville, Pennsylvania, United States; see List of radio stations in Pennsylvania
- WGMF (AM), a radio station (750 AM) licensed to serve Olyphant, Pennsylvania, which held the call sign WQOR from 2003 to 2023
