= WRPA (disambiguation) =

WRPA usually refers to Welsh Rugby Players Association, a Welsh rugby trade union.

WRPA may also refer to:

- WPVD (AM), a radio station (1290 AM) licensed to Providence, Rhode Island, which held the call sign WRPA from 2018 to 2020
- WGMF-FM, a radio station (103.9 FM) licensed to Dushore, Pennsylvania, which held the call sign WRPA from 1996 to 2001
