= WBSX =

Coordinates: 41.081944°N 75.948611°W

- Hazleton, Pennsylvania; United States
- Broadcast area: Wilkes-Barre–Scranton
- Frequency: 97.9 MHz
- Branding: 97.9 X

Programming
- Format: Active rock
- Affiliations: Compass Media Networks

Ownership
- Owner: Cumulus Media; (Radio License Holding CBC, LLC)
- Sister stations: WBHT, WMGS, WSJR/WBHD

History
- First air date: July 9, 1949
- Former call signs: WAZL-FM (1949–1970); WVCD (1970–1985); WWSH (1985–1994); WZMT (1994–1997); WXBE (1997–2001); WAOZ (2001)
- Call sign meaning: Wilkes-Barre and Scranton's X

Technical information
- Licensing authority: FCC
- Facility ID: 133
- Class: B
- ERP: 6,300 watts
- HAAT: 407 meters
- Repeater: WODE-HD3 (Easton)

Links
- Public license information: Public file; LMS
- Webcast: Listen Live
- Website: 979x.com

WBSX (97.9 FM) is a radio station licensed to the city of Hazleton, Pennsylvania, broadcasting to the Scranton/Wilkes Barre/Hazleton radio market. WBSX airs an active rock music format branded as "97-9 X" (pronounced as "Ninety-Seven Nine X").

== History ==
The radio station began test broadcasts on May 6, 1949, and started its official broadcasts on July 9, as WAZL-FM, the FM sister station to WAZL AM also located in the city of Hazleton. During the early 1970s, the station switched to what was branded as a "beautiful music" format (which was a form of Easy Listening or Elevator Music) and the call sign WVCD. The station was automated with no live DJs or announcers during this time. The station evolved their music format slightly by 1985 when the station changed call signs to WWSH and branded on air as "Wish 98". The station made a dramatic switch in 1994 to a rock music format and another call sign change to WZMT to reflect the new on air branding as "The Mountain". In 1996, it was renamed "98 Rock". In 1997, under Citadel Broadcasting, the name changed to "The Bear", with the call letters WXBE, and featuring the syndicated Howard Stern Show in mornings. In October 2001, the station shifted to a format branded as "classic hard rock", name change to "Z-Rock", and call letters to WAOZ. 7 months later, in May 2002, the station returned to a more current-based rock format under the call sign of WBSX, and branding as "97-9 X" with an alternative rock format (which was moved over from 93.7 FM). By 2007, the station adopted its current active rock format. Citadel merged with Cumulus Media on September 16, 2011.

== Trivia ==
97.9X is known for being the first commercial station to play Breaking Benjamin, who started in local Wilkes-Barre. The station's Breaking Benjamin promotion is also briefly featured in Breaking Benjamin's video for "Breath", which was recorded at Stabler Arena in Lehigh Valley, Pennsylvania in early 2007.
