= WMGS =

Wilkes-Barre, Pennsylvania; United States
- Broadcast area: Scranton–Wilkes-Barre; Northeastern Pennsylvania
- Frequency: 92.9 MHz
- Branding: Magic 93

Programming
- Format: Adult contemporary
- Affiliations: Westwood One

Ownership
- Owner: Cumulus Media; (Radio License Holding CBC, LLC)
- Sister stations: WBHT, WBSX, WSJR/WBHD

History
- First air date: 1946
- Former call signs: WYZZ (1946–1985)
- Call sign meaning: "Magic"

Technical information
- Licensing authority: FCC
- Facility ID: 70880
- Class: B
- ERP: 5,300 watts
- HAAT: 422 meters (1,385 ft)
- Transmitter coordinates: 41°10′56.3″N 75°52′20.7″W

Links
- Public license information: Public file; LMS
- Webcast: Listen live
- Website: www.magic93fm.com

WMGS (92.9 FM, "Magic 93") is a commercial radio station licensed to Wilkes-Barre, Pennsylvania, United States. It is owned by Cumulus Media, through licensee Radio License Holding CBC, LLC. It broadcasts an adult contemporary radio format, with studios and offices on Baltimore Drive in Wilkes-Barre.

WMGS's transmitter tower is sited on top of Penobscot Knob near Mountain Top.

== History ==
=== WYZZ ===
The station signed on the air in 1946 as the first FM station in Northeast Pennsylvania. (WKRZ, then WBRE-FM, got its start in 1947 and WGGY, then WGBI-FM, in 1948.) The original call sign on 92.9 was WIZZ, but those call letters switched to WYZZ a short time later. It was owned by Dick Evans, Sr., with the license held by the Scranton--Wilkes-Barre--Pittston Broadcasting Company. The studios were at 225 South Main Street in Wilkes-Barre.

By the 1960s, the station was known as "Whiz Radio". It had a broad based adult standards format, playing music from the 1930s, 1940s, early 1950s, along with middle of the road (MOR) titles and limited amounts of soft adult contemporary hits from the late 1950s, 1960s, and 1970s. Core artists included Frank Sinatra, Barbra Streisand, Neil Diamond, Peggy Lee, Nat "King" Cole, Ray Charles, Harry James, Ella Fitzgerald, softer Elvis Presley, Tony Bennett, Tommy Dorsey, Lettermen, Doris Day, Carpenters, Jack Jones, Kay Starr and Frankie Laine. The station aired this format from Monday through Saturday from 6 a.m. to 12 p.m., 3 p.m. to 8 p.m., and from midnight to 6 a.m. It switched to classical music Monday through Saturday 12 p.m. to 3 p.m. and 8 p.m. to midnight. On Sundays, there was specialty programming such as a Polka music show, Irish music program and a Big Band show.

WYZZ was the sixth FM station in the United States to broadcast in FM stereo. During the 1960s it was also one of the first stations to broadcast live stereo remotes, the Wyoming Valley Oratorio Society and the Northeast Pennsylvania Philharmonic. If the station did not broadcast the local classical organizations live, they recorded them and played them back at a future date. WYZZ was an experimental testing ground for several developments in the art of FM radio. WYZZ was put on the air with the assistance of Major Edwin Armstrong, a pioneer in developing FM radio. The station was part of his FM network. One of the first vertically polarized antennas was installed there along with a transit radio service and multiplex subcarriers. In later years, the stations experimented with Dolby noise reduction and quadraphonic stereo broadcasting. During its classical programming, it turned off all processing, instead using competent board operators to ride gain.

In 1972, during Hurricane Agnes, WYZZ was the only Northeast Pennsylvania radio station to remain on the air and deliver vital information to the public, thanks to having its own generators and microwave STL, with both its studio and transmitter located high out of the flood area.

=== WMGS ===
The station was sold to Susquehanna Broadcasting the spring of 1985. The sale only included the transmitter and license. The building, music library, and licensing rights to the "Whiz Radio" unit were retained by Dick Evans Sr. The station went silent at 11:59 p.m. on March 12, 1985, as the ownership changed.

WMGS Magic 93 debuted the next morning on March 12 at 6 a.m. It began playing adult contemporary music. Core artists included Billy Joel, Madonna, The Beatles, Carly Simon, Hall and Oates, Carole King, James Taylor, Phil Collins, Stevie Wonder, Kenny Loggins, Elton John and Diana Ross & The Supremes. The station played a mix of the 1960s, 1970s and 1980s titles with a few current songs each hour. In the 1990s artists like Mariah Carey, Hootie & The Blowfish, Janet Jackson, Lionel Richie, Celine Dion and Sheryl Crow were added. The station targeted adult women, especially at work.

In 1997, WMGS, and sister station WARM were sold to Citadel Broadcasting. Magic 93's AC format continued, though the station updated its playlist to titles from 1980 to the current day, with an occasional 1970s hit. Citadel merged with Cumulus Media on September 16, 2011.
