= WBAX =

WBAX may refer to:

- WBAX-LD, a defunct low-power television station (channel 32, virtual 47) formerly licensed to serve Albany, New York, United States
- WFUZ (AM), a radio station (1240 AM) licensed to serve Wilkes-Barre, Pennsylvania, United States, which held the call sign WBAX from 1922 to 2018
