= Michael Mehl (photographer) =

Michael Mehl is a photographer and composer based in San Antonio, Texas, who co-founded the Fotoseptiembre-SAfoto festival. He curates the annual Fotoseptiembre festival, held each September in San Antonio, the Hill Country, and other cities in South Texas.

== Biography ==
By the age of 15, Mehl was a composer and professional musician. He subsequently developed an interest in photography. From 1995 to 2005, he served as the curator for the Airport Art Spaces. In 1995, he curated the first exhibition at San Antonio's new Main Library, and he did the same for the City of San Antonio International Center in 1998. He and his wife, Ann Kinser, cofounded Fotoseptiembre, an ongoing festival, in 1995. Its original goal, he says, "was to create a platform where anyone could participate, essentially a community-based photography festival." Through the festival, he has "shepherded... the proliferation of image-making options derived from the analog-to-digital switch." As Jack Morgan noted, "The advent of digital photography greatly reduced the cost of shooting," diminishing what Mehl calls "the barrier for entry" for picture takers to exhibit their photographs.

== Fotoseptiembre ==
Fotoseptiembre is an open, non-hierarchical festival that Mehl calls "the only community-based photography festival in the world." According to Mehl, Fotoseptiembre exhibitions are "organized and presented by artists and galleries on their own." They register with Fotoseptiembre, and Mehl and Kinser "coordinate, promote, and document all the exhibits." He sees the festival as serving two primary communities, the "metro San Antonio/Hill Country/Austin area," and "our international community of associates (festivals, curators, photography organizations, foundations, etc.)."

The impetus for starting he festival was partially archival. Mehl notes the frustration of undertaking the trouble and expense mounting an exhibition "only to find that when the exhibit was over there was no contextual record of it, no legacy, no contextual archive."

Mehl has mentored many photographers, such as emerging photographer Garcia Jones, who he invited to be part of a proposed traveling exhibition of San Antonio women. When the show fell through, "he offered an even better opportunity: her own monograph to be shown in the Fotoseptiembre’s SAFOTO Web Galleries, and he offered to curate it himself."

In 2015, James Courtney wrote in the San Antonio Current: "For 20 years, Fotoseptiembre, through its various incarnations, has been a bright spot in San Antonio arts, exhibiting photographic work from a geographically and aesthetically diverse cast of photographers."

According to Courtney, "Since 1995, the homegrown, internationally renowned photography festival has consistently brought out the best in local photographers, curators and arts organizations while also bringing in important photographers from all over the world and increasingly drawing the attention of the wider art/photography establishment to San Antonio." Mehl believes a trend has developed in which exhibitions have gone "from being random showings of personal artistic expression, into a more professional context of exhibitions as curatorial statements."

Due to the recession, in 2017, Fotoseptiembre dropped the registration fee. In 2020, due to the pandemic, Fotoseptiembre mostly went virtual. Jasmina Wellinghoff showcased the 2001 Fotoseptiembre festival for Arts Alive San Antonio.

The festival celebrated its 30th anniversary in 2024, and a diverse portfolio of images was reproduced in San Antonio Magazine.
