= WHLM =

WHLM may refer to:

- WHLM (AM), a radio station (930 AM) licensed to serve Bloomsburg, Pennsylvania, United States
- WMMZ, a radio station (103.5 FM) licensed to serve Berwick, Pennsylvania, which held the call sign WHLM-FM from 2006 to 2017
