= WEZX =

- Scranton, Pennsylvania; United States
- Broadcast area: Northeastern Pennsylvania
- Frequency: 106.9 MHz (HD Radio)
- Branding: Rock 107

Programming
- Format: Classic rock
- Subchannels: HD2: Simulcast of WQFM (classic hits); HD3: Alternative rock "Fuzz 96.1"; HD4: Catholic radio "JMJ Catholic Radio"
- Affiliations: United Stations Radio Networks

Ownership
- Owner: Times-Shamrock Communications; (Times Shamrock Media, L.P.)
- Sister stations: WEJL; WFUZ; WLGD; WQFM; WQFN

History
- First air date: 1967

Technical information
- Licensing authority: FCC
- Facility ID: 66364
- Class: A
- ERP: 1,450 watts (analog); 58 watts (digital)
- HAAT: 188 meters (617 ft)
- Transmitter coordinates: 41°20′52.2″N 75°39′1.6″W
- Translators: See § Simulcasts and translators; HD2: See WQFM (FM) § Translators; HD4: (104.5 MHz) W283BE (Scranton)
- Repeater: See § Simulcasts and translators

Links
- Public license information: Public file; LMS
- Webcast: Listen live; HD3: listen.streamon.fm/wezxhd3
- Website: rock107.com; HD3: fuzz961.com

WEZX (106.9 FM, "Rock 107") is a commercial radio station licensed to serve Scranton, Pennsylvania. The station is owned by Times-Shamrock Communications, through licensee Times Shamrock Media, L.P., and broadcasts a classic rock format.

WEZX programming is simulcast on WPZX (105.9 FM) in Pocono Pines, WLGD (107.7 FM) in Dallas, WFUZ (1240 AM) in Wilkes-Barre, and on seven translators. The station's programming is also available via streaming on the station's website.

WEZX uses HD Radio, and simulcasts sister station WQFM on its HD2 subchannel and an alternative rock format (as Fuzz 96.1) on its HD3 subchannel. The HD4 subchannel is leased to JMJ Catholic Radio, a regional Catholic radio network.

== History ==
The station signed on for the first time in 1967. In the early 1970s, Times-Shamrock branded the station "FM 107" with a soft rock format. The format was changed to rock in 1980 and the station rebranded as "Rock 107".

In 2000, sister station WPZX began simulcasting WEZX programming, followed by WVZX (now WHNB) in 2007.

WEZX celebrated 30 years as "Rock 107" in 2010.

The station commenced digital broadcasting on August 15, 2011.

In May 2021, Times-Shamrock purchased WLGD and made it a simulcast of WEZX.

== Simulcasts and translators ==
Two full-power stations are licensed to simulcast the programming of WEZX:

Call sign	Frequency	City of license	Facility ID	Power W	ERP W	Height m (ft)	Class	Transmitter coordinates	Call sign assigned
WPZX	105.9 FM	Pocono Pines, Pennsylvania	88753		5,000	103 m (338 ft)	A	41°8′17.3″N 75°33′33.6″W	February 23, 2000
WLGD	107.7 FM	Dallas, Pennsylvania	19564		2,350	162 m (531 ft)	A	41°18′54.3″N 75°53′17.7″W	June 15, 2021
WFUZ	1240 AM	Wilkes-Barre, Pennsylvania	66365	1,000			C	41°15′13″N 75°54′25″W	December 28, 2020

WEZX programming is broadcast on the following translators:

Broadcast translators for WEZX, WPZX, and WFUZ
Call sign	Frequency	City of license	FID	ERP (W)	HAAT	Class	Transmitter coordinates	FCC info	Notes
W264CP	100.7 FM	Clarks Green, Pennsylvania	142925	25	223 m (732 ft)	D	41°28′1.2″N 75°41′10.6″W	LMS	Relays WEZX
W288DF	105.5 FM	Mount Pocono, Pennsylvania	145873	30	252 m (827 ft)	D	41°02′39.6″N 75°22′37.7″W	LMS	Relays WPZX
W297AF	107.3 FM	Scranton, Pennsylvania	87498	250	−70 m (−230 ft)	D	41°24′34.3″N 75°39′59.7″W	LMS	Relays WEZX
W295CV	106.9 FM	Hazleton, Pennsylvania	201537	6	0 m (0 ft)	D	40°58′10.3″N 75°57′22.7″W	LMS	Relays WFUZ

Broadcast translators for WEZX-HD3
Call sign	Frequency	City of license	FID	ERP (W)	HAAT	Class	Transmitter coordinates	FCC info
W241AZ	96.1 FM	Scranton, Pennsylvania	145790	85	228.5 m (750 ft)	D	41°28′1″N 75°41′12″W (NAD27)	LMS
W241BB	96.1 FM	Wilkes-Barre, Pennsylvania	143060	6	251.8 m (826 ft)	D	41°11′11.3″N 75°51′31.7″W	LMS

On July 10, 2024, WEZX-HD3 ended the simulcast of WEJL and flipped the subchannel and its translators to alternative rock as "Fuzz 96.1", thus returning a format heard on then-WFUZ until 2020, with Times-Shamrock citing listener demand. Beginning with the 2025 season, Fuzz 96.1 also carries all games of Minor League Baseball's Scranton/Wilkes-Barre RailRiders.

Broadcast translator for WEZX-HD4
Call sign	Frequency	City of license	FID	ERP (W)	HAAT	Class	Transmitter coordinates	FCC info
W283BE	104.5 FM	Scranton, Pennsylvania	156961	85	228.5 m (750 ft)	D	41°25′36″N 75°44′51″W (NAD83)	LMS

WEZX-HD4 and W283BE began carrying JMJ Catholic Radio in February 2023 as a replacement for WQOR, which had become a simulcast of WGMF; W283BF had previously been a WGMF translator.
