= Times-Shamrock Communications =

American media company

- Type: Private
- Industry: Mass media
- Genre: Radio broadcasting; Billboard advertising
- Founded: 1895; 131 years ago
- Founder: E.J. Lynett
- Headquarters: Scranton, Pennsylvania, United States
- Website: timesshamrock.com

Times-Shamrock Communications is an American media company based in Scranton, Pennsylvania. The company, owned by the Lynett and Haggerty families of Scranton, lists among its assets nine radio stations.

== Assets ==
=== Radio stations ===
- WEJL Scranton, Pennsylvania
- WEZX/WPZX/WFUZ/WLGD Scranton, Pennsylvania
- WQFM/WQFN Scranton, Pennsylvania

In January 2008, Times-Shamrock Communications launched the570.com, a regional entertainment portal covering the 570 area code.

== Former properties ==
In April 2013, it was announced that Stephens Media Group would acquire KTSO and KMYZ-FM in Tulsa from Times-Shamrock for $8.5 million.

The affected stations were:

- KMYZ-FM, Tulsa, Oklahoma (city of license: Pryor, Oklahoma)
- KTSO, Tulsa, Oklahoma (city of license: Glenpool, Oklahoma)

In August 2013, Times-Shamrock announced it would divest several of its properties in order to focus the company on northeastern Pennsylvania.

The divested properties:

- Baltimore City Paper (purchased by the Baltimore Sun Media Group)
- Cleveland Scene (purchased by Euclid Media Group)
- Detroit Metro Times (purchased by Euclid Media Group)
- Orlando Weekly (purchased by Euclid Media Group)
- San Antonio Current (purchased by Euclid Media Group)
- Virgin Islands Daily News (sold to Virgin Islands businessman Archie Nahigian)
- The Progress-Index (purchased by GateHouse Media)

In October 2015, Times-Shamrock announced another major divestment of several newspaper properties. The divested properties were all part of the Towanda Printing Company business segment. Sample News Group, of Huntingdon, Pennsylvania, acquired the properties. Also included in the sale was the Towanda Printing Company printing facility. The divested properties include:

- The Daily Review (Towanda, Pennsylvania)
- The News-Item (Shamokin, Pennsylvania)
- Bradford-Sullivan Pennysaver (Towanda, Pennsylvania)
- The Citizen-Standard (Valley View, Pennsylvania)
- The Farmer's Friend (Towanda, Pennsylvania)
- The Northeast Driller (Sayre, Pennsylvania)
- The Owego Pennysaver (Owego, New York)
- Susquehanna County Independent (Montrose, Pennsylvania)
- The Troy Pennysaver (Troy, Pennsylvania)
- The Weekender (Montrose, Pennsylvania)

In July 2017, it was announced that Times-Shamrock was selling its radio stations in the Reno, Nevada, market to Entravision. KRZQ was not included in the sale, as it was sold separately to John Burkavage's Bighorn Media.

The affected stations were:

- KRZQ, Reno, Nevada (city of license: Fallon, Nevada)
- KZTI, Reno, Nevada (city of license: Fallon Station, Nevada)
- KWNZ, Lovelock, Nevada
- KNEZ, Fernley, Nevada

In August 2023, Times-Shamrock announced it had sold its remaining four daily newspapers, including its flagship title, The Times-Tribune, to Colorado-based MediaNews Group, owned by Alden Global Capital. The sale includes weekly and periodic newspapers and commercial printing operations—Absolute Distribution Inc. and Times-Shamrock Creative Services.

The daily newspapers sold included:

- The Times-Tribune, Scranton, Pennsylvania
- The Citizens' Voice, Wilkes-Barre, Pennsylvania
- The Standard-Speaker, Hazleton, Pennsylvania
- The Republican & Herald, Pottsville, Pennsylvania

The weekly newspapers sold included:

- The Abington Suburban
- The Triboro Banner
- The Valley Advantage
- The Pocono Times
- Wyoming County Press Examiner, Tunkhannock, Pennsylvania
- Ithaca & Tri-Village Pennysaver

In August 2025, Milwaukee Radio Alliance (a partnership between Shamrock Communications, Times-Shamrock's broadcasting affiliate, and Willie Davis's All-Pro Broadcasting, Inc.) announced that it would sell WLUM-FM and WLDB to Educational Media Foundation for $4 million. Weeks later in September, it was announced that Civic Media would acquire WZTI and its FM translators from Milwaukee Radio Alliance for $465,000.

The affected stations were:

- WLDB, Milwaukee, Wisconsin
- WLUM, Milwaukee, Wisconsin
- WZTI, Greenfield, Wisconsin

In June 2025, Shamrock Communications announced that it would sell its Baltimore radio station, WZBA, to K-Love Inc. (the former Educational Media Foundation) for $2.6 million.

The affected station was:

- WZBA, Baltimore, Maryland (city of license: Westminster, Maryland)
