= Euclid Media Group =

Euclid Media Group (EMG) was a media company in the United States, operating 2013-2023. It was headquartered in Cleveland, Ohio and owned the Orlando Weekly, Cincinnati CityBeat, Cleveland Scene, Creative Loafing (Tampa), Detroit Metro Times, Riverfront Times (St. Louis), San Antonio Current, Out In SA and Out in STL.

== History ==
Times-Shamrock Communications sold Cleveland Scene, Detroit Metro Times, Orlando Weekly and the San Antonio Current to EMG in December 2013. EMG merged Detroit Metro Times and alt-weekly Real Detroit in 2014. The company purchased Tampa Bay based publication Creative Loafing and the Cincinnati CityBeat in 2018.

The company dissolved in August 2023. Four of the newspapers, including Orlando Weekly, Cleveland Scene and Creative Loafing came under the ownership of Chava Communications, an entity created by Michael Wagner and his wife, Cassandra Yardeni Wagner to purchase the Euclid Media publications. The other four, Riverfront Times, Detroit Metro Times, Cincinnati CityBeat and Louisville Eccentric Observer, were sold to Chris Keating, operating under the name Big Lou Holdings LLC.
