= WLGD =

WLGD may refer to:

- WLGD (FM), a radio station (107.7 FM) licensed to serve Dallas, Pennsylvania, United States
- WLGD (Mississippi), a defunct radio station (102.3 FM) formerly licensed to serve Calhoun City, Mississippi, United States
- WZNN (FM), a radio station (106.3 FM) licensed to serve Maplesville, Alabama, United States, which held the call sign WLGD from 2012 to 2014
- WRMR (FM), a radio station (98.7 FM) licensed to serve Jacksonville, North Carolina, United States and formerly known as WLGD
- WYDE (AM), a radio station (1260 AM) licensed to serve Birmingham, Alabama, and formerly known as WLGD
