= KWNZ =

Radio station in Lovelock, Nevada

- Lovelock, Nevada; United States
- Broadcast area: Reno, Nevada
- Frequency: 106.3 MHz
- Branding: Latino 106.3

Programming
- Language: Spanish
- Format: Contemporary hit radio; Latin pop; reggaeton

Ownership
- Owner: Lazer Media; (Lazer Licenses, LLC)
- Sister stations: KZTI; KNEZ

History
- First air date: May 6, 2013
- Call sign meaning: K-WiNZ (Previous branding)

Technical information
- Licensing authority: FCC
- Facility ID: 164200
- Class: C
- ERP: 100,000 watts
- HAAT: 600 meters (2,000 ft)
- Transmitter coordinates: 39°54′46″N 118°55′18″W
- Repeater: 106.3 KWNZ-FM1 (Reno)

Links
- Public license information: Public file; LMS

KWNZ (106.3 FM) is a commercial American radio station licensed to Lovelock, Nevada, broadcasting a Spanish Top 40 (CHR) format as "Latino 106.3". The station is owned by Lazer Media.

== History ==
=== 106-3 Pop-FM ===
On May 6, 2013 at 1:06 pm, KWNZ signed as 106-3 Pop-FM with a rhythmic adult contemporary format. The first song was "Pop Muzik" by M. On July 22, 2013, The station debuted their on-air lineup with Freddie Bueno hosting mornings, Melody Minx in middays, KWNZ alum "Wild Bill" Shakespeare in afternoons and Reno radio vet Rick Carter at night.

In March 2014, KWNZ added the syndicated The Bert Show for mornings and Matt Million for middays, who previously held down the midday shift on the original 97.3 KWNZ in the 1990s.

=== All Hit Radio ===
On November 14, 2014, KWNZ dropped the rhythmic adult contemporary format for Top 40/CHR as 106.3 Pop-FM, All Hit Radio. The on-air lineup remained the same until February 2015, when The Bert Show was dropped for local host AJ Miller. By late 2015, all air talent had been dropped from the station, with the exception of morning host, AJ Miller, who exited in February 2017. The rest of the day ran automated.

On August 3, 2017, it was announced that Shamrock Communications was exiting the Reno radio market and KWNZ was being sold to Lazer Broadcasting along with its two sister stations, KZTI and KNEZ. Its third sister station KRZQ was sold to locally owned Bighorn Media and flipped formats to adult standards.

=== Latino 106.3 ===
In Early August 2017, all traces of the Pop-FM's social media and website were deleted, hinting at a new format for the station in the near future.

On August 18, 2017, KWNZ changed formats to Spanish Top 40 as "Latino 106.3".
