= Orlando Weekly =

American alternative newspaper

- AAN award winning cover of the June 6–12, 2018 Orlando Weekly, by Chris "Tobar" Rodriguez.
- Type: Alternative weekly
- Owner: Chava Communications
- Publisher: Michael Wagner
- Editor: Jessica Bryce Young
- Founded: 1990 (print), 1998 (online)
- Headquarters: 16 W. Pine Street, Orlando, FL, 32801
- Circulation: 40,000
- Website: orlandoweekly.com

Orlando Weekly is a liberal progressive alternative newsweekly distributed in the Greater Orlando area of Florida. Every Wednesday, 40,000 issues of the paper are distributed to more than 1,100 locations across Orange, Osceola and Seminole counties.

Orlando Weekly organizes an annual feature Best of Orlando issue that features the best Orlando has to offer in dining, music and nightlife, arts and culture, goods and services. Each year readers vote in the paper's poll to vote for their favorite Orlando restaurants, bars, boutiques, museums, local celebs and more. The paper also publishes an annual dining guide called BITE, which features capsule reviews of hundreds of area restaurants, and an Annual Manual, an insider's guide to the region.

== History ==
The paper was founded in the 1980s as the Orange Shopper. It was purchased by the Toronto Sun, which changed its name to the Weekly and transformed it into a tabloid publication. The Weekly was later sold to the Detroit-based Alternative Media Inc., a publisher of alternative newsweekly Detroit Metro Times. Co-founder of Alternative Media Inc., Ron Williams, transformed the paper into not just a tabloid but an alternative news source dedicated to investigative journalism. In 1997, Alternative Media Inc. also purchased the San Antonio Current; by 1998, the company was entertaining multiple offers for its stable of weeklies.

In 2000, the papers were purchased by Times-Shamrock Communications. In 2013, Times-Shamrock sold the paper to Euclid Media Group. The company dissolved in August 2023 and the newspaper was sold to Chava Communications, an entity created by Michael Wagner and his wife, Cassandra Yardeni Wagner.

== Controversies ==
The paper has been historically critical of anti-homeless laws passed in Orlando, including a controversial city law that prohibits advocates for the homeless from feeding large groups of people in public spaces within two miles of Orlando's City Hall without a permit. Orlando Weekly has also taken a decidedly critical stance on controversial Republican Florida Gov. Rick Scott who took office in 2011, as well as recent legislative efforts to pass laws that infringe on women's rights.

In 2007, the paper ran afoul of Orlando's Metropolitan Bureau of Investigation when they staged a raid on the publication and arrested three of its advertising representatives for allegedly supporting prostitution. Daniel Aaronson, a longtime Fort Lauderdale criminal defense lawyer and First Amendment specialist, called the arrests and police actions "incredibly repugnant." Aaronson said the Weekly did nothing wrong if they simply took and ran adult-oriented advertisements."The papers aren't doing anything illegal. They're taking ads. If an ad uses suggestive language, the stopping of these ads threatens the First Amendment," said Aaronson, who has represented adult entertainment clubs, bookstores, and swinger clubs. The paper considers this act retaliation for past negative coverage of the agency. On February 27, 2008, the Metropolitan Bureau of Investigation dropped all charges in the criminal case.
