= Joseph H. Zerbey =

Newspaper proprietor (1858–1933)

Joseph Henry Zerbey (June 14, 1858 – February 2, 1933) was a newspaper proprietor and author in the United States. He founded the Daily Republican newspaper (now the Republican Herald) in Pottsville, Pennsylvania, in 1884.

Zerbey was born in Pottsville, Pennsylvania to William Merkel and Sarah Louise (Miller) Zerbey. An 1875 graduate of Pottsville High School, on June 15, 1880 he wed Cora Elizabeth Siegfried, the daughter of General Joshua K. Sigfried.

He owned and edited the Pottsville Daily Republican and Schuylkill Republican. He wrote to Theodore Roosevelt about Schuylkill County and invited him to its centennial celebration in 1911.

Col. Joseph H. Zerbey Jr. (October 18, 1888-February 16, 1945) worked with his father at the newspaper and served in World War I. He lived at 18th Street and Howard Avenue in Pottsville. Division of his estate was litigated.

Joe Zerbey III served in the U.S. Army's aviation division managed the family's newspaper, was a pilot, and helped establish the Schuylkill County Airport, also known as Schuylkill County Joe Zerbey Airport. Joseph H. Zerbey IV had a career running newspapers.

== Writings ==
- History of Pottsville and Schuylkill County (1934–1935), republished from newspaper stories
- Florida as Seen in 1929: The Nation's Playground and Scenes en Route
- The South as Seen in 1930 (1930)
- The East Coast of Florida (1931)
