= WEJL =

- Scranton, Pennsylvania; United States
- Broadcast area: Scranton–Wilkes-Barre; Northeastern Pennsylvania
- Frequency: 630 kHz
- Branding: Sports Radio WEJL

Programming
- Format: Sports
- Affiliations: Fox Sports Radio; Westwood One Sports; Philadelphia Phillies Radio Network; Pittsburgh Steelers Radio Network

Ownership
- Owner: Times-Shamrock Communications; (Times Shamrock Media, L.P.)
- Sister stations: WEZX/WPZX; WFUZ; WLGD; WQFM/WQFN

History
- First air date: January 8, 1923
- Former call signs: WQAN (1922–1955)
- Call sign meaning: Edward J. Lynett (publisher of The Scranton Times).

Technical information
- Licensing authority: FCC
- Facility ID: 66363
- Class: D
- Power: 2,000 watts day; 32 watts night
- Transmitter coordinates: 41°24′34″N 75°40′01″W
- Translators: 94.1 W231EB (Larksville); 100.5 W263AL (Scranton); 102.7 W274AO (Scranton)

Links
- Public license information: Public file; LMS
- Webcast: Listen live
- Website: sportsradiowejl.com

WEJL (630 AM) is a radio station broadcasting in Scranton, Pennsylvania. The station, known on-air as "Sports Radio WEJL", carries sports radio programming from Fox Sports Radio. WEJL is owned by Times-Shamrock Communications, former publishers of Scranton's daily newspaper, The Times-Tribune.

The station serves as the Northeastern Pennsylvania outlet for Philadelphia Phillies baseball, Pittsburgh Steelers football, Notre Dame football and Villanova Wildcats basketball.

== History ==
=== Early years ===
Effective December 1, 1921, the U.S. Department of Commerce, which regulated radio communication at this time, adopted regulations to formally establish a broadcast service category. It set aside the wavelength of 360 meters (833 kHz) for "entertainment" broadcasting, and 485 meters (619 kHz) for "market and weather reports". By mid-1922 hundreds of radio stations had been established, many of which were owned by, or had close affiliations, with newspapers.

In November 1922, the Radio Sales Corporation in Scranton, headed by J. H. "Casey" Jones, received a broadcasting station license with the call sign WRAY. E. J. Lynett, publisher of The Scranton Times (now The Times-Tribune), believed radio was a natural business for a newspaper, and decided to get involved in the new medium as well. He contracted with Radio Sales to also construct a station for the Times, and in the meantime made arrangements to provide programming for WRAY, beginning on November 29, 1922.

The Times was issued its first broadcasting station license, with the sequentially assigned call letters of WQAN, on January 4, 1923. (WRAY remained licensed to the Radio Sales Corporation until it was deleted in mid-1924.) WQAN made its debut broadcast on January 8, 1923, under the slogan "The Voice of the Anthracite". (Anthracite coal was mined nearby.)

WQAN's initial grant authorized broadcasting on the 360 meter "entertainment" wavelength. In early 1923 the station was further authorized for the 485 meter "market and weather report" wavelength. Later that year it was reassigned to 1070 kHz. In late 1924 WQAN changed frequency to 1200 kHz, which was followed in 1927 by a move to 1300 kHz, now sharing the frequency with Scranton's other station, WGBI (now WAAF). WQAN and WGBI were moved to 880 kHz on November 11, 1928 as part of a major reallocation made under the provisions of the Federal Radio Commission's General Order 40. In 1941, implementation of the North American Regional Broadcasting Agreement (NARBA) resulted in the two stations changing their shared frequency to 910 kHz.

=== Move to AM 630 ===
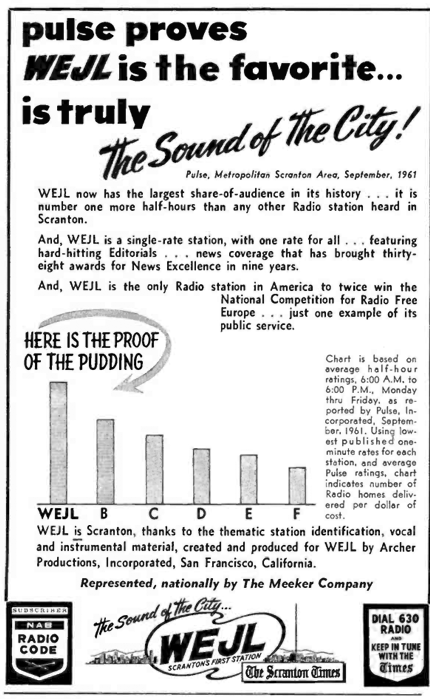
1962 station advertisement.

The frequency sharing agreement between WQAN and WGBI lasted for 21 years, ending in 1948 when the Lynett family built a tower atop the Times Building in downtown Scranton for WQAN-FM at 92.3 MHz, and at the same time WQAN moved to 630 AM, transmitting from the same tower, which remains in use today.

WQAN-FM's call sign was changed in the early 1950s to WEJL-FM. The FM station was shut down in July 1955, and WQAN was renamed WEJL. The new call letters were chosen in honor of longtime publisher E. J. Lynett, who had died in 1943.

For decades, WEJL transmitted with 500 watts as a daytimer, required to go off the air at night to avoid interfering with other stations on AM 630. WEJL has since boosted its daytime power to 2,000 watts and received a low-power nighttime authorization of 32 watts.

=== Sports radio ===
During the 1960s through the 1980s, WEJL was a full service radio station, playing middle of the road music with news, sports and talk. Its news updates at 12:30 pm and 4:30 pm, along with mine working schedules, were an institution in Scranton. Its news updates came from the staff of the co-owned Scranton Times and the ABC Information Network. It adopted its current sports radio format in the 1990s, with a mix of local sports shows and national sports programming from ESPN Radio. Gradually, most locally-produced programming was phased out, with national ESPN shows taking up nearly all of the schedule. One of the few local programs on the station is "The Beer Breakfast" featuring host Neil Trama's interviews with brewers, local hospitality industry personalities, and various celebrities airing Saturday mornings at 9:00 AM.

In 1994, the Lynetts bought 1240 WBAX in Wilkes-Barre (now WFUZ) to fill in the gaps in WEJL's coverage. Although WEJL's daytime signal decently covers Wilkes-Barre, much of the southern part of the market (for instance, Hazleton) gets only a grade B signal due to the area's rugged terrain. At night, it must power down to 32 watts, limiting its nighttime coverage to Lackawanna County.

In 2008, the stations applied for permission to rebroadcast on FM translators W241AZ (96.1 Dunmore) and W241BB (96.1 Wilkes-Barre). In 2010, Times-Shamrock bought WQFN in Forest City, changed its call letters to WQFM and turned it into a full-power simulcast of WEJL. In April 2012 W263AL in Avoca at 100.5 began rebroadcasting WEJL and at the same time W241AZ in Dunmore switched to Clarks Summit and began rebroadcasting WFUZ through WEZX-HD2. In July 2013 WQFM changed its call sign to WEJL-FM. On November 15, 2021 WEJL-FM changed their call letters to WQFN and switched to a simulcast of hot adult contemporary-formatted WQFM 92.1 FM Nanticoke. In December 2021, WFUZ split from simulcasting with WEJL.

On July 1, 2024, WEJL switched its affiliation from ESPN Radio to Fox Sports Radio, while also rebranding as "Sports Radio WEJL" and switching from the 96.1 W241BB Wilkes-Barre translator to the 102.7 W274AO Scranton translator.

== Previous logos ==
Logo used until 2011.

Logo used until 2021
