= The Progress-Index =

Newspaper in Virginia

Progress-Index
- Type: Daily newspaper
- Owner: USA Today Co.
- Founded: July 4, 1865
- Headquarters: 15 Franklin St. Petersburg, Virginia
- Circulation: 4,416 Daily; 5,611 Sunday (as of 2021)
- Website: progress-index.com

The Progress-Index is a daily newspaper published in Petersburg, Virginia. Its print edition is published Monday through Sunday morning, and its website is updated regularly throughout the day with breaking news, feature stories, photographs and videos.

== History ==
The paper's roots trace to 1865, but its current moniker came about through the early-1920s merger of the Index-Appeal and the Evening Progress. It was owned by various Petersburg businessmen until 1959, when Thomson Newspapers of Canada purchased it. Thomson owned The Progress-Index until 1997, when it sold it to Times-Shamrock Communications, a privately held media company based in Scranton, Pennsylvania. Its current building, at 15 Franklin St. in downtown Petersburg, was built in 1921, along with what was then a state-of-the-art press. This was before the merger of the two papers into The Index-Appeal & Evening Progress, shortened to The Progress-Index in 1923. In 2014, Times-Shamrock sold The Progress-Index to New Media Investment Group.

In January 2018, after the closing of the Hopewell News and Mid VA Trading Post by owners Lancaster Media, The Progress-Index launched the twice weekly Hopewell Herald/Prince George Post and weekly classified Mid VA Trader.
