= WBHT =

Radio station in Mountain Top, Pennsylvania

- Mountain Top, Pennsylvania; United States
- Broadcast area: Wilkes-Barre – Scranton - Hazleton
- Frequency: 97.1 MHz
- Branding: Hot 97.1

Programming
- Format: Top 40-CHR
- Affiliations: United Stations Radio Networks; Westwood One

Ownership
- Owner: Cumulus Media; (Radio License Holding CBC, LLC)
- Sister stations: WBSX, WMGS, WSJR

History
- First air date: September 1992; 34 years ago
- Former call signs: WYRM (1992); WYXY (1992–1993)
- Call sign meaning: "Hot"

Technical information
- Licensing authority: FCC
- Facility ID: 20465
- Class: A
- ERP: 500 watts
- HAAT: 336 meters (1,102 ft)
- Transmitter coordinates: 41°10′57.2″N 75°52′17.7″W

Links
- Public license information: Public file; LMS
- Webcast: Listen live
- Website: www.hot971radio.com

WBHT (97.1 FM "Hot 97.1") is a commercial radio station licensed to Mountain Top, Pennsylvania, and serving the Wilkes-Barre–Scranton–Hazleton radio market. It airs a Top 40-CHR format and is owned by Cumulus Media with studios on Baltimore Drive in Wilkes-Barre. In morning drive time, it carries The Bert Show from sister station WWWQ in Atlanta.

WBHT has an effective radiated power (ERP) of 500 watts. Its transmitter tower is on Penobscot Knob, an 2,100 foot (641 m) tall peak, so its signal can be heard around much of Northeastern Pennsylvania.

== History ==
In September 1992, WBHT signed on the air. It has always had a contemporary hits - Top 40 format. Originally it was owned by Fairview Communications with studios on Wilkes-Barre - Scranton Highway in Avoca.

For most of the early 2000s, WBHT 97.1 was simulcast with sister station WBHD 95.7 in Olyphant. On March 10, 2025, WBHD split from its simulcast with WBHT and switched to a simulcast with co-owned country music-formatted WSJR 93.7 FM in Dallas.

Former logo

Previous logo
