= WSJR =

Dallas, Pennsylvania; United States
- Broadcast area: Wilkes-Barre - Scranton
- Frequency: 93.7 MHz
- Branding: Cat Country 93.7 & 95.7

Programming
- Format: Country
- Affiliations: Westwood One

Ownership
- Owner: Cumulus Media; (Radio License Holding CBC, LLC)
- Sister stations: WBHT, WBSX, WMGS

History
- First air date: 1988 (as WDLS)
- Former call signs: WDLS (1988–1998); WCTD (1998–2000); WBSX (2000–2002); WCWQ (2002–2004)
- Call sign meaning: JR 93.7 (former branding)

Technical information
- Licensing authority: FCC
- Facility ID: 43969
- Class: A
- ERP: 1,450 watts
- HAAT: 207 meters (679 ft)
- Repeater: 95.7 WBHD (Olyphant)

Links
- Public license information: Public file; LMS
- Webcast: Listen live
- Website: catcountry937.com

Satellite station
- WBHD

Olyphant, Pennsylvania; United States
- Broadcast area: Scranton
- Frequency: 95.7 MHz

History
- First air date: 1991; 35 years ago
- Former call signs: WZZV (1991–1993); WINH (1993); WKQV (1993–1999); WXAR (1999–2001); WEOZ (2001–2002)
- Call sign meaning: Similar to WBHT

Technical information
- Facility ID: 43521
- Class: A
- ERP: 600 watts
- HAAT: 308 meters (1,010 ft)
- Transmitter coordinates: 41°26′9.2″N 75°43′43.6″W

Links
- Public license information: Public file; LMS

WSJR (93.7 FM) is a commercial radio station licensed to Dallas, Pennsylvania, and serving the Wilkes-Barre - Scranton radio market. It is owned by Cumulus Media and has a country music radio format, known as "Cat Country 93.7 & 95.7" with the slogan "Northeast PA's Best Country."

== History ==
The station signed on the air on Memorial Day, 1989, as WDLS. It was operated by local broadcast engineer and bodybuilder Ron Schacht and his wife Denise for several years before being sold to a Carbondale radio group. The format was a mix of classic and contemporary country music with the emphasis on the older country hits. The station was somewhat of an experimental lab as continuous experiments were done on antenna types, transmitter modifications and audio processing. During this time, it strived to be the best sounding FM station in the area and placed an emphasis on its technical quality. The station had a small but dedicated staff and with the management and staff was quite successful.f

Originally it operated with an effective radiated power (ERP) of 3,000 watts but soon increased that to 6,000 watts. Its studio and transmitter were atop Plymouth Mountain. When it was sold by the original owners, Mountain Broadcasting, the studios were moved from the transmitter site to Clarks Summit, Pa, then to the Citadel complex on East Mountain in Wilkes Barre. The transmitter remained on Plymouth Mountain. The site was the original site of WMJW licensed to Nanticoke, Pa. on 92.1 but that station was relocated to Penobscot Mountain.

After the Schacht's sold the station in 1998, the station rebranded as "Cat Country 93.7" with new call letters WCTD implemented along with the change. On December 15, 2000, after stunting with a computerized countdown, the station flipped to modern rock as "93.7X" with new call letters WBSX. In May 2002, WBSX began simulcasting on sister station WAOZ in preparation for a frequency move, which was completed by June. Though there were plans to flip 93.7 FM back country with new call letters WCWQ, the stations continued to simulcast. In April 2004, the stations officially broke the simulcast, and 93.7 FM flipped back to country, this time as "JR 93.7" with new call letters WSJR.

On February 24, 2012, WSJR rebranded from "JR 93.7" to "Great Country 93.7". At 3 PM on July 3, 2013, the station became "Nash FM 93.7." Station Program Directors included Mark (Stevens) Lindow, who left in early March 2015. He was replaced by Mike Vincent, who officially started on April 1, 2015. Vincent did weekday afternoons and led the station to have a more contemporary feel. After Mike Vincent departed from the station, Dave Savage took over as afternoon drive and assistant program director until exiting the company in December 2019. Laura G (on-air with sister station WBHT 97.1/95.7 BHT) is currently the program director.

On March 10, 2025, WSJR rebranded as "Cat Country 93.7 & 95.7", and began simulcasting on WBHD 95.7 FM Olyphant.

== Television ==
A pick-up truck with a JR 93.7 license plate, can be seen on The Office (U.S.) - Season 4 - Episode 14, "Chair Model" or Episode 10, if watching on Netflix @ 00:34.

== Previous logo ==
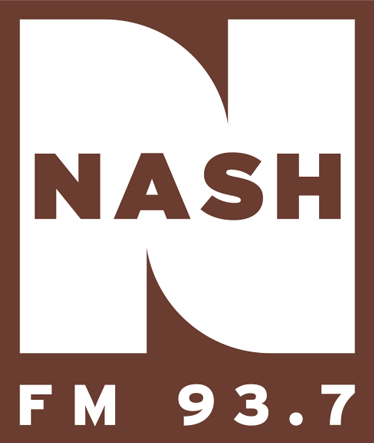
