= Republican Herald =

Daily newspaper in Pennsylvania, US

- Type: Daily newspaper
- Format: Broadsheet
- Owner: MediaNews Group
- Editor: Andy Heintzelman
- Founded: 1884
- Headquarters: 111 Mahantongo Street Pottsville, Pennsylvania 17901 United States
- ISSN: 1055-8403
- Website: republicanherald.com

The Republican Herald is a daily newspaper serving Pottsville, Schuylkill County, Pennsylvania. The newspaper is owned by MediaNews Group, a subsidiary of Alden Global Capital.

== History ==
The Republican-Herald was founded in 1884 as The Daily Republican by Joseph Henry Zerbey. In 1995, J.H. Zerbey Newspapers, Inc., the parent company of the Pottsville Republican, purchased the 120-year-old Shenandoah Evening Herald, to form the Pottsville Republican & Evening Herald. Times Shamrock Communications purchased J.H. Zerbey Newspapers and subsequently the newspaper in 2003. In 2004, the newspaper became a morning newspaper, renamed the Republican & Herald. In 2009, the "&" was dropped from the cover title.

In 2005, the paper had an average daily circulation of 26,747. As of 2019, newsstand prices were $1.00 for the daily edition and $2.00 for the combined Saturday/Sunday "Weekend Edition".

In 1979, writers Gilbert M. Gaul and Elliot G. Jaspin won a Pulitzer Prize for Local Investigative Specialized Reporting for stories on the destruction of the Blue Coal Company by men with ties to organized crime.

In August 2023, Times-Shamrock Communications sold the newspaper and three other daily newspapers to MediaNews Group, a subsidiary of Alden Global Capital.

== See also ==
- List of newspapers in Pennsylvania
