= WYCK =

Coordinates: 41.250104°N 75.824831°W

Simulcasting WWRR Scranton
- Plains Township, Pennsylvania; United States
- Broadcast area: Wilkes-Barre/Scranton
- Frequency: 1340 kHz
- Branding: The River, 105 & 103.5

Programming
- Format: Classic hits
- Affiliations: Compass Media Networks

Ownership
- Owner: Bold Gold Media
- Sister stations: WICK, WPSN

History
- First air date: January 31, 1925 (as WBRE in Wilkes-Barre)
- Former call signs: WBRE (1925–1980); WKRZ (1980–1987); WPLJ (1987–1988); WYOM (1988–1989); WBCR (1989–1991); WTSW (1991–1992)
- Former frequencies: 1300 kHz (1925–1927); 1200 kHz (1927–1928); 1310 kHz (1928–1941)
- Call sign meaning: similar to WICK

Technical information
- Licensing authority: FCC
- Facility ID: 36835
- Class: C
- Power: 810 watts unlimited
- Translators: 100.7 W264CG (Wilkes-Barre); 104.9 W285FT (Hazleton)

Links
- Public license information: Public file; LMS
- Webcast: Listen Live
- Website: therivernepa.com

WYCK (1340 AM) is a radio station that is owned by Bold Gold Media. Licensed to the city of Plains, it serves the Wilkes-Barre/Scranton radio market and broadcasts with 810 watts, non-directional.

WYCK simulcasts the classic hits format, branded as "The River 105 and 103-5", from WWRR 104.9 FM Scranton.

== History ==
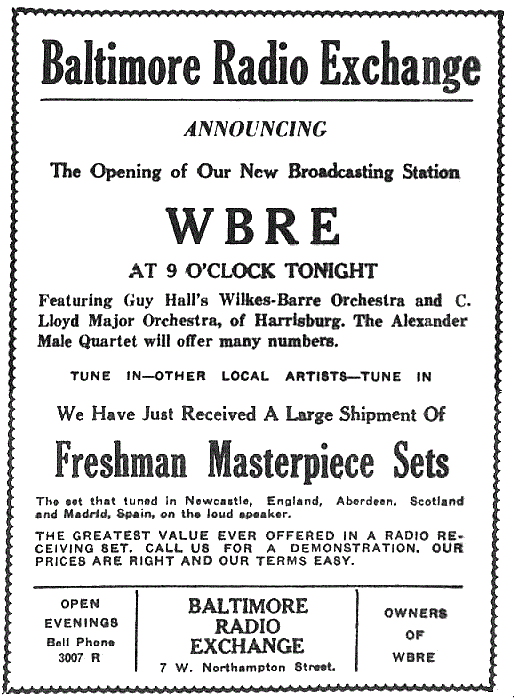
Advertisement for the station's debut broadcast, as WBRE in Wilkes-Barre, on January 31, 1925.

WYCK was first licensed on January 15, 1925 as WBRE, broadcasting on 1300 kHz with 10 watts, and licensed to the Baltimore Radio Exchange company at 17 West Northampton Street in Wilkes-Barre. WBRE made its debut broadcast on January 31, 1925. In 1927 ownership was transferred to Louis G. Baltimore.

Following the establishment of the Federal Radio Commission (FRC), stations were initially issued a series of temporary authorizations starting on May 3, 1927. On June 15, 1927 WBRE was assigned to 1200 kHz on a time shared basis with the other long time Wilkes-Barre station, WBAX (now WFUZ). Stations were also informed that if they wanted to continue operating, they needed to file a formal license application by January 15, 1928, as the first step in determining whether they met the new "public interest, convenience, or necessity" standard.

On May 25, 1928, the FRC issued General Order 32, which notified 164 stations, including WBRE, that "From an examination of your application for future license it does not find that public interest, convenience, or necessity would be served by granting it." However, the station successfully convinced the commission that it should remain licensed.

On November 11, 1928, under the provisions of a general reorganization resulting from the Federal Radio Commission's General Order 40, WBRE was shifted to full time operation on 1310 kHz.

The station remained at 1310 kHz until the North American Regional Broadcasting Agreement took effect in 1941, when most of the stations on its frequency, including WBRE, were moved to 1340 kHz.

For many years WBRE was an NBC radio affiliate. In 1953, it spawned Northeast Pennsylvania's first television station, WBRE-TV. In October 1980, the Baltimores sold off their radio interests, and the AM station's call letters were changed to WKRZ.

From 1987 to 1992 the station went through multiple ownership and format changes, resulting in numerous call sign changes, starting with WPLJ in late 1987, followed by WYOM, WBCR (with a Christian radio format), WTSW, and finally, in late 1992, WYCK, simulcasting Scranton's WICK.

After losing the lease on its tower site in Kingston, WYCK moved its transmitter to east of Wilkes-Barre near the VA Medical Center in the 1990s. As a result of this relocation the station had to change its community of license to Plains.

In 2006, Bold Gold dropped its Oldies radio format in favor of a sports format branded as "The Game", with programming for WYCK along with sister stations WICK located in Scranton and WCDL in Carbondale coming from Fox Sports Radio and Premiere Radio Networks's Jim Rome. "The Game" simulcast network also acted as the flagship for Scranton/Wilkes-Barre RailRiders AAA Minor League Baseball radio play-by-play coverage.

On September 23, 2015 WYCK switched to a simulcast of classic hits-formatted WWRR 104.9 FM Scranton.

During the springs and summers of 2016 through 2024, WYCK returned to a simulcast of WICK 1400 AM Scranton during Scranton/Wilkes-Barre RailRiders baseball games, in order to provide coverage for fans in Luzerne County who were unable to receive WICK.
