= WDNH-FM =

- Honesdale, Pennsylvania; United States
- Broadcast area: Hawley, Pennsylvania
- Frequency: 95.3 MHz
- Branding: 95.3 DNH The Rail

Programming
- Language: English
- Format: Top 40

Ownership
- Owner: Bold Gold Media Group, L.P.; (Bold Gold Media Group, L.P.)
- Sister stations: WYCY, WDNB, WWRR

History
- First air date: October 12, 1981

Technical information
- Licensing authority: FCC
- Facility ID: 71346
- Class: A
- ERP: 1,650 watts
- HAAT: 139 meters
- Transmitter coordinates: 41°34′45″N 75°10′42″W

Links
- Public license information: Public file; LMS
- Webcast: Listen live
- Website: WDNH Online

WDNH-FM is a radio station licensed to Honesdale, Pennsylvania, airing an Top 40 format. It airs the Weekly Top 40 with Rick Dees and the Weekend Top 30 with Hollywood Hamilton

On April 3, 2023, WDNH-FM rebranded as "95.3 The Rail".
