= WTRW =

- Carbondale, Pennsylvania; United States
- Broadcast area: Wilkes-Barre–Scranton; Northeastern Pennsylvania
- Frequency: 94.3 MHz
- Branding: 94.3 The Talker

Programming
- Format: Conservative talk
- Affiliations: Fox News Radio

Ownership
- Owner: Bold Gold Media Group, LP

History
- First air date: December 22, 1974
- Former call signs: WCDL-FM (1979–1981); WLSP-FM (1981–1988); WSGD-FM (1988–1998); WCTP (1998–2000); WBHD (2000–2002); WCWI (2002–2004); WNAK-FM (2004–2006); WLNP (2006–2010)
- Call sign meaning: Talk Radio

Technical information
- Licensing authority: FCC
- Facility ID: 58314
- Class: A
- ERP: 970 watts
- HAAT: 249 meters (817 ft)
- Transmitter coordinates: 41°32′37.00″N 75°27′44.00″W

Links
- Public license information: Public file; LMS
- Website: www.bold.gold/943thetalker

WTRW (94.3 FM) is a commercial radio station licensed to Carbondale, Pennsylvania, United States, and serving the Wilkes Barre-Scranton area of Northeastern Pennsylvania. Owned by Bold Gold Media Group, LP, the station carries a conservative talk format known as "94.3 The Talker".

The studios are on North Sekol Road in Scranton. The transmitter is on Salem Mountain Road near Firetower Drive in Waymart.

== History ==
The station signed on the air on December 22, 1974. The original call letters were WCDL-FM. On October 12, 1981, it changed its call sign to WLSP-FM, and on August 5, 1988, to WSGD-FM.

As WSGD-FM, the station broadcast an oldies format under three different names: "Solid Gold 94", "Cool 94", and (after its sale to Citadel Broadcasting) "Big Oldies", which simulcast with Dallas-licensed 93.7 WDLS.

On May 22, 1998, WSGD-FM changed its call sign to WCTP. 93.7 and 94.3 spent the Memorial Day weekend stunting with all Garth Brooks music, before launching as "Cat Country 94" the following Tuesday.

On December 8, 2000, the station changed its call letters to WBHD. The country format ended, and the station began stunting for several days. It was "The Love Channel", broadcasting a continuous loop of phoned-in voices of people seeking dates and relationships. After that, the station began simulcasting Mountain Top-licensed top 40 station WBHT.

On April 19, 2002, the station changed call letters again, this time to WCWI. The WBHT simulcast remained until the fall, when it was then replaced by a relaunched "Cat Country 94". That branding lasted for only a few months before Citadel put the station up for sale and replaced Cat Country 94 with a simulcast of Citadel Allentown-based WCTO ("Cat Country 96").

In the Winter of 2004, the station was sold to Route 81 Radio. On February 10, 2004, the station changed call letters to WNAK-FM and began simulcasting the adult standards format of WNAK in Nanticoke.

On July 5, 2006, the station changed call letters once again, this time to WLNP. The WNAK simulcast gave way to adult contemporary-formatted "Lite 94.3".

On February 1, 2010, Bold Gold Media closed on its purchase of WLNP and began temporarily simulcasting the format of co-owned "The River", WWRR 104.9 FM. On February 19, 2010, WLNP changed call letters to WTRW.

On March 23, 2010, WTRW changed to a conservative talk format, branded as "94.3 FM The Talker". Along with nationally syndicated shows, WTRW featured local morning host David Madeira from May 2012 until December 2015. In 2016, the station began only airing nationally syndicated talk shows, supplied by Premiere Networks, Salem Radio Network, Westwood One and other networks.
