= KZTI =

Radio station in Fallon Station, Nevada

- Fallon Station, Nevada; United States
- Broadcast area: Reno, Nevada
- Frequency: 105.3 MHz
- Branding: Jammin 105.3

Programming
- Format: Rhythmic AC

Ownership
- Owner: Lazer Media; (Lazer Licenses, LLC)
- Sister stations: KNEZ; KSRN; KWNZ

History
- First air date: November 2012; 13 years ago
- Former call signs: KRZQ (2011–2012)
- Call sign meaning: K Z MarTIni (former branding)

Technical information
- Licensing authority: FCC
- Facility ID: 189473
- Class: C
- Power: 100,000 watts
- HAAT: 600 meters (2,000 ft)
- Transmitter coordinates: 39°54′46″N 118°55′18″W
- Repeater: 105.3 KZTI-FM1 (Reno)

Links
- Public license information: Public file; LMS
- Webcast: Listen live
- Website: jamminhits.com

KZTI (105.3 FM, "Jammin 105.3") is a Rhythmic AC formatted broadcast radio station licensed to Fallon Station, Nevada, serving Reno, Nevada. KZTI is owned and operated by Lazer Media.

== History ==
The station, which had flipped from adult standards on September 14, 2015, originally billed itself as "Z-Rock 105.3" until October 9, 2015, when it changed the moniker to "105.3 Rock Hard" as they can not use the "Z-Rock" branding due to Cumulus Media owning the rights to the name (Cumulus also has stations that compete against the Times-Shamrock outlets in Reno). In 2016, it slightly rebranded as "Z105.3 Rock Hard". On August 1, 2017, KZTI changed its format to regional Mexican, branded as "Radio Lazer". (info taken from stationintel.com)

On August 3, 2023, KZTI changed its format from regional Mexican to Spanish rhythmic, branded as "Kalor 105.3".

On August 15, 2024, at Midnight, KZTI flipped to a rhythmic adult contemporary format as "Jammin 105.3"; the first song under the format was "I Can't Wait" by Nu Shooz. Notably, it marks the first English language format operated by Lazer Media, which focuses primarily on Spanish language formats for their stations.

== Booster ==
In addition to the main station, KZTI is relayed by an FM booster to widen its broadcast area.

Call sign	Frequency	City of license	FID	ERP (W)	HAAT	Class	FCC info
KZTI-FM1	105.3 FM	Reno, Nevada	190469	99	131 m (430 ft)	FB/D	LMS
