= KUEZ =

Radio station in Fallon–Reno, Nevada

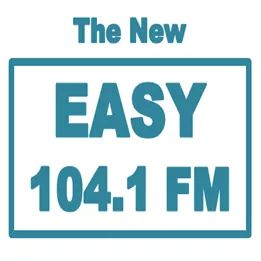
- Fallon, Nevada; United States
- Broadcast area: Reno metropolitan area
- Frequency: 104.1 MHz
- Branding: Easy 104.1

Programming
- Format: Soft adult contemporary

Ownership
- Owner: John Burkavage; (Big Horn Media, Inc.)

History
- First air date: November 12, 2012 (as KRZQ)
- Former call signs: KZZD (CP) (2009–2012); KRZQ (2012–2017)

Technical information
- Licensing authority: FCC
- Facility ID: 165338
- Class: C
- ERP: 100,000 watts
- HAAT: 600 meters (1969 ft)
- Transmitter coordinates: 39°54′46.2″N 118°55′18.9″W
- Repeater: 104.1 KUEZ-FM1 (Reno)

Links
- Public license information: Public file; LMS
- Webcast: Listen live
- Website: easy1041.com

KUEZ (104.1 MHz) is a commercial FM radio station in Fallon, Nevada serving the Reno metropolitan area. It is owned by John Burkavage, with Big Horn Media, Inc. as the licensee. It broadcasts a soft adult contemporary radio format.

KUEZ has an effective radiated power (ERP) of 100,000 watts. The transmitter is in Churchill County off Interstate 80 near the Fallon Rest Stop. KUEZ also has a booster station in Reno on 104.1 MHz, KUEZ-FM1 with an ERP of 17,500 watts.

== History ==
In 2009, Shamrock Communications was granted a construction permit to build a new FM station northeast of Reno and licensed to Fallon. It took three years to get the station on the air.

On November 12, 2012, the station signed on, airing an alternative rock format.

On August 2, 2017, KRZQ was acquired by Big Horn Media from Shamrock Communications. The station changed to Soft Adult Contemporary, branded as Easy 104.1 under the new call sign KUEZ.
