= WFUZ (AM) =

Simulcasts WEZX, Scranton

Wilkes-Barre, Pennsylvania; United States
- Broadcast area: Wilkes-Barre
- Frequency: 1240 kHz
- Branding: Rock 107

Programming
- Format: Classic rock
- Affiliations: United Stations Radio Networks

Ownership
- Owner: Times-Shamrock Communications; (Times Shamrock Media, L.P.)
- Sister stations: WEJL; WEZX/WPZX; WLGD; WQFM/WQFN

History
- First air date: April 29, 1922 (as WBAX)
- Former call signs: WBAX (1922–2018); WQFM (2018–2020)
- Call sign meaning: Fuzz, calls formerly used by WQFM from 2010–2020

Technical information
- Licensing authority: FCC
- Facility ID: 66365
- Class: C
- Power: 1,000 watts unlimited
- Transmitter coordinates: 41°15′13.3″N 75°54′23.7″W
- Translator: 106.9 W295CV (Hazleton)

Links
- Public license information: Public file; LMS
- Webcast: Listen live
- Website: rock107.com

WFUZ (1240 kHz) is an AM radio station in Wilkes-Barre, Pennsylvania. It simulcasts the classic rock radio format of WEZX in Scranton, filling in the gaps in WEZX's signal outside Lackawanna County. It is owned by Times-Shamrock Communications of Scranton.

== History ==
WFUZ is the oldest radio station in northeast Pennsylvania, founded as WBAX on April 29, 1922 by John H. Stenger Jr. WFUZ is also the fifth-oldest station in Pennsylvania. WBAX originally broadcast on a frequency of 833 kHz, the common local broadcast frequency used in 1922. The call letters were randomly assigned from a sequential roster of available call signs. By 1925, the station changed frequency to 1170 kHz. In 1928, WBAX changed frequencies to 1200 kHz, which it shared with Wilkes-Barre's other station, WBRE. The time-sharing arrangement between WBAX and WBRE ceased by 1930 when WBAX moved to 1210 kHz and WBRE moved to 1310 kHz. WBAX stayed at 1210 kHz until the great nationwide frequency reassignment mandated by the Federal government took place in 1941 moving the station to its current dial position of 1240 kHz. WBAX was an affiliate of the Mutual radio network during its early history and for a period of time in the 1970s and 1980s was owned by Merv Griffin Group Radio.

Logo used until 2011

In 1994, the Lynett family of Scranton, publishers of The Scranton Times (now The Times-Tribune), bought WBAX and turned it into a full simulcast of WEJL (630 AM). Although WEJL's daytime signal decently covers Wilkes-Barre, much of the southern part of the market (for instance, Hazleton) gets only a grade B signal due to the area's rugged terrain. At night, WEJL must power down to 32 watts, effectively limiting its nighttime coverage to Lackawanna County.

Logo used until 2021

The station changed its call sign to WQFM on October 1, 2018, then to WFUZ on December 28, 2020.

As of December 2021, WFUZ switched to a simulcast of classic rock-formatted WEZX (106.9 FM).

== See also ==
- List of initial AM-band station grants in the United States
