= WLGD (FM) =

Simulcasting WEZX Scranton

Dallas, Pennsylvania; United States
- Broadcast area: Scranton–Wilkes-Barre; Northeastern Pennsylvania
- Frequency: 107.7 MHz
- Branding: Rock 107

Programming
- Format: Classic rock
- Affiliations: Compass Media Networks

Ownership
- Owner: Times-Shamrock Communications; (Times Shamrock Media, L.P.)
- Sister stations: WEJL; WEZX; WFUZ; WQFM; WQFN

History
- First air date: October 10, 1990 (as WYMK)
- Former call signs: WEMR-FM (1989–1990); WYMK (1990–1995); WEMR-FM (1995–2002); WCWY (2002–2004); WBZR (2004–2006); WGMF (2006–2009); WGMF-FM (2009); WCIG (2009–2021)
- Call sign meaning: "Legends" (previous format)

Technical information
- Licensing authority: FCC
- Facility ID: 19564
- Class: A
- ERP: 2,350 watts
- HAAT: 162 meters (531 ft)
- Transmitter coordinates: 41.3151°N 75.8882°W

Links
- Public license information: Public file; LMS
- Webcast: Listen live
- Website: www.rock107.com

WLGD (107.7 MHz, "Rock 107") is an FM radio station, licensed to Dallas, Pennsylvania, and serving the Scranton–Wilkes-Barre area of Northeastern Pennsylvania. It simulcasts the classic rock format of sister station WEZX (106.9 FM) in Scranton. WLGD and WEZX are owned and operated by Times-Shamrock Communications. The studios and offices are on Baltimore Drive in Wilkes-Barre.

WLGD is a Class A station. It has an effective radiated power (ERP) of 2,350 watts, using a directional antenna. The transmitter is on Deer Path Lane in Kingston Township.

== History ==
=== Classic rock and oldies ===
The station got its construction permit in the mid-1980s after the debut of its original AM sister station, 1460 WEMR (now WGMM). There was no radio station on the air at that time in Wyoming County, until a consortium of local business leaders pooled their resources together to put WEMR on the air. The new company, known as Endless Mountain Broadcasting, Inc., decided to add an FM station. The construction permit was given the call sign WEMR-FM. One of the investors in Endless Mountain Broadcasting was local Chevrolet dealer Don Sherwood, who was also on the local school board for 23 years. He would go on to serve in the United States House of Representatives for eight years.

The station signed on the air on October 10, 1990. By then, the call letters had changed to WYMK. It was staffed by a live, local disc jockeys and subscribed to Unistar's (now Westwood One's) "Adult Rock 'n Roll" classic rock format. It used the moniker "Y-107".

In 1997, Endless Mountain Broadcasting put WEMR and WYMK up for sale. Both stations were purchased by Citadel Broadcasting. Shortly after the purchase, the operations for both stations were moved to Wilkes-Barre from their original home at the WEMR transmitter site on Wilmar Drive in Tunkhannock.

The call letters were changed from WEMR-FM in 2002 to WCWY, and then to WBZR two years later, to WGMF in 2006, and then to WGMF-FM in June 2009. As WGMF-FM, the station was branded as "GEM 107.7" and broadcast an oldies format.

=== Family Life Network ===
WGMF-FM was sold to the Family Life Network, which airs a Christian contemporary format on multiple radio stations in Pennsylvania and New York State. On July 21, 2009, the station started broadcasting its programming. The call sign was changed to WCIG.

=== Bigfoot Legends ===
In 2021, the Family Life Network exchanged WCIG to Seven Mountains Media in exchange for five stations in Elmira and Olean, New York. WCIG changed its call letters to WLGD on June 15, 2021. Ten days later, on June 25, 2021, WLGD dropped Family Life Network programming and began stunting with a loop of "Gone Country" by Alan Jackson. On July 2, 2021, at 10 a.m., WLGD ended stunting and launched a classic country format. It was branded as "Bigfoot Legends 107.7".

On January 19, 2022, WLGD began simulcasting on WARM (590 AM) in Scranton. That included WARM's FM translator, W269CF at 101.7 MHz.

=== Rock 107 simulcast ===
Times-Shamrock Communications agreed to acquire WLGD for $300,000 in May 2024. On May 31, 2024, WLGD changed its format to a simulcast of Times-Shamrock's classic rock-formatted WEZX (Rock 107). Seven Mountains Media retained WARM, and took that station off the air while seeking new programming.
