= WYCY =

- Hawley, Pennsylvania; United States
- Broadcast area: Pocono Lake Region, Pennsylvania
- Frequency: 105.3 MHz
- Branding: Classic Hits 105.3

Programming
- Format: Classic hits
- Affiliations: Citadel Media

Ownership
- Owner: Bold Gold Media Group, L.P.
- Sister stations: WDNH-FM, WPSN

History
- First air date: September 1993

Technical information
- Licensing authority: FCC
- Facility ID: 3675
- Class: A
- ERP: 2,900 watts
- HAAT: 146 meters (479 ft)
- Transmitter coordinates: 41°34′45.00″N 75°10′42.00″W

Links
- Public license information: Public file; LMS
- Webcast: Listen live
- Website: classichits1053.com

WYCY (105.3 FM) is a radio station broadcasting a classic hits music format. Licensed to Hawley, Pennsylvania, United States, the station is currently owned by Bold Gold Media Group, L.P. and features programming from Citadel Media.

== History ==
WYCY began in September 1993 as "Y105 The Best Mix". The station was then owned by Banner Broadcasting and its format was Adult Contemporary. In the mid- to late 1990s, it was sold and became Sunny 105, an oldies station. In early 2010 WYCY changed its name to Classic Hits 105.3, and now features more uptempo rock music. The station broadcasts to the Pocono Lake Region of Wayne and Pike Counties, Pennsylvania. It, along with its sister stations 95-3 DNH (WDNH-FM) and Headline News Radio 104.3 FM & 1590 AM (WPSN), are the heritage stations serving the local communities.
