= WQFM (FM) =

Coordinates: 41.186°N 75.859°W

- Nanticoke, Pennsylvania; United States
- Broadcast area: Scranton–Wilkes-Barre, Pennsylvania
- Frequency: 92.1 MHz
- Branding: 92 Mix FM

Programming
- Language: English
- Format: Classic hits

Ownership
- Owner: Times-Shamrock Communications; (Times Shamrock Media, L.P.)
- Sister stations: WEJL; WEZX; WFUZ; WLGD; WPZX

History
- First air date: October 31, 1973
- Former call signs: WMJW (1973–1988); WEAY (1988–1994); WTZR (1994–1996); WQFM (1996–2010); WFUZ (2010–2020)
- Call sign meaning: Heritage call letters originally used by former Milwaukee sister station WLDB

Technical information
- Licensing authority: FCC
- Facility ID: 66366
- Class: A
- ERP: 660 watts
- HAAT: 303 meters (994 ft)
- Repeater: 106.9 WEZX-HD2 (Scranton)

Links
- Public license information: Public file; LMS
- Webcast: Listen live
- Website: www.listentomix.com

Satellite station
- WQFN
- Forest City, Pennsylvania; United States
- Frequency: 100.1 MHz

Ownership
- Owner: Times-Shamrock Communications; (Times Shamrock Media, L.P.)

History
- First air date: February 2000
- Former call signs: WQFN (1999–2010); WQFM (2010–2013); WEJL-FM (2013–2021)

Technical information
- Facility ID: 87530
- Class: A
- ERP: 6000 watts
- HAAT: 97 meters (318 ft)

Links
- Public license information: Public file; LMS

WQFM (92.1 MHz, "92 Mix FM") is a commercial FM radio station licensed to Nanticoke, Pennsylvania. Owned by Times-Shamrock Communications, it simulcasts a classic hits format with sister station WQFN 100.1 in Forest City. The station's studios are on Penn Avenue in Scranton. The two stations serve the Wilkes-Barre–Scranton area of Northeastern Pennsylvania.

WQFM and WQFN are Class A stations. WQFM has an effective radiated power (ERP) of 660 watts. Its transmitter is on Penobscot Knob in Mountain Top, Pennsylvania. WQFN has an ERP of 6,000 watts. Its transmitter is on Salem Mountain Road, near U.S. Route 6 in Carbondale.

== History ==
=== WMJW, WEAY, WTZR ===
On October 31, 1973, the station signed on the air as WMJW. It was owned by Thunder Broadcasting and carried an automated adult contemporary format. In 1988, it changed its call sign to WEAY and switched again in 1994 to WTZR.

=== WQFM oldies ===
The call letters became WQFM in 1996. It played oldies of the 1960s and 1970s, known as "Oldies 92 and 100", then switched to hot adult contemporary, branded as QFM and later The Q. On June 30, 2008, the station dropped the hot AC format and began playing music exclusively from The Beatles. On July 3, 2008, the station switched back to an oldies format, branded as "Cool 92.1 and 100.1".

In addition, it was the flagship station of the Wilkes-Barre/Scranton Penguins minor league hockey team until 2009. Tom Grace was the play-by-play announcer for the "Baby Pens" for the majority of the franchise's existence prior to the 2007–2008 season, when former local TV weatherman Scott Stuccio replaced him.

=== WFUZ alternative rock ===
On September 16, 2010, WQFM changed its format to alternative rock, branded as FM 92.1 and changed its call letters to WFUZ. It later began simulcasting the sports radio format, including ESPN Radio, from co-owned WEJL. WFUZ returned to alternative rock as Fuzz 92.1 on September 19, 2012. It switched its branding to Alt 92.1 on February 25, 2017.

The station each summer held a small concert at the Toyota Pavilion at Montage Mountain in Scranton, beginning in 2013. It was known as "Fuzz Fest," showcasing local and national bands, especially groups that were looking to break through.

=== Return to WQFM ===
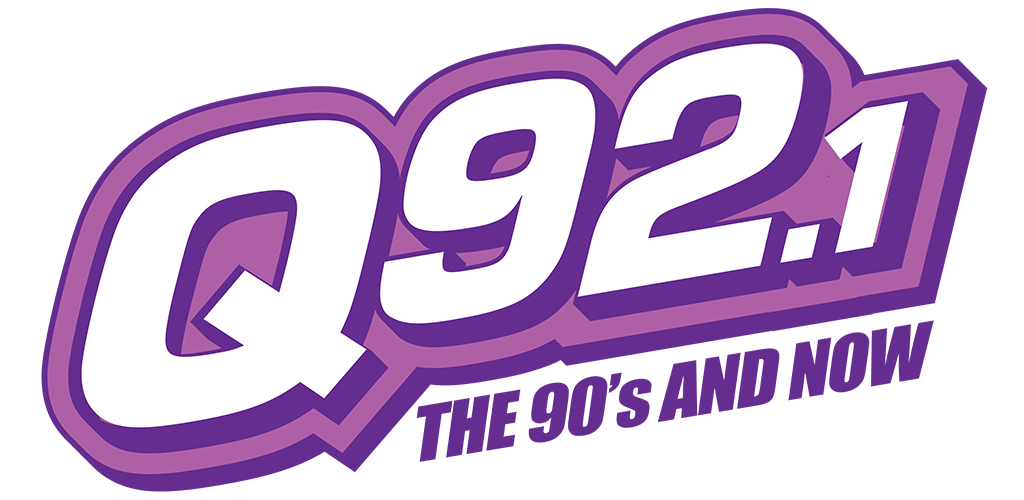
Logo as "Q92.1"

On November 4, 2020, WFUZ dropped its alternative rock format and began playing Christmas music. On December 28, 2020, the station flipped to a 1990s-leaning hot AC format as Q92.1, reinstating the WQFM calls. The format launched by playing nearly their entire new imaging library, then playing exclusively 1990s music for their first hour, starting with "Buddy Holly" by Weezer. On November 15, 2021, co-owned 100.1 WQFN in Forest City ended its simulcast of WEJL and began simulcasting WQFM.

On April 1, 2022, WQFM dismissed its DJs and rebranded as QFM. Additionally, the station dropped its focus on 1990s hits and segued to a straight hot AC format with current hits.

=== Classic hits ===
On August 21, 2024, at 6:00 am, WQFM/WQFN flipped to classic hits as "92 Mix FM".
