= The Scranton Times-Tribune =

Pennsylvania daily newspaper

The Scranton Times-Tribune The Sunday Times
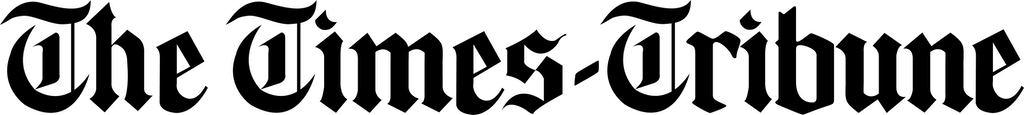
- Type: Daily newspaper
- Format: Broadsheet
- Owner: MediaNews Group
- Publisher: MediaNews Group
- Editor: Larry Holeva
- Founded: Scranton Times: 1870; Scranton Tribune: 1891 (but with heritage dating to 1856); Times-Tribune: 2005
- Language: English
- Headquarters: 149 Penn Ave. Scranton, Pennsylvania 18503; United States
- Circulation: 24,434 (as of September 2022)
- ISSN: 1930-6377
- Website: www.thetimes-tribune.com

The Scranton Times-Tribune is a morning newspaper serving the Scranton, Pennsylvania area. Until August 2023, it was the flagship title of Times-Shamrock Communications and run by three generations of the Lynett-Haggerty family. It is now owned by MediaNews Group, a subsidiary of Alden Global Capital.

On Sundays, the paper is published as The Sunday Times. In the 12 months preceding September 2022, the paper had a daily average circulation of 24,434.

== History ==
The current paper is the result of a 2005 merger between the afternoon Scranton Times and morning Scranton Tribune.

The Times was founded in 1870. It struggled under six owners before E. J. Lynett bought the paper in 1895. Within 20 years, the Times was the dominant newspaper in northeastern Pennsylvania, and the third-largest in the state (behind only the Philadelphia Inquirer and the Pittsburgh Press). In January 1923, Lynett founded one of Scranton's first radio stations, WQAN. The Lynett family still owns the station today under the calls WEJL.

Lynett died in 1943. His three children took control of the paper with William R. Lynett, the oldest, as publisher and editor. He died in 1946; siblings Edward J. and Elizabeth R. Lynett took over as co-publishers, with Edward J. as editor. Edward J. Lynett died in 1966, and his four children took over. Shortly after they took over, the Times expanded to a full week with the appearance of The Sunday Times.

In 1990, the Times bought the remains of its principal rival, the morning Scrantonian-Tribune. This paper had been founded in 1891 as the Scranton Tribune. In 1910, it merged with Scranton's first newspaper, The Morning Republican, and changed its name to the Scranton Republican. After Louis A. Watres and Laurence Hawley Watres sold the Republican in 1934, it became the Scranton Tribune once again in 1936. In 1938, Richard Little, owner of Scranton's Sunday paper, The Scrantonian (founded 1897), teamed up with Morris L. Goodman to buy the Tribune as well. The Goodman-Little family partnership continued for almost half a century, until Richard Little III sold his interest to the Goodmans in 1986. Only a year later, Media One Corporation (no relation to the cable company) bought out the Goodmans and merged the two papers into one seven-day morning paper, The Scrantonian-Tribune. However, Media One was unable to turn the paper around. In 1990, it shuttered the paper. The Lynetts bought the Scrantonian-Tribune nameplate and some other assets, and relaunched the paper as the Scranton Tribune, with much of the same content as the Times (except for timely editing).

By 2004, it was obvious that Scranton could no longer support a morning and afternoon paper, and the Lynetts announced that their two papers would merge into one morning paper, The Times-Tribune. The new paper first rolled off the presses on July 27, 2005. However, its legal name for some years afterward was still The Scranton Times; until the Lynetts sold the paper, the licensee for sister radio station WEJL and its satellites was "The Scranton Times L.P."

In April 2023, the newspaper ceased offering a print edition on Mondays, replacing it with a digital version instead. That August, Times-Shamrock Communications sold the Times-Tribune and three other daily newspapers to MediaNews Group, ending the Lynetts' 128-year ownership. The company's board sold to MediaNews despite opposition from the Lynett family. In a statement, the Lynette said MediaNews' owner, the hedge fund Alden Capital, did not share "the business principles we feel are consistent with the stewardship of any newspaper."

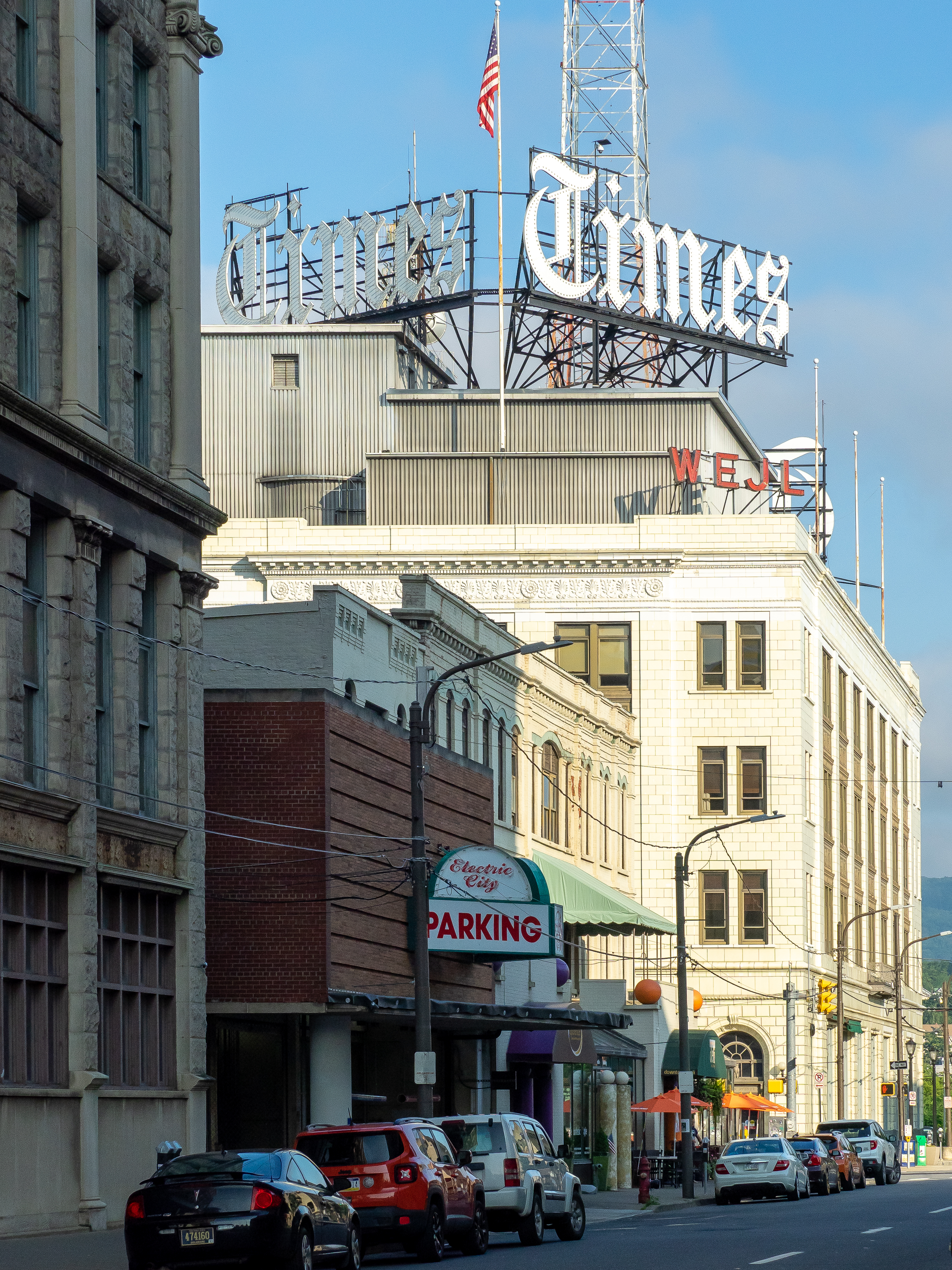
The paper's headquarters in Scranton

== Endorsements ==
The Times endorsed George W. Bush in 2000, but did not endorse anyone in 2004. The Times-Tribune endorsed Barack Obama in 2008 and 2012. The paper endorsed Hillary Clinton in 2016, then native Scrantonian Joe Biden in 2020.

== Awards ==
The Scranton Times won the Pulitzer Prize for Public Service in 1946, while the Scranton Tribune and Scrantonian (then separately owned) won the prize for Local Reporting in 1959.
