= WGMM =

- Tunkhannock, Pennsylvania; United States
- Broadcast area: Scranton/Wilkes-Barre, Pennsylvania
- Frequency: 1460 kHz
- Branding: Gem 99 & 100

Programming
- Format: Classic hits
- Affiliations: Premiere Networks

Ownership
- Owner: Geos Communications
- Sister stations: WGMF-FM; WGMF; WGMA; WAZL

History
- First air date: June 13, 1986 (as WEMR)
- Former call signs: WEMR (1984–2009); WGMF (2009–2018); WZMF (2018–2021)
- Call sign meaning: "Gem"

Technical information
- Licensing authority: FCC
- Facility ID: 19563
- Class: B
- Power: 5,000 watts day; 1,000 watts night
- Transmitter coordinates: 41°33′46.3″N 75°58′9.7″W
- Translators: 93.9 W230DI (Clarks Summit); 100.9 W265EK (Montrose)
- Repeaters: 590 WARM (Scranton); 750 WGMF (Olyphant); 1490 WGMA (Hazleton) 103.9 WGMF-FM (Dushore)

Links
- Public license information: Public file; LMS
- Webcast: Listen live
- Website: www.gem99and100.com

WGMM (1460 AM) is a radio station licensed to the city of Tunkhannock, Pennsylvania and is part of the Scranton/Wilkes-Barre radio market. It broadcasts with 5,000 watts daytime, and 1,000 watts nighttime power with a directional signal. The station simulcasts with WGMF (750 AM) in Olyphant, and WGMF-FM (103.9 FM) in Dushore. The WGMM-WGMF studio is located on Wilmar Drive in Tunkhannock, Pennsylvania. As WEMR, it formerly simulcast the adult contemporary format aired by its sister station, WCOZ, now KZ104, in neighboring Sullivan County, but now airs a classic hits format.

== History ==
WGMM's beginnings trace back to the mid-1980s, when a consortium of eight local businessmen pooled their resources to form Endless Mountain Broadcasting. There was no radio station on the air at that time serving Tunkhannock or Wyoming County, and the rugged mountainous terrain often inhibited weaker radio signals from surrounding markets. One of the owner principals for Endless Mountain Broadcasting was Don Sherwood, a Tunkhannock Chevrolet dealer who would go on to pursue a career in politics, leading him to a congressional seat that he would hold from 1999 to 2007. Sherwood and Norman Werkheiser , founder and president of Keystone Caps, a truck camper top manufacturing company, were the two majority shareholders in the company.

The station was granted approval for a construction permit in November 1984, and made its debut as WEMR in 1986 with a country music format, as well as a live, local real-time airstaff. Off to a good start, Endless Mountain Broadcasting decided to petition the FCC for an FM license. Former sister station, WYMK (now WLGD), made its debut in July 1990, with the help of additional investors with the resources necessary to put the station on the air.

The addition of WYMK into the WEMR portfolio however, did not meet the financial goals expected by Endless Mountain Broadcasting, and both stations were sold in 1997 to Citadel Broadcasting. Operations for both stations were later moved from the WEMR transmitter site on Wilmar Drive in Tunkhannock to Baltimore Drive in Wilkes-Barre, where they occupied space shared with other Citadel-owned stations.

The acquisition of WEMR and WYMK by Citadel did little to reverse its fortunes, with both stations being utilized as little more than simulcast outlets of other Citadel-owned stations. Both stations were sold on May 20, 2003 to its present owner for $515,000.

WEMR returned to the air after a 30 day outage continuing its WCOZ simulcast on August 31, 2007. WEMR changed to a simulcast of its 107.7 sister station programming classic hits in early 2009, and then changed its call sign to WGMF on June 1, 2009. WGMF became a separate standalone facility in August 2009. The then-WZMF, 730 AM, began a simulcast of WGMF, 1460 AM, on May 5, 2010, under an LMA pending its sale. The sale was completed in June 2010.

WGMF and WZMF swapped call signs on July 4, 2018. This station then became WGMM in July 2021 when the call sign became available.

In February 2023 WGMM rebranded as "Gem 99 & 100".

== Translators ==
Broadcast translator for WGMM
Call sign	Frequency	City of license	FID	ERP (W)	HAAT	Class	FCC info
W230DI	93.9 FM	Clarks Summit, Pennsylvania	87048	223	0 m (0 ft)	D	LMS
W265EK	100.9 FM	Tunkhannock, Pennsylvania	202934	250	0 m (0 ft)	D	LMS
