= WGMA (AM) =

Simulcasting WGMM Tunkhannock
- Hazleton, Pennsylvania; United States
- Broadcast area: Scranton/Wilkes-Barre/Hazleton
- Frequency: 1490 kHz
- Branding: Gem 99 & 100

Programming
- Format: Classic hits
- Affiliations: Premiere Networks

Ownership
- Owner: Kevin Fitzgerald and Benjamin Smith; (Geos Communications, LLC)
- Sister stations: WAZL; WGMM; WGMF; WGMF-FM

History
- First air date: December 19, 1932
- Former call signs: WKKA (1932); WAZL (1932–2023)
- Call sign meaning: "Gem"

Technical information
- Licensing authority: FCC
- Facility ID: 132
- Class: C
- Power: 1,000 watts unlimited
- Transmitter coordinates: 40.94066°N 75.965781°W
- Translators: 99.9 W260DV (Wilkes-Barre); 100.1 W261DQ (Hazleton)

Links
- Public license information: Public file; LMS
- Webcast: Listen live
- Website: www.gem99and100.com

WGMA (1490 kHz) is an AM radio station licensed to the city of Hazleton, Pennsylvania with service area extending to the Wilkes-Barre/Scranton radio market. The station broadcasts a classic hits radio format, simulcasting WGMM 1460 AM Tunkhannock. It broadcasts with 1,000 watts of power using a non-directional antenna. WGMA is considered a Class C AM broadcasting station according to the Federal Communications Commission.

== History ==
The radio station has a rich and long broadcast history dating back to 1932 serving the city of Hazleton, Pennsylvania. It originally started broadcasting at a frequency of 1420 kHz as WAZL and had to time share the frequency with WILM in Wilmington, Delaware in 1932. In 1941, a nationwide frequency reassignment took place by the Federal government, which assigned WAZL to 1450 kc. where it stayed until 1948 when the station switched to its current broadcast frequency of 1490 kc. WAZL was an affiliate of the NBC and Mutual radio networks during its early history. From 1932 to 1994, studios were on the seventh floor in the Hazleton National Bank Building at 101 West Broad Street.

The station has struggled in recent years, going silent for a time until Route 81 Radio bought the station and put it back on the air in 2004 as a Full-Service operation serving the local Hazleton community.

In mid-July 2008, Route 81 Radio] fell into financial difficulty and went into foreclosure. WS2K Acquisition, originally a 50% owner in Route 81 Radio, took over the license. Soon afterwards in August 2008, Hazleton Radio, Inc., a locally owned corporation, took over management of the station under a local marketing agreement (LMA). On August 20, 2009, the Hazleton Standard Speaker reported the sale of WAZL to locally owned Panorama Magazine. On April 25, 2011 the FCC approved the sale to WAZL Partners, LLP, switching to the music format to Classic Rock, before finally settling on Hot Adult Contemporary.

In October 2012, WAZL entered into a local marketing agreement with KMCS Broadcasting, LLC, who started stunting Christmas music on November 1, 2012 and then broadcasting an adult hits format on January 1, 2013. This sale fell through in April 2013. In May 2013, Geos Communications began an LMA with WAZL, changed the format to mainstream country, and filed with the FCC to purchase the station. On July 15, 2013, Geos Communications completed its purchase of WAZL, at a price of $30,000. Geos Communications was also the licensee of WGMF/WZMF (Gem 104) in Tunkhannock/Nanticoke, PA. On October 23, 2015, WAZL was sold to J.M.J. Radio, owners of WQOR AM 750 in Olyphant, broadcasting a Catholic religious format.

On December 17, 2015, WAZL switched from a simulcast of classic hits-formatted WGMF 1460 AM to a simulcast of Catholic religious-formatted WQOR 750 AM Olyphant, as a result of a sale to J.M.J. Radio, Inc. The sale took effect on January 4, 2016.

Geos Communications re-acquired WAZL from J.M.J. in February 2023. The purchase, which also included WQOR and translator W261DQ, was consummated on May 31, 2023. The station is now broadcasting both on AM and simulcast on FM 100.1 in a Spanish-language tropical "Hola Radio" format.

On October 13, 2023, WAZL changed its format from Spanish tropical (which moved to WGMF 730 AM Nanticoke) to a simulcast of classic hits-formatted WGMM 1460 AM Tunkhannock, branded as "Gem 99 & 100". On October 22, 2023, the station changed its call sign to WGMA.
