= WGMF-FM =

Simulcasts WGMM, Tunkhannock
- Dushore, Pennsylvania; United States
- Broadcast area: Northern Tier, Pennsylvania
- Frequency: 103.9 MHz
- Branding: Gem 99 & 100

Programming
- Format: Classic hits
- Affiliations: Premiere Networks

Ownership
- Owner: Geos Communications
- Sister stations: WAZL; WGMA; WGMF; WGMM

History
- First air date: 1998 (as WRPA)
- Former call signs: WRPA (1996–2001); WQZI (2001–2003); WCOZ (2003–2008); WNKZ (2008–2016); WDYS (2016–2018)
- Call sign meaning: "Gem"

Technical information
- Licensing authority: FCC
- Facility ID: 66715
- Class: A
- ERP: 2,800 watts
- HAAT: 111 meters (364 ft)
- Transmitter coordinates: 41°30′7.2″N 76°23′32.7″W

Links
- Public license information: Public file; LMS
- Webcast: Listen live
- Website: www.gem99and100.com

WGMF-FM (103.9 MHz, "Gem 99 & 100") is a radio station licensed to serve Dushore, Pennsylvania, United States. The station is owned by Geos Communications. WGMF-FM broadcasts a classic hits music format to the Northern Tier of Pennsylvania, area.

== History ==
WGMF-FM was assigned the WNKZ call letters by the Federal Communications Commission on December 22, 2008. The station changed its call sign to WDYS on March 3, 2016.

New FM booster station, WVYS-FM2, Towanda, Pennsylvania, signed on with 1,200 watts of ERP covering the greater Towanda area on July 31, 2010.

FM translator station, W297BG, Ulster, Athens, Sayre, Pennsylvania, signed on with 235 watts of ERP on 107.3 covering the greater Sayre area on March 20, 2011.

On July 9, 2018, WVYS (and its translator and booster) split from its simulcast with WDYS and switched to a simulcast of country formatted WNBT-FM 104.5 Wellsboro, branded as "Bigfoot Country" under new WZBF calls. The split came following the sale of the three licenses to WNBT-FM owner Seven Mountains Media effective June 29, 2018.

The station changed its call sign to WGMF-FM on July 13, 2018.

In February 2023 WGMF-FM rebranded as "Gem 99 & 100".
