= KNEZ (FM) =

Radio station in Hazen, Nevada

- Hazen, Nevada; United States
- Broadcast area: Reno metropolitan area
- Frequency: 107.3 MHz
- Branding: La Mejor 107.3

Programming
- Format: Classic regional Mexican
- Affiliations: San Francisco Giants Spanish Radio Network

Ownership
- Owner: Lazer Media; (Lazer Licenses, LLC)
- Sister stations: KWNZ, KZTI

History
- First air date: 2009
- Former call signs: KEHD (2009–2012)
- Call sign meaning: "News" (previous format)

Technical information
- Licensing authority: FCC
- Facility ID: 166018
- Class: C
- ERP: 100,000 watts
- HAAT: 600 meters (2,000 ft)
- Transmitter coordinates: 39°54′46″N 118°55′18″W
- Repeater: 107.3 KNEZ-1 (Reno)

Links
- Public license information: Public file; LMS

KNEZ (107.3 FM, "La Mejor 107.3") is a commercial radio station licensed to Hazen, Nevada, United States, and serves the Reno metropolitan area. Owned by Lazer Media, through licensee Lazer Licenses, LLC, it broadcastis a classic regional Mexican format. KNEZ serves as the Reno Spanish-language affiliate for the San Francisco Giants Radio Network.

KNEZ's transmitter is sited north of Interstate 80 in Fallon. Programming is also heard in Reno on booster station KNEZ-1 also at 107.3 MHz.

== History ==
The station signed on the air in 2009. Its original call sign was KEHD. It changed its call letters to KNEZ in 2012 when it began a news/talk format.

On August 1, 2017, KNEZ changed its language from English to Spanish. It began playing Regional Mexican hits, branded as "La Major". It later changed to a Classic Regional Mexican sound, branded as "Radio Lazer."
