= WPSN =

Coordinates: 41.553506°N 75.254685°W

Honesdale, Pennsylvania; United States
- Broadcast area: Scranton (partial)
- Frequency: 1590 kHz
- Branding: Wayne Pike News Radio

Programming
- Format: News/talk
- Affiliations: ABC News Radio

Ownership
- Owner: Bold Gold Media
- Sister stations: WICK, WYCK

Technical information
- Licensing authority: FCC
- Facility ID: 71345
- Class: D
- Power: 2,500 watts day 15 watts night
- Translators: 101.9 W270CC (Hamlin); 102.5 W273DM (Hawley); 104.3 W282BF (Honesdale)

Links
- Public license information: Public file; LMS
- Website: waynepikenews.com

WPSN (1590 AM is a radio station licensed to the city of Honesdale, Pennsylvania and serves a portion of the Scranton radio market (northeast of the city). The station broadcasts with 2,500 watts daytime, 15 watts nighttime with a non-directional signal pattern. It simulcasts on FM translator W282BF Honesdale on 104.3 MHz with 110 watts, on FM translator W273DM Hawley on 102.5 MHz with 250 watts, and on FM translator W270CC Hamlin on 101.9 MHz with 190 watts.

Logo before 102.5 translator sign on

The station is owned by Bold Gold Media. WPSN broadcasts a news/talk format branded as "Wayne Pike News" including programming coming from Premiere Radio Networks's Rush Limbaugh and other talk shows
