= San Antonio Current =

Alternative biweekly newspaper

- Type: Alternative biweekly
- Format: Bi-weekly
- Owner(s): Chava Communications
- Publisher: Michael Wagner
- Editor: Sanford Nowlin
- Founded: 1986
- Headquarters: 117 Mistletoe Ave W. San Antonio, TX 78215; United States
- Circulation: 35,000 (as of 2010)
- OCLC number: 14222766
- Website: sacurrent.com

The San Antonio Current is a free weekly alternative newspaper in San Antonio, Texas. The Current focuses on investigative journalism, political analysis, and critical coverage of local music and culture. It also contains extensive and up-to-date event listings for San Antonio. A member of the Association of Alternative Newsweeklies, its style combines tough journalism with humor. The Current has won many journalism awards, often for coverage of subjects and controversies that are largely ignored by other South Texas media outlets.

The Current carries some nationally syndicated columns, including Savage Love, Free Will Astrology, Jonesin' crosswords, and ¡Ask a Mexican!, in addition to several local columns. The paper also publishes a popular yearly "Best of San Antonio" issue, which invites readers to vote for their favorite food, media, and culture in the San Antonio area. The annual issue employs a Highlander "There can be only one!" deliberation method, meaning that chain restaurants, for example, have to be delineated by location. As of January 2019, the Current has a biweekly circulation of approximately 41,000. It is distributed every Wednesday at more than 1,000 locations citywide.

The Current was founded in 1986 by Linda Matys O'Connell and husband Geoff O'Connell. After having several different owners in the 1990s, the paper was sold in 2000 to Times-Shamrock Communications and then to Euclid Media Group in December 2013. The company dissolved in August 2023 and four of the newspapers were sold to Chava Communications, an entity created by Michael Wagner and his wife, Cassandra Yardeni Wagner.
