= WGMF (AM) =

Simulcasting WGMM Tunkhannock
- Olyphant, Pennsylvania; United States
- Broadcast area: Wilkes-Barre/Scranton
- Frequency: 750 kHz
- Branding: Gem 99 & 100

Programming
- Format: Classic hits
- Affiliations: Premiere Networks

Ownership
- Owner: Kevin Fitzgerald and Benjamin Smith; (Geos Communications, LLC)
- Sister stations: WAZL; WGMA; WGMF-FM; WGMM

History
- First air date: December 23, 1986 (as WRGE)
- Former call signs: WRGE (1984–1987); WWAX (1987–1993); WMXH (1993–1998); WAAT (1998–2003); WQOR (2003–2023)
- Call sign meaning: "Gem"

Technical information
- Licensing authority: FCC
- Facility ID: 8092
- Class: D
- Power: 1,600 watts days only
- Transmitter coordinates: 41°28′34″N 75°29′41″W
- Translator: 98.9 W255BO (Scranton)

Links
- Public license information: Public file; LMS
- Webcast: Listen live
- Website: www.gem99and100.com

WGMF (750 kHz) is a commercial AM radio station licensed to Olyphant, Pennsylvania, and serving the Wilkes-Barre/Scranton radio market. Known as "Gem 99 and 100", it airs a classic hits format and is owned by Kevin Fitzgerald and Benjamin Smith, through licensee Geos Communications, LLC. WGMF is simulcast with co-owned 1460 WGMM in Tunkhannock, 1490 WGMA in Hazleton and 103.9 WGMF-FM in Dushore.

WGMF is a daytimer radio station. By day, it is powered at 1,600 watts using a non-directional antenna. As 750 AM is a clear channel frequency reserved for Class A station WSB in Atlanta, WGMF must go off the air at night to avoid interference. Programming is heard around the clock on multiple FM translators around Northeast Pennsylvania: 93.9 FM in The Abingtons, 98.9 FM in Scranton, 99.9 FM in Wilkes-Barre, 100.1 FM in Hazleton and 100.9 FM in Tunkhannock.

== History ==
=== WRGE and WWAX ===
The station signed on the air on December 24, 1986. Its original call sign was WRGE, owned by Ernke Media Enterprises. It aired a middle of the road format of popular adult music. It was powered at 400 watts, a quarter of its current output.

The call letters changed to WWAX in 1987. James Emmel, a former voice at WGBI, took the reins of WWAX "Live 75". Broadcasting an unusual playlist of songs, WWAX had its home on Lackawanna Avenue in Olyphant.

=== Mixed Up Music ===
In 1993, Carmen Nordone (C.V. Nordone Broadcasting) purchased 750 AM. He changed the call sign to WMXH, using the slogan "Our Music Is All Mixed Up". WMXH operated under a multiple genre format that included Broadway and Hollywood show tunes, classic country, big band music, polka, 1950s and 1960s sock hop oldies and even some Southern Gospel favorites.

Five years later, in 1998, WMXH was purchased by Kevin Fennessy's Fennessy Broadcasting Stations Corporation to become WAAT. It was initially a leased-time ethnic station. In 2001, Fennessy changed format with the addition of the nationally syndicated advice show Dr. Laura with Laura Schlessinger along with the music of Frank Sinatra in the mornings. Earlier in his career, Fennessy had worked at WAAT (1300 AM) in Trenton, New Jersey.

=== Catholic programming ===
The call letters were switched to WQOR on June 17, 2003. It was the third station acquired by Buffalo-based Holy Family Communications, a Roman Catholic non-profit broadcasting organization. WQOR joined The Station of the Cross network. Named for "The Queen of the Rosary", WQOR began broadcasting Catholic programming provided primarily by the EWTN Radio Network. On April 1, 2008, Holy Family Communications sold WQOR to J.M.J. Radio, a Scranton/Wilkes-Barre based non-profit broadcaster.

On December 1, 2010, the Federal Communications Commission issued a Notice of Apparent Liability against J.M.J. Radio, Inc., in the amount of $10,000 for failing to maintain a management and staff presence at the site of WQOR's main studio.

=== Classic hits ===
On February 12, 2023, WQOR announced it would end its Catholic religious shows. The "JMJ" Catholic programming would move to FM translator W283BE (104.5), which had previously been part of the "Gem" network, and the HD4 subchannel of 106.9 WEZX.

Effective May 31, 2023, Geos Communications acquired WQOR, along with sister station WAZL and translator W261DQ, from J.M.J. Radio in exchange for W283BE 104.5 FM. On November 5, 2023, the station changed its call sign to WGMF. The format flipped to classic hits, branded as "Gem 99 & 100". The station simulcasts with several AM stations and a network of FM translators in Northeast Pennsylvania.
