= WAZL (AM) =

- Nanticoke, Pennsylvania; United States
- Broadcast area: Scranton/Wilkes-Barre/Hazleton
- Frequency: 730 kHz
- Branding: Ritmo FM

Programming
- Language: Spanish
- Format: Tropical music

Ownership
- Owner: Geos Communications
- Sister stations: WGMA; WGMF; WGMF-FM; WGMM

History
- First air date: February 1947 (as WHWL)
- Former call signs: WHWL (1947–1958); WNAK (1958–2010); WZMF (2010–2018); WGMF (2018–2023)
- Call sign meaning: "parked" call sign; see WGMA

Technical information
- Licensing authority: FCC
- Facility ID: 59757
- Class: D
- Power: 1,000 watts day; 12 watts night
- Transmitter coordinates: 41°13′10.3″N 75°59′26.7″W
- Translator: See § Translators

Links
- Public license information: Public file; LMS
- Website: ritmo.fm

WAZL (730 kHz) is an AM radio station licensed to the city of Nanticoke, Pennsylvania, and serves the Wilkes-Barre, Scranton, and Hazleton radio markets with a tropical music format, switching from adult standards and Tropical and Spanish language adult contemporary and classic hits formats in October 2023.

WAZL broadcasts on a frequency of 730 kHz with 1,000 watts of power during the daytime with a non-directional antenna. During the nighttime hours, the station must reduce its power to 12 watts. The power reduction at nighttime is required by rules set by the Federal Communications Commission in order to avoid interference from CKAC, a Canadian Class A radio station also on 730 kHz. WAZL also broadcasts at a frequency of 94.9 MHz with 250 watts of power from a site atop Bald Mtn near Keyser Valley/Scranton, Pennsylvania, which covers Scranton, Old Forge, Avoca, Dickson City, Pittston, and Jessup, Pennsylvania. WAZL also broadcasts at a frequency of 95.3 MHz with 99 watts of power from a site atop Penobscot Mountain near Mountain Top, Pennsylvania, which covers Wilkes-Barre, Mountain Top, Wyoming, Nanticoke, Dallas, West Pittston, and Kingston, Pennsylvania. WAZL also broadcasts at a frequency of 99.5 MHz with 55 watts of power from a site in Hazleton Heights PA atop the 1490 tower near Hazleton, Pennsylvania, which covers Hazleton, Freeland, Drums, West Hazleton, and Conyngham, Pennsylvania.

== History ==
The radio station has its origins as WHWL, the last three letters standing for the initials of Henry W. Lark, the station's former owner. The station then changed hands and was owned by Radio Anthracite, Inc. with the call sign changing along the way to WNAK. The station changed ownership in 1958 to Attorney Martin Phillips and Wyoming Radio, Inc. In 1965, Bob Neilson, Charmaine Grove, and accountant Harold Detwiler (to be known collectively as Seven-Thirty Broadcasters, Inc.) purchased radio station WNAK from Attorney Martin Phillips and Wyoming Radio, Inc. During the 1980s, WNAK started broadcasting with the Kahn-Hazeltine AM stereo system, the only northeastern Pennsylvania AM broadcasting station to use the system.

In 2003, Seven-Thirty Broadcasters and WNAK were acquired by Route 81 Radio, based in West Chester, PA. From 2004 until 2006, WNAK was simulcast on the former WNAK-FM located in Carbondale, Pennsylvania at 94.3 MHz. WNAK-FM is now known as "94.3 FM The Talker" and broadcasts a talk format with the call sign WTRW. In 2005, WNAK was honored by the National Association of Broadcasters as the adult standards format station of the year in Pennsylvania. The station switched from an adult standards format on October 15, 2007, to Spanish language programming simulcasting sister station WCDL, "Caliente (Hot) 1440", from Carbondale, Pennsylvania.

The station's programming as "Caliente" was a mix of locally produced shows from 7 a.m. to 5 p.m. weekdays followed by syndicated shows from Bustos Broadcasting.

It was announced in early December 2008 that WNAK, along with sister station WCDL, would be returning to a standards format. Newspaper ads have used the slogan "The Greatest Music of All Time" and have featured photos of singers such as Frank Sinatra, Tony Bennett, Dean Martin and Peggy Lee. The station changed its call sign to WZMF on April 23, 2010. WZMF switched to a simulcast of the-then 1460 kHz WGMF on May 5, 2010, airing a classic hits/oldies format. On July 4, 2018, WZMF and WGMF swapped call signs.

In February 2023, WGMF rebranded as "Gem 99 & 100".

On October 13, 2023, WGMF dropped its simulcast with WGMM, added translators W235DC and W237DP, and launched a Spanish tropical music format, branded as "Hola Radio". The station changed its call sign to WAZL on October 29, 2023. On November 14, 2023, WAZL rebranded as "Ritmo FM"

== Translators ==
Broadcast translators for WAZL
Call sign	Frequency	City of license	FID	ERP (W)	HAAT	Class	FCC info
W235DC	94.9 FM	Dickson City, Pennsylvania	157890	250	222.7 m (731 ft)	D	LMS
W237DP	95.3 FM	Mountain Top, Pennsylvania	145747	99	0 m (0 ft)	D	LMS
W258DJ	99.5 FM	Hazleton, Pennsylvania	201543	55	148 m (486 ft)	D	LMS

== Previous logo ==
(WGMF's logo under former "Gem 104" branding)
