= WDNB =

- Jeffersonville, New York; United States
- Broadcast area: Monticello-Liberty-Catskills
- Frequency: 102.1 MHz
- Branding: Thunder 102 & 104.5

Programming
- Format: Country

Ownership
- Owner: Bold Gold Media Group, L.P.

History
- First air date: November 15, 1999 (as WWHW)
- Former call signs: WWHW (1998–2000)

Technical information
- Licensing authority: FCC
- Facility ID: 72626
- Class: A
- ERP: 6,000 watts
- HAAT: 77 meters (253 ft)
- Transmitter coordinates: 41°44′30.3″N 74°51′21.5″W
- Repeater: 104.5 WHNB (Hancock)

Links
- Public license information: Public file; LMS
- Website: www.boldgoldnewyork.com

WDNB (102.1 FM) is a radio station broadcasting a country music format. Licensed to Jeffersonville, New York, United States. The station is owned by Bold Gold Media Group, L.P. WDNB is simulcast on WHNB (104.5 FM) in Hancock.

== History ==
The station was assigned the call sign WWHW on August 21, 1998. On February 10, 2000, the station changed its call sign to the current WDNB.
