= Adelitas Way discography =

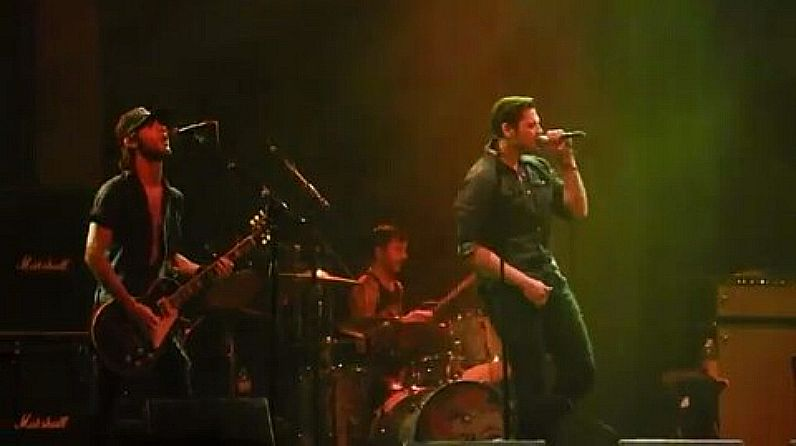
- Adelitas Way in 2014
- Studio albums: 7
- Extended plays: 3
- Singles: 45
- Music videos: 15

The discography of Adelitas Way, an American hard rock band, consists of seven studio albums, three extended plays, 15 music videos, and 45 singles.

== Albums ==
=== Studio albums ===
Year	Album details	Peak chart positions				
Year	Album details	US	US Alt.	US Heat.	US Hard Rock	US Rock
2009	Adelitas Way: Released: July 14, 2009; Label: Virgin; Formats: CD, DI	—	—	15	—	—
2011	Home School Valedictorian: Released: June 7, 2011; Label: Virgin; Formats: CD, DI	66	16	—	4	20
2014	Stuck: Released: July 29, 2014; Label: Virgin; Formats: CD, DI, LP	30	6	—	2	9
2016	Getaway: Released: February 26, 2016; Label: The Vegas Syn/The Fuel Music; Formats: CD, DI, LP	—	18	—	8	25
2017	Notorious: Release: October 20, 2017; Label: The Vegas Syn/The Fuel Music; Formats: CD, DI, LP	—	—	—	—	—
2020	Shine On: Release: August 14, 2020; Label: The Vegas Syn/The Fuel Music; Formats: CD, DI, LP	—	—	—	—	—
2023	Power: Release: September 16, 2023; Label: The Vegas Syn	—	—	—	—	—

=== Extended plays ===
Year	Album details
2015	Deserve This EP: Released: 2015
2018	Live Love Life: Released: 2018
2021	Rivals: Released: 2021
2025	Deja Vu: Released: 2025

== Singles ==
Year	Song	Peak chart positions					Album
Year	Song	US Alt	US MSR	US Rock	US Airplay	Active Rock	Album
2009	"Invincible"	—	6	25	—	4	Adelitas Way
2010	"Last Stand"	—	29	—	—	23	Adelitas Way
2011	"Sick"	29	2	11	—	1	Home School Valedictorian
2011	"The Collapse"	33	3	16	—	2	Home School Valedictorian
2012	"Criticize"	—	1	17	—	1	Home School Valedictorian
2012	"Alive"	—	6	—	26	4	Home School Valedictorian
2012	"Somebody Wishes They Were You"	—	—	—	—	—	Home School Valedictorian
2014	"Dog on a Leash"	—	7	—	44	7	Stuck
2014	"Save the World"	—	40	—	—	36	Stuck
2015	"Something More"	—	—	—	—	—	Stuck
2015	"I Get Around"	—	—	—	—	—	Getaway
2015	"Bad Reputation"	—	13	—	—	13	Getaway
2016	"Good Die Young"	—	—	—	—	—	Getaway
2016	"Ready for War (Pray for Peace)"	—	21	—	—	21	Notorious
2016	"Tell Me"	—	—	—	—	—	Notorious
2017	"Notorious"	—	33	—	—	32	Notorious
2017	"This Goes Out to You"	—	—	—	—	—	Notorious
2017	"Vibes"	—	—	—	—	—	Notorious
2018	"Still Hungry"	—	—	—	—	39	Live, Love, Life
2018	"Drifting"	—	—	—	—	—	Live, Love, Life
2018	"Black Diamond"	—	—	—	—	—	Live, Love, Life
2019	"What It Takes"	—	—	—	—	—	Shine On
2019	"Down for Anything"	—	—	—	—	—	Shine On
2019	"Stay Ready"	—	—	—	—	—	Shine On
2020	"Habit"	—	—	—	—	—	Shine On
2020	"Shine On"	—	40	—	—	—	Shine On
2020	"Heartbreak"	—	—	—	—	—	Shine On
2021	"Own It" (with New Medicine)	—	—	—	—	—	Rivals
2021	"I Will Not Be Stopped"	—	—	—	—	—	Rivals
2021	"Good Vs Evil"	—	—	—	—	—	Non-album single
2021	"Got It Good"	—	—	—	—	—	Rivals
2021	"Ghost"	—	—	—	—	—	Rivals
2022	"Up" (with New Medicine)	—	—	—	—	—	Power
2022	"New Era"	—	—	—	—	—	Power
2022	"Pushing My Limits"	—	—	—	—	—	Power
2022	"In Your Eyes"	—	—	—	—	—	Power
2023	"Talk"	—	—	—	—	—	Power
2023	"Down"	—	—	—	—	—	Power
2023	"Fly"	—	—	—	—	—	Power
2023	"Snake In the Grass"	—	—	—	—	—	Power
2023	"One Way to Find Out"	—	—	—	—	—	Power
2023	"War of Change" (with Thousand Foot Krutch)	—	—	—	—	—	The End Is Where We Begin: Reignited
2023	"Dig Deep" (with New Medicine)	—	—	—	—	—	Non-album single
2024	"Nights Like This"	—	—	—	—	—	Non-album single
2024	"Other Side"	—	—	—	—	—	Non-album single
2024	"The Fire Inside"	—	—	—	—	—	Non-album single
2024	"Through You" (with Art of Dying)	—	—	—	—	—	Won't Look Back
2024	"Speak My Mind"	—	—	—	—	—	Non-album single
2026	"Underdog (with Citizen Soldier and New Medicine)	×	×	×	×	×	Non-album single

== Promotional singles ==
Year	Single	Album
2009	"Scream"	Adelitas Way
2011	"I Can Tell"	Home School Valedictorian
2011	"Move"	Home School Valedictorian
2011	"Hurt"	Home School Valedictorian
2014	"Stuck"	Stuck
2014	"A Different Kind of Animal"	Stuck
2014	"Drive"	Stuck
2015	"Deserve This"	Deserve This (EP)/Getaway
2015	"Harbor the Fugitive"	Deserve This (EP)/Getaway
2016	"Getaway"	Getaway
2016	"Unbroken"	non-album single
2018	"Can't Say Goodbye"	Live, Love, Life
2018	"Like a Disease"	Live, Love, Life
2019	"The Way You Look Tonight"	non-album single
2020	"All In"	Shine On

== Music videos ==
Year	Song	Director
2009	"Invincible"	Dale Resteghini
2010	"Last Stand"	Paul Boyd
2011	"Sick"	Michael Maxxis
2011	"The Collapse"	Possum Hills
2012	"Alive"	Gavin Bowden
2014	"Dog on a Leash"	Agata Alexander
2014	"Save the World"	Possum Hills
2017	"Notorious"	Mason Wright
2019	"What It Takes"	Mason Wright
2020	"Shine On"	Vicente Cordero
2021	"Own It"	Mason Wright
2021	"Good vs. Evil"	BlvckBox Studios
2022	"Up"	Mason Wright & DC24Frames
2023	"Snake In the Grass"	Unknown
2023	"Dig Deep"	Unknown
2024	"The Fire Inside"	Unknown
