= I Get Around (disambiguation) =

"I Get Around" is a 1964 single by The Beach Boys.

"I Get Around" can also refer to:

- "I Get Around" (Tupac Shakur song), 1993
- "I Get Around" (Dragonette song), 2007
- "I Get Around" (Adelitas Way song), 2015
