= Getaway =

Getaway or Get Away may refer to:

- Crime scene getaway, the act of fleeing the location of a crime scene
- A short vacation or holiday, a leave of absence or a trip for recreation
- Getaway (TV series), an Australian travel television series
- Getaway (The Saint), a 1932 mystery novel by Leslie Charteris
- "Get Away", an episode of the sitcom The King of Queens
- Getaway! (video game), a 1982 crime-themed scrolling maze game for Atari 8-bit computers
- Norwegian Getaway, a 2013 cruise ship

== Film ==
- The Getaway (1972 film), an American action thriller directed by Sam Peckinpah and starring Steve McQueen
- The Getaway (1994 film), an American action thriller starring Alec Baldwin and Kim Basinger
- Getaway (2013 film), an American action thriller starring Ethan Hawke and Selena Gomez
- Get Away (film), a 2024 British horror comedy starring Nick Frost

== Music ==
=== Albums ===
- The Getaway (Chris de Burgh album), 1982
- Getaway (The Clean album), 2001
- Getaway (Reef album), 2000
- Getaway (Adelitas Way album), 2016
- Getaway, a 2017 album by the Hunter Brothers
- Get Away, a 1967 album by Georgie Fame
- Getaway - Groups & Sessions, an album by Ritchie Blackmore

=== Songs ===
- "Get Away" (Bobby Brown song), 1993
- "Getaway" (Earth, Wind & Fire song), 1976
- "Get Away" (Georgie Fame song), 1966
- "Get Away" (Mobb Deep song), 2001
- "Get Away" (Rottyful Sky song), 2013
- "Getaway" (Texas song), 2005
- "Getaway" (Vincint song), 2021
- "And Get Away", by The Esquires
- "The Getaway" (Hilary Duff song), by Hilary Duff
- "Get Away", by OsamaSon from Psykotic
- "Get Away", by Badfinger from Ass
- "Get Away", by Big K.R.I.T. from 4eva Is a Mighty Long Time
- "Getaway", by Blossoms from their self-titled album
- "Get Away", by Brian McFadden from Set in Stone
- "Get Away", by Chicago, as a part of the album version from "Hard to Say I'm Sorry"
- "Get Away", by Chris Bell from I Am the Cosmos
- "Get Away", by Christina Milian from the self-titled album
- "Get Away", by CHVRCHES
- "Get Away", by CNBLUE from Code Name Blue
- "Getaway", by Dev from The Night the Sun Came Up
- "Get Away", by Dr. Dog from Be the Void
- "Get Away", the 2002 debut single by Earshot from Letting Go
- "Get Away", by Fitz and the Tantrums by More Than Just a Dream
- "The Getaway", by Immortal Technique from Revolutionary Vol. 1
- "Get Away", by King's X from Ogre Tones
- "Getaway", by Kiss from Dressed to Kill
- "Get Away", by Loudness from Thunder in the East
- "Getaway", by Michelle Branch
- "Get Away", by Mitchel Musso from Brainstorm EP
- "Getaway", by Monica from The Makings of Me
- "Getaway", by The Music from the self-titled album
- "Getaway", by NCT 127 from Blingy
- "Getaway", by Pearl Jam from Lightning Bolt
- "Getaway", by Stereophonics from You Gotta Go There to Come Back
- "Getaway", by Train from their 2001 album Drops of Jupiter
- "Getaway", by Tritonal featuring Angel Taylor from Painting With Dreams
- "Get Away", by Westlife, B-side of the single "Us Against the World"
- "Get Away", by Yelawolf from Radioactive
- "Get Away", by Yuck from their 2011 eponymous album
- "Getaway", by Saint Motel from saintmotelevision

== See also ==
- The Getaway (disambiguation)
