= Broski =

Broski may refer to:

- Brittany Broski (born 1997), American comedic social media personality
- Robert Broski (born 1952), American actor
- Just Take Care, Spike Your Hair (The Broski of the Week Song)
