= Matt Cardona =

American professional wrestler (born 1985)

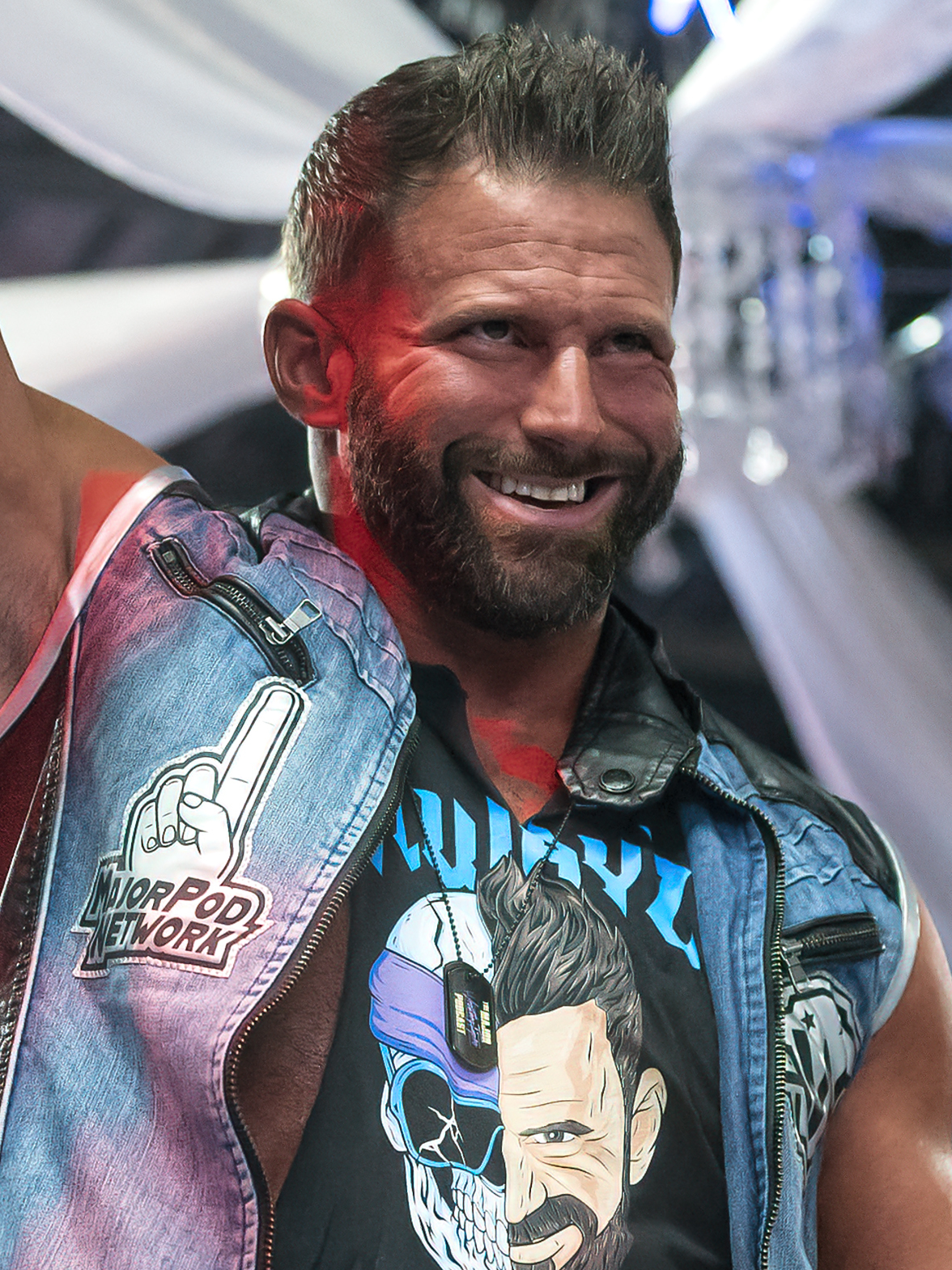
- Cardona in 2022

Personal information
- Born: Matthew Brett Cardona; May 14, 1985 (age 41) Merrick, New York, U.S.
- Spouse: Chelsea Green (m. 2021)
- Website: mattcardona.com

Professional wrestling career
- Ring names: Brett Major; Brett Majors; Brett Matthews; Matt Cardona; Zack Ryder
- Billed height: 6 ft 2 in (188 cm)
- Billed weight: 230 lb (104 kg)
- Billed from: Long Island, New York
- Trained by: Mikey Whipwreck
- Debut: August 14, 2004

Matthew Brett Cardona (born May 14, 1985) is an American professional wrestler and actor. He is signed to WWE, where he performs on the SmackDown brand under his real name. He previously performed in WWE from 2006 to 2020 under the ring name Zack Ryder. He also known for his tenures in Total Nonstop Action Wrestling (TNA) and the independent circuit.

Cardona debuted in professional wrestling in 2004, teaming with Brian Myers on the independent circuit. Both men were signed by WWE the following year, making their main roster debuts in 2007. After the team split in 2009, he made appearances on WWE's ECW brand until 2010, following which he was featured sparingly on television. In 2011, he launched a YouTube web series in which he proclaimed himself WWE's "Internet Champion"; this, along with his creative use of social media, helped him establish a substantial cult following. Over the course of his time with WWE, Cardona held the Intercontinental, United States, and (Raw) Tag Team Championships (the latter with Hawkins on two occasions).

After being released by WWE in April 2020, Cardona has made appearances in major wrestling promotions including All Elite Wrestling (AEW), Impact Wrestling, and the National Wrestling Alliance (NWA), as well as throughout the American independent circuit, most notably in Game Changer Wrestling (GCW). He has since won various championships including the NWA World's Heavyweight Championship, Impact Digital Media Championship, and GCW World Championship. During this time he received critical praise, being named Indie Wrestler of the Year in 2022 and in 2023 by Pro Wrestling Illustrated. He returned to WWE in October 2025 and re-signed with the promotion in January 2026.

== Early life ==
Matthew Brett Cardona was born in Merrick, New York, on May 14, 1985 with Italian ancestry. While in high school, he overcame synovial sarcoma, which had started in his foot and spread to his lungs. He was forced to miss a year of school.

== Professional wrestling career ==
=== New York Wrestling Connection (2004–2006) ===
Cardona was trained by Mikey Whipwreck. He debuted with New York Wrestling Connection (NYWC) in 2004, using the name Brett Matthews. He began regularly teaming with Brian Myers and the duo of Myers and Matthews went on to defeat the NYWC Tag Team Champions Dickie Rodz and Mason Raige by disqualification, for which titles do not change hands. On the next event on June 4, they won a rematch decisively to become the NYWC Tag Team Champions. Later that month, they were attacked by The Dead Presidents (Lo Lincoln and Boog Washington) to set up a feud where they eventually lost their titles against them on August 27. On September 23, they were entered into a three-way match with then champions, but Team Tremendous (Dan Barry and Ken Scampi) ended up with the championship. After continuing to win matches, they re-earned a match against Team Tremendous and won the titles for the second time on January 25, 2006. They held the championship until they faced the B.S. Xpress (Tony Burma and Mike Spinelli), who defeated them for the titles on March 26.

=== WWE (2005–2020) ===
==== Developmental territories (2005–2007) ====
Cardona's first WWE appearance was on April 21, 2005, on SmackDown!, where he lost to Matt Morgan. On February 24, 2006, Cardona signed a developmental contract with World Wrestling Entertainment (WWE). In Deep South Wrestling (DSW), he was renamed Brett Major while Myers was renamed Brian Major. On October 12, they won the DSW Tag Team Championship from The Untouchables (Deuce Shade and Dice Domino) and held them until the end of November, losing them to Urban Assault (Eric Pérez and Sonny Siaki). After the titles were vacated in the following year, they became two-time champions defeating the new team of Sonny Siaki and Afa Jr (The Samoan Swat Team) and The Blue Bloods (William Regal and Dave Taylor). Later in 2007 they moved to Ohio Valley Wrestling (OVW) and won the OVW Southern Tag Team Championship once, reigning from June 15 to 29.

In March 2015, Devon Nicholson described an incident from 2006 that Bill DeMott was involved with while he was head trainer for the WWE's DSW developmental territory. Nicholson described an incident where Drew Hankinson was completely naked in the ring for a long period of time and gave naked stink faces to Cardona and Melissa Coates while DeMott held jelly donuts over their faces. The wrestlers agreed to do this (with the other talent encouraging them) to get out of regular training for that day. DeMott refuted the notion that it was his idea, stating that the other trainees came up with because they wanted to skip the session.

==== La Familia (2007–2009) ====
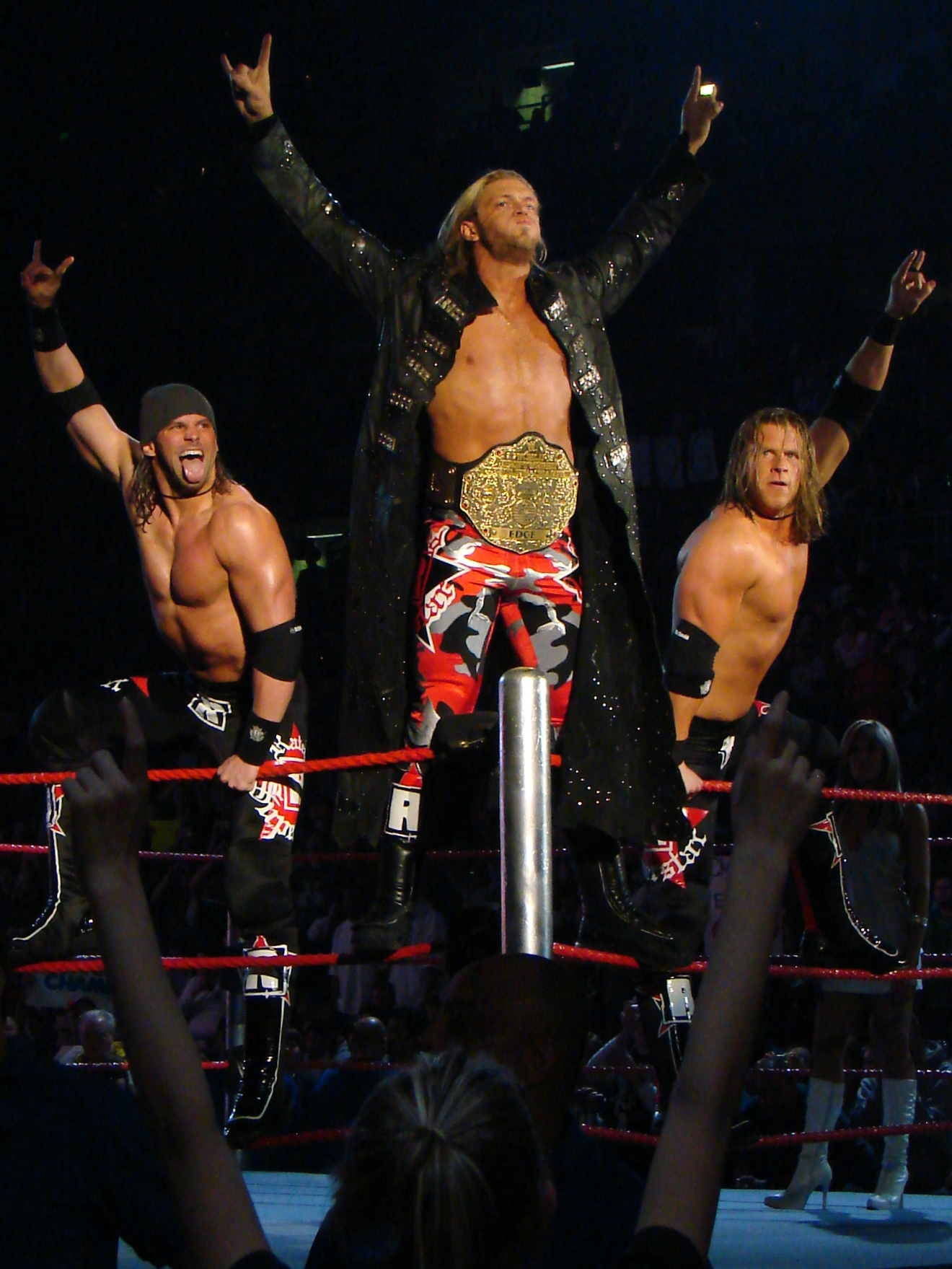
In 2007, The Major brothers allied with Edge (center) and changed their names to Curt Hawkins and Zack Ryder

The team was moved to the main roster in May 2007. They worked on WWE's ECW brand, winning only their first match until they were drafted to SmackDown! in June. On November 9 they won a battle royal to receive a WWE Tag Team Championship match, but didn't win.

At Armageddon, the duo dressed up like Edge and interfered in the World Heavyweight Championship match, replacing Edge at several points along the match to help him win the title and thus turning heel for the first time in their WWE career. On December 21, the Major Brothers were revealed as an acquaintance to Edge and his lover, SmackDown General Manager Vickie Guerrero. The Major Brothers were repackaged and renamed, with Cardona and Myers being renamed Zack Ryder and Curt Hawkins respectively. Occasionally referred to as the Rated-R Entourage by commentators Michael Cole and John "Bradshaw" Layfield, the group allied with Guerrero's nephew, Chavo Guerrero and his enforcer Bam Neely as the group La Familia, which dominated SmackDown's storyline through 2008. Ryder and Hawkins interfered in Edge's match at WrestleMania XXIV against The Undertaker, but Undertaker eventually won the match.

At The Great American Bash on July 20, Curt Hawkins (the former Bryan Major) and Ryder won the WWE Tag Team Championship from John Morrison and the Miz in a fatal four-way match which also featured Jesse and Festus and Finlay and Hornswoggle after Hawkins pinned Jesse. Their victory meant that they were the youngest team to hold the championships. By SummerSlam in August, La Familia had begun to fracture and Ryder, with Hawkins, went back to appearing on their own. On the September 26 airing of SmackDown, Hawkins and Ryder lost the titles to The Colóns (Carlito and Primo) in their first televised title defense. On April 15, 2009, Ryder was drafted back to the ECW brand as part of the 2009 supplemental draft, separating the team.

==== Long Island Loudmouth (2009–2011) ====
Ryder made his return to ECW on May 5, 2009, in a backstage segment with General Manager Tiffany. He now sported short spiky hair, tanned skin, sunglasses, a headband, half-trunks/half-tights, displaying something of an arrogant Long Island guido character and more frequent uses of catchphrases "woo woo woo" and "you know it", that he had used sparingly in the tag team. He lost to Finlay in his first singles match, on the May 7 episode of Superstars. His first win was on the May 19 ECW on Sci Fi over a jobber, in what is now known as the "exploding trunks" match due to the jobber suffering a wardrobe malfunction during the match. On September 15, Ryder won a 10-man battle royal to earn contendership to the ECW Championship but lost to the champion, Christian, the following week. On the November 3 episode of ECW, Ryder entered a love angle with Rosa Mendes who became his valet. He also feuded with Tommy Dreamer, culminating in a match on December 29 where Ryder won to force Dreamer to leave the company.

"It was way before The Jersey Shore. I was with Curt Hawkins as the Edge Heads—a long haired blonde kid. And I needed a change. I needed something different. So I just took my real personality, turned the volume way up, cut the hair, went to all the clubs on Long Island, like GLO, and fist pumped with all my broskies until I finally found who I really was, and portrayed it to the world, throwing up the 'LI' hand signal".

— Ryder on his new character after he stopped teaming with Hawkins.

When the ECW brand came to an end in February 2010, Ryder and Mendes moved to the Raw brand, making his debut on the February 25 episode of Superstars, defeating Primo. Ryder made his Raw debut on March 1, losing to MVP in a Money in the Bank qualifying match. He participated in an untelevised 26-man battle royal at WrestleMania XXVI, being the last person eliminated by the winner Yoshi Tatsu. Mendes was drafted to SmackDown as part of the 2010 Supplemental Draft without Ryder, so Ryder sought a new valet, trying to impress Alicia Fox and Gail Kim while they watched his matches at ringside. During a match with Evan Bourne on the May 10 episode of Raw, Fox attempted to interfere on Ryder's behalf but was stopped by Kim, leading to Bourne winning the match. The two new pairings faced off in a mixed tag team match on the May 17 episode of Raw, which Ryder and Fox lost. Ryder had a return win over Bourne on May 27's Superstars. The next week on Raw, Fox attacked Ryder with an axe kick after Raw guest host Ashton Kutcher put a bounty on Ryder's head. During the June 7 Viewer's Choice episode of Raw, Ryder was voted to team with The Miz, defeating John Morrison and R-Truth. The next week, Ryder had a title shot in a fatal four-way match for the United States Championship, but lost. Months later, in August, he was given a WWE Championship match against Sheamus that lasted 11 seconds, which was the second-shortest WWE Championship match in WWE history, in an attempt by Sheamus to circumvent the company's 30 day championship defence policy.

During this time, Ryder became a mentor on the second season of NXT to Titus O'Neil. They debuted in a losing effort against John Morrison and Eli Cottonwood; O'Neil was the first rookie eliminated from the second season, on June 29. On the July 27 episode of NXT, Ryder, now sporting normal trunks, lost against Percy Watson, making him the first mentor of season 2 to lose to a rookie in a singles match. For the remainder of the year and well into 2011, Ryder mostly became used on the non-branded Superstars show, occasionally teaming with Primo, and has since dropped his half-trunks/half-tights gear and began wearing normal trunks. Ryder won a 2010 Slammy Award for Most Annoying Catchphrase in December.

==== Rise of the Ryder Revolution (2011–2012) ====
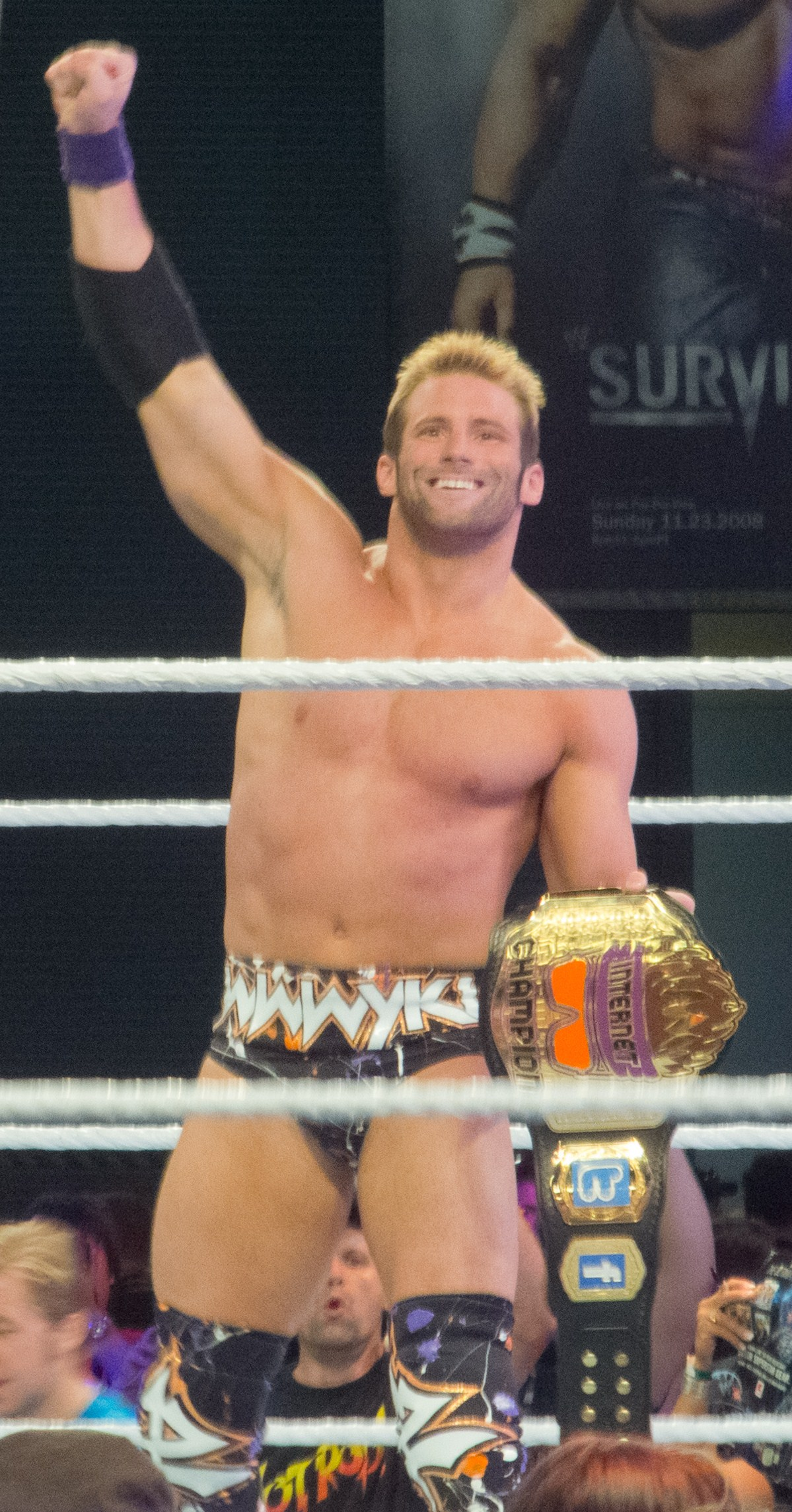
Ryder with his self-proclaimed WWE Internet Championship

As a result of being underutilised on television, Ryder became dissatisfied with his place in WWE and he started a YouTube web series called Z! True Long Island Story in February 2011 to promote his character. The web series soon earned Ryder a dedicated fan following: his T-shirts sold out despite not appearing on television and by June, "We Want Ryder" chants were started by the audiences of Raw and the Capitol Punishment pay-per-view without Ryder appearing on the show.

The web show's popularity led to Ryder having a rise in status, making more appearances on television. Between April and June, Ryder appeared during Raw more often, often in backstage segments with John Cena. On the July 29 episode of SmackDown, Ryder was appointed as the assistant to SmackDown General Manager Theodore Long, allowing him to make television appearances on both Raw and SmackDown.

On the September 19 episode of Raw SuperShow, Ryder won a non-title match against United States Champion Dolph Ziggler with the help of guest star Hugh Jackman who punched Ziggler mid-match. Following his victory over Ziggler, Ryder received a match for the United States Championship the following week and again at Vengeance, but both unsuccessful due to interference from Jack Swagger. Ryder main evented Raw SuperShow for the first time on November 7, teaming with John Cena in a losing effort against The Miz and R-Truth. At Survivor Series later in November, with Ryder not wrestling on the card, there were multiple "We Want Ryder" chants, including during the United States Championship match and during The Rock's show-closing speech.

On the December 5 episode of Raw SuperShow, Ryder lost a match to Cena and a chance for a WWE Championship shot, but Cena surrendered his WWE Championship match so Ryder could have a second chance, but for the United States Championship. This second chance was a no disqualification match against then World Heavyweight Champion Mark Henry, which Ryder won with interference from Cena, thus earning him a United States Championship match at TLC: Tables, Ladders and Chairs, which Ryder won over Dolph Ziggler to capture his first ever singles title. Shortly after, Ryder left his position as assistant to the SmackDown General Manager due to his championship commitments.

==== Return to lower-tier status (2012–2015) ====
2012 turned out to be less of a success for Ryder than 2011. The Baltimore Sun wrote, "The 2011 calendar year was a dream for Ryder... But 2012 was a nightmare..." Seemingly all the glory of his YouTube hit fizzled... After WrestleMania, he was rarely seen on WWE TV". By March 2012, John Cena noted that Ryder had "fallen off the face of the earth" despite 2011's success. Ryder was eventually ranked by Pro Wrestling Torch writer Benjamin Tucker as No. 1 in the "Top 10 Crashing Stars of 2012". Tucker noted that Ryder was once again a jobber despite getting himself over in 2011.

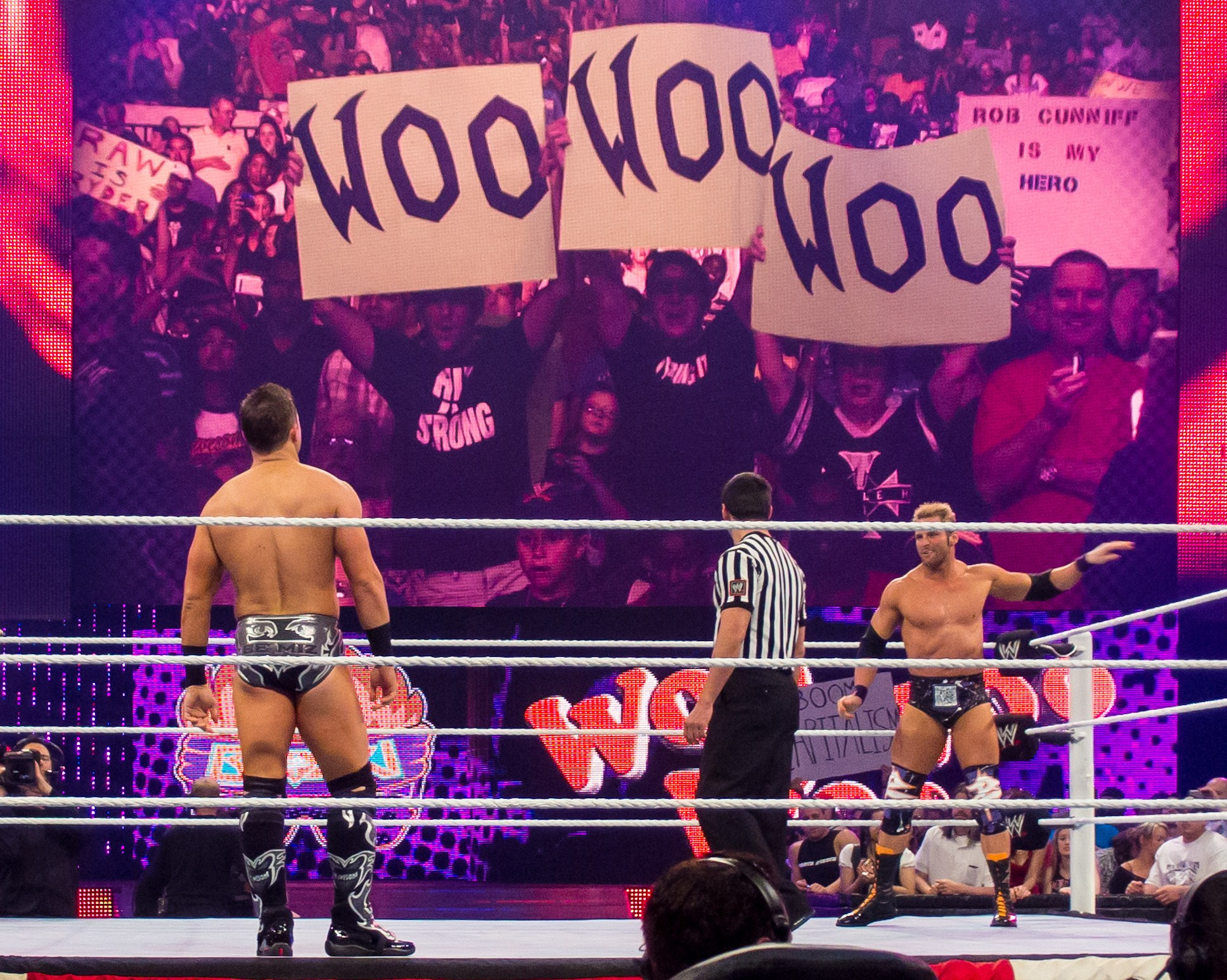
Fans supporting Ryder as he prepares to face The Miz in April 2012

Going into 2012, Ryder started trying to romance Eve as part of a romantic storyline. As Cena's friend, Ryder also became a target of Kane, who was feuding with Cena at the time and attacked Ryder on several occasions. On the January 16 episode of Raw SuperShow, Ryder lost his United States Championship to Jack Swagger due to a kayfabe rib injury he suffered at the hands of Kane; Ryder never received an automatic title rematch despite being the former champion. Ryder's injuries mounted after he was chokeslammed through the Raw SuperShow stage and Tombstoned at the Royal Rumble. On the February 13 episode of Raw SuperShow, a wheelchair-using Ryder saw Eve kiss Cena, after Cena saved her from a kidnapping by Kane. After a confrontation with Cena, Kane wheeled Ryder off the stage, injuring him even further. While Ryder was out injured, Eve sparked a heel turn for her character when she revealed that she had never liked Ryder and had disingenuously used him for fame and publicity. Ryder returned on the March 5 episode of Raw SuperShow, confronting Eve on her recent actions, but she managed to seduce him and the two shared a long backstage kiss afterwards. Ryder then joined Theodore Long's team for a match to determine the General Manager of Raw and SmackDown at WrestleMania XXVIII. During the match, Eve distracted Ryder, costing him and Team Teddy the match, and she added further insult to injury by giving Ryder a low blow after the match. After wrestling sporadically, Ryder failed to gain revenge on Kane for his attacks on him earlier in 2012, when Kane easily defeated Ryder in the pre-show match of Over the Limit. He won The Great American Bash 20-man Battle Royal on the special "Great American Bash" July 3 episode of SmackDown to become the acting SmackDown (or "ZackDown", as he called it) GM the next week.

At the Night of Champions pre-show on September 16, Ryder won a 16-man battle royal to become number one contender for the United States Championship. However, later on in the pay-per-view, he failed to capture the title from defending champion Antonio Cesaro. During the debut episode of Main Event on October 3, Ryder and Santino Marella were entered into a tournament to decide the number one contender to the tag team titles, where they defeated Justin Gabriel and Tyson Kidd to advance to the semi-finals. The following week on Raw, the duo (eventually known as Team Co-Bro) was eliminated from the tournament after losing to Team Rhodes Scholars (Cody Rhodes and Damien Sandow). As 2012 drew to a close, Ryder commented that the year had "sucked".

"... it really kind of broke the spirit of the locker room. For years, we were told... that there's a brass ring... and it's there for the taking if you work hard enough and get yourself over. And [Ryder]... defied the odds and actually does it, and all the boys are rooting for him... He got over without the [WWE] office, without TV time... And then they did just crush it and take it all away from him... It's like, you're not going to get pushed unless they pick you to get pushed, and that's kind of it".

— Ryder's former tag partner Curt Hawkins in a 2014 interview

In 2013, Ryder most commonly appeared on Superstars and lost all his singles matches on Raw and SmackDown. Ryder entered the 2013 Royal Rumble match (his only PPV match for the year) and was eliminated with no eliminations after two minutes. After weeks of the roster's emasculation at the hands of authority figure Triple H, Ryder and several other babyfaces finally saved Daniel Bryan from a beat-down by The Shield and Randy Orton on the September 16 Raw. In response, Triple H arranged for Ryder and Justin Gabriel to face Luke Harper and Erick Rowan of the Wyatt Family on the next SmackDown, where Ryder's team lost. On the next Raw, Bryan, Ryder and the other babyfaces faced the Shield in an 11-on-3 handicap elimination match; Ryder was eliminated by Roman Reigns, but his team eventually won the match.

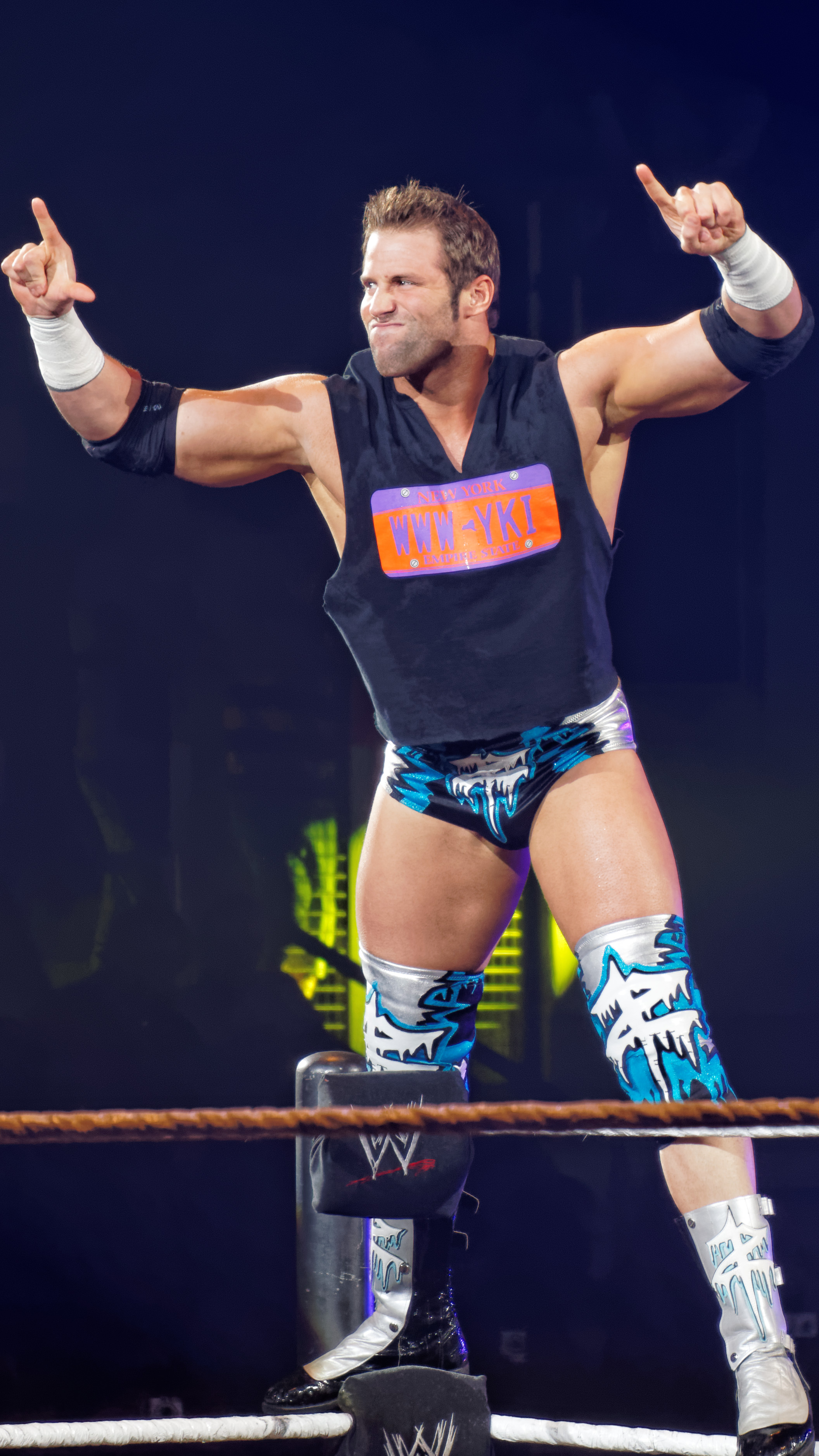
Ryder in May 2014

In January 2014, the Pro Wrestling Torch Newsletter released a ranking of WWE's roster; Ryder was ranked as a lower-tier babyface and the third lowest babyface on the roster. Ryder was also unsuccessful in winning three battle royals: the André the Giant Memorial Battle Royal at WrestleMania XXX, a battle royal for the United States Championship in May and a battle royal for the Intercontinental Championship at Battleground. On the July 21 episode of Raw, Ryder picked up his first singles victory on Raw since December 2012, but it was only after Layla interfered against Ryder's opponent, Fandango. In November 2014, Ryder announced that he had torn his rotator cuff. John Cena gave a storyline explanation that a comment on Twitter led to The Authority punishing Ryder.

Ryder returned on January 25, 2015, at the Royal Rumble in the Rumble match at No. 9 and was quickly eliminated by Bray Wyatt. Ryder participated in the 2nd annual André the Giant Memorial battle royal at WrestleMania 31 which was won by Big Show. Ryder, being accompanied by the cast of Entourage, answered Cena's United States Championship open challenge on the May 25 episode of Raw in his hometown and in the final WWE event held in the Nassau Coliseum, but failed to win after a countered 450 Splash. On the June 4 episode of SmackDown, Ryder accepted Kevin Owens' open challenge for the NXT Championship, which he lost.

==== The Hype Bros (2015–2018) ====
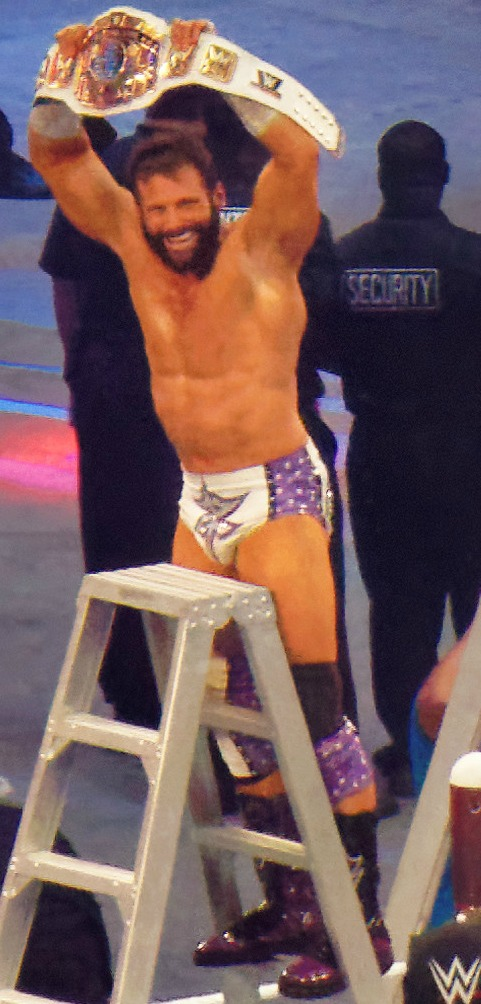
Ryder after winning the Intercontinental Championship at WrestleMania 32

In June 2015, Zack Ryder began appearing in WWE's developmental system NXT, where he formed a tag team with NXT's returning Mojo Rawley. After a month-long feud with the likes of The Mechanics (Scott Dawson and Dash Wilder) and Jason Jordan and Chad Gable, along with countless victories over the teams, The Hype Bros teamed up with Enzo Amore and Colin Cassady to defeat The Mechanics, Jordan and Gable in an 8-man tag team match at NXT TakeOver: Brooklyn. On the October 16 episode of NXT, The Hype Bros competed in a match for the NXT Tag Team Championship in a losing effort. On the October 22 episode of NXT, Ryder competed in a 26-man battle royal to determine the number one contender for the NXT Championship. Ryder was unsuccessful, although he was among the last few competitors in the match.

Meanwhile, on the main roster, Ryder continued wrestling on Superstars and Main Event from June 2015 to March 2016. He suffered singles losses to Bo Dallas, Rusev and The Miz, but managed to trade singles wins and losses with Adam Rose, Heath Slater, Stardust and Tyler Breeze.

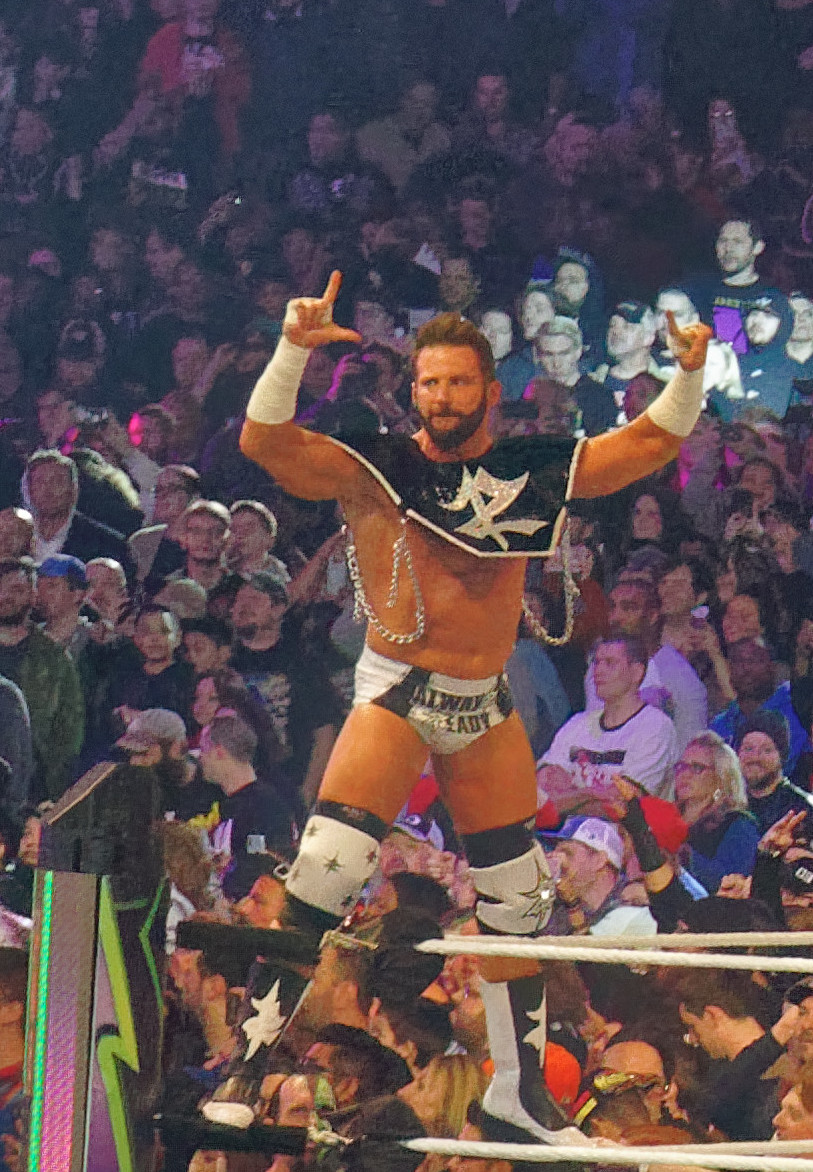
Ryder at WrestleMania 34

At WrestleMania 32, Ryder substituted Neville in the ladder match for the Intercontinental Championship and won. He lost the title to The Miz the following night on Raw. Three days later on SmackDown, Ryder received a rematch, where Maryse helped Miz to retain.

"So humorous. WWE has no story for Ryder's title win on Sunday, then ends his title run the next night to put the belt back on a mid-card heel who hasn't done anything in a while".

— Pro Wrestling Torch writer James Caldwell, after Ryder quickly lost his Intercontinental Championship to The Miz after winning it at WrestleMania 32

After that, he was put in the orbit for the United States championship, working with wrestlers like Rusev, Big Show, or Sheamus. At Battleground, Ryder was defeated by the United States champion Rusev. After the match, with Rusev continuing to beat down Ryder, Ryder's former tag team partner Mojo Rawley would make the save, thus reforming The Hype Bros tag team. On August 21 at the SummerSlam pre-show, The Hype Bros teamed with The Usos (Jimmy and Jey) and American Alpha (Jason Jordan and Chad Gable) to face The Vaudevillains (Aiden English and Simon Gotch), Breezango (Tyler Breeze and Fandango), and The Ascension (Konnor and Viktor) in a 12-man tag team match, where Ryder's team was victorious.

The Hype Bros later participated in an 8-team tournament to crown the inaugural WWE SmackDown Tag Team Champions, where The Hype Bros defeated The Vaudevillains in the first round, before losing to Heath Slater and Rhyno in the semi-finals. However, after American Alpha were removed from the tournament following an attack by The Usos, it was announced that The Hype Bros would face The Usos at the Backlash pay-per-view to determinate who would face Slater and Rhyno in the finals, but The Hype Bros would go on to lose the match. They also participated in multi-tag matches at Survivor Series and TLC: Tables Ladders and Chairs.

On the December 13 episode of SmackDown, Ryder injured his knee and was inactive for six months. He returned on the June 13, 2017, episode of SmackDown, reuniting with Rawley. On June 18, at the Money in the Bank pre-show, The Hype Bros faced The Colóns (Primo and Epico Colón)in a winning effort. Two days later on SmackDown, Shane McMahon announced that Ryder and Rawley would have an opportunity to become number one contenders for the SmackDown Tag Team Championship at the June 27 episode of SmackDown in a match against tag team champions The Usos, in which they lost.

On the November 28 episode of SmackDown Live, the team was dissolved when, after a lost against The Bludgeon Brothers (Harper and Rowan), Rawley attacked Ryder. They would face at Clash of Champions and during a tournament for the United States title with Rawley winning both matches. At WrestleMania 34, Ryder participated in the André the Giant Memorial Battle Royal, where he was eliminated by Mojo Rawley.

==== Reunion with Curt Hawkins (2018–2020) ====
On April 16, Ryder was drafted to Raw brand as part of the Superstar Shake-up, where he began to work with his former partner Curt Hawkins. On the WrestleMania 35 kickoff show, Ryder and Hawkins defeated The Revival to capture Raw Tag Team Championship. Following that, the team was largely absent from television and mainly appeared at live events. Even though they were the champions, they only made two appearances on WWE programming during the month of May: a loss to The Viking Raiders (Erik and Ivar) on the May 6 episode of Raw and a win against Luke Gallows and Karl Anderson on the May 27 episode of Main Event. On the June 10 episode of Raw, Ryder and Hawkins lost the titles back to The Revival in a tag-team triple threat match also involving The Usos. In his final pay-per-view appearance, they lost to the Viking Raiders at Elimination Chamber, The following night on Raw, Ryder was defeated by Bobby Lashley in what would be his final WWE match. He was released from the promotion along with several other superstars on April 15 as part of budget cuts stemming from the COVID-19 pandemic.

=== All Elite Wrestling / Ring of Honor (2020, 2024) ===
After leaving WWE, Cardona began to work with All Elite Wrestling (AEW) on a limited appearance deal under his real name. He made his debut on the July 29, 2020 episode of Dynamite, saving Cody from an attack by Alex Reynolds and John Silver of The Dark Order. He made his in-ring debut on the August 5 episode of Dynamite, teaming with Cody to defeat Reynolds and Silver. At the All Out pay-per-view on September 5, he teamed with Dustin Rhodes, Q. T. Marshall and Scorpio Sky in an eight-man tag team match to defeat Mr. Brodie Lee, Colt Cabana, Evil Uno and Stu Grayson of The Dark Order, which was his last match with the promotion until 2024, as it was reported he was no longer under contract with AEW.

On the March 30, 2024 episode of AEW Collision, Cardona returned to AEW, accepting Adam Copeland's open challenge for the AEW TNT Championship. He was defeated in the match. On the December 5, 2024, episode of ROH Wrestling, Cardona made his Ring of Honor (ROH) debut (AEW's sister company), challenging Chris Jericho to a ROH World Championship match at Final Battle, but he was defeated by Jericho.

=== Impact Wrestling (2021–2023) ===
After leaving AEW, Cardona began to work with Impact Wrestling in a similar limited appearance deal. He made his surprise debut on January 16, 2021, at Hard To Kill, where he defeated Ace Austin by disqualification. On the January 26 episode of Impact!, Cardona teamed with Josh Alexander to defeat Austin and Madman Fulton. Soon after, Cardona would begin a feud with his former tag team partner, Brian Myers. At No Surrender, Cardona and Eddie Edwards were defeated by Myers and Hernandez, and Cardona was defeated by Myers again at Rebellion in a singles match. The feud ended at Slammiversary, where Cardona teamed up with his real-life fiancée, Chelsea Green to defeat Myers and Tenille Dashwood. At Bound for Glory, Cardona competed in the Call Your Shot Gauntlet match, where he would be the runner-up in the match after being lastly eliminated by Moose. At Turning Point, Cardona lost to W. Morrissey with the help of Moose. On the December 2 episode of Impact!, Cardona pinned Moose in a tag team match, thus earning him an Impact World Championship match at Hard To Kill. At the event, on January 8, 2022, Cardona was unsuccessful in capturing the title in a three-way match also involving Morrissey.

On the February 3 episode of Impact!, Cardona defeated Jordynne Grace to win the Impact Digital Media Championship after hitting her with a steel chair, thus turning heel. At No Surrender, he defeated Grace by disqualification after she delivered to him a low blow. On the February 24 episode of Impact!, Cardona defeated Grace for the title again in a Dotcombat match. On the April 15 episode of Impact!, Myers reunited with Cardona and attacked W. Morrissey during an in-ring promo, with the help of Chelsea Green. At the end of the segment, they smashed Morrisey through a table. Later in the show, Green gave Mickie James a cheap shot and then knocked her down with Myers and Cardona's help. The following week, Cardona retained his title against the returning James Maritato. He would lose the title against Rich Swann during an independent event. On October 7 at Bound for Glory, Cardona made his return by competing in the Call Your Shot Gauntlet, eliminating Gisele Shaw and Taylor Wilde before being eliminated by Bhupinder Gujjar.

On May 14, 2023, Cardona confirmed he was officially done with Impact Wrestling. However, Cardona returned to Impact Wrestling on October 21, at Bound for Glory as a participant in the 20-person Intergender Call Your Shot Gauntlet match, eliminating Jake Something, Sonny Kiss, Frankie Kazarian, Eric Young and Brian Myers before being eliminated by Jordynne Grace.

=== Independent circuit (2021–2025) ===
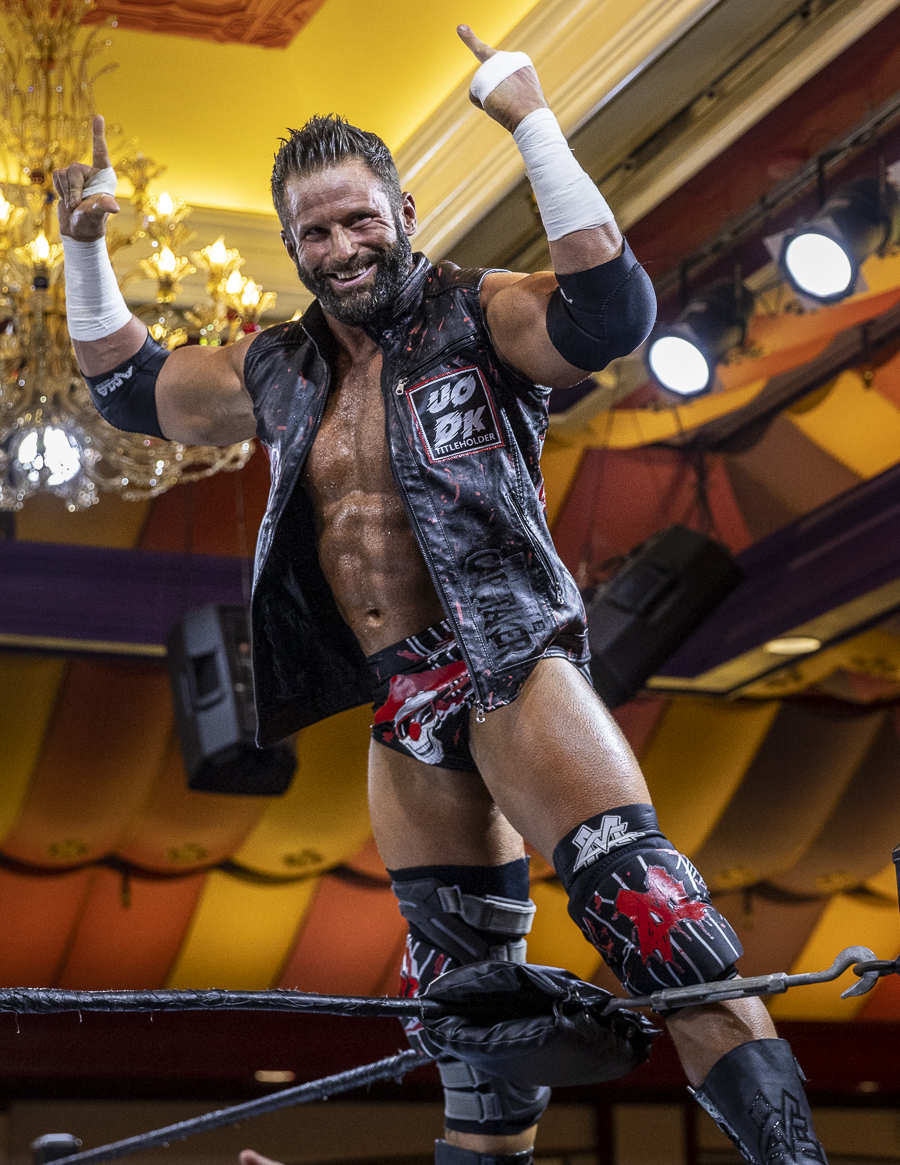
Cardona at a GCW event in 2021

Between 2021 and 2025, Cardona worked on several independent promotions, most notably Game Changer Wrestling. During these years, his work on the independent promotions was higly praised, being known as the Indy God. Cardona won the Pro Wrestling Illustrated Indie Wrestler of the Year award in 2022 and 2023 and was named by Fightful as the Male Independent Wrestler of the Year in 2022.

Cardona made his debut with GCW on June 6, 2021, at Zombie Walk, attacking Nick Gage. Cardona challenged Gage for the title at night one of GCW Homecoming in a deathmatch, winning the GCW World Championship. In GCW, he had a gimmick that tried to "fix" GCW, bringing sports entertainment elements such as dressing like Vince McMahon when he was ECW Champion, referring to the fans as GCW Universe and introducing a new title design with a spinner version of the belt. He would lose the championship to Jon Moxley on September 4, 2021, at The Art of War Games. In 2026, Cardona credited his work with GCW as the center of his success as the Indy God and the reason WWE rehired him in 2026. As part of the gimmick, he also defeated former ECW wrestler Rhino for the ECW World Television Championship.

Cardona also worked with the National Wrestling Alliance, winning the NWA World's Heavyweight Championship from Trevor Murdoch at NWA PowerrrTrip. He held the title for X days, but vacated the belt at Alwayz Ready due to an injury. He tried to regain the title at Hard Times 3 and Nuff Said, but didn't win any of the matches.

He also worked for Major League Wrestling, wrestling for the MLW World Heavyweight Championship at One Shot, but was defeated by Alex Kane. He also appeared with Japanese promotion DDT Pro-Wrestling, defeating Tetsuya Endo for the DDT Universal Championship at Wrestle Peter Pan 2023.

=== Return to TNA (2024–2025) ===
On the March 28, 2024 of TNA Impact, Cardona along with Steph De Lander returned to TNA in a 8-4-1 match. On the April 11 episode of TNA Impact, he and De Lander made a second appearance smashing Jordynne Grace through a table. Following this, Cardona would be sidelined for months, due to suffering a torn pectoral muscle.

On the August 1 episode of TNA Impact, Cardona returned and attacked PCO at his wedding with Steph De Lander. Cardona would begin a feud with PCO, as he had considered De Lander to be his "property", due to a contract agreement that De Lander had signed for her visa.

This would lead to a tag team match scheduled for Victory Road between the team of Cardona and De Lander and the team of PCO and Rhino. However, the match did not happen, as De Lander announced that she had suffered a neck injury before the match was supposed to begin. Cardona would attack Rhino, after the segment.

Cardona would then challenge PCO to a Monster's Ball match for the TNA Digital Media and International Heavyweight Championships at Bound for Glory. At the event, Cardona would lose the match.

On the January 23, 2025 episode of TNA Impact, Cardona would return to challenge Joe Hendry for the TNA World Championship in a losing effort. On October 12 at Bound for Glory, Cardona competed in the Call Your Shot Gauntlet, eliminating Zack Clayton, Eric Young and Mance Warner, who eliminated him afterwards. On December 5 at Final Resolution, Cardona defeated Warner in a Street Fight.

=== Return to WWE (2025–present) ===
Cardona made his return to WWE as part of the TNA invasion storyline with the NXT brand as Matt Cardona, wrestling his first match in five years on the October 14, 2025, episode of NXT, losing to Josh Briggs. He also participated in the "Last Time is Now" tournament to determine John Cena's final opponent as Zack Ryder, losing on the November 14 episode of SmackDown against LA Knight.

On the January 2, 2026 episode of SmackDown, Cardona signed with WWE as part of the SmackDown roster under his real name, where he defeated Kit Wilson. At the Royal Rumble on January 31, Cardona entered the match at #6 being eliminated by Oba Femi in less than a minute. In August 2026, Cardona announced that he had suffered a torn tricep.

== Professional wrestling style, persona, and reception ==
Throughout his 15-year tenure with WWE, Cardona had several gimmicks as Zack Ryder, from his debut in 2007 as an Edgehead for Edge's La Familia to a social media influencer dubbed "Long Island Iced Z" that kickstarted the "Ryder Revolution" in 2011. During this period he would use a multitude of different signature and finishing moves such as a lifting inverted DDT, an inverted overdrive dubbed the Zack Attack, and currently a jumping leg lariat dubbed the Rough Ryder, now dubbed Radio Silence.

After his departure from WWE in 2020, Cardona reinvented himself as a "super-fan of all things wrestling" who paid tribute to WWE in order to rile up fans on the independent circuit. Cardona would dress up in Vince McMahon's ECW World Heavyweight Champion outfit to one of his GCW World Championship defenses, introduced a new "spinner belt" design for the championship to parody the WWE Championship spinner belt, and took aspects of "extreme icons" including Mick Foley and The Sandman and "mutated them in his own narcissistic image."

In 2022, Cardona had taken on a "belt collector" gimmick, traveling around to various independent promotions, winning their top championships, and holding them alongside his Impact Digital Media, NWA World's Heavyweight, and self-promoted Internet Championships, holding as many as seven titles representing five different promotions at one point in April 2022, while at the end of September 2023, he held nine different belts.

Cardona is known for being one of the first wrestlers to become popular thanks to his online presence. British wrestler Drake Maverick claimed that, without him "your Twitter, Instagram, YouTube promo wouldn't exist."

== Other media ==
Matt Cardona

YouTube information
- Channel: Matt Cardona
- Years active: 2011–present
- Genre: Vlogging
- Subscribers: 166 thousand
- Views: 23.9 million
- Last updated: June 27, 2026

Cardona as Zack Ryder started a YouTube web series called Z! True Long Island Story in February 2011. The web series was a collection of short comments from Ryder, containing comedic allusions to wrestling and pop culture; it also featured cameos from his friends, family, as well as fellow WWE colleagues. The show's theme song "Just Take Care, Spike Your Hair (The Broski of the Week Song)" was written specifically about Ryder by The Luke & Duane Show. In April 2011, Ryder proclaimed himself WWE "Internet Champion" complete with a children's replica belt covered in stickers, as it was unsanctioned by WWE. In July 2011, Ryder defended his Internet Championship at a house show in Australia, against Primo. On an episode of Z! True Long Island Story, Dolph Ziggler challenged Ryder to an Internet title match at WrestleMania 29 which Ryder accepted. Ryder soon replaced the toy belt with a $1,500 custom-made belt. The title belt's center plate features an engraved illustration of Ryder's head and spiked hair while the side plates display his logo and those of YouTube, Twitter, and Facebook but these social media logos were not featured in WWE video games due to copyright issues.

On episode 50 of Z! True Long Island Story, Ryder announced the show would be part of WWE's official YouTube channel. Z! True Long Island Story ended on January 11, 2013, which was the show's 100th episode. The show was "ended" by Dolph Ziggler, who attacked Ryder with his Money in the Bank briefcase, setting up a dream sequence featuring cameos from people who had previously appeared on the show while Ryder climbed a staircase to "heaven". When Ryder woke up, he thought that the Ryder Revolution was all a dream until being told by his family and friends that it all happened. Overall, the series ran 50 episodes on Zack Ryder's YouTube channel and 50 episodes on WWE's official YouTube channel. Ryder later said that he regretted allowing WWE to move his show to their YouTube channel and that WWE had removed content from his videos. On March 10, 2014, Ryder uploaded the first episode of his new series, Zack Ryder's Last ReZort, to his own YouTube channel. In this video, Ryder (without his traditional glasses and headband) expressed his frustration regarding his dramatic plunge to the bottom of the roster, proclaiming his desire to have "lightning strike twice" and work his way back up the cards. In October 2014, Ryder and Dolph Ziggler "took over" an episode of WWE's YouTube series, The JBL (Not Cole) Show for its 99th episode, making it in turn the 101st episode of Ryder's show, Z! True Long Island Story.

In July 2011, Ryder was featured in Sports Illustrated's list of the 100 most influential Twitter users in sports. On January 16, 2013, Ryder released a music video entitled "Hoeski". The song amassed over 100,000 views in four days and was also posted on WWE's official YouTube channel. "Hoeski" peaked at No. 92 on the iTunes Pop Music chart on February 5, 2013.

Ryder has also appeared on Travel Channel's Toy Hunter and Making Fun: The Story of Funko documentaries.

Ryder has appeared in ten WWE video games. He made his in-game debut at WWE SmackDown vs. Raw 2009 and appeared in WWE SmackDown vs. Raw 2011, WWE '12, WWE '13, WWE 2K14, WWE 2K16, WWE 2K17, WWE 2K18, WWE 2K19, WWE 2K20, and as Matt Cardona in WWE 2K26 as downloadable content.

On March 18, 2017, it was announced that Ryder would be launching a new YouTube series called Z! True Comeback Story, chronicling his return to the ring after suffering a knee injury in December. In 2018, Ryder started a podcast with Curt Hawkins about wrestling figures called The Major Wrestling Figure Podcast. Ever since their WWE release, they began hosting the podcast under their current in-ring names Matt Cardona and Brian Myers respectively. The two have also started their own wrestling figure toy line titled Big Rubber Guys.

On August 20, 2022, it was revealed on Sirius XM's Busted Open Radio that Matt Cardona had joined the cast of The Last Match: A Pro-Wrestling Rock Musical as the fictional wrestling heel, Alexander Swagger opposite Ramin Karimloo and Amber Ardolino. On September 26, 2022, Cardona joined the cast for two live performances of The Last Match in Jersey City, NJ at White Eagle Hall.

On May 22, 2023, Cardona posted a new episode of Z! True Long Island Story as Zack Ryder. Steph De Lander would appear in the episode using her WWE name Persia Pirotta and stole the Internet Championship from him. Ryder would chase her into a limousine trying to get it back from her but was unable to do so as it would explode, kayfabe killing both of them. This indicates he had gained the rights to Zack Ryder and had used this to permanently write the character off.

=== Discography ===
Singles

Title	Release	Length	
Title	Release	Length	Peak iTunes chart position
"Hoeski"	2012	3:54	92

== Personal life ==
Cardona resides in Orlando, Florida. He began dating Canadian professional wrestler Chelsea Green in January 2017, and they were engaged on April 4, 2019. They were married on December 31, 2021, in Las Vegas.

Cardona is an avid fan of Ghostbusters. He has periodically donned Ghostbusters themed ring gear during matches, and discussed his love of the franchise in the 2016 documentary Ghostheads.

== Championships and accomplishments ==
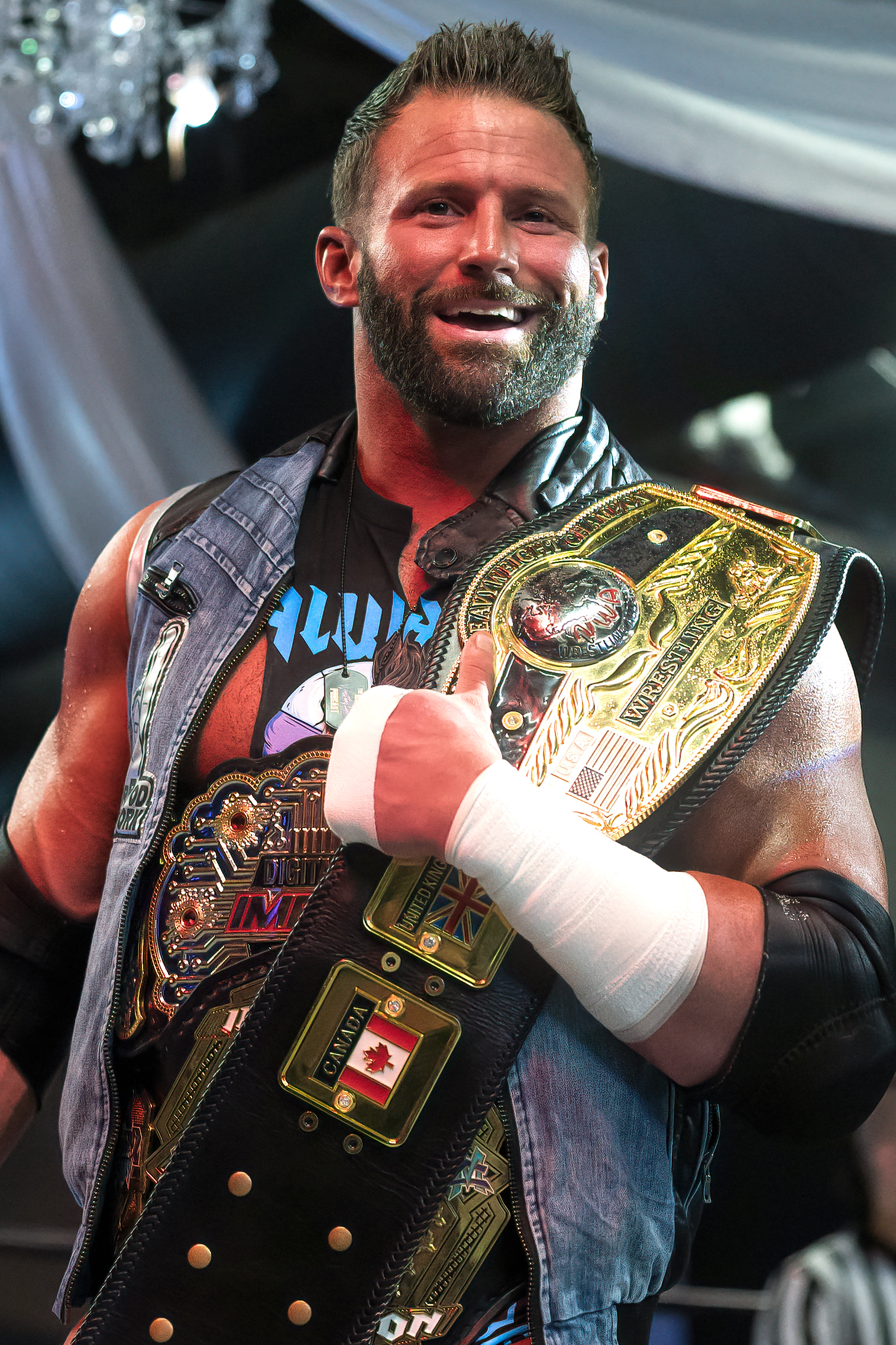
Cardona is a one-time NWA World's Heavyweight Champion...

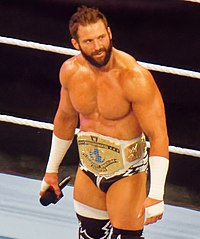
...a former Intercontinental Champion (as Zack Ryder)...

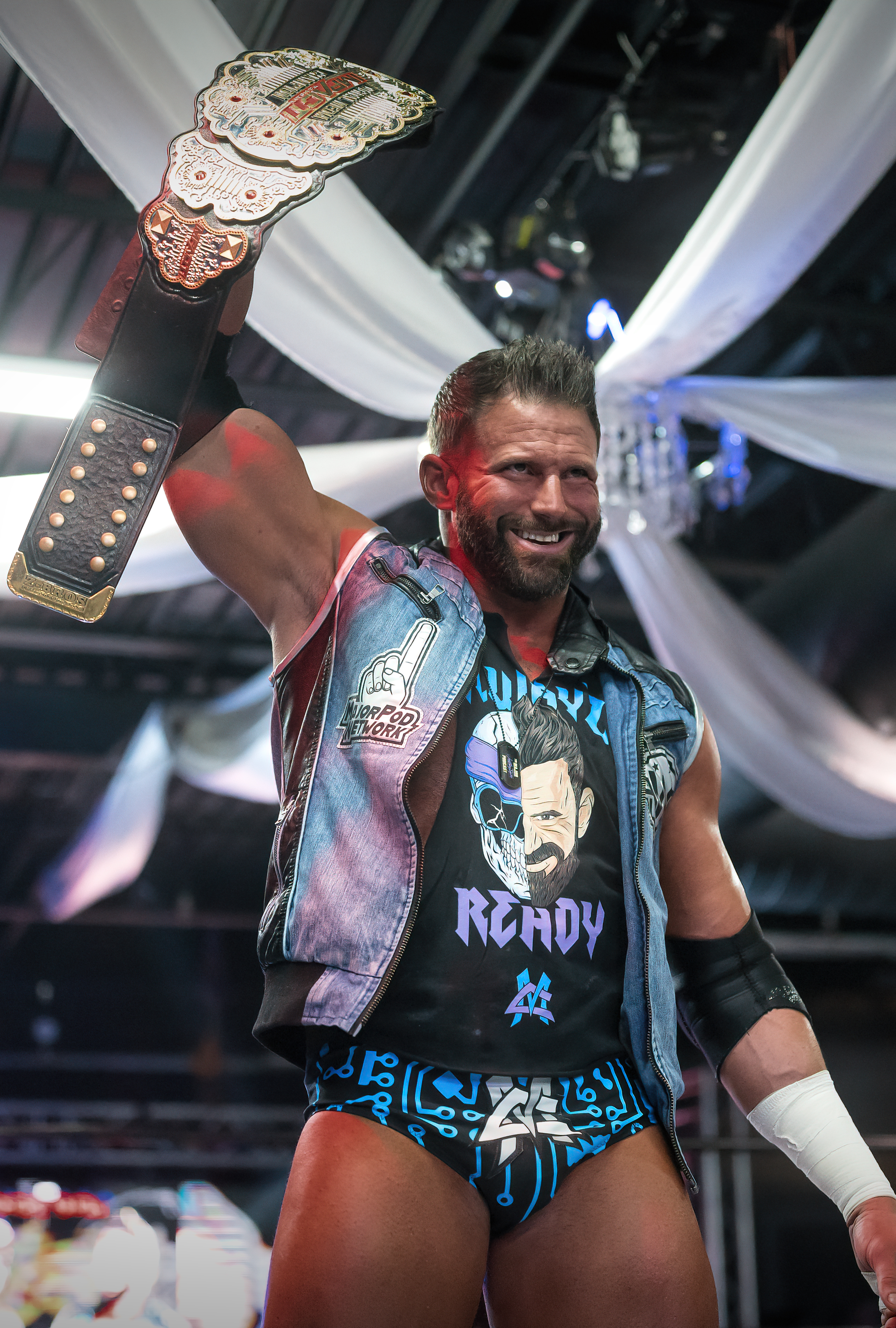
...and a former Impact Digital Champion

- Awesome Championship Wrestling
  - ACW Heavyweight Championship (1 time)
- Arizona Wrestling Federation
  - AWF Heavyweight Championship (1 time)
- Absolute Intense Wrestling
  - AIW Absolute Championship (2 times)
  - AIW Intense Championship (1 time)
- All Star Wrestling
  - ASW Heavyweight Championship (1 time)
- Chris Jericho's Rock 'N' Wrestling Rager at Sea
  - Jericho Cruise Oceanic Championship (1 time)
  - Jericho Cruise Oceanic Title Tournament (2023)
- Deep South Wrestling
  - DSW Tag Team Championship (2 times) – with Brian Majors
- DDT Pro-Wrestling
  - DDT Universal Championship (1 time)
- Empire State Wrestling
  - ESW Heavyweight Championship (1 time)
- Fightful Select
  - Male Independent Wrestler of the Year (2022)
- F1RST Wrestling
  - F1RST WrestlePalooza Championship (1 time)
- Game Changer Wrestling
  - GCW World Championship (1 time)
  - ECW World Television Championship (1 time, unrecognized)
- House of Glory
  - House of Glory Heavyweight Championship (1 time)
- Impact Wrestling
  - Impact Digital Media Championship (1 time)
- Juggalo Championship Wrestling
  - JCW Heavyweight Championship (1 time)
- National Wrestling Alliance
  - NWA World's Heavyweight Championship (1 time)
- New York Wrestling Connection
  - NYWC Heavyweight Championship (1 time)
  - NYWC Tag Team Championship (2 times) – with Brian Myers
- Ohio Valley Wrestling
  - OVW Southern Tag Team Championship (1 time) – with Brian Major
- Premier Streaming Network
  - Premier Men's Championship (1 time, inaugural)
- Premier Wrestling Federation
  - PWF New Jersey Tag Team Championship (1 time) – with Brian Myers
- Pro Wrestling Illustrated
  - Ranked No. 13 of the top 500 singles wrestlers in the PWI 500 in 2022
  - Indie Wrestler of the Year (2022, 2023)
- Qatar Pro Wrestling
  - QPW Middle East Championship (1 time, current)
- Squared Circle Expo
  - SCX Championship (1 time)
- World Series Wrestling
  - WSW World Heavyweight Championship (3 times)
- World Wrestling Entertainment / WWE
  - WWE Intercontinental Championship (1 time)
  - WWE United States Championship (1 time)
  - WWE (Raw) Tag Team Championship (2 times) – with Curt Hawkins
  - The Great American Bash Battle Royal (2012)
  - Slammy Award (3 times)
    - Most Annoying Catchphrase (2010) – Woo Woo Woo You Know It
    - Superstar Transformation of the Year (2011)
    - Trending Superstar of the Year (2011)
- The Wrestling Showcase
  - Wrestling Showcase Championship (1 time, inaugural, final)
  - Wrestling Showcase Title Tournament (2022)
- WrestlePro
  - WrestlePro Gold Championship (1 time)
- Xcite Wrestling
  - Xcite International Championship (1 time)
- Other titles
  - Internet Championship (3 times, inaugural)
