= WWE Superstars =

Professional wrestling television program

- Genre: Sports entertainment; Professional wrestling
- Created by: Vince McMahon
- Opening theme: "Invincible" by Adelitas Way (April 16, 2009–May 10, 2013), "New Day Coming" by CFO$ feat. Pilot Speed (May 17, 2013–November 26, 2016)
- Country of origin: United States
- Original language: English
- No. of seasons: 8
- No. of episodes: 398

Production
- Executive producers: Vince McMahon; Kevin Dunn
- Camera setup: Multicamera setup
- Running time: 60 minutes (inc. commercials)
- Production company: WWE

Original release
- Network: WGN America (2009–2011); WWE.com (2011–2012); Hulu Plus (2012–2016); WWE Network (2014–2016)
- Release: April 16, 2009 – November 25, 2016

Related
- WWE Raw (1993–); WWE SmackDown (1999–); WWE ECW (2006–2010); WWE Heat (1998–2008); WWE Velocity (2002–2006); WWE Main Event (2012–); WWE 205 Live (2016–2022)

WWE Superstars, or simply Superstars, is an American professional wrestling television program that was produced by WWE that originally aired on WGN America in the United States and later broadcast on the WWE Network. It debuted on April 16, 2009 and ended its domestic broadcasting on April 7, 2011. After the final domestic television broadcast, the show moved to an Internet broadcast format while maintaining a traditional television broadcast in international markets. The show featured mid-to-low card WWE Superstars in a format similar to the former shows Heat and Velocity which served the same purpose. "Enhancement talent" bouts also happened often. Big names such as John Cena, Randy Orton, The Undertaker, and Triple H appeared on the show at its beginning.

On December 19, 2008, WWE and WGN America announced an agreement to create a new weekly, one-hour prime time series entitled WWE Superstars that was to debut in April 2009 (the show was based on 1 to 4 matches occurring where superstars from both WWE SmackDown, WWE Raw and formerly WWE ECW (2006–2010) compete in matches to determine who is the best for the WWE audience's entertainment). Until early 2010, the replay also aired on WGN-TV. However, it was removed, hence eliminating distribution of the show from the Canadian fanbase. Superstars had its debut show on April 16, 2009.

On March 17, 2011, WGN America announced that they would not renew their domestic broadcasts rights to WWE Superstars, and the last episode they would air would be shown on April 7, 2011. Online reports stated that the network did not renew the series because it didn't live up to its expectations. WWE.com aired the show from April 14 to September 22, 2011 and again from October 6, 2011 to September 13, 2012. The show continued to be produced for international broadcasting until November 25, 2016.

On November 28, 2016, it was announced that Superstars had been canceled by WWE and would be replaced on the WWE Network by 205 Live. WWE Main Event would serve as the complementary show featuring Raw and SmackDown talents (and would later replace WWE Superstars for international markets).

Select episodes are viewable on the WWE Network, and episodes from September 17, 2009, until September 20, 2012, are available to watch on WWE's official YouTube channel.

== Production ==
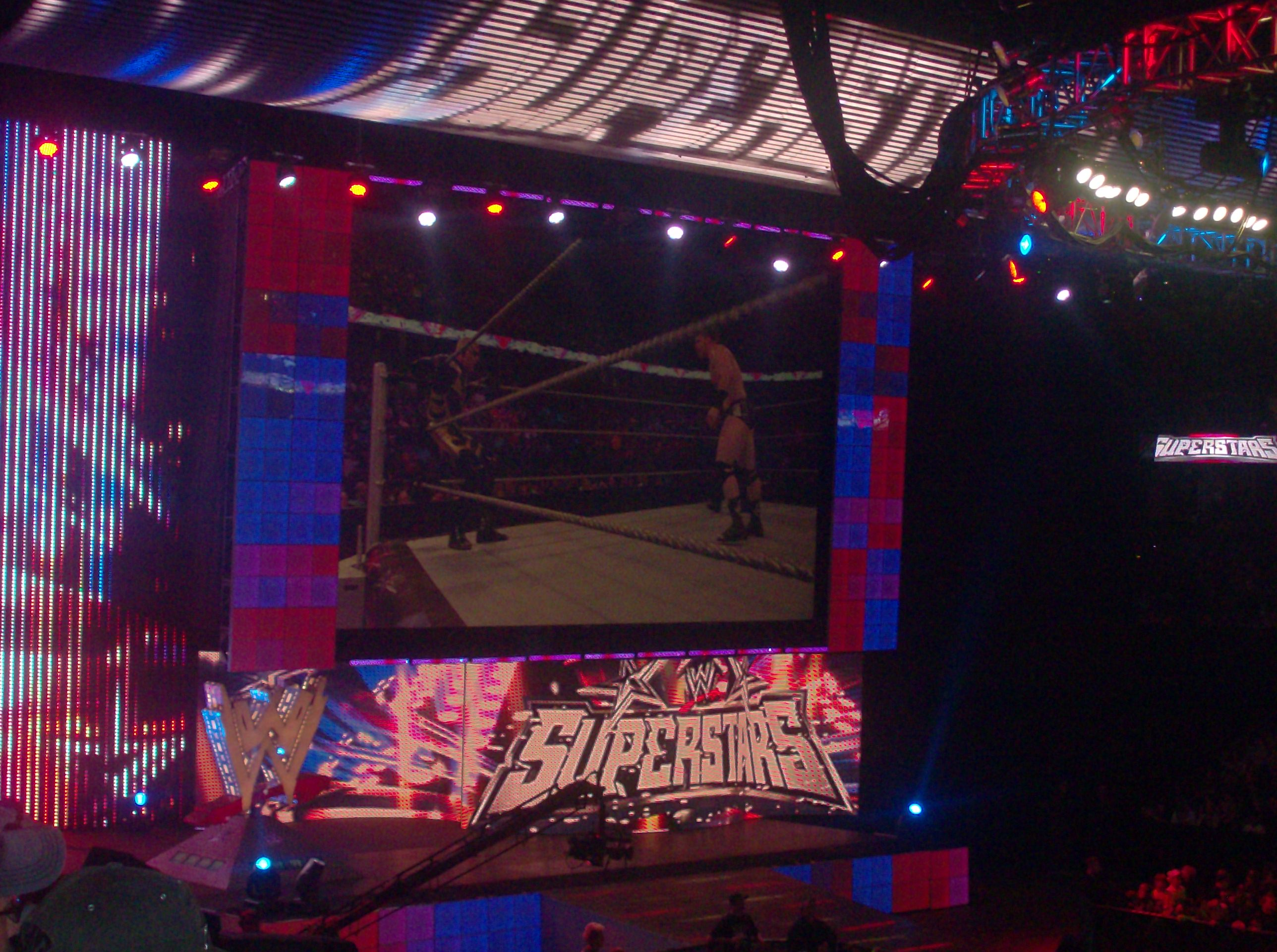
WWE Superstars' version of the universal WWE HD set used from April 16, 2009 – July 19, 2012

The last theme song for WWE Superstars was "New Day Coming" by CFO$ featuring Todd Clark, which replaced "Invincible" by Adelitas Way on May 17, 2013. The final commentators were Tom Phillips and Corey Graves, and JoJo was the last ring announcer.

Matches featured on Superstars were taped earlier in the week, during the Raw events on Monday nights. The program aired on Thursdays until January 2015 when SmackDown moved to same night. Superstars was then moved to Fridays on WWE Network, with its first Friday night airing on January 16.

== See also ==
- List of WWE television programming
