= The Getaway =

The Getaway may refer to:

== Books ==
- The Getaway (novel), a 1958 novel by Jim Thompson
- Diary of a Wimpy Kid: The Getaway, the twelfth book in the Diary of a Wimpy Kid series

== Film ==
- The Get-Away (1941 film), a 1941 remake of the 1935 crime film Public Hero No. 1
- The Getaway (1972 film), a 1972 film adaptation of the 1958 novel, starring Steve McQueen and Ali MacGraw
- The Getaway (1994 film), a 1994 film adaptation of the 1958 novel, starring Alec Baldwin and Kim Basinger

== Music ==
- The Getaway (Chris de Burgh album), 1982
- The Getaway (Red Hot Chili Peppers album), 2016
- The Getaway World Tour, 2016–17 concert tour by Red Hot Chili Peppers
- The Getaway EP, a song by English indie rock band Athlete
- "The Getaway", a song by Hilary Duff
- "The Getaway", a song by American punk band Ten Foot Pole
- "The Getaway", a song by TV Girl from French Exit

== Plays ==
- "The Getaway," a play by Charles King Van Riper, 1924

== Television ==
- "The Getaway" (Alias), a second-season episode of Alias
- "The Getaway" (Dexter), a 2009 episode of the American drama television series Dexter
- "The Getaway" (Tru Calling), a first-season episode of Tru Calling
- "The Getaway" (Everybody Loves Raymond), a third-season episode of Everybody Loves Raymond
- "The Getaway" (Legends of Tomorrow), a fourth season episode of Legends of Tomorrow
- The Getaway (TV series), a TV series on the Esquire Network
- "The Getaway" (SpongeBob SquarePants), an episode of SpongeBob SquarePants

== Video games ==
- The Getaway (pinball machine), a 1992 pinball machine made by Williams
- The Getaway (video game), 2002, the first game in the video game series The Getaway
- The Getaway: Black Monday, 2004, the second game in the video game series The Getaway
- The Getaway 3, a cancelled third game in the video game series The Getaway

== See also ==
- Getaway (disambiguation)
