= Notorious (Adelitas Way album) =

Studio album by Adelitas Way
- Released: October 20, 2017
- Genre: Hard rock, post-grunge, alternative rock, alternative metal
- Length: 30:38
- Label: Vegas Syn, The Fuel Music
- Producer: Jake Scherer, Johnny K, Brian Howes, Johnny Andrews, Dave Bassett

Adelitas Way chronology
Getaway (2016)	Notorious (2017)	Shine On (2020)

Singles from Notorious
- 1. "Ready for War (Pray for Peace)" Released: September 30, 2016; 2. "Tell Me" Released: December 16, 2016; 3. "Notorious" Released: July 7, 2017; 4. "This Goes Out to You" Released: September 29, 2017; 5. "Vibes" Released: December 14, 2017

Notorious is the fifth studio album by the American hard rock band Adelitas Way. It was released on October 20, 2017.

== History ==
The first song off the fifth record, "Ready for War (Pray for Peace)", was released on September 30, 2016. The record was announced October 2016 in an interview with 97.7 QLZ at Sonic Boom after playing the lead-off single "Ready for War (Pray for Peace)" for the first time live. Frontman Rick DeJesus stated that he wanted to take it to the next level and prove people that the band can do better than Home School Valedictorian back in 2011. He also stated that the album is going to be all over the place sonically and that it will be an exclamation point of how independent music can succeed. December 16, 2016, saw the release of the second single "Tell Me". On February 22 "Black Diamond" was released as a Pledge Music exclusive song.

== Singles ==
"Ready for War (Pray for Peace)" was the first single from Notorious released on September 30, 2016.

== Track listing ==
No.	Title	Length
1.	"Notorious"	2:50
2.	"Ready for War (Pray for Peace)"	3:31
3.	"Trapped"	4:01
4.	"Tell Me"	3:29
5.	"I Want You"	3:09
6.	"You're Not the Holy One"	3:13
7.	"Real World"	3:20
8.	"This Goes Out to You"	3:23
9.	"Vibes"	3:42
Total length:		30:38

== Personnel ==
- Rick DeJesus - Vocals
- Trevor Stafford - Drums
- Tavis Stanley - Guitar
- Andrew Cushing - Bass
