= Stuck (album) =

Studio album by Adelitas Way
- Released: July 29, 2014
- Recorded: March–November 2013
- Genres: Hard rock, post-grunge, alternative metal, alternative rock
- Length: 38:11
- Label: Virgin
- Producers: Nick Raskulinecz, Xandy Barry, Ron Fair, Brian Howes, Chris Lord-Alge

Adelitas Way chronology
Home School Valedictorian (2011)	Stuck (2014)	Deserve This EP (2015)

Singles from Stuck
- 1. "Dog on a Leash" Released: April 8, 2014; 2. "Save the World" Released: September 12, 2014; 3. "Something More" Released: 2015

Professional ratings
Review scores
Source	Rating
AllMusic	3.5/5 stars
Ultimate Guitar	7/10 stars

Stuck is the third studio album by American hard rock band Adelitas Way, it was released on July 29, 2014. The album was produced by Nick Raskulinecz, and it was released through Virgin Records. "Dog on a Leash" is the first single, while the title track "Stuck" was released as a promotional single from the album. Pre-Order on iTunes for "Stuck" was started on May 20, 2014.

== History ==
The record was Produced by Nick Raskulinecz and was recorded in Rock Falcon Studio in Nashville, Tennessee in early September and ended on November 27, 2013. The band first played the tracks "Stuck" and "We Came" on September 22, 2013 at the Birthday Bear Bash in Ft. Wayne Indiana.

== Album title meaning ==
Frontman Rick DeJesus spoke with The Pulse of Radio about the significance of the title. "I've seen through the eyes of so many people, from my friends to just my peers, myself, everyone — at some point, you know, they feel stuck in life, they feel like their feet are in the mud," he said. "You know, they feel like they're trying to pull out and trying to move forward and trying to grow, and just sometimes you can't."

== Singles ==
"Dog on a Leash" is the first single from Stuck and was released on April 8, 2014. The music video was released exclusively on April 29, 2014. The song reached number seven on the U.S. Mainstream Rock Chart. "Save the World" was announced as the second single and was released on September 12, 2014.

== Track listing ==
All tracks are written by Adelitas Way, except where noted.

No.	Title	Length
1.	"Dog on a Leash"	3:35
2.	"Save the World"	3:30
3.	"Different Kind of Animal"	3:21
4.	"Stuck"	4:04
5.	"Keep Me Waiting"	4:08
6.	"Undivided" (Rick DeJesus, Xandy Barry)	3:19
7.	"Drive" (DeJesus, Brian Howes)	3:38
8.	"Not Thinking About Me"	4:19
9.	"Blur" (DeJesus, Howes)	3:12
10.	"Something More" (DeJesus, Barry, Andrew William Alexander)	3:01
11.	"We Came"	3:21
Total length:		38:11

Deluxe Version
No.	Title	Length
12.	"What You Are"	4:27
13.	"Change the Earth"	5:50
Total length:		51:44

Best Buy Version
No.	Title	Length
12.	"Know It All" (DeJesus, Max Collins)	2:49
13.	"Someone Said You're Well"	4:11
Total length:		45:14

== Personnel ==
- Rick DeJesus – lead vocals
- Robert Zakaryan – guitars
- Trevor "Tre" Stafford – drums, percussion
- Andrew Cushing – bass guitar
