= Sick (song) =

Single by Adelitas Way

from the album Home School Valedictorian
- Released: March 11, 2011
- Recorded: September–December 2010
- Genre: Alternative metal; hard rock
- Length: 3:11
- Label: Virgin
- Songwriters: Rick DeJesus; Marti Frederiksen
- Producers: Dave Bassett; Tadpole

Adelitas Way singles chronology
"Last Stand" (2010)	"Sick" (2011)	"The Collapse" (2011)

"Sick" is the first single from Adelitas Way's second studio album, Home School Valedictorian, released on March 11, 2011. It is the band's third single in overall. This the band's first single to hit the Billboard Alternative Songs chart, reaching No. 29 and staying on the chart for 14 weeks. The song reached No. 2 on the US Mainstream Rock chart.

== Music video ==
The music video for "Sick", which was directed by Michael Maxxis, premiered on May 12, 2011. The video was filmed in the Griffith Park Tunnel in Los Angeles, California.

== Track listing ==
No.	Title	Length
1.	"Sick"	3:11

== Charts ==
=== Year-end charts ===
Chart (2011)	Position
US Hot Rock Songs (Billboard)	47
