= Dog on a Leash =

Single by Adelitas Way

from the album Stuck
- Released: April 8, 2014
- Genre: Hard rock
- Length: 3:35 (album version); 3:08 (radio edit)
- Label: Virgin
- Songwriter(s): Rick DeJesus; Trevor Stafford; Robert Zakaryan
- Producer(s): Nick Raskulinecz

Adelitas Way singles chronology
"Alive" (2012)	"Dog on a Leash" (2014)	"Save the World" (2014)

"Dog on a Leash" is a song from the American hard rock band Adelitas Way, released on April 8, 2014. It is the first single from their third studio album, Stuck and reached No. 7 on the U.S. Active Rock chart.

== Song meaning ==
Rick DeJesus explains the track is about "feeling like you need to ask permission to do what you want, like you're under the mercy of someone else, whether it's your boss or an overbearing girlfriend or boyfriend or whoever."

== Release ==
A teaser trailer was released on March 18, 2014. An audio video of song was released on April 9, 2014. The music video was released on April 29, 2014.

== Music video ==
The video (Directed by Agata Alexander) features Adelitas Way performing in a remote deserted area near a lake, when a mysterious woman appears from the depths. Frontman Rick DeJesus and the band perform the track with unbridled energy until DeJesus himself is ensnared by her beauty as she literally yanks his chain.

== Track listing ==
No.	Title	Length
1.	"Dog on a Leash"	3:08
2.	"Stuck"	4:03
