= Adelitas Way =

American rock band

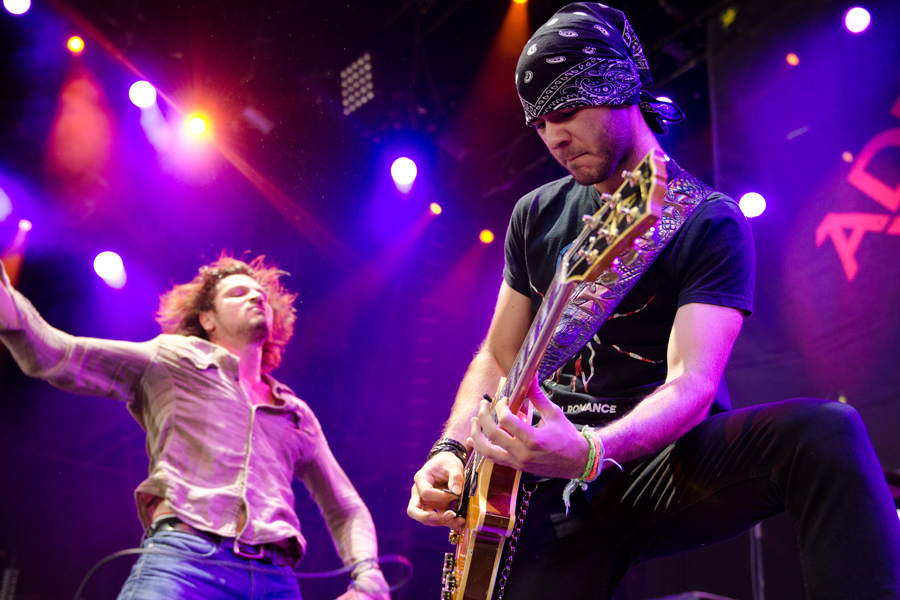
- Adelitas Way performing in 2012

Background information
- Origin: Las Vegas, Nevada, U.S.
- Genres: Hard rock; alternative rock; post-grunge
- Years active: 2006–present
- Labels: Virgin; Capitol; The Vegas Syn; The Fuel
- Members: Rick DeJesus; Trevor Stafford; Andrew Cushing; Grayson Erhard
- Past members: Keith Wallen; Tavis Stanley; Derek Johnston; Robert Zakaryan; Creighton Taylor Bibbs; Chris iOrio
- Website: adelitaswaymusic.com

Adelitas Way is an American rock band formed in Las Vegas in 2006. The band's debut single "Invincible" broke them into the mainstream scene after the song made numerous television appearances in commercials and live sporting events. The band has toured with notable acts such as Guns N' Roses, Creed, Papa Roach, Godsmack, Theory of a Deadman, Seether, Three Days Grace, Breaking Benjamin, Deftones, Puddle of Mudd, Sick Puppies, Shinedown, Staind, Alter Bridge, Skillet, Halestorm, Thousand Foot Krutch, Red and others.

== History ==
The band began working on their debut album in the fall of 2008. After signing with Virgin Records, vocalist Rick DeJesus, drummer Trevor Stafford & guitarist Chris iOrio headed for Groovemaster Studios in Chicago, Illinois where producer Johnny K awaited their arrival. The band expanded with the additions of bassist Derek Johnston and additional guitarist, Keith Wallen, completing the original line up. On April 17, 2009, the band released their debut single "Invincible" which, became the official theme song for WWE Superstars on WGN America as well as being featured in the Smackdown vs. Raw 2010 video game, MTV as well as the CSI Miami Finale. They also wrote a song called "It's A New Day", which served as the official entrance theme song for WWE's The Legacy stable. Apart from serving as the entrance music for The Legacy, it also got featured on the video game Smackdown vs. Raw 2010.

On July 14, 2009, their debut self-titled album was released. The second single off the Adelitas Way album, "Last Stand" was released on February 23, 2010. The video for "Last Stand" was directed by Paul Boyd and which premiered on March 2, 2010. The song "Scream" was featured as a soundtrack for Saw 3D in October 2010.

In January 2011, the band revealed their second album which was entitled Home School Valedictorian. The album was produced by Dave Bassett and released June 7, 2011. Adelitas Way's first single off the second album Home School Valedictorian, "Sick", was released on March 11, 2011. It reached No. 1 at Active Rock Radio, becoming the band's first No. 1 single. It was followed up by "The Collapse" in late August that same year which hit No. 2 at active rock radio. On February 16, 2012 "Criticize" was released as the third single, and reached No. 1 on the active rock chart, becoming the band's second No. 1 single from the album. "Alive" was announced as the fourth and final single, released on August 13, 2012, and reached No. 4 on the U.S. Active Rock Chart in early 2013.

Writing began in 2012 and continued through 2013. On May 7, 2013, guitarist Keith Wallen revealed through his Facebook page that he was leaving the band and became the new guitarist for Breaking Benjamin. Around the same time, original guitarist Chris iOrio also departed to join the band Foundry. In late July, it was announced that Grammy Award winning rock producer Nick Raskulinecz would be producing their third album. Recording began in early September at Rock Falcon Studio in Nashville, Tennessee. In December, bassist Derek Johnston left the band. Their first single off of the album, "Dog on a Leash", was released on April 8, 2014, followed by a music video. "Dog on a Leash" reached No. 7 on the Active Rock chart.

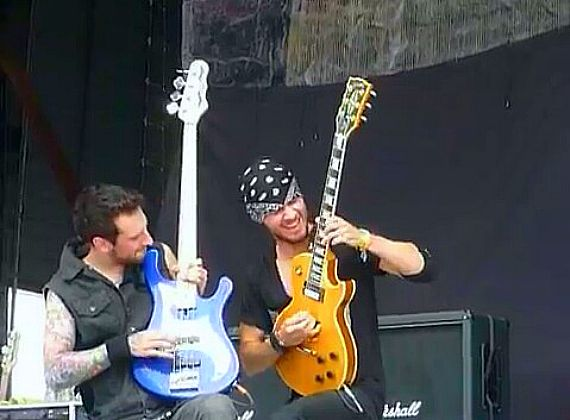
Adelitas Way performing in 2012

Stuck was released on July 29, 2014, through Virgin Records/CMG. On August 15, 2014, it was officially announced that "Save the World" would be the second single off the album and was released on September 12, 2014.

On January 14, 2015, the band announced the release of a new single, a five-song EP, and a full-length album. In an interview Rick DeJesus revealed the new single, "I Get Around". On February 12, "I Get Around" was released on for exclusive download. The band's EP Deserve This EP was released on March 11, 2015, just a week earlier than its original release date March 17. The band toured with Red in the Summer.

The lead single, "Bad Reputation", off their follow-up album, Getaway, was released on December 18, 2015. "Bad Reputation" gained generally positive reviews and rose to No. 12 on the Active Rock chart. "Bad Reputation" also reached at No. 9 on Big Uns Countdown. Getaway charted at No. 8 in Hard Rock albums on Billboard.

The first single, "Ready for War (Pray for Peace)", off their fifth studio album, Notorious, charted at No. 18 on Active Rock Radio and No. 3 on Big UNS Countdown. "Ready for War (Pray for Peace)" was the official theme song of WWE TLC: Tables, Ladders & Chairs (2016). On December 16, "Tell Me" released as the second single. On February 22 the band started their second PledgeMusic campaign for the 2017 album, and they released a song, "Black Diamond", exclusively for their pledge supporters. The title-track, "Notorious", was released on July 7, 2017. It was written and produced by DeJesus and former New Medicine member Jake Scherer.

"Still Hungry" was released as a single on April 6, 2018. And another single "Drifting" was released on July 20, 2018. Live Love Life, an EP, was released on November 2.

The band released their sixth studio album Shine On, on August 14, 2020.

The band released the Rivals EP on December 3, 2021.

The band released their seventh studio album Power on September 15, 2023.

In February 2026, the band was announced as part of the lineup for the Louder Than Life music festival in Louisville, scheduled to take place in September.

== Band members ==
Current members

- Rick DeJesus – lead vocals (2006–present)
- Trevor "Tre" Stafford – drums, percussion (2006–present)
- Andrew Cushing – bass guitar, backing vocals (2014–present)
- Grayson Erhard – guitar (2022–present)

Former members

- Chris iOrio – guitar (2006–2009)
- Creighton Taylor Bibbs – guitar (2009–2010)
- Keith Wallen – guitar, backing vocals (2009–2013)
- Derek Johnston – bass guitar (2009–2013)
- Robert Zakaryan – guitar (2011–2016)
- Tavis Stanley – guitar, backing vocals (2017–2021)

Timeline

== Discography ==
- Adelitas Way (2009)
- Home School Valedictorian (2011)
- Stuck (2014)
- Getaway (2016)
- Notorious (2017)
- Shine On (2020)
- Power (2023)
- Speak My Mind (2026)
