= The Luke & Duane Show =

Irish comedy rock duo

- The Luke & Duane Show Logo

Background information
- Origin: Cobh, County Cork, Ireland
- Genres: Rock Comedy
- Years active: 2004–2012, 2013, 2015
- Members: Luke Barry; Duane Doogan
- Website: lukeandduaneshow.com

The Luke & Duane Show were an Irish comedy rock duo from Cobh, County Cork, that consisted of members Duane Doogan & Luke Barry who gained popularity with their song "Just Take Care, Spike Your Hair (The Broski of the Week Song)", which is the official theme song for Zack Ryder's YouTube series Z! True Long Island Story and subsequently the follow-up podcast series, MC! True Long Island Story. They also performed the song used as the theme song for Aftermath on The Score Satellite Radio.

== History ==
In May 2011, they first appeared on Zack Ryder's show in Episode 13 as "The Broski's of the Week", singing a brief clip of "Just Take Care", a few days later at the request of Zack and several other wrestlers, Luke & Duane recorded a full version of the song and released it as a single. Beginning Episode 14, the song would be used as the theme song on the show and is still used today now that the show has moved to the WWE.

In February 2012, Z! True Long Island Story moved to the WWE's YouTube channel and in its inaugural episode, Luke & Duane were mentioned in a rundown of the show's one-year history.

== Later years ==
It was announced on the duo's Twitter in July 2012, that they were writing and recording new material. The duo released their second single '(There's No Such Thing As) Morgan Freeman' in November 2012. They are currently on an indefinite hiatus from the group. The duo would return for one night only in 2013 for a live show in Dublin, Ireland debuting a new song 'Mick Foley will Get You Laid' and would reunite in 2015 to write a live show as a warm-up for Scott Hall's spoken word shows across Ireland, however the shows were ultimately cancelled.

== Other media ==
The pair collaborated on many extra projects over the years most notably a web series 'Toilet Humour', which ran for 21 episodes in 2009 and was resurrected briefly for 5 episodes in 2012. They also co-hosted a professional wrestling podcast called Wrestling Voice Radio from 2010 to 2014, featuring interviews with Stone Cold Steve Austin, Bret Hart, Sting, Mick Foley, Chris Jericho and more.

== Band members ==
- Luke Barry – vocals and lyrics
- Duane Doogan – guitar and lyrics

== Discography ==
- Just Take Care, Spike Your Hair – Single (2011)
- Just Take Care, Spike Your Hair – WWE Version – Single (2012)
- (There's No Such Thing As) Morgan Freeman – Single (2012)
