= Home School Valedictorian =

Studio album by Adelitas Way
- Released: June 7, 2011
- Recorded: September 2010 – December 2010
- Genre: Alternative metal; hard rock; post-grunge
- Length: 38:36
- Label: Virgin
- Producer: Dave Bassett; Tadpole

Adelitas Way chronology
Adelitas Way (2009)	Home School Valedictorian (2011)	Stuck (2014)

Singles from Home School Valedictorian
- 1. "Sick" Released: March 11, 2011; 2. "The Collapse" Released: August 22, 2011; 3. "Criticize" Released: February 16, 2012; 4. "Alive" Released: August 13, 2012; 5. "Somebody Wishes They Were You" Released: December 4, 2012

Professional ratings
Review scores
Source	Rating
AllMusic	2.5/5 stars
Alternative Addiction	4.5/5 stars
Melodic.net	3.5/5 stars
Revolver	3/5 stars

Home School Valedictorian is the second album by Las Vegas, Nevada hard rock band Adelitas Way, released on June 7, 2011. Home School Valedictorian has sold over 120,000 copies in the US and over 500,000 singles, becoming the band's best-selling album to date.

== History ==
Adelitas Way entered the studio in September 2010 with writer/producer Dave Bassett and Tadpole in Malibu, California to record the band's follow up to their self-titled debut on Virgin Records.

The song "I Wanna Be" features guest vocals by Tyler Connolly, the vocalist/guitarist for the Canadian rock band Theory of a Deadman.

== Release and promotion ==
On January 31, the band announced that their new album Home School Valedictorian would be released on May 17. On February 4, they premiered their first single from the Home School Valedictorian album on KOMP 92.3 titled "Sick". It was then announced the band's new album, Home School Valedictorian, would be pushed back to June 7.

The first single off the album, "Sick", was released to radio on April 5, and was released as single on iTunes and Amazon on March 15. It reached No. 1 on the Active Rock chart, becoming the band's first No. 1 single. On April 15, a sample was put on the Adelitas Way YouTube channel of the upcoming album. The band's follow-up single, "The Collapse", was released on August 22 to rock radio and reached No. 3 on the Active Rock chart and No. 10 on Mainstream Rock Radio chart.

"Criticize" was the third single, and reached No. 1 on the Active Rock chart, giving the band two No. 1 songs off the record. The fourth single, "Alive", was featured and performed live by the band on ABC's Bachelor Pad, and climbed multiple radio charts. It reached No. 6 on the Active Rock chart in early 2013.

== Track listing ==
All tracks are written by Rick DeJesus, Dave Bassett and Trevor "Tre" Stafford, except for where noted.

No.	Title	Length
1.	"The Collapse"	3:38
2.	"Sick" (R.DeJesus, Marti Frederiksen)	3:11
3.	"Alive"	3:47
4.	"Criticize"	3:02
5.	"Good Enough"	3:51
6.	"Cage the Beast" (R.DeJesus, T.Stafford, Keith Wallen)	3:16
7.	"I Can Tell" (R.DeJesus, K. Wallen, T.Stafford)	3:39
8.	"Somebody Wishes They Were You" (R.DeJesus, Dave Bassett)	3:44
9.	"Move"	3:20
10.	"I Wanna Be (featuring Tyler Connolly)" (R.DeJesus, Tyler Connolly)	3:12
11.	"Hurt" (R.DeJesus, T. Stafford, K. Wallen)	3:56
Total length:		38:36

== Charts ==
Chart	Peak position
U.S. Billboard 200	66
U.S. Billboard Rock Albums	20
U.S. Billboard Alternative Albums	16
U.S. Billboard Hard Rock Albums	4

== Personnel ==
- Rick DeJesus — lead vocals
- Keith Wallen — rhythm guitar, backing vocals
- Robert Zakaryan - lead guitar
- Derek Johnston — bass guitar
- Trevor "Tre" Stafford — drums, percussion

Production

- Dave Bassett - producer, engineering, mastering
- Chris Lord-Alge - mixing
