= Deserve This =

Deserve This EP

EP by Adelitas Way
- Released: March 11, 2015
- Recorded: 2014 Groovemaster Studios, Chicago, Illinois
- Genre: Hard rock, post-grunge, alternative metal, alternative rock
- Length: 21:51
- Label: Vegas Syn
- Producer: Matt Dougherty

Adelitas Way chronology
Stuck (2014)	Deserve This EP (2015)	Getaway (2016)

Deserve This EP is an EP by the American hard rock band Adelitas Way, released on March 11, 2015 in digital format.

== Release ==
The EP's first and only single, "I Get Around", was initially released for exclusive download on the band's Pledge Music Campaign along with the EPs self-titled track. The EP was originally planned for a release on March 17, but was released a week earlier instead.

== Track listing ==
No.	Title	Length
1.	"Deserve This"	3:44
2.	"I Get Around"	3:11
3.	"Filthy Heart"	5:43
4.	"Harbor The Fugitive"	4:24
5.	"Sometimes You're Meant to Get Used"	4:48
Total length:		21:51

== Personnel ==
Adelitas Way

- Rick DeJesus – lead vocals
- Trevor Stafford – drums, percussion
- Robert Zakaryan – lead guitar, rhythm guitar
- Andrew Cushing – bass guitar
