= Getaway (Adelitas Way album) =

Studio album by Adelitas Way
- Released: February 26, 2016
- Recorded: February–November 2015
- Genre: Hard rock, post-grunge, alternative metal, alternative rock
- Length: 44:00
- Label: Vegas Syn, The Fuel Music
- Producer: Marti Frederiksen, Johnny K, Matt Dougherty, Johnny Andrews

Adelitas Way chronology
Deserve This EP (2015)	Getaway (2016)	Notorious (2017)

Singles from Getaway
- 1. "I Get Around" Released: February 12, 2015 (promoting the Deserve This EP); 2. "Bad Reputation" Released: December 18, 2015; 3. "Good Die Young" Released: 2016

Getaway is the fourth studio album by the American hard rock band Adelitas Way released on February 26, 2016.

== History ==
The album was crowd funded by fans on the band's pledge music campaign. The album was recorded at Groove master studios with producer Johnny K.

== Track listing ==
No.	Title	Length
1.	"Bad Reputation"	3:02
2.	"Getaway"	3:18
3.	"Good Die Young"	3:45
4.	"Low"	3:37
5.	"Put You in Place"	4:20
6.	"I Get Around"	3:11
7.	"Filthy Heart"	5:43
8.	"Harbor the Fugitive"	4:24
9.	"Sometimes You're Meant to Get Used"	4:48
10.	"Shame"	4:06
11.	"Deserve This"	3:45
Total length:		44:00

== Personnel ==
- Rick DeJesus - Vocals
- Trevor Stafford - Drums
- Robert Zakaryan - Guitar
- Andrew Cushing - Bass
