= Adelitas Way (album) =

Studio album by Adelitas Way
- Released: July 14, 2009
- Recorded: 2008–2009
- Genre: Alternative metal; hard rock; post-grunge
- Length: 40:41
- Label: Virgin
- Producer: Johnny K; Brian Howes

Adelitas Way chronology
Adelitas Way (2009)	Home School Valedictorian (2011)

Singles from Adelitas Way
- 1. "Invincible" Released: April 17, 2009; 2. "Last Stand" Released: February 23, 2010

Professional ratings
Review scores
Source	Rating
AllMusic	3/5 stars
Rock on Request	favorable
TuneLab Music	8.5/10 stars

Adelitas Way is the debut album by Adelitas Way, released on July 14, 2009. It is the first and only album to feature guitarist Chris Iorio before leaving the band a few months after the album was released. A limited edition autographed booklet was included when you pre-ordered the album on Newbury Comics. The album has sold over 200,000 copies, and over 1 million singles.

== Album cover ==
According to guitarist Chris Iorio, the album cover is an interpretation of when Rick DeJesus met a young woman who worked in a brothel, when he went to Tijuana, Mexico – "Rick met the girl and she poured her heart out to him and it really touched him...people’s lives can be so tough – we’re in a recession, North Korea is talking about going to war with us, Mexico just had the swine flu and the album cover is an interpretation of times in our lives when things might look bad but knowing that you can always overcome your biggest obstacles."

== Track listing ==
All tracks are written by Rick DeJesus and Brian Howes, except where noted.

No.	Title	Length
1.	"Invincible" (DeJesus, Chris Iorio, Dave Bassett)	3:10
2.	"Scream" (DeJesus, Iorio)	3:34
3.	"Dirty Little Thing" (DeJesus, Iorio, Marti Frederiksen)	3:31
4.	"Last Stand"	3:44
5.	"Hate Love"	2:50
6.	"So What If You Go" (DeJesus, Iorio, Pierre Paquet)	4:18
7.	"Closer to You" (DeJesus)	3:36
8.	"Just a Little Bit"	3:19
9.	"All Falls Down" (DeJesus)	3:53
10.	"My Derailment"	3:36
11.	"Brother" (DeJesus)	5:04
Total length:		40:41

Japanese edition
No.	Title	Length
12.	"Inside – Bonus Recording"	3:51
13.	"Invincible – CD-Rom Video"	3:09
Total length:		47:41

== Personnel ==
Adelitas Way

- Rick DeJesus – lead vocals
- Chris Iorio – lead guitar
- Keith Wallen – rhythm guitar, backing vocals
- Derek Johnston – bass guitar
- Trevor "Tre" Stafford – drums, percussion

Production

- Brian Howes – production on “Last Stand”
- Johnny K – production (1–11) except “Last Stand” and “Inside”
- Bob Marlette – production on “Inside”
- Chris Lord-Alge – mixing on “Last Stand”
- Mike Watts – mixing on “Hate Love”, “Close to You”, “Just a Little Bit”, “All Falls Down”, “My Derailment”, and “Brother”
- Neal Avron – mixing on “Invincible”, “Scream”, “Dirty Little Thing”, and “So What If You Go”
- George Marino – mastering
- Keith Armstrong – assistant mixing
- Nik Karpen – assistant mixing
- Nicolas Fournier – assistant mixing
- Jason “JVP” Van Poederooyen – digital editing, engineer
- Brian Coisne – assistant engineer
- Misha Rajaratnam – digital editing
- Marco Tambasco – guitar tech

Additional personnel

- Brian Howes – additional guitar, additional vocals, additional keyboards, composer on “Last Stand”, “Hate Love”, “Closer to You”, “Just a Little Bit”, “My Derailment”, and “Brother”
- Kevin Churko – composer on “So What If You Go”
- Dave Bassett – composer on “Invincible”
- Gordini Sran – composer on “Closer to You”
- Jordan Oorbeck – composer on “Closer to You”
- Marti Frederiksen – composer on “Dirty Little Thing”
- Bob Marlette – composer on “Inside”
