= Red discography =

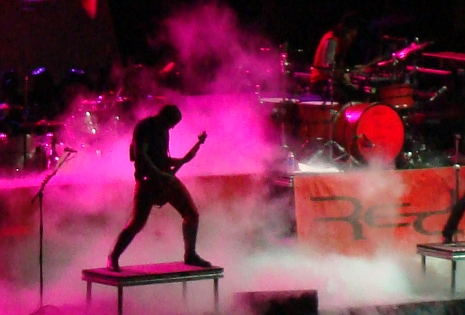
- Red at the 2011 Winter Jam
- Studio albums: 8
- Extended plays: 5
- Singles: 46
- Music videos: 16

This is a comprehensive discography of official recordings by Red, an American Christian rock band from Nashville. Red has released eight studio albums, five extended plays, 46 singles, and 16 music videos.

== Albums ==
=== Studio albums ===
Title	Details	Peak chart positions							Certifications	Sales
Title	Details	US	US Rock	US Indie	US Christ	US Alt	US Digital	US Hard Rock	Certifications	Sales
End of Silence	Release date: June 6, 2006; Label: Essential Records/Sony BMG; Formats: CD, digital download	194	—	17	7	—	—	—	RIAA: Gold	US: 500,000+
Innocence & Instinct	Release date: February 10, 2009; Label: Essential/Sony; Formats: CD, digital download	15	6	1	1	4	7	—		US: 260,000+
Until We Have Faces	Release date: February 1, 2011; Label: Essential/Sony; Formats: CD, digital download	2	1	1	1	1	2	1		US: 100,000+
Release the Panic	Release date: February 5, 2013; Label: Essential/Sony; Formats: CD, digital download	7	2	2	1	2	7	1		US: 100,000+
Of Beauty and Rage	Release date: February 24, 2015; Label: Essential/Sony; Formats: CD, digital download	14	3	1	1	2	8	1		US: 113,000
Gone	Release date: October 27, 2017; Label: Essential; Formats: CD, digital download	38	7	—	1	5	8	2		
Declaration	Release date: April 3, 2020; Label: Red Entertainment/The Fuel Music; Formats: CD, LP, digital download	61	6	8	2	4	—	3		
Rated R	Release date: September 29, 2023; Label: Red Entertainment/The Fuel Music; Formats: CD, LP, digital download	— (Note: Rated R did not enter the Billboard 200, but peaked at No. 63 on the Billboard Top Album Sales)	—	—	10	—	—	—		
"—" denotes releases that did not chart

=== Other albums ===
Title	Album details
Red String Tribute	Release date: May 13, 2008; Label: CC Entertainment
Until We Have Faces: Live and Unplugged	Release date: December 2, 2022; Label: Red Enterprises, Inc.

== Extended plays ==
Title	Extended play details	Chart peaks				
Title	Extended play details	US	US Rock	US Indie	US Christ	US Hard Rock
Red	Release date: 2004; Label: Independent	—	—	—	—	—
Breathe Into Me	Release date: May 22, 2007; Label: Essential Records	—	—	—	—	—
Connect Sets	Release date: December 18, 2007; Label: Essential, Sony Connect	—	—	—	—	—
Not Alone (Performance Tracks)	Release date: April 8, 2011; Label: Provident Label Group	—	—	—	—	—
Release the Panic: Recalibrated	Release date: April 29, 2014; Label: Essential	75	23	19	8	5
The Evening Hate	Release date: November 1, 2019; Label: Red Entertainment/The Fuel Music	—	—	—	—	—
"—" denotes a release that did not chart.

== Singles ==
Title	Year	Chart positions									Certifications (sales threshold)	Album
Title	Year	US Rock	US Alt	US Main	US Active	US Christ	US Christ Air	US Christ Digital	US Christ Stream	US Christ Rock	Certifications (sales threshold)	Album
"Breathe Into Me"	2006	—	—	15	10	—	—	43	—	1	RIAA: Gold	End of Silence
"Break Me Down"	2006	—	—	—	—	—	—	—	—	1		End of Silence
"Let Go"	2007	—	—	21	17	—	—	—	—	1		End of Silence
"Hide"	2007	—	—	—	—	25		—	—	1		End of Silence
"Pieces"	2007	—	—	—	—	25		—	—	—		End of Silence
"Already Over"	2008	—	— (Note: "Already Over" did not enter the Billboard Hot Alternative Songs, but peaked at No. 26 on the Billboard Alternative Airplay)	18	16	—		—	—	1	RIAA: Gold	End of Silence
"Fight Inside"	2008	—	—	—	—	—		—	—	1		Innocence & Instinct
"Never Be the Same"	2008	—	—	—	—	24		—	—	—		Innocence & Instinct
"Death of Me"	2008	40	40	9	7	—		—	—	1		Innocence & Instinct
"Forever"	2009	48	48	23	19	—		—	—	1		Innocence & Instinct (deluxe edition)
"Mystery of You"	2009	—	—	—	—	— (Note: "Mystery of You" did not enter the Billboard Hot Christian Songs, but peaked at No. 27 on the Billboard Christian CHR)		—	—	1		Innocence & Instinct
"Start Again"	2009	—	—	—	—	— (Note: "Start Again" did not enter the Billboard Hot Christian Songs, but peaked at No. 25 on the Billboard Christian CHR)		—	—	—		Innocence & Instinct
"Ordinary World"	2010	—	—	—	38	—		—	—	10		Innocence & Instinct
"Faceless"	2010	— (Note: "Faceless" did not enter the Billboard Hot 100, but peaked at No. 21 on the Billboard Hard Rock Digital Song Sales)	—	—	—	29		6	—	1		Until We Have Faces
"Feed the Machine"	2011	—	—	21	18	—		19	—	8		Until We Have Faces
"Not Alone"	2011	—	—	—	8	34		18	8	—		Until We Have Faces
"Lie to Me (Denial)"	2011	— (Note: "Lie to Me (Denial)" did not enter the Billboard Hot 100, but peaked at No. 5 on the Billboard Hard Rock Digital Song Sales)	— (Note: "Lie To Me (Denial)" did not enter the Billboard Hot Alternative Songs, but peaked at No. 14 on the Billboard Alternative Digital Song Sales)	30	26	—		1	—	—		Until We Have Faces
"Who We Are"	2012	—	—	—	—	— (Note: "Who We Are" did not enter the Billboard Hot Christian Songs, but peaked at No. 26 on the Billboard Christian CHR)		—	—	1		Until We Have Faces
"Buried Beneath"	2012	—	—	—	—	—		—	—	1		Until We Have Faces
"Perfect Life"	2013	— (Note: "Perfect Life" did not enter the Billboard Hot 100, but peaked at No. 15 on the Billboard Hard Rock Digital Song Sales)	—	24	22	—		6	—	1		Release the Panic
"Release the Panic"	2013	—	—	—	—	—		17	—	—		Release the Panic
"Hold Me Now"	2013	— (Note: "Hold Me Now" did not enter the Billboard Hot 100, but peaked at No. 14 on the Billboard Hard Rock Digital Song Sales)	—	—	—	40		11	—	—		Release the Panic
"Die for You"	2013	—	—	—	—	—		—	—	1		Release the Panic
"So Far Away"	2013	— (Note: "So Far Away" did not enter the Billboard Hot 100, but peaked at No. 6 on the Billboard Hard Rock Digital Song Sales)	—	—	—	—		5	—	1		Release the Panic
"Run and Escape"	2014	—	—	—	—	—	—	—	—	1		Release the Panic: Recalibrated
"Darkest Part"	2015	—	—	33	—	21	—	16	—	1		Of Beauty and Rage
"Yours Again"	2015	—	—	—	—	28	—	26	—	1		Of Beauty and Rage
"Take Me Over"	2015	—	—	—	—	48	—	—	—	1		Of Beauty and Rage
"Shadow and Soul"	2015	—	—	—	—	—	—	—	—	—		Of Beauty and Rage
"Part That's Holding On"	2015	—	—	—	—	43	—	—	—	—		Of Beauty and Rage
"Fight to Forget"	2016	—	—	—	—	—	—	—	—	—		Of Beauty and Rage
"The Ever"	2016	—	—	—	—	—	—	—	—	—		Of Beauty and Rage
"Still Alive"	2017	—	—	23	—	45	—	—	—	1		Gone
"Losing Control"	2017	—	—	—	—	—	—	—	—	—		Gone
"Gone"	2017	—	—	34	—	44	—	—	—	1		Gone
"Fracture"	2018	—	—	—	—	—	—	—	—	—		Gone
"Coming Apart"	2018	—	—	—	—	—	—	—	—	—		Gone
"Unstoppable"	2018	—	—	—	—	—	—	—	—	2		Gone
"The Evening Hate"	2019	— (Note: "The Evening Hate" did not enter the Billboard Hot 100, but peaked at No. 15 on the Billboard Hard Rock Digital Song Sales)	— (Note: "The Evening Hate" did not enter the Billboard Hot Alternative Songs, but peaked at No. 25 on the Billboard Alternative Digital Song Sales)	—	—	29	—	7	—	—		Declaration
"From the Ashes"	2019	—	—	—	—	50	—	15	—	—		Declaration
"Hemorrhage (In My Hands)"	2019	—	—	—	—	—	—	—	—	—		The Evening Hate
"Sever"	2020	—	—	—	—	50	—	21	—	— (Note: "Sever" did not enter the Billboard Christian Rock due to the chart being discontinued in 2019, but peaked at No. 1 on ChristianRock.net)		Declaration
"All For You"	2020	—	—	—	—	—	—	—	—	—		Declaration
"The War We Made"	2020	—	—	34	—	48	—	—	—	— (Note: "The War We Made" did not enter the Billboard Christian Rock due to the chart being discontinued in 2019, but peaked at No. 21 on ChristianRock.net)		Declaration
"Surrogates"	2023	—	—	—	—	—	—	—	—	— (Note: "Surrogates" did not enter the Billboard Christian Rock due to the chart being discontinued in 2019, but peaked at No. 8 on ChristianRock.net)		Rated R
"Cold World"	2023	—	—	—	—	—	—	—	—	—		Rated R
"Minus It All"	2023	—	—	—	—	—	—	—	—	—		Rated R
"—" denotes a recording that did not chart

=== Other charted songs ===
Title	Year	Chart positions		Album
Title	Year	US Christ	US Christ Digital	Album
"Let It Burn"	2011	—	36	Until We Have Faces
"Best Is Yet to Come"	2011	—	40	Until We Have Faces
"As You Go"	2013	—	48	Release the Panic (deluxe edition)
"Impostor"	2015	39	—	Of Beauty and Rage
"—" denotes a recording that did not chart

== Guest appearances ==
Song(s)	Artist	Album	Year
"Failure (Aurora Version)"	Breaking Benjamin	Aurora	2020
"I Get Wicked"	Thousand Foot Krutch	The End Is Where We Begin: Reignited	2024

== Music videos ==
Year	Title	Album	Director	Type	Source
2006	"Breathe Into Me"	End of Silence	—	Performance	YouTube
2007	"Let Go"	End of Silence	—	Live Performance	YouTube
2008	"Already Over"	End of Silence	—	Performance	YouTube
2008	"Death of Me"	Innocence & Instinct	—	Performance	YouTube
2009	"Forever"	Innocence & Instinct	—	Live Performance	YouTube
2010	"Ordinary World"	Innocence & Instinct	Jeremy Hughes	Performance	YouTube
2011	"Feed the Machine"	Until We Have Faces	Andy Erwin	Narrative	YouTube
2011	"Lie to Me (Denial)"	Until We Have Faces	—	Performance	YouTube
2012	"Not Alone"	Until We Have Faces	—	Fan-made video	YouTube
2013	"Release the Panic"	Release the Panic	—	Narrative	YouTube
2013	"Perfect Life"	Release the Panic	—	Performance	YouTube
2015	"Darkest Part"	Of Beauty and Rage	Matt Lawrence	Narrative	YouTube
2017	"Gone" (version 1)	Gone	—	Performance	YouTube
2018	"Gone" (version 2)	Gone	—	Live Performance	YouTube
2018	"Unstoppable"	Gone	—	Live Performance	YouTube
2019	"The Evening Hate"	Declaration	Randy Armstrong	Narrative	YouTube
2020	"The War We Made" (version 1)	Declaration	Courtney Dellafiora	Live Performance	YouTube
2021	"Cauterize"	Declaration	Steven Primo	Performance	YouTube
2021	"Infidel"	Declaration	Steven Primo	Performance	YouTube
2021	"The War We Made" (version 2)	Declaration	Steven Primo	Performance	YouTube
2023	"Surrogates"	Rated R	Brian Medeiros and Randy Armstrong	Performance	

== Compilation appearances ==
Title	Album details
X 2006	Release date: 2006; Label: Tooth and Nail Records; Song: "Already Over"
WOW Hits 2008	Release date: 2007; Label: Word Entertainment; Song: "Breathe Into Me" (Screamless Edit)
X 2008	Release date: 2008; Label: Tooth and Nail Records; Song: "Breathe Into Me"
WOW Hits 2009	Release date: October 7, 2008; Label: Word Entertainment; Song: "Already Over"
WOW Hits 2010	Release date: October 6, 2009; Label: Word Entertainment; Song: "Never Be the Same"
X 2010	Release date: 2010; Label: Tooth and Nail Records; Song: "Fight Inside"
WOW Hits 2012	Release date: September 27, 2011; Label: Word Entertainment; Song: "Faceless"
X 2012	Release date: April 10, 2012; Label: Tooth and Nail Records; Song: "Faceless"
