= Rated R (Red album) =

Studio album by Red
- Released: September 29, 2023
- Genres: Christian rock; Christian metal; nu metal; hard rock; symphonic rock; electronic rock
- Length: 33:50
- Labels: Red Entertainment, The Fuel
- Producer: Anthony Armstrong

Red chronology
| Declaration (2020) | Rated R (2023) |

Singles from Rated R
- 1. "Surrogates" Released: August 4, 2023; 2. "Cold World" / "Minus It All" Released: September 1, 2023

Rated R is the eighth studio album by American Christian rock band Red. It was released on September 29, 2023 through the band's independent label Red Entertainment in collaboration with The Fuel Music. The album was produced by Anthony Armstrong, the band's guitarist. It is the only studio album to feature drummer Brian Medeiros, who joined in 2021. It is also the final studio album to feature original lead singer Michael Barnes.

With regard to the album title, bassist Randy Armstrong explains, "It's Rated R for Red, and we always try and be a bit provocative to get our audience thinking with how our records look and what they're called."

== Background ==
The album is produced by the band's guitarist, Anthony Armstrong, making it their first studio album to be entirely self-produced. Joe Rickard, who is the band's long-time friend and former drummer, did the mixing for the album, a role he also provided on their previous album, Declaration, as well as co-writing the lead single, "Surrogates". The album also features songwriting credit from Keith Wallen, who also co-wrote "Sever", the band's second single from Declaration.

== Release and promotion ==
The group's first live album, Until We Have Faces: Live and Unplugged, was released on December 2, 2022. During the announcement of the live album's release, the band also announced that they will release a new album sometime in spring 2023. The band went on both headlining tours and supporting tours with American bands Alter Bridge, Mammoth WVH and Pistols at Dawn for January and the majority of February.

On January 24, 2023, they revealed the name of the new album on their Facebook page. In February 2023, the band released a snippet that shows a string recording session for the album. On June 16, they revealed the album would be released on September 29, 2023, while also stating that the lead single of the album titled "Surrogates" would be available for all streaming services on August 4. The band also announced they embark on the "Rated R Tour", which started in September and will carry on until 2024. On August 4, the band released the single. On September 1, they unveiled two singles "Cold World" and "Minus It All". On January 9, 2024, an official lyric video for "Cold World" was released on their YouTube Channel.

== Critical reception ==
Professional ratings
Aggregate scores
| Source | Rating |
|---|---|
| Album of the Year | 70/100 |
Review scores
| Source | Rating |
| Jesusfreakhideout.com | 4.5/5 stars 4/5 stars |
| Sputnikmusic | 3.5/5 stars |
| Today's Christian Entertainment | 2.5/5 stars 3.5/5 stars |
| Cryptic Rock | 5/5 stars |

Rated R received generally favorable reviews from fans and critics, who praised the production, concept and musicianship, however criticism was aimed towards the short runtime. The songwriting received a polarizing reception.

Jesus Freak Hideout said of the album, "Rated R is far less controversial than the title implies but fitting in the sense that it is a thoroughly Red album filled with hard-hitting guitar riffs, the unmistakable emotional vocals of Michael Barnes, and an abundance of strings. A step up from the already strong Declaration (but perhaps not quite as ambitious as Of Beauty and Rage), this is a satisfying and evocative entry for the RED catalog." Tyler White for Sputnikmusic said, "While Rated R feels like a stronger return to form following Declaration and Gone, the band still feels like it's reaching for what they've lost from the past. The orchestral elements are back, the production has improved, and Red has brought back their darker side, it doesn't quite meet the same peaks as Innocence & Instinct or Of Beauty and Rage. Nevertheless, this is a step back in the right direction for the band as they bring back the elements and style they were once excelling at."

Cryptic Rock also praised the album, concluding: "Overall, Red does not disappoint with Rated R and continues to show that they can still spark a fire in your soul. Much like a good deal of their previous work, Rated R is, as mentioned, highly cinematic. Playing like classic movements, the vocal performance of Barnes only amplifies everything to the next level… think of it all as a cry for humankind. However, it is not all meant to be doom and gloom, because the key objective is to be a cathartic release, and raise a warning to stop, look, and listen to what is happening around us. It is easy to fall into the traps of the modern world with the bombardment of media of all types, the divisive persuasions, and the false, twisted ideals. Thankfully bands like Red remind us the most important thing is, we are alive, we should always think for ourselves, but yet broadly conscience, and think about others."

== Track listing ==
| No. | Title | Writer(s) | Length |
|---|---|---|---|
| 1. | "Surrogates" | Anthony Armstrong, Joe Rickard | 3:00 |
| 2. | "Your Devil Is a Ghost" | A. Armstrong, Lucio Rubino | 3:11 |
| 3. | "Minus It All" | A. Armstrong | 3:24 |
| 4. | "Cold World" | A. Armstrong, Keith Wallen | 3:09 |
| 5. | "Tell Me How to Say Goodbye" | A. Armstrong, Rubino, Jeremy Thomas | 3:49 |
| 6. | "The Suffering" | A. Armstrong, Michael Barnes | 3:29 |
| 7. | "Still Bleeding" | A. Armstrong, Rubino, Barnes | 3:22 |
| 8. | "Our Time Will Come" | A. Armstrong, Wallen | 3:44 |
| 9. | "Last Forever" | A. Armstrong, Rubino, Barnes | 3:20 |
| 10. | "Emergency" | A. Armstrong, Barnes, Jason McArthur | 3:22 |
| Total length: | | | 33:50 |

== Personnel ==
Red

- Michael Barnes – lead vocals
- Anthony Armstrong – guitars, backing vocals, additional vocals (2), programming
- Randy Armstrong – bass, backing vocals, piano
- Brian Medeiros – drums

Additional musicians

- Teirney Armstrong – additional vocals (5)
- Elizabeth Lamb – viola
- Monica Angelo – viola
- Carole Rabinowitz – cello
- Paul Nelson – cello
- David Angell – violin
- Karen Winkelmann – violin
- Janet Darnall – violin
- Ali Hoffman – violin

Production

- Anthony Armstrong – production
- Randy Armstrong – executive producer
- Lucio Rubino – co-producer on "Tell Me How To Say Goodbye"
- Joe Rickard – mixing
- Ted Jensen – mastering
- Paul DeCarli – digital editing
- Mike Plotnikoff – engineer
- Randy Beasterfield – engineer on "Surrogates"
- Clayton Blue – engineer
- Taylor Pollert – engineer
- Courtney Dellafiora – artwork, design, photography

Additional personnel

- David Davidson – string arranger
- Joe Rickard – drum programming
- Jay Wud – keyboard programming
- Lucio Rubino – programming, additional bass guitar

== Charts ==
Rated R chart performance
| Chart (2023) | Peak position |
|---|---|
| US Top Christian Albums (Billboard) | 10 |
| US Top Album Sales (Billboard) | 98 |
| US Top Current Album Sales (Billboard) | 63 |
