= Howard Benson =

American record producer (born 1956)

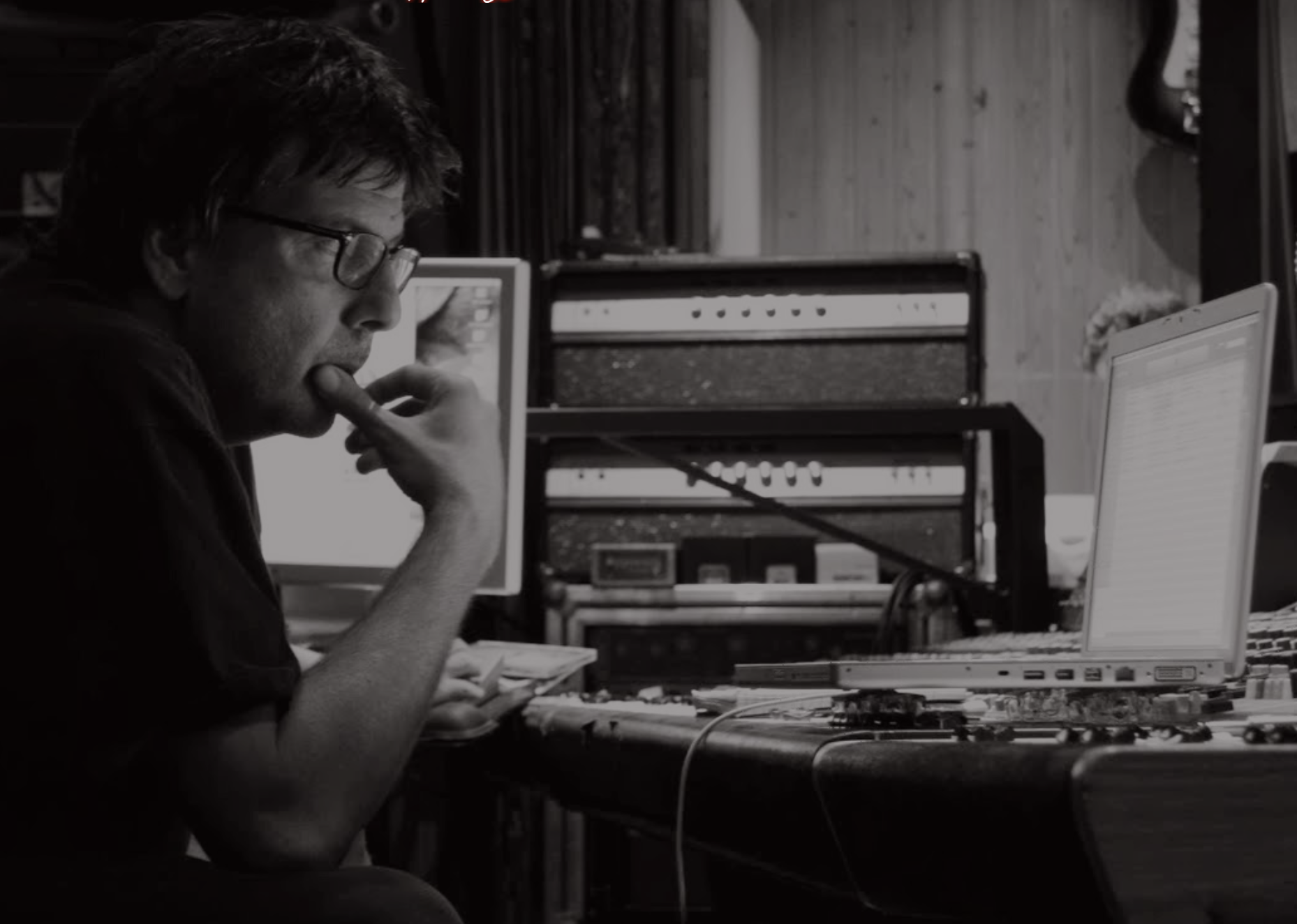
- Benson in 2017

Background information
- Born: Howard Michael Benson; July 20, 1956 (age 70); Havertown, Pennsylvania, U.S.
- Genres: Rock; heavy metal; pop; pop rock; pop punk; emo; glam metal; punk rock; post-grunge; hard rock; country
- Occupation: Record producer
- Instrument: Keyboards
- Years active: 1986–present
- Label: Judge & Jury
- Website: howardbenson.com

Howard Michael Benson (born July 20, 1956) is an American record producer from Havertown, Pennsylvania. He has been nominated for two Grammy Awards for Producer of the Year, Non-Classical in 2007 and 2008, among two wins and 16 total nominations for his productions. He is also the co-founder of the American record label Judge & Jury Records, alongside Three Days Grace drummer Neil Sanderson.

== Early life and education ==
Benson was born and raised in a middle-class family in greater Philadelphia, the son of Estelle and Robert Benson. He is Jewish. He began playing keyboards in rock bands at the age of 13. He attended college at Drexel University and studied engineering. During his years at Drexel, Benson took a year off and studied composition at the Philadelphia College for Performing Arts. Benson graduated from Drexel with a degree in materials engineering. After graduation, he moved to Los Angeles and worked for Garrett AiResearch, where he worked on aircraft such as C-5s and F-18s.

At the time of his graduation, he regularly played with his band in small Hollywood clubs, and when his band finally went into the studio with a producer, Benson was inspired to become a record producer.

He returned to Drexel in 2010 to create and teach the advanced production class at Drexel University's Antoinette Westphal College of Media Arts and Design. In 2011, he established the Howard and Monica Benson Endowed Scholarship Fund for students enrolled at the Antoinette Westphal College of Media Arts and Design. In 2015, he received an honorary degree from Drexel University.

== Career ==
His first works as producer were two albums for hardcore punk band T.S.O.L. (Revenge (1986) and Hit and Run (1987)), and the first record he produced for a major record label was Bang Tango's Psycho Café in 1989. Benson states that discovering Pro Tools in 1998 while working with Sepultura was a major turning point in his career. He was asked to produce P.O.D.'s The Fundamental Elements of Southtown album in 1999, which became a platinum-selling record. In 2000, Benson produced P.O.D.'s multi-platinum-selling Satellite at Bay 7 Studios, and continued to record numerous albums at that location. Over the next few years, Benson produced records from acts like Cold, Crazy Town, P.O.D.'s Payable on Death, and Three Cheers for Sweet Revenge from My Chemical Romance. He later produced numerous multi-platinum records for artists such as The All-American Rejects, Hoobastank, Flyleaf, Daughtry, Seether, Saosin, Theory of a Deadman, Three Days Grace, Skillet, Santana, Adam Lambert, My Chemical Romance, Kelly Clarkson and Papa Roach.

He now produces exclusively at West Valley Recording Studios, in Woodland Hills.

Benson stated that he utilizes Auto-Tune in the studio and that those who do not are "nuts". Benson prefers to record in what he calls a "parallel system," in which musicians will record their parts in isolated rooms. After the recording of an album, Benson typically brings the track to his home studio, Sparky Dark Studios, where he personally adds to the arrangement.

Benson has worked as an A&R consultant at Giant Records, Elektra Records, and Warner Bros. Records.

Benson produced and appears in Attack of Life: The Bang Tango Movie, which is a 2016 documentary film directed by Drew Fortier about 80s hard rock band Bang Tango for whom Benson had produced two albums.

In 2021 Benson and Three Days Grace drummer Neil Sanderson co-founded the record label Judge & Jury Records.

In addition to his album production work, Benson has expanded into audio-software and music-education projects. He collaborated with Joey Sturgis Tones to release the signature vocal-processing plugins Howard Benson Vocals and Howard Benson Vocal Multiplier. He also partnered with STL Tones to develop STL Tonality: Howard Benson, a guitar-amp and effects plugin suite.

Benson has also appeared in educational media, including serving as the featured instructor for the URM Academy course How It’s Done, which documents his production process in collaboration with the band In Flames.

== Discography ==
Benson has served as a producer for numerous musical acts, including Saosin, Hoobastank, Seether, Three Days Grace, My Chemical Romance, P.O.D., Escape the Fate, and Daughtry.

== Awards ==
=== ARIA Awards ===
Year	Nominee / work	Award	Result
2005	"Thrills, Kills & Sunday Pills"	Best Rock Album	Won

=== Grammy Awards ===
Year	Nominee / work	Award	Result
2001	"Alive"	Best Metal Performance	Nominated
2002	"Youth of the Nation"	Best Hard Rock Performance	Nominated
2002	"Portrait"	Best Metal Performance	Nominated
2005	The Reason	Best Pop Vocal Album	Nominated
2005	"The Reason"	Best Pop Performance by a Duo or Group with Vocals	Nominated
2007	Himself	Producer of the Year, Non-Classical	Nominated
2007	Daughtry	Best Rock Album	Nominated
2007	"It's Not Over"	Best Rock Song	Nominated
2007	"Home"	Best Pop Performance by a Duo or Group with Vocals	Nominated
2007	"It's Not Over"	Best Rock Performance by a Duo or Group with Vocals	Nominated
2008	Himself	Producer of the Year, Non-Classical	Nominated
2010	All I Ever Wanted	Best Pop Vocal Album	Nominated
2010	"Born Again"	Best Gospel Performance	Nominated
2010	"Born Again"	Best Gospel Song	Nominated
2013	Stronger	Best Pop Vocal Album	Won
2013	"Love Bites (So Do I)"	Best Hard Rock/Metal Performance	Won

=== GMA Dove Awards ===
Year	Nominee / work	Award	Result
2005	The Passion of the Christ: Songs	Special Event Album of the Year	Won
2009	Revelation	Pop/Contemporary Album of the Year	Won
2010	Awake	Rock Album of the Year	Nominated
2010	"Hero"	Rock Song of the Year	Nominated
2011	Memento Mori	Rock Album of the Year	Nominated
2011	"One Day Too Late"	Rock Song of the Year	Nominated
2011	"Lucy"	Rock Song of the Year	Nominated
2013	New Horizons	Rock Album of the Year	Nominated
2013	Release the Panic	Rock Album of the Year	Won
2013	"Sick of It"	Rock Song of the Year	Won
2013	"Who We Are"	Rock Song of the Year	Nominated
2013	"Perfect Life"	Rock Song of the Year	Nominated
2013	"Strike Back"	Rock Song of the Year	Nominated
2014	Rise	Rock Album of the Year	Won
2014	Release the Panic: Recalibrated	Rock Album of the Year	Nominated
2014	"Not Gonna Die"	Rock Song of the Year	Won
2014	"Die For You"	Rock Song of the Year	Nominated
2014	"Run and Escape"	Rock Song of the Year	Nominated
2014	"Zombie"	Rock Song of the Year	Nominated
2015	"Good to Be Alive"	Rock Song of the Year	Won
2015	"Dead Man"	Rock Song of the Year	Nominated

== Products ==
In 2017 Howard Benson partnered with audio plug-in developer STL Tones to create the Howard Benson - Producer Kemper Pack and in 2018 they released STL Tonality - Howard Benson Guitar Plug-In Suite. In 2020 Howard partnered with Joey Sturgis Tones and released his signature vocals plugin, Howard Benson Vocals. In 2022, Howard partnered with Joey Sturgis Tones again and released his signature voice generation plug-in, the Howard Benson Vocal Multiplier.

Software	Function	Release date
Howard Benson - Producer Kemper Pack	Amplifier Emulator for Kemper Amps	2017
STL Tonality - Howard Benson Guitar Plug-In Suite	Amplifier Emulator for DAWs	2018
Howard Benson Vocals by JST	Vocal Chain for DAWs	2020
Howard Benson Vocal Multiplier	Voice Generation Plug-In for DAWs	2022
