= Rated X (disambiguation) =

X rating is a motion picture rating for content deemed suitable only for adults.

Rated X may also refer to:

- "Rated "X"", a 1972 song by Loretta Lynn and covered by the White Stripes
- "Rated X", a song by Spiritualized from their 2003 album Amazing Grace
- Rated X (album), a 1995 album by Deranged
- Rated X (film), a 2000 film

== See also ==
- Rated R (disambiguation)
