= Lie to Me (Denial) =

Single by Red

from the album Until We Have Faces
- Released: July 7, 2011
- Recorded: 2010
- Genre: Christian metal; hard rock
- Length: 4:13
- Label: Essential; Sony
- Songwriters: Red; Rob Graves; Jasen Rauch; Mark Holman
- Producer: Rob Graves

Red singles chronology
"Not Alone" (2011)	"Lie to Me (Denial)" (2011)	"Who We Are" (2012)

Music video
- "Lie to Me (Denial)" on YouTube

"Lie to Me (Denial)" (written as "Denial (Lie to Me)" on Who We Are: The RED Anthology) is the fourth single by the American Christian rock band Red on their third full-length studio album Until We Have Faces. The song was written by Anthony Armstrong, Joe Rickard, Rob Graves, Jasen Rauch, and Mark Holman.

This song was responsible for putting Red into Loudwire's Cage Match Hall of Fame as the first member for out-popularizing Skillet's "It's Not Me, It's You", Black Tide's "That Fire", Black Stone Cherry's "Blame It on the Boom Boom", Seether's "Tonight", and Nickelback's "Bottoms Up" in five "Cage Matches", a contest which songs earn votes over a period of a day.

== Style ==
The song is one of the heavier songs on its album, but less than the second single "Feed the Machine". AudioInkRadio wrote that "'Lie to Me (Denial)' opens with an eerie instrumental passage, pierced with subtle electronic beats and warm guitar tones, before exploding into crushing riffs and towering melodies."

== Lyrics and meaning ==
The song is apparently about denial and refutation. An AudioInkRadio editor wrote of the song: "Haven't you ever wanted someone to just lie to you, instead of getting the truth? That's what this song is about."

== Song location ==
It was filmed inside the Sloss Furnace National Historic Landmark in Birmingham, AL.

== Charts ==
Chart (2011)	Peak position
US Mainstream Rock (Billboard)	30
