= The War We Made =

2020 song by Red

Single by Red

from the album Declaration
- Released: March 13, 2020
- Genre: Christian metal, hard rock
- Length: 3:52
- Label: Red Entertainment, The Fuel
- Songwriters: Anthony Armstrong, Rob Graves
- Producer: Rob Graves

Red singles chronology
| "All for You" (2020) | "The War We Made" (2020) | "Surrogates" (2023) |

Music videos
- "The War We Made" on YouTube
- "The War We Made" (performance video) on YouTube

"The War We Made" is the fifth single by the American Christian rock band Red on their album Declaration. It was released on March 13, 2020. On the same day, the band posted a music video depicting a live performance of the song. Later, on January 15, 2021, a performance video was posted to YouTube, portraying the band playing the song.

== Themes and composition ==
Regarding the song's meaning, Anthony Armstrong said it "talks about our innate ability as humans to cause destruction in our own lives. A lot of the time, we don't even realize that we ourselves are the source of the pain. And if we want to see a change brought about, it's a fight that we have to be willing to win."

== Reception ==
Chad Childers and Jake Richardson of Loudwire called the song one of the best of 2020, saying "The song is a soaring piece, building in intensity to the chorus until Michael Barnes delivers the power vocal that expresses the angst at its height."

== Charts ==
| Chart (2020) | Peak position |
|---|---|
| US Hot Christian Songs (Billboard) | 48 |
| US Mainstream Rock (Billboard) | 34 |
