= R rating =

R rating may refer to:

- R rating, a rating of the Canadian Home Video Rating System
- R rating, a rating of the Korea Media Rating Board
- R rating (Motion Picture Association), a rating of the US Motion Picture Association film rating system
- Restricted ratings of the Movie and Television Review and Classification Board in the Philippines
- Restricted ratings of the Office of Film and Literature Classification in New Zealand
- R18 (British Board of Film Classification), a rating by the British Board of Film Classification usually signifying hardcore pornography
- R18+, a rating of the Australian Classification Board
- R18 rating, a rating of Eirin in Japan

== See also ==
- 18 rating
- M for Mature
- Mature content
- R. Rated
- R-value (disambiguation)
- R18 (disambiguation)
- Rated R (disambiguation)
