= Unstoppable (Sia song) =

2016 single by Sia

Single by Sia

from the album This Is Acting
- Released: 18 July 2022
- Recorded: 2015
- Genre: Electropop
- Length: 3:37
- Label: Monkey Puzzle; RCA
- Songwriters: Sia Furler; Christopher Braide
- Producer: Jesse Shatkin

Sia singles chronology
"Dynamite" (2022)	"Unstoppable" (2022)	"Gimme Love" (2023)

Live video
- Unstoppable (Live from the Nostalgic For The Present Tour) on YouTube

"Unstoppable" is a song by Australian singer-songwriter Sia, taken from her seventh studio album This Is Acting (2016). The song was written by Sia and Christopher Braide, and produced by Jesse Shatkin. It was released as the album's final promotional single on 21 January 2016. In July 2016, a new version of the song was made for Gillette's 2016 Olympic ad campaign, "Pretty Isn't Perfect", which features a verse from American rapper Pusha T.

In 2022, the song was released to radio as an official single in the United States after gaining popularity through commercials and video-sharing app TikTok. Unstoppable reached one billion streams on Spotify at the end of 2023, becoming the 3rd Sia song to achieve this.

At the APRA Music Awards of 2024, the song won Most Performed Australian Work Overseas.

== Composition ==
"Unstoppable" is the fifth track on Sia's 2016 album This Is Acting. It has been called a "stomping, empowering jam" and "swollen self-esteem anthem of her", with lyrics like, "I'm unstoppable, I'm a Porsche with no brakes / I'm invincible, I win every single game / I'm so powerful I don't need batteries to play / I'm so confident yeah I'm unstoppable today."

== Release and commercial use ==
Sia debuted "Unstoppable" as a promotional single on 20 January 2016, days before the album's 29 January release date. The song marked the sixth used to promote the album prior to its release. Major League Baseball used the song to promote the 2016 postseason as well as highlights.

In 2019, the song was used in the commercial for the Lancôme Idôle fragrance, which starred Zendaya. In 2022, "Unstoppable" was featured in a commercial for the Samsung Galaxy S22 Ultra.

== Reception ==
"Unstoppable" has received mostly positive critical reception, with most reviewers commenting on its theme of empowerment. Jessie Morris of Complex commented that the song sounds like a "page torn right out of Demi Lovato's Confident book", while editors of other media platforms like Idolator noticed this as well, which raised speculation that the track was intentionally written for Lovato. Billboard's Jessica Katz said the song is reminiscent of work by Rihanna and "clearly follows in the lineage of emotional barn-burners that have become [Sia's] trademark". Michelle Lulic of Bustle said its lyrics "make it clear is the female empowerment anthem you had no idea you were missing from your life. Seriously, if you need a song to get you through the rest of the work week... and this is the song you've been waiting for." Furthermore, Lulic wrote, "While ... the song was not initially written for [Sia], it certainly doesn't take away from [her] ability to handle the powerful ballad and catchy lyrics. Because, honestly, if it was Rihanna, Adele, or even Katy Perry singing this song, it still wouldn't lose its powerful message."

MTV's Emilee Lindner said it "encourages those who are feeling weak to put their armor on". Furthermore, she wrote, "The song seems like it's taking the message from her previously released track, 'Alive', and giving it a boost. Instead of just surviving, she's going to prove to people that she's going to succeed, and she's going to look good doing it." Daniel Kreps of Rolling Stone called the song "triumphant", with a "fist-pumping, wall-smashing" chorus. Stereogum's Tom Breiham, who wrote about the song after its debut but before This Is Acting's release, guessed that Sia wrote "Unstoppable" with a recording artist like Katy Perry in mind. He compared the song to the work of Florence and the Machine.

== Commercial performance ==
On the Billboard Hot 100, the song debuted at number 98 six years after being released and peaked at number 28, becoming Sia's eighth top 40 hit on the chart. Unstoppable has charted in the top five of Adult Contemporary for a record 84 weeks, all consecutively since the ranking dated Oct. 8, 2022. In 2024, Unstoppable becomes the 4th song in history to spend 100 non-consecutive weeks on @billboard's Adult Contemporary Chart.

Unstoppable reached one billion streams on Spotify at the end of 2023, becoming the 3rd Sia song to achieve this.

== Track listing ==
Digital download – The Remixes

1. "Unstoppable" (Clarence Clarity remix) – 3:47
2. "Unstoppable" – 3:37
3. "Unstoppable" (R3Hab remix) – 2:42
4. "Unstoppable" (Slowed & Reverb) – 4:12
5. "Unstoppable" (Sped up) – 3:17

== Charts ==
=== Weekly charts ===
2016–2017 weekly chart performance for "Unstoppable"
Chart (2016–2017)	Peak position
Australia (ARIA)	115
Austria (Ö3 Austria Top 40)	35
Belarus Airplay (Eurofest)	139
Canada Hot 100 (Billboard)	88
France (SNEP)	23
Germany (GfK)	62
Portugal (AFP)	83
ERROR in "Russia": Unknown chart "Russia".
Sweden (Sverigetopplistan)	94
Switzerland (Schweizer Hitparade)	26
Ukraine Airplay (Tophit)	10

2019–2022 weekly chart performance for "Unstoppable"
Chart (2019–2023)	Peak position
Belgium (Ultratop 50 Flanders)	21
Belgium (Ultratop 50 Wallonia)	10
Canada Hot 100 (Billboard)	29
Canada AC (Billboard)	2
Canada CHR/Top 40 (Billboard)	38
Canada Hot AC (Billboard)	5
Czech Republic Airplay (ČNS IFPI)	13
Euro Digital Songs (Billboard)	8
France Downloads (SNEP)	2
Global 200 (Billboard)	79
Greece Airplay (IFPI)	2
Greece Digital Songs (Billboard)	4
Hungary (Rádiós Top 40)	9
Hungary (Single Top 40)	5
Iceland (Tónlistinn)	20
India International Singles (IMI)	6
Netherlands (Single Tip)	6
Scottish Singles Sales (Official Charts)	19
Slovakia Airplay (ČNS IFPI)	4
Switzerland (Media Control Romandy)	3
US Billboard Hot 100	28
US Adult Contemporary (Billboard)	1
US Adult Pop Airplay (Billboard)	1
US Pop Airplay (Billboard)	12
Vietnam (Vietnam Hot 100)	67

=== Year-end charts ===
2016 year-end chart performance for "Unstoppable"
Chart (2016)	Position
CIS (Tophit)	13
Russia Airplay (Tophit)	8
Ukraine Airplay (Tophit)	122

2020 year-end chart performance for "Unstoppable"
Chart (2020)	Position
Belgium (Ultratop Flanders)	44
Belgium (Ultratop Wallonia)	49
Hungary (Rádiós Top 40)	77

2022 year-end chart performance for "Unstoppable"
Chart (2022)	Position
Canada (Canadian Hot 100)	93
Global 200 (Billboard)	115
Hungary (Rádiós Top 40)	48
Hungary (Single Top 40)	49
Switzerland (Schweizer Hitparade)	46
US Adult Contemporary (Billboard)	11
US Adult Top 40 (Billboard)	14
US Digital Song Sales (Billboard)	16
US Radio Songs (Billboard)	40

2023 year-end chart performance for "Unstoppable"
Chart (2023)	Position
Australian Artist (ARIA)	15
Global 200 (Billboard)	69
Hungary (Rádiós Top 40)	61
Switzerland (Schweizer Hitparade)	30
US Adult Contemporary (Billboard)	1
US Adult Top 40 (Billboard)	13

2024 year-end chart performance for "Unstoppable"
Chart (2024)	Position
US Adult Contemporary (Billboard)	4

== Certifications ==
Certifications for "Unstoppable"
Region	Certification	Certified units/sales
Belgium (BRMA)	Gold	20,000^{‡}
Denmark (IFPI Danmark)	Platinum	90,000^{‡}
France (SNEP)	Diamond	333,333^{‡}
Germany (BVMI)	Platinum	400,000^{‡}
Italy (FIMI)	2× Platinum	200,000^{‡}
New Zealand (RMNZ)	4× Platinum	120,000^{‡}
Poland (ZPAV)	Diamond	250,000^{‡}
Portugal (AFP)	3× Platinum	30,000^{‡}
Spain (Promusicae)	2× Platinum	120,000^{‡}
United Kingdom (BPI)	Platinum	600,000^{‡}
United States (RIAA)	3× Platinum	3,000,000^{‡}
^{‡} Sales+streaming figures based on certification alone.

== Cover version ==
The Christian rock band Red included a cover of Unstopable on their 2017 album Gone It was released to Christan rock radio in 2018 & reached number 2 on Billboard's Christan rock airplay chart. An accompanying music video was released.
