= Faceless (song) =

Single by Red

from the album Until We Have Faces
- Released: December 31, 2010
- Recorded: 2010
- Genre: Christian rock; alternative metal; nu metal
- Length: 3:22 (album version); 3:14 (radio edit)
- Label: Essential; Sony
- Songwriters: Red; Rob Graves
- Producer: Rob Graves

Red singles chronology
"Ordinary World" (2010)	"Faceless" (2010)	"Feed the Machine" (2011)

Music video
- "Faceless" (fan video) on YouTube

"Faceless" is a song by American Christian rock band Red. It was released in December 2010 as the first single from their studio album Until We Have Faces. The song was also used in the compilation album WOW Hits 2012.

== Background and meaning ==
Armstrong expanded on the song to NewReleaseTuesday: "It's basically the keystone of the whole record, the embodiment of what the whole record will be about finding identity. I think that this song is more about realization; you wake up one day and you find yourself be something that you never wanted to be. You find that the world has kind of gotten itself in your head and turned you into something that you were never really meant to be. This song is kind of about a person screaming out with that realization, I'm hollow and faceless. I need to do something about this."

== Track listing ==
Promotional single
No.	Title	Writer(s)	Length
1.	"Faceless (radio edit)"	Anthony Armstrong; Michael Barnes; Randy Armstrong; Joe Rickard; Jason McArthur; Jasen Rauch	3:14
2.	"Faceless (album version)"	Anthony Armstrong; Michael Barnes; Randy Armstrong; Joe Rickard; Jason McArthur; Jasen Rauch	3:22

== Charts ==
Chart (2011)	Peak position
US Hot Christian Songs (Billboard)	29
US Rock Digital Songs (Billboard)	43

== Awards ==
The song was nominated for "Rock/Contemporary Recorded Song of the Year".
