= Rated R =

Rated R refers to movies (and also to TV shows and video games in certain systems) that have been given a "restricted" rating according to one of the following film rating systems or classification boards:

- Australian Classification Board
- Canadian Home Video Rating System
- Motion Picture Association of America film rating system

Rated R may also refer to:

== Music ==
- Rated R (Queens of the Stone Age album), 2000
- Rated R (Rufa Mae Quinto album), 2002
- Rated R (Rihanna album), 2009
- Rated R, a 2023 album by Red
- Rated R, a 2026 album by from20
- "Rated R", a song by Ralph Tresvant
- "Rated R", a song by Redman
- "Reality Is Rated 'R'", a song by d.b.s. on the album If the Music's Loud Enough…
- "Rated R..." a song by American rock band The White Noise and Landon Tewers

== People ==
- "The Rated R", a rapper from Thug Life group
- "Rated-R Superstar", the nickname of Edge (wrestler)

== Other uses ==
- Rated R, an entertainment program aired on the radio station DYAB in the Philippines

== See also ==
- R rating (disambiguation)
