= Declaration (Red album) =

Studio album by Red
- Released: April 3, 2020
- Genre: Christian rock; Christian metal; hard rock; symphonic metal; nu metal
- Length: 38:11
- Label: Red Entertainment, The Fuel
- Producer: Rob Graves

Red chronology
Gone (2017)	Declaration (2020)	Rated R (2023)

Singles from Declaration
- 1. "The Evening Hate" Released: June 7, 2019; 2. "From the Ashes" Released: August 2, 2019; 3. "Sever" Released: January 17, 2020; 4. "All for You" Released: February 14, 2020; 5. "The War We Made" Released: March 13, 2020

Declaration is the seventh studio album by American Christian rock band Red. Originally scheduled for release on April 10, 2020, it was released on April 3, 2020 through the band's independent label Red Entertainment in collaboration with The Fuel Music and was produced by Rob Graves. It is the band's first release on these labels since their departure from Essential Records.

== Background and recording ==
After announcing the band would not be continuing their partnerships with Essential Records and Sony, they announced their future music would be independently funded, recorded, and released. They also announced that touring drummer Dan Johnson will join the band full-time as their fourth member. The band asked fans for support through GoFundMe and originally intended to not release another full-length studio project, focusing on singles and smaller portions of music made at a faster rate. After further thought and discussions with fans, the band decided to record and release a new album, while still utilizing the advantages of quicker music roll-outs that come with independence. The band's former drummer, Joe Rickard, acted as the mixing and mastering engineer on the album, as well as co-writing two songs.

== Release and promotion ==
The band posted an update, via a YouTube video on January 21, 2019. They announced that they are no longer signed to Essential/Sony and they will record their next album independently. They also announced that touring drummer Dan Johnson will join the band full-time as their fourth member, thus making a four-piece lineup since 2014. On June 7, the band released "The Evening Hate", their first new released music since leaving their record label.

After announcing a small run of 10th anniversary tour dates for Innocence & Instinct, the band released another single, "From the Ashes", accompanied by a lyric video, and announced more tour dates. On October 11, the band announced a new EP, The Evening Hate, that would precede a new studio album and would be released November 1, in addition to releasing a new single, "Hemorrhage", a cover of Fuel's song of the same name.

On January 10, 2020, the band announced that their upcoming seventh studio album titled Declaration is set for release on April 10, 2020. On March 25, the band announced that Declaration would be released a week earlier than its original April 10 release date.

== Reception ==
=== Critical reception ===
Professional ratings
Aggregate scores
Source	Rating
Album of The Year	75/100
Review scores
Source	Rating
AllMusic	Positive
Jesusfreakhideout.com	4.5/5 stars 3.5/5 stars
Rock 'N' Load	10/10
Today's Christian Entertainment	4.5/5 stars
Under the Radar	7/10 stars
The Cultured Nerd	A
CCM Magazine	3/5 stars
Sputnikmusic	4/5
The Heartland Attack	10/10

Declaration received critical acclaim; critics praised the band's return to form and the heavier side of the album, while some expressed disappointment that the album did not include any ballads, whereas all their previous releases did.

Jesus Freak Hideout rated the album 4.5 out of 5 stars and stated: "Declaration may just be a new standard for Red. An emotional ballad akin to 'Of These Chains' and 'Hymn for the Missing' would have been a welcome inclusion, but as it stands, this is quite easily the rock album to beat this year. Existing fans will be thrilled and it may even win over a few new converts. However you choose to listen, I highly recommend you do." In his review for Riff magazine, Max Heilman wrote, "These guys could have given in to trends, or at least laid off the classical element, but they know what works best for them. You can't help but buy into the emotional breadth Declaration lays out—from its heaviest breakdowns to the extravagant orchestral sonics—that lays it to rest. Without label constraints to hold it back, it's great to hear Red elevating the post-grunge and nu-metal far beyond expectation." Rock 'N' Load praised the album saying, "A stunning effort from the Nashville outfit, Declaration is an album that should be on everyone's radar. A stellar effort from RED could well be their finest recording to date."

=== Accolades ===
Year	Ceremony	Accolade	Result	Ref.
2021	We Love Christian Music Awards	The Amp Award (Rock/Alternative Album of the Year)	Nominated	

== Commercial performance ==
"The Evening Hate" peaked at No. 7 on Billboard's Christian Digital Song Sales, "From the Ashes" peaked at No. 15, and "Sever" peaked at No. 21.

== Track listing ==
All tracks are written by Anthony Armstrong and Rob Graves, except where noted.

Declaration track listing
No.	Title	Writer(s)	Length
1.	"All for You"	Anthony Armstrong, Rob Graves	3:06
2.	"Infidel"	A. Armstrong, Graves	4:03
3.	"Cauterize"	A. Armstrong, Graves	3:46
4.	"The War We Made"	A. Armstrong, Graves	3:52
5.	"The Evening Hate" (re-recorded version; original version from The Evening Hate EP)	A. Armstrong, Randy Armstrong, Graves	4:47
6.	"Float"	A. Armstrong, Graves	3:06
7.	"The Victim"	A. Armstrong, Graves, Joe Rickard	3:00
8.	"Sever"	A. Armstrong, Graves, Keith Wallen	4:02
9.	"Only Fight"	A. Armstrong, Graves, Rickard	3:02
10.	"From the Ashes" (re-recorded version; original version from The Evening Hate EP)	A. Armstrong, Graves	5:23
Total length:			38:11

== Personnel ==
Credits adapted from Tidal.

Red

- Michael Barnes – lead vocals
- Anthony Armstrong – guitars, backing vocals, strings, programming
- Randy Armstrong – bass, backing vocals, piano
- Dan Johnson – drums

Additional personnel

- Rob Graves – strings, programming
- Joe Rickard – programming
- David Davidson – strings, violin
- Kristin Wilkinson – viola
- David Angell – violin
- Carole Rabinowitz – cello
- Igor Khoroshev – programming
- Alex Niceforo – programming
- Christopher Kornmann – art direction & design

Production

- Rob Graves – production
- Anthony Armstrong – assistant production
- Joe Rickard – mixing, mastering
- Mike Plotnikoff – engineer
- Dave Hagan – engineer
- Gavin Mellberg – engineer
- Taylor Pollert – string engineer
- Michael Closson III – engineer
- Paul DeCarli – digital editing

Management

- Tony Patoto – A&R
- Chris Bradstreet – A&R, executive producer

== Charts ==
Declaration chart performance
Chart (2020)	Peak position
US Billboard 200	61
US Top Christian Albums (Billboard)	2
US Independent Albums (Billboard)	8
US Top Alternative Albums (Billboard)	4
US Top Hard Rock Albums (Billboard)	3
US Top Rock Albums (Billboard)	6
