= Release the Panic =

2013 studio album by Red

Studio album by Red
- Released: February 5, 2013
- Recorded: August – November 2012
- Studios: NRG Studios, North Hollywood, California; West Valley Studios, Woodland Hills, California
- Genres: Post-grunge, Christian metal
- Length: 33:58
- Labels: Essential, Sony
- Producer: Howard Benson

Red chronology
Until We Have Faces (2011)	Release the Panic (2013)	of Beauty and Rage (2015)

Singles from Release the Panic
- 1. "Perfect Life" Released: January 8, 2013; 2. "Release the Panic" Released: January 29, 2013; 3. "Hold Me Now" Released: June 3, 2013; 4. "Die for You" Released: September 3, 2013; 5. "So Far Away" Released: December 31, 2013; 6. "The Moment We Come Alive" Released: 2014

Release the Panic is the fourth studio album by American Christian rock band Red. It was released on February 5, 2013 through Essential Records and Sony Music. It was produced by Howard Benson. The first song released from the album, "Release the Panic," was released on Friday, November 9, 2012 on their official VEVO channel on YouTube. The first single from the album, "Perfect Life," was released on November 29, 2012 on their official VEVO channel on YouTube.

== Background ==
In mid-2012, Red mentioned that they would be returning to the studio to record their fourth album. In the latter part of the year, more information about recording was posted on their official Facebook page. Over the months that followed, the band posted different teasers of recording the album in the studio.

In October and November 2012, the band published broadcasts that revealed information regarding the new album. The first broadcast revealed the name of the album. The second broadcast revealed a brand new photo of the band. The third broadcast revealed a sample of a new song from the album. The fourth broadcast was released on November 29 that revealed the album artwork.

On November 9, 2012, Red posted the official lyric video for "Release the Panic" on their official VEVO channel on YouTube. On November 27, "Perfect Life" was streamed online and on November 30, the lyric video for the song had been released. On December 20, 2012 Red posted the lyric video for the track "Hold Me Now."

A "deluxe edition" of the album as released, including two previously unreleased songs, one of which charted at 48 on the Billboard Christian Digital chart. It also included three remixes from the band's previously released albums.

== Reception ==
=== Commercial ===
Release the Panic debuted on the U.S. Billboard 200 chart at No. 7, with first week sales of around 41,000. The debut position is five spots lower than the band's previous release, Until We Have Faces, which debuted at No. 2 in February 2011. It sold fewer than roughly 1,000 copies less than the previous release, or 1.77% lower sales.

As of April 10, 2013, the album has sold over 100,000 copies in the U.S.

=== Critical ===
Professional ratings
Aggregate scores
Source	Rating
Album of The Year	70/100
Review scores
Source	Rating
About.com	4/5 stars
AllMusic	3.5/5 stars
CCM Magazine	4/5 stars
Cross Rhythms	7/10 squares
Evigshed Magazine	5/5 stars
HM	3/5 stars
Indie Vision Music	3/5 stars
Jesusfreakhideout.com	3.5/5 stars
New Release Tuesday	5/5 stars
The Phantom Tollbooth	3.5/5 stars
Worship Leader	4/5 stars

The album has achieved generally favorable reviews from the ten reviews that have been written. Release the Panic has garnered positive reviews from the following publications: About.com, AllMusic, CCM Magazine, Christian Music Review, Cross Rhythms, Evigshed Magazine, Jesus Freak Hideout's Bert Gangl and Kevin Hoskins, New Release Tuesday and Worship Leader. However, the album has received one mixed review from Indie Vision Music.

The most glowing review was a five-star perfect rating from Kevin Davis of New Release Tuesday, which he evoked how "RED’s fourth project Release the Panic, has knocked it out of the park with their best overall album. I’m truly a fan of this band and I can’t get enough of their emotive hard rock. Even if you don’t normally listen to hard rock albums, the artistic nature of these songs draws you in and elicits an emotional response. The messages throughout many of the songs are very positive and although RED has had mainstream success, I don’t question the spiritual seeking nature of the lyrics, which are naturally much more Christ-centered than mainstream metal bands like Linkin Park that many have accurately compared to RED." The second five-star perfect rating came from Evigshed Magazine, who highlighted the album as "a heavy rock album mixed with many industrial sounds and pop elements".

The album got three four-star reviews from About.com, CCM Magazine and Worship Leader. About.com's Kim Jones wrote that "bottom line" is that "RED rocks it hard, eases up a bit and rocks it soft and then goes for fun with remixes of songs from past hit albums. The diversity is there, every where you turn as is the message. No need to panic folks" Matt Conner of CCM Magazine affirmed that "Release the Panic lives up to the hype. The band worked with super-producer Howard Benson to craft an explosive package that's both intense yet insightful." In addition, Worship Leader's Darryl Bryant found that "Release the Panic is unapologetically Metal Rock and having interviewed many teenagers and youth leaders, this CD hits them right between the eyes and challenges the listener to look deeply at the world they live in and make sense of it." Bryant wrote that "After first blush, Release the Panic is not just a statement but also an indictment on the sinner and complacent alike." Christian Music Review's April Covington rated the album 3.7-out-of-five, and vowed that "Release the Panic is an amazing album that satisfies."

Release the Panic got three three-and-a-half-stars-out-of-five from AllMusic, both of the Jesus Freak Hideout reviews and The Phantom Tollbooth. First, AllMusic's Steve Leggett illustrated how the "Mixing a post-grunge sound, complete with a slight metal edge, and a radio-ready studio sheen, Red play songs that, although they're often filled with confusion, despair, and anger, are also ultimately positive and redemptive". In addition, Leggett alluded to how the album "doesn't mess with the formula very much, and if they sound like Linkin Park, say, or Chevelle, that firm faith in hope and redemption gives the band a kind of spiritual warmth not always apparent at first listen." Jesus Freak Hideout's Bert Gangl called the album a "bi-polar approach", but did proclaim that "Release the Panic nevertheless earns its creators high marks for their willingness to shake up the established order a bit. More importantly, though, its stronger entries offer convincing hints that the group's next release may well turn out to be its defining work." Kevin Hoskins delivered the second opinion for the publication, and noted how "There's nothing new here as the Release the Panic keeps pace with exactly what Red has been known for, and while that music is good, it again fails to live up to the aforementioned hype." Moreover, Hoskins portends that "Release the Panic will probably be known as one of the better rock albums of 2013, but likely will not land a spot on many greatest albums lists." Also Gangl wrote an entirely different review for The Phantom Tollbooth, and found that "Dyed-in-the-wool metal heads will probably view Panic’s ballads with the same contempt they heaped upon the better part of the Faces record. And, truth be told, the softer offerings on Panic, thanks to their sometimes overly generic character, sail wide of the mark as often as they hit it. In the same way, even on the most infectiously catchy tunes, the band's lyrics are often similarly undistinguished. Taken in the context of the release as a whole, though, the duff balladry is kept to a pleasantly bare minimum. And the groove-intensive nature of the mostly impressive heavier fare easily offsets the better portion of its word-related shortfalls." Cross Rhythms' Tony Cummings rated the album seven-stars-out-of-ten, and called found that the release "contains some excellent cuts."

However, the album has received two mixed reviews from HM and Indie Vision Music, and those are three-star ratings out of five. At HM, Kim Flanders evoked that the "production is over-polished", yet "this release is perhaps a step up musically from previous deliveries." Indie Vision Music's Lee Brown on the deluxe edition surmised that "Release the Panic is neither a masterpiece, nor is it deplorable...Release the Panic has some really solid moments."

== Release the Panic: Recalibrated ==
Release the Panic: Recalibrated

EP by Red
- Released: April 29, 2014
- Length: 26:30
- Labels: Essential, Sony
- Producers: Howard Benson, Rob Graves

Red chronology
Not Alone (Performance Tracks) (2011)	Release the Panic: Recalibrated (2014)	The Evening Hate (2019)

Release the Panic: Recalibrated is an EP by American Christian rock band Red. The EP was released on April 29, 2014, through Essential Records and Sony Music. It is a remix extended play with six tracks from the original album with new elements such as orchestral arrangements, and a new song called "Run and Escape" as the opening track. It is the last project of the band before the departure of their long-time drummer, Joe Rickard.

The EP reached No. 75 on the Billboard 200 charts, while also appearing on the US Rock, US Indie, US Christian and US Hard Rock charts.

== Track listing ==
Standard Edition
No.	Title	Writer(s)	Length
1.	"Release the Panic"	Anthony Armstrong, Michael Barnes, Randy Armstrong, Joe Rickard, Jasen Rauch, Jason McArthur	3:02
2.	"Perfect Life"	A. Armstrong, Barnes, R. Armstrong, Rickard, Rauch, McArthur, Johnny Andrews	2:52
3.	"Die for You"	A. Armstrong, Barnes, R. Armstrong, Rickard, McArthur	2:47
4.	"Damage"	A. Armstrong, Barnes, R. Armstrong, Rickard, Hunter Lamb, McArthur	3:42
5.	"Same Disease"	A. Armstrong, Barnes, R. Armstrong, Rickard, McArthur, Andrews	3:02
6.	"Hold Me Now"	A. Armstrong, Barnes, R. Armstrong, Rickard, Rauch, David Hodges	4:01
7.	"If We Only"	A. Armstrong, Barnes, R. Armstrong, Rickard, Rauch, McArthur, Mark Holman	3:47
8.	"So Far Away"	A. Armstrong, Barnes, R. Armstrong, Rickard, Rauch, Andrews	3:56
9.	"Glass House"	A. Armstrong, Barnes, R. Armstrong, Rickard, Rauch, McArthur, Josh Baker	3:33
10.	"The Moment We Come Alive"	A. Armstrong, Barnes, R. Armstrong, Rickard, McArthur, Baker	3:23
Total length:			33:58

Deluxe Edition
No.	Title	Writer(s)	Length
11.	"Love Will Leave a Mark"	A. Armstrong, Barnes, R. Armstrong, Rickard, Andrews, Holman	2:41
12.	"As You Go"	A. Armstrong, Barnes, R. Armstrong, Rickard, Rauch, McArthur, Baker	4:17
13.	"Hymn for the Missing (Guillotine remix)"	Rob Graves, Rauch	4:34
14.	"Death of Me (Guillotine remix)"	Graves, Rauch	4:42
15.	"Breathe Into Me (Remix Acústica)"	A. Armstrong, McArthur, Rauch, Graves	3:55
Total length:			54:05

Release the Panic: Recalibrated
No.	Title	Writer(s)	Length
1.	"Run and Escape"	A. Armstrong, Barnes, R. Armstrong, Rickard, McArthur, Baker	4:04
2.	"Release the Panic" (Recalibrated)	A. Armstrong, Barnes, R. Armstrong, Rickard, Rauch, McArthur	3:27
3.	"Damage" (Recalibrated)	A. Armstrong, Barnes, R. Armstrong, Rickard, Lamb, McArthur	3:40
4.	"Hold Me Now" (Recalibrated)	A. Armstrong, Barnes, R. Armstrong, Rickard, Rauch, Hodges	3:54
5.	"So Far Away" (Recalibrated)	A. Armstrong, Barnes, R. Armstrong, Rickard, Rauch, Andrews	3:54
6.	"Glass House" (Recalibrated)	A. Armstrong, Barnes, R. Armstrong, Rickard, Rauch, McArthur, Baker	3:29
7.	"As You Go" (Recalibrated)	A. Armstrong, Barnes, R. Armstrong, Rickard, Rauch, McArthur, Baker	4:02
Total length:			26:30

== Personnel ==
Information gathered from the Release the Panic liner notes.

Red

- Michael Barnes – lead vocals
- Anthony Armstrong – lead and rhythm guitars, backing vocals, programming
- Randy Armstrong – bass, piano, backing vocals
- Joe Rickard – drums, additional programming

Production and recording

- Howard Benson – producer, mixing
- Mike Plotnikoff – mixing, audio engineer
- Jason McArthur – executive producer
- Hatsukazu "Hatch" Inagaki – additional engineer
- Paul DeCarli – additional engineer, digital editing
- Marc Vangool – guitar tech
- Jon Nicholson – drum tech at Drum Fetish
- NRG Recording, North Hollywood – recording location
- West Valley Studios, Woodland Hills, California – recording location, mixing location
- Ted Jensen – mastering at Sterling Sound, New York City
- Dan Bacigalupi – master compiled at Georgetown Masters, Nashville, Tennessee
- Andrew Mendelson – mastering (Recalibrated)
- Bobby Shin – string engineer (Recalibrated)
- Sean Anders – assistant engineer (Recalibrated)
- Anthony Martinez – assistant engineer (Recalibrated)

Additional musicians

- Howard Benson – keyboards, programming
- Paul DeCarli – additional programming
- Bernie Herms – string programming, string arrangements "If We Only"

Artwork and design

- Joseph Anthony Baker – photography
- Kelly Henderson – grooming
- Sheena Winiarski – wardrobe assistance
- Beth Lee – art direction
- Tim Parker – design, art direction
- Jason Root – A&R production

Release the Panic (Deluxe Edition) additional personnel

- Rob Graves – production, digital editing (15)
- Guillotine – production (13–14)
- Kerrie Roberts – vocals (13), backing vocals (6)
- Fred Paragano – digital editing (15)
- Milan Jilek – digital editing (15)

== Charts ==
Chart (2013)	Peak position
U.S. Billboard 200	7
U.S. Billboard Rock Albums	2
U.S. Billboard Hard Rock Albums	1
U.S. Billboard Alternative Albums	2
U.S. Billboard Digital Albums	7
U.S. Billboard Independent Albums	2
U.S. Billboard Christian Albums	1

=== Release the Panic: Recalibrated ===
Charts	Peak Position
U.S. Billboard 200	75
U.S. Billboard Rock Albums	23
U.S. Billboard Independent Albums	19
U.S. Billboard Christian Albums	8
U.S. Billboard Hard Rock Albums	5
