= L-value =

L-value, L value or lvalue may refer to:

- In astronomy, a measure of brightness of a lunar eclipse on the Danjon scale
- L-value (computer science), denoting an object to which values can be assigned
- In number theory, the value of an L-function
- In space physics, the value assigned to an L-shell, a particular set of planetary magnetic field lines

== See also ==
- R-value (disambiguation)
