= R-value =

R-value or rvalue may refer to:

- R-value (insulation) in building engineering, the efficiency of insulation of a house
- R-value (soils) in geotechnical engineering, the stability of soils and aggregates for pavement construction
- R-factor (crystallography), a measure of the agreement between the crystallographic model and the diffraction data
- R_{0} or R number, the basic reproduction number in epidemiology
- In computer science, a pure value which cannot be assigned to
- In statistics, the Pearson product-moment correlation coefficient, or simply correlation coefficient
- The Lankford coefficient, deformability of rolled sheet metal

== See also ==
- L-value (disambiguation)
- R rating (disambiguation)
- R-factor, a plasmid that codes for antibiotic resistance
- ASHRAE refrigerant designations, commonly known as R-numbers
