= Of Beauty and Rage =

of Beauty and Rage

Studio album by Red
- Released: February 24, 2015
- Studio: Little Big Sound, Nashville, Tennessee; The Graveyard Franklin, Tennessee; Dark Horse Studios, Franklin, Tennessee
- Genre: Alternative metal, alternative rock, Christian rock, symphonic metal
- Length: 60:34
- Label: Essential
- Producer: Rob Graves

Red chronology
Release the Panic (2013)	of Beauty and Rage (2015)	Gone (2017)

Singles from of Beauty and Rage
- 1. "Darkest Part" Released: December 8, 2014; 2. "Yours Again" Released: March 19, 2015

of Beauty and Rage is the fifth studio album by American Christian rock band Red. It was released on February 24, 2015 through Essential Records. It was produced by Rob Graves. The album was included through a PledgeMusic campaign. "Darkest Part" and "Yours Again" were available pre-release to backers. The album's first single "Darkest Part" was released on December 8, 2014. The album's second single, "Yours Again", was released on March 19, 2015. The album received highly positive reviews, with many citing it as the band's best album ever.

== Background ==
According to one of the twins, Anthony Armstrong, Red's guitarist, the song, "Darkest Part", is "simply about being vulnerable. When you trust someone and show the demons you have hidden away in your life, there is a fear and likelihood of scaring someone away." The story depicted in the music video ties in with past songs "Feed the Machine", "Release the Panic" and "Perfect Life". Together they form a larger storyline. At 60 minutes, it is the band's longest album to date.

== Critical reception ==
Professional ratings
Aggregate scores
Source	Rating
Album of the Year	74/100
Review scores
Source	Rating
AllMusic	Positive
CCM Magazine	4/5 stars
Christian Review	5/5 stars
Cross Rhythms	9/10 squares
Cryptic Rock	5/5 stars
Front Row Report	9/10
Indie Vision Music	4/5 stars
Jesusfreakhideout.com	4/5 stars 3.5/5 stars 4.5/5 stars 2.5/5 stars 3/5 stars
New Release Tuesday	4.5/5 stars
Sputnikmusic	3.7/5 stars 4.5/5 stars

Of Beauty and Rage received widespread acclaim; many critics have described it as the band's best album to date.

Lee Brown of Indie Vision Music praised the album, rating it four out of five stars, saying: "Red brings to the table their best album so far. of Beauty and Rage is subtle, yet powerful. It is heavy, yet tender. It weaves an eternal story of darkness to light that perfectly encapsulates both beauty and brutality. And, as with all of their work, the level of polish, skill, and craftsmanship is undeniable. Although I do not think it has quite overtaken Lil’ Dre’s amazing and personal Homework as best album so far this year… of Beauty and Rage is an album that will hold firm as one of the best albums of 2015."

Some critics believed the formulaic production would only be able to satisfy the band's fans, rather than being an innovative release. Writing for Jesus Freak Hideout, Michael Weaver also gave the album four out of five stars, although he claimed the album to be "formulaic", he concluded: "On the upside, some of the hardest music RED have written to date is present on this album. Also, Michael Barnes' screams are more on point, and more fully featured, than ever before. Sonically, of Beauty and Rage could be the band's finest work, but it seems the band needs to get away from the "go to" tracks to create some truly creative art. Long time RED listeners will likely fall in love with this one, but it's doubtful to sway anyone who has disregarded them in the past. It's a mixed bag of good music and frustration, but from the low start of "Descent" to the high of "Ascent," the story and concept here is worth at least one listen."

== Track listing ==
No.	Title	Writer(s)	Length
1.	"Descent"	Rob Graves	1:11
2.	"Impostor"	A. Armstrong, R. Armstrong, Barnes, Graves, Blue Stahli	4:18
3.	"Shadow and Soul"	A. Armstrong, R. Armstrong, Barnes, Graves	5:44
4.	"Darkest Part"	A. Armstrong, R. Armstrong, Barnes, Graves, J. Baker, Mark Holman	4:02
5.	"Fight to Forget"	A. Armstrong, R. Armstrong, Barnes, Graves, McArthur	3:28
6.	"Of These Chains"	A. Armstrong, R. Armstrong, Barnes, Graves	3:53
7.	"Falling Sky"	A. Armstrong, R. Armstrong, Barnes, Graves, J. Baker, Holman	5:26
8.	"The Forest"	Graves	0:55
9.	"Yours Again"	A. Armstrong, R. Armstrong, Barnes, Graves, McArthur, C. Flury, A. Niceforo	4:49
10.	"What You Keep Alive"	A. Armstrong, R. Armstrong, Barnes, Graves, Stahli	5:22
11.	"Gravity Lies"	A. Armstrong, R. Armstrong, Barnes, Graves	4:33
12.	"Take Me Over"	A. Armstrong, R. Armstrong, Barnes, Graves, McArthur, Baker, Johnny Andrews	3:51
13.	"The Ever"	A. Armstrong, R. Armstrong, Barnes, Graves, McArthur, Baker	4:10
14.	"Part That's Holding On"	A. Armstrong, R. Armstrong, Barnes, Graves, Baker	4:45
15.	"Ascent"	Graves	3:58
Total length:			60:34

== Personnel ==
Red

- Michael Barnes – vocals
- Anthony Armstrong – guitars, programming
- Randy Armstrong – bass, piano, vocals

Additional musicians

- Dan Johnson – drums
- David Davidson – violins
- David Angell – violins
- Conni Ellisor – violins
- Karen Winkelmann – violins
- Janet Darnall – violins
- Alicia Enstrom – violins
- Monisa Angell – violas
- Elizabeth Lamb – violas
- Seanad Dunigan Chang – violas
- Anthony LaMarchina – cellos
- Sarighani Reist – cellos
- Carole Rabinowitz – cellos
- Julie Tanner – cellos

Additional personnel

- Rob Graves – producer, piano, programming
- Jason McArthur – executive producer
- Jason Root – A&R Production
- Ben Grosse – mixing
- Paul Pavao – mix assistant
- Tom Baker at Baker Mastering – mastering
- Justin Spotswood – engineering
- Cason Pratt – engineering
- Bret Autrey (as Blue Stahli) – programming
- Josh Baker – programming
- Bobby "Baeho" Shin – orchestral engineer

== Charts ==
of Beauty and Rage debuted on the U.S. Billboard 200 chart at No. 14 with first week sales of over 34,000.

Chart (2015)	Peak position
US Billboard 200	14
US Top Alternative Albums (Billboard)	2
US Top Christian Albums (Billboard)	1
US Digital Albums (Billboard)	8
US Top Hard Rock Albums (Billboard)	1
US Independent Albums (Billboard)	1
US Top Rock Albums (Billboard)	3
