= Gone (Red album) =

Studio album by Red
- Released: October 27, 2017
- Recorded: Mid-2017
- Studio: Dark Horse Studios, Franklin, Tennessee
- Genre: Alternative metal; Christian rock; electronic rock; hard rock
- Length: 37:49
- Label: Essential
- Producer: Rob Graves

Red chronology
of Beauty and Rage (2015)	Gone (2017)	Declaration (2020)

Singles from Gone
- 1. "Losing Control" Released: September 22, 2017; 2. "Still Alive" Released: September 22, 2017; 3. "Gone" Released: October 13, 2017

Gone is the sixth studio album by American Christian rock band Red. It was released on October 27, 2017 through Essential Records. It was produced by Rob Graves. A 17-track digital deluxe edition is also available.

== Recording ==
In a March 2017 interview, guitarist Anthony Armstrong revealed the band, bassist and twin brother Randy Armstrong and singer Michael Barnes, were in the early stages of recording their sixth studio album. The sessions took place in the northeast US state of Maine, which is where their longtime producer Rob Graves lives and where their previous release, Of Beauty and Rage (2015), was also recorded. The location of the studio, surrounded by woods with wildlife, had a positive effect on the group and they agreed to return to record Gone with just Graves and themselves. By March 2017, the album's title had already been agreed upon by the band. Red took a break from recording in March 2017 to continue with the second half of their tour to commemorate the tenth anniversary of their debut album, End of Silence (2006).

Musically, Anthony noted that Gone continues the style of Red's previous albums as its approach is "alive and well", but wanted to avoid playing "the same four chords" as compared to other contemporary rock bands. Randy approached the album like the band was making its last, a thought he also had with each previous release which prompted him to give the fans "something heavy", yet makes people think about big questions in life. Red albums are known to address darker themes in their music, such as the struggles humans face in life. Gone includes the band's second recorded cover in the form of "Unstoppable" by Australian musician Sia.

== Release ==
Gone was released on October 27, 2017. A digital pre-order became available on September 22, which included a digital download of "Still Alive", the radio single. Those who pre-order will have access to a second download on October 13, "Gone". A digital-only deluxe edition of the album includes 17 tracks. Limited edition packages were made available via the band's PledgeMusic site.

== Critical reception ==
Professional ratings
Review scores
Source	Rating
AllMusic	Positive
CCM Magazine	4/5 stars
Cross Rhythms	9/10 squares
Cryptic Rock	4/5
Indie Vision Music	2/5
Jesusfreakhideout.com	3/5 stars 3.5/5 stars
Today's Christian Entertainment	3/5 stars
Melodic Net	3.5/5 stars
Sputnikmusic	3.5/5 stars 3/5 stars

Gone was met with mixed to positive reviews from critics and fans. According to the aggregate website Album of The Year, the album holds a user rating score of 61 out of 100, based on 26 reviews.

In a review for Jesus Freak Hideout, David Craft gave the album three stars out of five. He thought that while Gone remains "exceptionally listenable", it would leave a number of Red fans "frustratingly disappointed" due to their incorporation of more electronic music elements to their arrangements and the scarcity of memorable song hooks and melodies.

== Track listing ==
No.	Title	Writer(s)	Length
1.	"Step Inside, the Violence"	Anthony Armstrong, Rob Graves	3:04
2.	"Still Alive"	A. Armstrong, Graves, Michael Barnes, Jason McArthur	3:19
3.	"Losing Control"	Graves, McArthur, Stacy Hogan, Dustin Bates	4:08
4.	"Gone"	A. Armstrong, Graves, McArthur	3:38
5.	"Coming Apart"	Barnes, Graves, McArthur	3:55
6.	"Unstoppable" (Sia cover)	Sia Furler, Christopher Braide	3:40
7.	"Fracture"	Randy Armstrong, A. Armstrong, Barnes, Graves	3:09
8.	"Chasing Your Echo"	A. Armstrong, Barnes, Graves, Joe Rickard	3:36
9.	"A.I."	A. Armstrong, Graves, Bates, McArthur, Mark Holman	4:10
10.	"Singularity"	Graves	5:10
Total length:			37:49

Digital deluxe edition
No.	Title	Writer(s)	Length
11.	"The Mask Slips Away"	Barnes, Graves, A. Armstrong	4:44
12.	"Still Alive (Looking for a Reason)"	Barnes, A. Armstrong, Graves, McArthur	3:08
13.	"Gone" (JSapp Remix)	A. Armstrong, Graves, McArthur	3:21
14.	"Unstoppable" (Redux Version)	Furler, Braide	3:52
15.	"Step Inside, The Violence" (Alex Nice Remix)	A. Armstrong, Graves	2:49
16.	"Coming Apart" (Deconstructed)	Barnes, Graves, McArthur	3:55
17.	"Gone" (.grav3s Version)	A. Armstrong, Graves, McArthur	3:27
Total length:			63:05

== Personnel ==
Red

- Michael Barnes – lead vocals
- Anthony Armstrong – guitars, programming
- Randy Armstrong – bass, backing vocals

Additional musicians

- Joe Rickard – drums, programming, drum editing

Additional personnel

- Tom Baker – mastering
- Jeremy Cowart – band photography
- Rob Graves – producer, engineering, programming, string engineering
- Igor Khoroshev – programming, string arrangements
- Jason McArthur – executive producer
- Alex Niceforo – programming
- Oscar Nilsson – drum engineering
- Tim Parker – art direction, design
- Paul Pavao – mixing
- Jason Root – A&R
- Justin Spotswood – engineering

== Charts ==
Chart (2017)	Peak position
US Billboard 200	38
US Top Christian Albums (Billboard)	1
US Top Alternative Albums (Billboard)	5
US Top Hard Rock Albums (Billboard)	2
US Top Rock Albums (Billboard)	7
