= Taddy Porter =

American rock band

- Origin: Stillwater, Oklahoma, United States
- Genres: Hard rock, Blues rock, Glam metal, southern rock
- Years active: 2007–present
- Label: Primary Wave Music
- Members: Andy Brewer; Joe Selby; Doug Jones; Kevin Jones

Taddy Porter is an American rock band formed in 2007 in Stillwater, Oklahoma, United States. The band members are Andy Brewer (lead vocal/guitar), Joe Selby (lead guitar/backing vocals), Doug Jones (drums), and Kevin Jones (bass). The band describes their sound as a mix of classic rock and blues in a modern-rock setting.

== History ==
Taddy Porter was initially envisioned as the duo of Andy Brewer and Doug Jones, but after taking guitar lessons from Selby, Brewer decided to bring him on as lead guitarist and the three invited Jones' brother, Kevin, to fill out the quartet. The name of the band was chosen after Andy noticed it on a bar beer list and believed it fit the band. The band originally began building their act at Dirty's Tavern, a local bar in their hometown of Stillwater.

In December 2007 they recorded a 4-track EP, Monocle, produced by Trent Bell at Bell Labs Recording Studio in Norman, Oklahoma.

In late 2009 Scott Frazier of Overtone Music Group was sent to Oklahoma City to see another band. Taddy Porter approached him and asked him if he would watch their support set. Frazier was so impressed he signed them to a management contract within a few days.

Frazier's partner, Rick Smith had this assessment of the band, “This band is going to be the biggest one in my 35 years of doing this. This is truly something special. This is Paul Rodgers 1969, if Free came from Stillwater, Okla., or if Joe Cocker had a baby with Robert Plant, it would be Andy Brewer. All the successful great rock bands of the last 30 years have had that dual focus — whether it's starting with Jagger and Richards, or Lennon and McCartney or Tyler and Perry or Axl and Slash. You have to have the two front guys in Andy and Joe. Joe will be one of the quintessential guitar players of his generation. This is a band that only comes around like once in a generation. They're that special.”

The band was signed to a record deal with independent label Primary Wave Records, which not only allows the band to retain the rights to its songs, but also includes distribution through EMI records.

The band's debut single "Shake Me" was featured on Monday Night Football on December 21, 2009. It was also used in episode 24 of the ABC sitcom Cougar Town on May 24, 2010 (previously "In the Morning" had been used in episodes 18 and 21.) "Shake Me" was also featured in the NBC show Chase.

The band had two songs ("King Louie" and "Mean Bitch") featured in the seventh season premiere of Entourage on HBO June 27, 2010, and two songs ("Railroad Queen" and "King Louie") can be heard in the upcoming John Cena movie "Legendary".

On July 27, 2010 it was announced that Taddy Porter would tour with Slash and Myles Kennedy for eight dates in September 2010.

In the Autumn 2010, the band toured with Canadian band Finger Eleven on select tour dates, as well as with Evans Blue. They also opened for Alter Bridge on select dates in the United States.

Model Chelsea Tallarico, daughter of Aerosmith lead singer and former American Idol judge Steven Tyler, is featured in the band's 2011 music video for the song "Long Slow Drag."

=== Stay Golden ===
The group's next album Stay Golden was released on February 26, 2013.

=== Tame the Wolf ===
On December 12, 2014, Taddy Porter announced that they would start recording their third album, Tame the Wolf, on January 2, 2015, in Nashville, Tennessee. The third album changed its name to Big Wheel and was released on May 20, 2017.

== Discography ==
=== Studio albums ===
- Taddy Porter (2010) [#24 Top Heatseekers]
- Stay Golden (2013)
- Big Wheel (2017)

=== Extended plays ===
- Monocle (2007)

=== Singles ===
Year	Single	Peak chart positions	Album
Year	Single	US Main.	Album
2010	"Shake Me"	24	Taddy Porter
2010	"Big Enough"	34	Taddy Porter
2011	"Long Slow Drag"	—	Taddy Porter
2012	"Fever"	—	Stay Golden
"—" denotes releases that did not chart.
