= Red (band) =

American Christian rock band

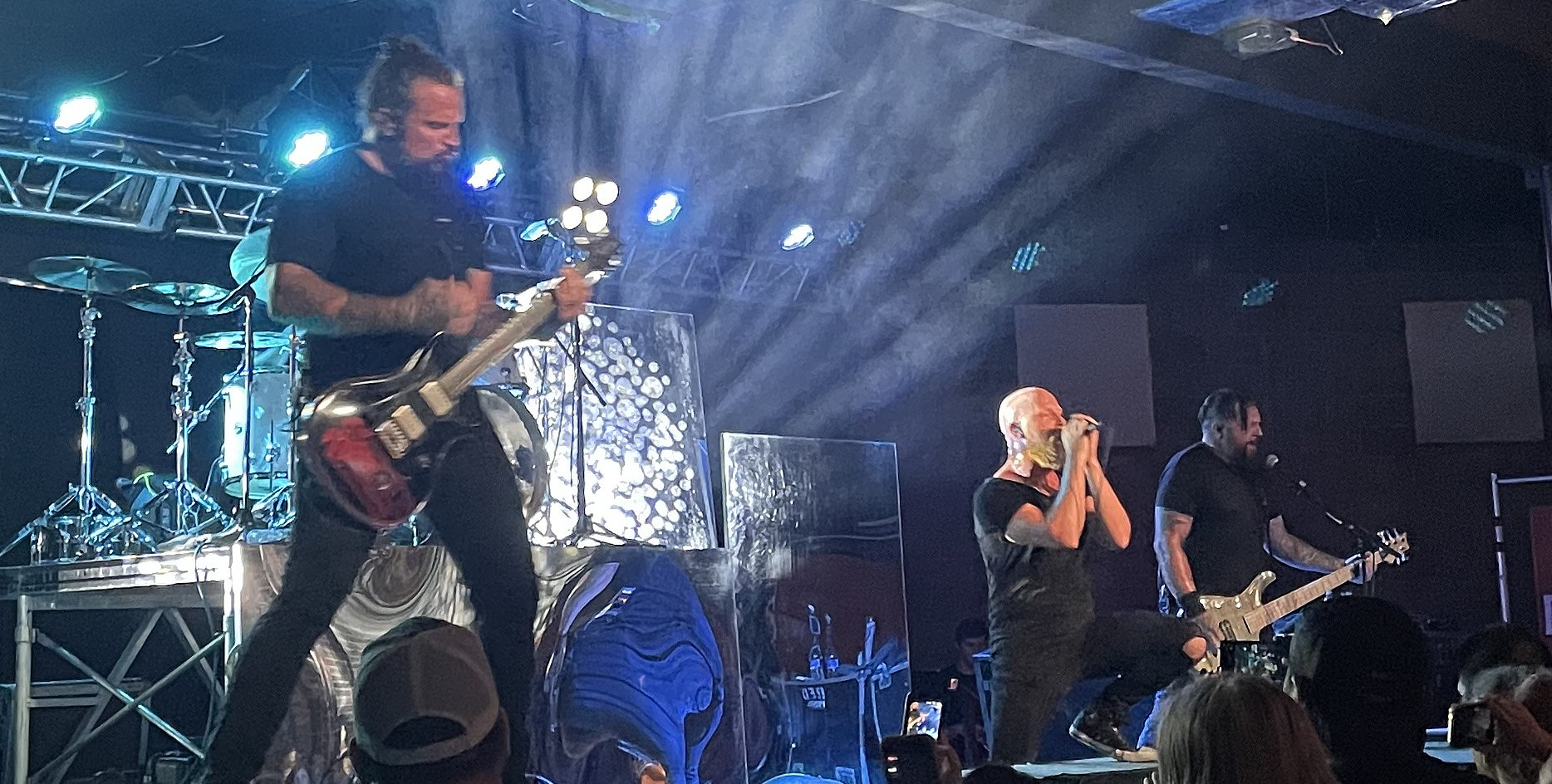
- Red performing in 2021

Background information
- Origin: Nashville, Tennessee, U.S.
- Genres: Christian rock; post-grunge; Christian metal; nu metal; alternative metal; hard rock; alternative rock
- Works: Red discography
- Years active: 2002–present
- Labels: Sony; Essential; Red Entertainment; The Fuel
- Members: Anthony Armstrong; Randy Armstrong; Dan Johnson
- Past members: Michael Barnes; Andrew Hendrix; Hayden Lamb; Jasen Rauch; Joe Rickard; Brian Medeiros
- Website: thebandred.com

Red (stylized as RED or R3D) is an American Christian rock band from Nashville, Tennessee, formed in 2002 by brothers Anthony (guitars) and Randy Armstrong (bass, piano) and Michael Barnes (lead vocals). The band's first lineup also consisted of Andrew Hendrix (drums) and Jasen Rauch (guitars).

After they recorded several demos displaying a style of alternative, hard, and Christian rock music, Red landed a development deal with their longtime producer Rob Graves which led to a record deal with Christian label Essential Records in 2004. Their debut albums End of Silence (2006) and Innocence & Instinct (2009) were nominated for a Grammy Award for Best Rock Gospel Album, and spawned the popular singles "Breathe Into Me" and "Death of Me". Red's mainstream popularity grew and their third album, Until We Have Faces (2011), reached No. 2 on the Billboard 200, which was followed by Release the Panic (2013), which peaked at No. 7, of Beauty and Rage (2015), Gone (2017), Declaration (2020), and Rated R (2023).

== History ==
=== Formation and signing with Essential (2002–2004) ===
Red was formed by identical twin brothers, guitarist Anthony and bassist Randy Armstrong, and lead vocalist and pianist Michael Barnes. The three grew up in Linesville, Pennsylvania, where Barnes first met the Armstrongs at elementary school and remained friends. They gained inspiration to pursue a music career after they attended festivals, including acts at the Christian-themed Creation Festival, and wished to perform on stage. They became members of Ascension, their early gigs taking place in youth centres around Erie, Pennsylvania, playing covers of contemporary Christian music before they turned to hard rock.

After the three finished their education, they relocated to Nashville, Tennessee in February 2002 after Audio Adrenaline guitarist Barry Blair had heard their music online and invited them to record. The three worked day jobs, Barnes as a nurse in an emergency room and the Armstrongs in a mall, while using their spare time to form their own musical style, which was influenced by Linkin Park, Sevendust, and Chevelle as they liked the band's emotionally-driven music. The first lineup of Red was completed in 2004 following the addition of drummer Andrew Hendrix and guitarist Jasen Rauch. Randy said they wished for a band name that was "short, meaningful, and easy to remember". They spent two years searching for groups with a similar name and secured a trademark with "Red".

With the lineup secured, Red entered a longtime association with producer, songwriter, and musician Rob Graves. After they had recorded four demos in a garage and a nursery that displayed their style of alternative, hard and Christian rock music. Rauch, who had worked as an intern in the same Nashville studio as Graves and supplied them with free equipment, invited Graves to listen to their music for his opinions. Graves recalled: "It was really rough, all over the map, but I could hear the elements were there ... I told them it was really good, it had potential."

Graves took them under his wing and paid for studio time and the production of their first demos at Paragon Studios, which happened across two years. Graves then signed Red to a development contract with his independent production company Six Feet Over, which led to a recording deal with Provident Label Group which then assigned them to its Christian label Essential Records after they liked their demo. Essential gave Red the green-light on a full-length album. Speaking on their Christian influence, Barnes said: "We are Christians in a band, but if people feel more comfortable and say that we are a Christian band, we do not shy away from that." Hendrix parted ways with Red before recording began; he was replaced by drummer Hayden Lamb.

=== End of Silence (2004–2008) ===
After spending two years on the album, End of Silence was released on June 6, 2006. Recorded in Nashville, the album features orchestral arrangements from Bernie Herms and David Davidson, reflecting on the group's interest in classical music. Rauch gave his insight on mainstream music and his own influences to the rest of the band as they were primarily followers of Christian music and had little knowledge of contemporary pop. The band's logo was designed by Randy Armstrong. It had a successful impact, receiving a Grammy Award nomination for Best Rock Gospel Album at the 49th awards, and reaching No. 6 on the Billboard Top Heatseekers and No. 7 on the Top Christian Albums charts. Later in 2007, it was re-released by Epic Records, and entered the Billboard 200 chart at No. 194. The album was certified gold by the Recording Industry Association of America (RIAA) in 2015 for selling over 500,000 physical copies in the US. The first of its six singles, "Breathe Into Me", reached No. 15 on the Billboard Mainstream Rock chart, won a GMA Dove Award for Recorded Song of the Year in the rock category, and was certified gold by the RIAA in 2015 for 500,000 digital sales.

Red supported End of Silence with a tour that began in 2006 and supported by various acts, including Three Days Grace, Breaking Benjamin, and Candlebox. In November 2007, their transit van and trailer crashed into a guardrail on Interstate 24 and slid sideways across a highway, causing major damage to the vehicles and Lamb suffering injuries to his already injured shoulder that forced him to sit for some of the remaining dates. Lamb returned, but the injury had affected his ability to travel and perform which led to his departure in 2008. He was replaced by his friend Joe Rickard. The incident became a source of inspiration and "fuel" for the band's future songs. In 2009, "Lost" won a GMA Dove Award for Recorded Song of the Year at its 40th ceremony. By 2009, the band had performed over 500 gigs.

=== Innocence & Instinct (2008–2010) ===
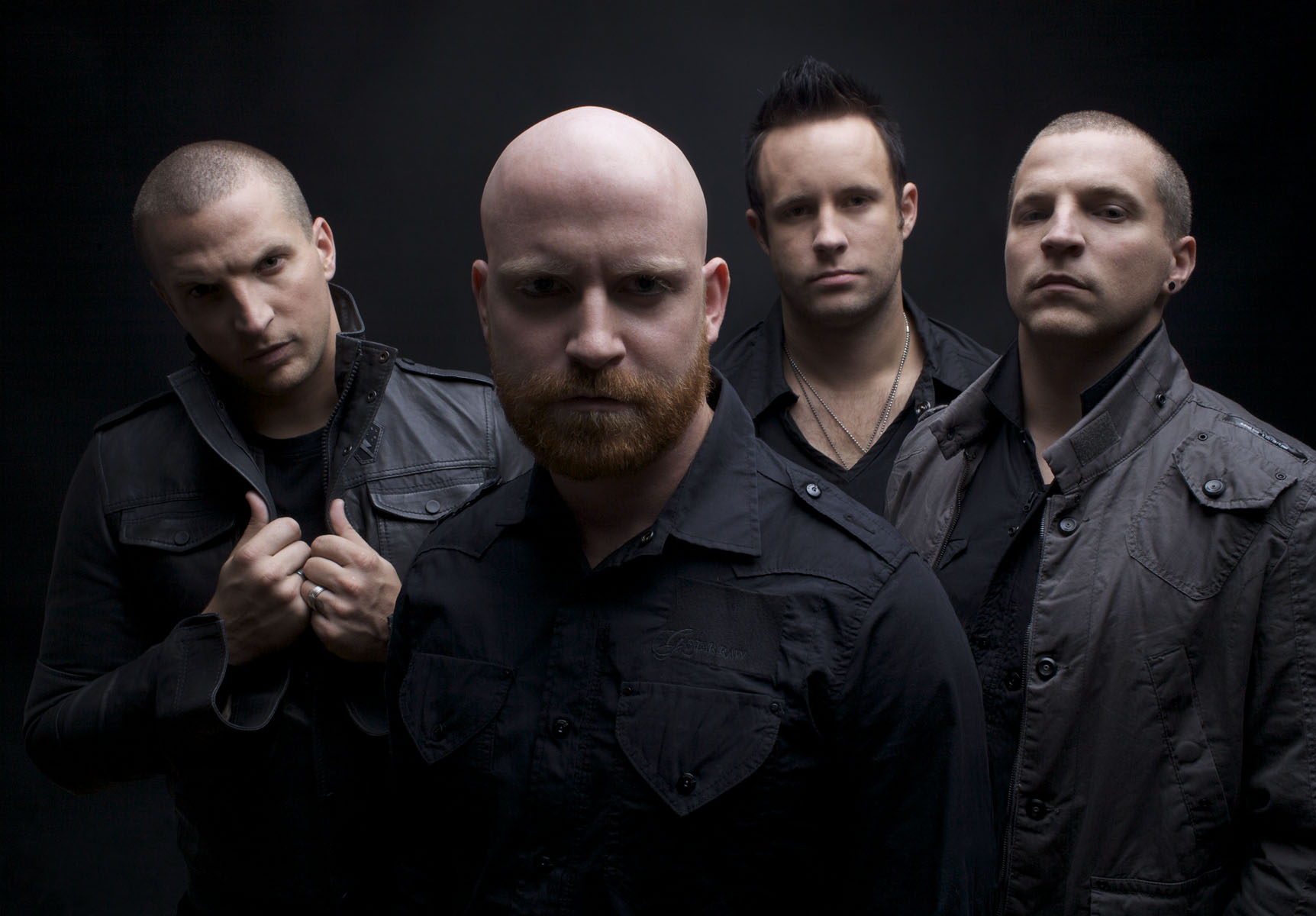
The band members in 2008

Red started work on their second album, Innocence & Instinct, shortly after they had completed End of Silence. In January 2008, they began a six-week period rehearsing and laying down drum tracks so they could continue recording while on tour. Graves joined the group on the road and assembled a studio at the back of their tour bus. They would assemble hotel mattresses in a corner and record vocals in the enclosed space. Recording took place at Little Big Sound, The Graveyard, and Paragon Studios in Tennessee. Their website issued a statement explaining the album "was forged from a storm of inspiration and catastrophe" and later revealed Dante's Inferno and artwork by Gustave Doré as inspirations behind the music. They halted its progress to headline a nationwide club tour in March 2008, their first without a restrictive time slot which allowed them to develop their stage performance.

Released on February 10, 2009, Innocence & Instinct fared better on the charts than their first effort, entering the Billboard 200 at No. 15 and selling 39,000 copies in its first week. "Shadows" was co-written by Breaking Benjamin founder and singer Benjamin Burnley. A Deluxe Edition was also released with "Forever", an additional track, and bonus features. The single "Fight Inside" became the first by a Christian rock band to enter the Radio & Records charts at No. 1. In 2009, Red unveiled their new website to coincide with the video and single release of "Forever". Soon after, the band confirmed that Lamb had left the band due to the injuries sustained from the car crash along with Rauch, who wished to dedicate time with his family, and Rickard had become a full-time member. Rauch's contract with Red allowed him to continue writing for the band for some time after his departure. Innocence & Instinct won Rock Album of the Year at the 2010 GMA Dove Awards.

Red toured the album from February 2009 through 2010 with Saving Abel, Pop Evil, and Taddy Porter on the Class of 2009 Tour. On their website the band announced that they would be touring with Pillar and The Wedding on the Nothing and Everything Tour, which started in January 2010. In March, the band toured with Breaking Benjamin, Thousand Foot Krutch and Chevelle, followed by the Awake and Alive Tour with Skillet and The Letter Black.

=== Until We Have Faces (2010–2012) ===
Red worked on new material for Until We Have Faces during their 2009–2010 tours. They travelled with a portable case that unfolds into a mini recording studio, allowing them to put down ideas in the green room at venues. In a departure from their usual songwriting methods, much of the demo material stemmed from Rauch's rhythms he developed for song ideas on his home kit, leaving the rest of the group to develop their parts from them. Barnes said the band wanted to direct the album towards the idea of someone finding their own identity, and drew inspirations from various sources, including the novel Till We Have Faces by C.S. Lewis.

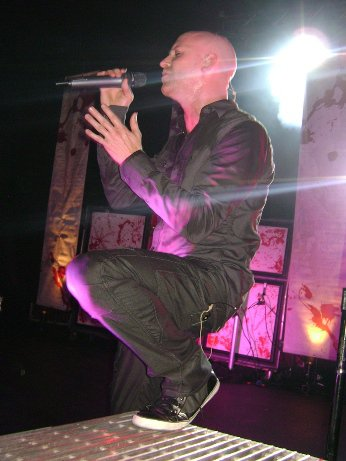
Barnes performing in 2010 during the Nothing & Everything Tour

Until We Have Faces was released on February 1, 2011. The band released a teaser video online, featuring the band's name on a sheet of parchment which burns away and revealing the album's title. A picture was posted on Graves's Twitter account showing three guitars with tape on them showing tunings of A#, A, and G#, which hinted that this record may be heavier than the previous two. As part of the preliminary hype for the album, Red asked fans to send photos of their faces to the band. On December 9, codes were given to all fans that sent in pictures of their faces to download an MP3 for the song "Feed the Machine".

The fan photos were used to create a mosaic poster. Red promoted the album's release with performances on the network television shows Late Night with Conan O'Brien and The Tonight Show with Jay Leno, their first television appearances. The album also debuted at No. 2 on the Billboard 200. "Feed the Machine" started to be added to Active Rock Radio stations in mid-February. Until We Have Faces has sold approximately 100,000 copies in the US. "Start Again" won Best Rock Recorded Song of the Year at the 2011 GMA Dove Awards.

Red was a part of the 2011 WinterJam lineup which started up in January. They joined Union Entertainment label-mates Hinder on their All American Nightmare Tour which kicked off on May 10, 2011. On June 5, 2011, they started their Kill Th3 Machin3 Tour with Oh No Fiasco, Taddy Porter, Red Jumpsuit Apparatus and Evans Blue. In September 2011 they went on the "Rock Allegiance Tour" with Buckcherry, Papa Roach, Puddle of Mudd, P.O.D., Crossfade and Drive A. They hit the road immediately after this to start their second leg of the Kill Th3 Machin3 Tour, with Brian "Head" Welch, Echoes the Fall and Icon for Hire. The tour ended in Atlanta, Georgia, on October 26. Red completed the WinterJam 2011 WEST COAST in November and participated in Christmas Rock Night during the holiday season. Red was also the first band to ever enter Loudwire's Cage Match Hall of Fame, beating bands like Skillet, Seether, and Nickelback. In 2011, the band members were made Grand Marshalls of a parade in Linesville, Pennsylvania, where the Armstrong and Barnes grew up.

In February and March 2012 they were on the Redvolution Tour with Thousand Foot Krutch, Manafest, Nine Lashes, and Kiros. Red announced a European tour in April 2012.

=== Release the Panic (2012–2014) ===
On July 10, 2012, Red announced their fourth album, Release the Panic, was in progress. For the first time in their career, the band worked with a different producer other than Graves, choosing Howard Benson. He intentionally stripped the band's sound and made it less produced, and Red adopted a more melodic and alternative rock sound than previous releases. They worked 18 months on writing the music, and around two years recording. The first single, "Release the Panic", was released in November 2012. Release the Panic was released on February 5, 2013. The album debuted on the U.S. Billboard 200 chart at No. 7, with first week sales of around 41,000. Red coincided the release of Release the Panic with their 3-disc anthology album Who We Are: The Red Anthology, formed of their first three albums.

Their subsequent tours culminated in Rickard's final performance with the band on January 26, 2014, before he finished the sessions for the Red remix EP Release the Panic: Re-Calibrated, released on April 29, 2014, and left the group. Debuting at No. 75 on the Billboard 200 charts, the release includes six songs from Release the Panic with orchestral arrangements and new elements added to the original tracks and one new song. Rickard was replaced by Love and Death drummer Dan Johnson, in time for an eight-city tour with Demon Hunter and Veridia.

=== of Beauty and Rage (2014–2017) ===
For their fifth studio release, Red resumed their association with Graves and, in January 2014, returned to the ski lodge studio in Maine to develop material for of Beauty and Rage. As they prepared new material, they discussed what they had learned while making Release the Panic and what they wished to do differently for the new album. A snowstorm occurred during this time, forcing the group inside which, according to Barnes, benefited the writing process. They produced four demos as the result of what they thought Red fans wanted to hear, and aspects in life that passionately drives them. The group experienced "personal heartbreak and loss" while making it, and named the opening and closing instrumental tracks "Descent" and "Ascent" respectively, as they found studio time partnered with their faith uplifting. During the album's recording, Red announced their total career sales had totalled 1.1 million units.

The album was released on February 24, 2015, and debuted at No. 14 on the Billboard 200 charts. A graphic novel, The Ever, telling the story behind the album, was released in January 2016.

In June 2016, End of Silence was re-released as a deluxe edition to commemorate its tenth anniversary. It contains a new song, "If I Break", a song already cut but left off the original album, an instrumental demo, "Circles", and other bonus content. Red celebrated the release with an anniversary tour which marked the return to performing songs from the album after a long time, playing smaller venues, and using older instruments.

=== Gone (2017–2018) ===
On September 26, 2017, Gospel Music Association released an article about an upcoming album. The article also stated that Red had sold almost 2 million albums. Material for Red's sixth album, Gone, was already being worked on in November 2016, with the main rehearsal sessions taking place the month after. Anthony Armstrong expressed a shift in releasing albums in the traditional way due to the decline in physical sales and the popularity of digital music. He also said the group would stray from Christian music markets more on this release, and would focus more efforts into promoting and touring within the general music market, which is where they began. Gone was officially announced in September 2017, and released on October 27, debuting at No. 13 on the Billboard 200 charts. A 17-track deluxe edition was also released.

In March and April 2018, they toured with Lacey Sturm, Righteous Vendetta and Messer.

=== Declaration (2019–2022) ===
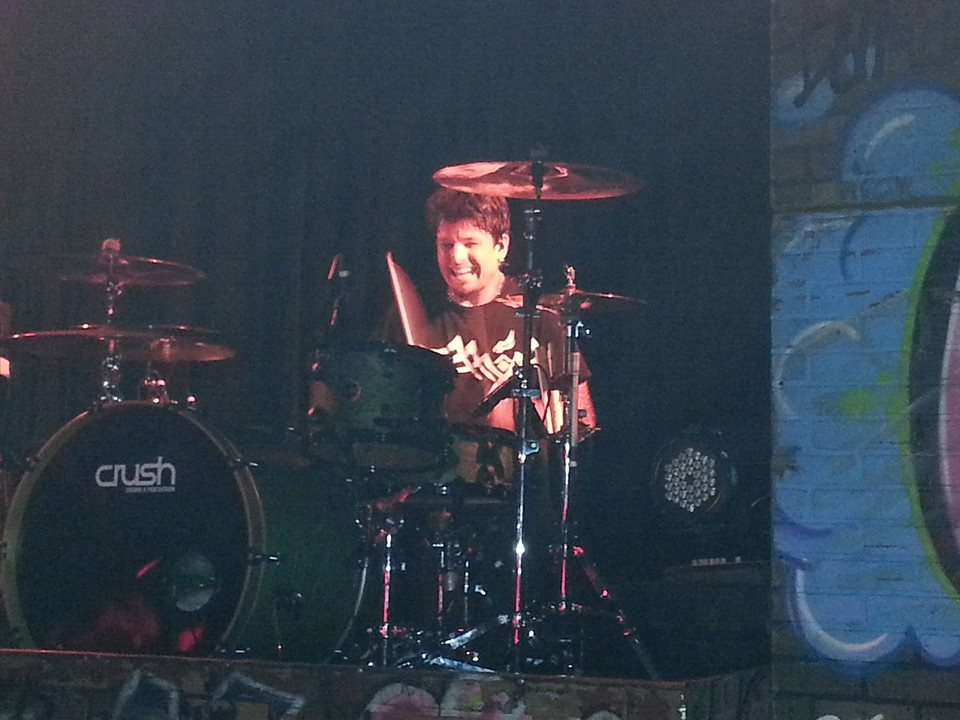
Drummer Dan Johnson became a full-time member in 2019.

The band posted an update, via a YouTube video on January 21, 2019. They announced that they were no longer signed to Essential/Sony and they would record their next album independently. They also announced that touring drummer Dan Johnson joined the band full-time as their fourth member, thus making a four-piece lineup for the first time since 2014. On June 7, the band released "The Evening Hate", their first new released music since leaving their record label. After announcing a small run of 10th anniversary tour dates for Innocence & Instinct, the band released another single, "From the Ashes", accompanied by a lyric video, and announced more tour dates. On September 17, they announced a tour with In Flames for 36 dates across North America. On October 11, the band announced a new EP, The Evening Hate, would be released November 1, in addition to releasing a new single, "Hemorrhage", a cover of the Fuel song of the same name.

On January 10, 2020, the band announced that their seventh studio album, Declaration, was set for release on April 10, 2020. On March 25, the band announced that Declaration would be released a week earlier than its original April 10 release date. The album was released on April 3 as planned, and peaked at No. 61 on the Billboard 200 charts. On February 9, 2021, the band announced that they had parted ways with Dan Johnson. Shortly after Johnson's departure, the band hired new drummer Brian Medeiros.

=== Rated R (2023–present) ===
The group's first live album, Until We Have Faces: Live and Unplugged, was released on December 2, 2022. During the announcement of the live album's release, the band also announced that they would release a new album sometime in spring 2023. The band went on both headlining tours and supporting tours with Alter Bridge, Mammoth WVH and Pistols at Dawn for January and the majority of February.

On January 24, 2023, they revealed the name of the new album to be Rated R on their Facebook page. On June 16, the band revealed the album would be released on September 29, 2023, while also stating that the lead single of the album titled "Surrogates" would be available for all streaming services on August 4. The band also announced they would embark on the "Rated R Tour", which started in September and carries on until 2024. On September 1, they released two new songs, "Cold World" and "Minus It All".

Red collaborated with Canadian Christian rock band Thousand Foot Krutch to remake the latter's song "I Get Wicked". The song, titled "I Get Wicked (Reignited)", was released on March 8, 2024.

In June 2024, the band announced the "Emergency Tour", taking place during September, featuring guest appearances from Adelitas Way and Kingdom Collapse.

On October 27, 2024, it was announced that former drummer Hayden Lamb died.

On May 25, 2025, drummer Brian Medeiros announced his departure from the band.

The band made an appearance at Welcome to Rockville, which took place in Daytona Beach, Florida, in May 2026. On March 1, 2026, the band announced the departure of original vocalist Michael Barnes, who retired from performing in order to spend time with his family, and the return of drummer Dan Johnson. Barnes performed with the band for his final show on June 5 in Dallas. AJ Reingardt of OHKAYA was chosen as his live replacement.

== Musical style ==
Red's musical style has been described as Christian rock, alternative rock, alternative metal, Christian metal, nu metal, post-grunge and hard rock. They have also incorporated symphonic elements in the majority of their music since the beginning of their career, while electronics were introduced in later releases.

== Band members ==
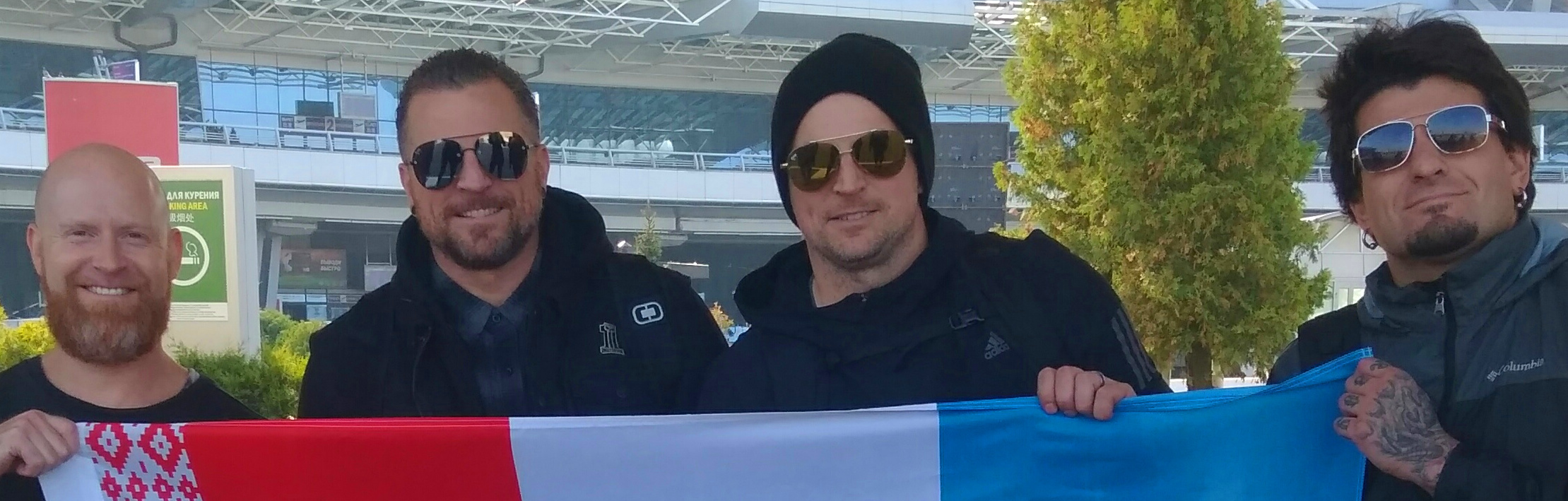
The band members in 2018

Current members

- Anthony Armstrong – guitars, backing vocals (2002–present)
- Randy Armstrong – bass, backing vocals, piano (2002–present)
- Dan Johnson – drums (2019–2021, 2026–present; touring musician 2014–2018; session musician 2014)

Touring musicians

- Dango Cellan – drums (2014)
- Lucio Rubino – guitars, backing vocals (2022)
- AJ Reingardt – lead vocals (2026–present)

Former members

- Michael Barnes – lead vocals (2002–2026)
- Andrew Hendrix – drums (2004–2006)
- Hayden Lamb – drums (2006–2008; died 2024)
- Jasen Rauch – lead guitar (2004–2009; guest appearances 2017, 2022)
- Joe Rickard – drums (2009–2014; touring musician 2008–2009; session musician 2008, 2014, 2017)
- Brian Medeiros – drums (2021–2025)

Timeline

== Discography ==
- End of Silence (2006)
- Innocence & Instinct (2009)
- Until We Have Faces (2011)
- Release the Panic (2013)
- Of Beauty and Rage (2015)
- Gone (2017)
- Declaration (2020)
- Rated R (2023)

== Awards ==
GMA Dove Awards

| Year | Award | Result |
|---|---|---|
| 2007 | Rock Recorded Song of the Year ("Breathe Into Me") | Won |
| 2007 | Rock Album of the Year (End of Silence) | Nominated |
| 2007 | Short Form Music Video of the Year ("Breathe Into Me") | Nominated |
| 2008 | Rock Recorded Song of the Year ("Break Me Down") | Nominated |
| 2009 | Rock Recorded Song of the Year ("Lost") | Won |
| 2010 | Rock Recorded Song of the Year ("Fight Inside") | Nominated |
| 2010 | Rock Album of the Year (Innocence & Instinct) | Won |
| 2011 | Rock Recorded Song of the Year ("Start Again") | Won |
| 2012 | Rock/Contemporary Recorded Song of the Year ("Faceless") | Nominated |
| 2012 | Rock Album of the Year (Until We Have Faces) | Nominated |
| 2012 | Short Form Music Video of the Year ("Feed the Machine") | Nominated |
| 2013 | Rock Song of the Year ("Who We Are") | Nominated |
| 2013 | Rock Song of the Year ("Perfect Life") | Nominated |
| 2013 | Rock Album of the Year (Release the Panic) | Won |
| 2014 | Rock Song of the Year ("Die for You") | Nominated |
| 2014 | Rock Song of the Year ("Run and Escape") | Nominated |
| 2014 | Rock Album of the Year (Release the Panic: Recalibrated) | Nominated |
| 2015 | Rock Song of the Year ("Darkest Part") | Nominated |
| 2015 | Rock Album of the Year (of Beauty and Rage) | Won |
| 2018 | Rock / Contemporary Recorded Song of the Year ("Gone") | Nominated |
| 2018 | Rock / Contemporary Album of the Year (Gone) | Nominated |
| 2018 | Short Form Video of the Year ("Gone") | Nominated |
