= Breathe Into Me =

Single by Red

from the album End of Silence
- Released: June 6, 2006
- Recorded: 2006
- Genre: Alternative metal; Christian rock
- Length: 3:34
- Label: Essential; Sony
- Songwriters: Anthony Armstrong; Rob Graves; Jasen Rauch; Jason McArthur
- Producer: Rob Graves

Red singles chronology
"Breathe Into Me" (2006)	"Break Me Down" (2006)

Music video
- "Breathe Into Me" on YouTube

"Breathe Into Me" is the first single by the American Christian rock band Red on their debut full-length studio album End of Silence. The song was written by Anthony Armstrong, Rob Graves, Jasen Rauch and Jason McArthur. The song was released on June 6, 2006, although it was sent to all the fans who submitted their faces as part of the hype for the new album on June 6, 2006.

== Background ==
The band said, "On our own, life can lead us to dark places full of anger, mistakes and regrets. This song is about 'falling', finally reaching the end of our rope, where we realize at last ... we need God. The chorus, 'Breathe Your life into me', is a desperate cry for help, a plea for renewal, rebirth – even resurrection. It’s about overcoming wounds and consequences we could never overcome alone."

== Track listing ==
=== Digital single ===
1. "Breathe Into Me" – 3:34

=== EP ===
1. "Breathe Into Me" (radio edit) – 3:25
2. "Breathe Into Me" (acoustic remix) – 3:55

== Charts and certifications ==
=== Charts ===
Chart (2007)	Peak position
US Mainstream Rock (Billboard)	15

=== Certifications ===
Region	Certification	Certified units/sales
United States (RIAA)	Gold	500,000^{‡}
^{‡} Sales+streaming figures based on certification alone.
