= End of Silence (Red album) =

Studio album by Red
- Released: June 6, 2006
- Recorded: 2005–2006
- Studios: Dark Horse Studios, Franklin, Tennessee; Little Big Sound, Nashville, Tennessee; Paragon Studios, Franklin, Tennessee
- Genres: Christian rock; Christian metal; nu metal; alternative metal; symphonic metal; post-grunge
- Length: 46:52
- Labels: Essential, Sony BMG
- Producer: Rob Graves

Red chronology
End of Silence (2006)	Innocence & Instinct (2009)

Singles from End of Silence
- 1. "Breathe Into Me" Released: June 6, 2006; 2. "Break Me Down" Released: December 2006; 3. "Let Go" Released: August 2007; 4. "Lost" Released: 2007; 5. ""Hide" / "Pieces"" Released: November 12, 2007; 6. "Already Over" Released: December 10, 2007

End of Silence is the debut studio album by American Christian rock band Red. It was released on June 6, 2006, through Essential Records and Sony BMG. It was produced by Rob Graves. According to Billboard, the album made it up to position 194 on its top 200 album chart. This is the only Red album to feature drummer Hayden Lamb.

Guitarist Jasen Rauch explained that "Breathe Into Me" is about "'falling,' finally reaching the end of our rope, where we realize at last... we need God."

The album was nominated for a Grammy for Best Rock or Rap Gospel Album at the 49th Grammy Awards.

== Reception ==
=== Critical reception ===
Professional ratings
Aggregate scores
Source	Rating
Album of The Year	60/100
Review scores
Source	Rating
AllMusic	3/5 stars
Cross Rhythms	7/10 squares
Cross Rhythms (Deluxe Edition)	9/10 squares
Cross Rhythms (10th Anniversary Edition)	9/10 squares
Jesusfreakhideout.com	3/5 stars
Jesusfreakhideout.com (Deluxe Edition)	4/5 stars
Jesusfreakhideout.com (10th Anniversary Edition)	4/5 stars 3/5 stars
Melodic Net	4/5 stars

End of Silence received generally favorable reviews from critics, although it was criticized for its unoriginal sound.

Writing for Indie Vision Music, user JoshIVM wrote: ""End Of Silence" is a great album and an even better debut! It's quite amazing how easy it is to listen to this disc over and over. I feel that they have replay ability that some of the bands they can be compared too do not. I hope that they'll learn from this and branch out on their next album, like labelmates Day Of Fire did with "Cut & Move". If they are able to break free of the comparisons the sky truly is the limit for this quintet."

John DiBiase of Jesus Freak Hideout gave the album 3 out of 5 stars, saying: " The band oozes talent and promise despite its formula, but just seems held back by the ever popular trend in Christian music to emulate the mainstream success stories. Could Red stretch their wings beyond the confines of familiarity? While End Of Silence isn't all that it could be, it still isn't bad for what it is."

=== Accolades ===
In 2007, the album won a Dove Award for Rock Album of the Year at the 38th GMA Dove Awards. It was also nominated for a Grammy for Best Rock or Rap Gospel Album at the 49th Grammy Awards. RIAA has certified "Breathe Into Me" Gold.

== Track listing ==
No.	Title	Writer(s)	Length
1.	"Intro (End of Silence)"	Rob Graves, Jason McArthur, Jasen Rauch	0:58
2.	"Breathe Into Me"	Anthony Armstrong, Graves, McArthur, Rauch	3:34
3.	"Let Go"	Armstrong, Chad Cates, Graves, McArthur, Rauch	5:15
4.	"Already Over"	Graves, McArthur, Rauch	4:24
5.	"Lost"	Cates, Graves, Rauch	5:15
6.	"Pieces"	Graves	5:58
7.	"Break Me Down"	Armstrong, Graves, Rauch	4:14
8.	"Wasting Time"	Armstrong, Graves, Rauch	3:21
9.	"Gave It All Away"	Rauch	3:13
10.	"Hide"	Armstrong, Graves, Bernie Herms, Rauch	5:24
11.	"Already Over, Pt. 2"	Graves, McArthur, Rauch	5:12
Total length:			46:52

Deluxe edition bonus track
No.	Title	Length
12.	"Lost" (acoustic version)	4:29

Deluxe edition bonus DVD
No.	Title	Length
1.	"Wasting Time"
2.	"Hide"
3.	"Let Go"
4.	"Already Over"
5.	"Pieces"
6.	"Break Me Down"
7.	"Breathe Into Me"

10th Anniversary Edition bonus track
No.	Title	Length
12.	"Breathe Into Me" (remix acústica)	3:54
13.	"Already Over" (acoustic version)	4:00
14.	"Lost" (acoustic version)	4:29
15.	"Hide" (acoustic version)	4:07
16.	"If I Break"	4:39
17.	"Circles" (working demo – instrumental)	7:04

== Personnel ==
End of Silence album personnel as listed on AllMusic.

Red

- Michael Barnes – lead vocals, piano
- Jasen Rauch – lead guitar
- Anthony Armstrong – rhythm guitar, backing vocals
- Randy Armstrong – bass, backing vocals, piano
- Hayden Lamb – drums, percussion (credited as group member, but does not play on the album)

Additional musicians

- Anthony LaMarchina – cello
- Matt Walker – cello
- Bernie Herms – composer, performer, piano, string arrangements
- Andrew Hendrix – drums, performer on all tracks except "Pieces"
- Steve Brewster – drums, performer on "Pieces"
- Jim Grosjean – viola
- Monisa Angell – viola
- Kris Wilkinson – viola
- David Angell – violin
- David Davidson – string arrangements, violin
- Mary Kathryn Van Osdale – violin
- Pamela Sixfin – violin

Artwork and design

- Stephanie McBrayer – art direction, stylist
- Tim Parker – art direction, design
- Robin Geary – hair stylist, make-up
- Kristin Barlowe – photography

Production and recording

- Rob Graves – audio production, composer, digital editing, engineer, piano, producer, programming
- Ben Grosse – mixing
- Ted Jensen – mastering
- Heather Hetzler – A&R
- Milan Jilek – assistant engineering
- Fred Paragano – digital editing, drum engineering, assistant engineering
- Jason McArthur – composer, executive producer

== Certifications ==
Region	Certification	Certified units/sales
United States (RIAA)	Gold	500,000^{‡}
^{‡} Sales+streaming figures based on certification alone.
