= Until We Have Faces =

2011 studio album by Red

Studio album by Red
- Released: February 1, 2011
- Recorded: August – November 2010
- Studio: Little Big Sound, Nashville, Tennessee; Paragon Studios, Franklin, Tennessee
- Genre: Christian rock; alternative metal; post-grunge; hard rock
- Length: 46:17
- Label: Essential, Sony
- Producer: Rob Graves

Red chronology
Innocence & Instinct (2009)	Until We Have Faces (2011)	Release the Panic (2013)

Singles from Until We Have Faces
- 1. "Faceless" Released: December 31, 2010; 2. "Feed the Machine" Released: February 16, 2011; 3. "Not Alone" Released: April 8, 2011; 4. "Lie to Me (Denial)" Released: July 7, 2011; 5. "Who We Are" Released: January 9, 2012; 6. "Buried Beneath" Released: July 2012

Until We Have Faces is the third studio album by American Christian rock band Red. It was released on February 1, 2011 through Essential Records and Sony Records. It was produced by Rob Graves. It is the first album the band released with four members, due to the absence of Jasen Rauch (although Rauch still contributed to songwriting).

== Production and recording ==
The band released a teaser video on Facebook via YouTube featuring the band name on a sheet of parchment, which burned away, revealing the album title. Unfortunately the music in this teaser video was not in any song on the album. Vocalist Michael Barnes stated on his Facebook page that the new album will be produced by Rob Graves, who also produced the first two albums. A picture was recently posted on producer Rob Graves Twitter account showing three guitars with tape on them showing tunings of A#, A, and G#, which hints that this record may be heavier than the previous two. They also confirmed on their Facebook page that the new album will contain 11 tracks, and a 12th bonus track called "Until We Have Faces" will be available only from iTunes preorder.

== Promotion and release ==
On December 9, 2010, the song "Feed the Machine" was sent to all fans who submitted their face as part of the hype for the new album. The cover art has been revealed. On December 20, RED posted a download to the radio edit of "Faceless" for a limited time. "Faceless" was released to radio on December 31, 2010, as the first single from the album. A full track-listing along with 30-second previews for each song on the Christian Book Distributors website, Christianbook.com. The band released a promotional mosaic for the album, made-up of the fan-submitted pictures. A European edition titled, "Until We Have Faces [World Edition]" was released on July 5, 2011.

== Reception ==
=== Critical ===
Professional ratings
Aggregate scores
Source	Rating
Album of The Year	60/100
Review scores
Source	Rating
Allmusic	3/5 stars
Alt Rock Live	7/10 stars
CCM Magazine	4/5 stars
Christian Manifesto	4.5/5 stars
Christian Music Zine	4/5 stars
Christian Rock 20	3/5 stars
Christianity Today	2/5 stars
Cross Rhythms	9/10 squares
Jesusfreakhideout.com	4/5 stars 3.5/5 stars
Louder Than The Music	4/5 stars
Melodic.net	3/5 stars
New Release Tuesday	5/5 stars 4.5/5 stars
The NewReview	4.5/5 stars
ONCOURSE MAGAZINE	5/5 stars
Sputnikmusic	3/5 stars
[&].com	4/5 stars

Until We Have Faces received generally positive reviews, although critics claimed that it didn't match up to the band's previous album, Innocence & Instinct.

Allmusic's Gregory Heaney said, "blending the plaintive, often reflective sound of post-grunge with a metal edge, Red's third album, Until We Have Faces, finds the band making its most polished album yet." Heaney wrote, "While there’s always a danger of bands going stale, the gamble seems to have paid off here for them, and the album shows a band whose sound is as sweeping and heavy as it's ever been, making this an album that's sure to please longtime fans and make an easy convert out of anyone looking for some new post-grunge heaviness."

Alpha Omega News' Elise graded the album an A, and wrote that, "musically, 'Until We Have Faces' is more an extension of 'Innocence and Instinct' as opposed to a follow-up. It has strong guitars and melodies and the same rough edges listeners have come to expect from Red. Lyrically, however, the band has delved deeper and darker than before. The album's theme of being faceless and struggling to find your true identity is easily relatable for most listeners". Elise wrote, "although at first I was unsure if 'Until We Have Faces' could measure up to the standards set by Red's previous two releases, I was pleasantly surprised by how far it exceeded expectations. It will definitely go down as the next installment of Red's strong musical record."

Alt Rock Live's Jonathan Faulkner wrote, "With all of this it is safe to say that Red is quickly working their way into the list of great Christian rock groups that are out on the market today. They have a solid message, a strong lineup of musicians and now it would seem a household name and an album that we will still be listening to years down the road."

CCM Magazine's Matt Conner said, "[the album] serves up a modern rock feast". Conner wrote, "[the album] cements Red as one of the rock music staples for the next decade."

Christian Manifesto's Kyle Kiekintveld said, "[the album] is unsurprisingly a great album from an oddly underrated band outside of Christian circles. The only real question for Red and this album is whether they will have any luck winning the illusive Rock Gospel Grammy. This album is deserving of it but with every passing year more new artists join the already crowded field and the average quality of Christian Rock albums greatly increases. This is a must have album for fans of this genre and is easily a good gateway album for those who are curious about the genre as a whole."

Christian Manifesto's J.F. Arnold wrote, "all in all, I’m sad that I missed their second album after hearing this one. This album has gotten more play time in my car than I would have expected, and it is definitely a must-have for fans of Red or of the genre."

Christian Music Zine's Anthony Pronto said, "is good but doesn’t reach the knockout sound I wanted from a band I loved seeing live. Don’t get me wrong, the songs were all fine and this will probably bring RED more success, but more of a hard rock edge throughout their next album would definitely make that an album of the year candidate." On a side note, Pronto called the cover art "terrible".

Christian Rock 20's Paul Anthony said, "[the album] largely continues the successful formula of its first two releases." "I have faith that Red, an incredibly enjoyable rock band, also can do better. It has now produced essentially a 30-track, three-part album – an exceptional body of work for this young group." Anthony continued, "but the time has come to move forward, to walk that fine line by growing beyond the themes the band has developed so well – without forgetting them."

Christianity Today's Ron Augustine said, "Red rehashes the same riffs that Linkin Park achieved fame with over a decade ago, but with considerably less firepower." "Even though the album is named after a C. S. Lewis novel (Lewis's actual title is Till We Have Faces), lacks in creativity and thoughtfulness (things Lewis was never short on). Power chords are pounded out in common time until a piano and string bridge offers temporary serenity. It is formulaic and predictable, but some of the faster songs will probably work well in WWE or NFL highlight clips."

Cross Rhythms' Steven Bridge said, "this is a continuation of the Pennsylvania-based band's trademark sound, with a haunting, sometimes dark and ethereal tone that seeps through the songs but always with portholes of hope". "If you enjoyed Red's earlier projects, this certainly won't disappoint."

Jesus Freak Hideout's Nathaniel Schexnayder said, "with this latest release, they have cemented the fact that they are one of the best rock acts around. However, Until We Have Faces doesn't go too many places that Innocence & Instinct didn’t. With that said, sound lyrics and great music have made RED’s third project good, if not even great."

Jesus Freak Hideout's Michael Weaver wrote, "the result lands somewhere in between their debut, End of Silence, and their highly successful sophomore album, Innocence & Instinct." "Another solid outing and is sure to bring more success to the band in both the Christian and secular markets."

Louder Than The Music's Jono Davies said, "if heavy hard rock is your genre of music, Until We Have Faces is an album worth checking out. The hard hitting lyrics that rings out through the songs show that this isn't a band masking their creativity with big distorted guitars, this is a band who have written down words that mean something to them and maybe something to you too."

Melodic.net's Kaj Roth said, "I can only come to the conclusion that this band wants to be super safe and deliver the same album over and over again except this time the songs do not match either "End of silence" (2006) nor "Innocence and instinct" (2009)." "This feels like a huge Hollywood movie, a big budget, lots of special effects but the story is thin and you know the hero will get the girl in the end. 4 stars for the production but 2 stars for the songs, I sure do hope Red dare to try something new on the next album or else I will drop this band."

New Release Tuesday's Kevin Davis said that he was "so impressed by the music and production mingling the harder rock guitars, soft strings and the emotive vocals of Mike Barnes". "[It] is the crowning achievement by this incredible rock band and will certainly be among my top albums of 2011."

New Release Tuesday's Jonathan Francesco wrote, "all in all, Red has crafted a catchy and memorable melodic rock album that will surely find it's [sic] way onto many 'Best of' lists come year's end, even though it's [sic] release comes in February. If Red can keep this up, they surely got a bright career ahead of them in the industry."

TheNewReview's Jonathan Anderson said, "[the album] has been one those reminders. Its heartfelt lyrics are filled with hope, if we choose to find it. It reminds me that I’m not alone. Despite life’s difficulties, the best is yet to come. Life really isn’t all that bad; it’s actually pretty awesome. And I’m privileged to have such incredible music as Until We Have Faces grace my ears with its audible beauty." "Every song has its place and purpose. Red has pulled together yet another fantastic release. Their methods have not changed, but have merely been tweaked and perfected. The use of orchestra instruments is perfectly incorporated. The message is bold and honestly placed. Until We Have Faces is heavy and beautiful, and is my favorite release from Red to date."

ONCOURSE MAGAZINE's Shannon Zabroski said, "[the band with this album] erupts into your ears with the same aural authority as their first two highly-acclaimed releases. Lofty expectations following a duo of successful albums can be tough satisfy, but RED pulls it off while breaking plenty of sweat." Zabroski wrote that "Red continues to impress with lyrical maturity and an addictive signature sound. For better or worse, they met the standard set by their previous GRAMMY-awarded releases. This might sound like faint praise, but in this case, it is a reason to be flattered."

Sputnikmusic's staff reviewer Jared Ponton said, "[this] is that mid-career mainstream rock album that is bound to keep Red alive financially but will aggravate critics and fans, to an extent. The band is recycling itself, not just the elements of its sound, which is welcome and expected, but in the area of its songwriting. Nearly half or more of Until We Have Faces sounds tired and generic, which is something Red fans are not used to when it comes to the band's albums."

Bracket and Bracket's Kyzer Davis said, "[this album contains] Epic rhythm guitars and purely amazing instrumentals including pianos, violins, synths and the distinct Red yell that the lead singers does. This was an amazing album just like the first two. If you have never heard Red I suggest getting this album or any of their albums because you will be amazed that every song is composed very well. A band that can write well rounded songs is hard to find and Red sure know how to do just that. I recommend it, Go now, get this!"

The guitarist John Petrucci from the band Dream Theater has considered this album the best album of the year 2011.

== Track listing ==
No.	Title	Writer(s)	Length
1.	"Feed the Machine"	Anthony Armstrong, Joe Rickard, Rob Graves, Jasen Rauch, Mark Holman	5:10
2.	"Faceless"	A. Armstrong, Graves, Rauch, Holman	3:22
3.	"Lie to Me (Denial)"	A. Armstrong, Graves, Rauch, Holman	4:13
4.	"Let It Burn"	Graves, Rauch, Jason McArthur	4:57
5.	"Buried Beneath"	Graves, Rauch, Mike Seminari, C. Todd Nielsen	3:46
6.	"Not Alone"	Graves, Rauch, Holman	4:08
7.	"Watch You Crawl"	Graves, Rauch, Clint Lowery	3:42
8.	"The Outside"	Graves, Rauch	3:14
9.	"Who We Are"	A. Armstrong, Randy Armstrong, Mike Barnes, Graves, McArthur	3:54
10.	"Best Is Yet to Come"	Graves, Rauch, Holman	4:04
11.	"Hymn for the Missing"	Graves, Rauch	5:37
Total length:			46:17

iTunes Pre-Order bonus track
No.	Title	Length
12.	"Until We Have Faces" (iTunes exclusive)	2:35

World Edition bonus tracks
No.	Title	Writer(s)	Length
12.	"Breathe Into Me"	Rauch, A. Armstrong, Graves, McArthur	3:34
13.	"Already Over"	Rauch, Graves, McArthur	4:24
14.	"Fight Inside"	Rauch, Graves, McArthur, Bernie Herms	4:08
15.	"Death of Me"	Rauch, Graves	4:17
16.	"Never Be the Same"	Rauch, Graves, McArthur, Seminari, Nielsen	3:49
17.	"Ordinary World"	Simon Le Bon, Nick Rhodes, John Taylor, Warren Cuccurullo	4:58

== Music videos ==
On April 25, 2011, Red started shooting for the music video "Feed the Machine". Fans were asked to come as extras for a scene in the video. The second music video, "Lie to Me" was shot the following day. Both videos were produced by Dan Atchison and directed by The Erwin Brothers. "Feed the Machine" was released on June 6, 2011. RED posted clips from the "Feed the Machine" video on their Facebook and YouTube pages before it was released. The music video for "Lie to Me (Denial)" was premiered on July 7, 2011, on Noisecreep. Red announced that they would be making a music video for "Not Alone" using fan submissions of how the song has impacted their life or a life of someone they know.

== Until We Have Faces: Live and Unplugged ==
Until We Have Faces: Live and Unplugged

Live album by Red
- Released: December 2, 2022
- Recorded: 2022
- Length: 47:34
- Label: Red Entertainment, Fuel Music
- Producer: Anthony Armstrong

Until We Have Faces: Live and Unplugged is the first live album by American Christian rock band Red, released on December 2, 2022. The album was performed and recorded in front of a live audience earlier the same year (who can be heard applauding in the tracks). It is also the band's first album with drummer Brian Medeiros.

=== Track listing ===
No.	Title	Length
1.	"Feed the Machine" (Live)	5:26
2.	"Faceless" (Live)	3:22
3.	"Lie to Me" (Live)	4:13
4.	"Let It Burn" (Live)	4:59
5.	"Buried Beneath" (Live)	3:51
6.	"Not Alone" (Live)	4:09
7.	"Watch You Crawl" (Live)	3:40
8.	"The Outside" (Live)	3:18
9.	"Who We Are" (Live)	4:44
10.	"Best Is Yet to Come" (Live)	4:04
11.	"Hymn for the Missing" (Live)	5:48
Total length:		47:34

== Personnel ==
Information gathered from the digital Until We Have Faces extended booklet.

Red

- Michael Barnes – lead vocals
- Anthony Armstrong – guitars, backing vocals
- Randy Armstrong – bass, backing vocals, piano
- Joe Rickard – drums, percussion
- Brian Medeiros – drums (Until We Have Faces: Live and Unplugged)

Production and recording

- Rob Graves – producer, drum producer, engineer
- Jason McArthur – executive producer
- Jasen Rauch – engineer, drum producer, additional production
- Ben Grosse – mixing
- Paul Pavao – mixing assistant
- Tom Baker – mastering at Precision Mastering, Los Angeles
- Paragon Studios, Franklin, Tennessee – drum recording location
- Fred Paragano – drum engineer
- Brian Calhoon – drum engineer
- Little Big Sound, Bellevue, Tennessee – string recording location
- Baeho "Bobby" Shin – string engineer
- Ben "Snake" Schmidt – additional digital editor, engineer
- Paragon Studios, Franklin, Tennessee – string recording location ("Feed the Machine", "Let It Burn" and "Lie to Me (Denial)")
- Fred Paragano – string engineer
- Brian Calhoon – string engineer
- Jim Gray – conducting and music prep
- Ian Roberts – assistant to Rob Graves

Additional musicians

- Mark Holman – additional background vocals
- Kerrie Roberts – additional background vocals (courtesy of Reunion Records)
- Mike Seminari – additional background vocals
- William Tant – choir
- Margaret Tant – choir
- Chandler Hart – choir
- Sarah ValleyRose – choir
- Kira Hinchey – choir
- Lori Casteel – choir
- David Davidson – violin
- David Angell – violin
- Karen Winkelmann – violin
- Pamela Sixfin – violin
- Jim Grosjean – viola
- Monisa Angell – viola
- Kristin Wilkinson – viola
- Bruce Christensen – viola
- Elizabeth Lamb – viola
- Anthony Lamarchina – cello
- John Catchings – cello
- Sarighani Reist – cello
- Jack Jezioro – string bass

Artwork and design

- Joseph Anthony Baker – photography
- Red – additional photography, wardrobe styling
- John Clore – additional photography
- Jessica Katina – hair, make-up
- Beth Lee – art direction
- Tim Parker – art direction
- Tim Parker – design
- Michelle Box – A&R production
- Jason Root – A&R production

== Charts ==
=== Weekly charts ===
Chart (2011)	Peak position
US Billboard 200	2
US Digital Albums (Billboard)	2
US Independent Albums (Billboard)	1
US Top Alternative Albums (Billboard)	1
US Top Christian Albums (Billboard)	1
US Top Hard Rock Albums (Billboard)	1
US Top Rock Albums (Billboard)	1

=== Year-end charts ===
Chart (2024–2025)	Peak position
US Top Rock Albums (Billboard)	61
US Top Christian Albums (Billboard)	9
