= Innocence & Instinct =

Studio album by Red
- Released: February 10, 2009
- Recorded: 2008
- Studio: Little Big Sound, Nashville, Tennessee; Paragon Studios, Franklin, Tennessee; The Graveyard, Franklin, Tennessee
- Genre: Alternative metal; post-grunge; alternative rock; Christian rock; Christian metal; symphonic rock
- Length: 41:09
- Label: Sony, Essential
- Producer: Rob Graves

Red chronology
End of Silence (2006)	Innocence & Instinct (2009)	Until We Have Faces (2011)

Singles from Innocence & Instinct
- 1. "Fight Inside" Released: October 26, 2008; 2. "Never Be the Same" Released: December 12, 2008; 3. "Death of Me" Released: December 18, 2008; 4. "Forever" Released: July 4, 2009; 5. "Mystery of You" Released: September 15, 2009; 6. "Start Again" Released: November 9, 2009; 7. "Ordinary World" Released: February 1, 2010

Deluxe Edition

Professional ratings
Aggregate scores
Source	Rating
Album of The Year	80/100
Review scores
Source	Rating
Allmusic	4/5 stars
About.com	3.5/5 stars
Christian Music Today	3.5/5 stars
Cross Rhythms	8/10 squares
Cross Rhythms (Deluxe Edition)	9/10 squares
Jesusfreakhideout.com	4/5 stars
Jesusfreakhideout.com (Deluxe Edition)	4/5 stars
Sputnikmusic	4/5 stars

Innocence & Instinct is the second studio album by American Christian rock band Red. It was released on February 10, 2009 through Essential Records and Sony Music. It was produced by Rob Graves.

The standard edition of the album contains 10 tracks. The first single "Fight Inside" was released on October 26, 2008. The single debuted at No. 1 on the R&R Christian Rock chart. The album's second single, "Never Be the Same", was released to Christian CHR soon thereafter. On December 12, the third single from the album, "Death of Me", was released to Active, Mainstream, and Alternative Rock stations. The band also released a deluxe edition which features four bonus tracks and a DVD. Some copies of the album contain the song "Forever" as track nine instead of "Out from Under". The track "Shadows" was co-written by Breaking Benjamin guitarist/vocalist Ben Burnley. The album debuted at No. 15 on the Billboard 200, selling 39,000 copies in its first week. It was widely acclaimed by critics, who deemed it superior to the band's debut album, End of Silence, praising the songwriting, musicianship and the band's attempt to create a distinguishable sound.

The Deluxe Edition of Innocence & Instinct went as high as No. 2 on iTunes Top Selling Rock Albums Chart and No. 5 on Top-Selling Albums overall.

For the album, an alternate reality game was orchestrated by the band members. Red fans went through hidden web pages and passwords until around the time the album itself was released, when the final page was revealed, which contained a video message from the band itself, nine "treasures" (including posters, videos, and an unreleased track), and a message telling the puzzle participants not to post the contents on the internet or share them.

Drums on the album were played by Joe Rickard, the band's touring drummer. Rickard was not an official member of Red when the album was released but was made a permanent member later in 2009. Rickard departed from the band in late January 2014.

In an interview on The Daily Rock, Jasen Rauch talked about the band not wanting "Ordinary World" added to the album. He stated that Red originally arranged the song as something to play live but that the label pushed for it to be added to the album.

The album was nominated for Best Rock or Rap Gospel Album in the 2010 Grammy Awards. It won for Best Rock Album at the 41st GMA Dove Awards in 2010.

As of 2011, the album has sold over 260,000 copies.

== Track listing ==
Standard edition
No.	Title	Writer(s)	Length
1.	"Fight Inside"	Rob Graves, Bernie Herms, Jason McArthur, Jasen Rauch	4:08
2.	"Death of Me"	Graves, Rauch	4:17
3.	"Mystery of You"	Graves, McArthur, Anthony Armstrong, Rauch	3:47
4.	"Start Again"	Graves, McArthur, Rauch	4:27
5.	"Never Be the Same"	Graves, C. Todd Nielson, Mike Seminari, McArthur, Rauch	3:49
6.	"Confession (What's Inside My Head)"	Graves, McArthur, Rauch	2:44
7.	"Shadows"	Benjamin Burnley, Graves, Rauch	3:20
8.	"Ordinary World" (Duran Duran cover)	Warren Cuccurullo, Simon Le Bon, Nick Rhodes, John Taylor	4:58
9.	"Out from Under"	Graves, Richard Marx, Rauch	3:59
10.	"Take It All Away"	Graves, Rauch	5:42
Total length:			41:09

Alternate version
No.	Title	Writer(s)	Length
9.	"Forever" (Replaced "Out from Under")	Rob Graves, Richard Marx, Jasen Rauch	3:38

Deluxe edition
No.	Title	Writer(s)	Length
1.	"Intro (Canto III)"		1:30
2.	"Fight Inside"	Rob Graves, Bernie Herms, Rauch	4:08
3.	"Death of Me"	Graves, Rauch	4:17
4.	"Mystery of You"	Graves, Jason McArthur, Anthony Armstrong, Rauch	3:45
5.	"Start Again"	Graves, McArthur, Rauch	4:25
6.	"Never Be the Same"	Graves, C. Todd Nielson, Mike Seminari, McArthur, Rauch	3:46
7.	"Confession (What's Inside My Head)"	Graves, McArthur, Rauch	2:44
8.	"Shadows"	Benjamin Burnley, Graves, Rauch	3:20
9.	"Ordinary World" (Duran Duran cover)	Warren Cuccurulo, Simon Lebon, Nick Rhodes, John Bass Taylor	4:56
10.	"Out from Under"	Graves, Richard Marx, Rauch	3:58
11.	"Take It All Away"	Graves, Rauch	5:38
12.	"Overtake You"	Graves, Rauch	3:00
13.	"Forever"	Graves, Nielson, Seminari, McArthur, Rauch	3:38
14.	"Nothing and Everything" (Piano version of "Fight Inside")	Graves, Herms, Rauch	5:59
Total length:			54:56

10th Anniversary Edition bonus tracks
No.	Title	Writer(s)	Length
15.	"Death of Me (Single Version)"	Graves, Rauch	2:59
16.	"Mystery of You (Single Version)"	Graves, McArthur, A. Armstrong, Rauch	3:32
17.	"Start Again (Single Version)"	Graves, McArthur, Rauch	3:44
18.	"Ordinary World (Single Version)"	Warren Cuccurulo, Simon Lebon, Nick Rhodes, John Bass Taylor	4:12
Total length:			69:23

Japan special edition (additional tracks only)
No.	Title	Writer(s)	Length
15.	"Breathe Into Me"	Jasen Rauch, Anthony Armstrong, Rob Graves, Jason McArthur	3:34
16.	"Already Over (Acoustic)"	Rauch, Graves, McArthur	3:59
Total length:			61:29

B-side
No.	Title	Length
1.	"Condor (The Unfinished Song)"	3:29

=== Deluxe Edition DVD ===
1. "Making of Documentary"
2. "Death of Me" (music video)
3. "Behind the Scenes of Death of Me video"
4. "Photo Gallery"

=== Japan Special Edition bonus videos ===
1. "Death of Me (Video)"
2. "Breathe Into Me (Video)"
3. "Already Over (Video)"

== Personnel ==
Red

- Michael Barnes – lead vocals
- Anthony Armstrong – rhythm guitar, backing vocals
- Jasen Rauch – lead guitar, programming
- Randy Armstrong – bass, piano, backing vocals
- Joe Rickard – drums, percussion

Additional musicians

- Jack Jezioro – double bass
- Anthony LaMarchina – cello
- John Allan Catching – cello
- Kirsten Cassel – cello
- Bernie Herms – composer, string arrangements
- Travis Palmer – additional drums
- Hunter Lamb – guitar technician
- Bobby Shin – string engineer
- Jim Grosjean – viola
- Monisa Angell – viola
- David Angell – violin
- David Davidson – string arrangements, violin
- Karen Winkelmann – violin
- Pamela Sixfin – violin
- Richard Marx – composer, backing vocals

Artwork and design

- Stephanie McBrayer – art direction, stylist
- Tim Parker – art direction, design
- Megan Thompson – hair stylist, make-up
- Caleb Kuhl – photography

Production and recording

- Rob Graves – audio production, composer, digital editing, engineer, piano, producer, programming
- Ben Grosse – mixing
- Paul Pavao – mixing assistant
- Tom Baker – mastering
- Heather Hetzler – A&R
- Fred Paragano – digital editing, drum engineering, assistant engineering
- Jason McArthur – composer, executive producer
- Jason Fowler – management
