= Rob Graves =

American songwriter

- Born: May 18, 1973 (age 53)
- Genres: Electronic; alternative rock; heavy metal; pop rock; classical
- Occupations: Film scorer; songwriter; producer
- Instruments: Bass; keyboards; guitar
- Label: EMI Music Publishing
- Website: robgraves.com

Robert Douglas "Rob" Graves (born May 18, 1973) is an American songwriter, musician, and producer. He is most well known for his work with the band Red.

Graves has produced for singers and bands including Red, Pillar, Wavorly, Kerrie Roberts, and Head. He has two Grammy Award nominations for his work with the rock band Red and is a four-time Dove Award recipient. His received his first Dove in 2007 for "Breathe Into Me" (Rock Recorded Song of the Year); he received a Dove in 2009 for "Lost" (Rock Recorded Song of the Year) and most recently with Innocence & Instinct (Rock Album of the Year). He has received nine other Dove Award nominations.

Graves also wrote the score for the yet to be released film, Into the Darkness.

== Discography ==
=== Production credits ===
Year	Artist	Album	Label	Billboard 200 Peak	RIAA Certification
2003	Natalie Grant	Deeper Life	Curb	—	—
2005	Natalie Grant	Awaken	Curb	141	Gold
2006	Ana Laura	Ana Laura	Reunion	—	—
2006	Red	End of Silence	Essential	194	Gold
2007	Wavorly	Conquering the Fear of Flight	Flicker	—	—
2007	Various	WOW Hits 2008	EMI Christian Music Group	56	Gold
2008	Various	WOW Hits 2009	World Entertainment	31	Platinum
2009	Red	Innocence & Instinct	Sony Music	15	—
2009	Pillar	Confessions	Sony Music	89	—
2010	Various	WOW: New & Next	EMI Christian Music Group	—	—
2010	Kerrie Roberts	Kerrie Roberts	Sony Music	—	—
2010	All That Remains	For We Are Many	Prosthetic	10	—
2011	Red	Until We Have Faces	Sony Music	2	—
2011	Maylene and the Sons of Disaster	IV	Ferret Records	—	—
2014	Starset	Transmissions	Razor & Tie	49	—
2015	Red	Of Beauty and Rage	Sony Music	14	—
2017	Starset	Vessels	Razor & Tie	11	—
2017	Red	Gone	Essential	38	—
2020	Red	Declaration	Red Entertainment	61	—

=== Performance credits ===
Year	Artist	Album	Label	Credit	Billboard 200 Peak	RIAA Certification
2001	Newsong	The Christmas Shoes	Reunion	Guitar	113	—
2002	Plus One	Obvious	Reunion	Guitar	29	—
2002	Joy Williams	By Surprise	Reunion	Guitar, Bass, Bouzouki	—	—
2002	Plus One	Christmas	Reunion	Guitar	—	—
2003	Natalie Grant	Deeper Life	Curb	Guitar, Mandolin, Clappers	—	—
2003	Avalon	Testify to Love	Sparrow	Guitar	—	—
2003	Casting Crowns	Casting Crowns	Beach Street	Guitar	59	Platinum
2005	Casting Crowns	Lifesong	Reunion	Guitar	9	Platinum
2006	Ana Laura	Ana Laura	Reunion	Guitar, Piano, Keyboards, Vocals	—	—
2006	Red	End of Silence	Essential	Piano	194	Gold
2015	Red	Of Beauty and Rage	Essential	Piano	14	—

=== Songwriting and composer credits ===
Year	Artist	Album	Label	Billboard 200 Peak	RIAA Certification
2002	Various	WOW Hits 2003	Chordant	34	Platinum
2002	Joy Williams	By Surprise	Reunion	—	—
2005	Natalie Grant	Awaken	Curb	141	Gold
2006	Ana Laura	Ana Laura	Reunion	—	—
2006	Brian Littrell	Welcome Home	Reunion	74	—
2006	Red	End of Silence	Essential	194	Gold
2007	Wavorly	Conquering the Fear of Flight	Flicker	—	—
2007	Various	WOW Hits 2008	EMI Christian Music Group	56	Gold
2008	Michael English	The Prodigal Comes Home	Curb	—	—
2008	Various	WOW Hits 2009	Word Entertainment	31	Platinum
2009	Red	Innocence & Instinct	Sony Music	15	—
2009	Pillar	Confessions	Sony Music	89	—
2010	Various	WOW: New & Next	EMI Christian Music Group	—	—
2010	Kerrie Roberts	Kerrie Roberts	Sony Music	—	—
2010	All That Remains	...For We Are Many	Prosthetic	10	—
2011	Red	Until We Have Faces	Sony Music	2	—
2012	Richard Marx	Inside My Head	Frontiers Records	—	—
2012	All That Remains	A War You Cannot Win	Razor & Tie	—	—
2013	Halestorm	The Strange Case Of...	Atlantic Records	15	—
2014	Starset	Transmissions	Razor & Tie	49	—
2015	Red	Of Beauty and Rage	Sony Music	14	—
2017	Red	Gone	Sony Music	38	—

== Awards ==
Award	Category	Work	Role	Result
49th Annual Grammy Awards	Best Rock or Rap Gospel Album	"End of Silence"	Producer	Nominated
38th GMA Dove Awards	Rock Recorded Song of the Year	"Breathe Into Me"	Producer	Won
40th GMA Dove Awards	Rock Recorded Song of the Year	"Lost"	Producer	Won
52nd Annual Grammy Awards	Best Rock or Rap Gospel Album	Innocence & Instinct	Producer	Nominated
41st GMA Dove Awards	Rock Album of the Year	Innocence & Instinct	Producer	Won
42nd GMA Dove Awards	Rock Recorded Song of the Year	"Start Again"	Producer	Won
