= Howard Benson production discography =

The following list is a discography of production by Howard Benson, an American record producer.

== Discography ==
Year	Artist	Album
1986	T.S.O.L.	Revenge
1986	The Wigs	My Chauffeur
1987	T.S.O.L.	Hit and Run
1988	Masi	Downtown Dreamers
1989	Bang Tango	Psycho Café
1989	Pretty Boy Floyd	Leather Boyz with Electric Toyz
1989	Slammin' Watusis	Kings of Noise
1990	Child's Play	Rat Race
1990	Sanctuary	Into the Mirror Black
1991	SouthGang	Tainted Angel
1991	Tuff	What Comes Around Goes Around
1992	Little Caesar	Influence
1992	SouthGang	Group Therapy
1993	Motörhead	Bastards
1994	Bang Tango	Love After Death
1995	Kilgore Smudge	Blue Collar Solitude
1995	Motörhead	Sacrifice
1996	Motörhead	Overnight Sensation
1997	Body Count	Violent Demise: The Last Days
1997	Cellophane	Cellophane
1998	Less Than Jake	Hello Rockview
1998	Motörhead	Snake Bite Love
1998	New Meanies	Three Seeds
1998	Sepultura	Against
1998	Buck-O-Nine	Pass the Dutchie (EP)
1998	Zebrahead	Zebrahead
1998	Zebrahead	Waste of Mind
1999	Buck-O-Nine	Libido
1999	The Ernies	Meson Ray
1999	P.O.D.	The Fundamental Elements of Southtown
2000	PAX217	Twoseventeen
2000	Zebrahead	Playmate of the Year
2000	Stir	Holy Dogs
2000	P.O.D.	Any Given Sunday - Original Soundtrack ("Whatever it Takes" only)
2001	Lucky Boys Confusion	Throwing the Game
2001	P.O.D.	Satellite
2001	Reveille	Bleed The Sky
2001	Switched	Subject to Change ("Walk Away" and alternate version of "Inside" only)
2001	Bionic Jive	Armageddon Through Your Speakers
2002	Blindside	Silence
2002	The Buzzhorn	Disconnected
2002	Crazy Town	Darkhorse
2002	Skindred	Babylon
2002	Less Than Jake	Goodbye Blue & White ("I Think I Love You" only)
2002	Santana	Shaman ("America (featuring P.O.D.)" only)
2003	Adema	Unstable
2003	Depswa	Two Angels and a Dream
2003	Cold	Year of the Spider
2003	Hoobastank	The Reason
2003	Thriving Ivory	Thriving Ivory ("Alien" and "Hey Lady" only)
2003	P.O.D.	Payable on Death
2003	Systematic	Pleasure to Burn
2003	AM Radio	Radioactive
2003	Mark Ronson	Here Comes the Fuzz ("I Suck" only)
2003	P.O.D.	The Matrix Reloaded: The Album ("Sleeping Awake" only)
2004	Blindside	About a Burning Fire
2004	Grinspoon	Thrills, Kills & Sunday Pills
2004	My Chemical Romance	Three Cheers for Sweet Revenge
2004	Papa Roach	Getting Away With Murder
2004	Head Automatica	Decadence ("Beating Heart Baby" and "The Razor" only)
2004	Social Code	A Year at the Movies ("Perfect Grave" and "As Good as it Gets" only)
2004	Hazen Street	Hazen Street
2004	P.O.D.	The Passion of the Christ: Songs ("Truly Amazing" only)
2005	The All-American Rejects	Move Along
2005	Flyleaf	Flyleaf
2005	Theory of a Deadman	Gasoline
2005	The Used & My Chemical Romance	"Under Pressure"
2005	The Starting Line	Based on a True Story ("Bedroom Talk" and "The World" only)
2005	Fefe Dobson	Sunday Love ("Don't Let It Go to Your Head" and "This is My Life" only)
2005	Trust Company	True Parallels
2005	Vendetta Red	Sisters of the Red Death
2006	Daughtry	Daughtry
2006	Head Automatica	Popaganda
2006	Hoobastank	Every Man for Himself
2006	Less Than Jake	In with the Out Crowd
2006	Mêlée	Everyday Behavior (Reissue) ("The War (Alternate Version)" only)
2006	My Chemical Romance	Life on the Murder Scene ("Desert Song" only)
2006	Papa Roach	The Paramour Sessions
2006	Switched	Subject to Change (Reissue) ("Walkaway (Howard Benson Mix)" and "Inside (Howard Benson Mix)" only)
2006	Saosin	Saosin
2006	Three Days Grace	One-X
2006	As Fast As	Open Letter to the Damned ("Special" only)
2006	Mercy Fall	For the Taken
2006	The Panic Channel	One ("Why Cry" and "Blue Bruises" only)
2007	Apocalyptica	Worlds Collide ("I Don't Care" only)
2007	Mae	Singularity
2007	Mêlée	Devils & Angels
2007	Relient K	Five Score and Seven Years Ago
2007	Seether	Finding Beauty in Negative Spaces
2007	Sound the Alarm	Stay Inside
2007	Driveblind	Driveblind
2007	The Starting Line	Direction
2007	Puddle of Mudd	Famous ("Psycho" only)
2008	Gavin DeGraw	Gavin DeGraw
2008	Meriwether	Sons of Our Fathers
2008	The Red Jumpsuit Apparatus	Lonely Road
2008	Theory of a Deadman	Scars & Souvenirs
2008	Third Day	Revelation
2008	Zebrahead	Phoenix
2009	Kelly Clarkson	All I Ever Wanted
2009	Chris Cornell	"Long Gone"
2009	Creed	Full Circle
2009	Daughtry	Leave This Town
2009	Dead by Sunrise	Out of Ashes
2009	Flyleaf	Memento Mori
2009	Halestorm	Halestorm
2009	Hoobastank	For(N)ever
2009	Allison Iraheta	Just Like You ("Don't Waste the Pretty" only)
2009	Adam Lambert	For Your Entertainment ("Aftermath" only)
2009	Meg & Dia	Here, Here and Here
2009	Orianthi	Believe
2009	Single File	Common Struggles
2009	Skillet	Awake
2009	Three Days Grace	Life Starts Now
2010	Daughtry	Leave This Town: The B-Sides
2010	Fefe Dobson	Joy
2010	Hawthorne Heights	Skeletons
2010	10 Years	Feeding the Wolves
2010	Allstar Weekend	Suddenly Yours
2010	Apocalyptica	7th Symphony ("Broken Pieces" and "Not Strong Enough" only)
2010	The Maine	Black & White
2010	Ryan Star	11:59 ("Breathe" and "Start a Fire" only)
2010	Disciple	"Dear X, You Don't Own Me"
2010	Bon Jovi	Greatest Hits ("What Do You Got?" only)
2010	Orianthi	Believe (II)
2010	Flyleaf	Remember to Live ("Justice & Mercy (Violent Love Version)" only)
2010	Santana	Guitar Heaven
2011	3 Doors Down	Time of My Life
2011	Art of Dying	Vices and Virtues
2011	Daughtry	Batman: Arkham City – The Album
2011	Black Stone Cherry	Between the Devil and the Deep Blue Sea
2011	Blindside	With Shivering Hearts We Wait
2011	Kelly Clarkson	Stronger ("Breaking Your Own Heart" and "The Sun Will Rise" only)
2011	Daughtry	Break the Spell
2011	Emphatic	Damage
2011	James Durbin	Memories of a Beautiful Disaster
2011	Saliva	Under Your Skin
2011	Theory of a Deadman	The Truth Is...
2011	Three Days Grace	Lost in You EP
2011	Daughtry	ZZ Top: A Tribute from Friends ("Waitin' for the Bus / Jesus Just Left Chicago" only)
2012	Electric Touch	Never Look Back
2012	Flyleaf	New Horizons
2012	Halestorm	The Strange Case Of...
2012	Daniel Powter	Turn On the Lights
2012	P.O.D.	Murdered Love
2012	SafetySuit	These Times
2012	3 Doors Down	The Greatest Hits
2012	Fefe Dobson	Sunday Love
2013	RED	Release the Panic
2013	Skillet	Rise
2013	We as Human	We as Human
2013	Scott Stapp	Proof of Life
2013	Halestorm	Reanimate 2.0: The Covers EP
2013	Flyleaf	Who We Are (EP) ("Something Better (featuring Sonny Sandoval)" only)
2013	Stars in Stereo	Stars in Stereo ("Queen of Catastrophe" only)
2014	Rascal Flatts	Rewind ("Payback", "I Have Never Been to Memphis", "Powerful Stuff" and "Night Of Our Lives" only)
2014	Caleb Johnson	Testify
2014	Theory of a Deadman	Savages
2014	Billy Talent	Hits
2014	Halestorm	Ronnie James Dio – This Is Your Life ("Straight Through the Heart" only)
2014	Daughtry	"Utopia"
2014	Paul Freeman	That's How It Is
2015	P.O.D.	The Awakening
2015	Escape the Fate	Hate Me
2015	Hunter Hunted	Ready for You
2015	Theory of a Deadman	Angel Acoustic EP
2015	State Champs	Around the World and Back ("Hurry Up and Wait" and "Slow Burn" only)
2016	Simple Plan	Taking One for the Team
2016	Lia Marie Johnson	"DNA"
2016	Otep	Generation Doom
2016	In Flames	Battles
2017	Vamps	Underworld
2017	All That Remains	Madness
2017	Art of Anarchy	The Madness ("Changed Man" only)
2018	Of Mice & Men	Defy
2018	Diamante	Coming in Hot
2018	Three Days Grace	Outsider
2018	Blessthefall	Hard Feelings ("Sleepless in Phoenix" only)
2018	In Flames	Down, Wicked & No Good
2018	Escape the Fate	I Am Human
2018	Palisades	Erase the Pain
2018	Mayday Parade	Sunnyland ("Looks Red, Tastes Blue" and "Turn My Back" only)
2019	In Flames	I, the Mask
2019	Issues	Beautiful Oblivion
2019	JunkBunny	Junk Rock
2019	Joyous Wolf	Place in Time
2020	10 Years	Violent Allies
2020	In Flames	Clayman (20th Anniversary Edition)
2020	Three Days Grace	"Somebody That I Used to Know"
2020	Apocalyptica	"Talk to Me (featuring Lzzy Hale)"
2020	JunkBunny	Down the Rabbit Hole
2021	Apocalyptica	"White Room (featuring Jacoby Shaddix)"
2021	Diamante	American Dream
2021	Edge of Paradise	The Unknown
2021	Mitch Jones	"West Coast Tragedy" and "Emily"
2021	Jonathan Young	"Land of the Living," "Divided," "Damage Done (featuring RichaadEB)," "Rebel Yell (featuring Lukas Rossi)"
2021	Edge of Paradise	"Love Reign O'er Me"
2022	Mitch Jones	"West Coast Tragedy (Judge & Jury Mix)," "Darkness (featuring Craig Mabbitt of Escape the Fate)"
2022	Three Days Grace	Explosions
2022	Destroy Rebuild Until God Shows	Destroy Rebuild
2022	Starset	"Waiting On The Sky To Change (featuring Breaking Benjamin)"
2022	Left to Suffer	"Snake"
2023	In Flames	Foregone
2023	Kala	Diary of a Depressed Creative
2023	Left to Suffer	Noah
2023	HEIRLOOM	ROMANTICIZE
2023	Silos	Insatiable Remixes Vol. 001 (featuring BLVCK CROWZ)
2023	Jonathan Young	Children of Night
2023	Judge & Jury	"Disarm (featuring Edge of Paradise and Caleb Hyles)"
2024	Silos	Insatiable Remixes Vol. 002 (featuring Pixel Terror)
2024	Caleb Hyles	"DARKNESS BEFORE THE DAWN! (featuring Lacey Sturm and Wolves At The Gate)"
2024	Veda	"Wannabe Me," "I Breakdown"
2024	Judge & Jury	"The Urge (featuring Tyler Connolly of Theory of a Deadman)," "Euphoria (featuring Trevor McNevan of Thousand Foot Krutch)"
2024	Butcher Babies	"Sincerity"
2025	Saliva	Revelation: Retold ("Time Bomb featuring Peyton Parrish," "High On Me: Retold featuring Lauren Babic," "Horizon: Retold featuring Candlebox," "Crowd Goes Wild," and "Devil's World" only),
2025	Silos	APOCALIPS
2025	Caleb Hyles	The Darkness Before The Dawn
2025	Dead Rabbitts	Redefined
2025	My Chemical Romance	Three Cheers For Sweet Revenge 2025 Deluxe Edition
2025	Bobby Amaru & Veda	"Somebody That I Used To Know," "Just Pretend," "Somewhere I Belong," "Somebody's Watching Me," "Last Resort"
2025	LYLVC	Barely Human
2025	Saliva	"They Don't Really Care About Us," "Hit 'Em Where It Hurts," "Too Broke To Fix (featuring the Founder)"
2025	Silos	APOCALIPS 2.0 EP
2025	Three Days Grace	Alienation
2025	Butcher Babies	Insincerity EP
2025	Dream Beard	"SPRAY (featuring Sada Baby)"
2025	Fallen Within	"Worlds Apart (featuring Saliva)"
2025	Thrower	"Happy When We're Bleeding" (featuring Craig mabbitt of Escape the Fate)
2026	Dream Beard	"VOID" (featuring Sada Baby)
2026	12 Stones	"Golden Child"
2026	Bobby Amaru & Veda	"Running Up That Hill"
2026	Butcher Babies	"Lost In Your Touch"
2026	Alien Ant Farm	"Reasons"
2026	LYLVC	"Starless" (featuring Bobby Amaru of Saliva)
2026	Stitched Up Heart	"CANNIBAL" (featuring Butcher Babies)
2026	12 Stones	"Worlds So Cold" (featuring Lyric Noel)
2026	Butcher Babies	"Black Dove"
2026	Dream Beard	"HIGH LIFE" (featuring Dropout Kings)
2026	Saliva	"Cope" (featuring Trevor McNevan of Thousand Foot Krutch)
2026	Emily Wolfe	"Crave Me"
2026	Emily Wolfe	"Lips" (featuring Eagles Of Death Metal)
2026	Butcher Babies	"Blame It On The Wind"
2026	Caleb Hyles	"Not Your Savior (Acoustic)
2026	Stitched Up Heart	"MEDUSA"
2026	Hoobastank	"How Do You Sleep?"
2026	Earshot	"Love Left"
2026	Butcher Babies	"Leaving California"
2026	Alien Ant Farm	"Gaslighter"
2026	Butcher Babies	"NIGHTBLOOM"
2026	Dream Beard	"HOLLYWOOD TONIC"
2026	GORODA	"Break Free" (featuring Ronnie Winter The Red Jumpsuit Apparatus & Bobby Amaru of Saliva)
2026	Bobby Amaru	"Given Up"
2026	Morning In May	"Homicide Stage" (featuring Ronnie Winter of The Red Jumpsuit Apparatus)
