= Neil Sanderson production and songwriting discography =

The following lists are a discography of production and songwriting by Neil Sanderson, a Canadian musician.

== Production discography ==
| Year | Artist | Album | Songs |
|---|---|---|---|
| 2020 | Three Days Grace | Non-album singles | "Somebody That I Used to Know" |
| 2021 | Jonathan Young | Non-album singles | "Land of the Living," "Divided," "Damage Done (ft. RichaadEB)," "Rebel Yell (ft. Lukas Rossi)" |
| 2021 | DIAMANTE | American Dream | "American Dream," "Ghost Myself," "Serves You Right," "Obvious," "Unlovable," "Wake Up Call," "Unfuck You," "I Love Myself For Hating You," "Iris," "Hopeless" |
| 2021 | Citizen Soldier | This Is Your Sign, Pt 1 | "Face to Face," "Isolate," "Invisible" |
| 2021 | Edge of Paradise | The Unknown | "Love Reign O'er Me" |
| 2021 | Mitch Jones | Broken | "West Coast Tragedy", "Emily" |
| 2022 | Mitch Jones | Non-album singles | "West Coast Tragedy (Judge & Jury Mix)," "Darkness (ft. Craig Mabbitt)" |
| 2022 | Edge of Paradise | Non-album singles | "Go Higher" |
| 2022 | STARSET | Non-album singles | "Waiting on the Sky to Change (ft. Breaking Benjamin)" |
| 2022 | Left to Suffer | Noah | "Snake" |
| 2022 | The Standstills | Shockwave | "Reset Party," "Motherlode," "Pretty Little Broken Thing," "Get Right," "Nervous Smile," "Valhalla," "Maple Sugar," "Heavy Is The Reason," "Shockwave," "Interlude," "Back To You," "Hell Or A Highway" |
| 2023 | KALA | Diary of a Depressed Creative | "Different," "Better Off," "Broken Hearted," "Lately," "Bleeding," "Misery," "Numb," "Play Dead," "Love//Hate," "Not Alone," "Nothing," "Changing" |
| 2023 | Lindsey Stirling | Non-album single | "Kashmir" |
| 2023 | HEIRLOOM | ROMANTICIZE | "WE ARE NOT THE SAME," "[HYPER]VIGILANT," "ROMANTICIZE," "WANDERLUST," "PASSENGER SEAT," "[HIVE]MINDREADER," "BROADER SCOPE," "IN A BLINK," "RUN FROM ME," "SUFFER ALL THE SAME" |
| 2023 | Silos | Insatiable | "Insatiable (BLVCK CROWZ Remix)," "If I Fall - Ray Garrison Future Rave Remix," "Mind Eraser - Ray Garrison Cyberpunk Remix" |
| 2023 | Jonathan Young | Children of Night | "Eye of the Storm," "God of Greed," "Oceangrave," "Children of Night," "Wolf Within," "Witch Hunter," "Drinking Blood," "Fight the Tide," "Army of the Damned," "Why Keep Heaven Waiting," "Battlecry," "Speak to the Dead" |
| 2023 | Judge & Jury | Non-album singles | "Disarm (ft. Caleb Hyles)," "Eventually" |
| 2024 | Silos | Non-album singles | "Insatiable (Pixel Terror Remix)," "Mind Eraser (Acoustic Version)," "Gaslight (Ray Garrison Dance Remix)," "Lighthouse (Ray Garrison Booty Bass Remix)," "If I Fall (Traveler Remix)" |
| 2024 | Veda | Non-album singles | "Wannabe Me", "I Breakdown" |
| 2024 | Judge & Jury | Non-album singles | "The Urge (ft. Tyler Connolly of Theory of a Deadman)," "Euphoria (ft. Trevor McNevan of Thousand Foot Krutch)" |
| 2024 | Butcher Babies | Non-album singles | "Sincerity" |
| 2025 | Saliva | Revelation: Retold | "Time Bomb (ft. Peyton Parrish)," "High On Me: Retold (ft. Lauren Babic)," "Horizon: Retold (ft. Candlebox)," "Crowd Goes Wild," and "Devil's World" |
| 2025 | Silos | Apocalips | "IF I FALL! (ft. From Ashes to New)," "Save Tonight," "Black Mold (ft. Craig Mabbitt of Escape the Fate)," "November," "Mind Eraser," "Insatiable (ft. Jay Gordon of Orgy)," "One More Kiss," "Gaslight (ft. The Haunt)," "Goodbye Letter," "The Answer," "Lighthouse (ft. Shifty of Crazy Town)," "Impossible," "If I Fall" |
| 2025 | Caleb Hyles | The Darkness Before The Dawn | "FEAR (ft. Adelitas Way)," "Darkness Before The Dawn (ft. Lacey Sturm)," "The Memory (ft. Ashes Remain)," "Between The Truth And The Lie," "UNPARALYZED (ft. Trevor McNevan of Thousand Foot Krutch)," "Never Back Down (ft. Manafest)," "Idolize," "Not Your Savior," "Just One Step (ft. Jonathan Young)," "Manufactured Heart" |
| 2025 | Dead Rabbitts | Redefined | "Artificial Gods (ft. HIGHSOCIETY)," "T/R/A/P/P/E/D," "Oxygen (ft. Fronzilla of Attila)," "Crowned Clown," "Hellscape (ft. Wednesday 13 and Stitched Up Heart)," "Mistake (ft. Lauren Babic)," "Misleading," "Understand," "Redefined," "Meat HOOK," "ConsPIRACY" |
| 2025 | Saliva | Non-album singles | "They Don't Really Care About Us," "Hit 'Em Where It Hurts," "Too Broke To Fix (featuring the Founder)" |
| 2025 | Bobby Amaru & Veda | Non-album singles | "Somebody That I Used To Know," "Just Pretend," "Somewhere I Belong," "Somebody's Watching Me," "Last Resort" |
| 2025 | Silos | APOCALIPS 2.0 (feat. HIGHSOCIETY) | "BL4CK_M0LD (HIGHSOCIETY Remix)," "iF_i_FaLL (HIGHSOCIETY Remix)," "Gaslight.exe (HIGHSOCIETY Remix)" |
| 2025 | Butcher Babies | Insincerity | "Sincerity (You Were Never There For Me)" feat. Saliva, Lyric Noel, and Harper, "Sincerity (The War You Started)" feat. Kinda Happy, ORIGINAL SELF, and Sleeping In Silence, "Sincerity (Now I See It All So Clear)" feat. Gina Fritz, Chad Kowal, and neversleep., "Sincerity (You Fooled Me Twice)" feat. Ben Jewell, Erik "Shredz" Jenson and Cage Fight, "Sincerity (I Know I Wasn't Perfect)" feat. Shawn O'Donnell and ALYXX |
| 2025 | Fallen Within | Non-album singles | "Worlds Apart (featuring Saliva)" |
| 2025 | Thrower | Non-album singles | "Happy When We're Bleeding (featuring Escape the Fate)" |
| 2025 | Dream Beard | Non-album singles | "SPRAY (featuring Sada Baby)" |
| 2026 | Dream Beard | Non-album singles | "VOID (featuring Sada Baby)" |
| 2026 | 12 Stones | Non-album singles | "Golden Child" |
| 2026 | Bobby Amaru & Veda | Non-album singles | "Running Up That Hill" |
| 2026 | Butcher Babies | Non-album singles | "Lost In Your Touch" |
| 2026 | Alien Ant Farm | Non-album singles | "Reasons" |
| 2026 | LYLVC | Non-album singles | "Starless (featuring Bobby Amaru of Saliva)" |
| 2026 | Stitched Up Heart | Medusa | "CANNIBAL" (featuring Butcher Babies) |
| 2026 | 12 Stones | N/A | "Worlds So Cold" (featuring Lyric Noel) |
| 2026 | Butcher Babies | NIGHTBLOOM | "Black Dove" |
| 2026 | Dream Beard | N/A | "HIGH LIFE" (featuring Dropout Kings) |
| 2026 | Saliva | Breaking Through | "Cope" (featuring Trevor McNevan of Thousand Foot Krutch) |
| 2026 | Emily Wolfe | N/A | "Crave Me" |
| 2026 | Emily Wolfe | N/A | "Lips" (featuring Eagles Of Death Metal) |
| 2026 | Butcher Babies | NIGHTBLOOM | "Blame It On The Wind" |
| 2026 | Caleb Hyles | N/A | "Not Your Savior (Acoustic) |
| 2026 | Earshot | N/A | "Love Left" |
| 2026 | Butcher Babies | NIGHTBLOOM | "Leaving California" |
| 2026 | Alien Ant Farm | N/A | "Gaslighter" |
| 2026 | Butcher Babies | NIGHTBLOOM | "NIGHTBLOOM" |
| 2026 | Dream Beard | N/A | "HOLLYWOOD TONIC" |
| 2026 | GORODA | N/A | "Break Free" (featuring Ronnie Winter of The Red Jumpsuit Apparatus & Bobby Amaru of Saliva) |
| 2026 | Bobby Amaru | N/A | "Given Up" |
| 2026 | Morning In May | N/A | "Homicide Stage" (featuring Ronnie Winter of The Red Jumpsuit Apparatus) |

== Songwriting discography ==
| Year | Artist | Album | Song |
|---|---|---|---|
| 2003 | Three Days Grace | Three Days Grace | "Are You Ready," "Born Like This," "Burn," "Drown," "Home," "I Hate Everything About You," "Just Like You," "Let You Down," "Now or Never," "Overrated," "Scared," "Take Me Under," "Wake Up" |
| 2005 | Bone Crusher, Three Days Grace | XXX: State of the Union Album | "Just Like Wylin'" |
| 2006 | Three Days Grace | One-X | "Animal I Have Become," "Get Out Alive," "Gone Forever," "It's All Over," "Let It Die," "Never Too Late," "On My Own," "One X," "Over and Over," "Pain," "Riot," "Time of Dying" |
| 2009 | Three Days Grace | Life Starts Now | "Bitter Taste," "Break," "Bully," "Goin' Down," "Last to Know," "Life Starts Now," "Lost in You," "No More," "Someone Who Cares," "The Good Life," "Without You," "World so Cold" |
| 2010 | My Darkest Days | My Darkest Days | "Every Lie" |
| 2012 | Three Days Grace | Transit of Venus | "Anonymous," "Broken Glass," "Chalk Outline," "Expectations," "Give Me a Reason," "Happiness," "Misery Loves My Company," "Operate," "Sign Of The Times," "The High Road," "Time That Remains," "Unbreakable Heart" |
| 2013 | Tim Hicks | Throw Down | "Get By," "Hell Raisin' Good Time," "Nothing On You And Me" |
| 2015 | Three Days Grace | Human | "Human Race," "I Am Machine," "Landmine," "Nothing's Fair In Love and War," "One Too Many," "Painkiller," "So What," "Tell Me Why," "The End Is Not the Answer," "The Real You," "Car Crash," " Fallen Angel" |
| 2015 | MadSage | Non-album singles | "I hate you" |
| 2015 | Jesse Labelle | Non-album singles | "You Left Me" |
| 2016 | The Abrams | The Abrams | "Still in Love" |
| 2017 | Lil Peep | Castles II | "witchblades" |
| 2018 | Three Days Grace | Outsider | "Chasing The First Time," "I Am an Outsider," "Infra-Red," "Love Me Or Leave Me," "Me Against You," "Nothing To Lose But You," "Right Left Wrong," "Strange Days," "The Abyss," "The Mountain," "The New Real," "Villain I'm Not" |
| 2019 | Matthew Spencer | Non-album singles | "Shocked and Betrayed (Instrumental)" |
| 2021 | Jonathan Young | Non-album singles | "Land of the Living," "Divided," "Damage Done (ft. RichaadEB)" |
| 2021 | DIAMANTE | American Dream | "Ghost Myself," "Obvious," "Serves You Right" |
| 2021 | BIGHEAD | Emotions | "Emotions" |
| 2022 | Manafest | I Run with Wolves | "Forever," "UPS AND DOWNS" |
| 2022 | Citizen Soldier | This Is Your Sign, Pt 1 | "Numb to Everything" |
| 2022 | Three Days Grace | Explosions | "A Scar Is Born," "Chain of Abuse," "Champion," "Explosions," "I Am the Weapon," "Lifetime," "Neurotic (ft. Lukas Rossi)," "No Tomorrow," "Redemption," "So Called Life," "Someone To Talk To (ft. Apocalyptica)," "Souvenirs" |
| 2022 | Jonathan Young | Non-album singles | "Wolf Within (ft. Caleb Hyles)" |
| 2022 | Caleb Hyles | Non-album singles | "Just One Step (ft. Jonathan Young)", "Idolize" |
| 2022 | The Standstills | Shockwave | "Shockwave," "Back To You," "Get Right," "Heavy Is The Reason," "Hell Or The Highway," "Maple Sugar," "Motherlode," "Nervous Smile," "Pretty Little Broken Thing," "Reset Party," "Valhalla" |
| 2022 | HEIRLOOM | Romanticize | "WE ARE NOT THE SAME", "PASSENGER SEAT (ft. Lauren Babic)" |
| 2023 | Through Fire | Devil's Got You Dreamin' | "Devolution" |
| 2023 | Left to Suffer | Snake | "Noah" |
| 2023 | HEIRLOOM | Romanticize | "ROMANTICIZE" |
| 2023 | Judge & Jury | Non-album singles | "Eventually" |
| 2024 | RoZY | Non-album singles | "Crybaby" |
| 2024 | Judge & Jury | Non-album singles | "The Urge (ft. Tyler Connolly of Theory of a Deadman," "Euphoria (ft. Trevor McNevan of Thousand Foot Krutch" |
| 2024 | Butcher Babies | Non-album singles | "Sincerity" |
| 2024 | VOILA | Glass Half Empty (Part I) | "The Autopsy of You & Me" |
| 2024 | Three Days Grace | Alienation | "Mayday," |
| 2025 | Three Days Grace | Alienation | "Dominate," "Apologies," "Mayday," "Kill Me Fast," "In Waves," "Alienation," "Never Ordinary (featuring Lindsey Stirling)," "Deathwish," "Don't Wanna Go Home Tonight," "In Cold Blood," "In Cold Blood," "The Power," "Another Relapse" |
| 2025 | Butcher Babies | Insincerity | "Sincerity (You Were Never There For Me)" feat. Saliva, Lyric Noel, and Harper, "Sincerity (The War You Started)" feat. Kinda Happy, ORIGINAL SELF, and Sleeping In Silence, "Sincerity (Now I See It All So Clear)" feat. Gina Fritz, Chad Kowal, and neversleep., "Sincerity (You Fooled Me Twice)" feat. Ben Jewell, Erik "Shredz" Jenson and Cage Fight, "Sincerity (I Know I Wasn't Perfect)" feat. Shawn O'Donnell and ALYXX |
| 2026 | Alien Ant Farm | N/A | "Reasons" |
