= Joe Rickard =

American record producer and musician

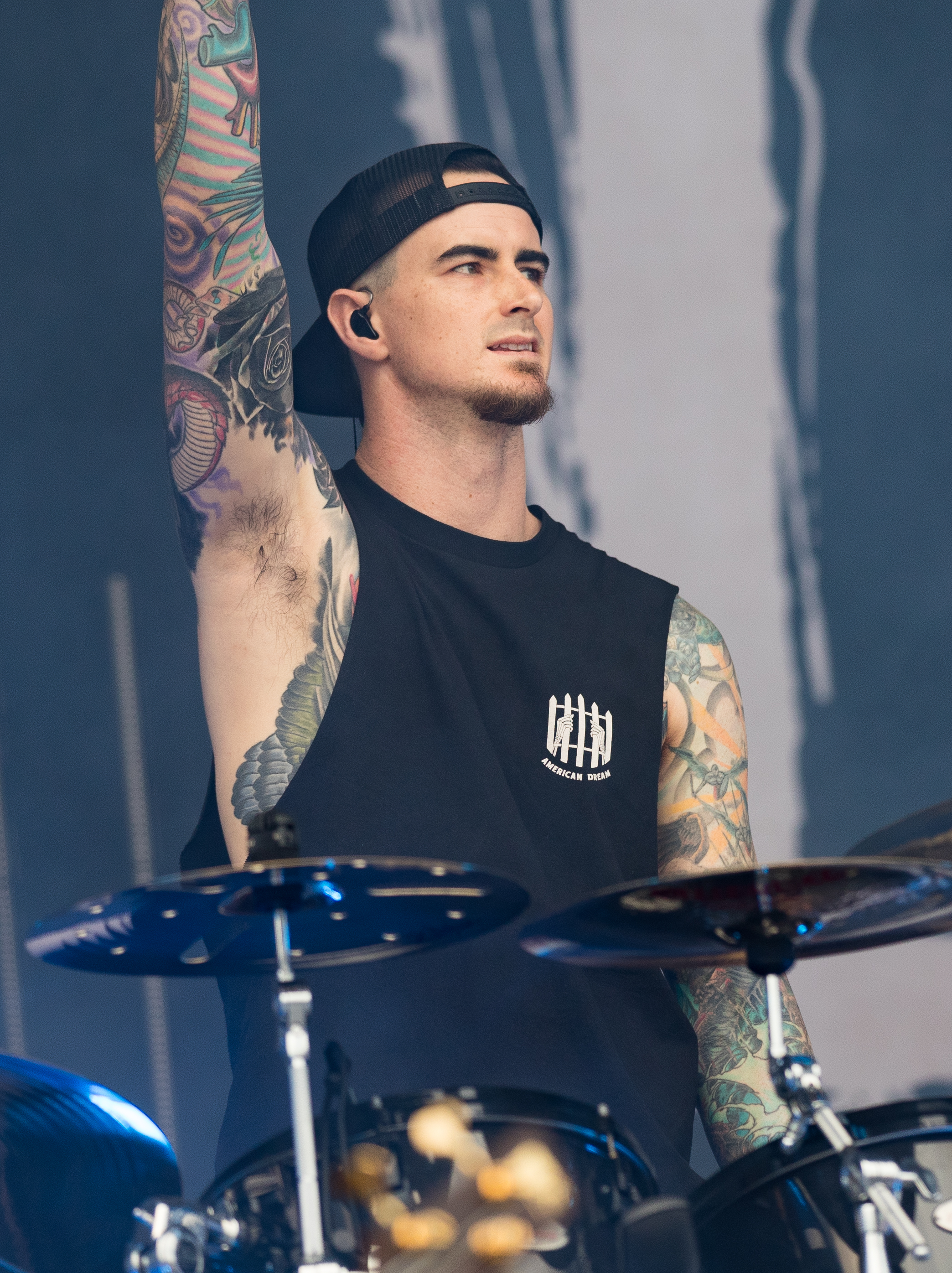
- Rickard with In Flames in 2017

Background information
- Born: Joseph Robert Rickard; April 12, 1987 (age 39)
- Genres: Alternative metal; melodic death metal; alternative rock; Christian rock
- Occupations: Musician; record producer; engineer
- Instruments: Drums; keyboards
- Years active: 2004–present
- Formerly of: Red; In Flames
- Website: joerickardproductions.com

Joe Rickard (born April 12, 1987) is an American record producer, mixing engineer, and drummer. He was a member of the rock band Red from 2008 through 2014 and Swedish heavy metal band In Flames from 2016 through 2019. He then began primarily writing, mixing and producing, often working with music producer Howard Benson.

== Biography ==
Rickard is the former drummer for Swedish heavy metal band In Flames and Grammy Award-nominated band Red. He has performed on The Tonight Show with Jay Leno and The Conan O'Brien Show, and was voted one of the Up & Coming Drummers of 2010 by Modern Drummer Magazine. He also recorded all of the live drums for Mötley Crüe's 2019 biographical film, The Dirt. In November 2007, Rickard replaced Hayden Lamb as the drummer of Red. In 2014, after spending six years, three albums and numerous tours with Red, Rickard decided to leave the band. He joined Swedish metal band In Flames in 2016. Rickard was the drummer for In Flames until 2019.

After touring in several bands and performing on various albums, Rickard has now become a full time producer, mixer, and writer. He has worked with Three Days Grace, Apocalyptica, 10 Years, Starset, Another Day Dawns, Love And Death, Brian Welch, Diamante, Keith Wallen of Breaking Benjamin, Rob Graves, Trevor McNevan of Thousand Foot Krutch, Manafest, The Wedding, and Islander. He also works with music producer Howard Benson on a regular basis, mixing several of his recent releases.

== Discography ==
Year	Artist	SONG / ALBUM	Role
2026	Dream Beard	VOID (featuring Sada Baby)	Mixing Engineer, Atmos Mixer
2026	Stitched Up Heart	GLITCH BITCH (featuring Conquer Divide)	Mixing Engineer, Atmos Mixer
2026	Stitched Up Heart	CANNIBAL (featuring Heidi Shepard of Butcher Babies)	Mixing Engineer, Atmos Mixer
2026	Stitched Up Heart	BEAST (featuring Nonpoint)	Mixing Engineer, Atmos Mixer
2026	Stitched Up Heart	MEET ME AFTER LIFE (featuring NOAPOLOGY)	Mixing Engineer, Atmos Mixer
2026	Alien Ant Farm	Actitud	Mixing Engineer, Atmos Mixer
2026	Alien Ant Farm	Reasons	Mixing Engineer, Atmos Mixer
2026	12 Stones	Golden Child	Mixing Engineer, Programming, Atmos Mixer
2026	12 Stones	World So Cold (featuring Lyric Noel)	Mixing Engineer, Programming, Atmos Mixer
2026	Veda & Bobby Amaru	Running Up That Hill	Producer, Mixing Engineer, Programming, Atmos Mixer
2026	Lyric Noel	Shades of Black	Atmos Mixing
2026	LYLVC	Starless	Producer, Drum Programming, Mixing Engineer, Synthesizer Programming, Atmos Mixer
2026	Dream Beard	HIGH LIFE (featuring Dropout Kings)	Atmos Mixer
2026	Saliva	Cope (featuring Trevor McNevan of Thousand Foot Krutch)	Mixing Engineer, Atmos Mixer
2026	Saliva	Sadistic Love	Mixing Engineer, Atmos Mixer
2026	Emily Wolfe	Crave Me	Mixing Engineer, Atmos Mixer
2026	Emily Wolfe	Lips (featuring Eagles of Death Metal)	Mixing Engineer, Atmos Mixer
2026	Caleb Hyles	Not Your Savior (Acoustic)	Producer, Mixing Engineer, Atmos Mixer
2026	Stitched Up Heart	"MEDUSA"	Mixing Engineer, Atmos Mixer
2026	Hoobastank	"How Do You Sleep?"	Co-Producer, Mixing Engineer, Atmos Mixer
2026	Saliva	"Edge of a Knife"	Mixing Engineer, Atmos Mixer
2026	GORODA	"Do Something Wrong" (featuring Bobby Amaru of Saliva)	Mastering, Mixing Engineer, Programming, Atmos Mixer
2026	Saliva	"Longshot" (featuring Johnny Van Zant of Lynyrd Skynyrd)	Atmos Mixer
2026	Emily Wolfe	"Power"	Mixing Engineer
2026	Saliva	"Breaking Through"	Programming (tracks 1, 3) Mastering (track 1) Mixing Engineer (tracks 1 - 12 ) Atmos Mixer (tracks 1 - 13)
2026	Earshot	"Love Left"	Mixing Engineer, Programming, Atmos Mixer
2026	Alien Ant Farm	"Gaslighter"	Mixing Engineer, Programming, Atmos Mixer
2026	Butcher Babies	"NIGHTBLOOM"	Co-Producer (tracks 1-10) Mixing Engineer (tracks 1-10) Programming (tracks 1-7 - 9 & 10) Atmos Mixer (tracks 1-10)
2026	Dream Beard	"HOLLYWOOD TONC"	Atmos Mixer
2026	GORODA	"Break Free"	Mixing Engineer, Programming, Surround Mixing Engineer
2026	Emily Wolfe	"Kill Me With A Kiss"	Mixing Engineer
2026	Bobby Amaru	"Given Up"	Producer, Mixing Engineer, Programming, Atmos Mixer
2026	Morning In May	"Homicide Stage"	Mixing Engineer, Programming, Surround Mixing Engineer
2025	Limp Bizkit	"Making Love To Morgan Wallen"	Immerse Mixing Engineer
2025	Three Days Grace	Alienation	Assistant Engineer
2025	Three Days Grace	Apologies	Assistant Engineer, Composer
2025	Starset	Silos	Producer, Mixer, Recording Engineer, Programmer, Studio Drummer
2025	Saliva	Revelation: Retold	Producer (tracks 1-5) Mixing Engineer (tracks 1-5) Programming (tracks 1 & 2) Recording Engineer (tracks 2 & 3) Atmos Mixer (tracks 1 - 5)
2025	Silos	APOCALIPS	Mixing Engineer, Atmos Mixer
2025	Silos	APOCALIPS 2.0	Mixing Engineer, Atmos Mixer
2025	Caleb Hyles	The Darkness Before The Dawn	Songwriter (track 6) Producer (tracks 1, 3, 4, 5, 6, 8, 10) Drums (tracks 1, 3, 4, 8, 10) Mixing Engineer (tracks 1 - 10) Programming (tracks 1, 3, 4, 5, 6, 8, 10) Recording Engineer (track 5) Vocal Engineer (track 6) Atmos Mixer (tracks 1 - 10)
2025	Dead Rabbitts	Redefined	Producer, Mixing Engineer, Programming (track 10), Atmos Mixer
2025	Saliva	They Don't Really Care About Us	Producer, Mixing Engineer, Programming, Recording Engineer, Atmos Mixer, Vocal Engineer
2025	Saliva	Hit 'Em Where It Hurts	Mastering Engineer, Mixing Engineer, Programming, Atmos Mixer
2025	Saliva	Too Broke To Fix	Mixing Engineer, Programming, Atmos Mixer
2025	Veda & Bobby Amaru	Somebody That I Used To Know	Producer, Mastering Engineer, Mixing Engineer, Atmos Mixer
2025	Veda & Bobby Amaru	Just Pretend	Producer, Mastering Engineer, Mixing Engineer, Programming, Atmos Mixer
2025	Veda & Bobby Amaru	Somewhere I Belong	Producer, Mastering Engineer, Mixing Engineer, Programming, Atmos Mixer
2025	Veda & Bobby Amaru	Somebody's Watching Me	Producer, Mastering Engineer, Mixing Engineer, Programming, Atmos Mixer
2025	Veda & Bobby Amaru	Last Resort	Producer, Mixing Engineer, Programming, Atmos Mixer
2025	LYLVC	Barely Human	Atmos Mixer
2025	Butcher Babies	Insincerity	Producer, Mastering Engineer, Mixing Engineer, Programming, Atmos Mixer
2025	Dream Beard	SPRAY (featuring Sada Baby)	Atmos Mixer
2025	Fallen Within	Worlds Apart	Mastering Engineer, Mixing Engineer, Programming, Atmos Mixer
2025	Stitched Up Heart	SICK SICK SICK (featuring Lauren Babic, Eyes Set To Kill)	Mixing Engineer, Atmos Mixer
2025	Thrower	Happy When We're Bleeding (featuring Craig Mabbitt, Escape the Fate)	Mixing Engineer, Programming, Atmos Mixer
2025	Alien Ant Farm	Bad Attitude	Mixing Engineer, Atmos Mixer
2024	Ashes Remain	"Lost Light"	Mixer, Recording Engineer
2024	Ashes Remain	"Don’t Let Go"	Mixer, Recording Engineer
2024	Three Days Grace	"Mayday"	Assistant Recording Engineer
2024	Starset	"Dystopia"	Producer, Programmer, Recording Engineer, Songwriter
2024	Starset	"TokSik"	Producer, Programmer, Engineer
2024	Starset	"DEGENERATE"	Producer, Mixer, Engineer, Programmer
2024	Starset	"Brave New World"	Producer, Programmer, Engineer
2024	Breaking Benjamin	"Awaken"	Recording Engineer, Vocal Recording Engineer
2024	Manafest	Learning How To Be Human	Producer, Songwriter
2024	POKMINDSET	"JEK"	Mixer, Mastering
2024	The Black Moods	"Heaven"	Mixer, Mastering, Engineer
2024	Silos	Gaslight	Mixing Engineer, Atmos Mixer
2024	Silos	Insatiable Remixes, Vol. 002	Mixing Engineer, Atmos Mixer
2024	Silos	Black Mold (featuring Craig Mabbitt of Escape The Fate)	Mixing Engineer, Atmos Mixer
2024	Caleb Hyles	Never Back Down	Songwriter, Producer, Mixing Engineer, Programming, Vocal Engineer
2024	Caleb Hyles	DARKNESS BEFORE THE DAWN!	Producer, Programming, Recording Engineer, Mixing Engineer, Atmos Mixer
2024	Caleb Hyles	UNPARALYZED (featuring Trevor McNevan of Thousand Foot Krutch)	Producer, Programming Mixing Engineer, Recording Engineer, Atmos Mixer
2024	Dead Rabbitts	Mistake (featuring Lauren Babic)	Producer, Mixing Engineer, Atmos Mixer
2024	Dead Rabbitts	Oxygen (featuring Chris Fronzak of Attila)	Producer, Mixing Engineer, Atmos Mixer
2024	Veda	Wannabe Me	Producer, Drums, Mixing Engineer, Atmos Mixer
2024	Veda	I Breakdown	Producer, Mixing Engineer, Programming, Atmos Mixer
2024	Judge & Jury	The Urge (featuring Tyler Connolly of Theory of a Deadman)	Co-Producer, Mixing Engineer, Atmos Mixer
2024	Judge & Jury	Euphoria (featuring Trevor McNevan of Thousand Foot Krutch)	Producer, Mixing Engineer, Atmos Mixer
2024	Saliva	Time Bomb (featuring Peyton Parrish)	Producer, Mixing Engineer, Programming, Atmos Mixer
2024	Butcher Babies	Sincerity	Producer, Mixing Engineer, Programming, Atmos Mixer
2023	Red	Rated R	Co-writer, Mixer
2023	Kala	Diary of a Depressed Creative	Producer (track 7), Mixer, Atmos Mixer
2023	In Flames	Foregone	Mixer, Programmer, Studio Keyboards
2023	Caleb Hyles	Darkness Before The Dawn (featuring Lacey Strum)	Mixing Engineer, Atmos Mixer
2023	Left to Suffer	Noah	Atmos Mixer,
2023	HEIRLOOM	ROMANTICIZE	Mixing Engineer, Atmos Mixer
2023	Silos	Insatiable	Mixing Engineer, Atmos Mixer
2023	Silos	Insatiable Remixes, Vol 001	Mixing Engineer, Atmos Mixer
2023	Silos	Lighthouse (featuring Crazy Town)	Mixing Engineer, Atmos Mixer
2023	Jonathan Young	Children of Night	Mixing Engineer, Atmos Mixer
2023	Judge & Jury	Disarm (featuring Edge Of Paradise, Caleb Hyles)	Mixing Engineer, Programming, Atmos Mixer
2023	Judge & Jury	Eventually	Mixing Engineer
2022	Mitch Jones	West Coast Tragedy (Judge & Jury Mix) (featuring Kala	Mixing Engineer
2022	Mitch Jones	Darkness (featuring Craig Mabbitt of Escape the Fate)	Mixing Engineer
2022	Jonathan Young	Wolf Within (featuring Caleb Hyles)	Mixing Engineer, Atmos Mixer
2022	Jonathan Young	Children of Night (featuring Barry Stock of Three Days Grace)	Mixing Engineer, Atmos Mixer
2022	Caleb Hyles	Just One Step	Mixing Engineer, Atmos Mixer
2022	Caleb Hyles	Idolize	Mixing Engineer, Atmos Mixer
2022	Starset & Breaking Benjamin	"Waiting on the Sky to Change"	Producer, Mixer, Atmos Mixer
2022	HEIRLOOM	WE ARE NOT THE SAME	Mixing Engineer
2022	HEIRLOOM	PASSENGER SEAT	Mixing Engineer
2022	Left to Suffer	Snake	Mixing Engineer
2022	Kala	Broken Hearted	Mixing Engineer
2021	Keith Wallen	This World or the Next	Producer, Mixer, Co-writer, Studio Drummer, Engineer, Programmer, Editor
2021	Starset	Horizons	Producer, Mixer
2021	Love and Death	Perfectly Preserved	Producer, Mixer
2021	Jonathan Young	Land of the Living	Mixing Engineer, Atmos Mixer
2021	Jonathan Young	Divided	Mixing Engineer
2021	Jonathan Young	Damage Done (featuring RichaadEB)	Mixing Engineer, Atmos Mixer
2021	Jonathan Young	Rebel Yell (featuring Lukas Rossi)	Mixing Engineer
2021	Edge Of Paradise	Love Reign O'er Me	Atmos Mixer
2020	Bella Thorne	"SFB"	Mixer
2020	HOUNDS	"Shake Me Up"	Mixer
2020	Apocalyptica	"Talk to Me" (featuring Lzzy Hale)	Mixer
2020	10 Years	Violent Allies	Mixer
2020	Another Day Dawns	Stranger	Producer, Mixer, Co-writer, Engineer, Programmer, Editor
2020	Diamante	American Dream	Mixer
2020	JunkBunny	Down the Rabbit Hole	Mixer
2020	Three Days Grace	"Somebody That I Used to Know"	Mixer
2020	Red	Declaration	Co-writer, Mixer, Mastering
2019	Joyous Wolf	Place in Time	Mixer
2019	Issues	Beautiful Oblivion	Co-editor
2019	Starset	Divisions	Producer, Co-writer, Studio Drummer, Engineer, Programmer, Editor
2019	In Flames	I, the Mask	Studio Drummer, Drum Programmer
2018	Diamante	Coming in Hot	Studio Drummer, Drum Programmer, percussion
2018	Palisades	Erase The Pain	Mixer
2017	All That Remains	Madness	Drum Programmer
2017	Warbringer	Woe to the Vanquished	Drum Technician
2017	Starset	Vessels	Studio Drummer, Editor
2017	Red	Gone	Co-writer, Studio Drummer
2016	In Flames	Battles	Studio Drummer, Drum Programmer
2015	Islander	"Wake Up!" (featuring Jonathan Davis)	Producer, Co-mixer Co-writer, Studio Drummer, Programmer, Editor
2014	Caleb Johnson	Testify	Studio Drummer
2014	Starset	Transmissions	Co-writer, Studio Drummer, programmer
2013	Love and Death	Between Here & Lost ("Paralyzed" only)	Studio Drummer, Engineer
2013	Red	Release the Panic	Co-writer, Studio Drummer, programmer
2012	Disciple	O God Save Us All	Editor
2011	Red	Until We Have Faces	Co-writer, Studio Drummer
2010	Kerrie Roberts	Kerrie Roberts	Studio Drummer, Percussion
2009	Red	Innocence & Instinct	Studio Drummer
2009	Pillar	Confessions	Studio Drummer
2007	The Wedding	Polarity	Studio Drummer
