= Judge & Jury Records =

American record label and production company

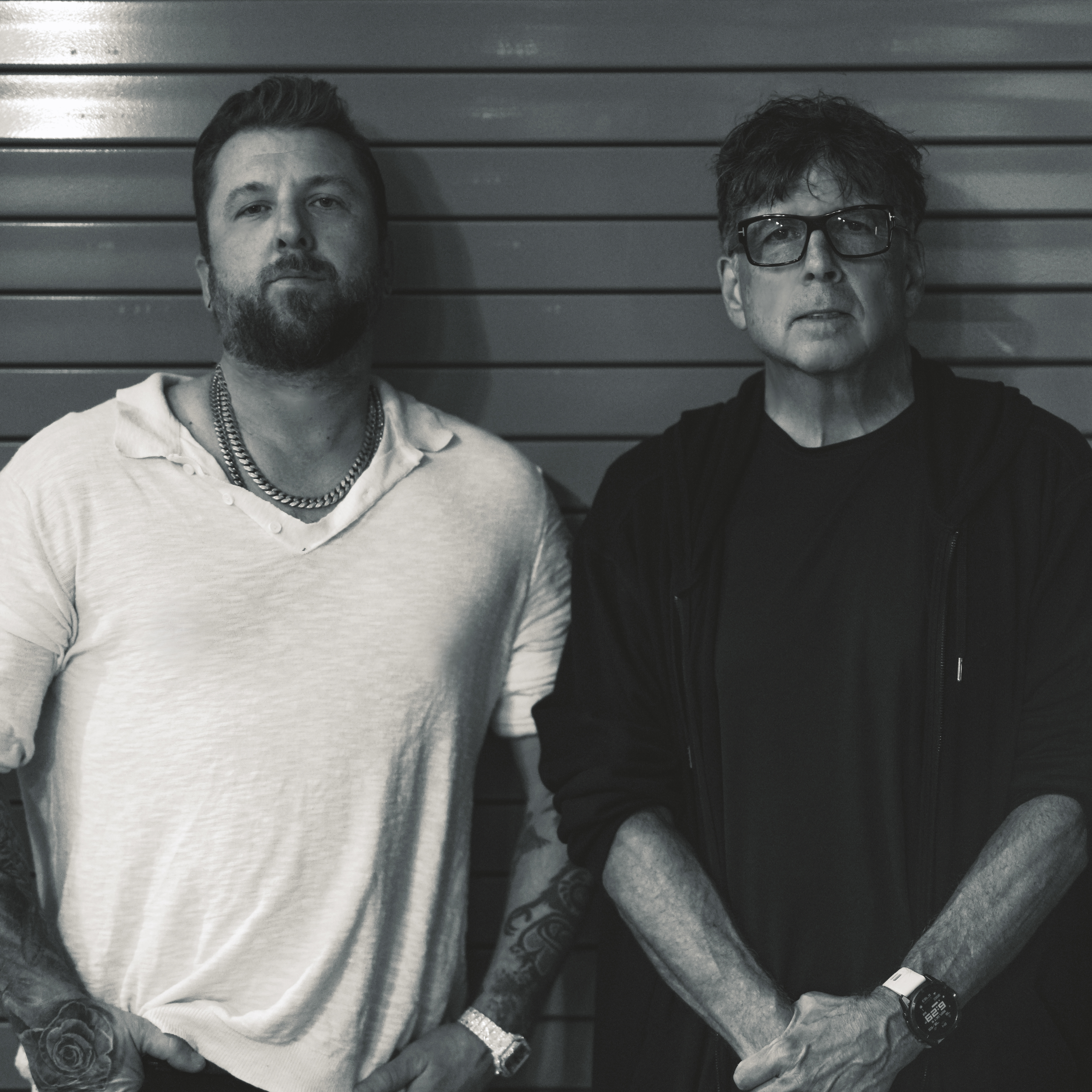
- Judge & Jury Records founders Neil Sanderson and Howard Benson.
- Founded: 2021
- Founder: Howard Benson and Neil Sanderson
- Genre: Alternative rock, rock, metal
- Country of origin: United States
- Location: Los Angeles, California
- Official website: judgeandjuryrecords.com

Judge & Jury Records is an American record label and production company founded in 2021 by Grammy-nominated producer Howard Benson (P.O.D., My Chemical Romance, Daughtry), and Canadian musician Neil Sanderson, drummer and co-founder of Multi-platinum Hard Rock band Three Days Grace, who have sold more than 13 million albums in the US. Based in Los Angeles, the company focuses primarily on rock and metal artists, and includes engineer Mike Plotnikoff (Papa Roach, Kiss, Van Halen) and producer/mixer Joe Rickard (Starset, In Flames, Limp Bizkit) among its core collaborators.

== History ==
The partnership between Benson and Sanderson dates back to 2006, when Benson produced Three Days Grace's triple-platinum sophomore album One-X., which would go on to become their most commercially successful album to date, featuring the hit singles "Animal I Have Become", "Pain", "Riot", and "Never Too Late". Benson later produced the band's follow-ups Life Starts Now, Outsider, Explosions, and Alienation.

In an interview with Grammy.com, Benson stated that the idea for launching the label stemmed from his desire for greater creative and commercial control over projects he produced, citing frustration with traditional royalty structures and project outcomes.

Benson and Sanderson first signed singer Diamante to a production deal and self-financed her record after she was dropped by her previous label; that collaboration's success ultimately led to the formation of Judge & Jury Records in 2021.

The company achieved early recognition with the release of Waiting on the Sky to Change, a collaboration between Starset and Breaking Benjamin, which reached No. 1 on the Mediabase Active Rock chart in 2022. Since then, the label's roster has expanded to include artists such as Saliva, Butcher Babies, and Alien Ant Farm, among others.

== Operations ==
Judge & Jury was launched by Howard Benson and Neil Sanderson to bridge the gap between traditional record production and the evolving needs of modern artists, operating as both a record label and production entity, emphasizing artist partnerships that integrate creative direction, marketing, and distribution strategies.

Over time, Judge & Jury Records expanded into full-scale releases, worldwide distribution collaborations, and cross-platform media campaigns, while Benson and Sanderson built an in-house production and songwriting team, working with a range of prominent rock and metal acts. The label operates on a self-financed model that allows for a 50/50 royalty split with artists — a major departure from the lower royalty percentages typical of traditional producer agreements.

The label has also earned recognition for its cross-generational approach, working with legacy acts while supporting new and emerging artists.

Judge & Jury's success model has been highlighted by outlets such as Forbes and Billboard for adapting the traditional label system into a producer-driven framework that allows both creative and financial independence for artists and producers alike.

== Artists ==
Judge & Jury's roster includes a variety of active rock, alternative, and metal artists. The label is known for balancing veteran acts with rising talent.

- 12 Stones
- Alien Ant Farm
- Bobby Amaru
- Butcher Babies
- Caleb Hyles
- Dead Rabbitts
- Dream Beard
- Earshot
- Emily Wolfe
- GORODA
- Hoobastank
- Jonathan Young
- Judge & Jury
- LYLVC
- Lyric Noel
- Saliva
- Silos
- Stitched Up Heart
- Veda

== Discography and releases ==
=== Discography ===
Year	Artist	Title	Featured Artists
2021	Jonathan Young	"Land of the Living" (Single)	—
2021	Jonathan Young	"Divided" (Single)	—
2021	Jonathan Young	"Damage Done" (Single)	RichaadEB
2021	Jonathan Young	"Rebel Yell" (Single)	Lukas Rossi
2021	Mitch Jones	Broken (EP) ("Emily" and "West Coast Tragedy" Only)	Kala; Ouse; Maya
2021	Edge of Paradise	"Love Reign Over Me" (Single)	
2022	Mitch Jones	"West Coast Tragedy (Judge & Jury Mix)" (Single)	Kala
2022	Mitch Jones	"Darkness" (Single)	Escape the Fate
2022	Starset	"Waiting on the Sky to Change" (Single)	Breaking Benjamin
2023	Kala	Diary of a Depressed Creative	Kellin Quinn; Luke Holland; Billy Martin
2023	Left To Suffer	Noah (EP)	
2023	Heirloom	Romanticize	Lauren Babic; Taylor Barber (Left to Suffer)
2023	Judge & Jury	"The Urge" (Single)	Tyler Connolly (Theory of A Deadman)
2023	Judge & Jury	"Disarm" (Single)	Caleb Hyles; Edge Of Paradise
2023	Judge & Jury	"Eventually" (Single)	Neil Sanderson (Three Days Grace)
2024	Silos	Insatiable (Remixes, Vol. 1) (Remix EP)	Orgy; BLVCK CROWZ;
2024	Silos	Insatiable (Remixes, Vol. 2) (Remix EP)	Pixel Terror, The Haunt, CrazyTown; Traveler
2024	Jonathan Young	Children of the Night	Matthew K. Heafy; Barry Stock (Three Days Grace); Caleb Hyles; Colm McGuinness, Lauren Babic; Jonathan Young
2024	Veda	"Wannabe Me" (Single)	—
2024	Butcher Babies	"Sincerity" (Single)	—
2024	Veda	"I Breakdown" (Single)	—
2024	Judge & Jury	"Euphoria" (Single)	Trevor McNevan (Thousand Foot Krutch)
2024	Caleb Hyles	The Darkness Before the Dawn	Lacey Sturm ; Manafest; Ashes Remain; Adelitas Way; Trevor McNevan (Thousand Foot Krutch); Jonathan Young
2024	Silos	Apocalips	Crazy Town; Orgy; The Haunt; Escape the Fate; From Ashes to New; Boonn
2025	Saliva	Revelation: Retold	Candlebox; Lauren Babic; Peyton Parrish
2025	Dead Rabbitts	Redefined	Wednesday 13; HIGHSOCIETY; Lauren Babic; Stitched Up Heart
2025	Saliva	"They Don’t Really Care About Us" (Single)	—
2025	Bobby Amaru & Veda	"Somebody That I Used To Know" (Single)	
2025	Bobby Amaru & Veda	"Just Pretend" (Single)	—
2025	LYLVC	"Barely Human" (Single)	—
2025	Bobby Amaru & Veda	"Somewhere I Belong" (Single)	—
2025	Silos	Apocalypse 2.0 (Remix EP)	HIGHSOCIETY; From Ashes to New; The Haunt; Escape the Fate
2025	Bobby Amaru & Veda	"Somebody’s Watching Me" (Single)	—
2025	Saliva	"Hit ’Em Where It Hurts" (Single)	—
2025	Saliva	"Too Broke to Fix" (Single)	The Founder
2025	Butcher Babies	Insincerity (EP)	Saliva; Lyric Noel; Harper; Sleeping In Silence; Alyxx; Shawn O'Donnell; Original Self; Gina Fritz; Kinda Happy; Chad Kowal; neversleep; Erik "Shredz" Jensen; Cage Fight; Ben Jewell
2025	Dream Beard	"SPRAY" (Single)	Sada Baby
2025	Fallen Within	"Worlds Apart" (Single)	Saliva
2025	Stitched Up Heart	"SICK SICK SICK" (Single)	Lauren Babic; Eyes Set To Kill
2025	Bobby Amaru & Veda	"Last Resort" (Single)	—
2025	Thrower	"Happy When We're Bleeding" (Single)	Craig Mabbitt (Escape The Fate)
2025	Alien Ant Farm	"Bad Attitude" (Single)	—
2026	Dream Beard	"VOID" (Single)	Sada Baby
2026	Stitched Up Heart	"GLITCH BITCH" (Single)	Conquer Divide
2026	Alien Ant Farm	"Actitud" (Single)	—
2026	12 Stones	"Golden Child" (Single)	—
2026	Bobby Amaru & Veda	"Running Up That Hill" (Single)	—
2026	Lyric Noel	"Shades of Black" (Single)	—
2026	Butcher Babies	"Lost In Your Touch" (Single)	—
2026	Alien Ant Farm	"Reasons" (Single)	—
2026	LYLVC	"Starless" (Single)	Bobby Amaru, Saliva
2026	Stitched Up Heart	"CANNIBAL" (Single)	Butcher Babies
2026	12 Stones	"World So Cold" (Single)	Lyric Noel
2026	Butcher Babies	"Black Dove" (Single)	—
2026	Dream Beard	"HIGH LIFE" (Single)	Dropout Kings
2026	Saliva	"Cope" (Single)	Trevor McNevan of Thousand Foot Krutch
2026	Emily Wolfe	"Crave Me" (Single)	—
2026	Emily Wolfe	"Lips" (Single)	Eagles of Death Metal
2026	Stitched Up Heart	"BEAST" (Single)	Nonpoint
2026	Stitched Up Heart	"MEET ME AFTER LIFE" (Single)	NOAPOLOGY
2026	Butcher Babies	"Blame It On The Wind" (Single)	—
2026	Saliva	"Sadistic Love" (Single)	—
2026	Caleb Hyles	"Not Your Savior (Acoustic)" (Single)	—
2026	Stitched Up Heart	"MEDUSA" (Album)	Austin John Winkler (the Founder), Lauren Babic, Eyes Set To Kill, Conquer Divide, Butcher Babies, NOAPOLOGY, Lyric Noel, Nonpoint, Geena Fontanella
2026	Hoobastank	"How Do You Sleep?" (Single)	—
2026	Saliva	"Edge of a Knife" (Single)	—
2026	GORODA	"Do Something Wrong" (Single)	Bobby Amaru of Saliva
2026	Saliva	"Longshot" (Single)	Johnny Van Zant of Lynyrd Skynyrd
2026	Lyric Noel	"Acid Bloom" (Single)	Mixi Demner of Stitched Up Heart
2026	Emily Wolfe	"Power" (Single)	—
2026	Saliva	"Breaking Through" (Album)	Trevor McNevan (Thousand Foot Krutch), Austin John Winkler (the Founder), Johnny Van Zant (Lynyrd Skynyrd)
2026	Earshot	"Love Left" (Single)	—
2026	Butcher Babies	"Leaving California" (Single)	—
2026	Alien Ant Farm	"Gaslighter" (Single)	—
2026	Butcher Babies	"NIGHTBLOOM" (Album)	—
2026	Dream Beard	"HOLLYWOOD TONIC" (Single)	Nick Nasty, Taylor Barber
2026	GORODA	"Break Free" (Single)	Ronnie Winter (The Red Jumpsuit Apparatus), Bobby Amaru (Saliva)
2026	Emily Wolfe	"Kill Me With A Kiss" (Single)	—
2026	Bobby Amaru	"Given Up" (Single)	
2026	Morning In May	"Homicide Stage" (Single)	Ronnie Winter (The Red Jumpsuit Apparatus)
2026	Lyric Noel	"It Comes In III's" (Single)	Rachel Aspe (Cage Fight)
