= End of Me =

End of Me may refer to:

- "End of Me" (Marion Raven song), 2005
- "End of Me" (Apocalyptica song), 2010
- "End of Me" (A Day to Remember song), 2013
- "End of Me", a song by Ashes Remain from the album What I've Become
- "End of Me", a song by Billy Talent from the album Crisis of Faith
- "End of Me", a song by Mother Mother from the album Grief Chapter
