= Never Alone (Stitched Up Heart album) =

Studio album by Stitched Up Heart
- Released: June 17, 2016
- Recorded: 2015
- Studios: Sun God Rock Studios, Wood Land Hill, Cuddledeath Studios
- Genres: Gothic metal; heavy metal; hard rock; alternative metal
- Length: 40:42
- Label: Another Century
- Producers: Mitchell Marlow, Sahaj Ticotin, Marc Jordan

Stitched Up Heart chronology
Skeleton Key (2014)	Never Alone (2016)	Darkness (2020)

Singles from Never Alone
- 1. "Finally Free" Released: December 17, 2015; 2. "Monster" Released: April 29, 2016; 3. "Catch Me When I Fall" Released: November 17, 2016

Never Alone is the debut studio album by the American rock band Stitched Up Heart released on June 17, 2016, by Another Century Records. It debuted in the Top 10 of both the Billboard Heatseeker and Hard Rock charts.

== Critical reception ==
In her review for Metal Hammer, Sophie Maughan rated the album with three stars from five, noting that: "... The five-piece encompass that heavy-yet-emotive ethos on their debut full-length, serving up a sound charged with earnest euphoria and vitriolic nuance." and concluding that "... This band wears their influences on their sleeves, but there are moments where artistic reverence could easily be interpreted as imitation. Stitched Up Heart now need to concentrate on establishing their own signature sound in order to avoid flatlining."

Matthew Cox, in his review for Shockwave Magazine, considered that: "...In an era of trite pop imitators and synthesized sounds, this album metaphorically sends listeners to a time when lyrics and the presence of a group of musicians defined their genre. Never Alone personifies the new hard rock genre to near perfection."

== Track listing ==
All tracks are written by Stitched Up Heart.

No.	Title	Length
1.	"Finally Free"	3:21
2.	"Monster"	3:16
3.	"Catch Me When I Fall"	4:29
4.	"Event Horizon"	3:51
5.	"It's So Easy"	3:15
6.	"Never Alone"	3:36
7.	"Now That You're Gone"	4:18
8.	"Turn You On"	4:20
9.	"Bleeding Out"	4:30
10.	"City of Angels"	3:32
11.	"I Can't Breathe"	4:12
Total length:		40:42

== Personnel ==
- Alecia "Mixi" Demner - lead vocals
- Merritt Goodwin - lead guitar
- Dorian Dolore - rhythm guitar
- Randy Mathias - bass, backing vocals
- James Decker - drums, backing vocals

=== Additional personnel ===
- Sahaj Ticotin - producer, engineering, additional backing vocals on tracks 3 and 8
- Brooke Villanyi - additional backing vocals on tracks 3 and 8, vocal editing on tracks 3, 4, 7, and 9
- Bekki Friesen - additional backing vocals on track 2, vocal editing on tracks 1, 2, 5, 6, and 10
- Marc Jordan - synth programming, additional guitar, vocal editing, co-producer, on track 2
- Mike Gossling - additional programming on tracks 2 and 10
- Fumitake Igarashi - additional programming on track 2
- Mitchell Marlow - producer, engineering, mixing, additional guitar on track 2
