= No More Sadface =

EP by Single File
- Released: July 10, 2007
- Genre: Indie rock, alternative rock, pop-punk
- Length: 12:08
- Label: Reprise, WEA

Single File chronology
My Best Defense (2005)	No More Sadface (2007)	Common Struggles (2009)

Professional ratings
Review scores
Source	Rating
AbsolutePunk.net	73% link

No More Sadface is the fourth EP released by the Denver, Colorado based trio Single File. It features the radio hit "Zombies Ate My Neighbors" and was their first release on Reprise Records.

== Track listing ==
1. "Zombies Ate My Neighbors" – 3:04
2. "Velcro" – 3:09
3. "Melody of You" – 2:40
4. "September Skyline" – 3:15

== Personnel ==
- Sloan Anderson—Vocals, Guitar, Bass guitar
- Joe Ginsberg—Bass, Guitar, Backing Vocals, Piano
- Chris Depew -- drums, Backing Vocals, Piano
