= Red Devotion =

EP by Ashes Remain
- Released: January 1, 2009
- Genre: Christian rock
- Length: 18:20
- Label: Independent

Ashes Remain chronology
Last Day Breathing (2007)	Red Devotion (2009)	What I've Become (2011)

Professional ratings
Review scores
Source	Rating
Jesus Freak Hideout	3.5/5 stars

Red Devotion is the first EP released by the Christian Rock band, Ashes Remain. It was released on January 1, 2009. This is also the band's third independent release.

== Critical reception ==
Rating the EP with 3.5 stars, Stanley Wells states that "while the first two songs on this EP are not as impressive as they could've been, the rest are rather impressive and give a preview to what Ashes Remain would sound like in 2011".

== Track listing ==
No.	Title	Length
1.	"All Your Faces"	4:43
2.	"Save Me"	2:39
3.	"Broken One"	4:34
4.	"In Too Deep"	3:06
5.	"Hold On, Move On"	3:18
Total length:		18:20

== Personnel ==
- Josh Smith – lead vocals, backing vocals
- Rob Tahan – lead guitar, backing vocals
- Ryan Nalepa – rhythm guitar
- Jon Hively – bass guitar, backing vocals
- Ben Kirk – drums, percussion
