= Battles (album) =

Studio album by In Flames
- Released: 11 November 2016
- Recorded: February–April 2016
- Studio: West Valley Studios, Woodland Hills, California, U.S.
- Genre: Alternative metal
- Length: 47:38
- Label: Eleven Seven, Nuclear Blast
- Producer: Howard Benson

In Flames chronology
Siren Charms (2014)	Battles (2016)	I, the Mask (2019)

Singles from Battles
- 1. "The Truth" Released: 26 August 2016; 2. "The End" Released: 26 August 2016; 3. "Through My Eyes" Released: 14 October 2016; 4. "Save Me" Released: 4 November 2016; 5. "Here Until Forever" Released: 12 May 2017

Professional ratings
Review scores
Source	Rating
Loudwire	Positive
Metal Hammer	3.5/5 stars
Sputnikmusic	1.5/5 stars

Battles is the twelfth studio album by Swedish heavy metal band In Flames. It was released on 11 November 2016 in the United States via Eleven Seven Music. It is the last album to feature longtime bassist Peter Iwers and the first of two albums to feature former Red drummer Joe Rickard, who replaced longtime drummer Daniel Svensson, who left the band in 2015. Music videos were made for the tracks "Here Until Forever" and "The End".

== Track listing ==
All tracks are written by Anders Fridén, Björn Gelotte and Howard Benson, with additional co-writers listed.

No.	Title	Writer(s)	Length
1.	"Drained"	Niclas Engelin; James Michael	4:06
2.	"The End"	Engelin	3:58
3.	"Like Sand"	Engelin; Sean Bowe; Lenny Skolnik; Bob Marlette	3:43
4.	"The Truth"	Bowe; Skolnik	3:04
5.	"In My Room"		3:25
6.	"Before I Fall"	Zac Maloy	3:27
7.	"Through My Eyes"	Bowe; Skolnik	3:50
8.	"Battles"		2:58
9.	"Here Until Forever"	Engelin	4:19
10.	"Underneath My Skin"	Bowe; Skolnik	3:30
11.	"Wallflower"	Engelin	7:06
12.	"Save Me"		4:12
Total length:			47:38

Bonus tracks
No.	Title	Writer(s)	Length
13.	"Greatest Greed"	Engelin	4:09
14.	"Us Against the World"		3:40
Total length:			55:27

Japanese edition bonus track
No.	Title	Writer(s)	Length
15.	"Here Until Forever" (alternate version)	Engelin	3:58
Total length:			59:25

== Personnel ==
In Flames

- Anders Fridén – vocals
- Björn Gelotte – guitars
- Niclas Engelin – guitars
- Peter Iwers – bass

Additional musicians

- Joe Rickard – drums, drum programming
- Örjan Örnkloo – keyboards, programming
- Marc Vangool – pedal steel guitar

Other personnel

- Howard Benson – production
- Mike Plotnikoff – engineer, mixing
- Hatsukazu "Hatch" Inagaki – engineering
- Carl Stoodt – engineering assistance
- Shaun Ezrol – engineering assistance
- Tom Coyne – mastering
- Randy Merrill – mastering assistance
- Paul Decarli – editing
- Marc Vangool – guitar technician
- Blake Armstrong – artwork, design
- Andy C. Fellows – design

== Charts ==
Chart (2016)	Peak position
Australian Albums (ARIA)	38
Austrian Albums (Ö3 Austria)	8
Belgian Albums (Ultratop Flanders)	45
Belgian Albums (Ultratop Wallonia)	58
Canadian Albums (Billboard)	19
Finnish Albums (Suomen virallinen lista)	3
French Albums (SNEP)	101
German Albums (Offizielle Top 100)	7
Norwegian Albums (VG-lista)	13
Scottish Albums (OCC)	59
Spanish Albums (PROMUSICAE)	83
Swedish Albums (Sverigetopplistan)	2
Swiss Albums (Schweizer Hitparade)	13
UK Albums (OCC)	75
UK Album Downloads (OCC)	63
UK Independent Albums (OCC)	11
UK Rock & Metal Albums (OCC)	3
US Billboard 200	60
