= Single File (band) =

American punk band

- Origin: Westminster, Colorado, United States
- Genres: Emo pop, pop punk, indie rock, power pop, alternative rock
- Years active: 2003 – 2010
- Label: Reprise Records
- Members: Sloan Anderson; Joe Ginsberg; Chris Depew
- Past members: Ray Salazar (Drums), John Chyben (Bass)

Single File was a band from Westminster, Colorado / Cleveland, Ohio. After achieving local success, the band was signed to Reprise Records in 2006.

== History ==
The group started out originally as a swing jazz quintet called Jackpot Charlie when its members were in high school, with additional members Roy Coon (saxophone) and Tommy Acierno (trumpet), though members Sloan Anderson and Chris Depew had been playing together since middle school. Their first EP, As You Were was self-released in 2005, followed by two further EPs, Heartbreak & Masturbation with Ray Salazar on drums (2006) and My Best Defense (2007). The band established itself in the local Los Angeles music scene and began to draw attention from local A&R reps. Ray Salazar left the band after Heartbreak & Masturbation to pursue other musical endeavors. After that they promoted several national tours in 2005 and 2006, including touring with the Vans Warped Tour as well as scoring regular airplay on Denver radio station KTCL with the song "Zombies Ate My Neighbors" (named after the video game of the same name), which became a local hit. Single File were also named one of MySpace's Top 10 Unsigned Bands in 2006.

In early 2006 Single File recorded their debut full-length, which was tentatively titled Benson Shady Grove, with producer Ed Rose (who has worked with such bands as Motion City Soundtrack, The Get Up Kids, Senses Fail, Emery, Reggie and the Full Effect, The Spill Canvas, and The New Amsterdams). However, instead of releasing the full-length, the band put the project on hiatus and continued touring. In July 2008, they released an iTunes-exclusive EP, No More Sadface, on Reprise Records instead, which hit No. 43 on the Billboard Heatseekers chart. Upon releasing the EP, the group opened for The Fray on several tour dates in America. Following this, the group opened for Saves the Day on their US tour.

Their debut full-length was retitled Common Struggles (former titles include Young Goodman Brown: A Book of Short Stories and Benson Shady Grove), was produced by Howard Benson, and was slated for release on Reprise in 2008. The album's release date was later changed to April 7, 2009.

The band has since toured with artists like Alkaline Trio, Plain White Tees, and even made it to the United Kingdom for Reading Festival in 2009.

== Members ==
- Sloan Anderson – vocals, guitar, bass guitar
- Joe Ginsberg – bass, guitar, backing vocals, piano
- Chris Depew – drums, backing vocals, piano
- Ray Salazar – drums (Heartbreak & Masturbation EP)
- John Chyben - bass (Song writing and studio work)

== Discography ==
=== Studio albums ===
- Common Struggles (Reprise Records, 2009)

=== EPs ===
- As You Were (Self-released, 2003)
- Heartbreak & Masturbation (Self-released, 2005)
- My Best Defense (Self-released, 2006)
- No More Sadface (Reprise Records, 2008)
