= Foregone =

Studio album by In Flames
- Released: 10 February 2023
- Recorded: 13 June 2022
- Studios: West Valley Recording, Woodland Hills, California
- Genres: Melodic death metal; alternative metal
- Length: 46:46
- Label: Nuclear Blast
- Producer: Howard Benson

In Flames chronology
I, the Mask (2019)	Foregone (2023)

Singles from Foregone
- 1. "State of Slow Decay" Released: 13 June 2022; 2. "The Great Deceiver" Released: 1 August 2022; 3. "Foregone, Pt. 1" Released: 15 September 2022; 4. "Foregone, Pt. 2" Released: 7 November 2022; 5. "Meet Your Maker" Released: 16 January 2023

Foregone is the fourteenth studio album by Swedish heavy metal band In Flames. The album was released on 10 February 2023 through Nuclear Blast and was produced by Howard Benson. It is the first album by the band to feature guitarist Chris Broderick, who replaced Niclas Engelin, and the only to entirely feature drums performed by Tanner Wayne. It is also the last album to feature the band's bassist Bryce Paul before he left the band in June 2023.

== Background and promotion ==
On 13 June 2022, In Flames announced they were re-signing with Nuclear Blast and released the single "State of Slow Decay"; the song was noted for having a sound similar to the band's earlier melodic death metal tracks. On 1 August, the band released the single "The Great Deceiver". On 15 September, In Flames announced their fourteenth album, Foregone, would be released on 10 February 2023. The same day as the album's announcement, the band released a visualizer for a third single, "Foregone, Pt. 1". "Foregone, Pt. 2" was released as the album's fourth single on 7 November along with a music video. On 16 January 2023, one month before the album release, they unveiled the fifth single "Meet Your Maker" and its corresponding music video.

== Critical reception ==
Professional ratings
Review scores
Source	Rating
AllMusic	3.5/5 stars
Blabbermouth.net	8.5/10
Distorted Sound	9/10
Kerrang!	4/5 stars
Metal Injection	9/10
MetalSucks	4.5/5 stars
Rock Hard	8.5/10
Rock 'N' Load	8/10
Rock Sins	7/10
Wall of Sound	9/10

The album has received critical acclaim from numerous publications. AllMusic gave the album a positive review saying, "Foregone [...] has a raw, bass-heavy, crunchy sound, with their usual highly melodic lines and harmonic solos present and correct, and a philosophical tone engendered by the imposed isolation of the COVID-19 lockdown." Dom Lawson from Blabbermouth.net gave the album 8.5 out of 10 and said: "Foregone is the finest album to bear the band's name since at least Come Clarity. Don't be surprised if they make an ambient jazz record next, but right now this sounds like the best of all possible worlds and a late-career triumph." Graham Ray of Distorted Sound scored the album 9 out of 10 and said: "In Flames have finally created an album that mixes their old and new styles together organically. Nothing sounds forced and everything works to almost perfection. Foregone is the best album the band have produced in the last 15-20 years and it's a pleasure to see them back with a fire well and truly lit beneath them." Kerrang! gave the album 4 out of 5 and stated: "Foregone is a reminder that when In Flames are at the peak of their powers, they really are untouchable. This is a record that will see them finally reassert their dominance, and ring in their next colossal era." Metal Injection rated the album 9 out of 10 and stated, "Foregone is a gift to fans who have stuck it out with In Flames all these years, as well as the new fans they've picked up along the way who might be ready for something heavier. It covers every genre and style the band has ever messed around with, bringing them into one cohesive whole. Don't skip any songs on Foregone. There aren't any bad tracks. The album's second half is marginally better than its first, but both are so good it feels unfair to compare them. It will all depend on which era of the band the listener prefers."

MetalSucks rated the album 4.5 out of 5 and said: "While the last few years have been turbulent for those waiting for In Flames to reclaim their mojo, they needn't worry any further. Foregone is a stick of dynamite with a first-place ribbon attached; a sensational rejuvenation that even the staunchest doomsayers will have a hard time picking apart. Even with the faults present, it blends what made the band so good in their prime with the unique components of the current line-up to make an album that stands well within the territory of the best they've put out before it. Rejoice, people, for In Flames have returned – and how." The reviewer for Rock Hard wrote that "Melodic death metal tracks like 'State of Slow Decay', 'Meet Your Maker', 'Foregone, Pt. 1' or 'The Great Deceiver' emphatically point out with their qualities why In Flames are counted among the founders of the typical Gothenburg sound. Tempo, heaviness, riffing and melody are perfectly balanced here and invoke some cozy memories of the early 2000s, which is even enhanced by a few folky excursions." Rock 'N' Load praised the album saying, "Foregone is a high-class album that might not bring anything new to its discography, but what it does do is show others just how good an album can be from front to back. I'm not convinced that this album falls into the Death Metal arena, more of a Metal offering for the masses to enjoy." Tasha Brown of Rock Sins rated the album 7 out of 10 and said: "Foregone may well become one of those cult albums for some and remain a point of vexation for others. For the moment, however, we fall tentatively within the latter." Wall of Sound gave the album a positive review saying: "The balancing act In Flames have pulled off is pretty impressive, giving just enough of the 'old In Flames' while continuing their evolution beyond the confines of generic death metal. The fact is the band have consistently delivered albums, even with lineup changes, that are damn heavy and progress their connection with their audience."

== Track listing ==
All lyrics are written by Anders Fridén and Björn Gelotte; all music is composed by Anders Fridén, Björn Gelotte, and Howard Benson.

Foregone track listing
No.	Title	Length
1.	"The Beginning of All Things That Will End" (instrumental)	2:13
2.	"State of Slow Decay"	3:58
3.	"Meet Your Maker"	3:57
4.	"Bleeding Out"	4:01
5.	"Foregone, Pt. 1"	3:24
6.	"Foregone, Pt. 2"	4:30
7.	"Pure Light of Mind"	4:26
8.	"The Great Deceiver"	3:45
9.	"In the Dark"	4:17
10.	"A Dialogue in B Flat Minor"	4:28
11.	"Cynosure"	4:05
12.	"End the Transmission"	3:42
Total length:		46:46

Box set edition bonus track & bonus edition
No.	Title	Length
13.	"Become One"	3:28
Total length:		50:14

== Personnel ==
In Flames

- Anders Fridén – lead vocals
- Björn Gelotte – lead guitar
- Chris Broderick – rhythm & lead guitar
- Bryce Paul – bass, backing vocals
- Tanner Wayne – drums

Production

- Howard Benson – production
- Joe Rickard ‐ mixing
- Mike Plotnikoff – audio engineering
- Hatsukazu "Hatch" Inagaki – vocal recording engineering
- Brandt Sier – audio engineering
- Ted Jensen – mastering
- Paul DeCarli – digital editing

Additional personnel

- Örjan Örnkloo - keyboards, programming
- Howard Benson – keyboards
- Joe Rickard – keyboards, drum programming
- Niels Nielsen – keyboards

== Charts ==
Chart performance for Foregone
Chart (2023)	Peak position
Australian Albums (ARIA)	63
Austrian Albums (Ö3 Austria)	1
Belgian Albums (Ultratop Flanders)	20
Belgian Albums (Ultratop Wallonia)	29
Canadian Albums (Billboard)	90
Dutch Albums (Album Top 100)	60
Finnish Albums (Suomen virallinen lista)	4
French Albums (SNEP)	63
German Albums (Offizielle Top 100)	1
Hungarian Albums (MAHASZ)	32
Italian Albums (FIMI)	93
Japanese Albums (Oricon)	21
Japanese Hot Albums (Billboard Japan)	21
Norwegian Albums (VG-lista)	10
Scottish Albums (Official Charts)	15
Spanish Albums (Promusicae)	22
Swedish Albums (Sverigetopplistan)	1
Swiss Albums (Schweizer Hitparade)	1
UK Albums (Official Charts)	79
UK Independent Albums (Official Charts)	6
UK Rock & Metal Albums (Official Charts)	3
US Billboard 200	110
US Independent Albums (Billboard)	16
US Top Hard Rock Albums (Billboard)	7
US Top Rock Albums (Billboard)	16
