= I, the Mask =

Studio album by In Flames
- Released: 1 March 2019
- Recorded: 14 December 2018
- Studio: West Valley Recording (Woodland Hills, California)
- Genre: Alternative metal
- Length: 50:48
- Labels: Nuclear Blast; Eleven Seven
- Producer: Howard Benson

In Flames chronology
Battles (2016)	I, the Mask (2019)	Foregone (2023)

Singles from I, the Mask
- 1. "I Am Above" Released: 14 December 2018; 2. "(This Is Our) House" Released: 14 December 2018; 3. "I, the Mask" Released: 10 January 2019; 4. "Burn" Released: 8 February 2019; 5. "Follow Me" Released: 17 September 2019

I, the Mask is the thirteenth studio album by Swedish heavy metal band In Flames, released on 1 March 2019. It is the band's first release since Whoracle (1997) without longtime bassist Peter Iwers, and the last to feature Joe Rickard on drums. It is the debut album for bassist Bryce Paul and drummer Tanner Wayne. It is also the last album to feature guitarist Niclas Engelin.

A chiptune reimagined version of the album (programmed by Sam Brown) was released in March 2020 through Better Noise Music to celebrate the album's first anniversary.

Loudwire named it one of the 50 best metal albums of 2019.

== Track listing ==
All tracks are written by Anders Fridén, Björn Gelotte and Howard Benson, except "In This Life" (written by Fridén, Gelotte, Benson, Seann Bowe and Lenny Skolnik).

No.	Title	Length
1.	"Voices"	4:47
2.	"I, the Mask"	3:41
3.	"Call My Name"	3:33
4.	"I Am Above"	3:49
5.	"Follow Me"	4:55
6.	"(This Is Our) House"	4:18
7.	"We Will Remember"	4:04
8.	"In This Life"	3:52
9.	"Burn"	3:43
10.	"Deep Inside"	4:21
11.	"All the Pain"	4:29
12.	"Stay with Me"	5:16
Total length:		50:48

Digipak edition bonus track & Japan bonus track
No.	Title	Length
13.	"Not Alone"	4:04
Total length:		54:52

== Personnel ==
In Flames

- Anders Fridén – vocals
- Björn Gelotte – lead guitar
- Niclas Engelin – rhythm guitar
- Bryce Paul Newman – bass
- Tanner Wayne – drums (on "(This Is Our) House")

Additional musicians

- Joe Rickard – drums (all songs except "(This Is Our) House")
- Örjan Örnkloo – keyboards, programming
- Howard Benson – additional keyboards

Production

- Howard Benson − producer
- Mike Plotnikoff − recording
- Hatsukazu "Hatch" Inagaki − recording
- Trevor Dietrich − additional engineering
- Zach Darf − additional engineering
- Paul Decarli − digital editing
- Chris Lord-Alge − mixing
- Ted Jensen − mastering
- Blake Armstrong − artwork

== Charts ==
Chart (2019)	Peak position
Australian Albums (ARIA)	48
Austrian Albums (Ö3 Austria)	1
Belgian Albums (Ultratop Flanders)	17
Belgian Albums (Ultratop Wallonia)	34
Canadian Albums (Billboard)	35
Dutch Albums (Album Top 100)	84
Finnish Albums (Suomen virallinen lista)	4
French Albums (SNEP)	41
German Albums (Offizielle Top 100)	2
Hungarian Albums (MAHASZ)	21
Norwegian Albums (VG-lista)	9
Scottish Albums (Official Charts)	15
Spanish Albums (PROMUSICAE)	32
Swedish Albums (Sverigetopplistan)	1
UK Albums (Official Charts)	66
US Billboard 200	121
