= What I've Become =

Studio album by Ashes Remain
- Released: August 23, 2011
- Genres: Christian rock, post-grunge
- Length: 37:34
- Label: Fair Trade
- Producer: Rob Hawkins

Ashes Remain chronology
Red Devotion (2009)	What I've Become (2011)	Christmas EP (2012)

Singles from What I've Become
- 1. "Come Alive" Released: 2011; 2. "Everything Good" Released: 2011; 3. "End Of Me" Released: 2012; 4. "On My Own" Released: 2012; 5. "Keep Me Breathing" Released: 2012; 6. "Change My Life" Released: 2012; 7. "Unbroken" Released: 2012; 8. "Without You" Released: 2014

What I've Become is the third studio album by Christian rock band Ashes Remain. It was released on August 23, 2011 by the label Fair Trade Services. The album charted on Billboard's Christian and Heatseeker Albums charts at Nos. 25 and 18 respectively. This album was produced by Rob Hawkins.

== Critical reception ==
Professional ratings
Review scores
Source	Rating
Alpha Omega News (Elise F.)	A
Alternative Addiction (Mike)	4/5 stars
Christian Music Zine (Tyler Hess)	3.5/5 stars
Cross Rhythms (Lins Honeyman)	10/10 stars
Jesus Freak Hideout (Michael Weaver)	3/5 stars
New Release Tuesday (Mary Burklin)	4/5 stars
Today's Christian Entertainment (Lori Lebel)	4.2/5 stars

The album was met with generally positive reviews from critics.

Alpha Omega New's Elise F. said that "What I've Become, the debut album of rock band Ashes Remain, is part Kutless, part Red, a bit Decyfer Down, and overall one of the best rock albums to come out yet this year." In addition, Elise F. wrote that "while Ashes Remain is a band that could come across at times as generic both lyrically and musically, they have surprising talent and a solid sound. I, for one, will definitely be putting this album on repeat while I wait to see what they come up with next."

Alternative Addiction's Mike said that "Baltimore Christian modern rock outfit Ashes Remain has undoubtedly produced one of the modern rock highlights of 2011. Full of hooks and great songs, 'What I've Become' hits all the right buttons whilst harnessing it to a hard edge that fans of Skillet and Kutless will fully appreciate. Held together by Rob Hawkins (Disciple, Fireflight) uncluttered production this album has the appeal to crossover into the secular market and at the same time be relevant in both the rock and the pop markets." Additionally, Mike wrote "whilst winning no awards for originality whatsoever 'What We've Become' nevertheless deserves high praise for its great songs, high quality musicianship and overall consistency making this album one of the surprises of 2011."

Christian Music Zine's Tyler Hess said that "the genre itself tends to lead to cookie-cutter albums, but even though Ashes Remain follows a pattern set forth by many bands before them in their debut, What I’ve Become, they do it with a fairly polished sound and by consistently mixing things up with different approaches it makes for a solid release."

Cross Rhythms' Lins Honeyman said that "this is a stunning release from a band set on communicating God's love in a real, relevant and electrifying way."

Jesus Freak Hideout's Michael Weaver said that "if you are a fan of the everyday average modern rock played in constant rotation on radio stations these days, Ashes Remain are right up your alley. They bring just enough on the side of catchy hooks with What I've Become to be interesting. If you are looking for something new and exciting, you should probably stay far away. Given the state of affairs in the music industry today, I can see Ashes Remain having some success with their accessible sound. Though their debut isn't particularly impressive, they do show enough chops in the style they play to be a band to look at in the future. Hopefully these guys can add some originality and creativity into their fairly polished sound."

New Release Tuesday's Mary Burklin said that "although there's not a whole lot of new ground broken lyrically and instrumentally in this album, it's a formula that works. Ashes Remain certainly adds its own unique flavor to the formula, and What I've Become is a solid addition to any collection. One of the elements that sets them apart is their use of intricate, guitar-focused bridges in almost every track. Another element that gives them strength is their ability to meld acoustic and grittier elements flawlessly in the same song. Overall, it is a raw album that sheds some light amidst dark themes." Lastly, Burklin wrote that "the album walks through hard places while still fixed on hope through the grace of Christ."

== Track listing ==
What I've Become
No.	Title	Writer(s)	Length
1.	"Keep Me Breathing"	Benjamin Kirk, Joe Pangallo, Jonathan Hively, Joshua Smith, Robert Tahan, Ryan Nalepa	2:58
2.	"On My Own"	Kirk, Hively, Smith, Tahan, Nalepa, Seth Mosley	2:53
3.	"Everything Good"	Kirk, Hively, Smith, Paul Alan, Tahan, Nalepa	3:40
4.	"Without You"	Kirk, Hively, Smith, Alan, Tahan, Nalepa	3:49
5.	"Come Alive"	Kirk, Hively, Smith, Robert Graves, Tahan, Nalepa	3:41
6.	"Unbroken"	Kirk, Chuck Butler, Hively, Smith, Tahan, Nalepa	3:07
7.	"End of Me"	Kirk, Brian Hitt, Hively, Smith, Tahan, Nalepa	2:50
8.	"Right Here"	Kirk, Hitt, Hively, Smith, Tahan, Nalepa	2:51
9.	"Change My Life"	Kirk, James Rueger, Hively, Smith, Tahan, Nalepa	2:59
10.	"Take It Away"	Kirk, Hively, Smith, Tahan, Nalepa	2:40
11.	"Inside of Me"	Kirk, Hively, Smith, Tahan, Nalepa	2:50
12.	"I Won't Run Away"	Kirk, Butler, Hively, Smith, Tahan, Nalepa	3:20
Total length:			37:34

== Personnel ==
- Josh Smith – lead vocals, backing vocals
- Rob Tahan – lead guitar, backing vocals
- Ryan Nalepa – rhythm guitar
- Jon Hively – bass guitar, backing vocals
- Ben Kirk – drums, percussion

== Charts ==
Album

Chart (2011–12)	Peak position
US Top Christian Albums (Billboard)	25
US Heatseekers Albums (Billboard)	18
