= Meriwether (band) =

American alternative rock band

- Origin: Baton Rouge, Louisiana, U.S.
- Genres: Alternative rock
- Years active: 2003–present
- Labels: Suretone Records; GVE Records
- Members: Andrew Reilley
- Past members: Bob Reilley; Skip Angelle; Stefon Bergeron; Brett Schexnayder; Sam Anderson; Josh Barbier

Meriwether is an American alternative rock band from Baton Rouge, Louisiana, formed in 2003.

== History ==
Meriwether released their debut full-length LP, Make Your Move, in 2005 on start-up label GVE Records and sold over 10,000 copies and played over 300 shows in one year to promote the album by booking shows via MySpace. The band signed to Suretone Records in 2006 and the album Make Your Move was re-released in 2007, minus the songs "Aye Julian", "Girl In Mexico", & "And Tonic ER." Then Meriwether proceeded to record their second album, Sons of Our Fathers, with Grammy-nominated producer Howard Benson (My Chemical Romance, Three Days Grace) and mixed by Chris Lord-Alge (Underoath, AFI). After the album was finished, Meriwether continued to tour, while the release date was set back numerous times, until finally it was announced that Meriwether was no longer with Suretone. The album was never officially released until June 14, 2021. The band recorded and released a new album, Plug in the Snakes, at the end of 2009 independently at Little House Studios in Baton Rouge. Meriwether played their last show with band members guitarist, Stefon Bergeron and bassist, Josh Barbier, on July 16, 2010. Sam Anderson left to play drums for the band 10 Years. In 2012, Meriwether went back in with original producer of Make Your Move, Rhett Mouton, and recorded the EP, Save Our Souls. In December 2013, the ten-year anniversary of the band, Meriwether performed a show at the Varsity Theatre in their hometown of Baton Rouge with all original members.

Andrew Reilley, lead vocalist for the band, continued Meriwether as well as multiple projects, such as Discovery Corps, Grinders and IAMANDYFORD which released two songs titled "Call The Cops" and "Dr. Midnight", debuting the live act in Austin, Texas, at SXSW 2011. Meriwether performed two shows in their hometown of Baton Rouge in 2014, including their 6th annual Zombie Prom event.

== Members ==
Current

- Andrew Reilley – lead vocals, guitar (2003–present)

Former

- Joshua Barbier – bass (2003–2010)
- Brett Schexnayder – drums, percussion (2003–2008)
- Sam Anderson – drums, percussion (2008–2010)
- Stefon Bergeron – guitar (2003–2010, 2017–2018)
- Bob Reilley – drums (2012–2017)
- Skip Angelle – guitar, backing vocals (2008–2017)
- James Brent Armstrong (2012–2017)

== Discography ==
=== Studio albums ===
Year	Album
2005 (re-released in 2007)	Make Your Move
2009	Plug in the Snakes
2010	Make Your Move 5th Anniversary Edition (with bonus tracks)
2021	Sons of Our Fathers

=== EPs ===
Year	Album
2004	Meriwether
2012	Save Our Souls

=== Singles and music videos ===
- 2010: "If You Had Guts, I'd Hate 'Em"
