= Common Struggles =

Studio album by Single File
- Released: April 7, 2009
- Genre: Emo pop, powerpop, pop punk, alternative rock
- Label: Reprise
- Producer: Howard Benson

Single File chronology
| No More Sadface (2007) | Common Struggles (2009) |

Professional ratings
Review scores
| Source | Rating |
|---|---|
| allmusic | 3.5/5 stars |

Common Struggles is the debut and only album released by the Denver, Colorado-based rock band Single File. It was released on April 7, 2009 through Reprise Records. The first radio single from the album is "Girlfriends" released in March 2009.

== Track listing ==
1. "Mannequin Loveseat" – 3:17
2. "Don't Hate" – 3:13
3. "Girlfriends" – 3:02
4. "Airports" – 3:33
5. "Pizzagirl" – 2:56
6. "Miss Cherry Lipgloss" – 3:05
7. "Melody Of You" – 2:43
8. "Blue Sky Happiness" – 3:23
9. "Zombies Ate My Neighbors" – 3:01
10. "Dear Meghan" – 3:13
11. "Benson Shady Grove (Save Yourself)" – 3:04

== Personnel ==
- Sloan Anderson – lead vocals, guitar, bass
- Chris Depew – drums, backing vocals
- Joe Ginsberg – bass, guitar, keyboards
- Produced by Howard Benson
- Mixed by Tom Lord-Alge
