= Mitch Jones (streamer) =

American Twitch streamer (born 1992)

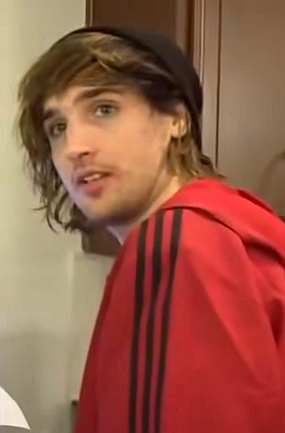
- Jones in 2020
- Born: David Mitchell Jones; July 23, 1992 (age 34); Maryland, U.S.
- Occupations: Twitch streamer; musician

Twitch information
- Channel: MitchJones
- Years active: 2011–present
- Genres: Gaming; reacting; IRL; music; gambling
- Game: World of Warcraft
- Followers: 739,000

X information
- Handle: @MitchJonez
- Last updated: July 30, 2026

David Mitchell Jones (born July 23, 1992) is an American Twitch streamer and musician.

== Career ==
Jones began streaming on Twitch (then known as Justin.tv) in 2011. He primarily played World of Warcraft PVP (player versus player) combat. He would later begin streaming IRL (in real life) content. In 2015, Jones's stream averaged 5,000 concurrent viewers.

Between 2017 and 2019, Jones was involved in some controversies involving the use of slurs and the use of his phone while driving. These incidents led to suspensions of his Twitch account and to a temporary revocation of his Twitch partnership status.

On April 19, 2021, Jones released "Now that you're gone," a song dedicated to Byron "Reckful" Bernstein, a fellow Twitch streamer and close friend of Jones who died by suicide in 2020. Two days later, Jones announced a break from streaming and his intention to pursue a career in music.

On July 23, 2021, Jones released his debut extended play, If I Could Go Back. In a press release, he stated, "I want to write songs to save people who are struggling, just like I've been." He returned to Twitch that same day, holding a party where he performed the EP's songs live.

== Personal life ==
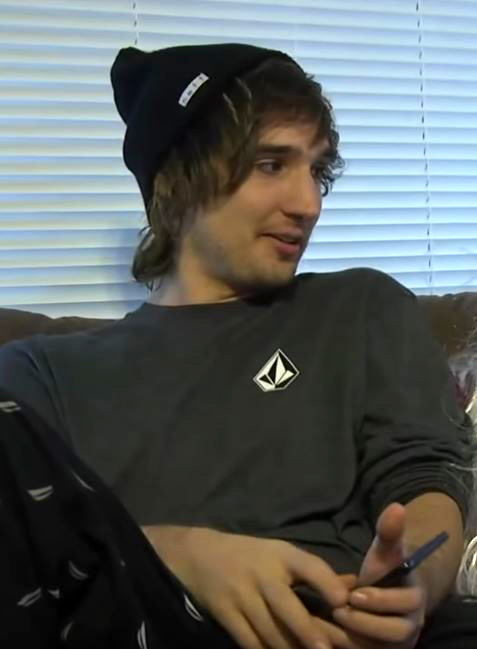
Jones in 2020

Jones resides in Los Angeles, California.

He has stated that he suffers from bouts of anxiety and depression.

== Discography ==
=== Extended plays ===
Title	Album details
If I Could Go Back	Released: 2021; Label: Self-released; Formats: Digital download, streaming
Broken	Released: 2021; Label: Self-released; Formats: Digital download, streaming

=== Singles ===
Single	Year	Album	Ref.
"Now That You're Gone"	2021	If I Could Go Back	
"Perfect Vibe"	2021	If I Could Go Back	
"West Coast Tragedy" (featuring Ouse)	2021	Broken	
"Darkness" (featuring Craig Mabbitt)	2022	Single	
