= Waiting on the Sky to Change =

Single by Starset featuring Breaking Benjamin
- Released: August 19, 2022
- Recorded: 2022
- Studio: West Valley Recording Studios (Woodland Hills, California)
- Genre: Hard rock
- Length: 4:04
- Label: Judge & Jury
- Songwriters: Dustin Bates; Jasen Rauch
- Producers: Joe Rickard; Dustin Bates; Howard Benson; Neil Sanderson

Starset singles chronology
"Infected" (2021)	"Waiting on the Sky to Change" (2022)	"Brave New World" (2024)

Breaking Benjamin singles chronology
"Dear Agony" (Aurora version) (2020)	"Waiting on the Sky to Change" (2022)	"Awaken" (2024)

Lyric video
- "Waiting on the Sky to Change" on YouTube

"Waiting on the Sky to Change" is a song by American rock band Starset. The song features contributions by American rock band Breaking Benjamin. Written by Dustin Bates (Starset) and Jasen Rauch (Breaking Benjamin) for Bates' prior band, Downplay in 2011, the song was re-recorded in 2022 and released as a single in August 2022. As of February 2023, the Starset and Breaking Benjamin version peaked at number one on the Mediabase Active Rock chart and number two on the Billboard Mainstream Rock Airplay chart.

== Background ==
Prior to fronting the band Starset, Dustin Bates fronted the band Downplay. The band released a series of albums across the 2000s and early 2010s, including the album Beyond the Machine in 2011. For the album, Bates and Jasen Rauch wrote a song called "Waiting on the Sky to Change". A few years later, Bates put the band on hold while he started up the band Starset. While Bates found success with Starset in the 2010s, Rauch joined American rock band Breaking Benjamin around the same time. With the two bands popular and having a similar rock sound, the two bands toured together, including a tour in early 2022. In July 2022, both bands began teasing a collaboration, eventually revealed to be a re-recorded version of the Downplay song "Waiting on the Sky to Change" featuring members of both Starset and Breaking Benjamin.

While the new version is often referred to as a cover version, Bates noted that he didn't feel like the label was particularly accurate, considering the Downplay original had been written and recorded himself. It was released on August 19, 2022. The track debuted on multiple Billboard charts upon its release.

== Themes and composition ==
Publications noted that the song was a melding of Starset and Breaking Benjamin's signature sounds while remaining faithful to the original Downplay version as well. The first verse is sung by Bates, while the second verse is sung by Benjamin Burnley.

== Personnel ==
Musicians

- Dustin Bates – vocals, keyboards
- Jasen Rauch – bass, guitar
- Luke Holland – drums
- Siobhán Richards – violin
- Zuzana Engererova – cello
- Benjamin Burnley – featured vocals

Production

- Howard Benson – production
- Neil Sanderson – production
- Joe Rickard – production, mixing and programming
- Dustin Bates – production
- Ted Jensen – mastering
- Paul DeCarli – digital editing
- Jay Wud – additional programming
- Chaz Sexton – programming
- Mike Plotnikoff – audio engineer
- Dave Schiffman – audio engineer
- Chaz Sexton – additional engineer
- Razor & Tie – music publisher
- Judge & Jury – phonographic copyright
- True Anomaly Music – music publisher

== Charts ==
Chart (2022)	Peak position
US Hot Hard Rock Songs (Billboard)	3
US Rock & Alternative Airplay (Billboard)	15
US Hot Rock & Alternative Songs (Billboard)	32
US Mainstream Rock (Billboard)	2
