= Ashes Remain =

American Christian rock band

- Official Logo

Background information
- Origin: Baltimore, Maryland, U.S.
- Genres: Christian rock, post-grunge
- Years active: 2001–present
- Labels: Fair Trade Services, BEC
- Members: Josh Smith; Ryan Nalepa; Ben Kirk; Rob Tahan; Nathan Heavel
- Past members: Ben Ogden; Jon Hively
- Website: www.ashesremain.com

Ashes Remain is an American Christian rock band, formed in 2001 and based in Baltimore, Maryland. The band was founded by Josh Smith and Ryan Nalepa. While they released two albums in their first six years, the band is popularly known for its third album, What I've Become, which was released in 2011. They have released four albums, Lose the Alibis (2003), Last Day Breathing (2007), What I've Become (2011), and Let the Light In (2017), two EPs, Red Devotion (2009) and Christmas EP (2012) and two non-album singles, "Separated" (2004) and "Here For a Reason" (2014). They released two singles in 2024, Don't Let Go, Lost Light.

== Background ==
Ashes Remain is from Baltimore, Maryland, where Josh Smith of Florida and Ryan Nalepa met at River Valley Ranch, a summer youth camp during worship services. They prayed about forming a band, which they did when the opportunity arose for Smith to become worship leader at a church. This church was just minutes from Nalepa's home, so this facilitated the band's creation. The other members of the band, which comprised Rob Tahan, Jonathan Hively and Ben Kirk, were not added until some years later. In the summer of 2003, Ashes Remain released their first independent record, Lose the Alibis. According to the band, the album moved around 2,000 copies in one year.

On August 2, 2003, the band announced on their official website that they competed and won the "Philadelphia Regional Christian Artist Talent Search 2003". Later on, they went to Charlotte, NC for the next round of competition on September 24, 2003.

On February 17, 2004, Ashes Remain stated on their website that they will be interviewed on February 29, on Baltimore's 98 Rock. On March 13, 2004, they stated on their website that their live DVD had gone into post production, and they had already started working on their second album.

On September 4, 2004, bass guitar player Ben Ogden left the group, and hand-picked Jon Hively as the band's new bassist before leaving. Lose the Alibis was followed by Last Day Breathing on March 13, 2007 and the Red Devotion EP on July 22, 2009. In early 2010, Ashes Remain signed with Fair Trade Services. Ashes Remain has been together for ten years as of 2011. Their album What I've Become was made "from the perspective of feeling like there's no hope but finding out that there really is." The band feels that the "journey from dark to light isn't overnight and sometimes has to be traveled many times, but it's a journey the band is familiar with and feels called to travel with its fans." They have widespread appeal and their songs are played on CCM and Christian Rock and Rap stations around the country. Ashes Remain toured with Fireflight on the Stay Close Tour in early 2012.

On November 14, the band announced their release of their Christmas EP on Facebook, which was released on November 20. They announced that the song off of the album "Gift Of Love" will be the band's new single and was available for free download on December 12.

"All of Me", was released on August 15, 2017.

Let the Light In was released through BEC Recordings on October 27, 2017.

== Discography ==
=== Studio albums ===
Year	Album/EP	Peak chart positions	
Year	Album/EP	Top Christian	Top Heatseekers
2003	Lose the Alibis: Released: June 2003; Label: Self-released; Format: CD	—	—
2007	Last Day Breathing: Released: March 13, 2007; Label: Self-released; Format: CD, Digital download	—	—
2011	What I've Become: Released: August 23, 2011; Label: Fair Trade Services; Format: CD, Digital download	25	18
2017	Let the Light In: Released: October 27, 2017; Label: BEC Recordings; Format: CD, Digital download	36	11

=== Extended plays ===
Year	Album/EP	Peak chart positions	
Year	Album/EP	Top Christian	Top Heatseekers
2009	Red Devotion (EP): Released: January 1, 2009; Label: Self-released; Format: CD, Digital download	—	—
2012	Christmas EP: Released: November 19, 2012; Label: Fair Trade Services/Columbia Records; Format: Digital download	—	—

=== 2000's - 2010's ===
List of singles and peak chart positions
Year	Title	Peak chart positions					Certifications	Album
Year	Title	US Christ.	US Christian AC	US Christian CHR	US Christian Rock	UK Christian Songs	Certifications	Album
2004	"Broken Pieces"	—	—	—	—	—		Lose the Alibis
2011	"Come Alive"	—	—	—	2	—		What I've Become
2011	"Everything Good"	17	16	21	—	—		What I've Become
2012	"End of Me"	—	—	14	—	2		What I've Become
2012	"On My Own"	33	—	7	6	—	RIAA: Gold	What I've Become
2012	"Keep Me Breathing"	—	16	—	—	1		What I've Become
2012	"Change My Life"	40	—	22	—	—		What I've Become
2012	"Unbroken"	—	—	—	8	—		What I've Become
2014	"Here for a Reason"	20	—	—	—	—		Non-album single
2014	"Without You"	34	—	—	—	—		What I've Become
2017	"All of Me"	46	—	—	—	—		Let the Light In
2017	"Rise"	—	—	—	—	—		Let the Light In
2017	"On Fire"	29	—	—	—	4		Let the Light In
2018	"All I Need"	50	—	—	37	10		Let the Light In
2018	"Captain"	—	—	—	18	—		Let the Light In

=== 2020's ===
Year	Title
2024	"Don't Let Go"
2024	"Lost Light"

=== Music videos ===
- "Save Me" (from Red Devotion)
- "End of Me" (from What I've Become)
- "Unbroken" (from What I've Become)
- "The Memory" (from The Darkness Before the Dawn)

== Members ==
=== Current members ===
- Josh Smith – lead vocals (2001–present)
- Ryan Nalepa – rhythm guitar (2001–present)
- Ben Kirk – drums, percussion (2001–present)
- Rob Tahan – lead guitar, backing vocals (2001–present)
- Nathan Heavel – bass guitar (2024–present)

=== Former members ===
- Ben Ogden – bass guitar (2001–2004)
- Jon Hively – bass guitar (2004–2024)
