= Stitched Up Heart =

American rock band

- Origin: Los Angeles, California, U.S.
- Genres: Alternative metal; gothic metal; hard rock
- Years active: 2010–present
- Labels: Another Century, Century Media
- Members: Alecia 'Mixi' Demner; Merritt Goodwin; Randy Mathias; Delaney Jaster
- Past members: James Decker; Derek Jochmann; Mikey Alfero; David DiSarro; Andrew Carroll; Dorian Dolore; Nikki Misery; Grant Webb; Nick Bedrosian
- Website: stitchedupheart.org

Stitched Up Heart is an American rock band on Another Century Records. The band was formed in 2010 in Los Angeles by singer Alecia "Mixi" Demner. They have released three studio albums and three EPs. They have performed as the opening act for Godsmack, Halestorm, Steel Panther and In This Moment.

== History ==
=== Early years, formation and early releases (2010–2015) ===
The group was founded in 2010 by vocalist Alecia 'Mixi' Demner, she would later recruit fellow guitarist Mikey Alfero and current New Years Day guitarist Nikki Misery with bassist David DiSarro and drummer Andrew Carroll the five-piece band would later release a self-titled EP on November 22, 2010, available by download only the EP featured "We're Alive" and "Is This the Way You Get to Hell?" they would release their second EP Escape the Nightmare in 2011.

After the release Alfero, Misery, and Carroll left the band in 2011 and the band was reformed by Mixi and current drummer James Decker, eventually recruiting Grant Webb, Nicky Warman and Dave DiSarro for a few shows. This lineup soon switched to just Mixi, Decker, Grant and Derek Jochmann on bass for a few U.S. tours.

In 2013, the band went through another lineup change after Jochmann left the band and was replaced by Jerry who was quickly replaced by Merritt Goodwin. Stitched Up Heart continued on as four-piece group following Grant's departure with Luke Man on guitar.

On May 20, 2014, Stitched Up Heart released a new EP titled Skeleton Key. In 2015 Dorian Dolore joined the band as the new second guitarist but would later be replaced by guitarist Nick Bedrosian in 2016.

=== Never Alone (2015–2017) ===
After several years spent developing their sound, recording demos and playing in local clubs, in 2015 Stitched Up Heart was signed to Another Century Records, a division of Century Label Group. A new single, "Finally Free," was released in late 2015 and eventually reached No. 19 in America's Active Rock Radio Chart. A follow-up single, "Monster," co-produced and co-written by Marc Jordan and Mitchell Marlow was unveiled April 29, 2016 and Billboard.com premiered the song "Event Horizon" on June 3, 2016. The band's major label debut, the album Never Alone was released on June 17, 2016, and debuted in the Top 10 of both the Billboard Heatseeker and Hard Rock charts.

In early 2017, the ensemble toured with American hard rock band Letters from the Fire. After two months off the road, Stitched Up Heart headlined a sell-out concert at The Knitting Factory in Boise, Idaho on Friday April 21, 2017, promoted by local radio station 100.3 The X.

=== Darkness (2018–2023) ===
In 2019 the band released the song "Lost" from their second studio album, Darkness. It features vocals by Sully Erna of Godsmack. It also contains the singles "Darkness" and "Problems".

=== To the Wolves and Medusa (2023–present) ===
On September 1, 2023, the band released their third studio album, To the Wolves. Its lead single is "Possess Me". It also contains the songs "To the Wolves" (featuring Craig Mabbit from Escape the Fate) and "Immortal". They began a new tour with Escape the Fate, Destroy Rebuild Until God Shows, Points North, and Garzi a month later. On November 21, 2025, Stitched Up Heart released the single, "Sick Sick Sick". On January 6, 2026, the band announced their fourth studio album, Medusa which is set to be released on June 12, 2026, and at the same time released the single, "Glitch Bitch". On March 17, 2026, they released the single, "Cannibal". On April 21, 2026, they released the single "Beast".

== Band members ==
=== Current ===
- Alecia 'Mixi' Demner – lead vocals, rhythm guitar (2010–present)
- Merritt Goodwin – lead guitar (2012–present)
- Randy Mathias – bass, backing vocals (2014–present)
- Delaney Jaster – drums (2025–present)

=== Former ===
- James Decker – drums, backing vocals (2011–2024)
- Mikey Alfero – lead guitar (2010–2011)
- David DiSarro – bass (2010–2012)
- Andrew Carroll – drums (2010–2011)
- Dorian Dolore – rhythm guitar (2015–2016)
- Nikki Misery – lead guitar (2010–2011)
- Nicky Warman – rhythm guitar (2012)
- Luke Man – lead guitar (2013)
- Grant Webb – lead guitar (2012–2013)
- Nick Bedrosian – rhythm guitar, backing vocals (2016–2019)

== Discography ==
=== Studio albums ===
- Never Alone (2016)
- Darkness (2020)
- To the Wolves (2023)
- Medusa (2026)

=== EPs ===
- Stitched Up Heart (2010)
- Escape the Nightmare (2011)
- Skeleton Key (2014)

=== Singles ===
Title	Year	US Main.	Album
"Finally Free"	2015	22	Never Alone
"Monster"	2016	27	Never Alone
"Catch Me When I Fall"	2016	27	Never Alone
"Lost" (featuring Sully Erna)	2019	×	Darkness
"Darkness"	2019	×	Darkness
"Problems"	2019	×	Darkness
"To the Wolves" (featuring Craig Mabbitt)	2023	×	To the Wolves
"Possess Me"	2023	×	To the Wolves
"Immortal"	2023	×	To the Wolves
"Uninvited" (with Pistols at Dawn)	2025	×	Memento Mori
"Sick Sick Sick" (with Eyes Set to Kill and Lauren Babic)	2025	×	Medusa
"Glitch Bitch" (with Conquer Divide)	2026	×	Medusa
"Cannibal" (with Butcher Babies)	2026	×	Medusa
"Beast" (with Nonpoint)	2026	×	Medusa
"Meet Me After Life" (with NOAPOLOGY)	2026	×	Medusa
"Medusa" (featuring Lyric Noel)	2026	×	Medusa

==== As featured artist ====
Title	Year	Album
"Hellscape" _{(The Dead Rabbitts featuring Stitched Up Heart and Wednesday 13)}	2025	Redefined
"Acid Bloom" _{(Lyric Noel featuring Stitched Up Heart)}	2026	N/A

=== Music videos ===
Title	Year	Album	Director(s)
"Is This the Way You Get to Hell?"	2011	Escape the Nightmare EP	Eric Mendoza
"Grave"	2012	Skeleton Key EP	Eric Mendoza
"Frankenstein"	2014	Skeleton Key EP	Sandy Stenzel & Robert G. Phelps
"Finally Free"	2015	Never Alone	Ron Thunderwood
"Monster"	2016	Never Alone	Robert Graves
"Catch Me When I Fall"	2016	Never Alone	Unknown
"Lost"	2019	Darkness	Paris Visone
"Warrior"	2020	Darkness	Ron Thunderwood & Alecia 'Mixi' Demner
"My Demon"	2020	Darkness	Alison Roberto
"To the Wolves"	2023	To the Wolves	Tony Aguilera
"Possess Me"	2023	To the Wolves	Tony Aguilera
"Immortal"	2023	To the Wolves	Tony Aguilera
"Conquer and Divide"	2023	To the Wolves	Tony Aguilera
"Sick Sick Sick"	2025	Medusa	Tony Aguilera
"Glitch Bitch"	2026	Medusa	Michael Levine
"Cannibal"	2026	Medusa	Tony Aguilera
"Medusa"	2026	Medusa	Michael Levine
"Love and Death"	2026	Medusa	Rawl Paredes
