= Red Handed Denial =

Canadian metalcore band

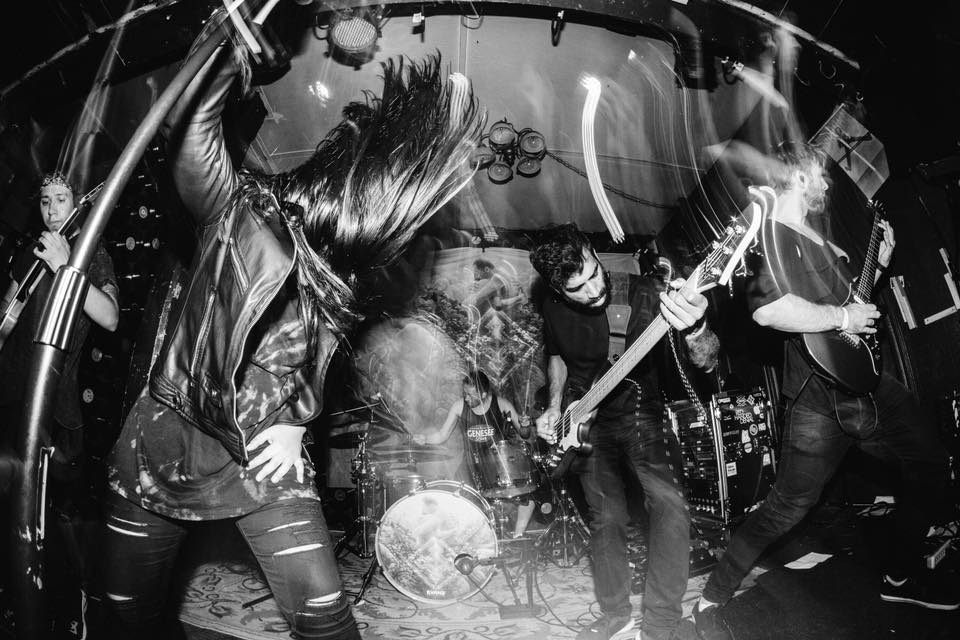
- Red Handed Denial live in Tonawanda, New York, 2019

Background information
- Origin: Toronto, Ontario, Canada
- Genres: Progressive metal; metalcore; djent; post-hardcore
- Years active: 2008–present
- Label: Independent
- Members: Lauren Babic; Tyson Dang; Chris Mifsud; Dominick De Kauwe
- Past members: Aleksei Perepelitsa; Dwayne Vansluytman; Neil Jones; Levar Allen; Steven Eliopoulos; Stephanie Da Silva
- Website: www.redhandeddenial.com

Red Handed Denial are a Canadian metalcore band from Toronto, Ontario. Though their formation was in 2008, the band did not start touring seriously until 2016. Red Handed Denial have toured the United States and Canada with bands such as Protest the Hero, I Set My Friends On Fire, AURAS, Sea of Treachery, and ACME, and have performed with bands such as Trivium, The Contortionist, Matenrou Opera, I See Stars, Silent Planet, and A Skylit Drive.

== History ==
The band formed in 2008 by guitarists Chris Mifsud and Levar Allen, drummer Steven Eliopoulos, and bassist Stephanie Da Silva. Lauren Babic, now also frontwoman of international collaboration trio CrazyEightyEight and acclaimed YouTuber, joined as front-woman in September 2008. They released their debut EP Eyes and Liquid Skies in 2009, which was produced by Juno-nominated producer Derek Hoffman.

In 2011, Da Silva departed the band and was replaced by Neil Jones. The following year in 2012, Allen and Eliopoulos departed the band. Aleksei Perepelitsa and Tyson Dang joined soon after. Red Handed Denial then released their first full-length album in December 2013 entitled Stories of Old. This album marked a shift in the band's sound away from their former technical elements. The band describes this album as more rock influenced.

Red Handed Denial parted ways with bassist Neil Jones in March 2015 and he was replaced briefly by Dwayne Vansluytman. They went on to open for Protest the Hero in April and play the Toronto date of Vans Warped Tour in July. The band would then return to their technical sound with the release of single and music video "Collector" in October 2015 which charted on the iTunes top 200 metal songs. Vansluytman parted ways with the band and was replaced by Dominick De Kauwe as the new bassist.

In January 2016, Red Handed Denial opened for the band Trivium at a sold-out show in Kitchener, Ontario. In April 2016, the band released a concept EP called Wanderer. The story examines humanity's fixation with greed, wrath and lust for power. 2016 was the year the band started touring more seriously and was the first time they ever performed in the United States. They went on to do 2 headline tours to promote Wanderer: a North-Eastern United States tour in October 2016 and an Eastern and Central Canadian tour in May 2017. In September/October 2017, Red Handed Denial opened for Protest the Hero as direct support on the "And The Quest for More Treats Tour".

In March 2019, the band released the sequel to Wanderer, a full-length 14 song concept album entitled Redeemer. The album generally received positive reviews and boasted a much heavier sound from the band. The album charted on Billboard's Heatseekers West North Central Regional Chart at #6. They went on to play 3 United States tours in 2019, which marked the first time the band played in the North-West, South-West and South-Eastern states.

In January 2020, Red Handed Denial went on their first ever West-Coast United States tour with Japanese visual-kei band, ACME. Due to the COVID-19 pandemic, their April 2020 USA tour with Hollow Front was cancelled. Guitarist Aleksei Perepelitsa amicably parted ways with the band in June 2020. Red Handed Denial released a statement saying they will be continuing as a 4-piece for the foreseeable future. The band went on to release a cover of "Telephone" by Lady Gaga and Beyoncé with a comical music video released on Lauren Babic's YouTube channel. The band was expected to record a full-length album in 2020, however, travel restrictions and the US-CAN border closure prevented them from completing the album on schedule.

== Discography ==
Albums

- Stories of Old (2013)
- Redeemer (2019)
- I'd Rather Be Asleep (2022)
- A Journey Through Virtual Dystopia (2024)

EPs

- Eyes and Liquid Skies (2009)
- Wanderer (2016)

Singles

- "Violent Delights" (2012)
- "Dirty Diana" (Michael Jackson cover) (2016)
- "Limbo (Coma)" (2017)
- "Telephone" (Lady Gaga & Beyonce cover) (2020)
- "Last Christmas" (Wham! cover) (2020)
- "Father Said" (2022)
