= Dropout Kings =

American nu metal band

- Also known as: Phoenix Down (2016-2017)
- Origin: Phoenix, Arizona, U.S.
- Genres: Nu metal, rap metal, trap metal
- Years active: 2016–present
- Labels: Suburban Noize; Stay Sick; Napalm
- Spinoff of: The Bad Chapter
- Members: Black Cat Bill; Rob Sebastian; Chucky Guzman; Joe Lana Jr.; Jeremy Garcia
- Past members: Charlie Mumbles; Tre Scott; Trevor Norgren; Staig Flynn; Adam Ramey
- Website: dropoutkingsmusic.com

Dropout Kings (formerly Phoenix Down) is an American nu metal band from Phoenix, Arizona, United States, that formed in 2016. They are currently signed to Suburban Noize Records. Dropout Kings have released three albums: Audiodope (released August 10, 2018) Riot Music (released 5 May 2023), and Yokai (released August 8 2025), and one EP: GlitchGang (released April 6, 2021).

== History ==
Dropout Kings was founded by Adam Ramey after his previous band The Bad Chapter broke up in 2015. As a way to stay active musically, he approached rapper Eddie Wellz to do a cover of Linkin Park's "Lying from You" after seeing a video of Wellz performing on YouTube. Due to positive reception, Ramey approached previous members of The Bad Chapter; Trevor Norgren and later Staig Flynn and Rob Sebastian and previous bandmates Chucky Guzman and Tre Scott from We The Collectors to form a new band called Phoenix Down, which by 2017 had changed its name to Dropout Kings.

On April 6, 2018, it was announced that Dropout Kings signed with Napalm Records, & the band released the music video for '"NVM", their first single from their debut album AudioDope the same day. On June 8, 2018, the band released the music video for "Scratch & Claw", the second single from AudioDope. AudioDope was released on August 10, 2018. AudioDope reached 2 US Charts, #52-Top New Artist Albums & #112-Record Label Independent Current Albums.

In July–August 2018, the band toured the United States and Canada with OTEP. During the Otep tour, the band announced that they were managed by Dez Fafara, the lead vocalist for DevilDriver & Coal Chamber.

In February–March 2019, the band toured with Outline in Color, Deadships and Dead Crown.

On March 19, 2019, Dayshell featured the band on their single “KOMBAT."

In May–June 2019, the band joined Crazy Town as direct support on their 20th Anniversary Tour.

On May 26, 2019, it was announced that the band would be playing the Main Stage at the 20th Annual Soopa Gathering of the Juggalos on August 3, 2019.

On April 6, 2021, it was announced that Dropout Kings had signed to Suburban Noize Records.

On June 15, 2021, Dropout Kings embarked on their first headlining tour.

On September 8, 2021, “Virus” peaked at #33 on the Billboard Mainstream Rock Radio Charts while spending 12 weeks in the Top 40.

On October 26, 2021, it was announced that “Virus” was being considered for a Grammy nomination in the Best New Artist category.

On January 24, 2022, it was announced that Dropout Kings would be playing at UFest 2022 on April 24, 2022.

On April 30, 2023, Staig parted ways with the band after his mother got into an accident.

On June 6, 2023, Chucky parted ways with the band, and Rob switched to guitar, converting the band into a permanent quartet.

Vocalist and founding member Adam Ramey died by suicide on May 19, 2025, at the age of 32.

== Members ==
=== Current members ===
- William "Black Cat Bill" Lauderdale – lead vocals (2025–present), rapping vocals (2016–present)
- Rob Sebastian – lead vocals (2025–present), guitar (2023–2025), bass (2017–present)
- Jeremy Garcia – guitars (2025–present), drums (2025)
- Joe Lana Jr. – drums (2021–2024, 2025–present)
- Chucky Guzman – guitars (2016–2023, 2025–present)

=== Former members ===
- Staig Flynn – guitars (2017–2023)
- Trevor Norgren – drums (2016–2021)
- Tre Scott – guitar, bass (2016–2017)
- Charlie Mumbles – turntables, programming (2016–2017)
- Adam Ramey – lead vocals (2016–2025; his death)

== Discography ==
=== Studio albums ===
- AudioDope (2018)
- Riot Music (2023)
- Yokai (2025)

=== EPs ===
- GlitchGang (2020 Stay Sick Recordings, reissued 2021 on Suburban Noize Records)

=== Singles ===
- "Street Sharks" (2016; as Phoenix Down)
- "NVM" (2018)
- "Scratch & Claw" (2018)
- "Going Rogue" feat. Landon Tewers (2018)
- "GlitchGang" (2020)
- "I Ain't Depressed" feat. Hacktivist (2020)
- "Virus" feat. Shayley Bourget (2021) – No. 33 Mainstream Rock Songs

=== Music videos ===
- "Street Sharks" (2016; as Phoenix Down)
- "NVM" (2018)
- "Scratch & Claw" (2018)
- "Going Rogue" (2018)
- "Bad Day" (2019)
- "Something Awful" (2019)
- "GlitchGang" (2020)
- "Virus" (2020)
- "I Ain't Depressed" (2020)
- "PitUp" (2021)
- "Hey Uh" (2022)
