= Peyton Parrish =

American musician (born 1996)

- Born: November 3, 1996 (age 29); Tarzana, California, U.S.
- Occupations: singer; songwriter
- Years active: 2019–present
- Spouse: Ardita Parrish
- Children: 1
- Musical career
- Origin: Texas, U.S.
- Genres: Metal, post-grunge,Viking metal, rock, country, Gospel, Christian Rock

Peyton Parrish (born November 3, 1996) is an American musician.

== Early life ==
Parrish was born on November 3, 1996, in Tarzana, California.

== Career ==
He gained fame in 2020 with the song "My Mother Told Me" which was used in the TV series Vikings. The following year, Peyton furthered his success with 3 Billboard number one songs, "Valhalla Calling" (cover of a song originally created by Miracle of Sound), "I'll Make a Man Out of You" from the Disney musical Mulan and "Go the Distance" from Hercules. In 2022, he released his first album. The work debuted No.1 in all iTunes genres with Rise of Vikingr. Parrish Entertainment LLC, founded in 2021, accrued work for video game commercials as well as entertainment companies.

"I'll Make a Man Out of You" sent Parrish to No. #1 on Billboard Rock Digital Song Sales charts.

== Critical reception ==
With respect to Soul, Paul Macmillan of Ghost Cult stated: "The 10-track album is a blend of rock, electronic and pop with Peyton's signature raspy vocals", going on to say that "Soul includes 'Poetry Glass,' an edgy pop-rock anthem with a catchy hook and melody". Macmillan also indicated that "The album also features 'Stuck in the Dark,' a moving ballad showcasing Peyton's vocal range, as well as 'Fallen Angel,' an uplifting song with a powerful message of inner strength".

== Discography ==
- Five Years (2019)
- Cowboy Man (2020)
- Rise of Vikingr (2022)
- The Most Magical Album on Earth (2023)
- Skalds of Metal (2023)
- Soul (2024)
- Kingdoms of Magical Rock (2024)
- EvangelCore 1 (2025)
- EvangelCore 2 (2026)

=== Singles ===
List of singles, with selected chart positions and certifications, showing year released and album name
Title	Year	Peak chart positions	Album
Title	Year	US Main. Rock	Album
"Time Bomb" (Saliva featuring Peyton Parrish)	2024	28	Revelation: Retold
"—" denotes a recording that did not chart or was not released in that territory.
