= Emily Wolfe =

American musician

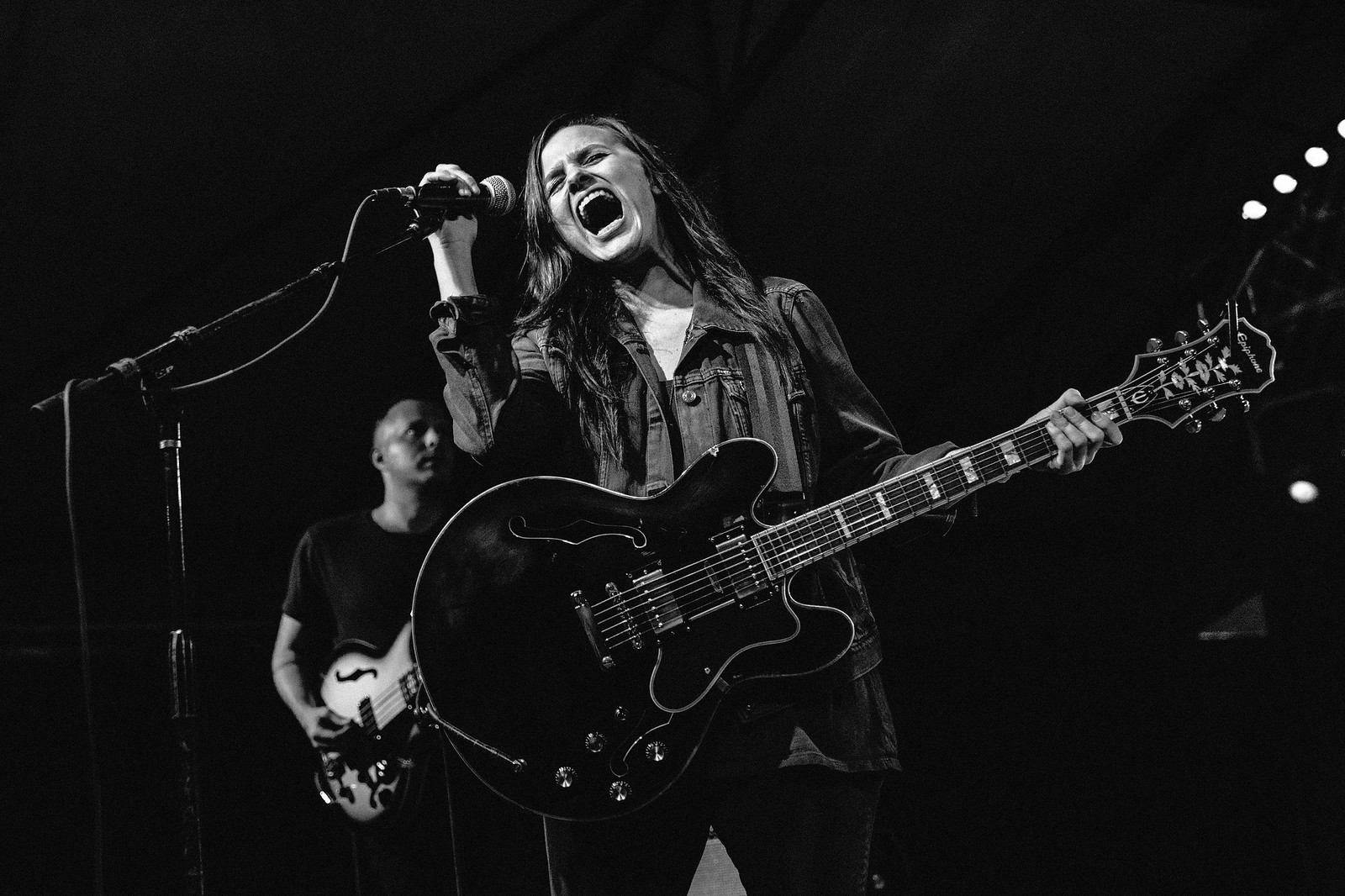
- Wolfe in February 2019

Background information
- Born: 1990 (age 35–36)
- Origin: Raleigh, North Carolina
- Genre: Rock
- Occupations: Musician, songwriter, producer
- Years active: 2012 - present
- Website: emilywolfemusic.com

Emily Wolfe is an American rock and roll musician based in Austin, Texas.

== History ==
Wolfe was born in Raleigh, North Carolina, and moved to Texas when she was 8 years old. She started playing guitar at the age of 5 and also started to play drums at an early age. In her college years at St. Edward's University she began to perform live.

== Career ==
Wolfe released her first album, Director's Notes on February 28, 2012. Her debut EP, Mechanical Hands, released on May 23, 2013, was produced by Mike McCarthy. Wolfe performed vocals and guitar, with Hannah Hagar on keys and vocals, Sam Pankey on bass, and Jeffrey Olson on drums. Wolfe released her second EP, Night & Day, on December 17, 2013.

Her third EP, Roulette, self-released in 2014, was produced by Mike McCarthy. That same year she toured with Allen Stone, performed at Austin City Limits, BottleRock Napa, and South by Southwest, and toured the west coast. In 2016, Wolfe was featured in Uproxx's "Uncharted Series" and returned for live dates on the west coast, as well as toured and performed with Gary Clark Jr., The Toadies, Heart, The Pretenders, and performed at Sound on Sound Fest in Texas. In 2016 Wolfe met with a manager from Los Angeles, and the manager told her to delete her old material as not representing her best work, so her earlier albums were withdrawn.

In 2017, she began production for her second full-length album, with Alabama Shakes keyboardist Ben Tanner (St. Paul & The Broken Bones, Dylan LeBlanc) producing. The album was recorded at Portside Sound in Muscle Shoals, Alabama, and Arlyn Studios in Austin, TX, and features Evan Nicholson on bass and Clellan Hyatt on drums. In attempting to bring to life Wolfe's dream of mixing Demi Lovato and Queens of the Stone Age, she has said, "I wanted to explore weird combinations that seem bizarre. I noticed that in pop music, whenever the chorus hits, they put this airy synth in the back of every single pop hit - I’m like, Okay, we’ve got to figure out how to make that happen. That seems to lift the chorus out of the song, making it a monster on its own. I also had a massive folder of just samples – I asked Ben to pick the coolest ones to see if we could use them on the record."

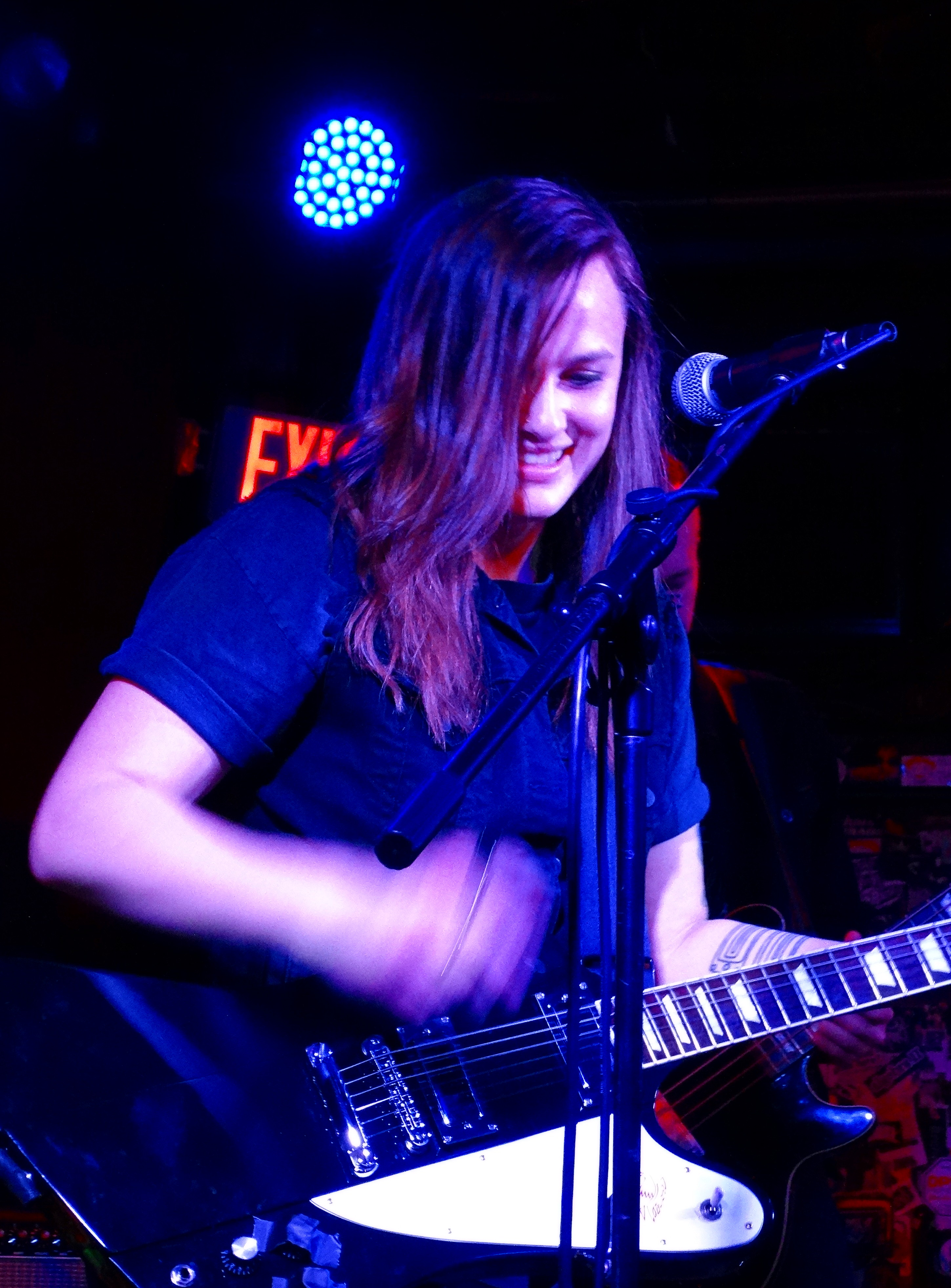
Emily Wolfe performing at The Saint in Asbury Park, NJ in February 2020

Of striving to incorporate this idea with Wolfe's live-show energy, Tanner has said, "The way pop music works - when the chorus hits or the solo hits - things get really tall, and changes in the high end and low end make it feel huge. It’s more produced than just these three people playing together in a room, but you don’t want it to be so overly produced or overly polished that it loses the flow of who Emily is an artist. A lot of it’s in the moment - if we can make it elicit an emotional response in ourselves, then hopefully it will in somebody else, too."

That self-titled, self-released album was released February 15, 2019. A co-billed tour with Black Pistol Fire followed through the east coast and midwest, followed by multiple headline dates through the east coast, midwest, and west coast, including 3rd & Lindsley in Nashville, WTMD’s First Thursday concert series in Baltimore, Baby’s All Right in Brooklyn, Lincoln Calling Festival in Nebraska, The Mint in Los Angeles, The Independent in San Francisco, and the Empty Bottle in Chicago.

In May 2019, the single “Holy Roller” was serviced to AAA radio, with support from 20+ stations, and remained on that format's charts for four-plus months. An extensive radio promotional tour included visits to stations in Nashville, Baltimore, Albany, Woodstock, Pittsburgh, and Columbus, Ohio.

In June 2021, Wolfe released her third album, Outlier, on Crows Feet Records. The album was produced by Michael Shuman of Queens of the Stone Age, who also received performance and co-writing credits on the record.

Wolfe's work has received praise from NPR, The Wall Street Journal, MTV, and numerous online and regional press outlets.

Wolfe's compositions are published by Concord Music Publishing.

On October 20, 2023, Wolfe released her fourth album, The Blowback.

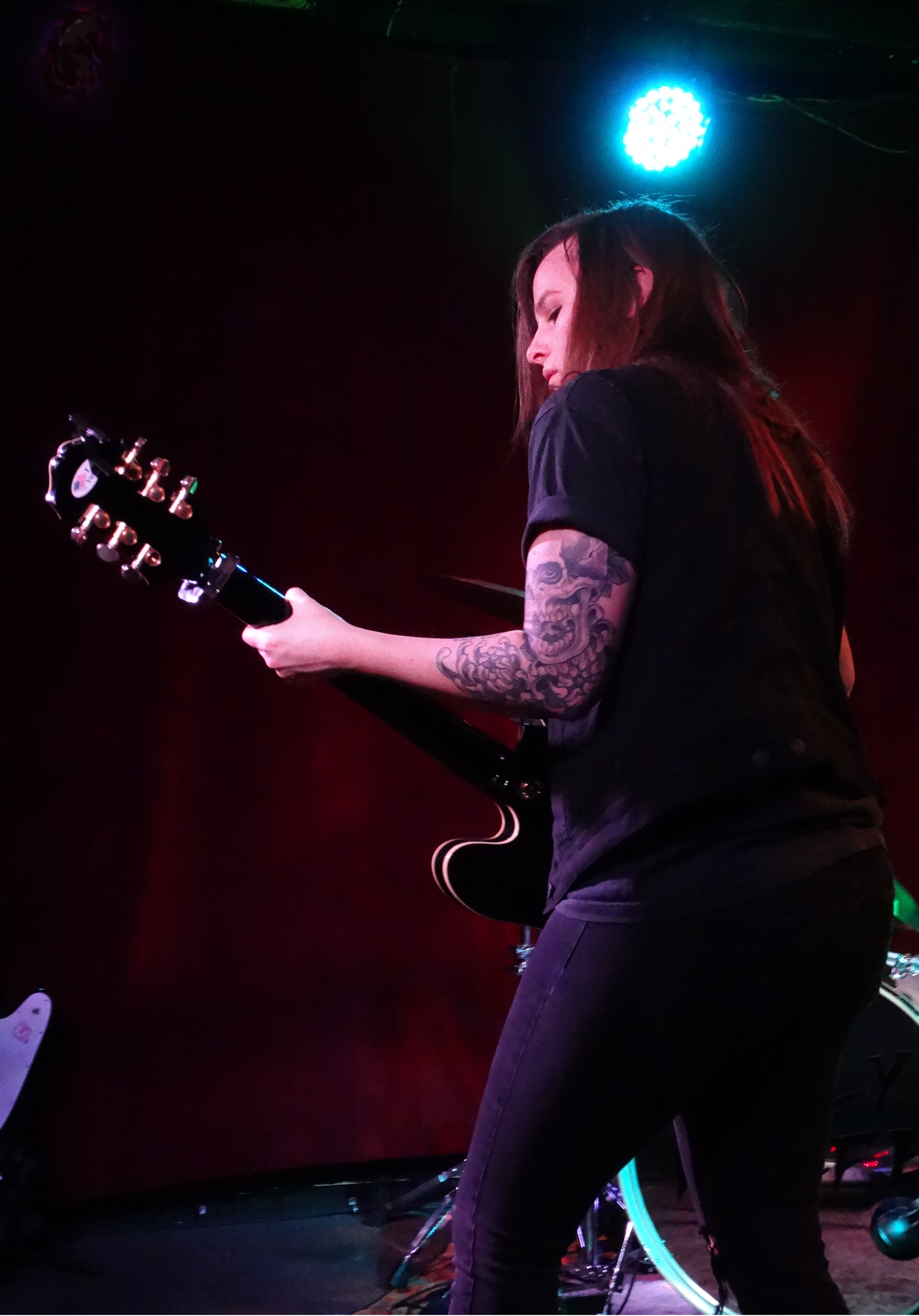
Emily Wolfe performing at The Saint in Asbury Park, NJ in February 2020

== Gear ==
Wolfe is "a self-proclaimed gear head," and designs guitar and bass pedal boards for her band "to round out her authentically gritty take on the rock genre."

Wolfe is endorsed by Gibson, Epiphone and Ernie Ball. Wolfe primarily plays an Epiphone Sheraton. In 2021, Epiphone released a signature Sheraton model for Wolfe, known as the Emily Wolfe Sheraton Stealth. In 2023, Epiphone released a second signature Sheraton, the White Wolfe.

Her pedals include a Fulltone Octafuzz, Electro-Harmonix Glove Boost, Fulltone OCD, Klon Centaur KTR, Dynatrem Tremolo, TC Electronic Alter Ego, and Earthquaker Devices Levitation.

== Discography ==
=== Studio albums ===
- Director's Notes (2012) (Withdrawn)
- Emily Wolfe (2019)
- Outlier (2021)
- The Blowback (2023)

=== EPs ===
- Mechanical Hands (2013) (Withdrawn)
- Night & Day (2013) (Withdrawn)
- Roulette (2014)

=== Singles ===
- "Swoon" (2014)
- "Atta Blues" (2016)
- "Holy Roller" (2017)
- "Crave Me" (2026)
- "Lips" (Feat. Eagles of Death Metal) (2026)
- "Power" (2026)
- "Kill Me with a Kiss" (2026)
