= Saliva discography =

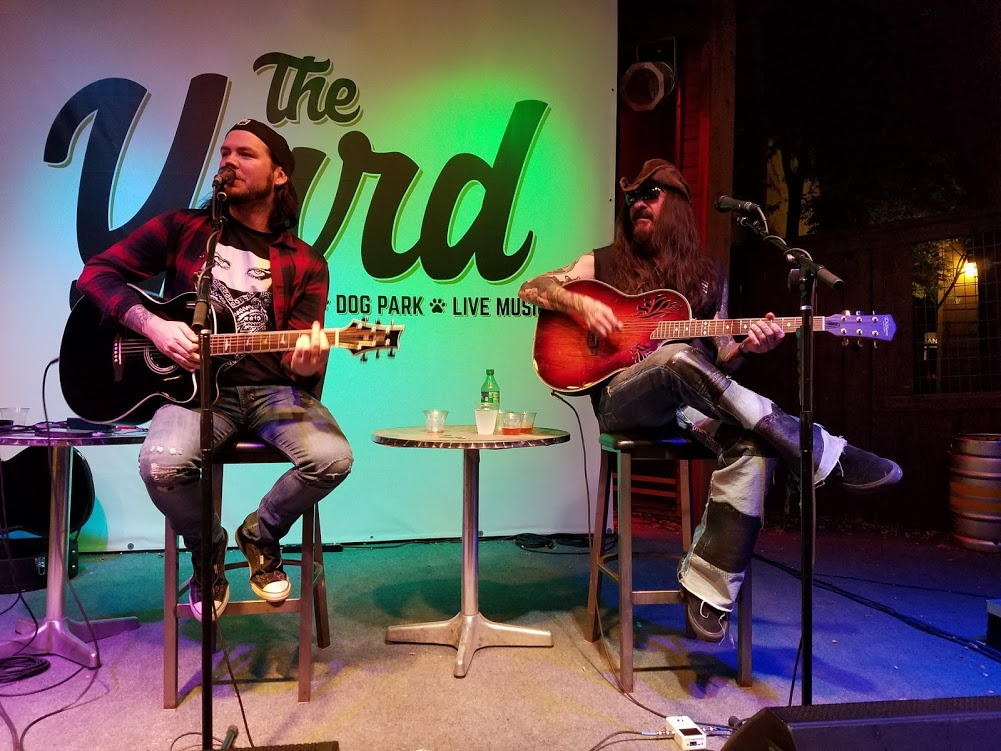
- Studio albums: 11
- Extended plays: 2
- Compilation albums: 1
- Singles: 45
- Music videos: 28

The discography of the American rock band Saliva consists of 11 studio albums, one compilation album, one extended play, and 45 singles and 28 music videos.

== Albums ==
=== Studio albums ===
List of studio albums, with selected chart positions and certifications
| Title | Album details | Peak chart positions | | | | | | | | | | Certifications |
| Title | Album details | US | US Alt. | US Hard Rock | US Rock | AUS | AUS Rock | CAN | CAN Hard Rock | UK | UK Rock | Certifications |
|---|---|---|---|---|---|---|---|---|---|---|---|---|
| Saliva | Released: August 26, 1997 (US); Label: Rockingchair; Formats: CD, digital download | — | — | — | — | — | — | — | — | — | — | |
| Every Six Seconds | Released: March 27, 2001 (US); Label: Island; Formats: CD, CS, digital download | 56 | — | — | — | — | — | — | — | — | — | RIAA: Platinum |
| Back into Your System | Released: November 12, 2002 (US); Label: Island; Formats: CD, CS, digital download | 19 | — | — | — | 86 | 10 | — | — | — | 24 | RIAA: Gold |
| Survival of the Sickest | Released: August 17, 2004 (US); Label: Island; Formats: CD, digital download | 20 | — | — | — | — | — | — | — | 192 | 19 | |
| Blood Stained Love Story | Released: January 23, 2007 (US); Label: Island; Formats: CD, digital download | 19 | — | — | 5 | — | — | 54 | 9 | — | — | |
| Cinco Diablo | Released: December 16, 2008 (US); Label: Island; Formats: CD, digital download | 104 | 17 | 14 | 24 | — | — | — | — | — | — | |
| Under Your Skin | Released: March 22, 2011 (US); Label: Island; Formats: CD, digital download | 86 | 15 | 5 | 22 | — | — | — | 8 | — | — | |
| In It to Win It | Released: September 3, 2013 (US); Label: Rum Bum; Formats: CD, digital download | — | — | — | — | — | — | — | — | — | — | |
| Love, Lies & Therapy | Released: June 10, 2016 (US); Label: Universal; Formats: CD, digital download | — | 24 | 14 | 41 | — | — | — | — | — | — | |
| 10 Lives | Released: October 19, 2018 (US); Label: Megaforce; Formats: CD, digital download | — | — | — | — | — | — | — | — | — | — | |
| Revelation | Released: September 8, 2023 (US); Label: Megaforce; Formats: CD, digital download | — | — | — | — | — | — | — | — | — | — | |
| Breaking Through | Released: August 14, 2026 (US); Label: Judge & Jury; Formats: CD, digital download | — | — | — | — | — | — | — | — | — | — | |
"—" denotes a recording that did not chart or was not released in that territory.

=== Reissued albums ===
| Year | Album details | Peak chart positions | | | |
| Year | Album details | US | US Alt. | US Hard Rock | US Rock |
|---|---|---|---|---|---|
| 2014 | Rise Up: Label: Rum Bum; Note: Reissue of 2013's In It to Win It, albeit with three tracks removed. | 158 | 25 | 10 | 40 |
| 2025 | Revelation: Retold: Label: Judge & Jury; Note: Reissue of 2023's Revelation, albeit with two of the songs re-recorded and three additional tracks added. | — | — | — | — |

=== Compilation albums ===
List of compilation albums
| Title | Album details |
|---|---|
| Moving Forward in Reverse: Greatest Hits | Released: March 23, 2010 (US); Label: Island; Formats: CD, digital download |

== Extended plays ==
List of extended plays
| Title | Details |
|---|---|
| Ladies and Gentlemen Hit Pack | Released: June 26, 2007 (US); Label: Island; Formats: CD, digital download |
| Every Twenty Years | Released: May 7, 2021 (US); Label: Megaforce; Formats: CD, digital download |

== Singles ==
List of singles, with selected chart positions and certifications, showing year released and album name
| Title | Year | Peak chart positions | | | | | | | | | | Certifications | Album |
| Title | Year | US | US Adult | US Alt. | US Heri. Rock | US Main. Rock | US Pop | AUS | AUS Rock | UK | UK Rock | Certifications | Album |
|---|---|---|---|---|---|---|---|---|---|---|---|---|---|
| "Your Disease" | 2000 | — (Note: "Your Disease" did not enter the Billboard Hot 100, but peaked at number sixteen on the Bubbling Under Hot 100 Singles chart.) | — | 7 | — | 3 | — | — | — | — | — | | Every Six Seconds |
| "Click Click Boom" | 2000 | — | — | 25 | — | 15 | — | — | — | — | — | BPI: Silver; RMNZ: Gold | Every Six Seconds |
| "After Me" | 2000 | — | — | — | — | 31 | — | — | — | — | — | | Every Six Seconds |
| "Always" | 2002 | 51 | — | 1 | — | 2 | — | 62 | 4 | 47 | 3 | | Back into Your System |
| "Rest in Pieces" | 2003 | 93 | 17 | 20 | — | 11 | — | — | — | — | — | | Back into Your System |
| "Raise Up" | 2003 | — | — | — | — | 29 | — | — | — | — | — | | Back into Your System |
| "Survival of the Sickest" | 2004 | — | — | 22 | — | 6 | — | — | — | — | — | | Survival of the Sickest |
| "Razor's Edge" (featuring Brad Arnold) | 2004 | — | — | — | — | 17 | — | — | — | — | — | | Survival of the Sickest |
| "Ladies and Gentlemen" | 2006 | — (Note: "Ladies and Gentlemen" did not enter the Billboard Hot 100, but peaked at number one on the Bubbling Under Hot 100 Singles chart.) | — | 25 | — | 2 | 96 | — | — | — | — | RIAA: Gold | Blood Stained Love Story |
| "Broken Sunday" | 2007 | — | — | — | — | 8 | — | — | — | — | — | | Blood Stained Love Story |
| "King of the Stereo" | 2007 | — | — | — | — | 24 | — | — | — | — | — | | Blood Stained Love Story |
| "Family Reunion" | 2008 | — | — | — | — | 14 | — | — | — | — | — | | Cinco Diablo |
| "How Could You?" | 2009 | — | — | — | — | 21 | — | — | — | — | — | | Cinco Diablo |
| "Southern Girls" | 2009 | — | — | — | — | — | — | — | — | — | — | | Cinco Diablo |
| "Nothing" | 2011 | — | — | — | 26 | — | — | — | — | — | — | | Under Your Skin |
| "Badass" | 2011 | — | — | — | — | 26 | — | — | — | — | — | | Under Your Skin |
| "Hate Me" | 2011 | — | — | — | — | — | — | — | — | — | — | | Under Your Skin |
| "Never Should've Let You Go" | 2011 | — | — | — | — | — | — | — | — | — | — | | Under Your Skin |
| "All Around the World" | 2012 | — | — | — | — | — | — | — | — | — | — | | Non-album single |
| "In It to Win It" | 2013 | — | — | — | — | — | — | — | — | — | — | | In It to Win It |
| "1000 Eyes" | 2013 | — | — | — | — | — | — | — | — | — | — | | In It to Win It |
| "Redneck Freakshow" | 2013 | — | — | — | — | 40 | — | — | — | — | — | | In It to Win It |
| "Rise Up" | 2014 | — | — | — | — | — | — | — | — | — | — | | Rise Up |
| "I Don't Want It" | 2015 | — | — | — | — | — | — | — | — | — | — | | Rise Up |
| "Tragic Kind of Love" | 2016 | — | — | — | — | — | — | — | — | — | — | | Love, Lies & Therapy |
| "Rx" | 2016 | — | — | — | — | — | — | — | — | — | — | | Love, Lies & Therapy |
| "Unshatter Me" | 2016 | — | — | — | — | — | — | — | — | — | — | | Love, Lies & Therapy |
| "Loneliest Know" | 2016 | — | — | — | — | — | — | — | — | — | — | | Love, Lies & Therapy |
| "Lose Yourself" | 2017 | — | — | — | — | — | — | — | — | — | — | | Non-album singles |
| "Some Thing About Love" | 2018 | — | — | — | — | — | — | — | — | — | — | | 10 Lives |
| "Epidemic" | 2019 | — | — | — | — | — | — | — | — | — | — | | 10 Lives |
| "Your Disease" | 2021 | — | — | — | — | — | — | — | — | — | — | | Every Twenty Years |
| "Click Click Boom" | 2021 | — | — | — | — | — | — | — | — | — | — | | Every Twenty Years |
| "After Me" | 2021 | — | — | — | — | — | — | — | — | — | — | | Every Twenty Years |
| "Greater Than/Less Than" | 2021 | — | — | — | — | — | — | — | — | — | — | | Every Twenty Years |
| "Revelation Man" | 2022 | — | — | — | — | — | — | — | — | — | — | | Non-album single |
| "Crows" | 2022 | — | — | — | — | 27 | — | — | — | — | — | | Revelation |
| "High on Me" | 2022 | — | — | — | — | 21 | — | — | — | — | — | | Revelation |
| "Come Back Stronger" | 2023 | — | — | — | — | — | — | — | — | — | — | | Revelation |
| "Time Bomb" (featuring Peyton Parrish) | 2024 | — | — | — | — | 28 | — | — | — | — | — | | Revelation: Retold |
| "Hit 'Em When It Hurts" | 2025 | — | — | — | — | — | — | — | — | — | — | | Breaking Through |
| "Too Broke to Fix" (with The Founder) | 2025 | — | — | — | — | — | — | — | — | — | — | | Breaking Through |
| "Starless" (with LYLVC) | 2026 | — | — | — | — | 29 | — | — | — | — | — | | TBA |
| "Cope" (with Trevor McNevan) | 2026 | — | — | — | — | — | — | — | — | — | — | | Breaking Through |
| "Sadistic Love" | 2026 | — | — | — | — | — | — | — | — | — | — | | Breaking Through |
| "Edge of a Knife" | 2026 | — | — | — | — | — | — | — | — | — | — | | Breaking Through |
| "Do Something Wrong" (with Goroda) | 2026 | — | — | — | — | — | — | — | — | — | — | | TBA |
| "Longshot" (with Johnny Van Zant of Lynyrd Skynyrd) | 2026 | — | — | — | — | — | — | — | — | — | — | | Breaking Through |
| Break Free" (with GORODA & The Red Jumpsuit Apparatus) | 2026 | — | — | — | — | — | — | — | — | — | — | | TBA |
"—" denotes a recording that did not chart or was not released in that territory.

== Guest appearances ==
List of non-single guest appearances, showing year released and album name
| Title | Year | Album |
|---|---|---|
| "Spy Hunter" | 2001 | Spy Hunter soundtrack |
| "Pin Cushion" | 2001 | Ginger Snaps soundtrack |
| "Message of Love" | 2001 | Not Another Teen Movie soundtrack |
| "Superstar" | 2001 | More Fast and Furious |
| "800" | 2002 | Resident Evil: Music from and Inspired by the Original Motion Picture |
| "Turn the Tables" | 2002 | WWF: Forceable Entry |
| "King of My World" | 2002 | WWE Anthology |
| "Bleed for Me" | 2003 | Daredevil: The Album |
| "Time" | 2003 | Lara Croft Tomb Raider: The Cradle of Life soundtrack |
| "I Walk Alone" | 2006 | WWE: Wreckless Intent |
| "Don't Question My Heart" (featuring Brent Smith) | 2008 | WWE: The Music, Vol. 8 |
| "Sincerity (You Were Never There For Me)" (featuring Harper, Lyric Noel) | 2025 | Insincerity |
| "Worlds Apart" | 2025 | TBA |
| "Starless" | 2026 | TBA |
| "Do Something Wrong" | 2026 | TBA |
| "Break Free" | 2026 | TBA |

== Music videos ==
List of music videos, showing year released and directors
| Title | Year | Director(s) |
|---|---|---|
| "Your Disease" | 2000 | Dave Meyers |
| "Click Click Boom" | 2000 | Marc Klasfeld |
| "Spyhunter" | 2000 | Unknown |
| "Always" | 2002 | Charles Infante |
| "Rest in Pieces" | 2002 | Diane Martel |
| "Survival of the Sickest" | 2004 | Wayne Isham |
| "Ladies and Gentlemen" | 2006 | Stephen Penta |
| "Broken Sunday" (Live) | 2007 | Tim Lewis |
| "King of the Stereo" | 2007 | Tim Walbert |
| "How Could You?" | 2008 | Scott Culver |
| "Badass" | 2011 | P. R. Brown |
| "Rise Up" | 2014 | Jon Vulpine |
| "Tragic Kind of Love" | 2016 | Unknown |
| "After Me" (2021) | 2021 | Unknown |
| "Revelation Man" | 2022 | Unknown |
| "Breakdown" | 2022 | Unknown |
| "Crows" | 2022 | Unknown |
| "High on Me" | 2023 | Unknown |
| "Come Back Stronger" | 2023 | Unknown |
| "Time Bomb" | 2024 | Mason Wright |
| "Devil's World" | 2025 | Unknown |
| "Horizon: Retold" | 2025 | Melody Myers |
| "High on Me: Retold" | 2025 | Unknown |
| "Crowd Goes Wild" | 2025 | Unknown |
| "Too Broke to Fix" | 2025 | Thomas Crane |
| "Starless" | 2026 | Scott B. Hansen |
| "Cope" | 2026 | Unknown |
| "Sadistic Love" | 2026 | Toddi Babu |
| "Edge of a Knife" | 2026 | Toddi Babu |
| "Longshot" | 2026 | Thomas Crane |
| "Breaking Through" | 2026 | Toddi Babu |
| "Sin City Mistress" | 2026 | Gray Taylors |
| "Rivers" | 2026 | Gray Taylors |
