= Always (Saliva song) =

2002 single by Saliva

Single by Saliva

from the album Back into Your System
- Released: 2002
- Genre: Post-grunge; nu metal; alternative rock
- Length: 3:51
- Label: Island
- Songwriters: Bob Marlette; Josey Scott
- Producer: Bob Marlette

Saliva singles chronology
"After Me" (2001)	"Always" (2002)	"Rest In Pieces" (2003)

Music video
- "Always" on YouTube

"Always" is a song by American rock band Saliva. It was released in 2002 as the first single from their third studio album Back into Your System (2002). The song reached number one on the Billboard Modern Rock Tracks chart for one week in February 2003, making this Saliva's only number-one hit in their career. "Always" also peaked at number 51 on the Billboard Hot 100, the band's highest-charted single on that chart. It reached the top 50 in countries like Ireland and the UK. The accompanying music video for the song, directed by Charles Infante, features a man roaming around the city being haunted by the spirit of a woman from his past.

== Critical reception ==
Brian O'Neill of AllMusic gave the song "Always" a "Track Pick" tag, describing it as "histrionic" and encapsulating the melodrama from Kiss' Animalize.

== Chart performance ==
"Always" reached number one on the Billboard Modern Rock Tracks chart for the week of February 1, 2003. This remains Saliva's only number-one hit in their career. For the week of December 14, 2002, the song debuted at number 70 on the Billboard Hot 100. It reached a peak position of number 51 the week of February 15, 2003. To date, it is the band's highest-charted single on that chart. The song also charted in the UK and Ireland, debuting at numbers 47 and 48 for the weeks of March 6 and 9, 2003, respectively, before leaving the next week. In Australia, it charted at number 62 the week of March 10, 2003.

== Music video ==
Directed by Charles Infante, the video focuses on a young man, played by Steven Kozlowski, who appears to be haunted by a woman of his past, sporadically appearing throughout the empty city. The band is seen playing in the street while the man is running around the city. The video ends with the man, frustrated, destroying a telephone booth before sitting on the ground, crying. MTV requested an edit of the lyrics in the final verse. The line "the pistol shaking in my hand, and all I can hear is the sound" was edited to replace the word "pistol" with "anger" in the video version.

== Uses in media ==
"Always" was the theme song for WWE's Survivor Series pay-per-view in November 2002. It was featured in the 2010 music video game Guitar Hero: Warriors of Rock as a downloadable content song.

== Track listing ==
No.	Title	Length
1.	"Always (Radio Edit)"	3:51
2.	"Click Click Boom (Album Version)"	4:14
3.	"Your Disease (Album Version)"	3:57
4.	"Always (Video)"	3:58

- "Always (Radio Edit)" bears no difference to the album version, but "Always (Video)" is censored; the word "pistol" is replaced with the word "anger".

== Charts ==
Chart (2003)	Peak position
Australia (ARIA)	62
Ireland (IRMA)	48
Scottish Singles Sales (Official Charts)	38
UK Singles (Official Charts)	47
UK Rock & Metal (Official Charts)	3
US Billboard Hot 100	51
US Alternative Airplay (Billboard)	1
US Mainstream Rock Airplay (Billboard)	2

== See also ==
- List of Billboard Alternative Songs number ones of the 2000s
