= Saliva (disambiguation) =

The term "saliva" may refer to:

- Saliva, spittle
- Saliva (band), an American rock band
  - Saliva (album), the band's debut album
- "Saliva" (MF Doom song)
- "Saliva" (Thalía song)
- Səliva, a village in Azerbaijan
- Saliba language (also referred to as Sáliva), an indigenous Colombian language
