= Cinco Diablo =

Studio album by Saliva
- Released: December 16, 2008
- Recorded: 2008
- Studios: The Blue Room (Woodland Hills, California); Henson Recording (Hollywood, California)
- Length: 37:50
- Label: Island
- Producer: Bob Marlette

Saliva chronology
Blood Stained Love Story (2007)	Cinco Diablo (2008)	Moving Forward in Reverse: Greatest Hits (2010)

Singles from Blood Stained Love Story
- 1. "Family Reunion" Released: November 2008; 2. "How Could You?" Released: March 17, 2009; 3. "Southern Girls" Released: 2009

Professional ratings
Review scores
Source	Rating
AllMusic	3.5/5 stars
Melodic.net	4/5 stars
Rawkfist Music	1.5/10 stars
Sputnikmusic	3/5
Tunelab	2/10 stars

Cinco Diablo is the sixth studio album by American rock band Saliva. It was released on December 16, 2008. Its first single was "Family Reunion" launched onto iTunes on October 28, 2008. The album debuted at #104 on the Billboard 200, making it their lowest-charting album in the band's history, and their first to chart outside the top 100.

It is their final album to feature rhythm guitarist Jonathan Montoya, who would leave the band in 2010.

== Release ==
The album was accompanied by the release of "Family Reunion" as its first single. It was released in November 2008. Lead singer Josey Scott has said that the song is about meeting their fans on the road. The song peaked at number 14 on Billboard's Mainstream Rock Tracks chart in 2008.

A deluxe edition of the album is available exclusively from Best Buy, and it includes a 30 Minute Long Live DVD. A music video has been filmed for "How Could You?", the second single.

== Legacy ==
"Hunt You Down" was named the official theme song to WWE's PPV event, WWE No Way Out 2009 as well as CMT's Dog and Beth: On the Hunt. The song "Family Reunion" could be heard during NCAA college basketball games televised on ESPN during the 2008–2009 season. It is also used by the Erie Otters during their pregame highlight video.

== Track listing ==
All songs by Saliva and Bob Marlette.

No.	Title	Length
1.	"Family Reunion"	3:39
2.	"My Own Worst Enemy" (featuring Brent Smith of Shinedown)	3:07
3.	"Best of Me"	3:48
4.	"How Could You?"	3:23
5.	"Hunt You Down"	3:36
6.	"Judgment Day"	4:34
7.	"Forever and a Day"	3:28
8.	"I'm Coming Back"	3:50
9.	"Southern Girls"	3:31
10.	"So Long"	4:46
11.	"Hit Me (U.S. Exclusive iTunes Bonus Track)"	3:40
12.	"King of the Crossroads (Amazon mp3 bonus track)"	6:12
Total length:		41:22

== Best Buy Exclusive: Bonus 30 Minute Live DVD track listing ==
(Filmed at Chicago's House of Blues 11/07)

Menu: "I'm Coming Back" (from Cinco Diablo)

No.	Title	Length
1.	"Black Sheep"	5:11
2.	"Click Click Boom"	4:44
3.	"King Of The Stereo"	3:59
4.	"Ladies and Gentlemen"	4:39
5.	"Always"	4:01
6.	"Your Disease"	5:14

== Credits ==
Credits adapted from album's liner notes.

Saliva

- Josey Scott — lead vocals
- Wayne Swinny — lead guitar, backing vocals
- Jonathan Montoya — rhythm guitar
- Dave Novotny — bass, backing vocals
- Paul Crosby — drums

Production

- Bob Marlette — producer, engineer, mixing
- Sid Riggs — Pro Tools, editing
- Ryan J-W Smith — mastering
