= Rise Up (Saliva album) =

Studio album (reissue) by Saliva
- Released: April 29, 2014
- Studio: East Side Manor Studios (Nashville, Tennessee); 16th Edge Studios (Nashville, Tennessee); Little City Studios (Nashville, Tennessee)
- Length: 41:54
- Label: Rum Bum Records
- Producer: Bobby Huff

Saliva chronology
In It to Win It (2013)	Rise Up (2014)	Love, Lies & Therapy (2016)

Singles from Rise Up
- 1. "In It to Win It" Released: April 30, 2013; 2. "1000 Eyes" Released: 2013; 3. "Redneck Freakshow" Released: October 4, 2013; 4. "Rise Up" Released: January 24, 2014; 5. "I Don't Want It" Released: 2014

Rise Up is a reissue of American rock band Saliva's eighth studio album In It to Win It. The record was released on April 29, 2014. It is the last album to feature bassist Dave Novotny who was replaced by Brad Stewart. The album charted at 158 on the Billboard 200.

== Background ==
The record is a re-release of their previous album In It to Win It. It features all of its songs except "Animal", "Flesh", and "I.D.N.A.E". Previous vocalist Josey Scott left the band in 2012 and was replaced with Bobby Amaru.

== Track listing ==
No.	Title	Length
1.	"Rise Up"	3:08
2.	"She Can Sure Hide Crazy"	2:59
3.	"No One But Me"	4:53
4.	"Lost"	3:45
5.	"1000 Eyes"	3:33
6.	"Redneck Freakshow"	3:10
7.	"Choke"	3:30
8.	"Army"	3:08
9.	"Closer"	3:22
10.	"In It to Win It"	3:59
11.	"The Enemy"	2:56
12.	"I Don’t Want It"	3:31
Total length:		41:54

*Mastered by Ted Jensen at Sterling Sound, NYC

== Personnel ==
- Bobby Amaru – lead vocals
- Wayne Swinny – lead guitar
- Dave Novotny – bass, backing vocals
- Paul Crosby – drums
