= Family Reunion (Saliva song) =

Single by Saliva

from the album Cinco Diablo
- Released: November 2008
- Recorded: 2008
- Genre: Nu metal; rap rock; southern rock
- Length: 3:39
- Label: Island Records
- Songwriters: Josey Scott; Jonathan Montoya; Wayne Swinny; Paul Crosby; Dave Novotny; Bob Marlette
- Producer: Marlette

Saliva singles chronology
"King of the Stereo" (2007)	"Family Reunion" (2008)	"How Could You?" (2009)

"Family Reunion" is a song by American nu metal band Saliva, released in November 2008 as the lead single from their sixth studio album, Cinco Diablo.

== Composition and style ==
Musically, "Family Reunion" is a nu metal and rap rock song that also incorporates a "down home southern rock feel," according to Melodic.net reviewer Troy Kramm. Stephen Thomas Erlewine of AllMusic noted the band "dabble(s) in a little bit of awkward rap-rock" on the track.

== Reception ==
The song received significant airplay on mainstream rock radio formats. Kramm noted its ubiquitous radio presence was "for good reason," praising its anthemic quality.

== Charts ==
Chart (2008)	Peak position
US Mainstream Rock (Billboard)	14

== Use in media ==
In a 2009 interview with WWE.com, lead singer Josey Scott described "Family Reunion" as "an open letter to our fans -- giving them some love and appreciation for all the years they supported us."

== Credits and personnel ==
Credits are adapted from the Cinco Diablo liner notes.

- Josey Scott – lead vocals, songwriting
- Wayne Swinny – guitar, songwriting
- Jonathan Montoya – guitar, songwriting
- Dave Novotny – bass guitar, songwriting
- Paul Crosby – drums, songwriting
- Bob Marlette – production, songwriting, mixing
