= Survival of the Sickest =

Survival of the Sickest may refer to:

- Survival of the Sickest (album), an album by American rock band Saliva
- "Survival of the Sickest" (song), a 2004 song by American rock band Saliva
- Survival of the Sickest (book), a 2007 book by Canadian-American author Sharon Moalem
- Survival of the Sickest (Bloodbath album), a 2022 album by Swedish death metal supergroup Bloodbath
