= Under Your Skin (album) =

- cover art featuring Adriana Lima

Studio album by Saliva
- Released: March 22, 2011
- Recorded: 2010
- Studio: Bay 7 Studios (Valley Village, California) Sparky Darky Studios (Calabasas, California)
- Genre: Post-grunge
- Length: 33:39
- Label: Island
- Producer: Howard Benson

Saliva chronology
Moving Forward in Reverse: Greatest Hits (2010)	Under Your Skin (2011)	In It to Win It (2013)

Singles from Under Your Skin
- 1. "Nothing" Released: January 25, 2011; 2. "Badass" Released: March 8, 2011; 3. "Hate Me" Released: May 22, 2011; 4. "Never Should've Let You Go" Released: 2011 (Radio)

Professional ratings
Review scores
Source	Rating
AllMusic	3/5 stars
Melodic.net	4/5 stars
Rockfreaks.net	5/10 stars

Under Your Skin is the seventh studio album by American rock band Saliva, released on March 22, 2011. It is the final album to feature singer Josey Scott, who left the band in 2012. It is also their last album to be released on Island Records. Prior to release, the album had been titled both Take That Society and Skin Deep.

== History ==
In September 2009, Scott said the album was "coming along nicely". So far, he had written about nine songs and the rest of the band - which at the time of the interview included guitarist Wayne Swinny, bassist Dave Novotny, drummer Paul Crosby, and guitarist Jonathan Montoya – had been writing material as well.

On January 12, 2011 Tunelab reported that the title of the upcoming Saliva album has changed again, from Skin Deep to Under Your Skin. The album was released on March 22, 2011. The first single from the album, "Nothing", impacted radio on January 25 and was released for digital download on February 1.

"Badass" became the album's second single. It was released on March 8, 2011. It went on to enjoy more success than the album's first single, "Nothing," by peaking at No. 26 on Billboard's Mainstream Rock Tracks. "Badass" was also featured in the film Saw 3D.

"Under Your Skin" was released on March 22, 2011. It debuted at No. 86 in the U.S. Billboard 200, higher than Saliva's previous studio album, "Cinco Diablo", which peaked at No. 104 on the same chart.

== Track listing ==
No.	Title	Writer(s)	Length
1.	"Badass"	Bobby Huff, Wayne Swinny, Josey Scott	3:05
2.	"Better Days"	Dave Novotny, Paul Crosby, Dave Bassett	3:40
3.	"Nothing"	Novotny, Crosby, Huff	3:07
4.	"Hate Me"	Novotny, Crosby, Zac Maloy	4:02
5.	"Never Should've Let You Go"	Huff, Swinny	3:33
6.	"Prove Me Wrong"	Novotny	3:30
7.	"Burn It Up"	Novotny, Crosby, Huff	2:57
8.	"Toxic Suicide"	Novotny	2:45
9.	"Turn the Lights On"	Novotny, Crosby, Bassett	3:49
10.	"Spotlight"	Novotny, Maloy	3:11
Total length:			33:39

=== Other tracks ===
A week before the album was released, the band put the entire album up on their website for streaming. On the first day two songs were listed as well as streamed and "Spotlight" was not.

- "Get Out Alive" - 3:40
- "The Key" - 4:06

== Personnel ==
- Josey Scott - lead vocals, acoustic guitar, percussion
- Wayne Swinny - guitars, backing vocals
- Dave Novotny - bass, backing vocals
- Paul Crosby - drums

== Charts ==
=== Weekly charts ===
Album
Chart (2011)	Peak position
Billboard Hard Rock Albums	5
Billboard Alternative Albums	15
Billboard Rock Albums	22
Billboard 200	86

=== Singles ===
Year	Single	Peak positions
Year	Single	Billboard Mainstream Rock Tracks
2011	"Nothing"	-
2011	"Badass"	26
2011	"Hate Me"	-
