= Ladies and Gentlemen (song) =

Single by Saliva

from the album Blood Stained Love Story
- Released: November 7, 2006
- Recorded: 2006
- Genre: Alternative metal
- Length: 3:37
- Label: Island
- Songwriters: Paul Crosby; Bob Marlette; David Novotny; Josey Scott; Wayne Swinny
- Producer: Bob Marlette

Saliva singles chronology
"Razor's Edge" (2004)	"Ladies and Gentlemen" (2006)	"Broken Sunday" (2007)

Music video
- "Ladies and Gentlemen" on YouTube

"Ladies and Gentlemen" is a song by American rock band Saliva. It was released in November 2006 as the first single off their fifth studio album Blood Stained Love Story (2007). The song received negative reviews from critics. "Ladies and Gentlemen" peaked at numbers 2 and 25 on both the Billboard Mainstream Rock and Alternative Songs charts respectively, and is also the band's best-selling single, being certified Gold by the Recording Industry Association of America (RIAA) in 2010. An accompanying music video for the song, directed by Stephen Penta, features two women boxing each other in a ring while lead singer Josey Scott plays the role of an announcer, trainer and referee throughout the video.

== Background ==
Lead singer Josey Scott said the band was trying to write "a song that was filled with dynamics that we knew the sporting community would love and video games and movies would love." After having written 9 or 10 songs for the album already, Scott was brainstorming with producer Bob Marlette. Scott told the producer, "What if I do the verses like a circus announcer? Remember when you were a kid and you go to the circus and the ringmaster comes out? 'Ladies and gentlemen'." Scott thought Marlette would ridicule him for the idea, but Marlette thought it was brilliant.

Scott also said the pre-chorus lyric, "Welcome to the show", was emulating Def Leppard, and he put the word "boom" in the chorus because the last time Saliva said "boom" in a song ("Click Click Boom"), it was licensed for several sports arenas, video games, and movie trailers.

== Critical reception ==
"Ladies and Gentlemen" garnered negative reviews from music critics. Rolling Stone's Christian Hoard criticized the song for being "crappy arena metal". PopMatters contributor Andrew Blackie found it "painfully unnecessary", describing it as "[A] third-rate downtuned distortion-fest, the verses aren’t so much sung as spoken... in a monotonous swagger." Conversely, Clark Collis of Entertainment Weekly praised Saliva for infusing the song with a "bright, leavening pop sensibility."

== Music video ==
Directed by Stephen Penta, the video takes place in a ring where two former Suicide Girls models are boxing each other, while lead singer Josey Scott is playing "multiple roles including announcer, trainer and referee."

== Uses in media ==
The song was the official theme song for the World Wrestling Entertainment pay-per-view, WrestleMania 23. In an interview with WWE.com, frontman Josey Scott stated that the song was written with the event in mind for WWE, saying "That's what we wrote it for. We wrote it for our friends at WWE". It was also used on the NFL Network during coverage of Super Bowl XLI and the BBC HD channel's Christmas 2008 promotional advertisement, which showcased some of the movies and TV shows the channel was showing during the Christmas period. It was also used the theme for the 2007 annual AST Dew Tour, Universe of Entertainment commercials for the Sony PlayStation 3 and the television spots for the 2009 film Star Trek.

NHRA has also used the song for their Drag Racing since 2007. The song has also appeared in the 2008 film Jumper. It was the song featured in the Calgary Flames opening video in 2008-09 NHL season, as well as for the first NHL Winter classic in 2008 in Buffalo, New York. The song was also used as the theme song for the 2008 Sharpie 500 at Bristol Motor Speedway. The song is used as the background music to the intro video for the Ohio State Buckeyes men's ice hockey 2010 season during home games. The syndicated radio program The Rick and Bubba Radio Show also has been known to use the song as a bumper after the commercial break. The song was used during the landing of the C-130 plane "Fat Albert" at the naval air base in Belle Chasse, Louisiana, during the N'Awlins air show of May 2011.

The song is the opening theme song for the MLB Network show Intentional Talk starting with the April 4, 2016 episode.

== Charts ==
=== Weekly charts ===
Weekly chart performance for "Ladies and Gentlemen"
Chart (2007)	Peak position
US Alternative Airplay (Billboard)	25
US Mainstream Rock (Billboard)	2
US Pop 100 (Billboard)	96

=== Year-end charts ===
Year-end chart performance for "Ladies and Gentlemen"
Chart (2007)	Position
US Mainstream Rock Songs (Billboard)	8

== Certifications ==
Certifications and sales for "Ladies and Gentlemen"
Region	Certification	Certified units/sales
United States (RIAA)	Gold	500,000^{*}
^{*} Sales figures based on certification alone.
