= Blood Stained Love Story =

Studio album by Saliva
- Released: January 23, 2007
- Recorded: 2006
- Studios: The Blue Room (Woodland Hills, California); Sound City (Van Nuys, California)
- Genres: Rap rock, post-grunge
- Length: 39:58
- Label: Island
- Producer: Bob Marlette

Saliva chronology
Survival of the Sickest (2004)	Blood Stained Love Story (2007)	Cinco Diablo (2008)

Singles from Blood Stained Love Story
- 1. "Ladies and Gentlemen" Released: November 7, 2006; 2. "Broken Sunday" Released: June 19, 2007; 3. "King of the Stereo" Released: 2007

Blood Stained Love Story is the fifth studio album by American rock band Saliva which was released on January 23, 2007. This is their first album with rhythm guitarist Jonathan Montoya after the departure of Chris D’Abaldo. The song "Ladies and Gentlemen" was the official theme song for the WWE PPV WrestleMania 23. It also has appeared on many other sporting event telecasts. The song "King Of The Stereo" was modified and featured as ESPN Varsity Inc's Theme song, under the name "King Of The Stadium" with appropriately edited lyrics. The original title for the album was The Rise & Fall Of The Glorified Kingdom.

The album debuted on the Billboard 200 at number 19, selling 31,000 copies in its first week.

== Critical reception ==
Professional ratings
Review scores
Source	Rating
AllMusic	2/5 stars
Alternative Addiction	2/5 stars
Entertainment Weekly	B
Melodic	4.5/5 stars
Metal Hammer	3/10 stars
PopMatters	5/10 stars
Rolling Stone	2/5 stars
Sputnikmusic	2/5
Tunelab Music	7/10 stars

PopMatters contributor Andrew Blackie was mixed about the record, calling it "one of the strongest entries in the nu-metal crew's catalog" for showing maturation in their musicianship and experimenting with different instruments but felt it defaults into either "redundancy or washout" to reveal their worst qualities on tracks that are just "slightly sappy and/or melodramatic" and contain "king-size cliché[s]" lyrics, saying that "[I]t's not the first option you'd want to check out if you're looking for the best of what's on radio, therefore; but if this is already your type of music and you're willing to sit through the plain awful among the tentatively good, then it may well satisfy." AllMusic's Stephen Thomas Erlewine noted how the album mixes their usual nu-metal techniques with "'90s heavy rock clichés" that emulate bands ranging from Nirvana ("Black Sheep"), Creed ("Starting Over") and Third Eye Blind ("Never Gonna Change"), and that it sounds like "a record designed to rule the charts in 2000 instead of 2007," concluding that "There's not much hunger here, but there is precision, along with a creeping sense of maturity in how they polish their craft and now sound more comfortable with power ballads than they do with hard rockers." Rolling Stone's Christian Hoard said, "The fourth album from this Memphis quintet rocks like a motherfucker, tosses in atmospheric keys and shimmery sound effects, and drops a couple of slow ones. But there's no remedy for crappy arena metal like "Ladies and Gentlemen" and mushy radio filler like "Starting Over."" A writer for Alternative Addiction compared the record negatively to their 2002 effort Back into Your System, saying the songs weren't as heartfelt and passionate than the ones found on that record and was too simplistic by going back to the "style over substance" days of Every Six Seconds, concluding that "Saliva takes a big step backwards with Blood Stained Love Story, but let’s hope they recover to old form. This band can produce great albums with lots of hits. It just didn’t happen this time around."

== Track listing ==
All songs by Saliva and Bob Marlette.

No.	Title	Length
1.	"Ladies and Gentlemen"	3:37
2.	"Broken Sunday"	3:53
3.	"Never Gonna Change"	4:09
4.	"King of the Stereo"	3:42
5.	"One More Chance"	3:55
6.	"Going Under"	3:56
7.	"Twister"	3:18
8.	"Black Sheep (feat. John 5)"	5:23
9.	"Starting Over"	3:59
10.	"Here with You"	4:06
Total length:		39:58

Best Buy sold a limited-edition version of Blood Stained Love Story that includes a bonus disc with the following bonus tracks:

No.	Title	Length
1.	"Is It You"	3:43
2.	"Write Your Name"	3:28

== Credits ==
Credits adapted from album’s liner notes.

Saliva

- Josey Scott - lead vocals
- Wayne Swinny - lead guitar, backing vocals
- Jonathan Montoya - rhythm guitar, backing vocals
- Dave Novotny - bass, backing vocals
- Paul Crosby - drums

Production

- Bob Marlette — producer, engineer, mixing
- Sid Riggs — Pro Tools, editing, electronic sound design
- Howie Weinberg — mastering

== Chart positions ==
Album

Chart (2007)	Peak position
US Billboard 200	19

Singles

Year	Single	Chart	Position
2007	"Ladies and Gentlemen"	Pop 100	96
2007	"Ladies and Gentlemen"	Bubbling Under Hot 100	1
2007	"Ladies and Gentlemen"	Mainstream Rock Tracks	2
2007	"Ladies and Gentlemen"	Modern Rock Tracks	25
2007	"Broken Sunday"	Mainstream Rock Tracks	8
2007	"King of the Stereo"	Mainstream Rock Tracks	24
