= Survival of the Sickest (song) =

Single by Saliva

from the album Survival of the Sickest
- Released: June 15, 2004
- Recorded: 2003–2004
- Genre: Hard rock
- Length: 4:08
- Label: Island
- Songwriters: Josey Scott; Wayne Swinny; Paul Crosby; Chris D'Abaldo; David Novotny
- Producer: Paul Ebersold

Saliva singles chronology
"Raise Up" (2003)	"Survival of the Sickest" (2004)	"Razor's Edge" (2004)

Music video
- "Survival of the Sickest" on YouTube

"Survival of the Sickest" is a song by American rock band Saliva. It was released in June 2004 as the first single off their fourth album of the same name (2004). The song received positive reviews from critics. "Survival of the Sickest" peaked at numbers 6 and 22 on both the Billboard Mainstream Rock and Alternative Songs charts respectively. The accompanying music video for the song, directed by Wayne Isham, features two girls going backstage to a Saliva concert. It was featured in the video game NASCAR 2005: Chase for the Cup and was the official theme song for WWE's Unforgiven 2004 pay per view.

== Critical reception ==
"Survival of the Sickest" garnered positive reviews from music critics. Johnny Loftus from AllMusic highlighted the song as a "Track Pick" and put it alongside "One Night Only" as tracks that "happily revels in twin guitars and two-girls-for-every-guy rock star debauchery." Entertainment Weekly writer Sean Richardson called the track a "retro party anthem" that pays "rollicking tribute" to '80s hair metal. Bram Teitelman of Billboard praised the song for being a "high-octane, well-oiled rocker" that continues the band's penchant to craft "solid rock tracks", concluding that "Modern rock is coming to the party as well, ensuring that the song's chances for survival at radio are good."

== Music video ==
The video was shot in Los Angeles' Grand Olympic Auditorium on July 20, 2004. Directed by Wayne Isham, the video follows two girls going to the backstage VIP area of a Saliva concert. After passing the time in the location, Josey Scott arrives to join the girls but the viewers are left to their "own imagination for the seedy details" when Scott "slams the door in the camera's face".

== Charts ==
=== Weekly charts ===
Weekly chart performance for "Survival of the Sickest"
Chart (2004)	Peak position
US Alternative Airplay (Billboard)	22
US Mainstream Rock (Billboard)	6

=== Year-end charts ===
Year-end chart performance for "Survival of the Sickest"
Chart (2004)	Position
US Mainstream Rock Tracks (Billboard)	27
US Modern Rock Tracks (Billboard)	92
