= In It to Win It (Saliva album) =

Studio album by Saliva
- Released: September 3, 2013
- Recorded: 2013
- Studio: East Side Manor Studios (Nashville, Tennessee); 16th Edge Studios (Nashville, Tennessee); Little City Studios (Nashville, Tennessee)
- Length: 44:57 (standard edition); 51:45 (iTunes deluxe edition)
- Label: Rum Bum Records
- Producer: Bobby Huff

Saliva chronology
Under Your Skin (2011)	In It to Win It (2013)	Rise Up (2014)

Singles from In It to Win It
- 1. "In It to Win It" Released: April 30, 2013; 2. "1000 Eyes" Released: 2013; 3. "Redneck Freakshow" Released: October 4, 2013; 4. "Rise Up" Released: January 24, 2014 (9th studio album)

In It to Win It is the eighth studio album by American rock band Saliva. It is the first album to feature singer Bobby Amaru, after Josey Scott left the band in 2012 and is their last to feature bassist Dave Novotny. The album was temporarily released via Rum Bum Records on September 3, 2013. The album is no longer available for purchase as the band re-released the album in 2014 as Rise Up. The re-release features all of the original album's songs except for "Animal", "Flesh", and "I.D.N.A.E". It is also their only studio album on Rum Bum Records.

== Track listing ==
No.	Title	Length
1.	"Animal"	2:53
2.	"She Can Sure Hide Crazy"	2:59
3.	"In It to Win It"	3:59
4.	"Choke"	3:30
5.	"Redneck Freakshow"	3:10
6.	"Lost"	3:45
7.	"1000 Eyes"	3:32
8.	"Flesh"	3:18
9.	"The Enemy"	2:56
10.	"Rise Up"	3:08
11.	"I Don't Want It"	3:31
12.	"I.D.N.A.E."	3:23
13.	"No One but Me"	4:53
14.	"Army (Bonus Track)"	3:08
15.	"Closer (Bonus Track)"	3:22
Total length:		51:27

Notes

- "I.D.N.A.E." is an acronym for "I Don't Need Another Enemy".

== Personnel ==
- Bobby Amaru – lead vocals
- Wayne Swinny – guitars, backing vocals
- Dave Novotny – bass, backing vocals
- Paul Crosby – drums
