= Deqadi =

- Municipality
- Location within Azerbaijan
- Coordinates: 38°31′N 48°47′E
- Country: Azerbaijan
- Rayon: Astara

Population
  - Total: 722
- Time zone: UTC+4 (AZT)
  - Summer (DST): UTC+5 (AZT)

Deqadi (also, Degady and Digadi) is a village and municipality in the Astara Rayon of Azerbaijan. It has a population of 722. The municipality consists of the villages of Deqadi and Səliva.
