= Badass (Saliva song) =

Single by Saliva

from the album Under Your Skin
- Released: March 8, 2011
- Genre: Nu metal
- Length: 3:05
- Label: Island Records
- Songwriters: Howard Benson, Paul Crosby, Bobby Huff, David A Novotny, Joseph Sappington, Wayne Swinny
- Producer: Howard Benson

Saliva singles chronology
| "Nothing" (2011) | "Badass" (2011) | "Hate Me" (2011) |

Music video
- "Badass" on YouTube

"Badass" is a song by the American rock band Saliva, the second single from their seventh studio album Under Your Skin (2011). While the single was released to radio and digital download on March 8, 2011, the song was first introduced in the successful horror blockbuster Saw 3D (2010) and it was also featured in TV ads for the film Bullet to the Head.

"Badass" would become the most successful single from Under Your Skin, reaching #26 on the US Billboard Mainstream Rock Songs chart.

A music video was made for "Badass." It debuted online on April 12, 2011.

== Charts ==
| Chart (2011) | Peak position |
|---|---|
| Billboard Mainstream Rock Tracks | 26 |
