= Small Town Dead =

Studio album by Bleeker Ridge
- Released: September 21, 2010
- Genres: Alternative rock; hard rock
- Length: 42:03; 51:29 (Special Edition)
- Label: Roadrunner
- Producer: Bob Marlette

Bleeker Ridge chronology
Small Town Dead (2010)	Four (2013)

Singles from Small Town Dead
- 1. "Small Town Dead" Released: August 2010; 2. "Sick Of You" Released: January 2, 2011; 3. "You Would've Liked It" Released: March 15, 2011

Small Town Dead is the third studio album by hard rock group Bleeker Ridge. It is their first to be released under a record label, and their only release with Roadrunner Records.

Bruce Moore of V13 Media described the album as "12 tracks of top notch hard rock music." He added: "Bleeker Ridge combines skilled musicianship with a brilliant production, upbeat rock n’ roll tracks and good songwriting; the result is a series of well-crafted hard rock tunes."

== Track listing ==
All tracks are written by Bleeker Ridge.

Standard Disc edition
No.	Title	Length
1.	"Pick Me Up"	3:02
2.	"Small Town Dead"	3:14
3.	"You Would've Liked It"	4:08
4.	"From Now On"	3:29
5.	"Easier Today"	2:59
6.	"Not the Only One"	3:21
7.	"In Our Hands"	3:35
8.	"Sick Of You"	4:07
9.	"Still Standing"	3:50
10.	"Sixteen Hours"	3:18
11.	"Bitter Soul"	3:27
12.	"Brother"	3:33
Total length:		42:03

Special Edition
No.	Title	Length
13.	"Glorious"	2:59
14.	"Uppercut"	3:37
15.	"What It Is"	2:50
Total length:		51:29
