= Smashing Satellites =

Canadian rock band

- Origin: Toronto, Ontario, Canada
- Genres: Alternative rock, post-grunge, hard rock, pop
- Years active: 2014–2017
- Label: Aluzion Records
- Members: Salvatore Costa; Devon Lougheed; Mick Valentyne; Mykey Thomas
- Website: smashingsatellites.com//

Smashing Satellites
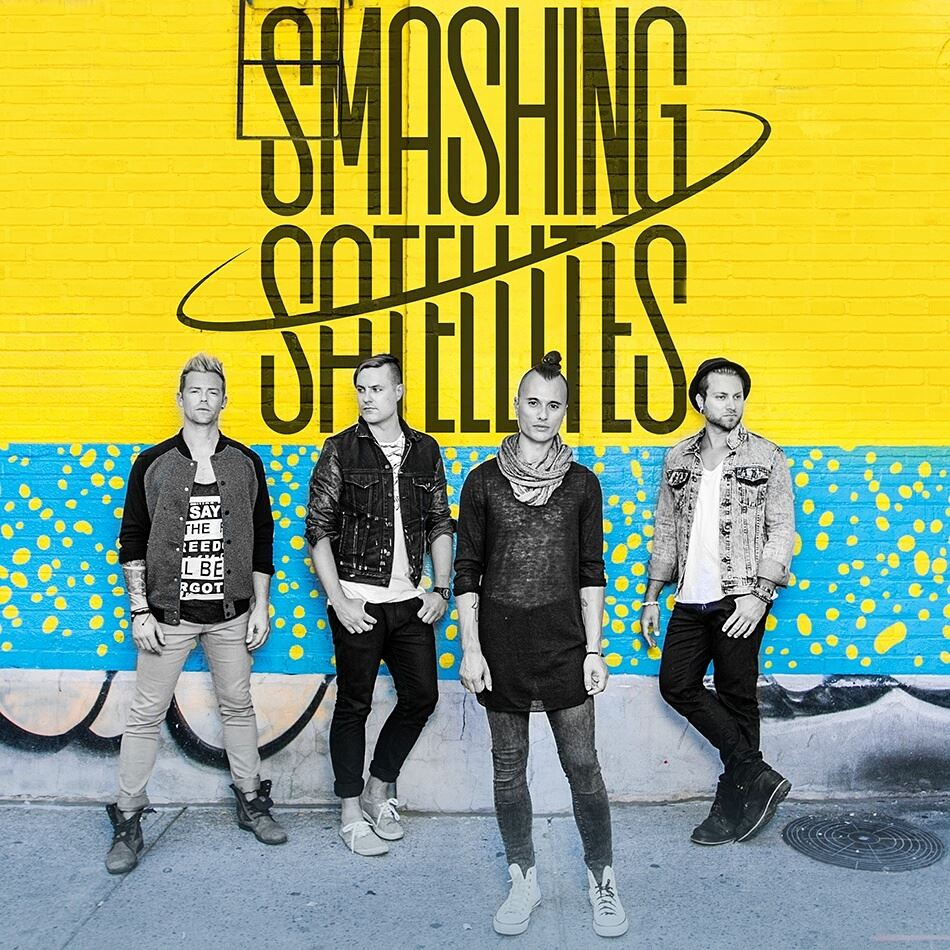
- Smashing Satellites members in an August 2015 promo

Background information
- Origin: Toronto, Ontario, Canada
- Genres: alternative rock, post-grunge, hard rock, pop
- Years active: 2014–2017
- Label: Aluzion Records
- Members: Salvatore Costa; Devon Lougheed; Mick Valentyne; Mykey Thomas
- Website: smashingsatellites.com

Smashing Satellites was a Canadian rock band formed in Toronto, Ontario, Canada by former My Darkest Days guitarist Sal Costa.

== History ==
After releasing two successful albums and selling out arenas with My Darkest Days, Sal Costa decided it was time to go full force and start his own band. On January 4, 2013, My Darkest Days announced Costa's departure and quickly Costa stated he would continue his musical career by forming his own band.

=== Formation ===
Throughout the rest of 2013 and the first half of 2014, Costa advertised the group by posting updates on his personal Facebook page. In the summer 2014 Costa changed the page name from his name "Sal Coz Costa" to "Smashing Satellites".

Costa traveled to Los Angeles with song ideas in his head, and went to work with producer and songwriter Bob Marlette, after spending a few months writing and recording music and experimenting with various different instruments such as live trumpet players, 40 different guitars and vintage keyboards and amplifiers Costa returned to Toronto where he recruited band members for a live band.

Costa recruited members Devon Lougheed, Mykey Thomas and Mick Valentyne to tour and become official members of Smashing Satellites.

=== SonicAluzion EP & Album 2014-2016 ===
After Costa successfully recruited band members to record and perform with him, the group traveled to Oklahoma to Hinder drummer, Cody Hanson's production studio "Back-Lounge Productions" to record and produce their debut EP and their debut album. Costa befriended Hanson while Costa's former band My Darkest Days toured with Hanson's group Hinder various times before Costa left the band.

On August 18, 2014 the band announced that their debut EP titled "SonicAluzion (A-Side)" will be released September 30, 2014 and that they will be releasing the debut single "Hounds" tomorrow August 19, 2014.

The group toured extensively throughout the Toronto area in support of the EP.

The band also released another single from "A-Side" titled "Waterfall" on February 12, 2015. The single debuted at No. 48 48 on the Billboard's Top 50 Alternative.

On April 14, 2015 Smashing Satellites announced the release of the first single from their debut album titled What It's All About and that their debut album SonicAluzion will be released June 16, 2015. The album will consist of the five songs from their debut EP "SonicAluzion (A-Side) 8 other new tracks.

Smashing Satellites released their debut album SonicAluzion on June 16, 2015, as planned. The album spawned the singles "Hounds", "Waterfall", "What It's All About", "Love Is Forever" and "Living Loud".

=== Gamblin' Man, White Elephant EP and retirement 2016-2017 ===
On January 8, 2016, Smashing Satellites released the single "Gamblin' Man". It debuted at number 38 on the Billboard Mainstream Rock chart in January 2016.

On May 26, 2017, the band released "Benny", the lead single for their next EP titled White Elephant.

On October 22, 2017, Costa announced his retirement from the music industry and the end of Smashing Satellites as the result; however, Costa stated that he will still release the upcoming White Elephant EP as a gift for fans.

== Band members ==
- Mick Valentyne – lead guitar, keyboards, songwriter
- Mykey Thomas – drummer, songwriter
- Devon Lougheed – rhythm guitar, keyboardist, songwriter

== Discography ==
EPs

- SonicAluzion (A-Side) (2014)
- White Elephant (2017)

Studio albums

- SonicAluzion (2015)

Non-album singles

- Gamblin' Man (2016) #39 Mainstream Rock Tracks
