= SpyHunter 2 =

2003 video game

- North American PlayStation 2 box art
- Developer: Angel Studios
- Publisher: Midway Games
- Series: Spy Hunter
- Platforms: PlayStation 2, Xbox
- Release: NA: November 24, 2003; EU: March 5, 2004
- Genre: Vehicular combat
- Modes: Single-player, multiplayer

SpyHunter 2 is a vehicular combat video game developed by Angel Studios and published by Midway in 2003 for the PlayStation 2 and Xbox. It is a sequel to the 2001 reboot of the 1983 game Spy Hunter.

The player's first mission begins in Russia, right where the last level left off from leaving Petra, Jordan and the NOSTRA organization completely decimated initializing a sequel from the 2001 remake; he begins his cooperation with Agent Duvelle, traveling in various locations all around the planet including Russia, the United States, Asia, Switzerland and Antarctica. The weapons van is brought back again and equipped this time with an automatic turret / machine gun being that the player can utilize in extreme vehicular combat resolutions. The newly acquired Interceptor SpyHunter vehicle can enter off-road mode and transform itself into a jet-ski, a snow-mobile, a motor-tricycle, and a speedboat. The player can also choose from an arsenal of weapons inspired by James Bond 007 and Mission Impossible. Available weapons include Mines, Smoke Screen, Oil Slick, Machine Guns, Rockets, Missiles, Lasers and Cannons. The soundtrack features the song "Dark Carnival" recorded by American singer-songwriter Vanessa Carlton.

== Theme song ==
The theme song of this game, "Dark Carnival" by American singer-songwriter Vanessa Carlton, is a reworked version of "Carnival", a track on her unreleased debut studio album, Rinse. Carlton said the song is "kind of electronica-esque by design", adding that she had always wanted to write about espionage. It introduced an entire new sound for Carlton that was much darker than her previous work. MTV News described the song, which is about a mysterious femme fatale, as "[an] edgy and brooding ballad" that "gets even more eerie when a sparse, plinky bridge reminiscent of the Halloween theme arises".

The lyrics of "Carnival" and "Dark Carnival" are different; for example, "Don't you run from the show, / 'Cause I just want you to know that I love anyway, / And I will not let you go" was altered to "When you get your bloody dose / In the still of the night / It is there you'll feel it most / In this dark carnival / Where the end is close". "Dark Carnival" was not included on Carlton's second album, Harmonium (2004). The character Agent Vanessa Duvelle, Alec's partner, was based on her.

== Plot ==
Alec Sects tries to deal with the remains of Nostra. First, he tries to familiarize himself with the new G-8155 Interceptor and later goes on a reconnaissance mission. Alec then learns about a defector in the Russian Nostra branch, Vladimir Polvac, who was a very influential figure, and has information about the Russian Nostra leader, "The Cossack". He needed an escort to an embassy, a transport to an airport, and needed Alec to ensure his plane took off unharmed (As he was trying to leave the country because of his defection). An informant later on revealed large sums of money being diverted to the restoration and fortification of an old nuclear power facility. Alec and fellow agent Vanessa Duvelle investigate the plant and Alec finds unique compact energy cells. After this, The Cossack's identity is revealed as Vladimir Impalakov, who then tries to leave his estate to a warehouse complex on the Baltic coast, using a massive and heavily armed experimental ekranoplan, but is killed by Alec before he could escape.

Alec then travels to New Orleans to meet Senator and televangelist Noah Thurgood. However, "Mad Mojo" Carter, a regional crime lord and leader of the American Nostra faction, sends an agent in a stolen G-8155 Interceptor prototype to kill Thurgood. The agent succeeds and the rendezvous is compromised. Alec follows Thurgood's killer and attempts to take him alive to be interrogated but aborts the mission and the rogue Interceptor escapes on a VTOL. Alec is needed elsewhere because an IES steamboat is holding a meeting about the strange Russian energy cells and needs protection. Alec then learns that Mad Mojo Carter's real name is Calvin Blackwell Jr., son of deceased industrialist Calvin Blackwell Sr., is an MIT graduate with honors in engineering, and that he stole top secret information from Thurgood before eliminating him. Alec tracks him down to a bayou, which he was using to cover his escape route. Blackwell was using a cargo jet to escape and had many guards protecting the runway, but Alec shoots the engines to prevent immediate takeoff and destroys the jet, Blackwell, and the top secret information he stole (since Alec could not recover it).

Alec proceeds to Asia via cargo ship. He then protects it from attack and reaches an IES Safehouse. Alec, along the way, destroys contraband cargo trucks and Phoenix forces working for the Krait Fang criminal organization (Asian faction of Nostra). Alec then learns his partner, Agent Vanessa Duvelle, has been kidnapped by the head of the Krait Fang, Nguyen McGinty and is being held for execution. Alec breaks her out, and later, destroys most of his forces, allowing a planned assault by special IES forces. This allows Alec to infiltrate the Krait Fang Fortress. He then learns McGinty is attempting to escape on a heavily armed train powered by one of the strange Russian energy cells and wants to destroy a city with a dirty bomb he has on his train. Alec destroys the train and kills McGinty.

They then move to the Alps, where Alec finds a rogue Interceptor prototype, similar to the one from New Orleans. The rogue Inteceptor prototype was stolen by Leland Chevre, the leader of the La Rouge Crime Syndicate (Swiss Nostra). Alec finds Chevre and kills him for the data in his vehicle. Alec analyzes the data from Chevre's vehicle and learns that three European Union facilities have been targeted for nuclear attack. Alec finds and destroys the Mobile Missile Platforms. Alec then heads to a castle owned by the Ararat Society with Agent Duvelle based on information from the stolen car. Alec then discovers that Thurgood is alive, and the leader.

Thurgood escapes to the Antarctic, where he has created a Mobile Research Facility that is also an "Ark" and Mobile "City" and plans to flood the world by using the unique compact energy cells to melt the Polar Ice Cap. With Impalakov, Blackwell, McGinty, and Chevre gone, he goes ahead with the plans so he and select others rule what's left. Alec destroys the ark, and he and Agent Duvelle are ordered to their next mission in Los Angeles.

== Reception ==
Reception

Aggregate score
Aggregator	Score	
Aggregator	PS2	Xbox
Metacritic	57/100	57/100

Review scores
Publication	Score	
Publication	PS2	Xbox
Electronic Gaming Monthly	5/10	5/10
Game Informer	6/10	6/10
GamePro	3.5/5	N/A
GameRevolution	D	D
GameSpot	5.8/10	6/10
GameSpy	3/5	3/5
GameZone	6.7/10	7/10
IGN	7/10	7/10
Official U.S. PlayStation Magazine	3/5	N/A
Official Xbox Magazine (US)	N/A	6/10

The game received "mixed" reviews on both platforms according to the review aggregation website Metacritic.
