= Saliva (album) =

Studio album by Saliva
- Released: August 26, 1997
- Studio: Rockingchair Recording (Memphis, Tennessee)
- Genres: Nu metal; alternative metal
- Length: 54:46
- Label: Rockingchair
- Producers: Bill Pappas; Mark Yoshida; Saliva

Saliva chronology
Saliva (1997)	Every Six Seconds (2001)

2003 re-release cover
- 2003 re-release cover

Professional ratings
Review scores
Source	Rating
AllMusic	3/5 stars

Saliva is the debut studio album by American rock band Saliva. Recorded at Rockingchair Recording Studios in Memphis, Tennessee, it was released on August 26, 1997, by Rockingchair Records. It is their only album to feature original drummer Todd Poole, who would leave in 1999 and was replaced by Paul Crosby.

== Re-issue (2003) ==
Following the major record label success of the band, after the release of Every Six Seconds (2001) and Back Into Your System (2002), Rockingchair Records made a manufacturing and distribution deal with Diamond Productions and RED Distribution imprint RUMM (RED Urban Music Marketing). The re-issue came out in 2003 with identical audio content but featured updated artwork. The front cover was completely redesigned and features a woman's face with her eyes closed, playing off the artwork of Every Six Seconds. The CD face was also altered from an all-black background on the original to a crackled texture on the re-issue. The booklet and back cover remained mostly identical with few exceptions; a different font was used for the text, the alignment was improved, the contact information was changed and there is a slight color shade difference: while the original issue had a more blue-ish gray tone, the re-issue has a more green-ish gray tone. The re-issue version's artwork was also designed and updated by Brandon Seavers, who had by this time bought out the multi-media company Audio MasterWorks with Mark Yoshida and renamed it AudioGraphic MasterWorks.

== Appearances ==
Four songs originally recorded for Saliva were later re-recorded with producer Bob Marlette and mixed by John Goodmanson and Steve Thompson as part of the band's major record label Island Records debut Every Six Seconds (2001). The four songs were "Beg", "Greater Than Less Than", "Pin Cushion" and "800". "Beg" and "Greater Than Less Than" appeared on Every Six Seconds, however "Pin Cushion" and "800" were cut from the album and kept as b-sides.

When Saliva released its greatest hits compilation album Moving Forward in Reverse: Greatest Hits in 2010, Saliva was the only release not to be showcased.

== Track listing ==
No.	Title	Length
1.	"Beg"	3:35
2.	"Sink"	4:00
3.	"Call It Something"	4:12
4.	"Spitshine"	3:01
5.	"Greater Than Less Than"	3:46
6.	"Cellophane"	3:52
7.	"Tongue"	4:20
8.	"Pin Cushion"	4:49
9.	"Sand Castle"	5:08
10.	"Groovy"	4:05
11.	"I Want It"	3:19
12.	"Suffocate"	4:50
13.	"800"	5:49
Total length:		54:46

== Personnel ==
Credits are adapted from the album's liner notes.

Saliva

- Josey Scott – vocals
- Todd Poole – drums, vocals
- Wayne Swinny – guitar
- Chris D'Abaldo – guitar
- Dave Novotny – bass

Artwork

- Brandon Seavers – art direction, layout, design
- Steve Roberts – photography

Production

- Bill Pappas – production, mixing, engineering
- Saliva – production, engineering
- Mark Yoshida – executive producer
- Jeff Speight – mastering
