= Survival of the Sickest (album) =

Studio album by Saliva
- Released: August 17, 2004
- Recorded: 2003–2004
- Studios: 747 Studios (Memphis, Tennessee); Long View Farms Studios (North Brookfield, Massachusetts)
- Genre: Hard rock
- Length: 51:03
- Label: Island
- Producer: Paul Ebersold

Saliva chronology
Back into Your System (2002)	Survival of the Sickest (2004)	Blood Stained Love Story (2007)

Singles from Survival of the Sickest
- 1. "Survival of the Sickest" Released: June 15, 2004; 2. "Razor's Edge" Released: November 9, 2004

Survival of the Sickest is the fourth studio album by the American rock band Saliva. It was released on August 17, 2004. The album produced two singles: "Survival of the Sickest" in June 2004, and "Razor's Edge" in November 2004. The title track was featured in the video games NASCAR 2005: Chase for the Cup and Backyard Wrestling 2: There Goes the Neighborhood, and was the official theme song for WWE's Unforgiven 2004 pay per view. It is their final album to feature original rhythm guitarist Chris D'Abaldo, who would leave the band in 2005.

The album represents the band shifting from their early nu metal and rap rock styles to focus more strongly on hard rock. Songs on the album show a variety of influences including southern rock, post-grunge, heavy metal, and rap rock.

== Background and development ==
In an interview with MTV, lead singer Josey Scott explained how he and the band changed their approach to crafting the album by cooling down on the girls and partying so they would be "well rested and well prepared" to record material that Scott made on his free time: "On our last tour, I personally got in the back of the tour bus with a little Wal-Mart tape recorder and just started beating these songs out. So when we went into the studio this time, I was prepared. I had 25 songs ready to go."

== Critical reception ==
Professional ratings
Aggregate scores
Source	Rating
Metacritic	(56/100)
Review scores
Source	Rating
AllMusic	2.5/5 stars
E! Online	B−
Entertainment Weekly	A−
Kerrang!	2/5 stars
Spin	C−
Sputnikmusic	1.5/5

According to the review aggregator Metacritic, Survival of the Sickest received "mixed or average reviews" based on a weighted average score of 56 out of 100 from 6 critic scores.

Entertainment Weekly writer Sean Richardson found the album going back to the band's early hard rock sound from their 1997 self-titled debut, praising Josey Scott for crafting tracks that pay tribute to 1980 hair metal and penning both "aching redemption songs and seething revenge tirades" that make it more contemporary. Johnny Loftus of AllMusic was mixed about the material throughout the record, criticizing the band's foray into "glowering, melodramatic plods ("No Regrets, Vol. 2", "Eyes Open")" and slumming with "massively compressed, hard-head rockers ("Carry On", "Fuck All Y'All")" but highlighted the title track, "Rock & Roll Revolution" and "Razor's Edge" for containing quality hard rock credentials with a Southern style, concluding with "That said, it's too bad the rest of Survival of the Sickest panders to unimaginative industry and genre posturing." Chuck Klosterman, writing for Spin, criticized Scott's musical craftsmanship on the album for giving the band a "crisis of confidence" when delivering his skewed vision of rock music, concluding that "Still, there's some Godsmackian guitar work on Survival of the Sickest, and the production has a Montana-esque vastness that will undoubtedly sound good on terrible radio stations across the U.S."

== Track listing ==
No.	Title	Writer(s)	Length
1.	"Rock & Roll Revolution"	Josey Scott; Wayne Swinny	4:39
2.	"Bait & Switch"	Scott; Swinny	3:34
3.	"One Night Only"	Scott	3:55
4.	"Survival of the Sickest"	Scott; Swinny	4:08
5.	"No Regrets (Volume 2)"	Scott; Swinny; Michael Baskette; Paul Crosby	5:02
6.	"Two Steps Back"	Scott; Swinny; Chris D'Abaldo	3:34
7.	"Open Eyes"	Scott; Swinny; Baskette	3:56
8.	"Fuck All Y'all"	Scott; Swinny; D'Abaldo	3:29
9.	"I Want You"	Scott; Swinny	3:41
10.	"Carry On"	Scott; D'Abaldo; Dave Novotny	3:30
11.	"Razor's Edge" (featuring Brad Arnold)	Scott; Swinny; Novotny	3:22
12.	"No Hard Feelings"	Scott; Swinny; Baskette; Crosby	3:56
13.	"Sex, Drugs & Rock 'n' Roll [Hidden Track]"	Scott; Paul Ebersold	4:17
Total length:			51:05

== Chart positions ==
Album

Chart (2004)	Peak position
US Billboard 200	20

Singles

Year	Single	Chart	Position
2004	"Survival of the Sickest"	Mainstream Rock Tracks	6
2004	"Survival of the Sickest"	Modern Rock Tracks	22
2004	"Razor's Edge"	Mainstream Rock Tracks	17

== Credits ==
Credits adapted from album's liner notes.

Saliva

- Josey Scott - lead vocals, acoustic guitar, percussion
- Wayne Swinny - lead guitar, backing vocals
- Chris D'Abaldo - rhythm guitar, backing vocals
- Dave Novotny - bass, backing vocals
- Paul Crosby - drums

Additional personnel

- Paul Ebersold – producer, strings, keyboards, drum programming
- Matt Martone — engineer
- Skidd Mills — mixing (tracks 1–3, 5–10, 12–14)
- Andy Wallace — mixing (tracks 4, 11)
- Howie Weinberg — mastering
