= Bleeker (band) =

Canadian rock band

- Also known as: Bleeker Ridge
- Origin: Orillia, Ontario, Canada
- Genres: Alternative rock; blues rock; grunge; garage rock; hard rock
- Years active: 2003-present
- Labels: Five Seven, Roadrunner Records, Black Rose Communications, Known Accomplice
- Members: Taylor Perkins; Cole Perkins; Mike Vandyk; Chris Dimas; Tim Kehoe
- Past members: Dustin Steinke; Dan Steinke
- Website: www.bleeker-official.com

Bleeker are a Canadian rock band from Orillia, Ontario, consisting of brothers Taylor Perkins, Cole Perkins, as well as Mike Vandyk, Tim Kehoe and Chris Dimas.

== History ==
Originally Bleeker Ridge, the band was formed by two sets of brothers: Taylor and Cole Perkins, and Dan and Dustin Steinke. They came together in 2003 when all four met at a music shop in Orillia, Ontario, when Perkins and Steinke were 12 years old. They first started playing covers of Jimi Hendrix and Joe Walsh songs before releasing their first two CDs, titled Undertow (2004) and The Rain (2007). The band was scouted by various members of the music industry, but were often considered too young. Joe Kresta, an A&R director, saw the band in 2005 when he was with Universal Music Canada. Kresta said he was:

totally amazed at what these 14-year-olds were doing, they had their shirts off, long hair and it was almost odd, these voices and that sound coming out of these little guys. There were guitar licks that you see guys three times their age doing, but I wasn't in A&R at the time, so I walked away thinking, "Hey, that was really something special," but they still hadn't found their own identity.

The band's name Bleeker Ridge is from the street names where the two sets of brothers lived: the Perkins' lived on Bleeker St. and the Steinke's lived on Ridge Ave.

The band later signed with Roadrunner Records. In the Summer of 2010, the band toured Canada with Airbourne as one of two opening acts, along with Social Code. They released the album Small Town Dead, produced by Bob Marlette, on September 21, 2010 in Canada. The first single from the album was the title track "Small Town Dead". The song charted on the Canadian Active Rock Charts, reaching the top 10. In Spring 2011, Bleeker Ridge performed on the Canadian leg of the Jagermiester Music tour alongside My Darkest Days, Papa Roach, and Buckcherry.

They also released "You Would've Liked It" and "Sick of You" as singles in 2011.

Mike Vandyk, "Dutch", joined the band shortly after the album's release. Mike had been a session/recording & tour bassist for the band.

In April 2013, Bleeker Ridge released "Last Cigarette" as a single from their soon to be released album Four, followed by "Go Home" a few months later. June 4, 2013, Bleeker Ridge's album Four was released.

After completing the recording of their new album with James Michael, who along with Nikki Sixx and DJ Ashba form the band Sixx:A.M., Dustin was asked to play drums for them on their Japanese debut at the Nippon Budokan on February 19, 2015 as part of VampPark Fest hosted by the rock band Vamps. After a successful show in Japan, they asked him to play drums on their first tour, the Modern Vintage Tour.

In January 2016, Dustin left the band and signed on with Sixx:A.M., and Bleeker Ridge changed their name to Bleeker. Dan left the band a few months later.

In 2017, Bleeker was nominated for Breakthrough Group of the Year at the Juno Awards.

In 2023, Bleeker signed a management deal with Known Accomplice and have hinted that new music is coming towards the end of 2023.

Songs from the band's 2024 album Messed Up started to release as singles in 2024.

Prior to the start of the 2024 NHL playoffs, the band signed a deal with the league who would use the single "Let's Go" throughout the NHL playoff broadcasts. As a result, "Let's Go" was feature multiple times a game in a majority of the games throughout the entire playoffs. "Let's Go" was also used as the opening montage in several games.

"Let's Go" was featured in the 2024 European Championships, most notably as the opening and introduction to team England on the European broadcast.

On June 28, 2024, the band released the album Messed Up. The album was produced by Brian Moncarz and the band's own Chris Dimas, who, in addition to his role as the album's producer, took full responsibility to mix the record.

On October 4, 2024 it was officially announced by EA Games that the song "Let's Go" was selected as part of the official soundtrack for the popular EA Sports franchise NHL 25.

== Band members ==
Current members

- Taylor Perkins — lead vocals (2003–present)
- Cole Perkins — lead guitar, backing vocals (2003–present)
- Mike Vandyk — bass guitar (2003–present)
- Chris Dimas — drums, producer (2016–present)
- Tim Kehoe — guitar _{(2016-present)}

Past members

- Dustin Steinke – drums, backing vocals (2003–2016)
- Dan Steinke – guitar, backing vocals (2003–2016)

== Discography ==
=== Studio albums ===
| Title | Album details |
|---|---|
| Undertow (as Bleeker Ridge) | Released: 2004; Label: Self-released |
| The Rain (as Bleeker Ridge) | Released: 2007; Label: Self-released |
| Small Town Dead (as Bleeker Ridge) | Released: September 28, 2010; Label: Roadrunner |
| Four (as Bleeker Ridge) | Released: June 4, 2013; Label: Black Rose Communications |
| Erase You | Released: October 21, 2016; Label: Five Seven |
| Messed Up | Released: June 28, 2024; Label: Bleeker |
| Elephant | Released: September 04, 2026; Label: Known Accomplice |

== Extended plays ==
List of extended plays
| Title | EP details |
|---|---|
| F**k You I'm Leaving | Released: June 20, 2025; Label: Bleeker |

=== Singles ===
| Title | Year | Peak chart positions | | | | Album |
| Title | Year | CAN Rock | US Alt. | US Main. | US Rock Air. | Album |
|---|---|---|---|---|---|---|
| "Small Town Dead" | 2010 | — | — | — | — | Small Town Dead |
| "Last Cigarette" | 2013 | — | — | — | — | Four |
| "Highway" | 2016 | 4 | 31 | 11 | 31 | Erase You |
| "Where's Your Money" | 2017 | 30 | — | — | — | Erase You |
| "James Dean" | 2018 | — | — | — | — | Non-album single |
| "Straight for the Money" | 2019 | — | — | — | — | Self-Made |
| "Running Through the Flames" | 2019 | — | — | — | — | Self-Made |
| "Give a Little Bit More (Disaster)" | 2020 | — | 34 | — | — | Self-Made |
| "Problems" | 2020 | — | — | — | — | Self-Made |
| "No Rain" | 2020 | — | — | — | — | Non-album single |
| "Silent Night" | — | — | — | — | — | Non-album single |
| "Walken" | — | — | — | — | — | Messed Up |
"—" denotes a single that did not chart or was not released in that territory.

=== Music Videos ===
| Year | Song | Director |
|---|---|---|
| 2010 | "Small Town Dead" | |
| 2011 | "Sick of You" | Cody Calahan |
| 2016 | "Highway" | Ben Guzman |
| 2017 | "Where's Your Money" | Frankie Nasso |
| 2019 | "Straight for the Money" | Stefano Bertelli |
| 2020 | "Disaster" | |
| 2020 | "Problems" | Brendan Barnard |
| 2024 | "Let's Go" | Jeff Nedza |
| 2025 | "Hey Man" | Jeff Nedza |
| 2026 | “Great Unknown” | Jeff Nedza |
| 2026 | “Elephant” | Jeff Nedza |
| 2026 | “Something On You” | Jeff Nedza |
| 2026 | “Laundry” | |

== Juno Awards ==
The Juno Awards are presented by the Canadian Academy of Recording Arts and Sciences. Bleeker has received one nomination.

| Year | Nominee / work | Award | Result |
|---|---|---|---|
| 2017 | Bleeker | Breakthrough Group of the Year | Nominated |

== See also ==
- Canadian rock
- Music of Canada
