= Your Disease =

2001 single by Saliva

Single by Saliva

from the album Every Six Seconds
- Released: February 13, 2001
- Recorded: 2000
- Genre: Nu metal
- Length: 4:00
- Label: Island
- Songwriters: Chris D'Abaldo; Wayne Swinny; Josey Scott; Todd Poole
- Producer: Bob Marlette

Saliva singles chronology
"800" (1997)	"Your Disease" (2001)	"Click Click Boom" (2001)

Music video
- "Your Disease" on YouTube

"Your Disease" is a song by American rock band Saliva. It was officially released in February 2001, as the lead single from their second studio album Every Six Seconds. The song was featured in the soundtrack for the film Dracula 2000 (2000), as well as the soundtracks of the video games SpyHunter (2001), Aggressive Inline (2002), and Downhill Domination (2003).

== Composition and lyrics ==
The song is about a "relationship gone wrong and how things can go bad real fast when there is manipulation and sex involved," former Saliva vocalist Josey Scott said. Scott also said, "People's emotions can get pretty tangled. I'd say a lot of our songs are relationship-oriented, and not just because everybody can identify with it, either. It's about being honest."

== Release ==
After Saliva completed their first effort for Island Records and turned in the finished album in July 2000, the label decided to hold the album initially and release it in early 2001. Before then, "Your Disease" was placed on the Dracula 2000 soundtrack, and began to gain airplay from radio stations in late 2000. The song was then officially serviced to radio in February 2001, being the first single from Every Six Seconds, the band's major label debut album.

== Charts ==
Chart (2001)	Peak position
US Bubbling Under Hot 100 (Billboard)	16
US Modern Rock Tracks (Billboard)	7
US Hot Mainstream Rock Tracks (Billboard)	3

== Release history ==
Region	Date	Format(s)	Label(s)	Ref.
United States	February 13, 2001	Mainstream rock; active rock; alternative radio	Island	
