= SonicAluzion =

Studio album by Smashing Satellites
- Released: June 16, 2015
- Recorded: 2014
- Genres: Hard rock, alternative rock, pop
- Label: Aluzion Records
- Producers: Cody Hanson, Marshal Dutton

Smashing Satellites chronology
SonicAluzion (A-Side) (2014)	SonicAluzion (2015)

Singles from SonicAluzion
- 1. "Hounds" Released: August 18, 2014; 2. "Waterfall" Released: February 12, 2015

SonicAluzion is the debut/only album by the Canadian rock group Smashing Satellites. The album was released June 16, 2015 through the band's own label Aluzion Records.

== Recording and release ==
Smashing Satellites recorded their debut EP and debut album at Cody Hanson from Hinders production studio "Back-Lounge Productions", the band released their debut EP "SonicAluzion (A-Side)" on September 30, 2014. The EP consisted of 5 tracks and included their debut single "Hounds" and hit single "Waterfall".

April 13, 2015 the band announced that their debut album would be titled "SonicAluzion" and that it will be released June 16, 2015. The album will feature 11 tracks, including the 5 tracks previously released on their debut EP and the other remaining tracks would be previously unheard. the album didn’t do well

== Track listing ==
SonicAluzion track listing
No.	Title	Length
1.	"Waterfall"	3:55
2.	"Like a Feather"	4:02
3.	"Calm Me Down"	4:34
4.	"Taste of Fame"	3:55
5.	"Hounds"	3:30
6.	"Living Loud"	4:09
7.	"This Is Paradise"	3:25
8.	"What It's All About"	3:27
9.	"Us"	3:48
10.	"Few & Far Between"	3:23
11.	"Love Is Forever"	4:23
12.	"Like a Feather" (Acoustic)	3:51
13.	"Good Times"	3:32
Total length:		49:31

== Personnel ==
Smashing Satellites

- Salvatore Costa - lead vocals, rhythm guitar
- Mick Valentyne - keyboards, rhythm guitar
- Mykey Thomas - drums, backing vocals
- Devon Lougheed - bass, backing vocals
