= SpyHunter =

2001 video game

- North American PlayStation 2 box art
- Developers: Paradigm Entertainment (Note: Ported to GameCube and Xbox by Point of View, to Windows by Fluent Entertainment, and to Mac OS X by TransGaming.); Midway Games (GBA); Vasara Games (Zodiac) (Note: Internal game development division of Fathammer.)
- Publishers: Midway; Aspyr (PC, Mac OS X)
- Designer: Shawn Wright
- Series: Spy Hunter
- Platforms: PlayStation 2, GameCube, Xbox, Game Boy Advance, Windows, Mac OS X, Zodiac
- Release: September 25, 2001: PlayStation 2; NA: September 25, 2001; EU: October 19, 2001 GameCube, Xbox; NA: March 12, 2002; EU: June 28, 2002 Game Boy Advance; NA: May 13, 2002; EU: November 18, 2002 Windows & Mac OS X; NA: May 26, 2003 Zodiac; NA: November 4, 2003; EU: October 22, 2004
- Genre: Vehicular combat
- Modes: Single-player, multiplayer

SpyHunter is a vehicular combat game released for the PlayStation 2 in 2001. It is a reboot and sequel of the 1983 arcade game of the same name. It was later ported to GameCube, Xbox, Game Boy Advance, Windows, Mac OS X, and Tapwave Zodiac. In the game, the player drives the G-6155 Interceptor, an advanced, weaponized spy vehicle. Unlike the original's top-down view, the remake is played with a chase camera, similar to a racing game. The PlayStation 2 version received positive reviews while reception for the ports was mixed. A sequel, SpyHunter 2, was released in 2003.

== Overview ==
The game features variations of the Peter Gunn theme throughout the game, including menu screens and the main levels, as well as a variation with lyrics called "The Spy Hunter Theme" by Saliva. Each mission, of which there are fourteen (including 2 training levels), has one primary objective and a number of secondary objectives. There is a range of objectives, though the gameplay is similar on every level: the player must drive along shooting enemy vehicles, avoiding civilians and destroying set targets. Every mission must be completed within a time limit. Objectives are generally to destroy things like enemy weapons, equipment and communications towers, to avoid civilian casualties, to tag things with tracking devices and so on, although some objectives that are a little different include escaping from a warehouse using a trabant within a tight time limit, escorting and protecting allied vehicles and even chasing and destroying a stolen Interceptor vehicle.

The car features the same weapons as the original arcade game, although only the machine guns, and oil slick are available at first; the smoke screen and missiles are acquired later (in this game, there are two types of missiles: unguided rockets and guided missiles). New weapons include tracking devices (not really a weapon) and a flamethrower, rail gun, EMP launcher, IR scanner. Larger 20mm guns, then 40mm guns are unlocked as well. The weapons van also returns in this game, and features some of the same enemies (including "Switch Blade" Plymouth Prowler which has tire slashers, and the "Road Lord" Mack Superliner which can't be destroyed with machine guns). The Interceptor has three modes: car, boat and motorcycle (the third mode is new to this game), the latter mode appearing when the Interceptor's energy (in car or boat mode) is critically low. The game also features a two-player mode, where the player and a friend can race through any of the 14 missions after completing them in single player mode. Some are straight races, while others require the players to kill chickens or drive through icons along the way. The players can also destroy each other, after which they "respawn".

== Plot ==
The plot deals with Alec Sects, an F-15 pilot who was trained by the FBI, as he tries to take down Nostra, an Israeli-based international company that produces food products, bio-chemicals, genetics, e-commerce and children's software. Daemon Curry, a man who believes himself to be the figure mentioned in several religions (for example: the second christ/antichrist and believes in the prophecies of Nostradamus), is the founder and leader. To deal with him, the IES create a team called Spyhunter. Curry has reason to believe that it is the same person who stopped him in 1983 (Spy Hunter).

When he was trying to launch his plan, he sends all he has after him. Curry's plan is to use four EMP weapons mounted on satellites, dubbed the Four Horsemen, to stop all electricity in the world, then plans to rule. Originally Alec does light missions, mostly destruction of Nostra property (like a vehicle created from Nostra and stolen IES technology), but Nostra hijacks the "Weapons Van" and an Interceptor, and Alec is forced to destroy it. Eventually, the G-6155 Interceptor receives an upgrade (and a change of paint) to the G-6155 Interceptor II, complete with an EMP Launcher, Scanner, and a shorter Turbo lag time. Nostra's schemes become more dangerous, and Alec finds himself returning to most of the previous Nostra bases for more intense missions such as destroying weapons of mass destruction.

Later, he finds the headquarters where the Four Horsemen are based in Petra. After a hard-fought battle, the Four Horsemen are defused and explode, while Alec escapes on the Interceptor II. Following a parachute dive from the cliff-side base and landing safely on the ground, he heads toward Russia, setting the stage for SpyHunter 2. Curry's fate is never shown, but he is most likely killed in the explosion as he is not mentioned among the Nostra ringleaders in the sequel.

== Development ==
Word that the game was in development emerged in late 1997. At the time, it was titled "Spy Hunter Returns", was planned for release in late 1998 or early 1999, and had the Nintendo 64 as its target platform, but Midway already had plans to feature different versions of the original Peter Gunn theme throughout the game.

== Reception ==
Reception

Aggregate score
| Aggregator | Score | | | | |
| Aggregator | GBA | GameCube | PC | PS2 | Xbox |
|---|---|---|---|---|---|
| Metacritic | 64/100 | 71/100 | 56/100 | 84/100 | 71/100 |

Review scores
| Publication | Score | | | | |
| Publication | GBA | GameCube | PC | PS2 | Xbox |
|---|---|---|---|---|---|
| AllGame | 3.5/5 | N/A | N/A | 3.5/5 | N/A |
| Edge | N/A | N/A | N/A | 6/10 | N/A |
| Electronic Gaming Monthly | N/A | N/A | N/A | 8.17/10 | 8/10 |
| Game Informer | 7.5/10 | 7.5/10 | N/A | 8.5/10 | 7.75/10 |
| GamePro | 3/5 | 4.5/5 | N/A | 4/5 | 4/5 |
| GameRevolution | N/A | N/A | N/A | B | N/A |
| GameSpot | 6.2/10 | 6.7/10 | 5.8/10 | 7.8/10 | 6.7/10 |
| GameSpy | 76% | 70% | 2/5 | 88% | 79% |
| GameZone | 7.2/10 | 7.8/10 | 7.6/10 | 8.3/10 | 6.3/10 |
| IGN | 7.2/10 | 6.8/10 | N/A | 8.9/10 | 7/10 |
| Next Generation | N/A | N/A | N/A | 4/5 | N/A |
| Nintendo Power | 3.2/5 | 2.9/5 | N/A | N/A | N/A |
| Official U.S. PlayStation Magazine | N/A | N/A | N/A | 4.5/5 | N/A |
| Official Xbox Magazine (US) | N/A | N/A | N/A | N/A | 8.1/10 |
| PC Gamer (US) | N/A | N/A | 51% | N/A | N/A |
| Maxim | N/A | N/A | N/A | 8/10 | N/A |

The game sold a million copies by August 2003. By July 2006, the PlayStation 2 version of SpyHunter had sold 900,000 copies and earned $29 million in the United States. Next Generation ranked it as the 64th highest-selling game launched for the PlayStation 2, Xbox or GameCube between January 2000 and July 2006 in that country. Combined console sales of SpyHunter games released in the 2000s reached 1.6 million units in the United States by November 2003.

The PlayStation 2 version received "favorable" reviews, while the rest of the console versions received "mixed or average reviews", according to the review aggregation website Metacritic.

Jeff Lundrigan reviewed the PlayStation 2 version of the game for Next Generation, rating it four stars out of five, and stated that "It's a sheer blast, and a find update to a classic game, but it's still more a rental than a keeper."

In Japan, Famitsu gave the PS2 version a score of one nine, one six, and two eights for a total of 31 out of 40. GameSpot's Ryan Davis praised the same version as "a solid reinterpretation of a video game classic that adds its own unique elements to the franchise without forsaking what made Spy Hunter what it was." However, he later panned the PC port as "a very modest arcade driving game that's simply not worth playing [...] Graphics and the gameplay have been compromised too much in the transition. The end result is a game with shoddy controls that looks more dated than the source material." Avery Score of the same website gave the Zodiac version 8.8 out of 10, saying that it "falls short of perfection, but is one of the best games in recent memory and a blast to play alone or with friends." GameZone also gave the Zodiac version nine out of ten, saying that it was "not just a must-buy for those who have a Zodiac, it's also a reason to buy a Zodiac."
