= Back into Your System =

Studio album by Saliva
- Released: November 12, 2002
- Recorded: 2002
- Studio: Bearsville (Woodstock, New York)
- Genres: Alternative metal; nu metal; post-grunge
- Length: 48:43
- Labels: Island, Island Def Jam
- Producer: Bob Marlette

Saliva chronology
| Every Six Seconds (2001) | Back into Your System (2002) | Survival of the Sickest (2004) |

Singles from Back into Your System
- 1. "Always" Released: October 2002; 2. "Rest in Pieces" Released: February 25, 2003; 3. "Raise Up" Released: 2003

Back into Your System is the third studio album by American rock band Saliva. It reached number 19 on the Billboard 200 and was certified Gold by the Recording Industry Association of America (RIAA) since its release.

Back into Your System spawned its first single, "Always" in late 2002 and reached number 51 on the Billboard Hot 100 and number 1 on the Modern Rock Tracks chart. Its second single was "Rest In Pieces" making several Billboard charts in 2003 and later launching their third single "Raise Up", reaching number 29 on the Mainstream Rock chart.

== Release ==
"Rest In Pieces" is a promotional single for Back into Your System, written by James Michael and Nikki Sixx, both of Sixx: A.M. The music video for "Rest In Pieces" shows the band as they are touring.

"Raise Up" was released in 2003 as the third single off their third studio album Back Into Your System (2002). It reached number 29 on the Billboard Mainstream Rock chart.

== Promotion ==
On January 3, 2003, the band announced a 32-city nationwide tour to promote the album, beginning in Jackson, Mississippi's Hal & Mal's and finishing at the London Astoria. Breaking Benjamin and Greenwheel were supporting acts during the U.S. dates and Stone Sour performed on the U.K. portion of the European tour.

== Critical reception ==
Professional ratings
Review scores
| Source | Rating |
|---|---|
| AllMusic | 4/5 stars |
| Blender | 2/5 stars |
| Entertainment Weekly | B− |
| Melodic | 4/5 stars |
| Sputnikmusic | 3/5 |

Back into Your System received positive reviews from music critics. Brian O'Neill of AllMusic praised the band for making the album more focused in its overall sound and musicianship than Every Six Seconds, concluding that "[The] best thing about Back Into Your System is that the disc doesn't seem to pander to rock radio as much as others of its ilk, but it should still (and did) manage success there regardless." Kaj Roth of Melodic also praised the band's commitment to delving deep into crafting solid musicianship while still retaining a semblance of their given genre. Jon Caramanica, writing for Entertainment Weekly, was mixed on Josey Scott's vocal style but gave note that his band's "unsubtle wall of monster metal ensures they never stray too far from bombast." Ben Mitchell of Blender called it "an album written by headbangers kicking it back a few notches to get some of that sweet post-grunge platinum". Bob Waliszewski of Plugged In (publication) felt the band delivered mixed messages of positivity and hedonism throughout the album's track list, concluding that "With frothing guitars and drooling drums, the guys in Saliva spit out obscenities, spiritual confusion and a smug addiction to celebrity excess. A few good spots, but the parental advisory label is well-deserved."

== Track listing ==
| No. | Title | Writer(s) | Length |
|---|---|---|---|
| 1. | "Superstar II" | Josey Scott, Chris D'Abaldo | 3:21 |
| 2. | "Weight of the World" | Scott, Bob Marlette | 4:28 |
| 3. | "Always" | Scott, Marlette | 3:51 |
| 4. | "Back into Your System" | Scott, D'Abaldo, Wayne Swinny, Dave Novotny, Paul Crosby | 4:31 |
| 5. | "All Because of You" | Scott, D'Abaldo, Novotny | 4:42 |
| 6. | "Raise Up" | Scott, D'Abaldo | 3:45 |
| 7. | "Separated Self" | Scott, D'Abaldo, Marlette | 4:01 |
| 8. | "Rest in Pieces" | Nikki Sixx, James Michael | 3:46 |
| 9. | "Storm" | Scott, Marlette | 4:21 |
| 10. | "Holdin On" | Scott, Swinny | 4:21 |
| 11. | "Pride" | Scott, D'Abaldo, Swinny | 2:53 |
| 12. | "Famous Monsters" | Scott | 4:43 |
| Total length: | | | 48:43 |

Special edition bonus track
| No. | Title | Writer(s) | Length |
|---|---|---|---|
| 13. | "Click Click Boom" | Scott, D'Abaldo, Swinny, Marlette | 4:11 |

Bonus videos (UK special edition)
| No. | Title | Writer(s) | Length |
|---|---|---|---|
| 13. | "Your Disease" (music video) | Scott, D'Abaldo, Swinny, Todd Poole |
| 14. | "Click Click Boom" (music video) | Scott, D'Abaldo, Swinny, Marlette |

Enhanced CD also features a playable demo of the PC game Warcraft III: Reign of Chaos.

== Credits ==
Credits adapted from album's liner notes.

Saliva

- Josey Scott – lead vocals, acoustic guitar, percussion
- Wayne Swinny – lead guitar, backing vocals
- Chris D'Abaldo – rhythm guitar, backing vocals
- Dave Novotny – bass, backing vocals
- Paul Crosby – drums

Production

- Bob Marlette – producer
- Michael "Elvis" Baskette — engineer
- Dave Holdredge — programming
- Randy Staub — mixing (tracks 1–8, 10, 11)
- Cliff Norrell — mixing (tracks 9, 12)
- Stephen Marcussen — mastering

== Charts ==
=== Weekly charts ===
Weekly chart performance for Back into Your System
| Chart (2002–2003) | Peak position |
|---|---|
| Australian Albums (ARIA) | 86 |
| US Billboard 200 | 19 |

=== Year-end charts ===
Year-end chart performance for Back into Your System
| Chart (2003) | Position |
|---|---|
| US Billboard 200 | 159 |

== Certifications ==
Certifications for Back into Your System
| Region | Certification | Certified units/sales |
|---|---|---|
| United States (RIAA) | Gold | 500,000^{^} |
^{^} Shipments figures based on certification alone.
