= Every Six Seconds =

Studio album by Saliva
- Released: March 27, 2001
- Recorded: 1999–2000
- Studios: A&M (West Hollywood, California); The Blue Room (Woodland Hills, California)
- Genres: Nu metal; alternative metal; rap metal
- Length: 50:56
- Label: Island
- Producer: Bob Marlette

Saliva chronology
Saliva (1997)	Every Six Seconds (2001)	Back into Your System (2002)

Singles from Every Six Seconds
- 1. "Your Disease" Released: February 13, 2001; 2. "Click Click Boom" Released: August 7, 2001; 3. "After Me" Released: December 18, 2001

Every Six Seconds is the second studio album and major label debut by American rock band Saliva. It was released on March 27, 2001, through Island Records. The album contains the singles "Your Disease", "Click Click Boom", and "After Me". The track "Superstar" was used as the theme song for WrestleMania X8 pay-per-view event in 2002 and the band performed the song at the event. In July 2008, Every Six Seconds was certified platinum by the RIAA.

== Background ==
Josey Scott revealed the meaning of the album's title in an interview with Therese McKeon from the website Shoutweb:

Everything we do is for a reason and I felt like this was an opportunity to do what we wanted to do right down to the album cover and the album title. It was another opportunity to be creative and invoke thought. We thought the title "Every Six Seconds" said a lot about the world today and where our society is pretty much sitting. I got it from a news documentary I was watching that was talking about robbery and car theft and murder and other subjects. It finally got around to sex of course and they said that men think about sex every six seconds. I thought that was really interesting and it kind of stuck in my mind. I think it says it all for me and for the record. It's dealing with everything from the healing condition to anger and love and sex and spiritually and the disillusionment with society. I think the title is befitting.

The songs "Beg" and "Greater Than/Less Than" originally appeared on Saliva's 1997 self-titled debut album and were re-recorded for Every Six Seconds. "Your Disease", "Click Click Boom", and "After Me" were released as singles, and the former two both charted highly on several Billboard charts. Years after the album's release, the band's original drummer who appeared on the self-titled album, Todd Poole, was eventually given a co-writing credit for "Your Disease" and the two aforementioned re-recorded songs.

== Reception ==
Professional ratings
Review scores
Source	Rating
AllMusic	3/5 stars
Alternative Press	3/5 stars
Kerrang!	4/5 stars
Melodic.net	3.5/5 stars
Sputnikmusic	3.5/5

Alternative Press gave the album a rating of 3 out of 5, describing Saliva as having "a penchant for pretty, angst-ridden melodies for lonely boys and girls." CMJ said the album had "of-the-moment aggro, with an emphasis on rapcore moments interrupted by melodic, clean vocals.

== Track listing ==
No.	Title	Writer(s)	Length
1.	"Superstar"	Josey Scott	4:03
2.	"Musta Been Wrong"	Scott; Chris D'Abaldo; Wayne Swinny	3:33
3.	"Click Click Boom"	Scott; D'Abaldo; Swinny; Bob Marlette	4:12
4.	"Your Disease"	Scott; D'Abaldo; Swinny; Todd Poole	4:00
5.	"After Me"	Scott; D'Abaldo	3:52
6.	"Greater Than/Less Than"	Scott; Marlette; Poole	4:50
7.	"Lackluster"	Scott; Marlette	5:12
8.	"Faultline"	Scott; Dave Novotny	3:49
9.	"Beg"	Scott; Poole; Novotny	3:40
10.	"Hollywood"	Scott	3:50
11.	"Doperide"	Scott; D'Abaldo; Swinny	3:26
12.	"My Goodbyes"	Scott; Marlette	6:29
Total length:			50:56

== Personnel ==
Credits adapted from album's liner notes.

Saliva

- Josey Scott – vocals
- Wayne Swinny – lead guitar, mandolin, banjo, lapsteel
- Chris D'Abaldo – rhythm guitar
- Dave Novotny – bass
- Paul Crosby – drums, percussion

Production

- Bob Marlette – producer, engineer, mixing (tracks 1, 3, 7, 8, 12)
- John Goodmanson – mixing (tracks 2, 4–6, 9, 11)
- Steve Thompson – mixing (tracks 2, 4–6, 9, 11)
- Ron St. Germain – mixing (track 10)
- George Marino – mastering

== Charts ==
=== Weekly charts ===
Weekly chart performance for Every Six Seconds
Chart (2001)	Peak position
US Billboard 200	56

=== Year-end charts ===
Year-end chart performance for Every Six Seconds
Chart (2001)	Position
US Billboard 200	161

== Certifications ==
Certifications for Every Six Seconds
Region	Certification	Certified units/sales
United States (RIAA)	Platinum	1,000,000^{^}
^{^} Shipments figures based on certification alone.
