= Bob Marlette =

American record producer

- Born: Robert Roy Marlette; December 7, 1955 (age 70)
- Origin: Lincoln, Nebraska, U.S.
- Genres: Rock; pop; heavy metal
- Occupations: Record producer; recording engineer; songwriter; mixing engineer
- Instruments: Keyboards, guitar, bass

Robert Roy Marlette (born December 7, 1955) is an American record producer, recording engineer, mixer, and songwriter. His production, writing and mixing credits include Ozzy Osbourne & Black Sabbath, Marilyn Manson, Tony lommi, Rob Zombie, Shinedown, Seether, Saliva, Lynyrd Skynyrd, Alice Cooper, and Sheryl Crow.

== Career ==
Marlette started out as a session musician and the first album he appeared on was Al Stewart's 24 Carrots. He has then worked as a musician, mainly as keyboardist and pianist, and composer for numerous artists including Tracy Chapman, John Wetton, Laura Branigan, Alice Cooper, Krokus and The Storm.

In 1994 he produced Red Square Black's Square EP, his first collaboration with John 5, which would be followed by David Lee Roth's album DLR Band, 2wo (industrial metal project of John 5 and Rob Halford), the mixing of the UK bonus CD of Marilyn Manson's The Last Tour on Earth and Loser. In the late 1990s besides Rob Halford he started producing other big hard rock names like Black Sabbath and Tony Iommi, and Quiet Riot.

In the new millennium he became famous for producing hit-records for post-grunge and alternative metal bands as well as traditional hard rock bands. In 2011, he produced heavy metal band Anvil's new album Juggernaut of Justice, their first album after the documentary Anvil! The Story of Anvil. He is a regular at Monnow Valley Studio in Rockfield, Monmouthshire.

In addition, Marlette produced, mixed, and engineered Shinedown’s debut album Leave a Whisper, which was certified Platinum in the United States, and produced Saliva’s album Every Six Seconds, also certified Platinum. Marlette went on to produce the band’s follow-up Back Into Your System, which earned Gold certification, and co-wrote and produced their hit single “Ladies and Gentlemen,” which peaked at number 2 on Billboard’s Mainstream Rock chart and number 25 on the Alternative Songs chart, later achieving Gold status.

His work on Seether’s Disclaimer II contributed to the album’s Platinum certification in the U.S. and Gold status in multiple countries, with the single “Broken” reaching 4× Platinum. Marlette also produced the studio tracks on Black Sabbath’s Reunion, which was certified Platinum in the U.S. and Canada and Silver in the U.K..

== Selected discography ==
- ÆGES – Weightless
- Airbourne – Breakin' Outta Hell
- Airbourne – Runnin' Wild
- Alice Cooper – Brutal Planet
- Alice Cooper – Dragontown
- Andy Fraser – Fine, Fine Line
- Ankla – Steep Trails
- Anvil – Juggernaut of Justice
- Anvil – Hope in Hell
- Atreyu – Congregation of the Damned
- Black Sabbath – Reunion
- Black Stone Cherry – Folklore and Superstition
- Black Stone Cherry – Kentucky
- Bleeker Ridge – Small Town Dead
- Dee Carstensen – Beloved One
- Filter – The Sun Comes Out Tonight
- Filter – The Trouble with Angels
- He is Legend – Heavyfruit
- Ill Niño – Confession
- Laura Branigan – Touch
- Lynyrd Skynyrd – God & Guns
- Lynyrd Skynyrd – Last of a Dyin' Breed
- Marilyn Manson – The Last Tour on Earth
- Marshall Crenshaw – Good Evening
- Quiet Riot – Alive and Well
- Red Sun Rising – Polyester Zeal
- Rick Springfield, Tim Pierce & Bob Marlette – Sahara Snow
- Rob Halford – The Essential Halford
- Rob Zombie – Essential
- Rob Zombie – Spookshow International Live
- Rob Zombie – Venomous Rat Regeneration Vendor
- Saliva – Back into Your System
- Saliva – Blood Stained Love Story
- Saliva – Cinco Diablo
- Saliva – Every Six Seconds
- Sebastian Bach – Abachalypse Now
- Sebastian Bach – Give Em' Hell
- Sebastian Bach – Kicking & Screaming
- Seether – Disclaimer II
- Seether – Karma and Effect
- Seether – Seether: 2002–2013
- Shinedown – Leave A Whisper
- Smashing Satellites – SonicAluzion
- Texas Hippie Coalition – Ride On
- Texas Hippie Coalition – Gunsmoke
- Tonight Alive – Limitless
- Tony Iommi – Iommi
- Tony Iommi/Glenn Hughes – Fused
- Tracy Chapman – Crossroads
- Tracy Chapman – Tracy Chapman
- Union – The Blue Room
- Wilson Phillips – Shadows and Light
- 2wo – Voyeurs
