= Click Click Boom =

Single by Saliva

from the album Every Six Seconds
- Released: August 7, 2001
- Recorded: 1999–2000
- Genre: Nu metal; rap metal
- Length: 4:12
- Label: Island
- Songwriters: Bob Marlette; Josey Scott; Chris D'Abaldo; Wayne Swinny
- Producer: Bob Marlette

Saliva singles chronology
"Your Disease" (2000)	"Click Click Boom" (2001)	"After Me" (2001)

Music video
- "Click Click Boom" on YouTube

"Click Click Boom" is a song by American rock band Saliva. It was released in August 2001, as the second single from their second studio album Every Six Seconds (2001), and later reappeared on the band's next album Back into Your System (2002) as a special edition bonus track.

The song peaked at number 25 on the Billboard Alternative Airplay chart and number 15 on the Mainstream Rock chart. Following the September 11 attacks, it was included in the list of songs deemed inappropriate for radio airplay by Clear Channel Communications.

In 2017, Annie Zaleski of Spin named "Click Click Boom" the fifteenth-best nu metal track of all time.

== Composition and lyrics ==
Saliva guitarist Wayne Swinny explained that the song came very quickly, and was inspired by the AC/DC anthem "Back in Black", which vocalist Josey Scott fell asleep listening to one night. "When we were kids, that was one of the songs you heard every time you went to a concert before the band actually played," Swinny said. "They'd be playing all the big, cool rock songs, and that's one you always heard. It's just a huge classic rock epic, and he wanted to write a song like that. So he [Scott] listened to it, went to sleep, and apparently dreamed it or just woke up with it in his head and that was where 'Click Click Boom' came from".

== Music video ==
A music video was released for the song. The video revolves around a boy who unwittingly finds himself in a mosh pit in which the band performs. Near the end of the video, after being enticed by a girl straight out from the crowd, the boy joins the moshpit. After the end of the song, the boy is shown moshing alone in the empty space where the band performed.

== Certifications ==
Region	Certification	Certified units/sales
New Zealand (RMNZ)	Gold	15,000^{‡}
United Kingdom (BPI)	Silver	200,000^{‡}
^{‡} Sales+streaming figures based on certification alone.

== Release history ==
Region	Date	Format(s)	Label(s)	Ref.
United States	August 7, 2001	Mainstream rock radio	Island	
