= Saliva (band) =

American rock band

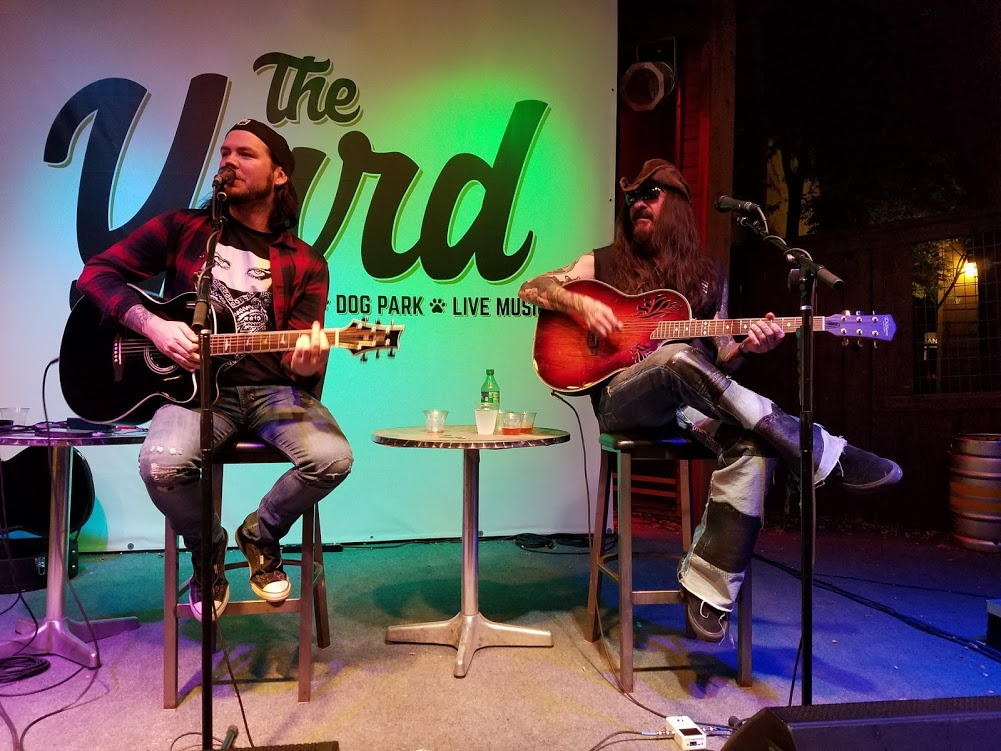
- Saliva performing in 2018

Background information
- Origin: Memphis, Tennessee, U.S.
- Genres: Nu metal; post-grunge; alternative metal; rap metal; hard rock
- Years active: 1996–present
- Labels: Judge & Jury; Megaforce; Rum Bum; Island; Rockingchair; Diamond
- Members: Bobby Amaru; Brad Stewart; Sammi Jo Bishop; Josh Kulack; Sebastian LaBar
- Past members: Todd Poole; Chris D'Abaldo; Josey Scott; Dave Novotny; Wayne Swinny; Paul Crosby; Jonathan Montoya
- Website: salivaofficial.com

Saliva is an American rock band formed in Memphis, Tennessee, in 1996. Their best-known lineup, which lasted from 2000 to 2005, consisted of lead vocalist Josey Scott, lead guitarist Wayne Swinny, rhythm guitarist Chris D'Abaldo, bassist Dave Novotny, and drummer Paul Crosby. The band has undergone multiple line-up changes, with no original members remaining in the band following Swinny's passing in 2023. They have been nominated for one Grammy, and have won one MTV Music Video Award.

After releasing their self-titled debut album in 1997, Saliva signed to Island Records and released their second studio album, Every Six Seconds, which served as their commercial breakthrough. They released third studio album Back into Your System in 2002, which reached No. 19 on the Billboard 200. Back into Your System launched one of Saliva's most successful songs, "Always", reaching No. 51 on the Billboard Hot 100 and No. 1 on the Modern Rock Chart. Three years after their fourth album Survival of the Sickest, Saliva released Blood Stained Love Story in 2007, repeating Back into Your System's chart performance at No. 19 on the Billboard 200. Its first single, "Ladies and Gentlemen", peaked at No. 2 on the Mainstream Rock Chart. The band have since released a further six studio albums – the most recent of which, Revelation, was released in 2023.

The band is known for having their songs played at sporting and professional wrestling events, especially WWE. "A lot of our songs... just lend themselves to sporting events," said Swinny in an interview with Songfacts. "You can't watch... or go to a football game and not hear "Click Click Boom" [and] "Ladies and Gentlemen"."

== History ==
=== Formation and Saliva (1996–1999) ===
Saliva was founded in Bartlett, Tennessee (a suburb of Memphis, Tennessee) in September 1996 by former members of local bands Roxy Blue, Blackbone, and Gemini Clan. The original line-up featured vocalist Josey Scott Sappington, drummer Todd Poole, bassist Dave Novotny, and guitarists Chris D'Abaldo and Wayne Swinny. The band played their first show on Halloween, October 31, 1996 with Sappington dressed in a nun costume and Novotny dressed in a voodoo costume.

In December 1996, four months after forming, the band hastily recorded a demo tape, on the basis of which they were selected, out of 117 local bands, to perform at the second annual Grammy Showcase National Academy of Recording Arts & Sciences' local competition. The band barely had time to finish mixing the tracks of their demo tape at Rockingchair Recording Studios in order to submit their application before the deadline. The local showcase had Saliva perform alongside four other Tennessee and Arkansas bands (DDT Big Band, Mash-o-Matic, Straight Up Buzz and Ashtray Babyhead) on January 24, 1997 at Memphis' New Daisy Tavern. Saliva won the local showcase and advanced to the regional showcase in Austin, Texas on February 7, 1997. Their demo tape had since been remixed with a better production, and the song "Suffocate" was included on the 1997 Grammy Showcase Various Artists compact disc compilation, released through Grammy Recordings, alongside the eleven other bands with whom they would compete in the regional showcases.

Saliva again won first place in the regional showcase and advanced to the national finals in New York City on February 22, 1997, competing against the other two regional finalists: folk trio Maggi, Pierce, and EJ and rock band Save Ferris. Saliva came in second behind Save Ferris, but received consolation prizes including money, equipment, and tickets to 1997's 39th Annual Grammy Awards ceremony. By this point, Saliva had only played six concerts, but began to be courted by major record label A&R scouts.

The band was nominated for Best Newcomer at the 12th Annual Premier Player Awards, the local Memphis edition of the Grammy Awards, held at The Peabody's Memphis Ballroom on April 16, 1997. Saliva also appeared at Memphis' Crossroads '97 music exhibition as part of Memphis in May's Beale Street Music Festival showcase on May 2, 1997.

In the spring and summer of 1997, Saliva returned to Rockingchair Recording Studios in Memphis to record additional songs with producers Bill Pappas and Mark Yoshida, which were combined with the re-mixed songs from their demo tape into their self-titled debut album . Saliva was released on compact disc in mid-August 1997 through producer Yoshida's own independent record label Rockingchair Records. A CD-release party was held at Club 616 in Memphis on Friday, August 15, 1997. The album went on to sell over 10,000 copies within two years, prompting Island Records A&R representatives to again take notice of the band. The band's debut album was repressed following Saliva's major label success through a licensing deal between Rockingchair Records and hip-hop record label Diamond Productions. The reissue was distributed by RED Distribution imprint RUMM (RED Urban Music Marketing) and featured an updated artwork designed by Brandon Seavers at AudioGraphic MasterWorks.

The band performed again at Memphis' Crossroads '98 music exhibition as part of Memphis in May's Beale Street Music Festival showcase on May 3, 1998. Drummer Poole departed in late 1999 and was replaced by Paul Crosby.

=== Every Six Seconds (2000–2001) ===
Saliva's album Every Six Seconds was released in 2001 and featured the singles "Your Disease" and "Click Click Boom", both of which saw significant play on rock radio and helped bring the band into mainstream popularity. The songs "Superstar" and "Click Click Boom" are featured in the film The Fast And The Furious. The band also recorded the main theme to the 2001 SpyHunter game.

=== Back into Your System (2002–2003) ===
Back into Your System, their third album, was released in 2002, which included the chart topping hits "Always", and "Rest in Pieces" co-written by Nikki Sixx (Mötley Crüe) and James Michael. The band toured in 2003, opening for Kiss and Aerosmith.

=== Survival of the Sickest, departure of Chris D'Abaldo, and Jonathan Montoya (2004–2005) ===
Saliva then released Survival of the Sickest on August 17, 2004, which reached number 20 on the Billboard 200. On May 29, 2005, guitarist Chris D'Abaldo announced he had left the band "for obvious reasons, as the band is not a unit anymore." He then shortly retracted his statement and apologized, declaring on the band's website that "there was a bit of an issue we're working through and we're looking forward to recording a new album later this year". However, the band's website later apologized again for the confusion and confirmed that due to "creative differences", D'Abaldo was in fact leaving the band, but that Saliva was "completely moving forward as planned and [has] our best music ahead of us". D'Abaldo eventually moved on to start the band Smolder. Jake Stutevoss formerly of the band Future Leaders of the World replaced him in Saliva's tour lineup. Stutevoss left the group right before the recording sessions for Ladies and Gentlemen. Jonathan Montoya, formerly of Full Devil Jacket, then became the next permanent member of Saliva.

=== Blood Stained Love Story (2006–2007) ===
A new single, titled "Ladies and Gentlemen" was released in November 2006 to radio stations and made it to No. 2 on the US Mainstream Rock charts. Saliva released the album Blood Stained Love Story on January 23, 2007. It has also been included as the background music for a number of Sony's commercials for the PlayStation 3. It was also made the official Theme song for WrestleMania 23. The second single released off of the album was "Broken Sunday", which reached No. 8 on the Mainstream Rock chart. Saliva's tour manager Chris stated that the new single off Blood Stained Love Story would be "King of the Stereo".

=== Cinco Diablo, Greatest Hits and departure of Jonathan Montoya (2008–2010) ===
In an interview with WWE on February 27, Scott said "We're going to go in the studio probably around May and record our next record. If you like "Ladies and Gentlemen" and "Click Click Boom", and more dynamic stuff, it's going to be an ass-whooping of a record. It's going to be 45 minutes of ass-whooping!" Saliva toured with Sevendust in South Korea, Japan and a brief stint in Europe until July 2008.

As of April 30, 2008, Octane 20 on Sirius Satellite Radio began playing a new song titled "Don't Question My Heart", featuring Brent Smith from Shinedown. The song can be found on the album WWE The Music, Vol. 8, and was the official television theme song for the ECW brand.

Saliva's sixth studio album is titled Cinco Diablo and was released on December 16, 2008. "Hunt You Down" was a song on the album that was then made the official WWE No Way Out 2009 theme song in February 2009. Saliva also made a song titled "I Walk Alone", which is a theme song used by Batista since 2005, which has been used in Gears 5 upon starting a Versus match as him as a skin of Marcus Fenix via an update.

The band worked on a reality television show style DVD following the recording of Cinco Diablo and life on the road. In an interview with MJP, Josey was asked if it was a TV Show to which Josey stated "I hope not", and stated that he wanted it more as "a DVD for our fans".

Saliva went on tour with Pop Evil, Since October, Dead Season, and Aranda. They were scheduled to join the 13th annual SnoCore Tour, but singer Josey Scott had ulcer surgery. Walt Lafty of Silvertide was hired to fill in for Scott for the tour, but Saliva ultimately decided to drop out of the tour, instead of touring with Lafty.

On March 23, 2010, the band released a Greatest Hits album titled, Moving Forward in Reverse: Greatest Hits. "Time to Shine" from said album was used as the official theme song for the "WWE Extreme Rules" Pay-Per-View in 2010.

On August 30, 2010, the band announced the departure of guitarist Jonathan Montoya, saying that they would carry on as a four piece.

=== Under Your Skin and departure of Josey Scott (2010–2011) ===
They had begun recording their seventh album, titled Under Your Skin, with Howard Benson.

The band supplied a song titled "Badass" to the Saw 3D soundtrack released on October 26, 2010.

The band released the lead single from their new album Under Your Skin, entitled "Nothing". It was digitally released on February 1, 2011. "Badass" was later released as the second single, and reached No. 26 on Billboard's Mainstream Rock Tracks.

At the end of 2011, after 15 years with the band, Josey Scott decided to leave Saliva to pursue a solo Christian music career, as it was announced to public. It was later revealed by Scott that he left the band to "be a father and get sober and clean up [his] life and find [himself] mentally and spiritually and philosophically".

=== Bobby Amaru, In It to Win It, Rise Up and departure of Dave Novotny (2012–2015) ===
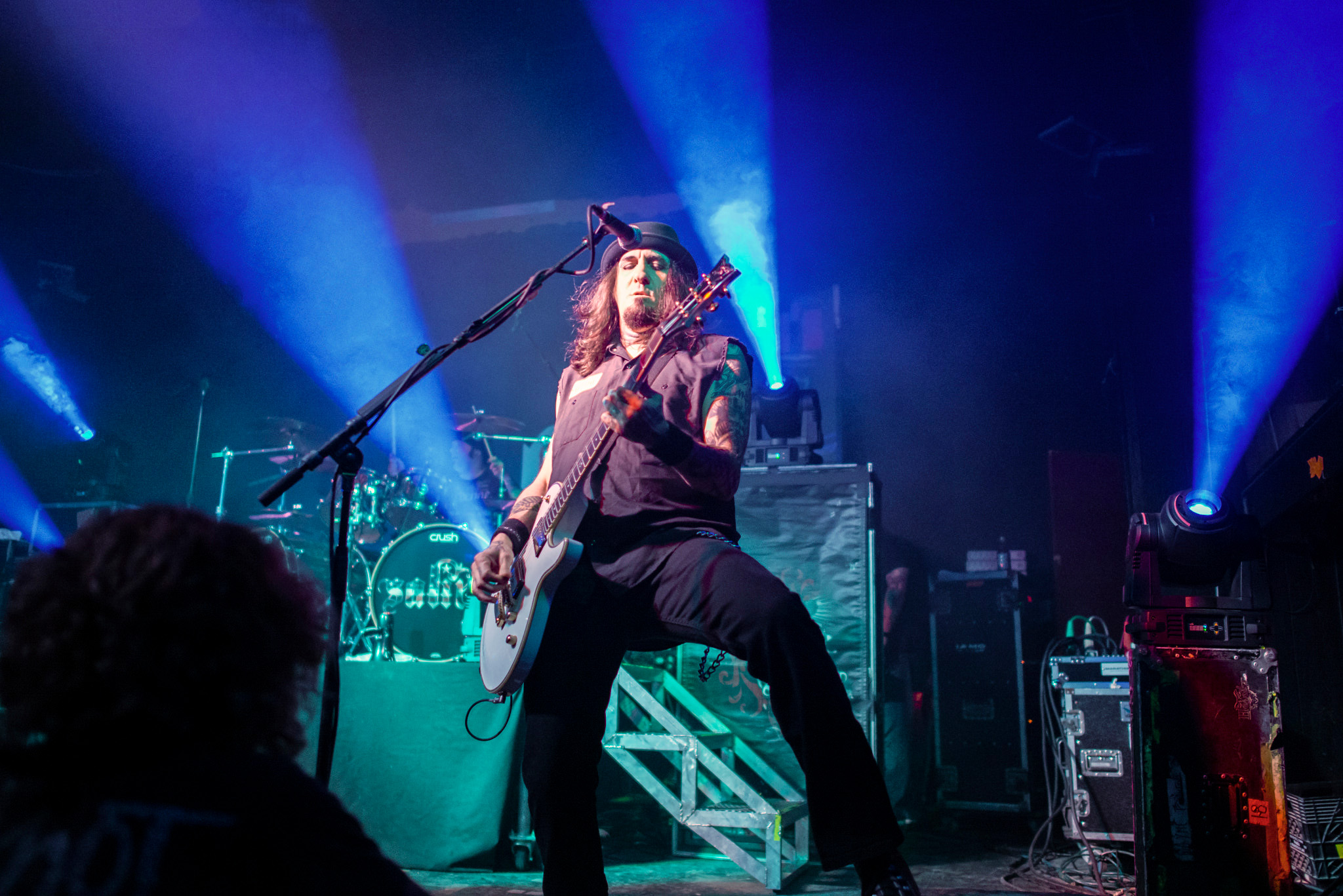
Saliva performing in 2013

In early January 2012 it was announced that Bobby Amaru has joined Saliva as the new vocalist. According to Wayne, "he is a 28-year-old singer, songwriter, producer from Jacksonville, Florida who has a GREAT voice and will not only bring some fresh blood into the band but; will also put a new spin on the Saliva sound." Amaru was the frontman of his solo band Amaru, as well as the drummer for Burn Season.

On February 10, 2012, Saliva released a brand new single named "All Around the World" and said to write a brand new album straight after the tour. In addition to "All Around the World", the band has been performing another new song titled "One More Night" on their current tour with 12 Stones and Royal Bliss.

On November 30, 2012, it was announced that the band had just signed a new record deal with Rumbum Records and that after they have finished their current tour, the band will return home to finish writing the new album and begin recording in January for a release date some time in the spring.

On February 5, 2013, Saliva began recording a new album which would later be named In It to Win It. In It to Win It was to be the band's eighth record (1st with RumBum Records) with producer Bobby Huff, and executive producer Luis Bacardi. Bobby Huff co-wrote Saliva's single "Badass" and has worked with artists such as Meat Loaf, 3 Doors Down and Cavo.

On April 30, 2013, the band released its first single from the new album, title track "In It To Win It". On September 3, 2013, the band released the album In It to Win It. On January 22, 2014, a new single "Rise Up" was announced. It was also revealed that In It to Win It had a limited release, and the band planned to release the new record titled Rise Up. Rise Up was ultimately released with three of In It to Win It's songs removed. On June 4, 2014, Swinny announced that rhythm guitarist Jonathan Montoya had returned the band after almost four years.

In February 2015, bassist Dave Novotny left the band and was replaced by former Shinedown bassist Brad Stewart.

=== Love, Lies & Therapy (2016–2017) ===
On April 16, 2016, Saliva announced their new album, titled Love, Lies & Therapy would be released June 10, 2016. Later in May, the group announced they would be supporting the album by taking part of the "Make America Rock Again" tour in the summer 2016 alongside Trapt, Saving Abel, Alien Ant Farm, Crazy Town, 12 Stones, Tantric and Drowning Pool, Fuel, Puddle Of Mudd and P.O.D.

On October 16, 2025, the band released a new single titled "Too Broke To Fix" featuring Austin John Winkler of Hinder.

=== 10 Lives, lineup changes, reunion with Josey Scott, death of Wayne Swinny, and Revelation (2018–present) ===
In mid-2018, drummer Paul Crosby announced his departure from the band after 18 years. Shortly afterward, bassist Brad Stewart would also depart to focus on other touring and projects. Saliva then released their tenth studio record, 10 Lives, on October 19, 2018, via Megaforce Records. The album was produced by frontman Bobby Amaru and Steve Perreira in Jacksonville, Florida. In 2019, both Crosby and Stewart confirmed their return to the band. Saliva would go on to tour in 2019 as a part of Puddle of Mudd's Muddfest.

In October 2019, former vocalist Josey Scott announced on The Morning Dump podcast that he planned to reunite with Saliva for a tour and a new studio album. This was confirmed by Swinny in an interview with Detroit's WRIF Radio, adding that although "there's nothing on paper," the reunion should take place from 2020 into 2021 to commemorate the 20th anniversary of Every Six Seconds. In addition to Scott rejoining, Swinny also suggested that former guitarist Chris D'Abaldo may also be taking part. In January 2021, it was announced that these plans were put on hold due to the COVID-19 pandemic.

On April 16, 2021, the band released a music video for "After Me" following the 20th anniversary of their second album Every Six Seconds. Also, guitarist and founder Wayne Swinney sat out touring for August, due to testing positive for COVID-19, with 9th Planet guitarist Josh Kulack filling in for him.

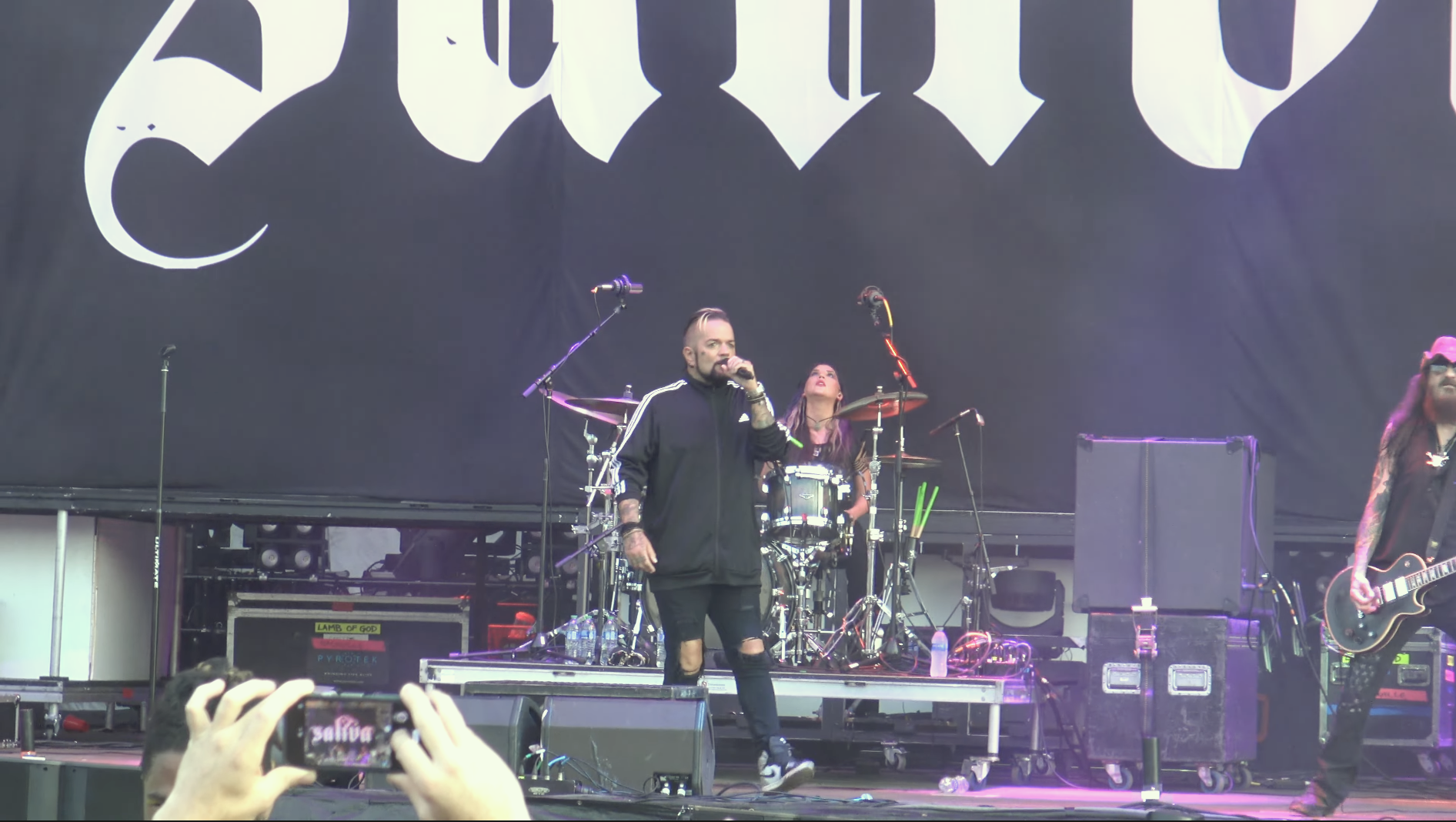
Josey Scott performing with Saliva at Blue Ridge Rock Festival 2022

On May 14, 2022, Paul Crosby left Saliva for the second time. The band kept performing with Lee Hutt before Sammi Jo Bishop was announced as their permanent drummer.

On September 11, 2022, Josey Scott made his first appearance with the band as a special guest since departing in 2011, where they performed three songs together: "Your Disease", "Always", and "Click Click Boom."

On March 22, 2023, guitarist and founding member Wayne Swinny died from a brain hemorrhage, at the age of 59. He was the last original member who still remained with the band.

In the weeks following Swinny's death, the band announced they would be continuing in honour of him. They completed a North American co-headlining tour with Drowning Pool, with support from Adelitas Way and Any Given Sin, across September and October 2023.

In May 2023, Scott announced that he would begin touring with a new band entitled Josey Scott's Saliva, performing Saliva's songs from his era as well as his new songs.

In September 2023, the band released their 11th studio album, Revelation. The album, recorded over the pandemic, is the last to feature Swinny's guitar playing.

The band are confirmed to be making an appearance at Welcome to Rockville, which will take place in Daytona Beach, Florida in May 2026.

== Musical style ==
AllMusic said the band's style is a "mix of angsty hard rock and hip-hop," Staff writer Greg Prato stated that the band's sound was rooted in nu metal and post-grunge, and evolved towards a "heavier hard rock sound" later in its career.

== Band members ==
Current

- Bobby Amaru – lead vocals (2011–present); drums (studio, 2018)
- Brad Stewart – bass, backing vocals (2015–2018, 2019–present)
- Sammi Jo Bishop – drums (2022–present)
- Josh Kulack – lead guitar, backing vocals (2024–present; touring 2021, 2022, 2023–2024)
- Sebastian LaBar – rhythm guitar, backing vocals (2024–present; touring 2023–2024)

Former

- Todd Poole – drums, backing vocals (1996–1999)
- Chris D'Abaldo – rhythm guitar, backing vocals (1996–2005)
- Josey Scott – lead vocals (1996–2011; guest 2022)
- Dave Novotny - bass, backing vocals (1996–2015)
- Jonathan Montoya – rhythm guitar, backing vocals (2005–2010, 2014–2015)
- Damien Starkey – bass, backing vocals (2018–2019)
- Tosha Jones – drums (2018–2019)
- Paul Crosby – drums (2000–2018, 2019–2022)
- Wayne Swinny – lead guitar, backing vocals (1996–2023; his death), rhythm guitar (2010–2014, 2015–2023)

Session and touring

- Zach Myers – bass (2004, 2005)
- Chris Hahn – rhythm guitar (2005–2006)
- Jake Stutevoss – rhythm guitar (2006–2007)
- Eric Bice – drums (2009, 2012)
- Steve Perreira – bass (2018)
- Lee Hutt – drums (2022)

== Discography ==
Studio albums

- Saliva (1997)
- Every Six Seconds (2001)
- Back into Your System (2002)
- Survival of the Sickest (2004)
- Blood Stained Love Story (2007)
- Cinco Diablo (2008)
- Under Your Skin (2011)
- In It to Win It (2013)
- Love, Lies & Therapy (2016)
- 10 Lives (2018)
- Revelation (2023)
- Breaking Through (2026)
