= Josey Scott =

American singer

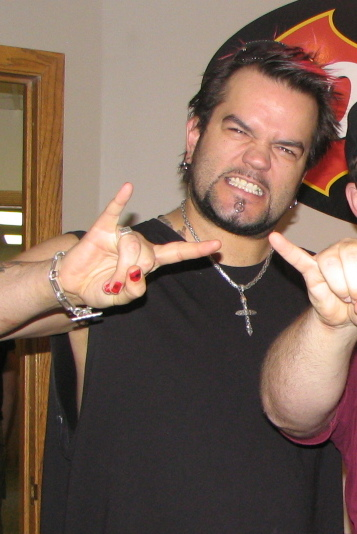
- Scott in 2008

Background information
- Born: Joseph Scott Sappington; May 3, 1972 (age 54); Memphis, Tennessee, U.S.
- Genres: Hard rock; nu metal; post-grunge; rap metal; alternative metal
- Occupations: Singer; songwriter
- Years active: 1991–present
- Formerly of: BlackBone; Saliva
- Website: joseyscottrocks.com

Joseph Scott Sappington (born May 3, 1972) is an American singer, best known as the former lead vocalist of the rock band Saliva. He also performed "Hero" (which was used as one of the theme songs to the 2002 film Spider-Man) with Chad Kroeger of Nickelback.

== Career ==
Prior to Saliva, Scott fronted a Memphis-area heavy metal band called BlackBone in the early 1990s. He also plays drums and guitar. He made a cameo appearance on Jay-Z's "Takeover" from his 2001 album The Blueprint. He has also recorded with Lil Wyte ("Homicidal, Suicidal" and "Crazy"), Three 6 Mafia ("Getting Fucked Up" and "Mosh Pit"), and The X-Ecutioners ("(Even) More Human Than Human").

Scott has had minor roles in television and film. He played Rodney Gronbeck, an LAPD computer expert, in the TNT crime drama Wanted. He also had a cameo appearance in the film Hustle & Flow as Elroy, the corner-store employee who sells marijuana to D-Jay, the main character played by Terrance Howard.

Scott sang the song "If You Wanna Get to Heaven" in the straight-to-DVD feature film The Dukes of Hazzard: The Beginning; the song features when the General Lee is pulled from the water.

In 2002, Scott collaborated with Chad Kroeger from the rock band Nickelback on the Spider-Man theme song "Hero". This recording also featured Tyler Connolly, Mike Kroeger, Matt Cameron, and Jeremy Taggart. Winning the Best Video from a Film on the MTV Music Video Awards a year later on 2003.

Scott appeared as a hidden character in the video game Tiger Woods PGA Tour 2003, which features three Saliva songs on the soundtrack: "Raise Up", "Superstar", and "Superstar II (EA Mix)", which is exclusive to the game.

Saliva guitarist, Wayne Swinny, said in 2013 that Scott had decided to leave the band to pursue a solo Christian career. In October 2019, Scott announced that he would be reuniting with Saliva for a new album and tour.

In May 2023, Scott announced that he would begin touring with a new band entitled Josey Scott's Saliva, performing Saliva's song from his era as well as his new songs.

In January 2024, Scott rebranded Josey Scott's Saliva into his solo project.

In August 2026, Scott appeared in Season 4, episode 16 of the A&E series My Strange Arrest to discuss when a male stole his band's tour trailer and was later arrested wearing the group's merchandise that had occurred earlier that year in May.

== Personal life ==
Scott is married and has three sons and two daughters. His eldest son, Cody, died from complications due to COVID-19 in May 2021 at the age of 29. He is a devout and practicing Christian and sings at his local church.

== Discography ==
=== Studio albums ===
| Year | Artist | Album | No. of Singles |
|---|---|---|---|
| 1995 | Blackbone | Homegrown | 0 |
| 1997 | Saliva | Saliva | 1 |
| 2001 | Saliva | Every Six Seconds | 3 |
| 2002 | Saliva | Back into Your System | 3 |
| 2004 | Saliva | Survival of the Sickest | 2 |
| 2007 | Saliva | Blood Stained Love Story | 3 |
| 2008 | Saliva | Cinco Diablo | 3 |
| 2010 | Saliva | Moving Forward in Reverse: Greatest Hits | 1 |
| 2011 | Saliva | Under Your Skin | 3 |

=== Singles ===
| Year | Single | Chart positions | | |
| Year | Single | US Hot 100 | US Alt. | Adult Pop |
|---|---|---|---|---|
| 2002 | "Hero" | 3 | 1 | 5 |

=== Collaborations ===
- He was featured in the song "Brother" by hard rock band Breaking Point.
- He also co-wrote and performed the song "Hero" with Chad Kroeger.
- He has also recorded with Lil Wyte in the songs "Homicidal, Suicidal" and "Crazy".
- He also has recorded with Three 6 Mafia in the songs "Getting Fucked Up" and "Mosh Pit".
- He was also featured on the song "(Even) More Human Than Human" by The X-Ecutioners.
- He was also featured on the Silent Theory track "Just My Luck".
- He was also featured on Saliva's re-visited song "Click Click Boom" with Doobie.

== Awards and nominations ==
Grammy Awards

| Year | Nominated work | Award | Result |
|---|---|---|---|
| 2002 | "Your Disease" | Best Hard Rock Performance | Nominated |
| 2003 | "Hero" (with Chad Kroeger) | Best Rock Performance by a Duo or Group with Vocal | Nominated |
| 2003 | "Hero" (with Chad Kroeger) | Best Rock Song | Nominated |
| 2003 | "Hero" (with Chad Kroeger) | Best Song Written for Visual Media | Nominated |

MTV Video Music Awards

| Year | Nominated work | Award | Result |
|---|---|---|---|
| 2002 | "Hero" (from Spider-Man) | Best Video from a Film | Won |
