= Starset discography =

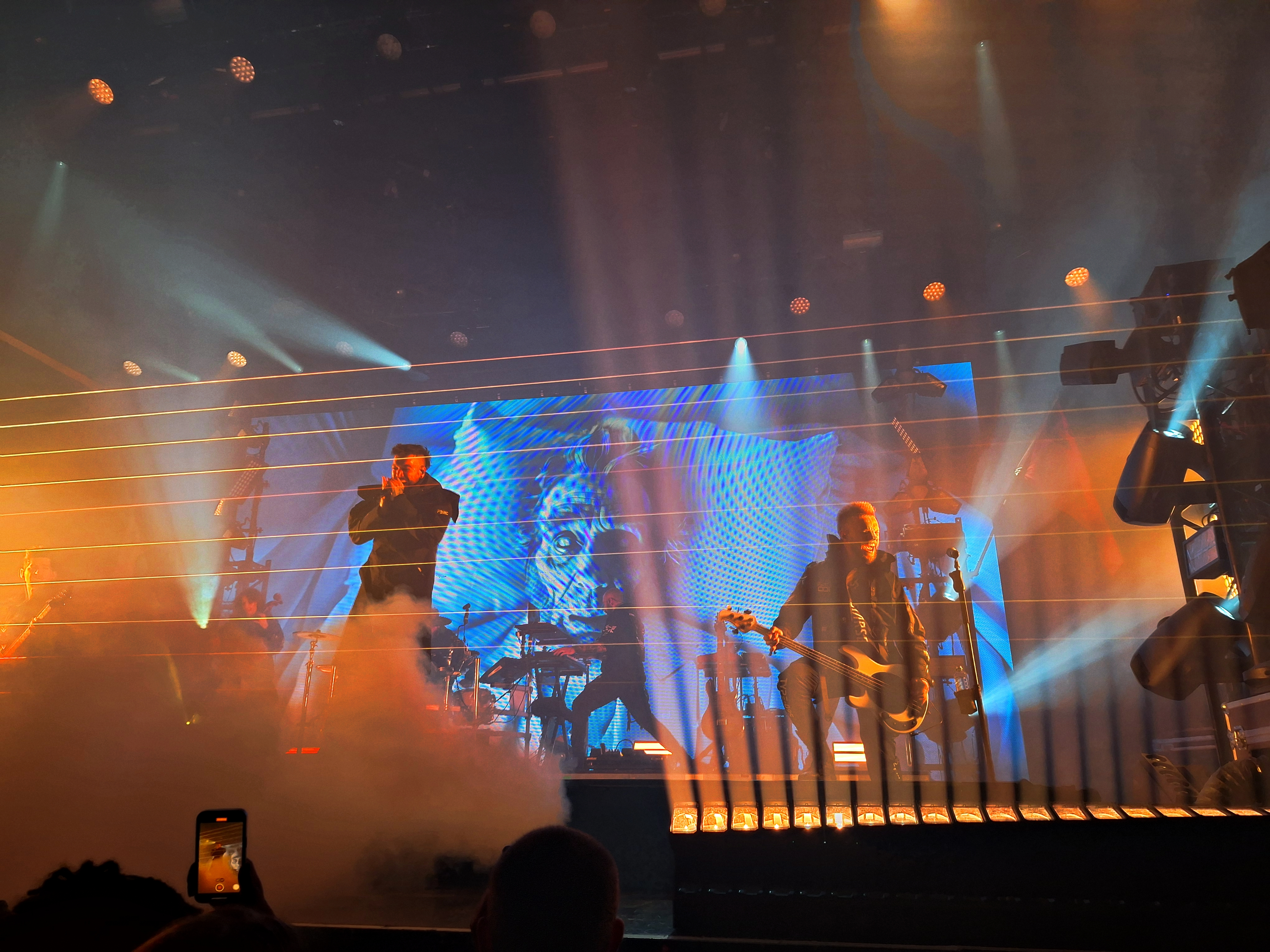
- Starset in 2024
- Studio albums: 5
- Singles: 42
- Music videos: 29

American rock band Starset has released five studio albums, forty-two singles, and twenty-nine music videos.

== Studio albums ==
List of studio albums, with selected chart positions
Title	Album details	Peak chart positions									
Title	Album details	US	US Alt.	US Dig.	US Hard	US Rock	AUS	AUT	CAN	UK Dig.	UK Rock
Transmissions	Released: July 8, 2014; Label: Razor & Tie; Formats: CD, LP, digital download	49	12	24	5	16	—	—	—	—	—
Vessels	Released: January 20, 2017; Label: Razor & Tie; Formats: CD, LP, digital download	11	2	3	2	3	52	56	60	53	13
Divisions	Released: September 13, 2019; Label: Fearless; Formats: CD, LP, digital download	37	6	7	4	7	— (Note: Divisions did not enter the ARIA Albums Chart, but peaked at number 22 on the ARIA Digital Album Chart.)	—	—	29	8
Horizons	Released: October 22, 2021; Label: Fearless; Formats: CD, LP, digital download	— (Note: Horizons did not enter the Billboard 200, but peaked at number 27 on the Top Albums Sales chart.)	22	—	10	38	—	—	—	22	28
Silos	Released: September 12, 2025; Label: Fearless; Formats: CD, LP, digital download	— (Note: Silos did not enter the Billboard 200, but peaked at number 18 on the Top Album Sales chart.)	—	—	—	—	—	—	—	— (Note: Silos did not enter the UK Digital Albums Chart, but peaked at number 52 on the UK Album Downloads Chart.)	—
Revelations	Released: December 4, 2026; Label: Fearless; Formats: CD, LP, digital download										
"—" denotes a recording that did not chart or was not released in that territory.

== Singles ==
List of singles as lead artist, showing year released, certifications and album name
Title	Year	Peak chart positions						Certifications	Album
Title	Year	US Rock Airplay	US Rock Digital	US Main	US Rock	US Hard Rock Digital	US Hard Rock	Certifications	Album
"My Demons"	2013	26	—	5	36	—	—	RIAA: Platinum; MC: Gold; BPI: Silver	Transmissions
"Carnivore"	2014	—	—	16	—	—	—		Transmissions
"Down with the Fallen"	2014	—	—	—	—	—	—		Transmissions
"Let It Die"	2014	—	—	—	—	—	—		Transmissions
"The Future is Now"	2014	—	—	—	—	—	—		Transmissions
"Rise and Fall"	2014	—	—	—	—	—	—		Transmissions
"Halo"	2015	41	—	16	—	—	—		Transmissions
"Monster"	2016	14	16	2	27	4	—		Vessels
"Satellite"	2017	40	—	12	—	—	—		Vessels
"Back to the Earth"	2017	—	—	—	—	14	—		Vessels
"Ricochet"	2017	—	—	—	49	7	—		Vessels
"Die for You"	2017	—	—	—	—	—	—		Vessels
"Telepathic"	2017	—	—	—	—	—	—		Vessels
"Bringing It Down" (Version 2.0)	2018	—	—	—	—	—	—		Vessels 2.0
"Love You to Death" (Type O Negative cover)	2018	—	—	—	—	—	—		Vessels 2.0
"Manifest"	2019	50	—	14	—	—	—		Divisions
"Where the Skies End"	2019	—	—	—	—	—	—		Divisions
"Diving Bell"	2019	—	—	—	—	—	—		Divisions
"Stratosphere"	2019	—	—	—	—	—	—		Divisions
"Trials"	2020	29	—	8	—	—	11		Divisions
"Echo"	2021	—	—	—	—	—	—		Divisions
"Kashmir" (Led Zeppelin cover)	2021	—	—	—	—	—	—		Non-album single
"Infected"	2021	—	—	16	—	10	21		Horizons
"The Breach"	2021	—	—	—	—	—	22		Horizons
"Leaving This World Behind"	2021	—	—	—	—	—	—		Horizons
"Earthrise"	2021	—	—	—	—	—	—		Horizons
"Devolution"	2021	—	—	—	—	—	—		Horizons
"Otherworldly"	2022	—	—	—	—	—	—		Horizons
"Symbiotic"	2022	—	—	—	—	—	—		Horizons
"Icarus"	2022	—	—	—	—	—	—		Horizons
"Waiting on the Sky to Change" (with Breaking Benjamin)	2022	15	11	2	32	2	3		Non-album single
"Brave New World"	2024	—	14	—	—	3	9		Silos
"Degenerate"	2024	—	—	—	—	5	13		Silos
"TokSik"	2024	45	—	12	—	6	15		Silos
"Dystopia"	2024	—	—	—	—	6	15		Silos
"Dark Things"	2025	—	—	—	—	6	12		Silos
"Head over Heels" (Tears for Fears cover)	2025	—	—	—	—	—	—		Silos
"Silos"	2025	—	—	—	—	5	25		Silos
"Shattered Dreams" (Johnny Hates Jazz cover)	2025	—	—	—	—	—	—		Silos
"We Are Empire"	2026	—	—	—	—	7	21		Arknights: Endfield
"Paradoxic"	2026	—	—	—	—	—	19		Revelations
"Annihilation"	2026	—	—	32	—	—	18		Revelations
"Transfusion"	2026	—	—	—	—	—	23		Revelations
"Voyager"	2026	—	—	—	—	—	—		Revelations
"—" denotes a recording that did not chart or was not released in that territory.

== Other certified songs ==
Title	Year	Certifications	Album
"It Has Begun"	2014	RIAA: Gold	Transmissions

== Music videos ==
List of music videos, showing year released, album and director(s)
Title	Year	Album	Director
"My Demons"	2014	Transmissions	Denver Cavins
"Carnivore"	2014	Transmissions	Ramon Boutviseth
"Halo"	2015	Transmissions	Corbin Thomas
"Monster"	2017	Vessels	Punk City
"Back to the Earth"	2017	Vessels	Mungo Creative Group
"Telepathic"	2017	Vessels	Dustin Bates
"Satellite"	2017	Vessels	Kyle Cogan
"Ricochet"	2018	Vessels	Nick Peterson
"Bringing It Down" (Version 2.0)	2018	Vessels 2.0	Brian Cox
"Manifest"	2019	Divisions	Andrew Donoho
"Where the Skies End"	2019	Divisions	Caleb Mallery
"Diving Bell"	2019	Divisions	Caleb Mallery
"Stratosphere"	2019	Divisions	Caleb Mallery
"Trials"	2020	Divisions	Nick Peterson
"Echo"	2021	Divisions	Dan Fusselman
"The Breach"	2021	Horizons	Nick Peterson
"Symbiotic"	2022	Horizons	Spencer Sease
"Icarus"	2022	Horizons	Nick Peterson
"Brave New World"	2024	Silos	Anders Rostad
"Degenerate"	2024	Silos	George Gallardo Kattah
"TokSik"	2024	Silos	Christopher Phelps
"Dystopia"	2024	Silos	Christopher Phelps
"Dark Things"	2025	Silos	Jeb Hardwick
"Head over Heels"	2025	Silos	Jeb Hardwick
"Silos"	2025	Silos	Christopher Phelps
"Shattered Dreams"	2025	Silos	Jeb Hardwick
"Ad Astra"	2025	Silos	Scotty Felix
"Sway"	2025	Silos	Scotty Felix
"Paradoxic"	2026	Revelations	Jeb Hardwick
"Annihilation"	2026	Revelations	Jeb Hardwick
"Transfusion"	2026	Revelations	Jeb Hardwick
"Voyager"	2026	Revelations	Jeb Hardwick
