= Radiocalypse =

Studio album by Downplay
- Released: May 29, 2012
- Genre: Hard rock; alternative metal
- Length: 32:27
- Producer: Dave Fortman, Bryan Patrick

Downplay chronology
Beyond the Machine (2011)	Radiocalypse (2012)	The Human Condition (2012)

Radiocalypse is the fourth studio album by American rock band Downplay, released on May 29, 2012. It is the final album with guitarist Trevor Connor before his death in late 2012.

== Background ==
In addition to seven new original songs, the album contains rerecordings of two older Downplay songs. "Save Me" was previously released on their 2009 EP Rise. Fall. Repeat. "Sleep" was originally released on their 2007 album A Day Without Gravity, and also on Rise. Fall. Repeat. with a different arrangement. The arrangement on Radiocalypse is closer to the arrangement on Rise. Fall. Repeat.

The album also includes Downplay's second recorded cover song, "Talking in Your Sleep" by The Romantics.

"Hated You From Hello" was used by WWE during the 2011 Slammy Awards.

A music video for "Where Did You Go" was filmed at Downplay's show at the Newport Music Hall in Columbus, OH on June 2, 2012.

A song called "Dark on Me" was recorded during the sessions for Radiocalypse, but was ultimately not included. The song was rearranged by lead singer Dustin Bates for his new project Starset, and appears on their debut album Transmissions. The original Downplay version resurfaced on YouTube in 2016.

== Track listing ==
No.	Title	Length
1.	"Save Me"	3:01
2.	"Bury Myself Alive"	3:24
3.	"Shadow With You"	3:12
4.	"Talking in Your Sleep"	3:37
5.	"Sleep"	3:12
6.	"Tomorrow"	3:11
7.	"Hated You From Hello"	2:49
8.	"My Own Nightmare"	2:57
9.	"Where Did You Go"	4:08
10.	"Won't Let Go"	2:56
Total length:		32:27

== Personnel ==
Downplay

- Dustin Bates – vocals, additional guitars
- Trevor Connor - lead guitars
- Evan McKeever - rhythm guitars
- Corey Catlett - bass
- Brian Patrick - drums

Production

- Dave Fortman – production, mixing
- Bryan Patrick – production, mixing
- Jeremy Parker – engineer
- Robert Vosgien – mastering

Additional personnel

- Paul Trust – composer
- Jasen Rauch – composer
