= Downplay =

American alternative metal band

- Origin: Athens, Ohio, U.S.
- Genres: Alternative metal; hard rock; alternative rock
- Years active: 2001–2013 (hiatus)
- Labels: Epic; True Anomaly; In De Groot; FEC
- Members: Dustin Bates; Ron DeChant; Brian Patrick
- Past members: George Andres; Brandon Hill; Greg Huzyak; Nick Kiser; Chad White; Mike Mealey; Bobby Withers; Derek Snowden; Brandon Zano; Trevor Connor; Corey Catlett; Evan McKeever

Downplay was an American alternative metal band formed in Athens, Ohio, in 2001. The group consisted of vocalist Dustin Bates, bassist Ron DeChant, and drummer Brian Patrick. The band released five full-length studio albums and three EPs independently, under various labels between 2007 and 2010. The band went on hiatus in 2013, with Bates and DeChant focusing on their new project, Starset.

== History ==
=== Formation and Saturday (2001–2006) ===
Downplay originated near Youngstown, OH, in Salem, in 2001, originally as a cover band. Soon after, the band (composed of Dustin Bates, Brandon Hill, Nick Kiser, and Chad White) moved to Ohio University in Athens, where two of the original members enrolled. Over the next three years the band found a fan base in the Athens area while attending school there.

One story says that the band's name was ironically stumbled upon during one of the many fights that occurred during the early days of the original Downplay line-up, as Bates accused another band member of "downplaying" his role in the argument. But it has been said in interviews that Bates did not want their original music to be downplayed whilst they were still a cover band. Most of the band's early riffs and music were based on bass player Greg Huzyak's heavy and groovy riffs bore from his love of Led Zeppelin and early blues rock bands like the Allman Brothers, Duran Duran, and Jimi Hendrix's Band of Gypsys

In 2005, Downplay reorganized as an original band. Their first studio album, Saturday, was recorded "in about a day" on a $1,000 budget at Ohio University's student-run audio production studio and released during their time at OU. It included a “bonus track,” a spoof hip-hop song about an OU frat bar, "The Crystal", which became a student/bar favorite with over 3,000 downloads. Downplay found its niche for energetic live rock shows at Ohio University, playing famous events like the Halloween Block Party, PalmerFest, and the numbered fests (threefest fourfest, fivefest, etc.). In 2006, upon most of the members graduating from OU, the band moved to Columbus, OH, and played a mix of covers and original music.

=== A Day Without Gravity (2007–2009) ===
Downplay returned to the studio in late 2007, this time at Cleveland-based Jungle Recording Studio. Around the same time Bates, with the contribution of loyal friends, established an indie rock record label (True Anomaly Records, LLC), and signed Downplay to the label under a one-album contract. A Day Without Gravity, the band's second studio album. was released in October. This record had a more polished sound and displayed the band's improvements in song writing over their first album, and helped the band begin to expand across the state of Ohio. In 2008, Mike Mealey became Downplay's fifth member. The band's lineup was then reconfigured completely, save for Bates and Mealey, in 2009.

The year of 2009 was full of showcases for Atlantic, Virgin/Capitol, Island, Mercury, and Epic Records, both in Columbus and in New York City for Downplay. On November 17, they released their first EP Rise. Fall. Repeat. From this time into the first half of 2010, Bobby Withers, Ron DeChant, Derek Snowden, and Brandon Zano were in the band for a short amount of time.

=== Line-up change and record deal (2010–2011) ===
The band signed with In De Goot Management in April 2010 and went on their first major tour with Puddle of Mudd and Sevendust. In June, the band signed with Epic Records. Immediately after, Bates went to Los Angeles to begin writing the first major-label debut. "We're the first hard rock band to sign with Epic Records in the last five years," said Bates. Throughout this period, Downplay accumulated the lineup of Trevor Connor, Evan Mckeever, Brian Patrick and Corey Catlett. As a holder of an electrical engineering degree and a master's degree in avionic engineering, Bates said he was moving toward a PhD at Ohio University, "clear up until the record deal."

In January 2011, Downplay began recording their third record with producer Dave Fortman (Evanescence, Slipknot, Mudvayne, Godsmack) in New Orleans where they cut their first album. The working title was Sleep; the album would have 12 songs and two bonus tracks available for download from iTunes, as well as a different track from Amazon. It was finished in May 2011. Downplay played with a number of rock bands, including Chevelle, 10 Years, Theory of a Deadman, Crossfade, and others at a number of major rock festivals, including Rock on the Range in Columbus and XFest in Dayton. In October 2011, after realizing that the album that was recorded for Epic would not come out until 2012, the band quickly got in the studio and recorded an album that was to be released on December 1 for all the fans that they had promised a record to by the end of 2011, which turned out to be their third studio album Beyond the Machine. Then later in the month, the band was dropped by Epic Records so the label could sign bands from the new TV show, The X-Factor, which lead to Sleep being scrapped, and never released. In December, Downplay released their first music video for their song, "Digging It Out". After the release of Beyond the Machine, their song "Hated You From Hello" was used by WWE.

=== Radiocalypse (2012–2013) ===
Downplay released their fourth studio album, Radiocalypse, in May 2012. Their second music video, for the song "Where Did You Go", was released the following month. During this time, DeChant rejoined the band.

In July, Downplay announced that Connor was leaving the band to pursue other interests. On the day before the release of Downplay's second EP, The Human Condition, Connor died in a car accident. Later in the week, the band performed a tribute to Connor on 99.7 The Blitz.

In July 2013, Downplay announced on their website that they had "recently signed a licensing contract with NASCAR" allowing them to use over a dozen of their songs and that the band would be going on a short break and would likely go into the studio "sooner than later." On the following day, the band released an acoustic record, their debut compilation album, titled Stripped.

During an AMA on Reddit in August 2014, Bates revealed that he is still working on new music for Downplay, but has not received the "blessing" of the label to release it. By this time, he had released the album Transmissions with a new project, Starset, featuring Bates and bandmate Ron DeChant, which contained re-recorded versions of some of the songs that would have been on the scrapped album, Sleep.

On February 6, 2016, DeChant posted a band reunion photo of himself and Bates together with former members of Downplay, including Hill, Kiser, McKeever, Mealey and White.

In December 2019, Dustin shared his 2019 Spotify wrapped info-graph of Downplay with the caption "I should release some more of this."

In 2022, a new version of a Downplay song was released by Starset (featuring Breaking Benjamin) called “Waiting on the Sky to Change.” The song charted on Billboard, making the Top 20 for the Mainstream Rock chart.

== Band members ==
Current

- Dustin Bates – lead vocals, guitar (2001–present)
- Ron DeChant – bass, keyboards, backing vocals (2009–2010, 2012–present)
- Brian Patrick – drums, percussion (2009–present)

Past members

- George Andres – lead guitar (2001- 2003)
- Greg Huzyak – bass (2001-2003)
- Brandon Hill – drums (2003–2008)
- Nick Kiser – lead guitar (2003–2008)
- Chad White – bass (2003–2008)
- Mike Mealey – bass (2009–2010)
- Bobby Withers – lead guitar (2009–2010)
- Derek Snowden – rhythm guitar (2010)
- Brandon Zano – rhythm guitar (2010)
- Trevor Connor – lead guitar (2010–2012; died 2012)
- Corey Catlett – bass, backing vocals (2010–2012)
- Evan McKeever – rhythm guitar, backing vocals (2011–2012)

Timeline

== Discography ==
Albums

- Saturday (2005)
- A Day Without Gravity (2007)
- Beyond the Machine (2011)
- Radiocalypse (2012)

Compilations

- Stripped (2013)

EPs

- Rise. Fall. Repeat (2009)
- The Human Condition (2012)

Singles

- "Hated You From Hello" (2011)
- "Dark on Me" (2012)

Videos

- "Digging It Out" (2011)
- "Where Did You Go" (2012)
- "We"ll Be Kings" (2012)
- "Down With The Fallen" (2013)

== Notable appearances ==
- Rock on the Range 2011
- X-Fest 2011 in Dayton, Ohio
