= Brandon Zano =

- Also known as: Brandon Lozano
- Origin: Cleveland, Ohio, U.S.
- Genres: Rock, dance-rock, electronic rock, alt-psych rock, punk
- Occupations: Musician, singer, guitarist, record producer
- Instruments: Vocals, guitar, bass, drums
- Years active: 1997 to present
- Labels: Reversed Image Unlimited, Epic, OCDB Music
- Member of: Zaano, Ragers, it’s him or me.
- Formerly of: This Is a Shakedown!, Downplay, Leo, Dozen Dead Roses, Tender Blind Spot

Brandon Zano, also known as Brandon Lozano, is a musician, singer, guitarist and record producer originally from Cleveland, Ohio. He was in the Cleveland-based band This Is a Shakedown!, whose debut album Love Kills was released in 2009. In 2010 he played rhythm guitar in Downplay, and in 2011 he founded the hard rock band Ragers. He is now based in Los Angeles, where he records as Zaano and fronts the alt-psych rock band it's him or me. He also works as a producer for other artists.

== Career ==
=== Early bands ===
Zano first played with the Cleveland hard rock act Tender Blind Spot in 1997. Later, he joined Leo, which landed a development deal with Island Records and showcased in New York before the deal fell through. He then started Dozen Dead Roses, a band Cleveland Scene described as “AC/DC-meets-Guns N’ Roses,” drawing label interest before disbanding over creative differences.

=== This Is a Shakedown! ===
In 2008, Zano, Lee and Nicholson reworked Zano's solo material, and with keyboard player and programmer Justin Nyilas they formed This Is a Shakedown!, a playing electronics-driven dance-rock. The band's debut, Love Kills, was released on Reversed Image Unlimited in 2009, produced by Michael Seifert and mixed by Sean Beaven. The album was reviewed by Rad Bennett of SoundStage! Access who commended “Brandon Zano’s powerhouse vocals, which are recorded cleanly without sacrificing their raw power.”

=== Downplay and Ragers ===
In 2010, Zano played rhythm guitar in Downplay, the Ohio band fronted by Dustin Bates, during the period in which the band signed with Epic Records. Downplay went on hiatus in 2013, when Bates and bassist Ron DeChant turned their attention to a new project, Starset. Zano was not a member of Starset.

In December 2011, Zano founded the hard rock band Ragers, with lead guitarist Matt Jauch, drummer Stephen Nicholson and bassist Caitlin Dorney. The band's six-track debut, the Amnesia EP, followed in 2012. Ragers released no further music for 11 years before returning with the album Death Blow to the Thrones on July 21, 2023, produced by Zano and co-mixed by Ben Schigel, preceded by the single “Kill Your Politics.”

=== Solo work and move to Los Angeles ===
In 2015, Cleveland Scene’s Best Of Cleveland staff picks noted that Zano had launched a crowdfunding campaign for a solo debut. Zano later relocated to Los Angeles, and by 2023 production work had been his full-time occupation for years.

=== Zaano ===
Zaano’s first album under the name, Prequel, was released on November 28, 2017. Zano’s Hollywood-based project Zaano (stylized as ZAANO) released the single “It’s Gonna Be Ok.” in 2020. The single “I Do What I Want” followed in February 2022, featuring Lindsay Manfredi, the bassist of Cold. In an interview that year, Zano described producing and co-writing for other artists as his day job. The six-track EP Salton Sea followed on December 1, 2022, including a cover of “I Only Have Eyes for You”. Further Zaano singles followed, “You’re so cool” in 2023, “I’m On Fire” in 2024 and “Swans Nest” in 2025.

=== it’s him or me. ===
In 2024, Zano began releasing music as frontman of its him or me., an alt-psych rock band based in Los Angeles. (The band’s name is stylized in lowercase letters and features a period at the end.) The band released the singles “In Your Dreams” in 2024 and “Bones” in 2025, followed by “discordant” in 2026. Happy Mag featured “Ride” on its New Music Radar in September 2026, describing it as a moody rock and roll track. On November 3, 2026 it’s him or me. released their debut album City Of Zombies. It was reviewed positively by Havoc Underground, which said “the band knocked it out of the park here.” Chris Bound, writing for Mystic Sound, described it as a “record that moves between punk urgency, psychedelic haze and melodic alt-rock without sounding particularly interested in staying still.”

== Production work ==
Zano works as a producer and music engineer for other artists. He produced and engineered the self-titled album by Jesse Smith and the Holy Ghost. He also produced I Only Have a Hundred Years to Love You, the debut album by Moses Mikheyev, alongside David Gavrishov. The album took more than a decade to create.

== Discography ==
=== With This Is a Shakedown! ===
| Title | Year | Label |
|---|---|---|
| Love Kills | 2009 | Reversed Image Unlimited |

=== With Ragers ===
| Title | Type | Year |
|---|---|---|
| Amnesia EP | EP | 2012 |
| Death Blow to the Thrones | Album | 2023 |
| Trainwreck Town EP | EP | 2024 |

=== With Zaano ===
| Title | Year | Label |
|---|---|---|
| Prequel | 2017 | — |
| Prequel (Remixed) | 2019 | — |
| Salton Sea | 2022 | OCDB Music |

Singles:

- “You Don’t Know Me Like That” (2019)
- “It’s Gonna Be Ok.” (2020)
- “I Do What I Want” (2022)
- “Lonely Like The Salton Sea” (2022)
- “Keep Walkin” (2022)
- “You’re so cool” (2023)
- “I’m On Fire” (2024)
- “Swans Nest” (2025)

=== With it’s him or me. ===
| Title | Year | Label |
|---|---|---|
| City Of Zombies | 2026 | Independent |

Singles:

- “In Your Dreams” (2024)
- “Bones” (2025)
- “In Your Dreams (Acoustic)” (2025)
- “discordant” (2026)
- “Ride” (2026)

=== Production credits ===
| Artist | Title | Year | Role |
|---|---|---|---|
| Jesse Smith and the Holy Ghost | Jesse Smith and the Holy Ghost | 2016 | Producer and engineer |
| Moses Mikheyev | I Only Have a Hundred Years to Love You | 2025 | Producer (with David Gavrishov) |
