= Stevie Aiello =

American songwriter, musician, and record producer

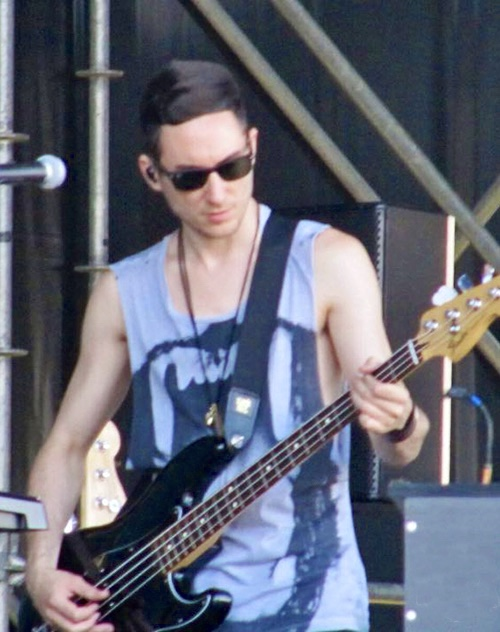
- Aiello performing in Rome in June 2014

Background information
- Born: Stephen Aiello; April 30, 1983 (age 42); Cranston, Rhode Island, United States
- Occupations: Songwriter; musician; record producer
- Instruments: Guitar; bass guitar; keyboards; vocals
- Years active: 1998–present
- Labels: Razor & Tie; Island
- Formerly of: Monty Are I
- Website: steviemusic.com

Stephen Aiello (born April 30, 1983) is an American songwriter, musician, and record producer. He is best known for touring and recording with American rock band Thirty Seconds to Mars. He was one of the founding members of Monty Are I, a band he formed in 1998 with some friends. Aiello has also worked with artists such as Mumford & Sons, Cheyenne Jackson, Lana Del Rey, Junkie XL, Young Guns, Cobra Starship, Every Avenue, Starset, and The Knocks, among others.

Aiello was nominated for two GMA Dove Awards for his work with Rapture Ruckus on the album Invader (2015). His list of work includes projects with recording acts like Sleeping with Sirens, Of Mice & Men, We Came as Romans, Anti-Flag, Blessthefall, Pop Evil, and Before Their Eyes.

== Early life ==
Stevie Aiello was born April 30, 1983, in Cranston, Rhode Island. His family has Italian origins; his great-grandparents moved from Serrastretta to United States in the early 20th-century. Aiello attended the Cranston High School West and then enrolled at the University of Rhode Island in Kingston. While he was a student there, he started writing music and playing in a number of rock and metal bands. His influences include artists as varied as Underoath, Metallica, Josh Groban, Hans Zimmer, and Michael Jackson.

== Music career ==
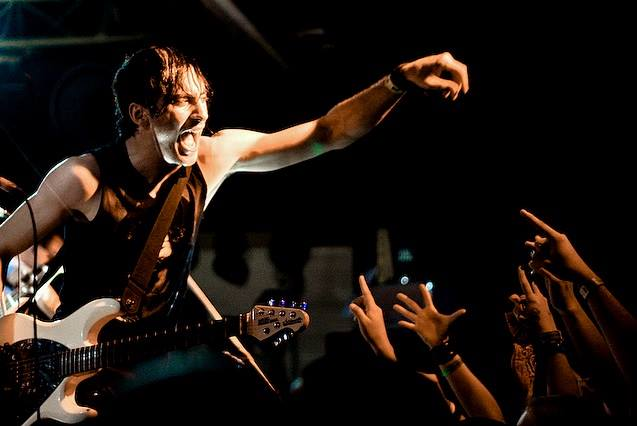
Aiello performing with Monty Are I

Aiello founded Monty Are I in 1998 with guitarist Ryan Muir, keyboardist Andrew Borstein, bassist Mike Matarese, and drummer Justin Muir. Aiello was the lead singer of the band and played rhythm guitar. After winning Ernie Ball's Battle of the Bands in 2003, Monty Are I signed to Stolen Transmission, an imprint of Island Records.

Monty Are I went on to play Warped Tour and shared the stage with bands like Anberlin, My Chemical Romance, Taking Back Sunday, Yellowcard, Hawthorne Heights and The Red Jumpsuit Apparatus. Aiello recorded the albums Wall of People (2006) and Break Through the Silence (2009) as frontman and composer of Monty Are I. He later joined music publishing company Razor & Tie as songwriter and record producer. During this period, he worked with Ben Lovett from Mumford & Sons, Cheyenne Jackson, Lana Del Rey, Junkie XL, Alex Suarez from Cobra Starship, Every Avenue, and The Knocks.

Aiello collaborated with Before Their Eyes on the albums Untouchable (2010) and Redemption (2012) alongside producer Joey Sturgis. In early 2013, He moved to Los Angeles where he started working with Thirty Seconds to Mars after former touring member Tim Kelleher left the band to work on his own music. Aiello is playing bass guitar, keyboards and occasionally rhythm guitar. He later began to take part at recording sessions with the band. In 2014, Aiello joined producer Rob Graves to work with Starset on the album Transmissions (2014), and again in 2019 for Starset's third studio album, Divisions.

He worked with Crown the Empire on the albums The Resistance: Rise of the Runaways (2014) and Retrograde (2016). His work with Rapture Ruckus on their fifth album Invader (2015) earned him two nominations at the GMA Dove Awards in the categories of Rock/Contemporary Album of the Year and Rap/Hip Hop Song of the Year. Aiello rejoined Joey Sturgis to work with Blessthefall on their fifth album To Those Left Behind (2015). He later worked on the records Echoes (2016) by Young Guns and Gossip (2017) by Sleeping with Sirens.

In 2018 he started a side project called CNTRLLR and on 19 October of the same year he released a new version of "Stuck" by The Aces on Spotify and YouTube. On April 26, 2019 he released a new song called "Endgame".

== Discography ==
Year	Artist	Album	Label	Songs
2020	The Score	-	Republic Records	Best Part
2020	Anti-Flag	20/20 Vision	Spinefarm Records UK	The Disease - Un-American
2019	Natalia Nykel	Origo EP	Universal Music Polska Sp.	Wanna Go Back
2019	League of Legends ft. Chrissy Costanza - Cailin Russo	Phoenix	Sony/ATV Music Publishing LLC	Phoenix
2019	Arrested Youth	-	Lowly	What You're Made Of
2019	Starset	Divisions	Fearless Records	Waking Up - Faultline
2019	Dreamers	Launch Fly Land	Fairfax Recordings	Celebrate
2018	WWE Music Group	Flight Of The Valkyries (Daniel Bryan)	Columbia Records	Flight Of The Valkyries
2018	Thrillchaser	A Lot Like Love	Thrillchaser	Hold on to the Night - Out of Our Minds
2018	Of Mice & Men	Defy	Rise Records	How Will You Live - Back To Me
2018	No Sleep For Lucy	Until The End	Lucy Records	Don't Let Go
2018	Escape The Fate	I Am Human	Eleven Seven Music	Four Letter Word
2018	Diamante	Volume I	Time Records	Bulletproof
2018	Thirty Seconds to Mars	America	Interscope	Walk On Water - Dangerous Night - Dangerous Night
2017	Sleeping With Sirens	Gossip	Warner Bros	Legends - Trouble - Hole In My Heart - Empire To Ashes
2017	Sainte	Smile and Wave	Good Problems	Lighthouse
2017	Motionless In White	Graveyard Shift	Roadrunner Records	Queen For Queen - Untouchable
2017	Hanazuki ft. Cosmos & Creature	Beautiful Life	Legacy Recordings	Beautiful Life
2017	Fernando Varela	Vivere	Panorama	I Believe In You
2017	Falling In Reverse	Coming Home	Epitaph	Superhero
2017	Echo Black	Dawn	Echo Black	Poison Apple
2017	Anti-Flag	American Fall	Spinefarm Records US	American Attraction - Throw It Away
2016	Young Guns	Echoes	Wind-up Records	Mad World
2016	Out Came The Wolves	Strange Fate	Roadrunner Records	Bleed - The Curse
2016	James Durbin	Riot On Sunset	Wild Vine Records	We Are The Unknown
2016	I Prevail	Lifelines	Fearless	One More Time - Stuck In Your Head
2016	Crown The Empire	Retrograde	Rise Records	Oxygen
2016	Bad Seed Rising	Awake In Color	Roadrunner Records	Horizon
2016	As Lions	Selfish Age	Eleven Seven Music	Pieces
2016	American Wolves	Part Of Me	American Wolves	Part Of Me
2016	Alive In Barcelona	Alive in Barcelona	Smartpunk Records	Back To Life
2016	Against The Current	In Our Bones	Fueled By Ramen/Atla	Brighter - Forget Me Now - Roses
2015	We Came as Romans	We Came As Romans	Equal Vision/Spinefarm/Caroline Australia	Flatline - Memories - The World I Used To Know
2015	Soysauce ft. Stalking Gia	Lunch Money	ASCAP	Talking To Myself
2015	Sleeping Wolf	The Dark	Sleeping Wolf Music	BlindFold
2015	Gentlemen Roosevelt	Here EP	Roosevelt Records	Here
2015	Conquer Divide	Conquer Divide	Artery Recordings	Nightmares
2015	Breathe Carolina feat. Karra	Platinum Hearts	Armada Trice	Platinum Hearts
2015	Blessthefall	To Those Left Behind	Fearless Records	Condition//Comatose - Up In Flames
2015	Against The Current	Gravity	Warner Music Japan	Brighter - Fireproof - Paralyzed
2014	Crown The Empire	The Resistance	Rise Records	Cross Our Bones
2014	Starset	Transmission	Razor & Tie	My Demons
2014	James Durbin	Celebrate	Wind-up Records	Louder Than A Loaded Gun
2014	Heartist	Feeding Fiction	The All Blacks U.S.A., Inc.	Skeletons - Unbreakable
2014	Dan Sultan	Blackbird	Liberation Records	Loving's Just For Fools
2014	Charming Liars	We Won't Give Up	Riot	My Kind Of Crazy
2014	Black Veil Brides	Black Veil Brides	Lava Records/Universal Republic Records	Shattered God
2013	William Beckett	Genuine & Counterfeit	Equal Vision Records	Cracks in the Ceiling
2013	Love and Death	Between Here & Lost	Tooth & Nail Records	Meltdown
2013	Cheyenne Jackson	I'm Blue, Skies	Shiny Boy Music LLC	Before You - She's Pretty, She Lies - I'm Blue, Skies - Drive - Don't Wanna Know
2012	Shaun Lopez - Spacebrother	The Antidote	-	The Antidote
2012	Sovereign Soldiers	Born Again	Sovereign Soldiers	Goodbye To Yesterday - Unstoppable
2012	Hollywood Ending	Always 18	Hollywood Ending	She's All That
2012	Before Their Eyes	Redemption	InVogue Records	Alive - Find - Lies - Faith
2011	We Are the In Crowd	Best Intentions	Hopeless Records	On Your Own
2011	Pop Evil	War of Angels	eOne Music	Daisy Chain
2011	Amely	The Raleigh Sessions	Amely Independent Records	Never Gonna Let Go
2010	Before Their Eyes	Untouchable	Rise Records	Entire Album
2010	Amely	Hello World	Fearless Records	Come Back - Sing To You
