= Horizons (Starset album) =

Studio album by Starset
- Released: October 22, 2021
- Recorded: 2020–2021
- Genre: Hard rock; alternative metal
- Length: 70:57
- Label: Fearless
- Producer: Dustin Bates; Joe Rickard

Starset chronology
Divisions (2019)	Horizons (2021)	Silos (2025)

Singles from Horizons
- 1. "Infected" Released: April 26, 2021; 2. "The Breach" Released: September 10, 2022; 3. "Leaving This World Behind" Released: September 23, 2022; 4. "Earthrise" Released: October 7, 2022

Horizons is the fourth studio album by American rock band Starset. It was released on October 22, 2021.

== Critical reception ==
Professional ratings
Review scores
Source	Rating
Distorted Sound	7/10
Kerrang!	4/5
Sonic Perspectives	8.9/10
Wall of Sound	8.5/10
Sputnikmusic	4.5/5

Horizons has received positive reviews. Sonic Perspectives's Josh Muncke wrote, "Horizons is truly a step forward for Starset, and arguably a demonstration of them at their best. They've taken their past releases and distilled them all into an optimised collection of tracks, whilst introducing some new ideas to continue the concept narrative."

Wall of Sound lauded the album, singling out the tracks "Otherworldly", "Icarus", and "Symbiotic" as highlights. Writing for Kerrang!, Steve Beebee opined that "the galactic sense of scale in Horizons' orchestration enables all sixteen tracks to massage the emotions" and praised Starset for "explor[ing] our vulnerability, our very humanity".

== Track listing ==
All tracks are written by Dustin Bates, with additional writers where noted.

Horizons track listing
No.	Title	Writer(s)	Length
1.	"Unveiling the Architecture"	Paul Trust	1:45
2.	"The Breach"	Garrison Turner; Joe Rickard	4:20
3.	"Otherworldly"	Sahaj Ticotin	5:02
4.	"Icarus"	Trust; Rickard	4:48
5.	"Earthrise"	Trust; Rickard	4:56
6.	"Leaving This World Behind"	Turner	4:27
7.	"Devolution"	Trust; Rickard; Stacy Hogan	5:09
8.	"Annihilated Love"	Ticotin; Johnny Andrews	4:44
9.	"Alchemy"	Erik Ron; Rickard	5:19
10.	"Disappear"	Trust; Rickard	5:53
11.	"This Endless Endeavor"	Ricky Armellino; Rickard	5:02
12.	"Symbiotic"	Stephen Aiello	3:23
13.	"Dreamcatcher"	Turner; Rickard	4:53
14.	"Tunnelvision"	Aiello	4:09
15.	"Infected"	Andrews	3:08
16.	"Something Wicked"	Rob Graves; Rickard	3:59
Total length:			70:57

== Personnel ==
Musicians

- Dustin Bates – lead vocals
- Jasen Rauch – guitar, bass guitar
- Isaiah Perez – drums
- Lester Estelle – drums on "Disappear" and "Infected"
- Joe Rickard, Alex Niceforo – programming
- Garrison Turner – additional programming on "The Breach", "Dreamcatcher" and "This Endless Endeavor"
- Paul Trust – additional programming on "Devolution", "Earthrise" and "Icarus"
- Sahaj Ticotin – additional programming on "Otherworldly" and "Annihiliated Love"
- Igor Khoroshev – additional programming on "Infected"
- David Davidson, Conni Ellisor, David Angell, Carrie Bailey, Elizabeth Lamb – violins
- Seanad Chang – viola
- Paul Nelson – cello

Production

- Joe Rickard – producer, engineer
- Dustin Bates – executive producer
- Jasen Rauch – drum engineering
- Patrick Prophet – drum assistant engineer
- Dan Lancaster – mixing
- Niels Nielsen – mastering
- Alex Niceforo – programming
- Mike "Cowboy" Warren – guitar technician
- Taylor Pollert, Josh Keith – engineers
- Paul Trust – string arrangement and interludes
- Paul Nelson, Steve Mauldin – transcriptions and score preparation

Artwork

- TNSN DVSN – art direction and package design
- Jake Wangner – cover photo

== Charts ==
Chart performance for Horizons
Chart (2021)	Peak positions
UK Digital Albums (OCC)	22
UK Rock & Metal Albums (OCC)	28
US Top Album Sales (Billboard)	27
US Top Current Album Sales (Billboard)	23
US Top Alternative Albums (Billboard)	22
US Independent Albums (Billboard)	32
US Top Rock Albums (Billboard)	38
US Top Hard Rock Albums (Billboard)	10
