= Invader (Rapture Ruckus album) =

Studio album by Rapture Ruckus
- Released: 7 April 2015
- Genres: Christian hip hop, rap rock, synthpop
- Length: 58:50
- Label: BEC

Rapture Ruckus chronology
Invader Volume 2 (2015)	Invader (2015)

Invader is the fifth studio album by Rapture Ruckus. BEC Recordings released the album on 7 April 2015. The album was produced by Brad Dring and long time collaborator Geoff Duncan.

== Critical reception ==
Professional ratings
Review scores
Source	Rating
Jesus Freak Hideout	4/5 stars
New Release Tuesday	4.5/5 stars

Signaling in a four star review by Jesus Freak Hideout, Christopher Smith describes, "Fusing these two EPs together and throwing them into a volcano may sound like a hot mess, but the result works surprisingly well." Sarah Fine, indicating in a four and a half star review from New Release Tuesday, replies, "This group runs the gamut melodically, and Invader is a fine example of that."

== Track listing ==
Invader track listing
No.	Title	Writer(s)	Length
1.	"In Crowd"	Brad Dring, Geoff Duncan, Solomon Olds	3:15
2.	"Volcano" (featuring Jonathan Thulin)	Dring, Jonathan Thulin	3:40
3.	"Everybody Get Up"	Dring, Duncan	3:55
4.	"Head Held High"	Steve Aiello, T. Brown, Dring	3:09
5.	"Invader Part I"		1:57
6.	"Carry Me" (featuring David Dunn)	Dring, David Dunn	4:18
7.	"In This Together" (featuring Shuree)	Dring, Duncan	2:55
8.	"Fire to the Night"	Dring	2:56
9.	"Boomerang"	Dring	2:54
10.	"Mr Roboto"	Dring, Duncan	3:22
11.	"Mindfield"	Dring	2:59
12.	"Parallax"	Dring, Duncan	3:27
13.	"In Crowd" (David Thulin Remix)	Dring, Duncan, Olds	3:28
14.	"Volcano" (featuring Jonathan Thulin; Matthew Parker Remix)	Dring, Thulin	4:15
15.	"Fire to the Night" (David Thulin Remix)	Dring	5:17
16.	"Mr Roboto" (Grapishsoda Remix)	Dring, Duncan	3:14
17.	"Parallax" (Unikron Remix)	Dring, Duncan	3:49
Total length:			58:50

== Charts ==
Chart performance for Invader
Chart (2015)	Peak position
US Billboard 200	125
US Top Alternative Albums (Billboard)	15
US Top Christian Albums (Billboard)	1
US Independent Albums (Billboard)	9
