= Monster (Starset song) =

Single by Starset

from the album Vessels
- Released: October 28, 2016
- Recorded: 2016
- Genre: Hard rock; electronic rock
- Length: 4:16
- Label: Razor & Tie
- Songwriter: Dustin Bates
- Producer: Rob Graves

Starset singles chronology
"Halo" (2015)	"Monster" (2016)	"Satellite" (2017)

Music video
- "Monster" on YouTube

"Monster" is a single by American rock band Starset, off of their studio album Vessels. It peaked at number 2 on the Billboard Mainstream Rock Songs chart in May 2017, and was the number two song at US Mainstream Rock radio of the year.

== Background ==
"Monster" was released on October 28, 2016, as the lead single from Starset's second studio album, Vessels. It was debuted on Octane (Sirius XM) and YouTube, where it accumulated over 450,000 views in the first week, and over 600,000 views in less than two weeks. In May 2017, the song peaked at number 2 on the Billboard Mainstream Rock Songs chart, and in August 2017, Loudwire reported that the song was the second most popular rock song at Modern Rock Radio in the US at the time.

== Themes and composition ==
Both of Starset's studio albums, Transmissions and Vessels, are concept albums centered around the "Starset Society", a fictional group investigating the positive and negative effects of science and technology on society. Specifically, Bates describes Vessels as a story about a "dark dystopian" journey related to this investigation. He explained where "Monster" falls into the story:

I guess somewhere in later act two, if there were three acts like a play or a movie. It’s sort of post transformation… Just before that in the record, there’s sort of an inescapable descent into darkness and Monster is the acknowledgment of that, becoming something you probably didn’t want to become and becoming aware of it, and maybe overcoming it.

Bates also explained that lyrically, the song was inspired by feelings of being "bastardized into someone else's monster" while working in the music industry. Musically, Bates aimed to "[blend] some of the structural elements and textures of EDM into the hard rock and cinematic elements of the last record [Transmissions]". Loudwire described the song as being "a slower-paced track with a steady beat, led by Bates’ emotionally raw vocals".

== Music video ==
The first teaser video released for the single shows a grandfather clock in a barren field on a dark and cloudy day. Moving hands on the clock appear in glitches, then the scene cuts to a brighter day with the face of the clock empty. The second teaser continues the scene and jumps to the former with fires burning in the distance. Then it cuts to a dark hooded figure with static where its face should be. In the audio video, the figure stands in the field and moves whenever the scene glitches.

This character is shown again in the music video, staring at triangular objects floating in the sky in the beginning. The figure is revealed to have noticeable facial features on its static face. It walks around a city and finds that everybody has a colorful headset that renders them controlled or immobile. The people are seeing memories of their daily activities in a colorful landscape through the headset. When the figure passes a woman that notices it, it follows her to her apartment where it removes her headset. She gets terrified and tries to get away, but she's too shocked at reality and calms down. The figure shows her the objects in the sky and everybody immobilized by their headsets. It shows her a hologram of the earth being destroyed and takes her hand to leave the city. At the end, the destruction of the city begins and the objects in the sky start to float away.

== Reception ==
The song was named the third best hard rock song of 2017 by online magazine Loudwire.

== Personnel ==
- Dustin Bates – lead vocals, keyboard
- Brock Richards – lead guitar
- Ron DeChant – bass
- Adam Gilbert – drums

== Charts ==
=== Weekly charts ===
Weekly chart performance for "Monster"
Chart (2016–2017)	Peak position
US Hot Rock & Alternative Songs (Billboard)	27
US Mainstream Rock Airplay (Billboard)	2
US Rock & Alternative Airplay (Billboard)	14

=== Year-end charts ===
Year-end chart performance for "Monster"
Chart (2017)	Position
US Hot Rock Songs (Billboard)	84
