= Monty Are I =

American rock band

- Monty Are I performing a live show in 2009.

Background information
- Also known as: Monty's Fan Club, Monty
- Origin: Cranston, Rhode Island, U.S.
- Genres: Alternative rock Symphonic rock Post-hardcore; Ska punk (early)
- Years active: 1998–2011; 2019–present
- Label: Island Records
- Members: Stevie Aiello; Justin Muir; Ryan Muir; Andrew Borstein
- Past members: Greg Johnson; Nick Salisbury; Greg DeSantis; Mike Matarese
- Website: facebook.com/montyarei

Monty Are I (formerly known as Monty's Fan Club and Monty) is an American rock band from Cranston, Rhode Island. The band is named after the groups’s former music instructor, Arthur Montanaro. The "Are I" portion of the name is a pun on "RI", Rhode Island's postal abbreviation.

== History and achievements ==
Monty Are I won Takeover Records' "Sign My Band" contest on MySpace in 2005. They also won the WBRU "Rock Hunt" in 2002 and the Ernie Ball sponsored "Battle of the Bands" in 2003. The group signed to Stolen Transmission, and were upstreamed to Island Records.

Monty has many national tours under their belt, including five years on Vans Warped Tour, and tours with Just Surrender, Secondhand Serenade, Amber Pacific, Anberlin, Powerspace, Rx Bandits, My Chemical Romance, Story of the Year, Sum41, Taking Back Sunday, Yellowcard, Hawthorne Heights and The Red Jumpsuit Apparatus.

Monty Are I's song "In This Legacy" is featured in the Xbox/PS2 games: ATV Offroad Fury 4 and Tony Hawk's Project 8.

Their first album exclusively under Island/DefJam is titled Break Through The Silence and was released on September 22, 2009. "One in a Million" was the first single, released on August 25, 2009.

The song "One in a Million" was used in the Road to WrestleMania trailer from the 2010 video game WWE SmackDown vs. Raw 2011

As of 2017, new plans for the recording of any new Monty Are I material are put on hold as lead vocalist/guitarist Aiello is touring with Thirty Seconds to Mars in support of the 2013 album, Love, Lust, Faith and Dreams, contributing bass and keyboards to their live performances.

2019 Reunion

On October 16, 2019, the band posted to their Instagram page the date "01.04.20" and announced their plans for a reunion show at The Met in Pawtucket for that date. Less than 48 hours later, the show sold out. The show was then moved to The Strand.

On December 6 via the band's Instagram, a new song was announced called "In My Mind."

== Discography ==
=== EP's ===
- Thanks for the Metal Sign (2000)
- Monty's Fan Club EP (2002)
- The Red Shift (2005)

=== Albums ===
- Wall of People (2006, Stolen Transmission/Island Records)
- Break Through the Silence (2009, Island Records)

=== Singles ===
- "C-3P0 is Melting" (1999)
- "Dublin Waltz" (2006)
- "Between The Sheets" (2007)
- "One in a Million" (2009)
- "In My Mind" (2019)

== Members ==
- Stevie Aiello – Lead vocals, guitar
- Ryan Muir – Guitar, vocals, trumpet
- Andrew Borstein – Keyboards, trombone, vocals
- Mike Matarese - Bass guitar
- Justin Muir – Drums
