= Silos (Starset album) =

Studio album by Starset
- Released: September 12, 2025
- Length: 57:17
- Label: Fearless
- Producer: Joe Rickard

Starset chronology
Horizons (2021)	Silos (2025)

Singles from Silos
- 1. "Brave New World" Released: May 3, 2024; 2. "Degenerate" Released: July 5, 2024; 3. "Toksik" Released: August 16, 2024; 4. "Dystopia" Released: November 8, 2024; 5. "Dark Things" Released: February 28, 2025; 6. "Head Over Heels" Released: May 2, 2025; 7. "Silos" Released: June 27, 2025; 8. "Shattered Dreams" Released: August 29, 2025

Professional ratings
Review scores
Source	Rating
Kerrang!	4/5

Silos is the fifth studio album by the American rock band Starset. It was released on September 12, 2025, by Fearless Records.

== Background ==
Unlike Starset's previous albums, Silos is largely a compilation of stand-alone songs that were released as singles throughout 2024 and 2025, originally intended as part of a potential extended play. Vocalist and songwriter Dustin Bates decided to combine these singles into a full album, adding some extra songs and several cinematic interludes to establish a unifying narrative for the individual songs that ties into the science fiction universe the band's music has traditionally been part of. This is also Starset's first studio album to feature a title track, as well as covered songs that are part of the standard album's track listing.

== Track listing ==
All tracks are written by Dustin Bates except where noted.

Silos track listing
No.	Title	Writer(s)	Length
1.	"Praesens"		2:00
2.	"Degenerate"	Bates; Evan McKeever; Cameron Mizell	3:36
3.	"Silos"	Bates; Joe Rickard; Sahaj Ticotin	4:20
4.	"Rise of Messenger"		2:14
5.	"Dark Things"	Bates; Rickard	4:40
6.	"Shattered Dreams"	Clark Datchler	4:09
7.	"Temple of Milton"		2:07
8.	"Brave New World"	Bates; McKeever; Mizell	4:23
9.	"Dystopia"	Bates; Johnny Andrews; Erik Jensen; Rickard	4:37
10.	"Head over Heels"	Roland Orzabal; Curt Smith	4:58
11.	"Sway"	Bates; Ticotin	4:17
12.	"The Antihero's Journey"		1:44
13.	"Toksik"	Bates; Andrews	3:51
14.	"At His Altar"		1:40
15.	"Ad Astra"	Bates; Ticotin	4:35
16.	"Requiem of the Order"		3:56
Total length:			57:17

=== Notes ===
- Tracks 1, 4, 7, 12, 14 & 16 are instrumental and are stylized in lower case
- All other tracks are stylized in upper case
- "Shattered Dreams" is a cover of the Johnny Hates Jazz song.
- "Head over Heels" is a cover of the Tears for Fears song.

== Personnel ==
Credits adapted from Tidal.

=== Starset ===
- Dustin Bates – vocals (all tracks), guitar (tracks 8, 9, 11, 13), production (8)
- Ron DeChant – background vocals (9, 10)
- Zuzana Engererova – cello (8, 9), additional vocals (9)
- Adam Gilbert – additional vocals (9)
- Cory Juba – additional vocals (9), background vocals (10)
- Brock Richards – additional vocals (9), background vocals (10)
- Siobhán Richards – violin (8, 9), additional vocals (9)

=== Additional contributors ===
- Joe Rickard – production, engineering (all tracks); mixing (1, 2, 4, 6, 7, 10–12, 14–16), programming (2, 3, 5, 6, 8–11, 13, 15), drums (6, 11, 15)
- Ted Jensen – mastering (1, 2, 4, 5, 7, 9, 10, 12–14, 16)
- Paul DeCarli – digital editing (2, 3, 5, 8–11, 13, 15)
- Erik Jensen – guitar (2, 5, 9–11, 15), programming (5, 10, 11, 15), bass guitar (5), additional vocals (9)
- Cameron Mizell – programming (2, 8, 13)
- Evan McKeever – programming (2, 8), guitar (8, 13)
- Jay Wud – programming (2, 9, 13)
- Zakk Cervini – mixing (3, 5, 8, 9, 13), mastering (8)
- Howie Weinberg – mastering (3, 6, 11, 15)
- Phil Sgrosso – guitar (3, 6)
- Ian Thunder – programming (3)
- James Guttmann – programming (3, 5, 6, 10, 11)
- Ray Garrison – programming (3, 5, 9, 13)
- Sahaj Ticotin – programming (3), background vocals (6)
- Mark Kouznetsov – programming (8–10, 15), string arrangement (9); piano, strings (10)

== Charts ==
Chart performance for Silos
Chart (2025–2026)	Peak position
US Vinyl Albums (Billboard)	16
French Rock & Metal Albums (SNEP)	71
UK Album Downloads (Official Charts)	52
US Top Album Sales (Billboard)	18
