= My Demons =

Single by Starset

from the album Transmissions
- Released: October 24, 2013
- Recorded: 2013
- Genre: Alternative rock; hard rock; electronic rock
- Length: 4:48
- Label: Razor & Tie
- Songwriters: Stevie Aiello; Dustin Bates; Rob Graves
- Producer: Rob Graves

Starset singles chronology
| "My Demons" (2013) | "Carnivore" (2014) |

Music video
- "My Demons" on YouTube

"My Demons" is a single by American rock band Starset, the first off of their debut studio album Transmissions. Initially released in 2013, it peaked at number 5 on the Billboard Mainstream Rock Songs chart in 2014.

== Composition and themes ==
The song has been described as an edgy, hard rock song with "boisterous" guitar and bass and a "catchy chorus". AllMusic described the song as having "dramatic style...electronic elements, strings, heavy alternative rock, and more mysterious samples than an entire season of X-Files." Converse to its layered and complicated studio composition, the band sometimes plays a stripped down acoustic version of the song live as well.

Frontman Dustin Bates described the song's lyrical premise as "downtrodden protagonist superhero gains power from love interest", similar to something seen as in the 2008 and onward Iron Man films between Tony Stark and Pepper Potts. Conversely, the song's music video was inspired and influenced by an account Bates had read on Nikola Tesla, in which Tesla states he encountered an extraterrestrial signal in 1901. It was directed by Denver Cavins.

== Reception ==
Commercially, the song peaked at number 5 on the Billboard US Mainstream Rock Songs chart in 2014. The song also spent 41 weeks on the chart, more than any other song on the chart that year, or in the chart's history, dating back to its beginning in 1981. The song had accumulated over 73,000 downloads as of September 2014. Outside of the traditional music charts, Billboard magazine also specifically noted its strong performance on music streaming websites. The song was an especially successful song on YouTube, with the track receiving 285.4 million views between September 2014 and November 2016. For context, Billboard noted that the most viewed videos of two other extremely popular modern rock bands, "Uprising" by Muse and "The Pretender" by the Foo Fighters, only had 81 million and 143 million views, respectively. The song's performance on Spotify was also noted, with it receiving over 30 million streams as of April 2017.

== Personnel ==
- Dustin Bates – lead vocals, rhythm guitar
- Brock Richards – lead guitar
- Ron DeChant – bass
- Adam Gilbert – drums

== Charts ==
=== Weekly charts ===
Weekly chart performance for "My Demons"
| Chart (2014) | Peak position |
|---|---|
| US Hot Rock & Alternative Songs (Billboard) | 36 |
| US Mainstream Rock Airplay (Billboard) | 5 |
| US Rock & Alternative Airplay (Billboard) | 26 |

=== Year-end charts ===
Year-end chart performance for "My Demons"
| Chart (2014) | Position |
|---|---|
| US Hot Rock & Alternative Songs (Billboard) | 99 |

== Certifications ==
Certifications for "My Demons"
| Region | Certification | Certified units/sales |
|---|---|---|
| Brazil (Pro-Música Brasil) | Gold | 30,000^{‡} |
| Canada (Music Canada) | Gold | 40,000^{‡} |
| New Zealand (RMNZ) | Gold | 15,000^{‡} |
| United Kingdom (BPI) | Silver | 200,000^{‡} |
| United States (RIAA) | Platinum | 1,000,000^{‡} |
^{‡} Sales+streaming figures based on certification alone.
