= Divisions (album) =

2019 studio album by Starset

Studio album by Starset
- Released: September 13, 2019
- Recorded: 2019
- Genres: Hard rock; post-hardcore
- Length: 58:25
- Label: Fearless
- Producers: Dustin Bates; Joe Rickard; Nick Chiari

Starset chronology
Vessels (2017)	Divisions (2019)	Horizons (2021)

Singles from Divisions
- 1. "Manifest" Released: August 15, 2019; 2. "Trials" Released: April 7, 2020

Divisions is the third studio album by American rock band Starset. It was released on September 13, 2019. It spawned two singles "Manifest" and "Trials", which peaked at number 14 and 8 respectively on the Billboard Mainstream Rock chart. Loudwire named it one of the 50 best rock albums of 2019.

== Background and concept ==
Plans for a third studio album were revealed as early as January 2018, though frontman Dustin Bates stated its release would be far in the future, as he was taking a break from Starset to release a side-project electronic album under the moniker of "MNQN". Talks of a third album arose again in August 2018, upon the band's announcement of the re-release of their second album, Vessels, as Vessels 2.0. Shortly after the April 2019 release of MNQN material, in May 2019, the band announced that the third album was scheduled for release on September 13, 2019. The album's title, Divisions, was announced on August 15, 2019. The album's first single, "Manifest", was released the same day, alongside its music video. The album is the first to feature session drummer Luke Holland.

Much like the band's prior two albums, the album conceptually refers to frontman Dustin Bates' fictional story about a dystopian future struggling with the misuse of technology. The music video for "Manifest" established the setting of New West, where denizens of a work camp are mind controlled into compliance through technology embedded into their heads, while others start to stage a rebellion. Three other songs, "Where the Skies End", "Diving Bell", and "Stratosphere" were released in the leadup to the album, with accompanying music videos featuring citizens from various socioeconomic backgrounds affected by the mind control technology.

== Track listing ==
All tracks are written by Dustin Bates, with additional writers where noted.

No.	Title	Writer(s)	Length
1.	"A Brief History of the Future"	Paul Trust	1:37
2.	"Manifest"	Daniel Ticotin; Garrison Turner	4:27
3.	"Echo"	Ticotin; Turner; Stacy Hogan	3:36
4.	"Where the Skies End"	Trust	6:33
5.	"Perfect Machine"	Trust	5:23
6.	"Telekinetic"	Joe Rickard	5:12
7.	"Stratosphere"	Rickard	4:17
8.	"Faultline"	Stevie Aiello	3:36
9.	"Solstice"	Trust	5:41
10.	"Trials"	Johnny Lee Andrews	4:18
11.	"Waking Up"	Aiello	3:49
12.	"Other Worlds Than These"	Rickard; Lucio Rubino	4:18
13.	"Diving Bell"	Rickard	5:38
Total length:			58:25

Notes

- All track titles are stylized in all caps.

== Personnel ==
Musicians

- Dustin Bates – vocals, backing vocals, production
- Joe Rickard – programming; drums (track 12)
- Alex Niceford – programming
- Igor Khoroshev – additional programming
- Niels Nielsen – additional programming
- Paul Trust – additional programming, interlude music
- Randy Torres – interlude sound design
- Ron DeChant – backing vocals
- Brock Richards – backing vocals
- JR Bareis – guitars
- Lucio Rubino – bass; guitars (track 12)
- Luke Holland – drums
- David Davidson – strings arrangement and violin (all except tracks 7 and 12)
- Conni Ellisor – violin (all except tracks 7 and 12)
- Karen Winkelmann – violin (all except tracks 7 and 12)
- Janet Darnall – violin (all except tracks 7 and 12)
- Betsy Lamb – viola (all except tracks 7 and 12)
- Simona Russo – viola (all except tracks 7 and 12)
- Carole Rabinowitz – cello (all except tracks 7 and 12)
- Sari Reist – cello (all except tracks 7 and 12)

Technical

- Dustin Bates – production
- Joe Rickard – co-production (track 2), engineering, digital editing, guitars engineering
- Nick Chiari – co-production (track 11)
- Dan Lancaster – mixing
- Rhys May – mixing assistance
- Paul Decarli – digital editing
- Taylor Pollert – string recording
- Dave Schiffman – drums engineering
- Mike Plotnikoff – guitars engineering
- Michael Closson III – assistant engineering
- Niels Nielsen – mastering
- Tnsn Dvsn – creative direction, album art and package

== Charts ==
Chart performance for Divisions
Chart (2019)	Peak position
Australian Digital Albums (ARIA)	22
Scottish Albums (Official Charts)	78
UK Album Sales (OCC)	70
UK Digital Albums (OCC)	29
UK Rock & Metal Albums (OCC)	8
US Billboard 200	37
US Top Hard Rock Albums (Billboard)	4
US Top Alternative Albums (Billboard)	6
US Top Rock Albums (Billboard)	7
