= Palmerfest =

Annual block party in Athens, Ohio

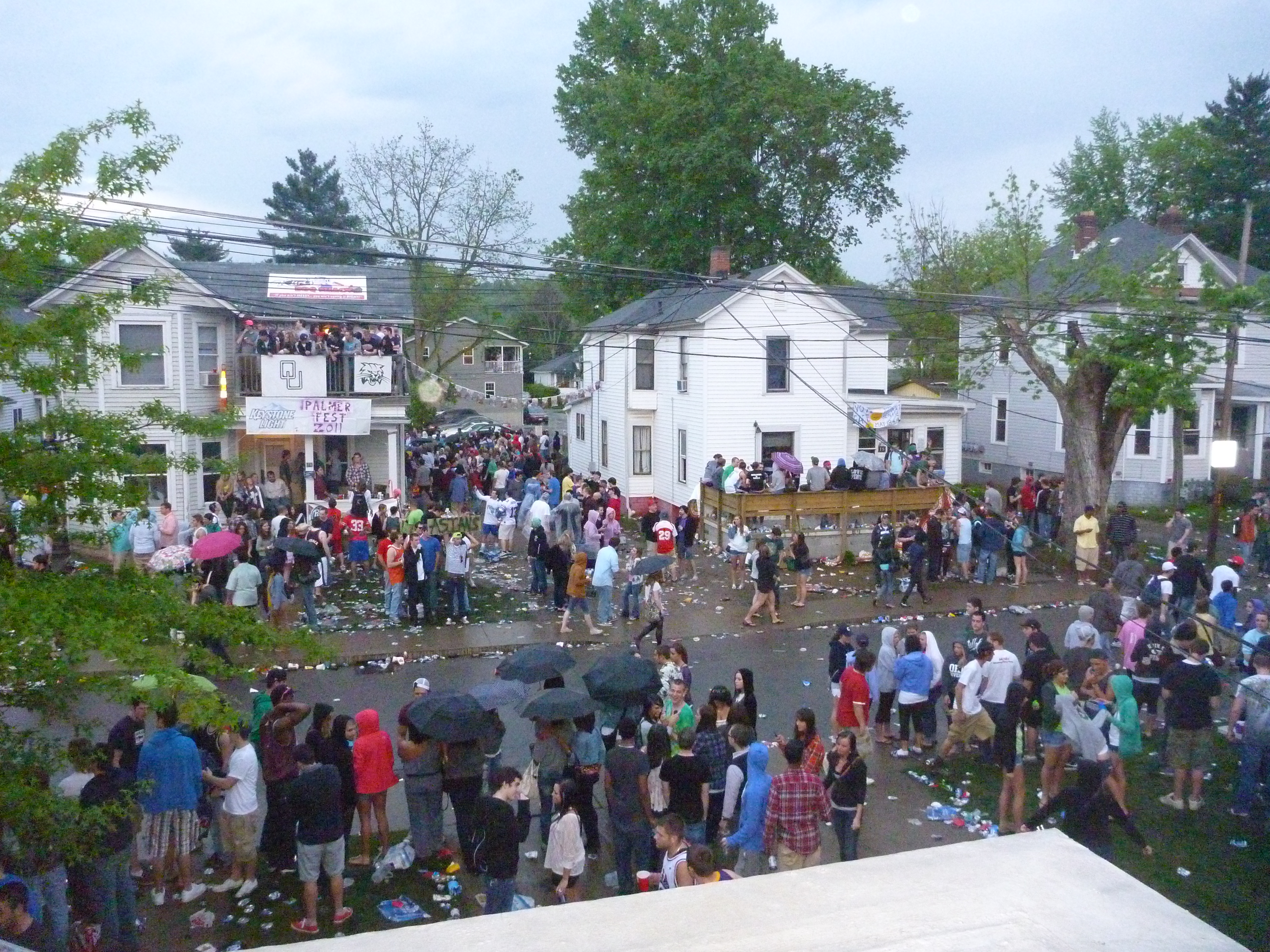
- Students gather along the street at the 2011 Palmerfest
- Date: April annually
- Begins: ~8:30 a.m. (EST)
- Ends: Midnight (EST)
- Frequency: Annual
- Locations: Palmer Street, Athens, Ohio United States
- Coordinates: 39°19′51″N 82°05′44″W
- Years active: 35
- Inaugurated: April 20, 1991
- Most recent: April 18, 2026
- Participants: Ohio University students

Palmer Fest is an annual block party in Athens, Ohio, usually taking place annually in April on Palmer Street near the city's eastern edge. Palmer Street is a major student neighborhood of Ohio University. The event regularly attracts regional attention and sparks controversy as thousands of students from universities around the state gather on the street, and reportedly engage in binge drinking and other disruptive behavior.

The origins of Palmer Fest can be traced to 1988, where the residents of 5, 6, 7 and 8 Palmer Street bought kegs and had a massive block party, culminating with a performance of an America cover band in the backyard of 7 Palmer Street. The tradition was continued and was named Palmer Fest in 1991. It was started by Lorain natives Cris Loy, Layne Songer and Mike Cioffi. The street fest's original iteration included 500 friends and neighbors of the street residents. During the first Palmer Fest, residents pooled their money together to rent a beer trailer. In 1992, individual residents hosted their own house parties with a concentration of people gathering in the backyards of 19, 21, 23 and 25 Palmer Street. After 25 years of annual parties, the attendance of the fest has grown to around 8,000 people. Substantial police presence is required each year, and the event attracted attention throughout the state as the 2009 and 2010 iterations of the party had to be shut down by riot police after "near riots" erupted with intoxicated attendees setting fires to furniture in the streets and throwing debris at police officers and fire department crews attempting to control the crowds. Subsequent backlash saw the city crack down on party ordinances, though Palmer Fest has spawned spinoff parties in town and around the state.

== Palmer Fest ==
The event is held on Palmer Street near the central east section of the city, a street 575 feet (175 m) long composed primarily of student-rented houses from undergraduates at Ohio University; it is surrounded on three sides by streets which also consist primarily of student-rented houses, as well as the student-leased Palmer Place apartment complex to the northwest. Palmer Fest is one of the largest events in the town each spring, and publicity of the event rivals the larger Halloween celebration held in the town each October, which is a city-sanctioned event. The Palmer Fest party, however, is held entirely by residents of Palmer Street and surrounding areas, who are almost exclusively students, who often erect temporary fencing around their houses and admit friends and classmates. The string of house parties, which take place throughout the day, often involve beer pong and other drinking activities. Annually revelers build stages around the houses on the street where local bands play music throughout the day. Street vendors often set up businesses at the ends of the street, and food carts report substantially improved business the weekend of Palmer Fest.

Athens and Ohio University police maintain a large presence at the party, often mounted police patrol the street and area to prevent the event from spiraling out of control. The event often produces large amounts of trash, and police are on hand the next day to supervise cleanup and ensure the houses do not violate city trash ordinances. Consequently, cleanup of the event often falls upon the residents of the respective houses.

== History ==
=== Origins ===
In the late 1980s, residents of Palmer Street began hosting a string of parties after the university removed alcohol from its annual Spring Fest and Green weekends because of changes in state liquor laws and drinking age. Spring Fest, which had been held on university grounds and featured alcohol vendors, was made alcohol-free in 1988, and attendance dropped sharply, prompting residents of Palmer Street to hold a fest of their own to replace it. While not officially advertised as Palmer Fest, the original party was organized and put on by the residents of 5 and 7 Palmer Street and held in an adjoining lot behind the properties. The term "Palmer Fest" was coined by one of the bands playing that night (18th Emergency). The original party started with 16 kegs of beer (depleted by 9:30 p.m.), a glow stick vendor, a T-Shirt vendor, a band, and it grew out of control with an open BYOB policy and a drive-thru in close proximity. The police were caught off-guard by the large number of people that attended and for that reason told organizers to contain attendees and shut it down at 11:00 p.m. or risk arrest. The next attempt in 1990 saw a lesser event due to police intervention early. Palmerfest was revived officially on April 12, 1991. The event was attended by about 500 friends of the street residents and with only 15 beer kegs. Palmerfest grew in size with each successive year as word of the party spread. In general, each Palmerfest event was described as "peaceful" with minimal police intervention. Ohio University officials have coordinated with the residents of the street to ensure the event was as safe as possible.

Historically, heavy police presence was only necessitated to break up fights or if there is property damage or disorderly behavior. Police traditionally did not need a major presence on the street. However, Ohio University, in an effort to tone down the school's party school image, cracked down on punishment for drinking. University officials noted in the years leading up to the 2009 fest, the university was seeing a measure of success in regulating student behavior and restraining drinking.

The 2008 Palmer Fest party was mostly quiet, though a lawsuit was filed by an attendee who claimed he was struck and injured by a water balloon thrown by a student resident of the street.

1999 - 2000

Palmerfest was organized by "The Barn" at 15 Palmer street. Mickey Mentzer, a resident at the house involved O.A.R. to headline both years.

=== 2009 "near riot" ===
By the May 9, 2009 Palmer Fest, attendance had grown to an estimated 8,000 people, including a significant number of students from other universities around the state. The 2009 Palmer Fest attracted statewide attention after a "near riot" erupted on Palmer Street around 10 p.m. when partygoers began setting fires to furniture in the street and assaulting police officers and firefighters who attempted to put out the blaze.

Around 10:00 p.m., officers responded to the first reports of a furniture fire in the street, and riot police moved down the street escorting a fire engine. Firefighters put out the blaze, but attendees quickly became belligerent and the crowd began shouting insults at the police, who withdrew. By 10:30, several more furniture fires were started in the street, and when police and firefighters attempted to return and extinguish the blazes, the crowd turned violent, throwing bottles of beer at police. Five police horses were injured, most by thrown glass bottles, and police reported a substantial amount of debris being thrown at them. Attendees of the party were packing the rooftops and alleys in between houses, some of whom participating in throwing debris and chanting slogans with the crowds surrounding the fires. Police responded by calling in reinforcements and 40 riot police and mounted police armed with batons and pepper spray confronted revelers and pushed them from the street and surrounding yards. Attendees criticized the behavior of the police as overly violent.

The town responded with several new safety ordinances guiding party behavior for students, including an attempted ordinance banning house concerts, as local code enforcement saw them as unsafe and potentially hazardous for fires. OU Dean of Students Dean Lombardi released a statement condemning the behavior, and police used online photos and YouTube to try and identify people responsible for the riotous behavior, and OU also announced efforts to hold students involved responsible.

=== 2010 and town backlash ===
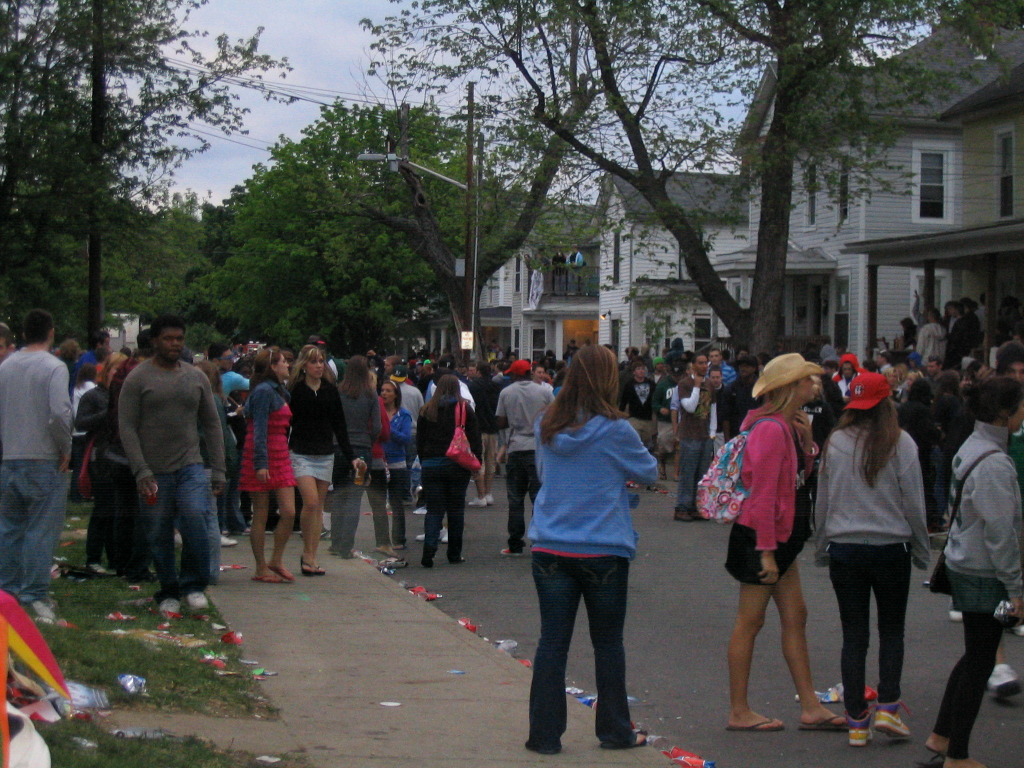
The 2010 Palmer Fest, which saw attendance of 8,000 despite unseasonably cold weather.

The May 8, 2010 Palmer Fest began around 8:00 a.m. and remained relatively calm throughout the day, spurred mainly by unseasonably cooler weather. Crowds did not block traffic or behave riotously throughout the early day, though police noted at 6:00 p.m. the tone of the crowd began to shift. At 9:20 p.m. police shut down two parties on the street due to lighting of fireworks, provoking significant antagonism from the crowd. The crowd quickly began to grow more hostile, and after 11 p.m. attendees began throwing objects at the officers. Mounted police began sweeping the sidewalks and several yards, following people who had assaulted them with objects. One officer fell off his horse while attempting to control the crowd. By 11:35 p.m. 50 riot police appeared on the street and began clearing it, armed with batons and pepper spray. One officer and one police horse were injured.

A total of 82 people were arrested during the weekend, 31 by Athens Police and 51 by state liquor control agents. Most of the arrests involved alcohol, though several arrests for rioting and felonious assault on an officer were also reported. Police subsequently created a website to identify people responsible for starting fires, taking pictures of the event from Facebook pages of people who attended the event. OU President Roderick McDavis subsequently released a written statement expressing outrage at the event, promising to hold any involved students responsible and meeting with city officials to plan preventive measures to prevent future events from spinning out of control in a similar manner.

=== 2011 ===
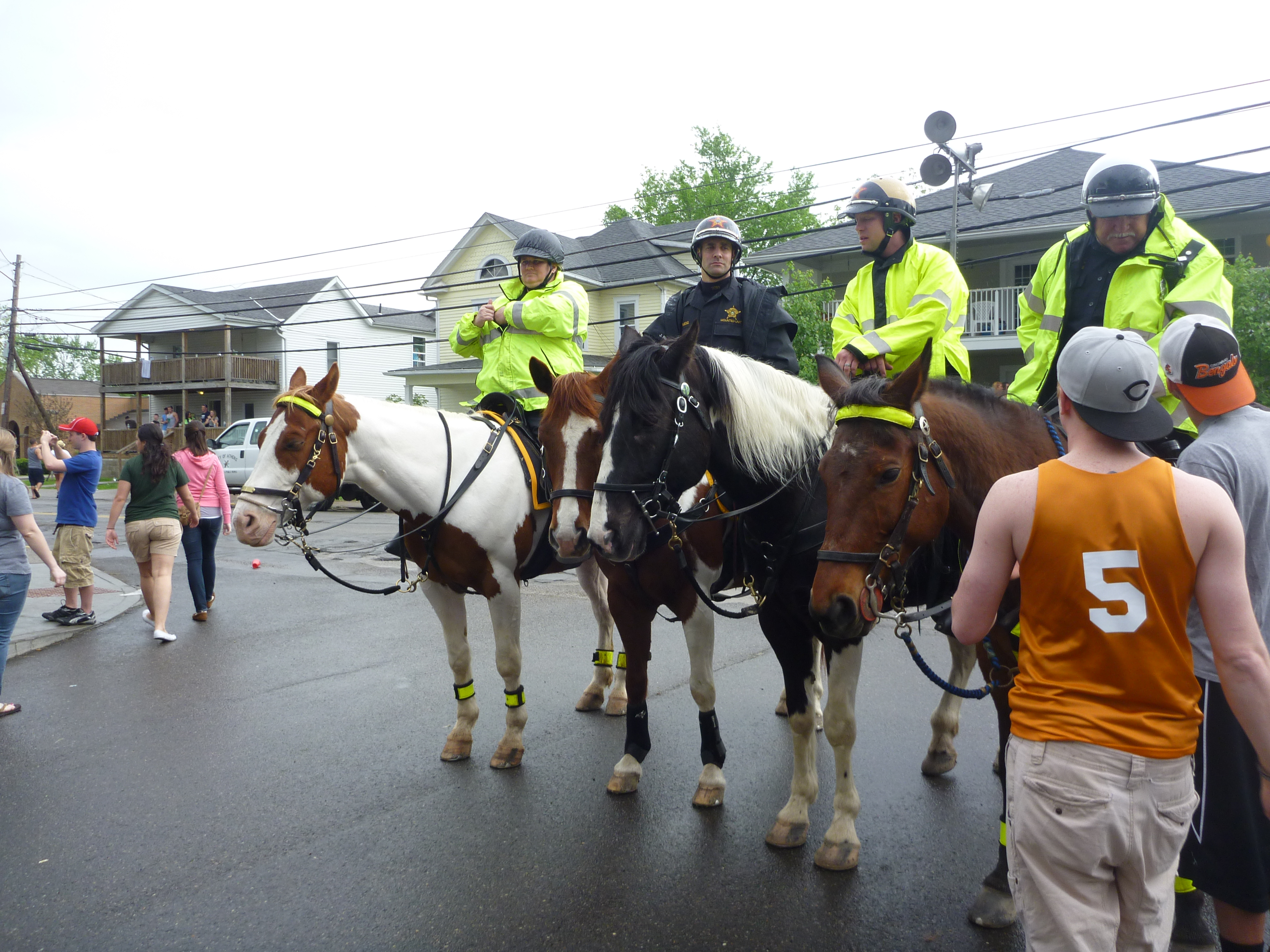
Mounted police watch the 2011 Palmerfest from the south end of the street

The May 7, 2011 Palmer Fest was called "uneventful" by police, and in spite of statewide attention the event remained calm, spurred greatly by rains throughout the day. Fires and other rioting behavior were not reported. Police reported attendees were substantially less rowdy than in previous years, never blocking the street to traffic, and crowds never escalated to violent action, as they had in the two years past. Police also attributed increased officer presence at the event and the more aggressive communication campaign to success at keeping the party in order.

However, police arrested about 170 people in connection with the event, many for underage drinking. The Ohio Department of Public Safety's investigative unit reported 172 arrests in Athens between May 6 and May 8, accounting for 86 percent of its arrests statewide. Most were for underage drinking or possession of fake IDs.

=== 2012 ===
Palmer Fest moved back into April, turned 21, and had a house set on fire. A riot zone was declared by the mayor of Athens around 7:50 p.m. and the spring fest was shut down shortly after.

=== 2024 ===
A city official said the 2024 event was the smallest in 20 years; a party-goer was injured and taken to a hospital after falling from a roof.

== Legacy ==
The growing popularity of Palmer Fest spawned similar events on other streets throughout the town. Other events, all of them coordinated house parties by houses along the same street, have subsequently sprung up on Oak Street (Oak fest) Mill Street (Mill fest) and High Street (High fest), among others.

Increased attention to the Athens area during the fests means the town continually leads the state for annual arrests by the Ohio Investigative Unit.
