= Vessels (Starset album) =

2017 studio album by Starset

Studio album by Starset
- Released: January 20, 2017; September 28, 2018 (Vessels 2.0)
- Studios: Black Birch Studios (Kennebunk, Maine); NRG Recording Studios (North Hollywood, Los Angeles)
- Genres: Hard rock; progressive rock; electronic rock
- Length: 70:21 (Vessels); 109:07 (Vessels 2.0)
- Labels: Razor & Tie; Fearless (Vessels 2.0)
- Producer: Rob Graves

Starset chronology
Transmissions (2014)	Vessels (2017)	Divisions (2019)

Singles from Vessels
- 1. "Monster" Released: October 28, 2016; 2. "Satellite" Released: January 20, 2017

Deluxe edition cover
- Vessels 2.0 artwork

Singles from Vessels 2.0
- 1. "Die for You (Acoustic Version)" Released: August 23, 2018; 2. "Starlight (Acoustic Version)" Released: August 31, 2018; 3. "Satellite (Acoustic Version)" Released: September 14, 2018

Vessels (stylized as ▽ESSELS) is the second studio album by American rock band Starset, released on January 20, 2017 through Razor & Tie.

The album peaked at number 11 on the Billboard 200. The first single from the album, "Monster", peaked at number 2 on the Billboard Mainstream Rock Songs chart in May 2017, becoming the band's highest-charting song to date. The second single, "Satellite", peaked at number 12 on the same chart in November 2017. A deluxe edition of the album titled Vessels 2.0 was released on September 28, 2018.

== Writing and recording ==
Frontman Dustin Bates outlines the process for creating the album:

I start with sonic goals. This time I had a greater understanding of what instrumentation and even arrangements and genres, to an extent, would be amalgamated into these songs… and then chord structures. Once there’s a great chord structure then I always scat melodies. Then once I have the melody I spend an exorbitant amount of time coming up with lyrics that fit the theme that I want, over that melody. I think it is the way I’ve always written, then after that a readdressing of the musical soundscape and flushing out of the atmosphere of it as well.

Work on the album started as early as June 2015. Bates estimates that it took collectively 9 months to create the album, with small interspersed breaks for touring in support of the band's prior album, Transmissions.

== Composition and sound ==
Bates described the album's sound in comparison to their prior album, Transmissions:

Trying to push the sonic boundaries or even the boundaries that were set by Transmissions. Whereas it was centred in the hard rock lane before, now it goes more metal at times, and the guitar work borrows from djent stylings, and it gets more ambient at times, using electronics at a more deeply integrated level. Whereas the strings were more cinematic, there was more of a quartet before, on this record it’s more of an orchestration I would say. Hopefully increasing in breadth and depth and making it more difficult to tie it to a specific genre.

Vessels has been described as hard rock, electronic rock, and progressive rock, by professional critics. Bates also stated he implemented some elements of EDM into the music.

== Reception ==
Professional ratings
Review scores
Source	Rating
Metal Hammer	3/7
Rock Hard	7.5/10
Rock Sound	7/10

The album was strongly praised by Loudwire, stating that "Vessels works on multiple levels. If you're looking for engaging singular tracks to fill your playlist, this album has several songs that could keep the band on radio for a long run. But if you're looking for a deeper connection and a full listening experience, Vessels truly takes the listener on a journey both musically and thematically, utilising synths, drums, guitars and Bates' at times dreamlike, at other times aggressive vocal approach." The lead single from the album "Monster" also received particular praise for its blend of hard rock with electronic elements, and was featured in many decade end rock songs lists.

== Track listing ==
All tracks are written by Dustin Bates (except "Love You to Death"), with additional writers where noted.

No.	Title	Writer(s)	Length
1.	"The Order"		1:06
2.	"Satellite"	Joe Rickard; Stacy Hogan	3:59
3.	"Frequency"	Paul Trust; Rob Graves	4:41
4.	"Die for You (Note: Stylized in all caps, however the acoustic version is not.)"	Daniel Ticotin	5:17
5.	"Ricochet"	Rickard	5:10
6.	"Starlight"	Ticotin; Hogan	4:46
7.	"Into the Unknown"	Mitch Marlow	4:30
8.	"Gravity of You"	Josh Baker; Graves	4:46
9.	"Back to the Earth"	Rickard	4:13
10.	"Last to Fall"	Ticotin; Graves	5:03
11.	"Bringing It Down"	Trust; Graves	5:48
12.	"Unbecoming"	Baker	4:10
13.	"Monster"	Johnny Andrews; Graves	4:16
14.	"Telepathic"	Ticotin; Jeff Halavacs; Graves	4:42
15.	"Everglow"	Rickard; Graves	7:54
Total length:			70:21

Vessels 2.0 – Deluxe edition
No.	Title	Writer(s)	Length
16.	"Bringing It Down" (Version 2.0)	Trust; Graves	4:58
17.	"Die for You" (acoustic)	Ticotin	4:30
18.	"Telepathic" (acoustic)	Ticotin; Halavacs; Graves	3:51
19.	"Starlight" (acoustic)	Ticotin; Hogan	4:47
20.	"Ricochet" (acoustic)	Rickard	4:52
21.	"Satellite" (acoustic)	Rickard; Hogan	3:50
22.	"Love You to Death" (Type O Negative cover)	Peter Steele	5:32
23.	"Telepathic" (Not Your Dope remix)	Ticotin; Halavacs; Graves	3:37
24.	"Satellite" (TRAILS remix)	Rickard; Hogan	2:49
Total length:			109:07

== Personnel ==
=== Musicians ===
- Dustin Bates – vocals, guitars, additional programming
- Rob Graves – programming, guitars, bass
- Alex Niceforo – programming
- Igor Khoroshev – programming, strings and orchestra arrangements
- Josh Baker – additional programming
- Paul Trust – additional programming
- Ron DeChant – additional backing vocals
- Joe Rickard – drums
- David Davidson – violin
- David Angell – violin
- Elizabeth Lamb – viola
- Anthony Lamarchina – cello

=== Technical ===
- Rob Graves – production, engineering
- Ben Grosse – mixing
- Bob Ludwig – mastering
- Mike Plotnikoff – engineering
- Justin Spotswood – engineering
- Paul Decarli – digital editing
- Joe Rickard – digital editing, additional pre-production
- Josh Baker – additional pre-production
- Sahaj Ticotin – additional pre-production
- Paul Trust – additional pre-production

== Charts ==
=== Weekly charts ===
Weekly chart performance for Vessels
Chart (2017)	Peak position
Australian Albums (ARIA)	52
Austrian Albums (Ö3 Austria)	56
Canadian Albums (Billboard)	60
German Albums (Offizielle Top 100)	85
UK Digital Albums (OCC)	53
UK Rock & Metal Albums (OCC)	13
US Billboard 200	11
US Top Alternative Albums (Billboard)	2
US Top Rock Albums (Billboard)	3
US Top Hard Rock Albums (Billboard)	2

=== Year-end charts ===
Year-end chart performance for Vessels
Chart (2017)	Position
US Top Hard Rock Albums (Billboard)	50
