= Halo (Starset song) =

Single by Starset

from the album Transmissions
- Released: May 4, 2015
- Recorded: 2013
- Genre: Hard rock
- Length: 3:45
- Label: Razor & Tie
- Songwriter: Dustin Bates
- Producer: Rob Graves

Starset singles chronology
| "Carnivore" (2014) | "Halo" (2015) | "Monster" (2016) |

Music video
- "Halo" on YouTube

"Halo" is a single by American rock band Starset, off of their studio album Transmissions. It peaked at number 16 on the US Billboard Mainstream Rock Songs chart in 2015.

== Background ==
"Halo" was released as the third single from Starset's first album Transmissions. The song's music video was debuted on the Nerdist website in May 2017. The song entered the US Billboard Mainstream Rock Songs chart in May 2015, and peaked at number 16 later that October.

== Themes and composition ==
Frontman Dustin Bates states that the song's lyrics were inspired by the life of the fictional Thomas Bell, a character whose message is the foundation of the Transmissions concept album. He described it as a love song, written from the perspective of a male hero who feels empowered by his female love interest and his love for her. He later expanded on the idea and compared it to the story of Batman, with the song being representative of a symbiotic relationship between a hero and who he protects. The song's music video also played into the same concept, featuring scientists in a dystopian future working against unseen but ominous forces, and a male scientist working towards finding a female scientist in the process.

Musically, journalists described the song's sound as being similar to the work of Linkin Park, 30 Seconds to Mars, and Muse.

== Reception ==
Journalists generally praised the song and music video for containing relatively heavy and thought-provoking material for a single. Matt Grossinger, staff music editor at The Nerdist, felt that Bates' real-life background of getting his PhD in electrical engineering gave more meaning to the song's message, stating "After taking a single glimpse at the dystopian music video for Starset’s song 'Halo', it feels weightier to consider the technophobic vision of our inevitable doom through the lens of someone who has credentialed expertise. With each successive video the band has rolled out, we have seen a wider scope of the doomed world Bates envisions, but 'Halo' actually provides a bit of hope. Though humanity is facing extinction, our protagonist is willing to risk his own life to save his boo, and that is a life-affirming archetype that will never go away no matter how f–ked we are after the singularity/nuclear holocaust."

== Personnel ==
- Dustin Bates – lead vocals, keyboard
- Brock Richards – lead guitar
- Ron DeChant – bass
- Adam Gilbert – drums

== Charts ==
| Chart (2015) | Peak position |
|---|---|
| US Mainstream Rock Airplay (Billboard) | 16 |
| US Rock & Alternative Airplay (Billboard) | 41 |
