= Satellite (Starset song) =

Single by Starset

from the album Vessels
- Released: August 12, 2017
- Recorded: 2016
- Genre: Synthrock
- Length: 3:59
- Label: Razor & Tie
- Songwriter: Dustin Bates
- Producer: Rob Graves

Starset singles chronology
"Monster" (2016)	"Satellite" (2017)	"Ricochet" (2018)

Music video
- "Satellite" on YouTube

"Satellite" is the second single from American rock band Starset's second album, Vessels, after first single "Monster". "Satellite" was released as a single in August 2017, and peaked at number 12 on the Billboard Mainstream Rock Songs chart.

== Background ==
The song is the second track, and second single from Starset's second album Vessels. The song was debuted three days prior to the album's January 20, 2017, release date, through Marvel's website in a story detailing the future collaboration of the company with the band to create a supplementary graphic novel about the album. The song was released as a single in August 2017, and has peaked at number 12 on the Billboard Mainstream Rock Songs chart as of November 2017. The band performed the song live in October 2017 at the Loudwire Music Awards. An acoustic version of the song was released as a single for the deluxe album, Vessels 2.0.

== Themes and composition ==
The song's sound has been compared to the work of the bands Attack Attack! and 30 Seconds to Mars due to its "processed vocals and huge synth hooks". The song has dense, layered singing, combining heavy guitar, keyboard, synthesizers, and violins. Loudwire noted that the track would make a good single due to its "synth-driven, infinitely listenable melodic lamentations on the desire for connection, with Bates begging, 'Satellite are you here tonight? / Shine your light and set me free'". Multiple reviewers noted it as a standout track of the album.

== Personnel ==
- Dustin Bates – lead vocals, guitars
- Brock Richards – lead guitar
- Ron DeChant – bass
- Adam Gilbert – drums

== Charts ==
Chart (2017)	Peak position
US Mainstream Rock Airplay (Billboard)	12
US Rock & Alternative Airplay (Billboard)	40
