= Carnivore (song) =

Single by Starset

from the album Transmissions
- Released: October 29, 2014
- Recorded: 2013
- Genre: Hard rock
- Length: 4:22
- Label: Razor & Tie
- Songwriter: Dustin Bates
- Producer: Rob Graves

Starset singles chronology
| "My Demons" (2013) | "Carnivore" (2014) | "Halo" (2015) |

Music video
- "Carnivore" on YouTube

"Carnivore" is a single by American rock band Starset, off of their studio album Transmissions. It peaked at number 16 on the US Billboard Mainstream Rock Songs chart in 2014.

== Background ==
A music video was released for the song on October 29, 2014. The band's official video was directed by Ramon Boutviseth. The band also had several other videos in relation to the song, including a fan contest to create the best music video on YouTube, and working closely with James Spratt of professional esports team Faze Clan to create videos, because the band's music had become popular among the video gamer community for making game-play montages to the band's music. The song's music video topped Loudwire's top 10 music video chart twice in 2015, including narrowly beating Slipknot's video for "The Devil in I".

== Themes and composition ==
Frontman Dustin Bates described the song's lyrical themes as being about "standing up to oppressive forces", along the same lines as the movie V for Vendetta.

== Reception ==
Commercially, the song peaked at number 16 on the Billboard US Mainstream Rock Songs chart in 2015. Additionally, outlets such as The Huffington Post noted that the song was particularly well received in the music streaming world, similar to prior single "My Demons", racking up "tens of millions of views" on sites such as YouTube. Collectively with the album's other releases, the band earned $232,000 from streaming on the site alone.

== Personnel ==
- Dustin Bates – lead vocals, keyboard
- Brock Richards – lead guitar
- Ron DeChant – bass
- Adam Gilbert – drums

== Charts ==
| Chart (2015) | Peak position |
|---|---|
| US Mainstream Rock Airplay (Billboard) | 16 |
