= Starset =

American rock band

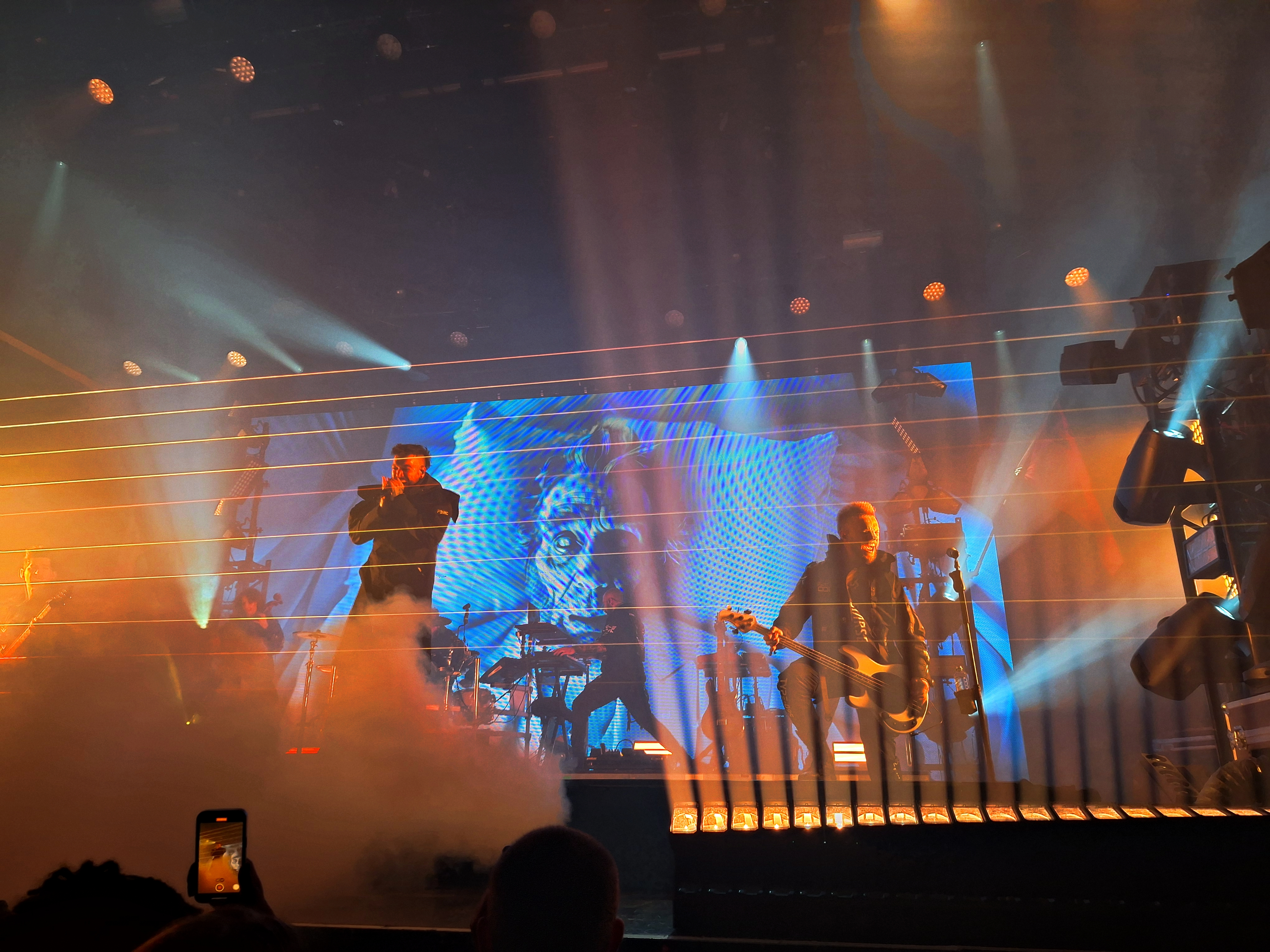
- Starset performing in 2024

Background information
- Origin: Columbus, Ohio, U.S.
- Genres: Alternative rock; electronic rock; hard rock; alternative metal; progressive rock
- Works: Starset discography
- Years active: 2013–present
- Labels: Razor & Tie; Fearless
- Spinoff of: Downplay
- Members: Dustin Bates; Ron DeChant; Brock Richards; Adam Gilbert; Siobhán Richards; Zuzana Engererova; Cory Juba
- Website: starsetonline.com

Starset is an American rock band from Columbus, Ohio, formed by Dustin Bates in 2013. They released their debut album, Transmissions, in 2014 and their second album, Vessels, on January 20, 2017. The band has found success in expanding the ideas of their concept albums through social media and YouTube, with the band generating over $230,000 in revenue from views from the latter as of November 2016. Their single "My Demons" had accumulated over 280 million YouTube views in the same time period. Their most commercially successful song, "Monster", peaked at number 2 on the US Billboard Mainstream Rock chart in May 2017. A third studio album, Divisions, was released on September 13, 2019, with their fourth studio album, Horizons, released on October 22, 2021. Their fifth album, Silos, was released September 12, 2025.

== History ==
=== Formation and Transmissions (2013–2015) ===
Starset was formed in 2013 by Downplay vocalist Dustin Bates, who is the band's lead singer, songwriter, and keyboardist. Bates's interest in astronomy was first fueled when acquiring his master's in electrical engineering as he studied at Ohio University. He completed research for the US Air Force and also taught at the International Space University. Bates created the fictional backstory for the band that forms the thematic basis for their music and multimedia. In the backstory, Starset was formed as part of a public outreach initiative by the Starset Society, whose aims were to alert the public about the contents of "the Message" the society obtained from a mysterious signal from space. Starset treats their backstory and the Starset Society as real in interviews, with few exceptions.

The band released their debut album, Transmissions, on July 8, 2014. The release debuted at number 49 on the US Billboard 200 charts, making it one of the highest debut albums for a rock band in 2014, and as of 2016, had sold over 79,000 copies. Three singles were released in promotion of the album: "My Demons", "Carnivore", and "Halo". They also performed well in the charts, reaching fifth, sixteenth, and sixteenth, respectively, on the Billboard US Mainstream Rock charts. The band later released an accompanying novel, The Prox Transmissions, further detailing Bates's fictional back-history of the Starset Society story.

=== Vessels (2016–2018) ===
Rob Graves, who produced Transmissions, announced on January 26, 2016, that the making of Starset's second record has "officially commenced". Along with the announcement of European tour dates supporting Breaking Benjamin, Starset announced their second album, which Bates said would be more stylistically diverse than the previous, ranging in genre from metal to pop. On October 4, 2016, Starset posted to their social media an image from a graphic novel produced by Marvel Comics as a tie-in to The Prox Transmissions. The 88-page graphic novel was co-written by Dustin Bates and Peter David, illustrated by Mirko Colak, and released in September 2017.

The album's first single, "Monster" was released on October 28, 2016. On November 4, 2016, Starset announced their upcoming album Vessels, which was released on January 20, 2017. The album debuted at number 11 on the Billboard 200 albums chart. The band spent much of 2017 touring in support of the album. The band toured with Black Satellite in the first half of 2017. In July 2017, the band performed at Seether frontman Shaun Morgan's "Rise Above Fest", alongside Shinedown and Halestorm. A second single from the album, "Satellite", was released in August 2017, peaking at number 12 on the Billboard Mainstream Rock Chart.

The band would continue touring through the first half of 2018, though Bates said he would likely take a break before pursuing a third album with the band. Instead, he was planning on releasing music under a different project name, MNQN, which would be far more electronic-based. Bates stated that he also had been working on some progressive rock–styled music that he intended to release as well, though he did not disclose when, or if, it would be released under the Starset name. In April 2018, the band announced that they had signed to Fearless Records and released a music video for the Vessels track "Ricochet". An alternate acoustic recording of the song was also released shortly after.

In August 2018, the band released a second version of the Vessels track "Bringing it Down" and announced a deluxe edition of the album, titled Vessels 2.0. Nine new tracks appeared on Vessels 2.0, consisting of "reimagined", acoustic, and remixed versions of songs from the original Vessels along with a cover of "Love You to Death" by Type O Negative. The album was released on September 28, 2018. The press release for Vessels 2.0 also stated that the band had plans to release their third studio album in 2019. MNQN's self-titled debut album released on April 4, 2019, and a live date at the Wonderbus Music and Arts Festival in Columbus, Ohio, on August 18, 2019, was announced. Much like Starset, the MNQN project features a fictional backstory, based on the titular artificial intelligence created by the Sentience Corp.

=== Divisions (2019–2020) ===
On May 13, 2019, Starset announced that the third album would be released on September 13, 2019, along with fall tour dates for the United States. Spring 2020 tour dates for Europe and the UK were announced on July 2, 2019. The album's name, Divisions, was announced in August 2019 alongside the release of its first single, "Manifest". On September 5, 2019 guitarist Brock Richards and violinist Siobhán Richards (née Cronin) were married. The album was released on September 13, 2019. By 2020, the band had received two billion streams worldwide. Due to the COVID-19 pandemic in 2020, most of Starset's tours were first postponed and later cancelled. However, Starset released the reimagined version of the single "TRIALS" and the remix version of "WAKING UP" in August 2020 and December 2020

=== Horizons (2021–2023) ===
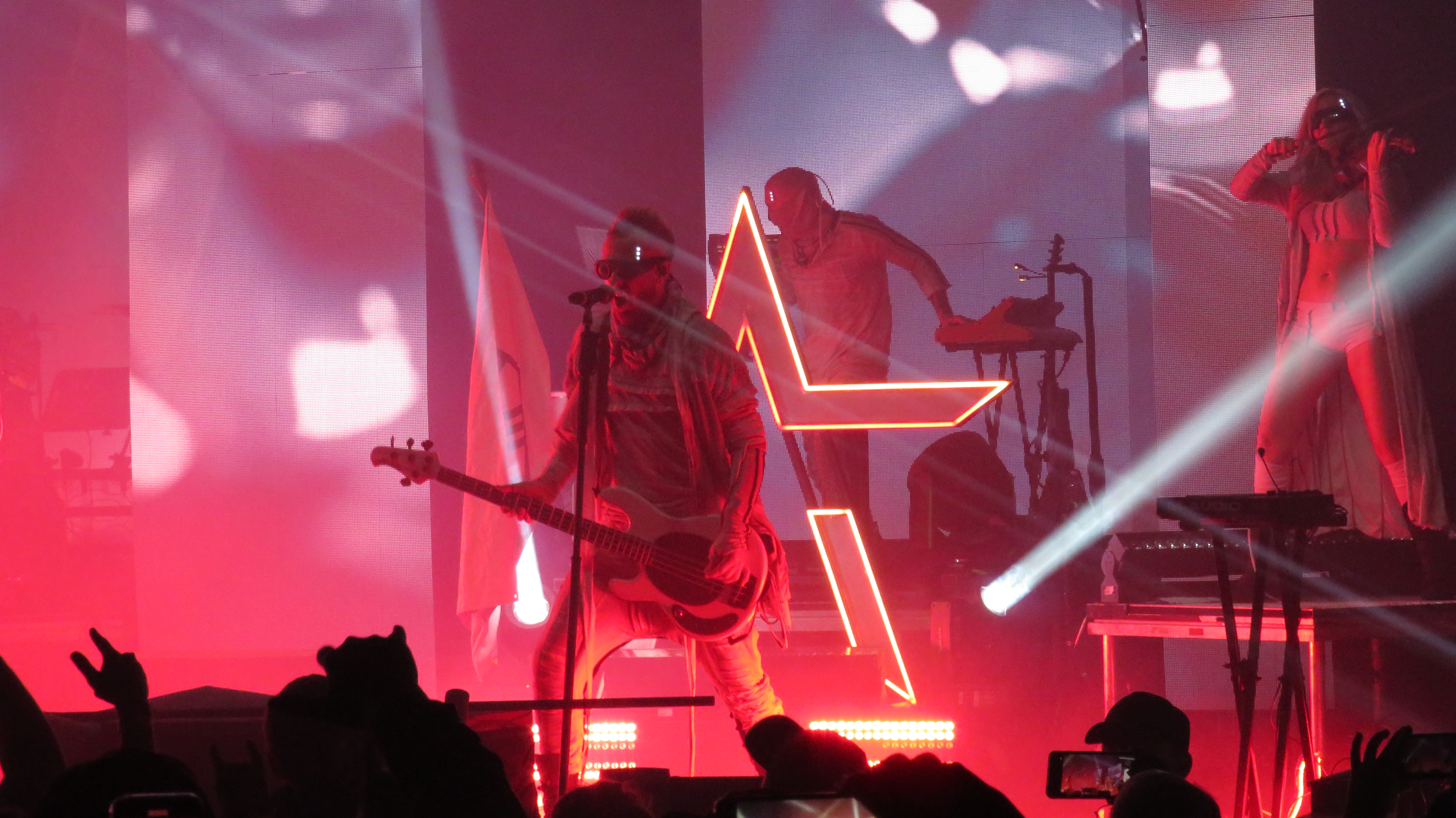
Starset performing in 2021

In April 2021, Starset released a cover of Led Zeppelin's "Kashmir" exclusively for Amazon Music and a new song, "Infected", to celebrate the second anniversary of the video game Arknights. In May 2021, the band made their first demonstration announcement since the pandemic, saying that they would give a performance on LouderThanLife (September 2021) and Rockville (November 2021).

In June, Starset announced that they would hold a series of "AE01 Acoustic Event" during the next two months across America, in which the band would give totally acoustic performances and interact intimately with the audience. The upcoming tour of the United States and Europe, which started in November 2021 and February 2022 respectively, were subsequently announced. On September 10, 2021, the band announced that their fourth studio album, Horizons, was scheduled for release on October 22, 2021. They also released a music video for a new song from the album, named "The Breach", and released the track listing for the album, revealing that the previously released song, "Infected", would also be on the album. On September 23, 2021, they released a lyric video for "Leaving This World Behind", and on October 7 of the same year, they released a lyric video for "Earthrise". On August 19, 2022, Starset released a collaboration song with Breaking Benjamin, called "Waiting on the Sky to Change", a reworking of a song from Bates's previous band, Downplay.

=== Silos (2024–2026) ===
On May 3, 2024, Starset released the first single, "Brave New World", and its accompanying music video. On July 4, 2024, the second single, "Degenerate", was released. On August 15, 2024, the third single, "TokSik", was released. On November 8, 2024, the fourth single, "Dystopia", was released with its accompanying music video. On February 28, 2025, the fifth single, "Dark Things", was released with its accompanying music video. On May 2, 2025, a cover for "Head Over Heels" by Tears For Fears, was released with its accompanying music video. On June 27, 2025, the seventh single, "Silos" was released. On August 29th, the eighth single, a cover of "Shattered Dreams" by Johnny Hates Jazz, was released alongside the official album announcement, titled Silos, which released on September 12.

=== Revelations (2026-Present) ===
On August 21, 2026, Starset released the single "Paradoxic" (stylized as p a r a d 0 x 1 c).

On September 11th, 2026, Starset also released the single "Annihilation" (stylized as a n n 1 h 1 l a t 1 0 n).

On October 2nd, Starset released a third single, titled "Transfusion" (stylized as t r a n s f u s 1 0 n).

On November 13th, Starset released a fourth single, titled "Voyager" (stylized as "v 0 y a g e r").

On November 20th, Starset had announced their sixth record "Revelations" (stylized as "r e v e l a t 1 0 n s"). The album is set to release December 4th.

== Musical style and influences ==
Starset's musical style has been described as alternative rock, electronic rock, hard rock, alternative metal, and progressive rock. Due to the large number of styles, instruments, and influences of the band's work, many outlets, including AllMusic, Billboard, and Revolver all commonly label the band as "rock" or as a "rock band".

Bates informally describes the music as "cinematic rock". In elaborating further, he said it's "as if a hard-rock band did the soundtrack to an epic blockbuster movie. ... We're blending symphonics with electronics with riff-driven, baritone guitar hard rock". Bates explained the evolution of sound with the band's second album, Vessels: "Whereas [Transmissions] was centered in the hard rock lane before, now it goes more metal at times, and the guitar work borrows from djent stylings, and it gets more ambient at times, using electronics at a more deeply integrated level. Whereas the strings were more cinematic, there was more of a quartet before, on this record it’s more of an orchestration."

Bates also stated he implemented some elements of EDM into the second album. Dave Richards Erie Times-News' described the band's sound as "blending the progressive aspirations of Muse with the openhearted approach of emotional and muscular power of bands like Breaking Benjamin". Bates also includes a notable amount of harsh vocals as well as both raw and pitch corrected clean vocals for many different effects.

Influences of Starset include Hans Zimmer, Nine Inch Nails, Sigur Ros, Thirty Seconds to Mars, Deftones, Linkin Park and Breaking Benjamin.

== Members ==
Current members

- Dustin Bates – lead vocals, keyboards, piano, synths, guitars, soundboard, programming (2013–present)
- Ron DeChant – bass, keyboards, backing vocals (2013–present)
- Brock Richards – guitars, backing vocals (2013–present)
- Adam Gilbert – drums, percussion (2013–present)
- Siobhán Richards – violin, keyboards (2020–present; touring 2017–2020)
- Zuzana Engererova – cello (2020–present; touring 2019-2020)
- Cory Juba – guitars, synths, soundboard, drum pads (2021–present)

Former touring musicians

- Mariko Muranaka Friend – cello, violin (2014–2015, 2018–2019)
- Nneka Lyn – cello (2016)
- Jonathan Kampfe – cello (2017–2018)

Timeline

== Discography ==
Studio albums

- Transmissions (2014)
- Vessels (2017)
- Divisions (2019)
- Horizons (2021)
- Silos (2025)
- Revelations (2026)

== See also ==
- Music of Ohio
