= Transmissions (Starset album) =

Studio album by Starset
- Released: July 8, 2014
- Genres: Hard rock; alternative rock; electronic rock; progressive rock
- Length: 60:00
- Label: Razor & Tie
- Producer: Rob Graves

Starset chronology
Transmissions (2014)	Vessels (2017)

Singles from Transmissions
- 1. "My Demons" Released: October 24, 2013; 2. "Carnivore" Released: October 29, 2014; 3. "Halo" Released: May 4, 2015

Transmissions is the debut studio album by American rock band Starset, released on July 8, 2014, through Razor & Tie. Three singles were released in support of the album; "My Demons", "Carnivore", and "Halo", all charting in the top 20 of the US Billboard Mainstream Rock chart.

== Background ==
Transmissions is a concept album. The album was produced by Rob Graves and mixed by Ben Grosse. A deluxe version of the album was released on iTunes on February 12, 2016, featuring four new acoustic recordings of songs "My Demons", "Halo", "Point of No Return", and "Let It Die" along with three previously released remixed tracks. As of November 2016, the album has sold 79,000 copies in the United States, according to Billboard. and a quarter million overall, factoring in album sales, downloads, and streaming.

The songs "Down with the Fallen" and "Dark on Me" had previously been recorded and released by Dustin Bates's previous band, Downplay.

== Track listing ==
All tracks are written by Dustin Bates, with additional writers where noted.

No.	Title	Writer(s)	Length
1.	"First Light"		1:24
2.	"Down with the Fallen"	Paul Trust	4:17
3.	"Halo"		3:45
4.	"Carnivore"		4:22
5.	"Telescope"		5:31
6.	"It Has Begun"		5:16
7.	"My Demons"	Stephen Aiello	4:48
8.	"Antigravity"		6:09
9.	"Dark on Me"	Trust	5:38
10.	"Let It Die"		4:32
11.	"The Future Is Now"		4:45
12.	"Point of No Return"	Rob Hawkins; Rob Graves; Alan Powell	3:39
13.	"Rise and Fall"		5:54
Total length:			60:00

Deluxe edition
No.	Title	Writer(s)	Length
14.	"My Demons" (acoustic)	Aeillo	3:34
15.	"Halo" (acoustic)		3:36
16.	"Point of No Return" (acoustic)	Hawkins; Graves; Powell	3:56
17.	"Let It Die" (acoustic)		3:15
18.	"My Demons" (Synchronice Remix)	Aeillo	3:53
19.	"Let It Die" (Maniac Agenda Remix)		7:32
20.	"Telescope" (EmoTek Remix)		7:00
Total length:			92:46

== Personnel ==
Musicians

- Dustin Bates – vocals, guitars, bass
- Rob Graves – programming, guitars, strings arrangements
- Josh Baker – programming, guitars
- Chris Flury – programming
- Rob Hawkins – programming
- Alex Niceford – programming
- Joe Rickard – programming, drums
- Miles McPherson – additional drums (9)
- John Catchings – cello
- Monisa Angell – viola
- David Angell – violin
- David Davidson – violin, strings arrangements,

Production

- Mike Gitter – A&R
- Rob Graves – producer, engineer
- Ben Schmitt – engineer
- Eric Emery – engineer (14–17)
- Brian Virtue – drum engineer
- Baheo "Bobby" Shin – string engineer
- Ben Grosse – mixing
- Paul Pavao – mixing
- Maor Appelbaum – mastering
- Lance Buckley – package design
- Matt Tisdale – illustration
- Stephen Hutton – management
- Logan Mader – management

== Charts ==
Chart (2014)	Peak position
US Billboard 200	49
US Top Rock Albums	16
US Top Hard Rock Albums	5
US Top Alternative Albums	12
US Top Digital Albums	24

=== Singles ===
Title	Year	Peak chart positions	
Title	Year	Mainstream Rock	Rock
"My Demons"	2013	5	36
"Carnivore"	2014	16	—
"Halo"	2015	16	41
